= List of animated feature films released theatrically in the United States (2000–2019) =

This list of theatrical animated feature films consists of animated films released theatrically, whether wide or limited, in the United States, between 2000 and 2019.

Made-for-TV and direct-to-video films will not be featured on this list, unless they have had a theatrical release in some form.

Primarily live-action films with heavy use of special effects are also included.

== Films ==
=== Released ===
Title	Release date	Accompanying short	Medium	Studio	Distributor	Running time (minutes)	Budget	Box office	Note
The Tigger Movie	February 6, 2000 (El Capitan Theatre); February 11, 2000 (official release)	Disney Mambo No. 5	Traditional animation	Walt Disney Pictures; Disney MovieToons; Walt Disney Television Animation	Buena Vista Pictures Distribution	78	$20–30 million	$96,159,800	A sequel to The Many Adventures of Winnie the Pooh, the third animated film from Disney MovieToons and the fourth animated film from Walt Disney Television Animation.
Sinbad: Beyond the Veil of Mists	January 28, 2000 (limited release); February 18, 2000 (official release)	—N/a	Computer animation	Improvision; Pentamedia Graphics	Phaedra Cinema	82	—N/a	$29,245	The first animated film from Phaedra Cinema and the first computer-animated film to be created exclusively using motion-capture.
Kirikou and the Sorceress	February 18, 2000	—N/a	Traditional animation	France 3 Cinema; Les Armateurs; Monipoly Productions; Odec Kid Cartoons; Rija Studio; Studio O Trans Europe Film	Armattan Productions	71	$3,800,000	$281,179	The first animated film from Armattan Productions. Also spawned two sequels, Kirikou and the Wild Beasts and Kirikou and the Men and Women.
X	March 10, 2000	—N/a	Anime	Madhouse	Manga Entertainment	100	—N/a	$143,355	The second animated film from Manga Entertainment.
The Road to El Dorado	March 29, 2000 (Westwood Village Theatre); March 31, 2000 (official release)	—N/a	Traditional animation	DreamWorks Animation	DreamWorks Pictures	89	$95 million	$76,432,727	The third animated film from DreamWorks Pictures and the third animated film from DreamWorks Animation.
Dinosaur	May 13, 2000 (El Capitan Theatre); May 19, 2000 (official release)	—N/a	Computer animation/Live-action	Walt Disney Pictures; Walt Disney Feature Animation; The Secret Lab	Buena Vista Pictures Distribution	82	$127,500,000	$349,822,765	The 39th animated film from Walt Disney Feature Animation, Disney's first non-Pixar computer-animated film and the first animated film from The Secret Lab.
Titan A.E.	June 13, 2000 (Staples Center); June 16, 2000 (official release)	—N/a	Traditional animation	20th Century Fox Animation; Fox Animation Studios; David Kirschner Productions	20th Century Fox	95	$75,000,000	$36,754,634	The ninth animated film from 20th Century Fox, the second animated film from 20th Century Fox Animation, the second and last animated film from Fox Animation Studios before their closure in 2000 and the first major animated film to be screened in end-to-end digital cinema package (DCP).
Chicken Run	June 17, 2000 (Universal CityWalk); June 23, 2000 (official release)	—N/a	Stop motion	DreamWorks Animation; Aardman Animations	DreamWorks Pictures; Pathé	84	$45 million	$224,834,564	The fourth animated film from DreamWorks Pictures, the first animated film from Pathé, the fourth animated film from DreamWorks Animation and the first animated film from Aardman. Nominee of a Golden Globe Award for Best Motion Picture – Musical or Comedy and also spawned a 2023 sequel, Chicken Run: Dawn of the Nugget.
The Adventures of Rocky and Bullwinkle	June 24, 2000 (Universal CityWalk); June 30, 2000 (official release)	—N/a	Traditional animation/Computer animation/Live-action	TriBeCa Productions; Jay Ward Productions; Capella Films; KC Medien	Universal Pictures	92	$76,000,000	$35,134,820	The third Universal animated film with live-action.
Pokémon: The Movie 2000	July 15, 2000 (Westwood Village Theatre); July 21, 2000 (official release)	Pikachu's Rescue Adventure	Anime	4Kids Entertainment; OLM	Warner Bros. Pictures	80	$30,000,000	$133,949,270	A sequel to Pokémon: The First Movie and the 21st animated film from Warner Bros. Pictures.
Digimon: The Movie	October 6, 2000	Angela Anaconda: Good Seats	Anime	Fox Kids; Saban Entertainment; Toei Animation	20th Century Fox	84	$5,000,000	$16,643,191	The 10th animated film from 20th Century Fox and the first animated film to be based on Digimon.
Rugrats in Paris: The Movie	November 5, 2000 (Grauman's Chinese Theatre); November 17, 2000 (official release)	Edwurd Fudwupper Fibbed Big (select theatres only)	Traditional animation	Nickelodeon Movies; Klasky Csupo	Paramount Pictures	78	$30,000,000	$103,291,131	A sequel to The Rugrats Movie, the 13th animated film from Paramount Pictures and the second animated film from Nickelodeon Movies.
The Emperor's New Groove	December 10, 2000 (El Capitan Theatre); December 15, 2000 (official release)	—N/a	Traditional animation	Walt Disney Pictures; Walt Disney Feature Animation	Buena Vista Pictures Distribution	78	$100,000,000	$169,327,687	The 40th animated film from Walt Disney Feature Animation. Also spawned into a 2005 direct-to-video sequel.
Recess: School's Out	February 10, 2001 (El Capitan Theatre); February 16, 2001 (official release)	—N/a	Traditional animation	Walt Disney Pictures; Walt Disney Television Animation	Buena Vista Pictures Distribution	83	$23,000,000	$44,460,850	The fifth animated film from Walt Disney Television Animation.
Monkeybone	February 23, 2001	—N/a	Stop-motion/Live-action	1492 Pictures	20th Century Fox	93	$75,000,000	$7,622,365	The third Fox animated film with live-action.
Haunted Castle	February 23, 2001	—N/a	Computer animation	nWave Pictures		38	—N/a	$13,651,656	The second animated film from nWave Pictures.
Pokémon 3: The Movie	April 6, 2001	Pikachu & Pichu	Anime	4Kids Entertainment; OLM	Warner Bros. Pictures	73	$3,000,000	$68,452,128	A sequel to Pokémon: The First Movie and Pokémon: The Movie 2000, and the 22nd animated film from Warner Bros. Pictures.
The Trumpet of the Swan	May 11, 2001	—N/a	Traditional animation	TriStar Pictures; Nest Family Entertainment; RichCrest Animation Studios	Sony Pictures Releasing	75	—N/a	$102,202	The second animated film from TriStar Pictures and the fourth animated film from RichCrest Animation Studios.
Shrek	April 22, 2001 (Westwood Village Theatre); May 18, 2001 (official release)	—N/a	Computer animation	DreamWorks Animation; PDI/DreamWorks	DreamWorks Pictures	90	$50–60 million	$484,409,218	The fifth animated film from DreamWorks Pictures and the fifth animated film from DreamWorks Animation. Entered into the 2001 Cannes Film Festival, nominee of a Golden Globe Award for Best Motion Picture – Musical or Comedy and winner of the first-ever Academy Award for Best Animated Feature.
Atlantis: The Lost Empire	June 3, 2001 (El Capitan Theatre); June 15, 2001 (official release)	—N/a	Traditional animation	Walt Disney Pictures; Walt Disney Feature Animation	Buena Vista Pictures Distribution	96	$90,000,000	$186,053,725	The 41st animated film from Walt Disney Feature Animation. Also spawned into a 2003 direct-to-video sequel.
Jin-Roh: The Wolf Brigade	June 22, 2001	—N/a	Anime	Production I.G	Tidepoint Pictures	102	—N/a	$94,591	The first animated film from Tidepoint Pictures.
Final Fantasy: The Spirits Within	July 2, 2001 (Fox Bruin Theater); July 11, 2001 (official release)	—N/a	Computer animation	Columbia Pictures; Square Pictures	Sony Pictures Releasing	106	$137,000,000	$85,131,830	The 10th animated film from Columbia Pictures and the first photorealistic computer-animated film.
Osmosis Jones	August 7, 2001 (Grauman's Egyptian Theatre); August 10, 2001 (official release)	—N/a	Traditional animation/Live-action	Warner Bros. Feature Animation; Conundrum Entertainment	Warner Bros. Pictures	95	$70,000,000	$14,026,418	The third Warner Bros. animated film with live-action and the fourth animated film from Warner Bros. Feature Animation.
Blood: The Last Vampire	August 18, 2001	—N/a	Anime	Production I.G	Manga Entertainment	45	—N/a	—N/a	The third animated film from Manga Entertainment.
Vampire Hunter D: Bloodlust	September 21, 2001	—N/a	Anime	Madhouse	Urban Vision Entertainment	102	—N/a	$151,086	The first animated film from Urban Vision Entertainment and the first animated film to be released after the September 11 attacks.
Spriggan	October 12, 2001	—N/a	Anime	Studio 4°C	ADV Films	91	—N/a	$25,824	The first animated film from ADV Films.
Waking Life	January 23, 2001 (Sundance Film Festival); October 19, 2001 (limited release)	—N/a	Rotoscoping	Thousand Words	Fox Searchlight Pictures	101	—N/a	$3,176,880	The first animated film from Richard Linklater and the first animated film from Fox Searchlight Pictures.
Monsters, Inc.	October 28, 2001 (El Capitan Theatre); November 2, 2001 (official release)	For the Birds	Computer animation	Walt Disney Pictures; Pixar Animation Studios	Buena Vista Pictures Distribution	92	$115,000,000	$528,773,250	The fourth animated film from Pixar Animation Studios. Nominee of an Academy Award for Best Animated Feature and was re-released in 3D in 2012.
Ramayana: The Legend of Prince Rama	November 9, 2001	—N/a	Anime	Nippon Ramayana Film Co.	Showcase Entertainment	135	$13,000,000	—N/a	The first animated film from Showcase Entertainment.
Jimmy Neutron: Boy Genius	December 9, 2001 (Paramount Studios); December 21, 2001 (official release)	—N/a	Computer animation	Nickelodeon Movies; O Entertainment; DNA Productions	Paramount Pictures	82	$30,000,000	$102,992,536	The 14th animated film from Paramount Pictures and the third animated film from Nickelodeon Movies. Nominee of an Academy Award for Best Animated Feature.
Marco Polo: Return to Xanadu	December 28, 2001	—N/a	Traditional animation	Animation International Inc. Porter Animations	Tooniversal Company	86	—N/a	—N/a	A remake of Marco Polo Junior Versus the Red Dragon, with additional sequences added.
Metropolis	January 25, 2002	—N/a	Anime	TriStar Pictures; Madhouse	Sony Pictures Releasing	107	$15,000,000	$4,035,192	The third animated film from TriStar Pictures.
Escaflowne	January 25, 2002	—N/a	Anime	Bones; Sunrise	JVCKenwood Victor Entertainment	98	—N/a	$94,060	The first animated film from JVCKenwood Victor Entertainment.
Return to Never Land	February 10, 2002 (El Capitan Theatre); February 15, 2002 (official release)	Pluto's Fledgling	Traditional animation	Walt Disney Pictures; Disney MovieToons; Walt Disney Television Animation	Buena Vista Pictures Distribution	72	$20,000,000	$115,121,981	A sequel to Peter Pan, the fourth animated film from Disney MovieToons and the sixth animated film from Walt Disney Television Animation.
Ice Age	March 10, 2002 (Radio City Music Hall); March 15, 2002 (official release)	—N/a	Computer animation	20th Century Fox Animation; Blue Sky Studios	20th Century Fox	81	$59,000,000	$383,257,136	The 11th animated film from 20th Century Fox, the third animated film from 20th Century Fox Animation and the first animated film from Blue Sky Studios. Nominee of an Academy Award for Best Animated Feature.
Mutant Aliens	April 19, 2002	—N/a	Traditional animation	Plymptoons	Apollo Films	81	—N/a	—N/a	The third animated film from Bill Plympton and the first animated film from Apollo Films.
Spirit: Stallion of the Cimarron	May 19, 2002 (Cinerama Dome); May 24, 2002 (official release)	—N/a	Traditional animation	DreamWorks Animation	DreamWorks Pictures	83	$80,000,000	$122,563,539	The sixth animated film from DreamWorks Pictures and the sixth animated film from DreamWorks Animation. Nominee of an Academy Award for Best Animated Feature.
Scooby-Doo	June 8, 2002 (Grauman's Chinese Theatre); June 14, 2002 (official release)	—N/a	Computer animation/Live-action	Mosaic Media Group; Atlas Entertainment	Warner Bros. Pictures	86	$84,000,000	$275,650,703	The fourth Warner Bros. animated film with live-action and the first animated film to feature Scooby-Doo.
Lilo & Stitch	June 16, 2002 (El Capitan Theatre); June 21, 2002 (official release)	—N/a	Traditional animation	Walt Disney Pictures; Walt Disney Feature Animation	Buena Vista Pictures Distribution	85	$80,000,000	$273,144,151	The 42nd animated film from Walt Disney Feature Animation and the second Disney animated film to be produced at Disney's Hollywood Studios. Nominee of an Academy Award for Best Animated Feature and also spawned into three direct-to-video sequels. Adapted into a 2025 live-action film.
Hey Arnold!: The Movie	June 23, 2002 (Paramount Studios); June 28, 2002 (official release)	—N/a	Traditional animation	Nickelodeon Movies; Snee-Oosh; Nickelodeon Animation Studio	Paramount Pictures	75	$4,000,000	$15,249,308	The 15th animated film from Paramount Pictures and the fourth animated film from Nickelodeon Movies. Also spawned into a 2017 made-for-TV sequel.
The Powerpuff Girls Movie	June 22, 2002 (AMC Century Plaza Theater); July 3, 2002 (official release)	Dexter's Laboratory: Chicken Scratch	Traditional animation	Cartoon Network Studios	Warner Bros. Pictures	73	$11,000,000	$16,426,471	The 23rd animated film from Warner Bros. Pictures and the first animated film from Cartoon Network.
Stuart Little 2	July 14, 2002 (Westwood Village Theatre); July 19, 2002 (official release)	—N/a	Computer animation/Live-action	Columbia Pictures; Red Wagon Entertainment	Sony Pictures Releasing	78	$120,000,000	$169,956,806	A sequel to Stuart Little and the third Columbia animated film with live-action. Also spawned into a 2005 direct-to-video sequel.
The Princess and the Pea	August 16, 2002	—N/a	Traditional animation	Feature Films for Families	Swan Productions	85	—N/a	—N/a	The first animated film from Swan Productions.
Spirited Away	April 20, 2002 (San Francisco International Film Festival); August 31, 2002 (Telluride Film Festival); September 20, 2002 (El Capitan Theatre); October 4, 2002 (limited release)	—N/a	Anime	Walt Disney Pictures; Studio Ghibli	Buena Vista Pictures Distribution	124	$15,000,000	$383,397,782	The fifth animated Studio Ghibli film to be theatrically released in the United States and the first Studio Ghibli film distributed by Disney. Winner of an Academy Award for Best Animated Feature.
Jonah: A VeggieTales Movie	August 14, 2002 (A Hollywood movie theater); October 4, 2002 (official release)	—N/a	Computer animation	Big Idea Entertainment; F.H.E. Pictures	Artisan Entertainment	83	$14,000,000	$25,615,231	The first animated film from Artisan Entertainment, the first animated film from Big Idea and the first animated film to be based on VeggieTales.
Pokémon 4Ever	October 11, 2002	—N/a	Anime	4Kids Entertainment; OLM	Miramax Films	79	—N/a	$28,023,563	A sequel to Pokémon: The First Movie, Pokémon: The Movie 2000 and Pokémon 3: The Movie, and the sixth animated film from Miramax Films.
Santa vs. the Snowman 3D	November 1, 2002	—N/a	Computer animation	O Entertainment; DNA Productions	IMAX	32	—N/a	$8,198,286	Originally produced as a television special in 1997.
The Living Forest	November 8, 2002	—N/a	Computer animation	Dygra Films; Megatrix Sau	Dygra Films	80	—N/a	—N/a	The first animated film from Dygra Films.
Alibaba	November 22, 2002	—N/a	Computer animation	Pentamedia Graphics	Swingin' Productions	85	—N/a	—N/a	The first animated film from Swingin' Productions.
Eight Crazy Nights	November 27, 2002	A Day with the Meatball	Traditional animation	Columbia Pictures; Happy Madison Productions	Sony Pictures Releasing	76	—N/a	$23,833,131	The 11th animated film from Columbia Pictures and the first animated theatrical Hanukkah-themed film.
Treasure Planet	November 17, 2002 (Cinerama Dome); November 27, 2002 (official release)	—N/a	Traditional animation	Walt Disney Pictures; Walt Disney Feature Animation	Buena Vista Pictures Distribution	95	$140,000,000	$109,578,115	The 43rd animated film from Walt Disney Feature Animation. Nominee of an Academy Award for Best Animated Feature.
Eden	December 13, 2002	—N/a	Traditional animation	EuropaCorp		85	—N/a	—N/a	The first animated film from EuropaCorp.
The Wild Thornberrys Movie	September 8, 2002 (TIFF); December 8, 2002 (Cinerama Dome); December 20, 2002 (official release)	—N/a	Traditional animation	Nickelodeon Movies; Klasky Csupo	Paramount Pictures	85	$25 million	$60,694,737	The 16th animated film from Paramount Pictures and the fifth animated film from Nickelodeon Movies.
WXIII: Patlabor the Movie 3	January 10, 2003	—N/a	Anime	Madhouse; Bandai Visual; Tohokushinsha Film	Pioneer Entertainment	94	—N/a	—N/a	Set between Patlabor: The Movie and Patlabor 2: The Movie, and the second animated film from Pioneer Entertainment.
Kangaroo Jack	January 11, 2003 (Grauman's Chinese Theatre); January 17, 2003 (official release)	—N/a	Computer animation/Live-action	Castle Rock Entertainment; Jerry Bruckheimer Films	Warner Bros. Pictures	89	$60,000,000	$88,929,111	The fifth Warner Bros. animated film with live-action and the first animated film from Castle Rock Entertainment. Also spawned into a 2004 direct-to-video sequel.
The Jungle Book 2	February 9, 2003 (El Capitan Theatre); February 14, 2003 (official release)	—N/a	Traditional animation	Walt Disney Pictures; DisneyToon Studios	Buena Vista Pictures Distribution	72	$20,000,000	$135,703,599	A sequel to The Jungle Book and the fifth animated film from DisneyToon Studios.
Piglet's Big Movie	March 16, 2003 (El Capitan Theatre); March 21, 2003 (official release)	—N/a	Traditional animation	Walt Disney Pictures; DisneyToon Studios	Buena Vista Pictures Distribution	75	$46,000,000	$62,870,546	A sequel to The Many Adventures of Winnie the Pooh and The Tigger Movie, and the sixth animated film from DisneyToon Studios.
Cowboy Bebop: The Movie	April 4, 2003	—N/a	Anime	Sunrise; Bones; Bandai Visual	IDP Distribution	115	—N/a	$3,007,903	The first animated film from IDP Distribution.
Pokémon Heroes	May 16, 2003	—N/a	Anime	4Kids Entertainment; OLM	Miramax Films	72	—N/a	$746,381	A sequel to Pokémon: The First Movie, Pokémon: The Movie 2000, Pokémon 3: The Movie and Pokémon 4Ever, and the seventh animated film from Miramax Films.
Finding Nemo	May 18, 2003 (El Capitan Theatre); May 30, 2003 (official release)	Knick Knack; Partysaurus Rex (2012 3D re-issue)	Computer animation	Walt Disney Pictures; Pixar Animation Studios	Buena Vista Pictures Distribution	100	$94,000,000	$871,014,978	The fifth animated film from Pixar Animation Studios. Winner of an Academy Award for Best Animated Feature, nominee of a Golden Globe Award for Best Motion Picture – Musical or Comedy and was re-released in 3D in 2012.
Rugrats Go Wild	June 1, 2003 (Cinerama Dome); June 13, 2003 (official release)	—N/a	Traditional animation	Nickelodeon Movies; Klasky Csupo	Paramount Pictures	81	$25,000,000	$55,250,496	A sequel to The Rugrats Movie, Rugrats in Paris: The Movie and The Wild Thornberrys Movie, the 17th animated film from Paramount Pictures, the sixth animated film from Nickelodeon Movies and the first animated film to be presented in Odorama.
Sinbad: Legend of the Seven Seas	June 17, 2003 (Beekman Theatre); July 2, 2003 (official release)	—N/a	Traditional animation	DreamWorks Animation	DreamWorks Pictures	85	$60,000,000	$80,773,077	The seventh animated film from DreamWorks Pictures, the seventh animated film from DreamWorks Animation and the last DreamWorks traditionally animated film.
Sakura Wars: The Movie	July 18, 2003	—N/a	Anime	Production I.G	Pioneer Entertainment	85	$4,731,555	$26,492,620	The third animated film from Pioneer Entertainment.
Son of Alladin	August 29, 2003	—N/a	Computer animation	Pentamedia Graphics	Shemaroo Video	80	—N/a	—N/a	The first animated film from Shemaroo Video.
Millennium Actress	September 12, 2003	—N/a	Anime	Madhouse	Go Fish Pictures	87	$1,200,000	$37,641	The first animated film from Go Fish Pictures.
Rescue Heroes: The Movie	October 24, 2003 (Chicago)	—N/a	Computer animation	Nelvana; Fisher-Price	Artisan Entertainment	78	—N/a	—N/a	The second animated film from Artisan Entertainment, the eighth animated film from Nelvana and the first animated film from Fisher-Price.
Brother Bear	October 20, 2003 (New Amsterdam Theatre); November 1, 2003 (official release)	—N/a	Traditional animation	Walt Disney Pictures; Walt Disney Feature Animation	Buena Vista Pictures Distribution	85	$46,000,000	$250,397,798	The 44th animated film from Walt Disney Feature Animation and the third Disney animated film to be produced at Disney's Hollywood Studios. Nominee of an Academy Award for Best Animated Feature and also spawned into a 2006 direct-to-video sequel.
Looney Tunes: Back in Action	November 9, 2003 (Grauman's Chinese Theatre); November 14, 2003 (official release)	—N/a	Traditional animation/Computer animation/Live-action	Warner Bros. Feature Animation; Baltimore Spring Creek Productions; Goldmann Pictures	Warner Bros. Pictures	91	$80,000,000	$68,514,844	The sixth Warner Bros. animated film with live-action and the fifth animated film from Warner Bros. Feature Animation.
The Triplets of Belleville	November 26, 2003	—N/a	Traditional animation	Les Armateurs; Production Champion; Vivi Film; France 3 Cinéma	Sony Pictures Classics	80	$9,500,000	$14,776,760	The first animated film from Sylvain Chomet and the first animated film from Sony Pictures Classics. Entered into the 2003 Cannes Film Festival and nominee of an Academy Award for Best Animated Feature.
The Golden Laws	December 5, 2003	—N/a	Anime	Group TAC; IRH Press Co. Toei Animation	Triumph Films	109	—N/a	—N/a	The first animated film from Triumph Films.
Jester Till	December 12, 2003	—N/a	Traditional animation	Munich Animation	Constantin Film	81	—N/a	—N/a	The first animated film from Constantin Film.
Teacher's Pet	January 11, 2004 (El Capitan Theatre); January 16, 2004 (official release)	—N/a	Traditional animation	Walt Disney Pictures; Walt Disney Television Animation	Buena Vista Pictures Distribution	74	$10,000,000	$6,491,969	The seventh animated film from Walt Disney Television Animation.
Tokyo Godfathers	January 16, 2004	—N/a	Anime	Madhouse	IDP Distribution	92	$2,400,000	$148,355	The second animated film from IDP Distribution.
Clifford's Really Big Movie	February 20, 2004 (limited release); April 23, 2004 (official release)	—N/a	Traditional animation	Scholastic Entertainment; Big Red Dog Productions	Warner Bros. Pictures	74	$70,000	$3,255,426	The 24th animated film from Warner Bros. Pictures and the first animated film from Scholastic. Rights later went to Scholastic Media.
Scooby-Doo 2: Monsters Unleashed	March 20, 2004 (Grauman's Chinese Theatre); March 26, 2004 (official release)	—N/a	Computer animation/Live-action	Mosaic Media Group	Warner Bros. Pictures	92	$25,000,000	$181,216,833	A sequel to Scooby-Doo and the seventh Warner Bros. animated film with live-action.
Home on the Range	March 21, 2004 (El Capitan Theatre); April 2, 2004 (official release)	—N/a	Traditional animation	Walt Disney Pictures; Walt Disney Feature Animation	Buena Vista Pictures Distribution	76	$110,000,000	$145,358,062	The 45th animated film from Walt Disney Feature Animation and the last Disney hand-drawn animated film for five years, until 2009's The Princess and the Frog.
Tamala 2010: A Punk Cat in Space	April 2, 2004	—N/a	Anime	Kinétique	Vitagraph Films	92	—N/a	$3,386	The first animated film from Vitagraph Films.
Shrek 2	May 8, 2004 (Westwood Village Theatre); May 15, 2004 (2004 Cannes Film Festival); May 19, 2004 (official release)	—N/a	Computer animation	DreamWorks Animation; PDI/DreamWorks	DreamWorks Pictures	92	$70–150 million	$928,760,770	A sequel to Shrek, the eighth animated film from DreamWorks Pictures and the eighth animated film from DreamWorks Animation. Entered into the 2004 Cannes Film Festival and nominee of an Academy Award for Best Animated Feature.
Garfield: The Movie	June 6, 2004 (Zanuck Theater); June 11, 2004 (official release)	Gone Nutty	Computer animation/Live-action	Davis Entertainment; Paws, Inc.	20th Century Fox	80	$50,000,000	$203,172,417	The fourth Fox animated film with live-action and the first animated film from Davis Entertainment.
Kaena: The Prophecy	July 9, 2004	—N/a	Computer animation	Xilam	Destination Films	91	—N/a	$465,618	The first animated film from Destination Films.
Yu-Gi-Oh! The Movie: Pyramid of Light	August 7, 2004 (Grauman's Chinese Theatre); August 13, 2004 (official release)	—N/a	Anime	4Kids Entertainment; Studio Gallop	Warner Bros. Pictures	89	$20,000,000	$29,266,490	The 25th animated film from Warner Bros. Pictures and the first animated film to based on Yu-Gi-Oh.
Ghost in the Shell 2: Innocence	September 17, 2004	—N/a	Anime	Production I.G; Studio Ghibli	Go Fish Pictures	100	$20,000,000	$9,789,651	A sequel to Ghost in the Shell, the second animated film from Go Fish Pictures and the sixth animated Studio Ghibli film to be theatrically released in the United States.
Shark Tale	September 10, 2004 (Venice Film Festival); September 27, 2004 (Delacorte Theater); October 1, 2004 (official release)	—N/a	Computer animation	DreamWorks Animation	DreamWorks Pictures	89	$75,000,000	$374,583,879	The ninth animated film from DreamWorks Pictures and the ninth animated film from DreamWorks Animation. Nominee of an Academy Award for Best Animated Feature.
The Legend of Buddha	October 22, 2004	—N/a	Traditional animation	Pentamedia Graphics	Kingdom Animasia	87	—N/a	—N/a	The first animated film from Kingdom Animasia.
Spookley the Square Pumpkin	October 30, 2004	—N/a	Computer animation	Holliday Hill Farm	Kidtoon Films	47	—N/a	—N/a	The first animated film from Kidtoon Films. Also spawned into a 2019 sequel, Spookley and the Christmas Kittens.
The Incredibles	October 24, 2004 (El Capitan Theatre); October 27, 2004 (BFI London Film Festival); November 5, 2004 (official release)	Boundin'	Computer animation	Walt Disney Pictures; Pixar Animation Studios	Buena Vista Pictures Distribution	115	$92,000,000	$631,442,092	The sixth animated film from Pixar Animation Studios. Winner of an Academy Award for Best Animated Feature and nominee of a Golden Globe Award for Best Motion Picture – Musical or Comedy.
The Polar Express	October 21, 2004 (Chicago International Film Festival); November 7, 2004 (Grauman's Chinese Theatre); November 10, 2004 (official release)	—N/a	Computer animation	Castle Rock Entertainment; Shangri-La Entertainment; ImageMovers; Playtone	Warner Bros. Pictures	100	$165,000,000	$286,000,505	The 26th animated film from Warner Bros. Pictures, the second animated film from Castle Rock Entertainment, the first animated film from ImageMovers and the first all-digital motion capture film.
Muhammad: The Last Prophet	November 14, 2004	—N/a	Traditional animation	RichCrest Animation Studios	Fine Media Group	91	—N/a	$641,473	The fifth animated film from RichCrest Animation Studios.
The SpongeBob SquarePants Movie	November 14, 2004 (Grauman's Chinese Theatre); November 19, 2004 (official release)	—N/a	Traditional animation/Live-action	Nickelodeon Movies; United Plankton Pictures	Paramount Pictures	87	$30,000,000	$140,192,993	The 18th animated film from Paramount Pictures, the seventh animated film from Nickelodeon Movies and the first animated film to feature SpongeBob SquarePants.
Fat Albert	December 10, 2004 (Temple University Liacouras Center); December 25, 2004 (official release)	—N/a	Traditional animation/Live-action	Davis Entertainment; SAH Enterprises	20th Century Fox	93	$45,000,000	$48,551,322	The fifth Fox animated film with live-action and the second animated film from Davis Entertainment.
Sky Blue	December 31, 2004	—N/a	Anime	Maxmedia/Endgame Pictures	Palisades Tartan	86	—N/a	$197,221	The first animated film from Palisades Tartan.
Appleseed	January 14, 2005	—N/a	Computer animation	Digital Frontier	Geneon Entertainment	103	$10,000,000	$1,650,432	The first animated film from Geneon Entertainment.
Pooh's Heffalump Movie	February 5, 2005 (AMC Lincoln Square Theatre); February 11, 2005 (official release)	—N/a	Traditional animation	Walt Disney Pictures; DisneyToon Studios	Buena Vista Pictures Distribution	68	$20,000,000	$52,858,433	A sequel to The Many Adventures of Winnie the Pooh, The Tigger Movie and Piglet's Big Movie, and the seventh animated film from DisneyToon Studios.
Robots	March 6, 2005 (Westwood Village Theatre); March 11, 2005 (official release)	—N/a	Computer animation	20th Century Fox Animation; Blue Sky Studios	20th Century Fox	90	$75,000,000	$262,511,490	The 12th animated film from 20th Century Fox, the fourth animated film from 20th Century Fox Animation and the second animated film from Blue Sky Studios.
Steamboy	March 18, 2005	—N/a	Anime	Sunrise; Bandai Visual	Triumph Films	104	$26,000,000	$10,870,198	The second animated film from Triumph Films.
The Golden Blaze	April 2, 2005	—N/a	Flash animation	Urban Entertainment	Kidtoon Films	94	—N/a	—N/a	The second animated film from Kidtoon Films.
Madagascar	May 15, 2005 (Ziegfeld Theatre); May 27, 2005 (official release)	—N/a	Computer animation	DreamWorks Animation; PDI/DreamWorks	DreamWorks Pictures	86	$75,000,000	$542,063,846	The 10th animated film from DreamWorks Pictures and the 10th animated film from DreamWorks Animation.
Howl's Moving Castle	June 10, 2005 (limited release); June 17, 2005 (official release)	—N/a	Anime	Walt Disney Pictures; Studio Ghibli	Buena Vista Pictures Distribution	119	$24,000,000	$236,214,446	The seventh animated Studio Ghibli film to be theatrically released in the United States and the second Studio Ghibli film distributed by Disney. Nominee of an Academy Award for Best Animated Feature.
Valiant	August 19, 2005	—N/a	Computer animation	Walt Disney Pictures; Vanguard Animation; Ealing Studios; UK Film Council	Buena Vista Pictures Distribution	76	$35,000,000	$61,746,888	The first animated film from Vanguard Animation and the first foreign non-Studio Ghibli animated film to be released theatrically by Disney.
Corpse Bride	September 10, 2005 (TIFF); September 23, 2005 (official release)	—N/a	Stop-motion	Tim Burton Productions; Laika; Patalex II Productions	Warner Bros. Pictures	77	$40,000,000	$118,090,836	The third animated film from Tim Burton, the 27th animated film from Warner Bros. Pictures and the first animated film from Laika. Nominee of an Academy Award for Best Animated Feature.
Wallace & Gromit: The Curse of the Were-Rabbit	October 2, 2005 (Odeon Leicester Square); October 7, 2005 (official release)	The Madagascar Penguins in a Christmas Caper	Stop-motion	DreamWorks Animation; Aardman Animations	DreamWorks Pictures	84	$30,000,000	$194,111,171	The 11th animated film from DreamWorks Pictures, the 11th animated film from DreamWorks Animation and the second animated film from Aardman. Winner of an Academy Award for Best Animated Feature and also spawned into a 2025 sequel, Wallace & Gromit: Vengeance Most Fowl.
Chicken Little	October 30, 2005 (El Capitan Theatre); November 4, 2005 (official release)	—N/a	Computer animation	Walt Disney Pictures; Walt Disney Feature Animation	Buena Vista Pictures Distribution	81	$150,000,000	$314,432,837	The 46th animated film from Walt Disney Feature Animation and the first Disney animated film to be released in 3D.
Hoodwinked!	December 5, 2005 (Clearview's 62nd Street Theatre); December 16, 2005 (limited release); January 13, 2006 (official release)	—N/a	Computer animation	Kanbar Entertainment; Blue Yonder Films	The Weinstein Company	81	$8,000,000	$110,013,167	The first animated film from The Weinstein Company and one of the first computer-animated films to be independently funded.
Live Freaky! Die Freaky!	January 27, 2006	—N/a	Stop-motion	You've Got Bad Taste Productions; Hellcat Films	Wellspring Media	76	$100,000	$11,290	The first animated film from Wellspring Media.
Curious George	January 28, 2006 (Arclight Theatre); February 10, 2006 (official release)	—N/a	Traditional animation	Universal Animation Studios; Imagine Entertainment	Universal Pictures	87	$50,000,000	$69,865,924	The ninth animated film from Universal Pictures and the first animated film from Universal Animation Studios. Also spawned into four direct-to-video sequels.
Doogal	February 24, 2006	—N/a	Computer animation	Action Synthese	The Weinstein Company; Pathé	77	$20,000,000	$26,711,924	The second animated film from The Weinstein Company and the second animated film from Pathé. An American version of 2005's The Magic Roundabout.
Ice Age: The Meltdown	March 19, 2006 (Grauman's Chinese Theatre); March 31, 2006 (official release)	—N/a	Computer animation	20th Century Fox Animation; Blue Sky Studios	20th Century Fox	90	$80,000,000	$660,998,756	A sequel to Ice Age, the 13th animated film from 20th Century Fox, the fifth animated film from 20th Century Fox Animation and the third animated film from Blue Sky Studios.
Pinocchio 3000	April 1, 2006	—N/a	Computer animation	CinéGroupe; Filmax; Anima Kids	Kidtoon Films	79	$12,000,000	$1,464,478	The third animated film from Kidtoon Films and the first animated film from CinéGroupe.
The Wild	April 14, 2006	—N/a	Computer animation	Walt Disney Pictures; C.O.R.E. Feature Animation	Buena Vista Pictures Distribution	81	$80,000,000	$102,338,515	The first animated film from C.O.R.E. Feature Animation.
Over the Hedge	April 30, 2006 (Westwood Village Theatre); May 19, 2006 (official release)	First Flight (LA and NY only)	Computer animation	DreamWorks Animation	Paramount Pictures	83	$80,000,000	$339,795,890	The 19th animated film from Paramount Pictures and the 12th animated film from DreamWorks Animation.
Cars	May 26, 2006 (Charlotte Motor Speedway); June 9, 2006 (official release)	One Man Band	Computer animation	Walt Disney Pictures; Pixar Animation Studios	Buena Vista Pictures Distribution	116	$120,000,000	$461,983,149	The seventh animated film from Pixar Animation Studios. Nominee of an Academy Award for Best Animated Feature and winner of the first-ever Golden Globe Award for Best Animated Feature Film.
Garfield: A Tail of Two Kitties	June 16, 2006	—N/a	Computer animation/Live-action	Davis Entertainment; Paws, Inc.	20th Century Fox	78	$60,000,000	$143,325,970	A sequel to Garfield: The Movie, the sixth Fox animated film with live-action and the third animated film from Davis Entertainment.
A Scanner Darkly	June 29, 2006 (Ford Theatre); July 7, 2006 (official release)	—N/a	Rotoscoping	Thousand Words; Section Eight Productions; Detour Filmproduction; 3 Arts Entertainment	Warner Independent Pictures	100	$8,700,000	$7,659,918	The second animated film from Richard Linklater and the first animated film from Warner Independent Pictures. Entered into the 2006 Cannes Film Festival.
Monster House	July 17, 2006 (Westwood Village Theatre); July 21, 2006 (official release)	—N/a	Computer animation	Columbia Pictures; Relativity Media; ImageMovers; Amblin Entertainment	Sony Pictures Releasing	90	$75,000,000	$141,861,243	The 12th animated film from Columbia Pictures, the first animated film from Relativity Media, the second animated film from ImageMovers, and the ninth animated film from Amblin Entertainment. Nominee of an Academy Award for Best Animated Feature and a Golden Globe Award for Best Animated Feature Film.
The Ant Bully	July 23, 2006 (Grauman's Chinese Theatre); July 28, 2006 (official release)	—N/a	Computer animation	Legendary Pictures; Playtone; DNA Productions	Warner Bros. Pictures	89	$50,000,000	$55,181,129	The 28th animated film from Warner Bros. Pictures and the first animated film from Legendary Pictures.
Barnyard	July 30, 2006 (Cinerama Dome); August 4, 2006 (official release)	—N/a	Computer animation	Nickelodeon Movies; O Entertainment	Paramount Pictures	89	$51,000,000	$116,755,080	The 20th animated film from Paramount Pictures and the eighth animated film from Nickelodeon Movies.
Hair High	August 4, 2006	—N/a	Traditional animation	Plymptoons	Starz Distribution	77	$400,000	$5,342	The fourth animated film from Bill Plympton and the first animated film from Starz Distribution.
Everyone's Hero	September 12, 2006 (AMC Lincoln Square Theatre); September 15, 2006 (official release)	—N/a	Computer animation	IDT Entertainment	20th Century Fox	87	$35,000,000	$16,627,188	The 14th animated film from 20th Century Fox and the first animated film from IDT Entertainment.
Captain Sabertooth	September 22, 2006	—N/a	Traditional animation	Seven Seas Production A/S; Happy Life Animation; Svensk Filmindustri; TV 2 Norge; Varga Studio	Indican Pictures	74	—N/a	$1,361,061	The first animated film from Indican Pictures.
Renaissance	September 22, 2006	—N/a	Computer animation	Onyx Films; Millimages; LuxAnimation; France 2 Cinéma	Miramax Films	105	$18,000,000	$1,831,348	The eighth animated film from Miramax Films.
Open Season	September 25, 2006 (Greek Theatre); September 29, 2006 (official release)	—N/a	Computer animation	Columbia Pictures; Sony Pictures Animation	Sony Pictures Releasing	86	$85,000,000	$200,811,689	The 13th animated film from Columbia Pictures and the first animated film from Sony Pictures Animation. Also spawned into three direct-to-video sequels.
Blood Tea and Red String	October 4, 2006	—N/a	Stop-motion	Cinema Epoch		70	—N/a	—N/a	The first animated film from Cinema Epoch.
Romeo & Juliet: Sealed with a Kiss	October 27, 2006	—N/a	Flash animation	Phil Nibbelink Productions	Indican Pictures	76	$2,000,000	$463,002	The second animated film from Indican Pictures.
Flushed Away	October 29, 2006 (AMC Lincoln Square Theatre); November 3, 2006 (official release)	—N/a	Computer animation	DreamWorks Animation; Aardman Animations	Paramount Pictures	85	$149,000,000	$178,281,554	The 21st animated film from Paramount Pictures, the 13th animated film from DreamWorks Animation and the third animated film from Aardman.
Happy Feet	November 12, 2006 (Grauman's Chinese Theatre); November 17, 2006 (official release)	—N/a	Computer animation	Village Roadshow Pictures; Animal Logic; Kennedy Miller Productions	Warner Bros. Pictures	108	$100,000,000	$384,335,608	The 29th animated film from Warner Bros. Pictures, the first animated film from Village Roadshow Pictures and the first animated film from Animal Logic. Winner of an Academy Award for Best Animated Feature and nominee of a Golden Globe Award for Best Animated Feature Film.
Arthur and the Invisibles	December 29, 2006 (limited release); January 12, 2007 (official release)	—N/a	Computer animation/Live-action	Avalanche Productions; Metro Voices; Canal+	Metro-Goldwyn-Mayer	93	$85,000,000	$107,944,236	The second MGM animated film with live-action. Also spawned into two sequels, Arthur and the Revenge of Maltazard and Arthur 3: The War of the Two Worlds.
Happily N'Ever After	December 16, 2006 (Mann Festival Theater); January 5, 2007 (official release)	—N/a	Computer animation	Vanguard Animation	Lionsgate	87	$47,000,000	$38,085,778	The third animated film from Lionsgate and the second animated film from Vanguard Animation. Also spawned into a 2009 direct-to-video sequel.
My Little Pony: A Very Pony Place	January 6, 2007	—N/a	Traditional animation	SD Entertainment; Hasbro	Kidtoon Films	45	—N/a	—N/a	A sequel to My Little Pony: A Very Minty Christmas, My Little Pony: The Princess Promenade and My Little Pony Crystal Princess: The Runaway Rainbow, the seventh animated film from Kidtoon Films and the seventh animated film from SD Entertainment.
Strawberry Shortcake: Berry Blossom Festival	March 3, 2007	—N/a	Traditional animation	DIC Entertainment; American Greetings	Kidtoon Films	43	—N/a	—N/a	The eighth animated film from Kidtoon Films and the fourth animated film from DIC Entertainment.
TMNT	March 17, 2007 (Grauman's Chinese Theatre); March 23, 2007 (official release)	—N/a	Computer animation	Imagi Animation Studios; The Weinstein Company	Warner Bros. Pictures	87	$34,000,000	$95,802,916	The 30th animated film from Warner Bros. Pictures, the third animated film from The Weinstein Company, the first animated film from Imagi Animation Studios and the first animated film to feature the Teenage Mutant Ninja Turtles.
Meet the Robinsons	March 25, 2007 (El Capitan Theatre); March 30, 2007 (official release)	Working for Peanuts (3D version); Boat Builders (2D version)	Computer animation	Walt Disney Pictures; Walt Disney Animation Studios	Buena Vista Pictures Distribution	94	$150,000,000	$169,333,034	The 47th animated film from Walt Disney Animation Studios.
Aqua Teen Hunger Force Colon Movie Film for Theaters	April 10, 2007 (Chelsea West Theater); April 13, 2007 (official release)	—N/a	Flash animation	Williams Street	First Look Pictures	85	$750,000	$5,520,368	The first animated film from First Look Pictures.
Shrek the Third	May 6, 2007 (Westwood Village Theatre); May 18, 2007 (official release)	—N/a	Computer animation	DreamWorks Animation; PDI/DreamWorks	Paramount Pictures	93	$160 million	$813,367,380	A sequel to Shrek and Shrek 2, the 22nd animated film from Paramount Pictures and the 14th animated film from DreamWorks Animation.
Paprika	May 25, 2007	—N/a	Anime	Madhouse	Sony Pictures Classics	90	$2,845,085	$944,915	The second animated film from Sony Pictures Classics.
Holly Hobbie & Friends: Best Friends Forever	June 2, 2007	—N/a	Traditional animation	American Greetings	Kidtoon Films	44	—N/a	—N/a	The ninth animated film from Kidtoon Films.
Surf's Up	June 2, 2007 (Westwood Village Theatre); June 8, 2007 (official release)	—N/a	Computer animation	Columbia Pictures; Sony Pictures Animation	Sony Pictures Releasing	85	$100,000,000	$152,005,713	The 14th animated film from Columbia Pictures and the second animated film from Sony Pictures Animation. Nominee of an Academy Award for Best Animated Feature and also spawned into a 2017 direct-to-video sequel.
Ratatouille	June 22, 2007 (Kodak Theatre); June 29, 2007 (official release)	Lifted	Computer animation	Walt Disney Pictures; Pixar Animation Studios	Buena Vista Pictures Distribution	111	$150,000,000	$623,726,085	The eighth animated film from Pixar Animation Studios. Winner of an Academy Award for Best Animated Feature and a Golden Globe Award for Best Animated Feature Film.
Tekkonkinkreet	July 13, 2007	—N/a	Anime	Studio 4°C	Sony Pictures Releasing	110	—N/a	$42,840	The first animated film from Sony Pictures Releasing.
The Simpsons Movie	July 21, 2007 (Springfield, Vermont); July 27, 2007 (official release)	—N/a	Traditional animation	20th Century Fox Animation; Gracie Films	20th Century Fox	87	$75,000,000	$536,414,270	The 15th animated film from 20th Century Fox, the sixth animated film from 20th Century Fox Animation and the first animated film to be based on The Simpsons. Nominee of a Golden Globe Award for Best Animated Feature Film.
Care Bears: Oopsy Does It!	August 4, 2007	—N/a	Computer animation	SD Entertainment; American Greetings; The Hatchery	Kidtoon Films	71	—N/a	—N/a	The 10th animated film from Kidtoon Films and the eighth animated film from SD Entertainment.
Strawberry Shortcake: Let's Dance	September 1, 2007	—N/a	Traditional animation	DIC Entertainment; American Greetings	Kidtoon Films	45	—N/a	—N/a	The 11th animated film from Kidtoon Films and the fifth animated film from DIC Entertainment.
The Ten Commandments	October 19, 2007	—N/a	Computer animation	Huhu Studios iVL Animation; Sparky Animation; Ten Chimneys Entertainment	Promenade Pictures	84	$10,000,000	$1,051,907	The first animated film from Promenade Pictures.
Bee Movie	October 28, 2007 (Westwood Village Theatre); November 2, 2007 (official release)	—N/a	Computer animation	DreamWorks Animation; Columbus 81 Productions	Paramount Pictures	90	$150,000,000	$293,514,336	The 23rd animated film from Paramount Pictures and the 15th animated film from DreamWorks Animation. Nominee of a Golden Globe Award for Best Animated Feature Film.
Beowulf	November 5, 2007 (Westwood Village Theatre); November 16, 2007 (official release)	—N/a	Computer animation	Warner Bros. Pictures; ImageMovers; Shangri-La Entertainment	Paramount Pictures	114	$150,000,000	$196,393,745	The 24th animated film from Paramount Pictures, the 31st animated film from Warner Bros. Pictures and the third animated film from ImageMovers.
Enchanted	November 17, 2007 (El Capitan Theatre); November 21, 2007 (official release)	—N/a	Traditional animation/Computer animation/Live-action	Walt Disney Pictures; Sonnenfeld Productions; Josephson Entertainment	Walt Disney Studios Motion Pictures	107	$85,000,000	$340,487,652	The 13th Disney animated film with live-action. Also spawned into a 2022 sequel, Disenchanted.
The Santa Claus Brothers	December 1, 2007	—N/a	Computer animation	Film Roman; Nelvana; Sitting Ducks Productions; YTV	Kidtoon Films	47	—N/a	—N/a	The 12th animated film from Kidtoon Films and the ninth animated film from Nelvana. Originally aired as a television special on Disney Channel in 2001.
Alvin and the Chipmunks	December 14, 2007	—N/a	Computer animation/Live-action	Fox 2000 Pictures; Regency Enterprises; Bagdasarian Company; Dune Entertainment	20th Century Fox	91	$60,000,000	$365,352,546	The seventh Fox animated film with live action and the first animated film from Regency Enterprises.
Persepolis	December 25, 2007	—N/a	Traditional animation	Celluloid Dreams; CNC; France 3 Cinéma; The Kennedy/Marshall Company	Sony Pictures Classics	95	$7,300,000	$22,783,978	The third animated film from Sony Pictures Classics. Nominee of an Academy Award for Best Animated Feature.
The Pirates Who Don't Do Anything: A VeggieTales Movie	January 11, 2008	—N/a	Computer animation	Big Idea Entertainment; Starz Animation	Universal Pictures	85	$15,000,000	$13,247,725	A sequel to Jonah: A VeggieTales Movie, the 10th animated film from Universal Pictures and the second animated film from Big Idea.
One Piece Movie: The Desert Princess and the Pirates: Adventures in Alabasta	February 7, 2008	—N/a	Anime	Toei Animation; Fuji TV; Shueisha; Bandai Visual	The Bigger Picture	90	—N/a	$7,090,891	The first animated film from The Bigger Picture.
Vexille	February 14, 2008	—N/a	Computer animation	Oxybot	The Bigger Picture	111	$10,000,000	$1,170,351	The second animated film from The Bigger Picture.
Chicago 10: Speak Your Peace	February 29, 2008	—N/a	Rotoscoping/Live action	Consolidated Documentaries; Participant; River Road Entertainment; Curious Pictures	Roadside Attractions	110	—N/a	$177,490	The first animated film from Roadside Attractions.
Easter in Bunnyland	March 1, 2008	—N/a	Traditional animation	Burbank Animation Studios	Kidtoon Films	50	—N/a	—N/a	The 12th animated film from Kidtoon Films. Originally finished in 2000.
Horton Hears a Who!	March 8, 2008 (Westwood Village Theatre); March 14, 2008 (official release)	—N/a	Computer animation	20th Century Fox Animation; Blue Sky Studios	20th Century Fox	86	$85,000,000	$298,572,799	The 16th animated film from 20th Century Fox, the seventh animated film from 20th Century Fox Animation, the fourth animated film from Blue Sky Studios and the first animated film to be based on the works of Dr. Seuss.
Kung Fu Panda	May 15, 2008 (2008 Cannes Film Festival); June 6, 2008 (official release)	—N/a	Computer animation	DreamWorks Animation	Paramount Pictures	92	$130,000,000	$631,744,560	The 25th animated film from Paramount Pictures, the 16th animated film from DreamWorks Animation and the first kung fu-themed animated film. Nominee of an Academy Award for Best Animated Feature and a Golden Globe Award for Best Animated Feature Film.
WALL-E	June 21, 2008 (Greek Theatre); June 27, 2008 (official release)	Presto	Computer animation	Walt Disney Pictures; Pixar Animation Studios	Walt Disney Studios Motion Pictures	98	$180,000,000	$521,311,860	The ninth animated film from Pixar Animation Studios. Winner of an Academy Award for Best Animated Feature and a Golden Globe Award for Best Animated Feature Film.
Thomas & Friends: The Great Discovery	July 5, 2008	—N/a	Models	HIT Entertainment	Kidtoon Films	61	—N/a	—N/a	The 13th animated film from Kidtoon Films, the first animated film from HIT Entertainment and the first animated film to feature Thomas the Tank Engine.
Space Chimps	July 12, 2008 (Zanuck Theater); July 18, 2008 (official release)	—N/a	Computer animation	Starz Animation; Vanguard Animation	20th Century Fox	81	$37,000,000	$65,097,693	The 17th animated film from 20th Century Fox and the third animated film from Vanguard Animation. Also spawned into a 2010 sequel, Space Chimps 2: Zartog Strikes Back.
Sword of the Stranger	July 18, 2008	—N/a	Anime	Bones	Shochiku	102	—N/a	$245,220	The first animated film from Shochiku.
Fly Me to the Moon	July 31, 2008 (Regal Union Square Theater); August 15, 2008 (official release)	—N/a	Computer animation	NWave Pictures; Illuminata Pictures	Summit Entertainment	85	—N/a	$25,000,000	The third animated film from NWave Pictures and the first animated film from Summit Entertainment.
Star Wars: The Clone Wars	August 10, 2008 (Grauman's Egyptian Theatre); August 15, 2008 (official release)	—N/a	Computer animation	Lucasfilm; Lucasfilm Animation	Warner Bros. Pictures	98	$8,500,000	$68,282,844	The 32nd animated film from Warner Bros. Pictures, the second animated film from Lucasfilm and the first animated film from Lucasfilm Animation. A pilot episode of the TV series of the same name.
Tinker Bell	September 19, 2008 (El Capitan Theatre); October 28, 2008 (official release, direct-to-video)	—N/a	Computer animation	Walt Disney Pictures; Disneytoon Studios	Walt Disney Studios Motion Pictures	78	$50,000,000	$9,199,510	The eighth animated film from DisneyToon Studios and the first film in the Disney Fairies franchise.
Igor	September 13, 2008 (Grauman's Chinese Theatre); September 19, 2008 (official release)	—N/a	Computer animation	The Weinstein Company; Exodus Film Group; Sparx Animation Studios	Metro-Goldwyn-Mayer	86	$25,000,000	$30,893,885	The seventh animated film from Metro-Goldwyn-Mayer and the fourth animated film from The Weinstein Company.
Azur & Asmar	October 17, 2008	—N/a	Computer animation	Mac Guff	GKIDS; The Weinstein Company	99	$10,906,416	$11,939,023	The fifth animated film from The Weinstein Company and the first animated film from GKIDS.
Fear(s) of the Dark	October 22, 2008	—N/a	Computer animation	Diaphana Films	IFC Films	79	—N/a	$450,813	The first animated film from IFC Films.
Roadside Romeo	October 24, 2008	—N/a	Computer animation	Walt Disney Pictures India; Yash Raj Films	Walt Disney Studios Motion Pictures	93	—N/a	$1,978,021	The first Disney animated film from India.
Madagascar: Escape 2 Africa	October 26, 2008 (Westwood Village Theatre); November 7, 2008 (official release)	—N/a	Computer animation	DreamWorks Animation; PDI/DreamWorks	Paramount Pictures	89	$150,000,000	$603,900,354	A sequel to Madagascar, the 26th animated film from Paramount Pictures and the 17th animated film from DreamWorks Animation.
Bolt	November 17, 2008 (El Capitan Theatre); November 21, 2008 (official release)	Tokyo Mater	Computer animation	Walt Disney Pictures; Walt Disney Animation Studios	Walt Disney Studios Motion Pictures	96	$150,000,000	$309,979,994	The 48th animated film from Walt Disney Animation Studios.
Delgo	December 12, 2008	—N/a	Computer animation	Electric Eye Entertainment Corporation; Fathom Studios	Freestyle Releasing	89	$40,000,000	$694,782	The first animated film from Freestyle Releasing and the first animated film from Fathom Studios.
Dragon Hunters	December 12, 2008	—N/a	Computer animation	LuxAnimation; Trixter; Mac Guff	Futurikon	82	$14,541,888	$12,389,088	The first animated film from Futurikon.
$9.99	December 12, 2008	—N/a	Stop-motion	Regent Releasing		78	—N/a	$708,354	The first animated film from Regent Releasing.
The Sky Crawlers	December 12, 2008	—N/a	Anime	Nippon TV; Production I.G; Polygon Pictures	Sony Pictures Releasing	121	$3,000,000	$5,845,516	The second animated film from Sony Pictures Releasing.
The Tale of Despereaux	December 7, 2008 (Arclight Theatre); December 19, 2008 (official release)	—N/a	Computer animation	Relativity Media; Larger Than Life Productions; Framestore	Universal Pictures	93	$60,000,000	$86,957,280	The 11th animated film from Universal Pictures and the second animated film from Relativity Media.
Waltz with Bashir	December 25, 2008	—N/a	Flash animation/Traditional animation	Bridgit Folman Film Gang; Les Films d'Ici; Razor Film Produktion	Sony Pictures Classics	90	$2,000,000	$11,179,372	The fourth animated film from Sony Pictures Classics.
Coraline	February 5, 2009 (Arlene Schnitzer Hall); February 6, 2009 (official release)	—N/a	Stop-motion	Laika	Focus Features	100	$60,000,000	$124,596,837	The first animated film from Focus Features and the second animated film from Laika. Nominee of an Academy Award for Best Animated Feature and a Golden Globe Award for Best Animated Feature Film.
Monsters vs. Aliens	March 22, 2009 (Gibson Amphitheatre); March 27, 2009 (official release)	—N/a	Computer animation	DreamWorks Animation	Paramount Pictures	94	$175,000,000	$381,509,870	The 27th animated film from Paramount Pictures, the 18th animated film from DreamWorks Animation and the first animated film to be directly produced in stereoscopic 3D.
Battle for Terra	May 1, 2009	—N/a	Computer animation	Roadside Attractions; Snoot Entertainment	Lionsgate	79	$4,000,000	$6,129,640	The fourth animated film from Lionsgate and the second animated film from Roadside Attractions.
Up	May 16, 2009 (El Capitan Theatre); May 29, 2009 (official release)	Partly Cloudy	Computer animation	Walt Disney Pictures; Pixar Animation Studios	Walt Disney Studios Motion Pictures	96	$175,000,000	$735,099,082	The 10th animated film from Pixar Animation Studios. Entered into the 2009 Cannes Film Festival, winner of an Academy Award for Best Animated Feature and a Golden Globe Award for Best Animated Feature Film, and nominee of an Academy Award for Best Picture.
Ice Age: Dawn of the Dinosaurs	July 1, 2009	—N/a	Computer animation	20th Century Fox Animation; Blue Sky Studios	20th Century Fox	94	$90,000,000	$886,686,817	A sequel to Ice Age and Ice Age: The Meltdown, the 18th animated film from 20th Century Fox, the eighth animated film from 20th Century Fox Animation and the fifth animated film from Blue Sky Studios.
Evangelion: 1.0 You Are (Not) Alone	July 3, 2009	—N/a	Anime	Studio Khara	Eleven Arts	98	—N/a	$16,283,819	The first animated film from Eleven Arts.
Aliens in the Attic	July 31, 2009	—N/a	Computer animation/Live-action	Regency Enterprises; Josephson Entertainment; Dune Entertainment	20th Century Fox	86	$45,000,000	$57,881,056	The eighth Fox animated film with live-action and the second animated film from Regency Enterprises.
Ponyo	June 28, 2009 (LA Film Festival); August 14, 2009 (official release)	—N/a	Anime	Studio Ghibli	GKIDS	102	$34,000,000	$204,171,810	The second animated film from GKIDS and the eighth Studio Ghibli film to be theatrically released in the United States.
Thomas & Friends: Hero of the Rails	September 5, 2009	—N/a	Computer animation	HIT Entertainment; Nitrogen Studios	Kidtoon Films	60	—N/a	$137,630	A sequel to Thomas & Friends: The Great Discovery, the 14th animated film from Kidtoon Films and the second animated film from HIT Entertainment.
9	September 9, 2009	—N/a	Computer animation	Relativity Media; LuxAnimation	Focus Features	80	$30,000,000	$48,428,063	The second animated film from Focus Features and the third animated film from Relativity Media.
Cloudy with a Chance of Meatballs	September 12, 2009 (Westwood Village Theatre); September 18, 2009 (official release)	—N/a	Computer animation	Columbia Pictures; Sony Pictures Animation	Sony Pictures Releasing	90	$100,000,000	$243,006,126	The 15th animated film from Columbia Pictures and the third animated film from Sony Pictures Animation. Nominee of a Golden Globe Award for Best Animated Feature Film
Mary and Max	September 25, 2009	—N/a	Stop-motion	Melodrama Pictures	Icon Productions	92	$8,200,000	$1,740,429	The first animated film from Icon Productions.
Tinker Bell and the Lost Treasure	October 16, 2009 (El Capitan Theatre); October 27, 2009 (official release, direct-to-video)	—N/a	Computer animation	Walt Disney Pictures; Disneytoon Studios	Walt Disney Studios Motion Pictures	80	$30,000,000	$5,816,532	A sequel to Tinker Bell and the ninth animated film from DisneyToon Studios.
Astro Boy	October 18, 2009 (Grauman's Chinese Theatre); October 23, 2009 (official release)	—N/a	Computer animation	Imagi Animation Studios	Summit Entertainment	94	$65,000,000	$39,886,986	The second animated film from Summit Entertainment and the second animated film from Imagi Animation Studios.
The Missing Lynx	October 30, 2009	—N/a	Computer animation	Kandor Graphics	Phase 4 Films	101	$6,500,000	$4,201,862	The first animated film from Phase 4 Films.
A Christmas Carol	November 6, 2009	—N/a	Computer animation	Walt Disney Pictures; ImageMovers Digital	Walt Disney Studios Motion Pictures	96	$175,000,000	$325,286,646	The first animated film from ImageMovers Digital.
My Little Pony: Twinkle Wish Adventure	November 7, 2009	—N/a	Traditional animation	SD Entertainment; Hasbro	Kidtoon Films	44	—N/a	—N/a	The 26th animated film from Kidtoon Films and the 10th animated film from SD Entertainment.
Fantastic Mr. Fox	October 30, 2009 (AFI Fest); November 13, 2009 (official release)	—N/a	Stop-motion	American Empirical Pictures; Indian Paintbrush; Regency Enterprises	20th Century Fox	87	$40,000,000	$46,471,023	The first animated film from Wes Anderson, the 19th animated film from 20th Century Fox and the third animated film from Regency Enterprises. Nominee of an Academy Award for Best Animated Feature and a Golden Globe Award for Best Animated Feature Film.
Planet 51	November 14, 2009 (Westwood Village Theatre); November 20, 2009 (official release)	—N/a	Computer animation	TriStar Pictures; Ilion Animation Studios; HandMade Films	Sony Pictures Releasing	91	$70,000,000	$105,647,102	The fourth animated film from TriStar Pictures and the first animated film from Ilion Animation Studios.
The Princess and the Frog	November 15, 2009 (Walt Disney Studios); December 11, 2009 (official release)	—N/a	Traditional animation	Walt Disney Pictures; Walt Disney Animation Studios	Walt Disney Studios Motion Pictures	97	$105,000,000	$267,045,765	The 49th animated film from Walt Disney Animation Studios and the ninth Disney Princess. Nominee of an Academy Award for Best Animated Feature and a Golden Globe Award for Best Animated Feature Film.
A Town Called Panic	December 16, 2009	—N/a	Stop motion	La Parti Productions; Coproduction Office	Zeitgeist Films	76		$505,699	The first animated film from Zeitgeist Films.
Alvin and the Chipmunks: The Squeakquel	December 23, 2009	—N/a	Computer animation/Live-action	Fox 2000 Pictures; Regency Enterprises; Bagdasarian Company; Dune Entertainment	20th Century Fox	88	$70,000,000	$443,140,005	A sequel to Alvin and the Chipmunks, the ninth Fox animated film with live-action and the fourth animated film from Regency Enterprises.
Sita Sings the Blues	December 25, 2009	—N/a	Traditional animation	GKIDS		81	$290,000	$12,619	The third animated film from GKIDS and the second animated film to be put in the public domain.
The Secret of Kells	March 5, 2010	—N/a	Traditional animation	Les Armateurs; Vivi Film; Cartoon Saloon; France 2 Cinéma	GKIDS	75	$8,000,000	$1,803,412	The fourth animated film from GKIDS and the first animated film from Cartoon Saloon. Nominee of an Academy Award for Best Animated Feature.
How to Train Your Dragon	March 21, 2010 (Gibson Amphitheatre); March 26, 2010 (official release)	—N/a	Computer animation	DreamWorks Animation	Paramount Pictures	98	$165,000,000	$494,878,759	The 28th animated film from Paramount Pictures and the 19th animated film from DreamWorks Animation. Nominee of an Academy Award for Best Animated Feature and a Golden Globe Award for Best Animated Feature Film. Also adapted into a 2025 live-action remake.
Terkel in Trouble	March 26, 2010	—N/a	Computer animation	A Film. A/S; TV 2 Denmark; Danish Film Institute	Indican Pictures	84	$1,600,000	$306,003	The third animated film from Indican Pictures.
Care Bears: To the Rescue	April 3, 2010	—N/a	Computer animation	SD Entertainment; American Greetings	Kidtoon Films	65	—N/a	—N/a	A sequel to Care Bears: Oopsy Does It!, the 15th animated film from Kidtoon Films and the 11th animated film from SD Entertainment.
2012: Time for Change	April 9, 2010	—N/a	Flash animation/Live action	Mangusta Productions		85	—N/a	$68,339	The first animated film from Mangusta Productions.
Metropia	May 12, 2010	—N/a	Computer animation	Atmo Media Network	Tribeca Film	86	$34,000,000	$81,305	The first animated film from Tribeca Film.
Shrek Forever After	April 21, 2010 (Tribeca Film Festival); May 21, 2010 (official release)	—N/a	Computer animation	DreamWorks Animation	Paramount Pictures	93	$135,000,000	$752,600,867	A sequel to Shrek, Shrek 2 and Shrek the Third, the 29th animated film from Paramount Pictures and the 20th animated film from DreamWorks Animation.
Toy Story 3	June 13, 2010 (El Capitan Theatre); June 18, 2010 (official release)	Day & Night	Computer animation	Walt Disney Pictures; Pixar Animation Studios	Walt Disney Studios Motion Pictures	102	$200,000,000	$1,066,969,703	A sequel to Toy Story and Toy Story 2, the 11th animated film from Pixar Animation Studios and the first animated film to be presented in Dolby Surround 7.1. Winner of an Academy Award for Best Animated Feature and a Golden Globe Award for Best Animated Feature Film, and nominee of an Academy Award for Best Picture.
Despicable Me	June 27, 2010 (LA Film Festival); July 9, 2010 (official release)	—N/a	Computer animation	Illumination Entertainment	Universal Pictures	94	$69,000,000	$543,113,985	The 12th animated film from Universal Pictures and the first animated film from Illumination Entertainment. Nominee of a Golden Globe Award for Best Animated Feature Film.
Tales from Earthsea	August 13, 2010	—N/a	Anime	Studio Ghibli	GKIDS	115	$22,000,000	$48,658	The fifth animated film from GKIDS and the ninth animated Studio Ghibli film to be theatrically released in the United States.
My Dog Tulip	September 1, 2010	—N/a	Traditional animation	Norman Twain Productions	New Yorker Films	83	—N/a	$246,574	The first animated film from New Yorker Films.
Tinker Bell and the Great Fairy Rescue	September 3, 2010 (El Capitan Theatre); September 21, 2010 (official release, direct-to-video)	—N/a	Computer animation	Walt Disney Pictures; Disneytoon Studios	Walt Disney Studios Motion Pictures	76	$30,000,000	$10,872,752	A sequel to Tinker Bell and Tinker Bell and the Lost Treasure, and the 10th animated film from DisneyToon Studios.
Alpha and Omega	September 8, 2010 (TIFF); September 17, 2010 (official release)	—N/a	Computer animation	Crest Animation Productions	Lionsgate	88	$20,000,000	$50,507,267	The fifth animated film from Lionsgate and the seventh animated film from Crest Animation Productions. Also spawned into a franchise of direct-to-video sequels.
Legend of the Guardians: The Owls of Ga'Hoole	September 19, 2010 (Grauman's Chinese Theatre); September 24, 2010 (official release)	Fur of Flying	Computer animation	Village Roadshow Pictures; Animal Logic; Cruel and Unusual Films; GOG Productions	Warner Bros. Pictures	97	$80,000,000	$140,073,390	The 33rd animated film from Warner Bros. Pictures, the second animated film from Village Roadshow Pictures and the second animated film from Animal Logic.
Idiots and Angels	October 6, 2010	—N/a	Traditional animation	Plymptoons	E.D. Distribution	78	—N/a	$94,434	The fifth animated film from Bill Plympton and the first animated film from E.D. Distribution.
Megamind	November 3, 2010 (AMC Lincoln Square Theatre); November 5, 2010 (official release)	—N/a	Computer animation	DreamWorks Animation; PDI/DreamWorks	Paramount Pictures	95	$130,000,000	$321,885,765	The 30th animated film from Paramount Pictures and the 21st animated film from DreamWorks Animation. Also spawned into a 2024 sequel, Megamind vs. the Doom Syndicate.
Care Bears: Share Bear Shines	November 6, 2010	—N/a	Computer animation	SD Entertainment; American Greetings	Kidtoon Films	66	—N/a	—N/a	A sequel to Care Bears: Oopsy Does It!, Care Bears: To the Rescue and Care Bears: The Giving Festival, the 16th animated film from Kidtoon Films and the 12th animated film from SD Entertainment.
Tangled	November 14, 2010 (El Capitan Theatre); November 24, 2010 (official release)	—N/a	Computer animation	Walt Disney Pictures; Walt Disney Animation Studios	Walt Disney Studios Motion Pictures	100	$260,000,000	$592,461,732	The 50th animated film from Walt Disney Animation Studios and the 10th Disney Princess. Nominee of a Golden Globe Award for Best Animated Feature Film.
The Dreams of Jinsha	December 3, 2010	—N/a	Traditional animation	Shi Long Animation	Abramarama	85	$11,000,000	—N/a	The first animated film from Abramarama.
Yogi Bear	December 11, 2010 (Westwood Village Theatre); December 17, 2010 (official release)	Rabid Rider	Computer animation/Live-action	De Line Pictures; Sunswept Entertainment; Rhythm & Hues Studios	Warner Bros. Pictures	80	$80,000,000	$203,509,374	The eighth Warner Bros. animated film with live-action.
Summer Wars	December 24, 2010	—N/a	Anime	Madhouse	GKIDS	114	—N/a	$18,434,328	The sixth animated film from GKIDS.
The Illusionist	December 25, 2010	—N/a	Traditional animation	Django Films; Allied Filmmakers	Sony Pictures Classics	80	$17,000,000	$41,162,041	The second animated film from Sylvain Chomet and the fifth animated film from Sony Pictures Classics. Nominee of an Academy Award for Best Animated Feature and a Golden Globe Award for Best Animated Feature Film.
Evangelion: 2.0 You Can (Not) Advance	January 21, 2011	—N/a	Anime	Studio Khara	Eleven Arts	108	$43,860,000	$6,007,194	A sequel to Evangelion: 1.0 You Are (Not) Alone and the second animated film from Eleven Arts.
Eleanor's Secret	January 21, 2011	—N/a	Traditional animation	Prana Studios; Tremendous Entertainment	GKIDS	80	—N/a	$2,223,702	The seventh animated film from GKIDS.
Gnomeo & Juliet	January 23, 2011 (El Capitan Theatre); February 11, 2011 (official release)	—N/a	Computer animation	Touchstone Pictures; Rocket Pictures	Walt Disney Studios Motion Pictures	84	$36,000,000	$193,967,670	The second animated film from Touchstone Pictures.
Rango	February 14, 2011 (Westwood Village Theatre); March 4, 2011 (official release)	—N/a	Computer animation	Nickelodeon Movies; Blind Wink Productions; GK Films; Industrial Light & Magic	Paramount Pictures	107	$135,000,000	$245,724,603	The 31st animated film from Paramount Pictures and the ninth animated film from Nickelodeon Movies. Winner of an Academy Award for Best Animated Feature and nominee of a Golden Globe Award for Best Animated Feature Film.
The Little Engine That Could	March 5, 2011	—N/a	Traditional animation	Universal Animation Studios; Crest Animation Productions	Kidtoon Films	82	—N/a	—N/a	The 17th animated film from Kidtoon Films, the second animated film from Universal Animation Studios and the eighth animated film from Crest Animation Productions.
Mars Needs Moms	March 6, 2011 (El Capitan Theatre); March 11, 2011 (official release)	—N/a	Computer animation	Walt Disney Pictures; ImageMovers Digital	Walt Disney Studios Motion Pictures	88	$150,000,000	$39,233,678	The second animated film from ImageMovers Digital.
Mia and the Migoo	March 25, 2011	—N/a	Traditional animation	Folimage	GKIDS	91	$9,400,000	$4,508,254	The eighth animated film from GKIDS.
Hop	March 27, 2011 (Universal Studios Hollywood); April 1, 2011 (official release)	—N/a	Computer animation/Live-action	Illumination Entertainment	Universal Pictures	95	$185,000,000	$183,953,723	The fourth Universal animated film with live-action, the second animated film from Illumination Entertainment and the first animated film to be presented in Datasat Digital Sound.
The Strawberry Shortcake Movie: Sky's the Limit	July 30, 2009 (FOX Studios); April 2, 2011 (official release)	—N/a	Computer animation	American Greetings; MoonScoop Group	Kidtoon Films	69	—N/a	—N/a	The 18th animated film from Kidtoon Films.
American: The Bill Hicks Story	April 8, 2011	—N/a	Flash animation/Live-action	American the Movie	Variance Films	106	—N/a	$92,234	The first animated film from Variance Films.
Rio	April 10, 2011 (Grauman's Chinese Theatre); April 15, 2011 (official release)	—N/a	Computer animation	20th Century Fox Animation; Blue Sky Studios	20th Century Fox	96	$90,000,000	$483,866,518	The 21st animated film from 20th Century Fox, the ninth animated film from 20th Century Fox Animation and the sixth animated film from Blue Sky Studios.
Hoodwinked Too! Hood vs. Evil	April 23, 2011 (Tribeca Film Festival); April 29, 2011 (official release)	—N/a	Computer animation	Kanbar Entertainment; Arc Productions	The Weinstein Company	86	$30,000,000	$29,985,033	A sequel to Hoodwinked! and the sixth animated film from The Weinstein Company.
Kung Fu Panda 2	May 22, 2011 (Ziegfeld Theatre); May 26, 2011 (official release)	—N/a	Computer animation	DreamWorks Animation	Paramount Pictures	90	$150,000,000	$665,692,281	A sequel to Kung Fu Panda, the 32nd animated film from Paramount Pictures and the 22nd animated film from DreamWorks Animation. Nominee of an Academy Award for Best Animated Feature.
The Lion of Judah	June 3, 2011	—N/a	Computer animation	Sunrise Productions	Rocky Mountain Pictures	87	$15,000,000	$15,000,000	The first animated film from Rocky Mountain Pictures.
Cars 2	June 18, 2011 (El Capitan Theatre); June 24, 2011 (official release)	Hawaiian Vacation	Computer animation	Walt Disney Pictures; Pixar Animation Studios	Walt Disney Studios Motion Pictures	106	$200,000,000	$559,852,396	A sequel to Cars and the 12th animated film from Pixar Animation Studios. Nominee of a Golden Globe Award for Best Animated Feature Film.
Trigun: Badlands Rumble	July 8, 2011	—N/a	Anime	Madhouse	Funimation Entertainment	90	$682,820	$193,458	The first animated film from Funimation Entertainment.
Winnie the Pooh	July 10, 2011 (Walt Disney Studios); July 15, 2011 (official release)	The Ballad of Nessie	Traditional animation	Walt Disney Pictures; Walt Disney Animation Studios	Walt Disney Studios Motion Pictures	63	$30,000,000	$49,871,429	A sequel to The Many Adventures of Winnie the Pooh, The Tigger Movie, Piglet's Big Movie and Pooh's Heffalump Movie, the 51st animated film from Walt Disney Animation Studios and the last Disney traditionally animated film, until years later. Also spawned into a 2018 live-action sequel.
The Smurfs	July 24, 2011 (Ziegfeld Theatre); July 29, 2011 (official release)	—N/a	Computer animation/Live-action	Columbia Pictures; Sony Pictures Animation; Kerner Entertainment Company	Sony Pictures Releasing	102	$110,000,000	$563,749,323	The fourth Columbia animated film with live-action, the fourth animated film from Sony Pictures Animation and the first animated film from the Kerner Entertainment Company.
The Greatest Miracle	October 14, 2011	—N/a	Computer animation	Dos Corazones Films	KKM	69	—N/a	$3,247,466	The first animated film from KKM.
Puss in Boots	October 23, 2011 (Regency Village Theatre); October 28, 2011 (official release)	—N/a	Computer animation	DreamWorks Animation	Paramount Pictures	90	$130,000,000	$554,987,477	A prequel to Shrek, the 33rd animated film from Paramount Pictures and the 23rd animated film from DreamWorks Animation. Nominee of an Academy Award for Best Animated Feature and a Golden Globe Award for Best Animated Feature Film.
Thomas & Friends: Day of the Diesels	November 5, 2011	—N/a	Computer animation	HIT Entertainment; Nitrogen Studios	Kidtoon Films	60	—N/a	$220,509	A sequel to Thomas & Friends: The Great Discovery, Thomas & Friends: Hero of the Rails and Thomas & Friends: Misty Island Rescue, the 19th animated film from Kidtoon Films and the third animated film from HIT Entertainment.
Happy Feet Two	November 13, 2011 (Grauman's Chinese Theatre); November 18, 2011 (official release)	I Tawt I Taw a Puddy Tat	Computer animation	Village Roadshow Pictures; Animal Logic; Kennedy Miller Productions; Dr. D Studios	Warner Bros. Pictures	99	$135,000,000	$159,196,259	A sequel to Happy Feet, the 34th animated film from Warner Bros. Pictures, the third animated film from Village Roadshow Pictures and the third animated film from Animal Logic.
Arthur Christmas	November 13, 2011 (Ziegfeld Theatre); November 23, 2011 (official release)	Santa Claus Is Comin' to Town by Justin Bieber	Computer animation	Columbia Pictures; Sony Pictures Animation; Aardman Animations	Sony Pictures Releasing	97	$100,000,000	$147,421,719	The 16th animated film from Columbia Pictures, the fifth animated film from Sony Pictures Animation and the fourth animated film from Aardman. Nominee of a Golden Globe Award for Best Animated Feature Film.
Redline	December 2, 2011	—N/a	Rotoscoping	Madhouse	Manga Entertainment	102	$30,000,000	$214,180	The fourth animated film from Manga Entertainment.
Pokémon the Movie: Black—Victini and Reshiram and White—Victini and Zekrom	December 3, 2011	—N/a	Anime	OLM; Production I.G; Xebec	Cinedigm	191	—N/a	$57,082,491	The first Pokémon animated film to be theatrically released in the United States since 2003's Pokémon Heroes.
Wrinkles	December 9, 2011	—N/a	Traditional animation	Perro Verde Films		89	$175,846,084	$191,974	The first animated film from Perro Verde Films.
Alvin and the Chipmunks: Chipwrecked	December 8, 2011 (AMC Empire 25); December 16, 2011 (official release)	Scrat's Continental Crack-up: Part 2	Computer animation/Live-action	Fox 2000 Pictures; Regency Enterprises; Bagdasarian Company; Dune Entertainment	20th Century Fox	87	$80,000,000	$342,695,435	A sequel to Alvin and the Chipmunks and Alvin and the Chipmunks: The Squeakquel, the 10th Fox animated film with live-action and the fifth animated film from Regency Enterprises.
The Adventures of Tintin	December 11, 2011 (Ziegfeld Theatre); December 21, 2011 (official release)	—N/a	Computer animation	Columbia Pictures; Nickelodeon Movies; Amblin Entertainment	Paramount Pictures	107	$135,000,000	$373,993,951	The 34th animated film from Paramount Pictures, the 17th animated film from Columbia Pictures, the 10th animated film from Nickelodeon Movies and the 10th animated film from Amblin Entertainment. Winner of a Golden Globe Award for Best Animated Feature Film.
Fullmetal Alchemist: The Sacred Star of Milos	January 20, 2012	—N/a	Anime	Bones	Funimation Entertainment	111	—N/a	$7,621,364	The second animated film from Funimation Entertainment.
Chico and Rita	February 10, 2012	—N/a	Traditional animation	Fernando Trueba PC; Estudio Mariscal; Magic Light Pictures	GKIDS	93	$12,118,240	$2,347,919	The ninth animated film from GKIDS. Nominee of an Academy Award for Best Animated Feature.
The Secret World of Arrietty	February 17, 2012	—N/a	Anime	Studio Ghibli	GKIDS	94	$23,000,000	$149,411,550	The 10th animated film from GKIDS and the 10th animated Studio Ghibli film to be theatrically released in the United States.
The Lorax	February 19, 2012 (Universal CityWalk); March 2, 2012 (official release)	—N/a	Computer animation	Illumination Entertainment; Dentsu	Universal Pictures	86	$70,000,000	$348,840,316	The 13th animated film from Universal Pictures and the third animated film from Illumination Entertainment.
The Pirates! Band of Misfits	April 22, 2012 (AMC Empire); April 27, 2012 (official release)	—N/a	Stop-motion	Columbia Pictures; Sony Pictures Animation; Aardman Animations	Sony Pictures Releasing	88	$55,000,000	$123,054,041	The 18th animated film from Columbia Pictures, the sixth animated film from Sony Pictures Animation and the fifth animated film from Aardman. Nominee of an Academy Award for Best Animated Feature.
Space Dogs	May 18, 2012	—N/a	Computer animation	Centre of National Film	Epic Pictures Group	88	$4,847,296	$8,553,835	The first animated film from Epic Pictures Group. Also spawned into two sequels, Space Dogs: Adventure to the Moon and Space Dogs: Return to Earth.
Arjun: The Warrior Prince	May 25, 2012 (official release); September 1, 2012 (El Capitan Theatre)	—N/a	Computer animation	Walt Disney Pictures India; UTV Motion Pictures	Walt Disney Studios Motion Pictures	96	—N/a	$10,017	The second Disney animated film from India.
A Cat in Paris	June 1, 2012	—N/a	Traditional animation	Digit Anima; Folimage; France 3 Cinéma; Emage Animation Studios	GKIDS	64	$7,500,000	$2,080,634	The 11th animated film from GKIDS. Nominee of an Academy Award for Best Animated Feature.
Madagascar 3: Europe's Most Wanted	May 18, 2012 (2012 Cannes Film Festival); June 8, 2012 (official release)	—N/a	Computer animation	DreamWorks Animation; PDI/DreamWorks	Paramount Pictures	93	$145,000,000	$746,921,274	A sequel to Madagascar and Madagascar: Escape 2 Africa, the 35th animated film from Paramount Pictures and the 24th animated film from DreamWorks Animation.
Brave	June 18, 2012 (Dolby Theatre); June 22, 2012 (official release)	La Luna	Computer animation	Walt Disney Pictures; Pixar Animation Studios	Walt Disney Studios Motion Pictures	93	$185,000,000	$538,983,207	The 13th animated film from Pixar Animation Studios, the 11th Disney Princess and the first animated film to be presented in Dolby Atmos. Winner of an Academy Award for Best Animated Feature and a Golden Globe Award for Best Animated Feature Film.
Ice Age: Continental Drift	June 20, 2012 (CineEurope); July 13, 2012 (official release)	The Longest Daycare	Computer animation	20th Century Fox Animation; Blue Sky Studios	20th Century Fox	88	$95,000,000	$877,244,782	A sequel to Ice Age, Ice Age: The Meltdown and Ice Age: Dawn of the Dinosaurs, the 22nd animated film from 20th Century Fox, the 10th animated film from 20th Century Fox Animation and the seventh animated film from Blue Sky Studios.
Thomas & Friends: Blue Mountain Mystery	August 4, 2012	—N/a	Computer animation	HIT Entertainment; Nitrogen Studios	Kidtoon Films	64	—N/a	—N/a	A sequel to Thomas & Friends: The Great Discovery, Thomas & Friends: Hero of the Rails, Thomas & Friends: Misty Island Rescue and Thomas & Friends: Day of the Diesels, the 20th animated film from Kidtoon Films and the fourth animated film from HIT Entertainment.
ParaNorman	August 5, 2012 (Universal CityWalk); August 17, 2012 (official release)	—N/a	Stop-motion	Laika	Focus Features	92	$60,000,000	$107,139,399	The third animated film from Focus Features and the third animated film from Laika. Nominee of an Academy Award for Best Animated Feature.
Secret of the Wings	August 31, 2012 (El Capitan Theatre); October 23, 2012 (official release, direct-to-video)	—N/a	Computer animation	Walt Disney Pictures; Disneytoon Studios	Walt Disney Studios Motion Pictures	75	$30,000,000	$627,018	A sequel to Tinker Bell, Tinker Bell and the Lost Treasure and Tinker Bell and the Great Fairy Rescue, and the 11th animated film from DisneyToon Studios.
Toys in the Attic	September 7, 2012	—N/a	Stop motion	CinemArt		78	—N/a	$64,918	The first animated film from CinemArt.
Tales of the Night	September 26, 2012	—N/a	Silhouette animation	StudioCanal; Nord-Ouest Films; Studio O	GKIDS	84	—N/a	$10,975	The 12th animated film from GKIDS and the first animated film from StudioCanal.
Hotel Transylvania	September 8, 2012 (TIFF); September 28, 2012 (official release)	—N/a	Computer animation	Columbia Pictures; Sony Pictures Animation	Sony Pictures Releasing	91	$85,000,000	$358,375,603	The 19th animated film from Columbia Pictures and the seventh animated film from Sony Pictures Animation. Nominee of a Golden Globe Award for Best Animated Feature Film.
Frankenweenie	September 24, 2012 (El Capitan Theatre); October 5, 2012 (official release)	—N/a	Stop-motion	Walt Disney Pictures; Tim Burton Productions	Walt Disney Studios Motion Pictures	87	$39,000,000	$81,491,068	The fourth animated film from Tim Burton. Nominee of an Academy Award for Best Animated Feature and a Golden Globe Award for Best Animated Feature Film.
Puella Magi Madoka Magica the Movie: Beginnings	October 19, 2012	—N/a	Anime	Shaft	Eleven Arts	130	—N/a	$5,816,330	The third animated film from Eleven Arts.
Puella Magi Madoka Magica the Movie: Eternal	October 19, 2012	—N/a	Anime	Shaft	Eleven Arts	110	—N/a	$5,816,330	The fourth animated film from Eleven Arts.
Wreck-It Ralph	October 29, 2012 (El Capitan Theatre); November 2, 2012 (official release)	Paperman	Computer animation	Walt Disney Pictures; Walt Disney Animation Studios	Walt Disney Studios Motion Pictures	101	$165,000,000	$471,222,889	The 52nd animated film from Walt Disney Animation Studios. Nominee of an Academy Award for Best Animated Feature and a Golden Globe Award for Best Animated Feature Film.
A Liar's Autobiography: The Untrue Story of Monty Python's Graham Chapman	November 2, 2012	—N/a	Various animation styles	Bill and Ben Productions	Brainstorm Media	85	—N/a	$63,469	The first animated film from Brainstorm Media.
Rise of the Guardians	November 4, 2012 (AFI Fest); November 21, 2012 (official release)	—N/a	Computer animation	DreamWorks Animation	Paramount Pictures	97	$145,000,000	$306,941,670	The 36th animated film from Paramount Pictures and the 25th animated film from DreamWorks Animation. Nominee of a Golden Globe Award for Best Animated Feature Film.
The Rabbi's Cat	December 7, 2012	—N/a	Traditional animation	Autochenille Productions	GKIDS	90	$15,147,800	$4,208,573	The 13th animated film from GKIDS.
Delhi Safari	December 7, 2012	—N/a	Computer animation	Applied Art Productions		93	—N/a	$3,495,597	The first animated film from Applied Art Productions.
Consuming Spirits	December 12, 2012	—N/a	Traditional animation/Stop motion	Chris Sullivan		136	—N/a	—N/a	The first animated film from Chris Sullivan.
Escape from Planet Earth	February 2, 2013 (Grauman's Chinese Theatre); February 15, 2013 (official release)	—N/a	Computer animation	Rainmaker Entertainment; Kaleidoscope-TWC; GRF Productions; Blue Yonder Films	The Weinstein Company	89	$40 million	$74,939,189	The seventh animated film from The Weinstein Company.
From Up on Poppy Hill	March 15, 2013	—N/a	Anime	Studio Ghibli	GKIDS	91	$22,000,000	$61,487,846	The 14th animated film from GKIDS and the 11th animated Studio Ghibli film to be theatrically released in the United States.
The Croods	March 10, 2013 (AMC Lincoln Square Theatre); March 22, 2013 (official release)	—N/a	Computer animation	DreamWorks Animation	20th Century Fox	98	$135 million	$573,068,425	The 23rd animated film from 20th Century Fox and the 26th animated film from DreamWorks Animation. Nominee of an Academy Award for Best Animated Feature and a Golden Globe Award for Best Animated Feature Film.
Silver Circle	March 22, 2013	—N/a	Computer animation	Lineplot Productions	Area 23a	90	$1,600,000	$4,080	The first animated film from Area 23a.
An Oversimplification of Her Beauty	April 26, 2013	—N/a	Traditional animation/Live-action	Variance Films		84	—N/a	$71,906	The first animated film from Variance Films.
The Painting	May 10, 2013	—N/a	Computer animation	Blue-Spirit; Be-Films	GKIDS	79	$4,847,296	$22,313	The 15th animated film from GKIDS.
Epic	May 18, 2013 (Ziegfeld Theatre); May 24, 2013 (official release)	—N/a	Computer animation	20th Century Fox Animation; Blue Sky Studios	20th Century Fox	102	$93,000,000	$268,426,634	The 24th animated film from 20th Century Fox, the 11th animated film from 20th Century Fox Animation and the eighth animated film from Blue Sky Studios.
My Little Pony: Equestria Girls	June 15, 2013 (LA Film Festival); June 16, 2013 (official release)	—N/a	Flash animation	DHX Media; Hasbro Studios	Screenvision	73	—N/a	$485,232	The first animated film from Screenvision and the first animated film to be based on My Little Pony: Friendship is Magic.
Monsters University	June 18, 2013 (El Capitan Theatre); June 21, 2013 (official release)	The Blue Umbrella	Computer animation	Walt Disney Pictures; Pixar Animation Studios	Walt Disney Studios Motion Pictures	104	$200,000,000	$743,559,607	A prequel to Monsters, Inc. and the 14th animated film from Pixar Animation Studios.
Despicable Me 2	June 22, 2013 (Universal CityWalk); July 3, 2013 (official release)	—N/a	Computer animation	Illumination Entertainment	Universal Pictures	98	$76,000,000	$970,766,005	A sequel to Despicable Me, the 14th animated film from Universal Pictures and the fourth animated film from Illumination Entertainment. Nominee of an Academy Award for Best Animated Feature and a Golden Globe Award for Best Animated Feature Film.
Turbo	June 24, 2013 (CineEurope); July 17, 2013 (official release)	—N/a	Computer animation	DreamWorks Animation	20th Century Fox	96	$127,000,000	$282,570,682	The 25th animated film from 20th Century Fox and the 27th animated film from DreamWorks Animation.
The Smurfs 2	July 28, 2013 (Regency Village Theatre); July 31, 2013 (official release)	—N/a	Computer animation/Live-action	Columbia Pictures; Sony Pictures Animation; Kerner Entertainment Company	Sony Pictures Releasing	105	$105,000,000	$347,545,360	A sequel to The Smurfs, the fifth Columbia animated film with live-action, the eighth animated film from Sony Pictures Animation and the second animated film from the Kerner Entertainment Company.
Planes	August 2, 2013 (EAA AirVenture Oshkosh); August 9, 2013 (official release)	—N/a	Computer animation	Walt Disney Pictures; Disneytoon Studios	Walt Disney Studios Motion Pictures	92	$50,000,000	$239,258,712	A spin-off of Cars and the 12th animated film from DisneyToon Studios.
Blue Exorcist: The Movie	August 17, 2013	—N/a	Anime	A-1 Pictures	Eleven Arts	90	—N/a	$5,994,921	The fifth animated film from Eleven Arts.
Last Flight of the Champion	August 30, 2013	—N/a	Computer animation	Omnipulse Entertainment	High Top Releasing	88	—N/a	$2,597	The first animated film from High Top Releasing.
Cloudy with a Chance of Meatballs 2	September 21, 2013 (Regency Village Theatre); September 27, 2013 (official release)	—N/a	Computer animation	Columbia Pictures; Sony Pictures Animation	Sony Pictures Releasing	95	$78,000,000	$274,325,949	A sequel to Cloudy with a Chance of Meatballs, the 20th animated film from Columbia Pictures and the ninth animated film from Sony Pictures Animation.
Wolf Children	September 27, 2013	—N/a	Anime	Studio Chizu	GKIDS	117	—N/a	$55,045,228	The 16th animated film from GKIDS.
Free Birds	October 13, 2013 (Westwood Village Theatre); November 1, 2013 (official release)	—N/a	Computer animation	Reel FX Animation Studios	Relativity Media	91	$55,000,000	$110,387,072	The fourth animated film from Relativity Media and the first animated film from Reel FX Animation Studios.
The Legend of Sarila	November 1, 2013	—N/a	Computer animation	10th Ave Productions; CarpeDiem Film & TV	Alliance Vivafilm	81	$8,500,000	$901,596	The first animated film from Alliance Vivafilm.
Approved for Adoption	November 8, 2013	—N/a	Traditional animation/Live action	Cinéart		74	—N/a	$89,801	The first animated film from Cinéart.
Is the Man Who Is Tall Happy?	November 22, 2013	—N/a	Traditional animation/Live action	Partizan	IFC Films	89	—N/a	$137,042	The second animated film from IFC Films.
Frozen	November 19, 2013 (El Capitan Theatre); November 27, 2013 (official release)	Get a Horse!	Computer animation	Walt Disney Pictures; Walt Disney Animation Studios	Walt Disney Studios Motion Pictures	102	$150,000,000	$1,280,802,282	The 53rd animated film from Walt Disney Animation Studios. Winner of an Academy Award for Best Animated Feature and a Golden Globe Award for Best Animated Feature Film.
Puella Magi Madoka Magica the Movie: Rebellion	December 3, 2013	—N/a	Anime	Shaft	Eleven Arts	116	—N/a	$19,582,747	The sixth animated film from Eleven Arts.
Khumba	December 6, 2013	—N/a	Computer animation	Triggerfish Animation Studios	Millennium Entertainment	85	$20,000,000	$27,187,375	The first animated film from Millennium Entertainment and the first animated film from Triggerfish Animation Studios.
Walking with Dinosaurs	December 16, 2013 (Cinema 1, 2, 3); December 20, 2013 (official release)	—N/a	Computer animation/Live-action	Reliance Entertainment; IM Global; BBC Earth; Evergreen Films; Animal Logic	20th Century Fox	87	$80,000,000	$126,546,518	The 26th animated film from 20th Century Fox, the first animated film from BBC Earth and the fourth animated film from Animal Logic.
Rio 2096: A Story of Love and Fury	December 22, 2013	—N/a	Traditional animation	Buriti Filmes Gullane	Europa Filmes	75	$4,000,000	$145,613	The first animated film from Europa Filmes.
Evangelion: 3.0 You Can (Not) Redo	January 10, 2014	—N/a	Anime	Studio Khara	Eleven Arts	96	—N/a	$60,648,662	A sequel to Evangelion: 1.0 You Are (Not) Alone and Evangelion: 2.0 You Can (Not) Advance, and the seventh animated film from Eleven Arts.
The Nut Job	January 11, 2014 (Regal Cinemas); January 17, 2014 (official release)	—N/a	Computer animation	Red Rover International; ToonBox Entertainment; Gulfstream Pictures	Open Road Films	86	$43,000,000	$120,885,527	The first animated film from Open Road Films.
Anohana: The Flower We Saw That Day	January 18, 2014	—N/a	Anime	A-1 Pictures	Eleven Arts	99	—N/a	$10,219,593	The eighth animated film from Eleven Arts.
The Lego Movie	February 1, 2014 (Regency Village Theatre); February 7, 2014 (official release)	—N/a	Computer animation/Live-action	Warner Animation Group; Village Roadshow Pictures; Vertigo Entertainment	Warner Bros. Pictures	100	$60,000,000	$468,060,692	The 35th animated film from Warner Bros. Pictures, the first animated film from Warner Animation Group, the fourth animated film from Village Roadshow Pictures and the first animated film to be based on Lego construction toys. Nominee of a Golden Globe Award for Best Animated Feature Film.
The Wind Rises	February 21, 2014	—N/a	Anime	Studio Ghibli	GKIDS	126	$30,000,000	$136,533,257	The 17th animated film from GKIDS and the 12th animated Studio Ghibli film to be theatrically released in the United States. Nominee of an Academy Award for Best Animated Feature.
The Pirate Fairy	February 28, 2014 (El Capitan Theatre); April 1, 2014 (official release, direct-to-video)	—N/a	Computer animation	Walt Disney Pictures; Disneytoon Studios	Walt Disney Studios Motion Pictures	78	—N/a	$63,998,725	A sequel to Tinker Bell, Tinker Bell and the Lost Treasure, Tinker Bell and the Great Fairy Rescue and Secret of the Wings, and the 13th animated film from DisneyToon Studios.
Ernest & Celestine	February 28, 2014	—N/a	Traditional animation	La Parti Productions; Les Armateurs; Melusine Productions	GKIDS	79	$10,785,233	$8,111,137	The 18th animated film from GKIDS. Nominee of an Academy Award for Best Animated Feature.
Short Peace	March 3, 2014	—N/a	Anime	Sunrise	Eleven Arts	66	—N/a	$628,807	The ninth animated film from Eleven Arts.
Mr. Peabody & Sherman	March 5, 2014 (Regency Village Theatre); March 7, 2014 (official release)	Almost Home	Computer animation	DreamWorks Animation; PDI/DreamWorks; Bullwinkle Studios	20th Century Fox	92	$145,000,000	$275,698,039	The 27th animated film from 20th Century Fox and the 28th animated film from DreamWorks Animation.
War of the Worlds: Goliath	March 7, 2014	—N/a	Traditional animation	Studio Climb; Sun Min Image Pictures	Barking Cow Media Group	88	—N/a	$13,385	The first animated film from Barking Cow Media Group.
Tiger & Bunny: The Rising	March 14, 2014	—N/a	Anime	Sunrise	Eleven Arts	90	—N/a	$6,168,617	The 10th animated film from Eleven Arts.
Rio 2	March 20, 2014 (Fontainebleau Miami Beach); April 11, 2014 (official release)	Almost Home	Computer animation	20th Century Fox Animation; Blue Sky Studios	20th Century Fox	101	$103,000,000	$498,781,117	A sequel to Rio, the 28th animated film from 20th Century Fox, the 12th animated film from 20th Century Fox Animation and the ninth animated film from Blue Sky Studios.
Legends of Oz: Dorothy's Return	May 3, 2014 (Regency Village Theatre); May 9, 2014 (official release)	—N/a	Computer animation	Summertime Entertainment; Prana Studios	Clarius Entertainment	92	$70,000,000	$21,755,418	The first animated film from Clarius Entertainment.
Kochadaiiyaan	May 23, 2014	—N/a	Computer animation	Media One Global Entertainment; Cinemorphic	Eros International	117	$125,000,000	$1,210,580	The first animated film from Eros International.
How to Train Your Dragon 2	May 16, 2014 (2014 Cannes Film Festival); June 8, 2014 (Westwood Village Theatre); June 13, 2014 (official release)	—N/a	Computer animation	DreamWorks Animation	20th Century Fox	102	$145,000,000	$621,537,519	A sequel to How to Train Your Dragon, the 29th animated film from 20th Century Fox and the 29th animated film from DreamWorks Animation. Nominee of an Academy Award for Best Animated Feature and winner of a Golden Globe Award for Best Animated Feature Film.
Postman Pat: The Movie	June 27, 2014	—N/a	Computer animation	Classic Media; RGH Pictures; Timeless Films	Shout! Factory	87	—N/a	$7,102,455	The first animated film from Shout! Factory and the first animated film to feature Postman Pat.
Planes: Fire & Rescue	July 15, 2014 (El Capitan Theatre); July 18, 2014 (official release)	—N/a	Computer animation	Walt Disney Pictures; Disneytoon Studios	Walt Disney Studios Motion Pictures	83	$50,000,000	$146,965,787	A sequel to Planes and the 14th animated film from DisneyToon Studios.
K: Missing Kings	July 18, 2014	—N/a	Anime	GoHands	Eleven Arts	73	—N/a	$826,323	The 11th animated film from Eleven Arts.
A Letter to Momo	July 23, 2014	—N/a	Anime	Production I.G	GKIDS	121	—N/a	$6,748,888	The 19th animated film from GKIDS.
Dragon Ball Z: Battle of Gods	August 5, 2014	—N/a	Anime	Toei Animation	20th Century Fox	105	—N/a	$50,461,371	The 30th animated film from 20th Century Fox and the first animated film to be based on Dragon Ball.
Teenage Mutant Ninja Turtles	August 3, 2014 (Regency Village Theatre); August 8, 2014 (official release)	—N/a	Computer animation/Live-action	Nickelodeon Movies; Platinum Dunes	Paramount Pictures	101	$125,000,000	$485,004,754	The second Paramount animated film with live-action and the 11th animated film from Nickelodeon Movies.
Road to Ninja: Naruto the Movie	August 29, 2014	—N/a	Anime	Studio Pierrot	Eleven Arts	110	$17,900,000	$17,876,559	The 12th animated film from Eleven Arts and the first animated film to be based on Naruto.
The Congress	August 29, 2014	—N/a	Traditional animation/Live-action	Pandora Filmproduktion	Drafthouse Films	123	$9,694,592	$758,754	The first animated film from Drafthouse Films.
Patema Inverted	August 29, 2014	—N/a	Anime	Studio Rikka	GKIDS	99	—N/a	—N/a	The 20th animated film from GKIDS.
Rocks in My Pockets	September 3, 2014	—N/a	Traditional animation	Locomotive Productions	Zeitgeist Films	89	—N/a	$34,236	The second animated film from Zeitgeist Films.
Thunder and The House of Magic	September 5, 2014	—N/a	Computer animation	nWave Pictures; StudioCanal; Umedia	Shout! Factory	85	$34,000,000	$64,197,205	The second animated film from Shout! Factory, the second animated film from StudioCanal and the fourth animated film from nWave Pictures.
Mummy, I'm a Zombie	September 20, 2014	—N/a	Computer animation	Abra Producciones	Phase 4 Films	83	—N/a	$120	A sequel to Daddy, I'm a Zombie and the second animated film from Phase 4 Films.
Jack and the Cuckoo-Clock Heart	September 24, 2014	—N/a	Computer animation	Duran; EuropaCorp; France 3 Cinéma uFilm; Walking the Dog	Shout! Factory	92	$23,000,000	$3,484,370	The third animated film from Shout! Factory and the second animated film from EuropaCorp.
The Boxtrolls	September 21, 2014 (Universal CityWalk); September 26, 2014 (official release)	—N/a	Stop-motion	Laika	Focus Features	96	$60,000,000	$108,255,770	The fourth animated film from Focus Features and the fourth animated film from Laika. Nominee of an Academy Award for Best Animated Feature and a Golden Globe Award for Best Animated Feature Film.
My Little Pony: Equestria Girls – Rainbow Rocks	September 27, 2014	—N/a	Flash animation	DHX Media; Hasbro Studios	Screenvision	73	—N/a	$360,736	A sequel to My Little Pony: Equestria Girls and the second animated film from Screenvision. Also spawned into two made-for-TV sequels.
The Hero of Color City	October 3, 2014	—N/a	Computer animation	Exodus Film Group	Magnolia Pictures	77	—N/a	$115,335	The first animated film from Magnolia Pictures.
The Book of Life	October 12, 2014 (Regal Cinemas L.A.); October 17, 2014 (official release)	—N/a	Computer animation	20th Century Fox Animation; Reel FX Animation Studios	20th Century Fox	95	$50,000,000	$99,783,556	The 31st animated film from 20th Century Fox, the 13th animated film from 20th Century Fox Animation, the second animated film from Reel FX Animation Studios and the first animated theatrical Day of the Dead-themed film. Nominee of a Golden Globe Award for Best Animated Feature Film.
The Tale of the Princess Kaguya	October 17, 2014	—N/a	Anime	Studio Ghibli	GKIDS	137	$49,000,000	$24,706,166	The 21st animated film from GKIDS and the 13th animated Studio Ghibli film to be theatrically released in the United States. Nominee of an Academy Award for Best Animated Feature.
Big Hero 6	November 4, 2014 (El Capitan Theatre); November 7, 2014 (official release)	Feast	Computer animation	Walt Disney Pictures; Walt Disney Animation Studios	Walt Disney Studios Motion Pictures	102	$165,000,000	$657,827,828	The 54th animated film from Walt Disney Animation Studios and the first animated film to be based on a Marvel comic. Winner of an Academy Award for Best Animated Feature and nominee of a Golden Globe Award for Best Animated Feature Film.
Giovanni's Island	November 7, 2014	—N/a	Anime	Production I.G	Warner Bros. Pictures	100	—N/a	$342,838	The 36th animated film from Warner Bros. Pictures.
Gladiators of Rome	November 11, 2014	—N/a	Computer animation	Rainbow S.p.A.	Viva Pictures	94	$45,000,000	$10,079,201	The first animated film from Viva Pictures.
The King and the Mockingbird	November 21, 2014	—N/a	Traditional animation	Gaumont		87	—N/a	$167,451	Originally finished in 1980.
Penguins of Madagascar	November 16, 2014 (Winter Village at Bryant Park Ice Rink); November 26, 2014 (official release)	—N/a	Computer animation	DreamWorks Animation; PDI/DreamWorks	20th Century Fox	92	$132,000,000	$373,515,621	A spin-off of Madagascar, the 32nd animated film from 20th Century Fox, the 30th animated film from DreamWorks Animation and the last film produced by PDI before their closure in 2015.
Expelled from Paradise	December 13, 2014	—N/a	Anime	Toei Animation; Graphinica	Eleven Arts	104	—N/a	$34,510	The 13th animated film from Eleven Arts.
Song of the Sea	December 19, 2014	—N/a	Traditional animation	Cartoon Saloon	GKIDS	94	$7,500,000	$4,190,670	The 22nd animated film from GKIDS and the second animated film from Cartoon Saloon. Nominee of an Academy Award for Best Animated Feature.
Paddington	January 10, 2015 (TCL Chinese Theatre); January 16, 2015 (official release)	—N/a	Computer animation/Live-action	Heyday Films; StudioCanal UK; TF1 Films Productions	StudioCanal	95	$54,700,000	$282,377,683	The first StudioCanal animated film with live-action and the first animated film to feature Paddington Bear.
Strange Magic	January 23, 2015	—N/a	Computer animation	Touchstone Pictures; Lucasfilm; Lucasfilm Animation	Walt Disney Studios Motion Pictures	99	$70,000,000	$13,603,453	The third animated film from Touchstone Pictures, the third animated film from Lucasfilm and the second animated film from Lucasfilm Animation.
Tinker Bell and the Legend of the NeverBeast	January 30, 2015 (El Capitan Theatre); March 3, 2015 (official release, direct-to-video)	—N/a	Computer animation	Walt Disney Pictures; Disneytoon Studios	Walt Disney Studios Motion Pictures	76	—N/a	$31,836,701	A sequel to Tinker Bell, Tinker Bell and the Lost Treasure, Tinker Bell and the Great Fairy Rescue, Secret of the Wings and The Pirate Fairy, and the 15th and final animated film from DisneyToon Studios before their closure in 2018.
The SpongeBob Movie: Sponge Out of Water	January 31, 2015 (AMC Lincoln Square Theatre); February 6, 2015 (official release)	—N/a	Traditional animation/Computer animation/Live-action	Paramount Animation; Nickelodeon Movies; United Plankton Films	Paramount Pictures	92	$60,000,000	$325,186,032	A sequel to The SpongeBob SquarePants Movie, the 37th animated film from Paramount Pictures, the first animated film from Paramount Animation and the 12th animated film from Nickelodeon Movies.
The Last: Naruto the Movie	February 20, 2015	—N/a	Anime	Studio Pierrot	Eleven Arts	112	—N/a	$2,949,185	A sequel to Road to Ninja: Naruto the Movie and the 14th animated film from Eleven Arts.
The Mind of Mark DeFriest	March 6, 2015	—N/a	Flash animation/Live action	Found Objects; Naked Edge Films	City Drive Films	100	—N/a	$10,021	The first animated film from City Drive Films.
Home	March 22, 2015 (Regency Village Theatre); March 27, 2015 (official release)	—N/a	Computer animation	DreamWorks Animation	20th Century Fox	94	$135,000,000	$386,041,607	The 33rd animated film from 20th Century Fox and the 31st animated film from DreamWorks Animation.
Cheatin'	April 3, 2015	—N/a	Traditional animation	Plymptoons		76	—N/a	$15,077	The sixth animated film from Bill Plympton.
Maya the Bee Movie	May 8, 2015	—N/a	Computer animation	Studio 100 Animation; Flying Bark Productions; Screen Australia	StudioCanal	88	—N/a	$28,638,603	The third animated film from StudioCanal.
When Marnie Was There	May 22, 2015	—N/a	Anime	Studio Ghibli	GKIDS	102	$10,500,000	$34,949,567	The 23rd animated film from GKIDS and the 14th animated Studio Ghibli film to be theatrically released in the United States. Nominee of an Academy Award for Best Animated Feature.
Back to the Jurassic	June 9, 2015	—N/a	Computer animation	CJ Entertainment	Clarius Entertainment	88	—N/a	$69,423	The first animated film from Clarius Entertainment.
Inside Out	June 8, 2015 (El Capitan Theatre); June 19, 2015 (official release)	Lava	Computer animation	Walt Disney Pictures; Pixar Animation Studios	Walt Disney Studios Motion Pictures	94	$175,000,000	$858,071,350	The 15th animated film from Pixar Animation Studios and the first animated film to be presented in Dolby Vision. Entered into the 2015 Cannes Film Festival and winner of an Academy Award for Best Animated Feature and a Golden Globe Award for Best Animated Feature Film.
The Wanted 18	June 19, 2015	—N/a	Stop-motion/Live-action	Kino Lorber		75	—N/a	$5,680	The first animated film from Kino Lorber.
Zarafa	July 3, 2015	—N/a	Traditional animation	Pathé; France 3 Cinéma	GKIDS	78	$8,600,000	$11,351,445	The 24th animated film from GKIDS and the third animated film from Pathé.
Minions	June 27, 2015 (Shrine Auditorium); July 10, 2015 (official release)	—N/a	Computer animation	Illumination Entertainment	Universal Pictures	91	$74,000,000	$1,159,398,397	A spin-off of Despicable Me, the 15th animated film from Universal Pictures and the fifth animated film from Illumination Entertainment.
Dragon Ball Z: Resurrection 'F'	April 11, 2015 (Grauman's Egyptian Theatre); August 4, 2015 (official release)	—N/a	Anime	Toei Animation	20th Century Fox	94	$5,000,000	$61,768,190	A sequel to Dragon Ball Z: Battle of Gods and the 34th animated film from 20th Century Fox.
Shaun the Sheep Movie	January 24, 2015 (Sundance Film Festival); August 7, 2015 (official release)	—N/a	Stop-motion	Aardman Animations	StudioCanal	85	$25,000,000	$106,209,378	The fourth animated film from StudioCanal and the sixth animated film from Aardman. Nominee of an Academy Award for Best Animated Feature and a Golden Globe Award for Best Animated Feature Film.
The Prophet	August 7, 2015	—N/a	Traditional animation	Ventanarosa; FFA Private Bank; Doha Film Institute; Participant Media	GKIDS	85	$12,000,000	$1,261,412	The 25th animated film from GKIDS.
Kurt Cobain: Montage of Heck	August 7, 2015	—N/a	Rotoscoping/Live action	HBO Documentary Films	Universal Pictures	132	—N/a	$687,649	The 16th animated film from Universal Pictures.
Huevos: Little Rooster's Egg-cellent Adventure	September 4, 2015	—N/a	Computer animation	Huevocartoon	Lionsgate	98	$5,300,000	$25,892,561	The sixth animated film from Lionsgate.
Love Live! The School Idol Movie	September 11, 2015	—N/a	Anime	ASCII Media Works; Bandai Visual; Bushiroad; Lantis; Sunrise; Shochiku	Azoland Pictures	99	—N/a	$21,292,009	The first animated film from Azoland Pictures.
Hotel Transylvania 2	September 25, 2015	—N/a	Computer animation	Columbia Pictures; Sony Pictures Animation; LStar Capital; MRC	Sony Pictures Releasing	89	$80,000,000	$474,800,000	A sequel to Hotel Transylvania, the 21st animated film from Columbia Pictures and the 10th animated film from Sony Pictures Animation.
Hell and Back	October 2, 2015	—N/a	Stop motion	ShadowMachine Films	Freestyle Releasing	86	—N/a	$157,768	The second animated film from Freestyle Releasing.
Boruto: Naruto the Movie	October 10, 2015	—N/a	Anime	Studio Pierrot	Eleven Arts	95	—N/a	$38,362,448	A sequel to Road to Ninja: Naruto the Movie and The Last: Naruto the Movie, and the 15th animated film from Eleven Arts.
Goosebumps	October 4, 2015 (Westwood Village Theatre); October 16, 2015 (official release)	—N/a	Computer animation/Live-action	Columbia Pictures; Sony Pictures Animation; LStar Capital; Village Roadshow Pictures; Original Film; Scholastic Entertainment	Sony Pictures Releasing	103	$58,000,000	$158,261,424	The sixth Columbia animated film with live-action, the fifth animated film from Village Roadshow Pictures, the 11th animated film from Sony Pictures Animation and the second animated film from Scholastic.
Extraordinary Tales	October 23, 2015	—N/a	Rotoscoping	Mélusine Productions	GKIDS	73	—N/a	—N/a	The 26th animated film from GKIDS.
The Peanuts Movie	October 19, 2015 (Pier 39); November 1, 2015 (Westwood Village Theatre); November 6, 2015 (official release)	Cosmic Scrat-tastrophe	Computer animation	20th Century Fox Animation; Blue Sky Studios	20th Century Fox	88	$99,000,000	$246,233,113	The 35th animated film from 20th Century Fox, the 14th animated film from 20th Century Fox Animation and the 10th animated film from Blue Sky Studios. Nominee of a Golden Globe Award for Best Animated Feature Film.
Ghost in the Shell: The New Movie	November 10, 2015	—N/a	Anime	Production I.G	Funimation Entertainment	100	—N/a	$1,713,406	A sequel to Ghost in the Shell and Ghost in the Shell 2: Innocence, and the third animated film from Funimation Entertainment.
The Good Dinosaur	November 17, 2015 (El Capitan Theatre); November 25, 2015 (official release)	Sanjay's Super Team	Computer animation	Walt Disney Pictures; Pixar Animation Studios	Walt Disney Studios Motion Pictures	93	$175,000,000	$332,207,671	The 16th animated film from Pixar Animation Studios. Nominee of a Golden Globe Award for Best Animated Feature Film.
Capture the Flag	December 4, 2015	—N/a	Computer animation	AMC Networks International Southern Europe; Mediaset España	Paramount Pictures	94	$12,500,000	$24,604,331	The 38th animated film from Paramount Pictures.
Boy and the World	December 11, 2015	—N/a	Traditional animation	Filme de Papel	GKIDS	80	—N/a	$277,143	The 27th animated film from GKIDS. Nominee of an Academy Award for Best Animated Feature.
Alvin and the Chipmunks: The Road Chip	December 12, 2015 (Zanuck Theater); December 18, 2015 (official release)	—N/a	Computer animation/Live-action	Fox 2000 Pictures; Regency Enterprises; Bagdasarian Company; Dune Entertainment	20th Century Fox	92	$90,000,000	$234,798,636	A sequel to Alvin and the Chipmunks, Alvin and the Chipmunks: The Squeakquel and Alvin and the Chipmunks: Chipwrecked, the 11th Fox animated film with live-action and the sixth animated film from Regency Enterprises.
Anomalisa	September 4, 2015 (Telluride Film Festival); December 30, 2015 (official release)	—N/a	Stop motion	HanWay Films; Starburns Industries; Snoot Films	Paramount Pictures	90	$8,000,000	$5,659,286	The 39th animated film from Paramount Pictures. Nominee of an Academy Award for Best Animated Feature and a Golden Globe Award for Best Animated Feature Film.
Only Yesterday	January 1, 2016	—N/a	Anime	Studio Ghibli	GKIDS	119	—N/a	$545,825	The 28th animated film from GKIDS and the 15th animated Studio Ghibli film to be theatrically released in the United States.
Norm of the North	January 15, 2016	—N/a	Computer animation	Assemblage Entertainment; Splash Entertainment	Lionsgate	90	$18,000,000	$30,734,502	The seventh animated film from Lionsgate, the first animated film from Assemblage Entertainment and the first animated film from Splash Entertainment. Also spawned into three direct-to-video sequels.
Monster Hunt	January 22, 2016	—N/a	Computer animation/Live-action	Heyi Pictures	FilmRise	104	$56,000,000	$387,053,506	The first FilmRise animated film with live-action.
Kung Fu Panda 3	January 16, 2016 (TCL Chinese Theatre); January 29, 2016 (official release)	—N/a	Computer animation	DreamWorks Animation; Oriental DreamWorks	20th Century Fox	95	$145,000,000	$521,170,825	A sequel to Kung Fu Panda and Kung Fu Panda 2, the 36th animated film from 20th Century Fox and the 32nd animated film from DreamWorks Animation.
Snowtime!	February 19, 2016	—N/a	Computer animation	Haoliners Animation; 3QU Media	Entertainment One	82	$12,500,000	$3,360,000	The first animated film from Entertainment One.
Zootopia	February 17, 2016 (El Capitan Theatre); March 4, 2016 (official release)	—N/a	Computer animation	Walt Disney Pictures; Walt Disney Animation Studios	Walt Disney Studios Motion Pictures	108	$150,000,000	$1,023,784,195	The 55th animated film from Walt Disney Animation Studios. Winner of an Academy Award for Best Animated Feature and a Golden Globe Award for Best Animated Feature Film.
The Boy and the Beast	March 4, 2016	—N/a	Anime	Studio Chizu	Funimation Entertainment	119	—N/a	$49,768,644	The fourth animated film from Funimation Entertainment.
Psycho-Pass: The Movie	March 15, 2016	—N/a	Anime	Production I.G	Funimation Entertainment	113	—N/a	$7,683,799	The fifth animated film from Funimation Entertainment.
April and the Extraordinary World	March 25, 2016	—N/a	Traditional animation	Arte France; CNC	GKIDS	106	$10,400,000	$495,879	The 29th animated film from GKIDS.
The Empire of Corpses	April 19, 2016	—N/a	Anime	Wit Studio	Funimation Entertainment	126	—N/a	$43,320	The sixth animated film from Funimation Entertainment.
Ratchet & Clank	April 29, 2016	—N/a	Computer animation	Rainmaker Entertainment; PlayStation Productions	Gramercy Pictures; Focus Features	94	$20,000,000	$13,385,737	The first animated film from Gramercy Pictures and the fifth animated film from Focus Features.
Harmony	May 17, 2016	—N/a	Anime	Studio 4°C	Funimation Entertainment	119	—N/a	$430,568	The seventh animated film from Funimation Entertainment.
The Angry Birds Movie	May 7, 2016 (Regency Village Theatre); May 20, 2016 (official release)	—N/a	Computer animation	Columbia Pictures; Rovio Animation	Sony Pictures Releasing	97	$73,000,000	$352,333,929	The 22nd animated film from Columbia Pictures and the first animated film to be based on Angry Birds.
Teenage Mutant Ninja Turtles: Out of the Shadows	June 3, 2016	—N/a	Computer animation/Live-action	Nickelodeon Movies; Platinum Dunes; Gama Entertainment	Paramount Pictures	112	$135,000,000	$245,623,848	A sequel to Teenage Mutant Ninja Turtles, the third Paramount animated film with live-action and the 13th animated film from Nickelodeon Movies.
Finding Dory	June 8, 2016 (El Capitan Theatre); June 17, 2016 (official release)	Piper	Computer animation	Walt Disney Pictures; Pixar Animation Studios	Walt Disney Studios Motion Pictures	97	$200,000,000	$1,028,570,942	A sequel to Finding Nemo and the 17th animated film from Pixar Animation Studios.
Nuts!	June 22, 2016	—N/a	Flash animation/Live action	Cartuna		79	—N/a	$44,230	The first animated film from Cartuna.
The Secret Life of Pets	June 25, 2016 (David H. Koch Theater); July 8, 2016 (official release)	Mower Minions	Computer animation	Illumination Entertainment	Universal Pictures	86	$75,000,000	$875,458,631	The 17th animated film from Universal Pictures and the sixth animated film from Illumination Entertainment.
Phantom Boy	July 15, 2016	—N/a	Traditional animation	Folimage; Lunanime; France 3 Cinema	GKIDS	85	$6,681,180	$221,016	The 30th animated film from GKIDS.
Ice Age: Collision Course	July 16, 2016 (Zanuck Theater); July 22, 2016 (official release)	—N/a	Computer animation	20th Century Fox Animation; Blue Sky Studios	20th Century Fox	94	$105,000,000	$408,754,975	A sequel to Ice Age, Ice Age: The Meltdown, Ice Age: Dawn of the Dinosaurs and Ice Age: Continental Drift, the 37th animated film from 20th Century Fox, the 15th animated film from 20th Century Fox Animation and the 11th animated film from Blue Sky Studios.
Batman: The Killing Joke	July 22, 2016 (San Diego Comic-Con); July 25, 2016 (official release)	—N/a	Traditional animation	DC Entertainment; Warner Bros. Animation	Fathom Events	76	$3,500,000	$4,462,034	The first animated film from Fathom Events and the first animated film from DC Entertainment.
The Little Prince	August 5, 2016	—N/a	Computer animation/Stop motion	Method Animation	Paramount Pictures	108	$77,500,000	$97,571,250	The 40th animated film from Paramount Pictures.
Sausage Party	August 9, 2016 (Westwood Village Theatre); August 12, 2016 (official release)	—N/a	Computer animation	Columbia Pictures; Annapurna Pictures; Point Grey Pictures; Nitrogen Studios	Sony Pictures Releasing	89	$19,000,000	$140,705,322	The 23rd animated film from Columbia Pictures and the first animated film from Annapurna Pictures.
Kubo and the Two Strings	August 15, 2016 (Universal CityWalk); August 19, 2016 (official release)	—N/a	Stop motion	Laika	Focus Features	101	$60,000,000	$76,249,438	The sixth animated film from Focus Features and the fifth animated film from Laika. Nominee of an Academy Award for Best Animated Feature and a Golden Globe Award for Best Animated Feature Film.
Kingsglaive: Final Fantasy XV	August 19, 2016	—N/a	Computer animation	Visual Works; Digic Pictures; Image Engine	Vertical Entertainment	115	—N/a	$5,725,482	A sequel to Brotherhood: Final Fantasy XV and the first animated film from Vertical Entertainment.
The Wild Life	September 9, 2016	—N/a	Computer animation	Illuminata Pictures nWave Pictures uFilm	StudioCanal	91	$13,000,000	$40,075,446	The fifth animated film from StudioCanal and the fifth animated film from nWave Pictures.
Digimon Adventure tri. Part 1: Reunion	September 15, 2016	—N/a	Anime	Toei Animation	Eleven Arts	86	—N/a	$1,928,616	The 16th animated film from Eleven Arts.
Storks	September 17, 2016 (Regency Village Theatre); September 23, 2016 (official release)	The Master	Computer animation	Warner Animation Group; RatPac-Dune Entertainment	Warner Bros. Pictures	87	$70,000,000	$183,388,953	The 37th animated film from Warner Bros. Pictures and the second animated film from Warner Animation Group.
Tower	September 28, 2016	—N/a	Rotoscoping	Go-Valley; ITVS	Kino Lorber	82	—N/a	$101,987	The second animated film from Kino Lorber.
L.O.R.D: Legend of Ravaging Dynasties	September 30, 2016	—N/a	Computer animation	Heli Chen'guang International Media; Shanghai Zestful; Unique Ideal Media	Asia Releasing	117	—N/a	$58,089,494	The first animated film from Asia Releasing.
Long Way North	September 30, 2016	—N/a	Traditional animation	Sacrebleu Productions; Maybe Movies; France 3 Cinéma; Studio 2 Minutes; Nørlum	Shout! Factory	81	—N/a	$60,352	The fourth animated film from Shout! Factory.
Blinky Bill the Movie	October 7, 2016	—N/a	Computer animation	Assemblage Entertainment; Flying Bark Productions	Shout! Factory	91	—N/a	$4,675,877	The fifth animated film from Shout! Factory, the second animated film from Assemblage Entertainment and the first animated film to feature Blinky Bill.
Miss Hokusai	October 14, 2016	—N/a	Anime	Production I.G	GKIDS	90	—N/a	$377,702	The 31st animated film from GKIDS.
Legend Quest: The Legend of the Chupacabra	October 14, 2016	—N/a	Traditional animation	Ánima Estudios	Pantelion Films	83	$1,600,000	$5,138,140	The first animated film from Pantelion Films.
Yo-kai Watch: The Movie	October 15, 2016	—N/a	Anime	OLM	Eleven Arts	95	—N/a	$99,481,307	The 17th animated film from Eleven Arts.
Trolls	October 24, 2016 (Regency Village Theatre); November 4, 2016 (official release)	—N/a	Computer animation	DreamWorks Animation	20th Century Fox	92	$125,000,000	$346,864,886	The 38th animated film from 20th Century Fox and the 33rd animated film from DreamWorks Animation.
Chaar Sahibzaade: Rise of Banda Singh Bahadur	November 11, 2016	—N/a	Computer animation	Baweja Movies	Eros International	134	$2,759,322	$1,256,852	A sequel to Chaar Sahibzaade, and the second animated film from Eros International.
Moana	November 14, 2016 (El Capitan Theatre); November 23, 2016 (official release)	Inner Workings; Once Upon a Studio (2023 re-issue)	Computer animation	Walt Disney Pictures; Walt Disney Animation Studios	Walt Disney Studios Motion Pictures	107	$150,000,000	$643,331,111	The 56th animated film from Walt Disney Animation Studios and the 12th Disney Princess. Nominee of an Academy Award for Best Animated Feature and a Golden Globe Award for Best Animated Feature Film. Also adapted into a 2026 live-action film.
Nerdland	April 14, 2016 (Tribeca Film Festival); December 6, 2016 (official release)	—N/a	Flash animation	AKW Worldwide; Pariah; Titmouse	Samuel Goldwyn Films	83	—N/a	—N/a	The first animated film from Samuel Goldwyn Films.
Sing	December 3, 2016 (Microsoft Theater); December 21, 2016 (official release)	—N/a	Computer animation	Illumination Entertainment	Universal Pictures	108	$75,000,000	$634,208,384	The 18th animated film from Universal Pictures and the seventh animated film from Illumination Entertainment. Nominee of a Golden Globe Award for Best Animated Feature Film.
Ocean Waves	December 28, 2016	—N/a	Anime	Studio Ghibli	GKIDS	72	—N/a	$87,738	The 32nd animated film from GKIDS and the 16th animated Studio Ghibli film to be theatrically released in the United States.
One Piece Film: Gold	January 10, 2017	—N/a	Anime	Toei Animation	Funimation Entertainment	120	—N/a	$66,207,073	The eighth animated film from Funimation Entertainment.
Monster Trucks	January 13, 2017	—N/a	Computer animation/Live-action	Paramount Animation; Nickelodeon Movies; Disruption Entertainment	Paramount Pictures	105	$125,000,000	$64,493,915	The fourth Paramount animated film with live-action, the second animated film from Paramount Animation and the 14th animated film from Nickelodeon Movies.
The Red Turtle	January 20, 2017	—N/a	Traditional animation	Studio Ghibli; Wild Bunch	Sony Pictures Classics	81	—N/a	$6,591,789	The sixth animated film from Sony Pictures Classics and the 17th animated Studio Ghibli film to be theatrically released in the United States. Nominee of an Academy Award for Best Animated Feature.
Yu-Gi-Oh! The Dark Side of Dimensions	January 27, 2017	—N/a	Anime	Studio Gallop	Screenvision	129	—N/a	$7,445,186	The third animated film from Screenvision.
The Lego Batman Movie	February 4, 2017 (Regency Village Theatre); February 10, 2017 (official release)	—N/a	Computer animation	Warner Animation Group; DC Entertainment; RatPac-Dune Entertainment; Vertigo Entertainment	Warner Bros. Pictures	104	$80,000,000	$311,950,384	A spin-off of The Lego Movie, the 38th animated film from Warner Bros. Pictures, the second animated film from DC Entertainment and the third animated film from Warner Animation Group.
Rock Dog	February 24, 2017	—N/a	Computer animation	Huayi Brothers	Summit Premiere	90	$60,000,000	$23,157,646	The first animated film from Summit Premiere.
My Life as a Zucchini	February 24, 2017	—N/a	Stop-motion	Rita Productions; Blue Spirit; Gebeka Films; KNM	GKIDS	68	$8,000,000	$5,873,256	The 33rd animated film from GKIDS. Nominee of an Academy Award for Best Animated Feature.
Sword Art Online the Movie: Ordinal Scale	March 9, 2017	—N/a	Anime	A-1 Pictures	Eleven Arts	120	—N/a	$29,322,339	The 18th animated film from Eleven Arts.
The Boss Baby	March 21, 2017 (AMC Lincoln Square Theatre); March 31, 2017 (official release)	—N/a	Computer animation	DreamWorks Animation	20th Century Fox	97	$125,000,000	$527,965,936	The 39th animated film from 20th Century Fox and the 34th animated film from DreamWorks Animation. Nominee of an Academy Award for Best Animated Feature and a Golden Globe Award for Best Animated Feature Film.
Smurfs: The Lost Village	April 1, 2017 (Arclight Theatre); April 7, 2017 (official release)	—N/a	Computer animation	Columbia Pictures; Sony Pictures Animation; Kerner Entertainment Company; LStar Capital	Sony Pictures Releasing	90	$60,000,000	$197,183,546	The 24th animated film from Columbia Pictures, the 11th animated film from Sony Pictures Animation and the third animated film from the Kerner Entertainment Company.
Your Name	April 7, 2017	—N/a	Anime	CoMix Wave Films	Funimation Entertainment	106	—N/a	$357,986,087	The ninth animated film from Funimation Entertainment.
Spark: A Space Tail	April 14, 2017	—N/a	Computer animation	Red Rover International; ToonBox Entertainment; Gulfstream Pictures	Open Road Films	92	—N/a	$1,040,689	The second animated film from Open Road Films.
My Entire High School Sinking into the Sea	April 14, 2017	—N/a	Anime	Washington Square Films; Electric Chinoland; Low Spark Films	GKIDS	76	—N/a	$68,883	The 34th animated film from GKIDS.
Captain Underpants: The First Epic Movie	May 21, 2017 (Regency Village Theatre); June 2, 2017 (official release)	—N/a	Computer animation	DreamWorks Animation	20th Century Fox	88	$38,000,000	$125,427,681	The 40th animated film from 20th Century Fox and the 35th animated film from DreamWorks Animation.
Black Butler: Book of the Atlantic	June 12, 2017	—N/a	Anime	A-1 Pictures; Aniplex; Square Enix Company	Funimation Entertainment	101	—N/a	$511,132	The ninth animated film from Funimation Entertainment.
Cars 3	June 10, 2017 (Disneyland); June 16, 2017 (official release)	Lou	Computer animation	Walt Disney Pictures; Pixar Animation Studios	Walt Disney Studios Motion Pictures	102	$175,000,000	$383,930,656	A sequel to Cars and Cars 2, and the 18th animated film from Pixar Animation Studios.
Despicable Me 3	June 24, 2017 (Shrine Auditorium); June 30, 2017 (official release)	—N/a	Computer animation	Illumination	Universal Pictures	89	$80,000,000	$1,034,800,131	A sequel to Despicable Me and Despicable Me 2, the 19th animated film from Universal Pictures and the eighth animated film from Illumination.
The Girl Without Hands	July 21, 2017	—N/a	Traditional animation	Les Films Sauvages; Les Films Pelléas	GKIDS	75	—N/a	$121,020	The 35th animated film from GKIDS.
The Emoji Movie	July 23, 2017 (Regency Village Theatre); July 28, 2017 (official release)	Puppy!	Computer animation	Columbia Pictures; Sony Pictures Animation	Sony Pictures Releasing	86	$50,000,000	$217,776,646	The 25th animated film from Columbia Pictures and the 12th animated film from Sony Pictures Animation. Winner of a Golden Raspberry Award for Worst Picture.
The Nut Job 2: Nutty by Nature	August 5, 2017 (Regal Cinemas L.A.); August 11, 2017 (official release)	—N/a	Computer animation	Red Rover International; ToonBox Entertainment; Gulfstream Pictures	Open Road Films	91	$40,000,000	$68,743,485	A sequel to The Nut Job and the third animated film from Open Road Films.
In This Corner of the World	August 11, 2017	—N/a	Anime	MAPPA	Funimation Entertainment	129	$2,200,000	$19,496,308	The 10th animated film from Funimation Entertainment.
Mune: Guardian of the Moon	August 12, 2017	—N/a	Computer animation	On Animation Studios	Paramount Pictures	86	$17,000,000	$8,305,708	The 41st animated film from Paramount Pictures.
Fairy Tail: Dragon Cry	August 14, 2017	—N/a	Anime	A-1 Pictures	Funimation Entertainment	85	—N/a	$1,420,035	The 11th animated film from Funimation Entertainment.
Leap!	August 19, 2017 (The Grove); August 25, 2017 (official release)	—N/a	Computer animation	L'Atelier Animation	Entertainment One	89	$30,000,000	$21,929,861	The second animated film from Entertainment One.
Revolting Rhymes	August 29, 2017	—N/a	Computer animation	Magic Light Pictures; Triggerfish Animation Studios	GKIDS	56	—N/a	—N/a	The 36th animated film from GKIDS and the second animated film from Triggerfish Animation Studios.
Napping Princess	September 8, 2017	—N/a	Anime	Signal.MD	GKIDS	111	—N/a	$1,176,216	The 37th animated film from GKIDS.
The Lego Ninjago Movie	September 16, 2017 (Regency Village Theatre); September 22, 2017 (official release)	—N/a	Computer animation/Live-action	Warner Animation Group; Animal Logic; Vertigo Entertainment	Warner Bros. Pictures	101	$70,000,000	$123,081,555	Another spin-off of The Lego Movie, the 39th animated film from Warner Bros. Pictures, the fourth animated film from Warner Animation Group and the fifth animated film from Animal Logic.
Loving Vincent	September 22, 2017	—N/a	Rotoscoping	BreakThru Productions; Trademark Films	Good Deed Entertainment	95	$5,500,000	$42,187,665	The first animated film from Good Deed Entertainment. Nominee of an Academy Award for Best Animated Feature and a Golden Globe Award for Best Animated Feature Film.
Window Horses	September 29, 2017	—N/a	Flash animation	First Pond Entertainment		89	—N/a	—N/a	The first animated film from First Pond Entertainment.
My Little Pony: The Movie	September 24, 2017 (AMC Lincoln Square Theatre); October 6, 2017 (official release)	Hanazuki: Full of Treasures	Traditional animation	Allspark Pictures; DHX Media	Lionsgate	99	$6,500,000	$60,330,833	The eighth animated film from Lionsgate.
A Silent Voice	October 20, 2017	—N/a	Anime	Kyoto Animation	Eleven Arts	130	—N/a	$30,490,447	The 19th animated film from Eleven Arts.
Pokémon the Movie: I Choose You!	November 5, 2017	—N/a	Anime	OLM; OLM Digital	Fathom Events	97	—N/a	$37,552,144	The second animated film from Fathom Events.
The Breadwinner	November 17, 2017	—N/a	Traditional animation	Cartoon Saloon; Aircraft Pictures; Guru Studio	GKIDS	93	$10,000,000	$2,790,214	The 38th animated film from GKIDS and the third animated film from Cartoon Saloon. Nominee of an Academy Award for Best Animated Feature and a Golden Globe Award for Best Animated Feature Film.
The Star	November 12, 2017 (Regency Village Theatre); November 17, 2017 (official release)	—N/a	Computer animation	Columbia Pictures; Sony Pictures Animation; The Jim Henson Company; Franklin Entertainment; Walden Media; Affirm Films	Sony Pictures Releasing	86	$20,000,000	$62,856,743	The 26th animated film from Columbia Pictures, the 13th animated film from Sony Pictures Animation, the first animated film from The Jim Henson Company and the first animated film from Walden Media.
Coco	November 8, 2017 (El Capitan Theatre); November 22, 2017 (official release)	Olaf's Frozen Adventure	Computer animation	Walt Disney Pictures; Pixar Animation Studios	Walt Disney Studios Motion Pictures	105	$225,000,000	$807,816,196	The 19th animated film from Pixar Animation Studios. Winner of an Academy Award for Best Animated Feature and a Golden Globe Award for Best Animated Feature Film.
Tad the Lost Explorer and the Secret of King Midas	December 1, 2017	—N/a	Computer animation	Lightbox Entertainment	Paramount Pictures	85	—N/a	$35,704,046	A sequel to Tad, The Lost Explorer and the 42nd animated film from Paramount Pictures.
Ferdinand	December 10, 2017 (Zanuck Theater); December 15, 2017 (official release)	—N/a	Computer animation	20th Century Fox Animation; Blue Sky Studios	20th Century Fox	108	$111,000,000	$296,069,199	The 41st animated film from 20th Century Fox, the 16th animated film from 20th Century Fox Animation and the 12th animated film from Blue Sky Studios. Nominee of an Academy Award for Best Animated Feature and a Golden Globe Award for Best Animated Feature Film.
Birdboy: The Forgotten Children	December 15, 2017	—N/a	Traditional animation	Studio 4°C	GKIDS	76	—N/a	$52,366	The 39th animated film from GKIDS.
Paddington 2	January 6, 2018 (Regency Village Theatre); January 12, 2018 (official release)	—N/a	Computer animation/Live action	Heyday Films	StudioCanal	104	$40,000,000	$227,978,645	A sequel to Paddington, the second StudioCanal animated film with live action and the highest-rated film on Rotten Tomatoes.
Space Chicken	January 12, 2018	—N/a	Computer animation	Aronnax Studios; Pajarraco Films	Lionsgate	88	$8,000,000	$8,431,194	The ninth animated film from Lionsgate.
Mary and the Witch's Flower	January 18, 2018	—N/a	Anime	Studio Ponoc	GKIDS	103	—N/a	$42,170,089	The 40th animated film from GKIDS.
Have a Nice Day	January 26, 2018	—N/a	Traditional animation	Nezha Bros. Pictures; Le-joy Animation Studio	Strand Releasing	75	$10,000,000	$504,003	The first animated film from Strand Releasing.
Digimon Adventure tri. Part 4: Loss	February 1, 2018	—N/a	Anime	Toei Animation	Eleven Arts	78	—N/a	$59,114	A sequel to Digimon Adventure tri. Part 1: Reunion, Digimon Adventure tri. Part 2: Determination and Digimon Adventure tri. Part 3: Confession, and the 20th animated film from Eleven Arts.
Bilal: A New Breed of Hero	February 2, 2018	—N/a	Computer animation	Barajoun Entertainment	Gulf Film	110	$30,000,000	$3,830,832	The first animated film from Gulf Film.
Peter Rabbit	February 3, 2018 (The Grove); February 9, 2018 (official release)	—N/a	Computer animation/Live-action	Columbia Pictures; Sony Pictures Animation; Olive Bridge Entertainment; Animal Logic; 2.0 Entertainment; Screen Australia	Sony Pictures Releasing	95	$50,000,000	$351,266,433	The seventh Columbia animated film with live-action, the 14th animated film from Sony Pictures Animation, the sixth animated film from Animal Logic and the first animated film to feature Peter Rabbit.
Monster Family	February 9, 2018	—N/a	Computer animation	Ambient Entertainment	Viva Pictures	96	$30,000,000	$28,821,994	The second animated film from Viva Pictures.
Mazinger Z: Infinity	February 11, 2018	—N/a	Anime	Toei Animation	Fathom Events	95	—N/a	$4,812,371	The third animated film from Fathom Events.
Tehran Taboo	February 14, 2018	—N/a	Rotoscoping	Little Dream Entertainment	Kino Lorber	96	—N/a	$349,886	The third animated film from Kino Lorber.
Early Man	January 20, 2018 (BFI Southbank); February 16, 2018 (official release)	—N/a	Stop motion	Aardman Animations; BFI	StudioCanal	88	$50,000,000	$54,622,814	The sixth animated film from StudioCanal and the seventh animated film from Aardman.
Mind Game	February 16, 2018	—N/a	Anime	Studio 4°C	GKIDS	103	—N/a	$36,613	The 41st animated film from GKIDS. Originally released in 2004.
The Big Bad Fox and Other Tales...	March 8, 2018	—N/a	Traditional animation	Folivari; Panique! Production	GKIDS	82	$3,000,000	$9,399,067	The 42nd animated film from GKIDS.
Sheep and Wolves	March 9, 2018	—N/a	Computer animation	Wizart Animation; CTB Film Company	Vertical Entertainment	85	$3,400,000	$4,190,750	The second animated film from Vertical Entertainment.
Isle of Dogs	March 17, 2018 (SXSW Film Festival); March 23, 2018 (limited release); April 13, 2018 (official release)	—N/a	Stop-motion	Babelsberg Studio; Indian Paintbrush; American Empirical Pictures	Fox Searchlight Pictures	101	—N/a	$64,299,545	The second animated film from Wes Anderson and the second animated film from Fox Searchlight Pictures. Nominee of an Academy Award for Best Animated Feature and a Golden Globe Award for Best Animated Feature Film.
Sherlock Gnomes	March 23, 2018	—N/a	Computer animation	Paramount Animation; Metro-Goldwyn-Mayer; Rocket Pictures	Paramount Pictures	86	$59,000,000	$90,497,778	A sequel to Gnomeo & Juliet, the 43rd animated film from Paramount Pictures, the eighth animated film from Metro-Goldwyn-Mayer and the third animated film from Paramount Animation.
Ice Dragon: Legend of the Blue Daisies	March 24, 2018	—N/a	Flash animation	Chelsea Road Productions	Fathom Events	70	—N/a	$20,549	The fourth animated film from Fathom Events.
The Son of Bigfoot	March 30, 2018	—N/a	Computer animation	nWave Pictures; StudioCanal	Viva Pictures	92	$20,000,000	$47,046,281	The third animated film from Viva Pictures, the seventh animated film from StudioCanal and the sixth animated film from nWave Pictures. Also spawned into a 2020 sequel Bigfoot Family.
Sgt. Stubby: An American Hero	March 27, 2018 (Regal Cinemas L.A.); April 13, 2018 (official release)	—N/a	Computer animation	Mikros Image	Fun Academy Motion Pictures	84	$25,000,000	$4,932,694	The first animated film from Fun Academy Motion Pictures.
Maya the Bee: The Honey Games	April 27, 2018	—N/a	Computer animation	Studio 100 Animation; Flying Bark Productions; Screen Australia	StudioCanal	84	—N/a	$10,824,302	A sequel to Maya the Bee Movie and the eighth animated film from StudioCanal.
Zoo Wars	April 27, 2018	—N/a	Computer animation	Parade Deck Films		70	—N/a	$8,998	The first animated film from Parade Deck Films.
The Boxcar Children: Surprise Island	May 8, 2018	—N/a	Computer animation	Hammerhead Productions	Fathom Events	81	—N/a	$78,676	A sequel to The Boxcar Children and the fifth animated film from Fathom Events.
Digimon Adventure tri. Part 5: Coexistence	May 10, 2018	—N/a	Anime	Toei Animation	Eleven Arts	86	—N/a	$382,119	A sequel to Digimon Adventure tri. Part 1: Reunion, Digimon Adventure tri. Part 2: Determination, Digimon Adventure tri. Part 3: Confession and Digimon Adventure tri. Part 4: Loss, and the 21st animated film from Eleven Arts.
Lu Over the Wall	May 11, 2018	—N/a	Anime	Science Saru	GKIDS	112	—N/a	$161,253	The 43rd animated film from GKIDS.
Fate/stay night: Heaven's Feel I. presage flower	June 5, 2018	—N/a	Anime	Ufotable	Fathom Events	120	—N/a	$17,423,075	The sixth animated film from Fathom Events.
Haikara-San: Here Comes Miss Modern	June 8, 2018	—N/a	Anime	Nippon Animation	Eleven Arts	97	—N/a	$16,572	The 22nd animated film from Eleven Arts.
Incredibles 2	June 5, 2018 (El Capitan Theatre); June 15, 2018 (official release)	Bao	Computer animation	Walt Disney Pictures; Pixar Animation Studios	Walt Disney Studios Motion Pictures	118	$200,000,000	$1,242,805,359	A sequel to The Incredibles and the 20th animated film from Pixar Animation Studios. Nominee of an Academy Award for Best Animated Feature and a Golden Globe Award for Best Animated Feature Film.
Fireworks	July 3, 2018	—N/a	Anime	Shaft	GKIDS	90	—N/a	$25,672,406	The 44th animated film from GKIDS.
Hotel Transylvania 3: Summer Vacation	June 30, 2018 (Regency Village Theatre); July 13, 2018 (official release)	—N/a	Computer animation	Columbia Pictures; Sony Pictures Animation; MRC	Sony Pictures Releasing	97	$80,000,000	$528,583,774	A sequel to Hotel Transylvania and Hotel Transylvania 2, the 27th animated film from Columbia Pictures and the 15th animated film from Sony Pictures Animation.
Maquia: When the Promised Flower Blooms	July 20, 2018	—N/a	Anime	P.A. Works	Eleven Arts	115	—N/a	$4,533,502	The 23rd animated film from Eleven Arts.
Teen Titans Go! To the Movies	July 22, 2018 (TCL Chinese Theatre); July 27, 2018 (official release)	DC Super Hero Girls: #TheLateBatsby	Flash animation	Warner Bros. Animation; DC Entertainment	Warner Bros. Pictures	84	$10,000,000	$52,090,236	The 40th animated film from Warner Bros. Pictures and the third animated film from DC Entertainment.
Luis and the Aliens	August 17, 2018	—N/a	Computer animation	Majestic Filmverleih; Telepool	Viva Pictures	86	—N/a	$12,632,840	The fourth animated film from Viva Pictures.
The Night Is Short, Walk On Girl	August 21, 2018	—N/a	Anime	Science Saru	GKIDS	93	—N/a	$3,878,208	The 45th animated film from GKIDS.
The Snow Queen 3: Fire and Ice	August 31, 2018	—N/a	Computer animation	Wizart Animation	Vertical Entertainment	89	$6,300,000	$24,644,317	A sequel to The Snow Queen and The Snow Queen 2, and the third animated film from Vertical Entertainment.
A Wizard's Tale	September 14, 2018	—N/a	Computer animation	Ánima Estudios; Prime Focus World; GFM Animation; Grump Productions	Blue Fox Entertainment	97	—N/a	$5,487,261	The first animated film from Blue Fox Entertainment.
Digimon Adventure tri. Part 6: Future	September 20, 2018	—N/a	Anime	Toei Animation	Eleven Arts	98	—N/a	$54,324	A sequel to Digimon Adventure tri. Part 1: Reunion, Digimon Adventure tri. Part 2: Determination, Digimon Adventure tri. Part 3: Confession, Digimon Adventure tri. Part 4: Loss and Digimon Adventure tri. Part 5: Coexistence, and the 24th animated film from Eleven Arts.
My Hero Academia: Two Heroes	September 25, 2018	—N/a	Anime	Bones	Funimation Entertainment	96	—N/a	$21,022,724	The 12th animated film from Funimation Entertainment.
Smallfoot	September 23, 2018 (Regency Village Theatre); September 28, 2018 (official release)	—N/a	Computer animation	Warner Animation Group; Zaftig Films	Warner Bros. Pictures	96	$80,000,000	$214,040,103	The 41st animated film from Warner Bros. Pictures and the fifth animated film from Warner Animation Group.
Liyana	October 10, 2018	—N/a	Computer animation/Live action	Intaba Creative	Abramorama	76	—N/a	$44,045	The first animated film from Abramorama.
Mutafukaz	October 11, 2018	—N/a	Traditional animation	Ankama Animations; Studio 4°C	GKIDS	94	—N/a	$461,724	The 46th animated film from GKIDS.
Goosebumps 2: Haunted Halloween	October 7, 2018 (Sony Pictures Studios); October 12, 2018 (official release)	—N/a	Computer animation/Live-action	Columbia Pictures; Sony Pictures Animation; Original Film; Scholastic Entertainment; Silvertongue Films	Sony Pictures Releasing	90	$35,000,000	$93,320,380	A sequel to Goosebumps, the eighth Columbia animated film with live-action, the 16th animated film from Sony Pictures Animation and the third animated film from Scholastic.
The Legend of Hallowaiian	October 19, 2018	—N/a	Computer animation	Arcana Studio	Viva Pictures	82	—N/a	$53,738	The fifth animated film from Viva Pictures.
RWBY Volume 6	October 25, 2018	—N/a	Anime	Rooster Teeth Animation	Fathom Events	259	—N/a	$238,379	The seventh animated film from Fathom Events.
Liz and the Blue Bird	November 2, 2018	—N/a	Anime	Kyoto Animation	Eleven Arts	90	—N/a	$737,286	The 24th animated film from Eleven Arts.
The Grinch	November 3, 2018 (Lincoln Center); November 9, 2018 (official release)	Yellow is the New Black	Computer animation	Illumination	Universal Pictures	86	$75,000,000	$511,595,957	The 20th animated film from Universal Pictures and the ninth animated film from Illumination.
Ralph Breaks the Internet	November 5, 2018 (El Capitan Theatre); November 21, 2018 (official release)	—N/a	Computer animation	Walt Disney Pictures; Walt Disney Animation Studios	Walt Disney Studios Motion Pictures	112	$175,000,000	$529,323,962	A sequel to Wreck-It-Ralph and the 57th animated film from Walt Disney Animation Studios. Nominee of an Academy Award for Best Animated Feature and a Golden Globe Award for Best Animated Feature Film.
Pokémon the Movie: The Power of Us	November 24, 2018	—N/a	Anime	Wit Studio	Fathom Events	97	—N/a	$23,740,788	A sequel to Pokémon the Movie: I Choose You! and the eighth animated film from Fathom Events.
Mirai	November 29, 2018	—N/a	Anime	Studio Chizu	GKIDS	98	—N/a	$28,756,961	The 47th animated film from GKIDS. Nominee of an Academy Award for Best Animated Feature and a Golden Globe Award for Best Animated Feature Film.
Elliot the Littlest Reindeer	November 30, 2018	—N/a	Computer animation	Awesometown Entertainment	Screen Media Films	90	—N/a	$2,301,905	The first animated film from Screen Media Films.
Racetime	December 7, 2018	—N/a	Computer animation	CarpeDiem Film & TV; Singing Frog Studio	Entertainment One	90	$11,000,000	$3,493,043	The third animated film from Entertainment One.
Henchmen	December 7, 2018	—N/a	Computer animation	Bron Studios	Entertainment One	82	—N/a	$90,717	The fourth animated film from Entertainment One.
Spider-Man: Into the Spider-Verse	December 1, 2018 (Regency Village Theatre); December 14, 2018 (official release)	—N/a	Computer animation	Columbia Pictures; Sony Pictures Animation; Marvel Entertainment; Arad Productions; Lord Miller Productions; Pascal Pictures	Sony Pictures Releasing	117	$90,000,000	$375,540,831	The 28th animated film from Columbia Pictures and the 17th animated film from Sony Pictures Animation. Winner of an Academy Award for Best Animated Feature and a Golden Globe Award for Best Animated Feature Film.
Mary Poppins Returns	November 29, 2018 (Dolby Theatre); December 19, 2018 (official release)	—N/a	Traditional animation/Computer animation/Live-action	Walt Disney Pictures; Lucamar Productions; Marc Platt Productions	Walt Disney Studios Motion Pictures	130	$130,000,000	$349,546,142	A sequel to Mary Poppins and the 14th Disney animated film with live action.
Modest Heroes	January 10, 2019	—N/a	Anime	Studio Ponoc	GKIDS	53	—N/a	$178,027	The 48th animated film from GKIDS.
Tall Tales from the Magical Garden of Antoon Krings	January 11, 2019	—N/a	Computer animation	On Animation Studios	Funimation Entertainment	88	—N/a	$14,340,726	The 13th animated film from Funimation Entertainment.
Dragon Ball Super: Broly	December 13, 2018 (TCL Chinese Theatre); January 16, 2019 (official release)	—N/a	Anime	Toei Animation	20th Century Fox	101	$8,500,000	$115,560,610	The 42nd animated film from 20th Century Fox and the last Fox film to be released before being acquired by Disney.
Tito and the Birds	January 25, 2019	—N/a	Flash animation	Bits Produções	Shout! Factory	73	—N/a	$4,332	The sixth animated film from Shout! Factory.
I Want to Eat Your Pancreas	February 7, 2019	—N/a	Anime	ABC Animation	Fathom Events	108	—N/a	$33,748,006	The ninth animated film from Fathom Events.
The Lego Movie 2: The Second Part	February 2, 2019 (Regency Village Theatre); February 8, 2019 (official release)	—N/a	Computer animation/Live-action	Warner Animation Group; Rideback; Vertigo Entertainment; Animal Logic	Warner Bros. Pictures	107	$99,000,000	$192,306,508	A sequel to The Lego Movie, the 42nd animated film from Warner Bros. Pictures, the sixth animated film from Warner Animation Group and the seventh animated film from Animal Logic.
Asterix: The Secret of the Magic Potion	February 15, 2019	—N/a	Computer animation/Live-action	Groupe M6; Mikros Image	Entertainment One	81	—N/a	$46,228,353	The fifth animated film from Entertainment One. Part of the Asterix movie franchise.
Ruben Brandt, Collector	February 15, 2019	—N/a	Traditional animation	Ruben Brandt LLC	Sony Pictures Classics	94	—N/a	$587,993	The seventh animated film from Sony Pictures Classics.
Mobile Suit Gundam Narrative	February 19, 2019	—N/a	Anime	Sunrise	Fathom Events	89	—N/a	$6,126,259	The 10th animated film from Fathom Events.
How to Train Your Dragon: The Hidden World	February 9, 2019 (Regency Village Theatre); February 22, 2019 (official release)	—N/a	Computer animation	DreamWorks Animation	Universal Pictures	104	$129,000,000	$524,383,815	A sequel to How to Train Your Dragon and How to Train Your Dragon 2, the 21st animated film from Universal Pictures and the 36th animated film from DreamWorks Animation. Nominee of an Academy Award for Best Animated Feature and a Golden Globe Award for Best Animated Feature Film.
This Magnificent Cake!	March 1, 2019	—N/a	Stop motion	Beast Animation	GKIDS	45	—N/a	$7,888	The 49th animated film from GKIDS.
Fate/stay night: Heaven's Feel II. lost butterfly	March 14, 2019	—N/a	Anime	Ufotable	Fathom Events	117	—N/a	$17,296,294	A sequel to Fate/stay night: Heaven's Feel I. presage flower and the 11th animated film from Fathom Events.
Wonder Park	March 10, 2019 (Regency Village Theatre); March 15, 2019 (official release)	—N/a	Computer animation	Paramount Animation; Nickelodeon Movies; Ilion Animation Studios	Paramount Pictures	85	$100,000,000	$119,559,110	The 44th animated film from Paramount Pictures, the fourth animated film from Paramount Animation, the 15th animated film from Nickelodeon Movies and the second animated film from Ilion Animation Studios.
Made in Abyss: Journey's Dawn	March 20, 2019	—N/a	Anime	Kinema Citrus	Fathom Events	119	—N/a	$135,821	The 12th animated film from Fathom Events.
Trinity Seven: Heavens Library & Crimson Lord	March 29, 2019	—N/a	Anime	Seven Arcs Pictures	Atlas Distribution Company	60	—N/a	$15,712	A sequel to Trinity Seven the Movie: The Eternal Library and the Alchemist Girl and the first animated film from Atlas Distribution Company.
Missing Link	April 7, 2019 (Regal Cinema Battery Park); April 12, 2019 (original release)	—N/a	Stop motion	Annapurna Pictures; Laika	United Artists	94	$102,300,000	$26,565,710	The seventh animated film from United Artists, the second animated film from Annapurna Pictures and the sixth animated film from Laika. Nominee of an Academy Award for Best Animated Feature and winner of a Golden Globe Award for Best Animated Feature Film.
Penguin Highway	April 12, 2019	—N/a	Anime	Studio Colorido	Eleven Arts	118	—N/a	$4,006,647	The 25th animated film from Eleven Arts.
The Pilgrim's Progress	April 18, 2019	—N/a	Computer animation	Cat in the Mill Studio	Fathom Events	113	—N/a	$3,173,282	The 13th animated film from Fathom Events.
Okko's Inn	April 22, 2019	—N/a	Anime	DLE; Madhouse	GKIDS	94	—N/a	$317,547	The 50th animated film from GKIDS.
Ploey: You Never Fly Alone	April 26, 2019	—N/a	Computer animation	GunHill	Viva Pictures	83	—N/a	$6,146,292	The sixth animated film from Viva Pictures.
UglyDolls	April 27, 2019 (Regal Cinemas L.A.); May 3, 2019 (official release)	—N/a	Computer animation	Reel FX Animation Studios; Alibaba Pictures; Troublemaker Studios	STX Entertainment	87	$45,000,000	$32,450,241	The second animated film from STX Entertainment and the third animated film from Reel FX Animation Studios.
Code Geass Lelouch of the Re;surrection	May 5, 2019	—N/a	Anime	Sunrise	Applause Entertainment	114	—N/a	$9,975,704	The first animated film from Applause Entertainment.
Detective Pikachu	May 2, 2019 (Times Square); May 10, 2019 (official release)	—N/a	Computer animation/Live-action	Legendary Pictures; The Pokémon Company	Warner Bros. Pictures	104	$150,000,000	$433,005,346	The ninth Warner Bros. animated film with live action and the second animated film from Legendary Pictures.
Saga of Tanya the Evil: The Movie	May 16, 2019	—N/a	Anime	NUT	Fathom Events	115	—N/a	$288,460	The 14th animated film from Fathom Events.
The Secret Life of Pets 2	June 2, 2019 (Westwood Village Theatre); June 7, 2019 (official release)	—N/a	Computer animation	Illumination	Universal Pictures	86	$80,000,000	$430,051,293	A sequel to The Secret Life of Pets, the 22nd animated film from Universal Pictures and the 10th animated film from Illumination.
Funan	June 7, 2019	—N/a	Traditional animation	Les Films d'ici Sébastien Onomo; BAC Films	GKIDS	86	—N/a	$15,152	The 51st animated film from GKIDS.
Toy Story 4	June 8, 2019 (Disney's Hollywood Studios); June 11, 2019 (El Capitan Theatre); June 21, 2019 (official release)	—N/a	Computer animation	Walt Disney Pictures; Pixar Animation Studios	Walt Disney Studios Motion Pictures	100	$200,000,000	$1,073,394,593	A sequel to Toy Story, Toy Story 2 and Toy Story 3, and the 21st animated film from Pixar Animation Studios. Winner of an Academy Award for Best Animated Feature and nominee of a Golden Globe Award for Best Animated Feature Film.
Sound! Euphonium: The Movie – Our Promise: A Brand New Day	July 11, 2019	—N/a	Anime	Kyoto Animation	Fathom Events	100	—N/a	$2,403,030	The 15th animated film from Fathom Events.
The Lion King	July 9, 2019 (Dolby Theatre); July 19, 2019 (official release)	—N/a	Computer animation/Live-action	Walt Disney Pictures; Fairview Entertainment	Walt Disney Studios Motion Pictures	118	$250,000,000	$1,657,870,986	A remake of The Lion King and the 15th Disney animated film with live-action. Nominee of a Golden Globe Award for Best Animated Feature Film.
Is It Wrong to Try to Pick Up Girls in a Dungeon?: Arrow of the Orion	July 23, 2019	—N/a	Anime	J.C.Staff	Fathom Events	82	—N/a	$338,632	The 16th animated film from Fathom Events.
Leo Da Vinci: Mission Mona Lisa	August 2, 2019	—N/a	Computer animation	Gruppo Alcuni	Ammo Content	85	—N/a	$2,593,330	The first animated film from Ammo Content.
Love Live! Sunshine!! The School Idol Movie Over the Rainbow	August 5, 2019	—N/a	Anime	Sunrise	Funimation Entertainment	100	—N/a	$7,733,048	The 14th animated film from Funimation Entertainment.
The Angry Birds Movie 2	August 10, 2019 (Regency Village Theatre); August 13, 2019 (official release)	Hair Love	Computer animation	Columbia Pictures; Sony Pictures Animation; Rovio Animation	Sony Pictures Releasing	97	$65,000,000	$147,792,047	A sequel to The Angry Birds Movie, the 29th animated film from Columbia Pictures and the 18th animated film from Sony Pictures Animation.
Cold Case Hammarskjöld	August 16, 2019	—N/a	Traditional animation/Live action	Magnolia Pictures		124	—N/a	$104,965	The second animated film from Magnolia Pictures.
Buñuel in the Labyrinth of the Turtles	August 16, 2019	—N/a	Traditional animation	Sygnatia; The Glow; Submarine	GKIDS	80	—N/a	$185,675	The 52nd animated film from GKIDS.
Ne Zha	August 29, 2019	—N/a	Computer animation	Chengdu Coco Cartoon	Well Go USA Entertainment	110	$20,000,000	$726,063,471	The first animated film from Well Go USA Entertainment.
Another Day of Life	September 13, 2019	—N/a	Rotoscoping	Platige Image; Kanaki Films	GKIDS	85	$9,357,964	$134,801	The 53rd animated film from GKIDS.
Promare	September 17, 2019	—N/a	Anime	Studio Trigger; XFLAG; Sanzigen	GKIDS	111	—N/a	$9,467,336	The 54th animated film from GKIDS.
Abominable	September 7, 2019 (TIFF); September 27, 2019 (official release)	—N/a	Computer animation	DreamWorks Animation; Pearl Studio	Universal Pictures	97	$75,000,000	$179,365,113	The 23rd animated film from Universal Pictures and the 37th animated film from DreamWorks Animation.
Rascal Does Not Dream of a Dreaming Girl	October 2, 2019	—N/a	Anime	CloverWorks	Funimation Entertainment	89	—N/a	$3,061,268	The 15th animated film from Funimation Entertainment.
The Addams Family	October 6, 2019 (Westfield Century City AMC); October 11, 2019 (official release)	—N/a	Computer animation	Metro-Goldwyn-Mayer; Bron Studios; The Jackal Group; Cinesite Studios; Nitrogen Studios	United Artists	86	$24,000,000	$203,761,873	The eighth animated film from United Artists and the ninth animated film from Metro-Goldwyn-Mayer.
One Piece: Stampede	October 24, 2019	—N/a	Anime	Toei Animation	Funimation Entertainment	101	—N/a	$81,562,741	The 16th animated film from Funimation Entertainment.
Arctic Dogs	November 1, 2019	—N/a	Computer animation	AMBI Media Group; AIC Studios; Assemblage Entertainment; Iervolino Entertainment	Entertainment Studios	93	$50,000,000	$9,879,871	The first animated film from Entertainment Studios and the third animated film from Assemblage Entertainment.
KonoSuba: God's Blessing on This Wonderful World! Legend of Crimson	November 12, 2019	—N/a	Anime	J.C.Staff	Fathom Events	90	—N/a	$5,078,942	The 17th animated film from Fathom Events.
White Snake	November 15, 2019	—N/a	Computer animation	Light Chaser Animation Studios	GKIDS	99	$11,200,000	$61,631,776	The 55th animated film from GKIDS.
Frozen 2	November 7, 2019 (Dolby Theatre); November 22, 2019 (official release)	—N/a	Computer animation	Walt Disney Pictures; Walt Disney Animation Studios	Walt Disney Studios Motion Pictures	103	$150,000,000	$1,450,026,933	A sequel to Frozen and the 58th animated film from Walt Disney Animation Studios. Nominee of a Golden Globe Award for Best Animated Feature Film.
Playmobil: The Movie	December 6, 2019	—N/a	Computer animation	Method Animation; DMG Entertainment	STX Entertainment	99	$72,000,000	$16,349,303	The third animated film from STX Entertainment.
Spies in Disguise	December 4, 2019 (El Capitan Theatre); December 25, 2019 (official release)	—N/a	Computer animation	20th Century Fox Animation; Blue Sky Studios; Chernin Entertainment	20th Century Fox	102	$100 million	$171,616,764	The 43rd animated film from 20th Century Fox, the 17th animated film from 20th Century Fox Animation, the 13th and last animated film from Blue Sky Studios before their closure in 2021, the first Fox film to be released after being acquired by Disney and the last animated film released under the 20th Century Fox name.

== See also ==
- List of animated feature films released theatrically in the United States (1937–1999)
- List of animated feature films released theatrically in the United States (2020-present)
- List of Disney theatrical animated feature films
  - List of 20th Century Studios theatrical animated feature films
- List of Universal Pictures theatrical animated feature films
- List of Paramount Pictures theatrical animated feature films
  - List of Warner Bros. theatrical animated feature films
- List of Sony theatrical animated feature films
- List of Metro-Goldwyn-Mayer theatrical animated feature films
- List of Lionsgate theatrical animated feature films
- List of The Weinstein Company animated films
