= Melanie =

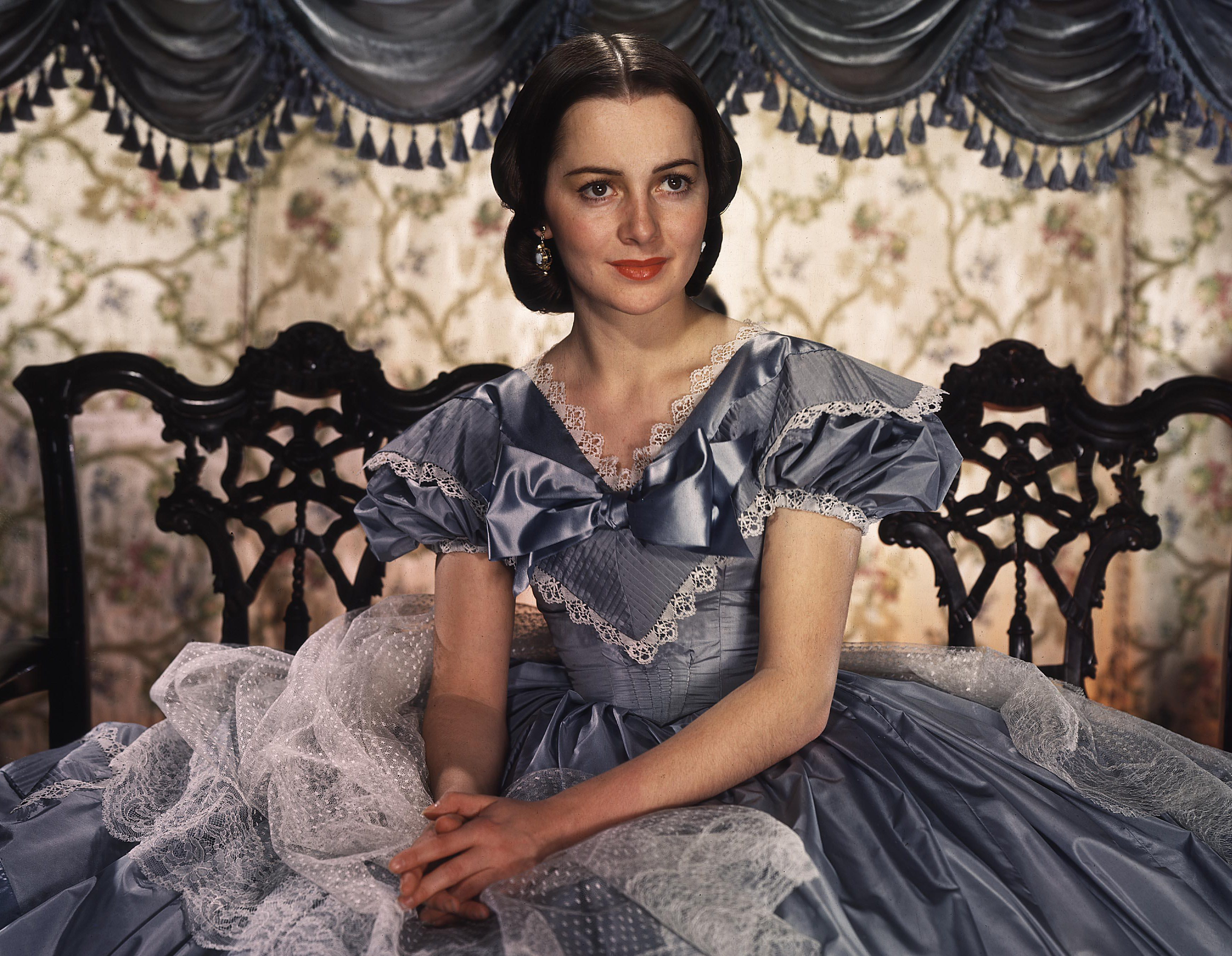
- The character Melanie Hamilton from Gone with the Wind popularized the name.
- Gender: Female
- Language: Greek

Origin
- Region of origin: Greece

Other names
- Nickname: Mel
- Related names: Melany

Melanie is a feminine given name derived from the Greek μελανία (melania), "blackness", and that from μέλας (melas), meaning "dark". Borne in its Latin form by two saints, Melania the Elder and her granddaughter Melania the Younger, the name was introduced to England by the Normans in its French form Melanie. However, the name only became common in English usage in the 1930s because of the popularity of Margaret Mitchell's 1936 novel Gone with the Wind and its 1939 film adaptation, as one of the novel's main characters was named Melanie Hamilton. The name's popularity increased until the 1970s, since remaining constant. Melanie was the 80th most popular name for girls born in the United States in 1957 and, as Mélanie, it was the 86th most popular name for girls born in France in 2004.

== People named Melanie ==
=== Female ===
- Mary Melanie Holliday (1850–1939), American Roman Catholic nun, and nurse during the American Civil War
- Melanie Abrams, American writer; former wife of writer Vikram Chandra (novelist)
- Melanie Adams (born 1969), American educator and museum administrator
- Melanie Amann (born 1978), German journalist and lawyer
- Melanie Amaro (born 1992), American singer
- Melanie Amna Abas, British psychiatric epidemiologist and professor
- Melanie Appleby (1966–1990), English singer; past member of pop duo Mel and Kim
- Melanie Arndt (born 1977), German environmental historian
- Melanie B. Jacobs, American legal scholar and administrator
- Melanie Backe-Hansen, British house historian
- Melanie Bahlo, Australian statistical geneticist and bioinformatician
- Melanie Bak (born 1994), Danish handball player
- Melanie Balcomb (born 1962), American basketball coach
- Melanie Banville (born 1987), Canadian Olympic gymnast
- Melanie Barbezat (born 1991), Swiss curler
- Melanie Barcenas (born 2007), American NWSL player
- Melanie Bartley (born 1947), British medical sociologist, and retired academic and professor
- Melanie Batkowski (born 1989), Austrian luger
- Melanie Bauschke (born 1988), German long jumper
- Melanie Becker (1966–2020), German-born American physicist and professor
- Melanie Beddie, Australian actress, director, dramaturg, and acting teacher
- Melanie Behringer (born 1985), German footballer
- Melanie Benjamin (disambiguation), several people
- Melanie Benn, American Paralympic swimmer
- Melanie Berentz (born 1999), Indonesian actress and beauty pageant titleholder
- Melanie Berger (born 1982), German politician
- Melanie Bernier (ski mountaineer) (born 1981), Canadian ski mountaineer
- Melanie Bernstein (born 1976), German politician
- Melanie Bilenker (born 1978), American craft artist
- Melanie Billings (?–2009), American murder victim
- Melanie Blake, English talent agent, columnist, and author
- Melanie Blatt (born 1975), English singer; past member of girl group All Saints
- Melanie Blokesch (born 1976), German microbiologist and professor
- Melanie Blunt, American wife of former Governor Matt Blunt
- Melanie Bolaños (born 1994), Mexican judoka
- Melanie Bonajo (born 1978), Dutch artist, filmmaker, feminist, sexological bodyworker
- Melanie Bong (born 1968), German jazz singer
- Melanie Booth (born 1984), Canadian NWSL player
- Melanie Bracewell (born 1995), New Zealand comedian, actress, and scriptwriter
- Melanie Brinkmann, German virologist
- Melanie Bromley, British-born American entertainment journalist and broadcaster
- Melanie Brown (born 1975), English singer, songwriter, dancer, television personality, and actress; past member of girl group Spice Girls
- Melanie Bruce (born 1972), English ice dancer
- Melanie Buckley (born 1982), English chess player
- Melanie Buddemeyer (born c. 1966), American competition swimmer
- Melanie Burke, New Zealand triathlete
- Melanie Calvert, British epidemiologist and professor
- Melanie Camp (born 1979), Australian-born American actress, and radio- and television presenter
- Melanie Campbell, Canadian professor of physics
- Melanie Capobianco, American mother in the Supreme Court decision Adoptive Couple v. Baby Girl
- Melanie Carpenter (1971–1995), Canadian murder victim
- Melanie Carpenter (politician), American politician
- Melanie Cervantes, Xicana artist and activist
- Melanie Challenger, British writer, researcher, and broadcaster
- Melanie Chandra (born 1986), American actress and model
- Melanie Chartoff (born 1948), American actress and comedian
- Melanie Cheng, Australian-born Hong Kong doctor and author
- Melanie Chisholm (born 1974), English singer and songwriter; past member of girl group Spice Girls
- Melanie Clarke (born 1982), English Paralympic wheelchair archer
- Melanie Clark Pullen (1975–2022), Irish actress, film producer, and writer
- Melanie Clewlow (born 1976), English field hockey player
- Melanie Cline (born 1975), American BMX racer
- Melanie Clore (born 1960), British auctioneer
- Melanie Cole (born 1968), Canadian Olympic ice dancer
- Melanie Collins, American NFL sideline reporter
- Melanie Cooper, Australian accountant; owner of brewery company Coopers Brewery
- Melanie Counsell (born 1964), Welsh filmmaker, sculptor, and installation artist
- Melanie Craft, American romance novelist; former wife of businessman Larry Ellison
- Melanie Cremer (born 1970), German Olympic field hockey player
- Melanie Crump (born 1981), British professional celebrity hair- and makeup artist
- Melanie Cruise (born 1987), American professional wrestler
- Melanie Dargel (born 2005), German rhythmic gymnast
- Melanie Davies (born 1961), British physician, academic, and professor
- Melanie Dawes (born 1966), British economist and administrator
- Melanie de Lange (born 1978), Dutch Olympic short track speed skater
- Melanie Delva, Canadian Anglican reconciliation animator and archivist
- Melanie Denham (born 1981), American rugby union player and coach
- Melanie Dennison (born 1973), Australian Olympic sailor
- Melanie Díaz (born 1996), Puerto Rican table tennis player
- Melanie Diener (born 1967), German operatic- and concert soprano
- Melanie Dimantas (born 1958), Brazilian screenwriter
- Melanie Doane (born 1967), Canadian singer, songwriter, actress, and music educator
- Melanie Dodd (born 1973), Australian former Olympic swimmer
- Melanie Domaschenz (born 1983), Australian Paralympic wheelchair basketball player
- Melanie Drewery (born 1970), New Zealand children's writer, illustrator, and potter
- Melanie du Bois, South African actress and motivational speaker
- Melanie Duff (born 1961), Irish Olympic equestrian
- Melanie Durrant, Canadian singer
- Melanie Easter, English Paralympic swimmer, runner, and cyclist
- Melanie Edwards (born 1973), New Zealand former association footballer
- Melanie Einzig (born 1967), American street photographer
- Melanie Erasim (born 1983), Austrian politician
- Melanie Ester Churella, American beauty pageant titleholder
- Melanie Ethier (born 1980), Canadian missing teenager since 1996
- Melanie Eusebe (born 1977), English author and entrepreneur
- Melanie Fain (born 1958), American printmaker
- Melanie Faisst (born 1990), German ski jumper
- Melanie Faye (born 1998), American R&B musician and social media personality
- Melanie Felber (born 1991), Danish-Swiss handball player
- Melanie Fennell, British psychologist
- Melanie Field (born 1988), American actress and singer
- Melanie Fiona (born 1983), Canadian R&B singer
- Melanie Florence, Canadian author
- Melanie Fontana (born 1986), American singer, composer, and songwriter
- Melanie Forbes (born 1999), American-born Canadian soccer player
- Melanie Friend (born c. 1957), English photographer and artist
- Melanie Fronckowiak (born 1988), Brazilian actress, writer, and television host
- Melanie Fullerton (born 1962), American actress
- Melanie García (born 1990), Spanish field hockey player
- Melanie Garside-Wight (born 1979), English footballer
- Melanie Gebhardt (born 1994), German sprint canoeist
- Melanie Ghanime, Lebanese international footballer
- Melanie Gibbons (born 1978), Australian politician
- Melanie Giedroyc (born 1968), English comedian, television presenter, and actress
- Melanie Giles (born 1972), British archaeologist, academic, and professor
- Melanie Gilligan (born 1979), Canadian-born American video-, performance-, and installation artist
- Melanie Gillman, American cartoonist, illustrator, and lecturer
- Melanie Grant (born 1971), English actress, presenter, and singer
- Melanie Greally, Irish judge and lawyer
- Melanie Green (born 2001), American professional golfer
- Melanie Greene, American writer, dancer, and choreographer
- Melanie Greensmith (born 1964), Australian fashion designer and property investor
- Melanie Greter, Swiss neuroimmunologist and professor
- Melanie Griffin, Bahamian politician
- Melanie Griffith (born 1957), American actress
- Melanie Groves (born 1979), Australian international netball player
- Melanie Guile (born 1949), English-born Australian writer
- Melanie Gutteridge, English actress
- Melanie Häfliger (born 1982), Swiss retired ice hockey player and current head coach
- Melanie Hall (1970–2004), English hospital clerical officer and murder victim
- Melanie Hall (basketball) (born 1977), Australian Paralympic wheelchair basketball player
- Melanie Hamrick (born 1987), American choreographer, author, and retired ballerina
- Melanie Harris Higgins, American official and diplomat
- Melanie Harrison Okoro (born 1982), American marine estuarine and environmental scientist
- Melanie Harrold (born 1951), Irish singer-songwriter
- Melanie Hartzog, American social services administrator and former government official
- Melanie Hasler (born 1998), Swiss Olympic bobsledder
- Melanie Hauss (born 1982), Swiss professional triathlete
- Melanie Hawtin (born 1988), Canadian Paralympic wheelchair basketball player
- Melanie Haz (born 1975), Canadian professional soccer player
- Melanie Healey (born 1961), Brazilian business executive
- Melanie Hebert, American journalist
- Melanie Hernandez Calumpad, birth name of Kyla (Filipino singer) (born 1981), Filipino singer, actress, and television personality
- Melanie Hill, English actress
- Melanie Hill, English contestant on reality television series Big Brother (British TV series) series 1
- Melanie Hilton, real name of Louise Allen (born 1949), English writer of romance novels
- Melanie Hoffmann (born 1974), German Olympic footballer
- Melanie Hofmann (born 1977), Swiss dressage rider
- Melanie Hogan, Australian documentary film director and producer
- Melanie Hooper, Australian ballroom- and Latin dancer
- Melanie Horeschowsky (1901–1983), Austrian stage-, film-, and television actress
- Melanie Horsnell, Australian singer-songwriter
- Melanie Howard (born 1993), Australian rugby league footballer
- Melanie Hudson, English actress and comedian
- Melanie Hulme (born 1976), New Zealand Olympic softball player
- Melanie Huml (born 1975), German physician and politician
- Melanie Hutsell, American actress, comedian, and writer
- Melanie Iglesias (born 1987), American model, actress, and television personality
- Melanie Irons, Australian actress and community organizer
- Melanie Janine Kanaka, Sri Lankan management accounting professional and business personality
- Melanie Jans (born 1973), Canadian professional squash player
- Melanie Johnson (born 1955), English politician
- Melanie Johnson-DeBaufre, American university associate dean
- Melanie Johnston-Hollitt (born 1974), Australian astrophysicist and professor
- Melanie Jones (born 1972), English-born Australian cricket commentator and former cricketer
- Melanie Jones (swimmer) (born 1963/1964), New Zealand swimmer
- Melanie Joy (born 1966), American social psychologist, non-fiction author, and president of nonprofit advocacy group Beyond Carnism
- Melanie Jue (born 1988), Canadian CWHL player and coach
- Melanie Kahane (1910–1988), American interior designer
- Melanie Kaye/Kantrowitz (1945–2018), American essayist, poet, academic, and political activist
- Melanie Keen (born 1967), British curator
- Melanie Kent Steinhardt (1899–1952), Bohemian American painter, printmaker, and ceramicist
- Melanie Kilburn, English actress
- Melanie Killen, American developmental psychologist and university professor
- Melanie Kinnaman, American film- and stage actress
- Melanie Klaffner (born 1990), Austrian tennis player
- Melanie Klein (1882–1960), Austrian-English Jewish author and psychoanalyst
- Melanie Klement (born 1994), Dutch professional racing cyclist
- Melanie Kogler (born 1985), Austrian television- and theatre actress
- Melanie Kohn (born 1964), American former child actress
- Melanie Kok (born 1983), Canadian rower and neuroscientist
- Melanie Krahmer, American member of rock duo Sirsy
- Melanie Kraus (born 1974), German long-distance runner
- Melanie Krause (born 1985/1986), American government official
- Melanie Kreis (born 1971), German businesswoman
- Melanie Kuenrath (born 1999), Italian footballer
- Melanie Kühnemann-Grunow (born 1972), German politician
- Melanie Kurt (1879–1941), Austrian opera singer
- Melanie L. Campbell, American voting rights activist
- Melanie L. Cradle (born 1970/1971), American chief judge
- Melanie La Barrie, Trinidad and Tobago actress and singer
- Melanie Laine (born 1975), Canadian country music singer
- Melanie Lambert (born 1974), American adagio and pair skater
- Melanie LaPatin (born 1960), American professional ballroom dancer and choreographer
- Melanie La Rosa, American documentary filmmaker and professor
- Melanie Lasrich, German international footballer
- Melanie Le Brocquy (1919–2018), Irish sculptor
- Melanie Lee (born 1958), English pharmaceutical industry executive and biologist
- Melanie Leishman (born 1989), Canadian actress
- Melanie Leneghan, American candidate in the 2018 Ohio's 12th congressional district special election
- Melanie Leng, British biochemist and professor
- Melanie Leonhard (born 1977), German historian and politician
- Melanie Leslie (born 1961), American law professor, dean, trust and estates scholar, and administrator
- Melanie Leupolz (born 1994), German professional footballer
- Melanie Levesque (born 1957), American politician
- Melanie Levin, American politician
- Melanie Lewy (1823–1856), Austrian Jewish harpist
- Melanie Liburd, English actress
- Melanie Lomax (1950–2006), American civil rights lawyer
- Melanie Lubbe (born 1990), German chess player
- Melanie Lynskey (born 1977), New Zealand actress
- Melanie Maas Geesteranus (born 1970), Dutch politician and businesswoman
- Melanie Macey, American politician
- Melanie MacKay (born 1959), Canadian Olympic swimmer
- Sister Melanie Maczka (born 1943), American Roman Catholic nun
- Melanie Mader, Austrian beauty pageant contestant
- Melanie Maher (born 1987), Puerto Rican singer, model, actress, host, and event producer
- Melanie Malzahn (born 1973), German linguist and professor of Indo-European studies
- Melanie Manchot (born 1966), German photographer and visual artist
- Melanie Manion, American political scientist and professor
- Melanie Marden (born 1975), Canadian actress, model, and producer
- Melanie Margalis (born 1991), American Olympic swimmer
- Melanie Mark (born 1975), Canadian politician
- Melanie Mark-Shadbolt (born 1977/1978), New Zealand environmental sociologist
- Melanie Marnich, American television writer-producer and playwright
- Melanie Marquez (born 1964), Filipino actress and beauty queen
- Melanie Marshall (born 1982), English Olympic swimmer
- Melanie Marti (born 1986), Swiss Olympic artistic gymnast
- Melanie Martinez (actress) (born 1972), American actress
- Melanie Martinez (singer) (born 1995), American singer and songwriter
- Melanie Masson, Scottish contestant on The X Factor (British TV series) series 9
- Melanie Mathys (born 1994), Swiss canoeist
- Melanie Matthews (born 1986), Canadian Olympic softball player
- Melanie Maurer (born 1988), Swiss professional racing cyclist and duathlete
- Melanie Mayron (born 1952), American actress and director of film and television
- Melanie McCabe, British contestant on The X Factor (British TV series) series 10
- Melanie McCann (born 1989), Canadian Olympic modern pentathlete
- Melanie McFadyean (1950–2023), English journalist and lecturer
- Melanie McGrath, English non-fiction writer and crime novelist
- Melanie McGuire (born 1972), American murderer
- Melanie McLaughlin (born 1979), Australian sport presenter
- Melanie McQuaid (born 1973), Canadian triathlete
- Melanie Meier (born 1967), American politician
- Melanie Meilinger (born 1991), Austrian Olympic freestyle skier
- Melanie Melanson (born 1974), American missing teenager since 1989
- Melanie Merkosky (born 1980), Canadian actress
- Melanie Metternich-Zichy (1832–1919), Austrian aristocrat
- Melanie Mettler (born 1977), Swiss politician
- Melanie Mikoy (born 2000), American professional soccer player
- Melanie Miller (disambiguation), several people
- Melanie Mitchell, American computer scientist and professor
- Melanie Moore (disambiguation), several people
- Melanie Moreno, American actress
- Melanie Morgan (radio personality), American radio reporter and presenter
- Melanie Morgan (politician), American politician from Washington state
- Melanie Morris, Canadian Métis surgeon
- Melanie Morse MacQuarrie (1945–2005), English-born Canadian actress
- Melanie Mudry, American beauty pageant titleholder
- Melanie Müller (born 1988), German reality television personality, schlager singer, and former pornographic actress
- Melanie Müller (footballer) (born 1996), Swiss footballer
- Melanie Münch (born 1981), German singer
- Melanie Murray, Canadian novelist
- Melanie Myrand (born 1985), Canadian long-distance runner
- Melanie Nakagawa, American attorney, former government official, and current officer for Microsoft
- Melanie Nakhla (born 1988), English past member of classical crossover group All Angels
- Melanie Nathan, South African-born American attorney, mediator, equality activist, and human rights advocate
- Melanie Neef (born 1970), Scottish track and field sprinter
- Melanie Nerlich (born 1993), German politician
- Melanie Newman (born 1991), American radio- and television MLB play-by-play broadcaster and studio host
- Melanie Nicholls-King, Canadian actress
- Melanie Nocher (born 1988), Irish Olympic swimmer
- Melanie Nolan (born 1960), New Zealand-born Australian historian and university academic
- Melanie Notkin, Canadian-American author
- Melanie Oates, Canadian writer, filmmaker, and costume designer
- Melanie Oesch (born 1987), Swiss member of yodel volksmusik family group Oesch's die Dritten
- Melanie Oliver, New Zealand film editor
- Melanie Onn (born 1979), English politician
- Melanie Ooi, Australian instrumentation- and measurement engineer, and associate professor
- Melanie Oppenheimer (born 1957), Australian historian and former actress
- Melanie Oßwald (born 1976), German politician
- Melanie Ott (born 1964), German virologist and professor of medicine
- Melanie Oudin (born 1991), American professional tennis player
- Melanie Oxley, Australian musician, singer-songwriter, and primary school teacher
- Melanie Palenik (born 1966), Canadian-born American freestyle skier
- Melanie Papalia (born 1984), Canadian actress
- Melanie Pappenheim (born c. 1959), English soprano and composer
- Melanie Paschke (born 1970), German sprinter
- Melanie Penn, American Christian musician
- Melanie Peres (born 1971), German-born Israeli model, actress, and singer
- Melanie Perkins (born 1987), Australian technology entrepreneur
- Melanie Perreault (born 1968), American historian and academic administrator
- Melanie Person (born 1965), American dancer, choreographer, and educator
- Melanie Pfeifer (born 1986), German slalom canoeist
- Melanie Phillips (born 1951), English author, journalist, and publisher
- Melanie Plimmer, Trinidad and Tobago-born English lawyer and judge
- Melanie Poole, Australian director, producer, and writer
- Melanie Pullen (born 1975), American photographer
- Melanie Purkiss (born 1979), English sprinter
- Melanie Putria Dewita Sari (born 1982), Indonesian beauty queen, television host, and actress
- Melanie R. Bond, American biologist, primate scientist, and author
- Melanie Raabe (born 1981), German novelist and journalist
- Melanie Rae Thon (born 1957), American fiction writer
- Melanie Rapp Beale (born 1964), American politician
- Melanie Rauk (1905–1978), Estonian teacher and translator
- Melanie Rawn (born 1954), American author of fantasy literature
- Melanie Reay (born 1981), English professional football manager and former player
- Melanie Reid (born 1957), English disabled journalist
- Melanie Rieback (born 1978), American computer scientist
- Melanie Roach (born 1974), American Olympic weightlifter
- Melanie Robbins (born 1968), American author, podcast host, and lawyer
- Melanie Roberts (disambiguation), several people
- Melanie Robillard (born 1982), Canadian-born German Olympic curler
- Melanie Robinson, British Royal Naval Reserve officer
- Melanie Roche (born 1970), Australian Olympic softball player
- Melanie Rodriga (born 1954), New Zealand-Australian filmmaker, lecturer, and author
- Melanie Ruth Daiken (1945–2016), English conductor, composer, and music educator
- Melanie Sachs, American politician and social worker
- Melanie Safka, full name of Melanie (singer) (1947–2024), American singer-songwriter and musician
- Melanie Salomon, Australian actress
- Melanie Sanders, American contestant on American Idol season 1
- Melanie Sanford (born 1975), American chemist and university professor of chemistry
- Melanie Santos (born 1995), Portuguese Olympic triathlete
- Melanie Scheible (born 1989), American politician and attorney
- Melanie Schiff (born 1977), American photographer
- Melanie Schilling (1972–2026), Australian television personality, psychologist, and relationship coach
- Melanie Schlanger (born 1986), Australian Olympic freestyle swimmer
- Melanie Schliecker (born 1974), German Olympic handball player
- Melanie Schmidt, German computer scientist
- Melanie Schnell (born 1977), Austrian professional tennis player
- Melanie Scholtz (born 1979), South African-born American jazz singer, songwriter, composer, dancer, and visual artist
- Melanie Schwarz (born 1989), Italian luger
- Melanie Scrofano (born 1981), Canadian actress
- Melanie Sears (born 1977), English elite road cyclist, and triathlete
- Melanie Seeger (born 1977), German Olympic race walker
- Melanie Selwood, Australian politician
- Melanie Serrano (born 1989), Spanish footballer
- Melanie Shanahan (1964–2003), Australian world-folk singer-songwriter, choir director, and vocal coach
- Melanie Shatner (born 1964), American actress
- Melanie Shiraz (born 1998), Israeli beauty pageant titleholder
- Melanie Siebert, Canadian poet
- Melanie Silgardo (born 1956), Indian poet and editor
- Melanie Sisneros, American bassist
- Melanie Skillman (born 1954), American Olympic archer
- Melanie Skotnik (born 1982), French-German Olympic high jumper
- Melanie Slade, English wife of professional footballer Theo Walcott
- Melanie Sloan (born 1965), American attorney
- Melanie Sloss, Australian lawyer and Supreme Court judge
- Melanie Slowing (born 1973), Guatemalan Olympic swimmer
- Melanie Smith (disambiguation), several people
- Melanie Sojourner (born 1968), American politician
- Melanie South (born 1986), English tennis player
- Melanie Späth (born 1981), Irish racing cyclist
- Melanie Spitta (1946–2005), German Sinti filmmaker
- Melanie Stabel (born 1999), German deaf sport shooter
- Melanie Stambaugh (born 1990), American businesswoman and politician
- Melanie Stansbury (born 1979), American politician and former ecology instructor
- Melanie Stiassny (born 1953), German museum curator
- Melanie Stimmell (born 1975), American street painter and fine artist
- Melanie Stinnett, American politician
- Melanie Stokke (born 1996), Norwegian tennis player
- Melanie St-Pierre, Canadian member of indie rock band Casper Skulls
- Melanie Suessenguth (born 1984), German professional pool player
- Melanie Sumner (born 1963), American writer and college professor
- Melanie Sykes (born 1970), English television- and radio presenter
- Melanie Symons (born 1975), Australian media personality
- Melanie Szubrycht (born 1969), English international track and road racing cyclist
- Melanie Tait (born c. 1981), Australian playwright, radio presenter, screenwriter, and journalist
- Melanie Tavendale, New Zealand mayor
- Melanie Taylor Kent, American artist
- Melanie Tem (1949–2015), American horror- and dark fantasy author, and social worker
- Melanie Thaw, English adopted daughter of actor John Thaw
- Melanie Thernstrom (born 1964), American author, academic, and crime writer
- Melanie Thomas (disambiguation), several people
- Melanie Thornton (1967–2001), American singer-songwriter
- Melanie Tory, Canadian computer scientist and professor
- Melanie Townsend (1968–2018), Canadian curator and writer
- Melanie Troxel (born 1972), American drag racer
- Melanie Twitt (born 1977), Australian Olympic field hockey player
- Melanie Vallejo, Australian-born New Zealand actress
- Melanie Verwoerd (born 1967), South African-born Irish political analyst, and former diplomat and politician
- Melanie von Nagel (1908–2006), German-born American baroness, literary translator, poet, and Roman Catholic nun
- Melanie von Trapp, American past member of musical group The von Trapps
- Melanie Wade Goodwin (1970–2020), American politician
- Melanie Wakefield, Australian psychologist and behavioral researcher
- Melanie Wall (born 1971), American psychiatric biostatistician, psychometrician, mental health data scientist, and professor
- Melanie Walsh (born 1964), English writer and illustrator of children's books
- Melanie Walters (born 1962), Welsh actress
- Melanie Ward (born 1981), Scottish politician
- Melanie Watson Bernhardt (1968–2025), American actress and disability advocate
- Melanie Wegling (born 1990), German politician
- Melanie Wehbe (born 1991), Swedish singer and songwriter
- Melanie Weisner (born 1986), American professional poker player
- Melanie Welham (born 1964), British biochemist
- Melanie Wells (?–2009), American murder victim
- Melanie Whelan, American businesswoman
- Melanie White, American jewelry designer
- Melanie Wiber, Canadian economic- and legal anthropologist, and professor emerita
- Melanie Wight, Canadian politician
- Melanie Wildman (born 1974), Canadian businesswoman, entrepreneur, and beauty pageant winner
- Melanie Wilks (born 2000), Australian rugby union player
- Melanie Williams (born 1964), British singer
- Melanie Wilson (disambiguation), several people
- Melanie Windridge, British plasma physicist and science communicator
- Melanie Winiger (born 1979), Swiss actress, model, and beauty pageant titleholder
- Melanie Withnall, Australian journalist, producer, and manager
- Melanie Woering (born 1992), Dutch racing cyclist
- Melanie Wolfers (born 1971), German Roman Catholic Salvatorian nun, theologian, philosopher, and media personality
- Melanie Wood (born 1981), American mathematician and professor
- Melanie Woodin, Canadian neuroscientist and academic administrator
- Melanie Woods (born 1994), Scottish teacher and Paralympic wheelchair racer
- Melanie Woods (musician) (born 1969), English musician, singer, carpenter, joiner, and carpentry tutor
- Melanie Yazzie (born 1966), American Navajo sculptor, painter, printmaker, and professor
- Melanie Yergeau (born 1984), American autistic academic, scholar, and professor
- Melanie Zanetti (born 1985), Australian actress

=== Male ===
- Melanie Martinsson, real name of Melanie is demented, Swedish electro punk rock artist

== People named Mélanie ==
Mélanie is a feminine French given name. Notable people with the name include:

- Mélanie Astles (born 1982), English-born French aviator
- Mélanie Bardis (born 1986), French weightlifter
- Mélanie Bauer (born 1970), French radio- and television presenter
- Mélanie Berger-Volle (born 1921), Austrian-born French veteran
- Mélanie Berliet, American author and journalist
- Mélanie Bernier (born 1985), French actress
- Mélanie Blouin (born 1990), Canadian pole vaulter
- Mélanie Bonis (1858–1937), French composer
- Mélanie Briche (born 1975), French footballer
- Mélanie Calvat (1831–1904), French Roman Catholic nun
- Mélanie Carrier (born 1979), Canadian documentary filmmaker
- Mélanie Charbonneau, Canadian film director and screenwriter
- Mélanie Clément (born 1992), French judoka
- Mélanie Cohl (born 1982), Belgian singer
- Mélanie Coste (born 1976), French adult film actress
- Mélanie Couzy (born 1990), French Olympic sports shooter
- Mélanie De Biasio (born 1978), Belgian jazz singer, flutist, and composer
- Mélanie de Comoléra (1789–1854), French flower painter
- Mélanie de Jesus dos Santos (born 2000), French artistic gymnast
- Mélanie Demers, Canadian dancer and choreographer
- Mélanie de Pourtalès (1836–1914), French salonnière and courtier
- Mélanie de Salignac (1741–1763), French blind musician
- Mélanie Disdier (born 1974), French politician
- Mélanie Doutey, French actress
- Mélanie Engoang (born 1968), Gabonese judoka and coach
- Mélanie Fazi (born 1976), French novelist and translator of fantasy fiction
- Mélanie Gaubil (born 1997), French Olympic archer
- Mélanie Georgiades, birth name of Diam's (born 1980), Cypriot-born French Muslim and retired rapper
- Mélanie Gloria (born 1987), Canadian professional tennis player
- Mélanie Gouby, French investigative journalist, writer, and documentary filmmaker
- Mélanie Gourarier, French social anthropologist
- Mélanie Hahnemann (1800–1878), French homeopathic physician
- Mélanie Henique (born 1992), French competitive swimmer
- Mélanie Joly (born 1979), Canadian politician and lawyer
- Mélanie Komzo, Republic of the Congo politician
- Mélanie Laurent (born 1983), French actress, filmmaker, and singer
- Mélanie Lipinska (1865–1933), Polish-French blind physician
- Mélanie Marois (born 1984), Canadian professional tennis player
- Mélanie Meillard (born 1998), Swiss alpine ski racer
- Mélanie Ougier (born 1984), French luger
- Mélanie Pain, French indie pop singer and songwriter
- Mélanie Paquin, Canadian beauty pageant titleholder
- Mélanie Renaud (1981–2024), Haitian-born Canadian singer-songwriter and stage actress
- Mélanie René (born 1990), Swiss singer and songwriter
- Mélanie Rocan (born 1980), Canadian artist
- Mélanie Sonhaye Kombate, Togolese human- and women's rights activist
- Mélanie Suchet (born 1976), French Olympic alpine skier
- Mélanie Thierry (born 1981), French actress, model, film director, and screenwriter
- Mélanie Thomas, American past member of global pop group Now United
- Mélanie Thomin (born 1984), French politician and former teacher
- Mélanie Turgeon (born 1976), Canadian skier
- Mélanie Vogel (born 1985), French academic and politician
- Mélanie Watt (born 1975), Canadian children's author and illustrator

== Fictional characters ==
- Melanie, in the 1982 Canadian drama film Melanie, played by Glynnis O'Connor
- Melanie Barnett, in the US comedy-drama TV series The Game, played by Tia Mowry
- Melanie Beeby, in the UK teen novel series Angels Unlimited
- Melanie Brodie, in the Canadian teen drama TV franchise Degrassi, played by Sara Ballingall
- Melanie Burton, in the UK soap opera Hollyoaks, played by Cassie Powney
- Melanie Bush, in the UK science fiction TV series Doctor Who, played by Bonnie Langford
- Melanie Carmichael, in the 2002 US romantic comedy film Sweet Home Alabama
- Melanie Costello, in the UK soap opera Family Affairs, played by Rebecca Hunter
- Melanie Cross, in the US science fiction mystery drama TV series Under the Dome, played by Grace Victoria Cox
- Melanie Daniels, in the 1963 US natural horror film The Birds, played by Tippi Hedren
- Melanie Darrow, in the 1997 US TV film Melanie Darrow, played by Delta Burke
- Melanie Doland, in the UK TV soap opera Emmerdale, played by Caroline Strong
- Melanie Hamilton, in the 1936 US novel Gone with the Wind, played by Olivia de Havilland in the 1939 epic historical romance film
- Melanie Hart, in the UK soap opera Family Affairs, played by Cordelia Bugeja
- Melanie Hawkins, in the US police procedural sitcom TV series Brooklyn Nine-Nine, played by Gina Gershon
- Melanie Hope Moretti, in the US TV sitcom Hot in Cleveland, played by Valerie Bertinelli
- Melanie Jonas, in the US TV soap opera Days of Our Lives, played by Molly Burnett
- Melanie Kirk, in the New Zealand prime-time soap opera Shortland Street, played by Tina Regtien and Julie Crean
- Melanie MacIver, in the US soap opera One Life to Live, played by Darlene Vogel
- Melanie Marcus, in the 2000 US/Canadian drama TV series Queer as Folk, played by Michelle Clunie
- Melanie Owen, in the UK TV soap opera EastEnders, played by Tamzin Outhwaite
- Melanie Pearson, in the Australian TV soap opera Neighbours, played by Lucinda Cowden
- Melanie Porter, in the 2008 American family comedy film College Road Trip, played by Raven-Symoné
- Melanie Puckett, in the US TV sitcom iCarly, played by Jennette McCurdy
- Melanie Schopp-Cale, in the 2013 US political action thriller film White House Down, played by Rachelle Lefevre
- Melanie Stryder, in the 2008 science fiction romance novel The Host, played by Saoirse Ronan in the 2013 US romantic science fiction thriller film
- Melanie Thomas (EastEnders), in the UK TV soap opera EastEnders, played by Ava Healy

== See also ==
- Melania
- Mélanie (album), album by Céline Dion
