= DINK =

Family lifestyle

"DINK" is an acronym that stands for Double Income No Kids, referring to a couple in which both partners earn an income and have no children. The term describes a household's income structure and parental status, regardless of whether the absence of children is voluntary or involuntary. With two incomes and no child-rearing expenses, DINK households may have greater disposable income than comparable households with children. The term emerged in the United States during the rise of yuppie culture in the 1980s. The Great Recession solidified this social trend, as more couples waited longer to have children or chose not to have children at all.

== Variations ==
DINKY means "Double Income No Kids yet", implying that the couple in question is childless only temporarily and intends to have children later, rather than eschewing having children entirely. The British radio sitcom Double Income, No Kids Yet bore this name.

GINK means "green inclinations, no kids", referring to those who choose not to have children for environmental reasons.

DINKWAD means "Double Income No Kids, with a dog".

Some marketers have proposed "yappie" ("young affluent parent", adapted from "yuppie") as a term to describe similar couples who do have children.

== See also ==
- Doug, a TV series featuring recurring characters Bud and Tippi Dink, their surname being a reference to the acronym
- Emerging adulthood
- FIRE movement
- Total fertility rate
- Childlessness
- Melanie Notkin, originator of the acronym PANK, "professional aunt, no kids"
