= Melanie Janine =

Melanie Janine may refer to:

- Mel B also known as Melanie Janine Brown (born 1975), English singer
- Melanie Janine Kanaka, Sri Lankan accountant
