= Melanie Amna Abas =

British psychiatric epidemiologist

- Education: University of Auckland; University of Birmingham
- Scientific career
- Workplaces: Institute of Psychiatry, Psychology and Neuroscience; King's Global Health Institute
- Thesis: Socio-economic deprivation and length of psychiatric inpatient stay (2003)

Melanie Amna Abas is a British psychiatric epidemiologist who is Professor of Global Mental Health at the Institute of Psychiatry, Psychology and Neuroscience and Director of the King's Global Health Institute at King's College London. She is also a consultant psychiatrist at the South London and Maudsley NHS Foundation Trust and a member of the Zimbabwe College of Psychiatrists

Her research focuses on improving access to effective mental health care, particularly for depression and anxiety, in low-resource settings. This has included developing and evaluating psychological interventions that can be delivered by non-specialists in primary and community care. Much of her work has been conducted in sub-Saharan Africa, including Zimbabwe, as well as in the United Kingdom.

== Early life and education ==
Abas attended Ysgol David Hughes in North Wales and studied medicine at the University of Birmingham. She became a Member of the Royal College of Physicians before specialising in psychiatry. Two years of her training as a psychiatrist was at Harare Hospital, Zimbabwe. She later completed an MSc in Epidemiology at the London School of Hygiene & Tropical Medicine and a doctorate at the University of Auckland in 2003, where her research examined associations between socioeconomic deprivation and mental health outcomes.

== Research ==
Abas is well known for establishing conclusive evidence, with Dixon Chibanda and others, on the effectiveness of the low-cost 'Friendship Bench' talking therapy for depression, which has made a global impact. The Friendship Bench is a globally recognized, evidence-based mental health intervention that uses trained community ''grandmothers'' to deliver problem-solving therapy. Originating in Zimbabwe, the intervention has been associated with reductions in symptoms of depression and has been implemented in multiple countries, including the United States and the United Kingdom. It has also been described as a cost-effective approach to addressing gaps in mental health care in low-resource settings. Together with Dixon Chibanda, she co-directs the African Youth in Mind programme, which adapts the Friendship Bench intervention for young people, and is now moving into digital tools for depression.

She is also recognised for improving mental health among trafficked persons. Her research with the PROTECT team informed UK policy changes and NHS training to support survivors of human trafficking and modern slavery.

Abas has brought together a team of clinicians, researchers and implementers who focus on integrating mental health into care for people living with HIV, especially in countries with high HIV burden. Together they have contributed to international policy, and also developed the TENDAI intervention for improving depression and medication adherence.

Her earlier research examined the social determinants of depression among women in Zimbabwe. She has been credited with helping to 'bust the myth' that depression does not occur in people in poorer countries.

== Career ==
Abas has held academic and clinical roles at King's College London and the South London and Maudsley NHS Foundation Trust since 2008. She served as Deputy Director of the Centre for Global Mental Health, a joint initiative between King's College London and the London School of Hygiene & Tropical Medicine.

In 2023, she was appointed Director of the King's Global Health Institute.

== Academic service ==
Abas co-founded the MSc in Global Mental Health, taught jointly between King's College London and the London School of Hygiene & Tropical Medicine. Her work has been characterised by building capacity in groups classically under-represented in academia, for example by contributing to African-led research and training programmes such as the US–African Medical Education Partnership Initiative and the African Mental Health Research Initiative (AMARI).. capacity building amongst African researchers. As Director of the King's Global Health Institute she is leading strategy on equitable partnerships and nurturing early career researchers.

== Personal life ==
Abas is of British and Pakistani heritage. She is married and has three children. Her father, Syed Jan Abas, was a mathematician.

== Selected publications ==
- Daruwalla, Nayreen; Abas, Melanie; Ahmad, Ayesha (2025). Developing a mental health support package for women survivors of domestic violence and modern slavery in South Asia. Vol. 1. National Institute for Health and Care Research. pp. 1–28. doi:10.3310/DHSU8843. PMID 41442533.
- Sodi, Tholene; Abas, Melanie Amna; Abdulaziz, Mohammed (2024). "A research agenda for mental health in sub-Saharan Africa". Nature Medicine. 30 (3): 616–617. doi:10.1038/s41591-023-02779-6. PMID 38355971.
- Abas, Melanie Amna; Mangezi, Walter; Nyamayaro, Primrose C. (2022). "Task-sharing with lay counsellors to deliver a stepped care intervention to improve depression, antiretroviral therapy adherence, and viral suppression in people living with HIV: Study protocol for the TENDAI randomised controlled trial". BMJ Open. 12 (12) e057844. doi:10.1136/bmjopen-2021-057844. PMC 9723911. PMID 36576191.
- Remien, Robert H.; Patel, Vikram; Chibanda, Dixon; Abas, Melanie Amna (2021). "Integrating mental health into HIV prevention and care: a call to action". Journal of the International AIDS Society. 24 (S2) e25748. doi:10.1002/jia2.25748. PMC 8222846. PMID 34164925.
- Okewole, Halima; Merritt, Christopher; Mangezi, Walter; Abas, Melanie (2020). "Building career development skills for researchers: a qualitative study across four African countries". Annals of Global Health. 86 (1): 40. doi:10.5334/aogh.2759. PMC 7164382. PMID 32322538.
- Chibanda, Dixon; Weiss, Helen A.; Verhey, Ruth; Abas, Melanie Amna (2016). "Effect of a primary care-based psychological intervention on symptoms of common mental disorders in Zimbabwe: a randomized clinical trial". JAMA. 316 (24): 2618–2626. doi:10.1001/jama.2016.19102. PMID 28027368.
- Oram, Sian; Abas, Melanie; Bick, Debra E. (2016). "Human trafficking and health: a survey of male and female survivors in England". American Journal of Public Health. 106 (6): 1073–1078. doi:10.2105/AJPH.2016.303095. PMC 4880235. PMID 27077341.
