= Melanija =

Melanija is a female given name, a variant of Melanie.

Notable people with this given name include:

- Melanija Bugarinović (1905–1986), Serbian opera singer
- Melānija Vanaga (1905–1997), Latvian writer and journalist
- Melania Trump (born 1970), born Melanija Knavs, current First Lady of the United States, since 2025, and also from 2017 to 2021

== See also ==
- Melanie
- Melania
