= Backe (surname) =

Backe is a surname. Notable people with the surname include:

- Brandon Backe (born 1978), American professional baseball pitcher
- Hasse Backe (born 1952), Swedish footballer and manager
- Herbert Backe (1896–1947), German Nazi politician
- Melanie Backe-Hansen, British house historian
- Moa Backe Åstot (born 1998), Swedish Sámi author
- Rutger Backe (born 1951), Swedish footballer and manager (Varbergs BoIS)
