= Mel Miller =

Mel Miller may refer to:

- Mel Miller (politician)
- Mel Miller (comedian)

== See also ==
- Melanie Miller (disambiguation)
