= Melania =

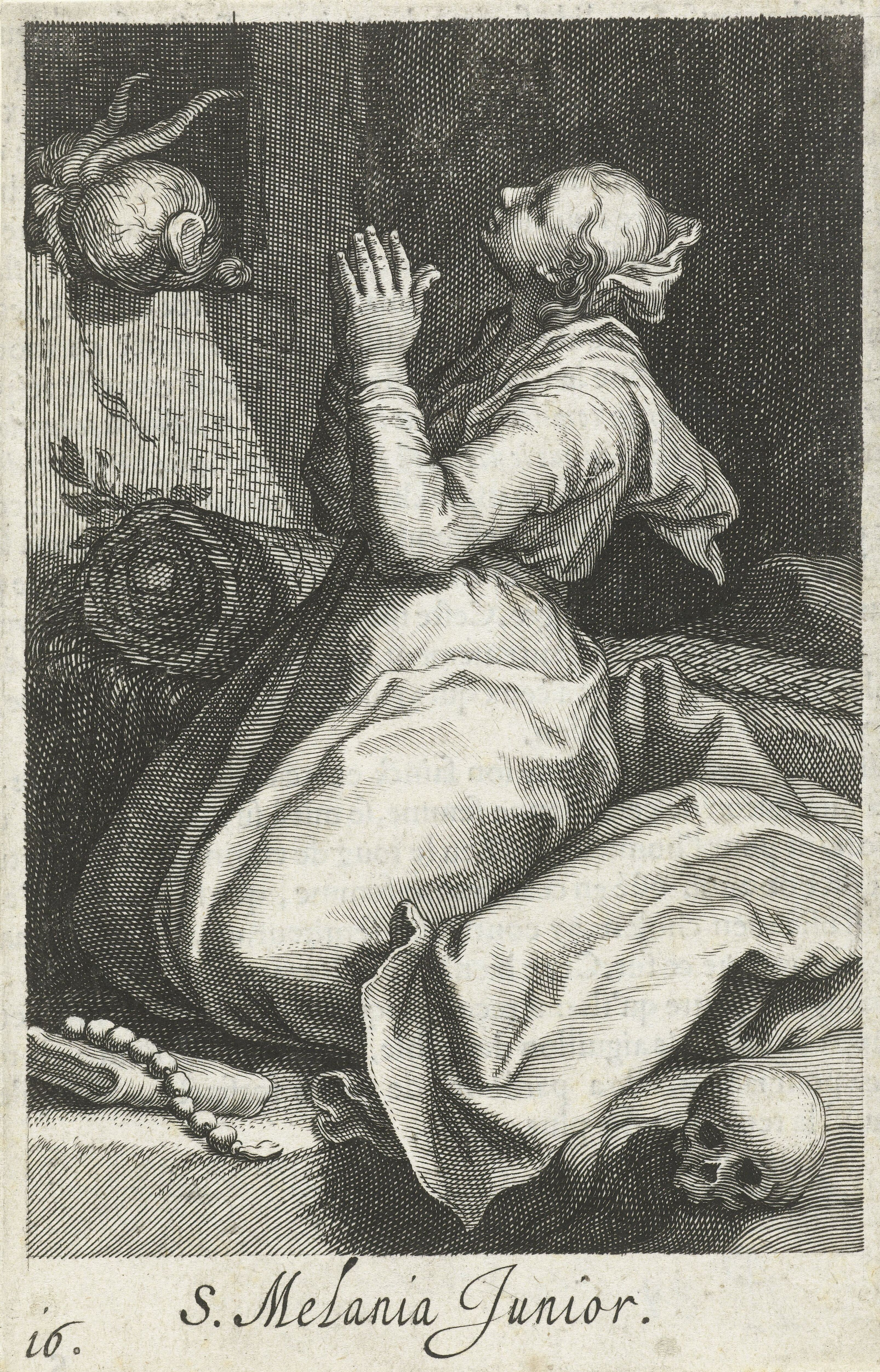
Saint Melania the Younger by Boetius à Bolswert after Abraham Bloemaert, c. 1605

Melania is a feminine given name of Latin origin that derives from the Greek word melaina (μέλαινα), the feminine form of the adjective melas (μέλας) meaning "black" or "dark". The name was borne by the two saints Melania the Elder and her granddaughter Melania the Younger, and was the origin of the name Melanie. People named Melania include:

- Melania the Elder (350–410), a Christian saint and an influential figure in the ascetic movement
- Melania the Younger (383–439), a Christian saint who lived during the reign of Emperor Flavius Augustus Honorius
- Melania Alvarez, Mexican mathematics educator in Canada
- Melania "Melani" Costa (born 1989), Spanish swimmer
- Melania Cristescu, Romanian–Canadian biologist
- Melania Gabbiadini (born 1983), Italian former footballer
- Melania Grego (born 1973), Italian former water polo player
- Melania Hotu (born 1959), provincial governor of Rapa Nui (Easter Island)
- Melania Mazzucco (born 1966), Italian author
- Melania Rodríguez (born 2001), Spanish trampolinist
- Melania Tartabull (born 1955), Cuban volleyball player
- Melania Trump (born 1970), Slovene-American model and First Lady of the United States from 2017 to 2021 and since 2025
- Melania Ursu (1940–2016), Romanian stage and film actress

== See also ==
- Melanie
- Mélanie
- Melanija
- Malenia, character in the video game Elden Ring
- Melaina, a Corycian nymph in Greek mythology
