= Jane Schaberg =

American biblical scholar

- Born: Jane Dewar Schaberg; February 20, 1938; St. Louis, Missouri, US
- Died: April 17, 2012 (aged 74); Detroit, Michigan, US

Academic background
- Education: Manhattanville College; Columbia University; Union Theological Seminary
- Thesis: The Father, the Son, and the Holy Spirit (1980)
- Influences: Virginia Woolf

Academic work
- Discipline: Biblical studies; religious studies; women's studies
- Sub-discipline: New Testament studies
- School or tradition: Christian feminism
- Institutions: University of Detroit Mercy
- Notable works: The Illegitimacy of Jesus (1987); The Resurrection of Mary Magdalene (2002)

Jane Dewar Schaberg (February 20, 1938 – April 17, 2012) was an American biblical scholar who served as Professor of Religious Studies and of Women's Studies at the University of Detroit Mercy from 1977 through 2009.

== Life ==
Born in 1938, Schaberg earned a BA in philosophy from Manhattanville College, an MA in systematic theology from Columbia University, and a PhD in biblical studies from Union Theological Seminary. In 1974 she was elected a member of the Catholic Biblical Association.

Schaberg's publications deal mainly with the New Testament, including a commentary on the New Testament Infancy Narratives, on the Gospel of Luke, and on feminist contributions to historical and literary research. She also wrote poetry although her poetry is not widely published. Her later research was on the traditions and legends associated with the figure of Mary Magdalene, as seen through a feminist lens. Schaberg's sometimes controversial work, especially the 1987 publication of The Illegitimacy of Jesus: A Feminist Theological Interpretation of the Infancy Narratives, has been discussed in Newsweek, Time, The New Yorker, Cross Currents, and the Detroit Free Press. Schaberg's automobile was set on fire in response to this book.

At one time a professed member of the Society of the Sacred Heart of Jesus (a religious community of Roman Catholic women), Schaberg renounced her vows while teaching at the University of Detroit Mercy, and in 1984 was one of 97 theologians and religious persons who signed A Catholic Statement on Pluralism and Abortion, calling for religious pluralism and discussion within the Catholic Church regarding the church's position on abortion.

She was chosen for the Distinguished Faculty Award in 2006, she was acknowledged as professor emerita of Religious Studies in 2011 following her retirement. She died at her home in Detroit April 17, 2012, at the age of 74 after a long illness.

== Works ==
=== Thesis ===
- Schaberg, Jane (1970). The God-Forsakenness of Jesus (MA thesis). New York, NY: Columbia University.
- ——— (1980). The Father, the Son, and the Holy Spirit: the triadic phrase in Matthew 28:19b (PhD thesis). Union Theological Seminary.

=== Books ===
- ——— (1981). The Father, the Son, and the Holy Spirit : the triadic phrase in Matthew 28:19b. Dissertation series - Society of Biblical Literature. Vol. 61. Chico, CA: Scholars Press. ISBN 9780891305439. OCLC 7796028. - general publication of the author's 1980 thesis
- ——— (1987). The Illegitimacy of Jesus: a feminist theological interpretation of the infancy narratives. San Francisco: Harper & Row. ISBN 9780062546883. OCLC 15488706.
- ——— (2002). The Resurrection of Mary Magdalene: legends, apocrypha and the Christian testament. London: Continuum. ISBN 9780826413833. OCLC 48989326.
- ———; Johnson-DeBaufre, Melanie (2006). Mary Magdalene understood. London: Continuum. ISBN 9780826418982. OCLC 71350371.
- ——— (2012). The Death and Resurrection of the Author and other feminist essays on the Bible. The Bible in the Modern World. Vol. 51. Sheffield: Sheffield Phoenix Press. ISBN 9781907534737. OCLC 843459621.

=== Edited by ===
- ———; Bach, Alice; Fuchs, Esther, eds. (2004). On the Cutting Edge: the study of women in biblical worlds: essays in honor of Elisabeth Schüssler Fiorenza. London: Continuum. ISBN 978-0-8264-1582-0.
