= Katelyn Zach =

American politician

Member-elect of the Missouri House of Representatives from the 133rd district
- Assuming office January 2027
- Succeeding: Melanie Stinnett

Personal details
- Party: Democratic

Katelyn Zach is an American politician. A member of the Democratic Party, she is the member-elect for the 133rd district of the Missouri House of Representatives.
