= Annie Dalton =

British children's author

- Born: 18 January 1948; Dorset, England
- Died: 6 January 2025 (aged 76)
- Occupation: Novelist
- Writing career
- Notable works: Afterdark series, Agent Angel series, The Oxford Dog Walking Thrillers

Annie Dalton (born 18 January 1948) is a British children's author, perhaps best known for writing the Agent Angel series, formerly known as the Angels Unlimited series, and now retitled The Angel Academy.

== Biography ==
Annie Dalton was born in Dorset, 17 January 1948. She grew up as an only child in the English countryside during the 1950s. Her father was not always around, but when he was, he would tell her fantastic stories, often with her as the principal character. Her father left the family for good. Dalton missed him and his stories, which led her to the fantasy section at her local library, thus sparking lifelong love of fiction.

After undertaking jobs such as waitressing, cleaning and factory work, Dalton went on to study at University of Warwick and soon started writing.

Dalton now lives in Norfolk. She has three children.

== Awards and nominations ==
Dalton's books Night Maze and The Real Tilly Beany were shortlisted for the Carnegie Medal. The After Dark Princess won the Nottinghamshire Book Award, while Naming the Dark and Swan Sister were on the shortlist for the Sheffield Children's Book Award.

== Selected bibliography ==
Afterdark

- The Afterdark Princess (1990)
- The Dream Snatcher (1998)
- The Midnight Museum (2001)
- The Rules of Magic (2004)

- Out of the Ordinary (1988)
- Night Maze (1989)
- The Real Tilly Beany, the first of the Tilly Beany series (1991)
- Naming the Dark (1992)
- Swan Sister (1992)
- Winging It, the first of the Agent Angel series (2001)
- Isabel: Taking Wing from the Girls of Many Lands series (2002)
- Lilac Peabody and Sam Sparks, the first of the Lilac Peabody series (2004)
- Ferris Fleet the Wheelchair Wizard (2005)
- How To Save A Dragon Sequel to Ferris Fleet (2011)
