= Chris Lavergne =

American media strategist

- Born: Virginia
- Education: Hampshire College
- Occupations: entrepreneur, publisher

Chris Lavergne is an American media strategist and entrepreneur who founded the website Thought Catalog in 2010.

== Background ==
Born in suburban Virginia, Lavergne would later attend Hampshire College in Amherst, Massachusetts. For his senior thesis, Lavergne wanted to study the interaction between publishing, literature, audience and the business of writing, which eventually led to the idea of Thought Catalog.

== Thought Catalog ==
Lavergne registered the domain name for Thought Catalog in 2008, and began working on the site while consulting for record labels and publishing companies. Thought Catalog started publishing on February 1, 2010. By 2012, Thought Catalog was attracting 2.5 million unique visitors per month, and began to attract a large number of millennial readers, with nearly three-quarters of the site’s audience falling into the 21- to 34-year-old demographic. In July 2014 Thought Catalog was drawing more than 34 million unique visitors per month, with much of the traffic due to social sharing.

Characterizing the site, Lavergne has said, "On the most basic level, we are an experimental media website dedicated to providing great content. What defines 'great content' is and probably always will be an open question and work-in-progress, but right now one of the things we are consistently striving for is to find a balance between commercial success and quality work."

Lavergne was named to Forbes “30 Under 30” list in 2014.
