= Sister Melanie Maczka =

- Born: 1943
- Education: De Lourdes College
- Organization(s): Society of Sisters for the Church; Casa ALBA Melanie
- Known for: Service to the Hispanic Community in the Green Bay area
- Awards: Ohtli Award

Sister Melanie Maczka (born 1943) is an American nun. She is a member of the Society of Sisters for the Church and founder of Casa ALBA Melanie, a Hispanic resource center for the greater Green Bay area. She began serving the Hispanic population of Green Bay in 1982 as an associate at St. Willebrord Catholic Parish.

== Casa ALBA Melanie ==
In February 2012, after 30 years of serving the Hispanic community of Green Bay, Sister Maczka founded Casa ALBA Melanie to act "as a hub for information and referral, bringing together persons seeking assistance with service providers in the community." Casa ALBA resource center sees between 300 and 350 people each month.

Casa ALBA Melanie's name can be roughly translated from Spanish, with casa meaning "home" and alba meaning "dawn", to represent newness or hope. ALBA is also an acronym for Association de Latina Bienestar y Ayuda or Association for Latino Well-Being and Assistance. The name Melanie is used in the organization title as a tribute to the organization's first executive director, Sister Melanie Maczka, who continues to serve as director for Casa ALBA.

== Recognition ==
Sister Maczka has served on several boards of directors, including for the YWCA, Aging and Disability Resource Center, Connecting our Community of Brown County, Migration Advocacy Committee. She has also been in charge of the Leadership and Ministry Program in Spanish of the Diocese of Green Bay.

On September 15, 2015, at a ceremony held at the National Hispanic Museum of Mexican Art in Chicago, Sister Melanie received the Ohtli Award, the highest recognition awarded by the Mexican Ministry of Foreign Affairs. The consular general of Mexico, Carlos Jiménez Macías, presented her with the award, recognizing her 30 years of service to the Hispanic community. At the time Sister Melanie was honored with the Ohtli Award, Brown County, which includes the greater Green Bay area, was home to approximately 21,000 Hispanic people. Jiménez Macías wrote in a letter to Sister Melanie, "This acknowledgment honors people who have dedicated most of their lives and career to blazing a trail abroad for younger generations of Mexicans and Mexican-Americans as they strive to achieve their dreams." Nominations for this award are submitted by the Consulate General of Mexico in Chicago to the Institute for Mexicans Abroad, a program initiated by the Mexican Ministry of Foreign Affairs.
