= Cornelis van Spaendonck =

Dutch painter

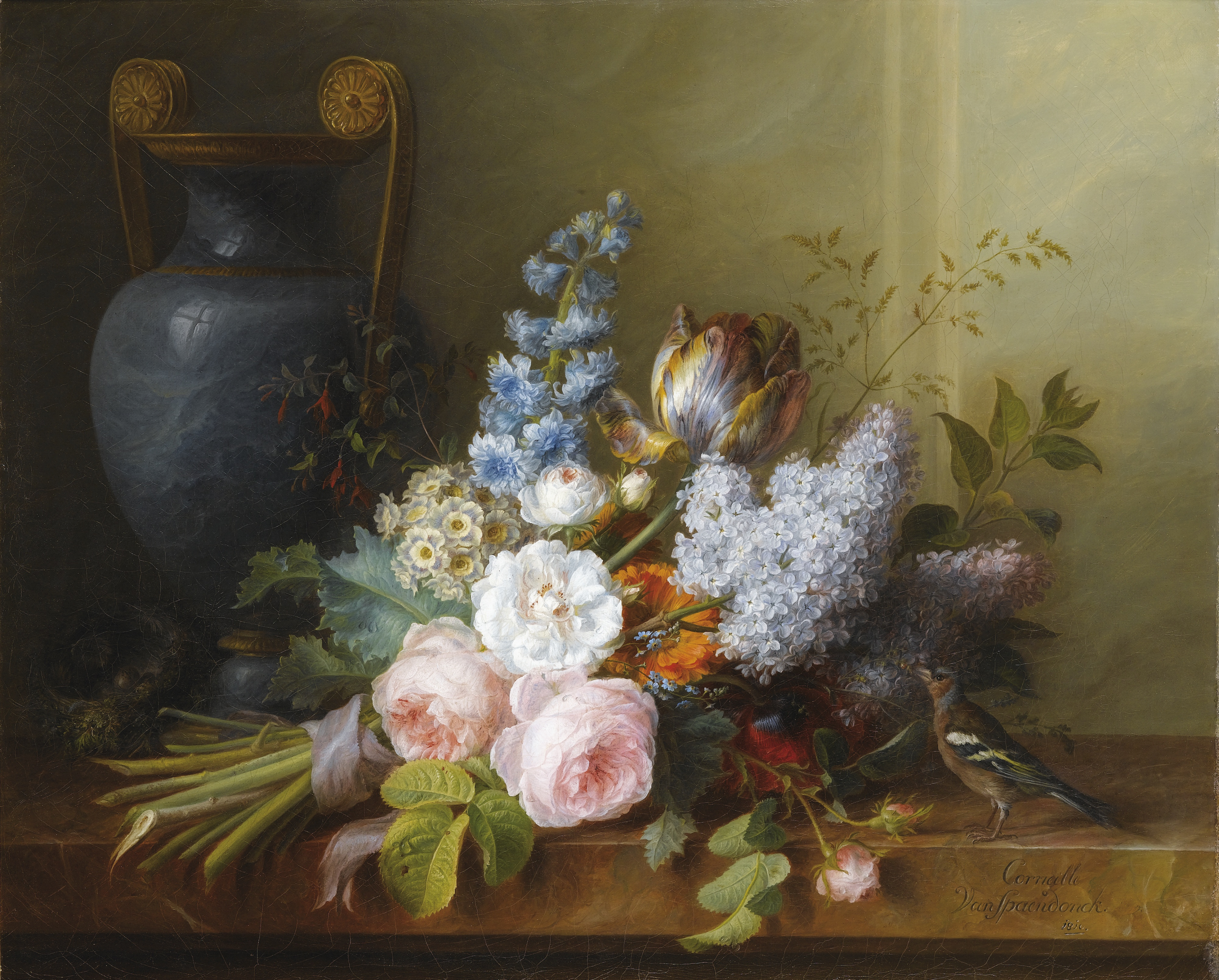
Bouquet de fleurs au nid d'oiseau by Cornelis van Spaendonck

Cornelis van Spaendonck (7 December 1756 – 22 December 1839) was a Dutch painter who was a native of Tilburg.

Spaendonck initially worked under artist Guillaume-Jacques Herreyns (1743–1827) in Antwerp, and in 1773 moved to Paris to study and work with his brother, floral painter Gérard van Spaendonck (1746–1822). From 1785 to 1800, Cornelis van Spaendonck was head of the porcelain works at Sèvres. Due to difficulties encountered as an administrator, he was relieved of his directorship in 1800, but remained at Sèvres as a designer and artist until 1808. Mélanie de Comoléra was his pupil.

In 1789 Spaendonck became a member of the Académie des Beaux Arts. He painted throughout his lifetime, displaying his works in the salons of Paris until 1833. Most of Spaendonck's works were created with oils and gouache, and he is remembered for his lush still-lifes of flowers. Among his paintings were subjects such as De Fleurs Et Fruits, Vase De Fleurs, Bouquet De Different Fleurs, Fleurs Du Jardin, Corbeille Fleurs, et al.

At the time of his death in 1840 there were 29 paintings in his studio, works that were auctioned soon afterwards.
