= Mélanie Sonhaye Kombate =

Born in Togo, Mélanie Sonhaye Kombate is a Togolese human rights and women's rights defender. She is the Advocacy and Programs Director at West African Human Rights Defenders Network (WARHRDN).

In 2018 Kombate was amongst those calling for the release of 26 people arrested for protesting a new finance law in Niger. In November 2021 she signed a joint statement warning of the need "to prevent imminent genocide in Ethiopia".
