= Thought Catalog =

American website

- Website type: Contributor weblog
- Available in: English
- Founded: February 2010
- Headquarters: 190 North 10th Street; Brooklyn, New York 11211, {{{location_country}}}
- Area served: Worldwide
- Owners: The Thought & Expression Co.
- Founder: Chris Lavergne
- Key people: Chris Lavergne
- Website: thoughtcatalog.com
- Advertising: Yes
- Registration: No
- Launched: February 1, 2010; 16 years ago
- Current status: Active

Thought Catalog is a website founded in 2010 by American entrepreneur and media strategist Chris Lavergne owned by The Thought & Expression Company.

The site's founder, Chris Lavergne, registered the domain name in 2008, and began working on the site while a marketing strategist at Warner Bros. Records. Thought Catalog started publishing on February 1, 2010. By 2012, Thought Catalog began to attract many millennial readers, with nearly three-quarters of the site's audience falling into the 21- to 34-year-old demographic.

The site is based on a semi-open model, employing staff and freelance writers while also taking submissions for publication. Thought Catalog receives between 100 and 500 pieces a day via the submission form.

In July 2014 Thought Catalog was drawing more than 34 million unique visitors per month, with much of the traffic due to social sharing. Thought Catalog earns revenue from branded content and banner ads, with the Wall Street Journal featuring the site on its list of "Sponsored Content That Buzzed In 2014."

== Books ==
Thought Catalog launched Thought Catalog Books in 2012 with four e-books. The imprint accepts manuscripts from their active contributors and from unaffiliated authors, some with agents, some without. They publish both eBooks and print books. In September 2014, Thought Catalog Books and UTA sold the rights to The Tracking of a Russian Spy, by Mitch Swenson, to StudioCanal. The imprint published Prozac Nation author Elizabeth Wurtzel’s book Creatocracy in early 2015.

== Content ==
Thought Catalog’s content, which includes listicles, essays, and think pieces, has been noted for its "millennial" voice. Authors including Simon Critchley, Elizabeth Wurtzel, Tao Lin, Nick Mullen, Robert Greene, James Altucher, Mélanie Berliet, Gavin McInnes and Tim Ferriss have contributed to the site, in addition to previously unpublished essayists. These entailed co-publisher Brandon Scott Gorrell, conversational columnist Chelsea Fagan, technology and gaming writer Josh Liburdi, and Avery Hopwood Award-Winning Poet Jennifer Sussex.

Early on, the site was known for publishing alternative literature, with Tao Lin as a regular contributor. Later, it became associated with a personal, confessional style.
