= Melanie Benjamin =

Melanie Benjamin may refer to:

- Melanie Benjamin (Ojibwe leader) (born 1945), Native American leader
- Melanie Benjamin (author) (born 1962), American historical novelist

== See also ==
- Benjamin (surname)
- Melanie
