= Girls of Many Lands =

American Girl doll collection

- "Isabel of England" box containing its book and doll
- Type: Books with dolls
- Company: Mattel
- Country: United States
- Availability: 2002–2005

Girls of Many Lands is a series of books and dolls from the American Girl collection introduced in 2002. Each story is about a 12-year-old girl living in a different time period in different parts of the world. The books, written by award-winning authors, originally came with a matching doll intended for display. The series was discontinued in 2005 and the dolls have become a popular collectible item.

== Dolls ==
The dolls were first released in 2002, and retired in 2005. They cost between $48 and $54.

== Books ==
=== Isabel (Taking Wing) England, 1592 ===
Isabel Campion, living in London, England in 1592, struggles with fitting her father's image of a "proper" girl, and her adventurous and free-spirited ways often cause her problems in Tudor society. After making friends with a servant and having the audacity to watch a play at the theater, her father sends Isabel away to stay with her aunt de Vere in an attempt to have her learned in proper etiquette. Along the way she ends up in a situation with robbers, is rescued and then has to disguise herself as a boy to join a group of theatrical performers.

Isabel finally reaches Aunt de Vere's estate and quickly develops an admiration for her. Isabel is then taught interesting subjects and helps with her Aunt's clinic. When word reaches that her baby sister, Hope, is ill and it might be the plague, Isabel goes home just in time. Her Aunt and old nurse have given up, but Isabel nurses Hope through the night and identifies that she does not have the plague. Isabel is welcomed home by her father where he tells her that he's sending her back because she has changed and he wants her to continue it.

The book was written by Annie Dalton and illustrated by Mark Elliott.

=== Cécile (Gates of Gold) France, 1711 ===
In 1711 France, Cécile Revel is the daughter of a poor doctor, although she has learned to read, write and is an independent young lady. After helping a woman who had fallen from a horse, she ends up serving in the Versailles court of King Louis XIV. In the complicated world of court life, Cécile gradually discovers that her heart and spirit are more noble than she thinks. When most of the royal family falls ill, Cécile cannot bear for them all to die at the hands of misguided court physicians, and locks herself and some maids in a room with the young Duke d'Anjou away from the doctors, saving his life.

The book was written by Mary Casanova and illustrated by Jean-Paul Tibbles.

=== Spring Pearl (The Last Flower) China, 1857 ===
Called boyish by her new family for being able to read and write and work in a garden, twelve-year-old orphan Chou Spring Pearl (周 春珠) realizes that her "odd ways" just don't fit in the Sung home, the home she is taken to after her parents die in 1857 during the Second Opium War in Canton, China. She decides to be herself and slowly wins the respect of her benefactor's family, who did not initially respect her family or background. By being courageous and using her sensible practicality, Spring Pearl is able to save the Sung home.

The book was written by Laurence Yep and illustrated by Kazuhiko Sano.

=== Neela (Victory Song) India, 1939 ===
Neela Sen is an independent-minded and freedom-loving Indian girl who is hoping for peace when preparing for her sister's wedding, dealing with her mother wanting her to marry. Her father is away on "business", or so her mother believes, but he is really marching for peace and India's independence. Neela finds out that he might be hurt and goes to search for him, which results in her traveling all the way to Calcutta. While in the city, which is controlled by Great Britain, Neela learns the importance of India's independence, and sees a world beyond her small rural life. Along the way she is helped by a rich woman with a lavish lifestyle. Neela is able to save her father, and return home.

The book was written by Chitra Banerjee Divakaruni and illustrated by Troy Howell.

=== Minuk (Ashes in the Pathway) Yup'ik Alaska, 1890 ===
Minuk, a young, curious, and mischievous Yup'ik girl in the banks of Alaska, must endure the realization that her traditional way of life is changed forever with the arrival of Christian missionaries. Minuk is at first curious about the Hoffs and their strange ways. They have so many new things that she's never seen before. She also realizes that though they are different in some ways, ways about women remain the same. She grows a fondness for them, but realizes that the Hoffs are not as accepting of her people's ways as the Yup'ik are to the Hoffs.

The book was written by Kirkpatrick Hill and illustrated by Patrick Faricy.

=== Saba (Under the Hyena's Foot) Ethiopia, 1846 ===
After being kidnapped and brought to the emperor's palace in Gondar, Ethiopia, twelve-year-old Saba discovers that she and her brother are part of the emperor's desperate attempt to consolidate political power in the mid-1840s. Saba and her brother are initially sheltered in their home by their grandmother. Saba's brother, Mesfin, is tired of being treated like a child and encourages Saba to follow him in his disobedience and leave their sheltered home for a while. This gets them kidnapped and taken faraway to the palace of Gondar, where they discover secrets about their family and their past. Then suddenly, Mesfin disappears, and Saba is left all alone in the palace. Saba eventually comes up with a plan to save her brother, and finds the courage to escape the clutches of "the hyena."

The book was written by Jane Kurtz and illustrated by Jean-Paul Tibbles.

=== Leyla (The Black Tulip) Turkey, 1720 ===
While trying to help her financially destitute family, twelve-year-old Leyla ends up on a slave ship bound for Istanbul. Finding herself in the beautiful Topkapi Palace, she discovers that life in the sheltered world of the palace harem follows its own rigid rules, although it offers Leyla an unexpected opportunity during Turkey's brief Tulip Period of the 1720s. On the voyage, Leyla is in awe of how vast the world is. But Leyla soon discovers her voyage will lead her to slavery. She is bought at a market and taken to the Topkapi Palace, the secret world of women, where her life changes forever.

The book was written by Alev Lytle Croutier and illustrated by Kazuhiko Sano.

=== Kathleen (The Celtic Knot) Ireland, 1937 ===
Twelve-year-old Kathleen Murphy from Ireland comes from a poor family. When she and her sisters are caught for being late to their Catholic school, her mother is asked to come in the next day. However, rather than scold Kathleen, the head suggests she needs an outlet and recommends that she starts Irish dancing. Kathleen dreads this because her rival, Tess O'Hara, is also in the class. However, once she attends, she realizes she loves it. She is devastated when she learns the lessons will cost more than her family can afford, but the teacher, recognizing Kathleen's talent, agrees to teach her for free because she needs talented girls for an upcoming competition.

Kathleen makes progress in her dancing as the competition swiftly approaches. However, her dreams suddenly have to take a backseat when her mother becomes gravely ill. But in the end, her mother pulls through, and Kathleen's mother and aunt are able to pull things together at the last moment so that Kathleen is able to compete. When she wins a surprise first place, she thinks that nothing will top this, but it turns out that her aunt has a surprise of her own in the works.

The book was written by Siobhán Parkinson and illustrated by Troy Howell.
