= 2017–2018 protests in Niger =

The 2017–2018 protests in Niger was a wave of unprecedented demonstrations and violent protests that erupted nationwide in Niger in October 2017–March 2018 against a new social law that hurts the economy, according to protesters. Massive protests demanding the withdrawal of the law remained nonviolent, peaceful and the rallies and marches was held by thousands of civilians. Citizen-led protests by thousands of protesters occurred in March, after months of small protests (also the biggest since the 2009–2010 Nigerien constitutional crisis), tens of thousands of demonstrators marched and chanted slogans in Niamey against the law, calling for better conditions and the withdrawal of the anti-social finance law, and soon, clashes broke out. After 5 months of nonviolent and largely-bloodless demonstrations, protesters ended the protest movement with violence.

== See also ==
- 2009–2010 Nigerien constitutional crisis
