= Mélanie Berliet =

American author and journalist

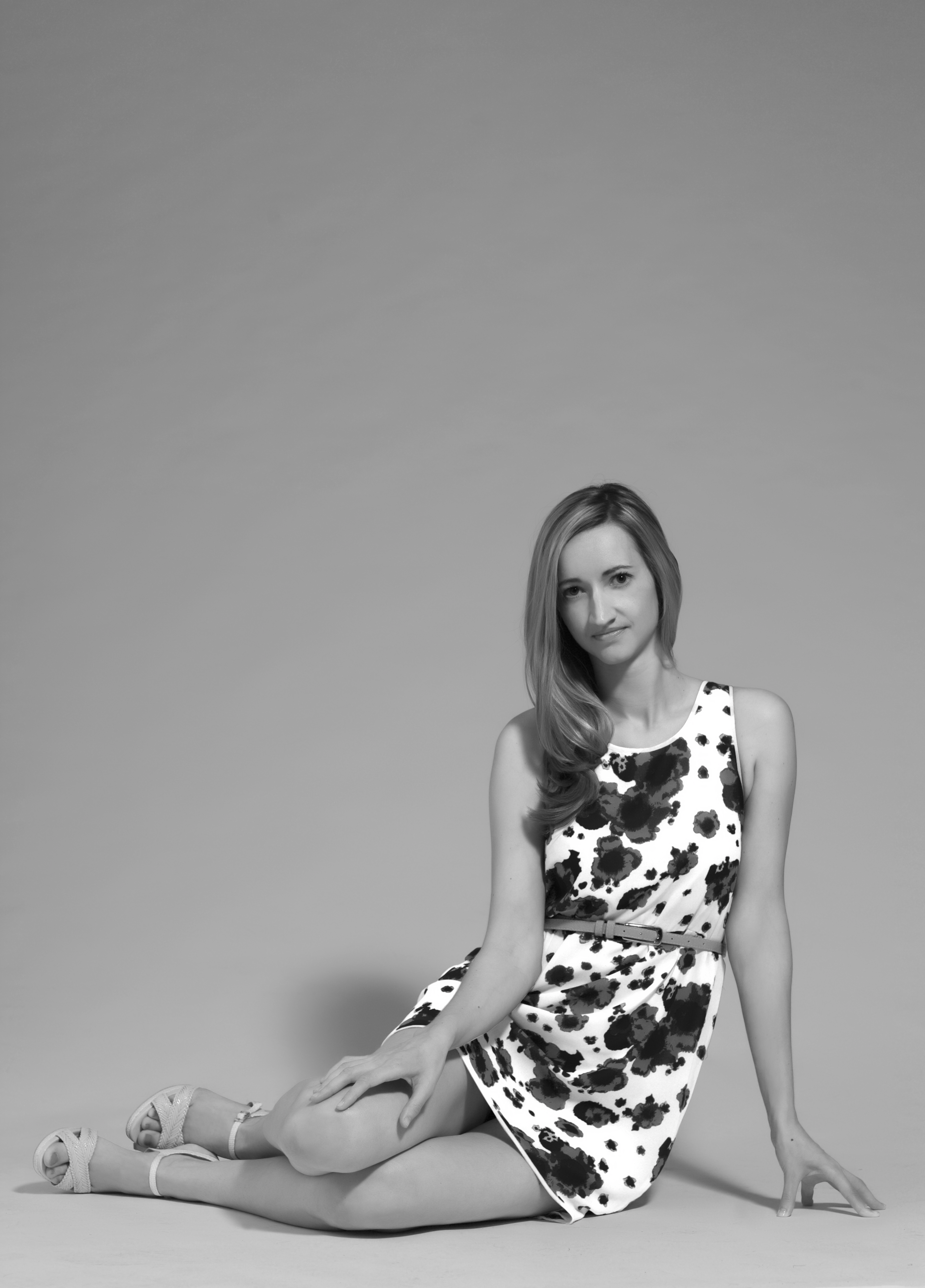
- Born: United States
- Education: Georgetown University
- Occupations: Author, journalist

Mélanie Berliet is an American author and journalist based in New York City. Berliet graduated from Georgetown University. When she was in her 20s, she worked on Wall Street, but left to pursue a writing career. Her freelance writing includes undercover investigation for the stories she writes on women and sexuality. She has written for Vanity Fair, The Atlantic, Elle, Pacific Standard Magazine, The Daily Beast, Esquire, Thought Catalog, Cosmopolitan, and New York magazine.

Berliet is currently (2019) General Manager at The Spruce, a lifestyle website focused on home decor and food, within the Dotdash publishing family. She released her debut children's book, You Are Not A Princess (And That's Ok!), in 2019.

Berliet published her memoir, Surviving In Spirit, in 2014. The book follows her sister Celine's battle with alcoholism and death. Berliet also outlines her time on Wall Street, and her experiences transitioning her career to become an immersive journalist.
