= Mélanie de Comoléra =

French painter (1789–1854)

- Born: 1789
- Died: 1854 (aged 64–65)

Mélanie de Comoléra (1789 – 1854) was a French flower painter.

She learned to paint from Cornelis van Spaendonck and is best known for her works on porcelain, painted for her employer, the Manufacture nationale de Sèvres. She was trained as a flower painter and made a copy of a Jan van Huysum painting in 1827 which she saw in London at the home of Thomas Hope in Cavendish Square.

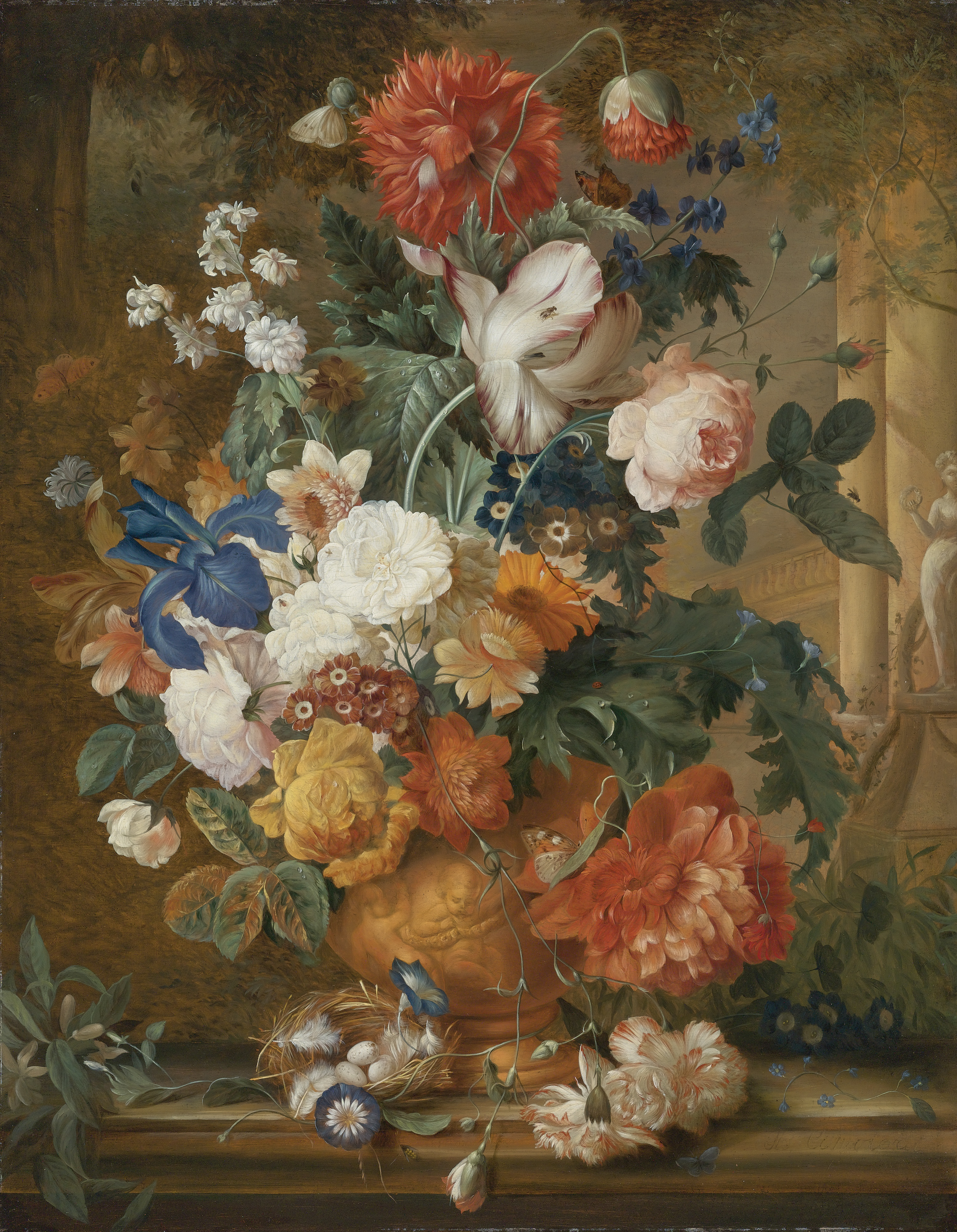
Still Life of Flowers, 1827

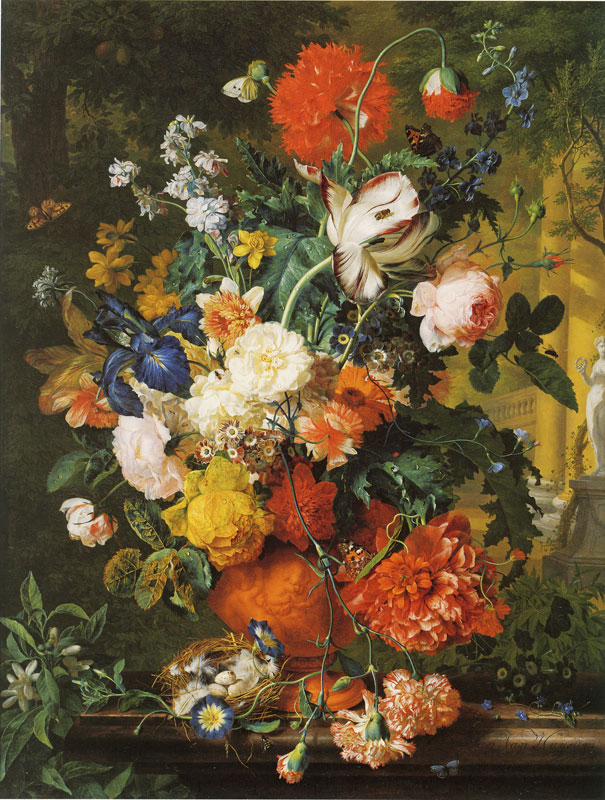
Original by Van Huysum, c. 1730
