= Melanie Johnson-DeBaufre =

American theologian

Melanie Johnson-DeBaufre is the Henry Anson Buttz Professor of New Testament and Early Christianity at Drew University. She is known for her research into early Christianity, its relationship to the Roman Empire, and modern feminist interpretation.

== Education and career ==
In 1988, Melanie Johnson-DeBaufre earned her Bachelor of Arts degree from Eastern College. She then went on to receive her Master of Divinity (M.Div) in 1992 and her Doctor of Theology (Th.D) in 2002 from Harvard Divinity School. Johnson-DeBaufre worked as an Assistant Professor of the Department of Religion and Philosophy at Luther College from 2000 to 2004. Starting in 2005, she continued her career as an Associate Dean of Academic Affairs and Assistant Professor of New Testament and Early Christianity at the Drew Theological School and the Graduate Division of Religion.

== Research and Major publications ==
The major works of Johnson-DeBaufre are primarily feminist interpretation and analysis of the earliest Christianities. Her feminist approach to religious historiography has allowed her to explore ancient texts and cultures from previously unknown angles.

=== Walk in the Ways of Wisdom: Essays in Honor of Elisabeth Schüssler Fiorenza ===
Johnson-DeBaufre co-edited this compilation of essays focusing on feminist theological research and interpretation. Written to honor Fiorenza's sixty-fifth birthday, the book is composed of essays written by students who studied under her and that focus on topics connected to Fiorenza's own research.

=== Jesus Among Her Children: Q, Eschatology, and the Construction of Christian Origins ===
In this major work, published by Harvard University Press, she analyzes theologians’ current knowledge of Q and its impact on modern theology. Furthermore, she questions whether Jesus is an apocalyptic prophet or a wisdom sage in the original work, and frequently connects her questions to the feminine concept of wisdom.

=== Mary Magdalene Understood ===
This novel is Johnson-DeBaufre's layman's translation of Jane Schaberg's The Resurrection of Mary Magdalene. Johnson-DeBaufre provides Shaberg's original ideas, condenses and simplifies her research and interpretation of Mary Magdalene, while also inserting her own insights about the figure of Mary Magdalene. Multiple sources on Mary Magdalene are explored including the ancient texts, both canon and apocryphal, and several popular culture renditions such as The Da Vinci Code and Franco Zeffirelli's Jesus of Nazareth.
