= Melanie Rieback =

Dutch-American computer scientist

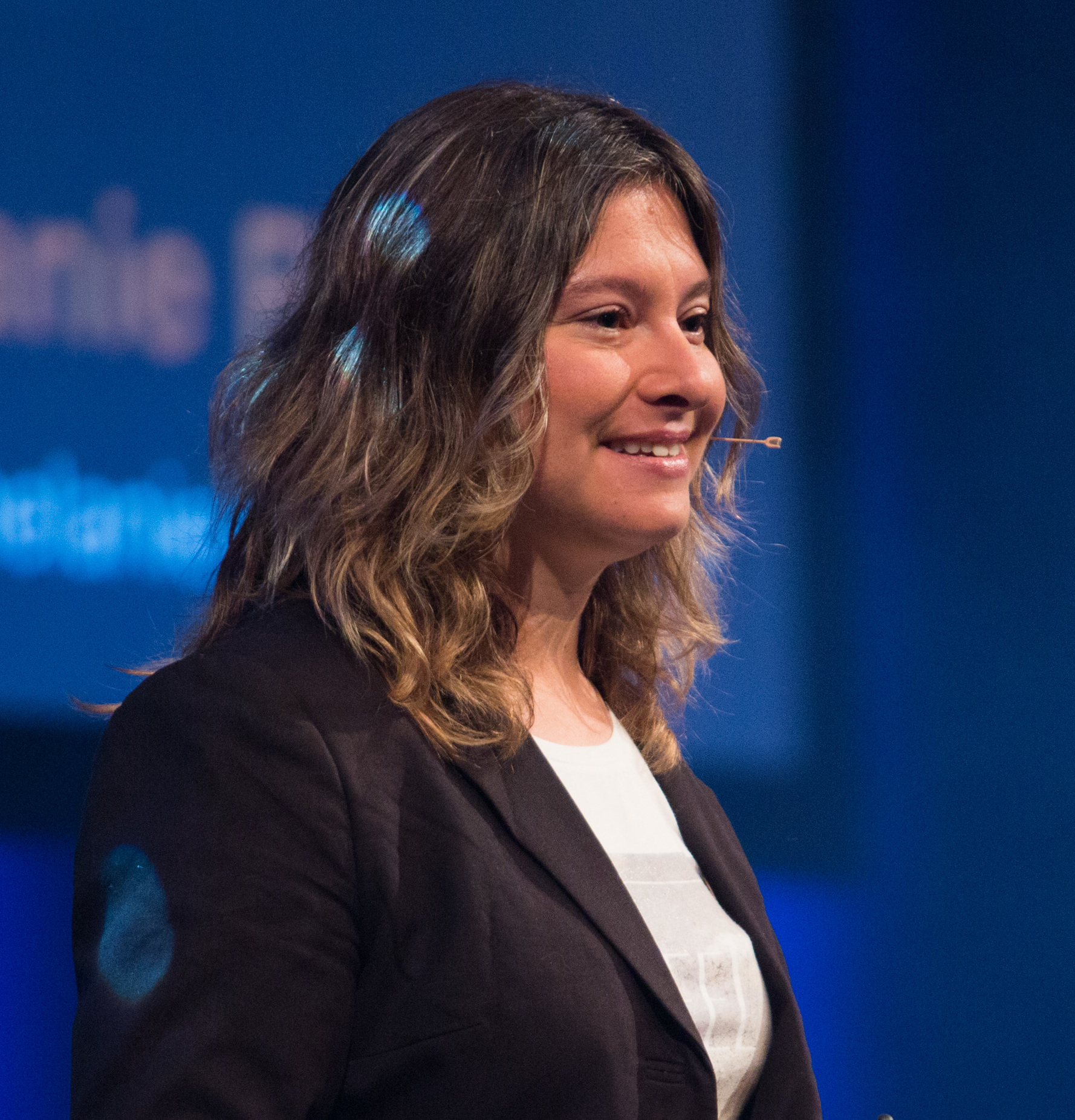
- Rieback in 2016
- Born: 26 October 1978 (age 48); Cleveland, Ohio, U.S.
- Education: University of Miami (B.S., 2000); Delft University of Technology (M.S., 2003); Vrije Universiteit Amsterdam (PhD, 2008)
- Occupation: Computer scientist

Melanie R. Rieback (born 26 October 1978) is a computer scientist, chiefly known for her work regarding the privacy and security of radio-frequency identification technology.

== Personal life ==
Melanie Rieback was born in Cleveland, Ohio on October 26, 1978. and raised in Florida. Her parents are David John Rieback and Eileen Sharon Rieback who worked at Bell Labs.

== Education ==
She obtained her Bachelor of Science in both Computer Science and Biology from the University of Miami in 2000. She received her Master‘s in Computer Science from the Delft University of Technology in the Netherlands in 2003. In 2008, she completed her PhD in Computer Science at Vrije Universiteit Amsterdam in the Netherlands.

== Work ==
=== RFID Guardian ===
In an interview, Rieback stated the importance of the radio-frequency identification security, she stated ″If you are using RFID on cows, who cares? But, with a passport, it takes one breach at the wrong time and it could wreck it for the RFID industry.″

The RFID Guardian was developed when Rieback was a graduate student at the Vrije Universiteit. She was supervised by Andrew S. Tanenbaum. She created the first RFID virus to show the loopholes in its security. The technology "jams" the signal so that the tags cannot be read from a certain distance. However, this technology still has limitations because it can block only the responses but not kill the queries of the tags. However, they have no intentions of mass-producing the technology.

Although there was concern about publishing the different ways that RFID tags could be exploited online, it causes the threats to this technology to no longer be theoretical. Also, it allows these concerns to be approached rather than proceeding with the idea that these threats do not exist.

=== Girl Geek Dinner NL ===
Girl Geek Dinner NL was founded as the Dutch chapter of Girl Geek Dinners. It is meant as a way to promote the idea of women pursuing fields that are typically male-dominated. Each dinner consists of talks from women who are exceptional in their field followed by a Q&A Session. Additionally, men are allowed to attend if they are invited by a female.

=== Radically Open Security ===
Radically Open Security was co-founded by Rieback, now its CEO. It is a non-profit organization that helps make the cyberworld more secure. They do only "non-fishy" jobs and provide step-by-step procedures in order for companies to do the same work without the company interfering. They also provide the tools and source code on their website to help others perform the same tasks that they do even if "it costs [them] repeat business". Radically Open Security provides services regarding code audits, cryptographic analysis, forensics, malware reversing, and more. Radically Open Security is also part of ACE Venture Lab

=== Other work ===
At the MIT Center for Genome Research/ Whitehead Institute, she worked on the Human Genome Project and co-authored the paper "Initial Sequencing and Analysis of the Human Genome".

== Awards ==
In 2010, Rieback was a finalist for the ICT Professional of the Year Award and named one of the most successful women in the Netherlands by Viva Magazine

Rieback was named as one of the top fifty Dutch inspirational women in 2016 in the list "Inspiring Fifty: Netherlands 2016".
