= Mental health care in South Africa =

Mental illness is very prevalent in South Africa, yet the country lacks many of the necessary resources and policies needed to execute an effective mental health strategy. Many factors including violence, communicable disease, and urbanisation have increased the prevalence of mental disorders in the country. The way in which these mental disorders are treated has changed over the years.

For a while, mental health care was mainly institutionalised. However, in 1997, following the White Paper Act, the South African government moved to deinstitutionalize mental health care and relegate it to the primary care setting. However, current data indicates that the goal of deinstitutionalization and effective primary mental care has still not been fulfilled.

African Traditional Medicine still plays a huge role in African society. Even though it often functions in an inhibitory manner, a comprehensive health plan with a focus on collaboration between traditional practices and Western medicine could prove very beneficial. Another factor regarding the very nature of mental disorders complicates this issue even further.

A complete cure of a mental disorder is nebulous and can only be attained gradually with time. For this reason, mental illness is hard to cure among such a paucity of resources. Without the necessary intermediate care and continuity in therapy, many patients regress when released from the hospital.

== Deinstitutionalisation and primary health care ==
Prior to 1997, mental health care in South Africa was mainly institutionalised, and little emphasis was placed on the development of curative therapies. Due to a paucity of resources, it was more cost effective to simply isolate mentally unstable individuals rather than invest in effective, yet costly care. Following the 1997 White Paper Act and the National Health Act 61 of 2003, the government made an attempt to deinstitutionalize mental health care and transfer the bulk of this responsibility to the level of Primary Health Care (PHC).

General category psychopharmacological drugs, which had previously only been available at mental institutions, are now present with 96% availability at primary health care facilities. However, it was found in a study conducted by the World Health Organization that approximately 56% of mental health care still takes place in an institutionalised setting. In the country of South Africa, there are only 290 registered psychiatrists, providing a physician to population ratio of 1:183,000. With PHC facilities, there are only 0.04 psychiatrists per in-patient bed.

Primary health care facilities are so severely understaffed that a physician often does not have time to do anything other than refer a mental case to the district hospital. In addition, less serious cases such as depression are often overlooked and rarely diagnosed. Doctors need to prioritise their work and spending time on a mood disorder case is seen as an ineffective use of their time.

There is also a lack of communication between primary health care facilities and district hospitals. PHC physicians often refer mental cases to the district hospital, but rarely hear feedback on the case. Since the primary care physician never learns about the new diagnoses or changes in treatment, he is unable to provide adequate follow-up care. Not only does this break the continuity of care, but it also obstructs physicians from learning about these mental disorders and the appropriate treatments necessitated for different sets of symptoms. This severely restricts any potential for a more autonomous primary care division.

== Lack of official health policy ==
The quality of mental health care varies greatly from district to district. For instance, general psychotropic medications such as anti-psychotics and anti-epileptics are present with 81–100% availability in 4 provinces, 21–50% in 1 province, and 0% in another province. The South African government has yet to institute a set of firm health protocols. The policies outlined in the 1997 "National Health Policy Guidelines for Improved Mental Health in South Africa" were supposed to be the official health policy document. However, in interviews conducted between WHO representatives and South African Department of Health officials, it was found that more recently instituted policies contradicted statutes set out in the National Health Policy bill. Therefore, since adherence to this bill is virtually nonexistent, South Africa does not really possess a national health policy.

In order for the Department of Health to create an effective health policy, it first needs to establish standards for data collection and indicators to be applied to statistical analysis. Although protocols regarding data collection and reporting exist, the sheer lack of personnel among PHC facilities makes such requirements impractical. Only 75% of PHC mental facilities transmit some sort of statistical data to the health department, and much of this data is often incomplete and far from rigorous.

== Additional problems ==
In a study conducted in 2009 it was found that of the 16.5% of people with mental disorders, only 25% had received treatment. It has been found that the very factors that contribute to this high prevalence of mental illness also serve to inhibit its treatment. Communicable disease, civil strife, and poverty run rife throughout South African society. However, faced with limited resources, the South African government must prioritise its problems, and mental illness does not often take precedence. As a result, many mental health facilities remain both severely understaffed and underfunded.

An additional problem resides in the high turnover among hospital staff. The unique nature of psychiatric illness necessitates a certain degree of experience before effective treatment can be rendered. However, many nurses leave before they are fully trained. This is largely due to the lack of oversight from mental health specialists as many nurses stationed at the primary care facilities have little to no interaction with them. As a result, this lack of direction results in the nurses becoming overwhelmed and eventually many will burn out and transfer. Any progress made in the training of these nurses will be lost and the training process must be started again.

Additionally, the psychiatric nurses in the district hospitals lack specialisation. Due to staff shortages, it is necessary to rotate nurses through all areas of the hospital. As a result, the nurses caring for the psych patients have varying degrees of experience and many possess minimal familiarity with mental illness.

Another problem is the lack of intermediate care once a patient is released from the hospital. Services such as support groups, special housing, and supported employment are virtually nonexistent in South Africa. The Mental Health Care Act of 2002 states that follow-up care should be provided for chronic cases within available resources. However, due to the lack of resources, this intermediate care is never provided. Once treatment at a mental health facility is completed, the patient is handed back into the care of his fellow villagers and they are informed of the discharge instructions. However, a lack of adherence to these instructions results in many patients regressing after being released.

== Origins of mental health issues in South Africa ==
Many factors including work-related stress, disease, poverty, abuse, sexual violence, as well as the decay of the traditional value system are contributing to the high occurrence of mental health issues in South Africa. In a study conducted by the Mental Health and Poverty research Program, it was found that approximately 16.5% of the adult population in South Africa has mental illness; 1% have a severe life debilitating mental disease. 30% of South Africans are likely to develop a mental illness in their lifetimes, depression being the most common ailment.

However, these statistics may be an underestimation. Among the native population, many still hold to the traditional belief that mental illness results from a demonic possession. As a result, many individuals for fear of social ostracism, keep their mental illness secret instead of seeking the much needed medical attention. This means that there is still a significant population with mental illness that is currently unrepresented in mental health statistics.

=== Post-traumatic stress disorder ===
Probably one of the largest contributors to the high frequency of mental disorders is violence. Of the adult population ages 16 to 64, it was found that 23% were exposed to a traumatic event of violence in the past year. These traumatic events include acts such as fighting a war, being tortured, or participating in violence. Among this population, it was determined that mental illness including symptoms of Posttraumatic stress disorder (PTSD) was 8.5 times more prevalent than among the general population.

=== Substance abuse ===
Another factor contributing to mental illness in South Africa is substance abuse. Many provinces are used as drug trafficking routes, and as the South African government lacks the necessary resources to control this problem, many of these illicit drugs find their way into local populations as a drug. In addition, the availability of the wild growing Cannabis plant allows for its rampant abuse among all age categories. It was found that 52% of street children smoke the Cannabis plant and 22% on a daily basis. Educational campaigns are limited, and as a result, many do not realise the impinging health effects that will result from substance abuse.

=== Disease as a trigger ===
Diseases such as malaria, typhoid fever, and HIV provide a significant contribution to the prevalence of mental illness. Some of these diseases such as cerebral malaria can bear a direct physiological effect on the mental functionality of the patient. However, even more poignant is the ability of disease to strike a radiating blow to the patient's emotional psyche. For instance, the prevalence of mental illness among those with HIV is 43.7% compared to the 16.5% observed among the general population. This data indicates that disease delivers equal emotional damage as it does physiological harm.

=== Exposure to Western cultural pressures ===
Both growth of the industrial sector and rapid urbanisation are undermining the social fabric of traditional society. The alluring financial and social prospects of an urban environment draw many young individuals splitting up families and villages. The family network which was once regarded as the emotional, moral, and social centre of the community is now being undermined.

As a result, many who are drawn to the city lose touch with their traditional roots and begin to lose a sense of purpose and direction as the focus is turned to utilitarian and hedonistic endeavours. In addition, they no longer have the invaluable social support structure that was once provided by family networks and village communities.

== The role of African traditional medicine ==
African Traditional Medicine still plays a large role in African society. It was found that 45% of the black patients that attended a community mental health clinic had consulted a healer for their problem. Additionally, 26% were simultaneously seeking treatment from both the traditional healers and the psychiatrists. Traditional healers are often instrumental in treating mental illness. Psychological healing relies more on a cultural and emotional understanding than it does on possessing medical knowledge.

In an interview, Dr. Mustafa Elmasri, a Gaza psychologist with over twenty years of experience describes how he has often collaborated with African Traditional Medicine. Instead of labelling traditional healers as primitive and demonic, he worked with them and even trained some of them in scientific methods for identifying certain mental illnesses such as epilepsy and psychosis. Dr. Elmasri found that "traditional healers were the key partner beyond the patients and their families in gaining an understanding of the psychological experience and access to social support structures".

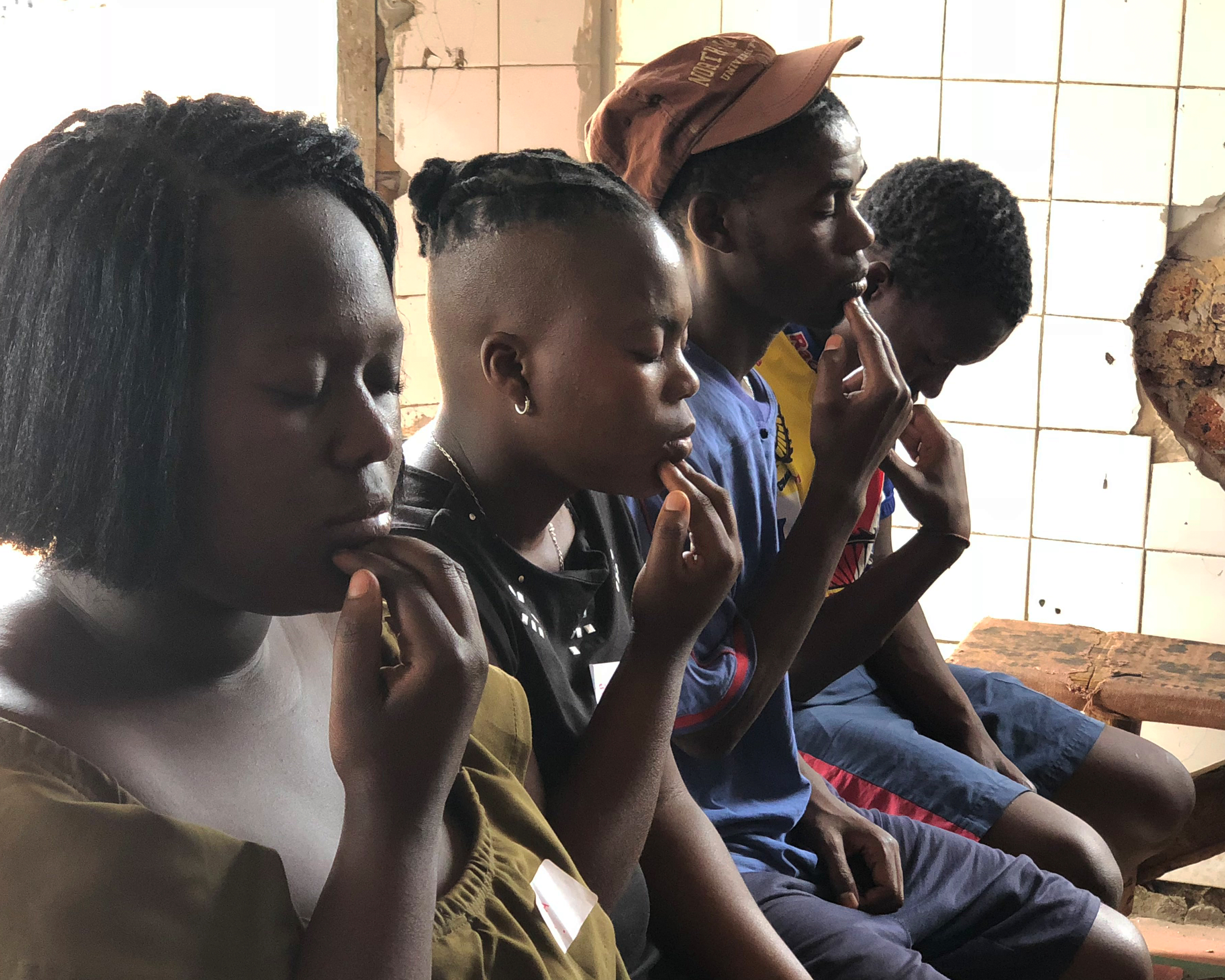
Unemployed youth attending an emotional fitness class in Kliptown.

Beliefs are fundamental to behaviour, and therefore a deeper understanding of traditional medicine will help to improve the effectiveness of psychological care. Dr. Elmasri also recounts how he occasionally refers mild stress cases to the healers as these patients require a holistic approach from individuals that they know and trust. The Traditional Health Practitioners Bill in South Africa, No. 25 of 2004 made attempts for the "formalization, regulation and professionalization" of traditional medicine doctors. However, this bill has never been put into effect and formal collaboration between Western and traditional medicine has yet to be established.

The Westernised approach to treating mental illness often ends up worsening the patient's condition. In a three decade long study conducted by the World Health Organization which includes data from 30 research sites in 19 countries, it was found that people diagnosed with schizophrenia experienced better outcomes among "developing" countries than they did in Europe and the United States. Much of this trend is attributed to socio-cultural conditions such as "increased family involvement, informal economies, less segregation of the mentally ill and community cohesion".

Effective treatment of mental illness necessitates the recognition and identification of cultural differences. For example, in Western society, many derive a sense of self-worth from their ability to survive in a competitive economy. However, the informal economies of the developing nations allow for less stressful work-related roles. Therefore, conducting therapy in South Africa with an emphasis on "valued citizenship" does nothing more than create an intangible goal which will simply cause added stress to the individual. Effective treatment must be uniquely targeted to each culture with careful consideration to the socio-cultural conditions and "contextually relevant coping mechanisms". Neglect to recognise these essential cultural factors will result with impotent and detrimental treatment.

== See also ==
- Healthcare in South Africa
