= Friendship bench =

Zimbabwean mental health program

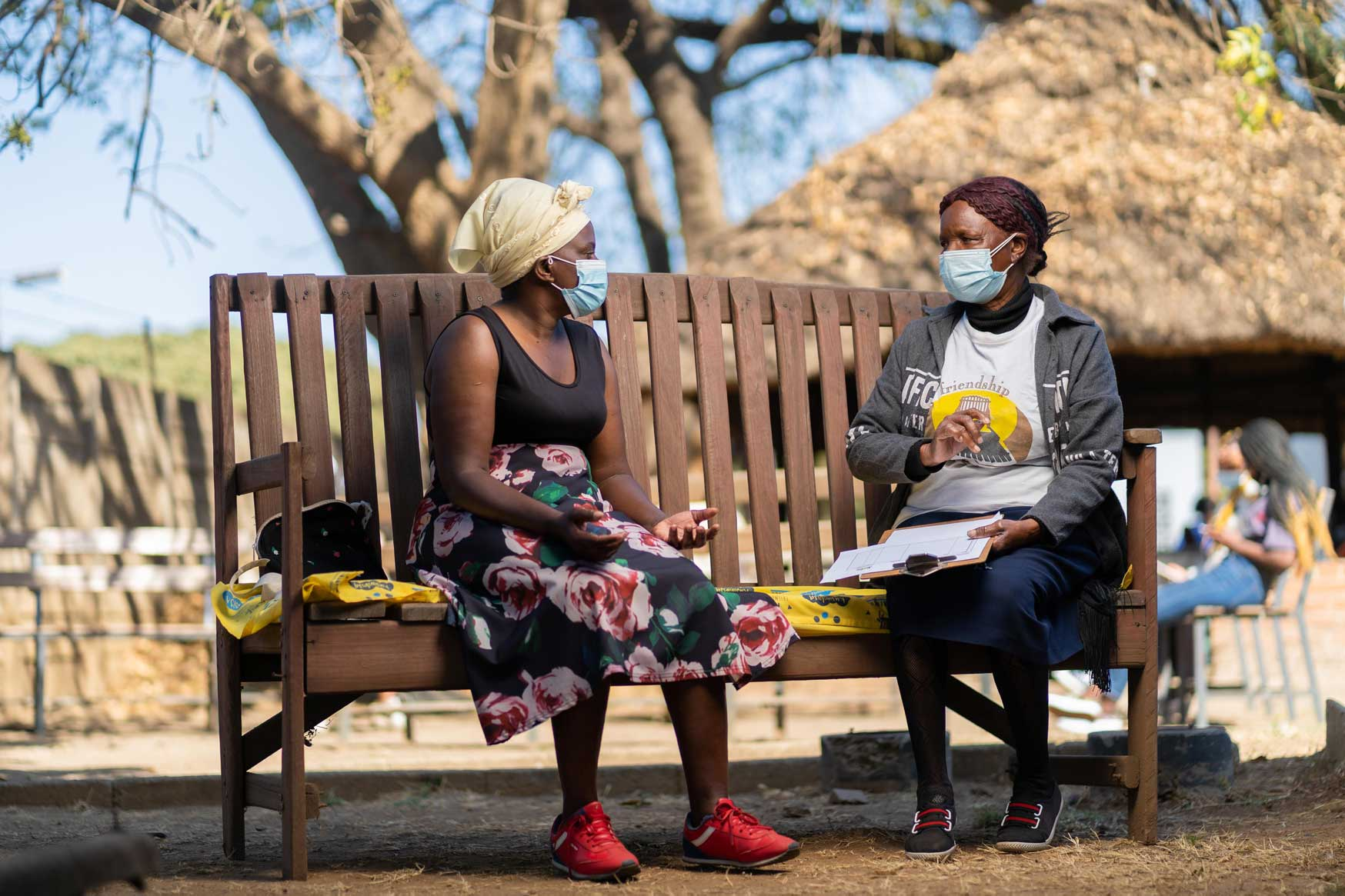
Ambuya Utano (Community Grandmother) having a problem-solving therapy session on the Friendship Bench in Harare, Zimbabwe

The Friendship Bench programme is a Zimbabwean community-based mental health intervention where trained community health workers (known as "grandmothers") sit on wooden park "Friendship Benches" set up at primary health care clinics or safe community spaces and provide structured problem-solving talk therapy to community members who come looking for mental health support or are referred by nurses or other community members.

The programme was founded by Dixon Chibanda in 2006, and was developed over a 20-year period of community-based research to bridge the mental health treatment gap. Friendship Bench offers what has been seen as an effective, simple, cost-effective option to provide evidence-based mental health care in under-resourced settings.

== Operation ==
The Friendship Bench aims to enhance mental well-being and improve quality of life through the use of trained community health workers (CHWs) who deliver individual problem-solving therapy sessions to people struggling with mild to moderate mental health problems such as anxiety and depression. The CHWs are trained in a cognitive behavioural therapy-based approach with a strong emphasis on problem-solving therapy (PST) and behavioural activation at primary health care (PHC) level to address kufungisisa, a local Shona concept which literally translates into "thinking too much" and whose symptoms resemble depression and anxiety. When clients come to the Friendship Bench seeking mental health support, they are screened with a Shona Symptoms Questionnaire-14 (SSQ-14), an indigenous measure of common mental disorders.

The talk therapy sessions take place on wooden park benches, which are usually placed in quiet, discreet spaces under shady trees at primary health care clinics or community rooms.

== Grandmothers ==
Uniquely, Friendship Bench uses "Grandmothers", more fondly known as Ambuya Utano or Gogos, to deliver the problem-solving therapy intervention. The FB Grandmothers are rooted in their community and are the custodians of local wisdom and knowledge.

Without any prior medical or mental health experience, each Grandmother or equivalent CHW goes through eight days of training in a structured problem-solving based approach which emphasizes listening skills, empathy, connection and a non-judgemental attitude along with steps to generating a SMART action plan and delivery of a screening tool. After the training, each CHW has a 30-day clinic internship. In this way, as described in the Friendship Bench Randomized Control Trial published in JAMA in 2016:

...the problem-solving therapy steps help clients identify a problem (eg, unemployment) rather than get a diagnosis. The psychological approach of problem-solving therapy works through enabling a more positive orientation toward resolving problems and empowering people to have a sense of greater coping and control over their lives.

== Support groups ==
After the one-on-one talk therapy, Friendship Bench clients are introduced to a peer led support group known as Circle Kubatana Tose (CKT), meaning "holding hands together". In these groups clients are connected to others who have also gone through mental health problems and found solutions on the Friendship Bench. Group members tend to come from the same community and so can relate to each other's struggles. CKT groups contribute to clients' sense of belonging and reduces stigma surrounding mental health.
