= Melanie Morris =

Canadian surgeon

Melanie Morris is a Métis surgeon. She is the first Métis pediatric surgeon in Canada.

Morris completed fellowships in pediatric surgery and pediatric urology. She teaches at the University of Manitoba and founded the Winnipeg Global Surgery Office. She is a board member of the College of Surgeons of East, Central and Southern Africa and the Canadian Network of International Surgery. She is also the Lead for Indigenous Health at The Children's Hospital of Winnipeg.

In 2021 she was named one of the Top 100 Most Powerful Women in Canada. She has also received the Pediatric Chairs of Canada (PCC) 2021 Emerging Academic Leader Award, the Ongomiizwin Health Services Award for Respect and the Manitoba 150 Award.
