= Melanie Healey =

Former business executive (born 1961)

Melanie "Mel" Healey (born 1961) is a Brazilian business executive. She was the former group president for the North American division of Procter & Gamble

== Career ==
Healey started her career at S.C. Johnson & Sons in 1983 in Brand Management in Rio de Janeiro, Brazil. In 1986, she moved to São Paulo to work in Product Management at Johnson & Johnson and was promoted to Group Product Manager of their baby care division in 1988.

In 1990, she moved to Procter & Gamble, São Paulo, Brazil. She started in marketing to Latin American markets, specifically diapers, fabric and hair care, and rose through the ranks of the feminine care division, eventually becoming group president of Global Feminine Care. During her tenure, the division delivered double-digit growth. Ad Age credited her marketing strategy for the rapid acceleration of the Always and Tampax brands. In 2007, her portfolio was expanded to include health care.

In 2009, Healey became group president for the North American division of the company; in 2013, North America was P&G's largest market, representing 40% of P&G's global sales. Healey was credited with reversing a sales decline in the U.S. and Canada when she took over the division, but sales growth decreased to less than 1 percent by 2014. Fortune called her a "steady influence" at the company as head of P&G's "largest and most challenged unit." In 2013, Healey was promoted alongside three other veteran P&G executives to report directly to CEO A.G. Lafley; this move was widely seen as a competition to become Lafley's successor.

In 2007, Healey was added to Fortune's 50 Most Powerful Women, and remained on the list until 2014.

In 2014, Healey announced she would retire from Procter & Gamble in 2015. Her retirement shocked some industry insiders, who thought she was a strong contender to succeed Lafley despite struggles in the North American division. Some speculated that her lack of experience in beauty divisions or Asian markets as why she was not chosen.

Since leaving Procter & Gamble, Healey has joined the Boards of Directors for Bacardi, Target, Hilton Hotels, PPG, and Verizon Wireless.

== Personal life ==
Healey was born in Brazil. Her father is British and her mother is Chilean. She earned a degree in Business Administration from the University of Richmond in Virginia.
