= Melanie Shanahan =

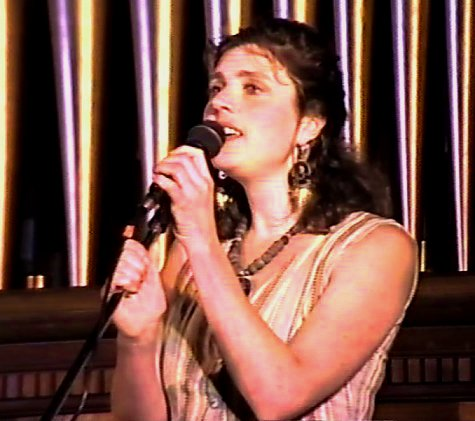
- Melanie Shanahan on stage in Hobart, Australia, April 1995

Background information
- Born: Melanie Therese Shanahan; January 1964
- Origin: Sydney, New South Wales, Australia
- Died: 10 December 2003 (aged 39) Melbourne, Victoria, Australia
- Genres: World music; folk music
- Occupations: Musician; choir director; vocal coach
- Instruments: Vocals; guitar; piano
- Years active: 1975–2003
- Labels: Independent; Black Market

Melanie Therese Shanahan (January 1964 – 10 December 2003) was an Australian world-folk singer-songwriter, choir director and vocal coach. She was a member of the groups, Arramaieda (1987–95) and Akasa (1998–2002). She also collaborated with Coco's Lunch and Safara. Shanahan had mental health problems from the 1990s, and she died from suicide at the age of 39.

== Biography ==
Melanie Therese Shanahan, performed in Sydney from the mid-1970s. She was influenced by political singer-songwriters, in particular Sweet Honey in the Rock. She had no formal singing lessons. Shanahan moved to Hobart, to participate in the environmentalist movement, where she formed a female a cappella band, Arramaieda (a.k.a. Aramieeda), in the mid-1980s. They were named for an aboriginal woman, "who lived on Bruny Island (off the Tasmanian coast). [Wace recalled] 'She was a great singer and had a lot of strength and vitality'." The group began as an irregular ensemble with nine or ten members. In 1988 they recorded and produced, A capella group Aramieeda [Arramaieda] 10 songs, by the line-up of Shanahan, Rachel Hore, Deborah Wace, plus Ruth, Heather and Trish (surnames not recorded). It was recorded at The Sound Cellar, Hobart and issued via LINC Tasmania as an audiocassette.

By 1990 the line-up was a trio, comprising Shanahan together with Rachel Hore and Deborah Wace. They recorded 12 tracks at the ABC studios in December, which "received national airplay": they followed with an Australian tour including an impromptu appearance at the Adelaide Fringe Festival. Mike Jackson of The Canberra Times caught their gig at a local venue, Tilley Devine's Cafe Gallery, in April 1990, and observed that their music, "is full of lovely harmonies and a selection of songs that places them somewhere between The Flying Pickets and Sydney women's a'capella group Blindman's Holiday. More folk than the former and more up tempo than the latter."

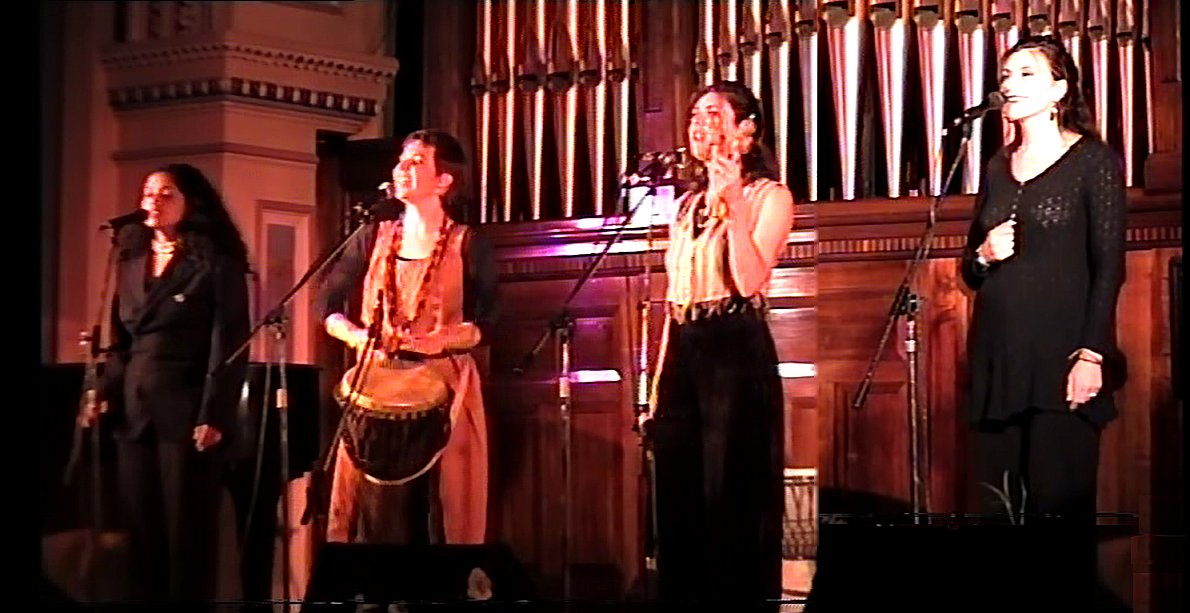
Shanahan (second from right) and Arramaieda on stage in Hobart, Australia, April 1995

Arramaieda released their studio album, More Ways than One, in 1992 via Natural Symphonies, which was recorded by a four-piece: Shanahan, Hore, Teresa Castley and Kirsten MacKenzie at Studios 301, Sydney in June of that year. Six of 14 tracks are written by Shanahan: Karen Fredericks of Green Left Weekly felt, "each shines like a jewel. 'Flying Away from You' and "The Sea" draw on nature as a source of inner peace in a world in which it has become difficult 'to know what to feel'. The chorus of 'Troubled Souls', 'I'm teaching my heart to sing', is an affirmation, and 'Struggle and Survive', with the uplifting 'She will not lose' motif, is a dedication to women who fight for freedom." During August–September 1992 Arramaieda toured with Kev Carmody. By 1995 Teresa Castley had been replaced by a new member, the Mauritius-born singer Pascale Rose; in this line-up the band also featured on Carmody's 1995 album Images & Illusions, however in the same year Shanahan's mental health issues led to the break-up of the band.

Shanahan relocated to Melbourne to join the acclaimed vocal group Coco's Lunch, who she performed regularly with until parting ways a couple of years later. Her need to sing politically relevant music led to joining, Akasa, contributing tracks to their first two albums. Their debut self-titled album appeared in 1999, which was "recorded, mixed and mastered" by Ross Cockle (Mother Goose, Australian Crawl, Beargarden) with the line-up of Shanahan, Diana Clark, Vicki King and Andrea Watson. Their second album, World Citizen (March 2002), had Shanahan and King joined by Heidi Bradburn and Mihi Rangi; it was co-produced by the group with Siiri Metsar via Black Market Music . Dieter Bajzek of Folk Alliance Australia observed, "Finally a full-length, well recorded and mastered CD... from this polished and hard-working female a cappella quartet, supported by tasteful percussion. Great original songs (except two trad. items from NZ and Africa)... covering worthy and interesting topics."

She also directed four choirs, including Living Out Loud, The Boîte Millennium Chorus, and Yirriba. Melanie Shanahan committed suicide at the age of 39. A memorial concert was held in suburban, Eltham in early December. As of February 2005, Akasa had continued with the line-up of Bradburn, Clark, King and Watson: they finished their set list with "Shanahan's 'Walk with Me' [which] radiated a serene, hymn-like quality that made them especially poignant. Shanahan was one of the founding members of Akasa, and [the song] served not only as a heartfelt conclusion to the concert, but a fitting tribute to a woman who embodied so many of the qualities that still resonate in the group's music.". Shanahan was later commemorated in separate songs by the U.K.'s Rory McLeod and Australia's Carl Cleves.
