= Melanie Stinnett =

American politician

Member of the Missouri House of Representatives from the 133rd district
- Incumbent
- Assumed office January 4, 2023
- Preceded by: Curtis Trent
- Succeeded by: Katelyn Zach (elect)

Personal details
- Party: Republican
- Education: Missouri State University
- Website: www.melaniestinnett.com

Melanie Stinnett is an American politician serving as a Republican member of the Missouri House of Representatives from the 133rd district since 2023. The district covers much of southwestern Springfield in Greene County. She succeeded Curtis Trent, who was elected to the Missouri Senate. Stinnett is a speech-language pathologist and healthcare executive, and chairs the House Health and Mental Health Committee. She is a candidate for the Missouri Senate's 30th district in 2026.

== Early life and career ==
Stinnett holds two master's degrees from Missouri State University and works as a speech-language pathologist and healthcare executive. She founded a pediatric speech, occupational and physical therapy clinic in Springfield.

== Legislative career ==
Stinnett was first elected in November 2022, defeating Democrat Amy Blansit, and was re-elected in 2024 over Derrick Nowlin. She chairs the House Health and Mental Health Committee and has focused on health care policy and issues affecting people with disabilities.

In her first session Stinnett proposed changes to Missouri's Ticket to Work Health Assurance Program, which allows working adults with disabilities to retain state health coverage. The changes raised the income limits under which participants remain eligible, exempted up to $50,000 of a spouse's income from the calculation, and set the premium cap at 250 percent of the federal poverty level. Stinnett said the previous limits discouraged participants from accepting raises or promotions and prevented them from building retirement savings. The legislation was signed into law by Governor Mike Parson in 2023.

Stinnett sponsored legislation to establish a "gold carding" program for prior authorization of treatments and prescriptions. Under the proposal, insurers would review a provider's prior authorization requests over a six-month evaluation period; providers whose requests were approved at least 90 percent of the time would be exempt from submitting them for the following six months. Stinnett said she had encountered prior authorization obstacles regularly in her work as a speech-language pathologist.

State and national organizations representing physicians, nurses, social workers and hospitals supported the bill. Opposition came primarily from the insurance industry and pharmacy benefit managers; an executive of Cigna Healthcare submitted testimony arguing that gold card policies "increase inappropriate care and costs." The St. Louis Area Business Health Coalition, an employer group whose members include Edward Jones, Peabody Energy and Boeing, also opposed the measure.

After Missouri voters voted in 2024 in favor of a constitutional amendment to protect reproductive rights, including the right to abortion, Missouri's Republican lawmakers subsequently sought to continue to block abortion access in the state. Stinnett argued that voters misunderstood what they were voting for and subsequently filed a counter amendment that did not explicitly mention that it would ban abortion.

In 2026 Stinnett sponsored House Bill 2974, handled in the Senate by Jamie Burger, which modified provisions on licensure reciprocity for health care professionals. The act specified that a provider granted license reciprocity in Missouri may provide telehealth services within their scope of practice, and allowed physician assistants to practice across participating states without obtaining additional licenses. Governor Mike Kehoe signed it in July 2026.

== 2026 Senate Campaign ==
In April 2025 Stinnett announced a campaign for the Missouri Senate's 30th district, an open seat created by the term limiting of Lincoln Hough, and formally launched it in Springfield the following month. The district primarily encompasses Springfield. Fellow state representative Betsy Fogle, a Democrat representing the 135th district, announced a campaign for the same seat. Springfield has become more competitive in recent cycles, with three of its four core House districts held by Democrats at the time of her announcement.
