= Mélanie Briche =

French footballer

Personal information
- Date of birth: 5 February 1975 (age 51)
- Place of birth: Amiens, France
- Position: Forward

Senior career*
| Years | Team | Apps | (Gls) |
| 1994-2008 | Toulouse FC | | |

International career
| 1999-2000 | France | 10 | (0) |
- * Club domestic league appearances and goals

Mélanie Briche (born February 5, 1975) is a retired footballer who played as a forward for Division 1 Féminine club Toulouse FC. Since retiring from professional football, Briche is currently the coach of the Toulouse club, the Rodeo FC.

== International career ==
Briche represented France 10 times and scored 0 goals.

== Honours ==
Toulouse

- Division 1 Féminine: 1998–99, 1999–00, 2000–01, 2001–02
- Challenge de France / Coupe de France féminine: 2001–02
