= Melanie Penn =

American Christian musician

- Born: Melanie Grayson Penn; Virginia
- Origin: New York City
- Genres: CCM; folk; Americana; folk rock; alternative country; country gospel; indie pop; worship
- Occupations: Singer, songwriter
- Instrument: Vocals
- Years active: 2010–present
- Website: melaniepenn.com

Melanie Grayson Penn is an American Christian musician, who primarily plays an indie pop, folk rock, and alternative country style of music. She has released six independently-made studio albums, Wake Up Love in 2010, Hope Tonight in 2014, Immanuel in 2017, "Immanuel: The Folk Sessions" in 2019, "More Alive Vol. 1" in 2020 and "More Alive Vol. 2" in 2022. She lives in New York City.

== Early and personal life ==
Melanie Grayson Penn was born in Washington, DC and grew up in Falls Church, Virginia, She was brought up in a Christian home environment, though still considered herself to be "'a bit of a lost soul'". She started singing at a very young age, at church services and as Amahl in the operetta Amahl and the Night Visitors. In the sixth grade she began private voice lessons, and competed as a classical vocalist through her teen years, preparing for a career in opera.

After much deliberation she relocated to New York City circa 2000 to pursue musical theater instead. There she witnessed the twin towers collapse from her apartment buildings roof in the East Village. This had a profound impact on her life. She went to church after the events of 9/11 and heard some sermons preached by Tim Keller, where she would eventually join his congregation and be a worship leader at Redeemer Presbyterian Church.

== Music career ==
Upon relocating to New York City, Penn performed professionally in musical theatre. She toured with the Broadway national touring company of Grease! starring Frankie Avalon (Patty Simcox / Sandy Dumbrowski u/s) and was attached to many productions both in New York City and regionally, including the musical Tarnish by Scott Mebus. She was nominated for a Carbonell Award for best supporting actress in a musical for portraying Amneris in the musical AIDA.

She became increasingly interested in songwriting and began writing songs. In 2008 she started collaborating with Nashville-based producer Ben Shive to record original material. She released her first independently-made studio album, Wake Up Love, on January 19, 2010. Her subsequent independently-made studio album, Hope Tonight, was released on May 20, 2014. In 2017 she released Immanuel, a Christmas concept album of original material. It was highly lauded in the Christian and mainstream press and reached #1 on Amazon's worship, holiday, and Christian charts. During the Covid era she released a two volume album set: More Alive Vol. 1 and More Alive Vol. 2. She performs regularly in New York City and nationally.

== Discography ==
Studio albums, solo artist

- Wake Up Love (January 19, 2010, independent)
- Hope Tonight (May 20, 2014, independent)
- Immanuel (November 3, 2017)
- Immanuel, The Folk Sessions (October 25, 2019)
- More Alive Vol. 1 (September 25, 2020)
- More Alive Vol. 2 (July 15, 2022)
- The Rising: A Resurrection Album (October 10, 2025)

Compilation albums

- In the City, "A New City", Redeemer Presbyterian Church (January 1, 2009)
- Songs for the Book of Luke, The Gospel Coalition (March 26, 2013)

Background vocalist

- Light for the Lost Boy, Andrew Peterson
- Psalms, Sandra McCracken
- Songs from the Valley, Sandra McCracken
