= Melanie Wall =

American psychiatric biostatistician

Melanie Marie Wall (born 1971) is an American psychiatric biostatistician, psychometrician, and mental health data scientist who works at Columbia University as a professor in the departments of biostatistics and psychiatry, and as director of Mental Health Data Science, a joint project of the Columbia University Department of Psychiatry, Columbia University Medical Center, Research Foundation for Mental Hygiene, and New York State Psychiatric Institute. Her research has included topics such as grief and depression, eating disorders, marijuana use and abuse, and correlations between school performance and athletic activity, studied using latent variable models, spatial analysis, and longitudinal data. She is co-editor of the book Surviving Vietnam: Psychological Consequences of the War for US Veterans (Oxford University Press, 2018).

== Education and career ==
Wall was born on October 21, 1971, in St. Louis, Missouri, in a working-class family; she attended public school, and supported herself in college at Truman State University through multiple part-time jobs. She majored in mathematics there, graduating in 1993. She went to Iowa State University, intending to do graduate study in mathematics, but switched to statistics after a semester. She earned a master's degree there in 1995 and completing her Ph.D. in 1998. Her dissertation, On nonlinear structural equation analysis, was supervised by Yasuo Amemiya.

After completing her doctorate, she joined the University of Minnesota as an assistant professor of biostatistics in 1998, earned tenure there in 2004, and became a full professor in 2010, the same year in which she moved to Columbia University. At Columbia, she headed the Division of Biostatistics and Data Coordination in the Department of Psychiatry from 2012 to 2017, and after leading the effort to rename the division to Mental Health Data Science in 2018, has continued to direct it since then.

== Recognition ==
Wall was elected as a Fellow of the American Statistical Association in 2014.

== Selected works ==
- Co-editor, Surviving Vietnam: Psychological Consequences of the War for US Veterans (2019) ISBN 978-0190904449
