= Melanie Nerlich =

German politician (born 1993)

Member of the Hamburg Parliament
- Incumbent
- Assumed office 26 March 2025

Personal details
- Born: 1993 (age 32–33)
- Party: Alliance 90/The Greens (since 2020)

Melanie Nerlich (born 1993) is a German politician serving as a member of the Hamburg Parliament since 2025. From 2021 to 2022, she was an Ortsbezirk councillor of Frankfurt-Innenstadt II.
