= Melanie Schmidt =

German computer scientist

Melanie Schmidt is a German computer scientist whose research involves algorithms for cluster analysis, including approximation algorithms, coresets, algorithmic fairness, and inapproximability. She holds the chair for Algorithms and Data Structures in the Computer Science Department at Heinrich Heine University Düsseldorf.

== Education and career ==
Schmidt earned a diploma in computer science in 2009 through study at both the Technical University of Dortmund and the University of Verona in Italy. She continued at the Technical University of Dortmund for doctoral study in computer science, and completed her doctorate (Dr. rer. nat.) in 2014 with the dissertation Coresets and streaming algorithms for the $k$-means problem and related clustering objectives, jointly supervised by Christian Sohler, Johannes Blömer, and Gernot Fink.

After postdoctoral research at Carnegie Mellon University in the US and at the University of Bonn, she took a position at the University of Cologne in 2019 as junior professor of machine learning. She moved to her present position in Düsseldorf in 2021.

== Selected publications ==
- Lee, Euiwoong; Schmidt, Melanie; Wright, John (2017), "Improved and simplified inapproximability for $k$-means", Information Processing Letters, 120: 40–43, arXiv:1509.00916, doi:10.1016/J.IPL.2016.11.009
- Rösner, Clemens; Schmidt, Melanie (2018), "Privacy preserving clustering with constraints", in Chatzigiannakis, Ioannis; Kaklamanis, Christos; Marx, Dániel; Sannella, Donald (eds.), 45th International Colloquium on Automata, Languages, and Programming, ICALP 2018, July 9–13, 2018, Prague, Czech Republic, LIPIcs, vol. 107, Schloss Dagstuhl – Leibniz-Zentrum für Informatik, pp. 96:1–96:14, doi:10.4230/LIPICS.ICALP.2018.96, ISBN 978-3-95977-076-7, S2CID 3343460
- Schmidt, Melanie; Schwiegelshohn, Chris; Sohler, Christian (2019), "Fair coresets and streaming algorithms for fair $k$-means", in Bampis, Evripidis; Megow, Nicole (eds.), Approximation and Online Algorithms – 17th International Workshop, WAOA 2019, Munich, Germany, September 12–13, 2019, Revised Selected Papers, Lecture Notes in Computer Science, vol. 11926, Springer, pp. 232–251, doi:10.1007/978-3-030-39479-0_16, ISBN 978-3-030-39478-3, S2CID 57189168
- Feldman, Dan; Schmidt, Melanie; Sohler, Christian (2020), "Turning big data into tiny data: Constant-size coresets for $k$-means, PCA, and projective clustering", SIAM Journal on Computing, 49 (3): 601–657, arXiv:1807.04518, doi:10.1137/18M1209854; previously announced at the 2013 ACM–SIAM Symposium on Discrete Algorithms (SODA)
