= Melanie Roberts (disambiguation) =

Melanie Roberts (born 1988) is a Welsh retired gymnast.

Melanie Roberts may also refer to:

- Melanie Roberts-Radgman, Trinidad and Tobago politician
- Melanie Roberts, see Tameside Council election, 2007

== Fictional characters ==
- Melanie Roberts, in the 1995 US science fiction horror film Village of the Damned, played by Meredith Salenger

== See also ==
- Mel Roberts (1943–2007), American MLB player, coach, and manager
