= Melanie Nathan =

South African-born attorney, mediator, equality activist and human rights advocate

Melanie Nathan is a South African-born attorney, a mediator, equality activist, and human rights advocate, who advocates, speaks and writes on issues impacting LGBTI communities around the world, with a focus on the United States and Africa.

Nathan immigrated to the U.S. in 1985. She publishes the LGBTI advocacy blog O-Blog-Dee-O-Blog-Da (Life goes on...). She is the executive director of the African Human Rights Coalition (African HRC). She was appointed a community grand marshal for San Francisco Pride 2014, in recognition of her global human rights advocacy work for LGBTI people. She is also a director of the Peacemaker Museum World Tour.

She is co-producing Armagayddon, described as "a documentary that exposes the historical anti-gay crusades of right-wing movements and their influence on the Republican Party through a critical examination of national figures, social movements, and conservative organizations and think tanks, focusing on the anti-gay rhetoric and policies of the Republican Party, as well as the use of homosexuality as a political weapon and wedge issue."

Nathan was tangentially involved in the outing of two straight men who had been masquerading online as Lesbians, after one of them rebuked Nathan online. In 2018, a speaking engagement age was to give was cancelled because of her criticism of Donald J. Trump.
