= Melanie Wildman =

Canadian business woman (born 1974)

- Born: August 31, 1974 (age 51)
- Occupation: Businesswoman
- Known for: Mrs. Canada, CEO of WLF Medical
- Website: wlfmedical.ca

Melanie Wildman (born August 31, 1974) is a businesswoman, entrepreneur and beauty pageant winner. She won the Mrs Canada pageant in 2014.

== Professional career ==
Melanie Wildman founded Weight Loss Forever (WLF) Medical, a bariatric center, after having a similar procedure herself in April 2009, performed by a Mexican doctor, which she felt was a negative experience.

== Beauty pageants ==
Wildman was crowned Mrs. Canada International in December 2010 and was the first runner-up in the Mrs. Universe pageant in Aruba in 2013. In 2013, she went on to win the Mrs. Canada title. She was listed among the 11 finalists who made it to the Mrs. World Pageant's finals in November 2013.

Wildman performed in the January 2014 Swinging with the Stars charity fundraiser with Braiden Stevenson.

She has appeared on the covers of Fine Lifestyles Saskatoon, Obesity Help Magazine and Saskatoon Business Magazine.

Wildman is the publisher of a health and beauty magazine, Canadian Health, and has appeared on its cover as well.
