= Melanie Ooi =

New Zealand instrumentation-and-measurement engineer

- Education: Monash University (PhD, 2011)
- Known for: Measurement-uncertainty frameworks; light-based weed-detection systems
- Awards: Rutherford Discovery Fellowship (2019), IET Mike Sargeant Career Achievement Award (2017), IEEE I&M Outstanding Young Engineer Award (2014)
- Scientific career
- Fields: Instrumentation and measurement engineering; mechatronics; computational intelligence
- Workplaces: University of Waikato, Unitec Institute of Technology, Monash University, Heriot-Watt University

Melanie Ooi is an instrumentation and measurement engineer and associate professor in the School of Engineering at the University of Waikato, where she also serves as assistant dean (Research). Her research couples advanced instrumentation with machine-vision and computational-intelligence methods, and her test-data techniques have been adopted by multinational semiconductor companies.

== Early life and education ==
Ooi received her PhD in electronic engineering from Monash University in 2011.

== Career ==
After academic appointments at Monash University and Heriot-Watt University Malaysia, Ooi joined Unitec Institute of Technology (Auckland) in 2017 and moved to the University of Waikato the following year.

She leads projects that apply hyperspectral imaging and tailored LED illumination for the real-time detection of invasive weeds such as ragwort, gorse and blackberry, enabling precision herbicide application in dairy pastures.

Ooi's frameworks for analytical propagation of measurement uncertainty have been incorporated into the South African National Accreditation System’s guideline TG 50-02.

In 2026, Ooi was appointed as a full professor at the University of Waikato.

== Professional service ==
She is a senior member of the IEEE, served on the Administrative Committee of the IEEE Instrumentation & Measurement Society (2019–2022), and was secretary of its Technical Committee on Fault-Tolerant Measurement Systems (TC-32). Ooi is also the youngest woman ever elected fellow of the Institution of Engineering and Technology.

== Awards ==
- Rutherford Discovery Fellowship, Royal Society Te Apārangi (2019)
- Mike Sargeant Career Achievement Award, Institution of Engineering and Technology (2017)
- Outstanding Young Engineer of the Year, IEEE Instrumentation & Measurement Society (2014)
- Excellence Award, International Education Association of Australia (2014)
- Citation for Outstanding Contributions to Student Learning, Australian Learning & Teaching Council (2011)

== Selected works ==
- Ooi M.-P-L. Analytical Evaluation of Uncertainty Propagation for Probabilistic Design Optimisation. IOP Publishing, 2023.
