= Angels Unlimited =

Young adults literature

- Cover of the first Angels Unlimited novel - Winging It
- Author: Annie Dalton
- Cover artist: Rian Hughes at Device
- Country: United Kingdom
- Language: English
- Genre: Fantasy
- Publisher: HarperCollins
- No. of books: 12

Angels Unlimited is the title of a series of novels written for teenagers by the British author Annie Dalton. The protagonist is Melanie Beeby, who died on the day after her thirteenth birthday and soon found herself at the Angel Academy in heaven. As of July 2013, there are twelve novels, three omnibus books, and now twelve updated and revised ebooks. The overall title of the series has also been changed to Angel Academy.

Books from the series have been translated into Czech, Danish, Dutch, Finnish, French, German, Hungarian, Indonesian, Italian, Japanese, Norwegian, Polish, Portuguese, and Swedish.

The books are written in first person from Mel's point of view and have a light, informal tone. In many of the books though, historical information is also present, due to the featuring of time travel to different periods of the past.

== Plot ==
Melanie Beeby is killed in a traffic accident on the day after her thirteenth birthday. She then finds herself transported to Heaven. The Heaven of this universe is a lively and vibrant city, populated both by dead humans-turned-angels and Heaven-born beings known as pure angels. This city is also where the headquarters of the Agency are situated. The Agency is an elite group whose job is to counter the Opposition, informally known as the PODs or Powers of Darkness – the polar opposite of the Agency.

Upon arrival, Mel discovers that she is to be a trainee at the Angel Academy. She also discovers a best friend and soulmate, Lola Sanchez, good friend Reuben Bird and on her first mission bad boy Brice de Winters.

Each book features time travel of some kind, where Mel is tasked by the Agency to unravel various celestial problems involving humans and the Opposition.

== Title changes ==
On 5 May 2005, the Angels Unlimited series was renamed the Agent Angel series, and new covers were released for each book.

From 21 June 2013 onwards, Amazon Kindle versions of the books were released under the series name Angel Academy, again with new covers being released for each edition.

== Books ==
=== Novels (in series order) ===
1. Winging It (1 January 2001)
2. Losing The Plot (2 July 2001)
3. Flying High (5 November 2001)
4. Calling the Shots (2 April 2002)
5. Fogging Over (5 August 2002)
6. Fighting Fit (6 January 2003)
7. Making Waves (3 November 2003)
8. Budding Star (4 May 2004)
9. Keeping It Real (23 September 2005)
10. Going For Gold (8 May 2007)
11. Feeling the Vibes (4 February 2008)
12. Living the Dream (2 July 2008)

=== Omnibus editions ===
- The Heavenly Collection (contains Winging It, Losing the Plot and Flying High) (4 November 2002)
- The Cosmic Collection (contains Calling the Shots, Fogging Over and Fighting Fit) (4 May 2004)
- The Divine Collection (contains Making Waves, Budding Star and Keeping It Real)
