= Melanie Clore =

Former auctioneer (b. 1960)

- Born: 1960 (age 65–66)
- Education: University of Manchester
- Occupations: Co-Founder, Clore Wyndham Fine Art Ltd, formerly Chairman, Sotheby's Europe
- Board member of: Trustee, Clore Duffield Foundation; Trustee, Royal Academy Trust
- Website: clorewyndham.com

Melanie Clore (born 1960) was the chairman of the auction house Sotheby's Europe between 2011 and 2016, and the worldwide co-chairman of Sotheby's Impressionist and Modern art department from 2000 to 2016. In September 2016, Melanie Clore and Henry Wyndham (also former chairman of Sotheby's Europe) launched an art advisory business, Clore Wyndham Fine Art. She is a Trustee of the Royal Academy Trust and a Trustee of the Clore Duffield Foundation.

== Career ==
Clore graduated from the University of Manchester with a degree in History of Art. She began her career at Sotheby's in 1981, working as a graduate trainee on the front counter and then as a junior cataloguer in the Impressionist and Modern art department. In 1985, Clore conducted her first auction and in the process became Sotheby's youngest ever female auctioneer.

Clore became the first female auctioneer to take a major evening sale of Impressionist and Modern art in 1990. In 2000 she became co-chairman worldwide of Impressionist and Modern art at Sotheby's.

In 2010, Clore presided over the sale in London of Alberto Giacometti's 'L'homme qui marche I' for $104.3 million, at the time the highest amount paid for a work at an auction.

In 2011, Clore became chairman of Sotheby's Europe alongside Henry Wyndham.

Sotheby's credit her with being "instrumental in the most successful sale ever to have taken place in London - the Impressionist, Modern & Surrealist Art Evening Sale in February 2015, which achieved £186.4 million".

Clore announced her departure from Sotheby's in February 2016. In September 2016, Melanie Clore and Henry Wyndham (also former chairman of Sotheby's Europe) launched an art advisory business, Clore Wyndham Fine Art. In November 2017, Dalya Alberge, in an article in the Financial Times on the role of specialist art advisors stated: "The best advisors can open doors to some of the most sought-after works. Melanie Clore and Henry Wyndham have an extraordinary network of contacts. They were joint chairpeople of Sotheby's Europe. Clore ran its Impressionst and Modern art; Wyndham was its chief auctioneer. They have now launched an advisory company in London, managing collections and orchestrating sales between collectors of the finest art."

The Prime Minister of the United Kingdom appointed Clore to the board of trustees of Tate in 2004. She has been an honorary member of the Tate Foundation since 2009.

In 2010 Clore became a trustee of the Clore Duffield Foundation, founded by Sir Charles Clore, which supports cultural learning, arts and heritage organisations and social care in the UK. She is a trustee of the Royal Academy Trust which supports the Royal Academy of Arts.

She was a trustee of the Whitechapel Gallery from 1988 until 1999.

== Personal life ==
She is married to Yaron Meshoulam. They have two children and live in London.
