= Melanie Moore (disambiguation) =

Melanie Moore may refer to:

- Melanie Moore (born 1991), American professional dancer and actress; winner of So You Think You Can Dance season 8
- Melanie Moore (basketball), American women's basketball coach at Xavier University
- Melanie Paxson (née Moore), American actress
