= Melanie Backe-Hansen =

British house historian

Melanie Backe-Hansen is a British house historian and a Fellow of the Royal Society of Arts. She is a research consultant for the BBC television programme, A House Through Time.

Backe-Hansen is a Fellow of the Royal Society of Arts and a Member of the Royal Historical Society.

== Selected publications ==
- (with Cath Harries) Doors of London (2024), Sheldrake Press, 256 pp, ISBN 978-1873329528
- (with David Olusoga) A House Through Time (2020), Picador, 304 pp, ISBN 978-1529037241
- House Histories: The Secrets Behind Your Front Door (2011), The History Press, 240 pp, ISBN 9780752457536;
  second edition (2019), 244 pp, ISBN 978-0750992305
- Historic Streets & Squares: The Secrets On Your Doorstep (The History Press, 2014) ISBN 9780752464299
