= Melanie Miller =

Melanie Miller may refer to:

- Melanie Benjamin (author) (born 1962), pen name of American writer Melanie Hauser, née Miller
- Melanie Miller (politician) (born 1986), American politician, member of the Ohio House of Representatives
- Melanie Miller (producer), American documentary film producer

== See also ==
- Mel Miller (disambiguation)
