= Melanie Notkin =

Melanie Notkin is a Canadian-American author known for coining the term “professional aunt, no kids” (PANKs), and founding the website SavvyAuntie.

== Career ==
Notkin coined the acronym PANK in 2008 after working as a marketing executive. She defined PANKs as women who love children but lack their own due to "circumstance, choice or challenge". In 2018, she conducted a study that found that nearly half of such women are childless by circumstance. Her initial interest in defining PANKs for marketing purposes evolved toward a means of social connection and self-affirmation, countering stereotypes like 'cold career woman' or 'irresponsible party girl' with the empowering recognition of an important maternal role.

Notkin founded a website for childless women who seek goods and experiences to share with the children of their siblings or friends. In Savvy Auntie: The Ultimate Guide for Cool Aunts, Great-Aunts, Godmothers, And All Women Who Love Kids, Notkin discussed how aunts can be allies to both kids and their parents. She recommended striking a "delicate balance between being a fun role model and a disciplinarian". She described herself as an 'auntrepreneur'.

Notkin's book Otherhood: Modern Women Finding a New Kind of Happiness chronicled what she called 'circumstantial infertility', encountered by single women who desire motherhood but only after finding a partner. She has advocated for sensitivity toward the 'disenfranchised grief' of childless single women who experience feelings of loss unbeknownst to others.

== Criticism ==
Notkin's use of the term 'other' was criticized by linguist Robin Lakoff as a misuse of irony for readers with 'irony deficiency anemia'. Some readers of Otherhood commented in online forums that Notkin's emphasis on childlessness by circumstance, rather than by choice, was off-putting. Notkin argued that her book put 'otherhood' in a positive light by freeing single childless women from allowing others to define them.

== Works ==
- Otherhood: Modern Women Finding a New Kind of Happiness (Seal Press, 2014) ISBN 978-1580055215
- Savvy Auntie: The Ultimate Guide for Cool Aunts, Great-Aunts, Godmothers and all Women Who Love Kids (Morrow, 2011) ISBN 978-0061999970
