= Melanie Janine Kanaka =

Sri Lankan management accountant professional

- Education: Bishop's College, Colombo
- Alma mater: Fellow of the Chartered Institute of Management Accountants; University of Sri Jayawardenepura; Emory University
- Occupations: business personality, accountant

Melanie Janine Kanaka, also known as Melanie Kanaka, is a Sri Lankan management accounting professional and business personality. She is the current Global President of the Chartered Institute of Management Accountants and also serves as the current head of Finance and Administration at the World Bank in Sri Lanka and the Maldives. In June 2022, she was appointed as the President of the Chartered Institute of Management Accountants.

== Biography ==
Kanaka was born to a Sri Lankan Malay father and Sinhalese Christian mother and hails from a middle class family.

== Career ==
Kanaka pursued her primary and secondary education at the Bishops’ College in Colombo. She obtained a first-class B. Com Hons degree from the University of Sri Jayawardenepura and an MBA in international finance and corporate strategy from Goizuetta Business School of Emory University, having received a Fulbright scholarship in order to pursue her higher studies at Emory.

Kanaka initially pursued a career in swimming, having competed at national swimming competitions. She also officiated as a staff member at the 1996 Summer Olympics. She later pursued a career in management accounting. She served on Sri Lanka Divisional Council for nine years and briefly served as the Divisional Vice President of CIMA Sri Lanka. She became a member of CIMA in 1992.

Kanaka was admitted to CIMA fellowship in 2000. She was invited to the CIMA Global Membership Board in 2009, becoming the first Sri Lankan, Asian, and non-British woman ever to be invited to the CIMA Global Membership Board. She was elected to the CIMA Council from the South Asian region in 2013 for a three-year term and served until 2016. During her first term, she served on the CIMA policy committees of Lifelong Learning, Member Services and Appointments in the UK.

In June 2017, she was invited by the CIMA Council to serve for a second three-year term with the institute from 2017 to 2020 as a co-opted member. In 2015, she was also elected to the CIMA’s Appointment Committee. She was elected as the Global Vice President of the Chartered Institute of Management Accountants with a majority vote of around 88% of the CIMA’s global members, with voting held during the 101st Annual General Meeting on 3 June 2020. Kanaka was the first Sri Lankan, Asian and non-British woman to hold this position.

Kanaka has also worked in finance roles at Hayleys, MAS Holdings and DFCC Bank. She has also worked as the director of the Association of International Certified Professional Accountants. She was a member on the audit committee of the International Planned Parenthood Federation for a period of two years, and currently serves as its chairperson. On 22 June 2022, she was promoted from Vice President to President of CIMA and subsequently became the first Asian woman ever to be elected as the President of CIMA. She became the 89th President of the CIMA. She was also unanimously selected to serve as Co-Chair of Association of International Certified Professional Accountants.
