= List of animated feature films released theatrically in the United States =

The list of Animated feature films released theatrically in the United States is split into:

- List of animated feature films released theatrically in the United States (1937–1999)
- List of animated feature films released theatrically in the United States (2000–2019)
- List of animated feature films released theatrically in the United States (2020–present)
