= List of animated feature films released theatrically in the United States (1937–1999) =

This list of theatrical animated feature films consists of animated films released theatrically, whether wide or limited, in the United States, between 1937 and 1999.

Made-for-TV and direct-to-video films will not be featured on this list, unless they have had a theatrical release in some form. Primarily live-action films with heavy use of special effects are also not included.

== Films ==
=== Released ===
Title	Release date	Accompanying short	Medium	Studio	Distributor	Running time (minutes)	Budget	Box office	Note
The Academy Award Review of Walt Disney Cartoons	April 23, 1937 (matinee); May 19, 1937 (official release, released on a double-bill with Dreaming Lips)	—N/a	Traditional animation	Walt Disney Productions	United Artists	41	—N/a	—N/a	The first animated film from Walt Disney before Snow White and the Seven Dwarfs. Package film with Silly Symphony short films which won the Academy Award for Best Short Subject, Cartoons.
Snow White and the Seven Dwarfs	December 21, 1937 (Carthay Circle Theatre); February 4, 1938 (official release)	Fantasy on Skis (1975 re-issue)	Traditional animation	Walt Disney Productions	RKO Radio Pictures	83	$1,499,000	$66,596,803	The very first animated film from Walt Disney and the first Disney Princess. Winner of an Academy Honorary Award. Also adapted into a 2025 live-action remake.
Gulliver's Travels	December 22, 1939	—N/a	Traditional animation	Fleischer Studios	Paramount Pictures	76	$700,000	$3,270,000	The first animated film from Paramount Pictures, the first non-Disney animated film and the first animated film to be put in the public domain.
Pinocchio	February 7, 1940 (Center Theatre); February 23, 1940 (official release)	The Small One (1978 re-issue)	Traditional animation	Walt Disney Productions	RKO Radio Pictures	87	$2,289,247	$38,976,570	The second animated film from Walt Disney. Also adapted into a 2022 live-action remake of the same name.
Fantasia	November 13, 1940	Toot, Whistle, Plunk and Boom (1963 re-issue)	Traditional animation/Live action	Walt Disney Productions	RKO Radio Pictures	124	$2,280,000	$42,850,000	The third animated film from Walt Disney, the first Disney animated film to have live-action footage, the first animated film to feature Mickey Mouse, the first animated feature film to be presented in stereophonic surround sound and the first Disney package film.
The Reluctant Dragon	June 20, 1941	—N/a	Traditional animation/Live action	Walt Disney Productions	RKO Radio Pictures	73	$600,000	$960,000	The second Disney animated film with live-action.
Dumbo	October 23, 1941 (Broadway Theatre); October 31, 1941 (official release)	—N/a	Traditional animation	Walt Disney Productions	RKO Radio Pictures	64	$950,000	$1,300,000	The fourth animated film from Walt Disney. Also adapted into a 2019 live-action remake of the same name.
Mr. Bug Goes to Town	December 5, 1941 (official release); February 13, 1942 (California); February 20, 1942 (New York City)	—N/a	Traditional animation	Fleischer Studios	Paramount Pictures	78	$1,000,000	$241,000	The second animated film from Paramount Pictures.
Bambi	August 9, 1942 (London); August 13, 1942 (Radio City Music Hall); August 21, 1942 (official release)	Alaskan Sled Dog (1957 re-issue)	Traditional animation	Walt Disney Productions	RKO Radio Pictures	70	$858,000	$168,200,000	The fifth animated film from Walt Disney. Inspired a 2006 sequel, Bambi II.
Saludos Amigos	August 24, 1942 (Rio de Janeiro); February 6, 1943 (Majestic Theatre, Boston); February 19, 1943 (official release)	Seal Island (1949 re-issue)	Traditional animation/Live-action	Walt Disney Productions	RKO Radio Pictures	42	$515,000	$1,135,000	The sixth animated film from Walt Disney, the third Disney animated film with live-action, the first animated film to feature Donald Duck and Goofy and the second Disney package film.
Victory Through Air Power	July 17, 1943 (Globe Theatre)	—N/a	Traditional animation/Live-action	Walt Disney Productions	United Artists	70	$788,000	$799,000	The fourth Disney animated film with live action and the first animated documentary film.
The Three Caballeros	December 21, 1944 (Mexico City); February 3, 1945 (official release)	—N/a	Traditional animation/Live-action	Walt Disney Productions	RKO Radio Pictures	72	—N/a	$3,355,000	A sequel to Saludos Amigos, the seventh animated film from Walt Disney, the fifth Disney animated film with live action, the third Disney package film and the first film to incorporate traditional animation with live action actors.
Make Mine Music	April 20, 1946 (Globe Theatre); August 15, 1946 (official release)	—N/a	Traditional animation	Walt Disney Productions	RKO Radio Pictures	68	$1,035,000	$3,275,000	The eighth animated film from Walt Disney and the fourth Disney package film. Entered into the 1946 Cannes Film Festival.
Song of the South	November 12, 1946 (Fox Theatre); November 20, 1946 (official release)	—N/a	Traditional animation/Live-action	Walt Disney Productions	RKO Radio Pictures	94	$2,125,000	$65,000,000	The sixth Disney animated film with live-action.
Fun and Fancy Free	September 27, 1947	—N/a	Traditional animation/Live-action	Walt Disney Productions	RKO Radio Pictures	74	—N/a	$3,165,000	The ninth animated film from Walt Disney, the seventh Disney animated film with live-action and the fifth Disney package film.
Melody Time	May 27, 1948	—N/a	Traditional animation/Live-action	Walt Disney Productions	RKO Radio Pictures	75	$1,500,000	$2,560,000	The 10th animated film from Walt Disney, the eighth Disney animated film with live action and the sixth Disney package film.
So Dear to My Heart	November 29, 1948 (Chicago); January 19, 1949 (Indiana Theatre)	—N/a	Traditional animation/Live-action	Walt Disney Productions	RKO Radio Pictures	82	$1,500,000	$3,700,000	The ninth Disney animated film with live-action.
The Adventures of Ichabod and Mr. Toad	August 25, 1949 (private premiere at RKO Palace Theatre, hosted by Sally Joy Brown); October 5, 1949 (official release)	—N/a	Traditional animation	Walt Disney Productions	RKO Radio Pictures	68	—N/a	$1,625,000	The 11th animated film from Walt Disney and the seventh Disney package film.
Cinderella	February 15, 1950 (RKO Keith's Memorial Theatre); February 22, 1950 (Mayfair Theatre); March 30, 1950 (official release)	—N/a	Traditional animation	Walt Disney Productions	RKO Radio Pictures	74	$2,900,000	$10,000,000	The 12th animated film from Walt Disney and the second Disney Princess. Also inspired two direct-to-video sequels in 2002 and 2007. Adapted into a 2015 live-action remake of the same name.
Alice in Wonderland	July 26, 1951 (London); July 28, 1951 (Criterion Theatre)	Nature's Half Acre	Traditional animation	Walt Disney Productions	RKO Radio Pictures	75	$3,000,000	$5,600,000	The 13th animated film from Walt Disney. Also adapted into a 2010 live-action remake of the same name and its 2016 sequel.
Peter Pan	February 5, 1953 (Balaban and Katz)	Bear Country	Traditional animation	Walt Disney Productions	RKO Radio Pictures	76	$4,000,000	$7,000,000	The 14th animated film from Walt Disney, the final Disney film to be distributed by RKO, and the final Disney film in which all nine members of Disney's Nine Old Men worked as directing animators. Entered into the 1953 Cannes Film Festival. Adapted into a 2023 live-action remake, Peter Pan & Wendy.
Johnny the Giant Killer	June 5, 1953	—N/a	Traditional animation	Jean Image Films	Lippert Pictures	80	—N/a	—N/a	The first animated film from Lippert Pictures.
Hansel and Gretel: An Opera Fantasy	October 10, 1954	—N/a	Stop motion	RKO Radio Pictures		72	—N/a	—N/a	The first American non-Disney animated film since Mr. Bug Goes to Town and the first American feature-length animated film not made with traditional animation.
Animal Farm	December 29, 1954 (New York City); January 7, 1955 (London)	—N/a	Traditional animation	Halas and Batchelor	Distributors Corporation of America	72	$350,000	—N/a	The first animated film from Distributors Corporation of America, the first adult animated film and the first British animated film ever made (save for two instructional films).
Lady and the Tramp	June 16, 1955 (Balaban and Katz); June 22, 1955 (official release)	—N/a	Traditional animation	Walt Disney Productions	Buena Vista Film Distribution	76	$4,000,000	$36,359,037	The 15th animated film from Walt Disney and the first animated film to be presented in the CinemaScope widescreen process. Also inspired a 2001 direct-to-video sequel. Adapted into a 2019 live-action remake of the same name.
Sleeping Beauty	January 29, 1959 (Fox Wilshire Theatre)	—N/a	Traditional animation	Walt Disney Productions	Buena Vista Film Distribution	75	$6,000,000	$36,479,805	The 16th animated film from Walt Disney, the third Disney Princess and the first animated film to be presented in the Super Technirama 70 widescreen process. Also inspired the live-action media franchise Maleficent.
1001 Arabian Nights	December 1, 1959	—N/a	Traditional animation	UPA	Columbia Pictures	75	$2,000,000	—N/a	The first animated film from Columbia Pictures and the first animated film from UPA.
The Snow Queen	March 30, 1960 (RKO Albee Theatre, Brooklyn)	—N/a	Traditional animation	Soyuzmultfilm	Universal Pictures	68	—N/a	—N/a	The first animated film from Universal Pictures. Also marked the first purchase of a Soviet film by an American company.
One Hundred and One Dalmatians	January 25, 1961 (Florida Theatre)	—N/a	Traditional animation	Walt Disney Productions	Buena Vista Distribution	79	$3,600,000	$85,000,000	The 17th animated film from Walt Disney and the first animated film to use the xerography process. Also adapted into two live-action remakes (101 Dalmatians, 102 Dalmatians). It inspired a 2003 direct-to-video sequel and a 2021 live-action spin-off.
Magic Boy	June 22, 1961	—N/a	Anime	Toei Animation	Metro-Goldwyn-Mayer	83	—N/a	—N/a	The first animated film from Metro-Goldwyn-Mayer, and the very first anime film released in the United States.
Panda and the Magic Serpent	July 8, 1961	—N/a	Anime	Toei Animation	Global Pictures	78	—N/a	—N/a	The first animated film from Global Pictures.
Alakazam the Great	July 26, 1961	—N/a	Anime	Toei Animation	American International Pictures	88	—N/a	—N/a	The first animated film from American International Pictures.
A Midsummer Night's Dream	December 18, 1961	—N/a	Stop motion	Studio Kresleného a Loutkového Filmu	Showcorporation	76	—N/a	—N/a	The first animated film from Showcorporation and the first puppet kinescope in the world.
Gay Purr-ee	October 24, 1962	—N/a	Traditional animation	UPA	Warner Bros. Pictures	85	—N/a	—N/a	The first animated film from Warner Bros. Pictures and the second animated film from UPA.
The Sword in the Stone	December 25, 1963	Winnie the Pooh and a Day for Eeyore (1983 re-issue)	Traditional animation	Walt Disney Productions	Buena Vista Distribution	79	$3,000,000	$22,200,000	The 18th animated film from Walt Disney and the last Disney animated film released during Walt Disney's lifetime.
The Little Prince and the Eight-Headed Dragon	January 1, 1964	—N/a	Anime	Toei Animation	Columbia Pictures	86	—N/a	—N/a	The second animated film from Columbia Pictures.
The Incredible Mr. Limpet	January 20, 1964 (Weeki Wachee Springs Underwater Theater); March 28, 1964 (official release)	Dr. Devil and Mr. Hare	Traditional animation/Live-action	Warner Bros. Pictures		99	—N/a	—N/a	The first Warner Bros. animated film with live-action.
Of Stars and Men	April 28, 1964 (Beekman Theatre); May 13, 1964 (official release)	A collection of Hubley/UPA shorts	Traditional animation	Hubley Productions	Brandon Films	53	—N/a	—N/a	The first animated film from Brandon Films.
Hey There, It's Yogi Bear!	June 3, 1964	—N/a	Traditional animation	Hanna-Barbera Productions	Columbia Pictures	89	$2,438,233	$1,130,000	The third animated film from Columbia Pictures, the first animated film from Hanna-Barbera and the first animated feature-length film to be based on a television series. Was re-released by Clubhouse Pictures in 1986.
Mary Poppins	August 27, 1964 (Grauman's Chinese Theatre); September 24, 1964 (Radio City Music Hall)	—N/a	Traditional animation/Live-action	Walt Disney Productions	Buena Vista Distribution	139	$6,000,000	$31,000,000	The 10th Disney animated film with live-action. Nominee of an Academy Award for Best Picture.
The Man from Button Willow	April 3, 1965	—N/a	Traditional animation	Eagle Films	United Screen Arts	81	—N/a	—N/a	The first animated film from United Screen Arts.
Willy McBean and His Magic Machine	June 23, 1965	—N/a	Stop motion	Videocraft International; Dentsu Motion Pictures	Magna Pictures Distribution Corporation	94	—N/a	—N/a	The first animated film from Magna Pictures Distribution Corporation and the first animated theatrical feature-length film from Rankin/Bass.
The Magic World of Topo Gigio	November 26, 1965	—N/a	Stop-motion/Live-action	Cinecidi; Jolly Film; Sullivan Enterprises	Columbia Pictures	75	—N/a	—N/a	The fourth animated film from Columbia Pictures and the first Columbia animated film with live-action.
Pinocchio in Outer Space	December 22, 1965	—N/a	Traditional animation	Belvision Studios	Universal Pictures	65	—N/a	—N/a	The second animated film from Universal Pictures.
Alice of Wonderland in Paris	February 5, 1966	White Mane	Traditional animation	Childhood Productions		52	—N/a	—N/a	Was re-released by Paramount Pictures in the 1970s as Alice in a New Wonderland.
The Daydreamer	June 1, 1966	—N/a	Stop-motion/Live-action	Videocraft International	Embassy Pictures	101	$2,000,000	—N/a	The first animated film from Embassy Pictures and the second animated film from Rankin/Bass.
Gulliver's Travels Beyond the Moon	July 23, 1966	—N/a	Anime	Toei Animation	Continental Distributing	85	—N/a	—N/a	The first animated film from Continental Distributing, Inc.
The Man Called Flintstone	August 3, 1966	—N/a	Traditional animation	Hanna-Barbera Productions	Columbia Pictures	89	—N/a	—N/a	The fifth animated film from Columbia Pictures and the second animated film from Hanna-Barbera.
Mad Monster Party?	March 8, 1967	—N/a	Stop motion	Rankin/Bass Productions	Embassy Pictures	95	—N/a	—N/a	The second animated film from Embassy Pictures and the third animated film from Rankin/Bass.
The Wacky World of Mother Goose	September 27, 1967	—N/a	Traditional animation	Rankin/Bass Productions; Toei Animation	Embassy Pictures	81	—N/a	—N/a	The third animated film from Embassy Pictures and the fourth animated film from Rankin/Bass.
The Jungle Book	October 18, 1967 (Grauman's Chinese Theatre, released on a double-bill with Charlie, the Lonesome Cougar)	—N/a	Traditional animation	Walt Disney Productions	Buena Vista Distribution	78	$4,000,000	$137,741,048	The 19th animated film from Walt Disney and the last Disney animated film that Walt Disney produced. Also adapted into two live-action remakes of the same name, one 1994, the other in 2016.
Yellow Submarine	July 17, 1968 (United Kingdom); October 2, 1968 (Chicago International Film Festival); November 12, 1968 (County Museum of Art); November 13, 1968 (official release)	—N/a	Traditional animation	Apple Films; King Features Syndicate; TVC London	United Artists	90	$1–1.7 million	$9,000,000+	The third animated film from United Artists and the first since 1943's Victory Through Air Power. Released in two versions. Distribution rights later went to Metro-Goldwyn-Mayer.
A Boy Named Charlie Brown	December 4, 1969 (Radio City Music Hall)	—N/a	Traditional animation	Cinema Center Films; Lee Mendelson Films; United Feature Syndicate	National General Pictures	86	$1,100,000	$12,000,000	The first animated film from National General Pictures and the first animated film to feature Charlie Brown and the Peanuts gang.
Santa and the Three Bears	November 7, 1970	—N/a	Traditional animation/Live action	Tony Benedict Productions; Key Industries	R&S Film Enterprises	46	—N/a	—N/a	The first animated film from R&S Film Enterprises, Inc. and the first animated theatrical Christmas-themed film. Edited for television airings.
The Phantom Tollbooth	November 7, 1970	—N/a	Traditional animation/Live action	MGM Animation/Visual Arts	Metro-Goldwyn-Mayer	89	—N/a	—N/a	The second animated film from Metro-Goldwyn-Mayer and the first MGM animated film with live-action.
The Aristocats	December 11, 1970 (Westwood Village Theatre); December 25, 1970 (official release)	Niok the Orphan Elephant	Traditional animation	Walt Disney Productions	Buena Vista Distribution	78	$4,000,000	$28,000,000	The 20th animated film from Walt Disney and the last Disney animated film to be personally approved by Walt Disney himself.
The World of Hans Christian Andersen	March 1, 1971	—N/a	Anime	Toei Animation	United Artists	73	—N/a	—N/a	The fourth animated film from United Artists and the first anime film released in the United States since Gulliver's Travels Beyond the Moon.
Shinbone Alley	June 26, 1970 (Atlanta Film Festival); April 7, 1971 (official release)	—N/a	Traditional animation	Fine Arts Films	Allied Artists	84	—N/a	—N/a	The first animated film from Allied Artists.
Bedknobs and Broomsticks	October 7, 1971 (United Kingdom); November 11, 1971 (Radio City Music Hall); November 19, 1971 (official release)	—N/a	Traditional animation/Live-action	Walt Disney Productions	Buena Vista Distribution	117	$6,300,000	$8,500,000	The 11th Disney animated film with live-action. Restored in 1996 with 20 minutes of deleted content edited back into the film.
Fritz the Cat	April 12, 1972	—N/a	Traditional animation	Bakshi Productions; Fritz Productions; Aurica Finance Company; Krantz Films	Cinemation Industries	78	$700,000	$90,000,000	The first animated from Ralph Bakshi, the first animated film from Cinemation Industries, the first adult animated film since Animal Farm and the first animated film to receive an X rating in the United States.
Cleopatra: Queen of Sex	April 24, 1972	—N/a	Anime	Mushi Production	Xanadu Productions	112	—N/a	—N/a	The first animated film from Xanadu Productions.
Snoopy Come Home	August 9, 1972	—N/a	Traditional animation	Cinema Center Films; Lee Mendelson Films; United Feature Syndicate	National General Pictures	80	$1,000,000	$245,073	A sequel to A Boy Named Charlie Brown and the second animated film from National General Pictures.
Journey Back to Oz	December 14, 1972 (United Kingdom)	—N/a	Traditional animation	Filmation	Seymour Borde	88	—N/a	—N/a	The first animated film from Filmation and the first animated film adaptation of the Oz books to hit the big screen. Was not released in the United States until 1974.
Charlotte's Web	February 22, 1973 (Radio City Music Hall); March 1, 1973 (official release)	The Headless Horseman of Sleepy Hollow	Traditional animation	Hanna-Barbera Productions; Sagittarius Productions	Paramount Pictures	94	—N/a	$2,400,000	The third animated film from Paramount Pictures and the third animated film from Hanna-Barbera. Also inspired a 2003 direct-to-video sequel and a 2006 live-action film adaptation of the same name.
Marco Polo Junior Versus the Red Dragon	April 12, 1973	—N/a	Traditional animation	Animation International; Porter Animations	British Empire Films	82	$650,000	—N/a	The first Australian animated film ever made.
Treasure Island	July 10, 1973	—N/a	Traditional animation	Filmation	Warner Bros. Pictures	87	$1,050,000	—N/a	The second animated film from Warner Bros. Pictures and the second animated film from Filmation.
Heavy Traffic	August 8, 1973	—N/a	Traditional animation/Live-action	Bakshi Productions; Steve Krantz Productions	American International Pictures	76	$950,000	$1,500,000	The second animated from Ralph Bakshi and the second animated film from American International Pictures.
Fantastic Planet	December 1, 1973	—N/a	Traditional animation	Les Films Armorial; Ceskoslovensky Filmexport	New World Pictures	71	—N/a	—N/a	The first animated film from New World Pictures. Entered into the 1973 Cannes Film Festival.
Robin Hood	November 8, 1973 (Radio City Music Hall); December 21, 1973 (official release)	Nature's Strangest Creatures	Traditional animation	Walt Disney Productions	Buena Vista Distribution	83	$5,000,000	$27,500,000	The 21st animated film from Walt Disney.
The Nine Lives of Fritz the Cat	June 26, 1974	—N/a	Traditional animation	Steve Krantz Productions; Cine Camera	American International Pictures	76	$1,500,000	—N/a	A sequel to Fritz the Cat and the third animated film from American International Pictures. Entered into the 1974 Cannes Film Festival.
Down and Dirty Duck	July 8, 1974 (Los Angeles)	—N/a	Traditional animation	Murakami-Wolf Productions	New World Pictures	70	$110,000	—N/a	The second animated film from New World Pictures.
Oliver Twist	July 10, 1974	—N/a	Traditional animation	Filmation	Warner Bros. Pictures	91	$1,050,000	—N/a	The third animated film from Warner Bros. Pictures and the third animated film from Filmation.
Tubby the Tuba	April 1, 1975	—N/a	Traditional animation	New York Institute of Technology	AVCO Embassy Pictures	81	—N/a	—N/a	The fourth animated film from AVCO Embassy Pictures.
Aladdin and His Magic Lamp	July 1, 1975	—N/a	Traditional animation	Jean Image Films	Paramount Pictures	71	—N/a	—N/a	The fourth animated film from Paramount Pictures.
Coonskin	August 20, 1975	—N/a	Traditional animation/Live action	Bakshi Productions; Albert S. Ruddy Productions	Bryanston Distributing Company	84	$1,600,000	—N/a	The third animated film from Ralph Bakshi and the first animated film from Bryanston Distributing Company.
Bugs Bunny: Superstar	December 19, 1975	—N/a	Traditional animation/Live action	Hare-Raising Films	United Artists	90	—N/a	—N/a	The fifth animated film from United Artists and the first animated film to feature Bugs Bunny and other Looney Tunes characters. A compilation of nine previously released cartoons edited into one film.
Jack and the Beanstalk	February 13, 1976	—N/a	Anime	Group TAC; Nippon Herald Films	Columbia Pictures	96	—N/a	—N/a	The sixth animated film from Columbia Pictures.
Hugo the Hippo	June 16, 1976	—N/a	Traditional animation	Brut Productions; Pannonia Film Studio	20th Century Fox	91	$1,000,000	—N/a	The first animated film from 20th Century Fox.
Once Upon a Girl	September 10, 1976	—N/a	Traditional animation/Live action	Concelation a Girl; Tommy J. Productions	Severin Films	80	—N/a	—N/a	The first animated pornographic film.
Once Upon a Time	October 30, 1976	—N/a	Traditional animation	Rolf Kauka Films; Gamma Films	G.G. Communications	78	—N/a	—N/a	The first animated film from G.G. Communications.
Wizards	February 9, 1977	—N/a	Traditional animation	Bakshi Productions	20th Century Fox	81	$2,000,000	$9,000,000	The fourth animated film from Ralph Bakshi and the second animated film from 20th Century Fox.
The Many Adventures of Winnie the Pooh	March 11, 1977 (released on a double-bill with The Littlest Horse Thieves)	—N/a	Traditional animation	Walt Disney Productions	Buena Vista Distribution	74	—N/a	—N/a	The 22nd animated film from Walt Disney and the eighth Disney package film. Contains three previously released featurettes (Winnie the Pooh and the Honey Tree, Winnie the Pooh and the Blustery Day, and Winnie the Pooh and Tigger Too. It inspired five direct-to-video sequels (Pooh's Grand Adventure: The Search for Christopher Robin, Seasons of Giving, A Very Merry Pooh Year, Springtime with Roo, and Pooh's Heffalump Halloween Movie).
Raggedy Ann & Andy: A Musical Adventure	April 1, 1977	—N/a	Traditional animation/Live-action	Bobbs-Merrill Company; Richard Williams Productions	20th Century Fox	85	$4,000,000	$1,350,000	The first animated film from Richard Williams, the third animated film from 20th Century Fox and the first Fox animated film with live action.
Fantastic Animation Festival	May 27, 1977	—N/a	Traditional animation/Stop-motion	Voyage Productions	Cinema Shares International Distribution	90	—N/a	—N/a	The first animated film from Cinema Shares International Distribution.
The Rescuers	June 22, 1977 (released on a double-bill with A Tale of Two Critters)	Mickey's Christmas Carol (1983 re-issue)	Traditional animation	Walt Disney Productions	Buena Vista Distribution	77	$7,500,000	$48,000,000	The 23rd animated film from Walt Disney.
Race for Your Life, Charlie Brown	August 3, 1977 (New York); August 24, 1977 (everywhere else)	—N/a	Traditional animation	Bill Melendez Productions; Lee Mendelson Films; United Feature Syndicate	Paramount Pictures	76	$3,200,000		A sequel to A Boy Named Charlie Brown and Snoopy Come Home, and the fifth animated film from Paramount Pictures.
The Magic Pony	November 16, 1977	—N/a	Traditional animation	Soyuzmultfilm	Action Films	73	—N/a	—N/a	A remake of The Humpbacked Horse and the first animated film from Action Films.
The Mouse and His Child	November 23, 1977	—N/a	Traditional animation/Anime	Murakami-Wolf-Swenson	Sanrio	83	$1,600,000	—N/a	The first animated film from Sanrio.
Pete's Dragon	November 3, 1977 (Radio City Music Hall); December 16, 1977 (official release)	Ferdinand the Bull	Traditional animation/Live-action	Walt Disney Productions	Buena Vista Distribution	128	$10,000,000	$16,100,000	The 12th Disney animated film with live-action and the first animated film to be presented in Dolby Stereo. Adapted into a 2016 live-action remake.
Metamorphoses	May 3, 1978	—N/a	Traditional animation/Anime	Sanrio		80	—N/a	—N/a	The second animated film from Sanrio. Was re-released in the fall of 1979 as Winds of Change.
Watership Down	October 19, 1978 (United Kingdom); November 8, 1978 (official release)	—N/a	Traditional animation	Nepenthe Productions	AVCO Embassy Pictures	92	$2,400,000	—N/a	The first animated film from Nepenthe Productions and the fifth animated film from AVCO Embassy Pictures.
The Lord of the Rings	November 15, 1978	—N/a	Rotoscoping	Fantasy Films	United Artists	133	$4,000,000	$30,500,000	The fifth animated film from Ralph Bakshi and the sixth animated film from United Artists. Served as inspiration for Peter Jackson's The Lord of the Rings film series.
The Water Babies	June 23, 1978 (United Kingdom); June 15, 1979 (official release)	—N/a	Traditional animation/Live-action	Ariadne Films; Studio Minitaur Filmowych	The Samuel Goldwyn Company	105	$1,000,000	—N/a	The first animated film from The Samuel Goldwyn Company.
Rudolph and Frosty's Christmas in July	July 1, 1979	—N/a	Stop-motion	Rankin/Bass Productions	AVCO Embassy Pictures	98	—N/a	—N/a	The sixth animated film from AVCO Embassy Pictures and the fifth animated film from Rankin/Bass. Was later aired as a holiday special.
Tarzoon: Shame of the Jungle	September 14, 1979	—N/a	Traditional animation	Société Nouvelle de Doublage SND; Valisa Films Productions	International Harmony	79	—N/a	—N/a	The first animated film from International Harmony.
The Bugs Bunny/Road Runner Movie	September 29, 1979 (New York Film Festival); September 30, 1979 (Guild 50th Theatre)	—N/a	Traditional animation	Chuck Jones Enterprises; Warner Bros. Cartoons	Warner Bros. Pictures	98	—N/a	$6,280	The fourth animated film from Warner Bros. Pictures and the first of five compilation films featuring the Looney Tunes characters.
Hans Christian Andersen's The Little Mermaid	October 19, 1979	—N/a	Anime	Toei Animation	G.G. Communications	70	—N/a	—N/a	The second animated film from G.G. Communications. Predated the Disney adaptation by more than 10 years.
Nutcracker Fantasy	November 21, 1979	—N/a	Stop-motion	Sanrio		82	—N/a	—N/a	The third animated film from Sanrio. Remade in 2014 as part of Hello Kitty's 40th anniversary celebration.
Galaxy Express 999	May 16, 1980	—N/a	Anime	Toei Animation	New World Pictures	91	—N/a	$40,253,018	The third animated film from New World Pictures and the first anime film to receive theatrical distribution in the United States after the establishment of anime fandom in that country.
Bon Voyage, Charlie Brown (and Don't Come Back!!)	May 23, 1980 (New York); May 30, 1980 (everywhere else)	—N/a	Traditional animation	Bill Melendez Productions; Lee Mendelson Films; United Feature Syndicate	Paramount Pictures	76	—N/a	$2,000,000	A sequel to A Boy Named Charlie Brown, Snoopy Come Home and Race for Your Life, Charlie Brown, and the sixth animated film from Paramount Pictures. Released to celebrate Charlie Brown's 30th anniversary.
I Go Pogo	August 1, 1980	—N/a	Stop motion	O.G.P.I. Possum Productions	21st Century Film Corporation	86	—N/a	—N/a	The first animated film from 21st Century Film Corporation and the first election-themed animated film.
Hurray for Betty Boop	November 21, 1980	—N/a	Traditional animation	Dan Dalton Productions; National Telefilm Associates	New Line Cinema	78	—N/a	—N/a	The first animated film from New Line Cinema and the first animated film to feature Betty Boop.
American Pop	February 13, 1981	—N/a	Rotoscoping	Bakshi Productions	Columbia Pictures	96	—N/a	—N/a	The sixth animated film from Ralph Bakshi and the seventh animated film from Columbia Pictures.
The Fox and the Hound	June 16, 1981 (Bloomingdale's); July 10, 1981 (official release)	Once Upon a Mouse	Traditional animation	Walt Disney Productions	Buena Vista Distribution	83	$12,000,000	$39,900,000	The 24th animated film from Walt Disney. Also inspired a 2006 direct-to-video sequel.
Heavy Metal	August 7, 1981	—N/a	Traditional animation	Guardian Trust Company; CFDC; Famous Players; Potterton Productions	Columbia Pictures	90	$9,300,000	$20,100,000	The eighth animated film from Columbia Pictures and the first Canadian animated feature to have a theatrical release in the United States. Also inspired a 2000 sequel, Heavy Metal 2000.
Grendel Grendel Grendel	November 7, 1981 (Chicago); April 11, 1982 (New York)	—N/a	Traditional animation	Victorian Film	Satori Corporation	88	$550,000	—N/a	The first animated film from Satori Corporation.
The Looney Looney Looney Bugs Bunny Movie	November 20, 1981 (New York); November 25, 1981 (everywhere else)	Knighty Knight Bugs	Traditional animation	Warner Bros. Animation	Warner Bros. Pictures	79	—N/a	—N/a	A sequel to The Bugs Bunny/Road Runner Movie and the fifth animated film from Warner Bros. Pictures.
The Secret of NIMH	July 1, 1982 (Edens Theatre, Chicago); July 2, 1982 (official release)	—N/a	Traditional animation	Don Bluth Productions; Aurora Productions	MGM/UA Entertainment	82	$7,000,000	$14,665,733	The first animated film from Don Bluth and the first animated film from MGM/UA Entertainment Company. Also inspired a 1998 direct-to-video sequel.
Pink Floyd – The Wall	July 14, 1982 (Empire Leicester Square); July 16, 1982 (United Kingdom); August 13, 1982 (official release)	—N/a	Traditional animation/Live-action	Goldcrest Films; Tin Blue Productions	MGM/UA Entertainment	95	$12,000,000	$22,244,207	The second animated film from MGM/UA Entertainment Company and the first animated film to be presented in Dolby Stereo 70mm six-track surround sound. Entered into the 1982 Cannes Film Festival.
Hey Good Lookin'	October 1, 1982 (New York); January 21, 1983 (Los Angeles)	—N/a	Traditional animation	Bakshi Productions	Warner Bros. Pictures	77	$1,500,000	—N/a	Originally finished in 1975. The seventh animated film from Ralph Bakshi and the sixth animated film from Warner Bros. Pictures.
The Wizard of Oz	October 6, 1982	—N/a	Anime	Topcraft	Alan Enterprises	78	—N/a	$612,300	An anime adaptation of The Wizard of Oz.
Heidi's Song	November 19, 1982	—N/a	Traditional animation	Hanna-Barbera Productions	Paramount Pictures	94	—N/a	$5,124,391	The seventh animated film from Paramount Pictures and the fourth animated film from Hanna-Barbera.
Bugs Bunny's 3rd Movie: 1001 Rabbit Tales	November 19, 1982	—N/a	Traditional animation	Warner Bros. Animation	Warner Bros. Pictures	74	—N/a	$78,350	A sequel to The Bugs Bunny/Road Runner Movie and The Looney Looney Looney Bugs Bunny Movie, and the sixth animated film from Warner Bros. Pictures.
The Last Unicorn	November 19, 1982	—N/a	Traditional animation	Rankin/Bass Productions; ITC Entertainment; Topcraft	Jensen Farley Pictures	93	—N/a	$6,455,330	The first animated film from Jensen Farley Pictures and the sixth animated film from Rankin/Bass.
Mighty Mouse in the Great Space Chase	December 10, 1982 (matinee)	—N/a	Traditional animation	Filmation; Viacom Productions	Children's Video Library	86	—N/a	—N/a	The fourth animated film from Filmation, and a re-edited version of the serialized The New Adventures of Mighty Mouse and Heckle & Jeckle episode, "The Great Space Chase".
Rock & Rule	April 15, 1983 (Boston)	—N/a	Traditional animation	Nelvana; CFDC; Famous Players; Canada Trust	MGM/UA Entertainment	81	$8,000,000	$30,379	The third animated film from MGM/UA Entertainment Company, the first animated film from Nelvana, the first animated film to feature CGI and the first Canadian animated film to be produced in English.
Twice Upon a Time	August 5, 1983	—N/a	Cutout animation	Korty Films; Lucasfilm; The Ladd Company	Warner Bros. Pictures	75	—N/a	—N/a	The seventh animated film from Warner Bros. Pictures and the first animated film from Lucasfilm.
Daffy Duck's Fantastic Island	August 5, 1983	—N/a	Traditional animation	Warner Bros. Animation	Warner Bros. Pictures	78	—N/a	—N/a	The eighth animated film from Warner Bros. Pictures and the first Looney Tunes compilation film to center on Daffy Duck instead of Bugs Bunny.
Fire and Ice	August 19, 1983 (limited release); August 26, 1983 (official release)	—N/a	Rotoscoping	Producers Sales Organization	20th Century Fox	82	$1,200,000	$860,000	The eighth animated film from Ralph Bakshi and the fourth animated film from 20th Century Fox.
The Smurfs and the Magic Flute	November 11, 1983 (matinee); November 23, 1983 (official release)	—N/a	Traditional animation	Éditions Dupuis; Belvision Studios	Atlantic Releasing Corporation	74	—N/a	$19,000,000	The first animated film from Atlantic Releasing Corporation. Originally released in 1976. Released in the US at the height of the TV show's popularity.
Gallavants	November 28, 1984	—N/a	Traditional animation	Marvel Productions	Shapiro Entertainment	95	—N/a	—N/a	The first animated film from Shapiro Entertainment.
The Plague Dogs	October 21, 1982 (United Kingdom); January 9, 1985 (official release)	—N/a	Traditional animation	Nepenthe Productions; Goldcrest Films	Embassy Pictures	85	—N/a	—N/a	The second animated film from Nepenthe Productions and the seventh animated film from Embassy Pictures.
Here Come the Littles	January 18, 1985 (limited release); May 24, 1985 (official release)	—N/a	Traditional animation	ABC Entertainment; DIC Entertainment; TMS Entertainment	Atlantic Releasing Corporation	72	—N/a	$6,565,359	The second animated film from Atlantic Releasing Corporation and the first animated film from DIC Entertainment.
The Secret of the Sword	March 22, 1985	—N/a	Traditional animation	Filmation	Atlantic Releasing Corporation	91	$2,000,000	$6,500,000	The third animated film from Atlantic Releasing Corporation and the fifth animated film from Filmation. Kicked off a trend of theatrical animated features based on toy lines during the mid-1980s. Was re-released by Kidtoon Films in 2006.
The Care Bears Movie	March 24, 1985 (Circle Avalon Theatre); March 29, 1985 (official release)	Strawberry Shortcake Meets the Berrykins	Traditional animation	Nelvana; American Greetings	The Samuel Goldwyn Company	76	$2,000,000	$22,934,622	The second animated film from The Samuel Goldwyn Company, the second animated film from Nelvana and the first animated film to feature Care Bears.
Warriors of the Wind	June 14, 1985	—N/a	Anime	Topcraft	New World Pictures	95	$1,736,714	$1,720,000	The fourth animated film from New World Pictures. Rights now owned by Studio Ghibli.
The Black Cauldron	July 9, 1985 (Radio City Music Hall); July 24, 1985 (official release)	Chips Ahoy	Traditional animation	Walt Disney Pictures; Walt Disney Feature Animation; Silver Screen Partners II	Buena Vista Distribution	80	$44,000,000	$21,288,692	The 25th animated film from Walt Disney Feature Animation. It was re-released in 1990 as Taran and the Magic Cauldron.
Rainbow Brite and the Star Stealer	November 16, 1985 (matinee)	—N/a	Traditional animation	DIC Entertainment	Warner Bros. Pictures	84	—N/a	$4,889,971	The ninth animated film from Warner Bros. Pictures and the second animated film from DIC Entertainment.
Starchaser: The Legend of Orin	November 22, 1985	—N/a	Traditional animation	Young Sung Production	Atlantic Releasing Corporation	100	$15,000,000	$3,360,800	The fourth animated film from Atlantic Releasing Corporation and the first animated feature film to be released in 3D.
The Adventures of Mark Twain	January 17, 1986	—N/a	Claymation	Will Vinton Productions; Harbour Town Films	Clubhouse Pictures	86	$1,500,000	$849,915	Launch films for Clubhouse Pictures.
Heathcliff: The Movie	January 17, 1986	—N/a	Traditional animation	DIC Entertainment	Clubhouse Pictures	70	—N/a	$2,610,686	Launch films for Clubhouse Pictures.
The Adventures of the American Rabbit	January 17, 1986	—N/a	Traditional animation	Murakami-Wolf-Swenson; Toei Animation	Clubhouse Pictures	82	—N/a	$1,268,443	Launch films for Clubhouse Pictures.
Care Bears Movie II: A New Generation	March 7, 1986 (limited release); March 21, 1986 (official release)	—N/a	Traditional animation	LBS Communications; Nelvana; Wang Film Productions; American Greetings	Columbia Pictures	76	—N/a	$8,540,346	A sequel to The Care Bears Movie, the ninth animated film from Columbia Pictures and the third animated film from Nelvana.
GoBots: Battle of the Rock Lords	March 21, 1986	—N/a	Traditional animation	Hanna-Barbera Productions; Tonka	Clubhouse Pictures	74	—N/a	$1,338,264	The fourth animated film from Clubhouse Pictures and the fifth animated film from Hanna-Barbera.
The Cosmic Eye	June 6, 1986	—N/a	Traditional animation	Hubley Studios	Upfront Films	71	—N/a	—N/a	The first animated film from Upfront Films.
My Little Pony: The Movie	June 6, 1986 (limited release); June 20, 1986 (official release)	—N/a	Traditional animation	Sunbow Entertainment; Marvel Productions	De Laurentiis Entertainment Group	87	$5,500,000	$5,958,456	The first animated film from De Laurentiis Entertainment Group and the first animated film to feature My Little Pony characters.
The Great Mouse Detective	June 29, 1986 (Walt Disney Studios); July 2, 1986 (official release)	Clock Cleaners	Traditional animation	Walt Disney Pictures; Walt Disney Feature Animation; Silver Screen Partners II	Buena Vista Distribution	74	$14,000,000	$25,336,794	The 26th animated film from Walt Disney Feature Animation and the first Disney animated film to extensively use CGI. Was re-released in 1992 as The Adventures of the Great Mouse Detective.
Robotech: The Movie	July 25, 1986 (Fort Worth)	—N/a	Anime	Harmony Gold USA; Tatsunoko Production	The Cannon Group	82	$8,000,000	—N/a	The first animated film from The Cannon Group.
The Transformers: The Movie	August 8, 1986	—N/a	Traditional animation	Sunbow Entertainment; Marvel Productions	De Laurentiis Entertainment Group	85	$6,000,000	$5,849,647	The second animated film from De Laurentiis Entertainment Group.
An American Tail	November 16, 1986 (Village 6, Missoula); November 21, 1986 (official release)	—N/a	Traditional animation	Amblin Entertainment; Sullivan Bluth Studios	Universal Pictures	80	$9,000,000	$47,483,002	The second animated film from Don Bluth, the third animated film from Universal Pictures and the first animated film from Amblin Entertainment.
The Chipmunk Adventure	May 22, 1987	—N/a	Traditional animation	Bagdasarian Productions	The Samuel Goldwyn Company	78	—N/a	$6,804,312	The third animated film from The Samuel Goldwyn Company and the first animated film to feature Alvin and the Chipmunks.
The Puppetoon Movie	June 12, 1987	—N/a	Stop-motion	Arnold Leibovit Entertainment	Expanded Entertainment	77	—N/a	—N/a	The first animated film from Expanded Entertainment.
The Brave Little Toaster	July 10, 1987 (Wadsworth Theatre)	—N/a	Traditional animation	The Kushner-Locke Company; Wang Film Productions	Hyperion Pictures	90	$2,300,000	$2,300,000	The first animated film from Hyperion Pictures and the first animated film to mix hand-drawn characters into a CGI environment. Also inspired two direct-to-video sequels (The Brave Little Toaster Goes to Mars, The Brave Little Toaster to the Rescue).
The Care Bears Adventure in Wonderland	August 7, 1987	—N/a	Traditional animation	Nelvana; Wang Film Productions; American Greetings	Cineplex Odeon Films	75	$5,000,000	$2,608,000	A sequel to The Care Bears Movie and Care Bears Movie II: A New Generation, the first animated film from Cineplex Odeon Films and the fourth animated film from Nelvana. Entered into the 1987 Cannes Film Festival.
Pinocchio and the Emperor of the Night	December 25, 1987	—N/a	Traditional animation	Filmation	New World Pictures	83	$10,000,000	$3,261,638	The fifth animated film from New World Pictures and the sixth animated film from Filmation.
Light Years	January 29, 1988	—N/a	Traditional animation	Col.Ima.Son; Films A2	Miramax Films	82	—N/a	$370,698	The first animated film from Miramax Films.
When the Wind Blows	October 24, 1986 (United Kingdom); March 11, 1988 (official release)	—N/a	Traditional animation/Stop-motion	Meltdown Productions; British Screen; Film Four International; TVC London; Penguin Books	Kings Road Entertainment	84	—N/a	$5,274	The first animated film from Kings Road Entertainment.
Pound Puppies and the Legend of Big Paw	March 20, 1988 (Children's Film and Television Center of America); March 25, 1988 (official release)	—N/a	Traditional animation	Carolco Pictures; Atlantic; Kushner-Locke; The Maltese Companies; Wang Film Productions; Tonka	TriStar Pictures	78	—N/a	$586,938	The first animated film from TriStar Pictures, the first animated film from Carolco Pictures and the first animated film to be presented in Ultra Stereo.
Who Framed Roger Rabbit	June 21, 1988 (Radio City Music Hall); June 22, 1988 (official release)	—N/a	Traditional animation/Live action	Touchstone Pictures; Amblin Entertainment; Silver Screen Partners III	Buena Vista Pictures Distribution	103	$50,600,000	$238,092,038	The first Touchstone animated film with live-action, the second animated film from Amblin Entertainment and the second animated film from Richard Williams. Renewed people's interest in animated films, nominee of a Golden Globe Award for Best Motion Picture – Musical or Comedy and winner of a Special Achievement Academy Award.
BraveStarr: The Movie	August 19, 1988	—N/a	Traditional animation	Filmation	Taurus Entertainment	91	—N/a	—N/a	The first animated film from Taurus Entertainment and the seventh animated film from Filmation.
Daffy Duck's Quackbusters	September 24, 1988 (matinee, New York)	The Night of the Living Duck	Traditional animation	Warner Bros. Animation	Warner Bros. Pictures	79	—N/a	—N/a	A sequel to Daffy Duck's Fantastic Island, the 10th animated film from Warner Bros. Pictures and the final of five compilation films featuring the Looney Tunes characters.
The Land Before Time	November 18, 1988	Amazing Stories: Family Dog	Traditional animation	Amblin Entertainment; Sullivan Bluth Studios	Universal Pictures	69	—N/a	$48,092,846	The third animated film from Don Bluth, the fourth animated film from Universal Pictures and the third animated film from Amblin Entertainment. Also inspired 13 direct-to-video sequels.
Oliver & Company	November 13, 1988 (Ziegfeld Theatre); November 18, 1988 (official release)	—N/a	Traditional animation	Walt Disney Pictures; Walt Disney Feature Animation; Silver Screen Partners III	Buena Vista Pictures Distribution	73	$31,000,000	$53,279,055	The 27th animated film from Walt Disney Feature Animation and the first animated film to include real-world advertising.
Castle in the Sky	March 31, 1989	—N/a	Anime	Studio Ghibli	Streamline Pictures	124	$3,300,000	$15,500,000	The first animated film from Streamline Pictures and the first animated Studio Ghibli film to be theatrically released in the United States.
Twilight of the Cockroaches	May 12, 1989 (Chicago)	—N/a	Anime/Live action	Madhouse; Kitty Films	Streamline Pictures	105	—N/a	—N/a	The second animated film from Streamline Pictures.
Babar: The Movie	July 28, 1989	—N/a	Traditional animation	Nelvana; Ellipse Programme; The Clifford Ross Company	New Line Cinema	74	—N/a	$1,305,187	The second animated film from New Line Cinema and the fifth animated film from Nelvana.
All Dogs Go to Heaven	November 17, 1989	—N/a	Traditional animation	Goldcrest Films; Sullivan Bluth Studios	MGM/UA Entertainment	84	$13,800,000	$27,100,027	The fourth animated film from Don Bluth and the fourth animated film from MGM/UA Entertainment Company.
The Little Mermaid	November 13, 1989 (Metropolitan Museum of Art); November 17, 1989 (official release)	—N/a	Traditional animation	Walt Disney Pictures; Walt Disney Feature Animation; Silver Screen Partners IV	Buena Vista Pictures Distribution	83	$40,000,000	$84,355,863	The 28th animated film from Walt Disney Feature Animation, the fourth Disney Princess, and the last Disney animated film from Walt Disney Feature Animation to use cel animation. Experimented with CAPS, kicked off the Disney Renaissance, nominee of a Golden Globe Award for Best Motion Picture – Musical or Comedy. It inspired a 2000 direct-to-video sequel and a 2008 direct-to-video prequel. Adapted into a 2023 live-action remake of the same name.
Akira	June 8, 1990	—N/a	Anime	TMS Entertainment	Streamline Pictures	124	$5,500,000	$25,000,000	The third animated film from Streamline Pictures.
Jetsons: The Movie	July 6, 1990	—N/a	Traditional animation	Hanna-Barbera Productions	Universal Pictures	82	—N/a	$20,305,841	The fifth animated film from Universal Pictures and the sixth animated film from Hanna-Barbera.
DuckTales the Movie: Treasure of the Lost Lamp	August 3, 1990	Dude Duck	Traditional animation	Walt Disney Pictures; Disney MovieToons; Walt Disney Television Animation; Walt Disney Animation France; Silver Screen Partners IV	Buena Vista Pictures Distribution	74	$20,000,000	$18,115,724	The first animated film from Disney MovieToons, the first animated film from Walt Disney Television Animation, the first time Disney distributed an animated film not made by Walt Disney Feature Animation, and the last Disney theatrical animated film to use traditional cel animation.
Lensman	September 26, 1990	—N/a	Anime	Madhouse	Streamline Pictures	107	—N/a	—N/a	The fourth animated film from Streamline Pictures.
The Rescuers Down Under	November 11, 1990 (Walt Disney Studios); November 16, 1990 (official release)	The Prince and the Pauper	Traditional animation	Walt Disney Pictures; Walt Disney Feature Animation; Silver Screen Partners IV	Buena Vista Pictures Distribution	77	—N/a	$47,431,461	A sequel to The Rescuers, the 29th animated film from Walt Disney Feature Animation, the first Disney animated film to fully use CAPS, and the first film to be completely created digitally.
The Nutcracker Prince	November 21, 1990	—N/a	Traditional animation	Lacewood Productions; Boulevard Entertainment; Allied Filmmakers	Warner Bros. Pictures	73	—N/a	$1,781,694	The 11th animated film from Warner Bros. Pictures.
Kiki's Delivery Service	December 21, 1990	—N/a	Anime	Studio Ghibli	Streamline Pictures	103	$6,900,000	$41,473,715	The fifth animated film from Streamline Pictures and the second animated Studio Ghibli film to be theatrically released in the United States.
The Castle of Cagliostro	April 3, 1991	—N/a	Anime	TMS Entertainment	Streamline Pictures	100	$4,830,918	$295,200	The sixth animated film from Streamline Pictures.
Robot Carnival	May 15, 1991	—N/a	Anime	A.P.P.P.	Streamline Pictures	90	—N/a	—N/a	The seventh animated film from Streamline Pictures.
Rover Dangerfield	August 2, 1991	Robin Hood Daffy	Traditional animation	Hyperion Animation	Warner Bros. Pictures	73	—N/a	—N/a	The 12th animated film from Warner Bros. Pictures and the second animated film from Hyperion Animation.
Fist of the North Star	September 27, 1991 (Salt Lake City); November 15, 1991 (New York)	—N/a	Anime	Toei Animation	Streamline Pictures	110	$6,742,698	$17,338,368	The eighth animated film from Streamline Pictures.
An American Tail: Fievel Goes West	November 17, 1991 (Kennedy Center); November 22, 1991 (official release)	—N/a	Traditional animation	Amblin Entertainment; Amblimation	Universal Pictures	75	$16,500,000	$40,766,041	A sequel to An American Tail, the sixth animated film from Universal Pictures, the fourth animated film from Amblin Entertainment and the first animated film from Amblimation. Also inspired two direct-to-video sequels (An American Tail: The Treasure of Manhattan Island, and An American Tail: The Mystery of the Night Monster).
Beauty and the Beast	September 29, 1991 (New York Film Festival); November 15, 1991 (El Capitan Theatre); November 22, 1991 (official release)	Tangled Ever After (2012 3D re-issue)	Traditional animation	Walt Disney Pictures; Walt Disney Feature Animation; Silver Screen Partners IV	Buena Vista Pictures Distribution	85	$25,000,000	$248,802,521	The 30th animated film from Walt Disney Feature Animation and the fifth Disney Princess. Winner of a Golden Globe Award for Best Motion Picture – Musical or Comedy, nominee of an Academy Award for Best Picture, was re-released in IMAX in 2002 with extra song added ("Human Again") and in 3D in 2012. It inspired three direct-to-video sequels (Beauty and the Beast: The Enchanted Christmas, Belle's Magical World, and Belle's Tales of Friendship). Adapted into a 2017 live-action remake of the same name.
Rock-a-Doodle	March 20, 1992 (Circle Theatre); April 3, 1992 (official release)	—N/a	Traditional animation/Live action	Goldcrest Films; Sullivan Bluth Studios	The Samuel Goldwyn Company	74	$18,000,000	$11,657,385	The fifth animated film from Don Bluth, the first Don Bluth animated film with live action and the fourth animated film from The Samuel Goldwyn Company.
FernGully: The Last Rainforest	April 5, 1992 (Cineplex Odeon Century Plaza Cinemas); April 10, 1992 (official release)	—N/a	Traditional animation	Kroyer Films; Youngheart Productions; FAI Films	20th Century Fox	76	$24,000,000	$32,710,894	The fifth animated film from 20th Century Fox and the first animated film to be presented in Dolby SR. Also inspired a 1998 direct-to-video sequel.
Barefoot Gen	July 3, 1992	—N/a	Anime	Madhouse; Gen Production	Streamline Pictures	85	—N/a	—N/a	The ninth animated film from Streamline Pictures. Also inspired a sequel, Barefoot Gen 2.
Cool World	July 10, 1992	—N/a	Traditional animation/Live action	Bakshi Productions	Paramount Pictures	102	$30,000,000	$14,110,589	The ninth and last animated film from Ralph Bakshi, the eighth animated film from Paramount Pictures and the first Paramount animated film with live action.
Bebe's Kids	July 31, 1992	Itsy Bitsy Spider	Traditional animation	Hyperion Animation; Hudlin Bros.	Paramount Pictures	73	$10,000,000	$8,442,162	The ninth animated film from Paramount Pictures and the first African-American animated film.
Little Nemo: Adventures in Slumberland	August 21, 1992	—N/a	Traditional animation/Anime	TMS Entertainment	Hemdale Film Corporation	85	$35,000,000	$1,368,000	The first animated film from Hemdale Film Corporation. Was re-released by Kidtoon Films in 2005.
Freddie as F.R.O.7	August 14, 1992 (United Kingdom); August 28, 1992 (official release)	—N/a	Traditional animation	Hollywood Road Films; J&M Entertainment	Miramax Films	91	—N/a	$1,119,368	The second animated film from Miramax Films. Was re-released on home video under an alternate re-edited version titled Freddie the Frog, with 20 minutes edited out.
The Tune	April 25, 1992 (Sundance Film Festival); September 11, 1992 (official release)	—N/a	Traditional animation	October Films		69	$175,000	—N/a	The first animated film from Bill Plympton and the first animated film from October Films.
Golgo 13: The Professional	October 2, 1992 (Boston)	—N/a	Anime	TMS Entertainment; Filmlink International	Streamline Pictures	93	—N/a	—N/a	The 10th animated film from Streamline Pictures.
Aladdin	November 11, 1992 (El Capitan Theatre); November 25, 1992 (original release)	—N/a	Traditional animation	Walt Disney Pictures; Walt Disney Feature Animation	Buena Vista Pictures Distribution	90	$28,000,000	$346,476,295	The 31st animated film from Walt Disney Feature Animation, the sixth Disney Princess, the first animated film to be presented in Dolby Digital and the last Disney animated film to be based on a fairytale for 18 years. Nominee of a Golden Globe Award for Best Motion Picture – Musical or Comedy. It inspired two direct-to-video sequels (The Return of Jafar, and Aladdin and the King of Thieves). Adapted into a 2019 live-action remake of the same name.
To Want to Fly	February 3, 1993	—N/a	Traditional animation/Live action	Pentafilm – Bambù	Fine Line Features	94	—N/a	$78,144	The first animated film from Fine Line Features.
Legend of the Overfiend	March 26, 1993	—N/a	Anime	West Cape Corporation; Shochiku-Fuji	Anime 21	108	—N/a	—N/a	The first animated film from Anime 21.
Super Dimensional Fortress Macross II: Lovers Again	March 26, 1993	—N/a	Anime	U.S. Renditions	Tara Releasing	150	—N/a	—N/a	The first animated film from Tara Releasing.
Neo Tokyo	April 2, 1993 (as a double-feature)	—N/a	Anime	Project Team Argos; Madhouse	Streamline Pictures	50	—N/a	—N/a	The 11th animated film from Streamline Pictures.
Silent Möbius	April 2, 1993 (as a double-feature)	—N/a	Anime	Anime International Company	Streamline Pictures	50	—N/a	—N/a	The 12th animated film from Streamline Pictures.
Vampire Hunter D	April 5, 1993	—N/a	Anime	Epic Records Japan; Movic; Sony Music Entertainment Japan; Ashi Productions	Streamline Pictures	80	—N/a	—N/a	The 13th animated film from Streamline Pictures.
My Neighbor Totoro	May 7, 1993	—N/a	Anime	Studio Ghibli	50th Street Films	86	—N/a	$41,076,708	The first animated film from 50th Street Films and the third animated Studio Ghibli film to be theatrically released in the United States.
Happily Ever After	May 28, 1993	—N/a	Traditional animation	Filmation	1st National Film Corporation	75	—N/a	$3,299,382	The first animated film from 1st National Film Corporation and the eighth and last animated film from Filmation after their closure in 1989.
Once Upon a Forest	June 18, 1993	—N/a	Traditional animation	Hanna-Barbera Productions; ITV Cymru Wales	20th Century Fox	71	$13,000,000	$6,582,052	The sixth animated film from 20th Century Fox and the seventh animated film from Hanna-Barbera.
Tom and Jerry: The Movie	July 20, 1993 (Planet Hollywood); July 30, 1993 (official release)	—N/a	Traditional animation	LIVE Entertainment; Turner Entertainment; WMG Film; Film Roman	Miramax Films	83	$3,500,000	$3,560,469	The third animated film from Miramax Films, the first animated film from Turner Pictures and the first animated film to feature Tom and Jerry.
Wicked City	September 12, 1993	—N/a	Anime	Japan Home Video; Video Art; Madhouse	Streamline Pictures	82	—N/a	—N/a	The 14th animated film from Streamline Pictures.
The Nightmare Before Christmas	October 9, 1993 (New York Film Festival); October 14, 1993 (El Capitan Theatre); October 15, 1993 (limited release); October 29, 1993 (official release)	Knick Knack (2006 3D re-issue)	Stop-motion	Touchstone Pictures; Skellington Productions	Buena Vista Pictures Distribution	76	$26,000,000	$50,003,043	The first animated film from Tim Burton, the first animated film from Touchstone Pictures and the first animated film from Skellington Productions. Was re-released in 3D in 2006.
We're Back! A Dinosaur's Story	November 24, 1993	—N/a	Traditional animation	Amblin Entertainment; Amblimation	Universal Pictures	71	—N/a	$9,317,021	The seventh animated film from Universal Pictures, the fifth animated film from Amblin Entertainment, the second animated film from Amblimation, the first non-Disney animated film to use digital ink and paint and the first animated film to be presented in DTS.
Batman: Mask of the Phantasm	December 25, 1993	—N/a	Traditional animation	Warner Bros. Family Entertainment; Warner Bros. Animation	Warner Bros. Pictures	76	$6,000,000	$5,617,391	The 12th animated film from Warner Bros. Pictures and the first animated film to feature Batman.
Megazone 23: Part I	March 29, 1994 (as a double-feature)	—N/a	Anime	Artland; Artmic	Streamline Pictures	82	—N/a	—N/a	The 15th animated film from Streamline Pictures.
Megazone 23: Part II	March 29, 1994 (as a double-feature)	—N/a	Anime	Artland; Artmic; Anime International Company	Streamline Pictures	82	—N/a	—N/a	The 16th and last animated film from Streamline Pictures before their closure in 2002.
Thumbelina	March 30, 1994	Animaniacs: I'm Mad	Traditional animation	Sullivan Bluth Studios	Warner Bros. Pictures	86	$28,000,000	$11,373,501	The sixth animated film from Don Bluth and the 13th animated film from Warner Bros. Pictures. Rights later went to 20th Century Fox.
The Princess and the Goblin	May 21, 1994 (Crest Theatre); June 3, 1994 (official release)	—N/a	Traditional animation	Pannonia Film Studio; S4C; NHK	Hemdale Film Corporation	82	$10,000,000	$2,105,078	The second and last animated film from Hemdale Film Corporation before their closure in 1995.
The Lion King	June 12, 1994 (El Capitan Theatre); June 15, 1994 (Radio City Music Hall); June 24, 1994 (official release)	—N/a	Traditional animation	Walt Disney Pictures; Walt Disney Feature Animation	Buena Vista Pictures Distribution	88	$45,000,000	$858,555,561	The 32nd animated film from Walt Disney Feature Animation. Winner of a Golden Globe Award for Best Motion Picture – Musical or Comedy, was re-released in IMAX in 2002 and in 3D in 2011. It also inspired a 1998 direct-to-video sequel and a 2004 direct-to-video prequel.
A Troll in Central Park	October 7, 1994	—N/a	Traditional animation	Sullivan Bluth Studios	Warner Bros. Pictures	75	—N/a	$71,368	The seventh animated film from Don Bluth and the 14th animated film from Warner Bros. Pictures. Rights later went to 20th Century Fox.
The Secret Adventures of Tom Thumb	November 11, 1994	—N/a	Stop-motion	BBC Bristol bolexbrothers	Tara Releasing	60	—N/a	$70,441	The second animated film from Tara Releasing.
The Swan Princess	November 17, 1994 (Trolley Corners); November 18, 1994 (official release)	—N/a	Traditional animation	Nest Family Entertainment; Rich Animation Studios	New Line Cinema	89	$21,000,000	$9,771,658	The third animated film from New Line Cinema and the first animated film from Rich Animation Studios.
The Pagemaster	November 23, 1994	—N/a	Traditional animation/Live-action	Turner Pictures; Colbath	20th Century Fox	75	$34,000,000	$13,670,688	The seventh animated film from 20th Century Fox, the second Fox animated film with live-action and the second animated film from Turner Pictures.
Royal Space Force: The Wings of Honnêamise	March 3, 1995	—N/a	Anime	Gainax	Tara Releasing	119	$7,793,720	$53,750,300	The third animated film from Tara Releasing.
A Goofy Movie	April 5, 1995 (AMC Pleasure Island); April 7, 1995 (official release)	Runaway Brain (in the UK)	Traditional animation	Walt Disney Pictures; Disney MovieToons; Walt Disney Television Animation	Buena Vista Pictures Distribution	77	—N/a	$35,348,597	The second animated film from Disney MovieToons and the second animated film from Walt Disney Television Animation. Also inspired a 2000 direct-to-video sequel.
The Pebble and the Penguin	April 12, 1995	Driving Mr. Pink (in the USA and Canada); Carrotblanca (internationally)	Traditional animation	Sullivan Bluth Studios	MGM/UA Entertainment (USA and Canada); Warner Bros. Pictures (Internationally)	74	$28,000,000	$3,983,912	The eighth animated film from Don Bluth, the fifth animated film from MGM/UA Entertainment Company, the final animated film from Don Bluth to use cel animation and the first animated film to be presented in DTS Stereo.
Casper	May 21, 1995 (Universal CityWalk); May 26, 1995 (official release)	—N/a	Computer animation/Live-action	Amblin Entertainment; Harvey Entertainment	Universal Pictures	100	$55,000,000	$100,328,194	The first Universal animated film with live-action, the sixth animated film from Amblin Entertainment and the first animated feature film to have a fully CGI character in the lead role, predating Toy Story by just six months. Also inspired two direct-to-video prequels (Casper: A Spirited Beginning, and Casper Meets Wendy).
Pocahontas	June 10, 1995 (Central Park); June 23, 1995 (official release)	—N/a	Traditional animation	Walt Disney Pictures; Walt Disney Feature Animation	Buena Vista Pictures Distribution	81	$55,000,000	$141,579,773	The 33rd animated film from Walt Disney Feature Animation, the seventh Disney Princess and the first animated film to be based on a true story. Also inspired a 1998 direct-to-video sequel.
Arabian Knight	August 25, 1995	—N/a	Traditional animation	Richard Williams Productions; Allied Filmmakers	Miramax Films	72	$28,000,000	$669,276	The third animated film from Richard Williams and the fourth animated film from Miramax Films.
Gumby: The Movie	September 1, 1995 (Twin Cities); September 8, 1995 (Detroit); September 29, 1995 (everywhere else)	—N/a	Stop-motion	Clokey Films; Premavision Productions	Arrow Releasing	94	$2,800,000	$57,100	The first animated film from Arrow Releasing and the first animated film to feature Gumby.
Space Adventure Cobra: The Movie	October 20, 1995 (Boston)	—N/a	Anime	TMS Entertainment	Tara Releasing	100	—N/a	—N/a	The fourth animated film from Tara Releasing.
Toy Story	November 19, 1995 (El Capitan Theatre); November 20, 1995 (Regency Theatre); November 22, 1995 (official release)	—N/a	Computer animation	Walt Disney Pictures; Pixar Animation Studios	Buena Vista Pictures Distribution	81	$30,000,000	$373,554,033	The first animated film from Pixar Animation Studios and the first fully computer-animated feature film ever made. Winner of a Special Achievement Academy Award, nominee of a Golden Globe Award for Best Motion Picture – Musical or Comedy and was re-released in 3D in 2009, along with Toy Story 2.
Balto	December 17, 1995 (Crown Gotham Theatre); December 22, 1995 (official release)	—N/a	Traditional animation	Amblin Entertainment; Amblimation	Universal Pictures	77	$31,000,000	$11,348,324	The eighth animated film from Universal Pictures, the seventh animated film from Amblin Entertainment and the third and last animated film from Amblimation before their closure in 1997. Also inspired two direct-to-video sequels in 2002 and 2004.
Roujin Z	January 5, 1996	—N/a	Anime	Tokyo Theaters Co; The Television Inc; Movic Co; Sony Music; A.P.P.P.	Central Park Media	84	—N/a	—N/a	The first animated film from Central Park Media.
All Dogs Go to Heaven 2	March 29, 1996	—N/a	Traditional animation	MGM/UA Family Entertainment; Metro-Goldwyn-Mayer Animation	MGM/UA Entertainment	83	—N/a	$8,620,678	A sequel to All Dogs Go to Heaven, the sixth animated film from MGM/UA Entertainment Company and the first animated film from Metro-Goldwyn-Mayer Animation. Also inspired a 1998 direct-to-video sequel.
Ghost in the Shell	March 29, 1996	—N/a	Anime	Production I.G; Bandai Visual; Manga Entertainment	Palm Pictures	82	$10,000,000	$43,000,000	The first animated film from Palm Pictures. Was re-issued in 2008 as Ghost in the Shell 2.0, with updated visuals.
James and the Giant Peach	April 12, 1996	—N/a	Stop-motion/Live-action	Walt Disney Pictures; Allied Filmmakers; Skellington Productions	Buena Vista Pictures Distribution	79	$38,000,000	$28,946,127	The second animated film from Tim Burton and the second and last animated film from Skellington Productions before their closure in 1998.
The Hunchback of Notre Dame	June 19, 1996 (Mercedes-Benz Superdome); June 21, 1996 (official release)	—N/a	Traditional animation	Walt Disney Pictures; Walt Disney Feature Animation	Buena Vista Pictures Distribution	91	$100,000,000	$325,500,000	The 34th animated film from Walt Disney Feature Animation. Also inspired a 2002 direct-to-video sequel.
Tenchi the Movie: Tenchi Muyo in Love	August 16, 1996	—N/a	Anime	Anime International Company; Pioneer LDC	Pioneer Entertainment	95	—N/a	—N/a	The first animated film from Pioneer Entertainment. Also inspired a 1999 sequel, Tenchi Forever! The Movie.
Space Jam	November 10, 1996 (Grauman's Chinese Theatre); November 15, 1996 (official release)	—N/a	Traditional animation/Live-action	Warner Bros. Feature Animation; Warner Bros. Family Entertainment; Northern Lights Entertainment; Courtside Seats Productions	Warner Bros. Pictures	87	$80,000,000	$230,418,342	The second Warner Bros. animated film with live-action, the first animated film from Warner Bros. Feature Animation and the first animated film to be presented in Sony Dynamic Digital Sound.
Beavis and Butt-Head Do America	December 15, 1996 (Grauman's Chinese Theatre); December 20, 1996 (official release)	—N/a	Traditional animation	The Geffen Film Company; MTV Films	Paramount Pictures	81	$12,000,000	$63,118,386	The 10th animated film from Paramount Pictures, the first animated film from The Geffen Film Company and the first animated film from MTV Films.
Cats Don't Dance	March 26, 1997	Pullet Surprise	Traditional animation	Turner Feature Animation	Warner Bros. Pictures	74	$32,000,000	$3,588,602	The 15th animated film from Warner Bros. Pictures and the third animated film from Turner Feature Animation.
Hercules	June 15, 1997 (Times Square); June 27, 1997 (official release)	—N/a	Traditional animation	Walt Disney Pictures; Walt Disney Feature Animation	Buena Vista Pictures Distribution	93	$85,000,000	$250,700,000	The 35th animated film from Walt Disney Feature Animation and the first animated film to be based on Greek mythology. Also inspired a 1999 direct-to-video prequel.
The Swan Princess: Escape from Castle Mountain	July 18, 1997	—N/a	Traditional animation	Nest Family Entertainment; Rich Animation Studios	Legacy Releasing	71	—N/a	$273,444	A sequel to The Swan Princess, the second animated film from Rich Animation Studios and the first animated film from Legacy Releasing. Also inspired five direct-to-video sequels (The Swan Princess III: The Mystery of the Enchanted Treasure, The Swan Princess: Christmas, The Swan Princess: A Royal Family Tale, The Swan Princess: Princess Tomorrow, Pirate Today!, and The Swan Princess: Royally Undercover).
Pippi Longstocking	August 22, 1997	—N/a	Traditional animation	Nelvana; Svensk Filmindustri; IdunaFilm; TFC Trickompany	Legacy Releasing	77	$11,500,000	$505,335	The second animated film from Legacy Releasing and the sixth animated film from Nelvana.
The Real Shlemiel	September 19, 1997	—N/a	Traditional animation	Les Films de l'Arlequin; TMO-Loonland; Project Images Films; Videovox Stúdió; C2A; Club d'Investissement Média	Avalanche Releasing	78	—N/a	—N/a	The first animated film from Avalanche Releasing.
Anastasia	November 9, 1997 (Metropolitan Opera House); November 15, 1997 (Westwood Village Theatre); November 21, 1997 (official release)	—N/a	Traditional animation	Fox Family Films; Fox Animation Studios	20th Century Fox	94	$50,000,000	$139,801,096	The eighth animated film from 20th Century Fox, the first animated film from Fox Family Films, the first animated film from Don Bluth to use digital ink and paint and the first animated film from Fox Animation Studios. Also inspired a 1999 direct-to-video spinoff, Bartok the Magnificent.
Quest for Camelot	May 3, 1998 (Grauman's Chinese Theatre); May 15, 1998 (official release)	—N/a	Traditional animation	Warner Bros. Feature Animation; Warner Bros. Family Entertainment	Warner Bros. Pictures	85	$40,000,000	$38,172,500	The 16th animated film from Warner Bros. Pictures and the second animated film from Warner Bros. Feature Animation.
The Mighty Kong	May 29, 1998	—N/a	Traditional animation	L.A. Animation; Lana Productions; Hahn Shin Corporation	Legacy Releasing	72	—N/a	—N/a	The third animated film from Legacy Releasing and the first animated film to feature King Kong.
Mulan	June 5, 1998 (Hollywood Bowl); June 19, 1998 (official release)	—N/a	Traditional animation	Walt Disney Pictures; Walt Disney Feature Animation	Buena Vista Pictures Distribution	87	$90,000,000	$304,320,254	The 36th animated film from Walt Disney Feature Animation, the eighth Disney Princess and the first Disney animated film to be produced at Disney's Hollywood Studios. Also inspired a 2005 direct-to-video sequel. It was adapted into a 2020 live-action remake of the same name.
Small Soldiers	July 8, 1998 (Gibson Amphitheatre); July 10, 1998 (official release)	—N/a	Computer animation/Live-action	DreamWorks Pictures; Amblin Entertainment	Universal Pictures	109	$40,000,000	$87,500,000	The second Universal animated film with live-action, the first DreamWorks animated film with live-action and the eighth animated film from Amblin Entertainment.
I Married a Strange Person!	September 8, 1997 (Toronto International Film Festival); August 28, 1998 (official release)	—N/a	Traditional animation	Italtoons	Lionsgate Films	72	$250,000	$467,272	The second animated film from Bill Plympton and the first animated film from Lionsgate.
Antz	September 19, 1998 (TIFF); September 24, 1998 (Mann National Theatre); October 2, 1998 (official release)	—N/a	Computer animation	DreamWorks Animation; Pacific Data Images	DreamWorks Pictures	83	$42,000,000	$171,757,863	The first animated film from DreamWorks Pictures and the first animated film from DreamWorks Animation.
Rudolph the Red-Nosed Reindeer: The Movie	October 16, 1998	—N/a	Traditional animation	GoodTimes Entertainment; Golden Books; Tundra Productions	Legacy Releasing	92	$10,000,000	$113,484	The fourth and last animated film from Legacy Releasing before their closure in 1999.
The Rugrats Movie	November 8, 1998 (Grauman's Chinese Theatre); November 20, 1998 (official release)	CatDog: Fetch	Traditional animation	Nickelodeon Movies; Klasky Csupo	Paramount Pictures	80	$24,000,000	$140,894,685	The 11th animated film from Paramount Pictures, the first animated film from Nickelodeon Movies and the first animated film to feature the Rugrats.
A Bug's Life	November 14, 1998 (El Capitan Theatre); November 25, 1998 (official release)	Geri's Game	Computer animation	Walt Disney Pictures; Pixar Animation Studios	Buena Vista Pictures Distribution	95	$120,000,000	$363,258,859	The second animated film from Pixar Animation Studios.
The Prince of Egypt	December 16, 1998 (Royce Hall); December 18, 1998 (official release)	—N/a	Traditional animation	DreamWorks Animation	DreamWorks Pictures	99	$70,000,000	$218,613,188	The second animated film from DreamWorks Pictures and the second animated film from DreamWorks Animation. Also inspired a 2000 direct-to-video spin-off, Joseph: King of Dreams.
Babar: King of the Elephants	February 26, 1999	—N/a	Traditional animation	Nelvana; Home Made Movies; TMO-Loonland; The Clifford Ross Company	Alliance Films	79	—N/a	$227,374	A sequel to Babar: The Movie, the first animated film from Alliance Films and the seventh animated film from Nelvana.
The King and I	March 19, 1999	—N/a	Traditional animation	Morgan Creek Entertainment; Nest Family Entertainment; Rankin/Bass Productions; Rich Animation Studios	Warner Bros. Pictures	89	$25,000,000	$11,993,021	The 17th animated film from Warner Bros. Pictures, the first animated film from Morgan Creek Entertainment, the third animated film from Rich Animation Studios and the seventh and last animated film from Rankin/Bass before their closure in 2001.
Doug's 1st Movie	March 16, 1999 (Disney-MGM Studios); March 26, 1999 (official release)	Donald's Dynamite: Opera Box	Traditional animation	Walt Disney Pictures; Jumbo Pictures; Walt Disney Television Animation; Plus One Animation	Buena Vista Pictures Distribution	77	$5,000,000	$19,440,089	The first animated film from Jumbo Pictures and the third animated film from Walt Disney Television Animation.
Tarzan	June 12, 1999 (El Capitan Theatre); June 18, 1999 (official release)	—N/a	Traditional animation	Walt Disney Pictures; Walt Disney Feature Animation	Buena Vista Pictures Distribution	88	$130,000,000	$448,191,819	The 37th animated film from Walt Disney Feature Animation and the first major animated film to be screened in digital projection. Kicked off the Deep Canvas. It inspired a 2002 direct-to-video sequel and a 2005 direct-to-video prequel.
South Park: Bigger, Longer & Uncut	June 23, 1999 (Grauman's Chinese Theatre); June 30, 1999 (official release)	—N/a	Cutout animation	Warner Bros. Pictures; Comedy Central Films; Scott Rudin Productions	Paramount Pictures	81	$21,000,000	$83,137,603	The 12th animated film from Paramount Pictures, the 18th animated film from Warner Bros. Pictures and the first animated film from Comedy Central Films.
The Iron Giant	July 31, 1999 (Grauman's Chinese Theatre); August 6, 1999 (official release)	—N/a	Traditional animation	Warner Bros. Feature Animation	Warner Bros. Pictures	86	$50,000,000	$31,333,917	The 19th animated film from Warner Bros. Pictures and the third animated film from Warner Bros. Feature Animation.
Perfect Blue	August 20, 1999	—N/a	Anime	Madhouse	Rex Entertainment	81	$830,442	$768,050	The first animated film from Rex Entertainment.
Alien Adventure	August 20, 1999	—N/a	Computer animation	SimEx-Iwerks; Movida-Trix	nWave Pictures	35	—N/a	$24,074,680	The first animated film from nWave Pictures.
Princess Mononoke	September 26, 1999 (New York Film Festival); October 7, 1999 (Austin Film Festival); October 20, 1999 (Westwood Village Theatre); October 29, 1999 (official release)	—N/a	Anime	Studio Ghibli	Miramax Films	133	$23,500,000	$169,700,000	The fifth animated film from Miramax Films and the fourth animated Studio Ghibli film to be theatrically released in the United States.
Pokémon: The First Movie	November 6, 1999 (Grauman's Chinese Theatre); November 10, 1999 (official release)	Pikachu's Vacation	Anime	4Kids Entertainment; OLM	Warner Bros. Pictures	74	$5,000,000	$85,744,662	The 20th animated film from Warner Bros. Pictures and the first animated film to be based on Pokémon.
Toy Story 2	November 13, 1999 (El Capitan Theatre); November 24, 1999 (official release)	Luxo Jr.	Computer animation	Walt Disney Pictures; Pixar Animation Studios	Buena Vista Pictures Distribution	92	$90 million	$487,059,677	A sequel to Toy Story, the third animated film from Pixar Animation Studios and the first animated film to be presented in Dolby Digital Surround EX and DTS-ES. Winner of a Golden Globe Award for Best Motion Picture – Musical or Comedy and was re-released in 3D in 2009, along with Toy Story.
Stuart Little	December 5, 1999 (Westwood Village Theatre); December 17, 1999 (official release)	—N/a	Computer animation/Live-action	Columbia Pictures	Sony Pictures Releasing	85	$105-133 million	$300,135,367	The second Columbia animated film with live-action and the first animated film to be presented in 8-channel Sony Dynamic Digital Sound.
Fantasia 2000	December 17, 1999 (Carnegie Hall); January 1, 2000 (IMAX version); June 16, 2000 (general release)	—N/a	Traditional animation/Computer animation/Live-action	Walt Disney Pictures; Walt Disney Feature Animation	Buena Vista Pictures Distribution	74	$80–85 million	$90,874,570	A sequel to Fantasia, the 38th animated film from Walt Disney Feature Animation, the first animated film to be released in IMAX and the ninth and final Disney package film.

== See also ==
- List of animated feature films released theatrically in the United States (2000–2019)
- List of animated feature films released theatrically in the United States (2020-present)
- List of Disney theatrical animated feature films
  - List of 20th Century Studios theatrical animated feature films
- List of Universal Pictures theatrical animated feature films
- List of Paramount Pictures theatrical animated feature films
  - List of Warner Bros. theatrical animated feature films
- List of Sony theatrical animated feature films
- List of Metro-Goldwyn-Mayer theatrical animated feature films
- List of Lionsgate theatrical animated feature films
