= List of animated feature films released theatrically in the United States (2020–present) =

This list of theatrical animated feature films consists of animated films released theatrically, whether wide or limited, in the United States, since 2020.

Made-for-TV and direct-to-video films will not be featured on this list, unless they have had a theatrical release in some form.

Primarily live-action films with heavy use of special effects are also included.

== Films ==
=== Released ===
Title	Release date	Accompanying short	Medium	Studio	Distributor	Running time (minutes)	Budget	Box office	Note
Weathering with You	January 15, 2020	—N/a	Anime	CoMix Wave Films; Story Inc.	GKIDS	112	—N/a	$193,462,346	The 56th animated film from GKIDS.
The Wonderland	January 20, 2020	—N/a	Anime	Aniplex; Fuji Animation Studio; Dentsu; Signal.MD; Fuji Television Network, Inc.	Eleven Arts	115	—N/a	$592,866	The 26th animated film from Eleven Arts.
A Shaun the Sheep Movie: Farmageddon	September 22, 2019 (Odeon Leicester Square); February 7, 2020 (official release)	—N/a	Stop-motion	Aardman Animations; MEDIA sub-programme of Creative Europe; Anton Capital Entertainment	StudioCanal	87	—N/a	$43,100,248	A sequel to Shaun the Sheep Movie, the ninth animated film from StudioCanal and the eighth animated film from Aardman. Nominee of an Academy Award for Best Animated Feature.
Jiang Ziya	February 7, 2020	—N/a	Computer animation	Beijing Enlight Pictures; Zhongchuan Hedao; Coloroom Pictures; Cocoa Beans Animation	Well Go USA Entertainment	109	—N/a	$240,661,689	A sequel to Ne Zha and the second animated film from Well Go USA Entertainment.
Sonic the Hedgehog	January 25, 2020 (Paramount Theatre); February 14, 2020 (official release)	—N/a	Computer animation/Live-action	Sega Sammy Holdings; Original Film; Marza Animation Planet; Blur Studio	Paramount Pictures	99	$85–90 million	$319,715,683	The fifth Paramount animated film with live-action and the first animated film to feature Sonic the Hedgehog.
Ride Your Wave	February 19, 2020	—N/a	Anime	Science Saru	Fathom Events	95	—N/a	$4,006,347	The 18th animated film from Fathom Events.
Swift	February 21, 2020	—N/a	Computer animation	LUXX Film	Shout! Factory	90	—N/a	$4,428,275	The seventh animated film from Shout! Factory.
My Hero Academia: Heroes Rising	February 28, 2020	—N/a	Anime	Bones	Funimation Entertainment	104	—N/a	$29,876,826	A sequel to My Hero Academia: Two Heroes and the 17th animated film from Funimation Entertainment.
Onward	February 18, 2020 (El Capitan Theatre); March 6, 2020 (official release)	Playdate with Destiny	Computer animation	Walt Disney Pictures; Pixar Animation Studios	Walt Disney Studios Motion Pictures	102	$175–200 million	$141,940,042	The 22nd animated film from Pixar Animation Studios. Nominee of an Academy Award for Best Animated Feature and a Golden Globe Award for Best Animated Feature Film.
Children of the Sea	March 20, 2020	—N/a	Anime	Studio 4°C	Fathom Events	112	—N/a	$5,092,603	The 19th animated film from Fathom Events.
Strike	March 27, 2020	—N/a	Computer animation	Gigglefish	Indican Pictures	100	—N/a	$24,743	The fourth animated film from Indican Pictures.
Trolls World Tour	April 10, 2020	—N/a	Computer animation	DreamWorks Animation	Universal Pictures	91	$90–110 million	$49,276,818	A sequel to Trolls, the 24th animated film from Universal Pictures and the 38th animated film from DreamWorks Animation.
Scoob!	May 15, 2020	—N/a	Computer animation	Warner Animation Group	Warner Bros. Pictures	94	$90,000,000	$27,088,425	The 43rd animated film from Warner Bros. Pictures and the seventh animated film from Warner Animation Group.
StarDog and TurboCat	June 19, 2020	—N/a	Computer animation	Head Gear Films; Screen Yorkshire; Particular Crowd; Red Star 3D	Viva Pictures	91	—N/a	$586,399	The seventh animated film from Viva Pictures.
SamSam	July 24, 2020	—N/a	Computer animation	Folivari	Blue Fox Entertainment	77	—N/a	$3,180,721	The second animated film from Blue Fox Entertainment.
The SpongeBob Movie: Sponge on the Run	August 14, 2020	—N/a	Computer animation/Live-action	Paramount Animation; Nickelodeon Movies; United Plankton Pictures; MRC	Paramount Pictures	91	$60 million	$4,810,790	A sequel to The SpongeBob SquarePants Movie and The SpongeBob Movie: Sponge Out of Water, the 45th animated film from Paramount Pictures, the fifth animated film from Paramount Animation and the 16th animated film from Nickelodeon Movies.
100% Wolf	October 9, 2020	—N/a	Computer animation	Flying Bark Productions; Siamese Pty Ltd.	Viva Pictures	96	—N/a	$4,665,223	The eighth animated film from Viva Pictures.
Lupin III: The First	October 16, 2020	—N/a	Computer animation (Anime)	TMS Entertainment; Marza Animation Planet	GKIDS	92	—N/a	$7,355,088	The 57th animated film from GKIDS.
Wolfwalkers	November 13, 2020	—N/a	Traditional animation	Cartoon Saloon; Melusine Productions	GKIDS	103	—N/a	$229,041	The 58th animated film from GKIDS and the fourth animated film from Cartoon Saloon. Nominee of an Academy Award for Best Animated Feature and a Golden Globe Award for Best Animated Feature Film.
Fate/stay night: Heaven's Feel III. spring song	November 18, 2020	—N/a	Anime	Ufotable	Fathom Events	122	—N/a	$19,083,198	A sequel to Fate/stay night: Heaven's Feel I. presage flower and Fate/stay night: Heaven's Feel II. lost butterfly, and the 20th animated film from Fathom Events.
The Croods: A New Age	November 25, 2020	—N/a	Computer animation	DreamWorks Animation	Universal Pictures	95	$65 million	$215,905,815	A sequel to The Croods, the 25th animated film from Universal Pictures and the 39th animated film from DreamWorks Animation. Nominee of a Golden Globe Award for Best Animated Feature Film.
Soul	October 11, 2020 (BFI London Film Festival); December 25, 2020 (official release)	Burrow	Computer animation	Walt Disney Pictures; Pixar Animation Studios	Walt Disney Studios Motion Pictures	107	$150,000,000	$121,977,511	The 23rd animated film from Pixar Animation Studios. Winner of an Academy Award for Best Animated Feature and a Golden Globe Award for Best Animated Feature Film.
Earwig and the Witch	February 3, 2021	—N/a	Computer animation (Anime)	Studio Ghibli	GKIDS	82	$325,617	$182,760	The 59th animated film from GKIDS and the 18th animated Studio Ghibli film to be theatrically released in the United States.
Tom and Jerry	February 26, 2021	—N/a	Computer animation/Live-action	Warner Animation Group; The Story Company; Turner Entertainment Co.	Warner Bros. Pictures	100	$79,000,000	$133,336,687	The 10th Warner Bros. animated film with live action and the eighth animated film from Warner Animation Group.
Raya and the Last Dragon	March 5, 2021	Us Again	Computer animation	Walt Disney Pictures; Walt Disney Animation Studios	Walt Disney Studios Motion Pictures	112	$100,000,000+	$130,423,032	The 59th animated film from Walt Disney Animation Studios. Nominee of an Academy Award for Best Animated Feature and a Golden Globe Award for Best Animated Feature Film.
Mystery of the Kingdom of God	March 26, 2021	—N/a	Computer animation	Hidden Things Media	Atlas Distribution Company	91	—N/a	$17,316	The second animated film from Atlas Distribution Company.
Demon Slayer: Kimetsu no Yaiba – The Movie: Mugen Train	April 23, 2021	—N/a	Anime	Ufotable; Aniplex; Shueisha	Funimation Entertainment	117	—N/a	$383,759,873	The 18th animated film from Funimation Entertainment.
The Mitchells vs. the Machines	April 23, 2021	Monster Pets	Computer animation	Columbia Pictures; Sony Pictures Animation; Lord Miller Productions; One Cool Films	Sony Pictures Releasing	113	$50,000,000	$100,000,000	The 30th animated film from Columbia Pictures and the 19th animated film from Sony Pictures Animation. Nominee of an Academy Award for Best Animated Feature.
Spirit Untamed	June 4, 2021	—N/a	Computer animation	DreamWorks Animation; Jellyfish Pictures	Universal Pictures	88	$30,000,000	$42,717,215	A sequel to Spirit: Stallion of the Cimarron, the 26th animated film from Universal Pictures and the 40th animated film from DreamWorks Animation.
Wish Dragon	June 11, 2021	—N/a	Computer animation	Columbia Pictures; Sony Pictures Animation; Base FX; Flagship Entertainment Group; Tencent Pictures; Boss Collaboration; Cultural Investment Holdings; Beijing Sparkle Roll Media Corporation	Sony Pictures Releasing	98	$25 million	$25,860,000	The 31st animated film from Columbia Pictures and the 20th animated film from Sony Pictures Animation.
Peter Rabbit 2: The Runaway	June 11, 2021	—N/a	Computer animation/Live-action	Columbia Pictures; Animal Logic; MRC; 2.0 Entertainment; Olive Bridge Entertainment	Sony Pictures Releasing	93	$45,000,000	$153,901,717	A sequel to Peter Rabbit and the ninth Columbia animated film with live-action.
Luca	June 13, 2021 (Aquarium of Genoa); June 18, 2021 (official release)	For the Birds (2024 re-issue)	Computer animation	Walt Disney Pictures; Pixar Animation Studios	Walt Disney Studios Motion Pictures	101	$50,000,000	$51,074,773	The 24th animated film from Pixar Animation Studios. Nominee of an Academy Award for Best Animated Feature and a Golden Globe Award for Best Animated Feature Film.
The Boss Baby: Family Business	June 22, 2021 (SVA Theater); July 2, 2021 (official release)	—N/a	Computer animation	DreamWorks Animation	Universal Pictures	107	$82,000,000	$146,745,280	A sequel to The Boss Baby, the 27th animated film from Universal Pictures and the 41st animated film from DreamWorks Animation.
Space Jam: A New Legacy	July 12, 2021 (Regal LA Live & 4DX); July 16, 2021 (official release)	—N/a	Traditional animation/Computer animation/Live-action	Warner Animation Group; Warner Bros. Animation; The SpringHill Company; Proximity Media	Warner Bros. Pictures	115	$150,000,000	$162,892,228	A sequel to Space Jam, the 11th Warner Bros. animated film with live-action and the ninth animated film from Warner Animation Group.
Vivo	July 30, 2021	—N/a	Computer animation	Columbia Pictures; Sony Pictures Animation; One Cool Films; Laurence Mark Productions	Sony Pictures Releasing	99	—N/a	$1,326,371	The 32nd animated film from Columbia Pictures and the 21st animated film from Sony Pictures Animation.
PAW Patrol: The Movie	August 8, 2021 (Vue Leicester Square); August 20, 2021 (official release)	—N/a	Computer animation	Paramount Animation; Nickelodeon Movies; Elevation Pictures; Mikros Image; Spin Master Entertainment	Paramount Pictures	86	$26,000,000	$144,327,371	The 46th animated film from Paramount Pictures, the sixth animated film from Paramount Animation, the 17th animated film from Nickelodeon Movies and the first animated film from Spin Master Entertainment.
Cryptozoo	August 20, 2021	—N/a	Flash animation	Fit Via Fi; Electro Chinoland; Washington Square Films; Low Spark Films; Cinereach	Magnolia Pictures	95	—N/a	$37,883	The third animated film from Magnolia Pictures.
Huevos: An Egg Rescue	August 27, 2021	—N/a	Computer animation	Huevocartoon; Sky México; Cinergistic Films	Pantelion Films	89	—N/a	$3,320,518	A sequel to Huevos: Little Rooster's Egg-cellent Adventure and the second animated film from Pantelion Films.
The Addams Family 2	October 1, 2021	—N/a	Computer animation	Metro-Goldwyn-Mayer; Cinesite Studios; The Jackal Group; Bron Creative; Creative Wealth Media	United Artists	93	—N/a	$119,815,153	A sequel to The Addams Family, the ninth animated film from United Artists and the 10th animated film from Metro-Goldwyn-Mayer.
Koati	October 15, 2021	—N/a	Traditional animation	Upstairs Animation; Los Hijos de Jack; Latin We Productions; Timeless Films	Spanglish Movies; Maya Cinemas North America	92	—N/a	$1,735,864	The first animated film from Upstairs and Los Hijos de Jack.
Monster Family 2	October 15, 2021	—N/a	Computer animation	Ambient Entertainment	Viva Pictures	103	—N/a	$76,412	A sequel to Monster Family and the ninth animated film from Viva Pictures.
Ron's Gone Wrong	October 9, 2021 (65th BFI London Film Festival); October 15, 2021 (United Kingdom); October 22, 2021 (United States)	—N/a	Computer animation	20th Century Animation; Locksmith Animation	20th Century Studios	107	—N/a	$60,692,022	The first animated feature film to be distributed by 20th Century Studios, animated by DNEG Animation and produced by 20th Century Animation and Locksmith Animation.
The Laws of the Universe - The Age of Elohim	October 22, 2021	—N/a	Anime	HS Pictures Studio	Freestyle Releasing	159	$1,960,671	$1,960,671	A sequel to The Laws of the Universe: Part 0 and The Laws of the Universe: Part 1, and the third animated film from Freestyle Releasing.
My Hero Academia: World Heroes' Mission	October 29, 2021	—N/a	Anime	Bones	Funimation Entertainment	104	$29,387,202	$29,387,202	A sequel to My Hero Academia: Two Heroes and My Hero Academia: Heroes Rising, and the 19th animated film from Funimation Entertainment.
Daisy Quokka: World's Scariest Animal	October 29, 2021	—N/a	Computer animation	Like a Photon Creative	Vertical Entertainment	89	$173,264	$173,264	The fourth animated film from Vertical Entertainment.
The Spine of Night	October 29, 2021	—N/a	Traditional animation	Gorgonaut	RLJE Films	93	—N/a	—N/a	The second animated film from RLJE Films.
Clifford the Big Red Dog	November 10, 2021	—N/a	Computer animation/Live-action	Scholastic Entertainment; New Republic Pictures; Entertainment One; The Kerner Entertainment Company	Paramount Pictures	97	$64 million	$107,347,356	The sixth Paramount animated film with live-action, the fifth animated film from Entertainment One and the third animated film from the Kerner Entertainment Company.
Encanto	November 3, 2021 (El Capitan Theatre); November 24, 2021 (official release)	Far From the Tree	Computer animation	Walt Disney Pictures; Walt Disney Animation Studios	Walt Disney Studios Motion Pictures	102	$120–150 million	$261,286,178	The 60th animated film from Walt Disney Animation Studios. Winner of an Academy Award for Best Animated Feature and a Golden Globe Award for Best Animated Feature Film.
Sword Art Online Progressive: Aria of a Starless Night	December 3, 2021	—N/a	Anime	A-1 Pictures	Funimation Entertainment	97	—N/a	$14,037,060	A sequel to Sword Art Online The Movie: Ordinal Scale and the 20th animated film from Funimation Entertainment.
Flee	December 3, 2021	—N/a	Traditional animation	Vice Studios; Left Handed Films; RYOT Films; Final Cut for Real; Sun Creature Studio	Neon	90	—N/a	$727,973	The first animated film from Neon. Nominee of an Academy Award for Best Animated Feature and a Golden Globe Award for Best Animated Feature Film.
Macross Plus: Movie Edition	December 14, 2021	—N/a	Anime	Triangle Staff	Fathom Events	115	—N/a	—N/a	The 21st animated film from Fathom Events.
Rumble	December 15, 2021	—N/a	Computer animation	Paramount Animation; Reel FX Animation Studios; WWE Studios; Walden Media; New Republic Pictures	Paramount Pictures	95	—N/a	—N/a	The 47th animated film from Paramount Pictures, the seventh animated film from Paramount Animation and the second animated film from Walden Media.
Sing 2	November 14, 2021 (AFI Fest); December 12, 2021 (Greek Theatre); December 22, 2021 (official release)	—N/a	Computer animation	Illumination	Universal Pictures	110	$85 million	$408,402,685	A sequel to Sing, the 28th animated film from Universal Pictures and the 11th animated film from Illumination.
Hotel Transylvania: Transformania	January 14, 2022	—N/a	Computer animation	Columbia Pictures; Sony Pictures Animation; MRC	Sony Pictures Releasing	87	$75 million	$18,480,000	A sequel to Hotel Transylvania, Hotel Transylvania 2, and Hotel Transylvania 3: Summer Vacation, the 33rd animated film from Columbia Pictures and the 22nd animated film from Sony Pictures Animation.
Belle	January 14, 2022	—N/a	Anime/Computer animation	Studio Chizu	GKIDS	124	—N/a	$64,682,271	The 60th animated film from GKIDS.
Turning Red	February 21, 2022 (Everyman Borough Yards); March 11, 2022 (official release)	Kitbull	Computer animation	Walt Disney Pictures; Pixar Animation Studios	Walt Disney Studios Motion Pictures	100	$175 million	$21,813,358	The 25th animated film from Pixar Animation Studios. Nominee of an Academy Award for Best Animated Feature and a Golden Globe Award for Best Animated Feature Film.
Jujutsu Kaisen 0	March 18, 2022	—N/a	Anime	MAPPA	Crunchyroll	105	—N/a	$161,577,527	The first animated film from Crunchyroll.
Sonic the Hedgehog 2	April 5, 2022 (Regency Village Theatre); April 8, 2022 (official release)	—N/a	Computer animation/Live-action	Sega Sammy Holdings; Original Film; Marza Animation Planet; Blur Studio	Paramount Pictures	122	$90 million	$405,421,518	A sequel to Sonic the Hedgehog and the seventh Paramount animated film with live-action.
The Bad Guys	April 12, 2022 (Ace Hotel Los Angeles); April 22, 2022 (official release)	—N/a	Computer animation	DreamWorks Animation	Universal Pictures	100	$70 million	$250,387,888	The 29th animated film from Universal Pictures and the 42nd animated film from DreamWorks Animation.
Charlotte	April 22, 2022	—N/a	Flash animation	January Films; Les Productions Balathazar; Walking the Dog; Screen Flanders; Umedia; Telefilm Canada	Good Deed Entertainment	92	—N/a	$18,520	The first animated film from Good Deed Entertainment.
Pompo: The Cinéphile	April 27, 2022	—N/a	Anime	CLAP	GKIDS	90	—N/a	$172,657	The 61st animated film from GKIDS.
Ella and the Little Sorcerer	May 6, 2022	—N/a	Computer animation	Gold Valley Films	Vertical Entertainment	90	—N/a	$737,229	A sequel to Cinderella and the Secret Prince and the fifth animated film from Vertical Entertainment.
Around the World in 80 Days	May 13, 2022	—N/a	Computer animation	Cottonwood Media	Viva Pictures	82	$20 million	$4,023,974	The 10th animated film from Viva Pictures.
The Bob's Burgers Movie	May 17, 2022 (El Capitan Theatre); May 27, 2022 (official release)	—N/a	Traditional animation	20th Century Animation; Wilo Productions; Bento Box Entertainment	20th Century Studios	102	—N/a	$34,148,750	The 45th animated film from 20th Century Studios and the 19th animated film from 20th Century Animation.
Mad God	June 10, 2022	—N/a	Stop-motion/Live-action	Tippett Studio	IFC Films	83	—N/a	$153,069	The third animated film from IFC Films.
Lightyear	June 8, 2022 (El Capitan Theatre); June 14, 2022 (Annecy International Animation Film Festival); June 17, 2022 (official release)	—N/a	Computer animation	Walt Disney Pictures; Pixar Animation Studios	Walt Disney Studios Motion Pictures	105	$200 million	$226,425,420 f	A spin-off of Toy Story and the 26th animated film from Pixar Animation Studios.
Fruits Basket: Prelude	June 25, 2022	—N/a	Anime	TMS Entertainment	Crunchyroll	88	—N/a	$537,708	The second animated film from Crunchyroll.
Marcel the Shell with Shoes On	June 24, 2022 (limited release); July 15, 2022 (official release)	—N/a	Stop-motion/Live-action	Cinereach; You Want I Should LLC. Human Woman Inc. Sunbeam TV & Films; Chiodo Bros. Productions	A24	90	—N/a	$6,909,209	The first A24 animated film with live-action. Nominee of an Academy Award for Best Animated Feature and a Golden Globe Award for Best Animated Feature Film.
Minions: The Rise of Gru	June 13, 2022 (Annecy International Animation Film Festival); June 25, 2022 (Grauman's Chinese Theatre); July 1, 2022 (official release)	—N/a	Computer animation	Illumination	Universal Pictures	88	$85 million	$940,203,765	A sequel to Minions, the 30th animated film from Universal Pictures and the 12th animated film from Illumination.
The Deer King	July 13, 2022	—N/a	Anime	Production I.G	GKIDS	114		$726,066	The 62nd animated film from GKIDS.
Paws of Fury: The Legend of Hank	July 10, 2022 (Paramount Studios); July 15, 2022 (official release)	Big Nate: Bad Hamster	Computer animation	Nickelodeon Movies; Align; GFM Animation; Flying Tigers Entertainment; Aniventure; Brooksfilms; Cinesite; HB Wink Animation	Paramount Pictures	97	$45 million	$42,439,184	The 48th animated film from Paramount Pictures and the 18th animated film from Nickelodeon Movies.
DC League of Super-Pets	July 27, 2022 (Warner Bros. Studios); July 29, 2022 (official release)	—N/a	Computer animation	Warner Animation Group; Seven Bucks Productions; A Stern Talking To; DC Entertainment	Warner Bros. Pictures	106	$90 million	$207,557,117	The 44th animated film from Warner Bros. Pictures, the 10th animated film from Warner Animation Group and the final animated film under the Warner Animation Group name before renaming to Warner Bros. Pictures Animation in 2023.
Inu-Oh	August 12, 2022	—N/a	Anime	Science Saru	GKIDS	98	—N/a	$325,440	The 63rd animated film from GKIDS. Nominee of a Golden Globe Award for Best Animated Feature Film.
Dragon Ball Super: Super Hero	August 10, 2022 (Academy Museum of Motion Pictures); August 19, 2022 (official release)	—N/a	Anime	Toei Animation	Crunchyroll	99	$69.3 million	$68,759,433	A sequel to Dragon Ball Super: Broly and the third animated film from Crunchyroll.
Goodbye, Don Glees!	September 14, 2022	—N/a	Anime	Madhouse; Kadokawa Animation	GKIDS	98	—N/a	$90,052	The 64th animated film from GKIDS.
Lyle, Lyle, Crocodile	October 2, 2022 (AMC Lincoln Square Theatre); October 7, 2022 (official release)	—N/a	Computer animation/Live-action	Columbia Pictures; Hutch Parker Entertainment; Eagle Pictures	Sony Pictures Releasing	106	$50 million	$111,080,122	The 10th Columbia animated film with live action.
Tad the Lost Explorer and the Curse of the Mummy	November 4, 2022	—N/a	Computer animation	Telecinco Cinema; Lightbox Animation Studios; Ikiru Films; Anangu Grup; La Tadeopelícula AIE	Paramount Pictures	89	$11 million	$30,300,000	A sequel to Tad, The Lost Explorer and Tad the Lost Explorer and the Secret of King Midas, and the 49th animated film from Paramount Pictures.
One Piece Film: Red	November 4, 2022	—N/a	Anime	Toei Animation	Crunchyroll	115	—N/a	$14,470,000	A sequel to One Piece: Stampede and the fourth animated film from Crunchyroll.
Strange World	November 15, 2022 (El Capitan Theatre); November 18, 2022 (Foyle Film Festival); November 23, 2022 (official release)	—N/a	Computer animation	Walt Disney Pictures; Walt Disney Animation Studios	Walt Disney Studios Motion Pictures	102	$135–180 million	$73,621,640	The 61st animated film from Walt Disney Animation Studios.
The Quintessential Quintuplets Movie	December 2, 2022	—N/a	Anime	Bibury Animation Studios	Crunchyroll	136	—N/a	$16,700,833	The fifth animated film from Crunchyroll.
Evangelion: 3.0+1.0 Thrice Upon a Time	December 6, 2022	—N/a	Anime	Studio Khara	Fathom Events	155	—N/a	$93,711,511	The 22nd animated film from Fathom Events.
Little Nicholas: Happy as Can Be	December 16, 2022	—N/a	Traditional animation	Method Animation	Buffalo 8	82	—N/a	$1,972,574	The first animated film from Buffalo 8.
Puss in Boots: The Last Wish	November 26, 2022 (limited release); December 13, 2022 (Lincoln Center); December 21, 2022 (official release)	—N/a	Computer animation	DreamWorks Animation	Universal Pictures	102	$80–90 million	$481,757,663	A sequel to Puss in Boots, the 31st animated film from Universal Pictures and the 43rd animated film from DreamWorks Animation. Nominee of an Academy Award for Best Animated Feature and a Golden Globe Award for Best Animated Feature Film.
That Time I Got Reincarnated as a Slime the Movie: Scarlet Bond	January 20, 2023	—N/a	Anime	Eight Bit	Crunchyroll	108	—N/a	$14,653,308	The sixth animated film from Crunchyroll.
New Gods: Yang Jian	January 20, 2023	—N/a	Computer animation	Light Chaser Animation Studios; Bilibili	GKIDS	127	—N/a	$23,713	The 65th animated film from GKIDS.
The Amazing Maurice	February 3, 2023	—N/a	Computer animation	Ulysses Filmproduktion; Cantilever Media; Studio Rakete; Red Star 3D; Moonshot Films	Viva Pictures	85	—N/a	$14,412,989	The 11th animated film from Viva Pictures.
Mummies	February 24, 2023	—N/a	Computer animation	4 Cats Pictures; Anangu Grup	Warner Bros. Pictures	88	$11.6 million	$54,475,970	The 45th animated film from Warner Bros. Pictures.
Demon Slayer: Kimetsu no Yaiba – To the Swordsmith Village	March 3, 2023	—N/a	Anime	Ufotable	Crunchyroll	110	—N/a	$41,298,065	A sequel to Demon Slayer: Kimetsu no Yaiba – The Movie: Mugen Train and the seventh animated film from Crunchyroll.
The Super Mario Bros. Movie	April 1, 2023 (Regal Cinemas L.A.); April 5, 2023 (official release)	—N/a	Computer animation	Illumination; Nintendo	Universal Pictures	92	$100 million	$1,360,847,665	The 32nd animated film from Universal Pictures, the 13th animated film from Illumination and the first animated film to feature Mario. Nominee of a Golden Globe Award for Best Animated Feature Film.
Suzume	April 14, 2023	—N/a	Anime	CoMix Wave Films; Story Inc.	Crunchyroll	122	—N/a	$323,638,107	The eighth animated film from Crunchyroll. Nominee of a Golden Globe Award for Best Animated Feature Film.
Blind Willow, Sleeping Woman	April 14, 2023	—N/a	Traditional animation	Miyu Productions; Cinéma De facto	Zeitgeist Films	100	—N/a	$65,184	The third animated film from Zeitgeist Films.
Rally Road Racers	May 12, 2023	—N/a	Computer animation	Vanguard Animation; Riverstone Pictures; Kintop Pictures	Viva Pictures	93	—N/a	$1,518,055	The 12th animated film from Viva Pictures and the fourth animated film from Vanguard Animation.
Spider-Man: Across the Spider-Verse	May 30, 2023 (Regency Village Theatre); June 2, 2023 (official release)	—N/a	Computer animation	Columbia Pictures; Sony Pictures Animation; Marvel Entertainment; Pascal Pictures; Arad Productions; Lord Miller Productions	Sony Pictures Releasing	140	$100 million	$690,824,738	A sequel to Spider-Man: Into the Spider-Verse, the 34th animated film from Columbia Pictures and the 23rd animated film from Sony Pictures Animation. Nominee of an Academy Award for Best Animated Feature and a Golden Globe Award for Best Animated Feature Film.
Elemental	May 27, 2023 (2023 Cannes Film Festival); June 16, 2023 (official release)	Carl's Date	Computer animation	Walt Disney Pictures; Pixar Animation Studios	Walt Disney Studios Motion Pictures	101	$200 million	$496,444,308	The 27th animated film from Pixar Animation Studios. Nominee of an Academy Award for Best Animated Feature and a Golden Globe Award for Best Animated Feature Film.
Lonely Castle in the Mirror	June 21, 2023	—N/a	Anime	A-1 Pictures; Shochiku	GKIDS	116	—N/a	$6,520,016	The 66th animated film from GKIDS.
Ruby Gillman, Teenage Kraken	June 15, 2023 (Annecy International Animation Film Festival); June 30, 2023 (official release)	—N/a	Computer animation	DreamWorks Animation	Universal Pictures	91	$70 million	$45,657,745	The 33rd animated film from Universal Pictures and the 44th animated film from DreamWorks Animation.
Psycho-Pass Providence	July 14, 2023	—N/a	Anime	Production I.G	Crunchyroll	120	—N/a	$210,219	The ninth animated film from Crunchyroll.
The First Slam Dunk	July 28, 2023	—N/a	Anime	Toei Animation	GKIDS	124	—N/a	$259,022,596	The 67th animated film from GKIDS.
Teenage Mutant Ninja Turtles: Mutant Mayhem	August 2, 2023	—N/a	Computer animation	Nickelodeon Movies; Point Grey Pictures	Paramount Pictures	100	$70–80 million	$181,848,832	The 50th animated film from Paramount Pictures and the 19th animated film from Nickelodeon Movies.
Strays	August 18, 2023	—N/a	Computer animation/Live-action	Lord Miller Productions; Picturestart	Universal Pictures	93	$46 million	$36,071,267	The fifth Universal animated film with live action.
The Inventor	September 15, 2023	—N/a	Stop motion	Curiosity Studio; Foliascope; Leo & King	Blue Fox Entertainment	92	$10 million	$190,031	The second animated film from Blue Fox Entertainment.
PAW Patrol: The Mighty Movie	September 29, 2023	Dora and the Fantastical Creatures	Computer animation	Nickelodeon Movies; Mikros Image; Spin Master Entertainment	Paramount Pictures	87	$30 million	$204,986,920	A sequel to PAW Patrol: The Movie, the 51st animated film from Paramount Pictures and the 20th animated film from Nickelodeon Movies.
The Canterville Ghost	October 20, 2023	—N/a	Computer animation	Align; Melmoth Films; Space Age Films; Sprout Pictures; Toonz Media Group	Blue Fox Entertainment	89	—N/a	$517,328	The third animated film from Blue Fox Entertainment.
Inspector Sun and the Curse of the Black Widow	October 27, 2023	—N/a	Computer animation	The Thinklab; Gordon Box; 3Doubles Producciones; Particular Crowd	Viva Pictures	88	—N/a	—N/a	The 13th animated film from Viva Pictures.
Under the Boardwalk	October 27, 2023	—N/a	Computer animation	Paramount Animation; Big Kid Pictures; DNEG Animation	Paramount Pictures	86	—N/a	—N/a	The 52nd animated film from Paramount Pictures and the eighth animated film from Paramount Animation.
The Tunnel to Summer, the Exit of Goodbyes	November 3, 2023	—N/a	Anime	CLAP	Sentai Filmworks	83	—N/a	—N/a	The first animated film from Sentai Filmworks.
Trolls Band Together	November 17, 2023	—N/a	Computer animation	DreamWorks Animation	Universal Pictures	92	$95 million	$209,372,790	A sequel to Trolls World Tour, the 34th animated film from Universal Pictures and the 45th animated film from DreamWorks Animation.
Wish	November 8, 2023 (El Capitan Theatre); November 22, 2023 (official release)	—N/a	Computer animation	Walt Disney Pictures; Walt Disney Animation Studios	Walt Disney Studios Motion Pictures	95	$200 million	$254,997,360	The 62nd animated film from Walt Disney Animation Studios. Nominee of a Golden Globe Award for Best Animated Feature Film.
Deep Sea	November 24, 2023	—N/a	Anime	October Media	Viva Pictures	105	—N/a	—N/a	The 14th animated film from Viva Pictures.
The Boy and the Heron	December 8, 2023	—N/a	Anime	Studio Ghibli	GKIDS	124	—N/a	$294,200,000	The 68th animated film from GKIDS and the 19th animated Studio Ghibli film to be theatrically released in the United States. Winner of an Academy Award for Best Animated Feature and a Golden Globe Award for Best Animated Feature Film.
Migration	December 22, 2023	Mooned	Computer animation	Illumination	Universal Pictures	83	$72 million	$299,863,204	The 35th animated film from Universal Pictures and the 14th animated film from Illumination.
The Peasants	January 26, 2024	—N/a	Rotoscoping	BreakThru Films; DigitalKraft; Art Shot	Sony Pictures Classics	115	—N/a	$9,713,847	The eighth animated film from Sony Pictures Classics.
The Jungle Bunch: Operation Meltdown	February 2, 2024	—N/a	Computer animation	Tat Productions; France 3 Cinéma; Master Films; SND Groupe M6	Viva Pictures	88	—N/a	$11,070,362	A sequel to The Jungle Bunch and the 15th animated film from Viva Pictures.
Stopmotion	February 23, 2024	—N/a	Stop-motion/Live-action	BlueLight	IFC Films	93	—N/a	$778,410	The fourth animated film from IFC Films.
They Shot the Piano Player	February 23, 2024	—N/a	Traditional animation	Fernando Trueba PC; Gao Shan Pictures; Les Films D'ici; Prima Linea; Submarine; Animanostra	Sony Pictures Classics	103	—N/a	$336,593	The ninth animated film from Sony Pictures Classics.
Demon Slayer: Kimetsu no Yaiba – To the Hashira Training	February 23, 2024	—N/a	Anime	Ufotable; Aniplex; Shueisha	Crunchyroll	104	—N/a	$47,271,460	The 10th animated film from Crunchyroll.
Kung Fu Panda 4	March 3, 2024 (AMC The Grove 14); March 8, 2024 (official release)	—N/a	Computer animation	DreamWorks Animation	Universal Pictures	94	$85 million	$547,634,675	A sequel to Kung Fu Panda, Kung Fu Panda 2, and Kung Fu Panda 3, the 36th animated film from Universal Pictures and the 46th animated film from DreamWorks Animation.
Epic Tails	April 5, 2024	—N/a	Computer animation	TAT Productions; Apollo Films; France 3 Cinéma	Viva Pictures	95	$14,499,622	$14,499,622	The 16th animated film from Viva Pictures.
Chicken for Linda!	April 5, 2024	—N/a	Traditional animation	Dolce Vita Films; Miyu Productions; Palosamto Films; France 3 Cinéma	GKIDS	73	$663,593	$663,593	The 69th animated film from GKIDS.
Spy × Family Code: White	April 19, 2024	—N/a	Anime	Wit Studio; CloverWorks	Crunchyroll	110	$45,851,942	$45,851,942	The 11th animated film from Crunchyroll.
Mars Express	May 3, 2024	—N/a	Traditional animation	Everybody on Deck; Je Suis Bien Content; E.v.L. Prod; Plume Finance; France 3 Cinéma; Shine Conseils; Gebeka Films; Amopix	GKIDS	85	$1,177,485	$1,177,485	The 70th animated film from GKIDS.
Dragonkeeper	May 3, 2024	—N/a	Computer animation	Guardián de Dragones AIE; China Film Animation; Movistar Plus+ Atresmedia Cine	Viva Pictures	98	$6,134,292	$5,329,201	The 17th animated film from Viva Pictures.
Mobile Suit Gundam SEED Freedom	May 7, 2024	—N/a	Anime	Sunrise; Shochiku	Fathom Events	124	$30,149,103	$30,149,103	The 23rd animated film from Fathom Events.
IF	May 17, 2024	—N/a	Computer animation/Live-action	Sunday Night Productions; Maximum Effort	Paramount Pictures	104	$110 million	$190,309,707	The eighth Paramount animated film with live-action.
The Garfield Movie	May 24, 2024	—N/a	Computer animation	Columbia Pictures; Alcon Entertainment; Paws, Inc. DNEG Animation; One Cool Group; Wayfarer Studios; Stage 6 Films; Andrews McMeel Entertainment	Sony Pictures Releasing	101	$60 million	$261,192,027	The 35th animated film from Columbia Pictures and the first animated film from Alcon Entertainment.
Robot Dreams	May 31, 2024	—N/a	Traditional animation	Lokiz Films; Arcadia Motion Pictures	Neon	102	$3.7 million	—N/a	The second animated film from Neon.
Haikyu!! The Dumpster Battle	May 31, 2024	—N/a	Anime	Production I.G	Crunchyroll	85	$68.6 million	—N/a	The 12th animated film from Crunchyroll.
Inside Out 2	June 10, 2024 (El Capitan Theatre); June 14, 2024 (official release)	—N/a	Computer animation	Walt Disney Pictures; Pixar Animation Studios	Walt Disney Studios Motion Pictures	100	$200 million	$1,698,451,580	A sequel to Inside Out and the 28th animated film from Pixar Animation Studios. Nominee of an Academy Award for Best Animated Feature and a Golden Globe Award for Best Animated Feature Film.
Blue Lock the Movie -Episode Nagi-	June 28, 2024	—N/a	Anime	Eight Bit	Crunchyroll	91	—N/a	—N/a	The 13th animated film from Crunchyroll.
Despicable Me 4	June 9, 2024 (Jazz at Lincoln Center); July 3, 2024 (official release)	—N/a	Computer animation	Illumination	Universal Pictures	95	$100 million	$969,272,794	A sequel to Despicable Me, Despicable Me 2 and Despicable Me 3, the 37th animated film from Universal Pictures and the 15th animated film from Illumination.
A Greyhound of a Girl	July 27, 2024	—N/a	Traditional animation	Jam Media; Paul Thiltges Distributions; Aliante; Rija Films; Amrion Production; Fish Blowing Bubbles	Good Deed Entertainment	85	—N/a	$203,371	The second animated film from Good Deed Entertainment.
Harold and the Purple Crayon	August 2, 2024	—N/a	Traditional animation/Computer animation/Live-action	Columbia Pictures; Davis Entertainment	Sony Pictures Releasing	90	$40 million	$31,999,914	The 11th Columbia animated film with live-action.
Sirocco and the Kingdom of Winds	August 11, 2024	—N/a	Traditional animation	Sacrebleu Productions	GKIDS	74	—N/a	—N/a	The 71st animated film from GKIDS.
Ryan's World the Movie: Titan Universe Adventure	August 16, 2024	—N/a	Traditional animation/Live-action	PocketWatch; Sunlight Entertainment	Falling Forward Films	80	—N/a	$624,429	The first animated film from Falling Forward Films.
The Greatest Surf Movie in the Universe	August 16, 2024	—N/a	Stop-motion/Live-action	Bronte Pictures	Blue Fox Entertainment	81	—N/a	—N/a	The fourth animated film from Blue Fox Entertainment.
200% Wolf	August 23, 2024	—N/a	Computer animation	Flying Bark Productions	Viva Pictures	98	—N/a	$2,931,176	The 18th animated film from Viva Pictures.
The Concierge at Hokkyoku Department Store	September 11, 2024	—N/a	Traditional animation	Asatsu-DK; Aniplex; KDDI; Production I.G; Tohan Company	Crunchyroll	70	$383,776	$347,443	The 14th animated film from Crunchyroll.
Dan Da Dan: First Encounter	September 13, 2024	—N/a	Anime	Science Saru	GKIDS	83	—N/a	—N/a	The 72nd animated film from GKIDS.
Trapezium	September 18, 2024	—N/a	Anime	CloverWorks	Crunchyroll	94	—N/a	—N/a	The 15th animated film from Crunchyroll.
Transformers One	September 20, 2024	—N/a	Computer animation	Paramount Animation; Hasbro Entertainment; Bayhem Films; Di Bonaventura Pictures	Paramount Pictures	104	$75 million	$128,888,103	The 53rd animated film from Paramount Pictures and the ninth animated film from Paramount Animation.
The Wild Robot	September 27, 2024	—N/a	Computer animation	DreamWorks Animation	Universal Pictures	102	$6.5 million	$318,100,430	The 38th animated film from Universal Pictures and the 47th animated film from DreamWorks Animation. Nominee of an Academy Award for Best Animated Feature and a Golden Globe Award for Best Animated Feature Film.
Scarygirl	October 4, 2024	—N/a	Computer animation	Highly Spirited and Passion Pictures Australia	Viva Pictures	90	—N/a	—N/a	The 19th animated film from Viva Pictures.
Look Back	October 4, 2024	—N/a	Anime	Studio Durian	GKIDS	58	—N/a	—N/a	The 73rd animated film from GKIDS.
Piece by Piece	October 11, 2024	—N/a	Computer animation	The Lego Group; Tremolo Productions; I Am Other	Focus Features	93	$16 million	$10,291,872	The sixth animated film from Focus Features.
My Hero Academia: You're Next	October 11, 2024	—N/a	Anime	Bones	Toho International	110	$31,677,713	$5,041,781	A sequel to My Hero Academia: Two Heroes, My Hero Academia: Heroes Rising and My Hero Academia: World Heroes' Mission, and the first animated film from Toho International.
Kensuke's Kingdom	October 18, 2024	—N/a	Traditional animation	Lupus Films; Luxembourg Film Fund; Ffilm Cymru Wales; Bumpybox; BFI; Align; Mésuline Productions; Jigsaw Films; Le Pacte	Blue Fox Entertainment	85	$10,954,388	$3,215,372	The fifth animated film from Blue Fox Entertainment.
Gracie & Pedro: Pets to the Rescue	October 18, 2024	—N/a	Computer animation	Second Chance Productions and Polycat Animation	Luminescence	87	—N/a	$1,333,534	The first animated film from Luminescence.
Memoir of a Snail	October 25, 2024	—N/a	Stop-motion	Arenamedia and Snails Pace Films	IFC Films	94	$388,189	$562,037	The third animated film from IFC Films. Nominee of an Academy Award for Best Animated Feature and a Golden Globe Award for Best Animated Feature Film.
Hitpig!	November 1, 2024	—N/a	Computer animation	Aniventure; Cinesite; Rosebud Enterprises	Viva Pictures	86	$1,598,991	—N/a	The 20th animated film from Viva Pictures.
Overlord: The Sacred Kingdom	November 8, 2024	—N/a	Anime	Madhouse	Crunchyroll	135	$5,661,653	$6,216,653	The 16th animated film from Crunchyroll.
Ghost Cat Anzu	November 15, 2024	—N/a	Anime	Miyu Productions; Shin-Ei Animation	GKIDS	97	—N/a	$181,886	The 74th animated film from GKIDS.
Flow	November 22, 2024	—N/a	Computer animation	Dream Well Studio; Sacrebleu Productions; Take Five	Janus Films	85	—N/a	—N/a	The first animated film from Janus Films. Winner of an Academy Award for Best Animated Feature and a Golden Globe Award for Best Animated Feature Film.
Moana 2	November 21, 2024 (Lanikuhonua Cultural Institute); November 27, 2024 (official release)	—N/a	Computer animation	Walt Disney Pictures; Walt Disney Animation Studios	Walt Disney Studios Motion Pictures	100	$85,500,000	$109,600,000	A sequel to Moana and the 63rd animated film from Walt Disney Animation Studios. Nominee of a Golden Globe Award for Best Animated Feature Film.
From Ground Zero	December 3, 2024	—N/a	Cutout animation/Live-action	Coorigines Production; Metafora Production; Akka Films	Watermelon Pictures	112	—N/a	—N/a	The first animated film from Watermelon Pictures.
Solo Leveling: ReAwakening	December 6, 2024	—N/a	Anime	Aniplex	Crunchyroll	121	$1,090,000	$1,638,984	The 17th animated film from Crunchyroll.
The Lord of the Rings: The War of the Rohirrim	December 13, 2024	—N/a	Anime	New Line Cinema; Warner Bros. Animation; Sola Entertainment	Warner Bros. Pictures	134	$30,000,000	$1,800,000	The 46th animated film from Warner Bros. Pictures and the fourth animated film from New Line Cinema.
Sonic the Hedgehog 3	December 20, 2024	—N/a	Computer animation/Live-action	Sega Sammy Holdings; Original Film; Marza Animation Planet; Blur Studio	Paramount Pictures	110	$122 million	$1,377,470	A sequel to Sonic the Hedgehog and Sonic the Hedgehog 2 and the ninth Paramount animated film with live-action.
Mufasa: The Lion King	December 20, 2024	—N/a	Computer animation/Live-action	Walt Disney Pictures; Pastel Productions	Walt Disney Studios Motion Pictures	118	$200 million	$2,279	A prequel of The Lion King and the 16th Disney animated film with live-action.
Better Man	December 25, 2024	—N/a	Computer animation/Live-action	Footloose Productions; Sina Studios	Paramount Pictures	135	$110 million	$2 million	The 10th Paramount animated film with live-action.
Boonie Bears: Time Twist	January 24, 2025	—N/a	Computer animation	Fantawild Animation; Original Force; Sina Studios	Viva Pictures	105	—N/a	$312,650	The 21st animated film from Viva Pictures.
The Colors Within	January 24, 2025	—N/a	Anime	Science Saru	GKIDS	100	$1,764,321	—N/a	The 75th animated film from GKIDS.
Dog Man	January 31, 2025	Little Lies and Alibis	Computer animation	DreamWorks Animation	Universal Pictures	89	$40 million	$282,000	The 39th animated film from Universal Pictures and the 48th animated film from DreamWorks Animation.
A Sloth Story	February 28, 2025	—N/a	Computer animation	Eclectik Vision; Like A Photon Creative	Blue Fox Entertainment	90	—N/a	$397,728	The sixth animated film from Blue Fox Entertainment.
Mobile Suit Gundam GQuuuuuuX: Beginning	February 28, 2025	—N/a	Anime	Bandai Namco Filmworks; Studio Khara; Shochiku	GKIDS	81	$16,626,458	—N/a	The 76th animated film from GKIDS.
Night of the Zoopocalypse	March 7, 2025	—N/a	Computer animation	Copperheart Entertainment; Anton Capital Entertainment; Umedia; House of Cool; IDL Films	Viva Pictures	91	$3,836,642	$2,776,642	The 22rd animated film from Viva Pictures.
The Day the Earth Blew Up: A Looney Tunes Movie	March 14, 2025	—N/a	Traditional animation	Warner Bros. Animation	Ketchup Entertainment	91	$15 million	$1,916,576	The first animated film from Ketchup Entertainment.
A Minecraft Movie	April 4, 2025	—N/a	Computer animation/Live-action	Legendary Pictures; Vertigo Entertainment; On the Roam; Mojang Studios	Warner Bros. Pictures	100	$150 million	$110,700,000	The 12th Warner Bros. animated film with live-action and the third animated film from Legendary Pictures.
The King of Kings	April 11, 2025	—N/a	Computer animation	Mofac Animation	Angel Studios	101	$25,606,970	$25,921,301	The first animated film from Angel Studios.
Colorful Stage! The Movie: A Miku Who Can't Sing	April 17, 2025	—N/a	Anime	Colorful Palette; Crypton Future Media; P.A. Works	GKIDS	105	—N/a	$7,705,635	The 77th animated film from GKIDS.
Sneaks	April 18, 2025	—N/a	Computer animation	Lengi Studios; Cinema Gypsy Productions; House of Cool; GFM Animation	Briarcliff Entertainment	94	—N/a	$240,000	The first animated film from Briarcliff Entertainment.
Peppa Meets the Baby Cinema Experience	May 30, 2025	—N/a	Flash animation	Karrot Animation; Hasbro Entertainment	Trafalgar Releasing	65	$2 million	$3,489,342	The first animated film from Trafalgar Releasing.
Dan Da Dan: Evil Eye	June 6, 2025	—N/a	Anime	Science Saru	GKIDS	93	—N/a	$4,768,346	The 78th animated film from GKIDS.
Elio	June 10, 2025 (El Capitan Theatre); June 20, 2025 (official release)	—N/a	Computer animation	Walt Disney Pictures; Pixar Animation Studios	Walt Disney Studios Motion Pictures	98	$150,000,000	$3,000,000	The 29th animated film from Pixar Animation Studios. Nominee of a Golden Globe Award for Best Animated Feature Film.
KPop Demon Hunters	June 20, 2025 (Netflix); August 22, 2025 (sing-along event)	—N/a	Computer animation	Sony Pictures Animation	Netflix	95	$100 million	$18,000,000	The first theatrically released animated film from Netflix and the 24th animated film from Sony Pictures Animation. Winner of a Golden Globe Award for Best Animated Feature Film.
Smurfs	July 18, 2025	Order Up	Computer animation/Live-action	Paramount Animation; LAFIG Belgium; Peyo Company; Marcy Media Films	Paramount Pictures	89	$58 million	$2,459,148	The 54th animated film from Paramount Pictures, the 10th animated film from Paramount Animation and the 11th Paramount animated film with live-action.
The Bad Guys 2	August 1, 2025	—N/a	Computer animation	DreamWorks Animation	Universal Pictures	104	$80 million	$3 million	A sequel to The Bad Guys, the 40th animated film from Universal Pictures and the 49th animated film from DreamWorks Animation.
Hola Frida!	August 8, 2025	—N/a	Flash animation	Tobo Média; Du Coup Animation; Haut et Court	Level 33 Entertainment	82	$580,654	—N/a	The first animated film from Level 33 Entertainment.
Boys Go to Jupiter	August 8, 2025	—N/a	Computer animation	Glanderco	Cartuna	90	$53,091	—N/a	The second animated film from Cartuna.
Fixed	August 13, 2025	—N/a	Traditional animation	Sony Pictures Animation	Netflix	86	$20 million	—N/a	The second theatrically released animated film from Netflix and the 25th animated film from Sony Pictures Animation.
The Glassworker	August 15, 2025	—N/a	Traditional animation	Mano Animation Studios	Watermelon Pictures	99	$12,174	$26,013	The second animated film from Watermelon Pictures.
Ne Zha 2	August 22, 2025	—N/a	Computer animation	Beijing Enlight Pictures; Chengdu Coco Cartoon	A24	144	$20 million	$2,150,000,000	A sequel to Ne Zha and the first animated film from A24.
Light of the World	September 5, 2025	—N/a	Traditional animation	The Salvation Poem Project	Paper Air Media	91	$20 million	—N/a	The first animated film from Paper Air Media.
The Legend of Hei II	September 5, 2025	—N/a	Traditional animation	Beijing HMCH Anime Co., Ltd. Tianjin Maoyan Weiying Culture Media	GKIDS	120	$69.5 million	—N/a	A sequel to The Legend of Hei and the 79th animated film from GKIDS.
Demon Slayer: Kimetsu no Yaiba – The Movie: Infinity Castle	September 12, 2025	—N/a	Anime	Aniplex; Shueisha; Ufotable	Crunchyroll	155	$302.2 million	—N/a	The 18th animated film from Crunchyroll. Nominee of a Golden Globe Award for Best Animated Feature Film.
Elli and Her Monster Team	September 12, 2025	—N/a	Computer animation	CarpeDiem Film & TV; Dreamin' Dolphin Film; Grid Animation; Traumhaus Studios	Viva Pictures	86	—N/a	$1,834,537	The 23rd animated film from Viva Pictures.
Gabby's Dollhouse: The Movie	September 26, 2025	—N/a	Computer animation/Live-action	DreamWorks Animation	Universal Pictures	98	$32 million	$4,546,644	The sixth Universal animated film with live-action, the 41st animated film from Universal Pictures, the second DreamWorks animated film with live-action and the 50th animated film from DreamWorks Animation.
100 Meters	October 10, 2025	—N/a	Anime	Asmik Ace; Pony Canyon; TBS Television	GKIDS	106	—N/a	$1,807,224	The 80th animated film from GKIDS.
Pets on a Train	October 17, 2025	—N/a	Computer animation	Apollo Films; TAT Productions	Viva Pictures	87	—N/a	$5,294,179	The 24th animated film from Viva Pictures.
Exorcism Chronicles: The Beginning	October 17, 2025	—N/a	Anime	Locus Animation Studios	Viva Pictures	85	—N/a	$3,378,711	The 25th animated film from Viva Pictures.
Chainsaw Man – The Movie: Reze Arc	October 24, 2025	—N/a	Anime	MAPPA; Shueisha	Crunchyroll	100	—N/a	$68,300,000	The 19th animated film from Crunchyroll.
Stitch Head	October 29, 2025	—N/a	Computer animation	Gringo Films; Fabrique d'Images; GFM Animation; Traumhaus Studios; Wild Bunch	Briarcliff Entertainment	89	—N/a	$522,019	The second animated film from Briarcliff Entertainment.
Little Amélie or the Character of Rain	October 31, 2025	—N/a	Anime	Maybe Movies and Ikki Films	GKIDS	77	—N/a	$1,530,750	The 81st animated film from GKIDS. Nominee of a Golden Globe Award for Best Animated Feature Film.
Grand Prix of Europe	November 7, 2025	—N/a	Computer animation	Mack Animation; Timeless Films	Viva Pictures	98	—N/a	$12,413,065	The 26th animated film from Viva Pictures.
Arco	November 14, 2025	—N/a	Traditional animation	Remembers; MountainA; France 3 Cinéma; Fit Via Vi Film Productions; Sons of Rigor	Neon	82	$9.5 million	$2,821,277	The third animated film from Neon. Nominee of a Golden Globe Award for Best Animated Feature Film.
Zootopia 2	November 13, 2025 (El Capitan Theatre); November 26, 2025 (official release)	—N/a	Computer animation	Walt Disney Pictures; Walt Disney Animation Studios	Walt Disney Studios Motion Pictures	108	$150 million	$81.1 million	A sequel to Zootopia and the 64th animated film from Walt Disney Animation Studios. Nominee of a Golden Globe Award for Best Animated Feature Film.
Jujutsu Kaisen: Execution	December 5, 2025	—N/a	Anime	MAPPA; Shueisha; Sumzap	GKIDS	90	$23,100,000	—N/a	The 82nd animated film from GKIDS.
The SpongeBob Movie: Search for SquarePants	December 19, 2025	Teenage Mutant Ninja Turtles: Chrome Alone 2 – Lost in New Jersey	Computer animation/Live-action	Paramount Animation; Nickelodeon Movies; MRC	Paramount Pictures	88	$64 million	$145,342,224	A sequel to The SpongeBob SquarePants Movie, The SpongeBob Movie: Sponge Out of Water and The SpongeBob Movie: Sponge on the Run, the 55th animated film from Paramount Pictures, the 11th animated film from Paramount Animation, the 21st animated film from Nickelodeon Movies and the 12th Paramount animated film with live-action.
David	December 19, 2025	—N/a	Computer animation	Sunrise Animation Studios; 2521 Entertainment; Slingshot Productions	Angel Studios	115	$78,325,880	$80,288,343	The second animated film from Angel Studios.
Mission Santa: Yoyo to the Rescue	December 19, 2025	—N/a	Computer animation	Broadvision Perspectives; M.A.R.K.13; Studio56; Toon2Tango	Falling Forward Films	91	$1,116,291	—N/a	The second animated film from Falling Forward Films.
Lupin the IIIrd the Movie: The Immortal Bloodline	January 4, 2026	—N/a	Anime	TMS Entertainment; Telecom Animation Film	GKIDS	93	—N/a	$1,047,003	The 82nd animated film from GKIDS.
All You Need Is Kill	January 16, 2026	—N/a	Anime	Studio 4°C	GKIDS	82	—N/a	—N/a	The 83rd animated film from GKIDS.
Charlie the Wonderdog	January 16, 2026	—N/a	Computer animation	ICON Creative Studio; Centurion Pictures	Viva Pictures	95	—N/a	$620,775	The 27th animated film from Viva Pictures.
Zombie Land Saga: Yumeginga Paradise	January 19, 2026	—N/a	Anime	Avex; Cygames; MAPPA	Crunchyroll	120	—N/a	—N/a	The 20th animated film from Crunchyroll.
Tafiti: Across the Desert	January 30, 2026	—N/a	Computer animation	Little Dream Entertainment; Red Parrot Studios; Tradewind Pictures	Blue Fox Entertainment	81	$1,810,790	—N/a	The sixth animated film from Blue Fox Entertainment.
Buffalo Kids	February 6, 2026	—N/a	Computer animation	Little Big Boy; 4 Cats Pictures; Atresmedia Cine; Mogambo; CORE Animation; ESCine Español	Viva Pictures	82	$1,415,474	—N/a	The 28th animated film from Viva Pictures.
Scarlet	February 6, 2026	—N/a	Anime/Computer animation	Studio Chizu; Nippon Television; Columbia Pictures	Sony Pictures Classics	111	—N/a	$1,415,474	The 35th animated film from Columbia Pictures and the 10th animated film from Sony Pictures Classics.
Time Hoppers: The Silk Road	February 7, 2026	—N/a	Computer animation	Milo Productions	Fathom Entertainment	80	$69,233	—N/a	The first theatrical film from Fathom Entertainment and the first theatrical film made by Milo Productions.
Goat	February 13, 2026	—N/a	Computer animation	Columbia Pictures; Sony Pictures Animation; Unanimous Media; Modern Magic	Sony Pictures Releasing	100	$32,000,000	$47,600,000	The 36th animated film from Columbia Pictures and the 26th animated film from Sony Pictures Animation.
The Proud Princess	February 20, 2026	—N/a	Computer animation	Human; Luminar Film; PFX	Level 33 Entertainment	84	$4,200,000	$2,210,830	The second animated film from Level 33 Entertainment.
Uma Musume: Pretty Derby - Beginning of a New Era	February 27, 2026	—N/a	Anime	CygamesPictures	GAGA Corporation	108	$8,551,637	$9,451,726	The first animated film from GAGA Corporation.
Hypnosis Mic -Division Rap Battle- Interactive Movie	February 27, 2026	—N/a	Anime	Polygon Pictures	GKIDS	100	—N/a	$17,786,250	The 84th animated film from GKIDS.
Hoppers	February 23, 2026 (El Capitan Theatre); March 6, 2026 (official release)	—N/a	Computer animation	Walt Disney Pictures; Pixar Animation Studios	Walt Disney Studios Motion Pictures	104	—N/a	$252,178	The 30th animated film from Pixar Animation Studios.
The Pout-Pout Fish	March 20, 2026	—N/a	Computer animation	Cosmic Dino Studio; Like A Photon Creative; Macmillan Publishers; MiMO Studio; Screen Australia	Viva Pictures	92	—N/a	$2,335,928	The 29th animated film from Viva Pictures.
A Magnificent Life	March 27, 2026	—N/a	Traditional animation	What The Prod; Mediawan; Bidibul Productions; Walking The Dog	Sony Pictures Classics	91	—N/a	$1,311,791	The third animated film from Sylvain Chomet and the 11th animated film from Sony Pictures Classics.
The Super Mario Galaxy Movie	April 1, 2026	—N/a	Computer animation	Illumination; Nintendo	Universal Pictures	98	$110,000,000	$48,000,000	A sequel to The Super Mario Bros. Movie, the 42nd animated film from Universal Pictures and the 16th animated film from Illumination.
ChaO	April 10, 2026	—N/a	Anime	Studio 4°C	GKIDS	90	—N/a	—N/a	The 85th animated film from GKIDS.
Animal Farm	May 1, 2026	—N/a	Computer animation	The Imaginarium Studios; Aniventure; Cinesite; Goodfellas Animation; 6th And Idaho Productions	Angel Studios	96	$3,400,000	—N/a	The third animated film from Angel Studios.
That Time I Got Reincarnated as a Slime the Movie: Tears of the Azure Sea	May 1, 2026	—N/a	Anime	Eight Bit	Crunchyroll	105	$1,000,000	$5,198,992	The 21st animated film from Crunchyroll.
The Sheep Detectives	May 8, 2026	—N/a	Computer animation/Live-action	Metro-Goldwyn-Mayer; Working Title Films; Lord Miller Productions; Three Strange Angels Productions	Amazon MGM Studios	109	$75,000,000	$1,500,000	The first live-action/animated film from Amazon MGM Studios and the 11th animated film from Metro-Goldwyn-Mayer.
Labyrinth	May 10, 2026	—N/a	Anime	Sanzigen	GKIDS	116	$5,866	—N/a	The 86th animated film from GKIDS.
Mobile Suit Gundam: Hathaway – The Sorcery of Nymph Circe	May 15, 2026	—N/a	Anime	Sunrise	Bandai Namco Filmworks	108	$17,159,963	$18,125,953	The first animated film from Bandai Namco Filmworks.
Decorado	May 15, 2026	—N/a	Traditional animation	Abano Producións; Uniko; Glow; Sardinha em Lata; María y Arnold AIE	GKIDS	95	—N/a	$39,977	The 87th animated film from GKIDS.
Jinsei	June 5, 2026	—N/a	Anime	Rock'n Roll Mountain	Greenwich Entertainment	93	—N/a	$8,274	The first animated film from Greenwich Entertainment.
Another World	June 5, 2026	—N/a	Traditional animation	Point Five Productions; Silver Media Group; Film Development Council	GKIDS	111	$30-50 million	$1,947,264	The 88th animated film from GKIDS.
The Last Whale Singer	June 5, 2026	—N/a	Computer animation	Telescope Animation; PFX; La Boîte à Fanny	Viva Pictures	91	—N/a	$664,342	The 30th animated film from Viva Pictures.
Toy Story 5	June 9, 2026 (Los Angeles); June 19, 2026 (official release)	—N/a	Computer animation	Walt Disney Pictures; Pixar Animation Studios	Walt Disney Studios Motion Pictures	102	$71,000,000	$129,300,000	A sequel to Toy Story, Toy Story 2, Toy Story 3 and Toy Story 4 and the 31st animated film from Pixar Animation Studios.
Bouchra	June 26, 2026	—N/a	Computer animation	2 Lizards Production; Fondazione Prada; Hi! Production; SB Films	Film Movement	83	—N/a	—N/a	The first animated film from Film Movement.
Minions & Monsters	June 21, 2026 (Annecy); July 1, 2026 (official release)	—N/a	Computer animation	Illumination	Universal Pictures	90	$85,000,000	$9,967,000	A sequel to Minions and Minions: The Rise of Gru, the 43rd animated film from Universal Pictures and the 17th animated film from Illumination.
PAW Patrol: The Dino Movie	August 14, 2026	—N/a	Computer animation	Paramount Animation; Nickelodeon Movies; Spin Master Entertainment	Paramount Pictures	87	$39.5 million	$106,072,972	A sequel to PAW Patrol: The Movie and PAW Patrol: The Mighty Movie, the 56th animated film from Paramount Pictures, the 12th animated film from Paramount Animation and the 22nd animated film from Nickelodeon Movies.
All Wishes Come True!	August 14, 2026	—N/a	Computer animation	Pearl Studio	CMC Pictures	143	—N/a	$254,096,162	The first animated film from CMC Pictures.
Your Letter	August 17, 2026	—N/a	Anime	Studio Lico; Studio N	Crunchyroll	96	—N/a	$1,462,966	The 22nd animated film from Crunchyroll.
Coyote vs. Acme	August 28, 2026	—N/a	Computer animation/Live-action	Warner Bros. Pictures; Warner Animation Group; Troll Court Entertainment	Ketchup Entertainment	103	—N/a	$5,300,000	The second animated film from Ketchup Entertainment.
The Last Blossom	August 30, 2026	—N/a	Anime	CLAP	GKIDS	91	$80,436	—N/a	The 89th animated film from GKIDS.
Cocoon: One Summer of Girlhood	September 4, 2026	—N/a	Anime	Akita Shoten; NEP Japan; NHK; Sasayuri	GKIDS	63	—N/a	—N/a	The 90th animated film from GKIDS.
Tom and Jerry: Forbidden Compass	September 4, 2026	—N/a	Computer animation	China Film Group Corporation; Origin Animation	Viva Pictures	104	$5,467,685	$370,545	The 31st animated film from Viva Pictures.
Shaun the Sheep: The Beast of Mossy Bottom	September 18, 2026	—N/a	Stop motion	Aardman Animations; StudioCanal	GKIDS	80	$1,904,000	—N/a	The 91st animated film from GKIDS, A sequel to Shaun the Sheep Movie and A Shaun the Sheep Movie: Farmageddon, the 10th animated film from StudioCanal and the ninth animated film from Aardman.
Forgotten Island	September 25, 2026	—N/a	Computer animation	DreamWorks Animation	Universal Pictures	109	$13,718,920	$21,473,920	The 44th animated film from Universal Pictures and the 51st animated film from DreamWorks Animation.
Monster Mia	October 9, 2026	—N/a	Computer animation	ARX Anima; Arxlight Pictures; P!B!T! Films; M.A.R.K. 13; Ikiru Films	Sola Media	81	—N/a	—N/a	The first animated film distributed by Sola Media.
Wildwood	October 11, 2026 (BFI); October 23, 2026 (official release)	—N/a	Stop motion	Laika	Fathom Entertainment	131	$100,000,000	—N/a	The second theatrical film from Fathom Entertainment and the seventh animated film from Laika.
Tad and the Magic Lamp	October 30, 2026	—N/a	Computer animation	Anangu Grup; Ikiru Films; Lightbox Animation Studios; Telecinco Cinema	Paramount Pictures	94	—N/a	$17,842,810	A sequel to Tad, the Lost Explorer, Tad the Lost Explorer and the Secret of King Midas and Tad the Lost Explorer and the Curse of the Mummy and the 57th animated film from Paramount Pictures.
The Irregular at Magic High School THE MOVIE -Yotsuba Succession Arc-	November 1, 2026	—N/a	Anime	Eight Bit	Aniplex	103	—N/a	$2,094,769	The first animated film distributed by Aniplex.
The Cat in the Hat	October 11, 2026 (Warner Bros. Studios Burbank); November 6, 2026 (official release)	Daffy Season	Computer animation	Warner Bros. Pictures Animation; A Stern Talking To; Dr. Seuss Enterprises	Warner Bros. Pictures	107	$312,366,000	$92,000,000	The 47th animated film from Warner Bros. Pictures and the 11th animated film from Warner Bros. Pictures Animation.
Space Cadet	November 13, 2026	—N/a	Computer animation	Les Films Outsiders	Viva Pictures	86	—N/a	—N/a	The 32nd animated film from Viva Pictures.
Search Party: Where's PawPaw?	November 13, 2026	—N/a	Computer animation/Live-action	Faith+Works Productions; JBH Films	Atlas Distribution	102	—N/a	—N/a	The first animated film from Atlas Entertainment.
Festive Fun with Peppa Cinema Experience	November 14, 2026	—N/a	Flash animation	Karrot Animation; Hasbro Entertainment	Trafalgar Releasing	60	—N/a	—N/a	The second animated film from Trafalgar Releasing.
Ash and Crayons	November 20, 2026	—N/a	Computer animation/Live-action	Karandash Animation Studio; PFX; Unbroken Generation Production	Briarcliff Entertainment	99	—N/a	—N/a	The third animated film from Briarcliff Entertainment.

=== Upcoming ===
Film	Scheduled release date	Distributor	Animation studio	Notes
Hexed	November 25, 2026	Walt Disney Pictures	Walt Disney Animation Studios	
In Waves	November 27, 2026	Netflix	AC Independent and Charades Films	
A Fox Under a Pink Moon	December 2, 2026	Kino Lorber	Oskouei Film Production	
Ray Gunn	December 4, 2026	Netflix	Skydance Animation	
Gods Don't Give Gifts	December 4, 2026	Fable Studio	Gossip Goblin	
The Angry Birds Movie 3	December 23, 2026	Paramount Pictures	Rovio Animation, Sega Sammy Holdings, Prime Focus Studios, One Cool Films, Flywheel Media and Dentsu	
Light Pillar	January 1, 2027	Greenwich Entertainment	Fengduan Pictures and Cercamon	
Tangles	January 15, 2027	Independenta Film	Giant Ant, Lylas Pictures and Monarch Media	
Animal Friends	January 22, 2027	Warner Bros. Pictures	Legendary Pictures, Maximum Effort and Prime Focus	
Witch on the Holy Night	January 29, 2027	Crunchyroll	Ufotable and Aniplex	
Ice Age: Boiling Point	February 5, 2027	20th Century Studios	20th Century Animation	
CoComelon: The Movie	February 19, 2027	Universal Pictures	DreamWorks Animation, Moonbug Entertainment, Flywheel Media and Prime Focus Studios	
Gatto	March 5, 2027	Walt Disney Pictures	Pixar Animation Studios	
Sonic the Hedgehog 4	March 19, 2027	Paramount Pictures	Sega Sammy Holdings, Original Film, Marza Animation Planet and Blur Studio	Live-action/animation film
Not Alone	April 16, 2027	Universal Pictures	Illumination	
Bad Fairies	May 21, 2027	Warner Bros. Pictures	Warner Bros. Pictures Animation and Locksmith Animation	
Spider-Man: Beyond the Spider-Verse	June 18, 2027	Columbia Pictures	Sony Pictures Animation, Arad Productions, Lord Miller Productions and Pascal Pictures	
Shrek 5	June 30, 2027	Universal Pictures	DreamWorks Animation	
A Minecraft Movie Squared	July 23, 2027	Warner Bros. Pictures	Legendary Pictures, Vertigo Entertainment, On the Roam and Mojang Studios	Live-action/animation film
The Bluey Movie	August 6, 2027	Walt Disney Pictures	BBC Studios and Ludo Studio	
Untitled Teenage Mutant Ninja Turtles: Mutant Mayhem sequel	August 13, 2027	Paramount Pictures	Paramount Animation, Nickelodeon Movies and Point Grey Pictures	
The New Simpsons Movie	September 3, 2027	20th Century Studios	20th Century Animation and Gracie Films	
Untitled DreamWorks Animation Film	September 24, 2027	Universal Pictures	DreamWorks Animation	
The Haunting of Hotel Transylvania	October 8, 2027	Columbia Pictures	Sony Pictures Animation	
Charlie vs. the Chocolate Factory	November 5, 2027	Netflix	Netflix Animation Studios	
Margie Claus	November 12, 2027	Warner Bros. Pictures	Warner Bros. Pictures Animation and On the Day Productions	
Frozen 3	November 24, 2027	Walt Disney Pictures	Walt Disney Animation Studios	
Buds	December 22, 2027	Columbia Pictures	Sony Pictures Animation	
Ghost Market	March 10, 2028	Walt Disney Pictures	Pixar Animation Studios	
Oh, the Places You'll Go!	March 17, 2028	Warner Bros. Pictures	Warner Bros. Pictures Animation, Bad Robot Productions and Dr. Seuss Enterprises	
The Donkey Kong Movie	April 12, 2028	Universal Pictures	Illumination and Nintendo	
Incredibles 3	June 16, 2028	Walt Disney Pictures	Pixar Animation Studios	
Donkey	June 30, 2028	Universal Pictures	DreamWorks Animation	
Hello Kitty	July 21, 2028	New Line Cinema, Warner Bros. Pictures Animation, Sanrio and FlynnPictureCo.	Live-action/animation film	
Untitled DreamWorks film	September 22, 2028	Universal Pictures	DreamWorks Animation	
Dynamic Duo	September 22, 2028	Warner Bros. Pictures	Warner Bros. Pictures Animation, DC Studios, Swaybox and 6th & Idaho	
Freddy the 13th	October 13, 2028	Paramount Pictures	Paramount Animation	
The Lunar Chronicles	November 3, 2028	Warner Bros. Pictures	Warner Bros. Pictures Animation and Locksmith Animation	
Teenage Mutant Ninja Turtles	November 17, 2028	Paramount Pictures	Nickelodeon Movies and Original Film	Live-action/animation film
Clay	November 22, 2028	Walt Disney Pictures	Walt Disney Animation Studios	
Untitled Sonic film	December 22, 2028	Paramount Pictures	Sega Sammy Holdings, Original Film Marza Animation Planet and Blur Studio	Live-action/animation film
Untitled Walt Disney Animation Studios film	June 15, 2029	Walt Disney Pictures	Walt Disney Animation Studios	
Coco 2	November 21, 2029	Walt Disney Pictures	Pixar Animation Studios	

== See also ==
- List of animated feature films released theatrically in the United States (1937–1999)
- List of animated feature films released theatrically in the United States (2000–2019)
- List of Disney theatrical animated feature films
  - List of 20th Century Studios theatrical animated feature films
- List of Universal Pictures theatrical animated feature films
- List of Paramount Pictures theatrical animated feature films
  - List of Warner Bros. theatrical animated feature films
- List of Sony theatrical animated feature films
- List of Metro-Goldwyn-Mayer theatrical animated feature films
- List of Lionsgate theatrical animated feature films
