= The Tiger's Apprentice (soundtrack) =

2024 soundtrack albums

The Tiger's Apprentice is the 2024 animated fantasy film based on the 2003 novel of the same name by Laurence Yep, directed by Raman Hui for Paramount Animation. Two albums were released for the film: an extended play based on the songs heard in the film and another consisting of the film score composed by Steve Jablonsky.

== Singles ==
The 1982 single "Eye of the Tiger" originally performed by the American rock band Survivor was covered by musician-record producer Zhu for the film. This version was released as a single on January 26, 2024. The Japanese girl group Atarashii Gakko! performed the original song "Hello" which was released as a single on February 9. It debuted on the Billboard Pop 100 chart at number 37 with an increase of 58% in streaming. A music video of the song featuring the group was released on February 19.

== Soundtrack EP ==
The Tiger's Apprentice (Music from and Inspired by the Motion Picture)

EP by various artists
- Released: February 9, 2024
- Genre: Pop; rock; R&B
- Length: 20:08
- Label: 88rising

Singles from The Tiger's Apprentice (Music from and Inspired by the Motion Picture)
- 1. "Eye of the Tiger" Released: January 26, 2024; 2. "Hello" Released: February 9, 2024

The Tiger's Apprentice (Music from and Inspired by the Motion Picture) is an extended play featuring the songs heard in the film were released by 88rising on February 9, 2024. The EP featured six songs, including the two earlier released singles, and the performing artists included Audrey Nuna, Cacien, Derek Dali, Sayak Das and Thutmose as the featuring artist.

Track listing
No.	Title	Artist(s)	Length
1.	"Hello"	Atarashii Gakko!	2:33
2.	"Eye of the Tiger"	Zhu	4:19
3.	"Pleasures"	Audrey Nuna	4:12
4.	"Wake Up"	Cacien	2:21
5.	"Idol"	Derek Dali	4:04
6.	"Top of the World"	Sayak Das feat. Thutmose	2:39
Total length:			20:08

== Score ==
The Tiger's Apprentice (Music from the Paramount+ Original Movie)

Film score by Steve Jablonsky
- Released: February 16, 2024
- Recorded: 2021–2023
- Genre: Film score
- Length: 61:47
- Label: Paramount Music
- Producer: Steve Jablonsky

Steve Jablonsky chronology
DC League of Super-Pets (2022)	The Tiger's Apprentice (2024)	Borderlands (2024)

Steve Jablonsky was assigned as the film's composer in December 2023. He composed the film's score during the two-year long post-production process which he completed in mid-2023. The soundtrack featuring 20 tracks from Jablonsky's score were released as The Tiger's Apprentice (Music from the Paramount+ Original Movie) by Paramount Music on February 16, 2024.

Track listing
No.	Title	Length
1.	"Tom's Theme"	4:37
2.	"Mrs. Lee"	4:31
3.	"Protect the Guardian"	1:36
4.	"You Are Not Normal"	1:03
5.	"Meet Hu"	2:25
6.	"Yaoguai"	5:23
7.	"Nu Kua"	2:48
8.	"Meet Mistral"	1:02
9.	"Zodiac Temple"	3:11
10.	"Mansion on the Hill"	2:15
11.	"Where Is the Phoenix"	4:36
12.	"Training"	1:37
13.	"The Bridge"	2:28
14.	"1000 Generations"	2:37
15.	"Tom Vs Loo"	4:51
16.	"Zodiacs"	1:51
17.	"Tom's Sacrifice"	3:07
18.	"Sea of Tears"	4:11
19.	"Home"	2:00
20.	"Loo's Theme"	5:38
Total length:		61:47

== Reception ==
Frank Scheck of The Hollywood Reporter commented Steve Jablonsky's score as "outstanding". However, the soundtrack of the film was criticised with James Mottram of South China Morning Post described it as "entirely incongruous", and Steve Seigh of JoBlo.com called it as "underwhelming".

== Personnel ==
Credits adapted from Paramount Music.

- Music composed, produced, programmed and mixed by: Steve Jablonsky
- Additional music: Elisa Alloway, Freddy Avis, Sophia Blake
- Music co-ordinator: Sophia Blake
- Recording: Kevin Globerman, Lori Castro
- Mastering: Pat Sullivan
- Music editor: Ronald J. Webb
- Orchestrator: Gregory Prechel, Larry Rench, Tim Williams, Daniel A. Brown
- Pro-tools operator: Keith Ukrisna
- Conductor/Choir contractor: Jasper Randall
- Orchestra contractora: Peter Rotter, Laura Jackman
- Librarian: Nicholas J. Cazares
- Music preparation: Booker White, Aaron Meyer, Matt DiMona
- Violins: Bruce Dukov • Jessica Guideri • Alyssa Park • Teresa Stainslav • Maria Newmann • Charlie Bisharat • Stephanie Matthews • Joesfina Vergara • Tamara Hatwan • Maya Magub • Eun Mee-Ahn • Philip Levy • Shalini Vijayan • Helen Nightengale • Ben Jacobson • Roberto Cani • Luanne Homzy • Amy Hershberger • Wynton Grant • Grace Oh • Max Karmazyn • Ana Landauer • Roger Wilkie • Maia Jasper-White • Dennis Kim • Neil Samples • Irina Voloshina • Joel Pargman • Molly Rogers • Jackie Brand • Kevin Kumar
- Violas: Andrew Duckles • Robert Brophy • Shawn Mann • Matthew Funes • Luke Maurer • Scott Hosfeld • David Walther • Meredith Crawford • Zach Dellinger • Alma Fernandez • Steffan Smith • Victor Dealmeida
- Cellos: Jacob Braun • Dennis Karmazyn • Armen Ksajikian • Paula Hochhatter • Giovanna Clayton • Ross Gasworth • Ben Lash • Michael Kauffman • Evgeny Tonkha • Vanessa Freebairn-Smith
- Basses: Nico Abondolo • Michael Valerio • Steven Dress • Thomas Harte • Geoffrey Osika • David Parmeter
- French Horns: David Everson • Steve Becknell • Laura Brenes • Katie Farudo • Dylan Hart • Mike McCoy • Teag Reaves • Amy Jo Rhine • Kaylet Torrez • Jaclyn Rainey • Adedeji Ongufolu • Benjamin Jaber • Allen Fogle
- Trumpets: Jon Lewis • Robert Schear • Dan Rosenboom
- Trombones: Alex Iles • David Rejano Cantero • Craig Gosnell • Steve Holtman
- Tuba: Doug Tornquist
- Solo Cello: Jacob Braun
- Erhu: Karen Han
- Flute: Pedro Eustache
- Guitars: Thomas Strahle • Klayton
- Percussion: Steven Davis • Brian Kilgore
- Solo Vocalist: Uyanga Bold
- Choir (Sopranos): Kelci Hahn • Elissa Johnston • Alina Roitstein • Anna Schubert • Addy Sterrett • Courtney R. Taylor • Janet Szepei Todd • Suzanne Waters • Sunjoo Yeo • Andrea Zomorodian
- Choir (Altos): Lindsay Patterson Abdou • Aleta Braxton • Callista Hoffman-Campbell • Lesley Leighton • Sarah Lynch • Adriana Manfredi • Sara Mann • Jessica Rotter • Jessie Shulman • Nike St. Clair
- Choir (Tenors): Matthew Brown • Kenton Chen • Arnold Livingston Geis • Dermot Kiernan • Charlie Kim • Shawn Kirchner • Michael Litchenauer • JJ Lopez • Edmond Rodriguez • Gerald White
- Choir (Basses): Paul Chwe Minchul An • Michael Bannett • Reid Bruton • Dylan Gentile • William Kenneth Goldman • Abdiel Gonzalez • Scott T. Graff • James Hayden • Chung Uk Lee • Ben Han-Wei Lin
