= Dragon Cauldron =

1991 novel by Laurence Yep

- First edition
- Author: Laurence Yep
- Cover artist: David Wiesner
- Language: English
- Series: Dragon
- Genre: Fantasy novel
- Publisher: HarperCollins
- Publication date: 1991
- Publication place: United States
- Media type: Print (hardback & paperback)
- Pages: 312 pp
- ISBN: 0-06-026753-4
- OCLC: 22002116
- LC Class: PZ7.Y44 Do 1991
- Preceded by: Dragon Steel (1985)
- Followed by: Dragon War (1992)

Dragon Cauldron is a fantasy novel by American author Laurence Yep first published in 1991. It is the third book in his Dragon tetralogy. Dragon Cauldron marks a shift in narration from Shimmer, who had narrated the first two books in the series, to Monkey, who had up to that point played a minor role. Yep found it necessary to change narrative voices after six years of trying to write Dragon Cauldron. Monkey's status as an immortal made him "naturally cheerful even in the most dire of situations. Tough and yet funny, his consciousness provided the right platform from which I could observe a world in crisis". He had to modify the outline he had been working with as he decided that it would be necessary to kill off at least one character in order to provide "jeopardy" to Shimmer and her companions, which in turn would convey drama and emotional truth. This also allowed him to incorporate new material based on Chinese folklore that he had researched, forming the basis for the characters the Smith, the Snail Woman, and the Nameless One.

The story picks up where Dragon Steel left off. Exiled dragon princess Shimmer together with Thorn, Indigo, Civet, and Monkey attempt to get Baldy's cauldron repaired so that they can restore the Lost Sea, the waters of which Civet had used in Dragon of the Lost Sea to flood the city of River Glen.

== Plot summary ==
Shimmer, Monkey, Indigo, Thorn and Civet set off in search of the flying mountain home of the Smith and the Snail Woman, the only beings capable of repairing Baldy's cauldron. They camp for the night in a wasteland that was the site of a former a kingdom destroyed by the Nameless One, a once powerful king and wizard who could not be killed, and was punished by unknown terrible means.

The group discovers an ancient tomb in which they encounter a mysterious, ghostly woman. Civet, believing the spirit may help her to recover her magic, allows it to possess her; after the others rescue the former witch, she claims to have seen visions in which she perishes in flames and Thorn, who will be bowed down to by humans and dragons, releases a great evil.

While they are crossing the Desolate Mountains, a sudden avalanche sweeps the group into a river, and they wash up on a subterranean island. Although a furnished house stands on the island, it appears to be uninhabited except by a strange white dog, and the humans, Monkey, and Shimmer find that they cannot fly or swim away due to a magical barrier. While exploring the island, Monkey discovers a human skin. Thorn realizes that soil must be an exception to the barrier spell, or the island would have silted up. The group creates a raft from ceramic jars and escapes.

While the five are seeking a way out of the cavern, they see the same human skin floating in the river. It evades their attempts to capture it and speaks to them, and Civet realizes that her prophecy has come true: the skin is the Nameless One, who had been imprisoned on the island. The Nameless One gives himself the title of "the Boneless King" and vows to turn the whole world into a wasteland.

Leaving the mountain on foot and in disguise, the group encounters a battalion of soldiers who are excavating a strange ancient tomb on behalf of the human king, the Butcher. The Butcher himself soon arrives, accompanied by Shimmer’s brother Pomfret, who betrayed his clan to throw in his lot with the humans. The pair are followed shortly by the Boneless King in his current form. The Butcher’s forces destroy the Boneless King with a chemical called living fire; however, his soul escapes as his body is burned and he possesses the Butcher. The Boneless King then pretends to be the Butcher for the rest of the novel, concealing his magical abilities behind a puppet wizard named Horn.

In the resulting confusion, the group struggles to escape. Civet breaks away and creates a diversion by destroying the jars containing the living fire and dying amidst the flames, as she had envisioned. As the others flee, they are pursued by the Boneless King and Pomfret, but the Smith and the Snail Woman's mountain arrives, forcing the Boneless King to retreat.

The Smith agrees to try to fix the cauldron. However, when it is heated and struck on his anvil, the trapped soul within is freed. Thorn realizes what needs to be done, and climbing onto the hearth, jumps into the cauldron, fusing his soul into it and enabling the crack to be closed.

The Smith reveals that he and the Snail Woman plan to use Thorn in their fight against the Boneless King, but Shimmer, Indigo and Monkey disguise Thorn as a hammer and steal him out of the forge. They return to River Glen to boil away the Inland Sea but are ambushed by the King. As he flies off on Pomfret, the remaining three see Thorn give a flash of light, seeming to communicate to them that things will work out and giving them hope.

== Reception ==
Kirkus Reviews commented that:

Writing and images here are powerful enough for this to stand on its own; Yep's strong, earthy characters are notable as individuals even when a reader coming into the middle of the sequence doesn't know their history. Meanwhile, characters from Chinese folklore--the Monkey trickster, the dragon--continue to give this ripsnorting fantasy a special flavor. More to come.

However, School Library Journal criticized Yep's characterizations, stating that "the characters in this action-adventure are sketched in broad strokes, without the subtle shading found in his realistic stories, Dragonwings (1975) and Child of the Owl (1977, both HarperCollins)".

== Release details ==
- May 1991, HarperCollins, hardcover, ISBN 0-06-026753-4
- May 1991, HarperCollins, library binding, ISBN 0-06-026754-2
- February 1994, Tandem Library, library binding, ISBN 0-7857-2315-3
- February 1994, HarperTrophy, paperback, ISBN 0-06-440398-X
- 1991, Harpercollins, paperback
- January 1994, Demco Media, turtleback, ISBN 0-606-05814-1
