= Dragon War =

1992 novel by Laurence Yep

- First edition
- Author: Laurence Yep
- Cover artist: David Wiesner
- Language: English
- Series: Dragon
- Genre: Fantasy novel
- Publisher: HarperCollins
- Publication date: 1992
- Publication place: United States
- Media type: Print (hardback & paperback)
- Pages: 313 pp
- ISBN: 0-06-020302-1
- OCLC: 24320127
- LC Class: PZ7.Y44 Dqp 1992
- Preceded by: Dragon Cauldron (1991)

Dragon War is a fantasy novel American author Laurence Yep first published in 1992. It is the fourth and final book in his Dragon series. Yep attempted to put the beauty and gallantry of dragons he had gleaned from his research of them in Chinese mythology into Dragon War. By contrast, in the first three books of the series he "had tried to capture their quirkiness and strength".

The story picks up where Dragon Cauldron left off. Exiled dragon princess Shimmer along with Indigo and Monkey attempt to rescue Thorn, whose soul is trapped within Baldy's cauldron. The cauldron is now possessed by the powerful immortal wizard known as the Boneless King, who has possessed the body of the tyrannical human king known as the Butcher and launched an all out war against the dragons with the aid of Shimmer's brother Pomfret.

== Plot summary ==
The Boneless King captures Shimmer, Monkey, and Indigo. They manage to escape and attempt to retrieve Baldy's cauldron, in which Thorn's soul is now sealed. However the Boneless King turns the tables on them and traps them in a cavern beneath Egg Mountain where he was formerly imprisoned with the river poisoned and cavern sealed up. Indigo figures out that water is the exclusion to the barrier spell as the river can flow in, so transformed into ice versions of themselves, they are able to escape. Returning to the Boneless King's tomb disguised as soldiers, they find that he has finished his excavation and left. The three catch up to where the pack train is camped for the night, but are unable to bluff their way past the pickets and are forced to transform into horses. They discover that some of the guardsmen and horses have been poisoned from drinking the river water and that the pack train is transporting the stone soldiers that were found in the Boneless King's tomb. Still disguised, they accompany the pack train on its journey. On the way, mysterious gases emitted by the statues follow the pack train, arousing such resentment and fear from the population such that "the countryside was almost ready to rise in rebellion" by the time they reach the capital, Ramsgate. The pack train is nearly attacked by villagers at the capital's gates, but is saved by reinforcements. The statues are buried in a pit on the palace grounds.

The three manage to follow the Boneless King disguised as guardsmen to the harbor and onto the flagship of his war fleet, necessitating a change in disguise to being sailors. Determining that Thorn is in the captain's cabin, they manage to convince the Boneless King's puppet wizard Horn to let them in, but rouse his suspicions and that of his massive white dog Snowgoose, who he had rescued from his island. Unable to retrieve Thorn in time, they transform into fleas and hide on Snowgoose's collar. Able to smell them but unable to determine where they are, Snowgoose gets so upset that the Boneless King loses patience with her and has her locked in a storeroom. They leave and return to the deck just as the fleet sets sail. Pomfret arrives after the fleet is underway to relay intelligence of the dragon army gathered at the Hundred Children, an archipelago formed from an undersea mountain chain. He also recognizes that the strange, deep sea creatures that suddenly attack the fleet are illusions cast by dragon mages, resulting in the Boneless King dispelling them. The fleet is confronted with a wall of fire as it nears the Hundred Children. As the Boneless King attempts to disperse it, Shimmer makes her move to rescue Thorn, but she and Monkey are captured. At that moment the dragon army advances towards the fleet despite counterattacks on the vanguard with a flammable liquid that can burn in water. As the Boneless King prepares to use the cauldron to boil the ocean, Shimmer and Monkey escape and leap into the sea. Along with Indigo in dragon form, they are chased by Pomfret and marines transformed into alligators. They are nearly captured while attempting to lose their pursuers within the caves of the Hundred Children which Shimmer played in when she was younger, but by using the buoyancy properties of the needleweed juice that Indigo has been carrying all this time, Pomfret and the marines are rendered helpless as they are carried to the surface.

As they make their way towards the dragon army which has been forced to retreat and given 24 hours to surrender, Shimmer tries to convince Indigo to seek safety on the mainland. However Indigo adamantly refuses to go and vows to continue on with Shimmer, as Shimmer is "the only thing" she has ever loved given her rough existence, aided by Monkey's suggestion that she may have a role in carrying out Civet's prophecy. Catching up with the dragon army, on the way to Sambar's palace they are met by badly injured members of Shimmer's clan, who insist on escorting her. At the palace, Shimmer confronts her uncle, offering the dream pearl as temporary collateral for Baldy's cauldron and better treatment of the Inland Sea dragons, and asking for help in rescuing Thorn. News is then received that the krakens have begun a large scale invasion, capturing the other forts and forges and forcing the Inland Sea dragons to flee. Sambar has a change of heart and vows to fight alongside Shimmer, who will direct the effort against the Boneless King while he handles the krakens. Indigo devises a plan to use the exotic creatures found in Sambar's larder to terrify the humans, enabling to her to exact some payback on the kitchen staff who formerly mistreated her and earning the respect of the Inland Sea dragons who help her out.

After Shimmer's band of dragons is assembled, they receive intelligence on the Boneless King's dispositions from a mage named Bombax who spied on the humans in the form of a gull. It reveals that the Boneless King has erected a series of prefabricated forts on the Hundred Children, and that he is at one of the forts with Thorn and Pomfret. After Indigo observes that the defenses are oriented towards the east, Shimmer decides to use the dream pearl to cast an illusion augmented by the Grand Mage Storax's fog bank, while the other dragons hit the fleet from the west and Monkey rescues Thorn. When they are in position, Shimmer casts a great illusion of a dragon army approaching from the east, but the dream pearl physically drains her and nearly claims her life. Monkey is forced to destroy it to save her as Storax and his fellow mages create a fog illusion to mask that of the fake army. Monkey then infiltrates the fort where the Boneless King is and impersonates Pomfret, succeeding in getting the real Pomfret attacked by a second flame bird that the Boneless King had deployed. During its pursuit of Pomfret, this flame bird sails among the warships gathered in the channel, setting them ablaze and crippling the fleet. Monkey rescues Thorn just as the dragons begin their attack. They infiltrate the forts disguised as humans and disposing of the living fire bombs and sinking the remaining ships. He returns to the battle after leaving Thorn with Shimmer and Indigo, during which the unleashing of the exotic creatures of Sambar's larder on the forts proves the last straw for their garrisons, resulting in their surrenders. After it is over however, it turns out that Pomfret was able to steal Thorn back disguised as Monkey. Shimmer, still exhausted from using the dream pearl, along with Indigo and Monkey set off in pursuit.

They catch up to Pomfret, who is transporting the Boneless King, Horn, and Snowgoose. He flies into Ramsgate, which has erupted in revolt, and is chased all the way to the palace. There, faced with a revolt of his own ministers, the Boneless King openly declares himself for who he is, offering greater rewards to Pomfret who throws his lot in with him. The Boneless King then unleashes the stone statues from his tomb that were buried in the palace grounds, which suddenly brought to life, begin to attack his enemies. Monkey uses clones of himself to distract them and get them to attack each other, just as the Smith and Snail Woman arrive and lend their assistance. Leaving them to deal with the statues, Monkey, Indigo and Shimmer to chase after the Boness King. Inside the palace, they realize that Thorn bears a striking resemblance to the last king before the Butcher, Emerald III, making him the crown prince. They confront the Boneless King in the throne room where they fall into an ambush, with Shimmer and Monkey getting bound with magical iron collars while Indigo is turned into a bronze statue. The Boneless King decides to send them all back to "before there was time...back to when nothing had form or shape", from which not even he himself could escape. While he casts the spell, Pomfret tries to convince Shimmer that he was right, based on the vision of him as the king of all the dragons that he has seen in the World Mirror, which was found in the Nameless One's tomb and reflects the possibilities that could have been and could be, but does not make predictions. With Monkey's help, Shimmer gets Pomfret to see that if the Boneless King rules the world, all possibilities are revealed to be a wasteland with no signs of life. As Pomfret has a change of heart, the Boneless King finishes summoning the portal to before time then turns on him and binds him. As he begins to have Shimmer dragged into the portal, Pomfret, realizing the magnitude of what he has done, with a final effort throws himself at the Boneless King, carrying them both into the portal chased by Snowgoose.

The Boneless King's spells are dissipated, freeing Monkey and Shimmer and restoring Indigo. The news is broken to Lord Tower, the chancellor, that Thorn the crown prince is trapped in the cauldron. The Smith and the Snail Woman agree to help restore Thorn, taking a sample of one of the Boneless King's stone statues to study. As the war between the dragons and humans is over, Shimmer and her companions are later accompanied by the Inland Sea dragons and many humans from Ramsgate to River Glen, where the Inland Sea waters are boiled away with the cauldron. They then travel to the site of the Inland Sea, where its waters are poured out from the cauldron and restored. The Lord of the Flowers arrives and restores Ebony's tears, after which Indigo decides to join Shimmer's clan as she has lived among dragons for most of her life, being transformed into one by Storax. The Smith and the Snail Woman reappear with the news that they cannot fully restore Thorn to his human form, but can attempt to turn him into some form which will keep him as both part-cauldron and immortal, to which Thorn agrees, felt as a tingling when the cauldron is held. The Lord of the Flowers then reappears with Monkey's master, the wizard known as the Old Boy, who reveals that he left Thorn in the village of Amity as an infant. After he helps the Smith and the Snail Woman, Thorn is brought back in human form, but makes creaking sounds when he bends his joints. He is convinced to and agrees to assume the throne. Sambar later arrives following his victory over the krakens and bringing material aid and labor to help restore the Inland Sea. Disappointed that Thorn as the cauldron has been changed back, he accepts Thorn's pledge of friendship between the dragons and the humans. Monkey then departs the Inland Sea just before the arrival of the dragon King of the Golden Sea, from whom he had stolen his magical rod.

== Reception ==
The School Library Journal commented that "while the swirl of inventive details may obscure the emotional trajectory, the story provides a rare glimpse of Chinese mythic patterns...because it would be hard to follow events and character changes without reading the earlier books, this one is recommended where the others have been enjoyed". Publishers Weekly wrote that up to the final battle, "action to that point is overly drawn out, with a surfeit of near-climactic encounters and a few too many reversals of fortune. Further, readers new to the series may be confused by the characters' sketchy introductions and the complexity of past events alluded to but never clarified". In contrast, Kirkus Reviews commented that "Yep's vivid--and occasionally bizarre--characters and images are powerfully imaginative, a welcome respite from sword-and-sorcery stereotypes...Not for every reader, but destined to be a special favorite for a few".

== Release details ==
- May 1992, Harpercollins Children's Books, hardback, ISBN 0-06-020302-1
- October 1999, Tandem Library, library binding, ISBN 0-7857-3544-5
- May 1992, Harpercollins Children's Books, paperback
- January 1994, Harper Trophy, paperback, ISBN 0-06-440525-7
- June 1994, Demco Media, turtleback, ISBN 0-606-06336-6
