= Paramount Animation =

Animated media production division of Paramount Pictures

- Logo used since 2019 (Note: Current version with 'A Skydance Corporation' byline used since 2025.)
- Type: Division
- Industry: Animation; Motion pictures
- Predecessors: Fleischer Studios; Paramount Cartoon Studios; Terrytoons
- Founded: July 6, 2011; 15 years ago
- Founder: Brad Grey
- Headquarters: Los Angeles, California, United States
- Key people: Jennifer Dodge (president); Latifa Ouaou (EVP, Movies and Global Franchises) Traci Balthazor (EVP, Physical Production and Operations)
- Products: Animated films
- Number of employees: 112 (2020)
- Parent: Paramount Pictures
- Website: Official website

Paramount Animation is an American animation studio, serving as the animation division and label of Paramount Pictures. It was founded on July 6, 2011, following the critical and commercial success of Paramount's own Rango and the end of its distribution deal with DreamWorks Animation in 2012. Paramount Animation also collaborates with its sister studio, Nickelodeon Movies, on a number of projects, especially for those based on franchises from Nickelodeon. Its most successful franchise is the SpongeBob SquarePants film series following the original 2004 film (excluding the streaming spin-off films).

Paramount Animation has produced 12 feature films, with its first film being The SpongeBob Movie: Sponge Out of Water, released on February 6, 2015, and its latest being Paw Patrol: The Dino Movie, released on August 14, 2026. Their upcoming slate of films includes an untitled sequel to Teenage Mutant Ninja Turtles: Mutant Mayhem on August 13, 2027, Freddy the 13th on October 13, 2028, and an untitled fourth Paw Patrol film in 2029.

Films produced by Paramount Animation have grossed a total of $1.332 billion at the worldwide box office. Its highest-grossing film to date is Sponge Out of Water, which grossed $325.1 million. Sponge Out of Water, Under the Boardwalk, Transformers One, The SpongeBob Movie: Search for SquarePants, and Paw Patrol: The Dino Movie rank among the studio's most critically praised films to date.

== Background ==
After its theatrical releases of Gulliver's Travels in 1939 and Mr. Bug Goes to Town in 1941, and the closure of Paramount Cartoon Studios (formerly named Famous Studios) in December 1967, Paramount distributed a few animated films from 1973 to 1992 that were produced by outside studios, including Charlotte's Web, Aladdin and His Magic Lamp, Race for Your Life, Charlie Brown, Bon Voyage, Charlie Brown (and Don't Come Back!!), Heidi's Song, Bebe's Kids, and the live-action/animated hybrid Cool World—the latter of which was directed by former Paramount Cartoon Studios animator Ralph Bakshi.

In the fall of 1993, Canadian animation studio Nelvana signed a multi-year deal to produce five animated feature films in collaboration with Paramount Pictures, with Kathleen Kennedy and Frank Marshall producing; the first two began production the following summer, at a cost of over US$20 million each. Three of the projects were based on books by E. B. White (The Trumpet of the Swan), Clive Barker (The Thief of Always) and Graeme Base (The Sign of the Seahorse); an original production called Mask Vision was also in the works. However, none of the films were produced in this deal.

Following Paramount's merger with Viacom, the studio started releasing several animated films based on Nickelodeon's TV shows, including the Rugrats film trilogy, The Wild Thornberrys Movie, The SpongeBob SquarePants Movie, and Jimmy Neutron: Boy Genius; the films produced by Nickelodeon Movies. The studio also released features based on MTV's Beavis and Butt-Head and Comedy Central's South Park.

In 2005, Paramount's new CEO Brad Grey considered building an in-house animation division, because he saw family films as the "sweet spot" of the movie business. The following year, Paramount signed a distribution deal with DreamWorks Animation, starting with Over the Hedge and ending with Rise of the Guardians. During this deal, the studio released Nickelodeon Movies' Barnyard in 2006 and ImageMovers' Beowulf in 2007.

On March 4, 2011, the studio released its first in-house animated film, Nickelodeon Movies' Rango. The film was critically acclaimed and grossed over $245 million at the box office. The success of Rango helped Paramount discover its potential in making successful animated features on its own. In June of that year, the studio acquired the rights to produce an animated film based on Penny Arcade's 2010 webcomic The New Kid.

== History ==
=== Brad Grey era (2011–2017) ===
Early logo.

In July 2011, in the wake of Rango's success, the high hopes for The Adventures of Tintin, and the departure of DreamWorks Animation upon completion of their distribution contract with Madagascar 3: Europe's Most Wanted and Rise of the Guardians in 2012, Paramount announced the formation of a new animation division. The studio would initially produce one animated film a year with a maximum budget of $100 million. A key portion of the films would be co-produced with Nickelodeon and they would be cross-promoted at Nickelodeon's theme parks and hotels.

In October 2011, Paramount named a former president of Walt Disney Feature Animation, David Stainton, president of Paramount Animation. In February 2012, Stainton resigned for personal reasons, with Paramount Film Group's president, Adam Goodman, stepping in to directly oversee the studio. It was also announced that The SpongeBob Movie: Sponge Out of Water, a standalone sequel to 2004's The SpongeBob SquarePants Movie, would be the studio's first film and would be released in 2014. A short time after, the film was delayed to early 2015.

In August 2012, Variety reported that Paramount Animation was in the process of starting development of several animated films in collaboration with Nickelodeon, Mary Parent, and J. J. Abrams. Besides the SpongeBob sequel, Paramount Animation considered adapting Dora the Explorer, The Legend of Korra, and Monkey Quest into films. The increase in animated film production was due to DreamWorks Animation being in talks with other studios to distribute their post-2012 animated films.

On July 31, 2013, Paramount Animation announced that they were developing a new live-action/animated franchise in the vein of the Transformers series, which was titled Monster Trucks. Jonathan Aibel and Glenn Berger were set to write the film's script, Chris Wedge (director of 2002's Ice Age) was set to direct the film, and Mary Parent was set to produce the film, with an initial release date set for May 29, 2015.

The studio's first film, The SpongeBob Movie: Sponge Out of Water, was released on February 6, 2015, to positive reviews and was a box office success, grossing over $325 million worldwide and becoming the fifth highest grossing animated film of 2015. That same month, Paramount fired Adam Goodman due to the studio's thin film slate and Goodman greenlighting box office bombs at the studio. Paramount announced another SpongeBob film later that year.

In the summer of 2015, Paramount Animation participated in a bidding war against Warner Animation Group and Sony Pictures Animation for the rights to produce The Emoji Movie, based on a script by Tony Leondis and Eric Siegel. Sony won the bidding war in July and released the film in 2017. The studio's head Bob Bacon also left Paramount Animation that summer.

In June 2015, it was revealed that Spain's Ilion Animation Studios (the studio behind 2009's Planet 51) won a bidding war against other animation studios to produce a 3D animated tentpole film for Paramount Animation, which was already in production since 2014. In November 2015, Paramount Animation officially announced the project as Amusement Park, (later renamed Wonder Park) with former Pixar animator Dylan Brown helming. The studio also announced Monster Trucks, The Little Prince, Sherlock Gnomes, and the third SpongeBob film.

The Little Prince, originally released on July 29, 2015 in France, was scheduled to be released on March 18, 2016, in the United States as Paramount Animation's second release, but Paramount canceled the American release due to the French producers not paying an additional, previously agreed $20 million for the North American prints and advertising budget, however they still retained the distribution rights in France. It was later released on Netflix on August 5, 2016, as a Netflix original film.

On May 4, 2016, Paramount Pictures announced that it signed a deal with British animation studio Locksmith Animation to co-develop and co-produce three original animated projects to be theatrically released under the Paramount Animation label (with animation produced by DNEG), but in 2017, Paramount abandoned its deal with Locksmith when Paramount chairman and CEO Brad Grey was replaced by Jim Gianopulos.

The studio's second film Monster Trucks was released on January 13, 2017 to mixed reviews and became a box office failure, grossing $64.5 million on a $125 million budget.

In March 2017, Skydance Media formed a multi-year partnership with Ilion Animation Studios, forming Skydance Animation.

=== Jim Gianopulos/Mireille Soria era (2017–2021) ===
In April 2017, Paramount ended its deal with Locksmith Animation when Paramount chairman and CEO Brad Grey was replaced by Jim Gianopulos, who decided that their projects did not fit in with Paramount's other upcoming releases. Locksmith formed a multi-year production deal with 20th Century Fox four months later.

In July 2017, Paramount Pictures named former DreamWorks Animation co-president Mireille Soria as the president of the studio. Soria restructured the studio, increasing its number of employees from 10 to over 110, and created a new goal of releasing two tentpole animated films a year with different animation styles and genres. She would also look over the completion of Sherlock Gnomes and Wonder Park, which were in production before her arrival. That same month, Skydance announced its first two animated feature films for Skydance Animation — Split (later retitled Spellbound) and Luck. Both films would be distributed by Paramount Pictures as part of their deal with Skydance. On October 10, 2017, Bill Damaschke was hired to head the division as president of animation and family entertainment.

The studio released its third film, Sherlock Gnomes, on March 23, 2018, and became a critical and financial disappointment, grossing $90.3 million on a $59 million budget.

In April 2018, Paramount Pictures named former Blue Sky Studios and Nickelodeon Movies producer Ramsey Ann Naito as the executive vice president of the studio. She later left the company in order to become the head of animation at Nickelodeon. In the same month, Soria greenlit the studio's first three animated features under her leadership to be released in 2020 and beyond: The SpongeBob Movie: It's a Wonderful Sponge (later renamed Sponge On the Run), Reel FX's Monster on the Hill (later renamed Rumble), and Skydance Animation's Luck.

On January 14, 2019, Mireille Soria announced that the team at Paramount Animation will no longer work with Skydance Animation because of their hiring of former Walt Disney Animation Studios and Pixar CCO John Lasseter as the head of animation. Luck and Spellbound were still going to be released by Paramount Pictures without the Paramount Animation brand until Apple TV+ acquired the distribution rights to both films in December 2020 and made a larger pact with Skydance Animation in February 2021. Apple Original Films and Netflix would replace Paramount for Luck and Spellbound respectively.

The studio's fourth film, Wonder Park was released on March 15, 2019. It received mixed reviews and it became a box office flop, grossing only $119.6 million worldwide on a budget of less than $100 million.

In June 2019, Paramount Animation announced a new slate of animated features, including an animated Spice Girls film, a live-action/animated Mighty Mouse film, an animated film adaptation of The Tiger's Apprentice, a musical film titled Jersey Crabs (later Under the Boardwalk), and the Imagine Entertainment co-production The Shrinking of Treehorn.

The studio's fifth film The SpongeBob Movie: Sponge on the Run theatrically released only in Canada on August 14, 2020, with a March 4, 2021, release in the United States on Paramount+ and a November 5, 2020, release internationally on Netflix due to the COVID-19 pandemic. The film received positive reviews from critics, and grossed $4.4 million worldwide with a $60 million budget.

In January 2021, Paramount Animation picked up two new films: an adaption of the upcoming Tom Wheeler book C.O.S.M.O.S. and an original animated film from the Comedy Central star Trevor Noah.

=== Brian Robbins/Ramsey Ann Naito era (2021–2025) ===
On September 30, 2021, shortly after Brian Robbins replaced Jim Gianopulos as the chairman and CEO of Paramount Pictures, it was announced that Ramsey Ann Naito would replace Mireille Soria as the president of Paramount Animation in addition to her current role as the president of Nickelodeon Animation Studio.

The studio's sixth film Rumble was released on December 15, 2021, on Paramount+. It was originally expected to be released in theaters on February 18, 2022, but due to the COVID-19 pandemic, it was later moved to Paramount+. It received mixed reviews.

On January 20, 2022, Latifa Ouaou (a veteran of both Illumination and DreamWorks Animation via Universal Pictures) was hired as the executive vice president of movies and global franchises for both Paramount Animation and Nickelodeon Animation Studio. In this position, Ouaou will oversee both streaming and theatrical films for the two companies. It was also revealed that The Tiger’s Apprentice (which was originally being directed by Carlos Baena) will now be directed by Raman Hui, with Paul Watling and Yong Duk Jhun being co-directors. Bob Persichetti (the Academy Award-winning co-director of Sony Pictures Animation's Spider-Man: Into the Spider-Verse) had also joined the film as a producer.

On February 7, 2022, it was reported that Paramount Animation and it's sister studio, Nickelodeon Movies, signed a Multi-year deal with LAFIG Belgium and IMPS, the owners of The Smurfs brand, to produce multiple animated films based on Smurfs, with the first project being an animated musical film.

On July 26, 2023, Robbins revealed in a Variety article that the original film Under the Boardwalk would be released straight to Paramount+ instead of theaters (similar Rumble). He stated, “We’re not going to release an expensive original animated movie and just pray people will come,” while also pointing to the box office underperformances of Pixar animated films such as Lightyear and Elemental. This statement received widespread criticism on social media, including from those in the industry such as Guillermo del Toro, Jorge R. Gutierrez, and Christopher Miller. This also contradicts an earlier statement by the division’s president Naito, who stated in a Deadline interview that she plans to release original animated features to continue building franchises. Under the Boardwalk, the studio's seventh film was instead given a limited theatrical release under the Nickelodeon Movies imprint. It was released on October 27, 2023, with a video-on-demand release on November 7. It received positive reviews.

The studio's eighth film, The Tiger's Apprentice, was released on February 2, 2024 on Paramount+, after facing several theatrical delays and its theatrical release being cancelled. It received mixed reviews from critics.

On March 5, 2024, Paramount Animation signed a multi-year first-look deal with the Teenage Mutant Ninja Turtles: Mutant Mayhem director Jeff Rowe. Under this deal, Rowe will produce and direct both animated and live-action films, including the 2027 Mutant Mayhem sequel.

The studio's ninth film, Transformers One, was released on September 20, 2024. It received positive reviews from critics but became a financial disappointment, grossing $128.9 million worldwide on a budget of $75–147 million.

Its tenth film, Smurfs, was released on July 18, 2025. It received generally negative reviews from critics and becoming another disappointment, grossed only $124 million worldwide on a $58 million budget.

=== David Ellison/Jennifer Dodge era (2025–present) ===
After the merger of Paramount and Skydance was completed on August 7, 2025, David Ellison replaced Brian Robbins as the new CEO and chairman of Paramount Pictures. For the short term, Ramsey Ann Naito would remain as the president of Paramount Animation while stepping down from her role as president of Nickelodeon Animation Studio. Skydance Animation would continue to be operated separately under John Lasseter and focus on its multi-year output deal with Netflix.

On October 29, 2025, following mass layoffs at parent company Paramount Skydance, Naito announced she would be stepping down as president of Paramount Animation, with her saying in a note to staff, "I want to share with you that I am leaving the company and closing this very special chapter with all of you."

On November 11, 2025, former president of Spin Master Entertainment and Consumer Products Jennifer Dodge was named the new President of Paramount Animation, stepping into the role vacated by Naito at the end of October during the sweeping Paramount Skydance layoffs of some 1,000 employees.

Its eleventh film, The SpongeBob Movie: Search for SquarePants, was released on December 19, 2025, to a mostly positive critical reception and becoming a box-office success, grossing $169 million.

Its twelfth film, Paw Patrol: The Dino Movie, was released on August 14, 2026, to positive reviews from critics and becoming another box-office success, grossing $157.8 million.

In September 2026, Netflix and Paramount Skydance announced that their agreement would conclude after the releases of Ray Gunn and the untitled Jack and the Beanstalk project, with the latter assuming theatrical-first distribution for future projects. This includes Cosmic Motors, a new film directed by John Lasseter and co-directed by Louie del Carmen.

After Paramount Skydance acquired Warner Bros. Discovery in October 2026, it was announced in November that Dodge and Traci Balthazor would have interim oversight of operations at Warner Bros. Pictures Animation in addition to Paramount Animation, reporting to Skydance Motion Picture Group co-CEOs Dana Goldberg and Josh Greenstein.

== Logo ==
Initially, Paramount Animation did not have its own opening logo. Its first four features (as well as 2024's Transformers One) just used the standard Paramount logo.

On September 19, 2019, Paramount Animation introduced a new animated logo featuring a character nicknamed "Star Skipper". When Mireille Soria came to Paramount Animation, one of the first goals set by Jim Gianopulos was to make a logo for the division. The crew wanted to put a female character in the logo because the studio's team is mostly female, and according to Soria, it captures "the magic" of the division. The logo and the character of Star Skipper were designed by Captain Underpants: The First Epic Movie lead visual development artist and art director Christopher Zibach and animated by ATK PLN and Reel FX Creative Studios. The music is the same as the standard Paramount Pictures logo, which is composed by Michael Giacchino. This logo debuted in front of The SpongeBob Movie: Sponge on the Run in 2020 and appeared in the next three films: 2021's Rumble, 2023's Under the Boardwalk (except theatrical prints, which used the 2008 Nickelodeon Movies logo instead), and 2024's The Tiger's Apprentice.

Starting with 2025's Smurfs, an updated version of the Paramount Animation logo was introduced, with the Star Skipper mascot being quietly retired, and the logo now starts with the standard Paramount Pictures logo before transitioning into the Paramount Animation logo.

== Process ==
Similar to Warner Bros. Pictures Animation, Illumination, and Sony Pictures Animation, Paramount Animation outsources its animation production to other animation studios such as Mikros Image, Reel FX, and Industrial Light & Magic (Transformers One). Rumble was developed outside of Paramount Animation by Reel FX, but the studio acquired the rights to the film and co-produced it.

Like 20th Century Animation with animated films under 20th Century Studios, the studio also acts as somewhat of a distribution label for animated films that are made under or acquired by Paramount Pictures. The earliest case of this would be the aborted deal with Locksmith Animation. Additionally, Paws of Fury: The Legend of Hank, originally expected to be distributed by Open Road Films and STX Entertainment, was acquired by Paramount to be distributed under Paramount Animation, later being distributed under Nickelodeon Movies.

Paramount Animation does not have an in-house animation style. According to Mireille Soria, each film has its own unique style created by the filmmakers, which would be helped by outsourcing animation to different vendors.

When Ramsey Ann Naito took charge of Paramount Animation in September 2021, she brought over the culture of the Nickelodeon Animation Studio, which she describes as "artist-driven" and "creative". Both companies are now united under one team, in a move different from Disney and Universal's animation studios (Pixar and Walt Disney Animation Studios post-Lasseter for the former and Illumination and DreamWorks for the latter).

== Filmography ==
Release timeline
2015	The SpongeBob Movie: Sponge Out of Water
2016
2017	Monster Trucks
2018	Sherlock Gnomes
2019	Wonder Park
2020	The SpongeBob Movie: Sponge on the Run
2021	Rumble
2022
2023	Under the Boardwalk
2024	The Tiger's Apprentice
2024	Transformers One
2025	Smurfs
2025	The SpongeBob Movie: Search for SquarePants
2026	Paw Patrol: The Dino Movie
2027	Untitled Teenage Mutant Ninja Turtes: Mutant Mayhem sequel
2028	Freddy the 13th
2029	Untitled fourth Paw Patrol film

=== Released films ===
Films produced by Paramount Animation
Title	Release date	Director(s)	Writers(s)		Producer(s)	Composer(s)	Co-production with	Animation services
Title	Release date	Director(s)	Story	Screenplay	Producer(s)	Composer(s)	Co-production with	Animation services
The SpongeBob Movie: Sponge Out of Water (Note: Combines live-action with animation)	February 6, 2015	Paul Tibbitt Live-Action Direction: Mike Mitchell	Based on SpongeBob SquarePants created by: Stephen Hillenburg		Paul Tibbitt; Mary Parent	John Debney	Nickelodeon Movies; United Plankton Pictures	Rough Draft Studios Korea; Iloura
The SpongeBob Movie: Sponge Out of Water	February 6, 2015	Paul Tibbitt Live-Action Direction: Mike Mitchell	Stephen Hillenburg; Paul Tibbitt	Jonathan Aibel; Glenn Berger	Paul Tibbitt; Mary Parent	John Debney	Nickelodeon Movies; United Plankton Pictures	Rough Draft Studios Korea; Iloura
Monster Trucks	January 13, 2017	Chris Wedge	Matthew Robinson; Jonathan Aibel; Glenn Berger	Derek Connolly	Mary Parent; Denis L. Stewart	Dave Sardy	Nickelodeon Movies; Disruption Entertainment	Mr. X Moving Picture Company
Sherlock Gnomes	March 23, 2018	John Stevenson	Based on Sherlock Holmes created by: Arthur Conan Doyle and the characters created by: Rob Sprackling; John Smith; Andy Riley; Kevin Cecil; Kelly Asbury; Steve Hamilton Shaw		Steve Hamilton Shaw; David Furnish; Carolyn Soper	Chris Bacon (score) Elton John; Bernie Taupin (songs)	Metro-Goldwyn-Mayer; Rocket Pictures	Mikros Image; Reel FX Creative Studios
Sherlock Gnomes	March 23, 2018	John Stevenson	Andy Riley; Kevin Cecil; Emily Cook; Kathy Greenberg	Ben Zazove	Steve Hamilton Shaw; David Furnish; Carolyn Soper	Chris Bacon (score) Elton John; Bernie Taupin (songs)	Metro-Goldwyn-Mayer; Rocket Pictures	Mikros Image; Reel FX Creative Studios
Wonder Park	March 15, 2019	Dylan Brown (uncredited)	Robert Gordon; Josh Appelbaum; André Nemec	Josh Appelbaum; André Nemec	Josh Appelbaum; André Nemec; Kendra Haaland	Steven Price	Nickelodeon Movies; Ilion Animation Studios	Ilion Animation Studios
The SpongeBob Movie: Sponge on the Run	August 14, 2020 (Note: The SpongeBob Movie: Sponge on the Run was theatrically released on August 14, 2020, only in Canada. It was later released on Netflix internationally on November 5, 2020, and then on Paramount+ on March 4, 2021, in the United States.)	Tim Hill	Based on SpongeBob SquarePants created by: Stephen Hillenburg		Ryan Harris	Hans Zimmer; Steve Mazzaro	Nickelodeon Movies; United Plankton Pictures; MRC	Mikros Image
The SpongeBob Movie: Sponge on the Run	August 14, 2020	Tim Hill	Tim Hill; Jonathan Aibel; Glenn Berger	Tim Hill	Ryan Harris	Hans Zimmer; Steve Mazzaro	Nickelodeon Movies; United Plankton Pictures; MRC	Mikros Image
Rumble	December 15, 2021 (Note: Released on Paramount+.)	Hamish Grieve	Based on Monster on the Hill by: Rob Harrell		Brad Booker; Mark Bakshi	Lorne Balfe	WWE Studios; Walden Media; Reel FX Animation Studios	Reel FX Creative Studios
Rumble	December 15, 2021	Hamish Grieve	Hamish Grieve; Matt Lieberman		Brad Booker; Mark Bakshi	Lorne Balfe	WWE Studios; Walden Media; Reel FX Animation Studios	Reel FX Creative Studios
Under the Boardwalk	October 27, 2023 (Note: Limited theatrical release only under the Nickelodeon Movies imprint; released digitally and physically on November 7, 2023.)	David Soren	Lorene Scafaria; David Dobkin	Lorene Scafaria; David Soren	David Dobkin; Dagan Potter; Allison Gardner	John Debney; Jonathan Sadoff (score) Sean Douglas; Jonathan Sadoff (songs)	New Republic Pictures (uncredited); Big Kid Pictures	DNEG Animation
The Tiger's Apprentice	February 2, 2024	Raman Hui Co-directors: Paul Watling; Yong Duk Jhun	Based on the book by: Laurence Yep		Jane Startz; Sandra Rabins; Bob Persichetti	Steve Jablonsky	New Republic Pictures (uncredited); Jane Startz Productions	Mikros Animation
The Tiger's Apprentice	February 2, 2024	Raman Hui Co-directors: Paul Watling; Yong Duk Jhun	David Magee; Christopher Yost		Jane Startz; Sandra Rabins; Bob Persichetti	Steve Jablonsky	New Republic Pictures (uncredited); Jane Startz Productions	Mikros Animation
Transformers One	September 20, 2024	Josh Cooley	Based on the toy line by: Hasbro		Lorenzo di Bonaventura; Tom DeSanto; Don Murphy; Michael Bay; Mark Vahradian; Aaron Dem	Brian Tyler	Hasbro Entertainment; New Republic Pictures; Di Bonaventura Pictures; Bayhem Films	Industrial Light & Magic
Transformers One	September 20, 2024	Josh Cooley	Andrew Barrer; Gabriel Ferrari	Eric Pearson; Andrew Barrer; Gabriel Ferrari	Lorenzo di Bonaventura; Tom DeSanto; Don Murphy; Michael Bay; Mark Vahradian; Aaron Dem	Brian Tyler	Hasbro Entertainment; New Republic Pictures; Di Bonaventura Pictures; Bayhem Films	Industrial Light & Magic
Smurfs	July 18, 2025	Chris Miller Co-director: Matthew Landon	Based on The Smurfs by: Peyo		Ryan Harris; Rihanna; Laurence "Jay" Brown; Tyran "Ty-Ty" Smith	Henry Jackman (score) Rihanna (songs)		Cinesite Animation
Smurfs	July 18, 2025	Chris Miller Co-director: Matthew Landon	Pam Brady		Ryan Harris; Rihanna; Laurence "Jay" Brown; Tyran "Ty-Ty" Smith	Henry Jackman (score) Rihanna (songs)		Cinesite Animation
The SpongeBob Movie: Search for SquarePants	December 19, 2025	Derek Drymon	Based on SpongeBob SquarePants created by: Stephen Hillenburg		Pam Brady; Lisa Stewart; Aaron Dem	John Debney	Nickelodeon Movies; MRC	Cinesite; FuseFX; Reel FX Animation
The SpongeBob Movie: Search for SquarePants	December 19, 2025	Derek Drymon	Pam Brady; Kaz; Andrew Goodman	Pam Brady; Matt Lieberman	Pam Brady; Lisa Stewart; Aaron Dem	John Debney	Nickelodeon Movies; MRC	Cinesite; FuseFX; Reel FX Animation
Paw Patrol: The Dino Movie	August 14, 2026	Cal Brunker	Based on Paw Patrol created by: Keith Chapman		Jennifer Dodge; Laura Clunie; Toni Stevens	Pinar Toprak	Nickelodeon Movies; Spin Master Entertainment	Mikros Animation
Paw Patrol: The Dino Movie	August 14, 2026	Cal Brunker	Cal Brunker; Bob Barlen		Jennifer Dodge; Laura Clunie; Toni Stevens	Pinar Toprak	Nickelodeon Movies; Spin Master Entertainment	Mikros Animation

=== Short films ===
Title	Release date	Directed by	Animation services	Release with	Notes
Teenage Mutant Ninja Turtles: Chrome Alone 2 – Lost in New Jersey	December 19, 2025	Kent Seki	Mikros Animation	The SpongeBob Movie: Search for SquarePants	Theatrical release

=== Upcoming ===
Title	Release date	Director(s)	Writer(s)		Producer(s)	Co-production with	Animation service(s)	Production status						
Title	Release date	Director(s)	Untitled Teenage Mutant Ninja Turtles: Mutant Mayhem sequel	August 13, 2027	Producer(s)	Co-production with	Animation service(s)	Production status	Jeff Rowe Co-directors: Kyler Spears & Yashar Kassai	Based on the Teenage Mutant Ninja Turtles characters created by: Peter Laird & Kevin Eastman	Seth Rogen; Evan Goldberg; James Weaver; Ramsay McBean; Josh Fagen	Nickelodeon Movies; Point Grey Pictures	Mikros Animation	In production
Freddy the 13th	October 13, 2028	Dan Trachtenberg	Based on Freddy the 13th created by: Yehudi Mercado		Dan Trachtenberg; Ben Rosenblatt	TBA								
Untitled fourth Paw Patrol film	2029	Cal Brunker	Based on Paw Patrol created by: Keith Chapman		TBA	Nickelodeon Movies; Spin Master Entertainment	Mikros Animation	Pre-production						
Untitled fourth Paw Patrol film	2029	Cal Brunker	Cal Brunker; Bob Barlen		TBA	Nickelodeon Movies; Spin Master Entertainment	Mikros Animation	Pre-production						

==== In development ====
Title	Notes
C.O.S.M.O.S.	
Diya	co-production with Reel FX Animation, GoldDay and Good Karma Productions
Dropz	co-production with Gloria Sanchez Productions
Muttnik	co-production with Imagine Entertainment
The Naughty List	co-production with Troublemaker Studios
Once Upon a Motorcycle Dude	co-production with Sunswept Entertainment
Rainbow Serpent	co-production with Imagine Entertainment
Real Pigeons Fight Crime	
Superworld	co-production with Temple Hill Entertainment
Swan Lake	co-production with Temple Hill Entertainment
Untitled Mighty Mouse film	co-production with Maximum Effort
Untitled Mindy Kaling comedy	
Untitled Spice Girls film	co-production with 19 Entertainment
Untitled Survivor film	co-production with Castaway Productions, Survivor Productions, LLC, and CBS Studios
Untitled Trevor Noah animated film	co-production with Day Zero Productions and Mainstay Entertainment
Yokai Samba	co-production with Nickelodeon Movies

== Cancelled or inactive projects ==
Title	Description
The New Kid	Feature film based on the comic Penny Arcade. Announced in June 2011, the project was canceled by 2016 due to leadership changes at Paramount Pictures despite the script being complete.
Shedd	Announced in January 2014 with John Kahrs joining as the director and was based on an original idea by Adam Goodman.
Giant Monsters Attack Japan	Originally announced in 2006 as a live-action Nickelodeon Movies production from Matt Stone and Trey Parker, the film moved to Paramount Animation in 2015 with a script written by Matt Lieberman.
Bodacious	Announced in October 2015 as an animated feature produced by Eddie Murphy based on the infamous bull of the same name.
Untitled sci-fi film	Paramount Animation acquired the rights to an untitled sci-fi pitch from screenwriter David Frigerio in October 2015, which was described as "tonally Cars set in space".
The Flamingo Affair	Announced in June 2016 as a co-production with J.J. Abrams through Bad Robot with a script written by Pamela Pettler. The film was described as a comedic Ocean's Eleven-style heist film with animals in Las Vegas.
Adventures in Wonder Park	Prior to Wonder Park's release, Paramount Animation announced a television series based on the film, titled Adventures in Wonder Park, to debut on Nickelodeon after the film's theatrical release. Although a trailer for the series was attached to the Blu-ray release of the film, and its first season, consisting of 20 episodes, was completed between 2019 and early 2020, there have been no updates from Nickelodeon on the project as of 2023. The animatic of the pilot was later posted online in December 2022.
The Shrinking of Treehorn	Announced in June 2019 with Ron Howard directing. The film was slated for release on November 10, 2023, but in May 2022, Netflix acquired the distribution rights. However, in July 2024, it was reported that the film was cancelled.

== Reception ==
=== Box office performance ===
Film	Budget	North America		Overseas gross	Worldwide gross (unadjusted)	Ref(s)
Film	Budget	Opening	Gross (unadjusted)	Overseas gross	Worldwide gross (unadjusted)	Ref(s)
The SpongeBob Movie: Sponge Out of Water	$74 million	$55,365,012	$162,994,032	$162,192,000	$325,186,032	
Monster Trucks	$125 million	$10,950,705	$33,370,166	$31,123,749	$64,493,915	
Sherlock Gnomes	$59 million	$10,604,774	$43,242,871	$47,254,907	$90,497,778	
Wonder Park	$80–100 million	$15,853,646	$45,216,793	$74,342,317	$119,559,110	
The SpongeBob Movie: Sponge on the Run	$60 million	$865,824	$4,810,790	—N/a	$4,810,790	
The Tiger's Apprentice	—N/a	—N/a	—N/a	$789,002	$789,002	
Transformers One	$75–147 million	$24,613,970	$59,098,421	$70,309,971	$129,408,392	
Smurfs	$58 million	$11,075,090	$31,075,170	$93,082,186	$124,157,356	
The SpongeBob Movie: Search for SquarePants	$64 million	$15,611,344	$71,068,170	$98,082,207	$169,150,377	
Paw Patrol: The Dino Movie	$40 million	$20,254,688	$53,062,426	$104,700,000	$157,762,426	

=== Critical and public response ===
Film	Critical		Public
Film	Rotten Tomatoes	Metacritic	CinemaScore
The SpongeBob Movie: Sponge Out of Water	81% (103 reviews)	62 (27 reviews)	B
Monster Trucks	32% (97 reviews)	41 (23 reviews)	A
Sherlock Gnomes	28% (65 reviews)	36 (14 reviews)	B+
Wonder Park	35% (107 reviews)	45 (22 reviews)	B+
The SpongeBob Movie: Sponge on the Run	66% (74 reviews)	65 (17 reviews)	—N/a
Rumble	47% (15 reviews)	48 (5 reviews)	—N/a
The Tiger's Apprentice	50% (36 reviews)	55 (8 reviews)	
Transformers One	89% (171 reviews)	65 (31 reviews)	A
Smurfs	21% (101 reviews)	31 (27 reviews)	B+
The SpongeBob Movie: Search for SquarePants	79% (72 reviews)	65 (17 reviews)	A–
Paw Patrol: The Dino Movie	82% (34 reviews)	47 (4 reviews)	A

=== Accolades ===
==== Annie Awards ====
Year	Film	Category	Recipient(s)	Result	Refs
2016	The SpongeBob Movie: Sponge Out of Water	Animated Effects in an Animated Production	Brice Mallier, Paul Buckley, Brent Droog, Alex Whyte and Jonothan Freisler	Nominated	
2016	The SpongeBob Movie: Sponge Out of Water	Voice Acting in an Animated Feature Production	Tom Kenny	Nominated	
2025	Transformers One	Voice Acting in an Animated Feature Production	Brian Tyree Henry	Nominated	
2026	The SpongeBob Movie: Search for SquarePants	Best Character Design - Feature	Adam Paloian, Thaddeus Couldron, Alvi Ramirez	Nominated	

==== Golden Raspberry Awards ====
Year	Film	Category	Recipient(s)	Result	Ref.
2018	Sherlock Gnomes	Worst Actor	Johnny Depp	Nominated	
2018	Sherlock Gnomes	Worst Screen Combo	Johnny Depp	Nominated	
2018	Sherlock Gnomes	Worst Screen Combo	His fast-fading film career	Nominated	
2025	Smurfs	Worst Remake, Rip-off or Sequel	Smurfs	Nominated	
2025	Smurfs	Worst Screen Combo	James Corden & Rihanna	Nominated	

==== Nickelodeon Kids Choice Awards ====
Year	Film	Category	Recipient(s)	Result	Ref.
The SpongeBob Movie: Sponge on the Run	—N/a				
The SpongeBob Movie: Sponge on the Run	Favorite Voice from an Animated Movie	Awkwafina (also for Raya and the Last Dragon)			
The SpongeBob Movie: Sponge on the Run	Favorite Voice from an Animated Movie	Tom Kenny			
The SpongeBob Movie: Sponge on the Run	Favorite Voice from an Animated Movie	Keanu Reeves			
2026	The SpongeBob Movie: Search for SquarePants	—N/a	Pending		
2026	Avatar Aang: The Last Airbender	—N/a	Pending		
2026	Paw Patrol: The Dino Movie	—N/a	Pending		
2026	Paw Patrol: The Dino Movie	Favorite Female Animated Voice from a Movie	Mckenna Grace	Pending	
2026	Favorite Male Animated Voice from a Movie	The SpongeBob Movie: Search for SquarePants	Tom Kenny	Pending	
2026	Favorite Villain	The SpongeBob Movie: Search for SquarePants	Mark Hamill as The Flying Dutchman	Pending	
2026	Favorite Song from a Movie	The SpongeBob Movie: Search for SquarePants	Ice Spice ("Big Guy")	Pending	

== See also ==
- Skydance Animation
- Nickelodeon Movies
- Nickelodeon Animation Studio
- DreamWorks Animation
- Miramax Animation
- Terrytoons
- List of Paramount Pictures theatrical animated feature films
- List of animation studios owned by Paramount Skydance
