= Dragon's Gate (novel) =

1995 book by Laurence Yep

- First edition
- Author: Laurence Yep
- Language: English
- Series: Golden Mountain Chronicles
- Genre: Children's literature, historical fiction
- Published: HarperCollins (1995)
- Publication place: United States
- Media type: Paperback
- Pages: 352
- ISBN: 0-06-440489-7
- Preceded by: Mountain Light
- Followed by: The Traitor

Dragon's Gate is a children's historical novel by Laurence Yep, published by HarperCollins in 1995. It inaugurated the Golden Mountain Chronicles and is the third chronicle in narrative sequence among ten published as of 2012.

Yep and Dragon's Gate received a Newbery Honor in 1994.

== Plot ==
Otter is a fourteen-year-old Chinese boy growing up during the opium wars and the oppression of the Manchu dynasty. He wishes to travel to America, to the Land of the Golden Mountain called California, so he can assist his Uncle Foxfire and father in the doing of the Great Work - their clan's dedication to taking back their country from the Manchu invaders and reestablishing the Ming dynasty. Yet with much disdain, he decides to remain in Three Willows to be with his mother, Cassia.

After accidentally killing a Manchu soldier, Otter's life is in great peril. As a result, he is sent to America to join his father and uncle. Originally enthralled by this turn of events, Otter quickly realizes life in the Golden Mountain is a far cry from his dreams. Soon, Otter's dream becomes a nightmare as he struggles to persevere in a new, unfamiliar land filled with harsh conditions and even harsher people.

== Golden Mountain Chronicles ==
The family saga follows the Young family, initially in China. Dragons of Silk (2011) spans a few generations and brings the story to the present; nine previous novels have been dated 1849 to 1995.

1. The Serpent's Children, set in 1849 (1984)
2. Mountain Light, 1855 (1985)
3. Dragon's Gate, 1867 (1993)
4. The Traitor, 1885 (2003)
5. Dragonwings, 1903 (1975)
6. Dragon Road, 1939 (2007); originally The Red Warrior
7. Child of the Owl, 1960 (1977)
8. Sea Glass, 1970 (1979)
9. Thief of Hearts, 1995 (1995)
10. Dragons of Silk, 1835-2011 (2011)

Four of the ten historical novels are among Yep's five works most widely held in WorldCat libraries.
