= The Tiger's Apprentice (film) =

2024 American animated fantasy film

- Promotional release poster
- Directed by: Raman Hui
- Screenplay by: David Magee; Christopher Yost
- Based on: The Tiger's Apprentice by Laurence Yep
- Produced by: Jane Startz; Sandra Rabins; Bob Persichetti
- Starring: Brandon Soo Hoo; Henry Golding; Lucy Liu; Sandra Oh; Michelle Yeoh
- Edited by: Wayne Wahrman
- Music by: Steve Jablonsky
- Production companies: Paramount Animation; Jane Startz Productions; New Republic Pictures
- Distributed by: Paramount+
- Release dates: January 27, 2024 (Los Angeles); February 2, 2024 (United States)
- Running time: 84 minutes
- Country: United States
- Language: English
- Box office: $789,002

The Tiger's Apprentice is a 2024 American animated fantasy film based on the 2003 novel by Laurence Yep. Produced by Paramount Animation and Jane Startz Productions, it is directed by Raman Hui and co-directed by Paul Watling and Yong Duk Jhun (in their directorial debuts) from a screenplay by David Magee and Christopher Yost. The film stars the voices of Brandon Soo Hoo, Henry Golding, Lucy Liu, Sandra Oh, and Michelle Yeoh.

Cartoon Network originally opted to produce a live-action/CG hybrid television film adaptation of the novel in the late 2000s, but it never came to fruition. Paramount later acquired the rights for an animated film in March 2019, with Carlos Baena attached as director. Mikros Animation provided animation. Much of the voice cast was revealed between 2020 and 2022, following Golding's casting in July 2020. Hui later replaced Baena as director in January 2022. Steve Jablonsky composed the score.

Originally planned for theatrical release by Paramount Pictures, The Tiger's Apprentice was released on Paramount+ on February 2, 2024, after being delayed several times due to the COVID-19 pandemic, although it received a theatrical release in Australia and New Zealand in April. The film received mixed reviews from critics.

== Plot ==
In 2009 in Hong Kong, Mrs. Lee and her baby grandson Tom are chased by yaoguai. Mrs. Lee fends them off with the help of the Zodiac Warriors, a group of shapeshifters rooted in the Chinese zodiac, before confronting Ms. Penny Loo, a sorceress controlling the yaoguai.

15 years later, Tom, now living with his grandmother in San Francisco, faces a bully at school, partially for the Chinese appearance of his house, when he inadvertently unleashes a magical force. After school, Tom removes some charms from his home, which unbeknownst to him were protecting against the evil spirits. Soon after, Mr. Hu, the tiger of the Warriors, visits after sensing that the charms have been dispatched. During the fight, Mrs. Lee throws the stone to Tom, making him the guardian right at that moment, before activating all the protective charms together, which results in a blast intended to kill her and Loo, but the latter survives.

Hu brings Tom to a safe place where he learns of the Zodiac Warriors and how they swore to protect the guardian. Later that night, Tom has a dream where he sees a bright Phoenix being covered in darkness, and a woman tells her that now he walks two worlds: the world of mortals and the world of magic. Soon the whole group of Zodiac Warriors are reunited at the Temple of Twelve. However, some of the Zodiac Warriors don't show up, which leads to an uneasy situation. In the meantime, Tom goes to confront Loo, who's revealed to be the mother of Räv, the new student at Tom's school. The Zodiac Warriors arrive, learning that the missing members were captured by Loo, and another few become trapped as well. Tom, Räv, and the remaining members eventually escape.

Tom focuses on his training. To gain complete power as a guardian, he must be able to see the Phoenix inside the stone, which Tom's lineage can see. Mistral, the dragon, tells Tom one night that during the fight between Mrs. Lee and Loo, Hu died protecting him. After defeating Loo in the battle, Mrs. Lee gives a part of her soul to save Hu. Tom overhears Hu saying he may never be able to see the Phoenix and feeling lost, he goes to his old home. Tom then sees his grandmother but Räv appears and tell him it is a trick and it's really Loo. As they are escaping, Loo steals the Phoenix Stone from him.

After Tom informs the Warriors, Hu reveals that Loo will use the stone on the eve of the Lunar New Year when the sun sets. On that day, Tom and the Warriors find Loo and a large battle ensues. Hu is briefly captured, but with Räv's help, he and the other Warriors are freed. However, Loo activates the Phoenix stone to suck all the souls out of the mortals. Just then, Tom finally sees the Phoenix inside the stone. Tom removes the darkness torturing the Phoenix, reversing the effects and defeating Loo. Tom's sacrifice results in his death and his soul is about to leave his body. Hu, with the help of the other Zodiac Warriors, performs Nu Kua, which leads him to the Ocean of Tears. There, Hu pleads to the Empress to give away a part of his soul to save Tom, which is accepted. Later, Hu offers his shop as Tom's new home.

In a mid-credit scene, Tom, as a result of containing part of Hu's soul, is able to transform into a tiger.

== Voice cast ==
- Brandon Soo Hoo as Tom Lee
  - Lydie Loots as Baby Tom
- Henry Golding as Ted Hu the Tiger guardian
- Lucy Liu as Nu Kua the Empress / Cynthia
- Sandra Oh as Mistral the Dragon guardian
- Michelle Yeoh as Penny Loo
- Bowen Yang as Sidney the Rat guardian
- Leah Lewis as Räv
- Kheng Hua Tan as Diane Lee
- Sherry Cola as Naomi the Monkey guardian
- Deborah S. Craig as Pig
- Jo Koy as Rooster
- Greta Lee as Rabbit
- Diana Lee Inosanto as Horse
- Patrick Gallagher as Dog
- Poppy Liu as Snake
- Josh Zuckerman as Rudy
- Ryan Christopher Lee as Liam
- Raman Hui as Radio Announcer

== Production ==
=== Development ===
In October 2008, Cartoon Network announced a television film adaptation of Laurence Yep's 2003 novel, The Tiger's Apprentice, set to premiere on the network in 2010. Produced by Cartoon Network Studios, the film would have been a live-action/CG hybrid, with David Magee penning the screenplay and Jane Startz executive producing. The project never came to fruition.

In March 2019, Paramount Pictures announced an animated adaptation of the novel set to be theatrically released in February 2022. In June 2019, Paramount Animation announced that Carlos Baena would direct the film, with Magee and Harry Cripps writing the screenplay, Startz producing, and Raman Hui and Kane Lee executive producing. In July 2020, the film was delayed until February 2023 due to the COVID-19 pandemic. In January 2022, it was revealed that Hui would instead direct the film, with Paul Watling and Yong Duk Jhun co-directing and Bob Persichetti producing. Baena would still remain in an executive producer role. New Republic Pictures co-financed the film.

=== Casting ===
In July 2020, Henry Golding was cast in the film as Mr. Hu. In September 2020, Sandra Oh was cast in the film as Mistral, with Michelle Yeoh, Brandon Soo Hoo, Bowen Yang, Sherry Cola, and Kheng Hua Tan also added to the cast in unspecified roles. In November 2020, Leah Lewis was cast in the film as Räv. In July 2022, it emerged that Lucy Liu had been added to the cast in a starring role. In December 2023, along with the trailer, it was revealed that Deborah S. Craig, Jo Koy, Greta Lee, Diana Lee Inosanto, Patrick Gallagher, and Poppy Lui had joined the cast.

=== Animation ===
Animation was provided by Mikros Animation in Paris. The film had a team of 80 animators and had a 4-year production. Animators from Spain, England, Belgium and Canada did remote work.

=== Post-production ===
Post-production was finished in mid-2023. On the day the film was released, two crew members who worked on the film revealed on Letterboxd that the film went through a turbulent production. The first user, identified as didiwa, cited harassment and rewrites occurring until 2023, along with some of the production crew doing multiple jobs and working several pay grades above actual roles, with no vacation allowed while others flew across Europe with paid expenses. Devon Manney, the second user, worked as an apprentice story artist from June to December 2019, and was laid off with the rest of the story team a few days before Christmas of that year, saying that Paramount "wanted to make a Spider-Verse knock off".

==== Music ====
In December 2023, it was announced that Steve Jablonsky would compose the film's score. Survivor's "Eye of the Tiger" was covered by Zhu and released on January 26, 2024. Japanese girl group Atarashii Gakko! released the song "Hello" from the movie's soundtrack as a single on February 9, 2024.

== Release ==
The Tiger's Apprentice had its world premiere in Los Angeles on January 27, 2024, and was released by Paramount+ on February 2, 2024. It was given a theatrical release in Australia on April 4.

The film was originally scheduled for theatrical release by Paramount Pictures on February 11, 2022, but due to the COVID-19 pandemic, it was delayed until February 10, 2023, and later December 20, 2023. It was then further delayed to January 19, 2024. However, in September 2023, the film was removed from Paramount's theatrical release schedule and was moved to a streaming release on Paramount+ on an unspecified 2024 date instead. In December 2023, along with the teaser trailer, the film's final release date was revealed.

== Reception ==
=== Box office ===
During its debut weekend in Australia (April 4th-7th), The Tiger's Apprentice grossed $116,100 from 246 theaters (with a per-theater average of $471), finishing at 8th place in a weekend led by Kung Fu Panda 4. By July 7th, the film grossed a total of $649,812 in Australia, with an additional gross of $139,190 in New Zealand, resulting in a box office total of $789,002.

=== Critical reception ===
On the review aggregator website Rotten Tomatoes, 50% of 36 critics' reviews are positive. The website's consensus reads: "Though offering polished animation and appealing voice work, The Tiger's Apprentice can't prevent its patchwork of familiar tropes and sluggish plotting from dulling its vibrant mythology." Metacritic, which uses a weighted average, assigned the film a score of 55 out of 100, based on eight critics, indicating "mixed or average" reviews.
