= Dragon Steel =

1985 novel by Laurence Yep

- First edition
- Author: Laurence Yep
- Cover artist: David Wiesner
- Language: English language
- Series: Dragon
- Genre: Fantasy novel
- Publisher: Harper & Row
- Publication date: 1985
- Publication place: United States
- Media type: Print (hardback & paperback)
- Pages: 276 pp
- ISBN: 0-06-026748-8
- OCLC: 11370782
- LC Class: PZ7.Y44 Dqn 1985
- Preceded by: Dragon of the Lost Sea (1982)
- Followed by: Dragon Cauldron (1991)

Dragon Steel is a fantasy novel by American author Laurence Yep. It was first published in 1985 and is the second book in his Dragon series. In Dragon Steel, Yep decided to expand on the dilemma faced by exiled dragon princess Shimmer, that of how to govern, since she had been exiled from the Inland Sea at a relatively young age by dragon standards. He based her on experiences on a study of historical rulers, both those who had ruled poorly, and those who had "risen to the expectations of their people". He also based the undersea dragon kingdom of Sambar XII on the "real ocean", inspired by the undergraduate courses in marine biology and oceanography he had taken at UC Santa Cruz. The story picks up where Dragon of the Lost Sea left off. Coming off their victory over the witch Civet, Shimmer and her human companion Thorn discover inner turmoil among the dragon kingdoms amidst increasing tensions between the humans and the dragons, gaining a new ally in the process.

== Plot summary ==
Shimmer and Thorn, transporting a disabled Civet, are met with a hostile reception while flying over the human capital of Ramsgate. The biggest threat to them is a massive, enchanted bird of fire, which they narrowly manage to escape and defeat after luring it out to sea. Arriving at an outpost of her uncle, High King of the Dragons Sambar XII, Shimmer does not receive the warm reception that she was expecting from the guards, but convinces their commander to let her see her uncle. On the way to his underwater palace, she discovers that relations between the humans and dragons have deteriorated as a result of increasingly provocative actions on the part of the human king known as the Butcher.

The reception at Sambar's court does not get any better, as Sambar is not impressed by Shimmer's news that she has defeated Civet nor is he mollified when Civet and the Keeper's mist stone are presented to him as gifts, as he covets Shimmer's dream pearl. Shimmer creates an illusionary pearl to hand over, but Thorn, not knowing what she is up to, tries to take it back forcefully, getting them both thrown into the dungeons. There they meet Monkey, who was caught trying to steal Baldy's cauldron and has had a magical needle implanted in him which prevents him from using magic and cannot be removed without killing him. Thorn and Shimmer are placed in a cell, but Shimmer manages to create illusionary needles to take the place of the ones meant to restrain them. When they are left alone, Indigo, a servant girl working in the dungeons, helps them escape by suggesting that Shimmer try changing the tumblers on the locks to their chains and cell door. However Shimmer is unable to free Monkey, who suggests that he bring her a flower so that he can attempt to summon the Lord of the Flowers, a very ancient and powerful, yet whimsical being, one of the Five Masters, and the only person he can contact from his cell. Indigo, seeking a chance to escape the palace, convinces Shimmer to take her along, but earns Thorn's jealousy.

The three manage to escape the palace after the alarm is sounded by being disguised as fish. Making their way out into the open ocean in the opposite direction of their anticipated escape route, they eventually run into a raiding party of krakens. Shimmer returns to her dragon form to fight them, but is outnumbered despite Thorn and Indigo's best efforts as fish to help her. Defeat seems certain until a patrol of dragons arrives. They turn out to be members of Shimmer's clan from the Inland Sea, who welcome her back and are overjoyed at the news of Civet being captured. Shimmer, Indigo and Thorn are taken to an underwater mountain fort and welcomed by hundreds of Inland Sea dragons from the oldest to the youngest, all battle-scarred, ready to fight, and bearing signs of the treatment they have had to put up with from Sambar. At the fort Shimmer discovers that a single stalk of a flower known as Ebony's tears, which used to grow abundantly around the shores of the Inland Sea, still exists and was magically preserved, having become a symbol to the entire clan. It is currently being guarded by a branch of the clan led by Lady Francolin, Shimmer's former history teacher. Shimmer seeks Lady Francolin out, who lives the undersea volcanoes where the Inland Sea dragons forge dragon steel, "the truest of all metals", which never rusts nor breaks and is so strong because it is "tempered long and often", which the dragons use for their weapons.

Shimmer is able to convince Lady Francolin to relinquish Ebony's tears, and she, Thorn and Indigo manage to sneak back into the palace in disguise with the flower. The plan is nearly ruined when some guards find and decide to eat some of it, although Indigo is able to save some of its blooms. After foiling an attempt by Sambar's grand mage disguised as Monkey, he manages to summon the Lord of the Flowers, who agrees to help them by removing the needle implanted in Monkey and giving them access to Sambar's treasure vault where Baldy's cauldron is stored for 1,000 seconds. In the vault, they manage to fight off a massive guardian creature and Sambar's guards, retrieve Civet, Monkey's rod, and the cauldron, barely managing to escape, but the cauldron gets cracked in the process. Shimmer and her companions are then transported to Indigo's homeland, the massive forest known as Green Darkness on her request and left there. Monkey reverses the spell that transformed his hair into a chain that Civet had swallowed, and Shimmer strikes a bargain with her for help in restoring the Inland Sea in return for letting her settle in the Green Darkness. Indigo's homecoming proves to be bittersweet as she finds that much of the forest has been chopped down to construct warships and the young people of her village conscripted as labor. Shimmer and Thorn convince Indigo to come with them, just as war between the humans and dragons begins.

== Reception ==
Kirkus Reviews commented that "though Yep is as imaginative as the next fantasist in dreaming up shapes, tricks, and surprises, it sometimes seems, as Shimmer comments upon the sudden appearance of a threatening Flame Bird, that "someone [is] working magic for no apparent reason"". School Library Journal wrote that "the series as a whole promises to be an original approach to friendship on a quest...Fantasy readers will want to start with the Dragons of the Lost Sea and libraries should plan to purchase the whole series". The Voice of Youth Advocates described it as "a fable which is readable, especially for middle and junior high students, on two levels: first, as enjoyable reading and, second, as an allegory of perseverance and loyalty". Booklist commented that "morality is sometimes heavy-handed...But the outlaw dragon and her orphaned human companions are strong and touching in their search for a home". Dragon Steel was listed as one of the Child Study Association of America's Children's Books of the Year for 1986.

== Release details ==
- April 1985, HarperCollins Children's Books, hardcover, ISBN 0-06-026748-8
- 1985, HarperCollins Children's Books, paperback
- September 1993, HarperTrophy, paperback, ISBN 0-06-440486-2
- October 1999, Tandem Library, library binding, ISBN 0-7857-0923-1
