= Dragon of the Lost Sea =

1982 novel by Laurence Yep

- First edition
- Author: Laurence Yep
- Original title: The Green Darkness
- Cover artist: David Wiesner
- Language: English
- Series: Dragon
- Genre: Fantasy novel
- Publisher: Harper & Row
- Publication date: 1982
- Publication place: United States
- Media type: Print (hardback, paperback), audio cassette
- Pages: 213 pp
- ISBN: 0-06-026746-1
- OCLC: 8386889
- LC Class: PZ7.Y44 Dq 1982
- Preceded by: N/A
- Followed by: Dragon Steel (1985)

Dragon of the Lost Sea is a fantasy novel by American author Laurence Yep. It was first published in 1982 and is the first book in his Dragon series. Having already written several books, Yep had wanted to adapt Chinese mythology into a fantasy form for some time, and began writing the story in 1980 after undertaking careful research. He had originally intended to adapt a Chinese folktale in which the Monkey King captured a river spirit who had flooded an entire city, which he at first tried to conceive in picture book form.

However, he kept questioning the motivations of the river spirit, who he had renamed Civet. As his outline ballooned exponentially from eight to 800 pages in an attempt to do so, he realized that he would need a series as opposed to just one book to tell her story. Dragon of the Lost Sea, the first book in this series, was originally titled The Green Darkness after Civet's forest home. In a 2002 interview, Yep states that "toward the end of the book I introduced two minor characters, a dragon and her pet boy, who became such vivid characters for me that I finally realized that the story had to be about them". He then "had to tear up almost everything and rebuilt the story" around the two.

The plot centers on an exiled dragon princess named Shimmer, who undertakes a quest to restore her homeland, the Inland Sea, which is now known as the Lost Sea after its waters were sealed up in the form of a blue pebble by a powerful witch named Civet. She gains an unlikely ally in the form of a young, orphaned human teenager named Thorn. Yep wrote Dragon of the Lost Sea at the same time he wrote The Mark Twain Murders as he frequently writes several books simultaneously, but in different genres as he often gets writer's block.

== Plot summary ==
Shimmer, an exiled dragon princess traveling incognito in human form, senses powerful magic emanating from a small village. Investigating its source, she determines that it is the witch Civet, who sealed up the waters of her homeland, the Inland Sea, centuries ago in the form of a blue pebble, now making it known as the Lost Sea. Civet is staying at a local inn in disguise. Shimmer soon encounters a young, orphaned kitchen servant named Thorn who is being harassed by the local children because he claims to have seen the mythical Unicorn, one of the Five Masters. Supporting him, Shimmer is defended by Thorn when the children are about to turn on her, earning a beating from his master the innkeeper. She visits Thorn at the inn out of gratitude, and accepts his offer of a meal and a place to stay for the night, having never met with such hospitality during all her years of exile. Later that night, she saves Thorn from an attack by one of Civet's servants, an enchanted paper warrior sent to kill him because of his purported Unicorn sighting. The two are forced to flee the village after Shimmer defends Thorn against his master. To escape, Shimmer uses the dream pearl, a treasure which she was exiled for supposedly stealing hundreds of years ago, to change into her true form as a dragon in order fly away with Thorn.

During the course of their flight, Thorn resolves to stay with Shimmer and help her with her quest, which she reluctantly accepts. The two fly to the forest of the Keeper, a once powerful wizard known for keeping a "menagerie of monstrous pets", where Shimmer believes Civet is headed. In the ruins of his former city, they encounter the Keeper, who still has enough magic left to have recreated some of his pets. He reveals that Civet was able to steal his mist stone, a gem which can turn its user's form into cloud. Shimmer realizes that this will now make him covet her dream pearl. The Keeper tries to take it, but Shimmer and Thorn manage to escape. Pursued by the Keeper and his pets for hours, Shimmer manages to defeat them in an aerial battle near her former home, the Lost Sea, but her wing is injured and she is forced to land. She and Thorn have to traverse the vast expanse of salt the Lost Sea has now become for a few days on foot on the trail of Civet, who is bound for the city of River Glen, a city the dragons of the Inland Sea used to trade with.

At River Glen, Shimmer and Thorn encounter Monkey, a powerful mage and formerly notorious troublemaker who has been charged by his master, a wizard known as the Old Boy, with protecting River Glen from Civet. Monkey welcomes Shimmer and Thorn, but drugs their tea, putting them to sleep to prevent them from interfering with his plan to apprehend Civet singlehandedly. Civet herself attempts to get into River Glen in disguise, but does not fool Monkey. Before he can subdue her, she manages to unleash the waters of the Lost Sea by destroying the blue pebble, leaving River Glen nearly totally submerged. Civet escapes by using the mist stone that she stole from the Keeper to transform herself into cloud. Monkey decides to try to steal the magical cauldron, known as 'Baldy's Cauldron', from Shimmer's uncle, the High King of the Dragons, to boil the waters of the Lost Sea away. Shimmer tries to convince Thorn to go with him so he can be brought to a human city, but he vows to stay with her and help her catch Civet. Monkey gives them one of his hairs which will turn into an unbreakable magic chain on command to help. Shimmer and Thorn then set off for Civet's lair, the Weeping Mountain.

At Weeping Mountain, they manage to fight their way past various opponents to reach a cavern where they summon Civet, who manages to capture them both despite having used up a great deal of her magic by having destroyed the blue pebble. As she is about to kill Shimmer, Thorn is able to convince her to allow him to prepare a meal for her because all her paper servants have been destroyed. During the meal, Civet reveals her past, which Shimmer was previously unaware of. She was a teenager from River Glen who was demanded as a bride by the King Within the River, a powerful magical being who could have destroyed River Glen at will. Her body was preserved as it was at the time of her death by drowning to join her husband, but she resented her marriage because the King was hideous and kept her sequestered in his palace. It took her a thousand years to learn enough magic from him to be able to turn him into a stone and escape, by which time River Glen had been transformed from a village into a prosperous, industrial city which had grown wealthy from its trade with the dragons of the Inland Sea. Wanting revenge against both the dragons and River Glen led Civet to seal up the waters of the Inland Sea and use them to punish River Glen.

After she finishes her story, Thorn manages to disable Civet with Monkey's hair that he had planted in her noodles, which turns into a chain that gets into her stomach. After Shimmer is freed, she tries to kill Civet but cannot, because her perception of her has changed, making her realize that they are both alike in that they have lost their former homes. However the spell on Monkey's hair cannot be undone, leaving Civet paralyzed. Shimmer decides that the chain disabling Civet can be removed for any help she can give in restoring the Lost Sea, but she will need to journey to the dragon kingdoms in search of Monkey or a powerful mage. Thorn is determined to go with her, after which the two acknowledge their partnership and informally "adopt" each other before setting off.

== Reception ==
Dragon of the Lost Sea was positively received and has been used as a teaching tool. Booklist said that "dramatic tension stays high. Weaves Chinese legend into an exciting tapestry of myth and folklore". It was one of the American Library Association's Notable Children's Books of 1982 and was named as one of the 100 Favorite Paperbacks of 1989 by the International Reading Association and Children's Book Council. It made the William Allen White Children's Book Award Master List for 1984–1985, but did not win the William Allen White Children's Book Award for 1985.

== Release details ==
- January 1982, Harper & Row, hardcover, ISBN 0-06-026746-1
- October 1982, Harper & Row, paperback, 0-06-026747-X
- 1988, Tandem Library Books, paperback, ISBN 0-606-03773-X
- 1988, Sagebrush Education Resources, paperback, ISBN 0-8335-4632-5
- June 1988, Peter Smith Pub, Inc., ISBN 0-8446-6816-8
- June 1988, HarperCollins, paperback, ISBN 0-06-440227-4
- July 1994, Demco Media, turtleback, ISBN 0-606-03773-X
- 1995, Peter Smith Publishing, Inc., ISBN 0-8446-6816-8
- October 1999, Tandem Library, library binding, ISBN 0-8335-4632-5
