= Cockroach Cooties =

2000 novel by Laurence Yep

- First edition
- Author: Laurence Yep
- Language: English
- Series: Later, Gator
- Publication place: United States
- Media type: Print (hardback, paperback)
- Preceded by: Later, Gator
- Followed by: Skunk Scout

Cockroach Cooties is a 2000 children's novel by Laurence Yep.

== Plot summary ==
Two brothers, Teddy and Bobby, try to defend themselves from a school bully named Arnie. The brothers discover that the bully is afraid of cockroaches. Bobby finds a cockroach and names it Hercules. Bobby uses cookies with strange ingredients to trick Arnie into a peace treaty. With the help of Hercules, the boys figure out what is happening to the bully.

== Reception ==
It was a William Allen book nominee. It won the Iowa Children's Choice Award, the Texas Bluebonnet Award, the Kentucky Book Award, and the Laura Ingalls Book Award. A Publishers Weekly review says, "An altogether chipper outing". Rebecca McCartney, of Burlington Public Library, reviewed the book saying, "I liked this book because it was full of creepy crawly things, and told with humor and warmth".
