= The Tiger's Apprentice =

2003 book by Laurence Yep

- First edition
- Author: Laurence Yep
- Cover artist: Winslow Pels
- Language: English
- Series: The Tiger's Apprentice
- Genre: Fantasy
- Published: 2003 (HarperCollins)
- Publication place: United States
- Media type: Print (hardback, paperback)
- Pages: 184
- ISBN: 978-0060010157
- Followed by: Tiger's Blood

The Tiger's Apprentice is an action-adventure fantasy novel by American author Laurence Yep. It was published in 2003 as the first in The Tiger's Apprentice trilogy. This story inserts ancient Chinese mythology into modern life in San Francisco. The story follows the boy Tom as he becomes the magical apprentice of the tiger Mr. Hu. Together with a band of mythological misfits, their job is to protect the ancient phoenix from Vatten and the Clan of Nine who wish to use its powers for evil.

== Plot summary ==
Tom, a young Chinese American boy, has grown up under the care of his eccentric grandmother, Mrs. Lee, in San Francisco. He is her reluctant apprentice Guardian, learning ancient Chinese magic to protect a coral rose. However, upon the arrival of Mr. Hu, a tiger and Mrs. Lee's former apprentice, monsters attack. Mrs. Lee dies protecting Tom and the rose, leaving Mr. Hu the guardian of both Tom and the coral rose. (pg. 25–26)

Safe in Mr. Hu's antique shop in Chinatown, Mr. Hu reveals that the coral rose is actually the phoenix which has the power to transform evil beings into good ones. In ancient Chinese mythology, the creature Kung Kung attempts to use the phoenix to force human beings to obey him. After the Empress Nü Kua defeated Kung Kung, the phoenix chose to return to his egg and await a time of peace when his power would not be misused and the role of the Guardian is created to protect the phoenix. (pg. 39–40) However, Kung Kung's lieutenant Vatten and the Clan of Nine (named for Vattens form as a nine-headed-serpent) have followed the Chinese Guardians to America and the phoenix will require both Mr. Hu and Tom to protect it. Tom, however, is afraid to truly take on the role of an apprentice Guardian. (pg. 28)

Mr. Hu guides Tom to Goblin Square, a hidden market for the magical inhabitants of San Francisco's Chinatown. Here they meet Mistral, an old friend of Mr. Hu. Mistral is a Chinese Dragon, an exile from her ocean home for speaking out against the Dragon King. (pg. 89–90) Mistral agrees to leave her job as a bodyguard in order to help Mr. Hu protect the phoenix.

The day after they visit Goblin Square another old friend arrives. Sidney, a zealous salesperson in the form of a flying rat, has seen one of Vatten's spies. (pg. 30–32, 68) Mr. Hu leaves Tom to wait for Mistral and protect the phoenix. While Mr. Hu is gone, a silver haired girl, Räv, comes to the door in a fright, looking for sanctuary. Although Mr. Hu has commanded Tom not to open the door, Tom is moved by compassion and lets her in. With the door open, the creature Loo arrives. Another creature from ancient Chinese mythology, Loo is a three-eyed fanged creature with blue skin and red hair. He carries an umbrella that shoots fumes of fatal diseases. (pg. 75–83) Tom is knocked unconscious, and Räv and the phoenix disappear. When Tom wakes he finds another of Mr. Hu's old friends, Monkey. Monkey, who was cursed for challenging Heaven and who stole his magic staff from the Dragon Kingdom, has also come at Mr. Hu's call to protect the phoenix. (pg. 79, 122)

Mr. Hu arrives to find Tom, Mistral, and Monkey amidst the shambles of his shop. Sidney is locked up for a spy and the four leave, Mr. Hu, Monkey and Mistral in their human forms, to find the phoenix.

The spy's trail leads them to a run-down house near the ocean where Tom finds Räv tied up and injured. As they try to rescue Räv, the floor turns into a pack of red-scaled, blue-bristled dogs, Hsieh, which overwhelm the would-be-rescuers. (99–100) Loo arrives and reveals that Räv tricked them. Loo traps them in the shrinking room as it fills with water, leaving Räv and the Hsieh to die with them. Though the tiger's and dragon's strength cannot break the walls, Tom reminds Mr. Hu his grandmother's final lesson, "use your wits, not your claws". (pg. 107) Mr. Hu shrinks everyone trapped and Monkey transforms the hairs of his tail into smaller monkeys which guide everyone out through the source of the water. Räv and the Hsieh are rescued and trapped in a pebble, but not before she reveals that Vatten plans to force the phoenix to hatch early.

Sidney, who has escaped his prison, has found that Vatten has been hiding the phoenix under a hill in the middle of Stow Lake. Though Mr. Hu, Mistral, and Monkey realize that they are too old and will likely not return, they go with Sidney and Tom to find the phoenix. Held up by Loo, Monkey stays behind to fight him while the others proceed to navigate the traps set for them. Mistral is forced to hold back the fanged and clawed tiger-eating unicorn called a Po. (pg. 139) Tom, now determined to live up to his grandmother's legacy, deliberately springs a trap so Mr. Hu can retrieve the phoenix. Tom is caught in the hair of the venomous, many-headed creature called The Watcher. (pg. 140) Even as a ferocious tiger, Mr. Hu cannot stop them. In a last ditch attempt Mr. Hu and Sidney free Tom by setting the Watcher on fire, but they are too late.

Mr. Hu refuses to give up Tom to death, instead bringing everyone to the magical realm of the Empress. The Empress gives some of Mr. Hu's tiger soul to Tom to save him. She also presses a golden scale to Tom's cheek, promising she will come if he calls. (pg. 171) The group returns to the mortal realm with the phoenix, exhausted but successful.

== Characters ==
- Tom Lee: A young Chinese American and apprentice Guardian.
- Mrs. Lee: Guardian and Tom's grandmother.
- Mr. Hu: A Tiger and Guardian
- Mistral: Exiled dragon
- Monkey: Immortal monkey who challenged Heaven and uses a magical staff.
- Räv: Young girl who works for Loo and is betrayed.
- Vatten: Enemy leader who wants the phoenix.
- Empress Nü Kua: Ancient Chinese goddess

== Series ==
The book was followed by two books of the trilogy, Tiger's Blood and Tiger Magic.

== Film adaptation ==
In October 2008, Cartoon Network announced the live-action animated film adaptation of the book with a script by David Magee with Rainmaker Entertainment contracted for the animation. The project was cancelled after Cartoon Network stopped developing live-action projects. In March 2019, Paramount Pictures announced an animated film adaptation, with Carlos Baena as director and Magee and Harry Cripps writing the script. Paramount Animation and Mikros Image Europe are the studios for the film, making it the second collaboration since Sherlock Gnomes. Michelle Yeoh, Sandra Oh, Brandon Soo Hoo, Bowen Yang and Henry Golding were cast in September 2020, with Lucy Liu joining later in July 2022. Raman Hui was hired as the film's director in January 2022, with Paul Watling and Yong Duk Jhun being co-directors and Bob Persichetti joining the film as a producer. Jo Koy, Sherry Cola and Leah Lewis were also added to the cast.

Originally scheduled to be released in February 2022, the film was delayed several times, and its theatrical release was eventually cancelled in September 2023. It was released on Paramount+ on February 2, 2024.
