= Yong Duk Jhun =

South Korean filmmaker (born 1971)

- Born: 1971 (age 54–55); Seoul, South Korea
- Education: School of Visual Arts, University of Seoul
- Occupations: Director, Cinematographer, Animator

Yong Duk Jhun (born 1971) is a South Korean director, cinematographer and animator. He is a director at Paramount Animation and was head of layout at DreamWorks Animation. He is best known for his work on Kung Fu Panda (2008), Shrek Forever After (2010) and Trolls (2016).

== Filmography ==
- Jonah: A VeggieTales Movie (2002) - layout artist
- VeggieTales (2003–2004) - layout artist
- Father of the Pride (2004–2005, 14 episodes) - layout artist
- Over the Hedge (2006) - rough layout artist, animatic
- Kung Fu Panda (2008) - cinematographer, head of layout
- Monsters vs. Aliens (2009) - layout artist
- Shrek Forever After (2010) - cinematographer, head of layout
- The Croods (2013) - cinematographer, head of layout
- Kung Fu Panda 3 (2016) - layout artist
- Trolls (2016) - cinematographer, head of layout
- Ferdinand (2017) - layout adviser
- Spies in Disguise (2019) - layout adviser
- Vivo (2021) - head of cinematography-layout
- Star Trek: Prodigy (2021) - assistant director
- The Tiger's Apprentice (2024) - co-director
