= Atarashii Gakko! =

Japanese girl group formed in 2015

Atarashii Gakko! 新しい学校のリーダーズ
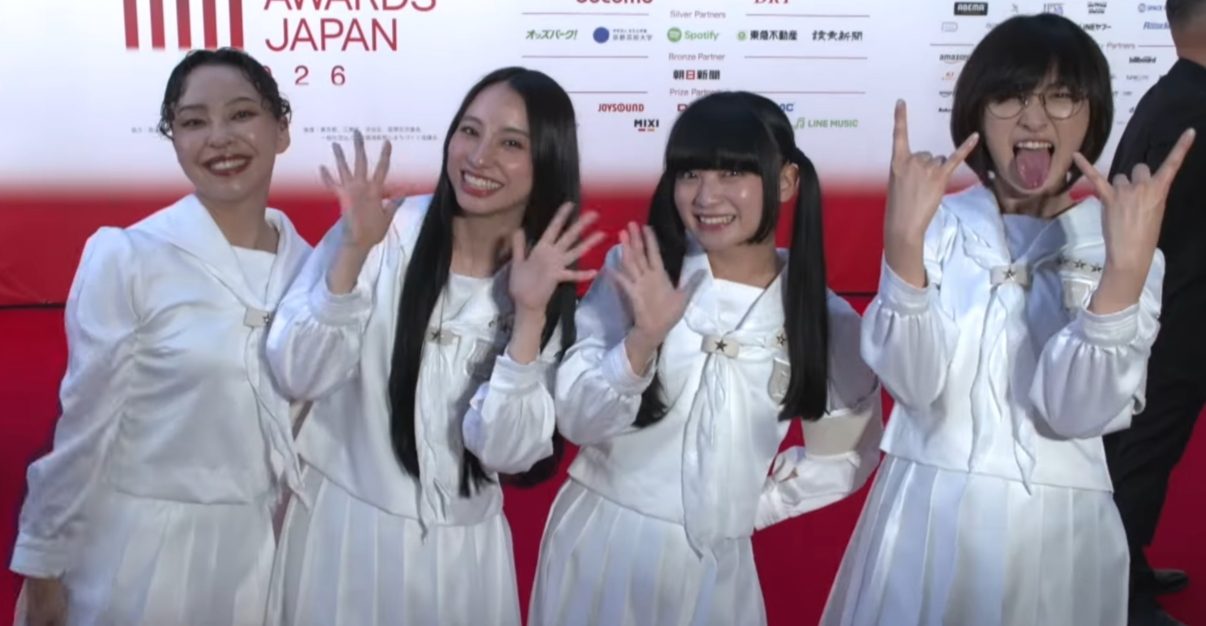
- Atarashii Gakko! in 2026; From left to right: Rin, Kanon, Mizyu, and Suzuka

Background information
- Also known as: Atarashii Gakkou no Leaders
- Origin: Japan
- Genres: J-pop
- Years active: 2015–present
- Labels: Victor Entertainment; 88rising
- Members: Mizyu; Rin; Suzuka; Kanon
- Website: atarashiigakko.com (English); leaders.asobisystem.com (Japanese)

YouTube information
- Channel: ATARASHII GAKKO! - 新しい学校のリーダーズ
- Years active: 2015—present
- Genre: Music
- Subscribers: 1,750,000
- Views: 608 million
- Last updated: July 30, 2026

Atarashii Gakko!, known in Japan as Atarashii Gakkou no Leaders (新しい学校のリーダーズ, lit. 'Leaders of the New School'), is a Japanese girl group formed in 2015. The group is jointly managed with Asobisystem, Twin Planet and TV Asahi Music. They made their Japanese debut in June 2017 under Victor Entertainment with the single "Dokubana", and their worldwide debut in January 2021 under 88rising with the single "Nainainai".

On December 7, 2023, Atarashii Gakko! made their U.S. television debut, performing "Tokyo Calling" on Jimmy Kimmel Live!. After a successful North America tour in 2024, they were part of the matsuri ’25: Japanese Music Experience Los Angeles lineup together with Ado and Yoasobi.

On January 9, 2024, Atarashii Gakko! performed their first show at the Nippon Budokan, called "Seishun Shurai" ("Invasion of Youth").

== Overview ==
=== Concept and formation ===
Atarashii Gakko! adopts a philosophy of challenging the norms of Japanese society. Positioning themselves as the representatives of Japanese youth, the group’s guiding principle states: "In a time when only exemplary citizens are acknowledged, we strive to defy a narrow-minded society by embracing individuality and freedom." While the circumstances surrounding the group’s formation have never been disclosed, they stated on the radio program All Night Nippon that they had met in a supermarket discount aisle.

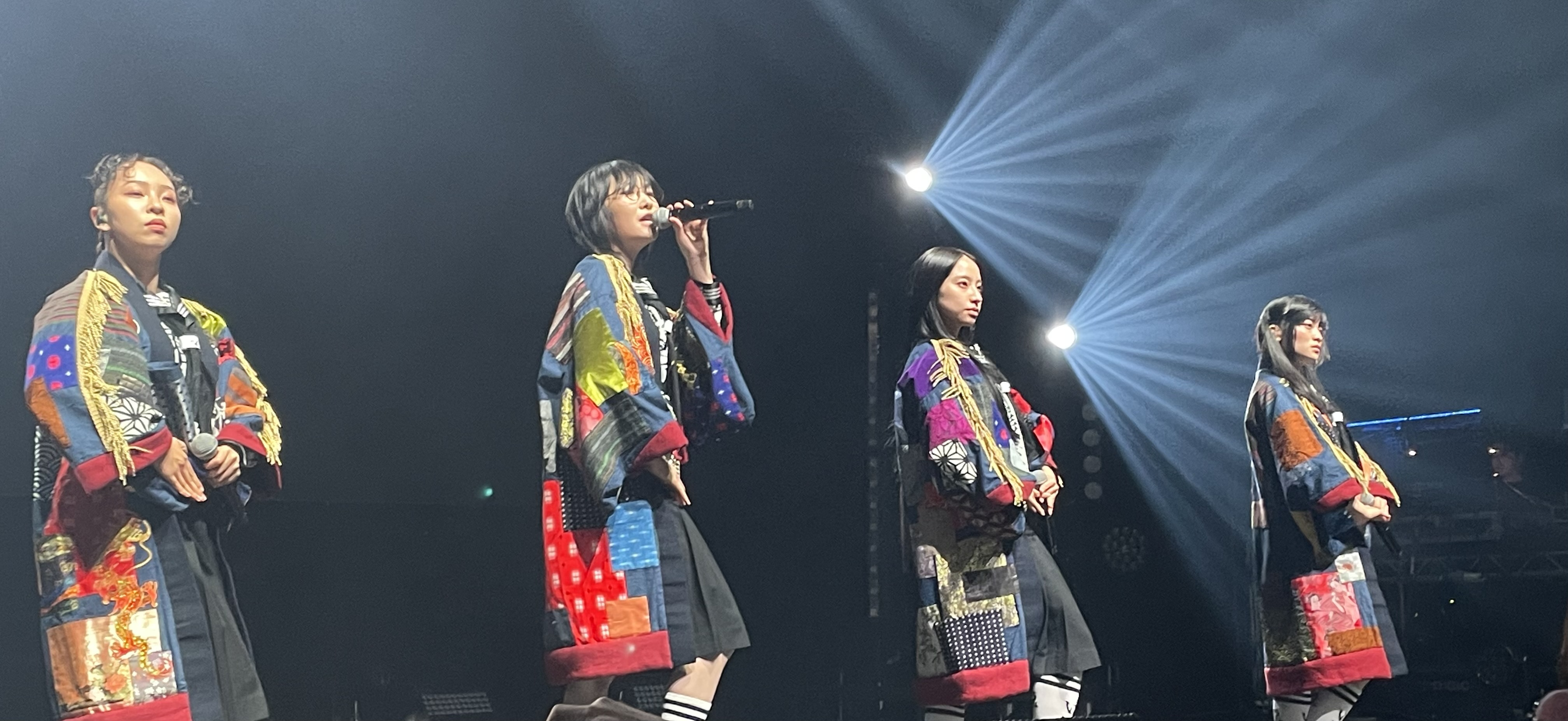
Atarashii Gakko! performing in London in June 2024

In 2020, Atarashi Gakko signed to 88rising, which promotes the group internationally. In 2021, they worked on new songs in Los Angeles with producer Money Mark, several of which were on their EP Snacktime, which released that same year.

== Members ==
Name	Birth date (age)	Birthplace
Mizyu (みぢゅ)	December 22, 1998 (age 27)	Tokyo
Rin (りん)	September 11, 2001 (age 24)	Saitama
Suzuka (すずか)	November 29, 2001 (age 24)	Osaka
Kanon (かのん)	January 18, 2002 (age 24)	Gunma

== Discography ==
=== Singles ===
#	Title	Release date	Oricon peak position	Albums
1	Gakkou Ikeya (学校行けやあ゛)	May 13, 2017	—N/a	新しい学校のすゝめ
2	Dokubana (毒花)	June 7, 2017	84	Maenarawanai
3	Kimiwaina'17 (キミワイナ'17)	October 25, 2017	190	Maenarawanai
4	Koi no Shadanki feat.H Zettrio (恋の遮断機 feat.H ZETTRIO)	January 23, 2018	—N/a	Maenarawanai
5	Saishujinrui (最終人類)	February 28, 2018	—N/a	Maenarawanai
6	Ookami no Uta (狼の詩)	August 29, 2018	142	Wakage Ga Itaru
7	Mayoeba Totoshi (迷えば尊し)	December 12, 2018	—N/a	Wakage Ga Itaru
8	Koi Geba (恋ゲバ)	February 6, 2019	—N/a	Wakage Ga Itaru
9	Otonablue (オトナブルー)	April 30, 2020	—N/a	Ichijikikoku
10	Que Sera Sera (ケセラセラ)	May 15, 2020	—N/a	Maningen
11	Koibumi (恋文)	May 22, 2020	—N/a	Maningen
12	Nainainai	January 20, 2021	—N/a	新しい学校のすゝめ
13	Freaks (with Warren Hue)	March 2, 2021	—N/a	Non-album single
14	Pineapple Kryptonite	September 21, 2021	—N/a	Snacktime
15	Woo! Go!	April 15, 2022	—N/a	Non-album single
16	Baby [Amazon Original] (with Seiho)	July 27, 2022	—N/a	Amazon Music exclusive, non-album single
17	Hanako	October 31, 2022	—N/a	Non-album single
18	The Edge	February 24, 2023	—N/a	Non-album single
19	Janaindayo (じゃないんだよ)	March 22, 2023	—N/a	Ichijikikoku
20	Maningen (マ人間)	August 9, 2023	—N/a	Maningen
21	Tokyo Calling	October 20, 2023	—N/a	AG! Calling
22	Toryanse (とおりゃんせ)	January 26, 2024	—N/a	AG! Calling
23	Hello	February 9, 2024	—N/a	The Tiger's Apprentice (Music from and Inspired by the Motion Picture)
24	Ghostbusters: Frozen Summer	March 6, 2024	—N/a	Song for Ghostbusters: Frozen Empire
25	Change	July 19, 2024	—N/a	新しい学校のすゝめ
26	One Heart	March 13, 2025	—N/a	新しい学校のすゝめ
27	Go Wild	December 5, 2025	—N/a	double A-side
28	Miyao	December 5, 2025	—N/a	double A-side
29	Sailor, Sail On	December 19, 2025	—N/a	Non-album single
30	Chanka Chanka	May 8, 2026	—N/a	From Tokyo with Love
30	Oi, AG!	July 10, 2026	—N/a	From Tokyo with Love
31	TTTTOKYO	August 16, 2026		From Tokyo with Love

=== Albums ===
#	Title	Release date	Oricon peak position
1	Maenarawanai (マエナラワナイ)	March 20, 2018	187
2	Wakage Ga Itaru (若気ガイタル)	March 6, 2019	140
3	AG! Calling	June 7, 2024	—N/a
4	Atarashii Gakko no Susume (新しい学校のすゝめ)	July 16, 2025	9
5	From Tokyo with Love	July 24, 2026	—N/a

=== Extended plays ===
#	Title	Release date	Oricon peak position
1	Snacktime	November 12, 2021	—N/a
2	Ichijikikoku (一時帰国)	April 12, 2023	3
3	Maningen (マ人間)	August 16, 2023	7

=== Music videos ===
Year	Title	Artist	Director	Notes
2015	Kamu to Funyan tofubeats Remix (噛むとフニャン tofubeats Remix)	Atarashii Gakko!		360° music video Collaboration with Fit's and Tofubeats
2016	Gakkou Ikeya (学校行けやあ゛)	Atarashii Gakko!	Yukihiro Morigaki	CM song for Koikeya
2017	Dokubana (毒花)	Atarashii Gakko!	Masatoshi Takizawa	
2017	Kimiwaina'17 (キミワイナ'17)	Atarashii Gakko!	Masatoshi Takizawa	
2018	Koi no Shadanki feat.H Zettrio (恋の遮断機 feat.H ZETTRIO)	Atarashii Gakko! and H Zettrio	Masatoshi Takizawa	
2018	Saishujinrui (最終人類)	Atarashii Gakko!	Masatoshi Takizawa	
2018	Ookami no Uta (狼の詩)	Atarashii Gakko! and H Zettrio	2Boy and Ryo Ichikawa	
2018	Shoujo Gannen (少女元年)	Urbangarde and Atarashii Gakko!	Shun Murakami	
2018	Piroti (ピロティ)	Atarashii Gakko!		
2019	Mayoeba Totoshi (迷えば尊し)	Atarashii Gakko!	Masatoshi Takizawa	
2019	Koi Geba (恋ゲバ)	Atarashii Gakko!	Masatoshi Takizawa	
2019	Masage Cannavaro (まさ毛カンナヴァーロ)	Atarashii Gakko!		
2019	Donimo Tomaranai (どうにもとまらない)	Klang Ruler and Atarashii Gakko!		Linda Yamamoto cover
2019	Waratteyurushite (笑って許して)	Klang Ruler and Atarashii Gakko!		Akiko Wada cover
2021	Nainainai	Atarashii Gakko!	Pennacky	
2021	Freaks	Atarashii Gakko! and Warren Hue	Nasty Men$ah	
2021	Night Before the Exam	Atarashii Gakko!		Live Single Take Performance
2021	Pineapple Kryptonite	Atarashii Gakko!	Philip Atwell	
2021	Intergalactic	Atarashii Gakko!	Sayaka Nakane	Beastie Boys cover
2021	Free Your Mind	Atarashii Gakko!	Sayaka Nakane	
2022	Woo! Go!	Atarashii Gakko!	Mackenzie Sheppard	Collaboration with Nike Japan
2022	Baby [Amazon Original	Seiho and Atarashii Gakko!	Ran Tondabayashi	
2022	Hanako	Atarashii Gakko!	Sayaka Nakane	https://www.youtube.com/watch?v=d3v0QqZlCes
2023	The Edge	Atarashii Gakko!	Fantasista Utamaro	
2023	Otonablue (オトナブルー)	Atarashii Gakko!	Eri Yoshikawa	
2023	Janaindayo (じゃないんだよ)	Atarashii Gakko!	Sayaka Nakane	
2023	Suki Lie	Atarashii Gakko!	Eri Yoshikawa	
2023	Seishun Wo Kirisaku Hado (青春を切り裂く波動)	Atarashii Gakko!	Sayaka Nakane	
2023	Maningen (マ人間)	Atarashii Gakko!	Eri Yoshikawa	
2023	Pineapple Kryptonite (Yohji Igarashi Remix)	Yohji Igarashi Remix (Atarashii Gakko!)	Timothée Lambrecq	
2023	Otonablue (First Take)	Atarashii Gakko!	Keisuke Shimizu	
2023	Tokyo Calling	Atarashii Gakko!	Pennacky	
2024	Toryanse (とおりゃんせ)	Atarashii Gakko!	Mess	
2024	Ghostbusters: Frozen Summer	Atarashii Gakko!	Zumi	Song for Ghostbusters: Frozen Empire
2024	FRDP (ドラ1独走)	Sheena Ringo and Atarashii Gakko!		
2024	Giri Giri	Atarashii Gakko!		Special Choreography Video
2024	Fly High	Atarashii Gakko!	Yuichiro Saeki	
2024	Change	Atarashii Gakko!	O	
2024	Omakase	Atarashii Gakko!	Hiroki Sugiyama	
2024	Shimi (シミ)	Maximum the Hormone feat. Atarashii Gakko!	Yasuhiro Arafune	
2025	One Heart	Atarashii Gakko!	G2 Yuki Tsujimoto	
2026	Oi AG!	Atarashii Gakko!	Mackenzie Sheppard	
2026	TTTTOKYO	Atarashii Gakko!	Mackenzie Sheppard	

== Filmography ==
=== Animation ===
- SNS Police (2018) as anonymous (Rin) in episode 1, Taguchi's mother (Suzuka) in episode 3, Gorgonzola (Mizyu) in episode 5, Puppy (KC) (Kanon) in episode 5, and Gorilla (Rin) in episode 6.

=== Film ===
Year	Title	Role	Notes	Ref(s)
2023	Baby Assassins: 2 Babies	Themselves	Cameo; theme song: "Janaindayo"	

=== Television ===
Year	Title	Role	Notes	Ref(s)
2017	Joshu Seven	Prisoners	Cameo in episode 8	
2018–present	Break!	Themselves		
2018–2019	Kannai Devil	Themselves		
2023–2025	Atarashii Gakkou no Leaders no Kagai Jugyou	Themselves		

=== Web ===
Year	Title	Role	Notes	Ref(s)
2019	Suzuka's Room	Themselves		
2020	Record of New School's Strangeness	Themselves		
2020–2021	Seishun Academy	Themselves		
2021	Japan Youth Trilogy	Themselves		
2022	Music Video VFX Magic With Atarashii Gakko!	Themselves		
2023	Hee! Hee! Hoo!	Themselves	Episode 1	

== Awards and nominations ==
Award Ceremony	Year	Nominee/Work	Category	Result	Ref(s)
Japan Record Awards	2023	Otonablue	Song of the Year	Won	
Berlin Music Video Awards	2024	Tokyo Calling	Best Director	Nominated	
Japan Record Awards	2024	Atarashii Gakko	Special International Music Award	Won	
Golden Melody Awards	2024	Atarashii Gakko	Best Music Video	Nominated	
Music Awards Japan	2025	Atarashii Gakko	Best Japanese Dance Pop Artist	Won	
Music Awards Japan	2025	Otonablue	Best Japanese Dance Pop Song	Nominated	
Music Awards Japan	2025	Otonablue	Best Dance Performance Award	Won	
Golden Melody Award	2025	Atarashii Gakko	Best Vocal Group	Nominated	
ASEA Asia Star Entertainer Awards	2025	Atarashii Gakko	Best Artist Singer	Won	
