= Dragonwings =

1975 novel by Laurence Yep

- Cover of the book's original 1975 edition.
- Author: Laurence Yep
- Language: English
- Genre: Historical fiction, children's literature
- Published: 1975
- Publisher: HarperCollins; 25th edition (January 23, 2001)
- Publication place: United States
- ISBN: 978-0064400855

Dragonwings is a children's historical novel by Laurence Yep, published by Harper & Row in 1975. It inaugurated the Golden Mountain Chronicles and is the fifth chronicle in narrative sequence among ten published as of 2012. The book is used in school classrooms and has been adapted as a play under its original title. Yep and Dragonwings won the Phoenix Award from the Children's Literature Association in 1995, recognizing the best children's book published twenty years earlier that did not win a major award. It had been a runner-up for the annual Newbery Medal.

== Synopsis ==
Dragonwings features the Chinese American experience in the United States, specifically San Francisco, shortly after the turn of the twentieth century.

Moon Shadow Lee (or in the Chinese order, Lee Moon Shadow) grows up in China, having never seen his father, who had traveled to the "Land of the Golden Mountain" in America and worked hard in a family laundry which served the "white demons" (Americans). When Moon Shadow is nine (eight in American calculation), a distant relative, Hand Clap, returns to China for a visit. Hand Clap offers to take Moon Shadow to the Golden Mountain. While Moon Shadow's mother is hesitant to let him go, she eventually agrees.

Moon Shadow soon meets his father, Wind Rider, and receives a few wonderful gifts from his father, uncle, and new friend. From his uncle, he receives a pair of new black leather boots, and from his new friend, he is given some trousers and a shirt. Finally, he gifted a beautiful kite from his father, for whom kite making is a specialty. Moon Shadow discovers that Wind Rider had a dream of a great dragon king. In his dream, Wind Rider learned he was a dragon in his former life and is determined to be worthy enough to again become a dragon. Moon Shadow supports and encourages Wind Rider, even as they suffer hardships like the Great Earthquake, poverty, and the gap between the Tang (Chinese) and white demons (Americans). Moon Shadow goes through difficult situations with his family and has to find his place in life.

Part of the story is based on an actual event that took place in 1909 involving a young Chinese flier named Fung Joe Guey.

== Awards ==
The CLA Phoenix Award is named for the mythical bird phoenix, which is reborn from its ashes, to suggest the winning book's rise from obscurity during twenty years since its publication. Dragonwings was not unrecognized in 1975. It was a runner-up (Honor Book) for both the American Library Association Newbery Medal, recognizing the year's best U.S. children's book, and the Boston Globe–Horn Book Award for children's fiction. It won an International Reading Association Children's Book Award and it made School Library Journal and The New York Times annual booklists.

== Play ==
Dragonwings was adapted as a stage play by the author in 1991, commissioned by Berkeley Repertory Theatre. It premiered as a school tour in the San Francisco Bay Area and was directed by Phyllis S.K. Look. The play was published by Dramatists Play Service in 1993.

== Golden Mountain Chronicles ==
The family saga follows the Young family, initially in China. Dragons of Silk (2011) spans a few generations and brings the story to the present; nine previous novels have been dated 1849 to 1995.

1. The Serpent's Children, set in 1849 (1984)
2. Mountain Light, 1855 (1985)
3. Dragon's Gate, 1867 (1993)
4. The Traitor, 1885 (2003)
5. Dragonwings, 1903 (1975)
6. Dragon Road, 1939 (2007); originally The Red Warrior
7. Child of the Owl, 1960 (1977)
8. Sea Glass, 1970 (1979)
9. Thief of Hearts, 1995 (1995)
10. Dragons of Silk, 1835–2011 (2011)

In order of year of publication:

1. Dragonwings, 1903 (1975)
2. Child of the Owl, 1960 (1977)
3. Sea Glass, 1970 (1979)
4. The Serpent's Children, set in 1849 (1984)
5. Mountain Light, 1855 (1985)
6. Dragon's Gate, 1867 (1993)
7. Thief of Hearts, 1995 (1995)
8. The Traitor, 1885 (2003)
9. Dragon Road, 1939 (2007); originally The Red Warrior
10. Dragons of Silk, 1835–2011 (2011)

Four of the ten historical novels are among Yep's five works most widely held in WorldCat libraries. Dragonwings and Dragon's Gate were runners-up for the Newbery Medal; Child of the Owl won the Horn Book Award.
