= Mikros Animation =

French visual effects and animation company

- Type: Subsidiary
- Industry: Visual effects Animation
- Predecessor: Technicolor Animation Productions; Technicolor Animation
- Founded: 19 November 1985; 40 years ago
- Founder: Maurice Prost
- Headquarters: 8-10 rue du Renard 75004 Paris, France
- Number of locations: 3
- Area served: Worldwide
- Key people: Andrea Miloro (president); Greg Mandel (chief operating officer)
- Number of employees: 170
- Parent: Mediacontech (2007–2015); Technicolor Group (2015–2025); Rodeo FX (2025–present)
- Website: www.mikrosanimation.com

Mikros Animation is a French production company specializing in the creation of digital visual effects, post-production, and animation.

With studios in Paris, London and Montreal, the company was acquired by Technicolor SA in 2015 from its previous owner Mediacontech.

When Technicolor Animation Productions and Technicolor Animation were folded into the company, the company started producing and providing animation services for television shows.

In 2025, Rodeo FX acquired Mikros Animation. The assets acquired by Rodeo FX included its brand and operations in Paris and Montreal but not its TV division and French IPs, and its studios in London, Brussels and Liege. OuiDo! Productions (which was also once previously under Technicolor) acquired the TV IPs and Mikros Animation's TV and IP businesses in France.

== Portfolio ==
=== Mikros Image Montreal and Mikros Animation ===
- Go West! A Lucky Luke Adventure (2007) (post-production)
- Logorama (2009)
- Oggy and the Cockroaches: The Movie (2013) (post-production)
- Mune: Guardian of the Moon (2014)
- The Little Prince (2015)
- Sahara (2017)
- Captain Underpants: The First Epic Movie (2017)
- Stronger (2017; VFX)
- The Big Bad Fox and Other Tales... (2017; VFX)
- Sgt. Stubby: An American Hero (2018)
- The SpongeBob Movie: Sponge on the Run (2020)
- Paw Patrol: The Movie (2021)
- Mickey Mouse Funhouse (2022–2025)
- Teenage Mutant Ninja Turtles: Mutant Mayhem (2023)
- Paw Patrol: The Mighty Movie (2023)
- Thelma the Unicorn (2024)
- Plankton: The Movie (2025)
- Mickey Mouse Clubhouse+ (2025)
- Magicampers (2026)
- Untitled Teenage Mutant Ninja Turtles: Mutant Mayhem sequel (2027)
- Charlie and the Chocolate Factory (TBA)
- Oompa-Loompa TV series (TBA)

=== Mikros Image Europe ===
- The Ninth Gate (1999; VFX)
- The Crimson Rivers (2000; VFX)
- Oceans (2009; VFX)
- Immortals (2011; VFX)
- Wolfy, the Incredible Secret (2013, post-production)
- Asterix: The Mansions of the Gods (2014)
- Valerian and the City of a Thousand Planets (2017; VFX)
- Sherlock Gnomes (2018)
- Asterix: The Secret of the Magic Potion (2018)
- Ozi: Voice of the Forest (2023)
- Teenage Mutant Ninja Turtles: Mutant Mayhem (2023)
- The Tiger's Apprentice (2024)
- Orion and the Dark (2024)
- Bollywoof (2027)
- Untitled Teenage Mutant Ninja Turtles: Mutant Mayhem sequel (2027)
