= Laurence Yep =

American writer (born 1948)

- 叶祥添 / 葉祥添
- Born: June 14, 1948 (age 78); San Francisco, California, US
- Education: B.A., PhD, English literature
- Alma mater: Marquette University; UC-Santa Cruz; SUNY-Buffalo
- Occupation: Writer
- Spouse: Joanne Ryder (m. 1984)
- Writing career
- Genres: Children's literature, historical fiction, speculative fiction, autobiography
- Notable awards: Newbery Honor Book; 1975, 1994; Boston Globe–Horn Book Award; 1977; Phoenix Award; 1995; Children's Literature Legacy Award; 2005

Laurence Michael Yep (simplified Chinese: 叶祥添; traditional Chinese: 葉祥添; pinyin: Yè Xiángtiān; Jyutping: Jip6 Coeng4 Tim1; born June 14, 1948) is an American writer. He is known for his children's books, having won the Newbery Honor twice for his Golden Mountain series. In 2005, he received the Children's Literature Legacy Award for his career contribution to American children's literature.

== Life, education, and career ==
Yep was born in San Francisco, California, in Chinatown to Thomas (Gim Lew) Yep and Franche Lee Yep. His father was a first-generation American born in China who had moved to San Francisco as a boy. His mother was a second-generation Chinese American, was born in Ohio and raised in West Virginia where her family ran a Chinese laundry. After struggling through the Great Depression, Yep's family moved to a multicultural but predominantly African-American neighborhood. Yep grew up working in the family grocery store, where he recalls learning early on "how to observe and listen to people, how to relate to others. It was good training for a writer."

Yep was named by his older brother Thomas, who had just been studying the biography of Saint Lawrence for school. He spent his early childhood commuting from his neighborhood to a Catholic school in Chinatown for Chinese children, where he was often made fun of by the mostly bilingual students for only knowing how to speak English.

Not until high school when Yep attended a less segregated Catholic school did he confront white American culture in person, having grown up among Black and Chinese kids. Although he had always been interested in science, at St. Ignatius College Preparatory, he also became interested in literature and creative writing. Yep published his first story in a science fiction magazine at the age of 18 while still in high school. His English teacher, a Jesuit priest, motivated him to submit his story to magazines until it got published if he wanted to get an A grade. This experience inspired Yep to first consider what a career in writing might be like, even though he had always been fascinated with machines and wanted to become a chemist.

Yep graduated from St. Ignatius College Preparatory in 1966.

His decision to become a writer did not come until he entered college at Marquette University. There he became friends with a literary magazine editor, Joanne Ryder, whom he eventually married. She introduced him to children's literature and later encouraged him to write a book for children while she was working at Harper & Row. The result was his first science fiction novel for teens entitled Sweetwater, published by Harper & Row in 1973. After two years at Marquette, Yep transferred to UC Santa Cruz where he earned a BA in 1970. He later earned a PhD in English at the State University of New York at Buffalo.

== Writing career ==
Growing up, Yep often felt torn between mainstream American culture and his Chinese roots, a theme he has often written about. A great deal of his work involves characters feeling alienated or not fitting into their environment, something Yep has said he struggled with since childhood: "I was too American to fit into Chinatown, and too Chinese to fit in anywhere else."

During his writing career, Yep also taught creative writing and Asian-American studies at the University of California, Berkeley and UC Santa Barbara.

Yep's most notable collection of works is the Golden Mountain Chronicles, documenting the fictional Young family from 1849 in China to 1995 in America. Two of the series are Newbery Honor Books, or runners-up for the annual Newbery Medal: Dragonwings (Harper & Row, 1975) and Dragon's Gate (HarperCollins, 1993). Dragonwings won the Phoenix Award from the Children's Literature Association in 1995, recognizing the best children's book published twenty years earlier that did not win a major award. It won the Carter G. Woodson Book Award in 1976, and has been adapted as a play under its original title. Another of the Chronicles, Child of the Owl won the Boston Globe-Horn Book Award for children's fiction in 1977. (The Rainbow People, Yep's collection of short stories based on Chinese folktales and legends, was a Horn Book runner-up in 1989.)

Yep wrote two other notable series, Chinatown Mysteries and Dragon (1982 to 1992). The latter is an adaptation of Chinese mythology as four fantasy novels.

In 2005 the professional children's librarians awarded Yep the Children's Literature Legacy Award, which recognizes an author or illustrator whose books, published in the United States, have made "a substantial and lasting contribution to literature for children". The committee noted that "Yep explores the dilemma of the cultural outsider" with "attention to the complexity and conflict within and across cultures" and it cited four works in particular: Dragonwings, The Rainbow People, The Khan's Daughter, and the autobiographical The Lost Garden.

A live-action/CGI TV movie of The Tiger's Apprentice, adapted by David Magee, was being developed by Cartoon Network until it was cancelled after Cartoon Network stopped developing live-action projects. In March 2019, Paramount Pictures announced an animated film adaptation of the book with a script by Magee and a release date of February 2, 2024.

January 27, 2024 was Tiger's Apprentice world premiere in Los Angeles. Paramount Plus released Tiger's Apprentice on its streaming platform February 2, 2024.

== Personal life ==
Yep married the writer Joanne Ryder in 1984. They live in Monterey County .

== Works ==
Golden Mountain Chronicles

As of 2011 there are ten published chronicles spanning 1835 to the present. Here they are ordered by the fictional history and the year of the narrative follows the title; none of the titles includes a date.

1. The Serpent's Children, set in 1849 (1984)
2. Mountain Light, 1855 (1985)
3. Dragon's Gate, 1867 (1993)
4. The Traitor, 1885 (2003)
5. Dragonwings, 1903 (1975)
6. Dragon Road, 1939 (2007); originally The Red Warrior
7. Child of the Owl, 1960 (1977)
8. Sea Glass, 1970 (1979)
9. Thief of Hearts, 1995 (1995)
10. Dragons of Silk, 1835–2011 (2011)

Dragon (fantasy series)

1. Dragon of the Lost Sea
2. Dragon Steel
3. Dragon Cauldron
4. Dragon War

Star Fisher series

1. The Star Fisher
2. Dream Soul (sequel to The Star Fisher)

Chinatown Mysteries

1. The Case of the Goblin Pearls
2. The Case of the Lion Dance
3. The Case of the Firecrackers

City trilogy

1. City of Fire
2. City of Ice
3. City of Death

The Tiger's Apprentice

1. The Tiger's Apprentice: Book One
2. Tiger's Blood: Book Two
3. Tiger Magic: Book Three

Ribbons (untitled group of books)

1. Ribbons
2. The Cook's Family (sequel to Ribbons)
3. The Amah (companion novel)
4. Angelfish (sequel to The Cook's Family)

Later, Gator (untitled group of books)

1. Later, Gator
2. Cockroach Cooties
3. Skunk Scout

Mia St. Clair (American Girl series)

1. Mia
2. Bravo, Mia!

Isabelle series

1. Isabelle
2. Designs by Isabelle
3. To the Stars, Isabelle

A Dragon's Guide series (co-authored with Joanne Ryder, illustrated by Mary GrandPre)

1. A Dragon's Guide to the Care and Feeding of Humans
2. A Dragon's Guide to Making Your Human Smarter
3. A Dragon's Guide to Making Perfect Wishes

Nonfiction

1. American Dragons: Twenty-five Asian American Voices (editor)
2. The Lost Garden (autobiography, part of the In my own Words series)

Picture books

1. The Magic Paintbrush
2. The Dragon Prince: A Chinese Beauty and the Beast Tale
3. The Butterfly Boy
4. The Shell Woman and the King: a Chinese folktale
5. The Khan's Daughter: a Mongolian folktale
6. The Ghost Fox
7. The Boy Who Swallowed Snakes
8. The Man who Tricked a Ghost
9. The City of Dragons

Other books

1. Seademons
2. Tongues of Jade
3. The Rainbow People
4. Sweetwater
5. Hiroshima: A Novella
6. The Earth Dragon Awakes: the San Francisco Earthquake of 1906
7. Lady of Ch'iao Kuo: Warrior of the South (part of The Royal Diaries series)
8. The Journal of Wong Ming-Chung: A Chinese Miner (part of the My Name Is America series)
9. Spring Pearl: The Last Flower (part of the Girls of Many Lands series)
10. The Imp that Ate My Homework
11. When the Circus Came to Town
12. Kind Hearts and Gentle Monsters
13. The Mark Twain Murders
14. The Tom Sawyer Fires
15. Shadow Lord (a Star Trek novel)
16. Monster Makers, Inc.

Plays

1. The Age of Wonders
2. Dragonwings
3. Pay the Chinaman (one-act)
4. Fairy Bones (one-act)
5. HI
