= Dragon (fantasy series) =

Novel series by Laurence Yep

Dragon series
- Author: Laurence Yep
- Language: English
- Genre: Fantasy
- Publisher: Harper & Row, HarperCollins
- Publication date: January 1982 – May 1992
- Publication place: United States
- Media type: Print (hardback, paperback and library binding)
- Pages: 211 (in total)

The Dragon series is a tetralogy of fantasy novels by American author Laurence Yep. Yep had already written several books including the Newbery Honor novel Dragonwings by 1980, when, after undertaking careful research, he decided to adapt Chinese mythology into a fantasy form, something he had always wanted to do since he had sold his first science fiction story at 18. He "tried to stay true to the spirit" of these myths, but did not try "to keep their exact details". The "perfect vehicle" he chose was a folktale in which the Monkey King captured a river spirit who had flooded an entire city, which he at first tried to conceive in picture book form. However, he kept questioning the motivations of the river spirit, whom he had renamed Civet. This resulted in the realization, as his outline ballooned exponentially from eight to 800 pages, that he would need a series as opposed to just one book to tell her story.

The story then evolved into one in which the Monkey King pursued Civet into "our reality", resulting in "several normal children from our universe" being taken back into theirs. Yep had completed several drafts of this version when "toward the end of that version there was a special pair - a dragon and her boy - who stole the scene whenever they were on stage". He realized that he had to nearly start over, this time structuring the story around these two, who became Shimmer and Thorn. This proved to be just the start, as Yep continued to incorporate more material and mythology into the later books based on further research and inspiration. Part of the process involved changing the narration from Shimmer to the Monkey King with the third book, Dragon Cauldron. Yep has said of Shimmer that he had "never written about a character quite so independent, even demanding".

Yep wrote the series over a twelve-year period. It is likely that he wrote each book at the same time he was writing others including his autobiography, as he frequently writes several books simultaneously, but in different genres as he often gets writer's block. Dragon of the Lost Sea for example, was written at the same time that he wrote The Mark Twain Murders. During this time, Yep's being able to settle into his characters such as Shimmer, who has been described as "opinionated, arrogant, and has a quick temper that sometimes makes it very difficult to be her friend", created some strain with his wife, fellow author Joanne Ryder, as at times the "dragon" in him would emerge.

== Synopsis ==
The tetralogy reads in sequence, with each successive book picking where the previous one left off. Dragon of the Lost Sea begins with the dragon princess Shimmer, who had been wandering for hundreds of years in exile after stealing the dream pearl, a treasure with the power to cast illusions and change its user's form, which her mother had willed to her but her brother Pomfret had tried to claim. After picking up the trail of Civet, the witch who had sealed the Inland Sea in a pebble, she encounters the orphaned young kitchen servant Thorn, who amazes her with his kindness and who she eventually saves from an assassination attempt by Civet. Thorn joins Shimmer on her quest, which eventually leads to the city of River Glen where they encounter the powerful mage known as Monkey. Monkey fails to capture Civet after she destroys the pebble and floods River Glen. Shimmer and Thorn track Civet to her lair, where after some trickery on Thorn's part, they manage to capture Civet. Shimmer decides to spare Civet after hearing her story and understanding her, and she and Thorn acknowledge their partnership.

Dragon Steel continues with Shimmer transporting Thorn and the captured Civet to the ocean domains of her uncle Sambar XII. She finds that the Inland Sea dragons who had sought refuge with him have been forced to work under difficult conditions, and she and Thorn get thrown into the dungeons after Thorn tries to prevent Shimmer from handing over an illusionary dream pearl. They are reunited with Monkey, who was captured trying to steal the magical Baldy's cauldron to boil away the Inland Sea. Assisted by a young kitchen servant named Indigo who is from a nearby forest called the Green Darkness, Shimmer and Thorn escape, taking Indigo with them. They manage to make their way to where the Inland Sea dragons now reside, forging dragon steel and garrisoning frontier outposts. Shimmer is able to convince her fellow dragons to relinquish the last strands of a flower that once grew abundantly by the Inland Sea for Monkey to summon the Lord of the Flowers, a powerful ancient being. They nearly fail in getting him the flower, but his summons is successful. The Lord of the Flowers helps Monkey escape and gives them access to Sambar's vault, where they find Baldy's cauldron, which gets cracked during the ensuing fight. Monkey's powerful weapon, his magical size-changing rod, and Civet are also retrieved. On Indigo's request they are transported to the Green Darkness, but find it devastated by the tyrannical human king known as the Butcher. Indigo decides to go with Shimmer and Thorn, along with a repentant Civet.

Dragon Cauldron begins with Shimmer and her companions having to flee the Green Darkness from the Butcher's soldiers. Camping by a lake, Civet is drawn to a mysterious door on the lake bed as all her magic has been used up, and becomes possessed by an ancient spirit. She is rescued, but not before prophesizing certain events. The group then journeys into the Desolate Mountains in search of the Smith and the Snail Woman, the only two beings capable of restoring the cauldron. There, they are attacked by the Butcher's soldiers and end up falling into a river, winding up at a small, remote island with a magical barrier in place. It takes some time before Thorn is able to figure out a means of escape. Although successful, he also unwittingly helps set free the Nameless One, a powerful ancient king and wizard who could not be killed and was stripped of his powers and imprisoned on the island. The Nameless One adopts the name of the Boneless King and succeeds in possessing the body of the Butcher, who it turns out had been conducting an excavation on the Nameless One's tomb nearby. Civet sacrifices herself to help Shimmer and her companions escape, shortly after which they encounter the Smith and the Snail Woman. After the previously imprisoned soul within it escapes, Thorn decides to place his soul into that of the cauldron to replace it. Shimmer, Monkey and Indigo return to River Glen with the cauldron/Thorn to boil away the Inland Sea, but are captured by the Boneless King with the aid of Shimmer's brother Pomfret, who has allied with the Butcher.

Dragon War sees the successful escape of Monkey, Shimmer and Indigo and their attempts to rescue Thorn. They also attempt to stop the Boneless King, who has launched a war against the dragons armed with the cauldron and an ancient substance called living fire which can burn in water. They make two rescue attempts which end in failure and near death, but escape each time. Eventually reunited with her fellow Inland Sea dragons, Shimmer is able to ally and get aid from her uncle Sambar, who faces imminent defeat from the Boneless King as well as a kraken invasion. Shimmer uses the dream pearl to cast a massive illusion of the dragon army, distracting the Boneless King while Monkey steals back the cauldron and the Inland Sea dragons sink the fleet of warships and infiltrate the human forts to dispose of the living fire. As the dragons win a victory over the Boneless King's forces, Pomfret steals the cauldron back using deception and is chased by Shimmer, Indigo and Monkey to the capital, which has risen in revolt. In the palace, they confront the Boneless King one last time, who tries to cast them into the void that is before time to permanently be rid of them. However Pomfret has a change of heart after realizing the magnitude of his actions and throws himself and the Boneless King into the summoned portal. With the threat now gone, Thorn is revealed to be the missing crown prince. The Inland Sea is boiled away from River Glen and restored. With the aid of Monkey's master the Old Boy, who had left an infant Thorn with his innkeeper master years ago, the Smith and Snail Woman are able to restore Thorn to human form, although he remains part-cauldron. Indigo decides to join the Inland Sea dragons, becoming permanently turned into one, while Shimmer assumes the leadership of her people.

== Characters ==
=== Protagonists ===
Indigo
Indigo is a young teenage girl around the same age as Thorn. Originally of the Kingfisher Clan who inhabited an ancient coastal forest known as the Green Darkness, her parents led the clan but were forced to flee after opposing the Butcher and were granted asylum by the dragons. After they died, Indigo was left to work within the palace of Shimmer's uncle, the High King of the Dragons, Sambar XII, as a kitchen servant in the dungeons. She did not have any friends and was mistreated by the other kitchen servants. Indigo's most distinguishing feature is her hairstyle, which is fashioned into blue spikes. Indigo helps Thorn and Shimmer escape and accompanies them in an attempt to return to her homeland. However she discovers that it was not what she expected, having lived most of her life underwater and finding little to go back to after the Butcher conscripted the people and deforested the land, so she joins Shimmer on her quest. The developing relationship between her and Shimmer puts a strain on that between the latter and Thorn, who perceives that Shimmer has come to favor Indigo over him.

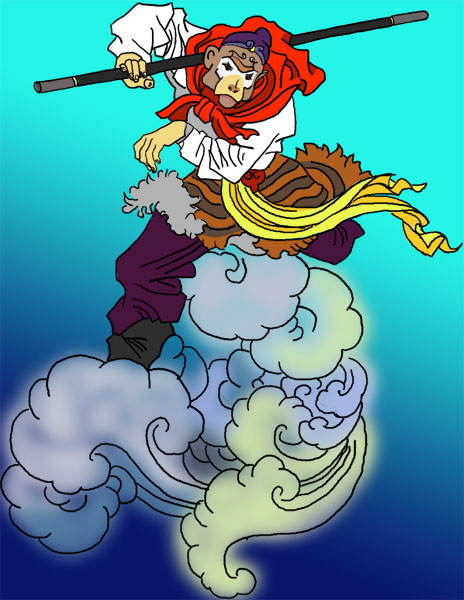
The Monkey King

Monkey
Monkey is a mage and former troublemaker who now serves a wizard known as the Old Boy, who controls him via a circlet that he was able to place around Monkey's head that causes him great pain when he disobeys. However he still retains much of his original mischievous nature. Monkey's weapon is an iron rod with a loop on each end that he can manipulate in size to be as long as he wants, or shrink to the size of a needle normally kept tucked behind an ear. He has the power of transformation and can fly via magic, although he tends to somersault in the air. Monkey can create as many clones of himself as there are hairs on his tail to do his bidding, while a single hair can also be transformed into an unbreakable chain on command. Monkey is a minor character in the first two books, but plays a larger role in the last two, in which he is also the narrator. He is based on the Monkey King.

Shimmer
Shimmer is a dragon princess of the Inland Sea who has been in exile since she fled with the dream pearl after her mother had promised it to her and her brother Pomfret tried to claim it. The dream pearl is a treasure which is capable of creating illusions and changing the forms of its targets, which Shimmer normally keeps under a fold of flesh on her forehead. Shimmer's ability to use it is her greatest skill, although she is also a talented flyer and fighter. She wandered in human form for centuries before encountering Thorn and attempting to restore her homeland after its waters were sealed into a pebble by Civet. She is the narrator of the first two books.

Thorn
Thorn is a young, orphaned teenage boy of thirteen who was a kitchen servant at an inn in the small village of Amity. He was left there years ago as a baby by Monkey's wizard master the Old Boy with the innkeeper. Although friendless and mistreated, Thorn has a generous and courageous nature. He was rescued from being killed by one of Civet's servants by Shimmer and joined her on her quest to restore the Lost Sea. Although completely outmatched by many of the opponents that they face, he never ceases to amaze Shimmer with his bravery, and becomes a steadfast, loyal, and resourceful ally.

=== Supporting characters ===
The Butcher
The Butcher was a general under the former king who usurped the throne twelve years ago after the king was killed fighting nomadic invaders and the queen and baby crown prince disappeared. His nickname comes from having been previously apprenticed to a meat seller, but he has lived up to it "by the ruthless slaughter of friends and foes alike". Feared by even his own guards, he personally tortures captives when the mood suits him. The Butcher undertook long and careful preparations for his war with the dragons, such as constructing a fleet of warships using trees from the Green Darkness' and conscripting the members of the Kingfisher clan to serve as a labor force. He also carried out an excavation and investigation of the Nameless One's tomb on Egg Mountain in search of "living fire", an ancient flammable substance which can burn in water and cannot be extinguished until it burns itself out to be used as a secret weapon.

Civet
Civet is a witch who sealed the waters of the Inland Sea into a blue pebble centuries ago, causing it to now be known as the Lost Sea. Originally from the city of River Glen, she is more than a thousand years old, but physically appears as "a small, dainty girl of about sixteen", having been preserved as she was when she drowned by her husband, the King Within the River, from whom it took her a thousand years to learn magic from before she could escape. She is the primary antagonist of Dragon of the Lost Sea, but joins forces with Shimmer in Dragon Steel. She is named after the civet and is based on the Old Mother of the Waters myth.

The Nameless One/The Boneless King
The Nameless One was a once-powerful king and wizard who battled the Five Masters so long ago that his name is now largely forgotten. He destroyed vast swathes of land that never recovered. Defeated, he could not be killed, so he was disembodied and turned into a living patch of human skin. Left on a small, remote island in an underground river flowing near Egg Mountain with a magical barrier erected to prevent his escape, his sole companion was a large, white dog named Snowgoose. After the protagonists and Civet land on his island, they unwittingly help him escape. He adopts the name of the Boneless King and is able to possess the body of the Butcher during the latter's investigation of his tomb on Egg Mountain. The Boneless King is based on a character "who was born from an egg dropped by a snow-white dog".

Pomfret
Pomfret is Shimmer's older brother and the current king of the Inland (Lost) Sea. His claim to the dream pearl which his mother had promised Shimmer led her to take it and flee. After the dragons of the Inland Sea migrated to the ocean ruled by his uncle, High King of the Dragons of Sambar XII, Pomfret played no role in attempting to advocate on behalf of his subjects who were forced to earn their keep in Sambar's dominion by working in dangerous conditions forging dragon steel and serving as outpost guards on the kingdom's periphery against krakens. He eventually left and allied himself with the Butcher, who promised him rule of the ocean in return for his aid in the planned war against the dragons.

== Reception ==
The Dragon series has been well received. It has been described as "a fantasy series starring dragons, magicians, a monkey wizard, and other figures from Chinese folklore, with new adventures and modern dialogue". The relationship between dragon and human in the form of Shimmer and Thorn "reverses the common role of dragons as villains in English and Western European folk literature". However aside from them and Monkey, "each of the other characters are allowed to maintain essentially their own separate individual personality. Consequently, the reader is struck by the freshness and distinctiveness of the various characters".

Because the sequels closely followed each other, the School Library Journal commented in its review of Dragon War that "because it would be hard to follow events and character changes without reading the earlier books, this one is recommended where the others have been enjoyed". Publishers Weekly also stated in its review of Dragon War that "readers new to the series may be confused by the characters' sketchy introductions and the complexity of past events alluded to but never clarified". However, Kirkus Reviews said of Dragon Cauldron that "writing and images here are powerful enough for this to stand on its own; Yep's strong, earthy characters are notable as individuals even when a reader coming into the middle of the sequence doesn't know their history".

Dragon of the Lost Sea was an American Library Association Notable Children's Book of 1982 and was named as one of the 100 Favorite Paperbacks of 1989 by the International Reading Association and Children's Book Council. It also made the William Allen White Children's Book Award Master List for 1984-85. Dragon Steel was listed as one of the Child Study Association of America's Children's Books of the Year for 1986.
