= Cameron (given name) =

- Pronunciation: /ˈkæmərən/ KAM-ər-ən
- Gender: Unisex
- Language: English, Scots

Origin
- Language: Scottish Gaelic
- Origin: Cameron (surname)
- Meaning: "Crooked nose"
- Region of origin: Scotland

Other names
- Variant forms: Camron; Camryn; Cameryn; Kameron; Kamran; Kamron; Kamryn; Camren
- Short forms: Cam, Cammy, Cammie, Ron, Ronnie, Ronny, Caz
- See also: Cameron (surname)

Cameron is a given name in the English language.

The name originates from the Scottish surname Cameron.

A variant spelling of the given name is Camron. Modern variants of the name are Kameron, Kamron and Camryn. A shortened form of the given name Cameron is Cam.

== Men with the given name ==
- Cameron Achord, football coach
- Cameron Alborzian (born 1967), British-Iranian yogi and model
- Cameron M. Alexander (1932–2018), American Baptist church and community leader
- Cameron Allan (1955–2013), Australian-born American composer and record producer
- Cameron Ambridge (born 1978), Australian stuntman
- Cameron Anderson (politician) (1857–1926), Canadian politician
- Cameron Ansell (born 1992), Canadian voice actor
- Cameron Argetsinger (1921–2008), American lawyer and auto racing executive
- Cameron Artigliere (born 1990), German soccer player
- Cameron Artis-Payne (born 1990), football player
- Cameron Ayers (born 1991), American basketball player
- Cameron Baerg (born 1972), Canadian rower
- Cameron Bailey, Canadian film critic and festival programmer
- Cameron Baird (1981–2013), Australian soldier
- Cameron Bairstow (born 1990), Australian basketballer
- Cameron Ball (born 2003), American football player
- Cameron Bancroft (born 1992), Australian cricketer
- Cameron Bancroft (actor) (born 1967), Canadian actor
- Cameron Barr, Australian rules soccer umpire
- Cameron McVicar Batjer (1919–2011), American lawyer
- Cameron Batson (born 1995), football player
- Cameron Bayly (born 1990), Australian cyclist
- Cameron Beaubier (born 1992), American motorcycle racer
- Cameron Beckman (born 1970), American golfer
- Cameron Belford (born 1988), English soccer player
- Cameron Bell (born 1986), Scottish soccer coach and former player
- Cameron Bell (rugby league), New Zealand rugby coach
- Cameron Blades (born 1971), Australian rugby union player
- Cameron Blair (rugby league) (born 1966), Australian rugby league player
- Cameron Boardman (born 1970), Australian politician
- Cameron Bolton (born 1990), Australian snowboarder
- Cameron Boozer (born 2007), American basketball player
- Cameron Borgas (born 1983), Australian cricketer
- Cameron Borthwick-Jackson (born 1997), English soccer player
- Cameron Boyce (1999–2019), American actor
- Cameron Boyce (cricketer) (born 1989), Australian cricketer
- Cameron Boyle, Scottish rugby union player
- Cameron Bradfield (born 1987), football player
- Cameron Brannagan (born 1996), English soccer player
- Cameron Brate (born 1991), football player
- Cameron Brewer (born 1973), New Zealand politician
- Cameron Bright (born 1993), Canadian actor
- Cameron Britton (born 1986), American actor
- Cameron Brown (disambiguation), multiple people
- Cameron Bruce (born 1979), Australian Rules soccer player
- Cameron Bryce (born 1995), Scottish curler
- Cameron Buchanan (disambiguation), multiple people
- Cameron Burgess (born 1995), Australian soccer player
- Cameron Burrell (1994–2021), American sprinter
- Cameron Cairnes, Australian film director and writer
- Cameron Calhoun (born 2004), football player
- Cameron "Cam" Cannarella (born 2003), American baseball player
- Cameron Carpenter (born 1981), American organist
- Cameron Carr (disambiguation), multiple people
- Cameron Carter-Vickers (born 1997), footballer
- Cameron Cartio (born 1978), Swedish singer of Persian origin
- Cameron Chalmers (born 1997), British sprinter
- Cameron Champ (born 1995), American golfer
- Cameron Chism (born 1990), football player
- Cameron Ciraldo (born 1984), Australian rugby league coach
- Cameron Clapp (born 1986), American athlete
- Cameron Clark (disambiguation), multiple people
- Cameron Clear (born 1993), football player
- Cameron Cloke (born 1984), Australian rules soccer player
- Cameron Clyne (born 1968), Australian businessman
- Cameron Cobbold, 1st Baron Cobbold (1904–1987), British banker
- Cameron Coetzer (born 1995), South African badminton player
- Cameron Cogburn (born 1986), American cyclist
- Cameron Coleman (born 2006), football player
- Cameron Collins (born 1989), football player
- Cameron Colvin (born 1986), football player
- Cameron Coxe (born 1998), Welsh soccer player
- Cameron Crovetti (born 2008), American actor
- Cameron Crowe (born 1957), American writer and film director
- Cameron Daddo (born 1965), Australian actor, musician and presenter
- Cameron Dallas (born 1994), American film actor
- Cameron Dantzler (born 1998), football player
- Cameron Darkwah (born 1992), English soccer player
- Cameron Das (born 2000), American racing driver
- Cameron Davidson (born 1955), American photographer
- Cameron Davis (disambiguation), multiple people
- Cameron Dawson (born 1995), English soccer player
- Cameron Dicker (born 2000), football player
- Cameron Dollar (born 1975), American basketball player and coach
- Cameron Dorner (born 2004), American football player
- Cameron Douglas (born 1978), American actor
- Cameron Duodu (born 1937), Ghanaian novelist, journalist, editor and broadcaster
- Cameron Dye (born 1959), American actor
- Cameron Echols-Luper (born 1995), football player
- Cameron Edwards (born 1995), Australian soccer player
- Cameron Fraser-Monroe, Indigenous Canadian ballet choreographer
- Cameron Giles (born 1976), American rapper, best known by his stage name Cam'ron
- Cameron Goode (born 1998), football player
- Cameron Hawley (1905–1969), American author
- Cameron Heyward (born 1989), football player
- Cameron Hunt (born 1994), football player
- Cameron Jerome (born 1986), English professional soccer player
- Cameron Jordan (born 1989), defensive end for the football team the New Orleans Saints
- Cameron Kasky (born 2000), Marjory Stoneman Douglas High School shooting survivor and gun control activist
- Cameron Kerry (born 1950), American politician
- Cameron Knowles (born 1982), New Zealand soccer player
- Cameron Krutwig (born 1998), American basketball player
- Cameron Latu (born 2000), football player
- Cameron Ling (born 1981), Australian Rules soccer player
- Cameron "Cam" Lockridge, football player
- Cameron Long (born 1988), American basketball player in the Israeli Premier League
- Cameron Mackintosh (born 1946), British theatrical producer
- Cameron Mathison (born 1969), Canadian-American actor
- Cameron "Cam" McCormick (born 1998), football player
- Cameron McEvoy (born 1994), Australian swimmer
- Cameron McGrone (born 2000), football player
- Cameron McInnes (born 1994), Australian Rugby League player
- Cameron McNeish, Scottish wilderness hiker, backpacker and mountain walker
- Cameron Mitchell (disambiguation), multiple people
- Cameron Monaghan (born 1993), American actor
- Cameron Mooney (born 1979), Australian Rules soccer player
- Cameron A. Morrison (1869–1953), American politician
- Cameron Murray (disambiguation), multiple people
- Cameron Munster (born 1994), Australian rugby league player
- Cameron "Cam" Neely (born 1965), Canadian professional hockey player, actor and general manager of the Boston Bruins
- Cameron "Cam" Newton (born 1989), professional quarterback for the New England Patriots
- Cameron Nizialek (born 1995), football player
- Cameron Norrie, British professional tennis player
- Cameron Reid (born 2007), Canadian ice hockey player
- Cameron Rokhsar, American dermatologist
- Cameron "Cam" Ross (born 2001), American football player
- Cameron Sample (born 1999), football player
- Cameron Samuels, American activist
- Cameron Sexton (born 1970), American politician
- Cameron Sharp (born 1958), Scottish sprinter
- Cameron Smith (disambiguation), multiple people
- Cameron Spalding (born 2005), Canadian snowboarder
- Cameron Stout (born 1971), Scottish television show contestant
- Cameron Sutton (born 1995), football player
- Cameron Talbot (born 1987), Canadian ice hockey player
- Cameron Thomas (disambiguation), multiple people
- Cameron Thompson (politician) (born 1960), Australian politician
- Cameron Toshack (born 1970), Welsh soccer player
- Cameron Ward (ice hockey) (born 1984), Canadian ice hockey player
- Cameron Bethel Ware (1913–1999), Canadian major general
- Cameron Waters (born 1994), Australian race car driver
- Cameron Weston (born 2000), American baseball player
- Cameron Williams (disambiguation), multiple people
- Cameron Winter (born 2002), American musician
- Cameron Young (disambiguation), multiple people

== Women with the given name ==
- Cameron (wrestler) (born 1987), stage name of American wrestler Ariane Nicole Andrew
- Cameron Brink (born 2001), American basketball player
- Cameron Castleberry (born 1995), American association soccer player
- Cameron Clayton (born 1993), American drag queen, model, actress, make-up artist and internet personality
- Cameron McGowan Currie (born 1948), American judge
- Cameron Diaz (born 1972), American actress
- Cameron Dokey (born 1956), American author
- Cameron Esposito (born 1981), American actress, comedian, and broadcaster
- Carmen Gayheart (1970–1994), American murder victim
- Cameron Goodman (born 1984), American actress
- Cameron Kashani (born 1981), Iranian-American entrepreneur, coach, speaker, and advisor
- Cameron Morra (born 1999), American tennis player
- Cameron Cammy Myler (born 1968), American athlete
- Cameron Parker (politician), American politician
- Cameron Quinn, American lawyer
- Cameron Reny, American politician
- Cameron Richardson (born 1979), American actress and model
- Cameron Russell (born 1987), American fashion model
- Cameron Tucker (soccer) (born 1999), football player
- Cameron Tuttle, American author

== Fictional characters ==
- Cameron Black, the main character in the television series Deception
- Cameron Chase, a DC Comics character who works as an agent for the Department of Extranormal Operations
- Cameron Coleman, a character in Vought News Network: Seven on 7 with Cameron Coleman and the third season of The Boys
- Cameron Davenport, a character from Family Affairs
- Cameron Davis, a character from Days of Our Lives
- Cameron Frye, a character in Ferris Bueller's Day Off
- Cameron Howe, a character in the television series Halt and Catch Fire
- Cameron Kelsey, the main character in Malorie Blackman's novel Pig-Heart Boy
- Cameron McLeary, the main character in The Chinese Room's game Still Wakes the Deep
- Cameron Mitchell (Stargate), in the television series Stargate SG-1
- Cameron Parks, one of the main characters in the first two seasons of the American television sitcom A.N.T Farm
- Cameron Poe, the main character of the 1997 film Con Air
- Cameron Phillips, a character in Terminator: The Sarah Connor Chronicles
- Cameron Tucker, in the television series Modern Family
- Cameron Watanabe, the Green Samurai Ranger from Power Rangers: Ninja Storm
- Cameron Corduroy Wilkins, a character from Total Drama: Revenge of the Island
- Cameron (Hollyoaks)
- Cameron, a recurring character in the animated TV series adaptation of Bratz
- Cameron, a character in the children's animated series PJ Masks

== See also ==
- Cam (name), given name and surname
- Camren Bicondova (born 1999), American actress and dancer
- Camerun Peoples (born 1999), football player
