= Cam (name) =

Cam is both a given name and a surname, often a shorthand for Cameron or Camilla. Notable people with the name include:

== Given name ==
- Cam Akers (born 1999), American football player
- Cam Alldred (born 1996), American baseball player
- Cam Allen (born 1999), American football player
- Cam Anthony (born 2001), American singer
- Cam Archer (born 1981), American filmmaker, writer, and photographer
- Cam Atkinson (born 1989), American ice hockey player
- Cam Avery (born 1988), Australian musician
- Cam F. Awesome (born 1988), American boxer born Lenroy Thompson
- Cam Banks, New Zealand game designer
- Cam Barker (born 1986), Canadian ice hockey player
- Cam Bedrosian (born 1991), American baseball player
- Cam Booser (born 1992), American baseball player
- Cam Bragg (born 2005), English footballer
- Cam Brainard, American voice actor and radio host
- Cam Broten (born 1978), Canadian politician
- Cam Brown (disambiguation), multiple people
- Cam Buffington (born 2005), American football player
- Cam Cairncross (born 1972), Australian baseball player
- Cam Calder (born 1952), New Zealand politician
- Cam Cameron (born 1961), American football coach
- Cam Caminiti (born 2006), American baseball player
- Cam Camper (born 2001), American football player
- Cam Cannarella (born 2003), American baseball player
- Cam Carreon (1937–1987), American baseball player
- Cam Cauley (born 2003), American baseball player
- Cam Christie (born 2005), American basketball player
- Cam Clark (born 1993), Australian rugby player
- Cam Clarke, American voice actor
- Cam Connor (born 1954), Canadian ice hockey player
- Cam Corbishley (born 1997), British race walker
- Cam Crawford (born 1988), Australian rugby player
- Cam Dantzler (born 1998), American football player
- Cam Davidson (1877–1940), Canadian ice hockey player
- Cam Dineen (born 1998), American ice hockey player
- Cam DiNunzio, American musician
- Cam Dolan (born 1990), American rugby player
- Cam Donaldson, Scottish economist
- Cam Eden (born 1998), American baseball player
- Cam Ellis-Yolmen (born 1993), Australian rules footballer
- Cam Ellsworth (born 1980), Canadian ice hockey player and coach
- Cam Erving (born 1992), American football player
- Cam Fancher, American football player
- Cam Farrar, Australian musician
- Cam Fletcher (born 1993), New Zealand cricketer
- Cam Fowler (born 1991), Canadian-American ice hockey player
- Cam Gallagher (born 1992), American baseball player
- Cam Gigandet (born 1982), American actor
- Cam Gill (born 1997), American football player
- Cam Glenn (born 1996), American football player
- Cam Gordon (born 1955), American politician
- Cam Grandy (born 2000), American football player
- Cam Grout (born 1939), Canadian swimmer
- Cam Guthrie, Canadian politician
- Cam Hart (born 2000), American football player
- Cam Henderson (1890–1956), American athletic administrator and coach
- Cam Heyward (born 1989), American football player
- Cam Hill (born 1994), American baseball player
- Cam Hobhouse (1786–1869), English politician
- Cam Hubert (1938–2022), Canadian writer
- Cam Jackson (born 1951), Canadian politician
- Cam Jacobs (1962–2023), American football player
- Cam Janssen (born 1984), American-born ice hockey player
- Cam Johnson (defensive end) (born 1990), American football player
- Cam Jones (born 1999), American football player
- Cam Jordan (born 1989), American football player
- Cam Jurgens (born 1999), American football player
- Cam Kennedy, Scottish artist
- Cam Kenney, American politician
- Cam King (born 1991), Australian rugby footballer
- Cam Kirk, American photographer and videographer
- Cam Kirby (1909–2003), Canadian politician and judge
- Cam Kurle (born 1997), British swimmer
- Cam Lampkin (born 2001), American football player
- Cam Lefresne (born 1994), Canadian lawn bowler
- Cam Lewis (born 1997), American football player
- Cam Little (born 2003), American football player
- Cam Lockridge, American football player
- Cam Lyman, American multimillionaire who died mysteriously
- Cam Malfroy (1909–1966), New Zealand tennis player and flying ace
- Cam McCarthy (1995–2024), Australian rules footballer
- Cam McCormick (born 1998), American football player
- Cam McDaniel (born 1991), American football player
- Cam Miller (born 2001), American football player
- Cam Millar (Canadian sportsman) (1927–2020), Canadian player of football, ice hockey and golf
- Cam Millar (rugby union) (born 2002), New Zealand rugby union player
- Cam Munster (born 1994), Australian rugby footballer
- Cam Nancarrow (born 1945), Australian squash player
- Cam Neely (born 1965), Canadian-born ice hockey player
- Cam Newton (born 1989), American football player
- Cam Newton (ice hockey) (born 1950), Canadian former goaltender
- Cam Newton (safety) (born 1982), American former football player
- Cam Norrie (born 1995), British tennis player
- Cam O'bi, American musician
- Cam O'Shea (born 1992), Australian rules footballer
- Cam Oum (1849–1908), Laotian military and political leader
- Cam Paddock (born 1983), Canadian ice hockey player
- Cam Payne (born 1994), American basketball player
- Cam Phillips (born 1995), American football player
- Cam Pipes, Canadian musician
- Cam Plante (born 1964), Canadian ice hockey player
- Cam Polson (born 1989), Canadian rugby union player
- Cam Quayle (born 1972), American football player
- Cam Reddish (born 1999), American basketball player
- Cam Robinson (born 1995), American football player
- Cam Roigard (born 2000), New Zealand rugby player
- Cam Ross (born 2001), American football player
- Cam Schlittler (born 2001), American baseball player
- Cam Severson (born 1978), Canadian ice hockey player
- Cam Simpson, American journalist
- Cam Sims (born 1996), American football player
- Cam Skattebo (born 2002), American football player
- Cam Smith (disambiguation), multiple people
- Cam Spencer (born 2000), American basketball player
- Cam Talbot (born 1987), Canadian ice hockey player
- Cam Taylor-Britt (born 1999), American football player
- Cam Thomas (disambiguation), multiple people
- Cam Van, Vietnamese singer
- Cam Vieaux (born 1993), American baseball player
- Cam Ward (disambiguation), multiple people
- Cam Weaver (born 1983), American soccer player
- Cam Westhead (born 1977), Canadian politician
- Cam Whitmore (born 2004), American basketball player
- Cam Woods (born 1976), Canadian lacrosse player
- Cam Woolley (born 1957), Canadian television journalist and former police officer
- Cam Wright, American politician
- Cam York (born 2001), American ice hockey player
- Cam Young (born 1997), American golfer
- Cam Zink (born 1986), American mountain biker

== Surname ==
- Helen Cam (1885–1968), English historian
- Sandra Cam (born 1972), Belgian freestyle swimmer
- Scott Cam (born 1962), Australian television presenter

== See also ==
- Kam (name), a given name and surname
