= Preston Stutzman =

American actor

- Born: Preston Stutzman
- Education: Anderson University
- Occupations: Film producer, actor
- Spouse: Ela Stutzman
- Children: 1

Preston Stutzman is an American film producer and actor. He produced the 1999 independent film Chillicothe, which was screened at the Sundance Film Festival and the 2005 independent animated film Hoodwinked!, which was one of the first computer-animated films to be completely independently funded. He also performed the minor role of Timmy in Hoodwinked!

== Early life ==
Stutzman grew up in Ohio and graduated from Anderson University in 1992 with degrees in Computer Science and Marketing. While at Anderson University, he befriended fellow students Cory Edwards and Todd Edwards through involvement in the on-campus comedy show "Cheap Thrills".

== Career ==
After graduation, Stutzman got a job at book publishing company Warner Press, but left to be in charge of marketing for Blue Yonder Films, a film production company founded by the Edwards brothers. Though the company started out by producing commercials, it produced the short film Swanky Nights in 1996, and then the 1999 independent film Chillicothe, on which Stutzman served as a producer. The film was directed by Todd Edwards, and premiered at the Sundance Film Festival. The three then moved to Los Angeles, where Stutzman took on an editing job for the Game Show Network, while they looked for funding for new projects Sue Bea Montgomery, who had served as an associate producer on Chillicothe, introduced the three to entrepreneur and inventor Maurice Kanbar, who had invested in their film. Though Kanbar expressed disinterest in the live-action projects that they pitched to him, he grew excited after seeing Wobots, an animated short film that Cory had made, and proposed the idea of making an animated feature that put a twist on a familiar fairy tale. The brothers came up with the idea of telling Little Red Riding Hood as a police investigation, and Kanbar agreed to fully finance the film, before they had even shown him a finished script. The film, titled Hoodwinked!, was directed by Cory Edwards, Todd Edwards, and Tony Leech, and Stutzman and Montgomery both served as producers on the film. Stutzman also took on a minor role, playing the part of Timmy. It was one of the first computer-animated films to be fully independently funded, and due to its small budget, its animation was produced in Manila, Philippines. The film was released in 2005, receiving mixed reviews, and earning over $110 million worldwide.

== Personal life ==
Stutzman met his wife Ela in 2003, while working on Hoodwinked! in Manila, after the death of his older brother, Tyler Maxwell Stutzman and married her in 2007. They moved to Vancouver, where their child Jacob Tyler was born. They then moved to Fort Myers, Florida in 2010 to be near Preston's sister Trinda and brother-in-law Mike. While there, Preston worked as a director of production and video producer/editor at Next Level Church and Ela worked as a nurse. In early 2012 they moved with Trinda and Mike to Tennessee to help plant Story Church.
