= Cammy (name) =

Cammy or Cammie is a given name. It is often short for Camilla or Cameron. Notable people with the name include:

== People ==
=== Male ===
- Cammy Bell (born 1986), Scottish footballer
- Cameron Boyle, Scottish rugby union player capped for Scotland three times in 1963
- Peter "Cammy" Cammell, former member of the English rock band The La's
- Cammie Fraser (born 1941), Scottish former footballer
- Cammy Fraser (born 1957), Scottish former footballer
- Cameron Glasgow (born 1966), Scottish former rugby union player
- Cammy Kerr (born 1995), Scottish footballer
- Cameron MacDonald (born 1989), Scottish footballer
- Cammy Murray (1944–2025), Scottish footballer
- Cammie Smith (born 1933), West Indian former cricketer
- Cammy Smith (born 1995), Scottish footballer

=== Female ===
- Cammie Dunaway, American business executive
- Cammi Granato (born 1971), American hockey player and Hall of Famer
- Cammie King (1934–2010), American child actress
- Cammie Lusko (born 1958), American bodybuilder
- Cammy MacGregor (born 1968), American former tennis player
- Cammie McGovern, American novelist, younger sister of actress Elizabeth McGovern
- Cammy Myler (born 1968), American former luger

== Fictional characters ==
- Cammy White, in the Street Fighter video game series
- Cammi (character), in Marvel Comics
- Camilla "Cammie" Sheppard, in The A-List (novel series)
- Cammy Meele, in Ace Attorney Investigations: Miles Edgeworth

== See also ==
- Kammy (disambiguation)
