= Kanbar Entertainment =

Independent film studio

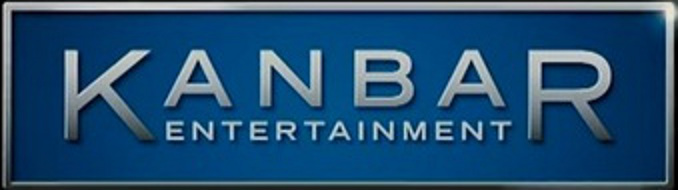
- Industry: Film
- Founded: 2002; 24 years ago
- Founder: Maurice Kanbar; Sue Bea Montgomery
- Headquarters: San Francisco, California, United States
- Products: Motion pictures
- Divisions: Kanbar Animation

Kanbar Entertainment is an independent film production studio founded by private investor Maurice Kanbar and Hollywood veteran Sue Bea Montgomery in 2002. The studio produced Hoodwinked!, which was one of the first computer-animated films to be entirely independently financed.

The film was produced on a budget of less than $8 million, considerably less than the typical budget for an animated film. To save costs, Kanbar Entertainment founded the animation studio Digital Eye Candy in Manila, Philippines to create most of the film's animation in which hired a small group of independent animators.

The Weinstein Company signed on as the film's distributor near the end of its production and it was released in December 2005. The film received mixed reviews, but was financially successful, earning over $110 million worldwide.

Hoodwinked!'s success led to a sequel being announced in January 2006. Although Kanbar Entertainment originally intended to finance the film entirely on its own, Kanbar was convinced by The Weinstein Company to enter into a co-financing agreement with the studio. This allowed the film to be produced on a larger budget than its predecessor at $30 million.

The film was initially scheduled for a January 2010 release, but in December 2009, The Weinstein Company postponed the release date.

Kanbar Entertainment sued The Weinstein Company in March 2010, claiming that the delay violated their agreement and also accusing the studio of not contributing to monthly production accounts after February 2009, neglecting to consult them on a release strategy, and failing to respond to proposed changes to the film, even though they held "final authority on production decisions". Hoodwinked Too! Hood vs. Evil was eventually released in April 2011 to be widely panned by critics and became a financial failure, earning $23.1 million worldwide; less than its budget.

Kanbar Entertainment enlisted InterWorks, Inc. to create an Android based video game of Hoodwinked Too! Hood vs. Evil. Kanbar Entertainment had several ideas proposed to them by InterWorks, Inc. and chose Hoodwinked Too! Decoder Game, which was released on the Android Market in correlation with the film's April 29, 2011 release date.

Kanbar Entertainment also produced Lifelines, which was released in 2009 and Seducing Charlie Barker, which was released in 2010.

== Kanbar Animation ==
Kanbar Animation
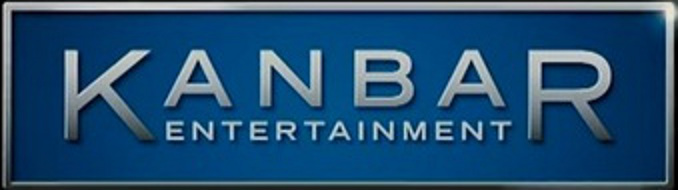
- Type: Division
- Industry: Animation
- Founded: 2002; 24 years ago
- Founder: Maurice Kanbar; Sue Bea Montgomery
- Headquarters: San Francisco, California, United States
- Products: Animated Films
- Owner: Kanbar Entertainment

Maurice Kanbar and Sue Bea Montgomery also founded the studio Kanbar Animation in 2002 for the production of Hoodwinked! Kanbar Animation was described by Variety as the "animation banner" of Kanbar Entertainment. It was only used for two films, the first and its sequel Hoodwinked Too! Hood vs. Evil.
