= David K. Lovegren =

David K. Lovegren is a film producer. After working on Fantasia/2000 and the Direct-to-video feature The Little Mermaid II: Return to the Sea at Disney, he went to Manila, Philippines to start the independent animation studio ImagineAsia. The company was shut down after failing to attract business, but in January 2002 Lovegren hired back around twenty animators that had been employed there to work on the 2005 animated film Hoodwinked!. Along with fellow Hoodwinked! producer Sue Bea Montgomery, Lovegren formed a new animation studio for the film's production, based in a 5,000 square foot rented house in Manila. Hoodwinked! was the first independent computer-animated film to be produced in the Philippines, and one of the first computer-animated films to be completely independently funded. Lovegren also produced the 2010 animated film Dino Time and the 2011 sequel to Hoodwinked!, Hoodwinked Too! Hood vs. Evil.

Lovegren is a graduate of Principia College, Elsah, Illinois.

== Filmography ==
Year	Title	Notes
1999	Fantasia/2000	co-associate producer
2000	The Little Mermaid 2: Return to the Sea	producer
2005	Hoodwinked!	producer
2010	Dino Time	producer
2011	Hoodwinked Too! Hood vs. Evil	co-producer
