= Hoodwinked! =

2005 film by Cory Edwards

- Theatrical release poster
- Directed by: Cory Edwards
- Screenplay by: Cory Edwards; Todd Edwards; Tony Leech
- Story by: Todd Edwards; Cory Edwards
- Based on: "Little Red Riding Hood" by Anonymous
- Produced by: Maurice Kanbar; David K. Lovegren; Sue Bea Montgomery; Preston Stutzman
- Starring: Anne Hathaway; Glenn Close; Jim Belushi; Patrick Warburton; Anthony Anderson; David Ogden Stiers; Xzibit; Chazz Palminteri; Andy Dick
- Edited by: Tony Leech
- Music by: John Mark Painter
- Production companies: Kanbar Entertainment; Kanbar Animation; Blue Yonder Films
- Distributed by: The Weinstein Company
- Release dates: December 16, 2005 (Los Angeles); January 13, 2006 (United States)
- Running time: 81 minutes
- Country: United States
- Language: English
- Budget: $8 million
- Box office: $110 million

Hoodwinked! is a 2005 American animated comedy film directed by Cory Edwards, who co-wrote the screenplay with his brother Todd Edwards and Tony Leech from a story by the Edwards brothers. It retells the folktale "Little Red Riding Hood" as a police procedural, using backstories to show multiple characters' points of view. The film features the voices of Anne Hathaway, Glenn Close, Jim Belushi, Patrick Warburton, Anthony Anderson, David Ogden Stiers, Xzibit, Chazz Palminteri, and Andy Dick.

Hoodwinked! was among the earliest computer-animated films to be completely independently funded. Working apart from a major studio allowed the filmmakers greater creative control, but also restrained them economically. Due to the film's low budget, its animation was produced in the Philippines with a stylized design inspired by stop motion films. The Weinstein Company did not sign on as the film's distributor until near the end of production, and while the company had several roles recast with higher-profile actors, it otherwise made few changes to the film. Structurally, the film was inspired by non-linear crime dramas, such as Rashomon and Pulp Fiction. It was released shortly after the first two installments in the successful Shrek series by DreamWorks Animation, which accentuated the fairy tale parody genre of which Hoodwinked! is a part. Hoodwinked!, however, intentionally deviated from the Shrek series in its style of humor and in certain plot elements. This was in part based on Cory Edwards' concerns over exposing children to the high level of cynicism often found in the genre.

The film was released in Los Angeles and Philadelphia on December 16, 2005, for a one-week engagement, before expanding nationwide on January 13, 2006. The film received mixed reviews from critics, who praised its clever script and voice acting but criticized its low-budget computer animation. It was a commercial success, grossing $110 million against an $8 million budget. A sequel, Hoodwinked Too! Hood vs. Evil, was released in 2011, to critical and commercial failure.

== Plot ==
Red Puckett arrives at her Granny's house, where Wolf W. Wolf, an anthropomorphic gray wolf, has disguised himself as the latter. As Wolf attacks Red, a bound Granny jumps out of a closet before a woodsman named Kirk bursts through the window. A police investigation led by Detective Nicky Flippers ensues.

The police question Red first, who explains she was delivering goodies for Granny's pastry business when she discovered a threat from the mysterious Goody Bandit, who has been stealing recipes and causing pastry businesses to shut down. Red had set out to take the Puckett recipe book to Granny's mountaintop home for safekeeping, but fell out of a cable car owned by her rabbit friend Boingo and encountered Wolf, who asked her suspicious questions. After evading him, she met a goat named Japeth, who accompanied her to Granny's house, where she found Wolf waiting to ambush her.

Wolf reveals that he is an investigative reporter who was searching for a lead on the Goody Bandit's identity and had reason to believe that Granny and Red were connected. Wolf and his hyperactive squirrel assistant and photographer Twitchy confronted Red in hope of solving the mystery. When they failed to detain Red, they made haste for Granny's house, arriving ahead of her through a shortcut known to Boingo. They found Granny already tied up in the closet before Wolf disguised himself as her using her merchandise, planning to trick Red into revealing the truth about the Goody Bandit.

Kirk explains his appearance at Granny's house was a coincidence. He is an aspiring actor trying out for the part of a woodsman for a commercial. After his schnitzel truck was robbed by the Goody Bandit, he was consoled by Boingo, then received a callback for the commercial. He spent the rest of the day getting into character by chopping trees. While chopping one near Granny's house, he was distracted by noises coming inside, causing a tree he left unfinished to collapse and push him through the window of Granny's house.

Granny reveals she is secretly an extreme sports enthusiast. Earlier that day, she competed in a ski race, with Boingo spectating, until she was attacked by the opposing team. Discovering they were hired by the Goody Bandit to eliminate her and Red, Granny parachuted home, but was entangled in her parachute cords and thrown into her closet by her ceiling fan before Wolf arrived.

Feeling betrayed by Granny's secrecy, Red wanders off alone. Flippers deduces that Boingo, who was present in all four stories, is the Goody Bandit. Red notices Boingo sneaking in and stealing the recipe book. She follows him to his cable car station hideout and confronts him, but is overpowered and captured. With the police pursuing Boingo in the wrong direction, Wolf sends Twitchy to get them back while he, Granny, and Kirk locate Boingo as he explains to Red his plan to add addictive "Boingonium" to the recipes, then bulldoze the forest to build a corporate empire.

Wolf and Kirk distract Boingo as Granny sneaks into his lair, but they are all found out. Boingo sends Red down the mountain in a cable car loaded with explosives, but Granny rescues her before the police arrest Boingo and his henchmen. Afterward, Kirk finds success in a yodeling troupe while Red, Granny, Wolf, and Twitchy are enlisted by Flippers to join the "Happily Ever After" crime-solving agency.

== Voice cast ==
- Anne Hathaway as Red Puckett, a young girl and worker at her Granny's bakery.
- Patrick Warburton as Wolf W. Wolf, a gray wolf investigative reporter.
- Glenn Close as Abigail "Granny" Puckett, Red's grandma, bakery owner, and extreme sports enthusiast.
- Jim Belushi as Kirk Kirkendall the Woodsman, an Austrian aspiring actor who owns a schnitzel truck.
- Cory Edwards as Twitchy, a fast-talking, coffee-addicted squirrel and Wolf's assistant and photographer.
- David Ogden Stiers as Detective Nicky Flippers, a British frog detective who is the head of the Happily Ever After Agency (HEA).
- Andy Dick as Boingo, a rabbit who secretly operates as the Goody Bandit.
- Anthony Anderson as Detective Bill Stork, a stork detective.
- Xzibit as Chief Ted Grizzly, a bear and the chief of police.
- Benjy Gaither as Japeth the Goat, a mountain goat who owns a minecart business and is always singing due to a supposed curse by a mountain witch.
- Chazz Palminteri as Woolworth, a sheep and an informant of Wolf's.
- Ken Marino as Raccoon Jerry, a raccoon police officer.
- Tom Kenny as Tommy, a pig police officer.
- Preston Stutzman as Timmy, a pig police officer.
- Tony Leech as Glen, a pig police officer.
- Joshua J. Greene as James "Jimmy" Lizard, a lizard and the director of the Paul's Bunion Cream commercials.
- Mark Primiano as 2-Tone, a penguin and one of Granny's skiing friends.
- Kevin Michael Richardson as P-Biggie, a polar bear and one of Granny's skiing friends.
- Tara Strong as Zorra, a red fox and one of Granny's skiing friends.
- Tye Edwards as Dolph, Boingo's German sidekick and the leader of the Evil Ski Team.
- Todd Edwards as Sandwich Man, an obese Snack Shack proprietor who wears a white tiger costume.
- Kathryn J. Lovegren as Quill, a woodpecker and one of Red's woodland friends.
- Charles Coplin as Caterpillar 1
- Troy Norton as Caterpillar 2
- Kelly Stables as Schnitzel Kid 1
- Eli Montgomery as Schnitzel Kid 2
- Cameron Barr as Skunk Reporter

== Production ==
... I realize that there were other independently funded projects being done at the same time, but ... we were the first ... the first kind of a new model and a new way of making an animated film. It was made with no studio money, overseas, then picked up by a major distributor. A few other animated films have followed this path, but not to the level of success that Hoodwinked was able to achieve. I know VeggieTales had a movie come out earlier that year, but that was with a struck deal and brand recognition. Hoodwinked was this freak of nature that was made completely outside of the studio system and, thankfully, worked.

— Director and co-writer Cory Edwards

Hoodwinked! was one of the first independent computer-animated films to be produced without the aid of a distributor. Although the film's budget is listed as $30 million on Box Office Mojo, several sources have rejected this figure, reporting that the film was produced for no more than $15 million. Director Cory Edwards explained in a 2009 interview that the film's actual budget was under $8 million. Any of these figures would be significantly lower than is typical for a computer-animated film's budget. At the time of Hoodwinked!'s production, the costs of computer-animation software had only recently decreased to a price that was accessible to more than just major studios, and leading up to the film's release, producer David Lovegren said, "Six or seven years ago, the idea of doing Hoodwinked! as an independent [animated] feature would have been impossible".

The filmmakers only made the film independently by necessity, and Cory Edwards has said, "It's not a model to be followed. It was a once-in-a-lifetime, seat-of-your-pants kind of thing that just barely came off." However, he added that the process was worth going through to get the film made and encouraged aspiring filmmakers to be willing to follow it.

=== Development ===
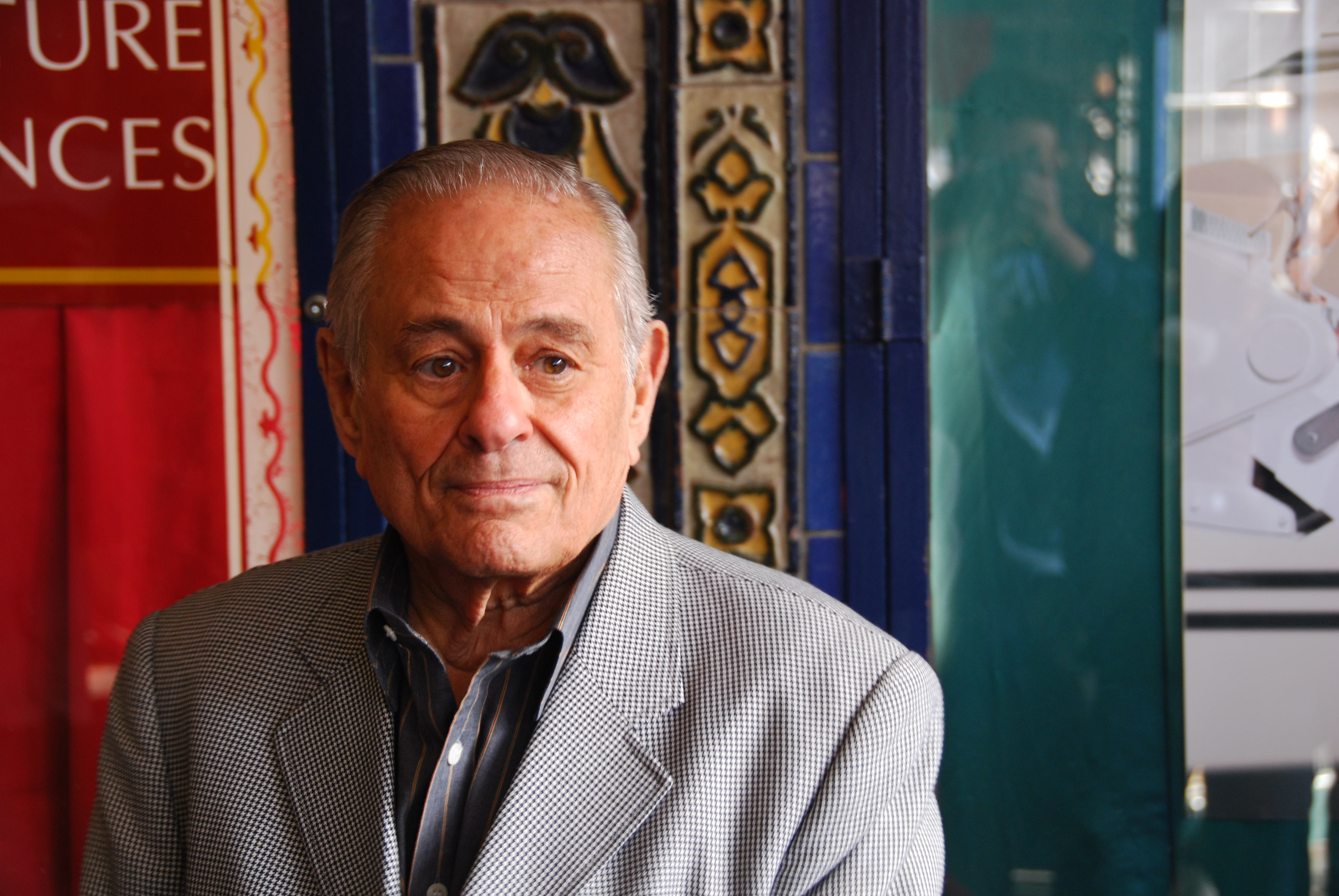
The film's production was privately financed by entrepreneur Maurice Kanbar.

After a number of years spent producing commercials and music videos in Tulsa, brothers Cory and Todd Edwards founded their own production company, Blue Yonder Films. Joined by their friends producers Brad Knull, Robert Yanovitch and Preston Stutzman, who also led marketing for the company, the group released their first feature film, Chillicothe, at the 1999 Sundance Film Festival. Emboldened by this success, the company then moved to Los Angeles in the hopes of producing a sophomore film. Blue Yonder evolved as Knull and Yanovitch left to pursue other interests, and new opportunities for the remaining three partners proved elusive at first. An associate producer on Chillicothe, Sue Bea Montgomery, sought out studios that might want to work with the trio; she was met with indifference and determined that Blue Yonder Films would have to further establish itself on the independent scene before anyone would take interest. Montgomery then set up a meeting between the filmmakers and Maurice Kanbar, a successful entrepreneur who had made a minor investment in Chillicothe.

The Edwards brothers pitched a number of ideas for live-action films to Kanbar and proposed a development deal that would have entailed Kanbar paying the group and covering their rent in exchange for a significant portion of the rights to any scripts that Blue Yonder Films ever sold. Kanbar, however, was interested in a more direct approach, preferring to focus efforts on getting a single film produced. He had always admired animation, and after seeing a direct-to-DVD computer-animated short film that Cory had made called Wobots, suggested the possibility of producing an animated feature with Blue Yonder Films, one that would tell a familiar narrative with a twist. Kanbar gave the group a month to come up with a story idea.

Although Kanbar expressed interest in producing a retelling of "Cinderella" or The Adventures of Pinocchio, the Edwards brothers insisted on avoiding stories that had already been defined by The Walt Disney Company. Several ideas were considered by the brothers. Cory suggested "Little Red Riding Hood", describing it as a story "so simple that you can go a lot of different directions with it", and within a few days, inspiration came to Todd through non-linear crime dramas, such as Rashomon (1950), Pulp Fiction (1994), Run Lola Run (1998) and Memento (2000). Todd's proposal to retell "Little Red Riding Hood" as a police investigation, exploring the narrative through multiple points of view, was embraced by Kanbar, who agreed to fully finance the film before seeing a finished script. Kanbar's initial plan was to release the film directly to DVD. In 2002, Kanbar and Montgomery joined together in founding Kanbar Entertainment and Kanbar Animation, independent production studios that teamed with Blue Yonder Films for the production of Hoodwinked!

Cory served as the film's main director, as he had more experience with animation, comedy, and children's entertainment, while Todd served as co-director. Montgomery and Stutzman were joined by Disney animation veteran David Lovegren as producers on the film, and Cory's and Todd's sister Katie Hooten joined as an associate producer. Tony Leech, who had worked with the Edwards brothers on Chillicothe, was initially hired as an editor, but gained story input as well. He eventually proved to be so valuable to the production that he was given a role as co-director.

=== Pre-production ===
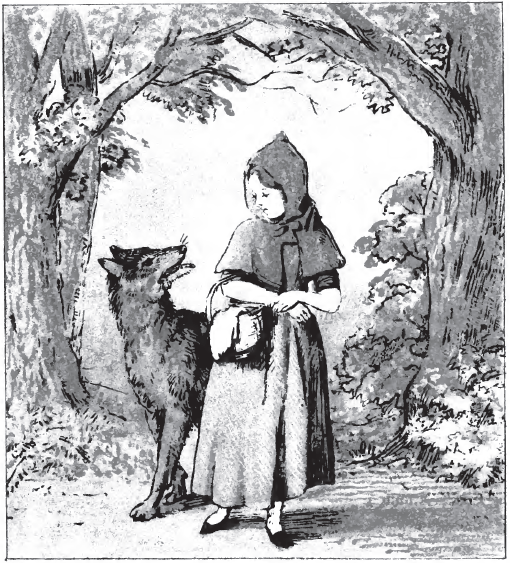
Hoodwinked! is a parody of the European fairy tale Little Red Riding Hood.

The filmmakers found independently producing the film to have both benefits and challenges. Although they were given a great amount of creative control by their executive producer Maurice Kanbar, their small budget kept them from making potentially beneficial changes to the story once production was underway. Todd Edwards related that "Money doesn't just buy you more talent and more machinery, it also buys you flexibility on a story level. At Disney, if they don't like the third act, they just throw the whole thing out and re-animate the whole thing, even if it's finished ... We had no such luxury, and so in a way, you're watching our first version of the movie." Knowing ahead of time their inability to alter the film's script once animating had begun, an effort was made by the filmmakers to finalize the script as much as possible before the start of production, which is not a common practice for studio-produced animated films.

Turning away from the well-known archetypes of the Little Red Riding Hood characters, the filmmakers continued to look towards non-linear crime dramas for inspiration instead. Producer Preston Stutzman explained that "The whole film is about surprises and secret lives". Not wanting Red to be "boring" or "too innocent", she was patterned on James Dean and given the desire of leaving home to find her way in the world. Todd Edwards had the idea of basing the Wolf on Chevy Chase's character in Fletch (1985), feeling that it would be fun to apply the character's dry, deadpan style of humor to an animated wolf, while Cory Edwards created the hyperactive character of Twitchy to serve as the Wolf's foil. Going against types, Red's Granny was written as a thrill-seeking action hero, while the strong Woodsman was written as being childishly incompetent.

The police officers were written to come across as everyday guys and Cory Edwards has explained that the decision to make three of them pigs was not politically motivated. Nicky Flippers was not a part of the story as it was initially conceived and prior to his creation, the investigation was going to be led by Chief Grizzly. After producer Sue Bea Montgomery and her husband pointed out similarities between their film and the 1950s film/TV series The Thin Man, the Edwards brothers and Leech decided to introduce the character and his dog into the film as a homage to Nick Charles. They considered several different types of animals before settling on making him a frog.

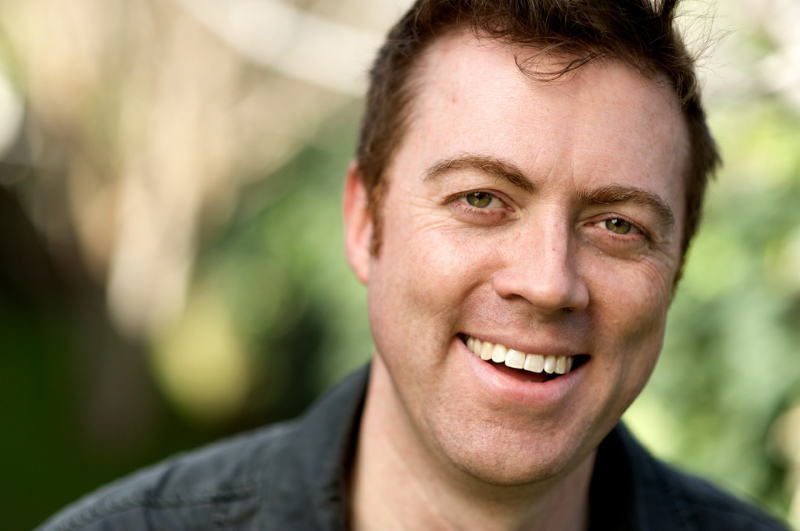
Director and co-writer Cory Edwards also co-wrote two of the film's songs, performed one of them, and voiced the character Twitchy.

Cory Edwards chose to approach the film predominantly as an action/comedy, instead of as a typical animated film, and wrote the script to appeal to audiences of any age like many of the films produced by Pixar or Disney. Bugs Bunny, Road Runner, The Adventures of Rocky and Bullwinkle and Friends, The Muppets, The Simpsons and The Incredibles (2004) have all been cited as inspirations for the film. An attempt was made to distance the film from Shrek and other similar themed films that had been recently released, by excluding magic, wizards, and fairies from the film. Cory Edwards also strived for a different style of humor than Shrek, choosing to make his film more family-friendly and less of a satire. Working out of Todd and Preston’s apartment, Cory and Todd Edwards initially wrote the script while Cory sketched most of the film's storyboards, and Todd wrote the songs. Leech simultaneously scanned the boards and edited the story reel on his Mac computer. The first (temp) voice cast was the three of them. Producer Sue Bea Montgomery showed test screenings of the story reel to children in her neighborhood, and gained input from their reactions. The filmmakers had been considering removing Japeth the goat, but chose not to when he proved one of the most popular characters at these screenings. The children also particularly liked Twitchy, which led to the expansion of the character's role.

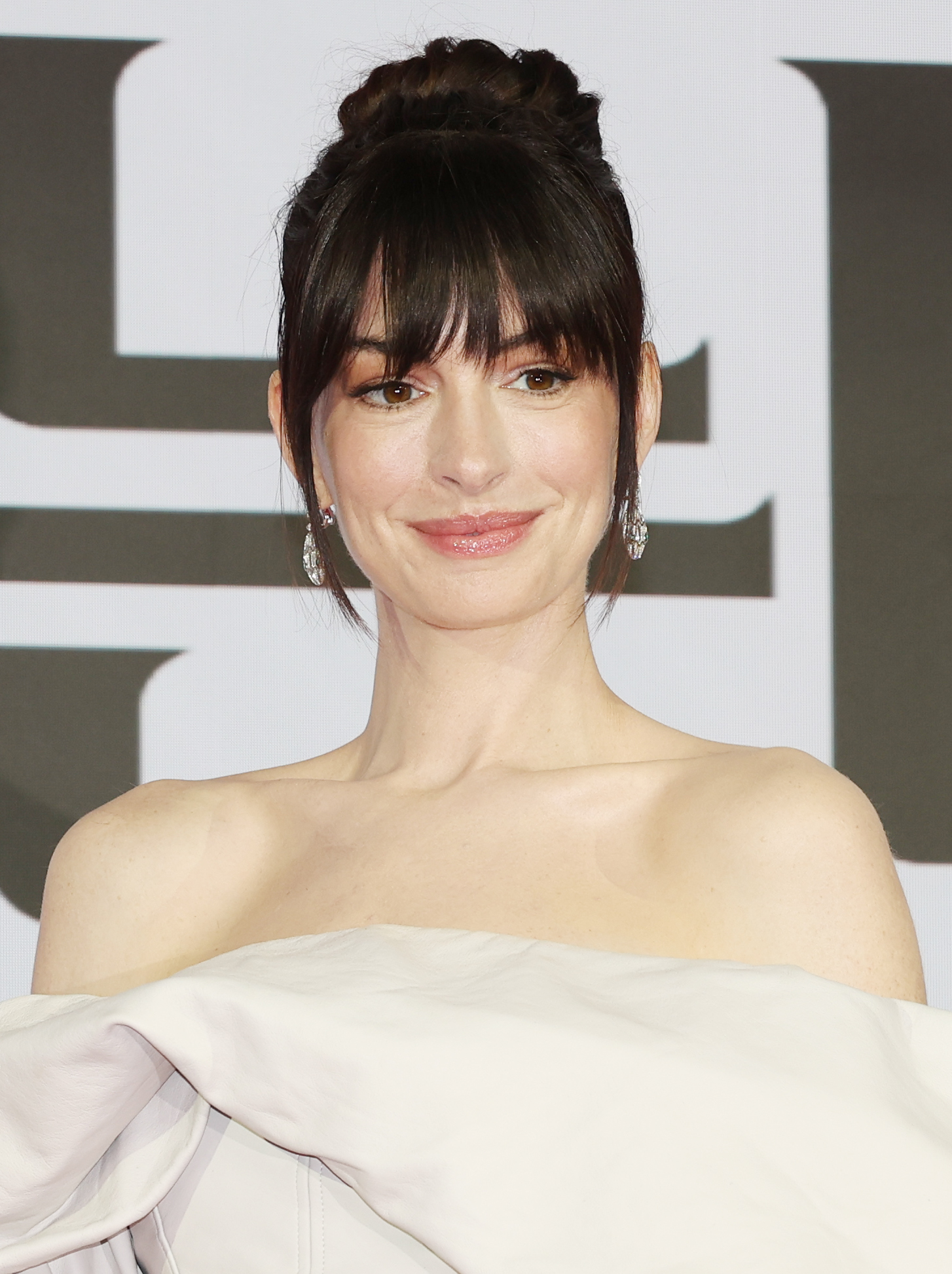
Anne Hathaway
(Red)

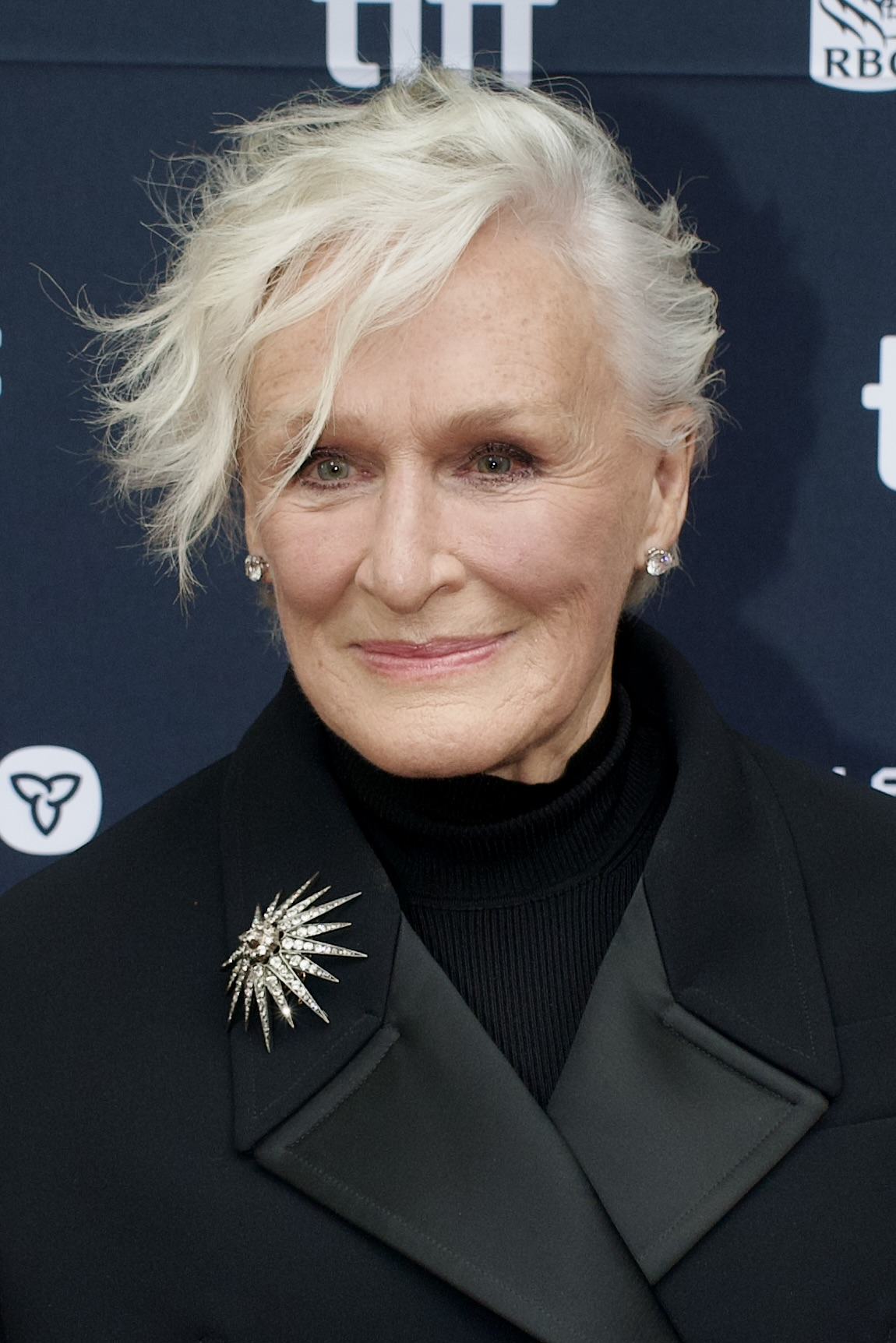
Glenn Close
(Granny)

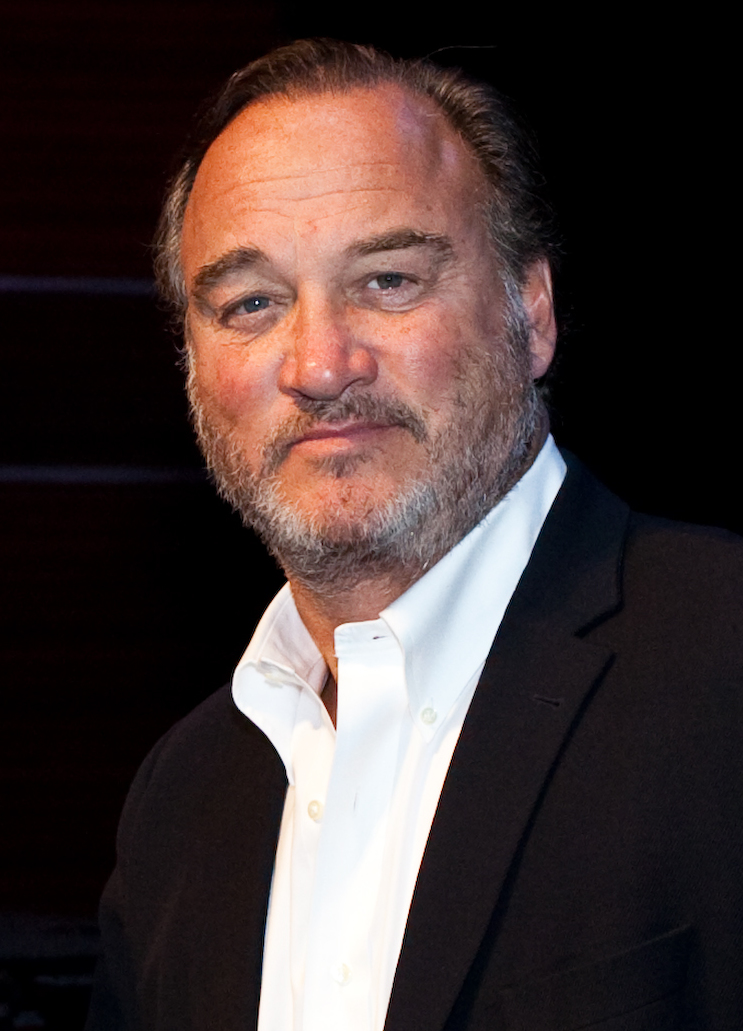
Jim Belushi
(Kirk Kirkendall)

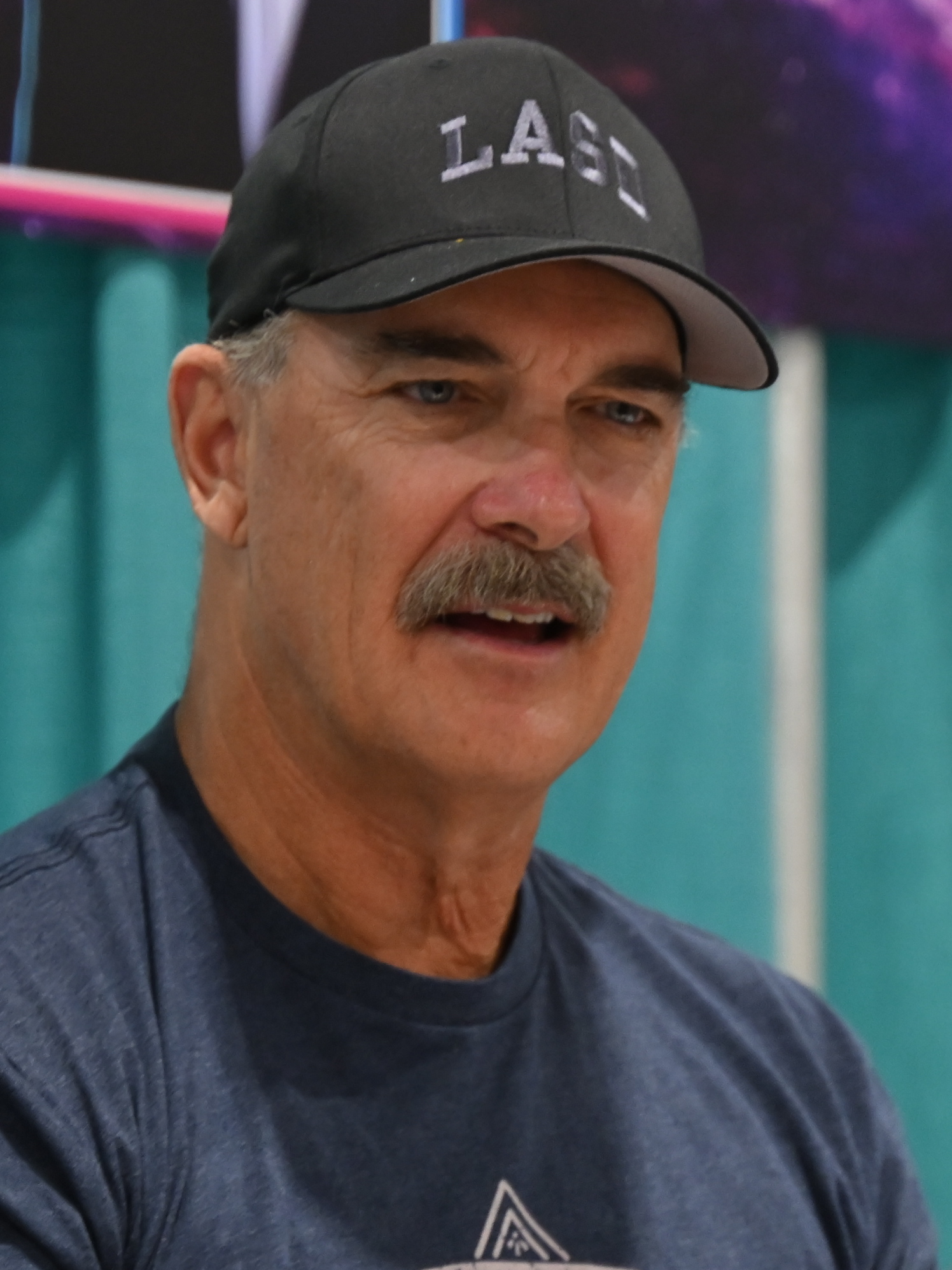
Patrick Warburton
(Wolf)

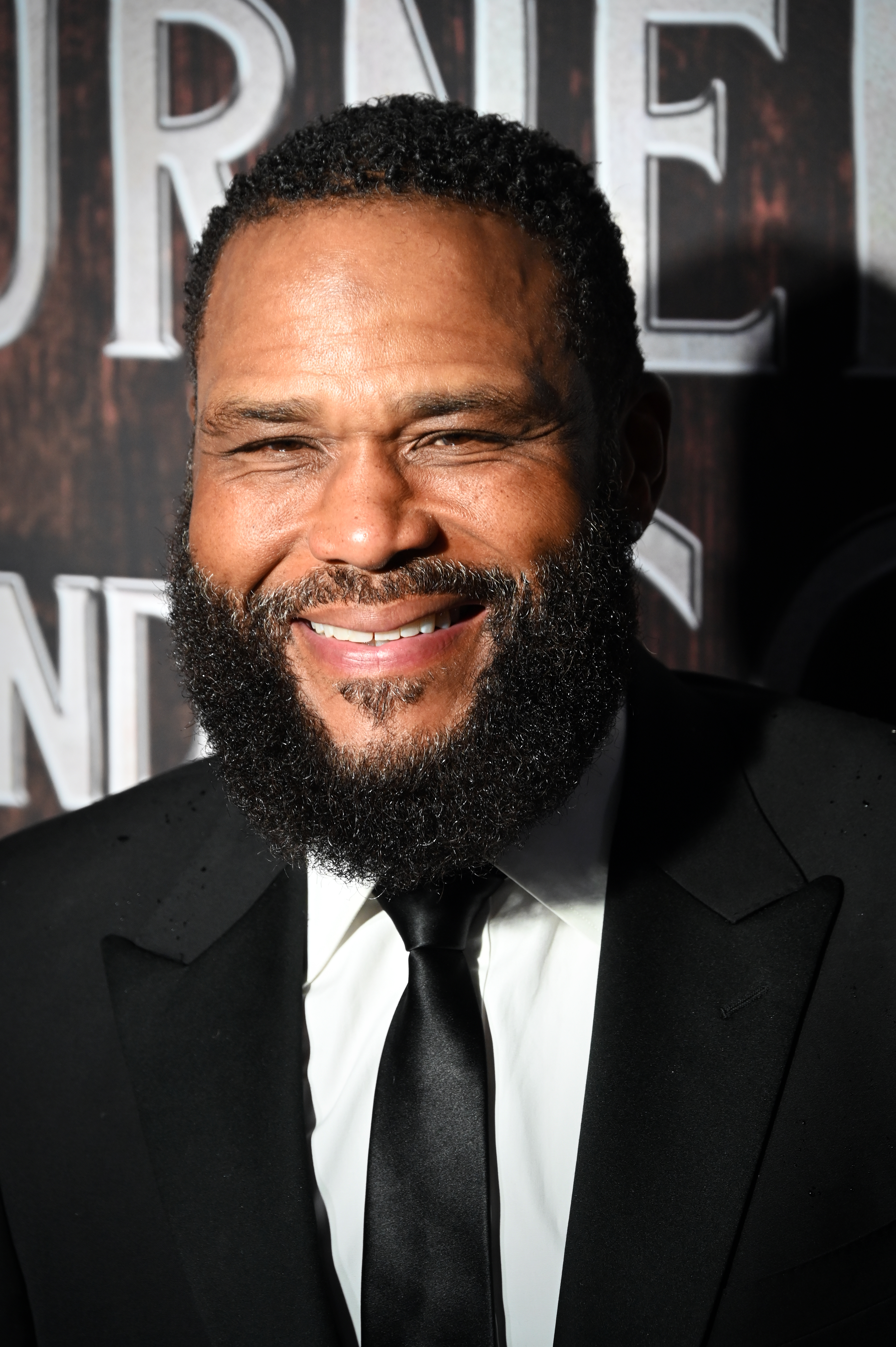
Anthony Anderson
(Detective Bill Stork)

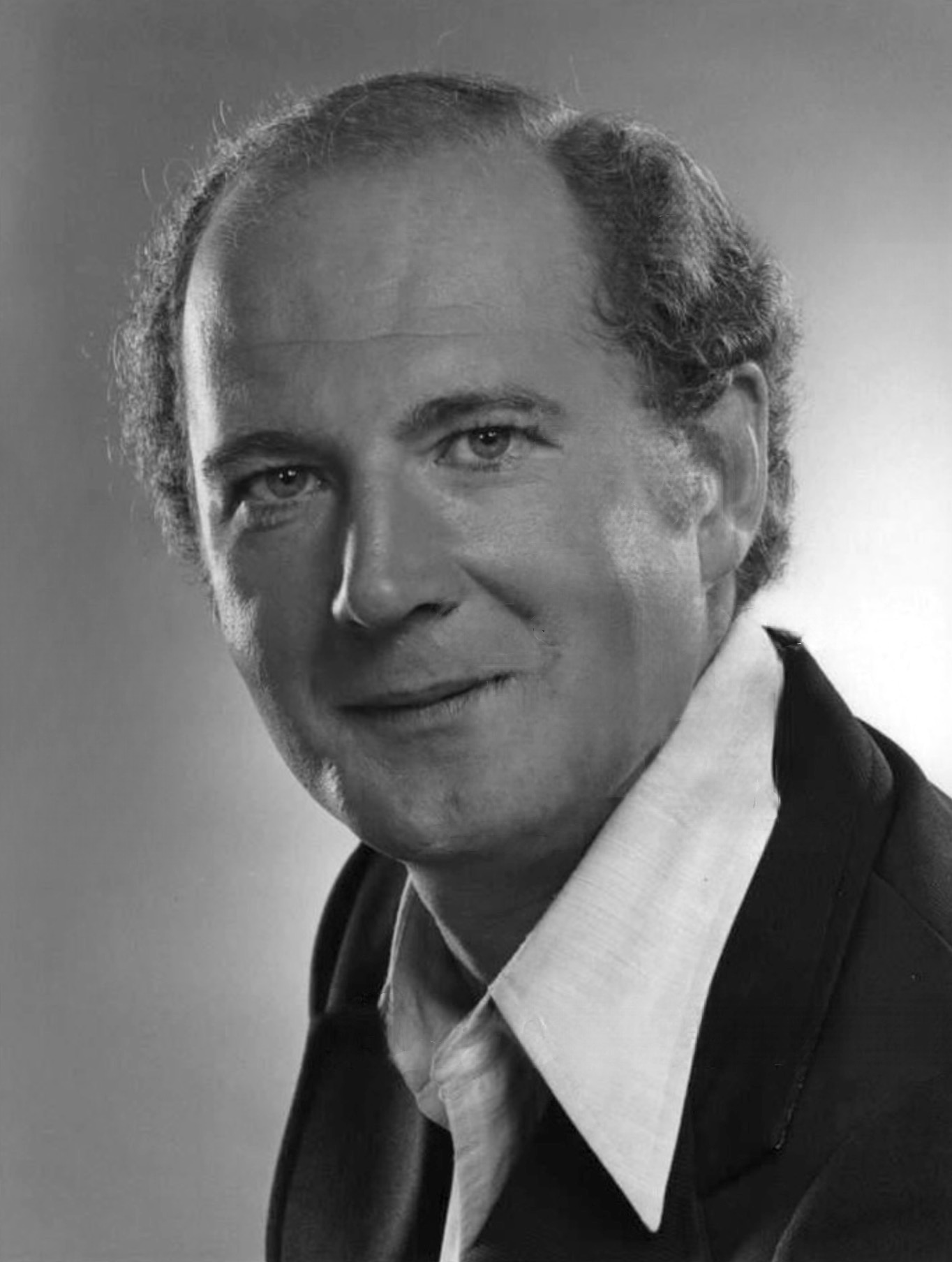
David Ogden Stiers
(Nicky Flippers)

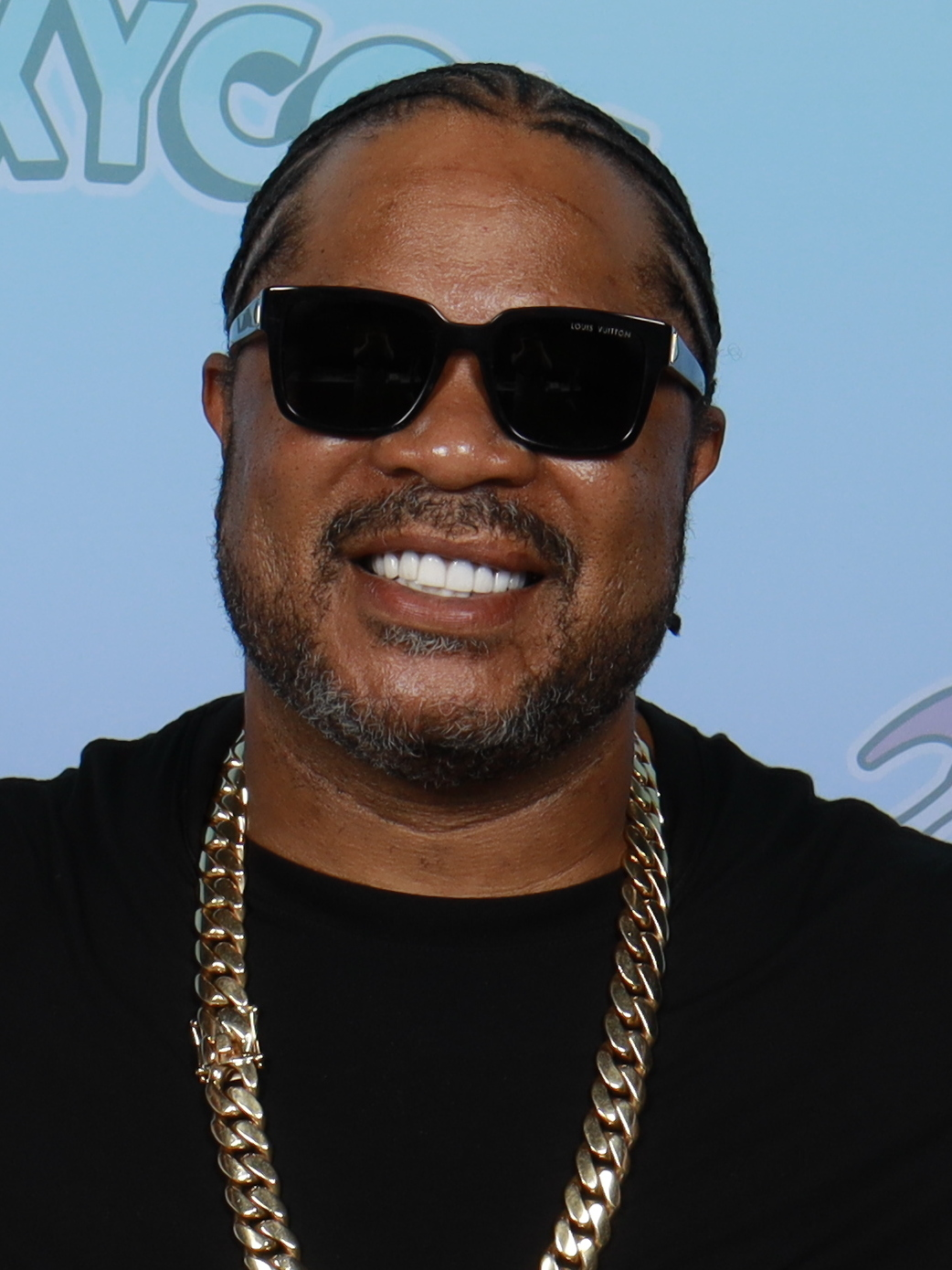
Xzibit
(Chief Grizzly)

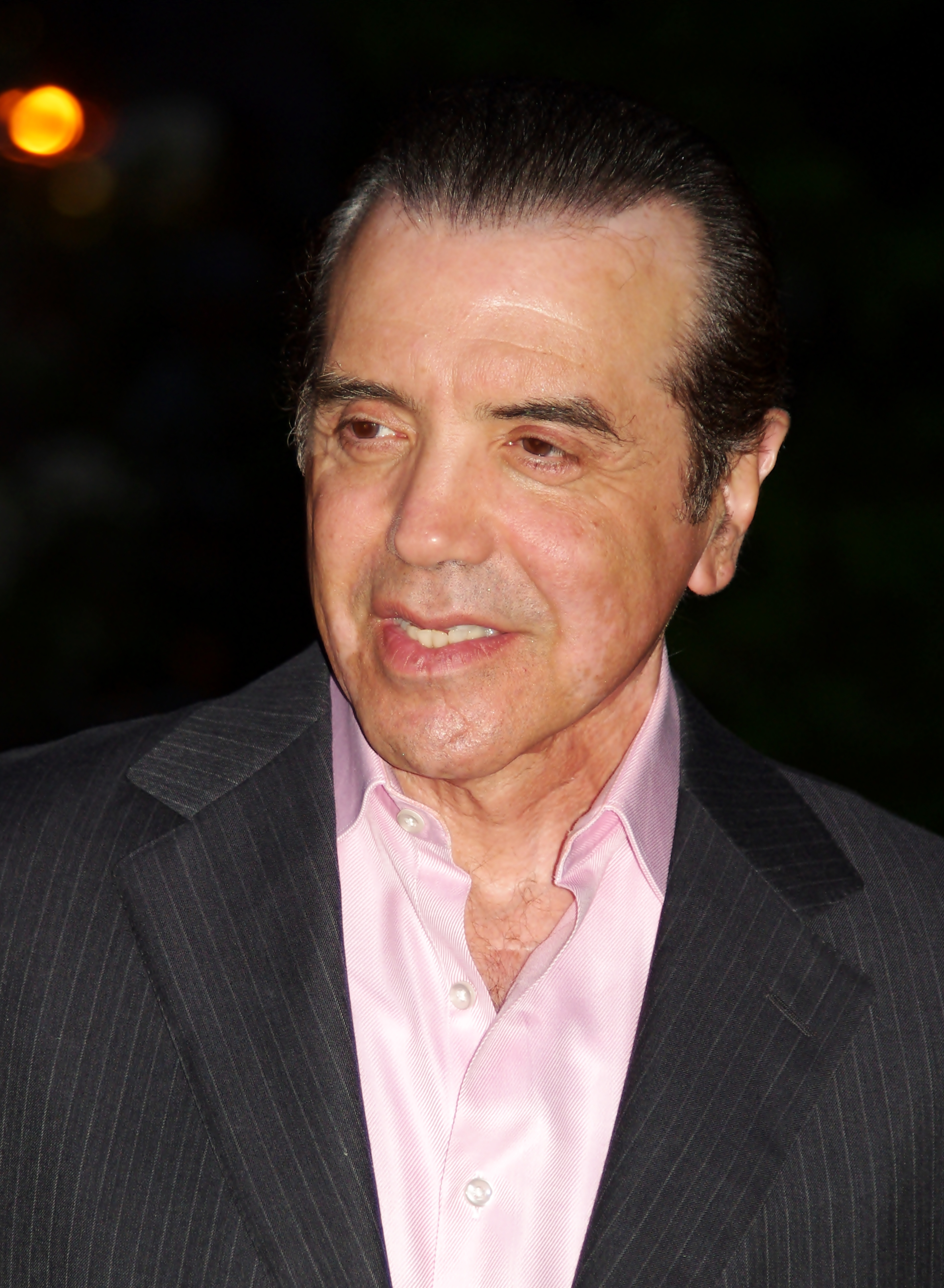
Chazz Palminteri
(Woolworth)

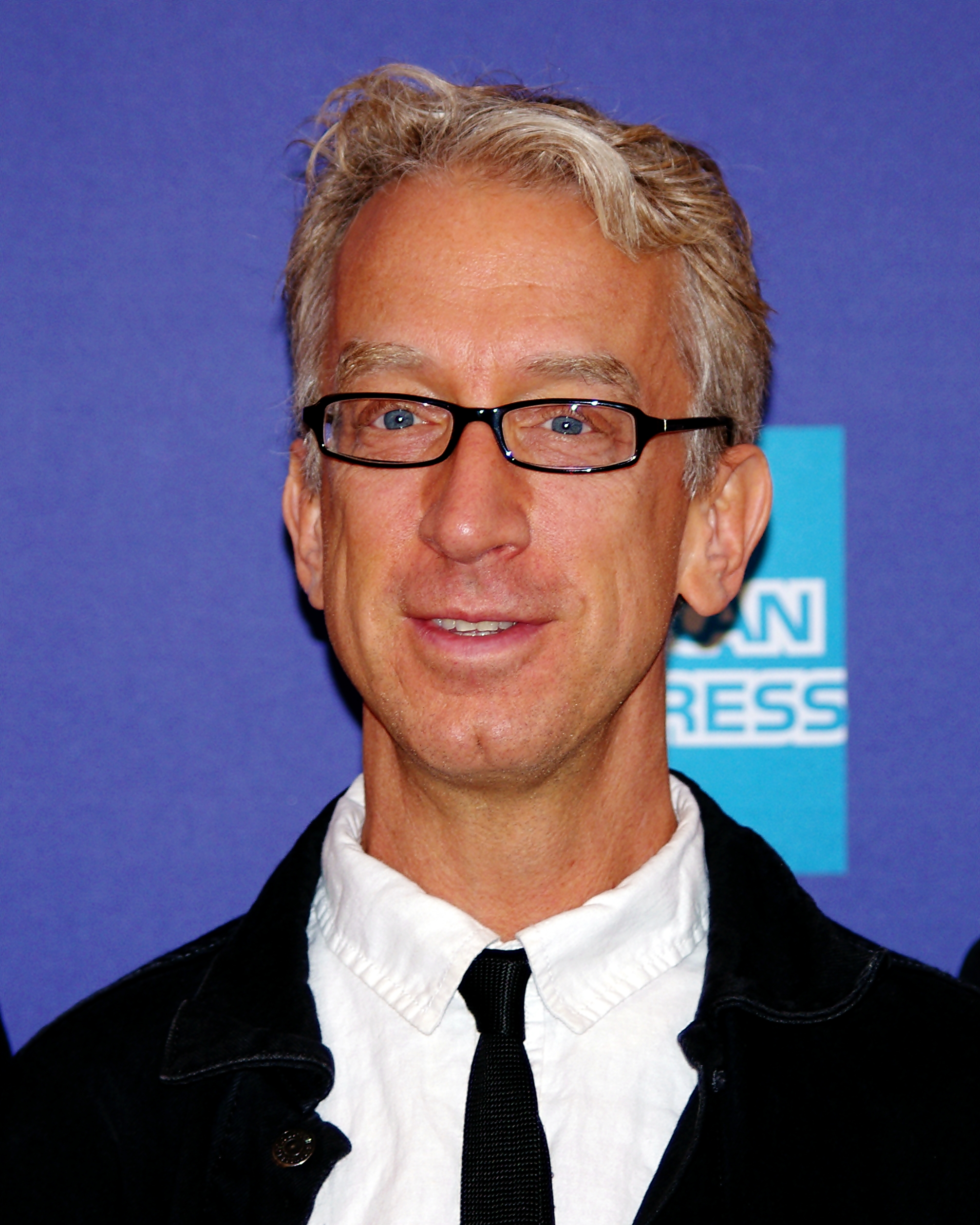
Andy Dick
(Boingo)

In an effort to save costs, the film's cast was originally going to be composed mostly of friends and family members of the filmmakers. Cory and Todd brought in their cousin Tye Edwards to play Dolph and turned to their friend Joshua J. Greene to play Jimmy Lizard. Japeth was written specifically for Benjy Gaither, the son of gospel music singers Bill and Gloria Gaither. He had been a friend of the Edwards brothers since childhood and Cory's short film Wobots had been produced through his animation studio Live Bait Productions. Cory's wife Vicki was given the role of a skunk reporter, and while some consideration was initially given to having an adult play the child woodpecker Quill, the role was instead given to producer David K. Lovegren's daughter Kathryn. The Edwards brothers, Leech, and producer Preston Stutzman all took on roles as well. Wanting to do one of the voices in his movie and having watched a lot of squirrels, Cory took on the role of Twitchy, and Pro Tools was used to speed up the recording of his dialogue by 50 percent. Todd played the local Sandwich Man, Leech played both Det. Bill Stork and Glen, and Stutzman played Timmy.

As the producers gained greater confidence in the film, however, larger name actors were brought in. Patrick Warburton was the first celebrity actor to join the film and did so purely out of a love for the script. Though Cory Edwards had originally envisioned the Wolf as sounding like a mixture between a young Chevy Chase and Bill Murray, he praised Warburton's performance, saying that he "made the Wolf his own character." Warburton, who had past experience in voice acting from Buzz Lightyear of Star Command and The Emperor's New Groove (2000), found funny Edwards' idea to voice the Wolf as an investigative reporter who fancied himself like Chevy Chase's Fletch character, so he decided to voice the Wolf dryly and inquisitively. Andy Dick also joined the cast early on, to voice Boingo. He used improvisation and approached the role differently from how it had been written, interpreting the character as victimized and unstable. The filmmakers were enthusiastic over Dick's angle on the character, and Todd Edwards said, "What we had written was kind of stock, to be honest, but Andy Dick, well, where he was supposed to laugh, he'd be crying. Where he was supposed to yell, he'd be laughing. He just mixed it up!" Prolific voice performers Tara Strong, David Ogden Stiers, Cameron Barr and Tom Kenny were cast in multiple roles. Strong was cast as Red and Zorra, Stiers was cast as Kirk, the Woodsman and Nicky Flippers, and Kenny was cast as Tommy and Woolworth the Sheep. Emmy-winning actress Sally Struthers was brought in to play Granny Puckett and Joel McCrary was cast as Chief Grizzly.

=== Animation ===
I'll be real honest, there are many, many shots that I wince at when I see them, because it's not my standard of excellence. I know they could be better, but there comes a time at the end of the day where we just had to give up on some things. So to hear critics and people on the internet, like, ranting about it, we all want to yell back and go, "We know! We know it's bad! But this is what we could do!" And the fact that the film is successful in spite of that is really cool, because it basically says to the industry, not to continue to make poorly animated films, but to say, "Look at what the story and the charming characters did; they were able to surpass the bad animation and the technical problems."

— Cory Edwards, director of Hoodwinked!, on the quality of the film's animation.

The film's animation was created in Alias Maya, and to save costs, was produced in Manila, Philippines. Producers Sue Bea Montgomery and David K. Lovegren founded the animation studio Digital Eye Candy for the purpose of the film's production and stationed it in a 5,000-square-foot rented house. Cory Edwards traveled to this studio a total of fifteen times over the course of the film's three-year production and has explained that although the house was located in an expensive part of Manila, the rent was no more than that of his two-bedroom apartment in Los Angeles. When Cory was not able to be on site, Todd took over directing duties. "Along with Tony, we were kind of a 'three-headed monster,'" Cory explains. "We all knew what movie we were making, and I trusted those guys to make creative calls when I couldn't be there." Lovegren had attempted to start an independent animation studio in the Philippines before in 2001, but the studio, called ImagineAsia, was closed after it failed to attract business. Digital Eye Candy hired approximately twenty animators that had previously been employed by ImagineAsia, and at one point the studio reached fifty employees.

The film's animators had little experience with computer-animation and feature-length films and had to be trained by the producers over the course of the film's production. Since none of the animators were specialists, they were not divided into specific teams, but instead each worked on all areas of the animating process. The filmmakers found this to be a poor method though, because it kept the individual skills of the animators from being optimized. Due to their independent backgrounds, the animators were accustomed to working at fast paces, and despite their small numbers, each phase of production was able to be completed within a short period of time. Still, schedule and budget restraints led the filmmakers to enlist Prana Studios in Mumbai, India to perform visual effects, lighting, and compositing.

The filmmakers found that the most difficult aspect of producing the film independently was their inability to fix all of the mistakes made in the film's animation. Todd Edwards explained that "it becomes an equation: 'I have 10 things that I would like to change in this shot. I have the time and the budget to do three. Pick those three and then let's move on.' And that was hard to do". Another obstacle during the film's production, according to Cory Edwards, was putting fur on the animal characters. It took the filmmakers three and a half years to work out a method to do so perfectly, forcing themselves to redesign and reanimate several aspects.

Knowing that they could not match the quality of other computer-animated films, the film was instead designed to imitate the look of stop motion. Cory Edwards cited Rankin-Bass as an inspiration and explained, "If we approach our look like that—photographed miniatures in stop motion—and if that nostalgia resonates with our audience as far as that look, then we're not going to shoot ourselves in the foot trying to put every freckle and hair on photoreal creatures." Edwards contrasted the technically innovative, but critically panned Howard the Duck (1986) with the simple, but beloved puppet character Kermit the Frog to illustrate to his crew the importance of well-written, likeable characters over technical quality.

Distancing the film from what producer Preston Stutzman called the "candy-coated, brightly colored pastel world[s]" of other CG animated films, an attempt was made to bring an organic look to the film, and “dirt” was rubbed into the colors. The Nightmare Before Christmas (1993) was cited as an inspiration for the filmmakers to try to bend the characters' shapes into extremes, and many other choices unconventional to computer-animated films were also made. For example, one of the Woodsman's eyes was made bigger than the other, and Red was given only four fingers, so as to make her look more like a doll. Producer Katie Hooten explained that "CG in the past has been pushing the envelope to make things look more realistic, but Hoodwinked takes things back to where CG looks a lot more like a cartoon."

=== Music ===
The original score is composed by John Mark Painter, from the rock duo Fleming and John, which consisted of him and his wife Fleming McWilliams. The 1960s inspired score was recorded in Nashville, Tennessee, and orchestrated and conducted by Kristin Wilkinson. Todd Edwards wrote nine original songs, to replace Painter's score, in order to appeal older audiences. The songs were performed by cast member Anne Hathaway, along with Ben Folds, Ely Buendia and Todd Edwards himself. The soundtrack was distributed by Rykodisc and released on December 13, 2005.

=== Distribution ===
Sally Struthers was the original Granny for two years of the project. She did a fantastic voice. When Glenn Close walked in, she said, 'Why do you need me? Sally did a great job.' I didn't want to say 'because Harvey made us.' I'm friends with Sally through some other people – I ended up writing her a nice note ... Sally did more of a southern, battleaxe granny, Glenn's was more a prim and proper one.

— Cory Edwards, director of Hoodwinked!, on the recasting of Sally Struthers.

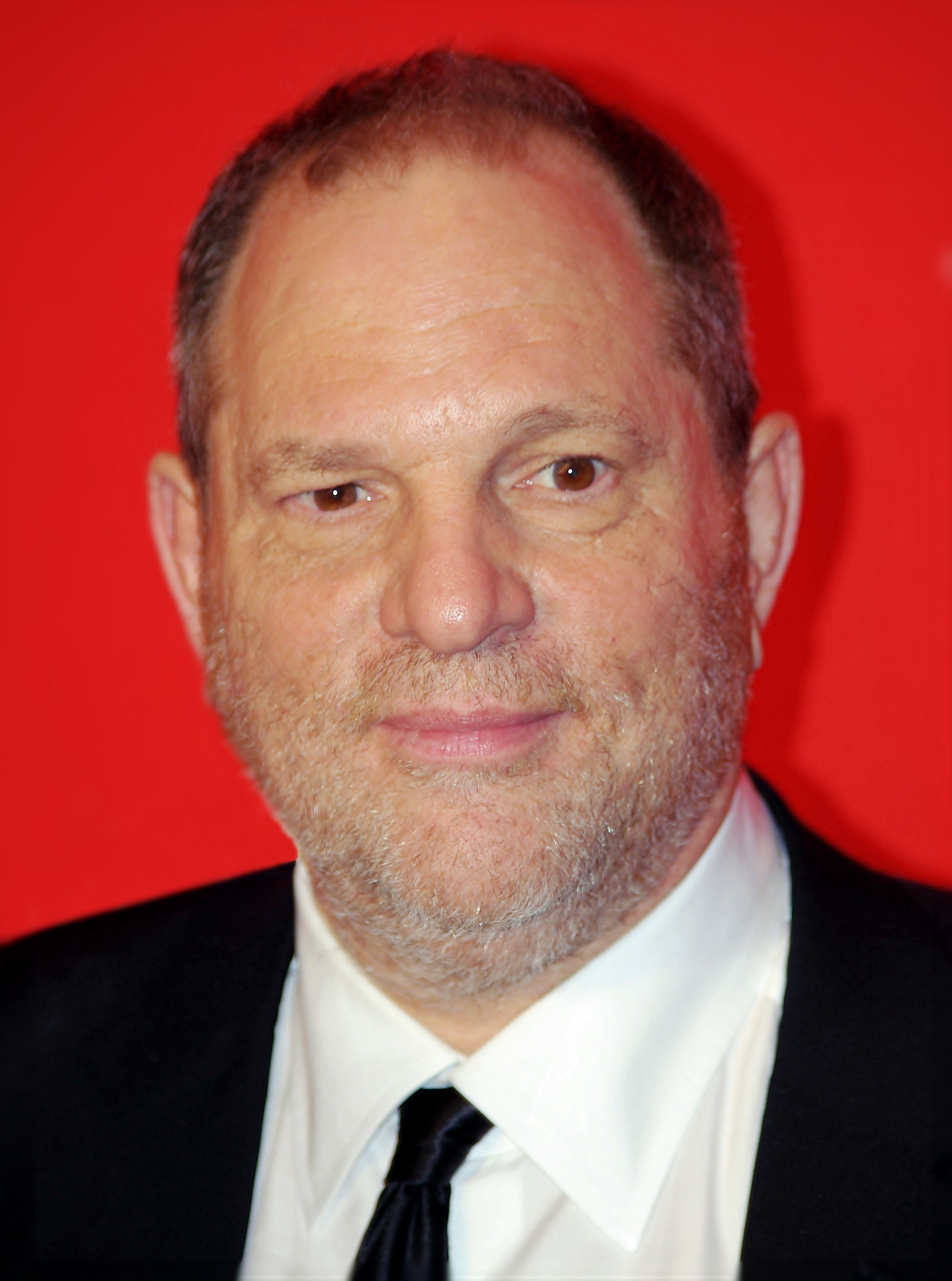
Harvey (pictured here in 2011) and Bob Weinstein distributed Hoodwinked! as one of the Weinstein Company's first films.

Hoodwinked! was shown to potential distributors throughout various stages of its production. Though a distribution offer was made by DreamWorks Pictures, it was turned down as the filmmakers did not feel that it was a good deal. As the film neared the end of production, it was screened at the Cannes Film Festival. Harvey and Bob Weinstein were also at the festival at the time, screening Robert Rodriguez's film Sin City (2005), which they were distributing through their then newly formed studio, the Weinstein Company. They decided to pick Hoodwinked! up for distribution after it was brought to their attention by Rodriguez's wife, whose attorney also happened to work for Blue Yonder Films. Although Cory Edwards did not meet Rodriguez, he acknowledged him as instrumental to get the film made.

The Weinsteins had recently left the Walt Disney Company and according to Cory Edwards, they "loved the idea of picking up an animated film and giving Disney a run for their money". The involvement of the Weinstein Company encouraged Kanbar enough to enlist Skywalker Sound. The film was nearly complete by the time that the Weinsteins became involved, and Edwards has stated that nothing was done by them to ruin "the original vision of the movie." However, a few edit suggestions were made to quicken the film's pace which Edwards felt were good ideas, as he considered the first twenty minutes to be dragging.

The Weinstein Company also heavily recast the film with bigger-name actors in the hopes of attracting a larger audience. Anne Hathaway replaced Tara Strong in the lead role of Red; Jim Belushi replaced David Ogden Stiers in the role of Kirk, the Woodsman; Anthony Anderson replaced Tony Leech in the role of Det. Bill Stork; Glenn Close replaced Sally Struthers in the role of Granny Puckett; Xzibit replaced Joel McCrary in the role of Chief Grizzly and Chazz Palminteri replaced Tom Kenny in the role of Woolworth the Sheep. Opining that the final steps in character design were really fleshed out when the actors were hired, Hooten felt that Hathaway put some edge that was missing on Red, making her more sarcastic, sassy and quick. Anderson accepted the role of Bill Stork given his past experience as voice actor and his previous collaborations with the Weinsteins in Scary Movie 3 (2003) and My Baby's Daddy (2004), wanting to do something that his children and godchildren could watch and enjoy. Palminteri was called to be offered the part of Woolworth the Sheep, which he accepted as he found the script hilarious. Despite these recastings, Strong retained the much smaller role of Zorra, Stiers retained the role of Nicky Flippers, Kenny retained the role of Tommy and Leech retained the role of Glen. Many high-profile country singers were considered to replace Benjy Gaither in the role of Japeth, but none of them were available and Gaither retained the role. The Weinsteins also wanted to replace Joshua J. Greene in the role of Jimmy Lizard with a more famous actor such as Albert Brooks, but the role was ultimately not recast. Edwards appreciated the reason for the recastings and attributed a large part of the film's financial success to them. He expressed disappointment about the amount of recasting, however, saying, "At a certain point it became Recast-o-Rama, everybody got recast-happy. My feeling is, you get two or three names on that poster, you're fine. Our Hoodwinked poster has like a paragraph of names on it. After a certain point, I don't think you need more than two, three celebrities—give it to the voice actors. It sweetens the pot". Since the film's animation had already been mostly completed by the time the recastings were made, the new actors had to deliver their lines exactly as the old actors had done, giving them no opportunity to improvise. Edwards expressed disappointment with the fact that the original actors would not get any credit for their improvisations in the film, which were copied by the replacement actors.

== Release ==
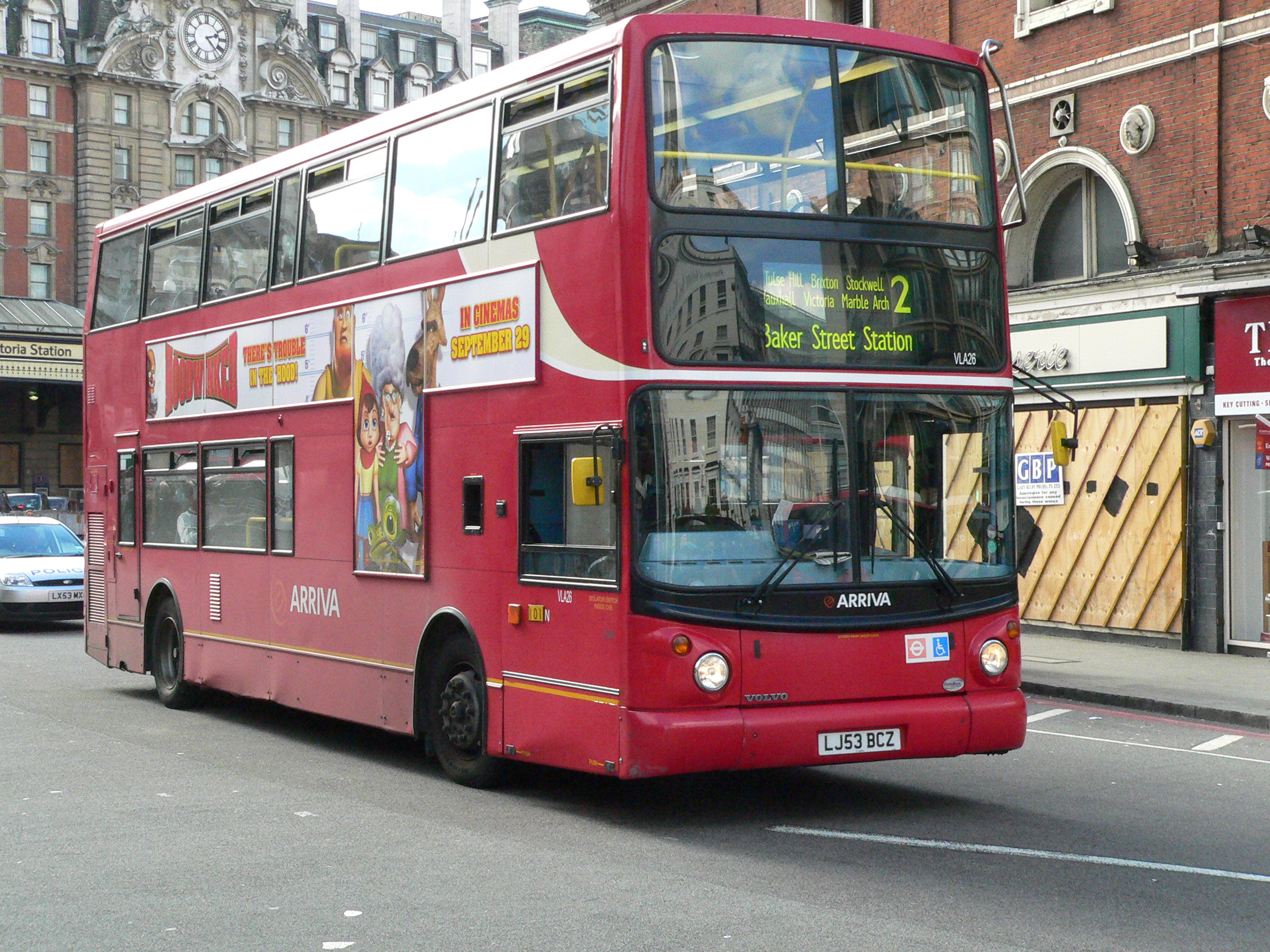
A bus advertising the film in London

Hoodwinked! received a one-week, limited release in Los Angeles on December 16, 2005 to qualify for Oscar consideration. A nationwide U.S. release was scheduled for Christmas Day 2005, but it was moved to January 13, 2006 to avoid competition with other films released during the holiday season.

=== Home media ===
Hoodwinked! was released on DVD on May 2, 2006 and on Blu-ray and DVD on February 15, 2011. The film was the best-selling DVD in its initial week of release, selling over 700,000 copies and making over $13.5 million. A 22-minute behind-the-scenes video podcast is available for free on iTunes.

In October 2025, after years of unavailability on streaming and rental services, Content Partners, LLC acquired ownership and derivative rights to Hoodwinked! and Hoodwinked Too! Hood vs. Evil from Kanbar Entertainment, licensing North American distribution rights to Sony Pictures and international rights to TWC's successor-in-interest Lionsgate.

=== Streaming ===
Hoodwinked became available to stream on Tubi in the United States on March 1, 2026 under Sony Pictures Television.

As of June 1, 2026 Lionsgate has released the film on Lionsgate+ in Prime Video in the Netherlands and New Zealand with more territories to come.

== Reception ==
=== Box office ===
In its opening four-day weekend, Hoodwinked! grossed $16,879,402 in 2,394 theaters in the United States, ranking No. 2 at the box office and averaging $7,050 per venue. It fell $50,000 short of Glory Road, which took the box office's number-one spot that week. The film maintained its number-two spot in the box office for its second weekend, dropping 16.1 percent, and placed in the top ten for a total of five weeks. At the end of its theatrical run it had grossed a total of $110,013,167 worldwide—$51,386,611 in the United States and $58,626,556 in other territories.

=== Critical response ===
Hoodwinked! received mixed reviews from critics. On Rotten Tomatoes, the film has a rating of 47%, based on 124 reviews, with an average rating of 5.6/10. The site's consensus reads, "This fractured fairytale doesn't have the wit or animation quality to compete with the likes of the Shrek franchise." On Metacritic, it received a score of 45 out of 100, based on 29 critics, indicating "mixed or average" reviews. Audiences polled by CinemaScore gave the film an average grade of "B+" on an A+ to F scale.

James Berardinelli of ReelViews gave the film two-and-a-half stars out of four and claimed that many of the film's ideas for altering its familiar storyline "sound better on paper than they turn out in execution." Finding it tedious to view the film's story told multiple times, he wrote that the film "slips into boredom." Bruce Westbrook of the Houston Chronicle also gave the film two-and-a-half stars, and although he praised its "snappy dialogue and fresh characterizations", he considered the film's plot underdeveloped and characters lacking in motivation. Peter Rainer writing for The Christian Science Monitor gave the film a C+ and called it "a moderately enjoyable escapade that isn't quite clever enough for adults and not quite imaginative enough for children." He was not overly critical of the film, but felt that it was a disappointment in comparison to the high standards for computer-animated films set by Pixar. Jami Bernard of the New York Daily News suggested that timelessness is a necessary component of an animated classic, and faulted the film for its attempt to be hip and current. While Ty Burr of The Boston Globe praised the film's vocal performances, he wrote, "Hoodwinked never builds to a level of sustained comic mania ... One aches to think what the great Looney Tunes directors could have done with this material."

Several critics, however, were more enthusiastic about the film. Owen Gleiberman of Entertainment Weekly gave Hoodwinked! an A− and praised the zaniness of its humor. Calling the filmmakers heroes, he compared them to Quentin Tarantino and Steven Soderbergh due to their potential for bringing independent filmmaking to prominence in animation. Although Nancy Churnin of the Dallas Morning News considered the film inferior to those of Pixar and DreamWorks, she still gave it a B and wrote, "it's got an upstart charm, a clever premise, appealing characters voiced by a terrific cast and a script that should make you laugh out loud more than once." In his review for the Chicago Tribune, Michael Wilmington praised the film's voice cast, music, and script, and wrote, "it packs more verbal wit and surprise than the usual cartoon." Kevin Thomas of the Los Angeles Times gave it three-and-a-half stars out of five calling it "high-energy, imaginative entertainment".

Japeth was praised amongst both positive and negative reviews. Gleiberman and Churnin both felt that the character was one of the best parts of the film, and Westbrook and Wilmington both described him as "a hoot". In a mostly positive review for the Orlando Sentinel, Roger Moore called the character hilarious, while in a mostly negative review for Variety, Justin Chang wrote that the character "steals the show every minute he's onscreen."

One of the main criticisms of the film was the poor quality of its animation. Berardinelli called it some of the worst CGI animation in memory. He felt that the characters looked plastic, considered the backgrounds dull, and wrote, "On more than one occasion, I thought I was watching something made for TV. When compared to today's visual standards for animated films, Hoodwinked is far below the curve." Burr considered the film's surfaces poorly rendered and compared them to "Teletubbieland reupholstered with Naugahyde." Westbrook felt that the animation worked well for the animal characters, but wrote, "the humans have a glassy sheen and brittle hardness, much like work done in the early days of CG ... That art has come too far to embrace a throwback like Hoodwinked as lovably quaint. It's simply dated." Stephen Hunter of The Washington Post compared the characters to rubber toys, and wrote, "their faces are without nuance or vividness ... In movement, especially, do they lack grace and conviction. It seems like the recent breakthroughs in computerized magic have bypassed the poor Edwards fellows, as it looks stuck somewhere in the 1970s, or maybe even earlier."

Many reviews negatively compared the film to the Shrek series. Liam Lacey of The Globe and Mail considered the film to be "a sort of discount Shrek", while Burr called it "Shrek with added drek." Westbrook wrote that "Echoing such a popular predecessor as Shrek is not a good thing—especially when the echo is so faint." Berardinelli felt that the fairy tale references were not as smartly done as in the first Shrek film, while Bernard felt that Hoodwinked! took fairy tale revisionism too far. He felt that the humor in Shrek worked due to the fairy tale characters remaining in character throughout the film, and wrote, "It's pointless to scold them for behaving the way fairy tales intended, and that's far funnier than turning them into breakdancing anachronisms." Bill Muller of The Arizona Republic considered Red's kung fu abilities to be overly similar to Princess Fiona's "Matrix agility." Gleiberman also noted the similarities between the film and Shrek, but he was positive in the comparison, feeling that its independent production gave the filmmakers "the freedom to follow their flakiest corkscrew whims." While Wilmington did not find Hoodwinked! as impressive or beguiling as Shrek, he wrote that "when it's cooking, it does make you laugh."

Retrospectively, several critics noted that the film was considerably better than the 2007 animated fairy tale parody film Happily N'Ever After. Although Burr had given Hoodwinked! a negative review, he likened the film to Citizen Kane in comparison to Happily N'Ever After. Wilmington also considered Hoodwinked! the superior of the two films. While Christy Lemire of the Associated Press likened Hoodwinked! to a poor man's Shrek, she went on to call Happily N'Ever After a poor man's Hoodwinked!

In 2018, Richard Brody of The New Yorker called Hoodwinked! one of the top independent films for families. Acknowledging the crudeness of the animation, he nonetheless praised the writing as "bold and funny" and wrote that the direction "displays admirable comic timing." Brody considered the character personalities distinct from those in other animated comedies. He also commended the vocal performances for having a "zippy, brash energy that doesn't feel condescending". Hoodwinked! has also been praised by Tony Bancroft, who co-directed Mulan.

Hoodwinked! received a Saturn Award nomination for Best Animated Film at the Academy of Science Fiction, Fantasy and Horror Films, but lost to Corpse Bride. Entertainment Weekly ranked the film as number ten on "The Must List" for its January 27, 2006 issue, calling it a "genre-busting indie animated gem."

== Analysis ==
In February 2006, author Timothy Sexton wrote an article titled "Hoodwinked: A Postmodern Examination of the Dangers of Runaway Capitalism" for Associated Content, in which he posited that Hoodwinked! was one of the first postmodern animated films and that the film also carried political undertones. He argued that the relative nature of truth was shown by revealing deviations from the original fairy tale as the film explored the story from each of the central characters' points of view. Calling Hoodwinked! "the most subversive movie released nationwide since Fahrenheit 9/11", Sexton went on to interpret the film as a critique on the free enterprise system. He drew comparisons between the film's villain and the typical American business owner, going so far as to say that the character was "clearly based on people like Bill Gates and Sam Walton". In Sexton's view, the film exposed the flaws of capitalism, showing that if left unregulated, business owners will establish monopolies and eliminate competition.

The film's director and co-writer Cory Edwards was surprised by Sexton's interpretation and denied that the film intentionally carried any political messages. He explained that he and the other filmmakers were simply drawing from the evil schemes common of James Bond films, Bugs Bunny cartoons, and The A-Team, and wrote "If Mr. Sexton sees my movie as a sermon against mega-corporations monopolizing America, that's fine. But our villain is just as easily the face of every dictator in history, or every schoolyard bully who is compensating for low self-esteem, or any Mafia boss who dominates by either absorbing or wiping out his competition. Hey, if you look at an abstract painting and see the devil in a red splotch, that's your prerogative ... I guess a movie's message is only partially supplied by the filmmaker."

In May 2007 Time magazine ran an article by James Poniewozik titled "Is Shrek Bad for Kids?" which considered the negative effects on children of being raised with fairy tale satires, instead of the original stories. Poniewozik mentioned Hoodwinked! writing, "I thought Hoodwinked! and most of the Shrek series were hilarious ... But even if you ultimately reject their messages, old-school fairy tales are part of our cultural vocabulary. There's something a little sad about kids growing up in a culture where their fairy tales come pre-satirized, the skepticism, critique and revision having been done for them by the mama birds of Hollywood." Cory Edwards wrote into the magazine, expressing his similar sentiments and writing, "As the writer-director of Hoodwinked, it may surprise you that I couldn't agree more with James Poniewozik's article. Even as I was making the film, I asked myself the same question: Are we parodying something that kids should have the chance to experience first, 'un-parodied?' We went to great lengths to distance our film from Shrek's humor (and no, I don't think Shrek considers kids). I would hope that Hoodwinked and its sequels will be seen as trying to do something genuine with its characters, rather than look for the next joke at the expense of innocence. We ALL need the real folklore of fairytales, whether we admit it or not."

== Sequel ==
A sequel, Hoodwinked Too! Hood vs. Evil, was released on April 29, 2011. It was first announced in January 2006 and in February, Cory Edwards, Todd Edwards, and Tony Leech explained that although they would be writing the screenplay, they would not return to direct. Cory Edwards later elaborated on this decision, explaining that he had a negative experience working with some of the first film's "key players" and felt that he had been poorly treated by them. He also cited concerns over being confined to animation, and stated that he felt it would be a lateral move to direct a sequel to his first film as his second film. In March 2007, Edwards announced that Mike Disa had been hired to direct the sequel and expressed enthusiasm over his involvement, saying that he "has a real passion for the film and a devotion to maintaining the Hoodwinked world. He wants to do the sequel justice and he really gets what we're trying to do." Although much of the first film's cast returned for the sequel, Anne Hathaway was replaced by Hayden Panettiere in the role of Red and Jim Belushi was replaced by Martin Short in the role of Kirk the Woodsman.

Kanbar Entertainment initially intended to finance production of the sequel independently as it had done with the first film, but entered into a co-financing agreement proposed by The Weinstein Company. The film was initially scheduled to be released on January 15, 2010, but in December 2009, The Weinstein Company postponed the film's release date indefinitely. In April 2010, Kanbar Entertainment brought a lawsuit against The Weinstein Company. In addition to claiming that the postponement of the film's release date breached an agreement between the two companies, the lawsuit accused the Weinstein Company of not contributing to monthly production accounts after February 2009, neglecting to consult Kanbar Entertainment of a release strategy, and not responding to proposed changes to the film, even though Kanbar Entertainment held "final authority on production decisions".

The film was a financial failure, earning $23.1 million worldwide; less than its budget. Critical reception to the film was almost universally negative, with a Rotten score of 11% across 61 reviews on Rotten Tomatoes and a score of 20/100 on Metacritic. Cory Edwards expressed disappointment with the finished film, indicating that it was heavily altered from the original script and saying that it was "deflating to give this thing away and watch others run with it in ways I would not."
