= Cameron Buchanan =

Cameron Buchanan may refer to:

- Cameron Buchanan (footballer) (1928–2008), Scottish footballer
- Cameron Buchanan (politician) (1946–2023), Scottish politician
- Cameron Buchanan, discoverer of Mount Gabi
