= Cameron Thompson =

Cameron Thompson may refer to:

- Cameron Thompson (politician) (born 1960), Australian politician
- Cameron Thompson (American politician), American politician
- Cameron Thompson (footballer) (born 2000), English professional footballer

== See also ==
- Cam Thomas (disambiguation)
