= Camryn =

Camryn is a given name of Scottish origin. Notable people with the name include:

== Women ==
- Camryn (singer) (1999–2025), American pop singer
- Camryn Biegalski (born 1998), American professional soccer player
- Camryn Garrett (born 2000), American writer
- Camryn Grimes (born 1990), American actress
- Camryn Lancaster (born 2003), American professional soccer player
- Debra Camryn Manheim (born 1961), American actress
- Camryn Newton-Smith (born 2000), Australian pentathlete and heptathlete
- Camryn Rogers (born 1999), Canadian hammer thrower
- Camryn Taylor (born 2000), American Women's National Basketball Association player
- Camryn Wong (born 2000), Canadian ice hockey player

== Men ==
- Camryn Bynum (born 1998), American National Football League player

== Fictional characters ==
- Camryn Barnes, from the television film Twitches
- Camryn Coyle, from the Netflix original series Project Mc²

== See also ==
- Cameron (given name)
