= Alasdair Boyle =

Scotland international rugby union player

Alasdair Hugh Wilson Boyle (born Glasgow, 30 September 1945 (age 79)) was a Scottish rugby union player. He played as a number eight.

He also played for London Scottish FC.

He had 6 caps for Scotland, from 1966 to 1968, scoring 1 try, 3 points on aggregate. He played in two Five Nations Championship competitions, in 1966 and 1967.

His brother Cameron Boyle was also capped for Scotland.
