= Camron =

Camron is a first name and a last name. Notable people with these names include:

== First name ==
- Cam'ron (Cameron Giles, born 1976), American rapper
- Camron Johnson (born 1999), American football player

== Last name ==
- Leo Camron (1916–2007), South African-Israeli educator

== See also ==
- Cameron (given name)
- Cameron (surname)
