= Kammy =

Kammy may refer to:

- Chris Kamara (born 1957), English former footballer and manager
- Kamryn Belle, singer
- Kammy Koopa, a character in the Mario franchise
- Kammy, a character in the Ojarumaru anime series
