= Cameron Williams (disambiguation) =

Cameron Williams is an Australian television journalist and presenter.

Cameron Williams may also refer to:

- Cameron Williams (cricketer) (born 1991), Australian cricketer
- Cameron Williams (American football) (born 2003), American football player
- Cameron Williams (basketball) (born 2007), American basketball player
- Cameron "Buck" Williams, Left Behind character
