= Kameron (given name) =

Kameron is a given name. Notable people with the given name include:

- Kameron Alexander (born 1988), American singer, songwriter and record producer
- Kameron Canaday (born 1993), American football player
- Kameron Chancellor (born 1988), American football player
- Kameron Chatman (born 1996), American basketball player
- Kameron Cline (born 1998), American football player
- Kameron Edwards (born 1996), American basketball player
- Kameron Fox (born 1977), Bermudian cricketer
- Kameron Hankerson, American basketball player
- Kameron Hurley, American writer
- Kameron Johnson (born 2002), American football player
- Kameron Kelly (born 1996), American football player
- Kameron Langley (born 1999), American basketball player
- Kameron Loe (born 1981), American baseball player
- Kameron Marlowe (born 1997), American country singer
- Kameron Michaels (born 1986), American drag performer
- Kameron Mickolio (born 1984), American baseball player
- Kameron Misner (born 1998), American baseball player
- Kameron Pearce-Paul (born 1997), English rugby league player
- Kameron Taylor (born 1994), American basketball player for Maccabi Tel Aviv in the Israeli Basketball Premier League and the EuroLeague

== See also ==
- Cameron
