= Cameron Williams (cricketer) =

Australian cricketer (born 1991)

Personal information
- Full name: Cameron Dean Williams
- Born: 18 November 1991 (age 34); Adelaide, Australia
- Batting: Right-handed
- Bowling: Right-arm Leg break
- Role: Bowler

Domestic team information
- Years: Team
- 2011/12: South Australia

Career statistics
Competition	FC
Matches	1
Runs scored	22
Batting average	22.00
100s/50s	0/0
Top score	18*
Balls bowled	118
Wickets	1
Bowling average	130.00
5 wickets in innings	0
10 wickets in match	0
Best bowling	1/92
Catches/stumpings	0/–
- Source: ESPNcricinfo, 10 March 2024

Cameron Dean Williams (born 18 November 1991) is an Australian cricketer. He played in one first-class match for South Australia in 2012.

== See also ==
- List of South Australian representative cricketers
