= Sue Bea Montgomery =

American film producer

- Born: Sue Bea Belknap; 1958 (age 67–68)
- Occupation: Film producer

Sue Bea Montgomery (born 1958) is an American film producer from Tulsa, Oklahoma. After serving as an associate producer on the 1999 Independent film Chillicothe, she introduced the film's director Todd Edwards and his brother Cory Edwards to entrepreneur and inventor Maurice Kanbar, who had invested in the film. Kanbar agreed to finance the brothers to direct an animated film, based on a well known fairy tale, and they came up with Hoodwinked, a unique retelling of Little Red Riding Hood. To produce the film, Montgomery and Kanbar founded Kanbar Entertainment and Kanbar Animation in 2002. To save costs, the film's animation was produced in Manila, Philippines, which made it the first independent computer-animated film to be produced in the Philippines. The film was also one of the first computer-animated films to be completely independently funded. Hoodwinked! was released in 2005, receiving mixed reviews, and earning over $110 million worldwide. Montgomery served as a producer on two PBS Kids series; Sid the Science Kid from 2008 to 2009 and Dinosaur Train from 2009 to 2010. She was nominated for a Daytime Emmy award in the category of Outstanding Children's Animated Program for her work on Dinosaur Train. She has also worked on a number of other well known films, including Ironweed, The Shawshank Redemption, Air Force One, and Atlantis: The Lost Empire.

== Filmography ==
Year	Title	Notes
1983	The Outsiders	production assistant (uncredited)
1987	Light of Day	assistant: Mr. Claybourne, location publicity assistant (as Sue Bea Belknap)
1987	Ironweed	assistant: Mr. Babenco, post-production supervisor (as Sue Bea Belknap)
1988	The Wonder Years (unknown episodes)	assistant to producers
1989	Great Balls of Fire!	assistant: Mr. McBride (as Sue Bea Belknap)
1990	The Wonder Years (Growing Up)	associate producer (as Sue Bea Belknap)
1990	The Wonder Years (Ninth Grade Man)	associate producer (as Sue Bea Belknap)
1991	The Wonder Years (The Accident)	associate producer
1993	In the Line of Fire	production secretary
1994	The Shawshank Redemption	production supervisor
1995	Empire Records	production coordinator (uncredited)
1996	Tin Cup	production office coordinator
1996	My Fellow Americans	production coordinator (uncredited)
1997	Air Force One	production coordinator
1999	Mutual Love Life	producer
2001	Atlantis: The Lost Empire	post-production manager
2003	The Bus Stops Here	co-producer
2003	A Bear's Story	executive producer
2005	Hoodwinked!	producer
2008–2009	Sid the Science Kid	producer
2009–2010	Dinosaur Train	producer
