= Cameron Mitchell =

Cameron Mitchell may refer to:

- Cameron Mitchell (actor) (1918–1994), American actor
- Cameron Mitchell (singer) (born 1989), American singer-songwriter
- Cameron Mitchell (American football) (born 2001), American football player
- Cameron Mitchell (Stargate), a fictional character in the series Stargate SG-1

== See also ==
- Cameron Mitchell Restaurants, a restaurant company headquartered in Columbus, Ohio
- John Cameron Mitchell (born 1963), American actor, playwright, screenwriter, and director
