= Cam Thomas (disambiguation) =

Cam Thomas (born 2001) is an American basketball player.

Cam or Cameron Thomas may also refer to:

- Cameron Thomas (politician) (born 1982), British politician
- Cam Thomas (defensive tackle) (born 1986), American football player
- Cam Thomas (cornerback) (born 1991), American football player
- Cameron Thomas (defensive end) (born 2000), American football player

== See also ==
- Thomas Cameron (1894–1980), Canadian veterinarian and parasitologist
- Cameron Thompson (disambiguation)
