= Cameron Davis =

Cameron Davis may refer to:

- Cameron Davis (attorney) (born 1964), American environmental policy expert and lawyer
- Cameron Davis (golfer) (born 1995), Australian golfer
- Cameron Josiah Davis (1873–1952), American Episcopal priest
- Cameron Davis (Days of Our Lives), a fictional character on Days of our Lives

== See also ==
- Cameron Davies, leader of the Republican Party of Alberta
- Davis Cameron, comic character
