= Cameron Rokhsar =

Dermatologist

Cameron K. Rokhsar is an associate clinical professor of dermatology at Mount Sinai Hospital and the founder and medical director of the New York Cosmetic, Skin, and Laser Surgery Center. He is a fellowship-trained cosmetic and mohs surgeon, a specialist in laser surgery including laser resurfacing and laser treatment of wrinkles and scars.

He completed undergraduate studies at Harvard University (1994) and attended the New York University School of Medicine (1998). After an internship at Lenox Hill Hospital (1999), he completed a dermatology residency at Albert Einstein College of Medicine.

Rokhsar co-reported in 2005 on a treatment of melasma with Fraxel in The Treatment of Melasma with Fractional Photothermolysis: A Pilot Study. He has published articles on Fraxel and Laser Resurfacing, and co-published an article evaluating the effects of nasal fillers in nasal contouring.
