= Cam Kirk =

American photographer

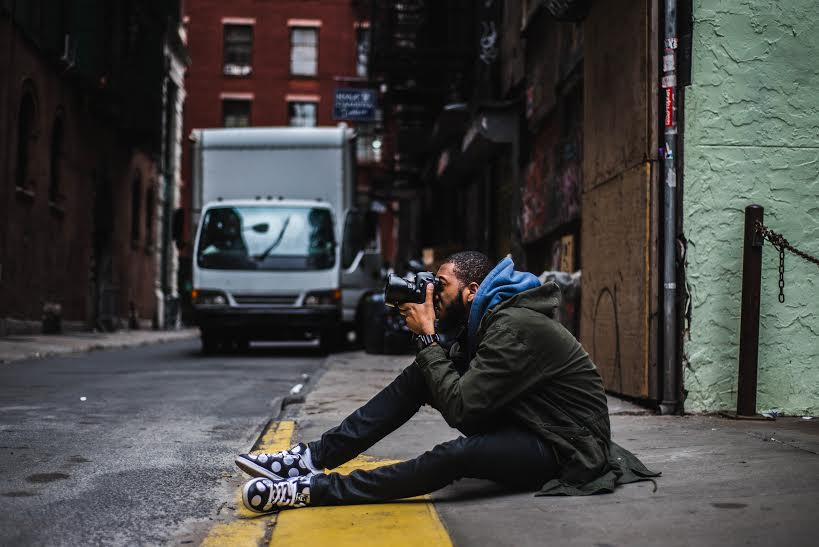
- Born: February 27, 1989 (age 37); Maryland
- Education: Morehouse College
- Occupations: Photographer and videographer
- Website: thecamkirk.com

Cameron "Cam Kirk" Kirkland (born February 27, 1989) is a photographer and videographer. Cam Kirk has worked with and produced work for many hip hop artists and entertainers, including Young Jeezy, T.I., Monica, 2 Chainz, Mike Will Made It, Estelle, Schoolboy Q, Future, Gucci Mane, D.C. Young Fly, Young Dolph, Yo Gotti, and DJ Khaled.

== Early life and education ==
Cam Kirk was born and raised in Prince George's County, Maryland with his three siblings and parents. There he attended Bishop McNamara High School. During his youth, Cam Kirk was inspired by his father's passion for photography as he allowed Kirk to assist him with his projects. After graduating high school in 2007, Cam Kirk moved to Atlanta, Georgia. Upon arriving to Atlanta, Cam Kirk attended Morehouse College where he majored in Business Marketing. While in Atlanta, Cam Kirk focused on his true passion, photography and videography.

== Career ==
Cam Kirk's work has been published in a variety of magazines which include: Billboard Magazine, XXL, The Source, The Fader Magazine, Spin Magazine, MTV, BuzzFeed, Complex Magazine, Pitchfork, Vice Magazine, Revolt TV, BET & More. Complex Magazine named Cam Kirk as one of 15 photographers that every rap fan should know. Hypebeast has also named him Hip Hop's Most Trusted Photographer. In 2016, Atlanta's Largest Radio Station Hot 107.9 invited Cam Kirk as their first ever photographer to be featured and interviewed on the air. In 2017, Cam Kirk was also included in DeLeon Tequila's list of 100 Influencers Taking it to the Next Level.

== Exhibitions ==
=== Trap God ===
In an effort to bridge the gap between Art and Hip Hop, Cam Kirk pioneered the first Trap House photography exhibit, entitled "Trap God". Trap God was a photography exhibit featuring never before seen photographs of rapper Gucci Mane. The exhibit took place in an abandoned church in East Atlanta Village and presented live aspects as a point of innovation and artistry in the exhibit. The live aspects were actual actors posed as Trap Girls, a Trap Queen, a gun & bible wielding Pastor, and much more. The exhibit concluded with rapper Young Thug shooting his music video for the song entitled "Again" at the event. The Trap God Exhibit received national attention and was featured in many major magazines.

=== Day 4 Billboard Exhibit ===
Cam Kirk's "Day 4 Exhibit" launched in Atlanta, Georgia, on April 19, 2016. The exhibit has been updated monthly with unreleased photos of influential artists. The exhibit began by being funded through a Kick Starter campaign giving fans of hip hop and photography alike the opportunity to contribute and be a part of the exhibit directly. The exhibit has spanned to various artists and locations, including Miami, FL.

The first billboard in the Day 4 Exhibit was dedicated to the late, Bankroll Fresh. Cam Kirk linked with friends and super producers Metro Boomin, Sonny Digital and Southside to dedicate a billboard to a fallen friend. Thus far, Cam Kirk has displayed Metro Boomin, 21 Savage, Sonny Digital, Lil Yachty, Rich The Kid, The Migos, Trouble, DC Young Fly, 6lack and displayed clothing of the London-based clothing brand Marbek.

=== Art Basel ===
Art Basel stages art shows for modern and contemporary art and is sited annually in Basel, Switzerland, Miami Beach, Florida and Hong Kong, Japan. Each show has participating galleries, exhibition sectors, artworks and parallel programming produced in collaboration with the host city's local institutions. December 2016, Cam Kirk participated in Art Basel Miami with a collaboration for an event entitled inFocus. Hip Hop Through The Lens of Photography event Curated by Billboard Magazine and 1800 Tequila, alongside a few other photographers. Cam Kirk also brought his Day 4 Billboard Exhibit to Miami displaying the Migos.
