= Cameron Davidson =

American photographer

Cameron Davidson is an American photographer who has photographed on assignment for such publications as Nature Conservancy,Vanity Fair, National Geographic, Smithsonian, WIRED, Preservation, Departures, Smithsonian Air & Space, ESPN The Magazine, Forbes, Virginia Living, Money, Field and Stream and Outside."

Cameron is also known for his corporate and advertising work for these companies: Discovery Communications, Dominion, Ducks Unlimited, Freddie Mac, General Motors, Jeep-Chrysler, KHA, Rocky Mountaineer, SBA, SEIU, Veterans Administration, Visit Alexandria, Virginia Tourism.

He lives in Northern Florida and has a production office in Washington, DC. Cameron grew up in Michigan and the Washington DC region.

== Biography ==
Cameron's career in photography started with a National Geographic contract assignment in the Spring of 1980. He was awarded Environmental Issues award from Nature's Best magazine for his aerial photography of Mountain Top Removal in West Virginia. In 1973 his first photo was published by the Grass Lake News a newspaper in Grass Lake, Michigan. In October 2012 the United States Postal Service have issued a series of stamps focused on aerial and satellite landscapes Earthscapes, with one of the images an aerial of Blackwater Refuge on Maryland's Eastern Shore.

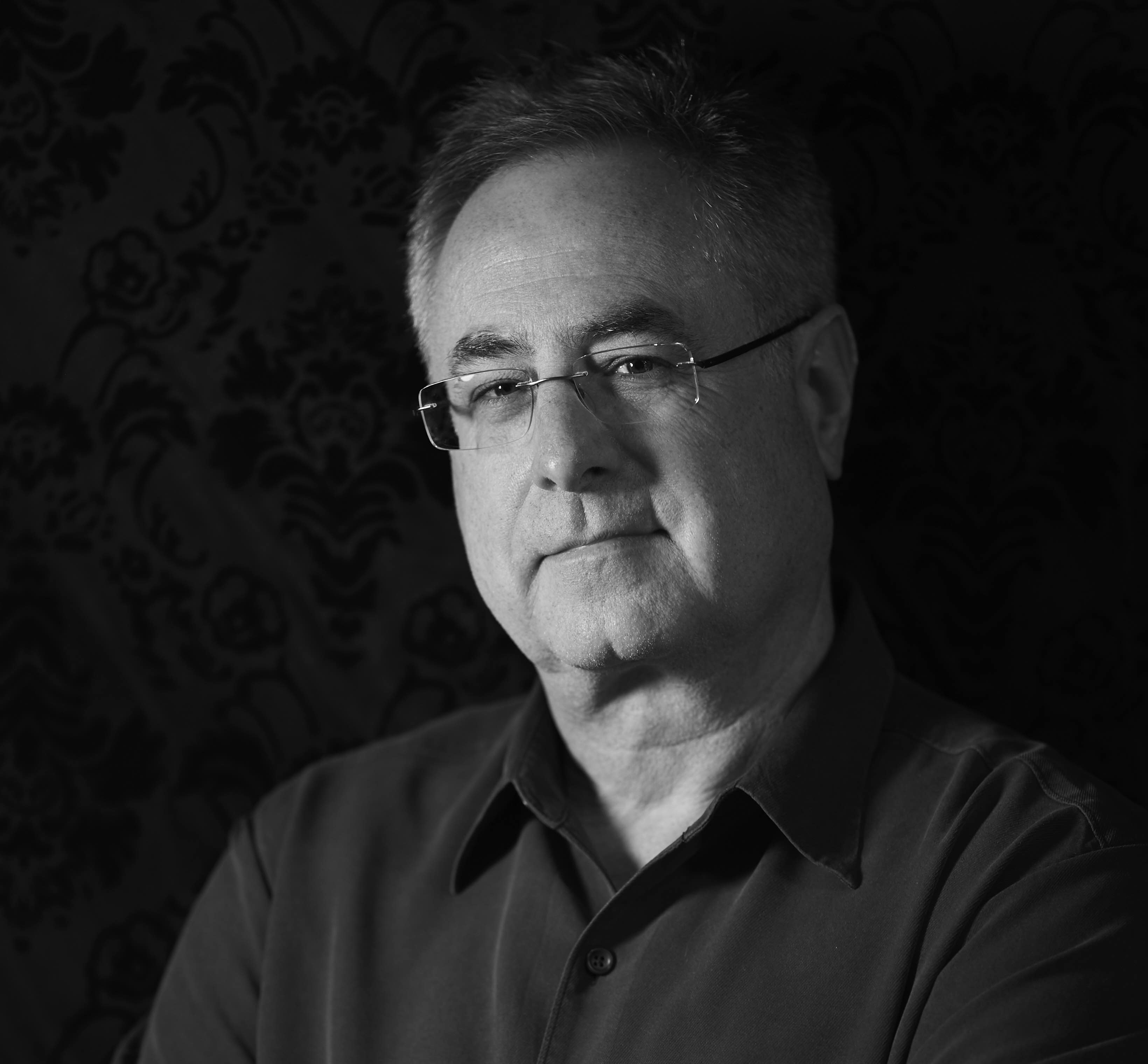

== Publications ==
- Chesapeake: The Aerial Photography of Cameron Davidson text by David Fahrenthold
- Over Florida, Text by Mark Derr, Foreword by Marjory Stoneman Douglas
- Washington D.C.: Our Nation's Capital, Text by Edwards Park
- A Moment of Silence: Arlington National Cemetery text by Owens Andrews
