= Cam Ward =

Cam Ward may refer to:

- Cam Ward (politician) (born 1971), American politician
- Cam Ward (ice hockey) (born 1984), Canadian ice hockey player
- Cam Ward (American football) (born 2002), American football player
