= Kamryn Belle =

Kamryn Bob
- Origin: Suriname
- Occupations: Singer, songwriter, performer
- Website: www.kamrynbelle.com

Kamryn Belle is a singer, songwriter and performer born in Suriname. For the most part she was raised in the Netherlands, where she currently lives. Kamryn is the youngest of six children and comes from a musical family. Her dad was a singer in a band and her three brothers all played an instrument. When she was growing up Kamryn started singing more often and gained more experience. She now writes and records songs in her home studio.

In January 2011 Kamryn, at that time known by the audience as 'Kammy', reached number 7 on the national music chart of Suriname with the song 'Sopi Lobi'. By the end of 2011 she decided to change her style, her name, hired a management team and started working on her first album.

== Most recent ==
Kamryn Belle's debut-album 'Sway' contains a mix of different genres such as roots, jazz and reggae. All eleven songs on 'Sway' are produced, recorded and mixed by Tony Platt, a music producer/engineer best known for his work with artists including AC/DC, Bob Marley and Iron Maiden. All songs on 'Sway' are self-written, except for 'Where Is My Man', which is an Earha Kitt cover.
