= Mount Gabi =

Underwater mountain off the coast of Western Australia

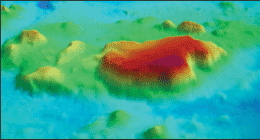
- Survey map that lead to the discovery of Mount Gabi

Highest point
- Elevation: 300 m (980 ft)
- Coordinates: 35°15′0″S 115°07′0″E

Geography
- Location: Sea floor, 50 km (31 mi) from Augusta, Western Australia

Mount Gabi is an underwater mountain, similar to a guyot, that was discovered in 2006, fifty kilometres (31 mi) off the coast of Augusta near the south-western tip of Western Australia. It lies a similar distance west of Windy Harbour

It lies at a depth of one thousand metres (3,300 ft), rising three hundred metres (980 ft) from the sea floor and is five kilometres (3.1 mi) wide.

Mount Gabi was discovered by Cameron Buchanan, a multibeam sonar specialist from Geoscience Australia, the Australian national agency for geoscience research, via swath mapper during investigations of continental shelf processes between the Great Australian Bight and Cape Leeuwin.
