= Cameron Young (disambiguation) =

Cameron Young (born 1997) is an American golfer.

Cameron Young may also refer to:

- Cameron Young (American football) (born 2000), American football player
- Cameron Young (basketball) (born 1996), American basketball player
