= Cameron Murray =

Cameron Murray may refer to:

- Cameron Murray (footballer) (born 1995), footballer
- Cameron Murray (rugby union) (born 1975), Scottish rugby union player
- Cameron Murray (Emmerdale), fictional Emmerdale character
- Cameron Murray (rugby league) (born 1998), Australian rugby league footballer
- Cameron Murray (hurdler) (born 1999), American track and field athlete
