= Cameron Quinn =

American lawyer

Officer for Civil Rights and Civil Liberties at the United States Department of Homeland Security
- Incumbent
- Assumed office September 20, 2017
- President: Donald Trump

Personal details
- Education: University of Florida; University of Virginia; University of Virginia School of Law

Cameron Quinn is an American lawyer, professor, and government official. She was appointed by President Donald Trump as Officer for Civil Rights and Civil Liberties at the United States Department of Homeland Security and took office on September 20, 2017. Quinn previously served in the Office of the Assistant Secretary for Civil Rights at the United States Department of Agriculture, as a senior policy advisor in the Civil Rights Division of the United States Department of Justice, as counsel to the Chairman of the United States Merit Systems Protection Board, and as an assistant attorney general for the Commonwealth of Virginia. She has also served on the Virginia State advisory committee for the United States Commission on Civil Rights.

Quinn has served as Virginia's chief state election official, the United States elections advisor for International Foundation for Electoral Systems, and in the Federal Voting Assistance Program at the United States Department of Defense. She also spent several years in private practice at the law firm of Winston & Strawn. Quinn has taught election law for over a decade at George Mason University's Antonin Scalia Law School.
