= Caz =

Caz or CAZ may refer to:

== Acronym or abbreviation ==
- Cazenovia, New York a town in New York state
  - Cazenovia (village), New York, a village in the Town of Cazenovia
- CAZ, a Clean Air Zone defined to meet air quality law
- CAZ, IATA code for Cobar Airport
- Conservative Alliance of Zimbabwe, a former political party from Zimbabwe

== Name ==
- Arrow Caz!, a Dutch commercial radio station
- Caz the Rabbit, a character from the Spellsinger series
- 24354 Caz, a main-belt minor planet

=== People ===
- Camille Cazedessus Jr., American editor and publisher
- Caz the Clash, former guitarist with the band HorrorPops
- Caz Walton, British Paralympic athlete and team manager
- Grandmaster Caz, American DJ and rapper
- Richard Cazeau, co-host of The Adrenaline Project
