= Cameron Clark =

Cameron Clark may refer to:

- Cameron Clark (American football) (born 1997), American football offensive tackle
- Cameron Clark (basketball) (born 1991), American basketball player
- Cameron Clark (footballer, born 2000), Scottish association football player
- Cameron Clark (rugby union) (born 1993), Australian rugby union sevens player
- Cameron Clark (Hollyoaks), a fictional character from the British soap opera Hollyoaks

== See also ==
- Cam Clarke (born 1957), American voice actor
