= Cameron Smith =

Cameron or Cam Smith may refer to:

- Cammie Smith (Cameron Wilberforce Smith, born 1933), West Indian cricketer
- Cam Smith (artist), British comic book artist
- Cameron Smith (rugby league, born 1983), Australian rugby league footballer
- Cameron Smith (curler) (born 1993), Scottish curler
- Cameron Smith (golfer) (born 1993), Australian golfer
- Cameron Smith (ski mountaineer) (born 1995), American ski mountaineer
- Cammy Smith (Cameron Smith, born 1995), Scottish footballer
- Cameron Smith (linebacker) (born 1997), American football linebacker
- Cameron Smith (rugby league, born 1998), English rugby league footballer
- Cam Smith (cornerback) (born 2000), American football cornerback
- Cam Smith (baseball) (born 2003), American baseball player

== See also ==
- Cameron Smyth (born 1971), American politician
