= Cameron Barr =

Australian rules football umpire

Personal information
- Full name: Cameron Barr
- Other occupation: Business development manager

Umpiring career
Years	League	Role	Games
2016–	AFL	Field umpire	1

Cameron Barr is an Australian rules football umpire currently officiating in the Australian Football League.

Before umpiring in the AFL, he umpired in the North East Australian Football League, officiating in the 2015 and '17 Grand Finals. He was appointed to the AFL umpire rookie list in 2016, and made his debut, as an emergency umpire replacing an injured Troy Pannell, in a match between Sydney and Greater Western Sydney in Round 3, 2018.
