= Cameron Boyle =

Scotland international rugby union player

Cameron "Cammie" Boyle was a Scottish international rugby union player.

He was capped for Scotland three times in 1963. He also played for London Scottish FC.

His brother Alasdair Boyle was also capped for Scotland.
