= Maurice Kanbar =

American entrepreneur and inventor (1930–2022)

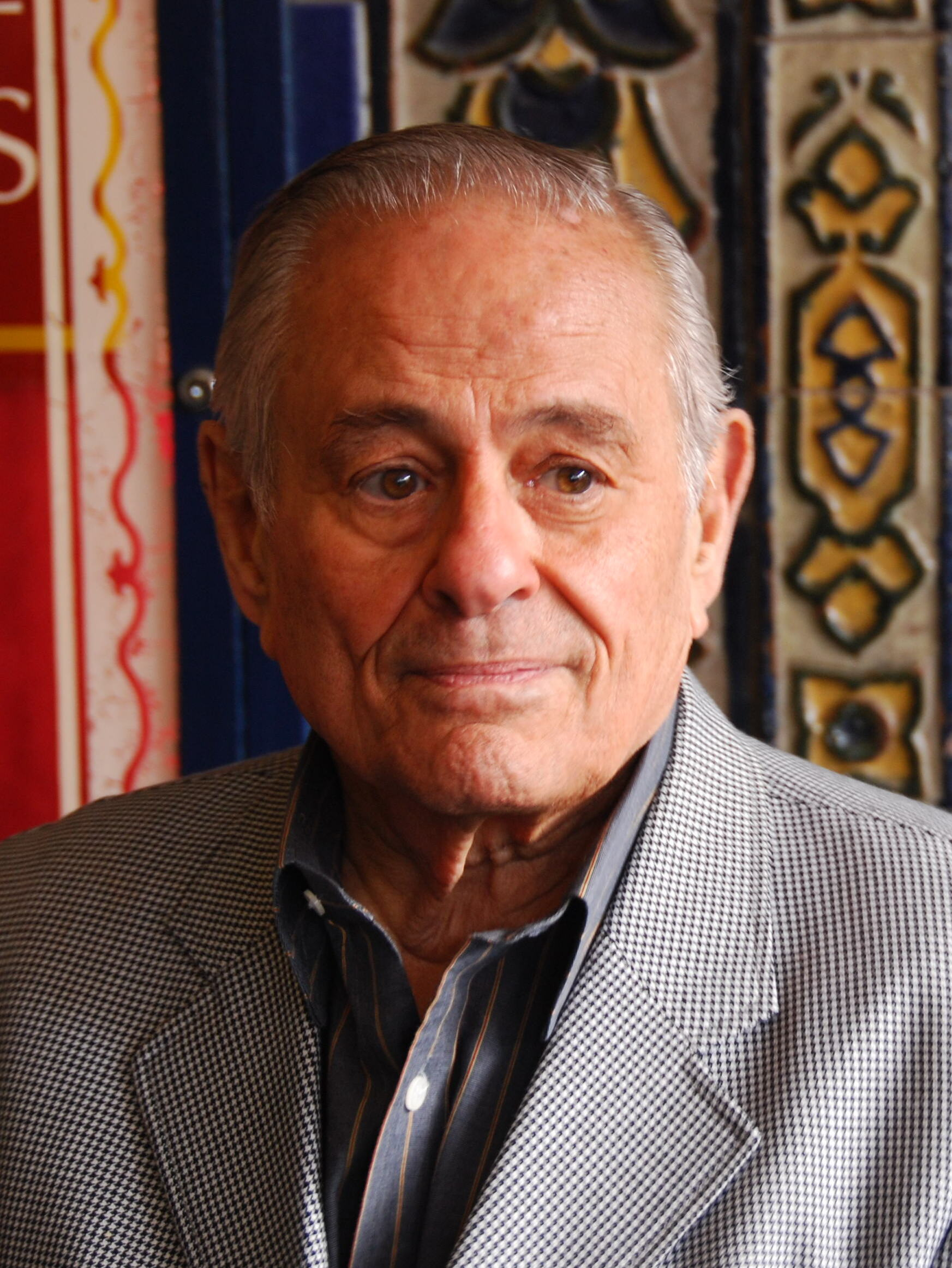
- Kanbar in 2007 at the San Francisco International Film Festival
- Born: Moshe Shama; March 1, 1929; Mandatory Palestine
- Died: August 20, 2022 (aged 93); San Francisco, California, U.S.
- Occupations: Entrepreneur, inventor
- Known for: Skyy vodka

Maurice Kanbar (March 1, 1929 – August 20, 2022) was an American entrepreneur and inventor who lived in San Francisco, California. He was particularly well known for his creation of Skyy vodka and was also noted for his extensive real estate investments.

== Biography ==
Kanbar was born as Moshe Shama on March 1, 1929, in Mandatory Palestine, one of three sons born to Meier and Hana (née Kanbar) Shama. His family emigrated from Jerusalem to New York in 1937. His Jewish parents raised Maurice and his two brothers in Boro Park, Brooklyn.

Maurice Kanbar is a 1952 alumnus of Philadelphia Textile Institute.

Kanbar had stated he owns 50 patents on various consumer and medical products, invented the D-Fuzz-It comb for sweaters, Tangoes Puzzle Game, the Safetyglide hypodermic needle protector SooFoo, Zip Notes, and a cryogenic cataract remover. He created New York's first multiplex cinema, the Quad Cinema, which was the first movie theater in Manhattan to have four small auditoriums in one building.

In the beverage industry, Kanbar had a success with Skyy vodka, also introduced Vermeer Dutch Chocolate Cream Liqueur and more recently launched Blue Angel Premium Vodka.

He produced the animated film Hoodwinked! which was released in January 2006 and grossed over $100M worldwide, and a sequel Hoodwinked Too! Hood vs. Evil.

Kanbar owned over 17 acres of commercial property in West Oakland, California, including the American Steel Building, home to more than 150 artists, makers and small businesses, and the historic Pacific Pipe building, both purchased by 11 West Partners in late 2016. He also owned nearly 20 commercial high-rise buildings in downtown Tulsa, Oklahoma, including the Bank of America Center, the art-deco inspired Philcade Building, Pythian Building, Atlas Life Building and Adams Building and the 41-story First Place Tower. His extensive investments in Tulsa led to a legal dispute with his former business partner Henry Kaufman, with each suing the other. At one point Kanbar's company was reported to have owned as much as one-third of all available office space in downtown Tulsa although these properties were subsequently sold. In 2017, Kanbar sold a portfolio of at least 13 Tulsa buildings to his operating partner, Stuart Price.

Kanbar was a 1952 graduate of Philadelphia University (then known as Philadelphia Textile Institute), where he studied materials science. In 2005, he donated $6 million for the construction of the school's new campus center, then the largest donation in the school's history. In 2012, he gave Philadelphia University another $15 million for a new interdisciplinary college, now named the Kanbar College of Design, Engineering and Commerce. In 1997, Kanbar donated $5 million to the Tisch School of the Arts, part of New York University, which named its film school after him: The Maurice Kanbar Institute of Film and Television. Kanbar Hall, an academic building at Bowdoin College, the alma mater of Maurice's brother, Elliott, was funded by donations from the Kanbar Charitable Trust and from Elliott. Kanbar, who was Jewish, had given millions of dollars to various Israeli charities as well.

Kanbar owned and lived in an eight-story residential tower in the Pacific Heights neighborhood of San Francisco; he received attention for his 1999 decision to evict his tenants in order to become the sole occupant of the building. He was a member of Mensa. He has received honorary degrees from Philadelphia University, Kenyon College, Bar-Ilan University, and Yeshiva University.

== Legacy ==
- Kanbar Award
- Kanbar Hall, Jewish Community Center of San Francisco
- Kanbar Campus Center, Thomas Jefferson University
- Kanbar College of Design, Engineering & Commerce, Thomas Jefferson University
- Kanbar Institute of Film and Television, New York University
- Maurice Kanbar Center for Biomedical Engineering, Cooper Union

== Personal life ==
Kanbar never married or had children. He died on August 20, 2022, at his home in San Francisco at the age of 93 and was survived by his brother Elliott.

== Filmography ==
=== Film ===
Year	Title	Role	Notes
2005	Hoodwinked!	Producer	
2011	Hoodwinked Too! Hood vs. Evil	Producer	Final film

== Bibliography ==
- Secrets from an Inventor's Notebook, by Maurice Kanbar, Penguin Books. ISBN 0-14-200056-6
