= Kam (name) =

- Language: Chinese (primarily Cantonese), Dutch, Korean, Khmer, Yiddish

Other names
- Variant forms: Chinese: Gan, Kan, Jin, Qin; Korean: Gam; Yiddish: Kamm

Kam is a given name, nickname or surname.

== Given name ==
As a given name, Kam may be short for Kameron, which is a variant of Cameron, a given name which originated from a Scottish surname. Another similar shortened form is Cam.

People with the given name or nickname Kam include:

- Kam Buckner (born 1985), American politician
- Kam Chancellor (born 1988), American National Football League player
- Kam Dewberry (born 2004), American National Football League player
- Kam Fong Chun (1918–2002), American actor best known for playing Chin Ho in the original television series Hawaii Five-O
- Kam Franklin (born 1987), American singer-songwriter
- Kam Franklin (American football) (born 2005), American football player
- Kam Ghaffarian, Iranian-born American space industry businessman
- Kam Heskin (born 1973), American actress
- Kam Jones (born 2002), American basketball player
- Kam Lee (born 1966), American death metal musician
- Kam McLeod (died 2019), Canadian fugitive
- Kam Mickolio (born 1984), American baseball pitcher
- Kam Robinson (born 2005), American football player
- Kam Selem, Inspector General of the Nigerian Police (1966–1975)
- Kam Tang (fl. 2000s), British illustrator
- Kam Yuen (1941–2023), Chinese-born American martial arts expert

== Surname ==
=== Origins ===
As a Chinese surname, Kam may be a spelling of the pronunciation in different varieties of Chinese of the following surnames, listed based on their Pinyin spelling (which reflects the Mandarin Chinese pronunciation):

- Gān (Chinese: 甘), spelled Kam based on its Cantonese (Jyutping: Gam1; Cantonese Yale: Gām; IPA: /kɐm⁵⁵/), Hakka (Hagfa Pinyim: Gam¹; IPA: /kam²⁴/), and Hokkien (Pe̍h-ōe-jī: Kam; IPA: /kam⁴⁴/) pronunciations
- Jīn (Chinese: 金), homophonous with the above surname in Cantonese, though not in other varieties of Chinese
- Qín (Chinese: 琴), spelled Kam based on its Cantonese pronunciation (Jyutping: Kam4; Cantonese Yale: Kàhm; IPA: /kʰɐm²¹/)

The Dutch surname Kam originated in multiple ways. As an occupational surname, it came from both Dutch kam meaning "comb" (referring metonymically to comb makers, wool combers, or fullers), or from Middle Dutch kamme meaning "brewery". As a toponymic surname, it is a reduced form of Van Kam, referring to Chaam (formerly spelled Kam) in North Brabant, near Breda.

The Jewish surname Kam (Yiddish and Hebrew: קם), also spelled Kamm, originated from various German words, including Middle High German kâm "mould" or kam "comb".

As a Korean surname, Kam is the McCune–Reischauer and Yale Romanization spelling of the surname transcribed in the Revised Romanization of Korean as Gam (Korean: 감; Hanja: 甘); it is written using the same character as for the Chinese surname Gān mentioned above. The bearers of this surname in Korea identify with a number of bon-gwan (hometowns of a clan lineage), including Changwon, Masan, Geochang, Buryeong, Changnyeong, Chungju, and Happo, but all of these are branches of the Hoesan Gam (Kam) clan, and claim common descent from Gam Gyu, a Chinese civil official who came to Goryeo in the retinue of Princess Noguk for her marriage to King Gongmin. It was one of eighteen Korean clans founded by Yuan Dynasty officials who accompanied princesses to Korea.

=== Statistics ===
In the Netherlands, there were 157 people with the surname Kam as of 2007, up from 38 in 1947.

The 2000 South Korean census found 5,998 people in 1,910 households with the surname. A study by the National Institute of the Korean Language based on 2007 application data for South Korean passports found that 70% of applicants with this family name spelled it in Latin letters as Kam in their passports, while 20% spelled it Gam. Rarer alternative spellings included Kahm.

The 2010 United States census found 3,749 people with the surname Kam, making it the 8,749th-most-common name in the country. This represented an increase from 3,358 (8,954th-most-common) in the 2000 Census. In both censuses, slightly more than 70% of the bearers of the surname identified as Asian, and about 15% as White. It was the 404th-most-common surname among respondents to the 2000 Census who identified as Asian.

=== People with the surname ===
Surname 甘:

- Alex Kam (감강찬; 甘強燦; born 1995), South Korean figure skater
- Genervie Kam (甘诗琳; born 1980), Malaysian classical musician
- Kam Nai-wai (甘乃威; born 1960), Hong Kong politician
- Kam Ning (甘寧; fl. 1987–present), Singaporean violinist
- Richard Kam (감강인; born 1996), South Korean ice dancer, younger brother of Alex
- Kam Wai Leung (born 1950), Hong Kong fencer
- Kam Woo-sung (감우성; 甘宇成; born 1970), South Korean actor

Surname 金:

- Andrew Kam (金民豪; fl. 1984–present), Hong Kong theme park executive
- Elaine Kam (金燕玲; born 1954), Taiwan-born Hong Kong actress
- Peter Kam (金培達; born 1961), Hong Kong film music composer

Other:

- Anat Kam or Kamm, (born 1987), Israeli journalist
- Isca Kam (born 1980), Nauruan weightlifter
- Joseph Kam (1769–1833), Dutch missionary in Indonesia
- Kampton Kam (born 2001), Singaporean high jumper
- Lyn-Wannan Kam (fl. 2010–present), Nauruan politician
- Moshe Kam (born 1955), Israeli electrical engineer and academic
- Roray Kam (born 1961), American surfer
- Sharon Kam (born 1971), Israeli classical clarinetist
- Sophie Heidi Kam (born 1969), Burkinabe writer
- Søren Kam (1921–2015), Danish World War II Waffen-SS officer and wanted Nazi war criminal

== See also ==
- Cam (name), given name and surname
