= List of states in the Holy Roman Empire (H) =

This is a list of states in the Holy Roman Empire beginning with the letter H. Some historians mark the beginning of the Empire as 800, with the coronation of Frankish king Charlemagne ("Charles the Great").

Notes:
- The "Imperial Circle" column shows to which circle (Reichskreis) the state belonged;
- the "Imperial Diet" column shows where the state was represented in the Imperial Diet or "Bench" (Reichstag).
An explanation of these columns is shown in the main article for this topic, linked here. It also expands on other terms used, which may be accessed via: definition of terms.

Name	Type	Imperial circle	Imperial diet	History
Haag	HRE County	Bav	SC	10th Century: Formed: 980: First mentioned, to Lords of Gurren von Haag; 1245: Gurren von Haag extinct; to Fraunberg; 1276: To Fraunberg-Haag; 1465: HRE Barony; 1509: HRE County; 1566: Extinct; to Bavaria; 1588: To Bavaria-Haag; 1608: To Wartenberg; 1777: Extinct; to Bavaria; 1804: Abolished
Habsburg	County	—N/a	—N/a	1040: Formed: 1232: Partitioned into itself and Habsburg-Laufenburg; 1305: United to Austria; 1414: To Bern
Habsburg-Laufenburg	County	—N/a	—N/a	1232: Formed: Partitioned from Habsburg: 1274: Partitioned into itself and Kyburg; 1282: Acquired Landgraviate of Klettgau; 1353: Partitioned into Habsburg-Laufenburg-Neu-Rapperswil Habsburg-Laufenburg-Laufenburg and Habsburg-Laufenburg-Alt-Rapperswil
Habsburg-Laufenburg-Alt-Rapperswil	County	—N/a	—N/a	1353: Formed: Partitioned from Habsburg-Laufenburg; 1375: Extinct; to Habsburg-Laufenburg-Laufenburg
Habsburg-Laufenburg-Laufenburg	County	—N/a	—N/a	1353: Formed: Partitioned from Habsburg-Laufenburg; 1408: Extinct; to Austria; 1410: Klettgau passed to Sulz
Habsburg-Laufenburg-Neu-Rapperswil	County	—N/a	—N/a	1353: Formed: Partitioned from Habsburg-Laufenburg; 1354: Sold Neu-Rapperswil to Austria; 1356: Fief of Austria; 1358: Remaining territory sold to Austria; 1392: Extinct
Hadeln	"Farmer Republic" 1210 - 1852	—N/a	—N/a	1210: Formed; Before 1180: Part of older Duchy of Saxony; 1180: To Archbishopric of Bremen; 1210: To Duchy of Saxony, as a Farmer Republic; 1260: To Saxe-Lauenburg; 1305–1402: Joint overlordship of the lines of Saxe-Lauenburg; 1402: To Hamburg; 1481: To Saxe-Lauenburg; 1689–1731: Imperial custody; 1731: To Electorate of Hanover; 1810: To France; 1813: To Kingdom of Hanover; 1852: Autonomy cancelled; 1866: To Prussia; 1884: Distinct Estates dissolved
Hagenau	"Landvogtei"	—N/a	—N/a	Formation date unknown: 1423: To the Electorate of the Palatinate; 1553: To Austria; 1648: To France; 1686: Abolished
Haguenau (Hagenau)	Imperial Free City	Upp Rhen	RH	12th Century: Formed: 1257: Free Imperial City; 1648: To France
Hainaut	County (Note: Unification of countship of Bergen, margraviate of Valenciennes and the southern countship of the Brabant shire)	Burg	—N/a	900: Formed: 1071: Unified; 1299: United with the County of Holland; 1436: To Burgundy; 1516: To Spanish Netherlands; 1713: To Austria; 1794: To France; 1815: To Netherlands; 1830: To Belgium
Halberstadt	Bishopric; Prince-Bishopric	Low Sax	see below	804: Formed: 1180: Imperial immediacy; 1648: Secularised as a principality to Brandenburg
Halberstadt	Principality	Low Sax	PR	1648: Formed: Secularised from Bp. of Halberstadt for Brandenburg: 1807: To Westphalia; 1813: To Prussia
Haldenstein	Barony	—N/a	—N/a	1260: Formed: First mentioned: Originally to Knights of Haldenstein as fief to Vaz; 1300: Inherited Lichtenstain; immediate lordship; 14th Century: Fief of Bishopric of Chur; 1388: Extinct; to Greifensee; 1424: Imperial immediacy; 1469: To Friedingen; 1494: To Grüningen; 1509: To Rhäzüns; 1542: To Castion; 1567: To Neu-Aspermont; 1608: To Schauenstein; 1695: To Salis-Maienfeld; 1803: To Graubünden
Hall; see: Schwäbisch Hall	[data missing]	[data missing]	[data missing]	[data missing]
Hallermund	County	Low Rhen	WE	12th Century: Fief of Bishopric of Minden: 1191: Extinct; to Käfernburg as fief of Bishopric of Minden; 1197: Partitioned from Käfernburg; 1298: Half to Lüneburg; 1411: Extinct; succession dispute between Brunswick-Wolfenbüttel and Bishopric of Minden; 1436: To Brunswick-Wolfenbüttel; 1707: To Platen-Hallermund; 1807: To Westphalia; 1813: To Hanover
Hals	1280: County	[data missing]	[data missing]	11th century: Formed: 1189: Lords of Hals extinct; to Lords of Kamm; 1280: HRE Count; 1375: Counts of Kamm extinct; succession dispute between Leuchtenberg and Ortenburg; 1485: To Aichberg; 1511: Aichberg extinct; succession dispute between Degenberg and Ortenburg; 1517: To Bavaria; To Cronenstein; To Sinzendorf; 1715: To Bavaria
Hamburg	Imperial City	Low Sax	RH	1189: Formed: 1241: Founding member of the Hansa; 1510: Imperial city; 1810: Annexed to France; 1815: Free City
Hanau; From 1642: Count of Hanau, Rieneck and Zweibrücken, Lord of Münzenberg, Lichtenberg and Ochsenhausen	1429: HRE County	Upp Rhen	WT	13th century: Formed: 1243: 1st mention of Hanau castle; 1458: Partitioned into Hanau-Münzenberg and Hanau-Babenhausen; 1642: Reunited by Hanau-Lichtenberg; 1736: Extinct; to Hesse-Cassel and Hesse-Darmstadt
Hanau-Babenhausen	County	—N/a	—N/a	1458: Formed: Partitioned from Hanau; 1480: Acquired Lichtenberg, renamed to Hanau-Lichtenberg
Hanau-Lichtenberg	County	Upp Rhen	WT	1480: Formed: Renamed from Hanau-Babenhausen: 1642: Renamed to Hanau; 1736: Hanau extinct; to Hesse-Darmstadt
Hanau-Münzenberg	County	Upp Rhen	WT	1458: Formed: Partitioned from Hanau: 1642: Extinct; to Hanau-Lichtenberg; 1736: Hanau extinct; to Hesse-Cassel
Hanover; Electorate of Brunswick-Lüneburg	HRE Prince-Elector	Low Sax	EL	1692: Formed: Brunswick-Calenberg raised to Electorate: 1714: In personal union with the United Kingdom of Great Britain and Ireland; 1807: To Westphalia; 1813: Kingdom of Hanover; 1866: To Prussia
Harburg	Lordship	—N/a	—N/a	c. 1100: First mentioned: 13th Century: Extinct; 1299: To Oettingen; 1522: To Oettingen-Oettingen; 1806: To Bavaria
Hardegg	1383: HRE County	—N/a	—N/a	12th Century: To the Counts of Plain: 1188: Plain assumes the name "Plain and Hardegg"; 1260: Extinct in male line; 1262: To Devin by marriage; 1276: To Rabenswalde by marriage; 1278: HRE County; 1314: Extinct; to Magdeburg (Maydburg); 1481: To Austria; 1493: To Barons of Prüschenk who assumed the name "Hardegg", as fief of Austria; 1499: HRE County Hardegg und im Machlande
Harmersbach	Imperial Valley	—N/a	—N/a	1718: Formed: Free Imperial Valley: Harmersbach was attached to the Free City of Zell. However the legal basis for doing so was shaky, and a bailiwick was established in the valley; 1689: Legally attached to Zell; 1718: Free Imperial Valley; 1803: To Baden
Harrach; Count of Harrach in Rohrau and Thannhausen, etc.	1628: HRE County (Personalist)	—N/a	SW	1628: Formed: Acquired non-immediate County of Rohrau; Acquired non-immediate County of Thannhausen
Hatzfeld; HRE Prince of Hatzfeld-Gleichen-Trachenberg, Baron of Wildenburg, Lord of Crottorf, Schönstein, Kranichfeld, Blankenhain, etc.	Lordship: 1635: HRE County; 1748: HRE Principality	Upp Sax	FR	12th Century: Fiefs of Thuringia: 1311: Fiefs of Hesse; 1331: Partitioned into several lines; 1635: Hatzfeld-Wildenburg-Crottorf line invested with Gleichen and other territories; HRE Count; 1640: Imperial estate; immediate HRE Counts of Gleichen; 1741: non-immediate Princes of Trachenberg in Prussia; 1794: Princely line extinct; immediate territories to Mainz; rest to other lines
Hauenstein	County	—N/a	—N/a	Formation date unknown: Between 1111 and 1408, the House of Habsburgs obtained possession of numerous territories and titles in the region surrounding Hauenstein; 1806: To Baden
Hausen	Lordship	??	[data missing]	Formation date unknown; 1500: Franconian Circle
Havelberg	Bishopric	Upp Sax	EC	948: Formed: 983: Havelberg lost; titular see; 1144: Diocese regained; 1571: To Brandenburg
Heggbach	Abbacy	Swab	SP	1231: Formed: 1429: Imperial immediacy; 1803: To Waldbott von Bassenheim; 1806: To Württemberg
Heideck; (Heydeck)	HRE Lordship	Upp Rhen	WE	1192: Formed: Originally named Erlingshofen; built Heideck and assumed that name: 1445: Fief of Bavaria-Landshut; 1472: Extinct; to Bavaria-Landshut; 1505: To Palatinate-Neuburg; 1769: Bestowed as title to Josepha von Heydeck and her children; 1789: Purchased HRE County of Bretzenheim; Prince; 1795: Bretzenheim to France; 1803: Acquired Lindau; 1804: Sold to Austria
Heilbronn	Imperial Free City	Swab	SW	1371: Formed: Free Imperial City; 1802: To Württemberg
Heiligenberg	County	—N/a	—N/a	1135: Counts of Linzgau assumed name Heiligenberg: Formed: 1277: Extinct; to Werdenberg; 1308: To Werdenberg-Heiligenberg; 1535: To Fürstenberg (Swabia); 1559: To Fürstenberg-Heiligenberg; 1716: To Fürstenberg-Fürstenberg; 1744: To Fürstenberg (state); 1806: To Grand Duchy of Baden
Heiligkreuztal	Abbacy	—N/a	—N/a	1227: Formed: Founded as Wasserschapfen Abbey: 1231: Renamed to Heiligkreuztal; 1234: Imperial immediacy; 1803: To Württemberg
Heinsberg	County	—N/a	—N/a	1085: Formed: Branch of the Counts of Wassenberg; 1479: Annexed to Jülich
Helfenstein; (Helffenstein)	County	Swab	SC	1113: Formed: 1200: Partitioned into Helfenstein-Sigmaringen and Helfenstein-Helfenstein; 1296: Reunited by Helfenstein-Helfenstein; 1351: HRE County; 1356: Partitioned into Helfenstein-Blaubeuren and Helfenstein-Wiesensteig
Helfenstein-Blaubeuren	Lordship	Swab	—N/a	1356: Formed: Partitioned from Helfenstein: 1447: Blaubeuren sold to Württemberg; 1448: Heidenheim sold to Württemberg; 1517: Extinct; to Helfenstein-Wiesensteig
Helfenstein-Gundelfingen	Lordship	Swab	—N/a	1548: Formed: Partitioned from Helfenstein-Wiesensteig; 1626: Extinct; to Helfenstein-Wiesensteig
Helfenstein-Helfenstein	Lordship	—N/a	—N/a	1200: Formed: Partitioned from Helfenstein: 1241: Partitioned into itself and Helfenstein-Spitzenberg; 1296: Renamed to Helfenstein
Helfenstein-Sigmaringen	Lordship	—N/a	—N/a	1200: Formed: Partitioned from Helfenstein: 12??: Extinct; to Helfenstein-Helfenstein
Helfenstein-Spitzenberg	Lordship	—N/a	—N/a	1241: Formed: Partitioned from Helfenstein-Helfenstein; 1296: Extinct; to Helfenstein-Helfenstein
Helfenstein-Wellheim	Lordship	Swab	—N/a	1548: Formed: Partitioned from Helfenstein-Wiesensteig; 1564: Extinct; to Helfenstein-Wiesensteig
Helfenstein-Wiesensteig	Lordship	Swab	—N/a	1356: Formed: Partitioned from Helfenstein: 1396: Geislingen and Helfenstein sold to Ulm; 1450: To Württemberg; 1457: Restored; 1548: Partitioned into itself, Helfenstein-Gundelfingen and Helfenstein-Wellheim; 1627: Extinct; To Fürstenberg-Messkirch, Leuchtenberg, and Oettingen-Baldern; 1646: Leuchtenberg and Oettingen share of Wiesensteig sold to Bavaria
Helmarshausen	Abbacy	—N/a	—N/a	997: Formed: 997: Imperial immediacy; 1160: To the Bishopric of Paderborn; 1191: Imperial immediacy; 1479: Fief of Hesse-Cassel; 1538: Secularised and abolished
Helmstedt; See: St Ludger	Abbacy	[data missing]	[data missing]	[data missing]
Henneberg	County; 1471: HRE Princely Count of Henneberg	Franc	PR	1037: Counts then known as Babenburg: Formed: 1096: 1st mention of Henneberg as adopted name; 1190: Partitioned into Henneberg-Henneberg, Henneberg-Strauf and Henneberg-Bodenlauben
Henneberg-Aschach	Princely County	Franc	PR	1262: Formed: Partitioned from Henneberg-Schleusingen; 1535: Partitioned into Henneberg-Römhild and Henneberg-Schwarza
Henneberg-Bodenlauben (Botenlauben)	County	—N/a	—N/a	1190: Formed: Partitioned from Henneberg: 1234: Sold to the Bishopric of Würzburg; 1242: Extinct
Henneberg-Coburg	County	—N/a	—N/a	1245: Formed: Partitioned from Henneberg-Strauf; 1312: Extinct; to Henneberg-Schleusingen
Henneberg-Coburg	Princely County	—N/a	—N/a	1340: Formed: Partitioned from Henneberg-Schleusingen: 1347: Extinct; succession dispute though held by Jutta of Brandenburg; 1353: To Meissen
Henneberg-Hartenberg	County	—N/a	—N/a	1262: Formed: Partitioned from Henneberg-Schleusingen: 1371: Sold to Henneberg-Aschach; 1378: Extinct
Henneberg-Henneberg	County	—N/a	—N/a	1190: Formed: Partitioned from Henneberg; 1218: Extinct; to Henneberg-Strauf
Henneberg-Römhild	Princely County	Franc	PR	1535: Formed: Partitioned from Henneberg-Aschach: 1548: Sold to Mansfeld-Bornstedt; 1549: Extinct; 1555: To Electorate of Saxony
Henneberg-Schleusingen	Princely County	Franc	PR	1245: Formed: Partitioned from Henneberg-Strauf: 1262: Partitioned into Henneberg-Hartenberg, Henneberg-Aschach and itself; 1310: HRE Princely Count; 1340: Partitioned into Henneberg-Coburg and itself; 1583: Extinct; to Electorate of Saxony
Henneberg-Schwarza	Princely County	Franc	PR	1535: Formed: Partitioned from Henneberg-Aschach: 1549: To Katherine of Stolberg; 1577: To Stolberg-Stolberg
Henneberg-Strauf	County	—N/a	—N/a	1190: Formed: Partitioned from Henneberg; 1245: Partitioned into Henneberg-Coburg and Henneberg-Schleusingen
Herford Abbey	Abbacy	Low Rhen	RP	800: Formed: Moved from Müdehorst to Herford: 832: Imperial abbey; 1147: Imperial immediacy; 1523: HRE Princess; 1803: Secularised to Prussia
Herford	1631: Free City	Low Rhen	RH	1147: Formed: Imperial Free City; 1652: Annexed to Brandenburg
Héricourt	Lordship	—N/a	—N/a	12th Century: To Duchy of Burgundy: 1397: To County of Montbéliard; 1748: To France
Herrenzimmern	Lordship; 1530: County	Swab	SC	1495: Formed: Partitioned from Zimmern; 1570: Annexed to Mötzkirch
Herrstein	Lordship	[data missing]	[data missing]	[data missing]
Hersfeld	Abbacy	Upp Rhen	EC	769: Formed: 775: Imperial immediacy; 1606: Under administration by Hesse-Cassel; 1648: To Hesse-Cassel
Hesse	County: 1265: Landgraviate; 1292: Princely Landgraviate	Upp Rhen	PR	1247: Formed: Partitioned from Thuringia: 1458: Partitioned into Hesse-Cassel and Hesse-Marburg; 1500: Reunited by Hesse-Cassel; 1567: Partitioned into itself, Hesse-Marburg, Hesse-Rheinfels and Hesse-Darmstadt
Hesse-Bingenheim	Princely Landgraviate	—N/a	—N/a	1648: Formed: Appanage created from Hesse-Homburg; 1681: Extinct; to Hesse-Homburg
Hesse-Cassel; Prince-Elector of Hesse, Grand Duke of Fulda, Prince of Hersfeld, Hanau, Fritzlar & Isenburg, Count of Katzenelnbogen, Dietz, Ziegenhain, Nidda & Schaumburg	Princely Landgraviate; 1803: Electorate	Upp Rhen	PR	1458: Formed: Partitioned from Hesse: 1500: Renamed to Hesse; 1567: Partitioned from Hesse; 1627: Appanages Hesse-Rotenburg, Hesse-Wanfried and Hesse-Rheinfels created; 1730 - 1751: In personal union with Sweden; 1803: HRE Elector; 1806: To France; 1807: To Westphalia; 1813: Restored; 1866: To Prussia
Hesse-Darmstadt; Grand Duke of Hesse and of the Rhine	Princely Landgraviate; 1806: Grand Duchy	Upp Rhen	PR	1567: Formed: Partitioned from Hesse; 1596: Appanage Hesse-Homburg created; 1806: Grand Duchy
Hesse-Homburg Landgrave of Hesse, Prince of Hersfeld, Count of Katzenelnbogen, Dietz, Ziegenhain, Nidda, Schaumburg, Isenburg & Büdingen	Princely Landgraviate	—N/a	—N/a	1596: Formed: Appanage created in Hesse-Darmstadt: 1648: Appanage Hesse-Bingenheim split off; 1768: Imperial immediacy though represented by Hesse-Darmstadt; 1806: To Hesse-Darmstadt; 1815: Reestablished as sovereign state; 1866: To Prussia
Hesse-Marburg	Princely Landgraviate	Upp Rhen	PR	1458: Formed: Partitioned from Hesse: 1500: Extinct; to Hesse-Cassel; 1567: Partitioned from Hesse; 1604: Extinct; divided between Hesse-Cassel and Hesse-Darmstadt though all soon seized by Hesse-Cassel; 1627: All to Hesse-Darmstadt; 1648: Divided between Hesse-Cassel and Hesse-Darmstadt
Hesse-Rheinfels	Princely Landgraviate	Upp Rhen	PR	1567: Formed: Partitioned from Hesse; 1583: Extinct; to Hesse-Cassel
Hesse-Rheinfels	Princely Landgraviate	—N/a	—N/a	1627: Formed: Appanage created in Hesse-Cassel; 1658: Renamed to Hesse-Rheinfels-Rotenburg
Hesse-Rheinfels-Rotenburg	Princely Landgraviate	—N/a	—N/a	1658: Formed: Renamed from Hesse-Rheinfels; appanage of Hesse-Cassel; 1676: Appanage Hesse-Wanfried split off
Hesse-Rotenburg	Princely Landgraviate	—N/a	—N/a	1627: Formed: Appanage created in Hesse-Cassel; 1658: Extinct; to Hesse-Rheinfels
Hesse-Wanfried	Princely Landgraviate	—N/a	—N/a	1627: Formed: Appanage created in Hesse-Cassel: 1655: Extinct; to Hesse-Rheinfels; 1676: Appanage recreated from Hesse-Rheinfels-Rotenburg; 1755: Extinct; to Hesse-Rheinfels-Rotenburg
Hildesheim	Prince-Bishopric	Low Sax	EC	815: Formed: 1235: HRE Prince of the Empire; 1802: To Prussia; 1807: To Westphalia; 1813: To Prussia
Hildesheim	Free City	Low Sax	EC	1300: Formed; 1803: Annexed to Brandenburg
Hillesheim	Barony; 1712: HRE County	Upp Rhen	—N/a	Originally Knights in Jülich: 1712: HRE Count; 1722: Acquired part of Reipoltskirchen in the Upper Rhenish Circle; 1731: Acquired another part of Reipoltskirchen; 1785: Extinct; to Spee
Höchberg; see: Baden-Hachberg	Margraviate	[data missing]	[data missing]	[data missing]
Hochstaden	County	—N/a	—N/a	1074: Formed: First mentioned: 1149: Extinct; to Are-Hochstaden by marriage; 1261: To the Archbishopric of Cologne; 1265: Extinct
Hohenberg (Pfinzgau); – not to be confused with Hohenberg, below	County	—N/a	—N/a	11th Century; branch of Calw: Also counts of Lindenfels and advocates of Lorsch and Gottesaue Abbeys; 1123: Extinct
Hohenberg	HRE County	—N/a	—N/a	Originally a title of the Counts of Zollern: c. 1144: Partitioned from Zollern; 1237: Acquired Nagold and Wildberg; 1260: Partitioned into Hohenberg-Rottenburg and Hohenberg-Nagold
Hohenberg-Altensteig	County	—N/a	—N/a	1355: Formed: Partitioned from Hohenburg-Wildberg: 1387/97: Extinct; to Hohenburg-Nagold; 1398: To Margraviate of Baden; 1603: To Württemberg
Hohenberg-Bulach	County	—N/a	—N/a	1355: Formed: Partitioned from Hohenburg-Wildberg: 1363: Sold half of Wildberg to the Palatinate; 1364: Sold Bülach (see: Beiertheim-Bulach) to the Palatinate; 1374: Sold Horb to Hohenberg-Rottenburg; 1377: Sold remaining half of Wildberg to the Palatinate; 1419: Extinct
Hohenberg-Nagold	County	—N/a	—N/a	1260: Formed: Partitioned from Hohenberg: 1280: Acquired Altensteig; 1306: Acquired Horb; 1318: Partitioned into itself and Hohenberg-Wildberg; 1363: Nagold sold to Württemberg; 1398: Sold Altensteig to Margraviate of Baden; 1477: Extinct
Hohenberg-Rottenburg	County	—N/a	—N/a	1260: Formed: Partitioned from Hohenberg: 1374: Acquired Horb and Oberndorf; 1381: Sold to Austria; 1389: Extinct
Hohenberg-Wildberg	County	—N/a	—N/a	1318: Formed: Partitioned from Hohenberg-Nagold; 1355: Partitioned into Hohenberg-Bulach and Hohenberg-Altensteig
Hohenems; HRE Count of Hohenems, Lord of Lustenau	Lordship; 1560: HRE County	Swab	SW	1453: Formed: Renamed from Ems: 1560: HRE Counts; 1613: Acquired Vaduz and Schellenberg; 1646: Partitioned into Hohenems-Hohenems and Hohenems-Vaduz; 1718: Reunited by Hohenems-Vaduz; 1759: Extinct; to Austria; 1790: Lustenau ceded to Harrach-Hohenems / Waldburg-Zeil-Hohenems; see: Lustenau
Hohenems-Hohenems	County	Swab	SW	1646: Formed: Partitioned from Hohenems; 1718: Extinct; to Hohenems-Vaduz
Hohenems-Vaduz	County	Swab	SW	1646: Formed: Partitioned from Hohenems: 1712: Sold to Liechtenstein; 1718: Renamed to Hohenems
Hohenfels	HRE Lordship	—N/a	—N/a	12th Century: Formed: 1396: Extinct; to Jungingen; 1506: To the Teutonic Order; 1806: To Hohenzollern-Sigmaringen
Hohengeroldseck	Lordship; 1705: County	Swab	SC	1277: Formed: Partitioned from Geroldseck: 1298: Partitioned into itself and Veldenz; 1333: Partitioned into itself and Geroldseck-Sulz; 1634: Extinct; to Austria; 1636: To Kronberg; 1692: To Baden-Durlach; 1697: To Leyen; 1815: To Austria; 1819: To Baden
Hohenlohe	Lordship	Franc	FR	12th Century: Title held and later assumed by the lords of Weikersheim; 1219: Mergentheim to the Teutonic Order; 1230: Partitioned into itself and Brauneck; 1266: Partitioned into Hohenlohe-Weikersheim, Hohenlohe-Uffenheim and Hohenlohe-Röltingen
Hohenlohe-Brauneck; see: Brauneck	Lordship	[data missing]	[data missing]	[data missing]
Hohenlohe-Möckmühl	Lordship	—N/a	—N/a	1269: Formed: Partitioned from Hohenlohe-Uffenheim: 1340: Extinct; to Hohenlohe-Wernsberg; 1445: To the Palatinate
Hohenlohe-Neuenstein	County	Franc	FR	1551: Formed: Partitioned from Hohenlohe-Weikersheim; 1610: Partitioned into Hohenlohe-Neuenstein-Weikersheim, Hohenlohe-Neuenstein-Neuenstein and Hohenlohe-Neuenstein-Langenburg
Hohenlohe-Neuenstein-Ingelfingen; Hohenlohe-Ingelfingen	County; 1764: Principality	Franc	FR	1699: Formed: Partitioned from Hohenlohe-Neuenstein-Langenburg: 1764: HRE Prince; 1806: To Württemberg
Hohenlohe-Neuenstein-Kirchberg; Hohenlohe-Kirchberg	County; 1764: Principality	Franc	FR	1699: Formed: Partitioned from Hohenlohe-Neuenstein-Langenburg: 1764: HRE Prince; 1806: To Württemberg
Hohenlohe-Neuenstein-Künzelsau; Hohenlohe-Künzelsau	County	Franc	FR	1677: Formed: Partitioned from Hohenlohe-Neuenstein-Neuenstein; 1689: Extinct; to Hohenlohe-Neuenstein-Oehringen
Hohenlohe-Neuenstein-Langenburg; Hohenlohe-Langenburg	County; 1764: Principality	Franc	FR	1610: Formed: Partitioned from Hohenlohe-Neuenstein: 1699: Partitioned into itself, Hohenlohe-Neuenstein-Ingelfingen and Hohenlohe-Neuenstein-Kirchberg; 1764: HRE Prince; 1805: Bench of Princes; 1806: To Württemberg
Hohenlohe-Neuenstein-Neuenstein; Hohenlohe-Neuenstein	County	Franc	FR	1610: Formed: Partitioned from Hohenlohe-Neuenstein: 1677: Partitioned into Hohenlohe-Neuenstein-Oehringen, Hohenlohe-Neuenstein-Weikersheim, Hohenlohe-Neuenstein-Künzelsau and itself; 1698: Extinct; to Hohenlohe-Neuenstein-Oehringen
Hohenlohe-Neuenstein-Oehringen; Hohenlohe-Oehringen	County; 1764: Principality	Franc	FR	1677: Formed: Partitioned from Hohenlohe-Neuenstein-Neuenstein: 1708: Partitioned into itself and Hohenlohe-Neuenstein-Weikersheim; 1764: HRE Prince; 1803: Bench of Princes; 1805: Extinct; to Hohenlohe-Neuenstein-Ingelfingen
Hohenlohe-Neuenstein-Weikersheim; Hohenlohe-Weikersheim	County	Franc	FR	1610: Formed: Partitioned from Hohenlohe-Neuenstein: 1645: Extinct; to Hohenlohe-Neuenstein-Neuenstein; 1677: Partitioned from Hohenlohe-Neuenstein-Neuenstein; 1684: Extinct; to Hohenlohe-Neuenstein-Oehringen; 1708: Partitioned from Hohenlohe-Neuenstein-Oehringen; 1756: Extinct; to Hohenlohe-Neuenstein-Oehringen
Hohenlohe-Röltingen	Lordship	—N/a	—N/a	1266: Formed: Partitioned from Hohenlohe; c. 1290: Extinct; to Hohenlohe-Weikersheim
Hohenlohe-Uffenheim	Lordship	—N/a	—N/a	1266: Formed: Partitioned from Hohenlohe 1269: Partitioned into itself, Hohenlohe-Wernsberg and Hohenlohe-Möckmühl; 1378: Sold to Burgraviate of Nuremberg; 1412: Extinct
Hohenlohe-Waldenburg	County	Franc	FR	1551: Formed: Partitioned from Hohenlohe-Weikersheim; 1615: Partitioned into Hohenlohe-Waldenburg-Pfedelbach, Hohenlohe-Waldenburg-Waldenburg and Hohenlohe-Waldenburg-Schillingsfürst
Hohenlohe-Waldenburg-Bartenstein; Hohenlohe-Bartenstein	County; 1744: Principality	Franc	FR	1688: Formed: Partitioned from Hohenlohe-Waldenburg-Schillingsfürst: 1744: HRE Prince; 1798: Partitioned into Hohenlohe-Waldenburg-Jagstberg and itself; 1803: Bench of Princes; 1806: To Württemberg
Hohenlohe-Waldenburg-Jagstberg; Hohenlohe-Jagstberg	County; 1744: Principality	Franc	FR	1798: Formed: Partitioned from Hohenlohe-Waldenburg-Bartenstein; 1803: Bench of Princes; 1806: To Württemberg
Hohenlohe-Waldenburg-Pfedelbach; Hohenlohe-Pfedelbach	County	Franc	FR	1615: Formed: Partitioned from Hohenlohe-Waldenburg; 1728: Extinct; to Hohenlohe-Waldenburg-Bartenstein
Hohenlohe-Waldenburg-Schillingsfürst; Hohenlohe-Schillingsfürst	County; 1744: Principality	Franc	FR	1615: Formed: Partitioned from Hohenlohe-Waldenburg; 1688: Partitioned into Hohenlohe-Waldenburg-Bartenstein and itself; 1744: HRE Prince; 1803: Bench of Princes; 1806: Mediatised to Bavaria and Württemberg; 1807: Partitioned into itself and Hohenlohe-Schillingsfürst-Schillingsfürst lines
Hohenlohe-Waldenburg-Waldenburg; Hohenlohe-Waldenburg	County; 1744: Principality	Franc	FR	1615: Formed: Partitioned from Hohenlohe-Waldenburg; 1679: Extinct; to Hohenlohe-Waldenburg-Pfedelbach
Hohenlohe-Weikersheim	Lordship; 1450: County	Franc	FR	1266: Formed: Partitioned from Hohenlohe; 1450: HRE Count; 1551: Partitioned into Hohenlohe-Neuenstein and Hohenlohe-Waldenburg
Hohenlohe-Wernsberg	Lordship	—N/a	—N/a	1269: Formed: Partitioned from Hohenlohe-Uffenheim; 1350: Extinct; to Hohenlohe-Uffenheim
Hohensax	Barony; 1413: County	—N/a	—N/a	1248: Formed: Partitioned from Sax; 1633: Extinct; to Zürich
Hohenwaldeck and Maxlrain; Hohen-Waldeck	Lordship	[data missing]	[data missing]	Formation date unknown; 1500: Bavarian Circle
Hohenzollern	County	[data missing]	[data missing]	1288: Formed: Partitioned from Zollern; 1344: Partitioned into Hohenzollern-Schwarzgraf Line and Hohenzollern-Strasbourg Line
Hohenzollern-Haigerloch	County; 1623: Principality	Swab	SC	1575: Formed: Partitioned from Hohenzollern-Hechingen; 1623: HRE Prince; 1630: Extinct; to Hohenzollern-Sigmaringen; 1681: Partitioned from Hohenzollern-Sigmaringen; 1767: Extinct; to Hohenzollern-Sigmaringen
Hohenzollern-Hechingen; Prince of Hohenzollern-Hechingen, Burgrave of Nuremberg, Count of Sigmaringen and Veringen, Count of Berg, Lord of Haigerloch and Werstein, etc.	County; 1623: Principality	Swab	PR	1402: Formed: Partitioned from Hohenzollern-Strasbourg Line; 1512: Partitioned into itself and Hohenzollern-Hohenberg; 1575: Partitioned into itself, Hohenzollern-Sigmaringen, Hohenzollern-Haigerloch and Hohenzollern-Hohenzollern; 1623: HRE Prince; 1653: Bench of Secular Princes; 1849: To Prussia
Hohenzollern-Hohenberg	County	Swab	SC	1512: Formed: Partitioned from Hohenzollern-Hechingen; 1558: Extinct; to Hohenzollern-Hechingen
Hohenzollern-Hohenzollern	County	Swab	SC	1575: Formed: Partitioned from Hohenzollern-Hechingen; 1602: Extinct; to Hohenzollern-Hechingen
Hohenzollern-Öttingen	County	—N/a	—N/a	1402: Formed: Partitioned from Hohenzollern-Strasbourg Line; 1423: To Württemberg; 1439: Restored; 1443: Extinct; sold to Württemberg
Hohenzollern-Schwarzgraf Line	County	—N/a	—N/a	1344: Formed: Partitioned from Hohenzollern; 1412: Extinct; to Hohenzollern-Öttingen
Hohenzollern-Sigmaringen; HRE Prince of Hohenzollern-Sigmaringen, Burgrave of Nuremberg, Count of Sigmaringen and Veringen, Count of Berg, Lord of Haigerloch and Werstein, etc.	County; 1623: Principality	Swab	SC	1575: Formed: Partitioned from Hohenzollern-Hechingen; 1623: HRE Prince; 1681: Partitioned into itself and Hohenzollern-Haigerloch; 1803: Bench of Princes; 1849: To Prussia
Hohenzollern-Strasbourg Line	County	—N/a	—N/a	1344: Formed: Partitioned from Hohenzollern; 1402: Partitioned into Hohenzollern-Öttingen and Hohenzollern-Hechingen
Hohnstein (Hohenstein)	County	—N/a	—N/a	1154: Formed: Title held by the Counts of Ilfeld; fief of Saxony; 1178: Count of Ilfeld took the style "Hohnstein"; 1180: Imperial immediacy; 1253: Acquired Klettenberg as fief of the Bishopric of Halberstadt; 1263: Acquired Spatenberg as fief of Thuringia; 1268: Acquired Sömmerda; 1289: Partitioned into Hohnstein-Klettenberg and Hohnstein-Sondershausen
Hohnstein-Heldrungen	County	—N/a	—N/a	1315: Formed: Partitioned from Hohnstein-Klettenberg; 1423: Sold to Stolberg-Stolberg; 1478: Renamed to Hohnstein-Vierraden after acquisition of Vierraden as fief of Brandenburg
Hohnstein-Heringen	County	—N/a	—N/a	1394: Formed: Partitioned from Hohnstein-Heringen-Kelbra; 1412: Half sold to Stolberg-Stolberg; 1417: Other half to Stolberg-Stolberg; 1432: Extinct
Hohnstein-Heringen-Kelbra	County	—N/a	—N/a	1373: Formed: Partitioned from Hohnstein-Klettenberg; 1394: Partitioned into Hohnstein-Heringen and Hohnstein-Kelbra
Hohnstein-Kelbra	County	—N/a	—N/a	1394: Formed: Partitioned from Hohnstein-Heringen-Kelbra; 1413: Sold to Stolberg-Stolberg; 1414: Extinct
Hohnstein-Klettenberg	County	—N/a	—N/a	1289: Formed: Partitioned from Hohnstein; 1315: Partitioned into itself and Hohnstein-Heldrungen; 1320: Acquired Lohra; 1373: Partitioned into Hohnstein-Lohra-Klettenberg and Hohnstein-Heringen-Kelbra
Hohnstein-Lohra-Klettenberg	County	Upp Sax	WT	1373: Formed: Partitioned from Hohnstein-Klettenberg; 1593: Extinct; to Bishopric of Halberstadt; 1632: Lohra to Schwarzburg-Sondershausen; Klettenberg to Stolberg-Wernigerode; rest to Brunswick-Wolfenbüttel; 1640s: To Thun and Hohnstein; 1648: To Brandenburg; 1651: To Sayn-Wittgenstein; 1670: To Sayn-Wittgenstein-Hohnstein; 1699: To Prussia; 1806: To Westphalia; 1813: To Prussia
Hohnstein-Sondershausen	County	—N/a	—N/a	1289: Formed: Partitioned from Hohnstein; 1356: Extinct; to Schwarzburg-Blankenburg
Hohnstein-Vierraden and Schwedt	County	—N/a	—N/a	1478: Formed: Renamed from Hohnstein-Heldrungen after acquisition of Vierraden as fief of Brandenburg; 1481: Acquired Schwedt as fief of Brandenburg; 1609: Extinct
Holland	11th century: HRE County; 1806–1810: Kingdom of Holland	[data missing]	[data missing]	c. 1150: Split off from Bishopric of Utrecht; 1064: 1st mention of Holland; c. 1100: Title Count of Holland 1st used; 1299: United with the County of Hainaut; 1349–1433: To Bavarian Wittelsbachs; 1433–1482: To Duchy of Burgundy; later the dominant hegemon of the United Provinces, but as a republic, the house of Orange being merely styled stadholder; 1482–1581: To Habsburgs; 1512: Burgundian Circle; 1813: Kingdom of the Netherlands
Holstein; Duke of Schleswig, Holstein, Stormarn, Ditmarshes, Lauenburg & Oldenburg	Duchy	Low Sax	PR	1111: Formed: Lothair II enfeoffed County of Schaumburg with Holstein and Stormarn following the death without heirs of the Count of Hamburg; 1137 – 1142: To Badewide; 1203: To Denmark; 1227: To County of Schaumburg; 1261: Partitioned into Holstein-Kiel and Holstein-Itzehoe; 1554: Partitioned into Danish Holstein and Holstein-Gottorp; 1773: Restored to Denmark
Holstein-Gottorp	Duchy	—N/a	—N/a	1544: Formed: Partitioned from Danish Holstein; 1773: To Denmark for Oldenburg
Holstein-Kiel	County	—N/a	—N/a	1261: Formed: Partitioned from Holstein; 1273: Partitioned into Holstein-Segeberg and itself; 1316: To younger son of Holstein-Plön; 1390: Extinct; to Holstein-Rendsburg though Neuland and Herzhorn to Holstein-Schaumburg
Holstein-Plön	County	—N/a	—N/a	1290: Formed: Partitioned from Holstein-Itzehoe; 1350: Extinct; to Holstein-Kiel
Holstein-Rendsburg	County; 1474: Duchy	—N/a	—N/a	1290: Formed: Partitioned from Holstein-Itzehoe; 1386: Acquired Schleswig; 1397: Partitioned into itself and Holstein-Segeberg; 1459: Extinct; to Denmark; 1474: Duchy; superseded by Schleswig-Holstein
Holstein-Schaumburg (Schaumburg and Holstein-Pinneburg); HRE Prince, Count of Holstein, Schaumburg and Sternberg, Lord of Gemen	County; 1620: Principality	Low Rhen	WE	1290: Formed: Partitioned from Holstein-Itzehoe; 1528: Acquired Gemen; 1544: Partitioned into itself and Holstein-Schaumburg-Gemen; 1620: HRE Prince; 1640: Extinct; Two thirds of Holstein-Pinneburg to Denmark, one third of Holstein-Pinneburg to Schleswig-Holstein-Gottorp, half of Schaumburg to Hesse-Cassel, half of Schaumburg to Lippe-Alverdissen, Gemen to Limburg-Styrum
Holstein-Schaumburg-Gemen	County	Low Rhen	WE	1544: Formed: Partitioned from Holstein-Schaumburg; 1622: To Holstein-Schaumburg
Holstein-Segeberg	County	—N/a	—N/a	1273: Formed: Partitioned from Holstein-Kiel; 1308: Extinct; to Holstein-Kiel; 1397: Partitioned from Holstein-Rendsburg; 1403: Extinct; to Holstein-Rendsburg
Holzappel (Holzapfel)	1641: HRE County	Low Rhen	WE	1606: Formed: Peter Melander made HRE Knight, assumed the name "Holzappel"; 1641: HRE Count; 1642: Acquired Lülsdorf as fief of Palatinate-Neuburg; 1643: Purchased Esterau and Isselbach from Nassau-Hadamar; Bench of Counts of Westphalia; 1656: Acquired Nassau-Schaumburg; 1707: To Anhalt-Bernburg-Schaumburg-Hoym; 1806: To Nassau
Homburg	Territory	—N/a	—N/a	1180: Formed: To Eppstein; 1486: To Hanau-Münzenberg; 1524: To Hesse; 1567: To Hesse-Darmstadt; 1598: To Hesse-Homburg, appanage of Hesse-Darmstadt; 1768: To Hesse-Homburg; 1806: To the Grand Duchy of Hesse; 1815: To Hesse-Homburg; 1866: To Prussia
Homburg	Lordship	—N/a	—N/a	13th Century: Originally a territory of Isenburg; 1259: To Sayn; 1276: Imperial immediacy; 1284: To Sayn-Sayn; 1605: To Sayn-Wittgenstein; 1606: To Sayn-Wittgenstein-Berleburg; 1806: To Grand Duchy of Berg; 1815: To Prussia
Horne (Hoorn)	Lordship; 1450: County	Low Rhen	—N/a	11th to 12th Century: Formed; 1450: HRE Count; 1568: Extinct; to Spanish Netherlands; 1576: To the Prince-Bishopric of Liège; 1795: To France; 1815: To the Netherlands
Horneck	Commandery	—N/a	—N/a	13th Century: To the local Lords of Horneck: Formed; c. 1250: To the Teutonic Order; 1805: To Württemberg
Hörstgen (Horstgen)	Lordship	[data missing]	[data missing]	Formation date unknown; Under overlordship of Mors; To Counts of Drachenfels; 1530: Inherited by Millendonk-Mirlar; Passed to Brochhorst; Passed to Croy; Passed to Burlepsch; Passed to Ostein; 1754: Passed to Barons of Knesebec; 1794: French occupation; 1815: To Prussia
Höwen	Lordship	[data missing]	[data missing]	[data missing]
Hoya	County	—N/a	—N/a	1204: Formed: Before 1180: Part of older Duchy of Saxony, till emperor deposed Henry the Lion; 1202: 1st mention of "Count of Hoya"; 1215: Acquired Nienburg; 1338: Acquired Altbruchhausen; 1345: Partitioned into Hoya and Bruchhausen and itself; 1497: Extinct; to Hoya and Bruchhausen
Hoya and Bruchhausen (Nienburg)	County	Low Rhen	WE	1345: Formed: Partitioned from Hoya; 1384: Acquired Neubruchhausen; 1497: Acquired Hoya; 1512: To Brunswick-Lüneburg; 1519: Restored; 1582: Extinct; to Brunswick-Lüneburg
Hülchrath (Hilkerode)	County	—N/a	—N/a	12th Century: To Saffenburg as fief of Electorate of Cologne: 12th Century: To Sayn; 1247: To Sponheim-Heinsberg; 1255: To Cleves; c. 1275: Partitioned from Cleves; 1298: Sold Linn to Cleves; 1303: Sold Tomburg to Electorate of Cologne; 1322: Half sold to Electorate of Cologne; 1331: Remainder sold to Electorate of Cologne
