= Gan (surname) =

- Language: Chinese (Mandarin, Hokkien), Korean, Hebrew, Old Irish

Other names
- Variant forms: Chinese: Gam, Gum, Kam, Kan (甘); Yan, Ngan (顏); Korean: Kan; Irish: McGann; Hebrew: Gan
- Derivative: Ashkenazi: Gang, Ganer, Ganel, Ganet

Gan is a surname. It may be a Latin-alphabet spelling of four different Chinese surnames (Chinese: 甘, 干, 顏, 簡; respectively pronounced in Mandarin as Gān, Gān, Yán, Jiǎn), a Korean surname (Korean: 간; Hanja: 簡; written using the same character as the Chinese surname Jiǎn), a Hebrew surname (Hebrew: גַּן) meaning garden. It is also a surname in other cultures.

== Origins ==
As a Chinese surname, Gan may be one of the following surnames, listed by their spelling in Pinyin, which reflects the Mandarin Chinese pronunciation:

- Gān (Chinese: 甘; IPA: /kan⁵⁵/). Ancient sources differ on the origin of this surname. Yuanhe Xingzuan states that the first bearer of the surname was an official in the court of King Wu Ding, while Mingxian Shizu Yanxing Leigao states that it originated as a toponymic surname, referring to a place called Gan District (甘邑), located in what is now Huyi District, Xi'an, Shaanxi, where some descendants of King Wen of Zhou had settled.
- Gān (Chinese: 干), homophonous with the above surname in Mandarin Chinese, though not in other varieties of Chinese. According to the Wanxing Tongpu, this also originated as a toponymic surname, referring to a place called Gan District (干邑), located in what is now Jiangdu District, Yangzhou, Jiangsu; following the defeat of the State of Han by the State of Wu, some former residents of Han fled to Gan District and took Gan as their new surname.
- Yán (traditional Chinese: 顏; simplified Chinese: 颜), spelled Gan based on its Hokkien pronunciation (Pe̍h-ōe-jī: Gân; IPA: /gan¹³/). (1) Yan You (颜友) was the first king of the Xiao Zhu (Ni) state [小邾(倪)国] and was originally known as Cao You (曹友). His ancestor was called Yan An (晏安) who inherited a piece of land, which later flourished into the Zhu kingdom, a feudal state of Lu (魯國). According to the judicial rules of that time, Cao You had to give up his surname in order to ascend the throne. He adopted his father Yi Fu's style name Bo Yan. From then on Cao You was known as Yan You (颜友). This officially made Yan You the first Yan in Chinese history. Yan An (晏安) was the son of Luzhong (陸終), grandson of Zhurong clan (祝融) and Wuhui (吳回). Zhurong was said to be the son of Gaoyang (also known as Zhuanxu), a sky god. Zhuanxu was a grandson of the Yellow Emperor.
- Jiǎn (traditional Chinese: 簡; simplified Chinese: 简), spelled Gan (or more commonly Kan) based on its Cantonese pronunciation (Jyutping: Gaan2; Cantonese Yale: Gaán; IPA: /kɑːn³⁵/)

As a Korean surname, Gan is a variant spelling of the surname more commonly spelled as Kan (based on its McCune–Reischauer transcription).

Gan may also be an Irish surname, originating from Mag Gana. Another surname with the same origin is McGann.

Gan, which means "garden" in Modern Hebrew (גן) is still considered rare in most Jewish spaces, but its (and Gang's) origins can be either of the Hebrew form of the Ashkenazi Jewish surnames Gangolf, which itself originated by metathesis from the German masculine given name Wolfgang, or of the patronymic surnames Ganer, Ganel, and Ganet. The surname was also taken upon some Sephardic and Mizrahi Jews in Israel.

== Statistics ==
According to statistics cited by Patrick Hanks, 328 people on the island of Great Britain and eight on the island of Ireland bore the surname Gan as of 2011. In 1881 there had been 40 people in Great Britain with the surname Gan, primarily at Durham, Northumberland, Lancashire, Argyll, and London.

The 2010 United States census found 2,891 people with the surname Gan, making it the 11,003rd-most-common name in the country. This represented an increase from 2,301 (12,343rd-most-common) in the 2000 Census. In the 2010 census, about three-quarters of the bearers of the surname identified as Asian (up from three-fifths in the 2000 census), and two-tenths as White (down from three-tenths in the 2000 census). It was the 310th-most-common surname among respondents to the 2000 Census who identified as Asian.

== People ==
=== Chinese surname 甘 ===
- Gan De (甘德; fl. 4th century BC), Chinese astronomer and astrologer of the State of Qi
- Gan Ying (甘英; fl. 97), Chinese military ambassador sent on a mission to Rome
- Gan Ning (甘寧; fl. 180s–210s), Eastern Han dynasty military general
- Gan Siqi (甘泗淇; 1903–1964), Chinese People's Liberation Army general
- Gan Yetao (甘野陶; 1907–2002), Chinese diplomat
- Gan Yang (甘陽; born 1952), Chinese political philosopher
- Gan Rongkun (甘荣坤; born 1962), Chinese politician
- Jay Gan (甘剑英; born 1963), Chinese-born American agricultural and environmental scientist
- Gan Yao-ming (甘耀明; born 1972), Taiwanese writer
- Gan Wei (甘薇; born 1984), Chinese actress
- Gan Rui (甘锐; born 1985), Chinese football midfielder
- Gan Tingting (甘婷婷; born 1986), Chinese actress
- Gan Tiancheng (甘添成; born 1995), Chinese football forward
- Gan Quan (甘泉; born 1996), Chinese baseball pitcher

=== Chinese surname 干 ===
- Gan Jiang (干將), swordsmith of the Spring and Autumn period (c. 771–446 BC)
- Gan Ji (干吉; died 200), Eastern Han dynasty Taoist priest
- Gan Bao (干寶; fl. 315–336), Eastern Jin dynasty historian
- Gan Yingbo (干颖波; born 1985), Chinese football manager

=== Chinese surname 顏 ===
- Gan Kim Yong (颜金勇; born 1959), Singaporean politician (People's Action Party)
- Gan Thiam Poh (颜添宝; born 1963), Singaporean politician (People's Action Party)
- Steven Gan (颜重庆; born c. 1963), Malaysian journalist
- Frankie Gan (颜骏任; born 1966), Malaysian politician (Malaysian Chinese Association)
- Gan Peck Cheng (颜碧贞; born 1966), Malaysian politician (Democratic Action Party)
- Gan Ping Sieu (颜炳寿; born 1966), Malaysian politician (Malaysian Chinese Association)
- Gan Wee Teck (颜维德; born 1972), Malaysian mathematician
- Gan Siow Huang (颜晓芳; born 1975), Singaporean general
- Jeremy Gan (颜韦德; born 1979), Malaysian badminton player
- Gan Teik Chai (颜德财; born 1983), Malaysian badminton player
- Gan Mei Yan (颜薇恩; born 1984), Malaysian radio announcer
- Brendan Gan (颜兴龙; born 1988), Malaysian football midfielder
- Heidi Gan (颜海蒂; born 1988), Malaysian swimmer
- Luisa Gan (颜尔; born 1994), Singaporean actress

=== Other or unknown ===
- Aleksei Gan (1887 or 1893 – 1942), Russian anarchist avant-garde artist
- Chester Gan (1908–1959), American actor of Chinese descent
- Rafał Gan-Ganowicz (1932–2002), Polish exile and mercenary
- Jennifer Gan (1938–2000), American actress
- Pinchas Cohen Gan (פנחס כהן גן; born 1942), Israeli painter
- Steve Gan (born 1945), Filipino comics artist
- Barry L. Gan (born 1948), American philosophy professor
- Samuel Gan (born 1981), Singaporean biologist
- Shyam Gan (born 1998), Indian cricketer
- Gan Ching Hwee (born 2003), Singaporean swimmer

== Fictional characters ==
- Olag Gan, in the British television series Blake's 7 (1978–1981)
