= Kan (surname) =

- Language: Chinese (including Mandarin, Cantonese, Hokkien), Dutch, Japanese, Korean, and others

Kan is a surname of multiple origins.

== Origins ==
As a Chinese surname, Kan may be a spelling of the pronunciation in different varieties of Chinese of the following surnames, listed based on their Pinyin spelling (which reflects the Mandarin Chinese pronunciation):

- Kàn (traditional Chinese: 闞; simplified Chinese: 阚)
- Gān (Chinese: 甘 or 干), spelled Kan in the older Wade–Giles romanisation
- Jiǎn (traditional Chinese: 簡; simplified Chinese: 简), spelled Kan based on its Cantonese (Jyutping: Gaan2; Cantonese Yale: Gaán; IPA: /kɑːn³⁵/) or Hokkien (Pe̍h-ōe-jī: Kán) pronunciation
- Jìn (Chinese: 靳), spelled Kan based on its Cantonese pronunciation (Jyutping: Gan3; Cantonese Yale: Gan; IPA: /kɐn³³)

The Dutch surname Kan originated both as an occupational surname for a potter or pewterer (from Middle Dutch kan, 'tankard', 'flagon', 'pitcher'), and as a reduced form of van de Kan, possibly a toponymic surname referring to De Kan in Veurne.

As a Japanese surname, Kan may be written using multiple kanji (e.g. 菅, 簡, 韓, 寛).

As a Jewish surname, Kan is one of many variants of Cohen.

As a Korean surname, Kan is the Yale Romanization and McCune–Reischauer spelling of the uncommon surname spelled in the Revised Romanization as Gan (Korean: 간; Hanja: 簡). The hanja for this surname is the same one which is used to write the Chinese surname Jiǎn mentioned above. The bearers of this surname in Korea identify with a number of bon-gwan, which are hometowns of a clan lineage. The most common of these is the Gapyeong Gan clan. The clan's founding ancestor Gan Gyun (간균; 簡筠), an official under Myeongjong of Goryeo, settled in Gapyeong County, Gyeonggi Province, which became the clan hometown.

Additionally, Kan may be a transcription of the common Korean surname Kang (Korean: 강; Hanja: 姜, 江, 康) via the Kontsevich system spelling in the Cyrillic alphabet (Кан). This spelling can be found among ethnic Koreans from the former Soviet Union (Koryo-saram and Sakhalin Koreans).

Kan is also a Turkish surname.

== Statistics ==
In the Netherlands, there were 518 people with the surname Kan as of 2007, up from 246 in 1947. The increase is partly attributable to immigration from China and from Turkey.

According to statistics cited by Patrick Hanks, 715 people on the island of Great Britain and five on the island of Ireland bore the surname Kan as of 2011. In 1881 there had been seven people in Great Britain with the surname Kan, primarily at Middlesex.

The 2000 South Korean census found 2,429 people in 753 households with the surname spelled Gan in Revised Romanization.

The 2010 United States census found 3,005 people with the surname Kan, making it the 10,647th-most-common name in the country. This represented an increase from 2,705 (10,816th most-common) in the 2000 Census. In both censuses, about four-fifths of the bearers of the surname identified as Asian, and one-tenth as White. It was the 453rd-most-common surname among respondents to the 2000 Census who identified as Asian.

== People with this name ==
=== Surname 闞 (阚) ===
- Kan Qingzi (阚清子; born 1988), Chinese actress
- Kan Wencong (阚文聪; born 1992), Chinese wushu taolu athlete
- Kan Xuan (阚萱; born 1972), Chinese visual artist
- Kan Ze (闞澤; died 243), official of the state of Eastern Wu

=== Surname 菅 ===
- Kazunori Kan (菅 和範; born 1985), Japanese football midfielder
- Naoto Kan (菅 直人; born 1946), Japanese Prime Minister
- Nobuko Kan (菅 伸子; born 1945), Japanese writer

=== Surname 簡 ===
- Andrew Kan Kai-yan (簡啟恩; fl. 2020s), Hong Kong police official
- Billy Kan (簡志堅; born c. 1951), Hong Kong billionaire businessman
- Brian Kan (簡炳墀; 1937–2022), Hong Kong horse trainer
- Carmen Kan (簡慧敏; fl. 2020s), Hong Kong politician
- Kan Fook-yee (簡福飴; born 1936), Hong Kong surveyor
- Hok Hoei Kan (簡福輝; 1881–1951), Dutch East Indies landowner
- Kan Jong-woo (born 1982), South Korean singer, twin brother of Kan Jong-wook
- Kan Jong-wook (born 1982), South Korean singer, twin brother of Kan Jong-woo
- Kan Lai Bing (簡麗冰; 1933–2024), Hong Kong librarian
- Masayoshi Kan (簡 優好; born 1972), Japanese sprinter
- Kan Mi-youn (간미연; 簡美妍; born 1982), South Korean singer
- Paul Kan Man-Lok (born 1947), Hong Kong technology businessman
- Raymond Kan (簡日淦; 1932–?), Hong Kong architect
- Kan Ting Chiu (简廷照; born 1946), Singaporean judge
- Victor Kan (簡華捷; born 1941), Hong Kong martial artist
- Willy Kan (簡慧榆; 1978–1999), Hong Kong jockey
- Kan Yuet-keung (簡悅強; 1913–2012), Hong Kong banker
- Yuet Wai Kan (簡悅威; born 1936), Hong Kong-born American medical scientist

=== Other ===
- Kán, a Hungarian noble family
- Aleksander Kan (1925–2017), Russian-born Swedish history professor
- Alexander Rinnooy Kan (born 1949), Dutch mathematician
- Chinfa Kan (康珍化; born 1953), Japanese lyricist of Korean descent
- Dan Kan (executive), American technology executive
- Daniel Kan (1927–2013), Dutch mathematician
- Derek Kan (甘達慶), American business executive and government official
- Francisco Luna Kan (1925–2023), Mexican politician
- Gene Kan (1976–2002), British-born American computer programmer
- Georges Kan (born 1958), French musicologist
- Hanae Kan (韓英恵; born 1990), Japanese actress of Korean descent
- Ilya Kan (1909–1978), Soviet chess player
- Justin Kan (born 1983), American internet entrepreneur
- Matara Kan, VTuber
- Nachan Kan (fl.c. 1514–1544), Maya ruler
- Raybon Kan (born 1996), New Zealand comedian
- Ravza Kavakçı Kan (born 1972), Turkish politician
- Sergei Kan (born 1953), Soviet-born American anthropologist
- Shiu-Kay Kan (born 1951), Hong Kong-born British architect
- Suna Kan (1936–2023), Turkish violinist
- Toni Kan (born 1971), Nigerian writer
- Valery Kan (born 1978), Russian politician
- Victoria Kan (born 1995), Russian tennis player
- Wim Kan (1911–1983), Dutch cabaret artist
- Wouter Kan (born 1950), Dutch field hockey player
- Yo Kan (韓陽; born 1978), Chinese-born Japanese table tennis player
- Yue-Sai Kan (靳羽西; born 1949), Chinese-born American television host

== See also ==
- Kan (disambiguation)
- Kahn, a German surname
- Khan (name)
