= Protestant Church of Maluku =

Reformed church in Indonesia

Gereja Protestan Maluku
- Classification: Protestant
- Theology: Reformed
- Polity: Presbyterian
- Leader: Ketua Umum Pdt. Drs. Elifas Tomix Maspaitella.
- Associations: World Communion of Reformed Churches
- Region: Maluku
- Origin: 6 September 1935; Maluku
- Separated from: Gereja Protestan Calvinis; Gereja Protestan di Indonesia (GPI)
- Congregations: 775
- Members: 575,000

The Protestant Church of Maluku is a Reformed church in Indonesia. It is known locally as: Gereja Protestan Maluku or simply GPM. It was formed on September 6, 1935, when it was separated from the Protestant Church in Indonesia. The Protestant Church of Maluku has congregations only in the provinces of Maluku and North Maluku.

== History ==
- 1605 February 27: GPM began with their first service as the Gereja Protestan Calvanis (Calvinist Protestant Church) with Dutch citizens, employees of the Dutch East India Company (VOC), in Ambon.
- 1621 Forming of the church board, known as the Majelis Jemaat Indische Kerk, which was initially located in Batavia (Jakarta).
- 1622 The church board (Majelis Jemaat Indische Kerk) also had a body of leaders in Banda, which resulted in evangelism activities in Maluku, with increasing prevalence and intensity, particularly through the struggle of Adriaan Hulsebos, who attempted to go serve in Ambon, but his ship sank in the Bay of Ambon, he died, and his mission was continued by Pastor Rosskot (who was instrumental in organizing the first theological training in Ambon, Maluku, which was also the first in Indonesia).
- 1799 After the bankruptcy and dissolution of the VOC, many of the churches in Indonesia were dissolved, including some of the churches in Ambon.
- 1815–1833 Joseph Kam served in Ambon and throughout Maluku through the NZG (Nederlandsch Zendeling Genootschap).
- 1865 NZG stopped their official work in Maluku, but the church that had been planted continued to grow.
- 1930 The church continued to grow under the controle of the Dutch East Indies Company and was served by the Protestant Church of Indonesia (Gereja Protestan di Indonesia - GPI) and Nederlandse Zendeling Genotschaap (NZG). Thea area of service covered almost the whole of the Maluku islands.
- 1935 September 6: The Protestant Church of Maluku (GPM) officially began its era of independence in areas of finance, liturgy, and church doctrine.
- 1950 RMS (South Maluku Independence Movement) burned much of the city of Ambon and large areas Seram island including many church buildings in their fight for bringing independence to South Maluku.
- 1950 May 25: GPM became a member of PGI (Persekutuan Gererja-gereja di Indonesia - The Communion of Churches in Indonesia).
- 1993–2003 Conflict between Christians and Muslims throughout Maluku, resulting in thousands killed and hundreds of churches and mosques destroyed.

== Church leadership ==
=== Current Church leaders ===
GPM Synod Daily Worker Assembly for the 2020-2025 Period : (Majelis Pekerja Harian Sinode GPM Periode 2020-2025)

Leader: Pdt. Drs. Elifas Tomix Maspaitella.

Co-Leader 1: Pdt. Ny. L. Bakarbessy-Rangkoratat S.Th

Co-Leader 2: Pdt. H. I. Hetharie General Secretary: Pdt. S.I. Sapulette

Deputy General Secretary: Pdt. R. Rahabeat

Member of MPH:

• Pdt. Y. Colling

• Pdt. N. Souisa-G

• Pnt. Ny. D. Sahertian

• Pnt. F. Papilaya

Note :

- Pnt. : Penatua/Elder
- Pdt. : Pendeta/Pastor

=== Previous Church leaders ===
1935–1938

- Ketua : Pdt. J.E. Staap
- Wakil Ketua : Pdt. W.H. Tutuarima
- Sek. : Pdt. P. Souhuwat
- Bend. : Pdt. Jack van Vesson

1938–1940

- Ketua : Pdt. C. Hamel
- Wakil Ketua : Pdt. W.H. Tutuarima
- Sek. : Pdt. P. Souhuwat
- Bend. : Pdt. H.J. Visser

1940–1942

- Ketua : Pdt. W. van Oust
- Wakil Ketua : Pdt. P. Poot
- Sek. : Pdt. P. Souhuwat
- Bend. : Pdt. H.J. Visser

1942–1943 (Zaman Pendudukan Jepang)

- Ketua : Pdt. F. Siwabessy (Pj)
- Sek. : Pdt. P. Souhuwat Zaman Pendudukan Jepang

1943–1946

- Ketua : Pdt. S. Marantika
- Wakil Ketua : Pdt. J. Sapulete
- Sek. : Pdt. P. Souhuwat
- Bend. : Pdt. W.D.F. Amanupunyo

1946 (Transisi di Zaman Kemerdekaan RI)

- Ketua : Pdt. J. Kalk
- Wakil Ketua : Pdt. S. Marantika
- Sek. : Pdt. P. Souhuwat
- Bend. : Pdt. W.D. Dickkarhoff

1946–1947

- Ketua : Pdt. P. Poot
- Wakil Ketua : Pdt. ?
- Sek. : Pdt. P. Souhuwat
- Bend. : Pdt. W.D. Dickkarhoff

1947–1948

- Ketua : Pdt. J.C.W. van Wyck Juranse
- Wakil Ketua : Pdt. ?
- Sek. : Pdt. P. Souhuwat
- Bend. : Pdt. J.H. van Heerden

1948–1949

- Ketua : Pdt. Dr. J.J. Geiser
- Wakil Ketua : Pdt. ?
- Sek. : Pdt. P. Souhuwat
- Bend. : Pdt. J.H. van Vesson

1949

- Ketua : Pdt. C. Kainama
- Wakil Ketua : Pdt. ?
- Sek. : Pdt. P. Souhuwat
- Bend. : Pdt. M.F. Syauta

1949–1950 (Persoalan RMS dan Sikap Sinode GPM)

- Ketua : Pdt. S. Marantika
- Wakil Ketua : Pdt. ?
- Sek. : Pdt. D. Louhenapessy
- Bend. : Pdt. M.F. Syauta

1953–1957

- Ketua : Pdt. Chr. Mataheru
- Wakil Ketua : Pdt. F.H. de Fretes
- Sek. : Pdt. D. Louhenapessy
- Bend. : Pdt. M.F. Syauta

1957–1961 (dikeluarkan Pesan Tobat - 1960)

- Ketua : Pdt. F.H. de Fretes
- Wakil Ketua : Pdt. J.F.K. Wattimena - Pdt.W.D.F. Amanupunyo (Pengganti)
- Sek. : Pdt. D. Louhenapessy
- Bend. : Pdt. M.F. Syauta

1965–1970 (Reorganisasi Struktur dan Kepemimpinan GPM (I))

- Ketua : Pdt. Th. Pattiasina
- Wakil Ketua : Pnt. Chr. Soplanit, SH
- Sekum : Pdt. P. Tanamal
- Wkl.Sekum : Sdr. N.A. Likumahwa, BA
- Sek.Dep. Koinonia : Pdt. D. Louhenapessy
- Sek.Dep.Marturia : Pdt. F.C. Lewier, S.Th
- Sek.Dep.Diakonia : Syms. Drs. H.J. Pooroe
- Sek.Dep.Finek. : Bpk. P.H. Pelamonia
- Rektor Inst.Teol. : Pdt. A.N. Radjawane, S.Th (Ex Officio)

1970–1974

- Ketua : Pdt. Th. Pattiasina
- Wakil Ketua : Syms. Drs. H.J. Pooroe - Pdt. A.N. Radjawane, M.Th (Pengganti)
- Sekum : Pdt. P. Tanamal
- Wkl.Sekum : Drs.N.A. Likumahwa
- Sek.Dep. Koinonia : Pdt. D. Louhenapessy
- Sek.Dep.Marturia : Pdt. E.P. Kaihena, S.Th
- Sek.Dep.Diakonia : Bpk. W. Louhenapessy
- Sek.Dep.Finek. : Bpk. P.H. Pelamonia - Drs. F.S. Pattinasarany (1972-1974)
- Visitator : Pdt. M.J. Wattimena, S.Th

1974–1976

- Ketua : Pdt. Th. P. Pattiasina
- Wakil Ketua : Pdt. M.J. Wattimena, S.Th
- Sekum : Pdt. P. Tanamal, S.Th
- Wkl.Sekum : Drs.N.A. Likumahwa
- Sek.Dep. Koinonia : Pdt. A. Pattianakotta, Sm.Th
- Sek.Dep.Marturia : Pdt. E.P. Kaihena, S.Th
- Sek.Dep.Diakonia : Pdt. J. Ospara, S.Th
- Sek.Dep.Finek : Pdt. A.J. Soplantila, S.Th

Visitator : Pdt. F.C.Lewier, M.Th

1976–1978

- Ketua : Pdt. M.J. Wattimena, S.Th
- Wakil Ketua : Pdt. F.C. Lewier, M.Th
- Sekum : Pdt. A.J. Soplantila, S.Th
- Sek.Dep. Koinonia : Pdt. A. Pattianakotta, Sm.Th
- Sek.Dep.Marturia : Pdt. E.P. Kaihena, S.Th
- Sek.Dep.Diakonia : Pdt. J. Ospara, S.Th
- Sek.Dep.Finek. : Bpk. L. A. Tahalele

Visitator : Pdt. D. Louhenapessy

1978–1983 (Reorganisasi Struktur dan Kepemimpinan GPM (II))

- Ketua : Pdt. A.N. Radjawane, M.Th
- Wakil Ketua : Pdt. F.C. Lewier, M.Th
- Sekum : Pdt. A.J. Soplantila, S.Th
- Wkl. Sekum : Pdt. D. Louhenapessy
- Visitator : Pdt. E.P. Kaihena, S.Th
- Pdt. M. Alfons
- Drs. A. Rahalus

Staff BPH Sinode GPM:

- Sek. Dep.Kekes : Pdt. E.P. Kaihena, S.Th (merangkap)
- Sek.Dep.Pelpem : Pdt. J. Ospara, S.Th
- Sek.Dep.Finek : Bpk. L. A. Tahalele
- Dir. LPJ GPM : Pdt. F.C. Lewier, M.Th (merangkap)

1983–1985

- Ketua : Pdt. A.N. Radjawane, M.Th
- Wakil Ketua : Drs. A. Rahalus
- Sekum : Pdt. I.W.J. Hendriks, M.Th
- Wkl. Sekum : Pdt. J. Ospara, S.Th
- Visitator : Pdt. D. Lohenapessy
- Pdt. W. Davidz, M.Th
- Pdt. L. Lohy, S.Th

Staff BPH Sinode GPM:

- Sek.Dep.Kekes : Pdt.E.P. Kaihena, S.Th
- Pdt. W. Davidz, M.Th (Pjs)
- Pdt. Ny. A. Maail (Pjs)
- Sek.Dep.Pelpem : Pdt. Drs. A. Rehawarin
- Sek.Dep.Finek : Pdt. D.E. Warella
- Dir.LPJ-GPM : Pdt. D.S. Izaak, S.Th

1986–1990

- Ketua : Pdt. A.J. Soplantila, S.Th
- Wakil Ketua : Pdt. I.W.J. Hendriks, M.Th
- Sekum : Pdt. J. Ospara, S.Th
- Wkl. Sekum : Pdt. J. Pattipawae, S.Th
- Pdt. L. Lohy, S.Th (Pjs)
- Visitator : Pdt. M.J. Wattimena, S.Th
- Pdt. W. Davidz, M.Th
- Pdt. L. Lohy, S.Th

Staff BPH Sinode GPM:

- Sek.Dep.Kekes : Pdt. A.D. Maelissa, S.Th
- Sek.Dep.Pelpem : Pdt. Ny.A. Maail
- Sek.Dep.Finek : Pdt. D.E. Warells
- Dir.LPJ-GPM : Pdt. D.S. Izaak, S.Th

1990–1995 (Reorganisasi Struktur dan Kepemimpinan GPM (III))

- Ketua : Pdt. A.J. Soplantila, S.Th
- Wakil Ketua : Pdt. Ny. A. Maail, S.Th
- Sekum : Pdt. S.P. Titaley, S.Th
- Wkl. Sekum : Pdt. S.J. Mailoa, S.Th
- Anggota : Pdt. M.J. Wattimena, M.Th
- Pdt. J. de Queljoe, S.Th
- Pnt. Drs. G. Sabono

Staff BPH Sinode GPM:

- Sek.Dep.Kekes : Pdt. A.D. Maelissa, S.Th
- Sek.Dep.Pelpem : Pdt. Ny. A. Maail
- Sek.Dep.Finek : Pdt. D.E. Warella
- Dir LPJ-GPM : Pdt. S.J. Mailoa, S.Th

1995–2000

- Ketua : Pdt. S.P. Titaley, S.Th
- Wakil Ketua : Pdt. L. Lohy, S.Th
- Sekum : Pdt. M.M. Siahaya, S.Th
- Wkl. Sekum : Pdt. J. de Queljoe, S.Th

Anggota : Pdt. W. Davidz, M.Th

- Pdt. Ny.A. Maail
- Pnt. I.M. Pesireron

Staff BPH Sinode GPM:

- Sek.Dep.Kekes : Pdt. Ny. J. Komul-Pattiasina, S.Th
- Sek.PIKOM : Pdt. A.D. Maelissa, S.Th
- Sek.Dep.Pelpem : Pdt. Chr. Sahetapy, S.Th
- Pdt. W. Homy, Sm.Th (pengganti)
- Sek.Dep.Finek : Pdt. D.E. Warella
- Pdt. J. Tuhumena, S.Th (pengganti)
- Dir. LPJ-GPM : Pdt. W. Davidz, M.Th

2000–2005

- Ketua : Pdt. DR. I.W.J. Hendriks
- Wkl. Ket. I : Pdt. L. Lohy, S.Th
- Wkl. Ket II : Pdt. H.L. Leleury, Sm.Th
- Sekum : Pdt. S.J. Mailoa, M.Th
- Wkl. Sekum : Pdt. W. Davidz, M.Th
- Anggota : Pdt. M.M. Siahaya, S.Th
- Pdt. Ny. J. Komul-Pattiasina, S.Th
- Pnt. Drs. J. Labetubun

Staff BPH Sinode GPM:

- Sek.Dep. Kekes : Pdt. Ny. D.C. Manuputty, SIP
- Sek. PIKOM : Pdt. A.D. Maelissa, S.Th
- Sek.Dep.Finek : Pdt. J. Tuhumena, S.Th
- Dir.LPJ-GPM : Pdt. A. Rumthe, S.Th

2005–2010 (terjadi Sentralisasi Keuangan GPM 70:30%, Hasil Keputusan BPL ke-31 Tahun 2008 di Tual)

- Ketua : Pdt. DR. John Ruhulessin, M.Si
- Wakil Ketua I : Pdt. Dr. M.M. Hendriks-Ririmasse
- Wakil Ketua II : Pdt. J. Manuhutu, S.Th
- Sekum : Pdt. V. Untailawan, M.Th
- Wkl. Sekum : Pdt. Drs. A.J.S. Werinussa, M.Si
- Anggota : Pdt. A. Orno, S.Si
- Pnt. J. de Queljoe, S.Th
- Pnt. Ir. Ny. M. Soukotta, M.Sc

Staff BPH Sinode GPM:

- Sek.Dep.Kekes : Pdt. Ny. P. Ruhulessin, S.Th
- Pdt. N. Taberima, S.Th (penggantian)
- Sek.Dep.Pelpem : Pdt. C. Leunufna, Sm.Th, SH
- Sek.Dep.Finek : Pdt. J. Teslatu, M.Si
- Sek.Dep.PIKOM : Pdt. Drs. H. Lekahena
- Dir. LPJ-GPM : Pdt. Ny. D.C. Manuputty, SIP

== Annual Church meeting ==
Every year the church has an annual meeting (Sidang MPL) where plans are made for the next following year. This meeting usually happens in November of each year. Location of annual meeting:

- 2009: Larat, Tanimbar islands
- 2010: Latuhalat, Ambon
- 2011: Dobo, Aru islands
- 2012: Tepa, Babar island
- 2013: Taniwel, Seram island
- 2014: Lafa, Seram island
- 2015: Sidang MPL in Ambon at the Joseph Kam church building; Sidang Sinode in Ambon at the Maranatha church building

(both meetings ended up being held in January 2016)

Every five years at the big church meeting (Sidang Raya MPL) new board members are chosen. Each board member can serve for a maximum of two consecutive terms. This meeting is always in Ambon.

The church currently [when?] has 575,000 members and 775 congregations, with over 750 pastors in 33 church districts throughout Maluku and part of North Maluku.
