= Robert Churchill =

Robert Churchill may refer to:

- Robert W. Churchill (born 1947), American politician and lawyer in Illinois
- Robert Paul Churchill, American philosopher and ethicist
- Robert Churchill, founder of Churchill Films

== See also ==
- Bob Churchill (John Robert Churchill), British rifle shooter
