= Duane Cady =

American philosopher (born 1946)

- Born: Duane L. Cady; 1946

Education
- Education: Hamline University (BA), Brown University (MA, PhD)
- Thesis: Knowledge in Plato’s Theaetetus (1971)
- Doctoral advisor: J. William Lenz
- Other advisors: Roderick M. Chisholm, Joseph Norio Uemura

Philosophical work
- Era: 21st-century philosophy
- Region: Western philosophy
- Institutions: Hamline University
- Website: https://duanelcady.com

Duane L. Cady (born 1946) is an American philosopher and Professor Emeritus of Philosophy at Hamline University where he was Paul Robert & Jean Shuman Hanna Professor of Philosophy between 1996 and 1999. Cady is known for his works on pacifism. In 1991 he served as the president of the Concerned Philosophers for Peace in North America. A festschrift in his honor was published in 2012. Cady was a nominee for the Grawemeyer World Order Award in 1991.

== Books ==
- From Warism to Pacifism: A Moral Continuum, Temple University Press, 1989, 2nd Edition, 2010
- Moral Vision: How Everyday Life Shapes Ethical Thinking, Rowman & Littlefield, 2005
- Humanitarian Intervention: Just War vs. Pacifism, with Robert L. Phillips, Rowman & Littlefield, 1996
- Just War, Nonviolence & Nuclear Deterrence: Philosophers on War And Peace, co-edited with Richard Werner, Longwood Academic, 1991
- Natural Reason: Essays in Honor of Joseph Norio Uemura, co-edited with Ronald E. Beanblossom, Hamline University Press, 1992
- Bringing Peace Home: Feminism, Violence, and Nature, co-edited with Karen J. Warren, Indiana University Press, 1996
