= Jin (Chinese surname) =

- Language: Chinese

Origin
- Meaning: "gold"
- Region of origin: China

Other names
- Variant forms: Chin; Gyim; Kam; Kym; Kim; Kheng

Jin is the Hanyu pinyin transliteration of a number of Chinese surnames. The most common one, Jīn 金, literally means "gold" and is 29th in the list of "Hundred Family Surnames". As of 2006, it is ranked the 64th most common Chinese surname and is sometimes transliterated as Chin.

The other, less common, surnames that are "Jin" in pinyin include Jìn (晋/晉) and Jìn (靳).

== 金 (Jīn) ==
=== Mythology ===
Jin is an ancient surname, dating back over 4,000 years. It was first mentioned during the period ruled by the Yellow Emperor, a legendary Chinese sovereign and cultural hero, who is considered in Chinese mythology to be the ancestor of all Han Chinese. The legend behind the Jin surname is as follows:

The Yellow Emperor's son, Yi Zhi (Shaohao), eventually succeeded him. On the same day he was installed as leader, a golden phoenix flew down and perched on top of a house exactly opposite of where he sat. His followers reckoned it was an auspicious beginning. They decided to use gold as the emblem of their tribe. Yi Zhi was retitled Jin Tian Shi ("golden skies") by his people, and headed the Jin Tian Tribe. Their settlement was located in Qufu (presently Qufu city in Shandong province). Yi Zhi died in 2515 BCE. Some of his descendants adopted Jin as their surnames and left off the words Tian Shi ("skies").

The surname also appeared in an area called Pengcheng (now known as Tong Shan Xian) during the Han dynasty, from 206 BCE to 220 BCE.

=== Origin of Surname Jīn (金) ===
- Jin Midi (金日磾) was with the Xiongnu people during the Han dynasty and received the surname Jīn (金) from Emperor Wu. His father, Xiutu (休屠) was a general-feudal lord of the Xiongnu. Jin Xuan (金旋) and Jin Yi (金禕) were his descendants.
- Qiang people use the surnames Jīn (金), Chang (羌), Gong (功), and Ju-Goo (俱).
- Some of Qian Liu's (錢鏐) descendants received the surname Jīn (金).
- Jin was among the surnames granted to the Kaifeng Jews by an unnamed Song dynasty emperor.
- During the Yuan dynasty, the Chinese Liu (劉) clan received the surname Jīn (金). Jīn Fuxiang (金覆祥).
- Mongolian Ye (也) clan got the surname Jīn (金) during the Ming dynasty
- Taiwanese aborigines received surname Jīn (金), Zhang, amongst others, during the Qing dynasty.
- Aisin Gioro clan got the surname Jīn (金), as "Aisin" means "gold" in Manchu language, following the fall of the Qing dynasty.
- Jin uses the same character as the Korean surname, "Kim". Kim is Korea's most common surname and is also widely found amongst the ethnic Koreans in China.

=== Notables with the surname 金 ===
- Jin Midi (金日磾)
- Jin Shengtan (金聖嘆) (born Jin Renrui 金人瑞)
- Jin Yuelin (金岳霖)
- Jin Yugang (金玉刚), Chinese convicted murderer executed in Singapore
- Jin Di (sport shooter) (金迪)
- Jin Jing (金晶)
- Jin Fengling (金鳳玲)
- Jin Guliang (金古良), painter of the Wu Shuang Pu
- Jin Jingdao (金敬道)
- Jin Liqun (金立群)
- Keyu Jin
- Jin Luxian (金鲁贤), bishop of Shanghai
- Jin Xing (金星)
- Jin Li (金力)
- Larry Wu-tai Chin
- Jin Renqing (金人慶)
- Jin Yubo (金煜博)
- Jin Zhiyang (金志扬)
- Elaine Jin (金燕玲)
- Ha Jin (born Jin Xuefei 金雪飛)
- Jin Chen Gina Jin (金晨), actress
- Jin Yuzhang, of the Aisin-Gioro house
- Jin Yong, penname used by Louis Cha
- Jin Boyang
- Jin Shan
- Jin Sha (singer)
- Jin Sha (poet), Cheng Youshu
- Deborah Jin (Jin Xiulan 金秀兰), physicist
- Jin Shuren
- Jin Youzhi
- Jin Qicong
- Kinsen (金川 Jin Chuan), the voice actor for Xiao in Genshin Impact
- Michelle Jin (米歇尔·金), professional bodybuilder
- Zhi Jin (金芝), Chinese computer scientist
- Benjamin Kheng (金文明), Singaporean singer-songwriter
- Narelle Kheng (金颂旖), Singaporean singer and actress
- Imperial Noble Consort Shujia (淑嘉皇贵妃), consort of the Qianlong Emperor and the only Qing Dynasty consort of Korean Heritage

==== Cultural works ====
- The Untamed (TV series), features the Jin clan as one of the main groups in the series

=== Variants ===
- Chin, an alternate transliteration of Jin
- Gyim, Kim in Middle Chinese
- Kin in Fuzhou dialect
- Gam, Kam in Cantonese
- Gim, Kim in Korea
- Kim in Hakka and Min Nan variations
- Kim in Vietnamese

== 靳 (Jìn) ==
According to legend, Jìn (靳) family name originated from Zhurong. It was later a clan in the Chu (state). Originally the name was Jian-Jin (篯), but was later changed to Jian-Qian (錢) and Jìn (靳).

=== Notables with the surname 靳 ===
- Yue-Sai Kan (靳羽西)
- Jin Dong (Chinese: 靳东, born 1976), Chinese actor, known for his television roles in Legend of Entrepreneurship (2012)
- Jin Ye (靳烨; Jìn Yè; born 1988), Chinese dancer, model and beauty pageant titleholder who was crowned as Miss Universe
- Jin Ruchao, (靳如超, 1960–2001) perpetrator of the Shijiazhuang bombings
- Jin Zhun (靳準) (died 318), official of the Chinese/Xiongnu state Han-Zhao, who in 318 staged a coup against the Han-Zhao emperor and his son-in-law
- Empress Jin (靳皇后/金皇后) may refer to one of the following Chinese empresses: Jin Yueguang (靳月光) and Jin Yuehua (靳月華), two of Han-Zhao emperor Liu Cong's
- Jin Yunpeng (靳云鹏; 1877–1951), Chinese general and politician
- Jin Hui (Chinese: 靳辉; born 1988), Chinese footballer who plays for Beijing Renhe in the China League One
- Andrew Jin Daoyuan (Chinese: 靳道远; 1929–2019), bishop of the Chinese Patriotic Catholic Association
- Jin Guidi (靳贵第; 1915–1937), or Chin Kuai-Ti, Chinese soldier and boxer
- Jin Xi (Han), (靳歙), general under Emperor Liu Bang who in 209 BC, "joined in the attack on Qin forces, defeating Li You"
- Empress Jin (Yin), (靳皇后, personal name unknown), briefly an empress of the Chinese/Xiongnu state Han-Zhao, wife of Liu Can (Emperor Yin)

== 晋/晉 (Jìn) ==
Jìn (晋 family name originate from Táng Shū Yú (唐叔虞) the brother of King Wu of Zhou. He founded the state of Jin and his later descendants used the surname Jìn (晋).

=== Notables with the surname 晋 ===
- Jin Xiaomei (晋小梅)
