= County of Hohenems =

Historic county of the Holy Roman Empire

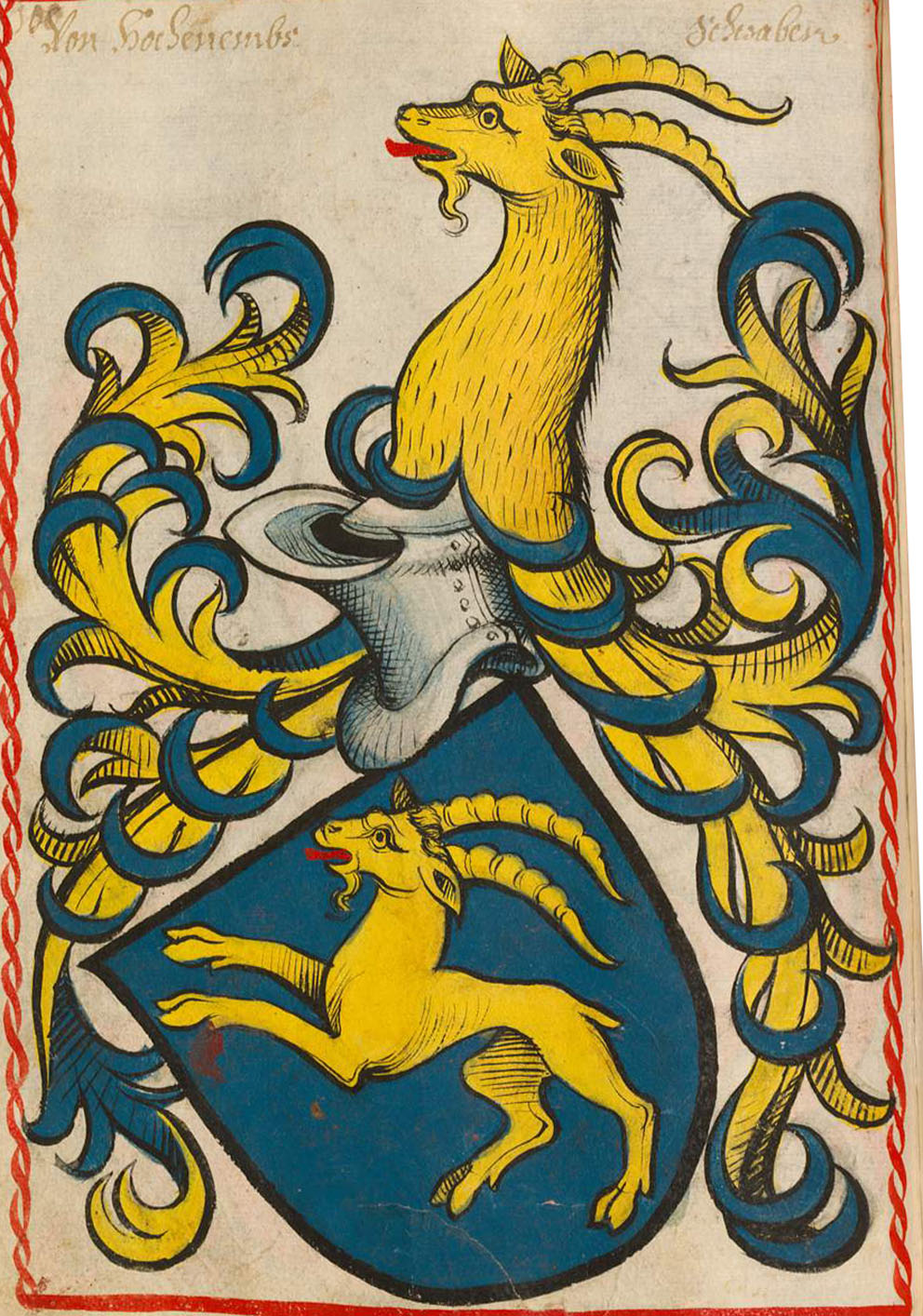
Coat of arms of the counts of Hohenems

The County of Hohenems, located in the Rhine Valley of what is now Voralberg, western Austria, developed as a Free Imperial County under the direct authority of the Holy Roman Emporer.

== History ==
The County of Hohenems and the town of Hohenems early development is attributed to Count Kaspar of Hohenems (1573-1640). Count Kaspar of Hohenems developed the town as a political and architectural centre, he completed a Renaissance-style palace which began construction in 1562. The design was by Italian architect Martino Longo. He relocated his court to the new palace and further developed the settlement into a residence with a palace, park and zoollogical garden, and established Hohenems as the seat of a Free Imperial County.

As the Holy Roman Empire weakened and larger territories such as Austria, Prussia, Bavaria, Würtemmberg, and Baden consolidated power, small polities like Hohenems faced ongoing pressure to avoid absorption.

Parts of the county such as Vaduz had to be sold by the family because of bankruptcy. However, Hohenems was one of few non-Austrian enclaves within the present-day Voralberg to resist incorporation into Habsburg territory, it retained its independent status until 1759, when Count Franz Willhelm III (the third) died without a male heir in 1759, the county came under suzerainty of the House of Habsburg who annexed the county.

The head of the House of Habsburg continued carrying the title of "Count of Hohenems" in the grand title of the Emperor of Austria.

== Economics of The County of Hohenems ==
The County of Hohenems under Count Kaspar of Hohenems (1573-1640) pursuid policies aimed at population growth and an increase in the size of the tax base of the county. In 1605 he issued a Marktprivileg (tax incentive) establishing a place of trade on the newly founded Thomprobstengasse (later Christengasse), and offered a release from serfdom to Christian craftsmen and traders who settled there. In 1617 he issued a Schutzbrief (edict of protection) inviting Jewish traders and moneylenders to settle in the county, to promote commerce; correspondence with his brother Markus Sitticus shows this intent predated the formal charter.

Count Kaspar offered the Jewish settlers accommodation in a separate area from Christengasse, and the site he indicated in 1617 corresponds with the later location of the Jewish quarter, whose main streets, the Judengasse and Christengasse, remain the centre of the old town into the twentieth century.
