= Robert Paul Churchill =

American philosopher and academic

Prof. Robert Paul Churchill
- Occupations: Philosopher, ethicist, logician, educator, author, and academic
- Years active: 1974–present
- Title: Elton Professor

Academic background
- Education: B.A. (Liberal Arts, 1969), M.A. (Philosophy 1973), PhD (Philosophy 1975)
- Alma mater: Johns Hopkins University
- Thesis: Civil Disobedience: Definition and Justification (1975)
- Doctoral advisor: Maurice Mandelbaum

Academic work
- Discipline: Philosophy
- Sub-discipline: ethics, politics, logic
- Institutions: George Washington University
- Main interests: Ethics, global studies, ethnic violence, terrorism, war, gender violence, masculinity, history of western philosophy, poverty, human rights, social and political philosophy
- Notable works: Human Rights and Global Diversity: Basic Ethics in Action; Women in the Crossfire: Understanding and Ending Honor Killing

Robert Paul Churchill is an American philosopher, ethicist, logician, educator, author, and academic. Churchill's career at George Washington University spanned forty two years from 1975 to 2017. He served as Elton Professor of Philosophy at GWU from 2014 to 2017, and as chair of the department of philosophy twice (1986–1988 and 1992–1994), and as director of the peace studies program from 1997 to 2001. Churchill was the president of Concerned Philosophers for Peace from 2004 until 2005, and the American Society for Value Inquiry, and the founder of the Society for Philosophy in the Contemporary World and its director for eight years.

Churchill is known for his work, often interdisciplinary, on human rights, war, ethics, logic, politics, and social philosophy.

== Bibliography ==
=== Select books ===
- Women in the Crossfire: Understanding and Ending Honor Killing, (Oxford and New York: Oxford University Press, June, 2018
- Human Rights and Global Diversity, (Upper Saddle River, NJ: Pearson/Prentice Hall, 2006), 152 pp. Pub. rights acquired 2014 by Routledge/Taylor & Francis (Note: E-book version issued 2016)
- Human Rights and Political Obligations, SafariX Online content from Human Rights and Global Diversity. Upper Saddle River, NJ: Pearson/Prentice Hall, 2006
- Democracy, Social Values and Public Policy, ed. and intro., with Milton Carrow and Joseph Cordes. (Westport, CT: Praeger Publishers, 1998), 291 pp.
- The Ethics of Liberal Democracy: Morality and Democracy in Theory and Practice, ed. and intro., (New York and London: Berg Publishers, 1994). Pub. rights acquired 2012 by Bloomsbury Academic, 209 pp.
- Logic: An Introduction, 2nd Rev. ed. of Becoming Logical, (New York: St. Martin's Press, 1990), 635 pp. Pub. rights acquired 1996 by Wadsworth/Thomson, and then Palgrave Macmillan.
- Becoming Logical: An Introduction to Logic, (New York: St. Martin's Press, 1986), 595 pp

=== Select papers and book chapters ===
- "Human Rights and International Law," Handbook of Nonviolence and Pacifism, Andrew Fiala, ed. New York: Taylor & Francis/Routledge, 2018.
- “Mythology, Mental Health, and a Culture of Violence,” Philosophy in the Contemporary World 23, no. 2 (Fall 2017).
- "Salvaging Human Rights: A Critical Commentary on Michael Boylan’s Theory of Natural Human Rights," Journal of Applied Ethics and Philosophy 8, no. 2 (Fall 2016), 33–40.
- "Salvaging Human Rights: A Critical Commentary on Michael Boylan’s Theory of Natural Human Rights," Journal of Applied Ethics and Philosophy 8, no. 2 (Fall 2016), 33–40
- "Liberal Toleration," The Bloomsbury Companion to Political Philosophy, edited by Andrew Fiala. London and New York, 2015, pp. 139–53.
- "The Ethics of Teaching and the Emergence of MOOCS: Should Philosophers Support the MOOC?" Philosophy in the Contemporary World 21, no. 1 (Spring 2014), pp. 1–14.
- "Becoming Moral Agents: On the Personal and Communal Worldview Imperatives," Morality and Justice, Reading Boylan's A Just Society, John-Stewart Gordon, ed. Lanham and London: Lexington Books, 2009, pp. 15–29.
- "Moral Toleration and Deep Reconciliation," Philosophy in the Contemporary World 14, no. 1 (Spring 2007), 99–113.
- "Is There a Paradox of Altruism?" co-authored with Erin Street, The Ethics of Altruism, Jonathan Seglow, ed., (London: Frank Cass Publishers, 2004). (Note: Reprint of 2002 article.)
- "Wars for Human Rights: Do They Violate National Sovereignty?" Sensabilities: La Roche College Center for the Study of Ethics 4, no. 1 (Fall 2000), pp. 1, −6-7.
