= Concerned Philosophers for Peace =

Organization of professional philosophers

Concerned Philosophers For Peace (CPP) is an organization of professional philosophers founded in 1981. It is the "largest and most active organization of professional philosophers in North America oriented to the critique of militarism and the search for a just and lasting peace." The organization sponsors an annual conference, as well as programs at meetings of the American Philosophical Association.

Over the decades, several noted scholars specializing in the study of peace have served as President of the organization including: Duane Cady (1991-1992), Robert L. Holmes (1992-1993), Robert Paul Churchill (2004-2005) and Barry L. Gan (2006-2007).
