= Women in the Crossfire =

2018 book by Robert Paul Churchill

- Cover
- Author: Robert Paul Churchill
- Original title: Women in the Crossfire: Understanding and Ending Honor Killing
- Language: English
- Subject: Honor killing, gender studies, philosophy, religious studies
- Genre: Non-fiction
- Publisher: Oxford University Press
- Publication date: 6 September 2018
- Publication place: United States
- Pages: 352
- ISBN: 9780190468569

Women in the Crossfire: Understanding and Ending Honor Killing is a book by author, academic, and philosopher Robert Paul Churchill. It was published in 2018 by Oxford University Press and named by Choice as an Outstanding Academic Title the same year. The book explores the deeply rooted social practice of honor killing, analyzing its historical, cultural, and psychological aspects. Churchill aims to shed light on the causes of honor killing, drawing from original research and proposing methods for prevention to protect girls and women from falling victim to this tragic phenomenon.

== Summary ==
Churchill meticulously examines the complex phenomenon of honor killings. The book is structured into nine chapters, starting with an exploration of honor killing and empirical research on the subject. Churchill delves into the social realities of honor, addressing the role of socialization, gender dynamics, and the concept of violence-prone personality. The connection between warrior masculinity and female victimization is discussed in depth. The book also explores the cultural evolution of honor killing over time. Churchill proposes strategies for providing protection, leveraging reform, and ultimately achieving moral transformation by removing honor from the practice of honor killing. The final chapters focus on the sustainability of moral transformation and the importance of community ownership in bringing about change. The book offers a comprehensive understanding of honor killing, combining conceptual rigor, empirical research, and a call for moral revolution to end this deeply entrenched social issue.

== Reviews ==
In his review, philosopher of religion and academic Professor Ivan Strenski (Note: From the University of California, Riverside) praised the book for its conceptual rigor, clarity, and exhaustive description of honor killing. He commended Churchill's exploration of the deep-rooted cultural and social aspects surrounding honor killing, emphasizing the book's focus on understanding and ending this practice. Strenski acknowledged Churchill's moral condemnation of honor killing, calling it "immoral" and highlighting the author's commitment to a "moral revolution" to end this societal issue. Despite discussing the evolutionary perspective on the origins of honor killing, Strenski raised questions about the certainty of its deep antiquity. Strenski lauded the author for stressing the grim reality of honor killing and appreciated his approach to address the issue from within the cultural context.

Strenski wrote:

I cannot think of another book that has moved me to such sadness as Churchill’s. Without even putting faces on its victims, Churchill forces readers to come to terms with the anguish and desperation of its women victims. They die lonely, wretched, demeaning deaths by the thousands each year. A powerful witness to their plight, Churchill’s achievement is great, especially considering subject matter that tries the human spirit. In all honesty, nothing that Churchill could—or should—have done could change this. The fact that honor killing has ever existed, and indeed continues to exist (at the rate of 20,000 per year) cannot but sicken us to mourn our hapless far-flung sisters.

Professor of law Sital Kalantry (Note: Professor of Law at Cornell Law School and the founder of the India Center.) welcomed Churchill's focused approach on this specific form of gender-based violence, and said it allows for deeper insights into its history, causes, and solutions. Highlighting the author's thorough empirical, cultural, psychological, and historical analysis, she commended the examination of reported cases and the identification of common characteristics. While acknowledging the importance of existing proposals, Kalantry found Churchill's emphasis on moral change within communities, translated into initiatives like education programs and empowering women, to be particularly intriguing for addressing long-term solutions to eradicate violence against women.
