= Jewish ghetto =

Jewish ghetto(s) can refer to:

- Jewish ghettos established by Nazi Germany
- Jewish ghettos in Europe of early Modern Era
- Jewish quarter (diaspora) worldwide
- Shanghai Ghetto, China

== See also ==
- Jewish Quarter (disambiguation)
