= Kamm =

Kamm, Kamp is a German or Jewish surname, from the German word for "comb", most likely a metonymic occupational surname for a comb maker, or a wool comber.

Kamm is also an alternative form of the surname Kam, Kahm, Cam, Cahm (קם), from Middle High German kâm "mould".

Notable people with the surname include:

- Wunibald Kamm (1893–1966), automotive engineer, known for the Kamm tail
- Willie Kamm (1900–1988), baseball player
- Antony Kamm (1931–2011), English publisher and writer.
- Frances Kamm (b. c. 1948), American philosopher
- William Kamm (b. 1950), leader of a Catholic sect
- John Kamm, American businessman and human rights activist
- Oliver Kamm (b. 1963) British writer
- Kris Kamm (b. 1964), American actor
- John Kamm (entrepreneur) (b. 1971)
- Anat Kamm (b. 1987), Israeli journalist involved in the Anat Kamm–Uri Blau affair

== See also ==
- Roter Kamm crater
