= Andrew Kam =

Hong Kong businessman

- Born: Hong Kong
- Occupations: Vice President, Wanda Cultural Industry Group Unit, Dalian Wanda

Andrew Kam (Chinese: 金民豪) is the current vice president of Dalian Wanda's Wanda Cultural Industry Group unit. He is the former Managing Director of Hong Kong Disneyland.

== Career ==
He went to primary and secondary school in Hong Kong before graduating with a business degree at Dalhousie University in Canada in 1984 and a masters in business management in 1986.

Kam then worked as deputy general manager of Coca-Cola China from 1988. He joined the Hong Kong Tourism Board in 2000. In 2001 he joined Swire Pacific Limited as their Sales and Marketing Director, looking after the company's business in Fujian. Andrew Kam was then recruited by Cofco Coca-Cola Beverages and worked on their 14 different markets in China.

=== As managing director of Hong Kong Disneyland ===
He started the role of managing director at Hong Kong Disneyland in August 2008, replacing Bill Ernest, who was promoted to President and Managing Director, Asia, for Walt Disney Parks & Resorts. Under his leadership, Hong Kong Disneyland has achieved the first positive EBITDA in 2010, pulling the park out of a long-term deficit since the park's opening in 2005. On March 7, 2016, Hong Kong Disneyland announced the resignation of him as the managing director for ‘personal reasons.’ and will be replaced by Samuel Lau.

=== Dalian Wanda ===
In October 2016, Andrew Kam joined Dalian Wanda as vice president of its Wanda Cultural Industry Group unit. Wanda plans to build as many as 15 Wanda City theme parks across China to encircle Shanghai Disneyland and compete for the entertainment spending of the country's growing middle class households.

== Personal life ==
Kam is married with a daughter and a son, named Caitlin and Nicholas.
