= Jewish Quarter =

Jewish Quarter may refer to:

- Jewish quarter (diaspora), areas of many cities and towns traditionally inhabited by Jews
- Jewish Quarter (Jerusalem), one of the four traditional quarters of the Old City of Jerusalem
- Jewish Quarter (Spanish: Barrio de los Judíos), a popular name for Villa Muñoz, Montevideo
- Mellah, a walled Jewish quarter of a city in Morocco

== See also ==
- Jewish ghetto (disambiguation)
- Jewish Quarterly, UK literary and cultural magazine
- The Jewish Quarterly Review, Jewish studies journal
