= Roray Kam =

Roray Kam (born Dec 27, 1961) is a surfer, a multiple-time winner of longboard surfing competitions and an early participant in stand up paddle boarding in South Florida. He is a surfing coach and the founder of RK Ocean Gear, and in 2013 resides in Fort Lauderdale, FL and works for the Broward County Sherriff's Office. Kam has hosted a number of Stand Up Paddleboard (SUP) events and races.

== Early life and education ==
Kam was born in The Big Island of Hawaii. As a child he joined his father Raymond Kam in surfing, outrigger paddling, diving and fishing. Kam entered the surfing competition circuit at the young age of 12, and placed in many surfing competitions in Hawaii as a young teenager.

== Career ==
In 1982 Kam moved to South Florida for a job opportunity. In 1983 began competing in longboard competitions there, winning his first contest.

During the 80's, Kam competed in the Professional Longboard Association (PLA) Tour and the Eastern Surfing Association (ESA) competitions. In the ESA, he competed in both longboard and shortboard events, and was often placed on the podium. With multiple regional events under his belt, Kam also advanced to the U.S. Open of Surfing in California. Kam was the East Coast longboard champion from year 1991 through 1994.

After a period of five years without competing, in 2003 Kam returned to surfing and won 13 tournaments.

In 2005, Kam was an early participant in the Stand Up Paddleboard (SUP) movement in South Florida. Right after Ark Paddleboards first founded, Kam was sponsored as a team rider and was involved in board designing and development; as a result, Ark Paddleboards released the Kam Islander model and the Kam Pro model boards.

Within two years, Stand Up Paddleboarding had gained enough popularity that races were organized. Kam competed in a number of these, including the 6-hour Molokai to Oahu Paddle Race Championship in 2010, where he placed third overall in the stock division and first in his age group. Kam was the first SUP racer from Florida to enter the race.

Kam began studying raceboard design and participated in development of boards, including Ark race boards and the Jimmy Lewis Slice model race board, which was tested by Kam at the Battle of Paddle Race in 2010. Kam took second in the open class.

In 2010 Kam completed the Ka'iwi Channel crossing. Between late 2011 and 2012 Kam went through extensive surgery and recovery for his shoulder. During his recovery period Kam hosted and emceed Florida SUP race events, including the US Open of Standup Paddle at Miami Beach in 2011. In 2013 Kam fully recovered and placed first overall in the 14-foot class at the Virginia Key Ocean Challenge on June 29, 2013.

In 2011, Kam signed with Starboard as team rider and South Florida liaison. In 2012 he won a kayak fishing prize at the Extreme Kayak September Slam. He continues to compete in various surfing and SUP events.

Kam is seen each December surfing in a Santa suit on Fort Lauderdale beaches.

In 2015, Kam was the coach of a local Special Olympics standup paddleboarding team.
