= John Kamm (entrepreneur) =

American funeral industry entrepreneur

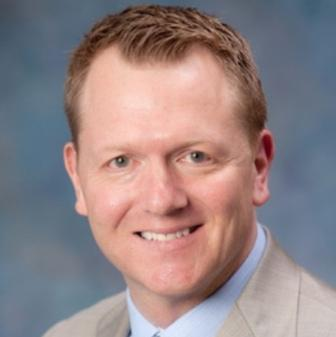
- John_Kamm_Linked_Investments_Ltd
- Born: 1971 (age 54–55); Omaha, Nebraska
- Occupations: Founder Linked Investments, Ltd and All Nations Society Corp

John Kamm (born 1971) is an American entrepreneur who founded All Nations Society Corp., a Tokyo-based company that sells prearranged funeral services. The model was common in the United States and relatively new in Asia.

He started the company in June 2003.

== Early life and education ==
Kamm was born in Omaha, Nebraska in 1971. His father's work as a city administrator moved the family around the country before they settled in Denver, where Kamm later earned his degrees.

Kamm's father Tom Kamm was a city administrator who had to follow assignments around the country. John’s family lived in many cities before winding up in Denver, Colorado, where he earned his degrees.

Kamm earned an undergraduate degree in geology and a minor in mathematics from the University of Colorado Denver. In 2001 he migrated to Japan for an MBA at Waseda University in a bid to gain entry into the Asian gold mining industry. His MBA thesis served as the platform for his startup.

== All Nations Society Corp ==
Kamm decided to start the preneed funeral business (sei zen yoyaku) in Japan after researching the funeral industry in Japan. He predicted that demand for smaller funeral services would increase in future years, especially in big cities like Tokyo, where baby boomers from other areas tend to have fewer friends and family members left at their final moments. Kamm claimed his preneed business model was in response to many domestic funeral businesses' questionable sales tactics as well. Consumers reported being "cheated" by funeral homes, who presented lower service prices at beginning, and then pressured add-on sales until ended up charging millions of yen. Kamm's company offers a detailed price list of service options that allow consumers to choose service content and budget the expense, unlike Japanese companies that typically charge a fixed all-in-one fee. To distinguish himself from the traditional Japanese funeral business practice, Kamm promoted his company core values as "Transparency, Accountability, Dignity, Individuality."

In 2003, Japanese Prime Minister Junichiro Koizumi pronounced the initiative to double foreign direct investment into Japan. Japan's new efforts to ease the foreign business's entrance to Japan benefited Kamm's venture. Kamm's new company, All Nations Society Corp, received help from the Japan External Trade Organization, that provides free professional services and office space for foreign startup companies. Kamm also has an alliance with an old world funeral parlor group called Sogi-hyaku-to-ban, meaning "Funerals 110," which is the emergency number that Japanese can call when they need assistance.
