= Zhi Jin =

Chinese computer scientist

Zhi Jin (Chinese: 金芝, born 1962) is a Chinese computer scientist whose research involves knowledge-based systems and adaptive systems for requirements engineering and software engineering. She is a professor of computer science at Peking University and deputy director of the Key Lab of High-Confidence Software Technologies, sponsored by the Chinese Ministry of Education.

== Education and career ==
Jin was born in 1962 in Xiuning. She earned a bachelor's degree in 1984, from Zhejiang University. She completed her Ph.D. in 1992 at the National University of Defense Technology, under the supervision of Hu Shouren.

She was a professor in the Institute of Mathematics of the Chinese Academy of Sciences from 2001 to 2009, before taking her present position at Peking University in 2009.

== Recognition ==
Jin was a 1997 winner of the Software China Talent Award. She is a Fellow of the China Computer Federation (CCF), elected in 2012, and a 2021 recipient of the CCF Xia-Peisu Award. She was a distinguished speaker of the IEEE Computer Society for 2019–2021, and was named as a 2023 IEEE Fellow, "for significant contributions to knowledge-driven software development".
