= Barry L. Gan =

American academic

- Born: 1948 (age 76–77)
- Education: B.A. University of Rochester, 1970 M.A. University of Rochester, 1981 Ph.D., University of Rochester, 1984
- Occupation: Academic
- Employer: St. Bonaventure University

Barry L. Gan (born 1948) is an American academic. He is Professor Emeritus of Philosophy at St. Bonaventure University. From 1986 until 2020 he directed the Center for Nonviolence, formerly the Peace Studies program at St. Bonaventure University. For twenty-six years, from 1990 to 2016, he was editor of The Acorn: Journal of the Gandhi-King Society, now called The Acorn: Philosophical Studies in Pacifism and Nonviolence. For two years in the 1990s he served as program committee chair of the Fellowship of Reconciliation, the oldest and largest interfaith peace group in the United States, and also served from 2006 until 2009 as co-editor of Peace and Change, a quarterly journal of peace research. In addition, he served as the president of Concerned Philosophers for Peace from 2006 until 2007.

== Selected works ==
- Gan, Barry L.; Holmes, Robert L., eds. (2012). Nonviolence in Theory and Practice. Chicago: Waveland Press. ISBN 978-1577663492. OCLC 836156316.
- Gan, Barry L. (2013). Violence and Nonviolence: An Introduction. Lanham, Maryland: Rowman & Littlefield Publishers. ISBN 9781442217591. OCLC 861061011.
