= Joseph Norio Uemura =

American philosopher

- Born: July 3, 1926; Portland, Oregon
- Died: March 3, 2016 (aged 89)

Philosophical work
- Era: 21st-century philosophy
- Region: Western philosophy
- Institutions: Hamline University

Joseph Norio Uemura (July 3, 1926 ــ March 3, 2016) was an American philosopher and Paul Robert and Jean Schuman Hanna Professor of Philosophy, Emeritus at Hamline University. A festschrift in his honor was published in 1992.

== Books ==
- Reflections on the Mind of Plato: Six Dialogues, Agora Publications 2004
- Seven Dialogues on Goodness, 1986
