= Valery Kan =

Russian politician (born 1978)

Valery Vladimirovich Kan (Russian: Валерий Владимирович Кан; born 21 August 1978) is a Russian politician with the United Russia party.

== Early life and career ==
Kan was born in Tashkent, Uzbek SSR, Soviet Union (present Uzbekistan) to Koryo-saram parents, and has been active in promoting economic cooperation between Ussuriysk and South Korea. He moved to Ussuriysk, Primorsky Krai in 1994, and joined the United Russia party in 2003. He was elected a deputy of the urban Duma of Ussuriysk; just 25 years old then, he was the youngest member of that body. In 2007, he was elected a member of the Legislative Assembly of Primorsky Krai.

== Soulfly controversy ==
Brazilian band Soulfly accused Kan of drunkenly harassing singer Max Cavalera's stepdaughter Roxanne while on a flight from Moscow to Vladivostok on April 29, 2005. Kan reportedly approached Roxanne and her mother while they were boarding the plane; a dispute arose, and Soulfly personnel contacted the police. However, when the police arrived, they were unable to intervene in the dispute due to Kan's status as an elected official, which granted him immunity from arrest. Kan asserted to journalists that he just wanted to have a friendly conversation, while Soulfly later cited this incident as the reason behind their decision to cancel their concert in Vladivostok that same evening.
