= Jay Gan =

American scientist

- Born: 1963 (age 62–63)

Academic background
- Education: Zhejiang University (PhD)

Academic work
- Discipline: agricultural and environmental science
- Institutions: University of California, Riverside

Chinese name
- Simplified Chinese: 甘剑英
- Traditional Chinese: 甘劍英
- Hanyu Pinyin: Gān Jiànyīng

Jay Jianying Gan (born 1963) is an American agricultural and environmental scientist. Gan is current chair of the Department of Environmental Sciences at University of California, Riverside.

== Biography ==
Gan received his B.Sc. in agronomy in 1982, MSc in pesticides in 1985, and PhD in pesticides in 1988, all from Zhejiang University in Hangzhou.

From 1990 to 1991, Gan was a research fellow of the International Atomic Energy Agency (IAEA) of United Nations at IAEA Laboratories. Gan was a research fellow of FAO/IAEA of the United Nations at USDA-ARS Veterinary and Entomology Toxicology Research Laboratory in Texas.

Gan joined the faculty of environmental sciences at University of California, Riverside and serves as professor of soil science, professor of environmental chemistry, and water quality specialist.

In 2006, Gan became a Fellow of the American Society of Agronomy.

Gan previously served as the department chair of Environmental Sciences.

Throughout his career Gan has contributed to authoring over 250 published articles, being cited over 12,500 times for his work in the environmental science field.
