= Human Rights and Global Diversity =

2006 book by Robert Paul Churchill

- Cover
- Author: Robert Paul Churchill
- Original title: Human Rights and Global Diversity: Basic Ethics in Action
- Language: English
- Series: Basic Ethics in Action
- Subject: Universal human rights, diversity, ethics
- Genre: Non-fiction
- Publisher: Routledge
- Publication date: 2006 (Note: The ebook version was published in 2016)
- Publication place: United States
- Pages: 152
- ISBN: 0-130-40885-9

Human rights and global diversity: Basic ethics in action is a book by Robert Paul Churchill. It was published by Routledge in 2006. (Note: Not be confused with a different book of the same title by Simon Caney and Peter Jones, published in 2001 by Psychology Press.)

== Overview ==
The book serves as a resource for educators in different disciplines and culturally diverse schools. It provides a solid foundation and defense of universal human rights, addressing challenges and counter-arguments across three chapters. The structure covers reasoning about human rights as a practice, debates over the universality of human rights, and cross-cultural negotiations over human rights norms. Churchill comprehensively analyzes arguments against universal human rights, explaining why they fail. The book presents and discusses the arguments of various theorists, including Dworkin, Donnelly, and Gewirth, as well as Muslim scholars like Al-Na’im and Othman. Churchill sheds light on crucial issues surrounding human rights and emphasizes their inherent nature for all individuals. The accessible text defends human rights as truly universal, reconciling them with cultural diversity and showcasing the absence of contradiction between human rights norms and cultural values.

The book is divided into three chapters and two appendices:

1. Reasoning about Human Rights
2. Debating the Universality of Human Rights
3. Human Rights and Cross Cultural Negotiations
- Appendices:
  - A. Human Rights Treaties and Covenants
  - B. Human Rights NGOs

== Reception ==
Kristina Andrews praised the book as an invaluable resource for educators in culturally diverse schools. She commended Churchill for providing a solid foundation and defense of universal human rights, addressing challenges and counter-arguments. Andrews highlighted the book's structure with three chapters, covering reasoning about human rights, debating universality, and cross-cultural negotiations. She appreciated Churchill's comprehensive analysis of various arguments against universal human rights, ultimately asserting their universality. Andrews noted the book's strength in revealing the complexities and challenges of human rights and diversity, emphasizing the inherent nature of human rights for all individuals. Despite potential biases, she saw the book as shedding light on crucial issues surrounding human rights.

Edward Eugene Kleist found the book to be a well-organized and suitable resource for undergraduate courses. Kleist appreciated Churchill's analysis of philosophical concepts and the integration of various theorists' arguments. Kleist commended the discussion on negotiating human rights strategies but criticized the weakest one (The fourth strategy, “worldview integration,” proposed by Michael Boylan) as a personal moral project. He considered the book appropriately short and organized, focusing on sympathetic readers of human rights rhetoric but suggested a need for a more extensive work to address larger ethical and political-theoretical issues.
