= Netherlands Missionary Society =

The Netherlands Missionary Society (Dutch: Nederlandsch Zendelinggenootschap - NZG) was a Dutch Protestant missionary society founded in 1797 in Rotterdam that was involved in sending workers to countries such as Indonesia during the Dutch occupation and China during the Qing dynasty.

== Indonesia ==
It sent out Joseph Kam in 1814 to Ambon and he served in the Maluku Islands until his death in 1833. Other notable missions were to Maluku, Sumatra and to Java.

== China ==
This society was the first to follow the example set by the London Missionary Society in seeking to enter China. It sent out Rev. Karl Gützlaff in 1826, with some duties as chaplain under the Dutch government. He reached Java in 1827, but in 1829 he left the service, and gave himself largely to preaching, writing and distributing Christian books, visiting the ships in the seaports of Siam, Singapore, Macau, and other places. On the death of Hon. John Robert Morrison, he succeeded him as Chinese Secretary in the government of Hong Kong, which post he held till his death. He became a very expert Chinese scholar, and prepared a translation of the Bible. He also issued many historical and religious books. He was followed by Rev. Herman Rottger in 1832, who labored in Macau and Hong Kong until 1846, when he retired, and the Netherlands Mission ceased to exist. Dr. Gützlaff died in 1851.

== Reports ==
The society published regular yearly reports in the 19th century that were used to inform donors of the proceedings. In 1897 a memorial book was published by the chairman Jacobus Craandijk.

== See also ==
- Protestant missionary societies in China during the 19th century
