= Empress Jin =

Empress Jin (靳皇后/金皇后) may refer to one of the following Chinese empresses:

- Jin Yueguang (靳月光) and Jin Yuehua (靳月華), two of Han-Zhao emperor Liu Cong's later empresses.
- Empress Jin (Yin), empress of Han-Zhao emperor Liu Can.
- Empress Jin Feishan, empress of Former Shu emperor Wang Yan.
- Lady Jin, wife of Min emperor Wang Yanjun, sometimes referred to as Empress Jin.
