= Kan Xuan =

Chinese contemporary visual artist (born 1972)

- 阚萱
- Born: 1972; Xuancheng, Anhui
- Occupation: Contemporary Artist
- Years active: 1990s-present
- Known for: Video artworks

Kan Xuan (Chinese: 阚萱; pinyin: Kàn Xuān) (born in 1972 in Xuancheng, Anhui) is a Chinese contemporary visual artist, known for her experimental video artworks, though some of her work incorporates painting, photography, and performance art. She is considered as one of the most important female video artists of China, and has been active since the late 1990s.

== Early life ==
Kan was born in Xuancheng, Anhui Province. She studied from 1993 to 1997 at the China Academy of Art, in Hangzhou, where she was part of the evolution of video art from its inception in China. Two of her teachers were Geng Jianyi and Zhang Peili. During this time she became friends with video artists already renowned at the time, such as Zhang Peili. She moved to Shanghai after graduating from the China Academy of Art and then moved to Beijing in 1998. To maintain a living, Kan Xuan also did many other jobs such as sculpture assistant, and also worked at a movie production company. It was there she learned how to use the computer, video making, and 3D editing.

== Career ==
In 1998, she went to Beijing and worked for a sculpture factory and various film production companies. She participated in her first major group exhibition by showing her still frame video work "Kan Xuan! - Eh!" at the "Art for Sale" exhibition in 1999, which was one of the most innovative experimental art exhibitions to take place in China at the time.

Kan completed a residency at the Rijksakademie van Beeldende Kunsten in Amsterdam from 2002 to 2003. She received the Netherlands’ Prix de Rome in 2005. During her time in the Netherlands, she created works that focus on the concepts of liberation, globalization and its impact on economy. Much of her work examined the differences between China and the West, rich and poor, and effects of commercialization, which she explored in her 1999 work "Garbage" and 2006-2009 work "Island".

In 2009, she returned to Beijing, where she worked on large scale installations about Chinese history. She travelled extensively throughout China while making many short documentary films about important traditions that are often ignored in the present time.

A notable aspect of her work at exhibition "Yellow Signal: New Media in China" (2012) at The Vancouver International Centre for Contemporary Asian Art was an exploration of Zen spirituality.

== Artistic style ==
Kan Xuan is often directly associated with the cool end of China's new media and video art. Yet opportunities to see her work, especially in mainland China have been rare. Her first show in Beijing (2003), when her work Looking, Looking, Looking (2002) was included as a part of a touring exhibition named "Under Construction". In the next few years, some of her works were shown in and around 798.

Kan is often featured in her videos. She uses her personal experience as a way to convey the concepts of the works. Her early low-tech handheld camera-work brought an intimacy and beauty to seemingly trivial elements from everyday life. She quietly and humorously expresses immediate sensual experiences in unique visual angles, to an effect of sense altering and thought-provoking narratives. The artist's modest character is reflected through her work as a subtle, succinct nature; becoming a combination of understated visual components and a consciously slight choice of motifs brought to exploring profound ideas.

Kan often plays with ambiguity and dissonance. Although her works are often short and simple, they allude to a deeper sense of spiritualism.

In her own words, "it is about trying to become closer to and trying to follow, in every moment, my wish to exist in that distance between ‘thinking’ and ‘feeling’."

== Personal life ==
Currently, Kan divides her time between Beijing and Amsterdam.

== Exhibitions ==
Solo exhibitions

- 2008: "Kan Xuan! Ai!." Galleria Continua (San Gimignano, Italy)
- 2009: "Light, Works by Kan Xuan." Arrow Factory (Beijing)
- 2012: "Kan Xuan: Millet Mounds." Ullens Center for Contemporary Art (Beijing)
- 2016: "Kan Xuan" Ikon Gallery (Birmingham)
- 2019: "Kan Xuan: Racing Gravels" Times Art Center Berlin (Berlin, Germany)

Selected group exhibitions

- 1999: "Art for Sale" Modern Art Center (Shanghai)
- 2000: "Home?, Contemporary Art Exhibition." Yuexing Furniture Plaza (Shanghai)
- 2002: "The First Guangzhou Trienniale - Reinterpretation: A Decade of Experimental Chinese Art (1990-2000)." Guangdong Museum of Art (Guangzhou)
- 2002: "Under Construction: New Dimensions of Asian Art." The Japan Foundation Asia Center; Tokyo Opera City Cultural Foundation
- 2003: "Alors la Chine?" Centre Pompidou, Paris
- 2004: "Dial 62761232 (Express Delivery Exhibition), Contemporary Art Exhibition." BizArt, Shanghai
- 2005: "The Second Guangzhou Triennial, BEYOND: an extraordinary space of experimentation for modernization." Guangdong Museum of Art, Guangzhou
- 2006: "9th Havana Biennial." National Art Center, Havana, Cuba
- 2006: "Nunca salgo sin mi cámara / Never Go Out Without My DVcam, Video en china." Museo Colecciones ICO, Madrid, Spain
- 2006: "China Power Station: Part I." Battersea Power Station (London)
- 2007: "China Power Station: Part II." Astrup Fearnley Museum of Modern Art, Oslo, Norway
- 2007: "China Power Station: Part III." National Art Museum, Luxembourg
- 2007: "Not only Possible, But also Necessary-Optimism in the Age of Global War." 10th International Istanbul Biennial
- 2007: "Everyday Miracles: Four Women Artists" at The Chinese Pavilion. 52nd Venice Biennale
- 2008: "Our Future, The Guy & Myriam Ullens Foundation Collection." Ullens Center for Contemporary Art, Beijing
- 2009: "Bourgeoisified Proletariat, Contemporary Art Exhibition in Songjiang." Shanghai Songjiang Creative Studio
- 2010: "Jungle: A Close-Up Focus on Chinese Contemporary Art Trends." Platform China, Beijing
- 2010: “Kan Xuan: Qingxie de Jiashi” (Kan Xuan: Oblique Housework)." National Art Museum of China, Beijing
- 2012: "The Unseen - 4th Guangzhou Triennial." The Guangdong Museum of Art
- 2013: "The Garden of Diversion, Sifang Art Museum Inaugural Exhibition." Sifang Art Museum, Nanjing
- 2014: "The 8 of Paths, Art Exhibition in the Uferhallen." Uferhallen, Berlin
- 2015: "Mobile M+: Moving Images." M+ (Hong Kong)
- 2015: "China 8: Contemporary Art from China at the Rhine and Ruhr." Lehmbruck Museum, Duisburg
- 2016: "Tales of Our Time." Solomon R. Guggenheim Museum (New York, U.S.A.)
- 2017: "Art and China after 1989: Theater of the World." Solomon R. Guggenheim Museum (New York, U.S.A.)
- 2018: "Walk Strangely, Stay Strangely: Sora Kim vs Kan Xuan: A Double One Woman Show." Guangdong Times Museum (Guangzhou, China)
- 2025: "Sigg Collection: Inner Worlds." M+ (Hong Kong)

Private collections

- Dr. Michael I. Jacobs Collection, U.S.A.
- M+ Collection, Hong Kong

== Honors ==
- 2005: Prix de Rome, Netherlands

== Selected works and publications ==
- Serpentine Gallery; Battersea Power Station; Astrup Fearnley museet for moderne kunst (2006). China Power Station. Part I. Birmingham: Fused Magazine. OCLC 711754683. Special issue of Fused Magazine published to accompany the Serpentine Gallery exhibition at Battersea Power Station, 8 Oct. - 5 Nov. 2006
- Kvaran, Gunnar B.; Obrist, Hans-Ulrich; Peyton-Jones, Julia; Serpentine Gallery; Astrup Fearnley Museet for Moderne Kunst (2007). China Power Station. Part II (in English and Norwegian). Oslo: Astrup Fearnley Museum of Modern Art. ISBN 978-8-291-43052-2. OCLC 228508946. Catalog of an exhibition held at Astrup Fearnley Museum of Modern Art, Oslo, Sept. 8-Dec. 2, 2007
- Beltrame, Federica; Galleria Continua (2008). 无动于衷: 伊利亚・卡巴利夫, 阚萱, 萨布琳娜・梅扎奎, 汗斯・欧普・德・贝客, 孙原, 彭禹 [Unmoved: Ilya Kabakov, Kan Xuan, Sabrina Mezzaqui, Hans Op de Beeck, Sun Yuan, Peng Yu] (in English and Chinese). Beijing: Galleria Continua. OCLC 501427978. Catalogue of an exhibition held at Galleria Continua (Beijing), 12 July 2008
- Kan, Xuan (2013). 阚萱: 大谷子堆 [Kan Xuan: Millet Mounds] (in Chinese and English). Beijing: Shi jie tu shu chu ban gong si Beijing gong si. ISBN 978-7-510-05620-8. OCLC 861241119. Published on the occasion of the exhibition Kan Xuan: Millet Mounds at the Ullens Center for Contemporary Art, 15 September 2012 – 15 November 2012
- Lu, Leiping; Watkins, Jonathan (2016). Kan Xuan (Exhibition catalog). Birmingham: Ikon Gallery Ltd. ISBN 978-1-911-15502-7. OCLC 953598879. Published on the occasion of the exhibition held at Ikon Gallery, Birmingham, July 6-September 11, 2016
- Weng, Xiaoyu; Hanru, Hou (2016). Tales of Our Time (Exhibition catalogue) (in Chinese and English). Solomon R. Guggenheim Museum. ISBN 978-0892075294. Published on the occasion of the exhibition Tales of Our Time at the Solomon R. Guggenheim Museum, November 4, 2016 - March 10, 2017
