= Joseph Kam =

Dutch missionary

Joseph Kam (September 1769 – July 18, 1833) was a Dutch missionary in Indonesia.

His father, Joost Kam, was a leather merchant in 's-Hertogenbosch, Netherlands. The family were members of the Reformed Church, influenced by the spirit of Herrnhut pietism, and had links with Herrnhut groups in Zeist. Kam helped his father in the leather trade, but was eager to preach the gospel to the nations which did not yet not know Christianity. In 1802, when Kam's father and mother died, he left the leather business and worked at the National Court. He married in 1804, but his wife died two months after giving birth.

Kam then joined Netherlands Missionary Society (NZG) and moved to Rotterdam to receive the preparation of Zendeling candidate there. In Rotterdam he received the education of Zendeling candidate, together with Gottlob Bruckner and Johann Ch. Supper from Germany. In 1811, his preparatory education for was finished, but he was not yet able to be dispatched to the mission field because of the war between England and France.

NZG then tried to post Kam to the mission field by smuggling him into Britain. In October 1812, Kam and his colleagues arrived in London and saw the London Missionary Society administrators. They were then sent to Gosport to receive further educational preparation, while serving churches there. In 1813, he was ordained a priest in London.

In 1814, he arrived in Batavia with his two colleagues, Bruckner and Supper. At that time, Kam and his colleagues became Indische Kerk employees. Since the Indische Kerk prioritizes maintenance of the congregations that already exist. Therefore, Supper remained in Batavia to serve the congregation there, Bruckner was stationed in Semarang, and Kam himself stationed on Ambon.

Mid-1814, Kam traveled to Ambon but ended up stopping in Surabaya because no ships were sailing to Ambon. While in Surabaya, he worked in Indische Kerk's congregation there. In March 1815, he arrived in Ambon, and immediately started working with congregations in the Maluku Islands which had long been abandoned by the Dutch. In the Maluku Islands, Kam perform all the duties of a pastor, such as preaching, visiting the congregations, arbitrate disputes and quarrels, and served sacraments. He is also active in developing Christian readings, like the Bible, Psalms, Catechism, and sermons for congregations without ministers or teachers. Shortly after Kam arrived in Ambon, he married a woman of Indo-Dutch extraction, Sara Maria Timmerman, who remained at his side until the end of his life.

Kam is considered by the Protest Church in the Moluccas to be one of the significant shapers of their history.

In his trip to Southeast Maluku, he became seriously ill, and was forced to return to Ambon. After 20 years service in the Maluku Islands, he died on July 18, 1833, and was buried in Ambon.

== Sources ==
- I. H. Enklaar. 1980. Joseph Kam: Rasul Maluku. Jakarta: BPK Gunung Mulia.
- F.D. Wellem. cet. ke-2 2000. Riwayat Hidup Singkat Tokoh-tokoh dalam Sejarah Gereja. Jakarta: BPK Gunung Mulia. hlm. 155-7.
- Th. van den End. cet. ke-4 1988. Ragi Carita 1: Sejarah Gereja di Indonesia 1500-1860. Jakarta: BPK Gunung Mulia. hlm. 162-4.
- Jan S. Aritonang & Karel Steenbrink (eds.). 2008. A History of Christianity in Indonesia. Leiden: Koninklijke Brill NV. hlm. 386-9.

== Books ==
- Enklaar, I.H.: Joseph Kam - Apostel der Molukken. Boekencentrum 1963
