= Shut Up! Cartoons =

YouTube channel

- Intertitle used in videos
- Type: Subsidiary channel
- Network: YouTube

Programming
- Language: English
- Picture format: 1080p

Ownership
- Owner: Defy Media
- Parent: Smosh

History
- Launched: April 30, 2012; 14 years ago
- Closed: June 23, 2017; 9 years ago

Availability

Streaming media
- YouTube: ShutUpCartoons

Shut Up! Cartoons was a YouTube animation channel project created by Anthony Padilla and Ian Hecox of Smosh and by Barry Blumberg, featuring various animated videos. Shut Up! Cartoons launched on April 30, 2012, with Do's and Don'ts, and ended with the termination of the series Smosh Babies on June 23, 2017.

== Ownership and production ==
The channel was launched as part of YouTube's $100 million "original channel initiative" by Smosh co-creators Anthony Padilla and Ian Hecox, as well as Barry Blumberg. Blumberg served as the president of the Smosh YouTube channel, as well as Shut Up! Cartoons. Previously, Blumberg served as the executive vice president of Harvey Entertainment, as well as Disney Television Animation chief. At the time of Shut Up! Cartoon's launch, Blumberg was the Head of Content for Alloy Digital, which would become Defy Media via its 2013 merger with Break Media. As such, Defy Media owned Shut Up! Cartoons.

At the channel's launch, Lenora Hume served as its production lead. Later, TeamTO co-founder Corinne Kouper served as head of production on Shut Up! Cartoons.

== Content ==
The initial teaser trailer featured clips from 11 different shows, with Padilla and Hecox later informing their viewers that there were 18 planned shows in total. The first three cartoons launched by the network included Do's and Don'ts: A Children's Guide to Social Survival, Zombies vs. Ninjas, and Pubertina, a show about an 11-year-old girl going through puberty. In May 2012, Smosh launched Krogzilla, a show created by and starring Cory Edwards featuring John O'Hurley, about a shrunken sea monster seeking employment. Snowjacked soon followed, broadcasting on Tuesdays to mixed reception.

At the end of the first three cartoons' 10-episode run, they were replaced by Nature Break, Weasel Town, and Oishi High School Battle. Oishi High School Battle was a 10-episode live-action animated series created by Daniel Dominguez and Joe Gressis,^{[a]} which followed a anime teenage demon hunter, Oishi Kawaii, attending an American high school following the termination of her father Ryuzu's job due to incompetence. The series was directed by Brett Weiner and animation directed by M.C. Griffin. Lauder Robinson and Peter Lundquist produced the series, with Dena Hysell-Cornejo and Melody Rutherford serving as executive producers alongside Padilla, Hecox and Blumberg. Marina Viscun and Jake Hartley served as associate producers. The theme song was performed by Blood on the Dance Floor. The series ran from July 13, 2012 to September 14, 2012. Another show was added replacing Krogzilla, called Samurai! Daycare. In September 2012, they also launched Politicats to replace Snowjacked. The show that replaced Nature Break was Planets, a reality show about the ten celestial bodies of the Solar System (the eight planets, Pluto, and the Sun).

Weasel Town's replacement, entitled Really Freaking Embarrassing, was created by Peter Hannan (Nickelodeon's CatDog). The series had its first trailer removed by YouTube for "shocking and disturbing content". A new trailer was added, with fewer disturbing scenes. In September 2012, the channel launched Oishi Origins, a three-episode prequel to Oishi High School Battle. The show replacing Samurai! Daycare was Icons of Teen, which features both fictional characters (such as Batman and Spock) and real celebrities (such as Oprah Winfrey) as teenagers. Also that week, Oishi Origins was replaced by Teleporting Fat Guy, which was based on a character from previous Smosh videos, who explains how he became the Teleporting Fat Guy.

On November 20, 2012, Politicats was replaced by Sub: 3, following a Speed Racer-like character that delivers pizza on a tight time limit, met by mixed reviews. On November 28, 2012, the trailer for With Zombies, created by Matt Clark (the creator of Planets), was released. On February 17, 2013, Oishi High School Battle was nominated for Best Animated Series at the 3rd Streamy Awards, but lost to Electric City. On June 12, 2013, the paper series Paper Cuts premiered on the channel. The ten episodes featured shot-by-shot re-creations of famous movie scenes and trailers made entirely out of construction paper. On June 23, 2013, the Canadian stop motion series Life's a Zoo premiered on the channel. On June 26, 2013, Oishi High School Battle was renewed for a second season, with episodes being directed by Joe Gressis. Adam Deyoe and Loren "Enzo" Semmens joined production as live-action director and producers, the latter through his company Bronco Showdown, and Hilary Miller was hired as a script editor for the episodes. Jeffrey Peters served as director of photography for the season, and Lucas Smith did second unit camera work. On November 15, 2013, Do's and Don'ts and Krogzilla received IAWTV nominations for Best Animated Web Series. In January 2014, Oishi High School Battle was renewed for a third and final season. The second seasons for Do's and Don'ts and Pubertina premiered in April 2014.

On June 23, 2017, the channel posted their final video, which was the series finale of Smosh Babies, and ceased operations following Padilla's departure from Smosh. Defy Media later removed all the episodes of Oishi High School Battle from Smosh's website and the channel, and sold the rights to Verizon's streaming service go90, commissioning a 20-episode sequel series named Oishi: Demon Hunter. The series was directed by Joe Gressis and produced by Alan R. Cohen and Alan Freedland. The series was produced in 2017–2018. Actors Cathy Shim, Kyoko Mase, Shawn Pearlman, Greg Watanabe, Anthony Burch and Kevin Joy and Gressis himself reprised their roles from the original series, while new actors and actresses were cast for the production.^{[b]} Mark Viloria handled plate shooting for green screen use, and Andrew Garwig served as a production assistant. Animation production was handled by SmashBits Animation.^{[c]} The series was edited by Michael Stratigakis, Barrett J. Amato, Don Fisco, and Kenny Kiesecker. Oishi: Demon Hunter was set to air in March 2019. However, production was halted when go90 shut down on July 31, 2018, and Defy Media also shut down on November 6 of that same year.

== Series ==
Show Title	Creator(s)	Debut	Ended
Do's and Don'ts	F. Ryan Naumann	April 30, 2012 (Season 1)	July 2, 2012 (Season 1)
Do's and Don'ts	F. Ryan Naumann	February 4, 2013 (Season 2)	April 8, 2013 (Season 2)
Pubertina	Emily Brundige	May 2, 2012 (Season 1)	July 4, 2012 (Season 1)
Pubertina	Emily Brundige	February 20, 2013 (Season 2)	May 22, 2013 (Season 2)
Zombies vs. Ninjas	Michael Granberry	May 4, 2012 (Season 1)	July 6, 2012 (Season 1)
Zombies vs. Ninjas	Michael Granberry	March 22, 2013 (Season 2)	June 28, 2013 (Season 2)
Krogzilla	Cory Edwards	May 31, 2012	August 2, 2012
Snowjacked	Kelsy Abbott and John Olsen	June 26, 2012	August 28, 2012
Nature Break	Mike Hollingsworth	July 9, 2012	September 10, 2012
Weasel Town	Eric Filipkowski and Nathan Hamill	July 11, 2012	September 12, 2012
Oishi High School Battle	Daniel Dominguez and Joe Gressis	July 13, 2012 (Season 1)	September 14, 2012 (Season 1)
Oishi High School Battle	Daniel Dominguez and Joe Gressis	December 6, 2013 (Season 2)	February 7, 2014 (Season 2)
Oishi High School Battle	Daniel Dominguez and Joe Gressis	June 20, 2014 (Season 3)	August 22, 2014 (Season 3)
Samurai! Daycare	Mike Blum	August 9, 2012	October 11, 2012
Politicats	SunnyBoy	September 4, 2012	November 6, 2012
Planets	Matt Clark	September 17, 2012 (Season 1)	November 19, 2012 (Season 1)
Planets	Matt Clark	May 27, 2013 (Season 2)	July 29, 2013 (Season 2)
Planets	Matt Clark	October 28, 2013 (Season 3)	December 30, 2013 (Season 3)
Really Freaking Embarrassing	Peter Hannan	September 19, 2012	November 21, 2012
Oishi Origins	Daniel Dominguez and Joe Gressis	September 28, 2012	October 12, 2012
Icons of Teen	Brian Wysol	October 18, 2012	December 20, 2012
Teleporting Fat Guy	Anthony Padilla and Ian Hecox	October 19, 2012 (Season 1)	December 21, 2012 (Season 1)
Teleporting Fat Guy	Anthony Padilla and Ian Hecox	April 4, 2014 (Season 2)	June 6, 2014 (Season 2)
Teleporting Fat Guy	Anthony Padilla and Ian Hecox	October 31, 2014 (Season 3)	January 2, 2015 (Season 3)
Sub: 3	Prudence Fenton and Peter Hastings	November 20, 2012	January 22, 2013
With Zombies	Matt Clark	December 5, 2012	February 6, 2013
Paper Cuts	Travis Betz	June 12, 2013	October 16, 2013
Life's a Zoo^{[d]}	Andrew Horne	June 23, 2013	November 3, 2013
Just Shut Up	Anthony Padilla and Ian Hecox	July 13, 2013	November 23, 2013
Smosh Babies	Anthony Padilla and Ian Hecox	August 12, 2013 (season 1)	October 14, 2013 (season 1)
Smosh Babies	Anthony Padilla and Ian Hecox	January 13, 2014 (season 2)	March 21, 2014 (season 2)
Smosh Babies	Anthony Padilla and Ian Hecox	January 23, 2015 (season 3)	June 26, 2015 (season 3)
Smosh Babies	Anthony Padilla and Ian Hecox	January 22, 2016 (season 4)	June 24, 2016 (season 4)
Smosh Babies	Anthony Padilla and Ian Hecox	January 20, 2017 (season 5)	June 23, 2017 (season 5)
Munroe	Brian Wysol	November 13, 2013	January 15, 2014
Otaku Taco Truck	SunnyBoy	February 17, 2014	April 21, 2014
16-Bit High	Brett Weiner	March 8, 2014	August 3, 2014
Alfred and Poe	Chris Bennett	May 5, 2014	July 7, 2014
Money & Cash	Joel H. Cohen	August 4, 2014	October 6, 2014
Überdude	Jeremy Diamond	February 13, 2015	June 5, 2015
Maganzo	Brian Wysol	June 19, 2015	July 17, 2015
Super Smosh	Chris Bennett	July 24, 2015 (season 1)	November 25, 2015 (season 1)
Super Smosh	Chris Bennett	July 22, 2016 (season 2)	December 23, 2016 (season 2)
Staff of Gelroth	Brian Wysol	July 31, 2015	August 14, 2015
Crazy Cabbies		September 2, 2015	October 21, 2015
Scream Engine IV^{[e]}	Harriss and Matt	October 5, 2015	December 14, 2015
God Squad	Nicholas Kempt	November 4, 2015	December 16, 2015
An Okay Place to Eat	Andrew Racho	December 21, 2015	January 4, 2016
ABC Wid Da Mob		December 30, 2015	February 17, 2016
Blood Red		February 24, 2016	April 13, 2016

== Legacy ==
Several creators who worked with Shut Up! Cartoons have gone on to create their own series or worked on other successful shows, including Mike Hollingsworth (creator of Nature Break, who went on to become the supervising director for BoJack Horseman and served as an executive producer for Inside Job), Brian Wysol (creator of Icons of Teen, Munroe, Maganzo and Staff of Gelroth, who went on to create Hot Streets), Emily Brundige (creator of Pubertina, Goldie and Strawberry Vampire, who went on to develop Harvey Street Kids and served as a writer for various animated shows like Unikitty! and Amphibia) and Daniel Dominguez (co-creator of Oishi High School Battle, who went on to work as a writer for various shows like The Epic Tales of Captain Underpants).

== Notes ==
a.Attributed to multiple references:
b.Actors cast for the series included Sasha Gary, Evan Strand, Motown Maurice, Sascha Knopf, Angela de Silva, Sky Liam Patterson, Tanner Risner, Galen Howard, Jaime Moyer, Kathryn Feeney, Amanda Klein, Chris Blevins, Justin Giddings, Ryan David Manuel, Reba Buhr, Malcolm Kelner, and Frank Gerrish.
c.Animators and artists working on the series included Audrey Hopkins, Alvie Jackson, Katrina J. Tumasz, Lynn Walsh, Ramiro Olmos, Juliah Rueckert, Trilina Mai, Joseph Hurley, Victor Zavala, Evie Hollings, Ilyssa Ona, Nicole Rene Miller, Kensei Morita, Tiffany Brower, Carlos Rivera, Ryan Brown, and Brett Ackley.
d.Originally created by Cuppa Coffee Studios in 2008 for Teletoon in Canada. Shut Up! Cartoons obtained the rights to the series, but it has been deleted from the YouTube channel.
e.Originally created by Harriss and Matt in 2008 and published to Super Deluxe. Shut Up! Cartoons gained the rights to the series following the revival of Super Deluxe in 2015.
