= Krogzilla =

- Also known as: Krogzilla Gets a Job
- Genre: Comedy
- Created by: Cory Edwards
- Written by: Cory Edwards
- Directed by: Cory Edwards
- Voices of: Cory Edwards; Josh Greene; Karen Whipple; Shon Little; David Storrs; Ken Marino; Mary Alice Brady; John O'Hurley
- Composer: Josh Greene
- No. of seasons: 1
- No. of episodes: 10

Production
- Executive producers: Anthony Padilla; Ian Hecox; Barry Blumberg
- Producer: Ryan Hostetler
- Running time: 3 minutes
- Production companies: Silly Monster Media LLC; Green Shoe Animation LLC (animation service)

Original release
- Network: Shut Up! Cartoons
- Release: May 31 – August 2, 2012

Krogzilla is an American adult animated web series, created by filmmaker and actor Cory Edwards for the YouTube channel Shut Up! Cartoons. The series premiered on May 31, 2012 and stars Edwards as a sea monster named Krogzilla, who was shrunk by scientists. The first season, titled Krogzilla Gets a Job, ended on August 2, 2012 and consisted of ten three-minute episodes that focused on Krogzilla's pursuit of new employment. Edwards has implied the possibility of future seasons and explained that the title of the series would change with each season to reflect a new goal that Krogzilla must accomplish.

== Characters ==
- Krogzilla (Cory Edwards), a sea monster who used to be 200 feet tall and terrorize cities before he was shrunk by scientists. He is now trying to fit in with humans, and searching for stable employment.
- Jeff (Josh Greene), a hot-tempered barnacle that lives on Krogzilla's neck.
- Marcus (Josh Greene), a human who befriends Krogzilla and often works with him.
- Regurgitor (Ken Marino), Krogzilla's nemesis. He is a yellow four-armed monster with red spikes, and can vomit lava. After he was shrunk, he became a famous movie star.

== Episodes ==
=== The Interview ===
Director: Cory Edwards

Writer: Cory Edwards

Cast: Cory Edwards as Krogzilla, Josh Greene as Jeff and Gardener, Karen Whipple as Receptionist, Shon Little as HR Director

Original airdate: May 31, 2012

Plot: Krogzilla goes to a job interview.

=== Big Dogs ===
Director: Cory Edwards

Writer: Cory Edwards

Cast: Cory Edwards as Krogzilla, David Storrs as Vince, Josh Greene as Jeff and Marcus

Original airdate: June 7, 2012

Plot: Krogzilla works at Big Dogs, a fast food restaurant that specializes in hotdogs, and befriends his co-worker Marcus.

Cory Edwards sought to parody fast food in this episode, and described Big Dogs as "the dumbest, most hideous idea" he could think of. He felt that real fast food restaurants make poor attempts at variety, and parodied this with the disgusting toppings offered at Big Dogs. After completing the episode, he regretted that he did not include a long menu featuring all of the topping ideas that he had come up with.

=== Attack of the Kiosk ===
Director: Cory Edwards

Writer: Cory Edwards

Cast: Cory Edwards as Krogzilla, Mary Alice Brady as Little Girl and Rita, Josh Greene as Jeff and Afro Kid, David Storrs as Mall Guard, Ken Marino as Regurgitor

Original airdate: June 14, 2012

Plot: After Krogzilla finishes work at a kiosk that sells frozen yogurt, he runs into his old nemesis Regurgitor.

Cory Edwards had previously collaborated with Ken Marino on Hoodwinked!, and immediately thought of him to play the role of Regurgitor. David Storrs, who played the mall guard in this episode, had played the role of Vince in the previous episode. Both actors improvised some of their lines. Regurgitor was going to wear an Ed Hardy T-shirt, but the idea did not make it into the final episode. Though the character's legs are never seen, Edwards has stated that Regurgitor does not wear pants.

=== Tiny Buildings ===
Director: Cory Edwards

Writer: Cory Edwards

Cast: Cory Edwards as Krogzilla, John O'Hurley as Executive, Karen Whipple as Shayla, Josh Greene as Jeff and Marcus

Original airdate: June 21, 2012

Plot: Krogzilla works at an architectural firm and gets in trouble for stealing model buildings.

Edwards knew that he wanted to put Krogzilla in a situation with miniature building models as a reference to old Godzilla movies, and also wanted to place an episode in a corporate setting, saying, "In comedy, the more formal the situation, the better the "squirm" factor and the more laughs you get out of inappropriate behavior." Edwards met John O'Hurley when their children attended the same preschool class, and cast him as the executive in this episode. Edwards wrote the character of Shayla for Karen Whipple, who had previously played the receptionist in the first episode.

=== Regurgitated ===
Director: Cory Edwards

Writer: Cory Edwards

Cast: Cory Edwards as Krogzilla and Gomer, Josh Greene as Marcus and Jeff, Jason Gerali as Randy, Vanessa Ragland as Lola, Katie Hooten as Mom, Eva Hooten as Girl

Original Airdate: June 28, 2012

Plot: Krogzilla works at a movie theatre with Marcus, and notices that a new movie starring Regurgitor is coming out. Three filmgoers recognize Marcus and start to pick on him, when Krogzilla comes to his friend's defense.

Edwards used this episode to comment on many of the issues that he has with the current film industry, including the impersonalization of movie theatres and the influx of sequels and remakes. He also commented on bullying in the episode. Shayla and the executive from the previous episode can be seen going on a date at the beginning of the episode. This idea was not in the script, but was conceived of by the animators. Edwards wanted to create many fake movie posters to be seen in the episode, but was unable due to budget constraints. Edwards cast his sister Katie Hooten and niece Eva Hooten as the mother and daughter in this episode.

=== Party Marty ===
Director: Cory Edwards

Writer: Cory Edwards

Cast: Cory Edwards as Krogzilla, Josh Greene as Marcus and Jeff, Vicki Edwards as Mom, Elliot Edwards as Boy, Eva Hooten as Girl, Nathaniel Edwards as Toddler

Original Airdate: July 5, 2012

Plot: Krogzilla entertains at a child's birthday party, dressed as a purple monster character named Party Marty.

Edwards and many of his friends have personally held jobs entertaining at children's birthday parties, though Edwards has never had to dress in a costume. He enjoyed coming up with a children's character to exist in the world of the show and since he felt that clowns, Barney the Dinosaur, Dora the Explorer, and Sesame Street characters had been over-done, he decided to draw inspiration from the children's television series Yo Gabba Gabba! instead. Edwards has stated that his children are fans of the series and that he himself enjoys the show's design. Edwards' niece Eva Hooten, who had played the girl in the previous episode, was cast as another girl in this episode, while his wife Vicki Edwards and his sons Elliot Edwards and Nathaniel Edwards also played roles in the episode. Nathaniel was two years old when he recorded his lines, and wouldn't record them until Josh Greene's dog was brought into the booth. Edwards wanted to feature a scene with Krogzilla jumping in and popping a bounce house, as well as moments with a piñata, and a table of presents, but these were not animated due to budget and schedule restraints. A joke where Krogzilla makes a balloon that could be interpreted as either a sword or a penis was not in the original script, but was conceived of by the animators.

=== Pet Store ===
Director: Cory Edwards

Writer: Cory Edwards

Cast: Cory Edwards as Krogzilla, Josh Greene as Marcus and Jeff, Katie Hooten as Shirley, Ken Marino as Delivery Guy

Original Airdate: July 12, 2012

Plot: Krogzilla and Marcus apply for a job at a pet store, where Krogzilla is upset by what he perceives to be the enslavement of other reptiles. He sees the other animals as food though, and eats all of the birds in the store, ruining the interview.

Edwards wrote the role of Shirley for his sister Katie Hooten, who had previously played the mom in the fifth episode, while Ken Marino, who plays Regurgitor, was cast as the Delivery Guy in this episode. Much of his dialogue was improvised. His character was originally written as a goth, but due to budget constraints the same character model as Vince from the second episode and the mall guard from the third episode was used instead. Shirley was created using the same character model as Lola from the fifth episode. Krogzilla's appetite for cats was an homage to ALF from the television series ALF.

=== The Sub ===
Director: Cory Edwards

Writer: Cory Edwards

Cast: Cory Edwards as Krogzilla, Josh Greene as Jeff and Student, Jason Gerali as Alan and Student, Vanessa Ragland as Alice (VP) and Student, Karen Whipple as Student

Original airdate: July 19, 2012

Plot: Krogzilla is a substitute teacher and gets into an awkward conversation with a Japanese teacher in the teachers' lounge.

Edwards chose to have Krogzilla get a job as a substitute teacher since it was a job that many of his friends had held, and the requirements for holding it are minimal. Edwards wanted to show a classroom full of children, but could only show the top of their heads due to budget constraints. Edwards felt that this weakened the scene since the children's reactions could not be shown. Edwards asked his animators to add sight gags to the classroom scene, since it was dialogue-laden and SMOSH did not want the show to be "too talky". The gags that the animators came up with included the students flying paper airplanes and shooting spitwads, and Krogzilla accidentally pulling down a chart of the male reproductive system. The line about Alan being from Tulsa was an homage to Edwards' own home town and the line about not being allowed to smoke is a reference to SMOSH not allowing Edwards to include smoking or even references to smoking in the show. Jason Gerali, who plays Alan, and Vanessa Ragland, who plays Alice, previously played Randy and Lola respectively in the fifth episode. Alice was originally going to appear on screen, but was instead only heard over an intercom box due to budget constraints. Karen Whipple, who plays one of the students, had previously played the receptionist in the first episode and Shayla in the fourth episode.

=== Price Bombers ===
Director: Cory Edwards

Writer: Cory Edwards

Cast: Cory Edwards as Krogzilla, Josh Greene as Darren, Karen Whipple as Zombie Girl, Vicki Edwards as Zombie Girl, Ken Marino as Regurgitor

Original Airdate: July 26, 2012

Plot: Krogzilla works at a store called Price Bombers and runs into Regurgitor signing autographs.

Price Bombers was based on Target, and Darren was based on Dean Pelton from the television series Community. Darren uses the same character model as the executive from the fourth episode. The Zombie Girls were based on real people that Karen Whipple encountered at a Party City. One of the Zombie Girls was played by Whipple, who had previously played the receptionist in the first episode, Shayla in the fourth episode, and a student in the eighth episode, while the other one was played by Edwards' wife Vicki Edwards, who had previously played the mom in the sixth episode. The taco salad joke was a reference to an improv routine done by David Storrs, who played Vince in the second episode and the mall guard in the third episode.

=== Deconstruction ===
Director: Cory Edwards

Writer: Cory Edwards

Cast: Cory Edwards as Krogzilla, Joel McCrary as Foreman, Josh Greene as Marcus and Jeff

Original Airdate: August 2, 2012

Plot: Krogzilla gets a job tearing down buildings and finds it to be a perfect fit. Marcus, who has found a job as a delivery man, visits Krogzilla at work and reveals that he plans on going back to school.

Edwards chose to make the final episode more emotional than comedic and hoped to speak to those who had lost jobs in recent years. He compared the episode's tone to a Wes Anderson movie and recognized that it might not appeal to SMOSH's target demographic, so he was surprised when it was well received by viewers. The Foreman is played by Joel McCrary, who was originally cast in Edwards' 2005 computer-animated film Hoodwinked! before being replaced by Xzibit. The character previously appeared as a gardener in the first episode, though he was played by Josh Greene then. Edwards did not originally plan on making them the same character, but while trying to lower the number of characters in the show due to budget constraints, he decided to combine them. He was pleased with the result of Krogzilla ultimately being hired by the first person that he encountered in the series. The episode features an original song titled "Creatures (Getting Closer)", written by Nick Flora.

== Development ==
In October 2011, YouTube announced that it was entering into a $100 million deal to create over one hundred new channels on its site. These channels would feature original content created by various Hollywood production companies, celebrities, and new media groups with the hope of providing a new Digital Age alternative to television. In December of that year, shortly after the expiration of his contract to write and direct a feature film of the television series Fraggle Rock, filmmaker and actor Cory Edwards announced that he was creating an animated web series that would air on one of these channels. Edwards had previously served as a pioneer in entertainment, by directing the 2005 film Hoodwinked!, one of the first fully independently funded computer animated films, and creating the webcomic Roger Cosmonkey, which was posted through his Twitter account, and has been described as the world's first episodic Twitter series. In April 2012 it was revealed that the title of the series would be Krogzilla Gets a Job, and that it would air on the channel Shut Up! Cartoons, established by the internet comedy duo Smosh, which already ran the third most-subscribed to channel on YouTube. Shut Up! Cartoons would launch on April 30 of that year, and air eighteen short animated web series over the course of its first year. Krogzilla was the fourth of these series to air.

According to Edwards, the series' humor is derived from putting a fantastic creature in ordinary situations. He explained that while he was working on Hoodwinked!, he realized that "The more ordinary the animals’ conversations were, the funnier it was." As such, he decided that none of the characters in the series would react to Krogzilla as though he were unusual. Instead, Edwards explained, everyone would see him as "just some dude that’s a little weird." In addition to Hoodwinked!, Edwards has compared the series' style of humor to The Office, Louie, and New Girl. He has also stated that he wanted the show to serve as a metaphor for those who lost their jobs and had to find alternative employment in recent years.

Edwards' wife created the character of Jeff, as she felt that the initial plan for the series wasn't weird enough for its target audience. Edwards was shocked by his wife's suggestion, which he found uncharacteristic of her, but came to appreciate the idea. He realized that the hot-tempered character of Jeff could serve as a foil to the more laid back character of Krogzilla, and patterned him on the concept of an annoying roommate. He stressed that while he knows many people named Jeff, he did not base the character off of any of them, but instead felt that the common name was a humorous match for the bizarre character. Edwards created the character of Marcus so that series could have at least one normal character, and wouldn't be overwhelmed with eccentricity.

Edwards took on the lead role of Krogzilla himself, and cast his friend Josh Greene in the recurring roles of Jeff and Marcus. He felt that the two roles comprised different extremities of Greene's personality, and described scenes that featured dialogue between the two characters as "like hearing a 'Jeckle and Hyde' routine." According to Greene, he approached the role of Jeff by channeling the love child of Al Pacino and Gilbert Godfried. Both Greene and Ken Marino, who was cast in the recurring role of Krogzilla's nemesis Regurgitor, had previously collaborated with Edwards on Hoodwinked!

Edwards found creating a series for the internet to be an enjoyable experience, largely due to the immediate feedback that would come from viewers, and the significant amount of creative freedom that he was given. He explained that most of the restrictions placed on him by Smosh seemed obvious, and included a ban on R-rated swears, nudity, drug use, smoking, and references to smoking. He also explained that he was pressured to keep the show from relying on long segments of dialogue, though he personally felt that the dialogue was an important factor to the show.

== Production ==
Much of the voice recording was done with multiple actors in the recording booth at one time. This was a new method for Edwards, and he explained that he did it to "allow for those messy, unrehearsed moments that can happen when the actors 'bump into each other' a little more." Mark Keefer, who had previously collaborated with Edwards on Hoodwinked!, served as the sound designer and re-recording mixer on the series, while Josh Greene served as the sound engineer. Dialogue was recorded at Greene's studio Squareplay Entertainment. Greene also wrote the series' theme song, and styled it after jazzy vintage TV themes from the 1960s, as requested by Edwards. Ryan Hostetler served as the Animation Producer, and his company, Silly Monster Media created the animation with Flash animation. Many character designs created by Edwards could not be used due to the series' small budget, and instead certain designs were used for multiple characters by making alterations to them.

== Reception ==
The first episode of Krogzilla reached 219,000 views in its first day. By the release of the third episode, the entire series had garnered over 750,000 views.

The series was listed as one of the best online animated web series by USA Today.

The series was nominated for Best Animated Web Series by the International Academy of Web Television, but lost to Red vs. Blue.

== Future ==
Cory Edwards has expressed interest in returning for a second season, and explained that the title of each season would change to reflect a new goal that Krogzilla must accomplish. He has suggested Krogzilla Goes to College and Krogzilla Gets a Date as possible titles of future seasons.
