= Todd Edwards (screenwriter) =

American film director, producer, and writer

- Born: September 17, 1971 (age 54); Grand Rapids, Michigan, U.S.
- Occupation(s): screenwriter, producer, film director, writer

Todd Edwards (born September 17, 1971) is an American screenwriter/producer, film director, and writer working in Los Angeles. He was born in Grand Rapids, Michigan.

His first film was Chillicothe which premiered at the Sundance Film Festival in 1999, in which he wrote, directed, and acted.

Edwards was co-creator, co-director, writer, actor, song writer, and visionary behind the 2005 animated film Hoodwinked!, in conjunction with brother Cory Edwards and Tony Leech and released by The Weinstein Company. He then contributed to the writing of Hoodwinked Too! Hood vs. Evil released by Maurice Kanbar, the 2011 sequel to Hoodwinked!.

In 2010, he directed, co-wrote, acted and composed the feature film Jeffie Was Here.

In 2011, he co-founded Hardy Howl Films with producer/writer Katie Hooten and producer/writer Timothy Hooten.

His older brother, Cory Edwards, is also a screenwriter, producer, director and actor.
