= Hoodwinked Too! Hood vs. Evil =

2011 film directed by Mike Disa

- Theatrical release poster
- Directed by: Mike Disa
- Screenplay by: Cory Edwards; Todd Edwards; Tony Leech; Mike Disa
- Story by: Cory Edwards; Todd Edwards; Tony Leech
- Produced by: Maurice Kanbar; Joan Collins Carey
- Starring: Glenn Close; Cheech and Chong; Bill Hader; Hayden Panettiere; Amy Poehler; Martin Short
- Edited by: Tom Sanders; Robert Anich
- Music by: Murray Gold
- Production company: Kanbar Entertainment
- Distributed by: The Weinstein Company
- Release dates: April 23, 2011 (Tribeca Film Festival); April 29, 2011 (United States)
- Running time: 87 minutes
- Country: United States
- Language: English
- Budget: $30 million
- Box office: $23.1 million

Hoodwinked Too! Hood vs. Evil is a 2011 American animated comedy film directed by Mike Disa and written by Disa, Cory Edwards, Todd Edwards, and Tony Leech. The sequel to Hoodwinked! (2005), it features the voices of Glenn Close, Cheech and Chong, Bill Hader, Hayden Panettiere, Amy Poehler, and Martin Short. In the sequel, Red and Wolf team up to rescue Hansel and Gretel and Granny from an evil witch.

Hoodwinked Too! Hood vs. Evil was released in the United States on April 29, 2011, by the Weinstein Company. Unlike its predecessor, the film received generally negative reviews from critics and was a box-office disappointment, grossing $23.1 million worldwide against a $30 million budget. Additionally, Kanbar Entertainment sued the Weinstein Company for multiple reasons surrounding the film.

== Plot ==
Sometime after the events of the first film, Red Pucket, her Granny, the Big Bad Wolf and Twitchy join the Happily Ever After Agency. (Note: As depicted in Hoodwinked! (2005)) Wolf, Granny, and Twitchy attempt to rescue Hansel and Gretel from an evil witch, but the plan fails and Granny is kidnapped. Meanwhile, Red trains with the Sisters of the Hood and learns that a secret, all-powerful truffle recipe has been stolen. Detective Nicky Flippers assigns Red, Wolf, and Twitchy to recover it and rescue Granny.

At the Giant's nightclub, the group learns from his harp that the imprisoned Boingo has been sending specific ingredients to the witch, who escapes after narrowly avoiding capture. Red and Wolf blame each other for her escape, causing the team to split up.

The witch attempts to force Granny to recreate the stolen recipe. Granny escapes and finds Hansel and Gretel, only to discover that they are the true masterminds. Recaptured, she learns that the witch is Verushka Van Vine, her former classmate from the Sisters of the Hood. Verushka, once second best to Granny, became jealous of her achievements and joined Hansel and Gretel to seek revenge.

After Twitchy persuades Wolf to apologise to Red, he encounters The Three Pigs, now mercenaries employed by Hansel and Gretel, and barely escapes. Wolf and Twitchy return to the damaged, abandoned agency headquarters. While travelling to Verushka's lair, they rescue Red, who had been captured after attempting to infiltrate it alone. The three reconcile and infiltrate the siblings' base with help from Kirk the Woodsman and his yodeling troupe, Der Happy Yodelers. Red inadvertently reveals that macadamia nuts are the final ingredient, allowing the truffles to be completed.

Hansel and Gretel consume the truffles, which dramatically increase their size, strength, and durability, making them effectively invincible. They rampage through the city before betraying Verushka and stealing her case of additional truffles, leaving her to be eaten by Bitsy, a giant spider previously seen on surveillance footage. Granny, Red, Wolf, and Twitchy persuade Verushka and Bitsy to join them. They trick Hansel and Gretel into eating more truffles, causing them to grow so large that they can no longer move their legs. They are arrested and imprisoned, where they are forced to follow a healthy diet and exercise regime.

Red and Wolf continue their adventures after receiving reports of a man with a flute being chased by 10,000 mice, ending the film.

== Voice cast ==
- Hayden Panettiere as Red Puckett. Panettiere replaced Anne Hathaway from the first film.
- Patrick Warburton as Wolf W. Wolf
- Glenn Close as Abigail "Granny" Puckett
- Joan Cusack as Verushka Van Vine
- David Ogden Stiers as Nicky Flippers. This was his last animated feature before his death in 2018.
- Bill Hader as Hansel
- Amy Poehler as Gretel
- Martin Short as Kirk the Woodsman. Short replaced Jim Belushi from the first film.
- Cory Edwards as Twitchy the Squirrel
- Cheech Marin as Mad Hog
- Tommy Chong as Stone
- Phil LaMarr as Wood
- Brad Garrett as The Giant
- Wayne Newton as Jimmy 10-Strings
- Benjy Gaither as Japeth
- Andy Dick as Boingo
- Debra Wilson as Iana
- David Alan Grier as Moss the Troll
- Lance J. Holt as Klaus / Hench Pig #4
- Mike Disa as Helmut, Spider, Rhino, and Agent 1 & 2
- Heidi Klum as Heidi
- Rebecca Andersen as Radio Voice
- Danny Pudi as Little Boy Blue
- Frank Welker as Animals' Vocal Effects (Excluding Spider)/Additional Voices

Additional voices by Kirk Baily, Jack Blessing, Melendy Britt, June Christopher, Brian T. Delaney, Mike Disa, Nicholas Guest, Kyle Herbert, Bridget Hoffman, Sandra Holt, Erin Lander, Wendee Lee, Al Rodrigo, Stephanie Sheh, Keith Silverstein, Marcelo Tubert, Kari Wahlgren, and Lisa Wilhoit.

== Production ==
=== Development ===
Hoodwinked! was one of the first fully independently funded computer animated films, and was produced on a budget of under $8 million, considerably less than the budget of most studio produced animated films. The film was directed by Cory Edwards, who co-wrote with co-directors Todd Edwards and Tony Leech, and was produced by Kanbar Entertainment and Kanbar Animation, with distribution by the Weinstein Company, which did not sign on until near the end of production. It was released in December 2005 to mixed reviews, and financial success, earning over $110 million worldwide. In January 2006, Cory Edwards confirmed that a Hoodwinked! sequel, titled Hoodwinked Too! Hood vs. Evil, was in the works and that a basic treatment had already been completed. The following month, Edwards announced that he, Todd Edwards, and Leech were writing the sequel, though they would not return to direct as Cory Edwards cited to focus on other projects, particularly live-action films. He explained that there had been a tense working relationship between him and some of the "key players on the first film". He also questioned the integrity of the fractured fairytale genre of which Hoodwinked is a part, calling it, "a trend I groaned about even as I finished the film." Initially, the film was going to be independently funded by Kanbar, with the Weinstein Company distributing, as had been done with the previous film; however the two companies entered into a co-financing agreement, at the behest of the Weinstein Company.

"I was at Disney Feature Animation for nearly 10 years and I never once got to work on a story about a human girl who didn't spend the entire film trying to get the right date. Aside from the obvious story limitations this presented, it always gave me a nagging sense of guilt. Was this the only kind of animated female characters I wanted my daughter, or my sons for that matter, exposed to? When The Weinstein Company offered me the chance to direct Hoodwinked Too! Hood vs. Evil, I jumped at it. Ten pages into the script I realized that this was not the typical romantic formula thrust upon animated films with female leads."

— Mike Disa

In March 2007 it was announced that Mike Disa, who had long worked in the animation industry, would make his directorial debut on the film. While Disa had not seen the original film before being approached to direct the sequel, Cory Edwards expressed enthusiasm over his involvement, saying that he "has a real passion for the film and a devotion to maintaining the Hoodwinked world. He wants to do the sequel justice and he really gets what we're trying to do". Disa explained in a 2011 column for The Huffington Post that he was impressed by how the gender roles in the film contrasted to those typically portrayed by Disney.

Disa recruited art director Ryan Carlson and animator Jeff Siergey to respectively serve as production designer and head of story. Disa credited Carlson with expanding the environment of Hoodwinked! from a lone village to a "vast and intricate and unique world" for the sequel. Due to the film's limited budget compared to their other studio projects, Disa, Carlson and Siergey closely collaborated with each other in planning out "99.9 percent of all the designs and characters" before the film was storyboarded.

=== Casting ===
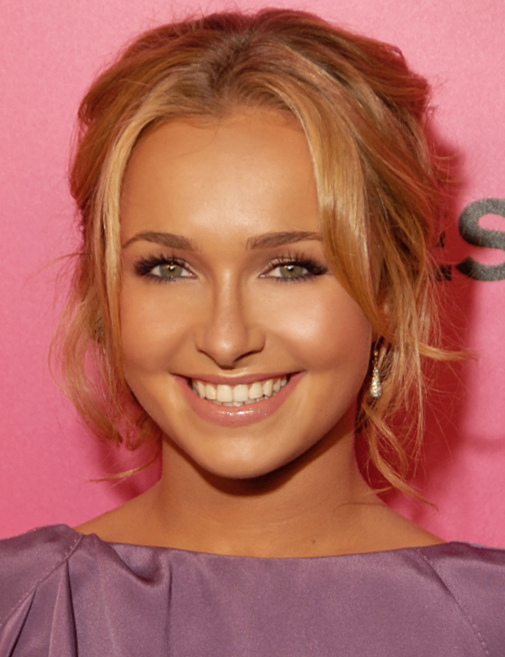
Hayden Panettiere
(Red)

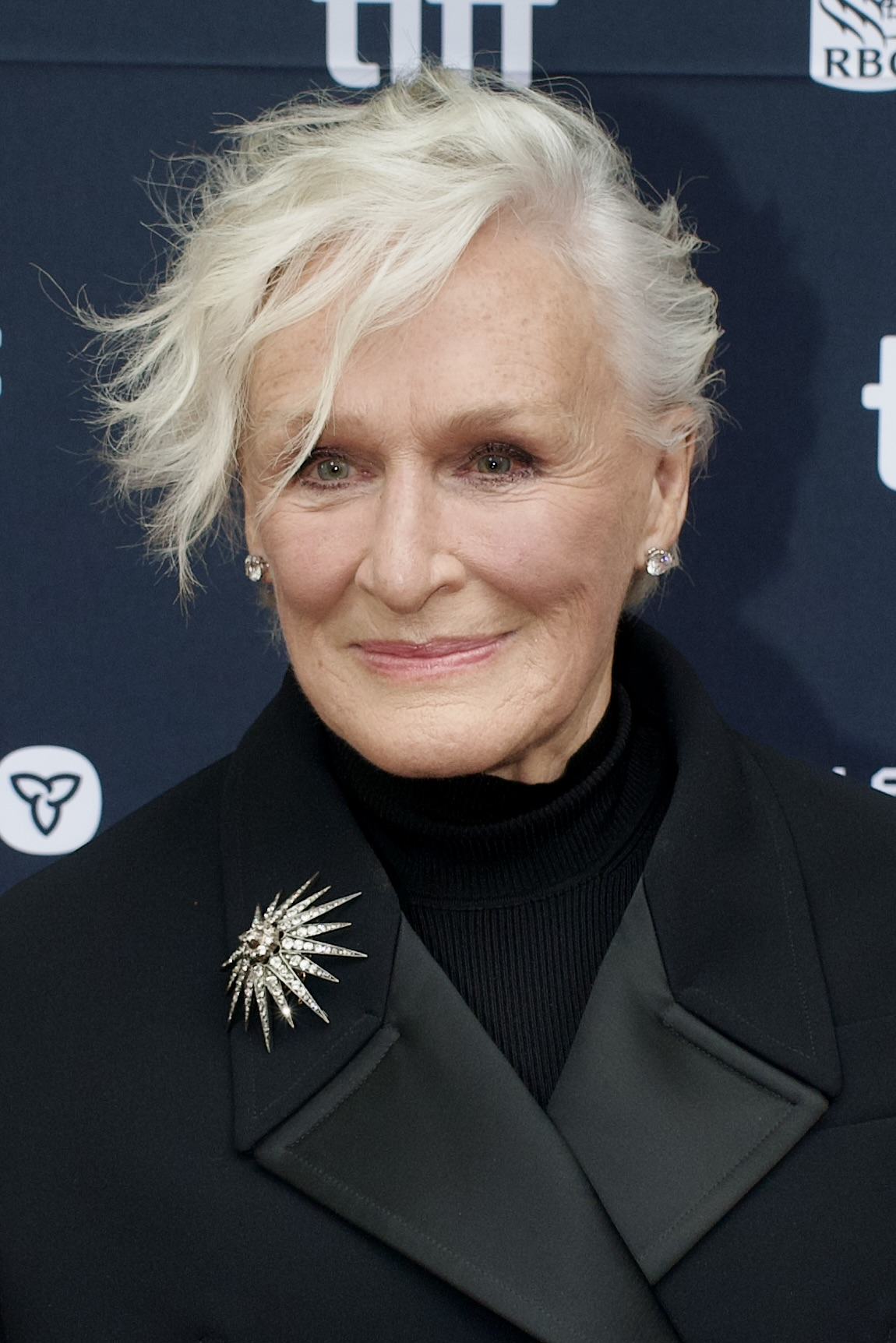
Glenn Close
(Granny)

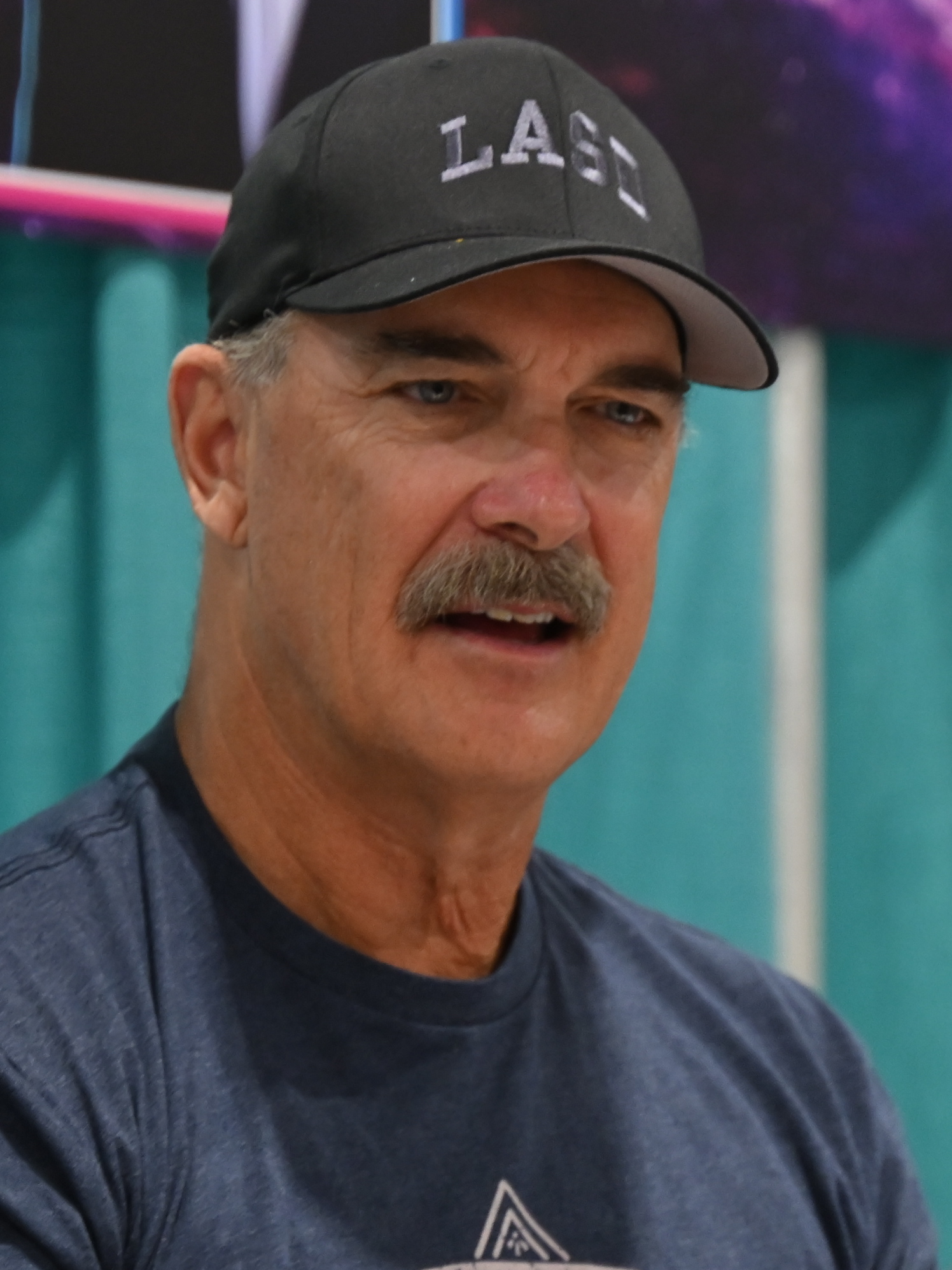
Patrick Warburton
(Wolf)

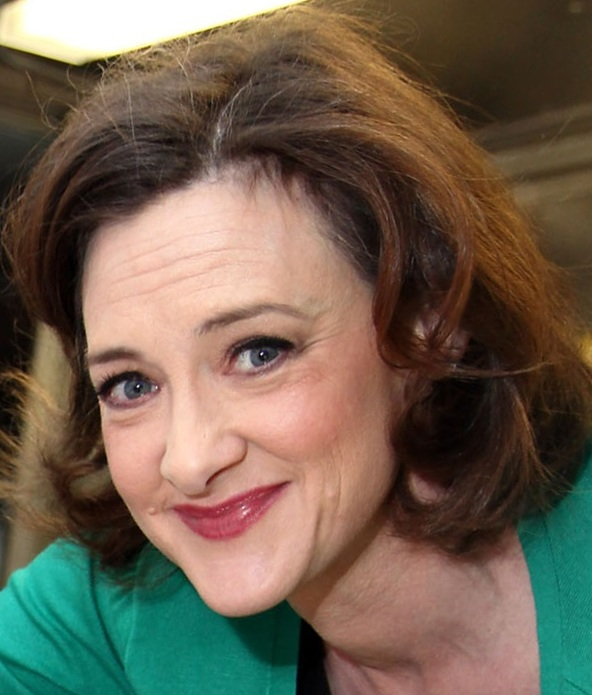
Joan Cusack
(Verushka)

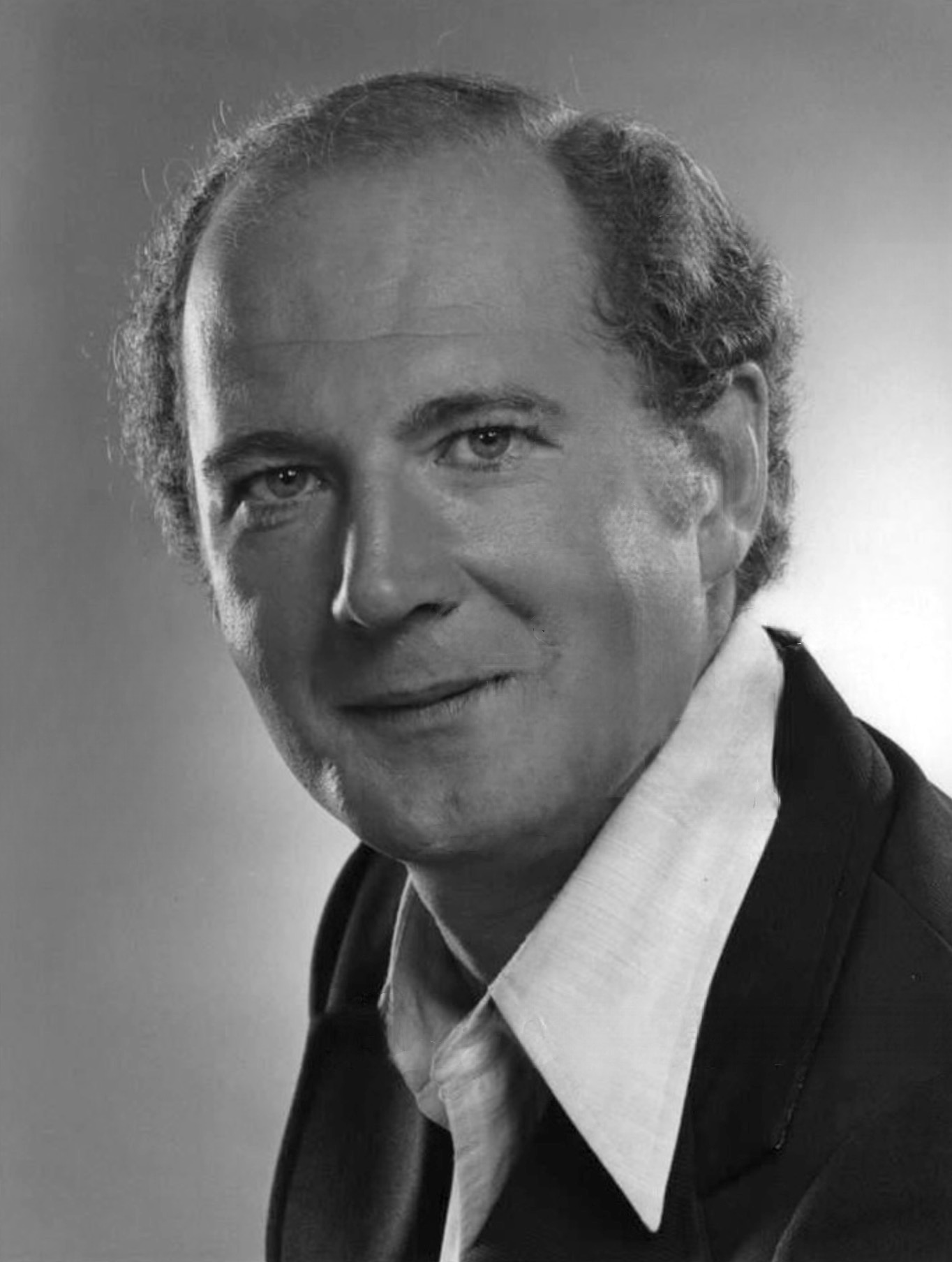
David Ogden Stiers
(Nicky Flippers)

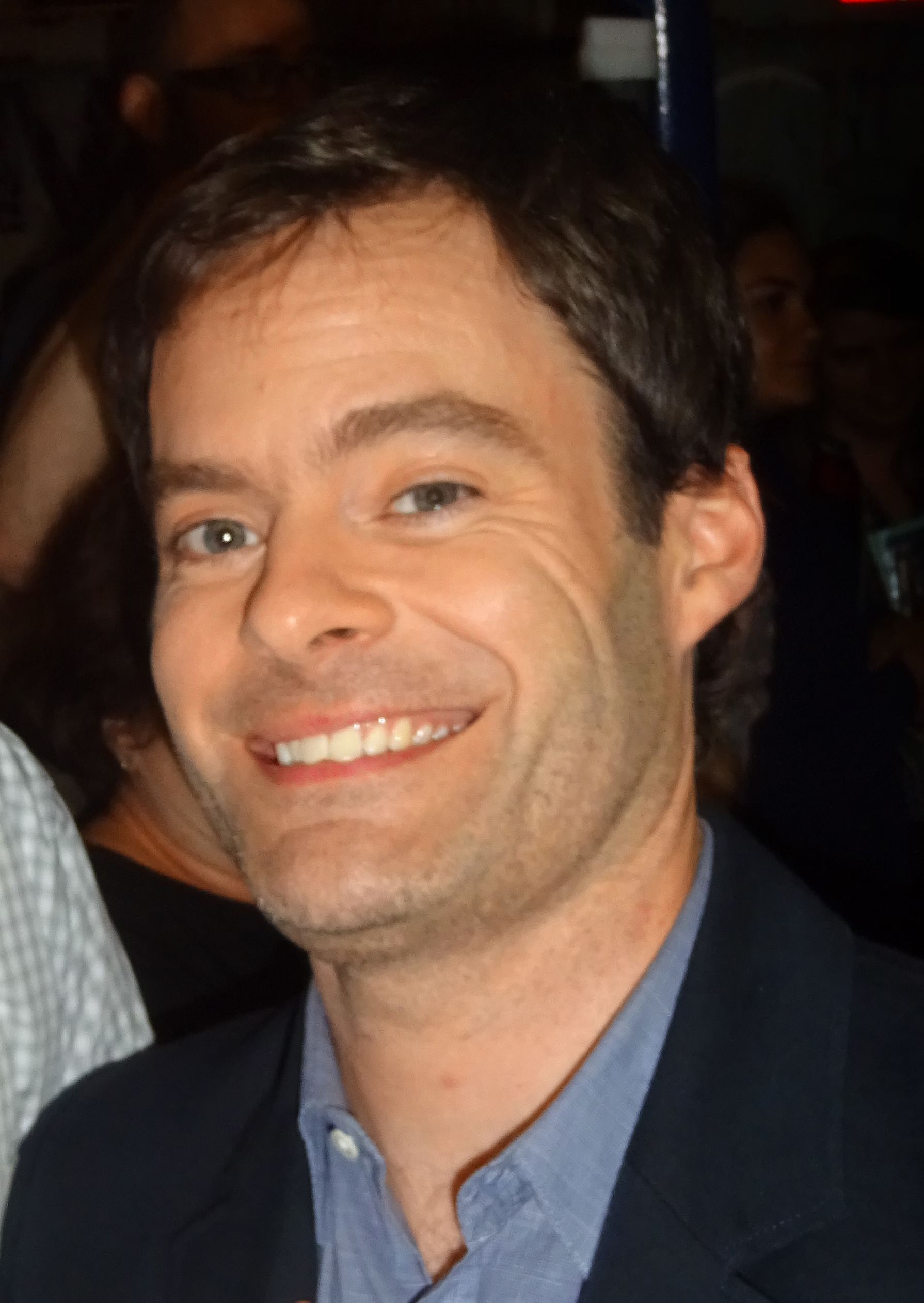
Bill Hader
(Hansel)

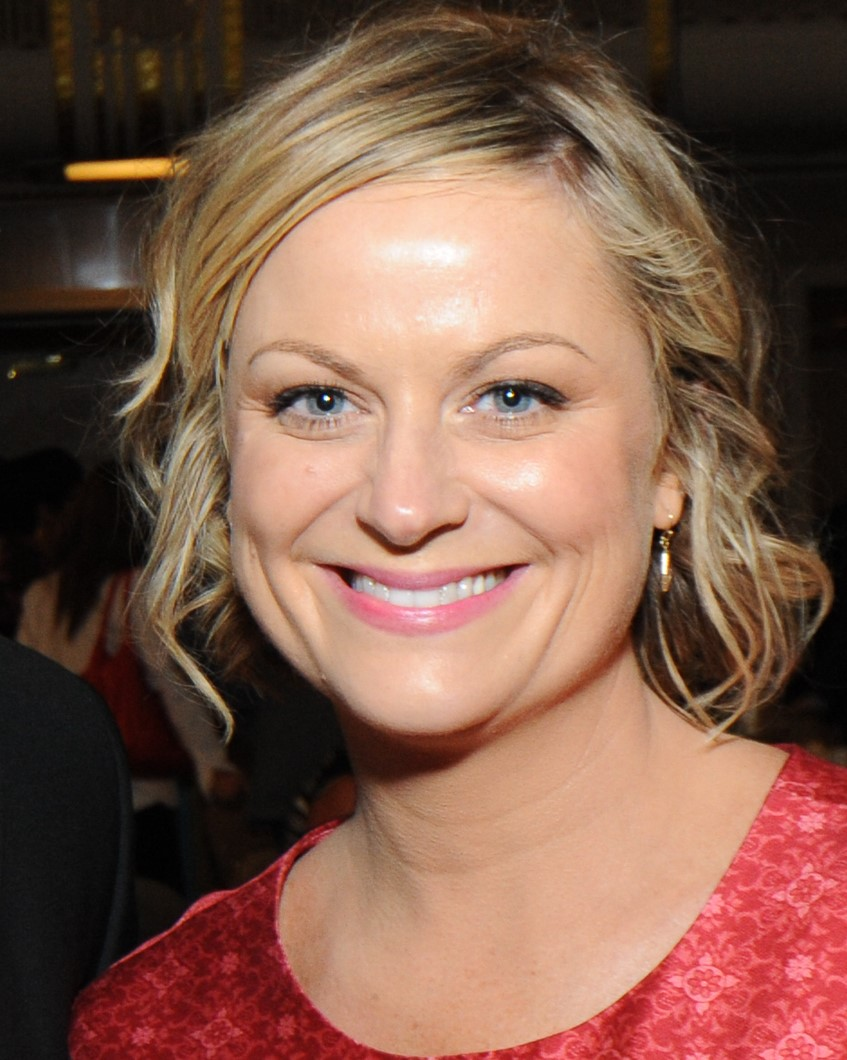
Amy Poehler
(Gretel)

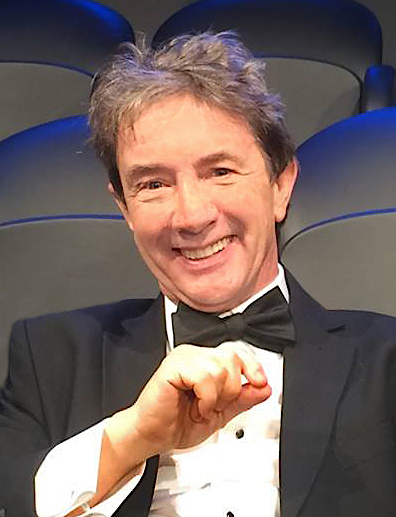
Martin Short
(Kirk Kirkendall)

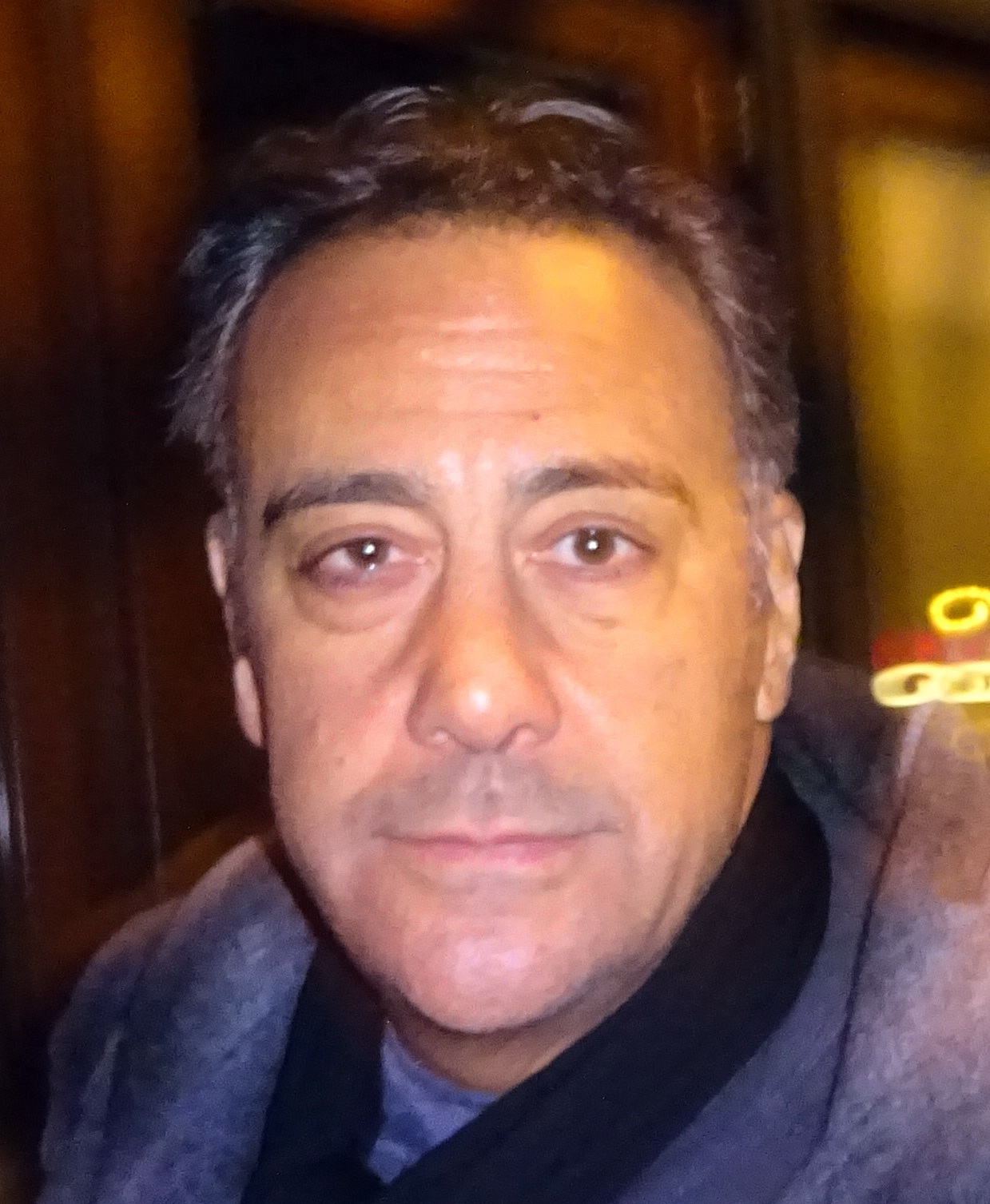
Brad Garrett
(Giant)

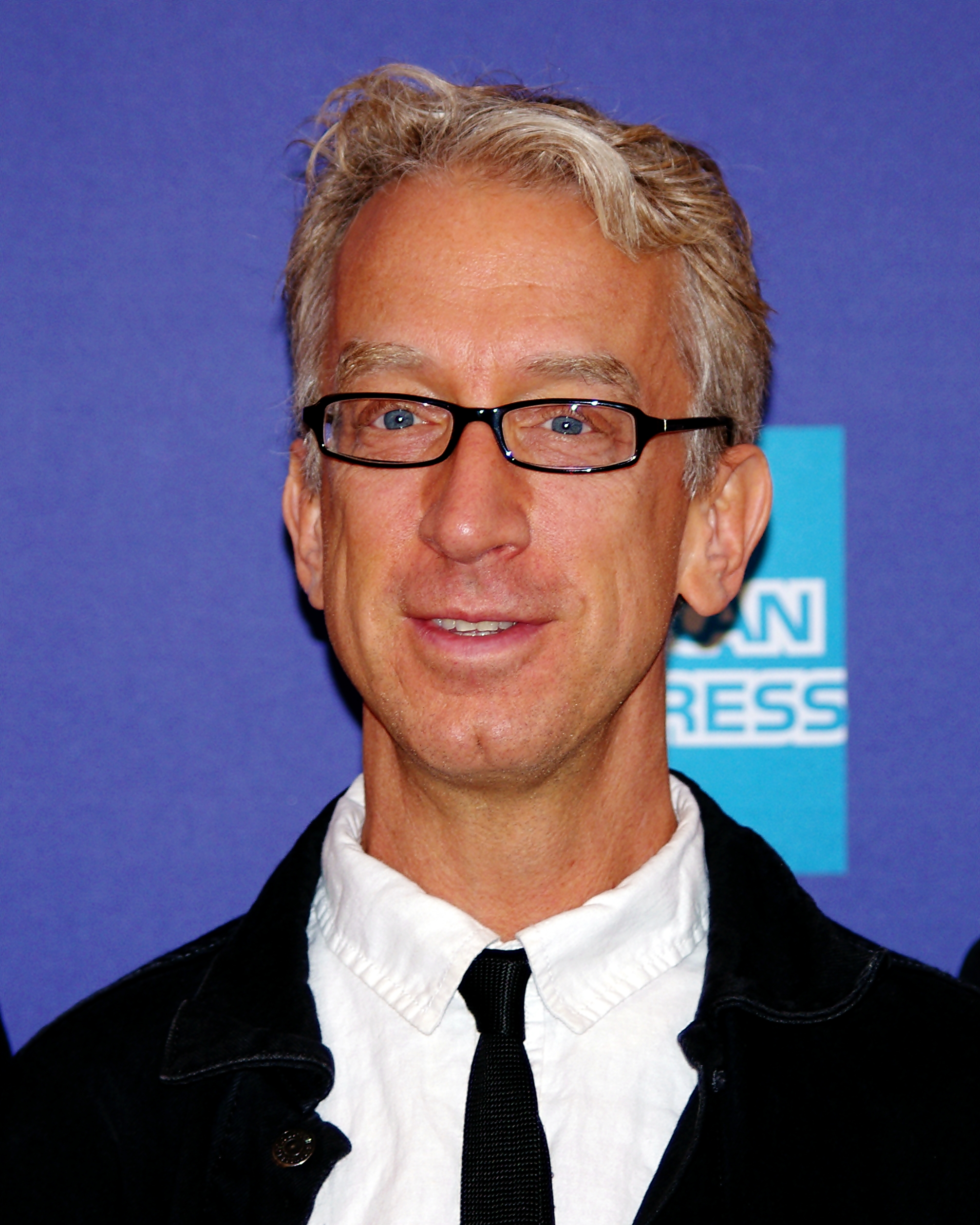
Andy Dick
(Boingo)

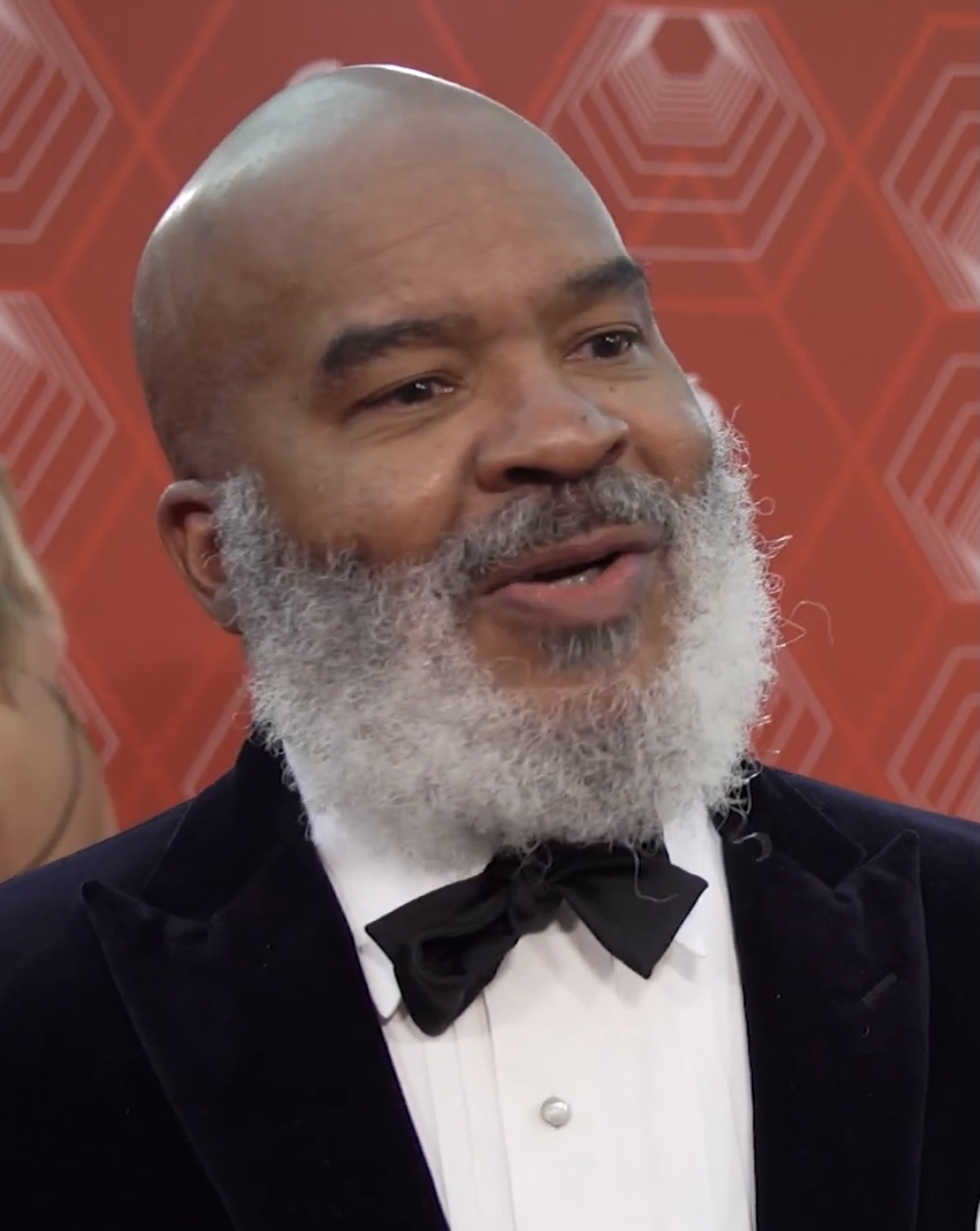
David Alan Grier
(Moss the Troll)

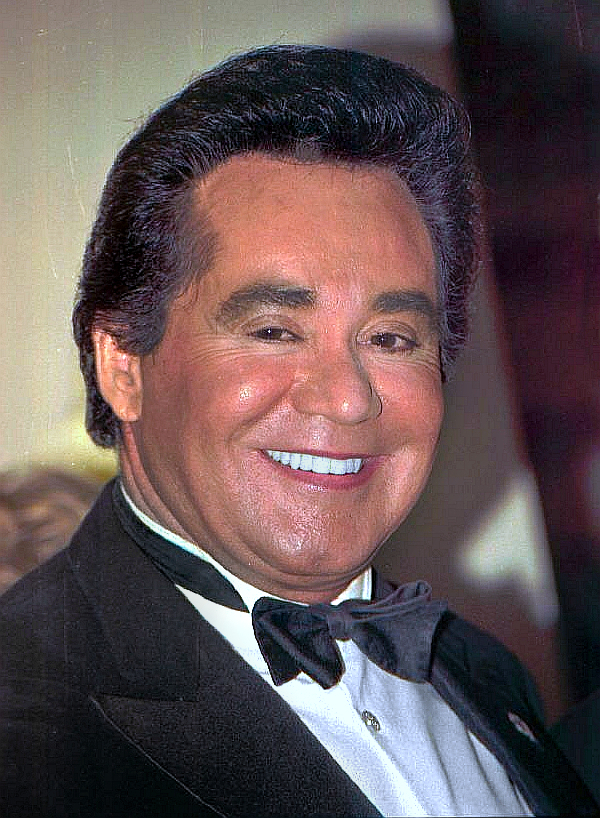
Wayne Newton
(Jimmy 10-Strings)

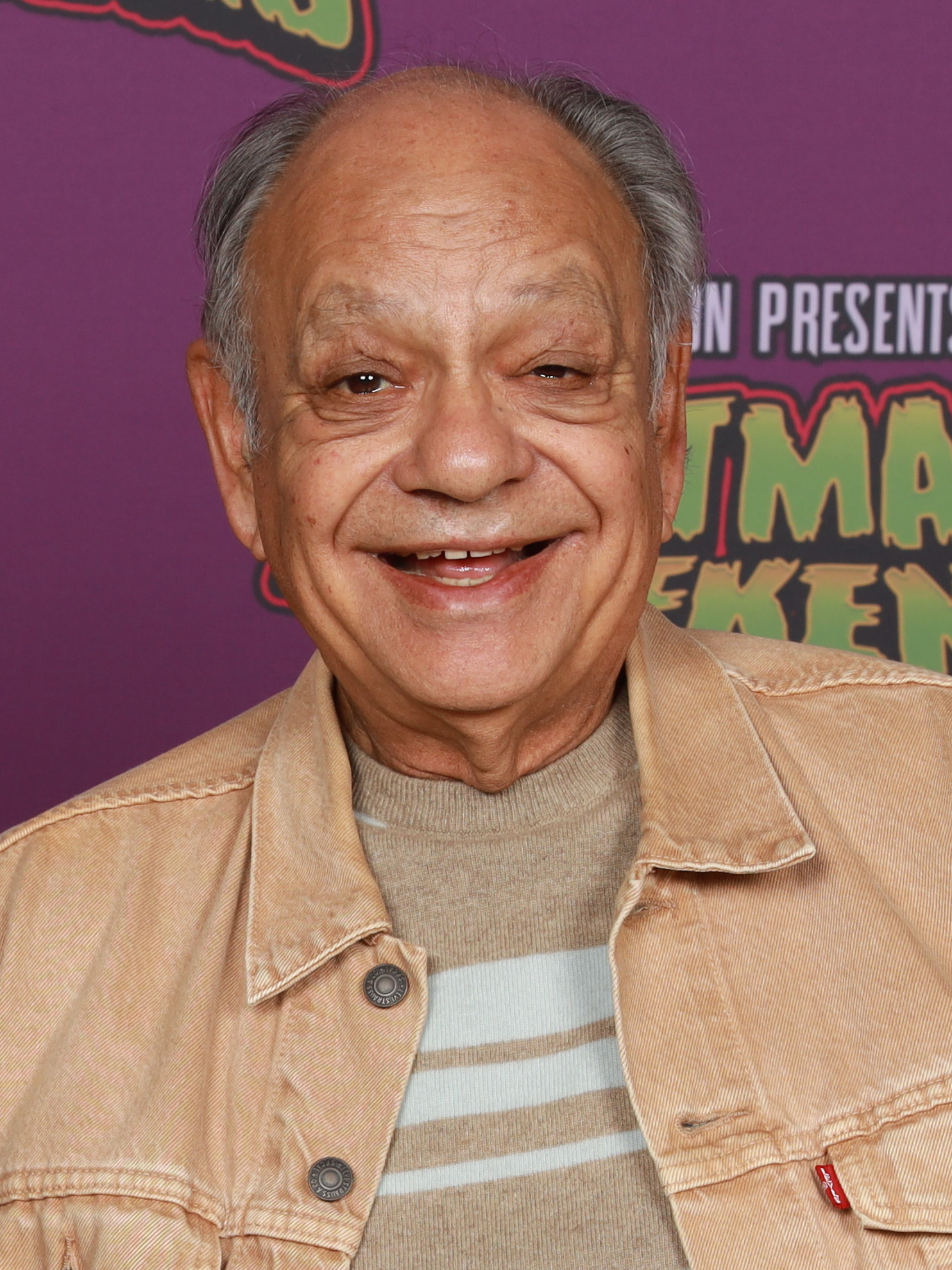
Cheech Marin
(Mad Hog)

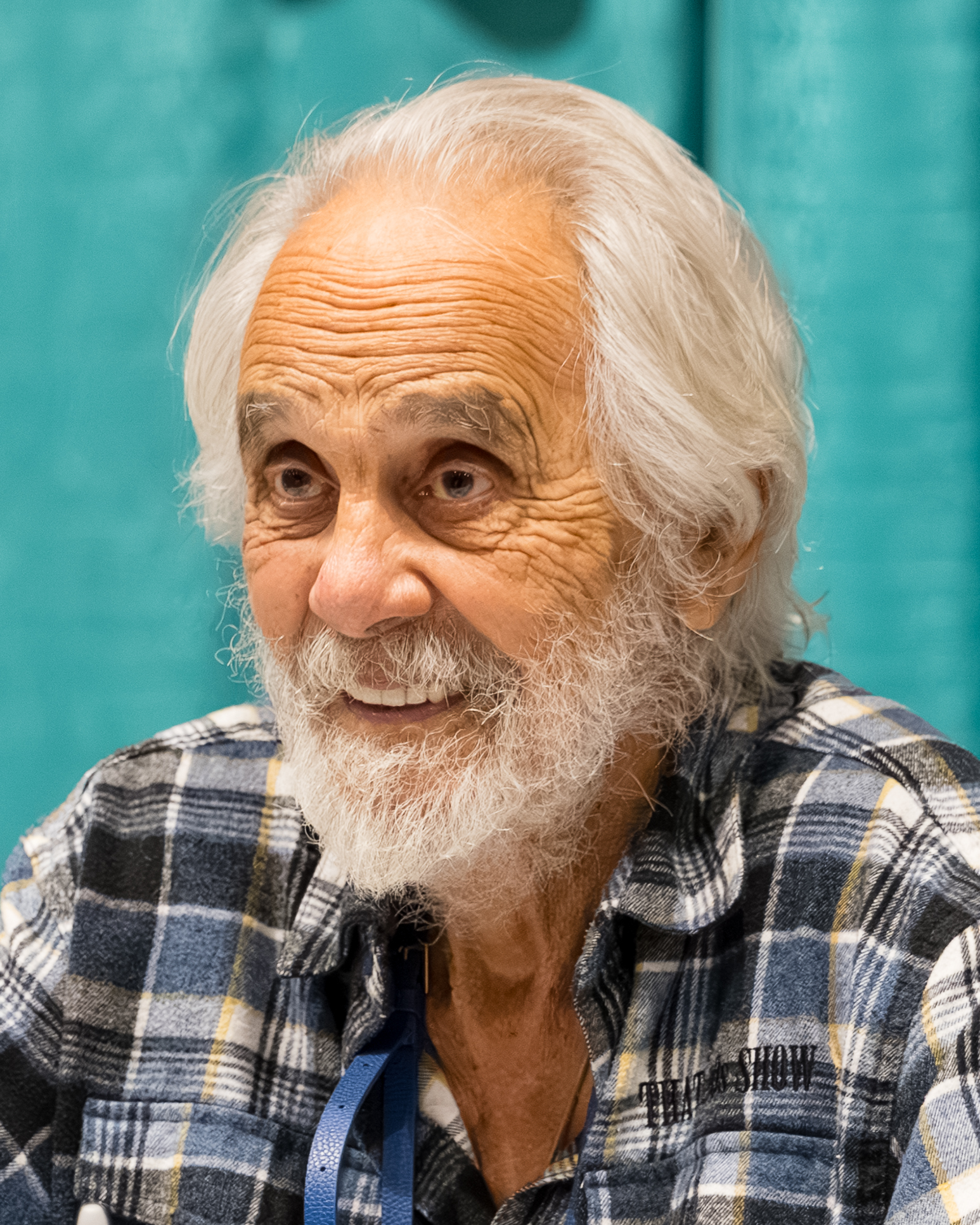
Tommy Chong
(Stone)

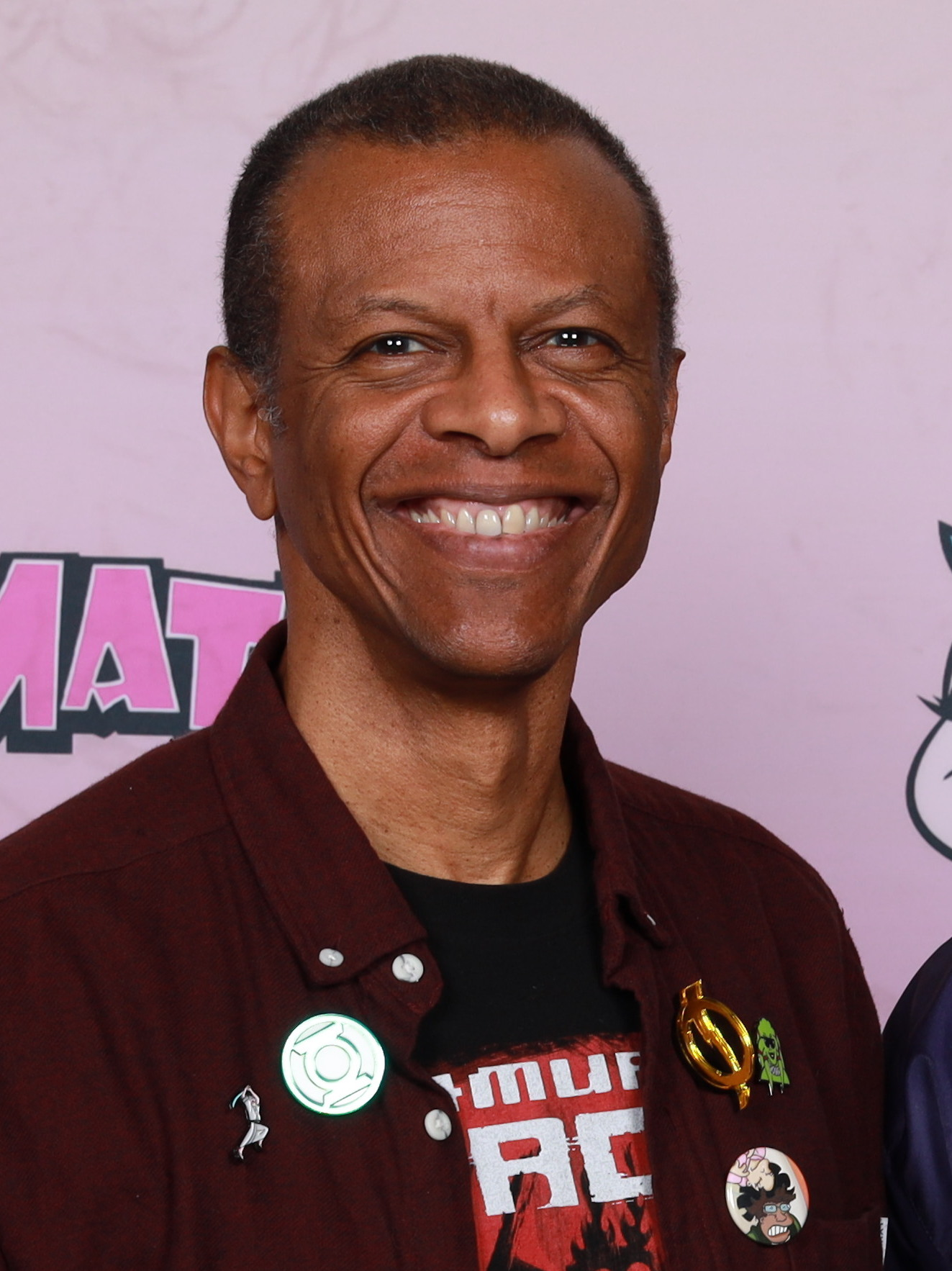
Phil LaMarr
(Wood)

While most of the cast reprised their roles from the first film, Hayden Panettiere replaced Anne Hathaway in the role of Red, while Martin Short replaced Jim Belushi in the role of Kirk the Woodsman. Cory Edwards explained that the role of Red was recast due to the recent success of Hathaway's career, saying "It's clear to me that her involvement in the first film was a nice favor for Harvey and the last of her "little girl roles".... You can see how a sequel to an animated film is not in her trajectory anymore". Regarding Belushi's departure from the series, Edwards explained, "he was never really comfortable with the accent for the Woodsman. He wanted to help us out and loved the film, but he kept saying, 'I'm not an accent guy'. So he had a hard time connecting to that character".

Whereas in the first film, the voice of the character Twitchy was created simply by speeding up the recording by 50%, various speeds were used in this film and occasionally the dialogue was only pitched higher without being sped up at all. The difference in Twitchy's voice was immediately noticed by fans after the release of the film's trailer, causing Twitchy's voice actor Cory Edwards to relate that while he had explained to the new filmmakers how the voice was created in the first film and would remark on how the character sounded different when invited to screenings, "from the many blank stares and the end result, nobody really cared".

Disa praised Patrick Warburton's reprisal as the Wolf, feeling that he could play subtext, comedy and rhythm while giving real emotion concurrently. He also enjoyed working with Wayne Newton, who voiced Jimmy 10-Strings, for whom Newton took inspiration from the "Mickey and the Beanstalk" segment of Fun and Fancy Free (1947), a Disney package film both Newton and Disa grew up with.

=== Animation ===
While the first film's animation was produced by a small group of independent animators in the Philippines, this film's animation was produced by the Toronto-based animation studio Arc Productions instead. Maya was used to create the film's animation. Rendering was done on Mental Ray, compositing was done on Fusion, and matte paintings were created on Adobe Photoshop. But the visual effects were created on Maya and Houdini. Stereo Pictures, a South Korean studio owned by Warner Bros., handled the stereoscopic 3D services.

Disa explained that in designing the locations for the film they considered "the idea of a modern fairy tale in modern times" asking themselves, "what would a fairy tale city look like having evolved for hundreds of years? What would their buildings look like, how would they get around" and saying, "We sat down and worked out the technology and mythology of the world of Hoodwinked that they hadn't really established in the first film."

Animation for the film was deemed finished by 2009, with Disa going on to direct two animated film adaptations of Electronic Arts video games (Dante's Inferno: An Animated Epic and Dead Space: Aftermath) while awaiting the greenlight to convert Hoodwinked Too into stereoscopic 3D.

=== Lawsuit ===
Hoodwinked Too! Hood vs. Evil was originally set to be released on January 15, 2010; however, in December 2009, it was announced that the release date would be pushed back to February at the earliest. A Weinstein Company executive stated that some of the reasons were so that the company could focus its resources on promoting Youth in Revolt which would be released January 8 of that year and so that they could perform some tweaks on the film's animation. He also stated that the Weinstein Company was in the final stages of a marketing deal with a fast food chain.

Burger King released toys for the film in January 2010, shortly after the film's initial release date had passed, even though a new release date had not yet been set.

In March 2010, it was revealed that Kanbar Entertainment was suing the Weinstein Company for delaying the film's release, for not making contributions to monthly production accounts after February 2009, and for not consulting them about a release strategy. Kanbar Entertainment also stated that The Weinstein Company did not respond to proposed changes to the film, even though Kanbar Entertainment had final authority on production decisions.

In February 2011 the first trailer and poster for the film were released and a new release date for April 29, 2011 was finally announced.

=== Music ===
Two soundtrack albums were released for the film: Hoodwinked Too! Hood vs. Evil (Original Motion Picture Soundtrack), featuring the film's original and licensed songs heard in the film, were released on April 26, 2011 by Lakeshore Records. Hoodwinked Too! Hood vs. Evil (Original Motion Picture Score) featuring the film's original score, composed by Murray Gold, Tom Keane and Dean Landon, and additional music by Christopher Tin, was released on May 17.

== Release ==
=== Box office ===
Unlike its predecessor, Hoodwinked Too! Hood vs. Evil was a box office bomb. The film placed number six at the box office for its opening weekend, during which it grossed $4,108,630 across 2,505 theatres, averaging $1,640 per venue. The film fell to number ten in the box office for its second weekend, declining 50.3%, and dropped out of the top ten for its third weekend. This paled in comparison to the first film which opened to $12,401,900, placing number three in the box office for its opening weekend, and ultimately placing in the top ten for a total of five weeks. Over the course of its theatrical run Hoodwinked Too! Hood vs. Evil took in $10,143,779 at the domestic box office, and $23.1 million worldwide, earning back less than its budget, and falling short of its predecessor which earned $51,386,611 domestically, and $110,013,167 worldwide. Hoodwinked Too! Hood vs. Evil followed a pattern of animated sequels released in 2011 financially underperforming in comparison to their predecessors.

=== Critical response ===
Once upon a time, fairy tales were told with beauty, wit, simplicity and charm, a tradition that seems increasingly a thing of the past in "Hoodwinked Too! Hood vs. Evil." Less a movie than an ill-advised lab experiment in which classic children's stories are injected with Bond-movie stylings, inane wisecracks and martial-arts mayhem, this manic misfire takes storybook revisionism to ever more irritating ends.

— Justin Chang

Hoodwinked Too! Hood vs. Evil received generally negative reviews. On the review aggregator Rotten Tomatoes, the film has garnered an approval rating of 11% based on 65 reviews, with an average rating of 3.39/10. The website's critical consensus reads, "It may add 3D to the original, but Hoodwinked Too! is missing the first installment's wit and refreshingly low-budget charm." On Metacritic, another review aggregator website, it holds a weighted average score of 20 out of 100, indicating "generally unfavorable" reviews.

Claudia Puig of USA Today said that "Hoodwinked Too! Hood vs. Evil is memorable for being one of the most obnoxious animated movies of recent years. If ever there was a movie that should have gone straight to video — or better yet, never have been made — this is it." Roger Moore writing for the Orlando Sentinel gave the film two stars out of four, criticizing the story as "nothing more than a series of martial-arts video-game 'levels' for small children", though praising the voice work of Bill Hader and Amy Poehler whose casting as Hansel and Gretel he considered "inspired". Todd McCarthy of The Hollywood Reporter considered the film to be "one of the most obnoxious and least necessary animated films of the century thus far".

Even many of the critics who enjoyed the first film were disappointed with the sequel. Michael Phillips of the Chicago Tribune gave the film one star and said it "leeches the fun clean out of the first Hoodwinked", and Michael O'Sullivan of The Washington Post wrote that, "while the first film was lifted out of mediocrity by an utterly delightful storyline ... the sequel is a flat, plodding and largely mirthless affair."

In sharp contrast with other reviews, Nell Minow of the Chicago Sun-Times gave Hoodwinked Too! three stars, praising the film's strong heroines and the script, stating "once again what we think we know about fairy-tale heroines, villains, mean girls, old ladies, witches and happy endings are deliciously turned upside down and inside out".

As with the first Hoodwinked film, many reviews were critical of the film's animation. In his review for The New York Times, Andy Webster criticized the film's animation, stating "the images don't remotely approach the nuance of, say, Ice Age, let alone anything from the mack daddy, Pixar. And while it seems there's no getting away from this marketing aesthetic, the resemblance at times to a video game is far, far too acute. The Shrek films — in visual terms — have done this kind of thing better." Michael O'Sullivan of The Washington Post said that the film "suffer[s] from a stylistic stiffness" and called the characters "clunky and ungainly".

In December 2011, Chris Knight of the National Post listed Hoodwinked Too! on his "worst 10 films of 2011".

Cory Edwards expressed disappointment with the second film, insinuating that it would not hold much appeal for anyone older than ten, and saying that it was "deflating to give this thing away and watch others run with it in ways I would not." He also expressed disappointment with major edits that had been made to the original script. Warburton has voiced similar sentiments. He has said that the film has less of a "soul" than its predecessor, attributing this problem to the diminished involvement of the Edwards brothers and Tony Leech. "I feel like the original guys got screwed", he said, although he qualified this answer with an acknowledgement that he knows little of the film's behind-the-scenes struggles. Working on the sequel left such a weak impression on him, that only two years after the film's release, he owned to barely even remembering the production process.

=== Home media ===
Hoodwinked Too! Hood vs. Evil was released on DVD, Blu-ray, and Blu-ray 3D combo pack on August 16, 2011.

In October 2025, after years of unavailability on streaming and rental services, Content Partners, LLC acquired ownership and derivative rights to Hoodwinked! and Hoodwinked Too! Hood vs. Evil from Kanbar Entertainment, licensing North American distribution rights to Sony Pictures and international rights to TWC's successor-in-interest Lionsgate.

=== Streaming ===
Hoodwinked Too! Hood vs. Evil became available to stream on Tubi in the United States on March 1, 2026 under Sony Pictures Television.

== Mobile games ==
A mobile game, Red's Escape, was released for iOS on August 16, 2011 by an unknown developer. A second mobile game titled Hoodwinked Too: Decoder Game was released for Android on April 29, 2011 by InterWorks Inc., and was taken off of the Android Store in 2013.
