= Katie Hooten =

American actress and film producer

Katie Hooten is an American actress and film producer. She is married to Timothy Hooten, and is the sister of filmmakers Cory Edwards and Todd Edwards. As a child she participated in theatre, and along with her brothers, made Super 8 home videos. She is a graduate of Anderson University, of which her father is the president. After performing with her brothers and her husband in the 1999 independent film Chillicothe, directed by Todd Edwards, she joined The Walt Disney Company, working as a post-production coordinator on the films Atlantis: The Lost Empire, Spirited Away, and Lilo & Stitch, and as an assistant production manager on the short films Destino and Lorenzo. She served as an associate producer on the 2005 independent animated film Hoodwinked, directed by Cory Edwards, Todd Edwards, and Tony Leech. The film, which was one of the first fully independently funded computer-animated films, received mixed reviews, and earned over $110 million worldwide. Along with her husband, she served as a producer on the 2010 independent film Jeffie Was Here, directed by Todd Edwards. Both her husband and her daughter Eva were diagnosed with Leukemia within the same year, however Eva was cured after two years of treatment.

== Filmography ==
Year	Title	Role	Notes
1999	Chillicothe	Judy	assistant production coordinator
2000	Dinosaur		special thanks
2000	The Emperor's New Groove		special thanks
2001	15 Minutes		production assistant
2001	Atlantis: The Lost Empire		post-production coordinator
2001	Spirited Away		post-production coordinator
2002	Lilo & Stitch		post-production coordinator
2002	Treasure Planet		special thanks
2003	Destino		assistant production manager
2004	Lorenzo		assistant production manager
2005	Hoodwinked!		associate producer
2007	Strictly Background		special thanks
2010	Jeffie Was Here	Nurse	producer
2011	Sold		special thanks
2012	Zambezia		US voice editorial support
