= Life's a Zoo =

- Opening and closing title card for Cuppa Coffee's Life's a Zoo.tv.
- Genre: Animated sitcom
- Created by: Andrew Horne
- Written by: Andrew Horne; Brandon Firla; Kurt Firla; Ron Sparks; Teresa Pavlinek; Ralph Chapman; Sarah Glinski; Graham Wagner
- Starring: Kurt Firla; Stephanie Jung; Stephen Kishewitsch; Joseph Motiki; Bridget Ogundipe; Mike Rowland; Francisco Trujillo; Michael Lamport; Stacey DePass
- Countries of origin: Canada; Australia
- No. of seasons: 2
- No. of episodes: 20

Production
- Executive producer: Adam Shaheen
- Producer: Morghan Fortier
- Running time: 22 minutes

Original release
- Network: TELETOON Detour (Canada); SBS/SBS One (Australia)
- Release: September 1, 2008 – November 8, 2009

Life's a Zoo is a Canadian-Australian adult-oriented stop motion-animated sitcom created by Adam Shaheen and Andrew Horne. It is directed by Alexander Gorelick. A co-production between Cuppa Coffee Studios, TELETOON Canada Inc. and SBS, "Life's a Zoo.tv" was named Best Animated Program or Series at the 24th Annual Gemini Awards. The Show targets adults ages 18 to 34. It premiered on September 1, 2008, on TELETOON's late night programming block, TELETOON Detour (now the Canadian version of Adult Swim). It premiered on Smosh's cartoon-themed YouTube channel, Shut Up! Cartoons on June 23, 2013.

== Premise ==
The adult-animated sitcom is a parody of the reality TV series Big Brother, with a similar plot. The seven very different contestants share a mansion "Somewhere in Saskatchewan..." where they compete in challenges to avoid being "extincted" (the adult-animated sitcom's version of elimination), supervised by the adult-animated sitcom's host, Claude the vulture in the first season, and later Bobbie the harp seal in the second season. In the first season, despite being eliminated, characters always come back, as Life's a Zoo.tv doesn't use continuity. However, starting in season two, characters are permanently eliminated. Additionally, each episode features a specially edited music video from a different indie artist from Canada. The show won Best Animated Series at the 24th Gemini Awards in 2009.

== Main characters ==
- Ray (Mike Rowland) - An immature orangutan who is the party-animal of the group; he acts completely on impulse and usually performs dangerous or reckless stunts. He is shown to be loud-mouthed and has bloodshot eyes from smoking marijuana, evidenced by the fact that he owns a bong. Ray claims that his parents went out partying a lot when he was a child, which made him very lonely. He loves watching adult cartoons and playing video games. Ray is also known to make outrageous bets, which he cannot pay off, although he becomes rich after betting on Jake to win in the finale. He was the fifth one eliminated in the second season. He used the money he won to rebuild the mansion after Jake blew it up, therefore feeling entitled to own it too.
- Jake Oswald (Kurt Firla) - A perverted and comic-alleged Canadian pig who constantly attempts schemes, believing himself to be a genius when it comes to reality show strategy. He joined Life's a Zoo by accidentally walking into the audition trailer thinking it was a sperm bank. He still lives with his mother, although she won't admit to raising him. Jake is egotistical and devious, and is often delusional about his own grandeur. He constantly lies to the audience about his sexual encounters and often makes up stories to make himself look good. Jake lusts after Minou, and usually spies on her when she is showering. He also believes that she lusts after him just as much, and that they will have sex before the season ends, despite her disgust with him. He was the first one to be eliminated in the first season. In the second season, because of Minou's early elimination he begins to lust after Bobbie instead. Jake made it to the finale in the second season as the runner-up, but won the house when Chi-Chi forfeited it. Unfortunately, he had rigged the house to explode when she won and couldn't prevent it from happening. He now works as Ray's servant in the rebuilt mansion.
- Morreski (Stephen Kishewitsch) - A vodka-addicted Russian brown bear that wears a fez. He is the oldest member of the cast at 62. He is heard talking about his homeland many times over the series, and mentioning his wife, who is presumably very manly for a woman. Morreski is also very protective of his mother, as shown in two instances when he swears and beats up Dr. D for insulting her. Even though he is very laid back and drunk, Morreski is the wisest and strongest of the cast. He has had many jobs over the years, and thus has a wide skill-set. In the second season, he was the third one eliminated, although he made a special appearance in the next episode as a wedding officiant.
- Dr. D (Joseph Motiki) - A rapping gentoo penguin who wears a cap, sunglasses and much jewelry and has a no-nonsense attitude. He usually gives his opinion without caring about the consequences. He has a strong taste for cigars as well as his hip hop music. Dr. D is also known to be violent, threatening Ray when he bets with him and doesn't get paid, and often brags about his life in the "hood." In the second season, it is revealed that he is actually a poser, his real name is Dewey Dewson, and he only pretended to be a gangster to further his rap career. He was the second one eliminated in the second season. After being found out he went back to being Dewson, but tends to slip into his Dr. D persona when angry.
- Rico (Francisco Trujillo) - A Colombian American crocodile . He is a fashion designer, as well as a gay stereotype. Rico is the most passionate of the group, and is the "bitchy one" when Minou's not around. It is revealed in the episode "Truth or Consequences" that the producers actually asked him to play up his homosexual lifestyle, including his Latino accent, since they wanted him to be more camp and he has since grown used to and embraced it as part of himself. When Rico was young, his father tricked him into believing it was okay for him to come out, an action which resulted in his father throwing a tantrum and beating him. His father is still disappointed in him, believing his homosexuality is a phase. Rico once "experimented" with being married to a woman; however, it didn't work out. He was the fourth one eliminated in both the first and second season.
- Minou (Bridget Ogundipe) - A Jamaica black panther with a different hairstyle every episode (revealed in the episode "Self Helpless" to actually be from a collection of wigs). Minou is greedy and snotty, believing everyone else is beneath her, but the men are attracted to her nonetheless. She suffers constant harassment from Jake, who spies on her while she showers. She is revealed to be bulimic, once commenting that it's a great way to keep her tummy flat, and that bulimia came from sex. Minou is extremely insecure about her appearance deep down, which comes out as anger. In the episode "Ray Against The Machine", it is revealed that Minou would have won the mansion before the original episode script was destroyed, despite the fact that she was eliminated in the episode "Live and Let Diet". She was the first one eliminated in the second season; she accidentally jumped out of a plane without a parachute in the first episode of season two, thinking the plane was fake. She showed up later in the episode in a body cast, only to be shoved and crash out the front door. Minou appeared in the season finale, still in the body cast, and later escaped the mansion with the other characters.
- Chi-Chi (Stephanie Jung) - A Chinese overweight panda who works as a fifth-grade elementary school teacher. Chi-Chi has an enormous appetite and is extremely gluttonous, eating everything and anything. She is goodhearted, but usually shunned by the others. Since she was two years old, her mother, now deceased, made her play an erhu all the time, saying it was better for her than being out and making friends. She was the second one eliminated in the first season, in the episode "It's Not Easy Being Chi"; however, she bought her way back in. Chi-Chi has a promiscuous side to her, and by the end of the series she has slept with most of the male cast except for Jake and Rico. In the second season, she made it all the way to the final episode before being drugged, comatose, and losing her memories. Bobbie made her watch the entirety of the first season to refresh her memory while the other disqualified characters voted on whether she or Jake should win the mansion. Chi-Chi won the house, but turned it down because she was ashamed and disgusted with what the show had made her into.
- Claude (Michael Lamport) - A vulture who was the host for season one. He often makes witty comments on the plot before and after every commercial break, as well as refereeing all the challenges. He is shown to be usually reading, or commenting on how he wants to get a better gig. While enthusiastic in the first few episodes, he soon despairs over the chaos the contestants cause. After Ray discovered the show was scripted, the contestants revolted and tied him up. It is most likely that he was tied up in the basement of the mansion for the entirety of the second season and was killed in the explosion.
- Bobbie (Stacey DePass) - The harp seal hostess of the second season, replacing Claude due to various circumstances. She is very mean-spirited to the houseguests, and is much tougher than Claude, and far more determined to find a winner for the show. In the episode "Truth or Consequences," it is revealed that she is in her fifties, has had plastic surgery, has been married and divorced several times, and, though Dr. D doesn't get to reveal it, may also be a male-to-female transgender. It is unknown if she escaped with the other characters or died in the explosion.

== Episodes ==
Title	Original air date	Synopsis	Music
"Welcome to the Jungle"	September 1, 2008 (Teletoon); June 23, 2013 (YouTube)	The cast is introduced to their new home and get to know one another for the next thirteen weeks. Jake is immediately alienated by the group when he's locked out of the house and he attempts to break back in.	"Made of Stone" by Spiral Beach
"You Snooze, You Lose It"	September 5, 2008 (Teletoon); July 14, 2013 (YouTube)	After succeeding in an event to stay awake longer than his house mates, Jake is awarded a papaya as a prize. As a result of sleep deprivation, Jake perceives the papaya as a trophy and locks himself in his room, leaving only to assert dominance over his opponents by playing pranks on them. Ray tricks Jake into thinking the papaya is alive by providing a voice for it and his obsession with it escalates to infatuation as a result, while the others hunt down Jake in retaliation.	"Young Leaves" by Attack in Black.
"Rayland"	September 8, 2008 (Teletoon); July 21, 2013 (YouTube)	Rico has been granted king of the mansion for the day and begins to go mad with power. Fed up with the social hierarchy of the house, Ray stages a coup and asserts himself as a dictatorial leader which leads to a revolution.	"Spinning in My Grave" by The Beautiful Unknown.
"It's Not Easy Being Chi"	September 19, 2008 (Teletoon); July 28, 2013 (YouTube)	Chi-Chi becomes a flash in the pan celebrity after winning immunity. Her house mates attempt to leech off of her fame. She and Ray make a pornographic film, Rico becomes her business manager, Dr. D becomes her bodyguard, Minou becomes her wardrobe advisor, and Jake sells items she has touched online. However the fame begins to go to her head and she soon spirals out of control.	"Mr. Therapy Man" by Justin Nozuka.
"Live and Let Diet"	September 26, 2008 (Teletoon); July 7, 2013 (YouTube)	Following a week of binge eating, the cast is forced into a weight loss competition. Minou develops a binge eating disorder and Jake becomes hideously disfigured after having Ray and Morreski perform lipo suction on him. He wins the competition as a consequence, and Minou is extincted for actually gaining weight.	"The Skinny" by The Tin Bangs.
"Dr. D Plays House"	October 3, 2008 (Teletoon); August 7, 2013 (YouTube)	The cast engages in a musical competition. Dr. D thinks he has it locked up and turns down a lucrative offer from a record label outside the mansion, only to be smacked down in a rap battle by Chi-Chi.	"Won More Time" by God Made Me Funky.
"Teddy Bear's Picnic"	October 10, 2008 (Teletoon); August 11, 2013 (YouTube)	After Morreski earns a coupon for a free picnic, the cast's refrigerator becomes mysteriously sealed, forcing them to fight for Morreski's prize. The rightful owner of the coupon is finally decided with a To Tell the Truth style game show; "Morreski or No Morreski".	"Show Me" by Ripped.
"Big Brother, Where Art Thou"	October 17, 2008 (Teletoon); August 18, 2013 (YouTube)	After being discreetly drugged, the cast members wake to find themselves isolated in a large, white maze. As they attempt to find an exit, Chi-Chi, who has been left in the mansion, assumes that her competitors have been extincted and insinuates herself as the victor.	"Midnight Love" by Jason Kent.
"Scared Shirtless"	October 24, 2008 (Teletoon); June 30, 2013 (YouTube)	The cast members struggle to stay alive while being pursued by a psychopathic killer, as well as find his fortune somewhere in the house.	"First Date" by Danko Jones.
"Self Helpless"	October 31, 2008 (Teletoon); August 25, 2013 (YouTube)	The cast is abruptly deprived of their various addictive vices and forced to cope without, at the risk of being extincted. Ray, deprived of video games, watches TV instead and converts to Christianity after obsessively watching a televangelist. Jake assumes ownership of his housemates' addicting items (while still abstaining from his own) and eventually hospitalized himself (momentarily causing the other contestants to believe he was dead), as a result of overindulgence.	"How Did You Get This Way?" by Trophy Band.
"Acts of Random Niceness"	November 7, 2008 (Teletoon); September 1, 2013 (YouTube)	The entire cast attempts to refrain from directing anger at one another, with the winner being promised their weight in gold. Rico fattens himself up to warrant a larger prize (causing Morreski to come onto him, thinking that he is a woman after he starts to wear a mumu dress) and Jake takes advantage of the terms of the challenge by making repeated romantic passes on Minou, without the fear of any legitimate consequences.	"Roller Coaster" by Major Maker.
"2D or not 2D"	November 14, 2008 (Teletoon); September 8, 2013 (YouTube)	Claude spends most of the show's budget on a flashy ad campaign, resulting in the show having to cut budgets, including redesigning it to a cheaper 2D format. Ray enjoys how he can hurt himself all he wants, Minou erases some of her torso to slim down, and Chi Chi gorges herself on living food. Then reverted to a real one, and Claude announces its DIY campaign for mansion renovation after a controversial 2D animated format for children.	"Sinners of St. Avenue" by Slave to the Square Wave.
"Ray Against the Machine"	November 21, 2008 (Teletoon); September 15, 2013 (YouTube)	During the season one finale, after discovering a secret surveillance room in the mansion, Ray uncovers a collection of scripts and storyboards, suggesting that the show is, in fact, scripted. The cast then plans an elaborate retaliation plot, only to fight over how each of them want to end the show. This is the only episode without a featured music video.	N/A
"Unplugged And Rewired"	September 23, 2013	After discovering the show has been faked all along, the former cast take control and try to create their own show!	"Blue Flame" by Run With Kittens
"The Breakfree Club"	September 29, 2013	In the season two debut, the seven contestants are aboard on the same plane they were on in first episode along with a new host, a harp seal named Bobbie, who is determined to turn the show around. Fed up, Minou quits and accidentally jumps without a parachute; only to discover too late that it was real. Bobbie returns the six to the mansion, where she hypnotizes all but Ray into being perfect reality show contestants. After Ray finds Minou in a wheelchair and body cast, he frees everyone, only for Minou be the first eliminated when she rolls and crashed out through the front door.	"Don't Let Go" by Crowned King.
"Truth Or Consequences"	October 6, 2013	Bobbie forces the contestants to reveal their darkest secrets. Everyone finds out Rico's accent was exaggerated for the show, and Jake got on after he wandered into the casting trailer thinking it was a sperm bank. Dr. D uncovers some secrets about Bobbie and tries to expose her, however he is eliminated after it is revealed he is really a poser named Dewey Dewson.	"Chasing Satellites" by Hello Operator.
"Chi's Having A Baby"	October 13, 2013	The contestants' parenting skills are put to the test when they are tasked to take care of an egg for one day. However, things quickly take a turn when Chi-Chi discovers she may actually be pregnant! Morreski is eliminated for not only breaking his egg, but multiple eggs he got from a chicken.	"Fashionable People" by Joel Plaskett.
"Holy Matrimony"	October 20, 2013	After being handcuffed to each other all morning, the final four must face their toughest challenge yet: deciding which two of them will get married! As Jake and Ray try to get Chi-Chi to take their hand, Rico tries to convince them to take his instead. He is eliminated after Chi-Chi accidentally crushes him, leaving Jake, Ray, and Chi-Chi as the final three contestants.	"From Me To You" by Vanderpark
"Chubby Chasers"	October 27, 2013	Jake and Ray form an alliance to go to the finale two. However Chi-Chi wins immunity, leading the two to fight for her affection so she will choose them to go to the finale, which culminates in accidentally drugging her.	"Goin' Down" by The Illuminati
"The Finale Finale"	November 3, 2013	After waking up Chi-Chi, Jake and Ray discover that she has amnesia and cannot remember anything. Bobbie sends her to her room to marathon the entire first season of the show. Jake beats Ray in a rock-paper-scissors tiebreaker, eliminating Ray and placing Jake in the final two. Meanwhile, Bobbie brings back the eliminated players to vote for the winner. Chi-Chi wins by a unanimous vote, but she rejects the prize after seeing how horrible the controversial show has made her and leaves to find herself. A distraught Jake revolts the mansion to explode, but is unable to stop the fuse after he is declared the winner, and the mansion is destroyed. Since Ray bet on Jake to win, he becomes rich, rebuilds the house, and hires Jake as his servant	"Leave a Light" by Krista Muir.

== Streaming ==
The rights to the series were bought by Smosh to be aired on their Shut Up! Cartoons YouTube channel. Most of the show remains the same with the exception of the inclusion of Shut Up! Cartoons intros and outros and notably more censorship of profanity, drug references, and sexual content.

Eventually, the streaming rights were acquired by Lionsgate Studios and are available to watch for free on YouTube uncensored. The series is also available on Tubi and Peacock.

== Planned spin-off ==
There were plans for a child-friendly spin-off called Pen Pals. The series would have feature Jake and Ray as the main characters. The project has been since been scrapped as references to it were removed from the official Cuppa Coffee Studios website.
