= Samurai! Daycare =

American animated web series

- Genre: Animated sitcom
- Created by: Mike Blum
- Directed by: Mike Blum
- Voices of: Matthew Lillard; Cathy Shim
- Composer: Jacob Voffee
- Country of origin: United States
- Original language: English
- No. of episodes: 10

Production
- Executive producers: Anthony Padilla; Ian Hecox; Barry Blumberg
- Producer: Mike Blum
- Editor: Joe Gressis
- Running time: 3–4 minutes
- Production company: Pipsqueak Films

Original release
- Network: Shut Up! Cartoons
- Release: August 9 – October 12, 2012

Samurai! Daycare is an American animated web series created by Mike Blum and produced by Pipsqueak Films.

== Premise ==
Samurai! Daycare follow Ned as he "teaches" a bunch of preschoolers, while simultaneously "rooting out evil" in his misguided, yet well intended manner

== Episodes ==
No.	Title	Written by	Original release date
1	"Crappy Decision"	Mike Blum	August 9, 2012
2	"Drunken Master"	James Waugh	August 17, 2012
3	"Jess's Guy"	Joelle Sellner	August 24, 2012
4	"To Catch a Theif"	Mike Blum	August 31, 2012
5	"Easy A"	Kevin M. Brennan & Doug Manley	September 7, 2012
6	"Seppuku"	James Waugh	September 14, 2012
7	"Gory Time"	Tom Campana	September 21, 2012
8	"Noodles and Honor"	Joelle Sellner	September 28, 2012
9	"Blood Feud"	Kevin M. Brennan & Doug Manley	October 5, 2012
10	"Senior Citizen MMA"	Mike Blum & James Waugh	October 12, 2012
