= Cory Edwards =

American filmmaker and comedian (born 1968)

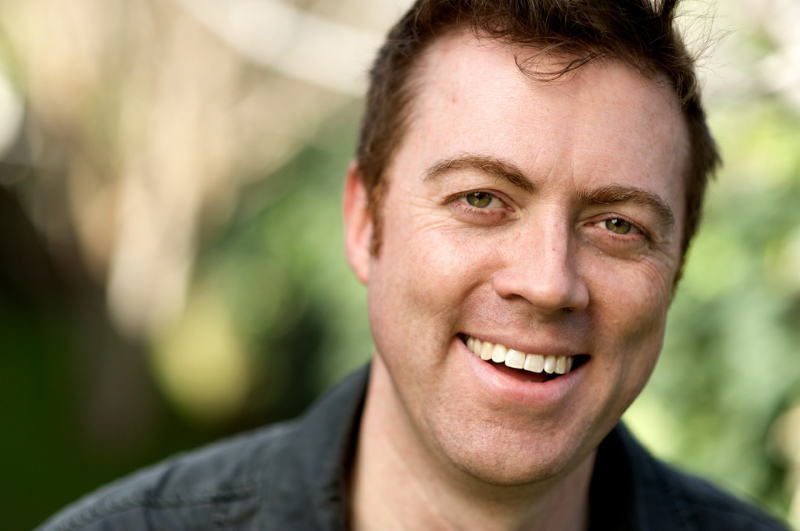
- Born: August 21, 1968 (age 58); Anderson, Indiana, U.S.
- Education: Anderson University
- Occupations: Film director, screenwriter, actor, stand-up comedian
- Spouse: Vicki Edwards
- Children: 2

Cory Edwards (born August 21, 1968) is an American film director, screenwriter, and stand-up comedian. He is best known for directing, co-writing, and voice acting in Hoodwinked (2005), and for co-writing and voice acting in the 2011 sequel Hoodwinked Too! Hood vs. Evil. He is the older brother of screenwriter/director Todd Edwards and film producer Katie Hooten.

== Parents ==
James L. Edwards, Cory Edwards' father, grew up as the son of a minister in Kettering, Ohio, and graduated from Anderson University with a Bachelor of Arts in 1965. Throughout college, James worked at a J.C. Penney, held various jobs on campus, and served as a minister of music in a small church. Upon graduation, he took on a job as the university's Director of Student Recruitment, which he held until earning a Master of Divinity from Anderson School of Theology in 1970.

Deanna Monteith, Cory Edwards' mother, grew up in Springfield, Ohio, where she worked in a law office while attending classes part-time at Wittenberg University. She enrolled in Anderson University during the same semester as James, and they married in 1964 after their junior year. Deanna continued her studies by following a degree in elementary education with a master's degree from Ball State University. She and James then moved to Grand Rapids, Michigan, where James served as a pastor at Pasadena Park Church of God. Cory's younger brother Todd was born there in 1971.

A year later, the family returned to Anderson and James resumed work at the university. He directed church and alumni relations until 1975, at which point they all moved to Columbus Ohio. James served as a senior pastor of Meadow Park Church of God for the next fifteen years and also studied at Ohio State University, where in 1987 he received a PhD. in Educational Policy and Leadership.

Deanna worked as a teacher in both public and private schools. In addition to his work as a pastor and at Anderson University, James also held the positions of president and CEO at Warner Press, the publishing house for the Church of God. James and Deanna have known gospel music singers Bill and Gloria Gaither since early on in their music career. The Gaithers' son Benjy was a childhood friend of Cory and his siblings and often collaborated with them on their films.

In 1990, his father was elected president of Anderson University. Upon moving back to Anderson, Deanna assumed the position of Children's Program Director at Alternatives Inc., an organization that works with women and children in domestic crises. Although she no longer holds this position at the organization, she is currently a member of the board.

== Early life ==
Cory Edwards was born on August 21, 1968, in Anderson, Indiana, to James L. Edwards and Deanna Monteith.

Cory, Todd, and their younger sister Katie showed an interest in the arts from an early age. They would put on puppet shows and plays and used a tape recorder to create their own radio shows. Cory was around seven or eight years old when they first started experimenting with their family's Super 8 video camera. Their first film, succinctly titled Movie Stuff, did not have a plot and was simply a chance for them to learn how to use the camera and try out special effects.

As they continued, they made films in several different genres, including a superhero film called Captain Lightning that was directed by Cory, a Laurel and Hardy type comedy called Crime Doesn't Pay that was directed by Todd, and an action-adventure film that centered on a character named Jack Francisco. As they grew older, their films became more elaborate, often taking them months to complete. Starting with storyboarding the shots, they would go on to create their own sets, miniatures, and costumes. Neighborhood kids joined in as extras, and sound and special effects were added after filming. In school, Cory usually turned in films for class projects and occasionally won national competitions with them.

While attending Anderson University, Cory and Todd served as directors for the on-campus comedy show Cheap Thrills. Cory interned at an animation studio in Ohio during his summers and graduated in 1990 with a major in Broadcasting and a minor in Art.

== Career ==
In the early 1990s, he hosted a Christian music video show, Signal Exchange, on INSP network. Cory Edwards acted in his brother Todd's 1999 film Chillicothe. Private investor Maurice Kanbar enjoyed the film and eventually offered to finance them to make an animated fairy tale told in a contemporary style.

He directed a 2003 direct-to-video Christian short film A Wobots Christmas.

Cory, Todd, and their friend Tony Leech decided to make a film of Little Red Riding Hood told in the context of a police investigation. However, once their film was finished, Maurice Kanbar was not in the financial position to distribute it, so he took it to the newly formed Weinstein Company, which agreed to buy the film.

The film, titled Hoodwinked!, was released in late 2005 in order to be eligible for award consideration and then received a wider release in January 2006. Hoodwinked! received mixed reviews but made a worldwide total of $110,011,106, making it a success due to its small budget.

Edwards co-wrote Hoodwinked Too: Hood vs. Evil alongside his Hoodwinked! co-creators and co-writers Tony Leech and Todd Edwards.

Despite Hoodwinked's mediocre reviews, many people at the Jim Henson Company enjoyed the film. They started to talk with Cory about the possibility of him rewriting the script for the sequel to The Dark Crystal, however instead they agreed that he would write and direct a feature-length version of Fraggle Rock.

Edwards is the co-writer of Escape from Planet Earth, an animated alien adventure directed by Tony Leech produced by Brian Inerfeld, Jon Shestack, Ed Jones, Preston Stutzman and Greg Little and released by The Weinstein Company in February 2013.

Edwards has co-written several episodes of the hit Christian children's series VeggieTales (as well as its reboot, The VeggieTales Show) since 2013, including "The Little House That Stood", "Merry Larry and the True Light of Christmas", "Veggies in Space: The Fennel Frontier", "Beauty and the Beet", and "Noah's Ark".

Edwards created the webseries Roger Cosmonkey, which has been described as the world's first episodic Twitter series. Edwards developed the idea shortly after his deal to write and direct a feature film of the television series Fraggle Rock expired. He found the process of creating the series for Twitter to be liberating since it gave him complete creative control.

He is also the creator and star of the internet cartoon series Krogzilla on Shut Up! Cartoons.

When asked by a fan of Hoodwinked! whether he'd like to pitch a project to Angel Studios, Edwards commented that he was very interested, although he noted that it wouldn't be easy because of the complex process behind the studio's project approving. However, Edwards also confirmed that he collaborated with the company by performing stand-up in a Dry Bar Comedy special, and that he's currently writing for the animated television adaption of The Wingfeather Saga.

== Personal life ==
Cory Edwards is a Christian and attends Bel Air Presbyterian Church, where he is a member of their drama department.
