= Tony Leech =

American filmmaker (born 1968)

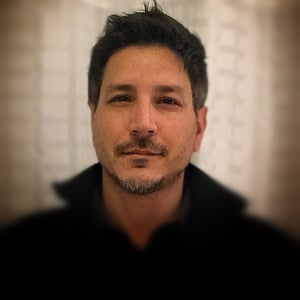
- Born: May 28, 1968 (age 57); Southfield, Michigan, U.S
- Occupation: Filmmaker
- Years active: 1990–present

Tony Leech (born May 28, 1968) is an American filmmaker. He attended Oral Roberts University in Tulsa, Oklahoma. While a student there, Leech and fellow ORU student Mark Steele, along with some friends, wrote and performed a sketch comedy show called Standing Room Only, or SRO. Leech acted, wrote, directed, and edited for the Fire By Nite Christian variety show that was based at Willie George Ministries in Tulsa. He also worked on projects with Teen Mania Ministries, then based in Tulsa and headed by ORU-alumnus Ron Luce.

Tony acted in the 1990 music video/short film Beyond Belief by the Christian rock band Petra. He was a writer for the Christian variety show Carman: Time 2 hosted by singer Carman (singer). In 1999, Leech acted in 3 feature films, Pit of Vipers, Holy Hollywood (along with Mickey Rooney and Camille Keaton) and Chillicothe, a Todd Edwards film on which he also served as first assistant director.

Leech later served as co-writer, co-director, and editor of the 2005 animated feature film Hoodwinked!, in conjunction with friends Cory Edwards and Todd Edwards. The film was released by The Weinstein Company. In 2006, he created and sold the animated project Escape from Planet Earth — a story about a group of aliens from around the universe who attempt a prison break from Area 51 — to The Weinstein Company. He then collaborated with the Edwards brothers again to write Hoodwinked Too! Hood vs. Evil, the 2011 sequel to Hoodwinked!.

Leech has also written, directed and edited a number of short films, including "Squared," selected as Horror Short of the Week by Blumhouse, "Gene," an official selection of the 2010 Woodstock Film Festival, and "Exit Interview," winner of Chapter 7 for Canon & Vimeo's "The Story Beyond the Still" contest. Several of Leech's short films can be seen on Vimeo.
