= List of The Weinstein Company films =

The following is the complete list of films produced and distributed by the American film studio The Weinstein Company. The company was founded by Bob and Harvey Weinstein in 2005. The company's first release in 2005 was the crime thriller film Derailed (starring Jennifer Aniston, Vincent Cassel, and Clive Owen). In March 2018, the company declared bankruptcy. In July 2018, the rights to its films were acquired by Lantern Entertainment. In 2019, Spyglass Media Group acquired the catalogue of Lantern Entertainment. In 2021, Lionsgate acquired a nearly 20% stake in Spyglass in addition to the bulk of TWC's library, indicated by an asterisk (*).

== 2000s ==
| Release date | Title | Notes |
|---|---|---|
| November 11, 2005 | Derailed* | first release; North American distribution only, Miramax Films held international distribution |
| November 25, 2005 | The Libertine | North American distribution only (Note: Currently owned by Shout! Studios.) |
| December 23, 2005 | Transamerica* | North American co-distribution with IFC Films only |
| December 25, 2005 | Mrs Henderson Presents* | North American distribution only |
| December 30, 2005 | The Matador* | co-distribution with Miramax Films |
| January 13, 2006 | Hoodwinked!* (Note: Currently owned by Content Partners, LLC, with North American distribution rights licensed to Sony Pictures and international rights retained by Lionsgate) | The studio's first animated film, distribution only, produced by Kanbar Entertainment and Blue Yonder Films |
| February 24, 2006 | Doogal* | The studio's second animated film, North and South American distribution only |
| April 7, 2006 | Lucky Number Slevin* | U.S. and select international distribution only; distributed in North America by Metro-Goldwyn-Mayer |
| April 14, 2006 | The Great Music Caper* | |
| May 18, 2006 | The Blue Elephant* | co-production with Kantana Animation, Kantana Group Public Co., and Sahamongkol Film International |
| June 23, 2006 | Wordplay* | distribution only; co-distributed by IFC Films in North America |
| July 7, 2006 | The Reef* | co-production with WonderWorld Studios, DigiArt, and FXDigital |
| July 21, 2006 | Clerks II* | distributed by Metro-Goldwyn-Mayer, co-production with View Askew Productions |
| September 8, 2006 | The Protector* | distribution in the U.S., Australia, New Zealand, Scandinavia and South Africa only |
| October 6, 2006 | Alex Rider: Operation Stormbreaker* | distributed by Metro-Goldwyn-Mayer |
| November 10, 2006 | Shut Up & Sing* | distribution only |
| November 17, 2006 | Bobby (Note: Owned by Bold Films, with U.S. distribution rights licensed to Vertical) | North American co-distribution with Metro-Goldwyn-Mayer only |
| December 15, 2006 | Days of Glory | North American co-distribution with IFC Films only |
| December 28, 2006 | Wolfhound* | distribution in North America, the U.K., Ireland, Australia, New Zealand and English-speaking South Africa only |
| December 29, 2006 | Factory Girl* | distribution in North America, the U.K., Ireland, Australia, New Zealand and South Africa only; distributed in North America by Metro-Goldwyn-Mayer |
| December 29, 2006 | Miss Potter* | North American distribution only; distributed by Metro-Goldwyn-Mayer |
| January 12, 2007 | Arthur and the Invisibles* | distribution in North America, the U.K., Ireland, Australia, New Zealand and South Africa only; produced by EuropaCorp; distributed by Metro-Goldwyn-Mayer in the U.S. (Note: Rights held by Lionsgate, but currently out-of-commerce due to the re-release of EuropaCorp's original English version.) |
| January 17, 2007 | Alone with Her* | |
| February 9, 2007 | Breaking and Entering* | distribution in North America only; produced by Miramax Films and Mirage Enterprises; distributed by Metro-Goldwyn-Mayer in the U.S. |
| February 9, 2007 | Hannibal Rising* | North American co-distribution with Metro-Goldwyn-Mayer only; produced by DDLC Dino De Laurentiis Company |
| March 16, 2007 | Nomad* | distribution in North America, the U.K., Ireland, Australia, New Zealand and South Africa only |
| March 23, 2007 | TMNT* | international distribution outside the U.K., Ireland, Benelux, France, Spain, Italy, China and Japan only; produced by Imagi Animation Studios; distribution in North America by Warner Bros. Pictures |
| April 27, 2007 | Snow Cake* | U.S. co-distribution with IFC First Take only |
| May 11, 2007 | The Ex* | distributed by Metro-Goldwyn-Mayer |
| May 18, 2007 | Brooklyn Rules | produced by City Lights Productions, Eagle Beach Productions, Straight Up Films, Southpaw Entertainment and Cataland Films (Note: Currently owned by Gravitas Ventures) |
| June 22, 2007 | Sicko* | co-distributed with Lionsgate Films |
| June 22, 2007 | Black Sheep* | North American co-distribution with IFC Films only |
| July 10, 2007 | Thunderpants* | US distribution only; produced by Pathé Pictures and Sky Movies |
| August 14, 2007 | The Last Legion* | North American distribution only |
| August 24, 2007 | Dedication* | co-distribution with First Look Studios only |
| August 24, 2007 | The Nanny Diaries* | distributed by Metro-Goldwyn-Mayer; co-production with FilmColony |
| September 5, 2007 | I Want Someone to Eat Cheese With* | co-distribution with IFC Films only |
| September 14, 2007 | The Hunting Party* | North American, Australian and New Zealand distribution only; distributed by Metro-Goldwyn-Mayer in the U.S. |
| September 14, 2007 | Pete Seeger: The Power of Song* | |
| October 10, 2007 | Control* | North American distribution only |
| October 18, 2007 | Trick or Treaters* | produced by Animation X Gesellschaft zur Produktion von Animationsfilmen mbH |
| October 19, 2007 | Out of the Blue | North American co-distribution with IFC First Take only |
| November 21, 2007 | I'm Not There* | North American, U.K. and Irish distribution only |
| November 30, 2007 | Awake* | distributed by Metro-Goldwyn-Mayer |
| December 7, 2007 | Grace Is Gone* | distribution only |
| December 25, 2007 | The Great Debaters* | distributed by Metro-Goldwyn-Mayer; co-production with Harpo Films |
| January 18, 2008 | Cassandra's Dream* | U.S., Australian and New Zealand distribution only; produced by Wild Bunch and Virtual Studios |
| January 25, 2008 | Rambo* | U.S. co-distribution with Lionsgate Films only |
| February 22, 2008 | Diary of the Dead* | North American and Mexican distribution only |
| March 4, 2008 | 3 Pigs and a Baby* | produced by Prana Studios |
| March 19, 2008 | La Misma Luna* | co-distributed with Fox Searchlight Pictures; produced by Creando Films, Fidecine and Potomac Pictures |
| March 21, 2008 | The Hammer* | U.S. distribution only |
| March 21, 2008 | The Orphanage* | U.K., Irish, Australian, New Zealand and Italian distribution only; produced by Rodar y Rodar and Telecinco Cinema |
| April 4, 2008 | My Blueberry Nights* | U.S., Australian and New Zealand distribution only |
| April 10, 2008 | The Band's Visit | Eastern European, Chinese and Hong Kong distribution only |
| April 18, 2008 | The Forbidden Kingdom* | distribution in North and Latin America, the U.K., Ireland, France and Spain only; co-distributed by Lionsgate Films in North America, the U.K. and Ireland |
| April 18, 2008 | Where in the World Is Osama bin Laden?* | North American distribution only |
| July 11, 2008 | Death Defying Acts* | distribution in the U.S., Argentina, Chile, China, Hong Kong, Thailand and select other territories only |
| July 23, 2008 | Boy A* | distribution outside U.K. television only; produced by Cuba Pictures for Channel 4 |
| August 15, 2008 | Vicky Cristina Barcelona* | North American co-distribution with Metro-Goldwyn-Mayer only; produced by Mediapro and Wild Bunch |
| August 21, 2008 | Persepolis* | Australian and New Zealand distribution with Roadshow Films only; produced by 2.4.7 Films, Celluloid Dreams, CNC, France 3 Cinéma, The Kennedy/Marshall Company, Franche Connection Animations, Diaphana Distribution, Sony Pictures Classics, Soficinéma and Sofica EuropaCorp |
| September 9, 2008 | Tortoise vs. Hare* | produced by Prana Studios |
| September 9, 2008 | The Nutty Professor* | produced by Mainframe Entertainment Inc. |
| September 19, 2008 | Elite Squad* | distribution outside Latin America only; co-distributed with IFC Films in the U.S. |
| September 19, 2008 | Igor* | International distributor; North American distribution by Metro-Goldwyn-Mayer |
| October 31, 2008 | Zack and Miri Make a Porno* | co-produced by View Askew Productions |
| October 31, 2008 | The Flight Before Christmas* | distribution in North and Latin America, the U.K., Ireland, Australia, New Zealand and South Africa only; produced by Anima Vitae, A. Film A/S, Pictorion Magma Animation, and Magma Films |
| December 11, 2008 | Roman Polanski: Wanted and Desired* | international distribution outside U.K. television only |
| December 16, 2008 | The Goldilocks and the 3 Bears Show* | produced by Prana Studios |
| January 23, 2009 | Outlander* | U.S. distribution only |
| January 23, 2009 | Killshot* | |
| January 30, 2009 | The Reader* | co-production with Mirage Enterprises; Nominated for the Academy Award for Best Picture |
| February 6, 2009 | Fanboys* | |
| February 27, 2009 | Crossing Over* | |
| August 21, 2009 | Inglourious Basterds* | US theatrical and television and Canadian distribution only; co-production with Universal Pictures and A Band Apart. Nominated for the Academy Award for Best Picture |
| October 2, 2009 | Capitalism: A Love Story* | studio credit only, distributed in North America by Overture Films and internationally by Paramount Vantage |
| November 5, 2009 | The Burning Plain | Latin American co-distribution with Costantini Films only |
| December 11, 2009 | A Single Man* | U.S., German and Austrian distribution only |
| December 25, 2009 | Nine* | co-production with Relativity Media and Lucamar Productions |

== 2010s ==
| Release date | Title | Notes |
|---|---|---|
| July 30, 2010 | Le Concert* | U.S. distribution only |
| August 20, 2010 | The Tillman Story* | distribution in North America, the U.K., Ireland, Australia and New Zealand only |
| October 8, 2010 | Nowhere Boy* | North and Latin American, German and Austrian distribution only; produced by Film4 and UK Film Council |
| November 24, 2010 | Santa's Apprentice* | North American, U.K. and Irish distribution only; produced by Gaumont Alphanim and Flying Bark Productions |
| December 3, 2010 | All Good Things* | international distribution only |
| December 10, 2010 | The Fighter* | select international distribution including France, Germany, Austria, Spain and Korea only; distributed in North America by Paramount Pictures |
| December 11, 2010 | Little Gobie* | |
| December 22, 2010 | Chatroom* | international distribution only |
| December 24, 2010 | The King's Speech* | distribution in North and Latin America, Germany, Austria, France, China, Hong Kong, the Benelux and Scandinavia only Winner of the Academy Award for Best Picture |
| December 31, 2010 | Blue Valentine* | distribution in North America, the U.K., Ireland, France and pan-Asian television only |
| January 21, 2011 | The Company Men* | North American distribution only |
| March 25, 2011 | Miral* | North American distribution only; co-production with Rotana Film Production, Pathé |
| April 29, 2011 | Hoodwinked Too! Hood vs. Evil* | co-produced with Kanbar Entertainment |
| June 3, 2011 | Submarine* | North American distribution only, produced by Film4, UK Film Council and Red Hour Productions |
| July 22, 2011 | Sarah's Key* | U.S. distribution only |
| August 26, 2011 | Our Idiot Brother* | distribution in North America, the U.K., Ireland, Germany, Austria, France and Japan only |
| September 16, 2011 | I Don't Know How She Does It* | |
| October 7, 2011 | Dirty Girl* | distribution in the North America, the U.K., Ireland, Australia, New Zealand, South Africa and France only |
| November 25, 2011 | My Week with Marilyn* | co-production with BBC Films |
| November 25, 2011 | The Artist* | distribution in North and Latin America, the U.K., Ireland, Australia, New Zealand, South Africa and Eastern Europe; Winner of the Academy Award for Best Picture |
| December 30, 2011 | The Iron Lady* | North American distribution only |
| January 20, 2012 | Coriolanus* | U.S. and pan-Asian pay television distribution only |
| February 3, 2012 | W.E.* | U.S. distribution only |
| February 17, 2012 | Undefeated* | North American distribution only Winner of the Academy Award for Best Documentary Feature |
| March 30, 2012 | Bully* | distribution only |
| May 25, 2012 | The Intouchables* | distribution in North America, the U.K., Ireland, Australia, New Zealand, South Africa, Scandinavia, China and pan-Asian satellite television only |
| July 11, 2012 | Easy Money* | distribution in the U.S., Italy, Germany and Austria (excluding free television) and pan-Asian satellite television only |
| August 31, 2012 | Lawless* | produced by Annapurna Pictures |
| September 14, 2012 | The Master* | produced by Annapurna Pictures |
| October 30, 2012 | The Reef 2: High Tide* | produced by WonderWorld Studios |
| November 2, 2012 | This Must Be the Place* | North American distribution only |
| November 16, 2012 | Silver Linings Playbook* | Nominated for the Academy Award for Best Picture |
| November 30, 2012 | Killing Them Softly* | North American distribution only; produced by Plan B Entertainment, Annapurna Pictures and Chockstone Pictures |
| December 25, 2012 | Django Unchained* | North American distribution only; co-production with Columbia Pictures and A Band Apart; Nominated for the Academy Award for Best Picture |
| February 15, 2013 | Escape from Planet Earth* | As Kaleidoscope TWC; co-production with Rainmaker Entertainment |
| March 1, 2013 | Quartet* | U.S. and Latin American distribution only |
| March 22, 2013 | The Sapphires* | distribution outside the U.K., Ireland, Australia, New Zealand, France, Canada, Israel, Portugal and worldwide airlines only |
| April 26, 2013 | Kon-Tiki* | North American, U.K., Irish and Italian distribution only Nominated for the Academy Award for Best Foreign Language Film |
| July 12, 2013 | Fruitvale Station* | distribution only |
| July 18, 2013 | Leo the Lion* | produced by Dujass Film, distribution only |
| August 16, 2013 | The Butler* | North American distribution only |
| August 23, 2013 | The Grandmaster* | distribution in the U.S., English-speaking Canada, the U.K., Ireland, Australia and New Zealand only, produced by Annapurna Pictures |
| September 6, 2013 | Populaire | U.S., U.K., Irish, Australian and New Zealand distribution only |
| September 6, 2013 | Salinger* | distribution outside U.S. television only |
| September 20, 2013 | Haute Cuisine | distribution in the U.S., U.K., Ireland, South Africa and Asia excluding Japan only |
| November 1, 2013 | Saving Santa* | produced by Gateway Films and Prana Studios |
| November 20, 2013 | The Magic Snowflake* | North American, U.K. and Irish distribution only; produced by Gaumont Animation, Snipple Animation, and Dapaco Productions |
| November 22, 2013 | Philomena* | North American and Spanish distribution only, produced by Pathé and BBC Films; Nominated for the Academy Award for Best Picture |
| November 29, 2013 | Mandela: Long Walk to Freedom* | North American, Australian and New Zealand distribution only; produced by Pathé |
| December 27, 2013 | August: Osage County* | produced by Smokehouse Pictures |
| January 17, 2014 | The Nut Job* | international distribution outside Israel, Russia and Korea only; North American distribution by Open Road Films |
| February 7, 2014 | Vampire Academy* | U.S. distribution only; produced by Reliance Entertainment |
| April 4, 2014 | On the Other Side of the Tracks* | North and Latin American and Chinese distribution only |
| April 11, 2014 | The Railway Man* | North American distribution only |
| May 16, 2014 | The Immigrant* | U.S. distribution only; produced by Worldview Entertainment |
| June 12, 2014 | Hateship, Loveship* | international distribution only |
| June 27, 2014 | Begin Again* | North American distribution only; produced by Apatow Productions |
| August 15, 2014 | The Giver* | produced with Walden Media |
| August 28, 2014 | Kite* | international distribution outside South Africa only |
| September 12, 2014 | The Disappearance of Eleanor Rigby* | North American distribution only |
| September 19, 2014 | Tracks* | U.S. distribution only |
| October 10, 2014 | One Chance* | |
| October 24, 2014 | St. Vincent* | produced by Chernin Entertainment |
| November 21, 2014 | The Imitation Game* | U.S. distribution only; produced by Black Bear Pictures nominated for the Academy Award for Best Picture |
| December 25, 2014 | Big Eyes* | |
| January 16, 2015 | Paddington* | as TWC-Dimension; North American distribution only; produced by StudioCanal and Heyday Films |
| March 13, 2015 | Eva* | distribution in English-speaking territories only |
| April 1, 2015 | Woman in Gold* | produced by BBC Films and Origin Pictures |
| July 24, 2015 | Southpaw* | |
| July 30, 2015 | Suite Française | distribution in the U.S., Latin America, Germany, Austria, Russia, Australia and New Zealand only; released in the U.S. on Lifetime on May 22, 2017 |
| July 31, 2015 | The Young and Prodigious T.S. Spivet* | U.S. distribution only |
| August 26, 2015 | No Escape* | North American distribution only |
| October 30, 2015 | Burnt* | |
| November 20, 2015 | Carol* | North American distribution only; produced by Film4 |
| December 4, 2015 | Macbeth* | North American distribution only; produced by StudioCanal and Film4 |
| December 25, 2015 | The Hateful Eight* | |
| January 29, 2016 | Jane Got a Gun | U.S. distribution only |
| February 5, 2016 | Regression* | U.S. distribution only |
| February 26, 2016 | Crouching Tiger, Hidden Dragon: Sword of Destiny | Co-distributed by Netflix |
| April 15, 2016 | Sing Street* | U.S. distribution only |
| June 15, 2016 | Underdogs* | North American, Australian, New Zealand and French distribution only |
| August 26, 2016 | Hands of Stone* | |
| September 16, 2016 | Wild Oats* | U.S. distribution only |
| November 25, 2016 | Lion* | distribution outside Australia and New Zealand only Nominated for the Academy Award for Best Picture |
| January 20, 2017 | The Founder* | U.S. distribution only; co-production with FilmNation Entertainment and The Combine |
| January 27, 2017 | Gold* | as TWC-Dimension |
| May 5, 2017 | 3 Generations* | |
| June 7, 2017 | The Man with the Iron Heart (Note: Owned by Spyglass Media Group, with distribution rights licensed to Paramount Pictures) | U.S. distribution only |
| August 4, 2017 | Wind River* | North American theatrical distribution only |
| August 11, 2017 | The Nut Job 2: Nutty by Nature* | international distribution outside Korea, Hong Kong, Macau, Taiwan and China only; co-production with Red Rover International, ToonBox Entertainment and Shanghai Hoongman |
| August 25, 2017 | Leap!* | U.S. distribution under the Mizchief label only; produced by Quad Productions |
| September 1, 2017 | Tulip Fever* | co-production with Paramount Pictures, Worldview Entertainment and Ruby Films; the last film to be fully distributed by the company |
| September 1, 2017 | The Guardian Brothers | distribution outside China, Hong Kong, Taiwan and Macau only; released under Mizchief on Netflix under the company's supervision; produced by Light Chaser Animation Studios |
| October 25, 2019 | The Current War | uncredited; the last film produced by The Weinstein Company; distributed by 101 Studios |

== TV series ==
| Title | Years | Network | Notes |
|---|---|---|---|
| Project Runway | 2005–2017 | Bravo; Lifetime | co-production with Miramax Television |
| The No. 1 Ladies' Detective Agency | 2008–2009 | BBC One and HBO | |
| Models of the Runway | 2009–2010 | Lifetime | |
| On the Road with Austin & Santino | 2010 | Lifetime | |
| Mob Wives | 2011–2016 | VH1 | |
| Project Accessory | 2011 | Lifetime | |
| Project Runway All Stars | 2012–2018 | Lifetime | |
| Mob Wives: The Sit Down | 2012 | VH1 | |
| Mob Wives Chicago | 2012 | VH1 | |
| Big Ang | 2012 | VH1 | |
| Supermarket Superstar | 2013 | Lifetime | |
| Miami Monkey | 2013 | VH1 | |
| Peaky Blinders | 2013–2017 | BBC Two | U.S. distribution only (credits removed from the fourth season onward) |
| Under the Gunn | 2014 | Lifetime | |
| Project Runway: Threads | 2014 | Lifetime | |
| Marco Polo | 2014–2016 | Netflix | |
| Scream | 2015–2016 | MTV | produced by Dimension Television and Signpost Up Ahead; DiGa Vision and MTV Production Development (credits removed from the third season onward) |
| Project Runway: Junior | 2015–2017 | Lifetime | |
| War & Peace | 2016 | BBC One | North American and Chinese distribution only |
| Project Runway: Fashion Startup | 2016 | Lifetime | |
| Time: The Kalief Browder Story | 2017 | Spike | |
| Waco | 2018 | Paramount Network | Names of Harvey Weinstein, who served as executive producer, and Weinstein Company removed from credits |

== RADiUS-TWC ==
| Release date | Title | Notes |
|---|---|---|
| September 7, 2012 | Bachelorette* | North American distribution only |
| September 28, 2012 | Solomon Kane* | |
| October 5, 2012 | Butter* | |
| October 26, 2012 | Pusher* | U.S. distribution only |
| November 2, 2012 | The Details* | distribution only |
| November 30, 2012 | Dragon* | distribution outside Asia and French-speaking Europe only |
| December 7, 2012 | Lay the Favorite* | U.S. distribution only |
| January 19, 2013 | Inequality for All* | distribution in North America, the U.K., Ireland, Australia, New Zealand and South Africa only |
| April 5, 2013 | 6 Souls* | |
| May 10, 2013 | Aftershock* | |
| May 17, 2013 | Erased* | |
| June 21, 2013 | 20 Feet from Stardom* | North American distribution only Winner of the Academy Award for Best Documentary Feature; Inducted into the National Film Registry in 2023 |
| July 19, 2013 | Only God Forgives* | U.S. distribution only; produced by Gaumont and Wild Bunch |
| August 9, 2013 | Lovelace* | North American distribution only |
| August 16, 2013 | Cutie and the Boxer* | North American and French distribution only Nominee of the Academy Award for Best Documentary Feature |
| September 6, 2013 | All the Boys Love Mandy Lane* | |
| September 20, 2013 | The Art of the Steal* | U.S. distribution only; produced by Darius Films |
| October 4, 2013 | Concussion* | North American distribution only |
| November 1, 2013 | Man of Tai Chi* | North American distribution only; produced by Universal Pictures, Village Roadshow Pictures Asia and China Film Group |
| April 4, 2014 | The Unknown Known* | North American distribution only |
| April 18, 2014 | 13 Sins* | produced by Dimension Films |
| April 25, 2014 | Blue Ruin* | North American distribution only |
| May 9, 2014 | Fed Up* | distribution only |
| June 6, 2014 | Supermensch: The Legend of Shep Gordon* | U.S. distribution only |
| June 27, 2014 | Snowpiercer* | distribution in North America, the U.K., Ireland, Australia, New Zealand and South Africa only |
| August 8, 2014 | The One I Love* | distribution only |
| August 22, 2014 | 14 Blades* | |
| September 19, 2014 | Keep On Keepin' On* | distribution only |
| October 10, 2014 | Citizenfour* | North American distribution excluding television only Winner of the Academy Award for Best Documentary Feature |
| October 29, 2014 | The Great Invisible* | |
| October 29, 2014 | Horns* | U.S. co-distribution with Dimension Films only; produced by Red Granite Pictures and Mandalay Pictures |
| February 13, 2015 | The Last Five Years* | |
| February 27, 2015 | Everly* | U.S. co-distribution with Dimension Films only |
| February 27, 2015 | The Hunting Ground* | North American distribution only |
| February 27, 2015 | My Life Directed by Nicolas Winding Refn* | |
| March 13, 2015 | It Follows* | U.S. distribution only |
| April 17, 2015 | Monsters: Dark Continent | |
| April 24, 2015 | Adult Beginners* | U.S. distribution only |
| May 29, 2015 | Heaven Knows What* | U.S. distribution only |
| June 26, 2015 | Escobar: Paradise Lost* | North American distribution only |
| July 21, 2015 | Before We Go* | U.S. distribution only |
| July 21, 2015 | A Lego Brickumentary* | distribution only |
| August 28, 2015 | When Animals Dream* | U.S. distribution only |
| September 11, 2015 | Goodnight Mommy* | North American distribution only |
| July 29, 2016 | Viral* | co-distributed with Dimension Films |
| October 12, 2017 | Amityville: The Awakening* | co-distributed with Dimension Films |

== See also ==
- List of The Weinstein Company animated films
