= List of The Weinstein Company animated films =

This is a list of theatrical animated feature films produced or released by The Weinstein Company.

The Weinstein Company releases films from Weinstein-owned and non-Weinstein owned animation studios. Most films listed below are from Kanbar Entertainment which distributed animated films for The Weinstein Company, producing its first feature-length animated film Hoodwinked! in 2005. The Weinstein Company has also released animated films by other production companies, such as Prana Studios.

== Films ==
Color legend
Metro-Goldwyn-Mayer (2007-2008)	
Kanbar Entertainment (2005-2011)	
Prana Studios (2008-2013)	
Third-party studio	
Live-action/animation hybrid	^{S}
Distribution only	^{[D]}

Titles	Original theatrical release date	Animation studio
The Thief and the Cobbler	September 23, 1993 (Note: Released by The Weinstein Company in North America)	Miramax, Richard Williams Productions, The Completion Bond Company and Allied Filmmakers
Leo the Lion ^{[D]}	June 17, 2005	Dujass Film and Netflix
Hoodwinked!	December 16, 2005	Kanbar Entertainment
Doogal	February 24, 2006	Pathé and Action Synthese
The Blue Elephant	May 18, 2006	Kantana Animation, Kantana Group Public Co., and Sahamongkol Film International
The Great Music Caper	June 9, 2006	Millimages
The Reef	July 7, 2006	WonderWorld Studios, DigiArt, and FXDigital
Arthur and the Invisibles ^{[S]}	January 12, 2007	MGM and EuropaCorp
TMNT	March 23, 2007 (Note: Released by The Weinstein Company outside North America)	Imagi Animation Studios and Warner Bros.
Trick or Treaters	October 18, 2007	Animation X Gesellschaft zur Produktion von Animationsfilmen mbH
3 Pigs and a Baby	March 4, 2008	Prana Studios and The Jim Henson Company
Tortoise vs. Hare	September 9, 2008	Prana Studios and The Jim Henson Company
Space Chimps^{[D]}	July 18, 2008	Starz Animation, 20th Century Fox, and Vanguard Animation
Igor ^{[D]}	September 19, 2008	MGM and Exodus Film Group
The Flight Before Christmas	November 1, 2008	Anima Vitae, A. Film A/S, Pictorion Magma Animation, and Magma Films
The Nutty Professor	November 25, 2008	Mainframe Entertainment Inc.
The Goldilocks and the 3 Bears Show	December 16, 2008	Prana Studios and The Jim Henson Company
Santa's Apprentice ^{[D]}	November 24, 2010	Gaumont Alphanim and Flying Bark Productions
Little Gobie	December 11, 2010	BXE Productions
Hoodwinked Too! Hood vs. Evil	April 29, 2011	Kanbar Entertainment
The Prodigies ^{[D]}	June 8, 2011	Onyx Films, Studio 37, Fidelite Films, DQ Entertainment and LuxAnimation
The Reef 2: High Tide	October 30, 2012	WonderWorld Studios
Escape from Planet Earth	February 15, 2013	Rainmaker Entertainment
Underdogs	July 18, 2013 (Argentina) (Note: The film was distributed by Universal Pictures worldwide)	Prana Studios
Saving Santa ^{[D]}	November 1, 2013	Gateway Films and Prana Studios
The Magic Snowflake ^{[D]}	November 20, 2013	Gaumont Animation, Snipple Animation, and Dapaco Productions
The Nut Job ^{[D]}	January 17, 2014	ToonBox Entertainment
Little Door Gods	December 25, 2015	Light Chaser Animation Studios
The Nut Job 2: Nutty by Nature ^{[D]}	August 11, 2017	ToonBox Entertainment
Leap!	August 25, 2017	Entertainment One

== Highest-grossing films ==
This list does not include films combining live-action with animation.

Rank	Film	Gross	Studio	Year	Ref
1	The Nut Job	$120,885,527	Open Road Films	2014	
2	Hoodwinked!	$109,843,390	Kanbar Entertainment	2006	
3	Leap!	$96,890,794	Entertainment One	2017	
4	TMNT	$96,096,018	Imagi Animation Studios and Warner Bros. Pictures	2007	
5	Escape from Planet Earth	$74,156,610	Rainmaker Entertainment	2013	
6	The Nut Job 2: Nutty by Nature	$57,424,952	Open Road Films	2017	
7	Igor	$30,747,504	Metro-Goldwyn-Mayer	2008	
8	Doogal	$28,058,652	Pathé	2006	

== See also ==
- List of Lionsgate theatrical animated feature films (they are from The Weinstein Company's predecessor)
- List of The Weinstein Company films
- List of Disney theatrical animated feature films
