= Splat the Cat =

American-British children's picture book

- Author: Rob Scotton
- Language: English
- Genre: children's books picture books
- Publisher: HarperCollins
- Publication date: 1 July 2008
- Publication place: United Kingdom; United States
- Pages: 40
- ISBN: 978-0-06-083154-7
- OCLC: 233172584
- Dewey Decimal: [E] 22
- LC Class: PZ7.S4334 Sp 2008

Splat the Cat is a 2008 children's picture book by Rob Scotton. The book was made into an animated 9-minute short in 2010 by Weston Woods Studios, with animation by Soup2Nuts.

In 2020, the book was adapted into a French animated series, Splat & Seymour (Splat et Harry in French). which is co-produced by Prana Studios.

== Plot ==
Splat is so scared of his first day of Cat School that his tail moves with worry. He needs a friend, so he takes his pet, a mouse named Seymour, with him to school. Mrs. Wimpydimple covers many topics, such as self-esteem and nature. When Seymour gets out of Splat's lunchbox, the cats chase after him. The teacher saves Seymour. By day two, Splat's tail moves with excitement.

== Reception ==
A Kirkus Reviews review says, "From the blackboard lessons to the store-window signs advertising white chocolate mice, jelly fish and fish cakes, environmental print creates visual interest. Splat himself is a hoot with his spindly legs, flyaway fur and highly expressive tail. Sure to stir things up at storytime." Stephanie Zvirin, of Booklist reviewed the book saying "Splat’s very visible, very childlike enthusiasms and concerns will resonate with kids, who will flip through the pictures more than once." A Publishers Weekly review says, "Rambunctious, filled with superbly executed details (look for Seymour when Splat pulls his mildly sheer sheets over his head), this book not only gets its job done, it completely transcends its agenda." Splat the Cat was a New York Times bestseller and Time magazine number four picture book of 2008.
