= Marvel Experience =

Traveling interactive attraction

Ride statistics
- Manufacturer: Absolute Hollywood
- Designer: Aaron Sims
- Site area: 80,000 sq ft (7,400 m^{2})
- Duration: 2 hours
- Lead producers: Jason Rosen; Michael Cohl; Jesse Harris
- VFX and animation: Rhythm & Hues; Prana Studios
- Previsualization: Third Floor
- Composer: Randy Miller
- Production Companies: Marvel Entertainment; Hero Venture; S2BN Entertainment
- Website: Official website
- This is a pay-per-use attraction

The Marvel Experience: The World's First Hyper-Reality Tour was a mobile interactive attraction that aimed to bring the Marvel Universe to life through immersive experiences. Launched in late 2014, this touring event was a collaboration between Marvel Entertainment, Hero Ventures, and S2BN Entertainment.

The attraction was set within a series of large inflatable domes, covering about 2 acres, and was designed to provide an immersive experience for Marvel fans. Visitors could engage in various activities, including interactive games, motion rides, 3D and 4D experiences, augmented reality, and more, all centered around Marvel's superheroes. The event featured characters like Spider-Man, Iron Man, the Hulk, and the Avengers, with a storyline that allowed attendees to become S.H.I.E.L.D. recruits and help save the world from a global threat.

The attraction faced mixed reviews from attendees, with some praising the immersive environment and others pointing out issues such as technical glitches and long wait times. The tour initially visited several U.S. cities, including Dallas, Philadelphia, and San Diego.

However, after a short run, The Marvel Experience was abruptly canceled in early 2015, with the remaining tour dates being scrapped. The reasons for its closure included logistical challenges, operational costs, and the need for improvements that could not be addressed in time.

Since then, The Marvel Experience has remained inactive, with no official plans for its revival.

== History ==
As early as 2011, Hero Ventures approached Marvel Entertainment about a traveling attraction. They agreed upon a seven-figure upfront licensing fee with a media royalty of 15% median royalty. Hero Venture then sought out additional funding for the project.

On August 22, 2013, Marvel Entertainment announced that it was working with Hero Ventures on The Marvel Experience, a traveling production and attraction.

On January 9, 2014, Hero Ventures unveiled the dome design image. On October 10, tickets went on sale. A preview of the Experience was scheduled for Phoenix from December 12 to January 3, 2015, then officially premiered on January 9, 2015, in Dallas.

Due to its popularity, Hero Ventures announced an extension of the San Diego stay until March 1, 2015, and a shift in plans to visit Philadelphia before heading to Chicago, New York, and St. Louis for the show's opening in April 2015. Instead, the show was reworked. The tour went to Philadelphia, with plans to visit Chicago, New York, and St. Louis. In July, Hero Ventures announced that the show's summer tour would end prematurely, after only a three-week run in Philadelphia, for reasons not disclosed. Prepaid ticket holders were given refunds.

== Design ==
The $30 million attraction consisted of a dome complex, which is equivalent in size to two football fields. It featured a "4D motion ride", projected animation, motion comics, virtual reality, and holographic simulations along with social media.

Movie conceptual artist Aaron Sims was the designer on the attraction with Jerry Rees, as director and VFX by Rhythm & Hues and Prana Studios. Lexington Design + Fabrication produced the interactive elements. The mobile dome complex was designed to look like a S.H.I.E.L.D. Mobile Command Centre.

The domes were constructed from PVC resin, polymer, and other components. The structures, designed by Absolute Hollywood live event company, were six stories tall.

== Performance ==
Attendees interacted with several Marvel heroes and S.H.I.E.L.D. agents during the two-hour performance, in which they fought Hydra with a final battle against the Red Skull, MODOK, and their Adaptoids.

Kevin Smith was revealed in Del Mar, California as the voice of M.O.D.O.K.

== Tour ==
Dates	City	Location
November 12, 2014 - January 3, 2015	Phoenix	Salt River Fields at Talking Stick
January 9, 2015 - February 1, 2015	Dallas	Cotton Bowl
February 7, 2015 - March 1, 2015	San Diego	Del Mar Fairgrounds
June 19, 2015 - July 5, 2015	Philadelphia	Lincoln Financial Field

Each tour stop was slated to last between 17 and 24 days. The cost of each attraction location was estimated to be $2.5 million.

== Hero Ventures ==
Hero Ventures, LLC
- Type: private Limited liability company
- Industry: Entertainment
- Founded: November 14, 2012 in Los Angeles, US
- Founders: Rick Licht; Doug Schaer; Jason Rosen
- Headquarters: Westwood, Los Angeles, USA
- Number of locations: 2
- Key people: Rick Licht (CEO); Doug Schaer (COO); Jason Rosen (CPO)
- Production output: Traveling attractions
- Total equity: $16.5 million
- Members: Rick Licht; Doug Schaer; Michael Cohl; Jesse Harris; Steve Tisch; Shamrock Holdings; Maurice & Paul Marciano; WWE; Vista Equity Partners president Brian Sheth; Ross Hilton Kemper; Enlight Media
- Number of employees: 50
- Website: hero-ventures.com

Hero Ventures, LLC is an entertainment company that produces traveling shows. The company is based in Westwood, Los Angeles.

=== Company history ===
In 2009, Rick Licht started working full-time on a yet unnamed venture which was his and Doug Schafer's business idea that they had been discussing over the years. In 2011, Licht was joined by Schaer as chief operating officer and Jason Rosen as chief production officer. Hero Ventures first approached the National Baseball Hall of Fame for a dome show but was turned down. They then developed a new list of project partners that was topped with Marvel Entertainment, who agreed to a seven-figure licensing deal for the movable dome show, which brought on Michael Cohl and Jesse Harris to pay the upfront fee.

Hero Ventures (HV) was formed into a Limited liability company on November 14, 2012, in Los Angeles by Licht, Schaer and Rosen. Before the August 22, 2013 announcement of its first project, The Marvel Experience, the company received "A" round investment commitments from Steve Tisch, Roy P. Disney & Shamrock Holdings, Maurice & Paul Marciano, WWE, Vista Equity Partners president Brian Sheth, Ross Hilton Kemper, and Enlight Media to fund that project. This raised funding of $16.5 million allowing them to move into an office in Westwood, Los Angeles and start taking salaries. Additional funding came from advances on royalties from vendors and $10 million from co-production partners with some partners taking profit participation. With the announcement of Marvel Experience, several other IP holders started making inquiries about doing similar projects for their properties, but HV held off on additional attractions until its current project was shown a success.

On October 10, 2014, The Marvel Experience tickets went on sale. In early December 2014, Magic Johnson was announced as an investor and member of its Board of Managers. A preview of the experience was scheduled for Phoenix from December 12-January 3, 2015, with an official premiere on January 9, 2015, in Dallas. They are no longer touring.

== See also ==
- Iron Man Experience
- Marvel Universe Live!
- Marvel Super Heroes 4D
- Spider-Man: Turn Off the Dark
