= Franklin Leonard Pope =

American engineer, explorer, and inventor

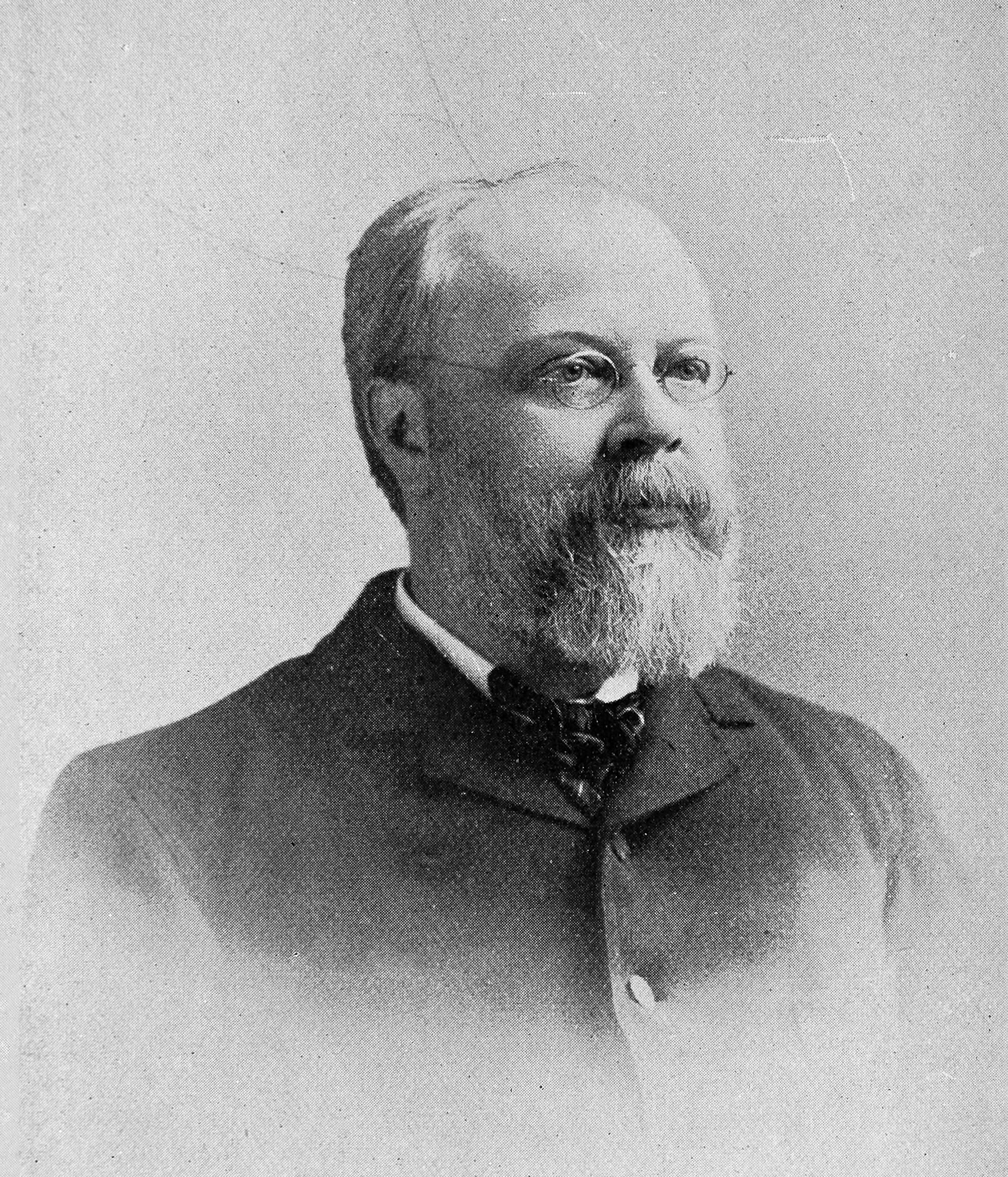
- Franklin L. Pope was portrayed in the August 1892 edition of Cassier's Magazine
- Born: December 2, 1840; Great Barrington, Massachusetts
- Died: October 13, 1895 (aged 54); Great Barrington, Massachusetts
- Known for: Inventor
- Spouse: Sarah Amelia Dickinson (m. 1873)
- Children: 4

Franklin Leonard Pope (December 2, 1840 – October 13, 1895) was an American engineer, explorer, and inventor.

== Biography ==
He was born in Great Barrington, Massachusetts in December 1840, the son of Ebenezer Pope and Electra Wainwright. He was a telegrapher, electrical engineer, explorer, inventor, and patent attorney.

He was also a major contributor to the technological advances of the 19th century. He was one of the leaders of the explorations related to the Collins Overland Telegraph, otherwise known as the Russian American Telegraph.

After developing a system which tracked and printed the prices of gold and stocks, Pope partnered with Thomas Edison in 1869, forming the company Pope, Edison & Company Electrical Engineers, and invented a one-wire telegraph in 1870. This telegraph is now known as a stock ticker, and was widely used in large cities for exchange quotations. Pope's partnership with Edison ended shortly after it was formed.

Pope was awarded several patents for his work in railroad semaphore lock signal systems, the most important of which was his 1872 invention for the rail circuit for automatic control of the electric-block signal system, which was widely used by the major U.S. railways. Pope was president of the American Institute of Electrical Engineers from 1886 to 1887.

Pope was an editor of the magazine Electrical Engineer, and edited the electrical section of The Engineering Magazine. Pope also worked as a patent attorney for Western Union Telegraph Company, and was retained as an expert in many important patent suits.

Pope married Sarah Amelia Dickinson on August 6, 1873; they had four children, two daughters and two sons. His youngest child, Seth Willard Pope, died a few weeks after birth.

Pope died at the age of 54 as a result of an accidental electrocution by 3000 volts in the basement of his home at 518 Main Street in Great Barrington. His home is now a Bed and Breakfast called the Wainwright Inn B&B.

== Pope's publications ==
- Modern Practice of the American Telegraph (1869)
- Modern Practice of the Electrical Telegraph (1871)
- The Life and Works of Joseph Henry (1879)
- Pope, Franklin Leobard (1886). The Western Boundary of Massachusetts: a study of Indian and Colonial Life. Pittsfield, Mass.: Privately Printed.
- Pope, Franklin Leobard (1889). Evolution of the Incandescent Lamp. Elizabeth, NJ: Henry Cook.
- Pope, Franklin Leonard (1888). Genealogy of Thomas Pope (1608–1683) and Some of his Descendants.

== In popular culture ==
In the 2017 film The Current War, Pope is portrayed by Stanley Townsend.
