= List of Lionsgate theatrical animated feature films =

Film list

This list of theatrical animated feature films consists of animated films produced or released by Lionsgate.

Lionsgate releases films from Lionsgate-owned and non-Lionsgate owned animation studios. Most films listed below are from Splash Entertainment which produced animated films for Lionsgate, producing its first feature-length animated film Norm of the North in 2016. Lionsgate has also released animated films by other production companies, such as Aardman Animations.

== Films ==
Color legend
nWave Pictures (2008–16)	
Aardman Animations (2015–18)	
Splash Entertainment (2016–2023)	
Other Lionsgate studio	
Third-party studio	
Distribution only	^{D}
Distributed by Lionsgate but only in the U.K.	^{UK}

Title	Original theatrical release date (Note: Listed are the original theatrical release dates in the United States (or other non-U.S. territories) when the film was contributed by Lionsgate. Different distributors are attributed and credited for distributing each film throughout the history of Lionsgate.)	Animation studio
I Married a Strange Person!^{[D]}	August 28, 1998 (Note: Limited release in the United States.)	Italtoons
Jonah: A VeggieTales Movie[D]	October 4, 2002 (Note: In 2018, Universal Pictures (who owns Veggietales under DreamWorks Animation and DreamWorks Classics, the latter who owns Big Idea Entertainment) bought the film from Lionsgate (the owner of Artisan Entertainment, the distributor of the film).)	Big Idea Productions and FHE Pictures
Happily N'Ever After^{[D]}	December 16, 2006	Vanguard Animation
Fly Me to the Moon^{[D]}	August 15, 2008 (Note: Released by Lionsgate in North America)	nWave Pictures (Note: Released by Summit Entertainment)
Battle for Terra^{[D]}	May 1, 2009	Snoot Entertainment
Astro Boy^{[D]}	October 23, 2009	Imagi Animation Studios
Furry Vengeance[D]	April 30, 2010	Participant Media
Alpha and Omega^{[D]}	September 17, 2010	Crest Animation Productions
Tarzan^{[D]}	May 9, 2014	Ambient Entertainment
Moomins on the Riviera^{[UK]} ^{[D]}	May 22, 2015	Handle Productions and Pictak Cie
Shaun the Sheep Movie^{[D]}	August 5, 2015	Aardman Animations
Norm of the North^{[D]}	January 15, 2016	Splash Entertainment and Assemblage Entertainment
The Wild Life^{[D]}	September 9, 2016	nWave Pictures
Middle School: The Worst Years of My Life[D]	October 7, 2016	Participant Media
Rock Dog^{[D]}	February 24, 2017	Reel FX Animation Studios and Mandoo Pictures
My Little Pony: The Movie^{[D]}	October 6, 2017	Allspark Pictures and DHX Media
Early Man^{[D]}	February 16, 2018	Aardman Animations
Monkey Quest [D]	2027	Toei Animation and Sola Digital Arts

== Highest grossing films ==
Rank	Film	Gross	Studio	Year	Ref
1	Shaun the Sheep Movie	$106,209,378	Aardman	2015	
2	My Little Pony: The Movie	$60,330,833	DHX Media	2017	
3	Early Man	$54,622,814	Aardman	2018	
4	Alpha and Omega	$50,507,267	Crest Animation Productions	2010	
5	Tarzan	$44,095,996	Summit Entertainment	2013	
6	Fly Me to the Moon	$41,721,414	nWave Pictures	2008	
7	The Wild Life	$40,075,446	nWave Pictures	2016	
8	Astro Boy	$39,886,986	Imagi Animation Studios	2009	
9	Happily N'Ever After	$38,085,778	Vanguard Animation	2007	
10	Norm of the North	$30,734,502	Splash Entertainment	2016	

== See also ==
- List of The Weinstein Company animated films (they are from one of Lionsgate's predecessor)
