= Lantern Entertainment =

American independent film studio

Lantern Entertainment, LLC
- Type: Private
- Industry: Film; Television
- Predecessor: The Weinstein Company (2005–2018)
- Founded: July 16, 2018; 8 years ago
- Founders: Andy Mitchell; Milos Brajovic
- Headquarters: Dallas, Texas, United States
- Key people: Andy Mitchell (president); Milos Brajovic (president)
- Products: Motion pictures Television programs
- Owner: Lantern Capital Partners
- Number of employees: 50 (2018)
- Divisions: Lantern Television; Spyglass Media Group (majority stake)
- Website: lanternent.com

Lantern Entertainment, LLC is an American independent film and television production company founded by Lantern Capital Partners on July 16, 2018.

The studio was formed from the acquired assets of TWC in a bankruptcy auction. TWC filed for bankruptcy as a result of co-founder Harvey Weinstein being convicted of sexual harassment, assault, and rape. Lantern Entertainment is a separate company unaffiliated with the Weinsteins.

== History ==
On July 16, 2018, the Dallas-based equity firm Lantern Capital Partners bought the assets of TWC for $289 million. Lantern Entertainment was formed and assumed the rights to TWC's 277-film library. In November 2018, Lantern acquired full control of three Quentin Tarantino films (Inglourious Basterds, Django Unchained and The Hateful Eight), originally released by The Weinstein Company, for $5.5 million.

In February 2019, Lantern was reported to be reaching a settlement with The Walt Disney Company, regarding several films that Lantern did not acquire (including Scream 4 and The Matador).

On March 13, 2019, Lantern and Gary Barber relaunched Spyglass Media Group, which would absorb all of TWC's assets into the new company. Italian film distributor Eagle Pictures, cinema chain Cineworld (which owned and operated Regal Cinemas) and later WarnerMedia/AT&T's Warner Bros. were brought in as minority holders. Lantern made a majority investment including its film library to Spyglass. In July 2019, Spyglass settled two major claims, including $11 million for Viacom regarding the TV series Scream (whose last season was delayed until July 2019, three years after the second season finale) and the film Sin City: A Dame to Kill For (which Lantern did not acquire).

== Assets ==
=== Current ===
Motion pictures

- Spyglass Media Group (with Lionsgate Studios, Warner Bros. Pictures, Cineworld and Eagle Pictures)

Television

- Lantern Television

=== Content libraries ===
- The Weinstein Company film library (also includes the post-2005 Dimension Films library; most of these were sold to Lionsgate through Spyglass Media Group)

=== Former ===
- Radius – dormant; folded into Lantern Entertainment
- Dimension Films – defunct; now as an in-name-only unit subsidiary

== Radius ==
Radius
- Formerly: Radius-TWC (2012–18)
- Type: Label
- Industry: Film
- Founded: 2012; 14 years ago
- Founder: Tom Quinn; Jason Janego
- Defunct: 2018; 8 years ago
- Fate: Dormancy
- Successors: Studio: NEON; Library: Lionsgate (excluding Monsters: Dark Continent, owned by Metro-Goldwyn-Mayer)
- Products: Motion pictures
- Owner: The Weinstein Company (2012–2018); Lantern Entertainment (2018)

Radius (stylized as RADiUS; formerly Radius-TWC) was a film label by Lantern Entertainment, formerly to TWC's division, for distribution of multi-platform video-on-demand and theatrical productions. It was launched in 2012 by Tom Quinn and Jason Janego, and specialized in niche and independent films rather than those aimed at mainstream audiences.

As of 2018, Radius had released about 35 films, including Bachelorette, Butter, 20 Feet from Stardom, Only God Forgives, Lovelace, All the Boys Love Mandy Lane, Man of Tai Chi, Fed Up, Snowpiercer, Citizenfour, Horns, The Last Five Years, and It Follows.

In August 2015, both Quinn and Janego left the company, with Quinn later founding NEON with Tim League in 2017. NEON is set to produce a sequel to It Follows, a film originally distributed by Radius. Filming would begin in 2024.

== Filmography ==
=== Feature films ===
Film	Release date	Notes
The Upside	January 11, 2019	Co-distribution with STX Entertainment
Polaroid	October 11, 2019	International co-distribution with 13 Films vía Dimension Films; distributed in the US by Vertical Entertainment
The Current War	October 25, 2019	International co-distribution with 13 Films; distributed in the US by 101 Studios
The Boys in the Boat	December 25, 2023	Production company only

=== Television series ===
Show	Network	Years
Project Runway	Bravo; Lifetime; Freeform	2019–present
Scream	VH1	2019
