= Leo the Lion (2005 film) =

- DVD cover
- Directed by: Mario Cambi
- Written by: Mario Cambi; Pierstefano Marangoni
- Story by: Mario Cambi
- Produced by: Veronica Salvi; Mario Ambrosino
- Starring: Neri Marcorè; Leo Gullotta; Carlo Conti
- Edited by: Claudio Di Mauro
- Music by: Alessandro Molinari
- Production company: Dujass Film
- Distributed by: 01 Distribution
- Release date: 17 June 2005
- Running time: 75 minutes
- Country: Italy
- Language: Italian

Leo the Lion (Italian: La Storia Di Leo) is a 2005 Italian animated adventure musical film directed by Mario Cambi, who co-wrote the screenplay with Pierstefano Marangoni, from an original concept by Cambi. It stars Neri Marcorè, Leo Gullotta and Carlo Conti. The film follows Leo, a lion who exhibits a vegetarian diet which causes him to be an outcast among his pride.

Produced by Dujass Film, the film had a limited theatrical release in Italy on June 17, 2005. In the United States, an English-dub of the film was released onto Netflix by The Weinstein Company on July 18, 2013.

== Plot ==
In the African savannas, a lion named Leo struggles to fit in his pride. While hunting for stampeding of zebras with the other lions, Leo's mother dies by falling over a waterfall on the day he goes for his first hunt. After that traumatic experience, he develops a fear of water. Being bullied by the other lions, he leaves them and starts travel through the forest, then living in a tree. One day, he meets Savannah, a female elephant, and helps her deliver her twin baby elephants. It is later mentioned that her husband, Eli Phant, was killed by humans. However, it is revealed that he was actually knocked out by a vicious, scary and bloodthirsty white elephant named Maximus Elefante and then taken to a zoo. After the delivery, the little calves consider him to be their father and follow him constantly. When Leo decides to find the Heart of the Jungle, a place Leo's mother once told him about before she died, he is accompanied by the elephants and Uncle Lope, an elderly antelope. They meet many other young animals on their quest, such as a young zebra. After having lots of adventures, they eventually find the Heart of the Jungle, which is also the home of a chameleon. The latter allows to three orphans, a leopard cub and a duo of monkeys, to stay in her place. On the way back, Maximus, who was following the company, finds the two baby elephants, kidnaps them, and claims that he saved them from Leo. Maximus then tries to marry Savannah, but Leo turns up at the last moment and stops the wedding. Suddenly, a helicopter appears and captures Maximus for good. The movie finishes by showing an old Leo talking to his nephews, two elephant-lion hybrids.

== Cast ==
=== Italian version ===
- Neri Marcorè as Leo
- Carlo Conti as Zanco (Maximus Elefante)
- Leo Gullotta as Cobo (Uncle Lope)
- Simona Marchini as Avoria (Savannah)
- Elio Pandolfi as Lady Camea

=== English version ===
- Daniel Amerman as Leo
- John Cygan as Uncle Lope
- Matthew Mercer as Maximus Elefante
- Amanda Allan as Savannah
- Porter Hansen as Shaman
- Debi Derryberry as Baby Elephants
- Mari Devon as Leo's Mom
- Eileen Galindo as Goo Roo / Beatrice
- Michael Sorich as Eli Phant / Hyena #1
- Cristina Pucelli as Nanou / Baby Monkey #2
- Grant George as Crocodiles / Hyena #2
- Fabiana Arrastia as Zebra Mom
- Bailey Gambertoglio as Spots / Lion Cub
- Cole Sand as Ebony
- Terrence Stone as Snake / Hyena #3 / Vulture #1

== Reception ==
Common Sense Media gave the movie one star out of five, calling it a "horrible Pixar rip-off with terrible songs, annoying voices, subpar animation, and a poorly executed story line".
