= Unstable Fables =

Animated film trilogy

Unstable Fables is a trilogy of animated films produced by The Jim Henson Company in association with Flame Ventures, Prana Studios, and The Weinstein Company. The direct-to-DVD feature-length films were distributed by Genius Products.

The films' casts include Brad Garrett, Jay Leno and Jamie Lynn Spears. The films irreverently and unfaithfully retell classic fairy tales, folktales, and fables with a modern twist. The first film, 3 Pigs and a Baby (based on "The Three Little Pigs"), was released on DVD on March 4, 2008. The second title, Tortoise vs. Hare (based on "The Tortoise and the Hare"), was released on September 9, 2008. The third and final release, The Goldilocks and the 3 Bears Show (based on "Goldilocks and the Three Bears"), was released on December 16, 2008.

== 3 Pigs and a Baby ==
3 Pigs and a Baby
- DVD cover
- Directed by: Howard E. Baker; Arish Fyzee
- Written by: Craig Bartlett; Joseph Purdy
- Starring: Jon Cryer; Brad Garrett; Steve Zahn; Jesse McCartney; Timothy McCartney; Steve Wilcox
- Music by: Jim Lang
- Production companies: The Jim Henson Company; Prana Animation Studios; Flame Ventures; The Weinstein Company
- Distributed by: Genius Products
- Release date: March 4, 2008
- Running time: 76 minutes
- Country: United States
- Language: English

3 Pigs and a Baby is the first animated film in the series based on "The Three Little Pigs". The direct-to-DVD film was released on March 4, 2008 and stars Jon Cryer, Brad Garrett, Steve Zahn and Jesse McCartney.

=== Plot ===
The Three Little Pigs become the target of a special-ops team of wolves. The wolves plan to finally infiltrate the impenetrable house of bricks by leaving a tiny wolf cub on the unassuming pigs' doorstep. The pigs take the baby in and raise him as their own. The newest addition to their family, Lucky, grows up into his teens not knowing his history, his role in the wolves' plan or the difficult choice he will have to make about the family that raised him.

=== Cast ===
- Brad Garrett as Mason Pig
- Jon Cryer as Richard Pig
- Steve Zahn as Sandy Pig
- Jesse McCartney as Lucky Wolf
  - Timothy McCartney (Jesse McCartney's brother) as Lucky (baby/child)
- Tom Kenny as Dr. Wolfowitz, Musical Comedy Wolf
- Nolan North as Big Bad Wolf, Eager Young Wolf, Dash Hammet, Wolf Guard
- Mark Adair-Rios as Wide-Eyed Pacifist Wolf
- Tara Strong as Teen Girl Wolf, Construction Cow, Popular Girl
- Steve Wilcox as Big Boss Wolf, Lone Wolf and Grunt
- Audrey Wasilewski as Contractor Cow, Hamlet

=== DVD bonus features ===
- Animation Education: Behind the scenes of the animation process
- Re-Imagining A Classic: A conversation with director Howard Baker and writers Craig Barlett and Joseph Purdy
- The Voices of 3 Pigs and A Baby: Behind the scenes look at how the stars record their lines before animation is complete and how it all comes together.

== Tortoise vs. Hare ==
Tortoise vs. Hare
- DVD cover
- Directed by: Howard E. Baker; Arish Fyzee
- Written by: Tom Martin
- Starring: Jay Leno; Danny Glover; Vivica A. Fox; Keke Palmer; Drake Bell
- Music by: Jim Lang
- Production companies: The Jim Henson Company; Prana Animation Studios; Flame Ventures; The Weinstein Company
- Distributed by: Genius Products
- Release date: September 9, 2008
- Running time: 76 minutes
- Language: English

Tortoise vs. Hare is the second animated film in the "Unstable Fables" series. The direct-to-DVD film, based on Aesop's fable "The Tortoise and the Hare," was released on DVD on September 9, 2008

The film features the voices of Danny Glover, Jay Leno, Vivica A. Fox, Keke Palmer and Drake Bell.

The film won a Film Advisory Board award.

=== Plot ===
Fifteen years following his surprise victory over Murray Hare in a televised cross-country race, Walter Tortoise and his wife Dotty watch their daughter Crystal perform at her school talent show. Crystal performs a moving interpretive dance for which she only earns a 3rd place medal, to the chagrin of her father.

Meanwhile, Murray Hare works as a used car salesman before remembering to pick up his son Butch from the science fair. On the car ride home, Murray suggests joining the track team to Butch, who would prefer studying rocks, minerals, and astronomy. Suddenly, a radio broadcast advertising the Mt. Impossible Nature Adventure Race catches the attention of a redemption seeking Murray Hare. After arriving to their neighboring homes from the talent show and science fair, Murray and Walter pull into their driveways before they begin to exchange banter and brag about the accomplishments of their respective children. During this exchange, Murray challenges the Tortoise father-daughter duo on his son’s behalf. A challenge which Walter accepts quickly, before Crystal has a chance to voice her complaints.

Murray’s wife arrives from work momentarily and shares a brief exchange with Dotty, criticizing her stay at home nature.

The day of the race arrives, and the pairs are joined by fellow competing Pig and Mole family pairs. The race begins and ultimately the Mole family wins the race, citing furious excavation and ignoring personal problems as pivotal to winning the race.

=== Cast ===
- Jay Leno as Murray Hare
- Drake Bell as Butch Hare
- Danny Glover as Walter Tortoise
- Vivica A. Fox as Dotty Tortoise
- Keke Palmer as Crystal Tortoise
- Adam Friedman as Weasel
- Jenni Pulos as Annette Hare and Old Lady Rabbit
- Nolan North as Reporter #1 and #2
- Steve Wilcox as Mole Dad

=== DVD bonus features ===
- How to Draw a Character: Director Howard E. Baker shows how to draw a character from the film.
- The Voices of Tortoise vs. Hare: Behind the scenes look at how the stars record their lines before animation is complete and how it all comes together
- A Sneak Peek at the Next Unstable Fable: A look at The Goldilocks and the 3 Bears Show, the next Unstable Fable film.

== The Goldilocks and the 3 Bears Show ==
The Goldilocks and the 3 Bears Show
- DVD Cover
- Directed by: Howard E. Baker; Arish Fyzee
- Written by: Chris Parrish
- Starring: Jamie Lynn Spears; Brooke Shields; Tom Arnold
- Music by: Jim Lang
- Production companies: The Jim Henson Company; Prana Animation Studios; Flame Ventures; The Weinstein Company
- Distributed by: Genius Products
- Release date: December 16, 2008
- Running time: 78 minutes
- Country: United States
- Language: English

The Goldilocks and the 3 Bears Show (promotionally titled as simply Goldilocks and the 3 Bears) is the third and final animated film in the series. The film is a twisted retelling of the story of "Goldilocks and the Three Bears". The direct-to-DVD film was released on December 16, 2008. The film features the voices of Tom Arnold, Brooke Shields, and Jamie Lynn Spears.

=== Plot ===
Goldilocks, a spoiled television star, moves in with a family of three bears to be filmed in a Big Brother-style reality TV show.

=== Cast ===
- Tom Arnold as Mac Bear
- Brooke Shields as Ruby Bear
- Colton Parsons as Junior Bear
- Jamie Lynn Spears as Goldilocks
- Kevin Michael Richardson as Jay Weasel
- Jessica DiCicco as Misty
- Adam Friedman as Doddie
- Brian Jones as Eddie
- Ben Baker as Richard Pig
- Ronn Ozuk as Chad Frog
- Jenni Pulos as Old Lady Rabbit and Inga
- James Arnold Taylor as Cricket, Pig, Weasel
- Armando Valdes-Kennedy as Paparazzo #3
- Audrey Wasilewski as Rhonda
- Steve Wilcox as Grunt

=== DVD bonus features ===
- How to Draw a Character: Director Howard E. Baker shows a group of school children how to draw storyboards for a film.
- Making Goldilocks & the 3 Bears: An exclusive behind the scenes look at the animation process, voice recordings, and story development.
