= Prana Studios =

American animation and visual effects studio

Prana Studios, Inc.
- Type: Private
- Industry: Visual effects; CGI animation
- Founded: April 2003; 23 years ago
- Defunct: July 10, 2019; 7 years ago
- Headquarters: Los Angeles, California, U.S.
- Number of locations: 2 (Mumbai, India)
- Number of employees: 500-800
- Divisions: Rhythm & Hues Studios
- Website: Prana Studios

Prana Studios, Inc. was an American animation and visual effects company, founded in 2003 in Los Angeles, United States, with a wholly owned subsidiary in Mumbai, India. It was known for its high-quality computer animation and visual effects.

Prana Studios' investors include Reliance Industries and Mahindra Group.

== History ==
Prana Studios was founded in April 2003 by Arish Fyzee, Kristin Dornig and Pankaj Gunsagar. Prana opened a Mumbai subsidiary in 2003.

Prana produced highest-quality CGI imagery and intellectual property for worldwide markets, and for major U.S. studios also including several animation studios, in long-form animation, commercials, digital effects, and themed entertainment. Their computer-generated artistry included the digital CGI production for multiple animated features for The Walt Disney Company, including the Tinker Bell franchise and Planes for DisneyToon Studios, among others. Prana was hired by Kanbar Entertainment to rescue the digital production on the independent animated monster hit "Hoodwinked!,” and was instrumental in the final delivery, leading to a 110M box office hit. In 2006, The Weinstein Company launched a series of independent direct-to-video CGI feature-length films called The House of Magic - they were produced amongst others, by The Jim Henson Company, Flame Ventures and Prana Studios, Shout! Factory. The first released was 3 Pigs and a Baby, the second released was Tortoise vs. Hare and third and final released was The Goldilocks and the 3 Bears Show. Long form productions also included the independent Bollywood production Kuch Kuch Hota Hai for Dharma Productions, as well as the Pathé French animated film Why I Did (Not) Eat My Father.

Prana would later go on to produce CGI animation for other animated films and series, including Legends of Oz: Dorothy's Return for the now-defunct Summertime Entertainment, which shut down following of the Box-Office Disappointment of the film. Mexican animation company Ánima Estudios hired Prana Studios to contribute on CGI production for the films Top Cat: The Movie and Top Cat Begins, They later collaborated with French animation company Blue Spirit Animation to produce animation for Oggy and the Cockroaches: The Movie for Xilam, Kaeloo for Cube Creative, and the French animated series Splat & Harry (based on the book Splat the Cat written and illustrated by Rob Scotton). They also did animation and visual effects for Marvel Experience, an interactive attraction to bring Marvel Universe into new worlds.

On March 29, 2013, Prana Studios affiliate 34x118 Holdings, LLC won the bidding of Rhythm & Hues Studios in a bankruptcy auction. Post 2013, Rhythm&Hues and their VFX Supervisors were multiple Emmy and Visual Effects Society Award nominees and winners for their work on Game of Thrones.

Prana Studios, Inc. is the recipient of multiple Themed Entertainment nominations and Awards, including for the attraction "5D Castle Theatre" at the prestigious Chimelong Ocean Kingdom in Zuhai, China.

== Filmography ==
=== Feature films ===
Prana's only unproduced animated films were Kuch Kuch Hota Hai for Dharma Productions, Punk Farm for MGM, Wish directed by Cory Edwards, and both The Amazing Adventures of Zhu and The Secret of Zhu for MoonScoop.

Title	Original release date	Co-production with	Notes
Hoodwinked!	January 13, 2006	The Weinstein Company; Kanbar Entertainment	
Unstable Fables: 3 Pigs and a Baby	March 4, 2008	The Weinstein Company; The Jim Henson Company	
Unstable Fables: Tortoise vs. Hare	September 9, 2008	The Weinstein Company; The Jim Henson Company	
Tinker Bell	October 28, 2008	Walt Disney Pictures; DisneyToon Studios	
Unstable Fables: The Goldilocks and the 3 Bears Show	December 16, 2008	The Weinstein Company; The Jim Henson Company	
Tinker Bell and the Lost Treasure	October 27, 2009	DisneyToon Studios	
Tinker Bell and the Great Fairy Rescue	July 23, 2010 (Poland)	DisneyToon Studios	
Space Chimps 2: Zartog Strikes Back	October 5, 2010	Vanguard Animation WonderWorld Studios	
Tron: Legacy	November 30, 2010	Walt Disney Pictures	SFX only
Dylan Dog: Dead of Night	March 16, 2011 (Italy)	Hyde Park Entertainment; Platinum Studios	SFX only
Transformers: Dark of the Moon	June 28, 2011	Paramount Pictures	Additional special effects
Quest for Zhu	September 27, 2011	Universal Pictures; MoonScoop; The Dream Garden	
Secret of the Wings	August 16, 2012 (Ukraine)	DisneyToon Studios	
Legends of Oz: Dorothy's Return	June 14, 2013 (AIAFF)	Summertime Entertainment	
Metegol	July 18, 2013 (Argentina)	Universal Pictures International	Lighting, Compositing, Visual Effects, and Rendering
Planes	August 9, 2013	DisneyToon Studios	
Saving Santa	November 5, 2013	Gateway Films	
The Pirate Fairy	February 13, 2014 (Denmark)	DisneyToon Studios	
Postman Pat: The Movie	May 23, 2014	DreamWorks Classics	Co-animated with Xing Xing Digital Corporation
Planes: Fire & Rescue	July 18, 2014	DisneyToon Studios	
Tinker Bell and the Legend of the NeverBeast	December 12, 2014 (United Kingdom)	DisneyToon Studios	
Top Cat Begins	October 30, 2015	Ánima (company) Discreet Arts Productions Warner Bros. Pictures	Additional Animation
Duck Duck Goose (film)	March 9, 2018 (China)	GFM Animation Wanda Pictures Original Force Animation Jiangsu Yuandongli Computer Animation Co., Ltd Netflix	Additional Animation

=== Short films ===
Title	Original release date	Co-production with
The ChubbChubbs Save Xmas	August 8, 2007	Columbia Pictures; Sony Pictures Animation
Alex & Sylvia	April 2015	BRC Imagination Arts
Kaka's Great Adventure	May 2015	Chimelong Ocean Kingdom

=== Television ===
Title	Original release date	Co-production with	Notes
Pixie Hollow Games	November 19, 2011	DisneyToon Studios	
An Elf's Story: The Elf on the Shelf	November 26, 2011	Trick 3D	
Game of Thrones	April 17, 2011	HBO	VFX only
The VeggieTales Show	October 22, 2019	Big Idea Entertainment	
