= The Current War =

2017 historical drama film directed by Alfonso Gomez-Rejon

- Theatrical release poster
- Directed by: Alfonso Gomez-Rejon
- Written by: Michael Mitnick
- Produced by: Timur Bekmambetov; Basil Iwanyk
- Starring: Benedict Cumberbatch; Michael Shannon; Katherine Waterston; Tom Holland; Tuppence Middleton; Matthew Macfadyen; Nicholas Hoult
- Cinematography: Chung Chung-hoon
- Edited by: David Trachtenberg; Justin Krohn
- Music by: Volker Bertelmann; Dustin O'Halloran
- Production companies: Bazelevs Company; Film Rites; Thunder Road Pictures; Fourth Floor Productions; Lantern Entertainment; The Weinstein Company (uncredited)
- Distributed by: 101 Studios (United States); Entertainment Film Distributors (United Kingdom); Lantern Entertainment (International)
- Release dates: September 9, 2017 (TIFF); October 25, 2019 (United States)
- Running time: 107 minutes
- Countries: United States; Russia; United Kingdom
- Language: English
- Budget: $30 million
- Box office: $12.9 million

The Current War (Note: Released theatrically as The Current War: Director's Cut) is a 2017 historical drama film inspired by the 19th-century competition between Thomas Edison and George Westinghouse over which electric power delivery system would be used in the United States (often referred to as the "war of the currents"). Directed by Alfonso Gomez-Rejon, written by Michael Mitnick, and executive produced by Martin Scorsese and Steven Zaillian, the film stars Benedict Cumberbatch as Edison, Michael Shannon as Westinghouse, Nicholas Hoult as Nikola Tesla, and Tom Holland as Samuel Insull, alongside Katherine Waterston, Tuppence Middleton, Matthew Macfadyen and Damien Molony.

Announced in May 2012, Gomez-Rejon was confirmed in September 2015. Cumberbatch, Shannon, and Hoult joined the cast by October 2016, and filming began in England that December. The film premiered at the Toronto International Film Festival on September 9, 2017.

Originally to be distributed by The Weinstein Company, the film was shelved and sold in November 2017 following the sexual abuse allegations made against Harvey Weinstein. It was eventually bought by Weinstein Company successor Lantern Entertainment, which then sold domestic distribution rights to 101 Studios. After discovering a final cut privilege clause in Scorsese's contract, Gomez-Rejon convinced him to allow for reshoots and to trim ten minutes off the original version's runtime, resulting in the film that was eventually released into theaters. The film was released in the United States on October 25, 2019. The film received generally mixed reviews, with praise towards the cast's performances and the intriguing story, but with criticism towards the overall execution.

== Plot ==
In 1880, Thomas Edison has unveiled his electric lightbulb. He plans to distribute power to American neighborhoods using Direct Current (DC), which is cheaper and cleaner than gaslight, but is limited in range and needs an expensive wiring infrastructure. George Westinghouse, a successful business man and inventor himself, wishes to learn more, and invites Edison to dinner. After being snubbed by Edison, Westinghouse sets out to prove alternating current (AC) is the better technology, as it can work over greater distances and at significantly lower cost. Edison and Westinghouse compete to get cities across the United States to use their system. Westinghouse does an AC demonstration at Great Barrington in March 1886.

Inventor Nikola Tesla arrives in the United States and begins working with Edison, but is disappointed by Edison's unwillingness to reconsider his ideas and to fulfill what Tesla thought was a financial promise which Edison passes off as just a joke. Tesla then leaves Edison's team. Edison fiercely guards his patents and sues Westinghouse.

Edison suggests that AC is dangerous and engages in a publicity war, while Westinghouse stands behind its technical merits. As Edison struggles to find ways to make DC more affordable, Westinghouse attempts to get the high-voltage AC system to work with motors. Edison's wife dies, and Westinghouse is also struck by personal tragedy when his friend Franklin Pope dies in an electrical accident. Both face significant financial risk. To generate funds Edison commercially sells his speaking machine "The Phonograph". To damage the reputation of AC, Edison shows that it easily electrocutes animals, and secretly works to help the creators of the electric chair, despite his previous objections to manufacturing weapons or other machines of death. The first person to die by electrocution is William Kemmler, and newspapers label the event as "Far Worse Than Hanging". Westinghouse discovers Edison's involvement and reveals it to the press.

After an unsuccessful attempt to strike out on his own, Tesla is approached by Westinghouse to work together, and build a practical AC motor. Edison is increasingly marginalized and J. P. Morgan merges Edison Electric into General Electric. The competing systems come to a head as they both put forward proposals to illuminate the 1893 World's Columbian Exposition in Chicago. Samuel Insull presents the bid on behalf of Edison, and Westinghouse presents his competing bid. The fair is abundantly lit, and Westinghouse is successful. At the fair Westinghouse and Edison meet briefly. Edison discusses what it was like to achieve a great invention, and suggests that his next invention (motion pictures) could be so incredible that people might forget his name was ever associated with electricity.

== Cast ==
- Benedict Cumberbatch as Thomas Edison
- Michael Shannon as George Westinghouse
- Nicholas Hoult as Nikola Tesla
- Katherine Waterston as Marguerite Erskine Walker
- Tom Holland as Samuel Insull
- Simon Manyonda as Lewis Latimer
- Stanley Townsend as Franklin Pope
- Tuppence Middleton as Mary Stilwell Edison
- Matthew Macfadyen as J. P. Morgan
- Conor MacNeill as William Kemmler
- Damien Molony as Bourke Cockran
- John Schwab as Rudolph Young
- Louis Ashbourne Serkis as Older Dash
- Corey Johnson as Chester A. Arthur

== Production ==
Michael Mitnick began writing the script for The Current War in 2008, basing it on the real life "war of the currents" AC/DC conflict between Edison and Westinghouse. The screenplay is the conclusive result of sixty drafts, a ten-year writing process, first as a musical and finally as a film. In 2011 Mitnick's screenplay made the Black List, an industry survey of "most liked" screenplays not yet produced. On May 3, 2012, it was reported that Timur Bekmambetov's company, Bazelevs, had acquired the rights to Mitnick's screenplay. Bekmambetov was set to direct. On March 31, 2014, it was reported that Ben Stiller was in negotiations to direct the film. As of September 24, 2015, Benedict Cumberbatch and Jake Gyllenhaal were in talks to play Thomas Edison and George Westinghouse, respectively, with Alfonso Gomez-Rejon (Me and Earl and the Dying Girl) eyed to direct the film. Sacha Baron Cohen was also briefly linked to the role of Edison. On September 29, 2016, Michael Shannon was cast as Westinghouse, and on October 4, Nicholas Hoult was cast as Nikola Tesla. In November 2016, Katherine Waterston and Tom Holland joined the cast. The following month, Tuppence Middleton and Matthew Macfadyen were cast.

Principal photography began on December 18, 2016, and took place in London and the surrounding areas, as well as Rothbury, Northumberland, where Cragside House was used as a location. Filming also took place at Brighton Pavilion. Home Farm in Swale, Kent, England was used as the exterior of Edison's residence.

The film was submitted to the Toronto International Film Festival before post-production was completed, and was subsequently rushed in order to make the late-September 2017 premiere date. Following the generally unfavorable reception towards the film, director Gomez-Rejon, who had voiced the film was not ready to be seen, began working on trimming the runtime for the planned November 2017 theatrical release. After the sexual abuse allegations against Weinstein came to light, work on the film ceased as The Weinstein Company would eventually sell off the rights. Thanks to a clause in executive producer Martin Scorsese's contract, he had to approve all final cuts of the film, which resulted in Gomez-Rejon's being able to raise $1 million to complete post-production, as well as do one day of reshoots in England with Cumberbatch, Middleton and Hoult, rounding out their characters.

=== Music ===
The film's score was originally written by the composer duo of Dustin O'Halloran and Volker Bertelmann (Hauschka) for the cut that was shown at TIFF in 2017. However, this score was replaced entirely in 2019 for Gomez-Rejon's director's cut by a new score written by the composer duo of Danny Bensi and Saunder Jurriaans, with additional music by Chase Deso. Neither score has yet received a soundtrack album release.

The soundtrack for the director's cut also includes two movements from Max Richter's Recomposed by Max Richter: Vivaldi – The Four Seasons.

== Release ==
The film was originally scheduled to be released by The Weinstein Company on December 22, 2017, and then rescheduled for November 24, 2017. It had its world premiere at the Toronto International Film Festival on September 9, 2017. It was pulled from release following the sexual abuse allegations that arose against Harvey Weinstein, then co-head of the company. Weinstein said that he was involved in the re-editing of the film when it was made known that the allegations would be revealed.

In October 2018, Lantern Entertainment, which acquired The Weinstein Company's assets through its bankruptcy, and 13 Films, an international distribution and finance company, struck a deal to co-distribute the film internationally.

In April 2019, it was announced 101 Studios had acquired distribution rights to the film for $3 million, and committed to a wide release. Unlike the other Harvey Weinstein's re-editing of the films, director Gomez-Rejon said since the Toronto premiere he had added five additional scenes and trimmed ten minutes from the runtime. It was released on July 26, 2019, in the UK and October 25, 2019, in the US, after being previously scheduled for October 4. The theatrical release included the subtitle "The Director's Cut" in all countries but the UK.

=== Home media ===
The film was first released on DVD, Blu-ray and digital download in the UK by Entertainment in Video on November 18, 2019. In the United States, Universal Pictures Home Entertainment released the film for digital download on March 17, 2020, and later on DVD and Blu-ray on March 31, 2020.

== Reception ==
=== Box office ===
The Current War grossed $6 million in the United States and Canada, and $6.3 million in other territories, for a worldwide total of $12.3 million, against a production budget of $30 million.

In the United States and Canada, The Current War was released alongside Black and Blue and Countdown, and was projected to gross around $3 million from 1,020 theaters in its opening weekend. It made $947,000 on its first day and went on to debut to $2.7 million, finishing ninth at the box office, although it was noted that it was "a miracle that this Alfonso Gomez-Rejon-directed movie made its way to the big screen and wasn't jettisoned to streaming, or unseen forever".

=== Critical response ===
==== Original release ====
On review aggregator Rotten Tomatoes, the version of the film screened at Toronto International Film Festival has an approval rating of 33% based on 57 reviews, with an average rating of 4.8/10. The website's critical consensus reads, "The Current War is powered by an outstanding cast and an intriguing, history-inspired story, which makes this drama's low wattage all the more shocking." On Metacritic, the film has a weighted average score of 42 out of 100, based on 10 critics, indicating "mixed or average reviews"

Reviewing the film after its 2017 premiere, David Rooney for The Hollywood Reporter wrote, "For all its aggressive energy, The Current War is an uninvolving bore, making it unlikely to measure up as the kind of Oscar-baity prestige entry The Weinstein Co. obviously had in mind." Also reviewing the original cut, Andrew Barker of Variety called the film "flashy but unilluminating" and saying that "so little of The Current War's hustle and bustle serves much of a concrete purpose... The Current War feels like one of those earlier experiments – temporary flash providing too little illumination."

Peter Bradshaw of The Guardian gave the film 3 out of 5 stars and wrote, "This [is] a watchably stylised period film, with interesting visual setpieces and faces looming up at us out of intricately contrived backgrounds." He concluded that the film "is illuminating – but perhaps not quite as much as it could have been." Dan Jolin of Empire magazine called the film a "stylish portrayal of a literal power struggle based on truly interesting historical figures and events. But it tries to take in too much in too little time, when all it needed was to centre on Edison and Westinghouse."

==== Director's Cut ====
On Rotten Tomatoes, the Director's Cut version of the film has an approval rating of 61% based on 107 reviews, with an average rating of 6.39/10. The website's critics consensus reads, "If it lacks the powerful voltage that its impressive cast suggests, The Current War: Director's Cut represents a significant improvement over previous versions." On Metacritic, the film has a weighted average score of 55 out of 100, based on 24 critics, indicating "mixed or average reviews". Audiences polled by CinemaScore gave the film an average grade of "B" on an A+ to F scale, while those surveyed by PostTrak gave it an overall positive score of 81%.

Michael Phillips, writing for the Chicago Tribune, gave the film 2.5 out of 4 stars, writing, "I never saw the earlier version [of the film]. This one remains a bit of a mess but a pretty interesting one, as well as one of the few films this year deserving (in both admirable and dissatisfying ways) of the adjective 'instructive.'"
