= The Weinstein Company =

American independent film production and distribution company (2005–2018)

The Weinstein Company, LLC
- Type: Private
- Industry: Film
- Predecessor: Miramax (1979–2005)
- Founded: March 10, 2005; 21 years ago
- Founders: Bob Weinstein; Harvey Weinstein
- Defunct: July 16, 2018; 8 years ago
- Fate: Chapter 11 bankruptcy Liquidation
- Successors: Studio: Lantern Entertainment; Library: Lionsgate (majority); Spyglass Media Group (minority)
- Headquarters: 99 Hudson Street, New York City, New York, US
- Products: Motion pictures
- Owners: Bob Weinstein (2005–2018); Harvey Weinstein (2005–2017)
- Number of employees: 150 (2018)
- Subsidiaries: The Weinstein Company Home Entertainment; Dimension Films; Dimension Home Entertainment (post-2005 titles only); Dimension Extreme; Dimension Television; Weinstein Books; The Weinstein Company Television; Dragon Dynasty; Mizchief; TWC-Dimension; RADiUS-TWC; The Miriam Collection
- Website: https://www.weinsteinco.com

The Weinstein Company, LLC (usually credited or abbreviated as TWC) was an American independent film production and distribution company, which was founded in New York City by Bob and Harvey Weinstein on March 10, 2005. TWC was one of the largest mini-major film studios in North America. However, the firing of Harvey Weinstein following allegations of sexual harassment and rape against him, as well as financial troubles that followed, led to the company's decline. The studio eventually declared bankruptcy in February 2018, with independent studio Lantern Entertainment acquiring a majority of its film library and assets. Co-founder and chief executive Bob Weinstein previously owned a small stake in the company.

The company fired joint founder and chief executive Harvey Weinstein in October 2017, after more than 100 women accused him of sexual harassment, abuse, assault, and rape.

On February 26, 2018, the Weinstein Company announced in a statement that it would declare bankruptcy following the collapse of a buyout deal with an investor group led by Maria Contreras-Sweet. However, the TWC board and the investor group confirmed on March 1, 2018, that they had reached a deal in which TWC would sell all of its assets for US$500 million. On March 6, 2018, the acquisition deal collapsed again after the studio had an extra debt of US$50 million revealed. The company filed for Chapter 11 bankruptcy on March 19, 2018. The company filed for liquidation, and on May 1, 2018, Lantern Capital emerged as the winner of the studio's bankruptcy auction and liquidation sale.

== History ==
=== Early years ===
The Weinstein Company was founded on March 10, 2005, and officially launched that October, following the departure of Harvey and Bob Weinstein from Miramax Films, which they had co-founded in 1979, and sold to the Walt Disney Company on June 30, 1993. The Weinsteins retained ownership of the Dimension Films label. Their first releases in 2005 included the dramatic thriller Derailed (starring Jennifer Aniston, Vincent Cassel and Clive Owen), the offbeat comedy-drama Transamerica (starring Felicity Huffman) the animated family film Hoodwinked, the World War II–era comedy-drama Mrs Henderson Presents (starring Judi Dench and Bob Hoskins), and the caper comedy The Matador (starring Pierce Brosnan and Greg Kinnear).

In February 2006, TWC announced a distribution pact with Metro-Goldwyn-Mayer (MGM). MGM distributed the product domestically in theatres, while TWC retained long-term ownership of their product. On July 13, 2006, the Weinsteins and Robert L. Johnson announced the creation of a joint venture studio titled Our Stories Films, which distributed African-American-oriented films. On November 17, 2006, TWC announced a three-year deal with Blockbuster Video to give Blockbuster exclusive rights for rentals starting on January 1, 2007. However, under the First Sale Doctrine of United States copyright law, other rental companies are able to rent copies of the company's movies purchased at retail.

TWC is the co-producer, along with Miramax, of the Lifetime reality series Project Runway, which for its first five seasons aired on Bravo. The series won a Peabody Award in 2007. On May 23, 2007, TWC announced the launch of three new direct-to-video labels: the Miriam Collection, Kaleidoscope TWC, and Dimension Extreme.

On February 8, 2008, TWC launched a distributor, Third Rail Releasing, that released films aimed mainly at the home video market. On September 25, 2008, TWC ended its three-year distribution pact with MGM three months before the December 31 end date. This happened in part because TWC had struck a television output deal with Showtime, though not through MGM's output deal with them. During the span of their pact, TWC paid for marketing and prints, while MGM received a distribution fee for booking theatres.

=== Financial restructuring ===
On June 5, 2009, TWC announced the hiring of a financial adviser to restructure the finances of the company. After July 2009, many layoffs occurred at TWC, and the release dates of some films were pushed back. On September 14, 2009, TWC sold its stake in Genius Products, which served as TWC's home video distributor from 2006 to 2009. Genius, however, had announced to exit the home video distribution business and the DVD rights that were distributed by Genius were sold to Vivendi Entertainment. TWC also struck a deal with Vivendi. The same year, it won a Peabody Award for The No. 1 Ladies' Detective Agency.

On January 13, 2010, TWC announced more layoffs at the company after the box office failure of Nine. On February 21, 2010, TWC made a deal with Sony Pictures Home Entertainment releasing the DVDs through Sony Pictures Worldwide Acquisitions Group. Bob and Harvey Weinstein attempted to buy back Miramax Films from Disney in 2010, but the attempt was unsuccessful.

An ownership interest in TWC's library, at that point consisting of 200 titles, was sold off to Goldman Sachs and Assured Guaranty in 2010. The sale freed TWC from bankruptcy, and Goldman Sachs' stake in the library was purchased by AMC Networks in 2015. According to Deadline Hollywood: "The library will revert to the Weinstein Company itself when the remaining debt has been paid off by the films in question."

On January 4, 2011, TWC agreed to acquire a 25% stake in Starz Media. Because of this, Starz Media subsidiary Anchor Bay Entertainment became the home video distributor for all TWC films. On February 3, 2011, the Weinsteins extracted a $75 million consolation prize from their former parent company, Disney, thus improving their filmmaking careers. As a result, Disney handed over its 50% stake in Project Runway, and reduced its share in four jointly owned films, including Scary Movie and Spy Kids, from 50% to 5%. On February 27, 2011, TWC-distributed film The King's Speech brought to the company their first Academy Award for Best Picture at the 83rd Academy Awards, after the brothers' last Best Picture Oscar winner Chicago had won in 2002 when Bob and Harvey Weinstein were at Miramax Films, controlled by then corporate owner Disney. Their previous Best Picture nominees for TWC were 2008's The Reader and 2009's Inglourious Basterds, the latter film a co-production with Universal Pictures and A Band Apart. On March 25, 2011, the company formed a video game division named TWC Games. TWC Games formed a strategic consultancy with Beefy Media, a video game production company, to foster relationships with publishers and create high-quality games.

On February 26, 2012, after TWC's purchase of the rights to release Michel Hazanavicius' The Artist in the United States, which won the prestigious Best Actor Award at the Cannes Film Festival for Jean Dujardin, The Artist won five Academy Awards, including Best Picture. This was the second consecutive Oscar for Best Picture awarded to the Weinstein Company. The last independent mini-major to win back-to-back Oscars for Best Picture was Orion Pictures for their films Dances with Wolves in 1990 and The Silence of the Lambs in 1991.

In August 2012, Mark Gooder, then CEO of the Mel Gibson-Bruce Davey company Icon Productions, was appointed president of acquisitions and Australian operations for TWC. In this role he would be responsible for bringing in projects from scripts through finished films, and as part of the role would attend film markets and festivals.

TWC distributed films on multiple formats (including video-on-demand) through its Radius-TWC brand. On September 13, 2013, Bob and Harvey Weinstein launched the TWC-Dimension label to distribute projects of mutual interest They first released the TWC-Dimension label on Paddington on January 16, 2015.

On November 4, 2013, TWC announced they had picked up U.S. distribution rights to the British drama series Peaky Blinders from Endemol.

On December 16, 2013, Miramax and TWC entered a 20-year joint-venture agreement to develop and produce films, television series, and stage shows. The deal would allow the Weinsteins to exploit the 700-film Miramax library. Sequels to Rounders and Shakespeare in Love were among the films being developed under this new deal, and series based on Good Will Hunting and Flirting with Disaster were being planned as well. Other developments included a Noah Hawley-written film titled The Alibi, and an adaptation of Liz Jensen's novel The 9th Life of Louis Drax, that late filmmakers Anthony Minghella and Sydney Pollack intended to make. Miramax would put up the financing and handle international sales while the Weinstein Company would develop the projects and distribute the titles domestically.

On May 7, 2014, TWC announced a multi-year, multi-picture co-financing deal with Worldview Entertainment. However, Worldview only invested in the period drama Tulip Fever due to the departure of CEO Christopher Woodrow.

In April 2015, the Weinstein Company was closing in on a deal to sell its television division to British network ITV for $950 million, but the deal was grounded in May. That same year, the company announced that around 40–50 layoffs would occur due to the box office failure of the comedy-drama Burnt among other factors. Shortly after, TWC announced they would no longer release the normal 18 films per year; instead, the company would release 8–10 films per year and would make fewer acquisitions at film festivals.

On July 31, 2015, TWC COO and president David Glasser briefly left the company amid a string of company exits, but then in September, he rejoined the company and planned to stay as its COO and president until 2018. Harvey Weinstein also openly expressed interest in reacquiring Miramax and merging the film and television libraries of both companies when the latter went up for sale in July. On February 23, 2016, TWC decided to put its film library of 520 titles as well as a majority stake in its television division up for sale, and later signed investment banks Moelis & Company and Thomas Dey's ACF Investment Bank to handle the television sale (which was resumed nine months after the failed talks with ITV) by looking for strategic investors. Meanwhile, in March, Miramax had been acquired by BeIN Media Group, but in a later July interview, however, Weinstein said that he was still interested in merging TWC with Miramax and combining the two companies' libraries in order to build a larger film library, even after the BeIN acquisition. On June 21, 2016, James L. Dolan exited TWC's board of directors and was replaced by hedge fund billionaire and Milwaukee Bucks co-owner Marc Lasry. Later, on August 1, Opus Bank's media and entertainment banking division funded a $400 million credit facility into TWC.

On August 18, 2017, TWC launched Mizchief, a film label dedicated to producing animated films. When Harvey Weinstein, co-founder of TWC, was explaining the origin of the name of Mizchief, he said that it was based on how one of his kids pronounced the word, "Mischief". The only film to be released under the label was the French-Canadian animated film Leap!, released on August 25, 2017.

=== Sexual abuse allegations against Harvey Weinstein ===
On October 5, 2017, The New York Times reported that dozens of women, including more than 60 women in the film industry, had accused Harvey Weinstein of sexual harassment, sexual assault or rape.

On October 6, three of the company's nine members of the board of directors (including Lasry) resigned after the allegations were published. Harvey Weinstein also announced that he would take an indefinite leave of absence. On October 7, Paul Tudor Jones became the fourth member of the company's board of directors to resign.

On October 8, TWC announced that Weinstein had been fired. Soon after, TWC executives announced that Harvey Weinstein will not receive credit on upcoming releases, and it may consider renaming the company. On October 12, board of directors member Richard Koenigsberg, who was one of the four signatories of a board of directors statement defending Weinstein, resigned from the company as well.

=== Sale efforts, bankruptcy and liquidation ===
Bob Weinstein stated on October 13 that media reports that his brother's sexual misconduct scandal had forced the company to explore either a sale or shutting down operations were inaccurate. Bob released an emailed statement claiming "our banks, partners and shareholders are fully supportive of our company and it is untrue that the company or board is exploring a sale or shutdown of the company" and that "business is continuing as usual as the company moves ahead." This was contradicted by TWC president and COO David Glasser and a spokesman for company investor Goldman Sachs. Glasser and the other two remaining members of the company's board of directors also did not join Bob in signing this statement either.

On October 17, The Mist producer Amanda Segel accused Bob Weinstein of sexual harassment. His lawyer Bert Fields has denied the accusations.

Bert Fields and colleague Charles Shephard petitioned a court to leave a rights dispute in which Greenberg Glusker Fields was representing the Weinstein Company due to unpaid bills on December 14, 2017. The firm underscored that it is not involved in the ongoing sexual scandals.

"TWC has failed to pay Greenberg Glusker for its legal services in this matter and has stated that it will be unable to pay for its services as the cases [sic] progresses," writes Shephard in a Wednesday filing. The attorneys also note that TWC has been a Greenberg Glusker client for a long time. So, when the firm was asked to handle this matter, it agreed – even though, at that time, TWC already owed the firm substantial money for prior services.

"Because of the manner in which plaintiff was pursuing the case, because of the size of Greenberg Glusker's receivable, and because of some new and significant issues unrelated to this litigation which had arisen and with which TWC was required to deal (issues that have received a lot of national press and issues which do not involve Greenberg Glusker in any way, and in which Greenberg Glusker played no role whatsoever), Greenberg Glusker became concerned about being paid for its services," states the filing.

Bob Weinstein told Greenberg Glusker TWC would make a substantial payment on November 20, but it never came, according to the filing, and TWC executive vice president Sarah Sobel later told the firm TWC wouldn't be able to pay.

Bert Fields and several other attorneys at the Greenberg Glusker Fields law firm represented the Weinstein Company from 2005 to December 2017.

Reuters reported on October 16, 2017 that TWC had entered talks with private equity firm Colony Capital for the sale of its assets. On November 7, 2017, Colony Capital pulled out of acquiring the Weinstein Company. Other persons and companies that had expressed interest in acquiring TWC included rapper Jay-Z, Yucaipa Companies, Viacom, Lionsgate (the current home video distributor of TWC and Miramax which ended up buying a 20% stake of Spyglass Media Group in July 2021 including the Weinstein Company films), Metro-Goldwyn-Mayer (the former U.S theatrical distributor of TWC), A&E Networks, Administrator of the Small Business Administration Maria Contreras-Sweet, Killer Content, Shamrock Holdings, Vine Alternative Investments, Anchorage Capital Group, MSD Capital, beIN Media Group (the current co-owner of Miramax), Sony Pictures Television, and Versa. Contreras-Sweet had proposed turning TWC into a studio run by women, while Killer Content would donate the studio's profits to assault victims. If anyone acquired the Weinstein Company, the studio would change its name, and Bob Weinstein agreed to leave the company; he was expected to retain the Dimension Films label. All the interested parties had to submit their first-round bids by December 20, 2017. On January 4, 2018, the Weinstein Company narrowed its bids down to six parties, with a sales price of below $500 million. The studio's owners would not receive any cash from the sale.

As of November 8, 2017, the Weinstein Company had a debt load of $520 million, including $220 million from its film and television credit facilities, $150 million from production loans, $50 million in corporate debt and $100 million owed to performers. The studio expected to find a buyer without declaring for Chapter 11 bankruptcy, against the expectations of most of the interested parties. After it appeared that talks collapsed, the company announced it would file for bankruptcy. However, after continued negotiations in which New York Attorney General Eric Schneiderman played a role, the TWC board reached a deal in which TWC sold all of its assets for $500 million; after the sales were finalized, the company was renamed and got a new board of directors of which a majority were women. However, after an additional $50 million in debt was revealed, the deal collapsed again.

In order to raise funds, TWC has sold the rights to three of its films, Paddington 2, In the Heights, and The Six Billion Dollar Man, to Warner Bros. Pictures and was removed from the production of Artemis Fowl and television shows such as The Graham Norton Show, Peaky Blinders, Yellowstone and Waco with its production company and producer removed from Disney and the film as a result of the allegations. On January 19, 2018, TWC indefinitely postponed the releases of some of their films and upcoming projects (e.g. The Current War, The War with Grandpa, The Upside, Hampstead, Mary Magdalene, Scream 5 (which later changed its name to Scream), Once Upon a Time in Hollywood, Polaroid, The Boys in the Boat and Hotel Mumbai). STX Entertainment later acquired the distribution rights to The Upside, while Scream 5 was sold to Paramount Pictures, Hotel Mumbai was sold to Bleecker Street, The Current War and The War with Grandpa were sold to 101 Studios, Once Upon a Time in Hollywood was sold to Columbia Pictures, Polaroid was sold to Vertical Entertainment, The Boys in the Boat was sold to Metro-Goldwyn-Mayer and Hampstead and Mary Magdalene were sold to IFC Films.

As of February 2018, several companies had sued TWC, including American Express ($1.4 million), chocolatier Lindt & Sprüngli ($133,333), and Canadian film distributor Entertainment One ($7.2 million for Paddington 2), On March 20, 2018, shortly after the studio filed for Chapter 11 protection, the Bankruptcy Court in Delaware published a 394-page list of creditors owed money from TWC; including the estate of rock musician David Bowie, film director Michael Bay, and former First Daughter of the United States Malia Obama. Several Russian studios, including Central Partnership, Paradiz and Volga, and Timur Bekmambetov's Bazelevs Company, were also owed money from the studio. On January 7, 2019, Lantern Entertainment said that it was not responsible for TWC's unpaid debts.

On March 19, 2018, the Weinstein Company announced that it had declared bankruptcy, and is considering a $310 million stalking horse offer with Lantern Capital. The company's bankruptcy auction began on May 4, 2018. Twenty-three bidders had expressed interest in buying certain assets from the studio. On April 27, Miramax and Lantern emerged as the frontrunners in the company's bankruptcy sale.

On June 22, 2018, Lantern lowered its acquisition price to $287 million. On July 9, 2018, several actors, directors, producers and writers protested Lantern's acquisition, asking a U.S. Bankruptcy Court judge not to approve the purchase price for TWC's assets without first extracting a guarantee of payment to the creditors who are still owed money by the studio.

On July 16, 2018, the bankruptcy judge agreed to convert the bankruptcy into a Chapter 7 bankruptcy with an appointed trustee to oversee liquidation, and TWC's assets were sold to the Dallas-based equity firm Lantern Capital Partners for $289 million. A newly formed studio, Lantern Entertainment, assumed the rights to TWC's 277-film library. Co-presidents Andy Mitchell and Milos Brajovic took charge of a company that dropped to 50 employees from 170 due to departures and layoffs. A trio of film experts were expected to help the co-presidents hire an experienced film CEO.

As of July 11, 2018, Netflix terminated its output contract with the Weinstein Company and would no longer accept deliveries or make payments to the studio. This affected the release schedule for the third season of the MTV series Scream (produced by Dimension Television, and billed as a Netflix Original internationally). On June 24, 2019, it was announced that the rebooted Scream series would be moving to VH1 ahead of the premiere of the third season. The third season premiered on July 8, 2019. Two other Weinstein series; Peaky Blinders and Spy Kids: Mission Critical; remained available for streaming. In February 2019, Lantern was reported to be reaching a settlement with The Walt Disney Company, regarding several films that Lantern did not acquire (including Scream 4 and The Matador). On July 15, 2019, Spyglass settled two major claims, including $11 million for Viacom regarding the television series Scream and the film Sin City 2 (which Lantern did not acquire).

=== Civil rights investigation ===
On October 23, 2017, New York Attorney General Eric Schneiderman launched a civil rights investigation into whether the Weinstein Company violated state civil rights and New York City human rights laws in its handling of sexual harassment complaints and other types of discrimination against employees. The attorney general's Civil Rights Bureau sent the company a subpoena seeking a long list of documents, including any documents and communications related to private out-of-court settlements struck with accusers.

A group of Weinstein Company employees published a public statement in The New Yorker asking to be released from their signed non-disclosure agreements, which prohibit them from speaking out about their time at the company. In their statement, they wrote, "We all knew that we were working for a man with an infamous temper. We did not know we were working for a serial sexual predator." They asked the company to lift their NDAs so they could "speak openly, and get to the origins of what happened here, and how."

On February 11, 2018, Schneiderman filed a civil rights lawsuit against the company, Harvey and Bob Weinstein, just shortly before an anticipated announcement that the company would be purchased by an investor group led by Maria Contreras-Sweet. In the lawsuit, the company and both Weinsteins were accused of violating civil rights and gender discrimination laws, stating that it had "repeatedly and persistently treated female employees less well than male-employees through gender-based hostile workplace harassment, quid pro quo harassment, and discrimination" by maintaining "a group of female employees whose primary job it was to accompany HW (sic) to events and to facilitate HW's sexual conquests". In addition, the lawsuit includes information that the company's Chief Operating Officer communicated with the Human Resources Director about complaints where settlements and non-disclosure agreements were needed, with the H.R. Director not being involved in any investigation or resolution process "on more than one occasion", and details on verbal abuse and threats by Harvey Weinstein that he would (in substance) kill employees, directly or indirectly via claims that he "had connections to the Secret Service who could solve problems for him".

In filing the lawsuit, Schneiderman sought to force the company to address several points: to give up non-disclosure agreements with past employees, provide better protection for employees "who would be reporting to some of the same managers" since most of the existing senior managers would remain in place, including David Glasser, current COO of the company, and insufficient funds to compensate alleged victims that would file suits. The investment group has allocated $50 million in the deal for compensation, which is in addition to the company's insurance policies. Other non-disclosure agreements were in effect between the company and the investment group, which prevented members of the group from talking to the Attorney General until February 10, though Bob Weinstein denied this. People "close to the sale" derided the timing of the filing "as an effort to score political points and grab media attention", and could lead to the sale falling through, forcing the company into bankruptcy and delaying compensation for victims. The investment group is said to meet with the Attorney General's office within a few days, with the decision whether to continue or abandon the bid for the company on hold until then.

On February 16, 2018, the Weinstein Company fired President and COO David Glasser "for cause". Glasser filed a counter-suit on February 20 against the company and remaining board members, stating that no reasons other than "for cause" were given for the firing, which was described as "nothing more than a desperate attempt to deflect attention away from the very people who were empowered to halt Harvey Weinstein's abusive behavior".

=== Lantern Entertainment ===
Following the sale of all assets to Lantern Capital subsidiary, Lantern Entertainment, on July 16, 2018, the Weinstein Company was completely shut down along with its website; its last film was the historical drama The Current War on October 25, 2019 in the United States. On November 13, 2018, Lantern acquired full control of three Quentin Tarantino films, Inglourious Basterds, Django Unchained and The Hateful Eight, originally released by the Weinstein Company, for $6.1 million. On July 31, 2018, Lantern Entertainment signed a distribution deal with Lionsgate for the Weinstein Company's library.

On March 13, 2019, Gary Barber and Lantern Entertainment revived Spyglass Media Group with other investors, including WarnerMedia/AT&T's Warner Bros.; Lantern made a majority investment, including licensing their film library, to Spyglass. On March 20, 2020, a federal judge ruled that Spyglass was not responsible for any of TWC's outgoing royalties.

On July 15, 2021, Spyglass sold most of TWC's catalogue and distribution rights to Lionsgate, as part of an acquisition deal in which Lionsgate also purchased a 18.9% equity stake in Spyglass and signed a first-look television deal with the studio.

== Radius-TWC ==
Radius-TWC (or simply Radius; stylized as RADiUS-TWC) is a dormant film label to TWC's division for distribution of multi-platform video-on-demand and theatrical productions. It was launched in 2012, and specialized in niche and independent films rather than those aimed at mainstream audiences. As of 2018, Radius had released about 35 films, including:

- 20 Feet from Stardom
- A Lego Brickumentary
- All the Boys Love Mandy Lane
- Bachelorette
- Butter
- Citizenfour
- Fed Up
- Horns
- It Follows
- The Last Five Years
- Lovelace
- Man of Tai Chi
- Only God Forgives
- Snowpiercer

== Weinstein Books ==
A successor of Miramax Books founded by Bob and Harvey Weinstein in 2001, the imprint was founded in 2009 as Weinstein Books, a joint publishing venture between the Weinstein Company and the Perseus Books Group, published a range of general interest fiction, both literary and commercial, along with media-driven non-fiction and young adult titles.

Since 2012, Weinstein Books was under the creative management of Publishing Director Georgina Levitt and Editorial Director Amanda Murray. Publicity Director Kathleen Schmidt joined Weinstein Books in 2013. Weinstein Books worked in collaboration with the Weinstein Company to create book tie-ins to films such as My Week With Marilyn, Bully by Lee Hirsch and Cynthia Lee and One Chance by Paul Potts.

On October 12, 2017, in response to the allegations, Hachette Book Group (which had purchased Perseus's publishing arm in April 2016) announced the imprint would immediately be shuttered, with its titles and authors moving directly to Hachette Books.

== Mizchief (2008–2017) ==
Originally launched as Kaleidoscope-TWC as the studio's family label, its logo would not be used until 2013's Escape From Planet Earth and was last used on 2015/2016's US release of Underdogs, in 2017, with the release of Leap!, it was replaced with Mizchief for children's animated features allowing The Weinstein Company to make its own family TV shows, Mizchief was last used on The Guardian Brothers.

Mizchief
- Type: Private
- Industry: Film
- Predecessor: Kaleidoscope-TWC (2013–2017)
- Founded: August 20, 2017; 9 years ago
- Founder: Harvey Weinstein
- Defunct: July 16, 2018; 8 years ago
- Fate: Chapter 11 bankruptcy Liquidation
- Successors: Studio: Lantern Entertainment; Library: Lionsgate; Spyglass Media Group
- Headquarters: 99 Hudson Street, New York City, New York, US
- Products: Animation

== International distributors ==
- Canada:
  - Alliance Atlantis (2005–2008)
  - Alliance Films (2008–2013)
  - Entertainment One (2013–2018)
- United Kingdom:
  - Momentum Pictures (now Entertainment One) (2006–2011)
  - Optimum Releasing (now known as StudioCanal UK) (2007–2017 for some films)
  - Entertainment Film Distributors (2008–2018) (main contractor)
  - Icon Entertainment International (2007–2009)
  - Paramount Pictures (2006–2008)
  - Warner Bros. UK (TMNT and The Nut Job/The Nut Job 2: Nutty by Nature only)
- Australia and New Zealand: Roadshow Entertainment (2006–2018)
- Russia: Forum Film (2010–2018); Central Partnership/A Company (2007–2018)
- Middle East: Italia Film (2009–2018)
- Israel: Forum Film (2009–2018)
- France: SND Films; StudioCanal; Metropolitan Filmexport
- Indonesia: SinemArt; Multivision Plus
- Spain: Diamond Films (2016–2018); Alliance Atlantis (2005–2008), Alliance Films (2008–2013), Entertainment One (2013–2016); DeAPlaneta (2006–2016), Tripictures (2006–2016), Filmax (2006–2016), Wide Pictures (2008–2011), Warner Bros. Pictures España (TMNT, Vicky Cristina Barcelona and Paddington only), Universal Pictures (2006–2015), Paramount Pictures (2011)

== Filmography ==
=== Highest-grossing films ===
Highest-grossing films
Rank	Title	Year	Domestic gross	Notes
1	Django Unchained	2012	$162,805,434	Jointly released with Columbia Pictures internationally.
2	The King's Speech	2010	$138,797,449	
3	Silver Linings Playbook	2012	$132,092,958	
4	Inglourious Basterds	2009	$120,540,719	Jointly released with Universal Pictures internationally.
5	The Butler	2013	$116,632,095	
6	The Imitation Game	2014	$91,125,683	
7	Scary Movie 4	2006	$90,710,620	Released under Dimension Films brand, jointly released with Buena Vista Pictures internationally.
8	Paddington	2015	$76,223,578	Produced in the United Kingdom by StudioCanal
9	1408	2007	$71,985,628	Released under Dimension Films brand, co-distributed by Metro-Goldwyn-Mayer.
10	Escape from Planet Earth	2013	$57,012,977	
