= It's Alive! (TV series) =

- Genre: Variety
- Created by: Kevin Lund
- Written by: Kevin Lund; Ben Joseph; Josh Morris; Franklin Young; Julie Donoahue; Jessica Wright
- Directed by: Kevin Lund; Rick Watts
- Starring: Taulene Ayoub; Jennifer Baxter; Mike Beaver; Shayleen Butler; Haydn Chase; Jeff Colt; Stacey DePass; Dwayne Hill; Eva Preger; Adrian Pryce; Patricia Ribeiro; Jamie Shannon; Tikka Sherman; Ian Sirota; Danny Smith; Robert Tinkler; Scott Yaphe; Franklin Young; Jason Walker; Mark Adam Zeifman
- Composers: Elizabeth Baird; Richard Rodwell
- Country of origin: Canada

Production
- Executive producers: Kevin Lund; Josh Morris; Ian Murray
- Producers: Josh Morris; Kevin Lund; Rick Watts
- Production locations: YTV Studios; Toronto, Ontario
- Editor: Ian Gardner
- Running time: 90 minutes (Season 1); 60 minutes (Seasons 2-3); 30 minutes (Season 4)
- Production company: GRC Productions

Original release
- Network: YTV
- Release: May 14, 1994 – August 10, 1996

Related
- Uh Oh!

It's Alive! is a Canadian children's variety show that aired on YTV between 1994 and 1996. Coined "the least educational show on television", the show mainly consisted of comedy sketches, celebrity interviews, musical performances, game shows, and obstacle challenges. In its original six-episode first season, episodes were 1½ hours long, which also contained an episode of programs including Mighty Morphin Power Rangers, Are You Afraid of the Dark?, and Captain Scarlet and the Mysterons. Starting in the second season, the show was cut back to one hour with the television programs dropped from the show. In the fourth and final season, the show was cut to a half-hour. Most of the sketches and the obstacle courses were shot at various locations in Toronto, while the musical performances, game show segments, and celebrity interviews were done in front of a live studio audience full of children at YTV's studios in Toronto. A unique aspect of the show was the use of product placements including 3DO, Crispers, and Canada Games. The game show, Uh Oh!, which was inspired on a game show parody sketch during its second season, later became a spin-off show after It's Alive! ended in 1996.
