= Peter Lepeniotis =

Canadian animator

- Born: Canada
- Occupations: Animator, film director, screenwriter, producer, storyboard artist
- Years active: 1995–present
- Known for: Toy Story 2 Surly Squirrel; The Nut Job

Peter Lepeniotis is a Canadian animator, film director, screenwriter and producer. He is best known for his 2005 animated short Surly Squirrel. He adapted the short into the full-length feature film, The Nut Job, which Lepeniotis co-wrote and directed. It was released in 2014 by Open Road Films and The Weinstein Company. Due to the film's success at the box office, Lepeniotis and the team at ToonBox Entertainment (the studio that produced Lepeniotis' feature film) greenlit a sequel, The Nut Job 2: Nutty by Nature, which was released in 2017.

== Filmography ==
- Casper (1995) (animator)
- Jumanji (1995) (additional animator, uncredited)
- Toy Story 2 (1999) (animator)
- Fantasia 2000 (1999) (assistant animator)
- Dinosaur (2000) (animator)
- Bless the Child (2000) (visual effects animator)
- Bait (2000) (animator)
- 3-2-1 Penguins! (2002-2003) (animation director)
- VeggieTales: A Snoodle's Tale (2004) (animator)
- Surly Squirrel (2005, short film) (director, producer, and writer)
- Everyone's Hero (2006) (supervising animator)
- Gotta Catch Santa Claus (2008) (director)
- Bolts & Blip (2010, TV) (director)
- Nuts and Robbers (2011, Short Film) (director, story, and storyboard artist)
- The Nut Job (2014) (director, co-writer, story, Adaptation from Short Film Surly Squirrel)
- The Nut Job 2: Nutty by Nature (2017) (based on characters by, Executive Producer, uncredited)
- Gnome Alone (2018) (director)
- PAW Patrol: The Movie (2021) (additional animator, uncredited)
- Zombie Town (2023) (director)
- Jill and Evan's Amazing Jungle Adventure (TBA) (director, co-writer)
- War of Their Worlds (TBA) (director)
