= Tiger Jackson =

Tiger Jackson may refer to:

- Claude Giroux (wrestler), who used the ring name Tiger Jackson
- Tiger Jackson, a character in the Tekken series

== See also ==
- Tigrr Jaxxon, a character in the animated TV series Bolts & Blip
