= The Nut Job 2: Nutty by Nature =

2017 film by Cal Brunker

- Theatrical release poster
- Directed by: Cal Brunker
- Written by: Scott Bindley; Cal Brunker; Bob Barlen
- Based on: Characters by Peter Lepeniotis
- Produced by: Harry Linden; Bob Barlen; Youngki Lee; Jongsoo Kim; Sunghwan Kim; Jonghan Kim; Lili Ma
- Starring: Will Arnett; Maya Rudolph; Bobby Moynihan; Bobby Cannavale; Isabela Moner; Jeff Dunham; Gabriel Iglesias; Jackie Chan; Katherine Heigl
- Edited by: Paul Hunter
- Music by: Heitor Pereira
- Production companies: Open Road Films; ToonBox Entertainment; Gulfstream Pictures; Red Rover International; Shanghai Hoongman
- Distributed by: Open Road Films (United States); The Weinstein Company (International); Warner Bros. Pictures (UK)
- Release date: August 11, 2017
- Running time: 91 minutes
- Countries: United States; Canada; South Korea
- Language: English
- Budget: $40 million
- Box office: $68.7 million

The Nut Job 2: Nutty by Nature is a 2017 animated comedy film directed by Cal Brunker and written by Brunker, Bob Barlen, and Scott Bindley. The sequel to The Nut Job (2014) and based on the characters created by Peter Lepeniotis, it stars the voices of Will Arnett, Maya Rudolph, Bobby Moynihan, Bobby Cannavale, Isabela Moner, Jeff Dunham, Gabriel Iglesias, Jackie Chan, and Katherine Heigl. The film is an American–Canadian–South Korean co-production, produced by Gulfstream Pictures, Redrover International and ToonBox Entertainment, and distributed by Open Road Films in the United States and The Weinstein Company in international, while Warner Bros. Pictures handles the distribution rights in the UK. The story follows Surly Squirrel and his animal friends as they find out that Percival J. Muldoon, the unscrupulous Mayor of Oakton City, plans to bulldoze Liberty Park to make way for an amusement park named Libertyland. They must join forces with Mr. Feng and his mice to save Liberty Park and defeat the mayor.

Following the commercial success of its predecessor, Open Road announced a sequel in January 2014, with a planned January 15, 2016 release date before being pushed back to a May 2017 release and finally August 2017 release. Brunker replaced Lepeniotis as a director, while Brunker, Barlen, and Bindley were brought on board to write the film. Arnett, Rudolph, and the rest of the cast reprised their voice roles, with new additions to the cast including Chan, Moynihan, Cannavale and Stormare. The musical score was composed by Heitor Pereira, replacing Paul Intson from the first film.

The Nut Job 2: Nutty by Nature was released theatrically on August 11, 2017. Like its predecessor, the film was met with negative reviews and grossed less with $68.7 million against a budget of $40 million. A sequel is currently in development.

== Plot ==
Since Norvirus Raccoon's defeat, Surly Squirrel is now loved by Liberty Park's urban wildlife community, who oversees an all-you-can-eat buffet at Maury's Nut Shop (now renamed Nibbler's Nut Shop), but this worries Andie as she has a more hard-working outlook on life than Surly. Mole accidentally blows up the nut shop after he forgets to reduce pressure from the boiler. Andie suggests returning to their roots by foraging for food in Liberty Park as Surly and Buddy fail to find other food-packed places. Defeated, he and Buddy return to the park. Concerned that Liberty Park never makes money, Percival J. Muldoon, the unscrupulous Mayor of Oakton City, decides to turn it into an amusement park named Libertyland. Surly and Andie discover Muldoon's plot, and Surly convinces the animals to sabotage the construction workers' efforts to tear down the park.

Surly's enjoyment is short-lived. Andie attempts to convince the animals to work hard for food, which Surly believes can result in disappointment. When the construction workers' foreman tells Muldoon about the animal attacks, he calls an animal extermination squad led by Gunther. Surly becomes caught in one of Gunther's traps and the animals are pursued by Muldoon's dog Frankie who later falls in love with Precious. Surly and Buddy leave to rescue her while the others find a new park.

While searching for Muldoon's car, Surly and Buddy run afoul of a colony of territorial white mice led by Mr. Feng. They evade the mice and find Muldoon's mansion where they find Precious in the bedroom of Muldoon's bratty daughter Heather. Precious tells Frankie she is uninterested in him, breaking his heart. Surly's recklessness causes Muldoon to shoot Buddy who falls off a balcony and falls unconscious. Andie, Jimmy, Johnny, and Jamie find what seems to be a suitable park, but it turns out to be a golf course that almost gets them killed. The Bruisers have multiple injuries while Andie had to resuscitate Jamie with CPR and even defibrillation with some wires.

Surly, Precious, and Buddy reunite with the others in the nut shop's remains. While mourning Buddy, Surly recounts how they saved each other as kids. Buddy wakes up after Precious licks him. Surly leads the animals in retaking the park from Muldoon during Libertyland's grand opening. Muldoon calls Gunther and his team over to capture them. Surly, the only one left standing, goes to Mr. Feng and his army. While attacking Surly, the latter convinces Feng the animals must work together regardless of whether they are from the city or a park.

Surly and the mice free the other animals and round them up to take back Liberty Park. They overwhelm the humans, destroy all of the rides, and attract the attention of the police. Precious finds Frankie, apologizes, and confesses she does care for him, causing Frankie to fall in love with her again. After the pair make up, Heather tries to convince Gunther to tranquilize them. But due to the interference of Surly, Andie, and Buddy, Gunther shoots Heather, knocking her out while he runs away. Muldoon tries to escape the chaos using a hot air balloon, but Surly and Buddy commandeer a roller coaster to catch up to him. Surly makes it on top of the balloon and he and Muldoon engage in a long battle. Muldoon falls on top of a bouncy house and is attacked by Feng and his colony. Muldoon, Heather, and Gunther are arrested for their crimes and Libertyland is shut down for good.

Several months later, the people help rebuild Liberty Park to its former glory. After the park is rebuilt, Feng and his colony stay and focus on Tai Chi, Precious and Frankie have puppies, and Surly takes Andie on a ride with Precious to rob a nut cart.

In a post-credit scene, Raccoon tries to swim back to the city for his revenge unaware that he is trailed by the sharks.

== Cast ==
- Will Arnett as Surly, a purple squirrel who was at first loathed by the park's animals, but is now considered a hero for defeating Raccoon in the first film and becomes Andie's boyfriend for helping to save them from a dire food shortage that he had unintentionally caused.
  - Justin Felbinger voices a younger Surly.
- Maya Rudolph as Precious, a pug who was formerly owned by bank robbers but is now currently the park animals' loyal friend and protector and falls in love with Frankie. Since the end of the second film, she becomes his wife.
- Jackie Chan as Mr. Feng, the Chinese-accented territorial leader of a gang of white street mice, who hates being called cute due to his small size and big blue eyes.
- Katherine Heigl as Andie, a female compassionate and beautiful red squirrel and Surly's girlfriend.
- Bobby Moynihan as Mayor Percival J. Muldoon, the unscrupulous, spoiled and greedy mayor of Oakton City, a sadistic hunter, and the father of Heather who plans to replace Liberty Park with a faulty amusement park named Libertyland. Muldoon is also known for his cruelty to animals.
- Bobby Cannavale as Frankie, Heather's former pet French Bulldog, who falls in love with Precious. In the end, he becomes her husband.
- Isabela Moner as Heather Muldoon, Mayor Muldoon's equally spoiled and vociferous daughter.
- Jeff Dunham as Mole, a mole who formerly worked for Raccoon and now works with Andie.
- Gabriel Iglesias as Jimmy, a groundhog who is Johnny and Jamie's brother and the leader of the Bruisers (consisting of him and his siblings).
- Sebastian Maniscalco as Johnny, a groundhog who is Jimmy and Jamie's brother. He was previously voiced by Joe Pingue in the first film.
- Peter Stormare as Gunther, a Swedish-accented deranged animal control officer.
- Kari Wahlgren as Jamie, a groundhog, who is Jimmy and Johnny's sister. She was previously voiced by Annick Obonsawin in the first film.
- Robert Tinkler as Redline, a blue mouse whose catchphrase is "We're all gonna die!", later "We're all gonna... live!"
- Julie Lemieux as Li'l Chip, a chipmunk that lives in Liberty Park and additional voices.
- Buddy, Surly's mute rat partner and best friend reappears, but is unvoiced. He was voiced by Robert Tinkler in the first movie.
- Josh Robert Thompson as a Construction Foreman that oversees the construction of Libertyland.
- Dwayne Hill as Sarge (credited as "Police Officer"), a police officer who inspects Liberty Park on opening day. He was previously voiced by Scott McCord in the first film.
- Laraine Newman as Daredevil Chipmunk, a chipmunk with a daredevil personality that lives in Liberty Park.
- Cal Brunker as Charming Chipmunk, a chipmunk with a charming personality that lives in Liberty Park.
- Bob Barlen as Handsome Mouse
- Jess Harnell, Fred Tatasciore, and Andrew Ortenberg as Animal Control Guys, fellow hazmat suit-wearing workers of Gunther who help to round up Surly and the Park Animals.
- Greg Chun and Dave Fennoy as Mr. Feng's Mouse Henchmen, white street mice who have brown eyes and fight like Kung fu masters.

Additional voices by Emma Dale, Jamie Denis, Jonathan Dixon, Lukas Engel, Dave Fennoy, Jess Harnell, Dwayne Hill, Julie Lemieux, Josh Robert Thompson, and Kari Wahlgren.

== Production ==
On January 23, 2014, The Nut Job 2 was announced with a theatrical release date of January 15, 2016. On April 11, 2016, the release date was pushed back to May 19, 2017. Will Arnett, Gabriel Iglesias, Jeff Dunham, Katherine Heigl and Maya Rudolph reprised their roles. On May 25, 2016, Heitor Pereira was hired to score the film. Jackie Chan joined the cast as Mr. Feng in July 2016, and Bobby Moynihan, Bobby Cannavale and Peter Stormare also came on board. In December 2016, the film was pushed back again, to August 18, 2017, and in May 2017, it was moved a week forward to August 11, 2017.

== Release ==
The film was released on August 11, 2017, by Open Road Films. The first trailer for the film was released on January 18, 2017. As with the first film, The Weinstein Company handles international distribution, while Warner Bros. Pictures provides British distribution.

=== Home media ===
The Nut Job 2: Nutty by Nature was released on Digital on October 31, 2017, and on DVD and Blu-ray on November 14, 2017.

=== Marketing ===
The marketing campaign of The Nut Job 2: Nutty by Nature included promotions, such as Carl's Jr, Blue Diamond Almonds, Menchies, National Wildlife Federation, Humane Society of the United States, iFetch, Kika, Homes.com, Frontier Airlines, PB Crave, National Recreation and Park Association, and Pug Nation of Los Angeles, while the TV campaign includes the major networks, and cable outlets such as Cartoon Network, Disney XD, Nickelodeon, USA, TBS, Univision and Telemundo. Open Road also partnered with Nick.com on a custom game, Surly's Coaster Chase, as well as integrations in top mobile games such as Cut the Rope and Angry Birds. Variety reported Open Road spent $19.7 million promoting the film for TV spots.

== Reception ==
=== Box office ===
The Nut Job 2: Nutty by Nature grossed $28.4 million in the United States and Canada and $40.4 million in other territories, for a worldwide total of $68.7 million against a production budget of $40 million.

In the United States and Canada, The Nut Job 2: Nutty by Nature was released alongside Annabelle: Creation and The Glass Castle, and was initially projected to gross $12–14 million from 4,003 theaters in its opening weekend. However, after making just $3 million on its first day (including $330,000 from Thursday previews), expectations were lowered to $8–9 million. It went on to open to $8.3 million, finishing 3rd at the box office and down 68% from the first film's $25.7 million 4-day opening. It currently has the record of the worst opening for a film that opened in over 4,000 theaters (the previous record holder was another animated film, The Emoji Movie, which had an opening of $24.5 million from 4,075 theaters). Amid Amidi of Cartoon Brew says the low opening weekend was attributed to opportune timing. The Nut Job 2: Nutty by Nature completed its theatrical run in the United States and Canada on September 28, 2017.

=== Critical response ===
On the review aggregator website Rotten Tomatoes, the film holds an approval rating of 15% based on 62 reviews, with an average rating of 4.00/10. The site's critical consensus reads, "The Nut Job 2: Nutty by Nature may be a slight improvement over its predecessor, but its frantic animated antics still offer minimal entertainment to all but the least discriminating viewers." On Metacritic, the film has a weighted average score of 36 out of 100 based on 19 reviews, indicating "generally unfavorable reviews". Audiences polled by CinemaScore gave the film an average grade of "B+" on an A+ to F scale, an improvement over the first film's "B".

Owen Gleiberman of Variety wrote: "As an animated entertainment, The Nut Job 2 lacks several key factors: memorable characters, a fun story, jokes that will appeal to adults as well as little kids. But one thing it does not lack is visual momentum."

=== Accolades ===
Maya Rudolph was nominated for Outstanding Voice Performance at the 2018 Black Reel Awards.

== Future ==
In November 2025, it was announced that a third film was in the works.
