= Scott Yaphe =

Canadian actor and comedian (born 1970)

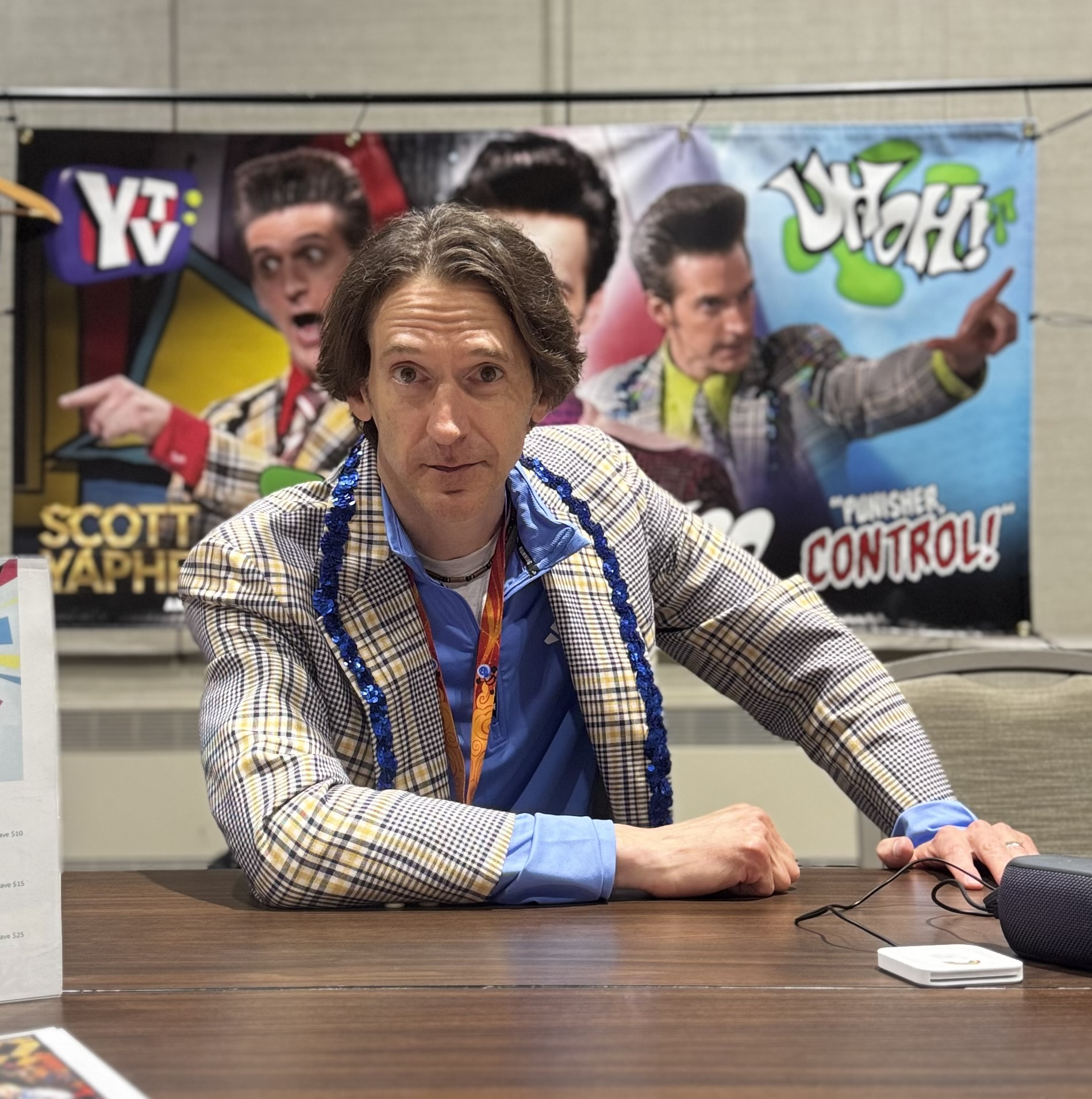
- Yaphe in 2026
- Born: February 16, 1970 (age 56); Montreal, Quebec, Canada
- Occupations: Actor, comedian
- Years active: 1990–present
- Spouse: Jessica Holmes (m. 2002)
- Children: 2

Scott Yaphe (born February 16, 1970) is a Canadian actor and comedian best known as a cast member of the YTV variety show It's Alive! and the host of the game show Uh Oh!

== Early life ==
Yaphe was born in Montreal, Quebec to Phyllis (née Stern) and Allan Yaphe.

== Career ==
In 1994, Yaphe became a cast member in It's Alive!. After It's Alive was cancelled in 1997, Yaphe and a few other It's Alive! regulars, moved over to the game show Uh Oh!, where he became the host by his fictional name, "Wink Yahoo". Wink Yahoo was known for his flashy suit jackets and hairstyle while the show became popular for the way it dropped slime on its young contestants by a masked man called "The Punisher".

After Uh Oh! ended, Yaphe has gone on to voice many radio and television commercials, including the Whiskas Temptations cat treats spot. He was also the promo voice for Rogers Sportsnet, Sun News Network and the fast-talking voice in expedia.ca ads.

Yaphe starred in the films The Tuxedo, Amelia, The Nut Job. He had the recurring roles of Sliver in the second season of Disney XD's Aaron Stone, and as Zafer Griffin in the Cartoon Network live-action series, Unnatural History. He also appeared in Global's police drama Rookie Blue and the FX series The Strain.

== Personal life ==
Yaphe is married to comedian and actress Jessica Holmes and has two children, Alexa and Jordan.
