= Uh Oh! (game show) =

Canadian TV series aired from 1998 to 2003

- Genre: Game show
- Created by: Rick Watts; Frank Young
- Directed by: Rick Watts (1997–2002); Kim Elaschuk (2002–2003)
- Presented by: Scott Yaphe
- Starring: Samantha Cook; Joseph Pierre (1997); Aaron Alexander; Patricia Ribeiro; Shaun Majumder (1997–2001); Ryan Belleville (2001–2003); Christian Hagen; Erin Strimatis; Akua Otupiri (1997–2002); Dawn Cox (2002–2003); Mike Beaver; Sean Loucks
- Narrated by: Dwayne Hill; Mike Nahrgang
- Theme music composer: Richard and Camille Rodwell
- Country of origin: Canada
- Original language: English
- No. of seasons: 6
- No. of episodes: 231

Production
- Executive producers: Peter Moss (1998–2000); Paula Parker (2000–2002); Maryke McEwen (2002–2003)
- Producers: Rick Watts (1997–2002); Sia Petropoulos (1998–2000); Jennifer Codyre (2000–2001); Gillian Pike (2001–2003); Liana Golberg (2002-2003)
- Production locations: Global Television; Toronto, Ontario
- Production companies: GRC Productions (1997–1998); YTV Productions Inc. (1998–2001, 2002-2003); Corus Entertainment (1999-2003); Uh Oh V Productions Inc. (2001-2002)

Original release
- Network: YTV
- Release: August 22, 1997 – April 19, 2003

Related
- It's Alive!

Uh Oh! is a Canadian television game show that was created by Rick Watts (who also served as producer and director of the show's first five seasons) and Frank Young. Following a sneak preview at YTV Psykoblast on August 16, Uh Oh! aired from August 22, 1997, to April 19, 2003, on YTV, and was a spin-off of the popular variety show It's Alive!, which also aired on YTV. Uh Oh! was part of It's Alive's game show segment during its third season, but existed as a parody during its second season. As of 2023, Uh Oh! is the third longest-running show on YTV, behind Hit List and Video & Arcade Top 10, both of which aired for 14 and 15 years respectively. For its entire run, Uh Oh! was taped at Global Television in Toronto, Ontario. The series ended on April 19, 2003.

== Background and premise ==
Uh Oh! was inspired by a game show parody sketch on It's Alive! during its second season, where three contestants were chained up and answered multiple choice questions. If a contestant answered incorrectly, a man known as "The Punisher" would pour slime on them from the rafters. In the third season of It's Alive!, realizing that the game show parody could actually work as a real game show, Uh Oh! debuted as part of the slate of game shows during the show's segment. The game was much shorter than its spin-off, with the game consisting of one round of two spins each. Quickly becoming the most popular game show in the segment, the game was played more frequently than its other games. After It's Alive! ended in 1996, Uh Oh! later became a show of its own, playing with exactly the same rules as when it was originally on It's Alive!, except that there were two rounds, with an additional round between the two rounds called Slime Tour, which was based on the obstacle course segment from It's Alive! involving different teams who were competing against each other in their own competition on location.

The game was played with three colour-based teams that would be battled against each other in each game. The goal of the game was to have more points than the other two teams to take home the grand prize. Teams would consist of two players each and would be either Blue, Green, or Red. Audience members would also pick sides and wear clothes of the colour they supported. Each team member would either spin the wheel for half of the game or participate in whichever activity the wheel lands on. The team members would participate in games that would nearly always involve goo and would be silly. If won, games would provide points for the respective team. According to the original Uh Oh! sketch on It's Alive!, Blue went first, then Green and Red.

Uh Oh! was sponsored by Post Honeycomb for later episodes in the first season. As mentioned, Fruit Gushers became the official sponsor of Uh Oh! for its remaining two seasons.

== Characters and hosts ==
- Wink Yahoo (Scott Yaphe) was the show's main, wacky, zany, and extremely enthusiastic host. Wink wore his hair in a large pompadour and wore flamboyant sequined suits. Wink would sometimes taunt team members and showed no compassion when a team would lose all their points. Wink would always get overly excited when the spinner landed on the Uh Oh! space and would always feign regret if the player got the Uh Oh! question wrong or be disappointed if the player got the question right. Yaphe was one of the cast members from It's Alive! that moved over to Uh Oh!; the others being Patricia Ribeiro and Mike Beaver.
- Slashin' Sam and Tearin' Aaron (Samantha Cook and Aaron Alexander) refereed the spinner's partner at the Mayhem games. Jumpin' Joe (Joseph Pierre) also refereed the games on the show's first 13 episodes before Aaron replaced him.
- Quizmaster Patricia (Patricia Ribeiro) asked the spinner up to 10 questions at Speed Round. Patricia also watched the spinners' participant at The Dump.
- The Slime Master (Shaun Majumder/Ryan Belleville) hosted the Slime Tour and narrated the players' action. Majumder hosted the games up until the end of season 4 before Belleville replaced him.
- Christian Hagen, Erin Strimaitis, Akua Otupiri, and Dawn Cox assisted the Slime Master in introducing and refereeing the players at various Slime Tour stations. Cox replaced Otupiri for the show's sixth and final season.
- The Punisher (Mike Beaver/Sean "Bubba" Loucks) was a masked character dating back to the It's Alive! segment. However, the Punisher appeared in a somewhat reduced role on Uh Oh!. At the beginning of the show, the Punisher was released from a cage by either Sam or Aaron while being booed by the audience and went on a rampage and would sometimes attack audience members with goo (he even attacked Wink on at least three occasions). Wink would eventually say: "Punisher... control!". The Punisher would then retreat to the slime booth. During the commercial breaks, the Punisher would also mess with the audience. He would also often have a couple of water guns with which to torment them, and gooey pies was one of his favorites during seasons 5 and 6 (where "Bubba" replaces Beaver as the Punisher). His duties during the game were limited by dragging the spinner's partner to the Uh Oh! booth and pouring goo on them if the spinner's answer to an Uh Oh! question (see below) was wrong. He would act disappointed if the spinner answered correctly. In season 1, the Punisher would turn the cranks in certain Mayhem games. There were several occasions where either Uh Oh! wasn't landed on at all, or a question in the Uh Oh! category wasn't answered wrong.
- Mr. Voiceman (Dwayne Hill/Mike 'Nug' Nahrgang) is the show's announcer. Like Yaphe, Ribeiro, and Beaver, Hill was also part of the It's Alive! cast, as an audience warm-up.

== Gameplay ==
=== Opening ===
The game begins when Mr. Voiceman asks the audience a question: "What do you say when ... (insert type of usual but funny predicament: For example, "When you press the eject button on a toilet seat?")?", and the audience would respond the title show. Mr. Voiceman would introduce the show's main host, Wink Yahoo with a statement themed to his opening question: "The only (Canadian/North American) TV personality who... " with a response of cheering from the audience. Wink would respond in kind to Mr. Voiceman and introduce the other hosts within the studio. Wink would ask Mr. Voiceman to introduce the color teams and its two players, who were thereupon introduced followed by the introduction of the Punisher. Afterwards, Mr. Voiceman's duties were minor throughout the game: to announce the prizes won by the studio teams, Slime Tour players, and lucky audience members.

=== Round 1 ===
During Round 1, one player from each team are designated to spin a 12-space segmented wheel which featured a variety of possible activities or results that could occur. Their partner, who was located at the other end of the studio with the Punisher and equipped with goggles, was designated to perform the activity that the wheel landed on. Each team take turns spinning the wheel, with two cycles through the three teams. On many episodes, Wink would explain the rules like this:

Each spin of the wheel could alter your points, force you into messy activities, pose you some quick quizzes, or result in all sorts of unpleasant surprises, Mayhem, Uh Oh!, Speed Round, or The Dump.

In the first round, the wheel itself spun, and had pegs around the circumference. The chosen spot was denoted by a spring-loaded pointer that "clicked" past the pegs. Distribution of the spaces on the wheel changed throughout the show, but the first round spaces remained constant. In Season 1, spaces on the Round 1 wheel included 2 "Uh Oh!" spaces, 3 "Mayhem" spaces, 2 "Speed Round" spaces, 2 "The Dump" spaces, 2 "Win and Spin" spaces, and 1 "Trade and Spin" space. In Season 2, the Round 1 wheel was changed slightly with spaces including 3 "Uh Oh!" spaces, 3 "Mayhem" spaces, 2 "Speed Round" spaces, 1 "The Dump" space, 2 "Win and Spin" spaces, and 1 "Trade and Spin" space, and remained that way for the rest of the series. At the end of the round, Mr. Voiceman would announce the grand prize on the show's future episodes.

=== The Slime Tour (Round 2) ===
The second round features the Slime Tour, which features some footage shot at another location elsewhere across Canada. In its first season, the Slime Tour was played mainly in Yukon. Three contestants, dressed in Yellow, Orange, and Purple, competed in a themed obstacle course race. As mentioned, the Slime Tour was otherwise played the same way as the obstacle course segment on It's Alive!. After the contestants were introduced, the three teams within the studio had to select which colour contestant they thought would win the race. If they were right, they earned 35 points; otherwise, no points were awarded if they pick the runners up.

The obstacle course was generally made up of three different activities separated by a distance that would have to be run. Some of the activities required a physical skill; others simply required speed at completing a task. There was usually at least one task in each course that would get the contestant messy, and usually a task that required carrying something or wearing something throughout the rest of the race. The winner of the race won a prize for himself/herself with a different prize going to the runners up. During Season 4, the Slime Tour was sponsored by Sunny Delight with the sponsor located on the back of each of the contestants' shirts. During the show's run, the Slime Tour visited the following cities across Canada:

| Season 2 | Season 3 | Season 4 | Season 5 |
|---|---|---|---|
| Banff, Alberta; Charlottetown, Prince Edward Island; Drumheller, Alberta; Fredericton, New Brunswick; Halifax, Nova Scotia; Saskatoon, Saskatchewan; St. Denis, Saskatchewan; Victoria, British Columbia | Brandon, Manitoba; Corner Brook, Newfoundland; Louisbourg, Nova Scotia; St. John's, Newfoundland; Sudbury, Ontario; Thunder Bay, Ontario; Winnipeg, Manitoba | Edmonton, Alberta; Kamloops, British Columbia; Medicine Hat, Alberta; Montreal, Quebec; Moose Jaw, Saskatchewan; Quebec City, Quebec | Barrie, Ontario; Kamloops, British Columbia; Kelowna, British Columbia; Lunenburg, Nova Scotia; Moncton, New Brunswick; Penticton, British Columbia; Saint John, New Brunswick; Yarmouth, Nova Scotia |

When the Slime Tour later changed its name to Field Games during the show's sixth and final season, all of them were played in Toronto instead.

=== Round 3 ===
The third and final round was played essentially the same as the first round, with the players switching roles with their partners between the wheel and the Punisher. The wheel itself was replaced with an entirely different design. The wheel in the third round was stationary, and the indicator spun. The indicator was designed like a three-blade propeller; each blade was the colour of one of the teams, and framed the space on the wheel it landed at. A team landed on the space marked by the indicator of their colour. Spaces on the wheel were occasionally changed between seasons. Fixed spaces in Season 1 included 3 "Uh Oh!" spaces, 3 "Mayhem" spaces, 2 "Speed Round" spaces, 1 "The Dump" space, 1 "Win and Spin" space, 1 "Lose and Spin" space, and 1 "Trade and Spin" space. In Season 2, one of the Uh Oh! spaces was replaced with an "Uh Oh! Deluxe" space. In Season 5, the Uh Oh! Deluxe space was replaced with a "Pick It!" space, while in Season 6, it was replaced with a "Fruit Gushers" space.

During season 1, Wink interviewed both partners before starting the game action. It would often involve the previous round's action, and opinions for revenge on partners. The game ends when the team with the most points takes home the grand prize. If the game ended in a tie, a jump-in question was read. Whoever buzzed-in first with the correct answer won. Otherwise, their opponent would automatically win the grand prize. In a three-way tie, the two remaining teams would have a shot at the question. During early Season 6, an alternate tiebreaker was used in which the partners of the spinners involved in the tie bobbed for one Fruit Gusher each simultaneously at the Fruit Gushers station, this time with no time limit, and the one who gets the higher point value (colours don't count here) wins the points and the game. Towards the end of the season, the original tiebreaker was reinstated.

=== Credits ===
During the credits, the voiceover would always read a silly statement in lieu of statements such as "Due to technical difficulties..." or "This program was edited for broadcast."

== Games ==
- Uh Oh!: This eponymous spot requires Wink to ask the spinner a multiple-choice question, while the Punisher puts their partner in a glass booth. If the spinner answered correctly, the team earned 50 points and the spinner's partner left the booth untouched; otherwise, no points were awarded and the spinner's partner would have "goo" poured on him or her. In the latter case, Wink would give a main fact why the spinner answered incorrectly and the Punisher would utter a punchline, often related to the question, as he poured the slime on his victim.
  - An episode in 2000 featured six consecutive Uh Oh!s spun, all in the first round.
    - Uh Oh! Deluxe: Introduced in the show's second season, the deluxe version of Uh Oh! was worth 75 points, and generally contained a more difficult question. The penalty was also doubled to two buckets of slime. In seasons 2–3, the second bucket of goo, which was often made of metal, usually contained a more oily (shiny) type goo and often had sparkles mixed in it. The spot was changed slightly in the show's fourth season, in which Wink would make the spinner taste or sniff something, usually blindfolded in the second half of the season, and make them guess what ingredients it contains. This was based on a sketch that was used on It's Alive! called Non-Sense! The spinner would still be given multiple choice answers, which were only shown to the home audience. The second bucket mixture in the fourth season was also changed, to become a more thick mixture inside a bucket. Uh Oh! Deluxe revised its original question format in the show's fifth season and the second bucket of goo was mostly the same type as the first. Unchanged was the Punisher's habit of throwing in punchlines befitting the question.
- Mayhem: This spot requires Sam or Aaron to instruct the spinner's partner to complete a physical, often messy, activity within a 20-second time limit. Activities included searching for items in pools of goo, using various methods to target shoot with various types of projectiles, and grabbing items while using their mouth. Mayhem games are worth up to 50 points for the team. However, these are sometimes awarded incrementally, such as 10 points for each item found; but most of the games awarded all or nothing. There was one Mayhem game that appeared on every episode, but was not always played What's That?!, which offered 10 points for each of the correct five items that fit in a certain category.
- Speed Round: This spot is a lightning round and requires Patricia to ask the spinner up to 10 questions within a 20-second time limit. Each correct answer was worth five points for a potential of 50 points. Some questions had no wrong answer such as "Do you like [something]" and consecutive questions usually continued on a theme from the previous one. At the end, Wink would explain the outcome provided by the off-screen judges.
  - On one episode of the second season, contestant Christian of the red team answered "I Don't Know" to every question given to him in the Speed Round, resulting him in getting no questions rights and scoring 0 points.
- The Dump: This spot requires the spinner to drop his or her ball through a pipe into a gameboard which had Plinko-style pegs, manually operated flippers, other obstacles, and several receptacles for the ball to land in. The receptacles were marked with a game result including winning or losing certain numbers of points for his/her own team, winning (or in season 1, losing) points for other teams, or stealing points from other teams. The maximum winnings for the spot was worth 50 points.
- ... & Spin: Win & Spin earns 20 points of the team plus an additional spin. Lose & Spin loses 20 points for the team plus an additional spin to attempt to regain some points. Trade & Spin forces the team to trade scores with the spinner's choice of the other two teams, mostly if the spinner was not in the lead. Trade & Spin was very notorious because it could alter the outcome at any moment, especially when a team with a big lead was involved in a trade. If all teams have zero points no trade can be made. Each space resulted in a second spin for the team; landing on one of these spaces during a second spin would result in the scoring effect, but not a third spin.
- Pick It!: This spot replaced Uh Oh! Deluxe during the show's fifth season, and requires the spinner to decide whether to play Uh Oh!, Mayhem, Speed Round, The Dump, or Uh Oh! Deluxe. If the spinner fails to make a choice in 5 seconds, they miss their turn.
- Fruit Gushers: This spot replaced Pick It! during the show's sixth and final season, and requires the spinner's partner to bob for oversized Fruit Gushers floating within a giant Fruit Gusher within a 20-second time limit. Each Gusher had a team colour and point value on it; that team won the points that were indicated. Points are ranged between 5 and 75.

== Prizes ==
Prizes were awarded to the winning team at the end of each show and over the course of the series included Super Soakers, Mountain bikes, and stereos. Audience members would always receive Hubba Bubba bubble gum. Other prizes for the audience, amongst others, included Oreo cookies, the 1998 edition of the Canadian & World encyclopedia CD-ROM, Rock Candy, Planters Peanuts, Bop It (later, Bop It Extreme), various candies from Wonka, Voortman Cookies, New York Color, Juiced Up from Dare, Armstrong Cheese, Yoplait Tubes, Dippity Do Sport Gel, Fruit Gushers (the show's official sponsor in seasons 5 and 6).

On one of the earliest episodes in the first season, the first team to land on The Dump (indicated with a YTV basketball logo on the spaces) on the wheel would win 2 Rawlings NCAA basketballs, one for each team member, regardless of The Dump's outcome. On one episode, later that same season, Uh Oh! was not landed on at all during the show, leaving The Punisher depressed. Since the game ended a few minutes ahead of schedule, one lucky audience member would have a chance to win a Rawlings NCAA basketball by answering an Uh Oh! Style question asked by Sam. An incorrect answer resulted in The Punisher sliming that participant.

== Broadcast history ==
For the first 4 seasons of the series run, Uh Oh! aired every Friday at 6 PM following YTV's Flagship block The Zone. An encore episode would air on Saturday at 1 PM. Starting with season 4, encore episodes of the series aired on Sunday at 3 PM. For its final two seasons, Uh Oh! moved to airing on Saturday at 12:00 Noon with no encore presentations.
