= The Nut Job =

2014 film by Peter Lepeniotis

- Theatrical release poster
- Directed by: Peter Lepeniotis
- Screenplay by: Lorne Cameron; Peter Lepeniotis
- Story by: Daniel Woo; Peter Lepeniotis
- Based on: Surly Squirrel by Peter Lepeniotis
- Produced by: Woo-Kyung Jung; Graham Moloy
- Starring: Will Arnett; Brendan Fraser; Liam Neeson; Katherine Heigl; Stephen Lang; Jeff Dunham; Gabriel Iglesias; Sarah Gadon
- Edited by: Paul Hunter
- Music by: Paul Intson
- Production companies: RedRover; ToonBox Entertainment; Gulfstream Pictures
- Distributed by: Open Road Films (United States); Entertainment One (Canada); Sidus Pictures (South Korea); The Weinstein Company (international)
- Release dates: January 11, 2014 (Los Angeles); January 17, 2014 (United States and Canada); January 29, 2014 (South Korea)
- Running time: 86 minutes
- Countries: Canada; South Korea; United States
- Languages: English; Korean
- Budget: $30 million
- Box office: $122.5 million

The Nut Job is a 2014 animated comedy film directed by Peter Lepeniotis, who also wrote the film with Lorne Cameron. It stars the voices of Will Arnett, Brendan Fraser, Liam Neeson, Katherine Heigl, Stephen Lang, Jeff Dunham, Gabriel Iglesias and Sarah Gadon. The film is loosely based on Lepeniotis' 2005 short animated film Surly Squirrel.

Produced by Gulfstream Pictures, Redrover International and ToonBox Entertainment, it was released in the United States on January 17, 2014, by Open Road Films. The film received generally negative reviews from critics, but grossed $122.5 million worldwide. A sequel, The Nut Job 2: Nutty by Nature, was released on August 11, 2017.

== Plot ==
In October 1959, in the fictional town of Oakton City, a squirrel named Surly and his rat partner Buddy reside in Liberty Park where their thieving reputation has made them outcasts from a group of urban animals led by Raccoon and his assistant Cardinal, who are currently running low on food for the upcoming winter. To solve the situation, two squirrels, Andie and Grayson, are assigned to scavenge from a nut cart ran by two men named Lucky and Fingers, who are casing a bank. Andie and Grayson run into Surly and Buddy, who are also trying to rob the cart but their scuffle inadvertently ends with the cart's propane tank exploding in the park and destroying the food supply, resulting in Surly's banishment from the park, much to his dismay.

In the city however, Surly and Buddy find Maury's Nut Shop which is just adjacent to the bank, it is a criminal hideout used by Lucky, Fingers, their boss, Percy "King" Dimpleweed, who was recently released from jail and his assistant Knuckles. They plan to break through the wall and replace the bank's cash with nuts, though King's girlfriend Lana believes that King has gone straight after his release from prison and the nut store is legitimate. Meanwhile, Surly and Buddy plan to rob the place.

At the park, Andie and Grayson head into the city to find more food but they get separated when a street rat approaches and attacks them and Andie is left alone. The next day, Andie comes across the nut shop and confronts Surly, forcing him to share the nuts he plans to take. Surly accepts and unwittingly befriends Fingers' pet pug Precious after threatening her with a dog whistle. Andie returns to the park and informs the community of the plan, to which Raccoon accepts, though planning to deny Surly his share, and assigns Mole and the Bruisers to go with Andie. Grayson returns to the group, having become paranoid after his encounter with the rat, and Surly catches Mole sabotaging the heist, promptly interrogating and learning from Mole of Raccoon's plan to control the food supply in order to remain as the park community's leader. Surly attempts to tell the others but when they don't believe him, he angrily storms off and Buddy stays behind. While collecting the nuts on his own, Surly is captured by King but is freed by Lana, who has found out about his plan to rob the bank.

After fending off the street rats who actually work for Raccoon, Surly and Grayson team up and chase the criminal gang's getaway truck, which carries Raccoon and the others. Surly fights off Raccoon's Cardinal, and Mole defects from Raccoon and reveals the truth to the animals, resulting in Raccoon being voted out of the park community. King and Knuckles use the dynamite inside the empty truck to blow up a police barricade at a dam, but the police shoot a tire on the truck that causes it to fall from the dam. It explodes after Surly gets himself and Andie off it, causing the dam to collapse, a flash flood to happen, and everyone falling into the river below. Surly makes it onto a log, but finds out that Raccoon, King, and Knuckles survived the explosion. Raccoon tries to kill Surly but the weight of nuts and water break the log, sending both of them over a waterfall. The animals arrive to rescue them, but Surly, in a moment of selflessness, lets himself fall into the waterfall with Raccoon. Now seeing the good side of Surly, the group mourns him as they float home in the river.

The nuts flood their way into Liberty Park, where King and his associates are arrested, and Lana breaks up with King, while simultaneously taking ownership of his nut shop. Precious discovers Surly's unconscious body and alerts Buddy, who lays beside him in grief, and speaks for the first time. Surly eventually wakes up and hugs Buddy, with Andie finding him moments later, embracing him and suggesting to tell the other animals of his heroism. However, Surly declines, allowing Grayson and the team to take credit for saving the park, while also agreeing to work with them from now on, and he and Buddy give Andie one last goodbye before going back into the city.

In a mid-credits scene, Raccoon and Cardinal are revealed to still be alive and are plotting revenge, while stuck on a buoy in the ocean, surrounded by hungry sharks circling them to still.

== Voice cast ==
- Will Arnett as Surly, an intelligent, charismatic and manipulative purple squirrel who is the main protagonist.
- Brendan Fraser as Grayson, a glory-hogging Eastern gray squirrel who has a false reputation for being the "park hero".
- Liam Neeson as Norvirus Raccoon, a self-proclaimed raccoon that leads the park and banishes Surly from the same park. Raccoon's also known for his thirst for Surly's blood which later in the film terrorizes Andie due to her affections for Surly.
- Katherine Heigl as Andie, a compassionate red squirrel who eventually becomes Surly's love interest.
- Stephen Lang as Percy "King" Dimpleweed, a mob boss with a fear of vermin.
- Jeff Dunham as Mole, a clumsy blue mole who works for Raccoon and has eyes that are sensitive to light.
- Gabriel Iglesias as Jimmy, a groundhog and the leader of the Bruisers.
- Sarah Gadon as Lana, King's girlfriend, later ex-girlfriend.
- Maya Rudolph as Precious, a pug that is owned by Fingers and later Lana.
- James Rankin as Fingers, King's fellow criminal who runs the "Maury's Nut Shop" with Fingers.
- Scott Yaphe as Lucky, the owner of the peanut cart, who is Precious' owner and King's associate.
- Joe Pingue as Johnny, a groundhog and a member of the Bruisers.
- Annick Obonsawin as Jamie, a small female groundhog and a member of the Bruisers.
- Julie Lemieux as a girl scout that tries to buy nuts from Fingers and Lucky's nut cart.
- Robert Tinkler as Buddy, a mute blue rat who is Surly's incompetent partner-in-crime
  - Tinkler also voices Redline, a mouse who idolizes Grayson and whose catchphrase is "We're all gonna die!"
- James Kee voices an armored truck guard
  - Kee also voices a street rat.
- Scott McCord as a police officer who tries to get Fingers and Lucky to show him a permit for their nut vending.
  - McCord also provides the voices of miscellaneous animals.
- Katie Griffin as a park pigeon

== Production ==
The film's concept originated as a 2005 short film titled Surly Squirrel. A second short film, Nuts & Robbers, was released as a teaser for The Nut Job.

On January 17, 2011, it was announced that Lorne Cameron would write the screenplay for the film, along with Peter Lepeniotis. On November 15, 2012, it was announced that Katherine Heigl, Will Arnett and Brendan Fraser had joined the cast of the film, and on March 1, 2013, it was announced that Liam Neeson had also joined. On December 19, 2013, it was announced that South Korean entertainer PSY makes a cameo appearance as himself during the film's ending credits, which also features his hit song "Gangnam Style".

The film's production art was featured in a Brampton, Ontario exhibit.

== Release ==
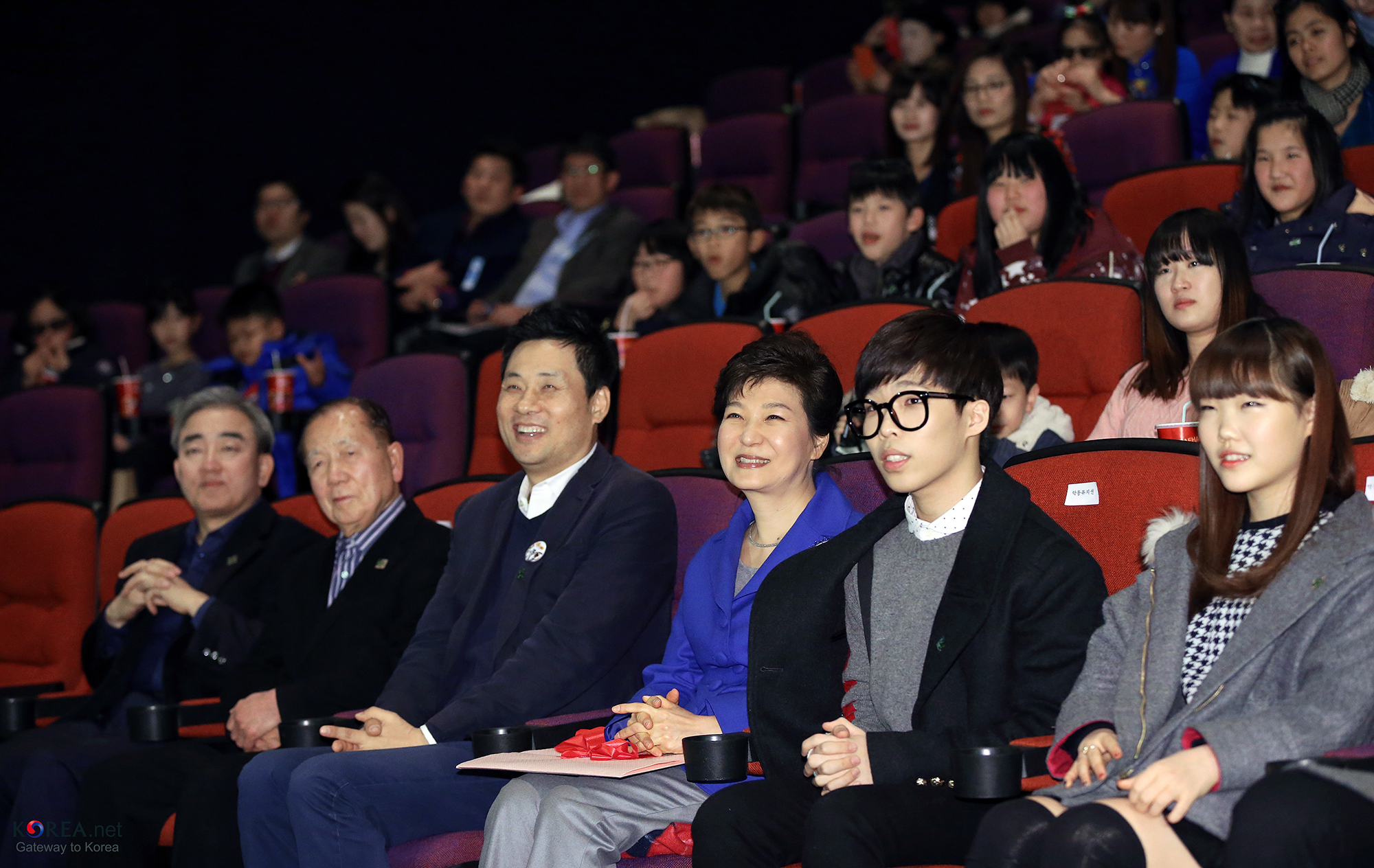
Ha Hoe-jin, CEO of Red Rover (middle left), and Park Geun-hye, the then president of South Korea (middle right), at the South Korean premiere of the film.

The film was released in the United States on January 17, 2014, and distributed by Open Road Films. International distribution was handled by The Weinstein Company. The first teaser trailer for the film was released on September 27, 2013. The film had its premiere at a Regal Cinemas theater in Los Angeles on January 11, 2014.

=== Home media ===
The Nut Job was released on DVD, Blu-ray and Blu-ray 3D on April 15, 2014, by Universal Pictures Home Entertainment.

== Reception ==
=== Critical response ===
On review aggregator Rotten Tomatoes, the film has an approval rating of 13%, based on 98 reviews, and an average score of 4/10. The site's critical consensus reads, "Hampered by an unlikable central character and source material stretched too thin to cover its brief running time, The Nut Job will provoke an allergic reaction in all but the least demanding moviegoers." On Metacritic, which calculates a normalized rating from reviews, the film has an average weighted score of 37 out of 100, based on 28 critics, indicating "generally unfavorable reviews". Audiences polled by CinemaScore gave the film a "B" grade, on an A+ to F scale.

Peter Debruge of Variety wrote, "The Nut Job comes up short compared with a film like Ratatouille, which, despite its less-than-adorable rodents, won audiences over through appealing voicework and writing." Alonso Duralde of The Wrap wrote, "The Nut Job is merely shrill and frantic, chock-full of uninspired characters and tedious wackiness." Michael Rechtshaffen of The Hollywood Reporter wrote, "A whimsical period setting helps this 3D animated caper escape some overly familiar trappings." Bill Goodykoontz of The Arizona Republic wrote, "Arnett is a great comedic actor, an acidic wit. But here his Surly is just a selfish jerk. If there weren't some redemption involved, this wouldn't be a by-the-numbers animated feature. But it is, and there is, and it is wholly predictable." Linda Barnard of the Toronto Star gave the film two out of four stars, saying, "If The Nut Job fails to connect through its characters it deserves praise for being a visually inspired effort, with clear homage paid to 1950s animation styles, especially Warner Bros. classics." Chris Cabin of Slant Magazine gave the film one out of four stars, saying, "There's no personality in the design or the script, which only renders the cynical aftertaste of this convoluted one-squirrel-against the-world story all the more potent." Jordan Hoffman of the New York Daily News gave the film two out of five stars, saying, "The cartoon is stuffed with exhausting visual mayhem. Some jokes land, but most kids over 10 will roll their eyes."

Joe Williams of the St. Louis Post-Dispatch gave the film one and a half stars out of four, saying, "The burnished backgrounds are pleasant to look at, but finding something to savor in the story is a tough nut to crack." Michael Phillips of the Chicago Tribune gave the film one out of four stars, saying, "The Nut Job fights its protagonist's own charmlessness from the first scene. Turning a dislikable leading character a little less dislikable by the end credits sets an awfully low bar for this sort of thing." Rafer Guzman of Newsday gave the film one and a half stars out of four, saying, "The overall mood resembles a furry, nut-based version of Stanley Kubrick's The Killing." Peter Hartlaub of the San Francisco Chronicle gave the film two out of four stars, saying, "Someone spent a lot of time making the architecture and production design match the era. Grandparents getting dragged to The Nut Job will be appreciative." Annlee Ellingson of the Los Angeles Times wrote, "The Nut Job features decent CG animation, especially of animals, but the writing isn't particularly clever, relying on obvious puns and slapstick humor." Stephanie Merry of The Washington Post gave the film two out of five stars, saying, "That feeling of been-there-done-that is pervasive, with many of the jokes sounding like they were ripped off from other movies." Kevin McFarland of The A.V. Club gave the film an F, saying, "The most egregious problem with The Nut Job is how shamelessly it fills in the gaps left by expanding Lepeniotis' short with generic and tedious rogue-to-hero cliché."

Scott Bowles of USA Today gave the film one and a half stars out of four, saying, "When the story gets stale, the movie inserts a 'nuts' pun or, worse, resorts to a gas or burp joke. It doesn't work the first time, nor the fifth." Miriam Bale of The New York Times wrote, "The Nut Job features muddy-colored and often ugly animation, a plot that feels too stretched out and loaded with details to hold the attention of most children, and more flatulence jokes than anyone deserves." Adam Nayman of The Globe and Mail gave the film two out of four stars, saying, "Only a multilevel chase sequence involving Surly and some glowing-eyed street rats has any real kinetic excitement, and the supporting characters lack visual distinction." Bill Zwecker of the Chicago Sun-Times gave the film two and a half stars out of four, saying, "The bottom line: Kids may be mildly amused by The Nut Job, but adults accompanying them won't find much to capture their interest." Kimberley Jones of The Austin Chronicle gave the film two out of five stars, saying, "The richly hued CG animation is quite nice – a mix of hyperdetailed character work and painterly cityscapes and pastorals – and the script putters along with small but regular amusements." Tom Russo of The Boston Globe gave the film one and a half stars out of four, saying, "The plot doesn't take clever turns, the visual thrills aren't all that thrilling, and you're ultimately left to get your heist-movie kicks elsewhere." Joel Arnold of NPR wrote, "Once Surly and Buddy case the joint, develop a plan, and deal with the inevitable surprises, The Nut Job could be any classic caper flick."

=== Box office ===
The Nut Job grossed $64 million in North America, and over $58. million in other countries, for a worldwide total of over $122 million. In North America, the film opened at number three in its first weekend, with $19,423,000, behind Ride Along and Lone Survivor. It had the biggest opening weekend ever for an independent animated feature film. In its second weekend, the film stayed at number three, grossing an additional $12 million. In its third weekend, the film dropped to number four, grossing over $7 million, and in its fourth weekend, the film dropped to number eight, grossing over 3 million.

=== Awards ===
The film was nominated for Best Sound Editing – Feature Film at the 2014 Directors Guild of Canada Awards. Paul Hunter won for The Nut Job in the Best Editing in Animation category at the Canadian Cinema Editors Awards.

The French ATAA awarded the film Best Dubbing Adaptation for an Animated Film for 2015.

== Soundtrack ==
The film's score was composed by Paul Intson. The soundtrack was released on January 17, 2014.

== Other media ==
=== Sequel ===
On January 23, 2014, The Nut Job 2 was announced, with an initial release date of January 15, 2016. On April 11, 2016, the release date was pushed back to May 19, 2017. Will Arnett, Gabriel Iglesias, Jeff Dunham, Katherine Heigl and Maya Rudolph reprised their roles. The film details the park animals banding together to prevent a crooked mayor from bulldozing Liberty Park and replacing it with a dangerous amusement park. On May 25, 2016, Heitor Pereira was hired to score the film. On July 5, 2016, Jackie Chan joined the cast as territorial street mouse gang leader Mr. Feng.

=== Possible television series ===
In February 2019, it was announced that a television series based on the film titled Nut Jobs! was in the early stages of development.
