= Bolts & Blip =

Television series

- Genre: Comedy; Action/Adventure; Comic science fiction Robots
- Developed by: ToonBox Entertainment; Redrover Co., Ltd.
- Written by: Eric Trueheart; Chad Hicks; Terry McGurrin; Mark Ackland
- Directed by: Peter Lepeniotis; Mark Ackland; Riccardo Durante; Tim Deacon
- Starring: Matt Murray; Terry McGurrin; Melissa Altro; Glenn Coulson
- Countries of origin: Canada; South Korea
- Original language: English
- No. of episodes: 26

Production
- Executive producers: Hong Kim; Daniel Woo
- Producers: Thom Chapman; Drehyun Ryu
- Production companies: ToonBox Entertainment; Redrover Co., Ltd.

Original release
- Network: Teletoon; The CW (Vortexx)
- Release: June 28, 2010 – December 25, 2011

Bolts & Blip is an animated television series that aired on Teletoon from 2010 to 2011. The show has also aired on 3net at 10:30 am on Sundays, and The CW's Saturday morning block, Vortexx, from July 13, 2013 at 8:30 a.m.

== Plot ==
The series is a comic action adventure set on the Moon in 2080. It follows two central city misfits, Bolts and Blip, who accidentally find themselves as members of the Lunar League's last placed team the Thunderbolts. With the help of their rag-tag band of teammates, the two friends discover what they are made of in this intergalactic sports circuit.

== Characters ==
=== Main cast ===
- Blip (voiced by Matt Murray) - One of the two main titular protagonists. Blip is a bumbling Civi-Bot who attempts to keep within societal norms, but is not very successful. He is best friend and roommate to the wacky Bolts, and often must drag his impulsive friend out of trouble. He is the more mature, level-headed of the duo. He along with Bolts were accidentally drafted into the Lunar League's bottom team, The Thunderbolts. He has a huge crush on Saedee, who spends most of the series ignoring his displays of affection, while occasionally letting slip possible mutual feelings, before revealing in the season finale she too loves Blip. Late in the series he is revealed to be Dr. Tommy's Secret Bot, and has latent powers, which he calls his "Super Mode"; in this state he is taller, stronger, faster, and can fly. He has a pet mouse like robot named Squeaker, who prior to undergoing training was very violent and attacked everyone, But nowadays he only attacks Bolts.
- Bolts/Blood's Bot/Darth Boltor (voiced by Terry McGurrin) - The other titular protagonist. Bolts is immature, impulsive and has a talent for getting himself into trouble; including one time where he put himself under huge debt to a Robot Mafia Leader Vinnie Two-Chimes, after losing a bet in a (fixed) sock fight match. But he does occasionally show he has some common sense as seen in Little Squeaker when he thinks it's a bad idea to show Squeaker around to the Thunderbolts after Squeaker viciously attacked both him and Saedee's housewarming present. He also shows some signs of intelligence and ingenuity as also seen in little Squeaker when he modified an illegal weapon to bring up to legal standards only to have his talented creation shot down by Gridiron telling the sport was a croquet sport match and not a battle. He's the team's jokester and often drives Coach Gridiron insane. He once entered a secret (and illegal) wrestling tournament under the name Bolto de Fuego (a play on Bola de Fuego), and has continued using the name Boltor as his screen name. Like Blip he has latent powers, where his eyes will turn red and he gains monstrous strength. He is eventually revealed to be "Blood's Bot", the ultimate creation of Dr. Blood.
- Saedee (voiced by Melissa Altro) - The gorgeous heroine Saedee, who is Captain of the Thunderbolts. She is a prototype model from her production line, and as a result has a habit of malfunctioning, usually in the form of her legs involuntarily kicking or falling off. Blip has a huge crush on her, and while her feelings are mutual she tries very hard to hide this, instead lusting over Tigrr Jaxxon.
- Coach Gridiron (voiced by Patrick Garrow) - Short-tempered and combustible, Coach Gridiron employs harsh training routines in an attempt to bolster their bottom placed ranking, however deep down, behind all the raging steam he can be compassionate and understanding. His head has a habit of steaming and blowing off.
- Tigrr Jaxxon (voiced by Glenn Coulson) - The star player of the Lunar League. He is on the All Stars team, which (unsurprisingly) are the top of the Lunar League. He is very arrogant and prideful, but (as many find out over the course of the series) he isn't very bright. In the episode, "Tigrr By The Tail", it also revealed he is secretly a coward. He was initially implied to be Blood's Bot, but the team investigate and discover otherwise. His name is a reference to Tiger Jackson.
- Dr. Arthur Blood (voiced by Colin Fox) - The main antagonist of the series, he is an evil human scientist who was formally colleague to Dr. Tommy. He is usually seen in a hover-chair with his back facing the camera. He created the Bloodbots, who all look the same, and are devoid of emotion, designed only for violence. He reorganized into the first Galactic Shadow Empire
- D-Gor - Dr. Arthur Blood's unfortunate servant, who is a parody of Igor. Like Igor he is deformed, and hunched. Dr. Blood likes to use him as a means of venting his anger, by yelling at him or smashing his fist on top of his head (shown in the Opening Sequence).

=== Minor and recurring characters ===
- Steve (voiced by Jonathan Wilson) – The diminutive, long-suffering assistant to Coach Gridiron. Steve is constantly overlooked and scorned by his peers, due to his diminutive size and incompetence. Steve is very short, speaks with an English accent, and has a single wheel in place of legs. When he isn't slaving for the team's every whim, he secretly plots elevating his own status, wanting Coach Gridiron's job. He has a particularly hostile relationship with Bolts, and they have physical confrontations on several occasions, especially during the time when he and Bolts both entered in the wrestling tournament (under the guise the Silver Steve), with him and Bolts being the main attractions.
- Welder (voiced by Martin Julien) – A gentle giant, who longs for days when he was younger and shinier.
- Ratch-8 (voiced by Paul Wensley) – A teammate on the Thunderbolts. His name is a pun on the word "ratchet".
- The Reformatter – A fearsome monstrous machine who captures robots and remakes them into electronic appliances. He is feared by all robots in the Lunar League. Blip once says: "No one has ever gone inside and come out looking the same."
- Dr. Tommy (voiced by Dwayne Hill) - He is the genius doctor who created every Robot living on the Moon, with the exception of the Blood-bots and Blood's Bot (a robot created by Dr. Blood as his secret weapon). He also created the Dr. Tommy's bot (revealed to be Blip) and the mysterious Black Box, which has many untold powers. He and Dr. Blood were formerly colleagues, but upon discovering Blood's evil plans of world domination, turned on him. He appears mostly in flashbacks throughout the series, and finally appears in person in the Season Finale, where his face is finally revealed.
- The Blood Bots - Dr. Blood's army of robots. They all look exactly the same; red (with Dr. Blood's patterns), rounded, a single glowing slit for eyes, speaking in robotic monotone voices, mounted cannons instead of left hands, and they hover above the ground (lacking feet). They seem to be devoid of emotion, other than that of unquestioningly obeying Dr. Blood's every command. It is explained by Dr. Tommy this is because unlike his robots, the Blood-bots have no hearts. This also gives rise to them being very socially inept. They are despised by every team in the Lunar League.
- Klank Lockton and Lock Clankton (both voiced by Dwayne Hill) - The two robot announcers for the Lunar League. Clank Lockton is obnoxious and overbearing, always hogging the screen and putting down his fellow announcer Lock Clankton. Lock virtually never gets the chance to talk or announce anything, as any of his attempts always result in Clank pushing him aside. His voice is heard in episodes 4, 24, and especially 26, when he announces the final showdown between the robots and Dr. Blood.
- Vinnie Two-Chimes – The fearsome robot mob-boss, who is in fact a tiny, primitively designed, box-shaped robot on two wheels. He completely lacks human features (no head, arms, legs), only possessing two blinking lights and communicates via beeps. He is however in charge of two towering robot henchman who do his dirty work. He has scammed Bolts on numerous occasions, and for a large portion of the series Bolts has been in debt to him. A running gag is Bolts' endless, vain attempts to acquire money to pay off his never-ending debt.
- Motbot – A shady bot who has a habit of hiding in trash cans, he is Blip's link to his secret origins, and acts as his mentor, guiding him to his destiny as Dr. Tommy's Secret Bot.
- The Schleprechauns – Robot Leprechauns who scavenge for scrap metal to turn into Goldium, a highly prized element able to enhance any electronic device's functions and capabilities.
- Helsing-V – A vampire hunter, and a parody of Van Helsing. He appears when Dr. Blood unleashes a Robot-Vampire Virus that infects the whole Thunderbolts team, and teams up with Blip to fight the Robot-Vampires and find a cure. He also made an appearance in the series finale. He has a habit of throwing smoke bombs and disappearing in mysterious puffs of smoke.
- Supreme Ambassador Garry – The man in control of Earth Command, he does what he likes from getting Gridiron re-programmed to helping organise the goings on in Lunar City. A rather overbearing and demeaning person, he'll often disregard his responsibilities in favour of a good game of golf.

== Episodes ==
No.	Title	Directed by	Written by	Canadian airdate	U.S. airdate
1	"Moon Units"	Peter Lepenniotis, Mark Ackland & Riccardo Durante	Eric Trueheart	June 28, 2010	July 13, 2013
Bolts and Blip are average Civi-bots working for the Thunderbolts, as well as best friends. While on the job, Blip accidentally drafts him and Bolts into the Lunar League games as Battle Bots.
2	"Move It or Lose It"	Riccardo Durante & Mark Ackland	Eric Trueheart	June 29, 2010	July 20, 2013
Bolts and Blip gain popularity due to a signature move, which quickly makes them unpopular with the rest of the ThunderBolts, especially Welder.
3	"Little Squeaker"	Riccardo Durante & Mark Ackland	Chad Hicks	June 30, 2010	July 27, 2013
Bolts and Blip find an unknown robot in their new quarters. It appears to be a virtual pet mouse dubbed by Blip as 'Squeaker', but its unusual model makes the team suspicious. Is Squeaker, vicious to everyone but Blip, really a V-pet? Or is he something more sinister...?
4	"Cyrano de Bolts"	Riccardo Durante & Mark Ackland	Terry McGurrin	July 1, 2010	August 3, 2013
Bolts coaches Blip on how he can win Saedee's affections and ask her out on a date. Taking his advice, Blip tries to make Saedee jealous by dating a gigantic girl robot named Olga, the captain of The Iron Maidens. The Thunderbolts and Iron Maidens do battle to solve all of their dating problems.
5	"A Kinder, Gentler Gridiron"	Peter Lepeniotis	Eric Trueheart	July 2, 2010	August 10, 2013
Coach Gridiron is re-programmed to help him find his gentler side. With the somewhat over the top success, the others start to see the positives in being re-programmed too. Saedee re-programs to be feminine to attract Tigrr Jaxxson, Blip re-programs to be a macho man, and Welder re-programs to be more youthful. But when their new personalities start getting them into trouble, Bolts and Steve reluctantly join forces to get their friends back to normal.
6	"The Quest of the Goblin Crown, Part III"	Peter Lepiniotis	Chad Hicks	July 5, 2010	August 17, 2013
Bolts and Ratch-8 download an illegal movie called "Quest for the Goblin Crown, Part III". But when Blip accidentally downloads the film into his head, he truly believes he is Angor the Brave, protagonist for the movie. In order to get the movie file out of his system, the Thunderbolts all must follow on his perilous journey. With Bolts as Filbix the wizard, Saedee as Melia the Elf and Tigrr Jaxxson as Princess Twinkleheart, hilarity ensues.
7	"The Curse of the Vampire Bot"	Peter Lepeniotis & Tim Deacon	Eric Trueheart	July 6, 2010	August 24, 2013
The evil Dr. Blood uses a bat-bot to infect Saedee with a virus that turns her into a vampire bot. He plans to use her to infect every player Lunar League in order to conquer the Moon, then the galaxy. When the whole team is turned into vampire bots (while wearing Steve's shorts on their heads), Blip joins forces with Helsing-V, a vampire bot hunter, to save them.
8	"The Magic of the Schleprechauns"	Peter Lepeniotis & Tim Deacon	Eric Trueheart	July 7, 2010	August 31, 2013
When the Thunderbolts end up with the worst jet planes ever for their upcoming match, Bolts suggests getting a pot of goldium from the legendary Schleprechauns to power their fighters. No one takes him seriously, but after making a deal with Saedee and Blip, the trio try to find them. By a miracle, they discover that the Schleprechans are real, and so is their pot of goldium. But there's a catch. To get the pot of goldium, they first have to find King Spinklewink's son, last heard of exploring the depths of the Reformatter. Can Bolts get him out? Or will he end up a toaster?
9	"Welded Away"	Peter Lepeniotis & Tim Deacon	Chad Hicks	July 8, 2010	September 7, 2013
It's Dr. Tommy Day, where all robots show appreciation for him in the form of a giant statue. When Bolts and Blip are tricked by Tigrr Jaxxson into defiling the statue, and Gridiron threatens to put the robots who did it in the Reformatter, they desperately try to come up with a way to fix it. Unfortunately, Welder finds out about this situation, but after Gridiron, Steve and the Reformatter turn up at the door for Welder, Bolts and Blip think that he has been reformatted. Sad because it's their fault, they try to rebuild him and help him remember who he is. But instead, they create a rabid franken-robot which begins to terrorize Lunar City. Meanwhile, Welder, revealed not to be reformatted, is ordered by Gridiron to go to the robot spa to receive a new upgrade, but is accompanied by the Reformatter, who ends up making his whole trip miserable.
10	"El Bolto Del Fuego"	Peter Lepeniotis & Tim Deacon	Eric Trueheart	July 9, 2010	September 14, 2013
Belittled and teased by the others, especially Steve, Bolts feels like "a scrawny bot the rest of the team puts up with". When a Civi-bot takes him to a fight and file sharing club, he falls in love with the sport, beating all his competitors. When he is pitched against Steve, and wins, it becomes an all out war between the two, both in and out of the ring. When Blip finds out after taking Saedee on a "practice date" to the fights, he intervenes, joining the fight. When Steve makes another nasty remark to Bolts, something inside him snaps, causing Bolts to unleash his darker side.
11	"Robots Don't Dream, Part 1"	Peter Lepeniotis & Tim Deacon	Mark Ackland	July 12, 2010	September 21, 2013
After getting knocked out by Tigrr Jaxxson during a match, Blip begins to have dreams/flashbacks of when he was being built. Nobody listens though, because after Bolts gets struck by lightning, he begins to sing prophecies, thinking Blip is just jealous. But as the dreams persist, Blip discovers even more about Dr. Blood and Dr. Tommy, including the day Dr. Blood turned evil. When the rest of the team get horrifyingly beaten due to them following Bolts' magical advice, Blip transforms into a powerful bot, protecting his friends and smashing the opposing team with his newfound powers.
12	"Robots Don't Dream, Part 2"	Peter Lepeniotis & Tim Deacon	Mark Ackland	July 13, 2010	September 28, 2013
When the Blood Bots re-purpose halfway through a game, Blip gets suspicious. When he meets Mot-Bot, a muddy but smart bot who knows all about the Dr. Blood/Dr. Tommy conspiracy, he finds out even more about himself. Blip is revealed to be Dr. Tommy's secret weapon bot, the only robot who can stop Dr. Blood's army and the dreaded "Blood's Bot", an egotistical and lightning prone robot. Meanwhile, Tigrr Jaxxson decides to retire from the league in favor of a "higher calling" from the lightning gods.
13	"Steve in Charge"	Peter Lepeniotis & Tim Deacon	Eric Trueheart	July 14, 2010	October 5, 2013
Steve is in charge of the Thunderbolts when Gridiron is sent to a coach's seminar. When the Loob-Cola company offers an enormous amount of money to publicize their product, all of the Thunderbolts except Blip are taken in. When the product advertising keeps making them lose matches, Blip takes it into his own hands to show everyone how to play for the love of the game instead of for the cash.
14	"A Blip in Time"	Peter Lepenniotis, Mark Ackland & Riccardo Durante	Eric Trueheart	July 15, 2010	October 12, 2013
It's All Robots Day, where all robots get a free day off work. Each robot day there is a beacon treasure hunt. But when Bolts and Blip are knocked out of the race by Tigrr Jaxxson, they find more than they bargained for...
15	"Trump Card"	Peter Lepenniotis, Mark Ackland & Riccardo Durante	Eric Trueheart	November 5, 2011	October 19, 2013
Blip wants to unlock his newfound "Super Mode", but he doesn't know how to activate it. After a series of hilarious misadventures at the hands of Bolts to get them working, Bolts falls in love with police work, but takes it over the edge. Blip tries to shake him out of it, but to no avail. But when Bolts picks a fight with a gang of thugs, things take a turn for the worse. Can Blip save his friend before his head is pulled off?
16	"The Black Box"	Peter Lepenniotis & Tim Deacon	Riccardo Durante	November 7, 2011	November 2, 2013
Everyone on the Thunderbolts falls under the spell of the Black Box, which is the mysterious hard drive that holds the schematics for all the robots in Lunar City. Meanwhile, Dr. Blood sends the Blood Bots to gain control of its enchanting powers.
17	"My Fair Dee Dee"	Peter Lepenniotis & Tim Deacon	Elizabeth Whitmere	November 9, 2011	November 9, 2013
Saedee's cousin, Dee Dee visits and decides to join the Thunderbolts team to get closer to Blip. Bolts helps to spark the romance and rivalry as the Thunderbolts do battle on the field with the Iron Maidens.
18	"Moon Invasion"	Peter Lepenniotis, Mark Ackland & Riccardo Durante	Eric Trueheart	November 11, 2011	November 16, 2013
The Thunderbolts are losing a match to the All Stars when a meteor is detected hurtling towards the Moon, causing the game to be canceled. During the evacuation, Ratch-8 is interviewed by the news, and his wild imaginings of an alien invasion stir up a public (and media) panic. The Thunderbolts are temporarily recruited by the military to fight the "alien menace".
19	"Evil Saedee"	Peter Lepenniotis & Tim Deacon	Adam Greydon Reid	November 18, 2011	January 18, 2014
A mysterious new prototype named Saedee-34 joins the Thunderbolts and quickly takes over Saedee's role as team captain. When the team becomes infatuated with the new girl robot, Saedee gets jealous and starts investigating where this robot came from.
20	"Tigrr by the Tail"	Peter Lepenniotis & Tim Deacon	Eric Trueheart	November 25, 2011	January 25, 2014
When Bolts and Blip suspect that Tigrr Jaxxson is the evil "Blood's Bot", they find a way to get close to him to investigate. After getting stuck in the tunnel system, Tigrr reveals his true identity when as he is stalked in the tunnels by a monster-bot from folklore, the "Boogey-Bot".
21	"We Are the Champions"	Peter Lepenniotis & Tim Deacon	Eric Trueheart	December 2, 2011	February 1, 2014
The Thunderbolts tie with the All-Stars for first place in the Lunar League. Meanwhile, Blip avoids being scanned by the Blood Bots as Dr. Blood plans to discover the hidden identity of Dr. Tommy's secret weapon bot. In the end, the Thunderbolts and the All-Stars tie for first place to defeat the Blood Bots, and Dr. Blood discovers the identity of his own secret weapon bot...
22	"Lord of the Box" (Battle of the Lunar League, Part 1)	Peter Lepenniotis & Tim Deacon	Eric Trueheart	December 9, 2011	February 8, 2014
Bolts asks Blip to use his "Super Mode" to protect him from Vinnie Two-Chimes, but their friendship is tested when Blip refuses to let Bolts use his powers. Blip is made protector of the Black Box by Mot-Bot the Schleprecauns, to keep it safe from Dr. Blood's clutches. Later, he and Bolts later have an argument how careless Bolts is, so he ends their friendship, seeing that he can't even be trusted by Blip, making him vulnerable to D-Gor and Dr. Blood!
23	"Fall Out" (Battle of the Lunar League, Part 2)	Peter Lepenniotis & Tim Deacon	Adam Greydon Reid	December 16, 2011	February 15, 2014
Blip misses his friend and can't quite get it together on the battlefield without Bolts. Bolts is brought to Dr. Blood's lair by D-Gor, where he learns his true identity and evil purpose as Dr. Blood's ultimate weapon.
24	"Blood Rising" (Battle of the Lunar League, Part 3)	Peter Lepenniotis & Tim Deacon	Thomas Hart	December 23, 2011	February 22, 2014
Now that Bolts has left the team, the Thunderbolts are losing their Lunar League games. Saedee goes missing, and is later revealed to be captured by Dr. Blood. The new "evil" Bolts takes the Black Box for Dr. Blood to begin the final phase of his plan, and tries to destroy Blip as he escapes to the Schleprecauns' lair for reinforcements.
25	"Pandemonium" (Battle of the Lunar League, Part 4)	Peter Lepenniotis & Tim Deacon	Eric Trueheart	December 25, 2011	March 1, 2014
Bolts uses Dr. Blood's ultimate weapon, the Mega-Blood, to attack Lunar City. Blip, Mot-Bot, Helsing-V, and the Schleprecauns rescue Saedee from Dr. Blood's lair and begin the final showdown to save everyone from Dr. Blood... and his ex-best friend.
26	"Final Conflict" (Battle of the Lunar League, Part 5)	Peter Lepenniotis & Tim Deacon	Eric Trueheart	December 25, 2011	March 8, 2014
Dr. Tommy arrives to help Blip understand his origins and control his "Super Mode". After a brief battle between ex-friends, Blip and Bolts finally reunite to fight together in the final battle against Dr. Blood. In the end, Dr. Blood is defeated, and Saedee reveals her true feelings for Blip. The final scene is shown all of the robots welcome the arrival of the first children on the Moon.
