= Dwayne Hill =

Canadian voice actor

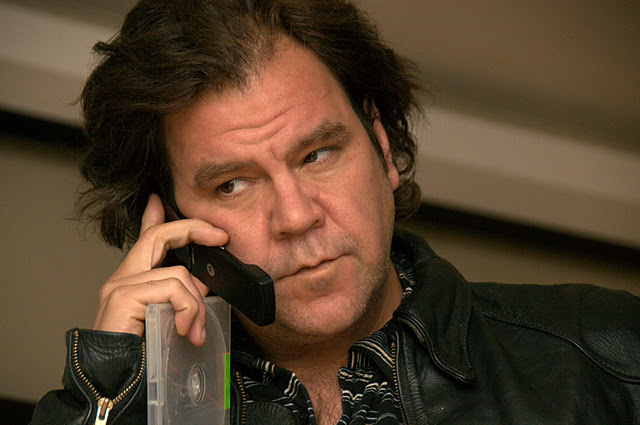
- Hill in 2011
- Born: June 5, 1966 (age 60)
- Occupation: Actor
- Years active: 1997–present
- Awards: Gemini (Best ensemble 2009)

Dwayne Hill (born June 5, 1966) is a Canadian actor. In 2009, he was nominated for two Gemini awards, one in the solo category for Grossology, the other, which he won, was for best ensemble in Atomic Betty. Overall, he has voiced over 20 animated series, playing hundreds of voices as well as voicing over 100 commercials each year. He voiced Cat in the PBS animated series Peg + Cat, which was nominated for an Emmy Award among the best performances in animated series.

== Career ==
Hill's biggest on-camera roles include playing Coach Carr in Mean Girls, The Safety of Objects which premiered at the 2001 Toronto International Film Festival, and The Truth About the Head, which won three awards at the 2003 Cannes film festival including the Kodak short film award. Hill has appeared in over 100 commercials, including the Bud Light spot "Mr. Silent Killer Gas Passer" for the Real Men of Genius campaign, which won a Gold Clio in Cannes. From 1997 to 2003, Hill played Mr. Voiceman, the off-camera announcer on the YTV game show Uh Oh!.

== Roles ==
- Daniel Spellbound – Tyson
- Peg + Cat – Cat
- Grojband – Buzz Newsworthy, Metrognome, Torbo, Gary
- Babar and the Adventures of Badou – Heropotamus
- Scaredy Squirrel – Hatton
- Jimmy Two-Shoes – Samy
- Yin Yang Yo! – Dave
- Pandalian – Abby and Gold
- Dex Hamilton: Alien Entomologist – Dex Hamilton
- Skatoony – Hoo the Gorillia, Colonel Zeppo
- Atomic Betty – Minimus P.U., B-1, Spindly Tam Kanushu, Roger, Dodger
- Jacob Two-Two – Principal I.M. Greedyguts
- Seven Little Monsters – Three
- Marvin the Tap-Dancing Horse – Fast-Talking Jack
- Maggie and the Ferocious Beast – Nedley
- Dumb Bunnies – Bill Uppity
- Braceface – Dr. Hertz
- Total Drama Action/Total DramaRama – Josh
- Stoked – Buster
- Moville Mysteries – Coach Coach Konkout
- Willa's Wild Life – Inky the Penguin, Burt the Bear, Wallace the Walrus, Lou the Elephant, Dr. Fector, Mr. Tremble
- The Nut Job 2: Nutty by Nature – Police Officer, additional voices
- Norman Picklestripes – Norm
- Mean Girls – Coach Carr
- Bolts & Blip – Dr. Tommy, Klank Lockton, Lock Clankton
- The Day My Butt Went Psycho! – Additional voices
- Numb Chucks – Additional voices
