= ToonBox Entertainment =

Canadian animation studio

- Type: Independent
- Industry: CGI Animation; Film; Television
- Genre: Various
- Founded: June 2008; 18 years ago
- Founder: Hong Kim
- Defunct: 2019; 7 years ago
- Fate: Bankruptcy. BDO Global became receiver.
- Successor: BDO Global
- Headquarters: 100 Broadview Ave Suite 400, Toronto, Ontario, Canada
- Key people: Hong Kim (President, CEO)
- Products: Feature films Television programs
- Website: www.toonboxent.com

ToonBox Entertainment was a Canadian animation studio, founded in June 2008, and is best known for its 2014 animated feature and its first film, The Nut Job.

The company officially ceased operations in late 2019 following financial difficulties and bankruptcy proceedings that resulted in the cancellation of future projects. The studio's remaining workforce subsequently moved to other productions, with many employees contributing to the 2019 film Arctic Dogs and other Canadian animation companies.

== Filmography ==
=== Feature films ===
==== Released films ====
#	Title	Release date	Budget	Gross	Rotten Tomatoes	Metacritic	Distributed by	Co-production with
1	The Nut Job	January 17, 2014	$30 million	$120.9 million	13%	37	The Weinstein Company (International); Open Road Films (United States); Warner Bros. Pictures (United Kingdom)	Endgame Entertainment; Redrover International; Gulfstream Pictures
2	Spark: A Space Tail	April 14, 2017	$40 million	$1.04 million	13%	21	Open Road Films	Redrover International; Gulfstream Pictures; Hoongman; Suning
3	The Nut Job 2: Nutty by Nature	August 11, 2017	$40 million	$68.7 million	14%	36	The Weinstein Company (International); Open Road Films (United States); Warner Bros. Pictures (United Kingdom)	RedRover; Hoongman; Open Road Films; Suning; Gulfstream Pictures

=== Cancelled projects ===
Title	Planned release date	Notes
Pecking Order	TBD	Collaboration with Gulfstream Pictures and Warner Bros. Pictures

=== Television series ===
#	Title	Premiere date	End date	Network
1	Bolts & Blip	June 28, 2010	December 25, 2011	Teletoon
2	The Beet Party	October 28, 2012	July 8, 2013	Yoopa
3	Nut Jobs!	TBD	TBD	
