= Cinesite Animation =

Canadian animation studio

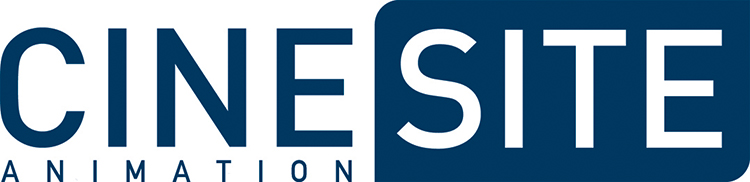

Cinesite Animation is a production and service animation studio based in Montreal, Quebec and Vancouver, British Columbia. It is part of Cinesite Studios, along with its partner company Cinesite VFX.

Cinesite officially announced the launch of its dedicated feature animation division on February 8, 2016. In March 2017 the Cinesite group acquired Vancouver-based animation studio Nitrogen Studios. In July 2022, the studio acquired Canadian animation studio L'Atelier Animation. In August 2022, it purchased a majority stake in Canadian animation studio Squeeze.

The company is currently in development on a slate of nine animated films, scheduled to be in production by 2020, in addition to service work for 3QU Media and Sony Pictures Animation.

== Feature films and shorts ==
The first of nine films announced as in development by Cinesite Animation are Harold Lloyd and Riverdance. The first, Harold Lloyd, in partnership with the Harold Lloyd Estate, is currently in pre-production and will be co-produced with Aniventure. An animated feature inspired by the stage show Riverdance is also in development, with Ireland's River Productions.

Cinesite Animation also has a slate deal with 3QU Media, to create several animated feature films. The first, Gnome Alone, directed by Peter Lepeniotis, which was released in 2018, after being delayed from 2017, with Charming starring Demi Lovato released in the same year. Cinesite also animated seasonal production The Star for Sony, released in November 2017.

In December 2013, Cinesite released "Beans", to showcase its creature animation skills. The 30-second animation went viral, amassing over 14 million views on YouTube and earning the opening slot in the 2014 SIGGRAPH Electronic Theatre. The animated short also won a gold award at the AEAF animation awards.

== Growth in Canada ==
In January 2014, with the support of Investissement Québec, Cinesite announced the opening of its studios in Montréal. Its initial employment target was reached 18 months early, in August 2015. On February 8, 2016, the opening of Cinesite's Animation division was announced in Montréal, Canada. The company subsequently announced its acquisition of Vancouver-based animation studio Nitrogen Studios in March 2017.

On February 8, 2016, Cinesite Animation announced the launch of Animate Montreal (Animez Montréal). The initiative, founded by Cinesite partnered with a group of associated companies, aims to help with upskilling, training and filling experience gaps, supporting the growth of the emerging Montréal animated film industry.

== Filmography ==
Year	Film title	Studio	Notes
2013	Beans	Aniventure	Short film
2017	Gnome Alone	Vanguard Animation	
2017	The Star	Sony Pictures Animation	
2018	Charming	Netflix / Vanguard Animation	
2019	Trouble	Netflix / Vanguard Animation	
2019	The Addams Family	Metro-Goldwyn-Mayer / Bron	
2020	Fe@rless	Netflix / Vanguard Animation	
2021	Extinct	Netflix / Huayi Brothers / HB Wink Animation	
2021	Mila	Aniventure	Short film
2021	Riverdance: The Animated Adventure	Netflix / Aniventure	
2021	The Addams Family 2	Metro-Goldwyn-Mayer / Bron	
2022	Paws of Fury: The Legend of Hank	Paramount Pictures / Nickelodeon Movies / GFM Animation / HB Wink Animation / Aniventure	
2023	Teenage Mutant Ninja Turtles: Mutant Mayhem	Paramount Pictures / Nickelodeon Movies / Point Grey Pictures	
2024	Iwájú	Walt Disney Animation Studios / Kugali Media	TV series
2024	Hitpig!	Aniventure	
2025	Smurfs	Paramount Pictures / Paramount Animation / LAFIG Belgium / IMPS	
2026	Animal Farm	Angel Studios / Aniventure / The Imaginarium Studios	
2026	Ray Gunn	Netflix / Skydance Animation	
TBA	Untitled Jack and the Beanstalk project	Netflix / Skydance Animation	
