= List of animated feature films of 2019 =

This is a list of animated feature films that were released in 2019.

== List ==
Animated feature films first released in 2019
Title	Country	Director	Production company	Animation technique	Notes	Release date	Duration
A Shaun the Sheep Movie: Farmageddon	United Kingdom	Richard Phelan; Will Becher	Aardman Animations; StudioCanal	Stop motion		September 22, 2019 (Odeon Leicester Square); October 18, 2019 (United Kingdom); February 14, 2020 (United States)	87 minutes
Abominable	United States; China	Jill Culton; Todd Wilderman	DreamWorks Animation; Pearl Studio	Computer		September 7, 2019 (TIFF); September 27, 2019	97 minutes
The Addams Family	Canada; United States	Greg Tiernan; Conrad Vernon	Metro-Goldwyn-Mayer Pictures; Bron Creative; Cinesite Studios; Cinesite Vancouver	Computer		October 11, 2019 (United States)	87 minutes
Alita: Battle Angel	United States	Robert Rodriguez	20th Century Fox; Lightstorm Entertainment; Troublemaker Studios	Computer / Live action		January 31, 2019 (Odeon Luxe Leicester Square, London); February 14, 2019	122 minutes
Alice-Miranda Friends Forever	Australia	Jo Boag	SLR Productions	Flash		November 14, 2019	83 minutes
The Angry Birds Movie 2	United States; Finland	Thurop Van Orman; John Rice	Rovio Animation; Sony Pictures Animation	Computer		August 2, 2019 (United Kingdom and Ireland); August 9, 2019 (Finland); August 14, 2019	97 minutes
Anpanman: Twinkle! Princess Vanilla of Ice Cream Land それいけ!アンパンマン きらめけ!アイスの国のバニラ姫	Japan	Hiroyuki Yano	Anpanman Production Committee; TMS Entertainment	Traditional		June 28, 2019	62 minutes
Arctic Dogs	United States; Canada; Italy; India	Aaron Woodley	AMBI Media Group; AIC Studios; TATATU; Assemblage Entertainment	Computer		November 1, 2019	93 minutes
Astro Kid; Terra Willy: Planète inconnue	France	Éric Tosti	TAT Productions; BAC Films; France Télévisions; OCS; Ciné+	CG animation		April 3, 2019	89 minutes
Away	Latvia	Gints Zilbalodis	Bilababa	Computer		June 4, 2019 (Animafest Zagreb)	75 minutes
Batman vs. Teenage Mutant Ninja Turtles	United States	Jake Castorena	Warner Bros. Animation; DC Entertainment; Nickelodeon	Traditional		March 31, 2019 (WonderCon Anaheim); May 14, 2019 (Digital)	84 minutes
Batman: Hush	United States	Justin Copeland	Warner Bros. Animation; DC Entertainment	Traditional		July 19, 2019 (San Diego Comic-Con); July 20, 2019	82 minutes
Bayala: A Magical Adventure	Germany; Luxembourg	Aina Järvine; Federico Milella	Fabrique d'Images; Ulysses Filmproduktion	Computer		May 1, 2019 (International Festival of Animated Film)	85 minutes
The Bears' Famous Invasion of Sicily; La Fameuse Invasion des ours en Sicile	France; Italy	Lorenzo Mattotti	Prima Linea	Traditional; Computer		May 21, 2019 (Cannes); October 9, 2019 (France); November 7, 2019 (Italy)	82 minutes
The Big Trip	Russia	Vasily Rovensky; Natalya Nilova	Licensing Brands	Computer		April 12, 2019	84 minutes
Birds of a Feather; Manou the Swift	Germany	Christian Haas; Andrea Block	LUXX Film	Computer		February 28, 2019	90 minutes
BoBoiBoy Movie 2	Malaysia	Nizam Razak	Animonsta Studios	Computer		August 8, 2019	110 minutes
Bombay Rose	India	Gitanjali Rao	Cinestaan Film Company	Traditional		August 28, 2019 (Venice); March 8, 2021	97 minutes
Boonie Bears: Blast Into the Past; Xiong chu mo: Yuan shi shi dai	China	Liang Ding; Huida Lin	Tianjiin Lechuang Pictures; Fantawild Pictures	Computer		February 5, 2019	90 minutes
Boxi and the Lost Treasure hu:Boxi a Film	Hungary	Béla Klingl; Áron Gauder; Péter Horog; Árpád Koós; József Sándor	KGB Studio	Computer	TV Movie	October 20, 2019 (M2 TV premiere)	61 minutes
Captain Sabertooth and the Magic Diamond; Kaptein Sabeltann og den magiske diamant	Norway; Belgium	Rasmus A. Sivertsen; Marit Moum Aune	Qvisten Animation	Computer		September 27, 2019	81 minutes
Chhota Bheem: Kung Fu Dhamaka	India	Rajiv Chilaka	Green Gold Animations	Computer		May 10, 2019	113 minutes
Children of the Sea	Japan	Ayumu Watanabe	Studio 4°C	Traditional		May 19, 2019 (Tokyo); June 7, 2019 (rest of Japan)	111 minutes
City Hunter the Movie: Shinjuku Private Eyes	Japan	Kenji Kodama	Sunrise	Traditional		February 8, 2019	95 minutes
Clara	Ukraine	Oleksandr Klymenko	Image Pictures	Computer		October 26, 2019	87 minutes
Code Geass: Lelouch of the Re;surrection	Japan	Goro Taniguchi	Sunrise	Traditional		February 9, 2019	114 minutes
Crayon Shin-chan: Honeymoon Hurricane ~The Lost Hiroshi~	Japan	Masakazu Hashimoto	Shin-Ei Animation	Traditional		April 19, 2019	100 minutes
Curious George: Royal Monkey	United States	Norton Virgien	Universal Animation Studios; Imagine Entertainment; Universal 1440 Entertainment; Tycoon Animation; BV Animation Studio	Flash		September 10, 2019	86 minutes
Dajjal The Slayer and His Followers	Pakistan; United Kingdom; Turkey; Malaysia; Indonesia; Jordan	Rana Abrar	WBJ Media; Messenger2050	Computer		December 2018	100 minutes
Detective Conan: The Fist of Blue Sapphire	Japan	Tomoka Nagaoka	TMS Entertainment	Traditional		April 12, 2019	109 minutes
Detective Pikachu	United States; Japan	Rob Letterman	Warner Bros. Pictures; Legendary Pictures; The Pokémon Company	Computer / Live action		May 3, 2019 (Japan); May 10, 2019 (United States)	104 minutes
Dora and the Lost City of Gold	United States	James Bobin	Paramount Players; Nickelodeon Movies; Walden Media; MRC; Burr! Productions	Computer / Traditional / Live action		August 9, 2019	102 minutes
Doraemon: Nobita's Chronicle of the Moon Exploration	Japan	Shinnosuke Yakuwa	Fujiko Pro; Shogakukan-Shueisha Productions; TV Asahi; Shin-Ei Animation; Asatsu-ADK	Traditional		March 1, 2019	111 minutes
Dragon Quest: Your Story	Japan	Ryūichi Yagi; Makoto Hanabusa	Shirogumi	Computer		July 16, 2019	102 minutes
Dumbo	United States	Tim Burton	Walt Disney Pictures; Tim Burton Productions	Computer / Live action		March 11, 2019 (Los Angeles); March 29, 2019 (rest of the United States)	112 minutes
Ejen Ali: The Movie	Malaysia	Usamah Zaid Yasin	WAU Animation	Computer		November 28, 2019	97 minutes
Elcano & Magellan: The First Voyage Around the World	Spain	Ángel Alonso	Dibulitoon Studio	Computer		March 23, 2019 (Málaga); July 5, 2019 (Spain)	90 minutes
The Elfkins – Baking a Difference	Germany; Austria	Ute von Münchow-Pohl	Akkord Film	Computer		October 8, 2019 (Schlingel); January 30, 2020	75 minutes
Fantastic Return to Oz; Урфин Джюс возвращается	Russia	Fyodor Dmitriev	Melnitsa Animation Studio	Computer		October 24, 2019	77 minutes
Fate/kaleid liner Prisma Illya: Prisma Phantasm	Japan	Shin Oonuma	Silver Link	Traditional		June 14, 2019	62 minutes
Fate/stay night: Heaven's Feel II. Lost Butterfly	Japan	Tomonori Sudō	Ufotable	Traditional		January 12, 2019	117 minutes
Fixies vs. Crabots; Фиксики против кработов	Russia	Oleg Uzhinov; Vasiko Bedoshvili	Aeroplane JSC; Blitz Films	Computer		December 19, 2019	83 minutes
Foodiverse; Chihuo Yuzhou	China	Liaoyu Chen; Paulette Victor-Lifton	Odin's Eye Entertainment	Computer		December 16, 2019	89 minutes 78 minutes (South Korea)
Fritzi – A Revolutionary Tale	Germany; Belgium; Luxembourg; Czech Republic	Ralf Kukula; Matthias Bruhn	Balance Film GmbH; TrickStudio Lutterbeck; Doghouse Films; Artémis Productions; MAUR Film	Traditional		September 30, 2019	86 minutes
Frozen 2	United States	Chris Buck; Jennifer Lee	Walt Disney Animation Studios	Computer		November 7, 2019 (Dolby Theatre); November 22, 2019	104 minutes
Funan	France; Belgium; Luxembourg; Cambodia	Denis Do	Les Films d'ici Sébastien Onomo; BAC Films	Computer		June 11, 2018 (Annecy International Animation Film Festival); March 6, 2019 (France); April 24, 2019 (Belgium)	84 minutes
GG Bond: Lollipop in Fantasy	China	Jinming Lu; Zhong Yu	WinSing Animation	Computer		July 5, 2019	85 minutes
Girls und Panzer das Finale: Part 2	Japan	Tsutomu Mizushima	Actas	Traditional		June 15, 2019	54 minutes
The Haunted House: The Sky Goblin VS Jormungandr 신비아파트 극장판 하늘도깨비 대 요르문간드	South Korea	Byun Young-kyu	CJ ENM; Studio BAZOOKA	Traditional		December 19, 2019	97 minutes
Hello World! Bonjour le monde!	France	Anne-Lise Koehler; Éric Serre	Kids First; Normaal Animation	Stop motion		October 2, 2019	67 minutes
Hello World	Japan	Tomohiko Itō	Graphinica	Traditional		September 11, 2019 (Kyoto); September 20, 2019	98 minutes
Homeless	Chile; Argentina	Jorge Campusano; José Ignacio Navarro; Santiago O'Ryan	Fábula; Laurent Lunes	Traditional; Flash		June 14, 2019 (Annecy); August 29, 2019 (Chile)	88 minutes
How to Train Your Dragon: The Hidden World	United States	Dean DeBlois	DreamWorks Animation	Computer		January 3, 2019 (Australia); February 22, 2019	104 minutes
I Lost My Body; J'ai perdu mon corps	France	Jérémy Clapin	Xilam	Traditional; Computer		May 17, 2019 (Cannes); November 6, 2019	81 minutes
Invader Zim: Enter the Florpus	United States	Jhonen Vasquez	Netflix; Nickelodeon Animation Studio	Traditional		August 16, 2019	71 minutes
Ivan Tsarevich and the Gray Wolf 4 Иван Царевич и Серый волк 4	Russia	Darina Schmidt; Konstantin Feoktistov	Melnitsa Animation Studio	Traditional		December 26, 2019	88 minutes
Jacob, Mimmi and the Talking Dogs; Jekabs, Mimmi un runajosie suni	Latvia; Poland	Edmunds Jansons	Atom Art; Letko	Traditional		July 20, 2019 (Giffoni Film Festival); September 21, 2019 (Kino Dzieci); October 1, 2019 (Latvia)	70 minutes
Justice League vs. the Fatal Five	United States	Sam Liu	Warner Bros. Animation; DC Entertainment	Traditional		March 29, 2019 (WonderCon Anaheim); March 30, 2019	77 minutes
Kiangnan 1894	China	Xiaogang Wu	SMG Pictures	Traditional		September 27, 2019	85 minutes
Klaus	Spain; United States; United Kingdom; Canada	Sergio Pablos	Netflix Animation Studios; Comic Animations; The SPA Studios; Atresmedia Cine; Yowza! Animation	Traditional; Computer		November 8, 2019	97 minutes
The Knight and the Princess	Egypt	Bashir el-Deek	Alsahar Animation	Traditional		September 19, 2019 (El Gouna Film Festival); January 29, 2020 (Cairo)	97 minutes
Kral Şakir: Korsanlar Diyari	Turkey	Haluk Can Dizdaroglu; Berk Tokay	Grafi2000; BKM	Computer		October 4, 2019	93 minutes
The Kuflis 2 Mi újság kuflik?	Hungary	Kristóf Jurik; Géza M. Tóth	KEDD Animation Studio	Computer		October 3, 2019	77 minutes
Latte and the Magic Waterstone	Germany; Belgium	Mimi Maynard	Netflix; Dreamin' Dolphin Film GmbH; Eagle Eye Filmproduktion; Grid Animation; Umedia; Simonsays Pictures	Computer		October 9, 2019 (Schlingel); December 25, 2019 (Germany); July 31, 2020 (Netflix); April 24, 2021 (United States)	82 minutes
The Legend of Hei; Luo Xiao Hei zhan ji	China	MTJJ	Mutou; Beijing Joy Pictures; MTJJ Animation; Beijing Jiyin Yinghua; Beijing Han Mu Chun Hua Animation	Traditional		August 27, 2019 (limited: selected Wanda & Hoyts Cinema in 28 cities); September 7, 2019	101 minutes
Lego DC Batman: Family Matters	United States	Matt Peters	Warner Bros. Animation; DC Entertainment; The Lego Group	Computer		July 21, 2019 (San Diego Comic-Con); August 20, 2019 (Digital, DVD and Blu-ray)	72 minutes
The Lego Movie 2: The Second Part	United States; Australia; Denmark	Mike Mitchell	Warner Animation Group; Lego System A/S; Rideback; Lord Miller Productions; Vertigo Entertainment; Animal Logic	Computer / Live action		February 2, 2019 (Regency Village Theatre); February 7, 2019 (Denmark); February 8, 2019 (United States); March 21, 2019 (Australia)	107 minutes
The Lion King	United States	Jon Favreau	Walt Disney Pictures; Fairview Entertainment; Moving Picture Company	Computer		July 9, 2019 (Hollywood); July 19, 2019 (United States)	118 minutes
Lotte and the Lost Dragons; Lotte ja kadunud lohed	Latvia; Estonia	Heiki Ernits; Janno Põldma	Eesti Joonisfilm; Rija Films	Traditional		January 4, 2019	78 minutes
Love Live! Sunshine!! The School Idol Movie: Over the Rainbow	Japan	Kazuo Sakai	Sunrise	Traditional		January 4, 2019	100 minutes
Lupin III: The First	Japan	Takashi Yamazaki	Marza Animation Planet; TMS Entertainment	Computer		October 18, 2019 (Tokyo Midtown Hibiya); December 6, 2019 (Japan)	93 minutes
Marona's Fantastic Tale; L'Extraordinaire Voyage de Marona	France; Belgium; Romania	Anca Damian	Aparte Film; Minds Meet; Sacrebleu Productions	Traditional		June 10, 2019 (Annecy International Animation Film Festival); January 8, 2020 (France)	92 minutes
Mewtwo Strikes Back: Evolution	Japan	Kunihiko Yuyama; Motonori Sakakibara	OLM Digital	Computer		July 4, 2019 (Los Angeles); July 12, 2019 (Japan)	98 minutes
Missing Link	United States	Chris Butler	Laika	Stop motion		April 5, 2019 (United Kingdom); April 12, 2019	94 minutes
Mosley	New Zealand	Kirby Atkins	Huhu Studios; China Film Animation	Computer		October 10, 2019	97 minutes
My Hero Academia: Heroes Rising 僕のヒーローアカデミア THE MOVIE ヒーローズ:ライジング	Japan	Kenji Nagasaki	Bones	Traditional		December 20, 2019	104 minutes
My Little Pony: Rainbow Roadtrip	Ireland; United States	Gillian Comerford	Boulder Media Limited; Allspark Animation	Flash		June 29, 2019	60 minutes
Ne Zha; Ne zha zhi mo tong jiang shi	China	Jiaozi	Yu Yang; Coco Cartoon; Horgos Coloroom Pictures; October Media	Computer		July 11, 2019 (Beijing); July 13, 2019 (IMAX, CFGS); July 26, 2019	110 minutes
Nimuendajú	Brazil; France; Germany	Tania Anaya	Anaya Produções; Zebra Cinema	Traditional		June 9, 2025	84 minutes
Ni no Kuni	Japan	Yoshiyuki Momose	OLM, Inc.	Traditional		August 23, 2019	106 minutes
Norm of the North: King Sized Adventure	United States	Richard Finn; Tim Maltby	Assemblage Entertainment; Dream Factory Group; Splash Entertainment	Computer		June 11, 2019	90 minutes
The Old Man; Vanamehe film	Estonia	Mikk Mägi; Oskar Lehemaa	BOP Animation	Stop motion		September 27, 2019	88 minutes
One Piece: Stampede	Japan	Takashi Otsuka	Toei Animation	Traditional		August 1, 2019 (premiere); August 9, 2019 (Japan)	101 minutes
On-Gaku: Our Sound	Japan	Kenji Iwaisawa	Rock’n Roll Mountain; Tip Top	Traditional		September 26, 2019	71 minutes
Osomatsu-san the Movie	Japan	Yōichi Fujita	Pierrot	Traditional		March 15, 2019	108 minutes
Peppa Celebrates Chinese New Year	United Kingdom	Dapeng Zhang	Astley Baker Davies Ltd; Entertainment One	Flash		February 5, 2019	81 minutes
Peppa Pig: Festival of Fun	United Kingdom	Neville Astley; Mark Baker	Astley Baker Davies Ltd; Entertainment One	Flash		April 5, 2019	68 minutes
Pets United	Germany; China; United Kingdom	Reinhard Klooss	Netflix; Joyhil Media and Culture; Screencraft Entertainment; Timeless Films; Eurosino Entertainment GmbH; China Film Group; Fish Blowing Bubbles; PlayArte Pictures	Computer		November 8, 2019	92 minutes
The Pilgrim's Progress	United States	Robert Fernandez	Cat In The Mill Studio	Computer		April 18, 2019	113 minutes
Pinkfong & Baby Shark's Space Adventure	South Korea; United States; Malaysia	Byeon Hee-sun; Jinyoung Jung; Nayoon Kim	CJ Entertainment; Pinkfong; SmartStudy	Computer		December 12, 2019 (Singapore); January 30, 2020 (South Korea); January 15, 2021 (Netflix); October 9/10, 2021 (United States); December 22, 2021 (YouTube); December 25, 2021 (EBC Yoyo)	65 minutes
Playmobil: The Movie	France; United Kingdom; United States; Germany	Lino DiSalvo	DMG Entertainment; Morgen Studios; ON Animation Studios; Little Dragon; 2.9 Film Holding Ltd. Wild Bunch	Computer / Live action		June 10, 2019 (Annecy); August 7, 2019 (France)	99 minutes
Pororo Movie: Great Adventure on Treasure Island 뽀로로 극장판 보물섬 대모험	South Korea	Kim Hyun-ho; Yoon Chang-seop	Ocon Studios	Computer		April 25, 2019	79 minutes
Princess Emmy	France; Germany; Belgium; United Kingdom	Piet De Rycker}	Animationsfabrik; Red Kite Animations; Studio 100; Witebox	Traditional		March 28, 2019	78 minutes
The Prince's Voyage; Le Voyage du prince	France; Luxembourg	Jean-François Laguionie; Xavier Picard	Blue Spirit; Mélusine Productions	Traditional; Computer		June 11, 2019 (Annecy); December 4, 2019 (France)	77 minutes
Princess Principal 2: Episode 1	Japan	Masaki Tachibana	Studio 3Hz; Actas	Traditional		September 23, 2019	54 minutes
Promare	Japan	Hiroyuki Imaishi	Studio Trigger	Traditional		May 15, 2019 (Tokyo premiere); May 24, 2019 (general release)	112 minutes
Qiaohu and the Fantastic Flying Ship	China; Japan	Kawamura Tomohiro	Benesse	Computer	Also known as Shimajiro and the Fantastic Flying Ship in 2021	June 1, 2019	80 minutes
The Queen's Corgi; Royal Corgi	Belgium; United Kingdom	Ben Stassen	nWave Pictures; Belga Productions; Lionsgate UK	Computer		January 16, 2019 (L'Alpe d'Huez); April 3, 2019 (Belgium)	85 minutes
Rascal Does Not Dream of a Dreaming Girl	Japan	Sōichi Masui	CloverWorks	Traditional		June 15, 2019	89 minutes
Red Shoes and the Seven Dwarfs	South Korea	Sung-ho Hong	Locus Animation Studio	Computer		July 25, 2019 (South Korea); September 18, 2020 (United States)	92 minutes
Reign of the Supermen	United States	Sam Liu	Warner Bros. Animation; DC Entertainment	Traditional		January 13, 2019 (limited); January 15, 2019 (Digital download and Blu-ray)	87 minutes
Ride Your Wave	Japan	Masaaki Yuasa	Science SARU	Traditional		June 10, 2019 (Annecy); June 21, 2019	96 minutes
Rocko's Modern Life: Static Cling	United States	Joe Murray	Netflix; Nickelodeon Animation Studio	Traditional		August 9, 2019	45 minutes
Salma's Big Wish; Dia de muertos	Mexico	Carlos Gutiérrez Medrano	Metacube	Computer		March 8, 2019 (Festival Internacional de Cine en Guadalajara); February 5, 2020 (France)	88 minutes
SamSam	France; Belgium	Tanguy de Kermel	Folivari	Computer		December 7, 2019 (Annecy Festival); October 30, 2019 (France)	80 minutes
Scooby-Doo! and the Curse of the 13th Ghost	United States	Cecilia Aranovich Hamilton	Warner Bros. Animation; Hanna-Barbera	Traditional		February 5, 2019 (DVD and digital)	82 minutes
Scooby-Doo! Return to Zombie Island	United States	Cecilia Aranovich Hamilton; Ethan Spaulding	Warner Bros. Animation; Hanna-Barbera	Traditional		July 21, 2019 (San Diego Comic-Con); September 3, 2019	80 minutes (DVD)
The Secret Life of Pets 2	United States	Chris Renaud	Illumination	Computer		May 24, 2019 (United Kingdom); June 7, 2019	86 minutes
Sheep and Wolves 2: Pig Deal	Russia	Vladimir Nikolaev; Mikhail Babenko	Wizart Animation; CTB Film Company	Computer		January 24, 2019; August 10, 2020 (United Kingdom); January 29, 2021 (United States)	85 minutes
Shimajiro the Movie: Shimajiro and Ururu's Hero Island	Japan; Indonesia; China	Takamitsu Kawamura; Ryoji Aoki	Benesse; Toho; Sony Music Direct	Live action Traditional		March 15, 2019	58 minutes
The Snow Queen: Mirrorlands	Russia	Robert Lence, Aleksey Tsitsilin	Wizart Animation			December 21, 2018 (Poland, et al.); January 1, 2019	84 minutes
Sound! Euphonium: The Movie – Our Promise: A Brand New Day	Japan	Tatsuya Ishihara	Kyoto Animation	Traditional		April 19, 2019	100 minutes
Spies in Disguise	United States	Nick Bruno; Troy Quane	Blue Sky Studios; Chernin Entertainment	Computer		December 4, 2019 (El Capitan Theatre); December 25, 2019	102 minutes
Spycies	China; France	Guillaume Ivernel; Zhiyi Zhang	Lux Populi VFX iQIYI Motion Pictures	Computer		June 14, 2019 (Annecy); January 11, 2020	99 minutes
StarDog and TurboCat	United Kingdom	Ben Smith	Head Gear Films; Screen Yorkshire; Particular Crowd; Red Star 3D	Computer		December 6, 2019	90 minutes
Steven Universe: The Movie	United States	Rebecca Sugar; Joe Johnston (co); Kat Morris (co)	Cartoon Network Studios	Traditional		September 2, 2019	82 minutes
Strike	United Kingdom	Trevor Hardy	Gigglefish	Stop Motion		December 16, 2018 (Carrefour du Cinéma d'Animation); March 16, 2019	100 minutes
Sumikko Gurashi: Good to Be in The Corner	Japan	Mankyū	Fanworks	Traditional		November 8, 2019	66 minutes
The Swallows of Kabul; Les Hirondelles de Kaboul	France; Switzerland; Luxembourg; Monaco	Zabou Breitman; Eléa Gobbé-Mévellec	Les Armateurs; Mélusine Productions Studio 352; Close Up Films	Traditional		May 16, 2019 (Cannes); September 4, 2019 (France)	81 minutes
The Swan Princess: Kingdom of Music	United States	Richard Rich	Sony Pictures Home Entertainment; Crest Animation Productions	Computer		August 6, 2019	82 minutes
Teen Titans Go! vs. Teen Titans	United States	Jeff Mednikow	Warner Bros. Animation; DC Entertainment	Flash		July 21, 2019 (San Diego Comic-Con); September 24, 2019	77 minutes
Tito and the Birds; Tito e os Pássaros	Brazil	Gustavo Steinberg, Gabriel Bitar, André Catoto	Bits Producoes			June 11, 2018 (Annecy International Animation Film Festival); February 14, 2019 (Brazil)	73 minutes
Toy Story 4	United States	Josh Cooley	Pixar Animation Studios	Computer		June 11, 2019 (El Capitan Theatre); June 21, 2019	100 minutes
Trouble	United States; Canada	Kevin Johnson	Netflix; Vanguard Animation; 3QU Media; Comic Animations; WV Enterprises	Computer		August 8, 2019 (Thailand); May 28, 2021 (United States); March 2, 2022 (Turkey)	87 minutes
Turu, the Wacky Hen	Spain; Argentina	Eduardo Gondell; Víctor Monigote	Argentina Sono Film S.A.C.I. Brown Films AIE; Gloriamundi Producciones	Computer		September 21, 2019 (SSIFF); January 1, 2020 (Spain)	80 minutes
UglyDolls	United States; Canada; China	Kelly Asbury	STX Family; Reel FX Animation Studios; Alibaba Pictures; Original Force; Troublemaker Studios	Computer		May 3, 2019	87 minutes
Upin & Ipin: Keris Siamang Tunggal; Upin & Ipin: The Lone Gibbon Kris	Malaysia	Ahmad Razuri Roseli; Adam Amiruddin; Syed Nurfaiz Khalid; Syed Ibrahim	Les' Copaque Production	Computer		March 21, 2019	100 minutes
Violet Evergarden: Eternity and the Auto Memory Doll ヴァイオレット・エヴァーガーデン 外伝 - 永遠と自動手記人形	Japan	Haruka Fujita	Kyoto Animation	Traditional		August 3, 2019 (Germany); September 6, 2019 (Japan)	90 minutes
Weathering with You; Tenki no Ko	Japan	Makoto Shinkai	CoMix Wave Films	Traditional		July 19, 2019	112 minutes
White Snake 白蛇：缘起 (Bai she: yuan qi)	China	Amp Wong	Light Chaser Animation Studios; Warner Bros.	Computer		January 11, 2019	99 minutes
The Wishmas Tree	Australia	Ricard Cussó	Like a Photon Creative	Computer		October 5, 2019 (Brisbane International Film Festival); February 27, 2020	90 minutes
The Wonderland	Japan	Keiichi Hara	Fuji TV; Dentsu; Aniplex	Traditional		April 26, 2019	115 minutes
Wonder Woman: Bloodlines	United States	Sam Liu; Justin Copeland	Warner Bros. Animation; DC Entertainment	Traditional		October 5, 2019	79 minutes
Wonder Park	Spain; United States	Dylan Brown (uncredited)	Paramount Animation; Nickelodeon Movies; Ilion Animation Studios; Sunswept Entertainment	Computer		March 15, 2019 (United States); April 12, 2019 (Spain)	85 minutes

== Highest-grossing animated films ==
The following is a list of the 10 highest-grossing animated feature films first released in 2019.

Rank	Title	Distributor	Worldwide gross	Ref
1	The Lion King	Walt Disney Pictures	$1,656,943,394	
2	Frozen 2	Walt Disney Pictures	$1,450,026,933	
3	Toy Story 4	Walt Disney Pictures	$1,073,394,593	
4	Ne Zha	Beijing Enlight Pictures	$729,957,704	(Note: Ne Zha Gross: China – $723,650,000; United States, United Kingdom, Australia, New Zealand, and Vietnam – $6,307,704)
5	How to Train Your Dragon: The Hidden World	Universal Pictures	$521,799,505	
6	The Secret Life of Pets 2	Universal Pictures	$430,051,293	
7	The Addams Family	United Artists Releasing	$203,044,905	
8	The Lego Movie 2: The Second Part	Warner Bros.	$199,603,202	
9	Weathering with You	Toho	$195,361,925	(Note: Weathering with You Gross: Japan – $129,853,779; Australia, China, Hong Kong, New Zealand, Russia/CIS, South Korea, Ukraine, and Vietnam – $50,544,266; USA – $7,797,481; Taiwan – $5,411,789; Thailand – $770,569; Singapore – $755,000; India – $169,396)
10	Abominable	Universal Pictures	$189,776,004	

In June, Toy Story 4 set the record for the biggest opening for an animated film, with $244.5 million. However, the record was surpassed by The Lion King the following month, which grossed $246 million. The latter then become the fastest animated film to gross $1 billion worldwide doing so in 21 days, surpassing Incredibles 2 (46 days), and on August 11, it surpassed Frozen to become the highest-grossing animated film of all time in only 31 days. Ne Zha is currently the highest-grossing fully Chinese produced animated film of all time. Frozen 2 set the record as the biggest opening weekend for an animated with $350.2 million worldwide. 2019 is the first year when 3 animated films surpassed $1 billion.

== See also ==
- List of animated television series of 2019
