= Manny Guevara =

American singer (born 1976)

"Manny Streetz" Guevara
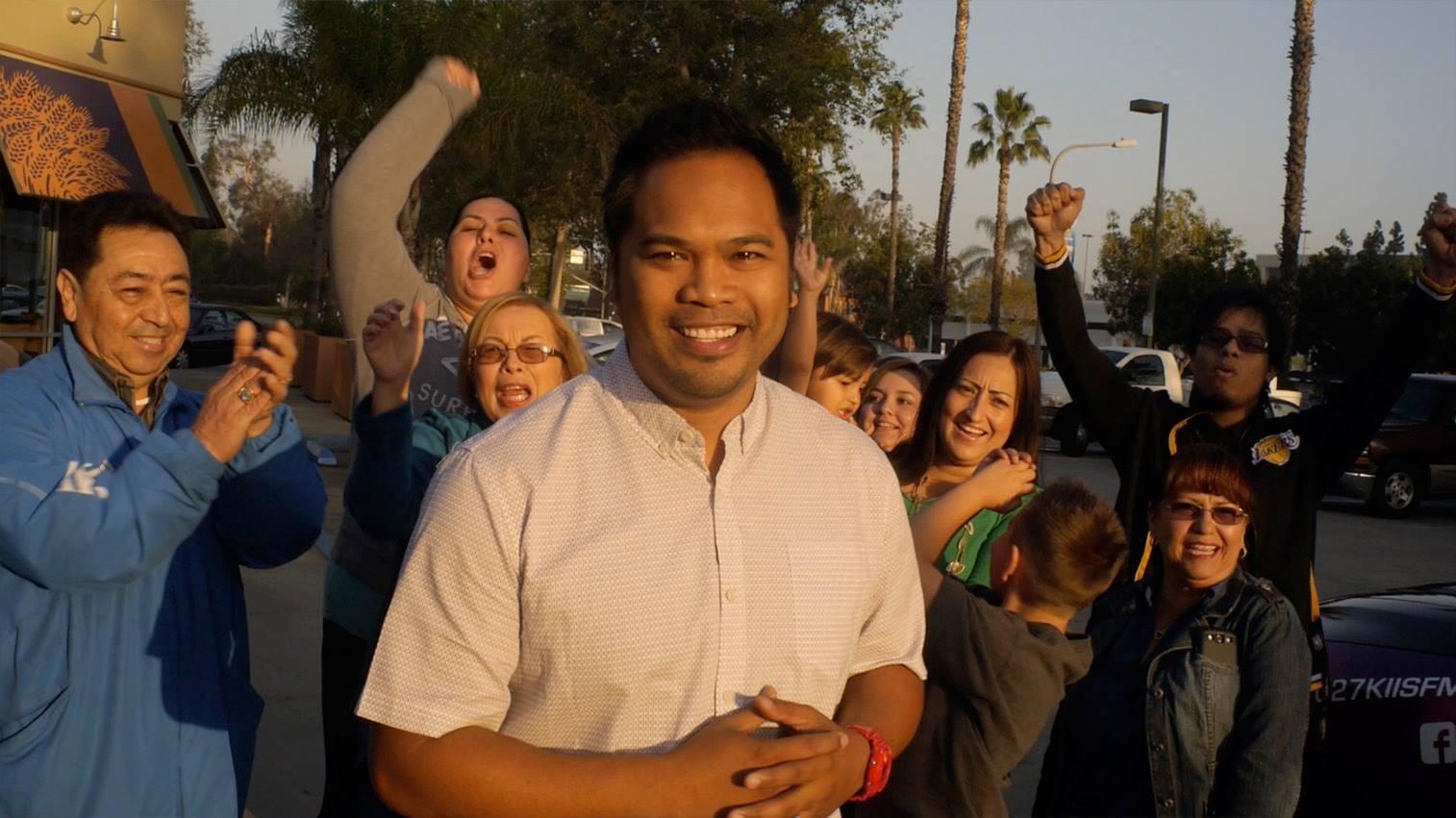

Background information
- Born: October 16, 1976 (age 49); Yokosuka, Japan
- Genres: Pop, rock, R&B, soul, alternative dance, hip hop
- Occupations: Singer, songwriter, arranger, vocal producer, A&R, television producer, record producer
- Instruments: Piano, guitar, cello, bass, drums, triangle, vocals
- Years active: 1998-present

Manny Guevara (born October 16, 1976), also known by the stage name Manny Streetz, is a Filipino-American radio & TV personality, actor, songwriter, film producer, television producer, and record producer.

== Career ==
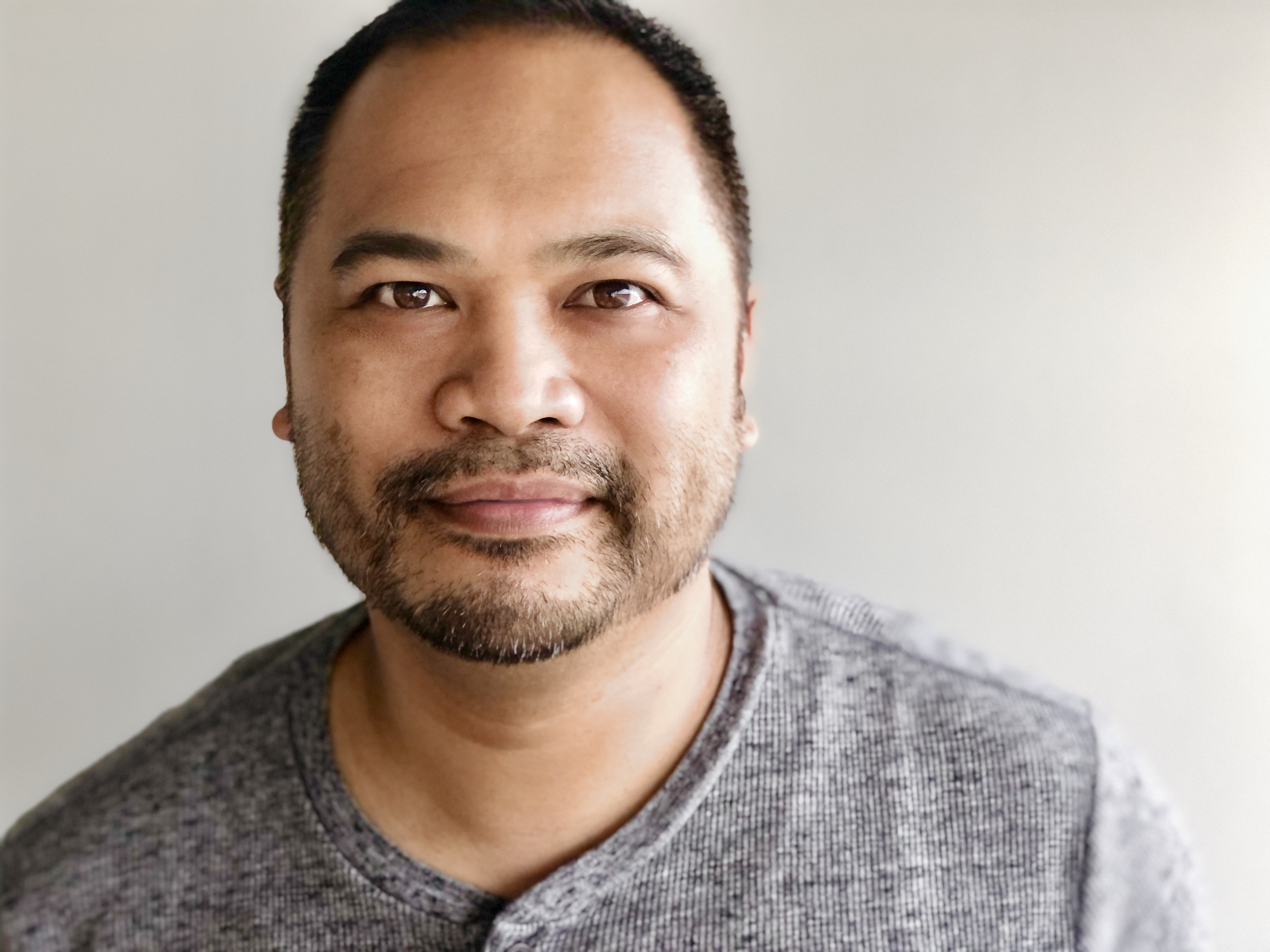

Streetz is professionally also known as "Manny on the Streetz" as an on-air personality with the Ryan Seacrest radio morning show, On Air with Ryan Seacrest, on the top rated top billing radio station in the world, 102.7 KIIS-FM. He was also a radio personality at 97.9 Radio NOW (WNWW) Jacksonville, FL on his own radio show. He also hosts the SoCal Community Council radio show which airs on numerous iHeartRadio stations including 102.7 KIIS-FM, Real 92.3 and KLAC. He's guest-starred on TV Shows like Dollhouse starring Eliza Dushku and Sam & Cat with Teen Pop Superstar Ariana Grande. He has also appeared in national commercials for Budlight, Buffalo Wild Wings, Turbo Tax and AMP Energy Drinks. As of December 2017, he is now a host at Radio Disney.

Streetz has worked on music projects ranging from Raven-Symoné, Frankie J, Interscope Recording Artist Ya Boy, Samantha Jade, School Boy Humor, Hollywood Records' band "Allstar weekend", and NMD (Howie D of BSB's girl group) among others. Manny has also worked with Multi-Grammy winning songwriter Diane Warren and producers J& Sweet who have written for Jennifer Lopez, as well as teamed up with his brothers, Marvz & Mike Bangum to form the Beat Kadetz. Other prominent songwriters and producers Streetz has worked with include Andre Merritt, Rob. A, Silkk the Shocker, Eddie Galan of Mach 1 Music, Marc Nelson, David Kater, Eric D-Lux of KPWR, Ryan and Smitty, Danja Handz, Da Internz and Nick James.

As an actor, Manny has appeared as a co-star in the short-lived ABC Studios TV series Mixology. The series was co-created by Jon Lucas & Scott Moore, who also serves as co-executive producers with Ryan Seacrest and Nina Wass for Ryan Seacrest Productions and ABC Studios. The series was greenlighted by ABC. Manny will also be a co-star in the comedy Legit for FXX, created by Jim Jefferies, and will co-star in Playing House (TV series). In fall of 2014, Manny Streetz was one of 20 finalists who were chosen out of over 7500 submissions to participate in the well known ABC Diversity Talent Showcase produced by ABC Studios, where they will be mentored by ABC Casting Execs such as, Keli Lee, Claudia Lyon, Jessie, Patricia Yuen Kern, Peachy, and John Villacorta.

As a Film Producer, Manny executive produced the short film, Free Lunch, with Ricky Horne Jr. and Cory Hardrict, which won "Best Short Film" at the North Carolina Black Film Festival. He is also developing several television projects & webseries under his production company Silent String Entertainment.

== Release ==
Gnome Alone, The film was originally set for an October 13, 2017 release, but on October 12, 2017, the film was pushed back to March 2, 2018. However, the film was not released on that date. The film was finally released on April 20, 2018, in Latin America, Europe, and Asia. It was later announced to be released on October 19, 2018, via Netflix in the United States.

Charming, The film was postponed for an undisclosed time from 2017 to the spring of 2018, despite the filming, recording and production having been completed in December 2017. Although Vanguard Animation never officially announced a release date, it was released on April 20, 2018, in Spain and throughout the year in Europe and Africa.

It was released in the United Kingdom on August 2, 2019.

== Personal life ==
Manny Streetz is the son of Vicenta, a missionary, and Manuel, a retired Naval Officer and retiring United States Postal Service Mail Handler. Streetz was raised in Jacksonville, Florida. He studied music business at Valencia College in Orlando, FL and began his career in entertainment right after college.

He is married to Angela Guevara and has three children, Michael Guzzo, Isabel and Joshua and reside in Ventura County.

== Discography ==
Year	Song	Artist	Record Label
2010	*She Totally Wants Me: Love Hook	Allstar weekend	Hollywood Records
2010	ElectroFunk	Qwes Kross	5050/Konvict Records
2010	Keeper; Show Me; You Can Have Her; The World Revolves Around You; Blonde Hair, Blue Eyes; California Love	School Boy Humor	Show Me EP California Love - Single
2010	Underconstruction	Jasmine Villegas	Epic Records
2010	Crush	Frankie J	SoulSick Records
2010	Tears in a Bottle	Frankie J	SoulSick Records
2010	So Incredible	Frankie J	SoulSick Records
2008	Rideout	Samantha Jade	Jive Records
2010	Bring It Back	Ya Boy	BlackCard/Konvict/Interscope
2010	Save Me	Savvy and Mandy	
2011	*Get Down: Love Me; Only You	J. Lewis	Blackground/Interscope
2011	*Stay*	Mayra Veronica	MVA Records
2012	*Blowin My Speakers feat DK: Airforce Music; Boomerang; Microwave feat DK; So Last Year	Silkk the Shocker	Da Beat Kadetz - No Limit
2013	*Whoop (Werk): Hank McCoy	Eliott King	Da Beat Kadetz - Silent String Entertainment
2018	Charming	J. Marie	Silent String Entertainment (Charming Soundtrack)
2018	Found My Way	J. Marie	Silent String Entertainment (Gnome Alone Soundtrack)

== Films ==
Year	Title	Role	Notes
2000	Oliver Twisted	Kevin	Florida Film Investment Company
2013	First Glance Movie	Don	Paramount Pictures
2018	Charming	Music Producer	WV Enterprises/Cinesite/3QU/Vanguard Animation
2018	Gnome Alone	Music Producer	WV Enterprises/Cinesite/3QU/Vanguard Animation
2019	Trouble	Landlord	WV Enterprises/Cinesite/3QU/Vanguard Animation
2020	The Way Back	Construction Worker	Warner Bros. Pictures

== Television ==
Year	Title	Role	Producer
2015	Gorgeous Morons	PA	ABC Family
2014	Mixology	Hawaiian	ABC Studios
2014	Sam & Cat	Greg	Nickelodeon
2014	I'm Asian American and...	Himself	Myx TV; Thirsty Tiger Television
2013	Biggest Dance Battle (Reality Show) in Development	Creator/Exec Producer/Host	Silent String Entertainment
2013	Beyond Access in Development	Creator/Exec Producer/Host	Silent String Entertainment
2012	Boys & Girls (Talk Show) in Development	Creator/Exec Producer/Host	Silent String Entertainment/LJ, Inc.
2011	The Young and the Restless	Florist	CBS
2010	iCarly	Manny Streetz	Nickelodeon
2009	Dollhouse	Stage Manager	Fox
2007	Idol Tonight	Guest Correspondent	TV Guide Network
