= Saturn Award for Best Animated Film =

Film award

- Awarded for: Best animated motion picture of the year
- Country: United States
- Presented by: Academy of Science Fiction, Fantasy and Horror Films
- First award: 1978 (awarded to Watership Down for Best Animated Film) and 2025(awarded to Demon Slayer: Kimetsu no Yaiba – The Movie: Infinity Castle for Best International Animated Film)
- Currently held by: Zootopia 2 for Best Animated Film and Demon Slayer: Kimetsu no Yaiba – The Movie: Infinity Castle for Best International Animated Film(2025)
- Website: www.saturnawards.org

The Saturn Award for Best Animated Film (formerly Saturn Award for Best Animation) is one of the annual awards given by the American professionnel organization, the Academy of Science Fiction, Fantasy and Horror Films. The Saturn Awards, which are the oldest film-specialized awards to reward science fiction, fantasy, and horror achievements (the Hugo Award for Best Dramatic Presentation, awarded by the World Science Fiction Society who reward science fiction and fantasy in various media, is the oldest award for science fiction and fantasy films), included the Best Animated Film category for the first time only in 1978, was revived in 1982, and still currently reactivated since 2002.

It is one of the oldest awards to reward animated films. This award has been achieved sixteen times, including ten times to Pixar films.

== Winners and nominees ==
=== Early years ===
| Year | Film | Ref. |
|---|---|---|
| 1978 (6th) | Watership Down | |
| 1982 (10th) | The Secret of NIMH | |
| 1982 (10th) | The Last Unicorn | |
| 1982 (10th) | Les Maîtres du temps | |
| 1982 (10th) | Phoenix 2772 | |
| 1982 (10th) | Tron | |

=== 2000s ===
| Year | Film | Ref. |
|---|---|---|
| 2002 (29th) | Spirited Away | |
| 2002 (29th) | Ice Age | |
| 2002 (29th) | Lilo & Stitch | |
| 2002 (29th) | Treasure Planet | |
| 2003 (30th) | Finding Nemo | |
| 2003 (30th) | Brother Bear | |
| 2003 (30th) | Looney Tunes: Back in Action | |
| 2003 (30th) | Sinbad: Legend of the Seven Seas | |
| 2004 (31st) | The Incredibles | |
| 2004 (31st) | The Polar Express | |
| 2004 (31st) | Shark Tale | |
| 2004 (31st) | Shrek 2 | |
| 2005 (32nd) | Corpse Bride | |
| 2005 (32nd) | Chicken Little | |
| 2005 (32nd) | Hoodwinked | |
| 2005 (32nd) | Howl's Moving Castle | |
| 2005 (32nd) | Madagascar | |
| 2005 (32nd) | Wallace & Gromit: The Curse of the Were-Rabbit | |
| 2006 (33rd) | Cars | |
| 2006 (33rd) | Flushed Away | |
| 2006 (33rd) | Happy Feet | |
| 2006 (33rd) | Monster House | |
| 2006 (33rd) | Over the Hedge | |
| 2006 (33rd) | A Scanner Darkly | |
| 2007 (34th) | Ratatouille | |
| 2007 (34th) | Beowulf | |
| 2007 (34th) | Meet the Robinsons | |
| 2007 (34th) | Shrek the Third | |
| 2007 (34th) | The Simpsons Movie | |
| 2007 (34th) | Surf's Up | |
| 2008 (35th) | WALL-E | |
| 2008 (35th) | Bolt | |
| 2008 (35th) | Horton Hears a Who! | |
| 2008 (35th) | Kung Fu Panda | |
| 2008 (35th) | Madagascar: Escape 2 Africa | |
| 2008 (35th) | Star Wars: The Clone Wars | |
| 2009 (36th) | Monsters vs. Aliens | |
| 2009 (36th) | A Christmas Carol | |
| 2009 (36th) | Coraline | |
| 2009 (36th) | Fantastic Mr. Fox | |
| 2009 (36th) | Ice Age: Dawn of the Dinosaurs | |
| 2009 (36th) | Up | |

=== 2010s ===
| Year | Film | Ref. |
|---|---|---|
| 2010 (37th) | Toy Story 3 | |
| 2010 (37th) | Despicable Me | |
| 2010 (37th) | How to Train Your Dragon | |
| 2010 (37th) | Legend of the Guardians: The Owls of Ga'Hoole | |
| 2010 (37th) | Shrek Forever After | |
| 2010 (37th) | Tangled | |
| 2011 (38th) | Puss in Boots | |
| 2011 (38th) | The Adventures of Tintin | |
| 2011 (38th) | Cars 2 | |
| 2011 (38th) | Kung Fu Panda 2 | |
| 2011 (38th) | Rango | |
| 2011 (38th) | Rio | |
| 2012 (39th) | Frankenweenie | |
| 2012 (39th) | Brave | |
| 2012 (39th) | ParaNorman | |
| 2012 (39th) | Wreck-It Ralph | |
| 2013 (40th) | Frozen | |
| 2013 (40th) | Despicable Me 2 | |
| 2013 (40th) | From Up on Poppy Hill | |
| 2013 (40th) | Monsters University | |
| 2014 (41st) | The Lego Movie | |
| 2014 (41st) | Big Hero 6 | |
| 2014 (41st) | The Boxtrolls | |
| 2014 (41st) | How to Train Your Dragon 2 | |
| 2014 (41st) | The Wind Rises | |
| 2015 (42nd) | Inside Out | |
| 2015 (42nd) | Anomalisa | |
| 2015 (42nd) | The Good Dinosaur | |
| 2015 (42nd) | Kung Fu Panda 3 | |
| 2015 (42nd) | Minions | |
| 2015 (42nd) | When Marnie Was There | |
| 2016 (43rd) | Finding Dory | |
| 2016 (43rd) | Kingsglaive: Final Fantasy XV | |
| 2016 (43rd) | Moana | |
| 2016 (43rd) | Sing | |
| 2016 (43rd) | Trolls | |
| 2016 (43rd) | Zootopia | |
| 2017 (44th) | Coco | |
| 2017 (44th) | The Boss Baby | |
| 2017 (44th) | Cars 3 | |
| 2017 (44th) | Despicable Me 3 | |
| 2017 (44th) | Your Name | |
| 2018/2019 (45th) | Spider-Man: Into the Spider-Verse | |
| 2018/2019 (45th) | The Grinch | |
| 2018/2019 (45th) | How to Train Your Dragon: The Hidden World | |
| 2018/2019 (45th) | Incredibles 2 | |
| 2018/2019 (45th) | Ralph Breaks the Internet | |
| 2018/2019 (45th) | Toy Story 4 | |
| 2019/2020 (46th) | Onward | |
| 2019/2020 (46th) | Abominable | |
| 2019/2020 (46th) | The Addams Family | |
| 2019/2020 (46th) | Frozen 2 | |
| 2019/2020 (46th) | Spies in Disguise | |
| 2019/2020 (46th) | Trolls World Tour | |

=== 2020s ===
| Year | Film | Ref. |
|---|---|---|
| 2021/2022 (50th) | Marcel the Shell with Shoes On | |
| 2021/2022 (50th) | The Addams Family 2 | |
| 2021/2022 (50th) | Encanto | |
| 2021/2022 (50th) | Lightyear | |
| 2021/2022 (50th) | Luca | |
| 2021/2022 (50th) | Minions: The Rise of Gru | |
| 2022/2023 (51st) | Spider-Man: Across the Spider-Verse | |
| 2022/2023 (51st) | Elemental | |
| 2022/2023 (51st) | Puss in Boots: The Last Wish | |
| 2022/2023 (51st) | The Super Mario Bros. Movie | |
| 2022/2023 (51st) | Suzume | |
| 2022/2023 (51st) | Teenage Mutant Ninja Turtles: Mutant Mayhem | |
| 2023/2024 (52nd) | The Wild Robot | |
| 2023/2024 (52nd) | The Boy and the Heron | |
| 2023/2024 (52nd) | Despicable Me 4 | |
| 2023/2024 (52nd) | Inside Out 2 | |
| 2023/2024 (52nd) | Kung Fu Panda 4 | |
| 2023/2024 (52nd) | Spy x Family Code: White | |
| 2023/2024 (52nd) | Transformers One | |
| 2024/2025 (53rd) | Zootopia 2 | |
| 2024/2025 (53rd) | The Bad Guys 2 | |
| 2024/2025 (53rd) | The Day the Earth Blew Up: A Looney Tunes Movie | |
| 2024/2025 (53rd) | Elio | |
| 2024/2025 (53rd) | KPop Demon Hunters | |
| 2024/2025 (53rd) | The SpongeBob Movie: Search for SquarePants | |

== Best International Animated Film ==
| Year | Film | Ref. |
|---|---|---|
| 2024/2025 (53rd) | Demon Slayer: Kimetsu no Yaiba – The Movie: Infinity Castle (Japan) | |
| 2024/2025 (53rd) | Attack on Titan the Movie: The Last Attack (Japan) | |
| 2024/2025 (53rd) | Chainsaw Man – The Movie: Reze Arc (Japan) | |
| 2024/2025 (53rd) | The Colors Within (Japan) | |
| 2024/2025 (53rd) | Ne Zha 2 (China) | |
| 2024/2025 (53rd) | Stitch Head (Germany) | |

== Records ==
=== Franchises ===
| Franchise | Wins | Nominations | Films |
|---|---|---|---|
| Finding Nemo | 2 | | Finding Nemo, Finding Dory |
| Spiderman | 2 | | Spider-Man: Into the Spider-Verse, Spider-Man: Across the Spider-Verse |
| Disney Princess | 1 | 5 | Tangled,Brave,Frozen,Moana,Frozen 2 |
| Shrek | 1 | 5 | Shrek 2, Shrek the Third, Shrek Forever After, Puss in Boots, Puss in Boots: The Last Wish |
| Cars | 1 | 3 | Cars, Cars 2, Cars 3 |
| Toy Story | 1 | 3 | Toy Story 3, Toy Story 4, Lightyear |
| Frozen | 1 | 2 | Frozen, Frozen 2 |
| Inside Out | 1 | 2 | Inside Out, Inside Out 2 |
| The Incredibles | 1 | 2 | The Incredibles, The Incredibles 2 |
| Zootopia | 1 | 2 | Zootopia, Zootopia 2 |
| Despicable Me | 0 | 6 | Despicable Me, Despicable Me 2, Minions, Despicable Me 3, Minions: The Rise of Gru, Despicable Me 4 |
| Kung Fu Panda | 0 | 4 | Kung Fu Panda, Kung Fu Panda 2, Kung Fu Panda 3, Kung Fu Panda 4 |
| How to Train Your Dragon | 0 | 3 | How to Train Your Dragon, How to Train Your Dragon 2, How to Train Your Dragon: The Hidden World |
| Disaster Trilogy | 0 | 2 | Your Name, Suzume |
| Ice Age | 0 | 2 | Ice Age, Ice Age: Dawn of the Dinosaurs |
| Looney Tunes | 0 | 2 | Looney Tunes: Back in Action, The Day the Earth Blew Up: A Looney Tunes Movie |
| Madagascar | 0 | 2 | Madagascar, Madagascar: Escape 2 Africa |
| The Addams Family | 0 | 2 | The Addams Family, The Addams Family 2 |
| Trolls | 0 | 2 | Trolls, Trolls World Tour |
| Wreck-It Ralph | 0 | 2 | Wreck-It Ralph, Ralph Breaks the Internet |

=== Studios ===
| Studios | Wins | Nominations | Films |
|---|---|---|---|
| pixar (Note: it also won this category consecutive 5 times from 30th saturn award to 35th saturn awards and again 3 times from 43rd saturn award to 45th saturn awards) | 10 | 23 | Finding Nemo, The Incredibles, Cars, Ratatouille, WALL-E, Up, Toy Story 3, Cars 2, Brave, Monsters University, Inside Out, The Good Dinosaur, Finding Dory, Coco, Cars 3, The Incredibles 2, Toy Story 4, Onward, Toy Story 4, Lightyear, Elemental, Inside Out 2, Elio |
| Dreamworks | 3 | 25 | Sinbad: Legend of the Seven Seas, Shark Tale, Shrek 2, Madagascar, Wallace & Gromit: The Curse of the Were-Rabbit, Flushed Away, Over the Hedge, Shrek the Third, Kung Fu Panda, Madagascar: Escape 2 Africa, Monsters vs. Aliens, How to Train Your Dragon, Shrek Forever After, Puss in Boots, Kung Fu Panda 2, How to Train Your Dragon 2, Kung Fu Panda 3, Trolls, The Boss Baby, How to Train Your Dragon: The Hidden World, Abominable, Trolls World Tour, Puss in Boots: The Last Wish, The Wild Robot, Kung Fu Panda 4, The Bad Guys 2 |
| Walt Disney Animation | 2 | 16 | Lilo & Stitch, Treasure Planet, Brother Bear, Chicken Little, Meet the Robinsons, Bolt, Tangled, Wreck-It Ralph, Frozen, Big Hero 6, Moana, Zootopia, Ralph Breaks the Internet, Frozen 2, Encanto, Zootopia 2 |
| Sony Pictures Animation | 2 | 4 | Surf's Up, Spider-Man: Into the Spider-Verse, Spider-Man: Across the Spider-Verse, KPop Demon Hunters |
| Warner Bros | 1 | 8 | Looney Tunes: Back in Action, The Polar Express, Corpse Bride, Happy Feet, Beowulf, Star Wars: The Clone Wars, Legend of the Guardians: The Owls of Ga'Hoole, The Day the Earth Blew Up: A Looney Tunes Movie |
| Studio Ghibli | 1 | 6 | Spirited Away, Howl's Moving Castle, From Up on Poppy Hill, The Wind Rises, When Marnie Was There, The Boy and the Heron |
| Laika | 1 | 4 | Corpse Bride, Coraline, ParaNorman, The Boxtrolls |
| Illumination | 0 | 9 | Despicable Me, Despicable Me 2, Minions, Despicable Me 3, Sing, The Grinch, Minions: The Rise of Gru, Despicable Me 4, The Super Mario Bros. Movie |
| Blue Sky | 0 | 5 | Ice Age, Horton Hears a Who!, Ice Age: Dawn of the Dinosaurs, Rio, Spies in Disguise |
| Paramount | 0 | 4 | Anomalisa, Teenage Mutant Ninja Turtles: Mutant Mayhem, Transformers One, The SpongeBob Movie: Search for SquarePants |
| Nickelodeon | 0 | 3 | Rango, Teenage Mutant Ninja Turtles: Mutant Mayhem, The SpongeBob Movie: Search for SquarePants |
| 20th Century Fox | 0 | 2 | The Simpsons Movie, Fantastic Mr. Fox |
| Aardman | 0 | 2 | Wallace & Gromit: The Curse of the Were-Rabbit, Flushed Away |
| Cinesite / MGM | 0 | 2 | The Addams Family, The Addams Family 2 |
| CoMix waves | 0 | 2 | Your Name, Suzume |
| Ketchup Ent. | 0 | 2 | Looney Tunes: Back in Action, The Day the Earth Blew Up: A Looney Tunes Movie |
| MAPPA | 0 | 2 | Attack on Titan the Movie: The Last Attack, Chainsaw Man – The Movie: Reze Arc |

=== Countries ===
| Country (Note: for Best International Animated Film) | Wins | Nominations | Films |
|---|---|---|---|
| Japan | 1 | 4 | Attack on Titan the Movie: The Last Attack,Chainsaw Man – The Movie: Reze Arc,The Colors Within ,Demon Slayer: Kimetsu no Yaiba – The Movie: Infinity Castle |
| China | 0 | 1 | Ne Zha 2 |
| Germany | 0 | 1 | Stitch Head |
