= Cinesite Vancouver =

Canadian animation company

- Formerly: Nitrogen Studios (2003–2017)
- Industry: Animation
- Founded: October 2003; 23 years ago
- Founders: Greg Tiernan; Nicole Stinn
- Headquarters: Vancouver, British Columbia, Canada
- Area served: Worldwide
- Key people: Nicole Stinn (president and CEO); Greg Tiernan (CCO)
- Owner: Greg Tiernan; Nicole Stinn
- Number of employees: 51 - 200
- Parent: Cinesite

Cinesite Vancouver (formerly known as Nitrogen Studios Canada, Inc. or Nitrogen Studios) is a Canadian animation company founded by husband and wife duo Greg Tiernan and Nicole Stinn. The company was founded in October 2003, in Vancouver, British Columbia.

On March 7, 2017, Nitrogen was acquired by British visual effects and feature animation studio company Cinesite, becoming their Vancouver operations.

Logo for Nitrogen Studios, the former name of Cinesite Vancouver

== Filmography ==
=== Feature films ===
==== Theatrical ====
Year	Title	Co-production	Notes
2006	Happily N'Ever After	Vanguard Animation; Berlin Animation Film; Berliner Film Companie; Odyssey Entertainment; Lionsgate	Additional animation with The LaB Sydney; Mr. X Bardel Entertainment; Elliot Animation; Quadriga FX
2016	Sausage Party	Point Grey Pictures; Annapurna Pictures; Columbia Pictures	
2019	The Addams Family	Metro-Goldwyn-Mayer; Cinesite Studios; The Jackal Group; United Artists Releasing; Bron Creative; United Artists Releasing	
2021	Extinct	Netflix; China Lion; HB Wink Animation; Huayi Brothers; Huayi Tencent Entertainment; Tolerable Entertainment; Cinesite; Timeless Films	Additional animation
2022	Paws of Fury: The Legend of Hank	Paramount Pictures; Nickelodeon Movies; Aniventure; Align; Brooksfilms; Flying Tigers Entertainment; GFM Animation; Cinesite; HB Wink Animation	Additional pre-production
2024	Hitpig!	Aniventure; Cinesite	Additional animation
2025	Animal Farm	Aniventure; The Imaginarium; Cinesite	Additional pre-production

==== Direct-to-Video ====
Year	Title	Co-production
2009	Thomas & Friends: Hero of the Rails	HIT Entertainment
2010	Thomas & Friends: Misty Island Rescue	HIT Entertainment
2011	Thomas & Friends: Day of the Diesels	HIT Entertainment
2012	Thomas & Friends: Blue Mountain Mystery	HIT Entertainment

=== Television ===
Premiere Date	End Date	Title	Channel	Note
January 25, 2010	December 25, 2012	Thomas & Friends	Channel 5	80 episodes: CGI series; animation production for HIT Entertainment
February 26, 2011	June 23, 2012	Dan Vs.	Hub Network	27 episodes: lip sync; co-produced with Film Roman, The Hatchery, and Starz Media
December 23, 2016	May 25, 2018	Trollhunters	Netflix	2 episodes: co-produced with DreamWorks Animation and Double Dare You
February 28, 2024		Iwájú	Disney+	animation service work: co-produced with Walt Disney Animation Studios, Kugali and Cinesite

=== Other projects ===
Year	Title	Medium
2005	God of War (uncredited)	Video game with Santa Monica Studio, Sony Computer Entertainment, and JP: Capcom
2008	Sonic Chronicles: The Dark Brotherhood	Video game with Bioware and Sega
2010	Kodee’s Canoe	Interactive app series
2021	Mila	Short with Peppermax Films, Pixel Cartoon, IbiscusMedia, Cinesite, and Aniventure

== Controversy ==
Several days after the release of Sausage Party, allegations of poor treatment of Nitrogen Studios employees surfaced in the comments section of an interview with Tiernan and co-director Conrad Vernon, featured on the website Cartoon Brew. Various anonymous posters, purporting to be animators who worked on the film in question, made claims including that Nitrogen forced them to work overtime for free and that some employees were threatened with termination. Some animators who complained or left due to stress went uncredited in the film. One poster stated that Tiernan had developed a reputation for "disturbing behaviour and abusive management style". Publications such as the Washington Post the Los Angeles Times and /Film have picked up the story.
