= Hitpig! =

2024 film by Cinzia Angelini and David Feiss

- American theatrical release poster
- Directed by: David Feiss; Cinzia Angelini
- Written by: Dave Rosenbaum; Tyler Werrin
- Story by: Berkeley Breathed
- Based on: Pete & Pickles by Berkeley Breathed
- Produced by: Adam Nagle; Peter Nagle; Dave Rosenbaum
- Starring: Jason Sudeikis; Lilly Singh; Anitta; RuPaul; Hannah Gadsby; Flavor Flav; Rainn Wilson
- Edited by: Rob Neal
- Music by: Isabella Summers
- Production companies: Aniventure; Cinesite; Rosebud Enterprises
- Distributed by: Kazoo Films (United Kingdom); Viva Pictures (United States); VVS Films (Canada)
- Release dates: 1 November 2024 (North America); 24 April 2026 (UK and Ireland)
- Running time: 85 minutes
- Countries: United Kingdom; Canada; United States
- Language: English
- Box office: $5.9 million

Hitpig! is a 2024 animated comedy film directed by Cinzia Angelini and David Feiss. The film comes from an original story by Berkeley Breathed, rooted from his 2008 children's book Pete & Pickles. Breathed also wrote the screenplay alongside Dave Rosenbaum and Tyler Werrin. Produced by Aniventure and animated by Cinesite, the film features the voices of Jason Sudeikis, Lilly Singh, Rainn Wilson, Anitta, RuPaul, Hannah Gadsby and Charlie Adler.

Hitpig! was released in North America on 1 November 2024, and was released in the United Kingdom and Ireland on 24 April 2026. It received mixed reviews from critics.

== Plot ==
Hitpig is an anthropomorphic pig whom elderly bounty hunter Big Bertha raised to retrieve lost pets and return them to their owners. When Bertha gets eaten by a crocodile, Hitpig is left traumatized from the event, but continues Bertha's work, taking on high-profile runaway animals for cash rewards.

One night, an elephant named Pickles escapes from the custody of the Leapin' Lord of the Leotard, a wealthy but unsuccessful Las Vegas showman, with the help of animal rights activist Letícia dos Anjos. Upon discovering Pickles' escape, the Leapin' Lord contacts Hitpig to capture Pickles before a big show he intends to open within a couple of days. Hitpig accepts his offer upon hearing about the million-dollar bounty.

Pickles is taken by Letícia to London, with the intent of transferring Pickles to India to find her family. Hitpig manages to track down Pickles and earns her trust when she mistakes Hitpig to be an ally of Letícia. However, Hitpig's catchvan gets towed, so the two are forced to take a flight back to Las Vegas. On the plane, Hitpig is spotted by Letícia, and the two engage in a dart battle over Pickles, who mistakenly opens the back door of the plane. Hitpig and Pickles are ejected from the plane and land at a roadside motel. The pair builds a makeshift vehicle to get back to Las Vegas, but they divert from the road when a hot air balloon festival distracts Pickles, forcing Hitpig to chase after her. They settle on using a hot air balloon as another means of transportation.

The two end up in San Francisco, where they crash land on the set of a cooking game show. Pickles helps Hitpig win by using her trunk as a hand after he breaks his. Developing complicated feelings towards Pickles, Hitpig has a dream about Bertha, who explains to him that helping others was the rewarding part of bounty hunting. Hitpig then saves Pickles from drowning in a flooded house by breathing into her trunk.

The next day, the Leapin' Lord finds Hitpig and Pickles and reveals to Pickles the truth about Hitpig, who still believes he is trying to take her to India, and forces Hitpig into taking the bounty. When Hitpig rejects the bounty, the Leapin' Lord intimidates him with his pet crocodile, Fluffy, who happens to be the same crocodile that ate Bertha, causing him to faint. Upon waking up, Hitpig decides to rescue Pickles. Letícia, who has taken control of Hitpig's catchvan, insists on helping, alongside other animals Hitpig had captured and Super Rooster, a superhero rooster. They make their way to the Leapin' Lord's palace, only to find out that the Leapin' Lord's show involves him shooting his palace into space so that he can successfully leap into Pickles‘ arms.

With the help of Super Rooster and a polecat's nuclear-powered farts, Hitpig and his team manage to catch up to the flying palace. Hitpig makes it to the main stage to rescue Pickles, but as he tries to fight Fluffy, the catchvan detaches from the palace's entrance hatch, ejecting the Leapin' Lord, Fluffy, and Hitpig. As Hitpig flies into space, Super Rooster gets ahold of the catchvan, reinstates it to the palace, and saves Hitpig. Hitpig takes the palace back to Earth safely. Sometime later, Hitpig brings Pickles to India.

One year later, Hitpig has opened a food truck in Italy. Pickles, unable to find her family in India, comes across his truck and declares that Hitpig and his friends are her true family. Hitpig decides to invite Pickles to help him save animals alongside Letícia, and they fly off in his catchvan. The Leapin' Lord and Fluffy, meanwhile, have flown high up in space directly into the Sun, where they are instantly incinerated.

== Voice cast ==
- Jason Sudeikis as Hitpig, a bounty-hunting pig
- Lilly Singh as Pickles, an elephant
- Rainn Wilson as the Leapin' Lord of the Leotard, a showman from Las Vegas
- Anitta as Letícia dos Anjos, an animal rights activist
- RuPaul as Polecat, a polecat with heterochromia
- Lorraine Ashbourne as Bertha, Hitpig's adopted mother and mentor
- Andy Serkis as a newscaster
- Shelby Young as Hitpig's catchvan
- Hannah Gadsby as Lola, a koala
- Charlie Adler as Super Rooster
  - Adler also voices Louis the Lobster
- Flavor Flav as Chef Emcee

== Production ==
Hitpig! was conceived by Berkeley Breathed as a film adaptation of his 2008 children's book Pete & Pickles. The film initially entered development at DreamWorks Animation in 2014 before being abandoned soon afterwards. Prior to the creation of Hitpig, Breathed had first attempted to adapt Pete & Pickles in 2010, as a computer-animated preschool series with Technicolor.

In 2020, it was announced that the British animation firm Aniventure would produce the film, with Cinzia Angelini and Maurizio Parimbelli directing. Shortly afterwards, Parimbelli would be replaced by David Feiss. Animation production was handled by Cinesite through its Montreal facilities as well as its Vancouver facilities.

In 2020, it was announced that Peter Dinklage, Lilly Singh, Rainn Wilson, RuPaul, Hannah Gadsby and Dany Boon had joined the cast. When David Feiss joined on as a director, Boon would exit the project, and would be recast by veteran voice actor and Feiss' former Cow and Chicken collaborator Charlie Adler, who also provides the voices for two other roles for the film. On March 8, 2022, it was announced that Anitta would be providing the voice for the character Letícia dos Anjos. In May 2024, it was reported that Jason Sudeikis would be playing the titular character, replacing Dinklage, while GFM Animation launched international sales. Isabella Summers composed the score for the film.

== Release ==
In August 2024, Viva Pictures acquired the United States rights and released the film for a theatrical release on 1 November 2024. VVS Films released the film in Canada on behalf of Viva Pictures. Kazoo released the film in the United Kingdom on 24 April 2026.

The film's US distribution rights were transferred to Sony Pictures Home Entertainment on January 9, 2026.

== Reception ==
=== Box office ===
In the United States and Canada, Hitpig! was released alongside Here and Absolution. The film debuted with $1.2 million from 2,107 theaters in its opening weekend, finishing 13th at the box office.

=== Critical response ===
On the review aggregator website Rotten Tomatoes, 52% of 23 critics' reviews are positive, with an average rating of 5.0/10. The website's consensus reads: "A loud, manic farce with a unique premise and lively animated characters, Hitpig! is intermittently entertaining but ultimately feels too chaotic and predictable." Audiences polled by CinemaScore gave the film an average grade of "B+" on an A+ to F scale.
