= Assemblage Entertainment =

Indian animation studio

Assemblage Entertainment Pvt. Ltd.
- Type: Private
- Industry: Computer graphics; Feature animation; Television animation
- Founded: 2013; 13 years ago
- Founder: AK Madhavan (MadMax)
- Headquarters: Mumbai, Maharashtra, India
- Number of locations: 2
- Key people: AK Madhavan aka MadMax (Founder & Director); Arjun Madhavan (CEO)
- Number of employees: 280+
- Parent: Cinesite (2022–present)
- Website: www.madassemblage.com

Assemblage Entertainment is an Indian animation and visual effects studio headquartered in Mumbai, founded in December 2013, by industry veteran AK Madhavan (fondly known as Madmax). The studio distributes animation productions of major Hollywood studios and other independent production companies from around the world.

== Background ==
In September 2015, Assemblage Entertainment completed work on its first feature animation film, Blinky Bill the Movie, a full-length feature film co-produced by Flying Bark Productions, Telegael.

Starting with a team of fewer than 20 artists in the suburbs of Mumbai, the company has grown rapidly into a studio of over 450 people, working on full-length features for global audiences. It has established itself as a leading independent player in animation, with numerous projects from global producers. The CEO of Google, Sundar Pichai mentioned Assemblage Entertainment as forebear of their Google Cloud Platform at the GCP Next Global User Conference on 23 March 2016.

The company also experiments with different types of film making. Recently, it ventured into short-film making with Living Idle.

== Visual effects ==
In 2021, the company set up their VFX unit and was one of the leading VFX studios to work on Rocketry: The Nambi Effect directed by R. Madhavan. The movie was premiered at the Cannes Film Festival and was appreciated by critics and audience alike. Assemblage also received a Filmfare Awards nomination for Best VFX in 2023.

=== Feature films ===
#	Title	Release date	Production companies	Distributor/Network
1	Blinky Bill the Movie	17 September 2015	Flying Bark Productions	Studio 100 (international sales) StudioCanal (Australia)
2	Norm of the North	15 January 2016	Splash Entertainment; Telegael	Lionsgate Films
3	Arctic Dogs	1 November 2019	AMBI Media Group; AIC Studios; TATATU	Entertainment Studios Motion Pictures
4	Sneaks	18 April 2025	Cinema Gypsy Productions; Lengi Studios; House of Cool; GFM Animation; Ashland Hill Media Finance; RTG Features; Rabbits Black; Waffle Iron Entertainment	Briarcliff Entertainment
5	Gabby's Dollhouse: The Movie	26 September 2025	DreamWorks Animation	Universal Pictures
6	Stitch Head	29 October 2025	Gringo Films; GFM Animation; Studio Rakete; Aniventure; Fabrique d'images Senator Film; Traumhaus Studios; Wild Bunch	Briarcliff Entertainment
7	Groove Tails	TBA	Imprint Entertainment; Aloe Entertainment	TBA
8	I, Chihuahua	TBA	Snafu Pictures; Mexopolis	TBA
9	Mooned	TBA	Whisper Pictures	TBA

=== TV series ===
#	Title	Release date	Network
1	Miraculous: Tales of Ladybug & Cat Noir	1 December 2018	TF1
2	Trollhunters	26 June 2019	Netflix
3	Chico Bon Bon: Monkey with a Tool Belt	8 May 2020	Netflix
4	Puffins	1 December 2020	Apple TV+
5	Super Giant Robot Brothers	4 August 2022	Netflix
6	Eureka!	4 August 2022	Disney Junior
7	S.M.A.S.H	22 August 2022	Max
8	Jipo & Baby Puffins	1 January 2024	Amazon Prime Video
9	Morphle and the Magic Pets	20 March 2024	Disney Junior
10	Press Start!	21 November 2024	Peacock
11	The Three Musketeers	1 March 2025	ZDF/France TV/RAI
12	Wolf King	20 March 2025	Netflix

=== Visual effects ===
#	Title	Release date
1	Rocketry: The Nambi Effect	1 July 2022
2	Chhaava	14 February 2025
3	Raja Shivaji	1 May 2026
4	G.D.N	7 August 2026
5	Eetha	December 4, 2026
6	Varanasi	7 April 2027

=== DVD ===
#	Title	Release date
1	Alpha and Omega 2: A Howl-iday Adventure	8 October 2013
2	The Swan Princess: Princess Tomorrow, Pirate Today	6 September 2016
3	The Swan Princess: Royally Undercover	28 March 2017
4	The Swan Princess: A Royal Myztery	27 March 2018
5	Norm of the North: Keys to the Kingdom	11 January 2019
6	Norm of the North: King Sized Adventure	11 June 2019
7	The Swan Princess: Kingdom of Music	6 August 2019
8	Norm of the North: Family Vacation	25 February 2020

=== Awards ===
Group	Category (Recipient)	Result
ANN Awards 2024	Best Preschool show for Morphle and the Magic Pets	Won
ANN Awards 2024	Best Animated Digital Series for Miraculous: Tales of Ladybug & Cat Noir	Won
ANN Awards 2024	Best Animated Series for Puffins Impossible	Won
ANN Awards 2024	Studio of the Year	Nominated
ANN Awards 2023	Best Preschool show for Eureka!	Won
ANN Awards 2023	Best Animated Digital Series for Booba	Won
ANN Awards 2023	Best animated series for Miraculous: Tales of Ladybug & Cat Noir	Won
ANN Awards 2023	Best Partnered Animation Work for Super Giant Robot Brothers	Won
Filmfare Awards 2023	Best VFX for Rocketry: The Nambi Effect	Nominated
ANN Awards 2025	Best Preschool show for Press Start!	Won
ANN Awards 2025	Best animated series for Wolf King	Won
ANN Awards 2025	Best Partnered Animation Work for Wolf King	Won
ANN Awards 2025	Best Animated Full Length Feature Film for Sneaks (film)	Won
ANN Awards 2025	Studio of the Year	Won
Zee Cine Awards 2026	Best VFX for Chhaava	Nominated
Indian National Cine Academy (INCA) Awards 2026	Best VFX for Chhaava	Nominated

==== Short films ====
- The FAB Gift of Life (2018)
