= I'm Asian American and... =

- Genre: Documentary
- Country of origin: United States
- No. of seasons: 1
- No. of episodes: 10

Production
- Executive producers: Valerie Chow; Stephen Goetsch; Miguel Santos
- Running time: 23 minutes (excluding commercials)
- Production company: Thirsty Tiger Television

Original release
- Network: Myx TV
- Release: April 23 – June 25, 2014

I'm Asian American and... is an American reality television series on Asian American cable network Myx TV. It features different stories about Asian Americans who break stereotypes associated with their community. The show is Myx TV's first original reality series. It premiered on April 23, 2014, and concluded on June 25, 2014.

== Episodes ==
No.	Title	Original release date
1	"I Want Reparations for Yellow Fever"	April 23, 2014
Comedian Kristina Wong goes on dates with white men who only date Asian girls.
2	"I'm a Dating Coach for Virgins"	April 30, 2014
Cancer survivor Ben Yip enlists dating coach DJ Fuji to help him lose his virginity.
3	"I'm a Living Doll"	May 7, 2014
Lolita fashion designer Cyril Lumboy discusses her struggles as a constant target of cyber-bullying.
4	"I'm Not Sure If I'm Really Asian"	May 14, 2014
Rapper Tristan Starchild takes a genetic test to find out what his ethnicity is.
5	"I'm a Triplet"	May 21, 2014
High schooler Tyler struggles being the only sibling in his family without autism.
6	"I Fight Human Trafficking"	May 28, 2014
A Thai-American lawyer sheds light into the fight against human trafficking in the United States.
7	"B*****s Love Me"	June 4, 2014
Dog walker Enrique Gamboa quits corporate America to focus on taking care of dogs.
8	"I'm Gender Queer"	June 11, 2014
Ali Santos discusses the struggles of being gender queer.
9	"I'm a Blonde"	June 18, 2014
Hollywood stylist Phu Styles pursued her dreams of being in the fashion industry much to the consternation of her traditional Vietnamese parents.
10	"I'm an Entertainment Ninja"	June 25, 2014
Radio personality Manny Guevara discusses his experience as a Filipino American trying to make it in the entertainment industry.

== Awards and nominations ==
- Third Place, Digital Marketing Tactics, 2014 NAMIC EMMA Awards.
- Nominee, Best Show or Series Other, 2014 CableFAX Program Awards.
- Nominee, Diversity Campaign or Initiative, 2014 Cynopsis Social Good Awards.
