= Extinct (film) =

2021 computer-animated adventure film

- Official poster
- Directed by: David Silverman
- Written by: Joel Cohen; John Frink; Rob LaZebnik
- Produced by: Joel Cohen; John Frink; Rob LaZebnik; Joe Aguilar; Matthew Berkowitz; Yanming Jiang; Wang Zhonglei
- Starring: Adam DeVine; Rachel Bloom; Zazie Beetz; Ken Jeong
- Edited by: Steven Liu
- Music by: Mick Giacchino
- Production companies: China Lion; HB Wink Animation; Huayi Brothers; Tolerable Entertainment; Cinesite; Timeless Films
- Distributed by: Huayi Brothers (China); Netflix (Worldwide)
- Release dates: February 11, 2021 (Russia); October 3, 2021 (China); November 19, 2021 (Worldwide)
- Running time: 84 minutes
- Countries: Canada; United States; China
- Languages: English; Chinese

Extinct is a 2021 animated science fiction comedy film directed by David Silverman, and co-directed by Raymond S. Persi, and written by Joel Cohen, John Frink, and Rob LaZebnik. The film features the voices of Rachel Bloom, Adam Devine, Zazie Beetz, Ken Jeong, Catherine O'Hara, Benedict Wong, Reggie Watts, and Jim Jefferies. The story follows Op and Ed, a pair of donut-shaped animals known as "flummels". They find themselves transported from their island home in the year 1835 to modern-day Shanghai.

Extinct was released in Russia on February 11, 2021. It was later released theatrically by Sky Cinema in the United Kingdom on August 20, 2021, and then was released worldwide on Netflix on November 19, 2021.

== Plot ==
Siblings Op and Ed, who are Flummels, a species of fluffy rabbit-like creatures with holes in their centers, are native to the Galápagos Islands. The flummels are ostracized by their community, due to Op's proneness to disaster, and are labelled weird. Just before Charles Darwin discovers their island during one of his voyages, Op and Ed find and fall into a large flower that teleports them to modern-day Shanghai, where they meet and befriend a white poodle named Clarance. The flummels learn their species is now extinct after Darwin found the island destroyed by a volcanic eruption.

Clarance brings them to the Time Terminal, a pavilion where Clarance's owner, Dr. Lee Chung, kept and studied the flowers and their seeds, which have time-traveling properties. Op accidentally knocks some seeds out, causing the Terminal to malfunction and sending Clarance to 1915 Antarctica, along with the seed that leads the flummels home. In Antarctica, Clarance is captured by Ernest Shackleton's expedition team. With the help of the Extinctables — a team of extinct animals composed of Dottie, a dodo bird; Burnie, a Tasmanian thylacine; Alma, a female Macrauchenia; and Hoss, a male Triceratops, who were brought by Dr. Chung to the Terminal — Op and Ed travel through each seed in order to find the one that can bring them home and rescue Clarance.

Following a falling out with Ed, Op returns to the flummels' time, where she attempts to warn the rest of the flummels about the volcano. Clarance imprisons her, telling her that flummels ruined his life and that he is actually behind their extinction. Clarance had been adopted by Dr. Chung, but after Dr. Chung was charmed by the adorable flummels, Clarance went Maverick, pushing Dr. Chung into one of the flowers and destroying the seed that would send him back. He then caused the flummels' extinction by planting a drone bomb. Following Ed's arrival after seeing the video Op made, they make several attempts to escape and stop the bomb, eventually deploying a seed to move the entire island into the present day. Clarance survives, but Dr. Chung arrives and punishes him by sending him back to 1915 Antarctica, thanking the flummels and the Extinctables.

A year later, Op and Ed are finally accepted by their community, while Dottie surprises Ed by laying a blueish egg shaped like a flummel. The egg hatches, but the creature inside the egg is unknown.

In a mid-credits scene, Op surprises Ed by pulling Wally into the Time Terminal. Wally exclaims that they have so much to talk about, while Op leaves to "get him a glass of water".

== Cast ==
- Adam DeVine as Edward "Ed" Flummel, a grumpy male grey flummel with blue eyes. He is Op's brother.
- Rachel Bloom as Oppy "Op" Flummel, a happy-go-lucky female brown and cream-coloured flummel with brown eyes. She is Ed's sister.
- Zazie Beetz as Dottie, a blue-feathered dodo-bird who is the leader of The Extinctables. She is Ed's love interest.
- Ken Jeong as Clarance, a white poodle dressed in a red sweater. He is an arch-enemy of Op and Ed.
- Benedict Wong as Dr. Lee Chung
- Jim Jefferies as Burnie, a thylacine ("Tasmanian tiger") who is a member of the Extinctables.
- Catherine O'Hara as Alma, a female Macrauchenia who is a member of the Extinctables.
- Reggie Watts as Hoss, a male Triceratops who is a member of the Extinctables / Ernest Shackleton.
- Nick Frost as Commander Robert FitzRoy, captain of HMS Beagle.
- Tom Hollander as Charles Darwin
- Henry Winkler as Jepson, a large, grey male flummel and Mali's son.
- Alex Borstein as Mali, a female brown flummel and Jepson's mother.
- Richard Kind as Wally, a talkative blue whale.
- Jon Lovitz as Conch
- Sydney Malmberg Liu as Bo
- Maria Bamford as Bo's Mom
- Raymond S. Persi as That Guy / Booby, a blue-footed booby.
- Terry Gross as Bomb (voice)
- David Silverman as Greg, a Cyclops / Donut-Store Clerk.
- Kelly Hu as News Reporter
- Tom Kenny as Wolfgang Amadeus Mozart
- Jason Hightower as Narrator

== Production ==
The film was first announced on September 3, 2019, as a new animated feature in production at Cinesite Animation directed by David Silverman with Raymond S. Persi as co-director. The announcement revealed Adam DeVine, Rachel Bloom, Zazie Beetz and Ken Jeong as cast members.

== Release ==
The film was released in Russia theatrically on February 11, 2021. The film was also released in the United Kingdom on August 20, 2021 by Sky Cinema. The film was released worldwide on Netflix on November 19, 2021. Extinct was in the Top 10 most watched English films on Netflix during the first week of its release.

=== Critical reception ===
Review aggregator Rotten Tomatoes reported a score of 43% based on seven reviews, with an average rating of 4.90/10. Steve Rose for The Guardian gave the film 2 out of 5 stars, writing that: "In the Darwinian world of kids' entertainment, Extinct looks like an evolutionary dead end."
