= Mila (2021 film) =

CG animated short film by Cinzia Angelini

- Directed by: Cinzia Angelini
- Written by: Cinzia Angelini
- Produced by: Andrea Emmes
- Music by: Flavio Gargano
- Production companies: Peppermax films; Pixel Cartoon; IbiscusMedia; Cinesite; Aniventure
- Release date: 2021
- Running time: 19:58 minutes
- Countries: United States; Italy; Canada; United Kingdom

Mila is a 2021 CG animated short film written and directed by Cinzia Angelini and produced by Andrea Emmes. It follows the story of a little girl whose life takes an unexpected turn during World War II. The film is a volunteer-based project that features the largest independent virtual animation studio ever created consisting of 350 animation professionals from 35 countries. After the announcement of the new partnership with Cinesite Studios, the film was released in 2021. As of May 2022, the short film has won more than 40 awards and has collected more than 50 nominations to festivals world-wide besides qualifying to the Oscar 2022 in the category Best Animated Short Film.

== Plot ==
Mila is a little girl who loses her family during the war. Thanks to a young woman who comes to her rescue, Mila survives a devastating bombardment. Her only possessions are a worn-out hat and a tattered carousel ticket. Mila and the woman manage to get through the war-torn night. Confronted with their losses and drawn together through their ordeal, they find salvation in each other and leave to build a new life together.

== Background ==
Director Cinzia Angelini stated that her motivation to create Mila laid in the commitment to spread awareness over child war victims and take action to prevent it from happening to more children. ″Mila is set in my mother's hometown, Trento, Italy, and is the story of a girl and two women, caught in the bombing of Trento in 1943. I want to show the impact that conflict has on the innocent civilians, and especially, on their children. Most of all, I seek to celebrate their strength, resilience, and the hope that they cling to as they fight for their very survival. This girl, now a woman, who inspired me to create this movie, was a child of WWII. She is also my mother.″ ″The Mila Family wants to prove that ‘cartoons’ can successfully enlighten all age groups on serious, real world issues.″

== Production ==
Early development work on the Mila film started in 2010 while the official production kicked off in 2011. In 2012 the team behind Mila consisted of 140 volunteers from over 20 countries. The first production studio to come onboard with the project was Pixel Cartoon which helped secure the financial support of the Trento Film Commission and Fondazione Cassa Rurale in Trento, Italy. Afterwards the studio IbiscusMedia joined the team and contributed in promotion and media coverage.

Over the years, the project gathered sponsors and partners including Autodesk, Toon Boom Animation, SideFX, and Dog Head Animation which was responsible for the 2D end credits.

Throughout the production of Mila, 350 artists from 35 countries volunteered for the project. The Mila team comprised four core groups – U.S.A, Italy, Mexico, and United Kingdom. Professional artists in Italy, Australia, India, France, Belgium, Russia, Indonesia, Malaysia, South Africa, Australia, Argentina, Brazil, Spain and more contributed in a variety of ways voluntarily.

In September 2019 Cinesite announced their partnership with the project to complete the production of Mila. The film was projected to be released in 2020. After a decade in the making, the film had its international premiere at the 16th edition of Animayo Festival in 2021. Mila was among the short films that qualified to the Academy Award for Best Animated Short Film in 2022.

== Music ==
The original score of the film is composed by Flavio Gargano for which he earned the nomination to the Annie Awards in 2022. The score was recorded live by the Haydn Orchestra of Bolzano and Trento, Italy.
