= Stitch Head =

2025 German-British-Luxembourgish animated film

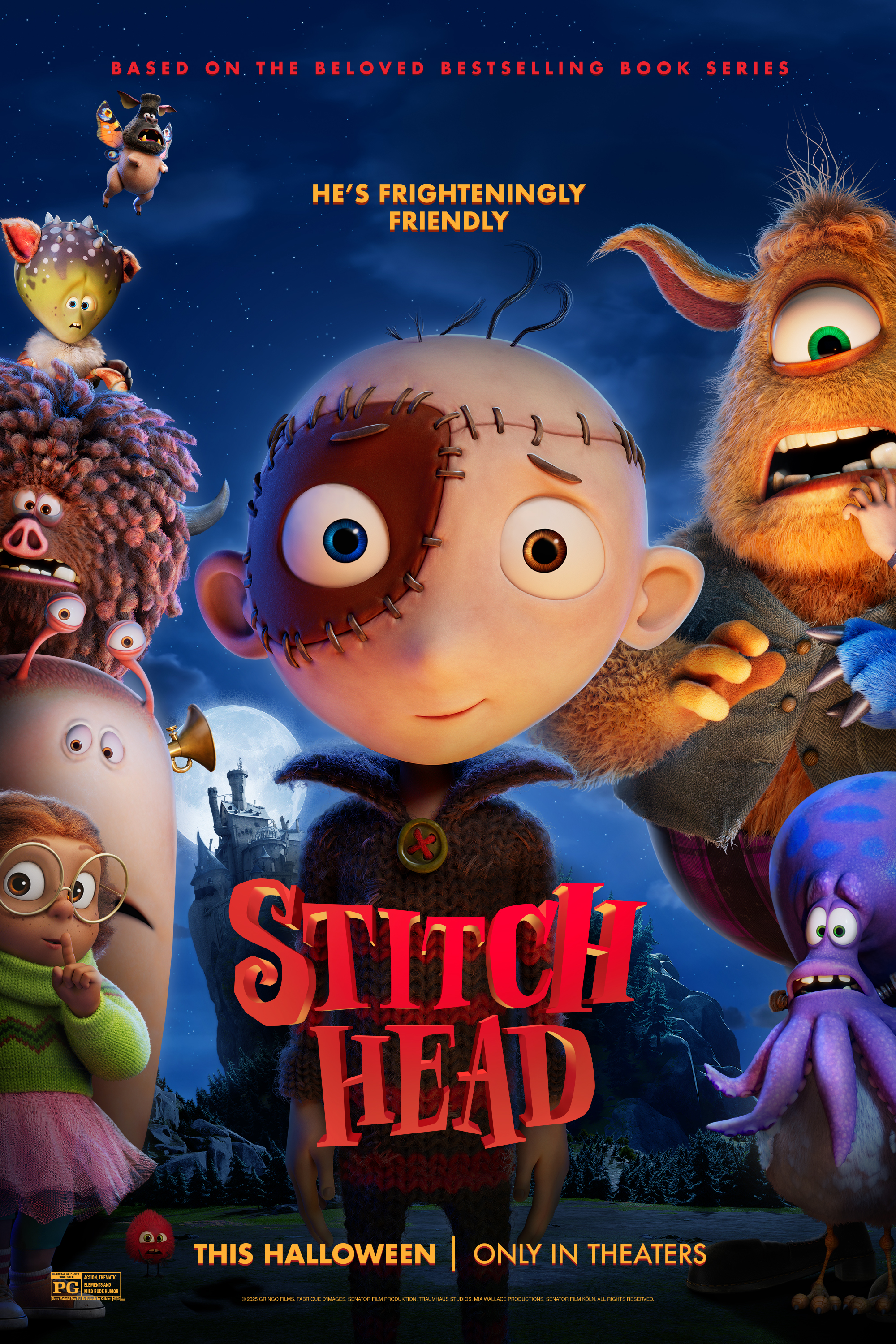
- US theatrical release poster
- Directed by: Steve Hudson
- Written by: Steve Hudson
- Based on: Stitch Head by Guy Bass
- Produced by: Sonja Ewers; Mark Mertens
- Starring: Asa Butterfield; Joel Fry; Rob Brydon; Tia Bannon
- Edited by: Dieter Riepenhausen
- Music by: Nick Urata
- Production companies: Aniventure; Gringo Films; Traumhaus Studios; The Picture Factory; Fabrique d’Images; Senator Film; Studio Rakete; Assemblage Entertainment
- Distributed by: Wild Bunch (Germany); Briarcliff Entertainment (United States); Kazoo Films (United Kingdom)
- Release dates: 10 June 2025 (Annecy); 16 October 2025 (Germany); 29 October 2025 (United States); 13 February 2026 (United Kingdom)
- Running time: 91 minutes
- Countries: Germany; Luxembourg; United Kingdom; India; France
- Languages: German; English
- Budget: $30 million
- Box office: $8 million

Stitch Head (German: Alles Voller Monster) is a 2025 animated monster fantasy comedy film directed and written by Steve Hudson, based on the 2011 graphic novel of the same name by the British author Guy Bass. The film is an international co-production between Germany, Luxembourg, India, France, and United Kingdom. It follows the gentle scrap monster Stitch Head, a creation by the monster-creating mad scientist from the castle of Grotteskew, who serves as a guide for his master's new creations and leaves the castle for a circus. The film premiered at the Annecy International Animation Film Festival on 10 June 2025 and was released theatrically in Germany on October 16, 2025. The film received mixed-to-positive reviews from critics and has grossed $8 million worldwide.

== Plot ==
In Castle Grotteskew, located at the top of a hill overlooking the village of Grubber Nubbin, Stitch Head is the first creation of a mad scientist who is obsessed with creating monsters. As the scientist creates new monsters, he ignores the existence of the older ones. Stitch Head looks after all the monsters and teaches them to become civilised, never leave the castle, and not draw attention to themselves out of fear of an angry mob.

A travelling circus Ringmaster, Fulbert Freakfinder, who is looking for his next big, new attraction, becomes enamoured with Stitch Head and attempts to get him to leave the castle for potential fame. Stitch Head initially declines the offer and tells Freakfinder off, but upon being reminded the Professor doesn't take note of him, he takes up Freakfinder's offer, much to the dismay of the other monsters.

Stitch Head proves to be a success with audiences as his outlandish, freakish appearance turns a big profit for Freakfinder's circus. Creature, one of the professor's recent creations, escapes from the castle and tries to bring Stitch Head back, but Stitch Head refuses because he feels loved at The Circus.

After a performance gone wrong, which results in his arm nearly being torn off, Stitch Head returns to The Castle with Creature. Meanwhile, Freakfinder, discovering that there are more monsters at The Castle and even more money to be made, tricks the village of Grubber Nubbin into forming an angry mob and attacking the castle. Together, Stitch Head and the monsters fend themselves from the villagers. During the ensuing riot, Freakfinder attempts to make off with the Professor, but is stopped by Stitch Head, who sacrifices his arm to prevent him from getting away. With Stitch Head injured, the Professor finally takes notice of Stitch Head and his previous creations for the first time.

With Fulbert Freakfinder apprehended, The Professor starts paying more attention to his creations, and the monsters make peace with the townsfolk as they are accepted into their village as one of their own.

== Cast ==
- Asa Butterfield as Stitch Head, the Professor's first ever creation who serves as his assistant and guide for the monsters.
- Joel Fry as Creature, a kindhearted cycloptic three armed monster who is the Professor's newest creation and best friends with Stitch Head
- Tia Bannon as Arabella, a smart girl who befriended Stitch Head.
- Rob Brydon as Professor, a mad professor who is obsessed with making monsters and the creator of the monsters.
- Seth Usdenov as Fulbert Freakfinder, a circus ringmaster.
- Alison Steadman as Nan
- Fern Brady as Madame Miranda, circus strongwoman
- Jamali Maddix
- Sway Clarke as Tiny
- Paul Tylack as Owggagoffakkookk

== Production ==
As of 2019, it was announced that the film was in production at Gringo Films in Cologne, directed by Toby Genkel, with the former director being Reza Memari. The film received € 30 million through production supports. In July 2023, Aniventure came to help finance the film. Development and pre-production was done at the Fabrique d’Images in Differdange, both the Stuttgart-based studios Lava Labs and Pixomondo, with the animation being provided by the Indian studio Assemblage Entertainment in Mumbai, while compositing, lighting, and rendering was provided by Studio Rakete in Hamburg.

== Release ==
In February 2023, GFM Animation acquired the international sales for the film at the European Film Market. In June 2025, GFM sold the film to Wild Bunch for France and Germany, Vertice Cine for Italy and Spain, IDC for Latin America, FilmFinity for South Africa, NOS Audiovisuais for Portugal, Vertical Entertainment for Eastern Europe, Central Partnership for the CIS, ACME for the Baltics, Myndform for Iceland, Aviro for China, Filmbridge for Mongolia, Skyline for Vietnam, Filmhouse for Israel, ECS for the Middle East, and Ricochet for airlines. Stitch Head had its world premiere at the Annecy International Animation Film Festival on 10 June 2025. In late July 2025, Briarcliff Entertainment acquired the North American distribution rights to the film, and released it on 29 October. The film was released in Germany on 16 October 2025. The film was released in the United Kingdom and Ireland on 13 February 2026, by Kazoo Films.

The film's North American distributor, Briarcliff Entertainment, collaborated with Jack in the Box to produce marketing tie-ins for Stitch Head.

== Reception ==
=== Critical response ===
On the review aggregator website Rotten Tomatoes, 69% of 35 critics' reviews are positive, with an average rating of 6.2/10. The website's consensus reads: "A daffy monster mash with a sweet lesson for children at its core, Stitch Head feels quilted from more inspired animated touchstones but retains a scrappy charm of its own." Metacritic, which uses a weighted average, assigned the film a score of 60 out of 100, based on 7 critics, indicating "mixed or average" reviews.

Wendy Ide of Screen Daily noted its "offbeat humour and enjoyably quirky character design" in her review. Jeremy K. Gover of the Untitled Film Project Podcast called it "this generation's Halloween classic." Writing for Cineuropa, Davide Abbatescianni admits the film "doesn’t reinvent the wheel," but "the comedy—mixing slapstick, light irony and a dash of cringe—lands effectively."
