= Paws of Fury: The Legend of Hank =

2022 animated film

- Theatrical release poster
- Directed by: Rob Minkoff; Mark Koetsier; Chris Bailey (Note: Chris Bailey was the lead director for the film alongside Mark Koetsier from 2014 to 2017. He had left the project when production restarted in 2019.)
- Screenplay by: Ed Stone; Nate Hopper; Mel Brooks; Norman Steinberg; Andrew Bergman; Richard Pryor; Alan Uger
- Story by: Andrew Bergman
- Based on: Blazing Saddles (Note: Despite serving as a loose remake of the film, the respective writing credits of Blazing Saddles are simply added in next to screenwriters Stone and Hooper, as opposed to an official "based on" credit.)
- Produced by: Rob Minkoff; Adam Nagle; Peter Nagle; Guy Collins; Yair Landau (Note: Yair Landau and Susan Purcell were producers of the film under Mass Animation, the original producing studio, prior to being replaced by Aniventure.); Susan Purcell
- Starring: Michael Cera; Ricky Gervais; George Takei; Gabriel Iglesias; Michelle Yeoh; Samuel L. Jackson
- Cinematography: Olaf Skjenna (layout)
- Edited by: Michael Andrews
- Music by: Bear McCreary
- Production companies: Flying Tigers Entertainment; Align; Aniventure; GFM Animation; HB Wink Animation; Cinesite
- Distributed by: Huayi Brothers (China); Sky Cinema (United Kingdom); Paramount Pictures (under Nickelodeon Movies; United States and Canada)
- Release dates: July 10, 2022 (Los Angeles); July 15, 2022 (United States); July 22, 2022 (United Kingdom)
- Running time: 98 minutes
- Countries: China; United Kingdom; United States
- Language: English
- Budget: $45 million
- Box office: $42.5 million

Paws of Fury: The Legend of Hank is a 2022 animated martial arts comedy film directed by Rob Minkoff, Mark Koetsier and Chris Bailey. A loose remake of the 1974 live-action film Blazing Saddles, it stars the voices of Michael Cera, Ricky Gervais, George Takei, Gabriel Iglesias, Michelle Yeoh and Samuel L. Jackson, with Mel Brooks, Aasif Mandvi, Djimon Hounsou, and Kylie Kuioka in supporting roles. Taking place in a world of anthropomorphic animals, the film tells the story of Hank, a dog who learns to become a samurai to save a cat village from a conniving landlord.

The project was first announced by producer Yair Landau in 2010 as Blazing Samurai in response to the then-recent trend of westernizing Asian films. The development of the film continued between 2014 and 2016 with Mass Animation handling production and Open Road Films acquiring the United States distribution rights before dropped out in 2017, due to the closure of Open Road Films. It was later re-announced in November 2019 after Aniventure joined as the new producing studio with a planned 2021 release. Due to the COVID-19 pandemic, much of the final animation was done remotely from the crew's homes as were some of the voice recordings.

Paws of Fury: The Legend of Hank was scheduled to be released in 2017, but was delayed several times, mainly due to distributor changes and the COVID-19 pandemic. It eventually premiered in Los Angeles on July 10, 2022, and was released in the United States on July 15, by Paramount Pictures under the Nickelodeon Movies imprint, and in the United Kingdom on July 22, by Sky Cinema. The film received mixed reviews from critics and grossed $42 million worldwide.

== Plot ==
In a land inspired by feudal Japan and entirely inhabited by cats, Ika Chu, a conniving high-ranking official of the land's Shogun, desires to expand his giant palace. However, it resides right next to the impoverished village of Kakamucho. Hoping to get rid of it, Ika Chu plans to force Kakamucho's residents to abandon their town by sending a gang of thugs led by his second-in-hand Ohga to trash the town. The townspeople demand that the Shogun appoint a new samurai to protect them after the previous one flees. Ika Chu, hoping to offend the townspeople, decides to appoint Hank, a dog prisoner about to be executed, as Kakamucho's samurai.

After an initial hostile reception, Hank relies on the assistance of Jimbo, a catnip-addled samurai who reluctantly agrees to train him, in order to overcome the townspeople's hostility. While training, Hank subdues Sumo, an immensely strong henchman that Ika Chu sent to drive out the townspeople quicker, with the help of Jimbo. The townspeople start to see Hank as a hero, but his newfound popularity ends up going to Hank's head and he neglects his training, which causes a fallout between him and Jimbo.

Ika Chu takes Hank to a private nightclub in order to distract him while secretly bribing people to respect Hank. At the same time, Ohga leads the bandits to trash Kakamucho. Hank returns to a devastated town. After a heated argument with Jimbo, he decides to go home. Halfway to the harbor, Hank finds an origami figure of himself in his belongings which reminds him of his samurai oath.

Jimbo attempts to storm Ika Chu's palace in hopes to free Sumo, who was captured by Ika Chu's henchmen. Hank returns in order to help him out. Upon hearing about Sumo's escape, Ika Chu recruits an army of thugs to get rid of Kakamucho for good. Hank returns to Kakamucho, and explains his plan to defeat Ika Chu's army.

The townspeople then build a perfect paper copy of the town and themselves as a diversion. When the raiders attack the fake town and its population of dummies, which have been booby-trapped with dynamite, Hank ignites the bombs and the townspeople attack the thugs. The Shogun arrives who questions the ruckus. Ohga accidentally exposes Ika Chu's plan to him, causing Ika Chu to flee. Hank then chases Ika Chu to his palace where he fights him on his giant jade toilet which overflows and threatens to flood the town. Hank warns the Kakamucho townspeople of the incoming flood and leads them in the digging of a channel to safely divert the water around the town.

With Kakamucho saved, the impressed Shogun decides to appoint Jimbo as the new samurai, but he gives the position to Hank. Hank feels that he is not entirely ready, so he ends up giving the position to Emiko, a kitten who also desires to be a samurai. Hank and Jimbo continue to train in their own time with their relationship mended.

In a post-credits scene, two guards look into the prison cell of Ika Chu who states that at least he will not have to partake in a sequel.

== Voice cast ==
- Michael Cera as Hank, a bumbling beagle who aspires to be a samurai. He is based on Cleavon Little's character Sheriff Bart from Blazing Saddles.
- Ricky Gervais as Ika Chu, a conniving Somali cat landlord who wants to get rid of Kakamucho to perfect his palace. He is based on Harvey Korman's character Hedley LaMarr from Blazing Saddles.
- Mel Brooks as Shogun Toshi, an empathetic British Shorthair who is the shōgun of Kakamucho. He is based on Brooks' character Governor William J. Le Petomane from Blazing Saddles.
- George Takei as Ohga, a muscular Manx cat who is the leader of Ika Chu's army. He is based on Slim Pickens' character Taggart from Blazing Saddles.
- Aasif Mandvi as Ichiro, a slim tuxedo cat who usually hangs around with Chuck
- Gabriel Iglesias as Chuck, a calico cat who usually hangs around with Ichiro
- Djimon Hounsou as Sumo, a giant philosophical tabby cat. He is based on Alex Karras' character Mongo from Blazing Saddles.
- Michelle Yeoh as Yuki, a Persian cat who is Emiko's overprotective mother
- Samuel L. Jackson as Jimbo, Hank's reluctant Russian Blue sensei who trains him to become a samurai. He is based on Gene Wilder's character Jim the Waco Kid from Blazing Saddles.
- Kylie Kuioka as Emiko, a feisty young Persian cat who also wants to become a samurai
- Cathy Shim as Little Mama, the grand dame of Kakamucho

== Production ==
=== Development ===
Paws of Fury: The Legend of Hank, then known as Blazing Samurai, was originally announced by Sony Pictures Animation co-founder and ex-chief and Mass Animation founder Yair Landau around 2010, inspired by the then-recent trend of westernizing Asian films. Originally intended to revolve around a black samurai protecting an East Asian village, the story was changed to center around cats and dogs in an effort to make the story more universal. Chris Rock at one point was considered to co-produce the film. The film was announced in November 2014, with GFM Films handling international sales and Rob Minkoff set to produce. The film was scripted by Ed Stone and Nate Hopper, but the final credits include the writers of Blazing Saddles. In February 2015, Open Road Films acquired the U.S. distribution rights with Chris Bailey and Mark Koetsier attached to direct. Susan Purcell also joined the production as a producer.

In November 2019, the film was re-announced after Aniventure joined the production. The budget was $45 million ($16 million was categorized as "original equity" while the rest of the $29 million came from Aniventure and Canadian tax credits). In August 2020, Adrian Politowski’s Align announced it would help executive produce and finance the film. In February 2021, a first-look revealed Landau and Purcell had been replaced by Adam Nagle and Guy Collins as producers. Chris Bailey also left the project as director at this point, to be the showrunner on Scooby-Doo and Guess Who?, and Rob Minkoff was promoted to director alongside Mark Koetsier. Despite this, Bailey still contractually receives credit for directing the film, as do Yair Landau and Susan Purcell for producing. Robert Ben Garant provided uncredited screenplay revisions during this time period. In April 2022, it was announced that the film had its title changed.

=== Animation ===
Arc Productions was set to provide most of the film's animation, until the company's rebranded to Jam Filled Toronto in 2016. In November 2019, it was revealed that Cinesite would take over animation duties, with its Montreal facilities handling most of the production, with additional assistance from its Vancouver facilities. Much of the film was animated remotely due to the COVID-19 pandemic, as were some of the voice recordings.

=== Music ===
In June 2021, Bear McCreary was announced to compose the musical score. The film also features two original songs by Broadway songwriters Alan Zachary & Michael Weiner: the opening titles track "Blazing Samurai" (performed by Michael K. Lee) and the end titles song "The Coolest Cat" (performed by Tony Award winner Adrienne Warren).

== Release ==
Paws of Fury: The Legend of Hank was theatrically released on July 15, 2022, by Paramount Pictures in North America. Its original release date was April 14, 2017 by Open Road Films, but was pushed to August 4, 2017. In November 2019, reports said the film was still at the "first animatic stage" at Cinesite, with a planned 2021 release. In January 2022, Paramount acquired the distribution rights from GFM Animation for $10 million for a release date of July 22, 2022, taking the release of Paramount Animation's Under the Boardwalk. In April, the release date was moved forward by a week to its July 15 date. It was expected to be released under the Paramount Animation brand, but was later revealed to be released under Nickelodeon Movies. The film was accompanied by a Big Nate short film titled Bad Hamster. It was also released on Sky as a Sky Cinema original on July 22, 2022, in the United Kingdom.

=== Home media ===
Paws of Fury: The Legend of Hank was released on digital download by Paramount Home Entertainment on August 16, 2022, in the United States. It was released on DVD and Blu-ray on October 18, 2022.

== Reception ==
=== Box office ===
In the United States of America and Canada, Paws of Fury: The Legend of Hank was released alongside Where the Crawdads Sing and Mrs. Harris Goes to Paris, and was projected to gross around $10 million from 3,475 theaters in its opening weekend. The film made $2.4 million on its first day, including $550,000 from Thursday night previews. It went on to debut to $6.3 million, finishing sixth at the box office. The film made $3.9 million in its second weekend (a drop of 38.7%), finishing seventh. It is to date, the highest-grossing film released by Aniventure.

=== Critical response ===
On the review aggregator website Rotten Tomatoes, 56% of 59 critics' reviews are positive, with an average rating of 5.3/10. The website's consensus reads: "While it might be intriguing for Mel Brooks completists, Paws of Fury: The Legend of Hank is an often ungainly blend of kid-friendly animation and grown-up gags." Metacritic, which uses a weighted average, assigned the film a score of 45 out of 100, based on 13 critics, indicating "mixed or average" reviews. Audiences polled by CinemaScore gave the film an average grade of "A−" on an A+ to F scale, and PostTrak reported 66% of audience members gave it a positive score, with 49% saying they would definitely recommend it.

Writing for TheWrap, Katie Walsh called the film a "breezy, funny, highly self-referential flick steeped in movie history". In a 2.5 out of 4 review, Mark Feeney of The Boston Globe wrote: "Sure, a lot of the jokes are dumb ... but Paws is quite smart. Clearly, all concerned considered it a pet project. They were right to do so." Owen Gleiberman praised Jackson and Gervais, but thought Cera's "sheepish" performance left the film "in search of a center", adding: "You get the feeling that the whole premise of this project was that the script, with its Blazing Saddles mystique, would somehow power it. But sorry, those fumes faded out across the decades." The A.V. Club's Martin Tsai gave a highly critical review, calling it "morally reprehensible", with a "lazy, melting-pot approach to exploring Asian culture".

== Video game ==
A video game adaptation of the film had been in the planning stages since 2019. In 2025, three years after the film's release, Maximum Entertainment would announce Samurai Academy: Paws of Fury, for digital release on November 20, 2025, for Steam, Xbox Series X/S, PlayStation 5 and Nintendo Switch (with physical versions additionally for the latter two consoles). The game, developed by ZEROLife Games and Fishing Cactus, is an action-adventure game which also serves as a sequel to the film.
