= Riverdance: The Animated Adventure =

2021 animated adventure film directed by Dave Rosenbaum & Eamonn Butler

- Film poster
- Directed by: Dave Rosenbaum; Eamonn Butler
- Written by: Dave Rosenbaum; Tyler Werrin
- Based on: Riverdance
- Produced by: Moya Doherty; Joel MacDonald; Adam Nagle; Peter Nagle
- Starring: Pierce Brosnan; Aisling Bea; Brendan Gleeson; Pauline McLynn; John Kavanagh; Lilly Singh
- Cinematography: Olaf Skjenna (layout); Adel Abada (lighting)
- Edited by: Kevin Pavlovic
- Music by: Bill Whelan
- Production companies: Cinesite; River Productions; Aniventure
- Distributed by: Sky Cinema (United Kingdom and Ireland); Netflix (United States)
- Release dates: 28 May 2021 (United Kingdom and Ireland); 14 January 2022 (United States)
- Running time: 86 minutes
- Countries: Ireland; United Kingdom
- Language: English

Riverdance: The Animated Adventure is a 2021 animated dance adventure film inspired by the dance show Riverdance. The film was made by Cinesite for River Productions and Aniventure.

Riverdance: The Animated Adventure was released in the United Kingdom on 28 May 2021, by Sky Cinema, and was made available to stream on Netflix on 14 January 2022 in the United States.

== Plot ==
In an Irish seaside village, a boy named Keegan spends much of his days in a lighthouse run by his grandfather, who tells him stories of the Huntsman that's after the light, and the Megaloceros Giganteus who protect it. They bond over Riverdance, a special dance to celebrate the life. One day, Keegan’s grandfather passes away, leaving him despondent to run the lighthouse as he is chosen to be the DJ at the St. Patrick’s Day party by Margot, the local music store owner.

Keegan goes outside the village, where he stumbles upon his friend, a Spanish girl named Moya. She makes him go down river, where it's revealed that she can dance on water. Moya introduces Keegan to her two Megaloceros Giganteus friends Penny and Benny, who lead the two to their herd. They enter a hurling match, and Keegan befriends the king, Patrick. Keegan comes upon Newgrange, where he encounters the Huntsman, who tries to take him under his wing, which Keegan refuses. The group travels to the sea, where Keegan sees a vision of his grandfather; Moya previously reveals that she saw her grandmother in this world, and by closing their eyes, people’s ancestors will appear. The Huntsman catches up with them, and tries shooting the herd alongside Keegan. Huntsman offers Patrick’s life and antlers in exchange for Keegan. Patrick agrees, and after the Huntsman shoots him, the river stops flowing. Keegan and the deer perform a dance in Patrick's memory, getting rid of the Huntsman and saving the river.

Keegan reunites with Moya and Benny becomes the new king of the Megaloceros Giganteus. Keegan and Moya return home, where Keegan, now content with his life, turns back on the lighthouse. He commits to the St. Patrick’s Day party, where everyone celebrates life while the Megaloceros Giganteus live in harmony again.

== Cast ==
- Pierce Brosnan as Patrick the Deer and Grandad
- Sam Hardy as Keegan
- Hannah Herman Cortes as Moya
- Lilly Singh as Penny
- Jermaine Fowler as Benny
- Pauline McLynn as Grandma
- John Kavanagh as the Gatekeeper
- Aisling Bea as Margot
- Brendan Gleeson as the Huntsman

== Production and release ==
In 2016, it was announced that Cinesite Studios was aiming to produce nine animated movies across a five year period, one of which included a film about Riverdance. Cinesite then announced in 2018 that it had secured funding to begin working on a number of films, including Riverdance.

Production of the film began in February 2020, with an estimated budget of €35 million.

After the film received funding, Pierce Brosnan, Aisling Bea, Brendan Gleeson, Pauline McLynn, John Kavanagh and Lilly Singh were announced as joining the cast. It has Dave Rosenbaum and Eamonn Butler as directors, with Brosnan to voice both 'Patrick' and 'Grandad'. According to Deadline Hollywood, Gleeson and Kavanagh are to voice the villains in the film, though Kavanagh was ultimately cast as a benign character.

The film features music by Irish composer, Bill Whelan. Whelan also served as composer for the original tour of Riverdance in the mid-1990s.

== Critical reception ==
Kevin Courtney of The Irish Times said the actors spoke with good Irish accents. But he worried that the movie only shows Irish people living in perfect villages and dancing all the time. He said the movie is sometimes like a Fáilte Ireland tourism advertisement.

Dierdre Molumby of Entertainment said this movie is "exhaustingly bad".
