= Gnome Alone =

- Theatrical release poster
- Directed by: Peter Lepeniotis
- Screenplay by: Michael Schwartz; Zina Zaflow
- Story by: Robert Moreland
- Produced by: John H. Williams; Danielle Sterling
- Starring: Becky G; Josh Peck; Tara Strong; Olivia Holt; David Koechner; Jeff Dunham; Patrick Stump; Nash Grier; Madison De La Garza; George Lopez
- Edited by: Rob Neal
- Music by: Patrick Stump
- Production companies: Vanguard Animation; SC Films International; 3QU Media; Vanguard Animation; Comic Animations
- Distributed by: Netflix
- Release dates: November 2, 2017 (Greece and Cyprus)
- Running time: 85 minutes
- Countries: United States; Canada; China
- Language: English
- Box office: $10.8 million

Gnome Alone is a 2017 animated fantasy comedy film directed by Peter Lepeniotis and written by Michael Schwartz and Zina Zaflow, from a story by Robert Moreland. Produced by Vanguard Animation and 3QU Media, the film stars the voices of Becky G, Josh Peck, Olivia Holt, George Lopez, Patrick Stump, David Koechner, and Tara Strong. It follows a young girl who moves to Tenderville, suddenly pairing up with a group of gnomes and her awkward neighbor in an attempt to defeat a pack of rabid and hungry beasts called Troggs.

The film was released on November 2, 2017 in Greece and Cyprus and was later released on Netflix on October 19, 2018 in the United States. The film received mixed reviews.

== Plot ==
Chloe and her mother, Catherine, move to Tenderville, in a massive house surrounded by mysterious gnomes. One night during dinner, Chloe discovers a secret room holding a mystical green gem, which she takes and turns into a necklace. Unbeknownst to her, she opens a portal from another realm in her basement, unleashing a pack of rabid and hungry creatures named "Troggs". At her new school, Chloe befriends popular girl Brittany and her friends, Tiffany and Chelsea, collectively known as the BTCs. Chloe catches Brittany's attention with the necklace and gives it to Brittany in hopes of entering her clique. At home, Chloe encounters a Trogg and attempts to kill it, before it mysteriously blows up.

The next day, Catherine tells Chloe she will be taking an extra shift at work. Upon leaving, the house gnomes reveal to Chloe that they're alive and tie up her when they discover she took the Keystone; the mysterious green gem Chloe ended up giving Brittany. The gnomes reveal that the Keystone keeps the Troggs from causing havoc within their realm. Quicksilver, one of the gnomes, reveals that the Troggs became their mortal enemies after they devoured the botanical lifeforms which made up their way of life. Zook, the gnome's current leader, also explains that Zamfeer, their former leader, once journeyed into the Trogg world to destroy it but never returned. Using the Keystone, they were able to stop the Troggs' portals from opening. They enlist Chloe to fend off the Troggs until she can retrieve the Keystone back. Chloe also inducts her awkward neighbor and classmate Liam to help her out.

Chloe, meanwhile, plans to obtain the necklace from Brittany at a school dance but gets caught up trying to impress the BTCs. Fearing her relationship with Liam is detrimental to her social status, Chloe rebukes him, causing him to leave. When Chloe finds out that Brittany didn't bring the necklace, she comes up with a plan to swing by her house. Liam meanwhile, heads home from the dance and accidentally falls inside a Trogg portal. Realizing Liam's truthfulness, Chloe breaks ties with the BTCs and heads home. After learning of Liam's whereabouts, Chloe regains her confidence and ventures after him through a portal in the toilet. She finds Liam, who gracefully accepts Chloe's apology, and encounters Zamfeer. They uncover a giant crystal and come up with a plan using Chloe's lithium-ion battery from her phone to blow up the crystal in order to destroy the Trogg world. They blow up the crystal; a larger version of the Keystone, and use the invading Troggs to escape in a portal, sucking all the Troggs back in their realm.

As the gnomes happily reunite with Zamfeer, Brittany arrives to further humiliate Chloe and Liam and destroy the remaining Keystone. While Brittany chastises Chloe, the Gnomes, Chloe, and Liam witness the formation of the Mega Trogg, which escapes from the basement. Blocked from escaping, everyone travels to the roof along with an ooze plant; something the Mega Trogg fears. Using the Keystone, Brittany's phone, and the ooze plant, Chloe creates a makeshift bomb, destroying the Mega Trogg and restoring their reality. Waking up alongside her mom, Chloe assures her mom that she wants to stay, while Brittany confirms that she has no memory of what happened the night before. Chloe discovers the gnomes also survived and she walks alongside Liam, friends once more, to school.

== Voice cast ==
- Becky G as Chloe, a young girl who discovers a group of gnomes living inside her home.
- Josh Peck as Liam, a nerdy boy.
- Tara Strong as Catherine, Chloe's mother.
- Olivia Holt as Brittany, the most popular girl at Chloe's new school.
- David Koechner as Zamfeer, a gnome friends with Chloe and Liam who was trapped in the Trogg world until they saved him.
- Jeff Dunham as Quicksilver, an elderly gnome.
- Patrick Stump as Alpha, Bravo and Charlie, three gnomes that befriend Chloe and Liam.
- Nash Grier as Trey, a boy at Chloe's new school.
- Madison De La Garza as Tiffany and Chelsea, the twin best friends of Brittany.
- George Lopez as Zook, the leader of the gnomes.
- Fred Tatasciore as the Troggs and Mega Trogg, the evil creatures that Chloe and the others confront.

== Production ==
Production on Gnome Alone began at Cinesite in Montreal. The voice cast includes Becky G, Josh Peck, Olivia Holt, George Lopez, and Patrick Stump, while John H. Williams produced the film through his company 3QU Media, which also financed the film. In 2017, a distribution company, Smith Global Media, had acquired distribution rights to the animated film.

== Release ==
The film was originally set for an October 13, 2017, release but was pushed back to March 2, 2018. The film was finally released on April 20, 2018, in Latin America, Europe, and Asia. It was later released on October 19 of the same year via Netflix in the United States.

== Reception ==
On review aggregator Rotten Tomatoes, Gnome Alone has a 45% score.

== Future ==
=== Sequel ===
In October 12, 2026, the film has a sequel titled Gnome Alone 2: Game of Gnomes. Peter Lepeniotis returns to set to direct the sequel.
