= Trouble (2019 film) =

- Theatrical release poster
- Directed by: Kevin Johnson
- Screenplay by: Rob Muir
- Story by: Jordan Katz; Rob Muir
- Produced by: John H. Williams; Danielle Sterling; Wilmer Valderrama
- Starring: Big Sean; Pamela Adlon; Lucy Hale; Joel McHale; Snoop Dogg; Betty White
- Edited by: Judith Allen; Rob Neal; Kevin Pavlovic
- Music by: Jessica Weiss
- Production companies: 3QU Media; Vanguard Animation; Comic Animations; WV Enterprises
- Distributed by: Netflix
- Release dates: 8 August 2019 (Thailand); 28 May 2021 (United States)
- Running time: 87 minutes
- Countries: United States; Canada
- Language: English
- Box office: $13.8 million

Trouble, also known as Dog Gone Trouble, is a 2019 animated comedy film directed by Kevin Johnson and written by Rob Muir, from a story by Muir and Jordan Katz. The film stars Sean "Big Sean" Anderson, Pamela Adlon, and Lucy Hale. It was the final film role of Betty White before her death in 2021 (not counting her appearance in the 2022 documentary Betty White: A Celebration, which was released posthumously).

It was also dedicated in memory of executive producer, Conrad Vernon's dog, Linus who died in 2017.

The film was released on May 28, 2021, by Netflix.

== Plot ==
Trouble is a pampered dog, living the good life in a mansion with his wealthy, elderly owner, Mrs. Sarah Vanderwhoozie, under the care of her loyal butler, James, and famed animal trainer Cesar Millan. One day, after his owner dies due to natural causes, he is left alone and unaware in her mansion. Claire and Norbert, Mrs. Vanderwhoozie's niece and nephew, arrive to claim their inheritance. While discarding her belongings and planning to sell other priceless items, they accidentally and unknowingly get rid of Trouble, whom they show instant dislike and apathy towards. Nevertheless, to rightfully inherit their aunt's fortune, Claire and Norbert must first be willing and able to bond and take care of Trouble within three days, until they can sign the contract entrusted by their aunt's lawyer, Mr. Macbain; much to their reluctance. Realizing that Trouble is missing, they hire Thurman Sanchez, an Ace Ventura-esque but expert animal tracker, to find him before the deadline.

Having made it out of the truck carrying away his owner's belongings, and after learning the truth about her death, Trouble accidentally messes up a group of red squirrels' nut storage in their tree. As payback, the squirrels steal his collar and run off, leaving Trouble lost, alone, and looking like a stray. In the city, Trouble meets a stray dog named Rousey while trying to get a meal from a meat truck, which results in a chase through a restaurant owned by famed chef Ludo Lefebvre; a wannabe-singer pizza delivery girl named Zoe Bell also loses one of her pizzas. After another encounter with the squirrels, while spending the night with Rousey outdoors, Trouble enters a dog park where he meets domestic dogs: Norm, Gizmo, Bella, and Tippy, who somewhat help him find a home by having him play in traffic, where he gets picked up by Zoe, and is taken to her apartment. Though only temporary until she can find where he belongs, and hoping to avoid her landlord finding out, Zoe and Trouble begin to bond. Zoe writes a song for a singing competition she plans to enter, and fashions a new collar for Trouble.

The next day, at the dog park, despite some rocky first impressions, Norm and the other dogs willingly help Trouble when they find out that the squirrels took his old collar while confronting him again. During the struggle, Thurman, having found Trouble at last, accidentally snatches the leader of the squirrels, with whom he offers to make a deal – a pile of nuts in exchange for their help in retrieving Trouble for him. After Zoe momentarily leaves Trouble at her apartment, the squirrels try to flush him out, causing a huge mess, which results in Zoe being evicted by her landlord upon returning. Trouble is sent to the dog pound, where he meets Rousey again and befriends three other strays: Snoop, Otis, and Caramel. Trouble learns from Rousey that, like him, she was once an indoor dog. However, one day, after saving her owners' child from a traffic collision, they mistook her heroic behavior for aggression and dumped her at the pound, which explains Rousey's distrust of humans.

On the day of the deadline, rather than enter the singing competition, Zoe decides to go to the pound and retrieve Trouble. However, Thurman has already beaten her to it. Zoe rides off, looking for Trouble all over the city. Realizing how much Zoe truly loves and cares about Trouble, Rousey decides to help the others escape and help Zoe find him. They use Trouble's discarded new collar to track him and with the help of the domestic dogs as well. Returning Trouble to Claire and Norbert at the mansion, Thurman secretly vows retaliation with the squirrels' help after the twins refuse to pay him as promised.

Having misled Mr. Macbain that they bonded with Trouble, Claire and Norbert are about to claim their inheritance when Zoe suddenly arrives, revealing what really happened. Demanding his money, Thurman enters and further reveals the situation to Mr. Macbain. Having learned the truth, Mr. Macbain denies the twins' inheritance. Still wanting his money, Thurman summons the squirrels to hold Trouble for ransom, until Snoop, Otis, and Caramel enter, having followed Rousey; a battle ensues. While Trouble is held against a fan by the squirrel leader, Rousey arrives just in time to save his life. She demands Trouble's old collar back before the squirrels exit. Trouble is then granted permission by Mr. Macbain to decide whom he wants his owner to be. Trouble joyfully chooses Zoe, which allows her to inherit Trouble, the mansion, the assets, and his owner's fortune after signing the contract; much to the twins' disgust. They and Thurman leave. Rousey is also adopted by James; much to her joy.

Zoe uses the money to revitalize the dog park, renamed the Vanderwhoozie Dog Park, and dedicated to both Mrs. Vanderwhoozie and Trouble. She also begins living her dream as a singer, attracting the attention of famed singer-songwriter Jason Mraz. Snoop – having probably been adopted by Zoe, along with Otis and Caramel – proceeds to sing in dedication to Trouble; much to the dogs' joy.

== Cast ==
- Sean "Big Sean" Anderson as Trouble, a pampered Alaskan Klee Kai/Terrier/Maltese mix living in a mansion. Previously owned by Mrs. Sarah Vanderwhoozie, he later becomes Zoe's dog.
- Pamela Adlon as Rousey, a gray American Pit Bull Terrier who befriends Trouble. Previously owned by a family, she later becomes James' dog after being abandoned at the pound.
- Lucy Hale as Zoe Bell, a pizza delivery girl, aspiring singer, and Trouble's new owner.
- Marissa Winokur as Claire, Norbert's twin sister and Mrs. Vanderwhoozie's greedy niece, who seeks to claim her aunt's fortune through Trouble.
- Wilmer Valderrama as Thurman Sanchez, an eccentric expert animal tracker known as "The Thurminator". He is hired by Claire and Norbert to find, track, and retrieve Trouble to claim their inheritance.
- Joel McHale as Norbert, Claire's dim-witted twin brother and Mrs. Vanderwhoozie's greedy nephew, who seeks to claim his aunt's fortune through Trouble.
- Seth Rollins as Norm, a grey bulldog wearing a SWAT shirt. Rollins also voiced a meat delivery guy.
- Damon Wayans Jr. as Gizmo, a delusional whippet.
- Olivia Holt as Bella, a nervous Pembroke Welsh Corgi who wears an Elizabethan collar.
- Carlos PenaVega as Tippy, a blue and white poodle.
- Harland Williams as Caramel, a Dachshund/Corgi mix with a surfer accent.
- Conrad Vernon as Otis, a Dalmatian with a gift for ventriloquism, who is Snoop's best friend.
- Dee Bradley Baker as Nutty Squirrel and the Squirrel Pack, a group of crazy and nut-obsessed red squirrels who bully and torment Trouble after a minor incident with their nuts. They later become Thurman's temporary henchmen, assisting him in capturing Trouble.
- Kevin Chamberlin as James, Mrs. Vanderwhoozie and Trouble's most loyal butler and Rousey's new owner.
- Jim Cummings as Mr. MacBain, Mrs. Vanderwhoozie's trustworthy lawyer and executor of her estate. Cummings also voiced Zoe's boss, who runs a pizza restaurant called Pauly's Pizza.
- Manny "Streetz" Guevara as the Landlord, a strict, apathetic building proprietor who dislikes pets and late payments.
- Ludo Lefebvre as himself
- Jason Mraz as himself
- Cesar Millan as himself
- Snoop Dogg as Snoop, a rapping Doberman version of Snoop Dogg who is Otis' best friend.
- Betty White as Mrs. Sarah Vanderwhoozie, Trouble's wealthy former owner and Claire and Norbert's late aunt.
- Cori Broadus as Snoopette, a female Doberman who is Snoop's daughter, seen at the dog park.
- Jessica Acevedo as a Staff Member

== Reception ==
Trouble received overwhelmingly negative reviews from critics and the box office. In the film's Canadian theatrical release, it grossed $13.8 million, making it one of the lowest-grossing animated movies of all time.

New York Times writer Chris Azzopardi wrote, "Home is at the center of Dog Gone Trouble, about a lost pooch whose owner has just died. But this Netflix animated family feature is nothing to write home about." Charles Solomon of FilmWeek said that the film "has all the individuality of a dixie cup and just as disposable." However, Jennifer Green of Common Sense Media had a more favorable response, writing, "Animated dog films can feel a dime a dozen, but this one might stand out thanks to its diverse cast, star cameos, and sly humor."

After Betty White's death, the nature of her role in what was ultimately her final film was discussed, particularly the lines "Hello everyone. I have some sad news. I bit the big one! I’ve cashed in my chips. I’m dead!", which are played for laughs, but, in light of her real-life death, "[add] an eerie tone to the otherwise innocuous family film."
