= Cinesite =

British visual effects studio

- Industry: Film
- Founded: 1991; 35 years ago
- Headquarters: Head office: 10 Little Portland Street, London, England, United Kingdom W1W 7JG; International offices: 500-250 St-Antoine West, Montreal, Quebec, Canada H2Y 0A3; 500-565 Great Northern Way, Vancouver, British Columbia, Canada V5T 0H8
- Number of locations: 3
- Key people: Antony Hunt (Group CEO)
- Services: Visual effects; Animation; Immersive
- Divisions: Cinesite VFX; Cinesite Animation; Cinesite Vancouver; Image Engine; Trixter; L'Atelier Animation; FX3X (majority stake); Squeeze Studio (majority stake); Assemblage Entertainment (majority stake); The Imaginarium Studios (majority stake); Aniventure (affiliate)
- Website: https://www.cinesite.com/

Cinesite (also known as The Cinesite Group) is a British visual effects studio. Its head office in London opened for business in 1994, initially offering services in visual effects for film and television, subsequently expanding to include animation and immersive services.

Divisions of Cinesite and its partner companies Image Engine, Trixter, L'Atelier Animation, The Imaginarium Studios, Squeeze and Assemblage Entertainment operate in London, Berlin, Munich, Skopje, Belgrade, Montreal, Quebec City, Vancouver, Atlanta and Mumbai with more than 2,500 employees.

== History ==
=== Foundation ===
Cinesite opened its doors in Los Angeles in 1991 to help with the digital restoration of Snow White and the Seven Dwarfs. The restoration was released in 1993, and Cinesite opened a division in London in 1994. There, it originally operated as a service bureau for Kodak's Cineon digital film system. Both locations subsequently evolved to become full service visual effects facilities. In 2003, Kodak merged the Cinesite Hollywood office into LaserPacific.

In May 2012, Kodak sold Cinesite to a UK-based private investor. Current ownership is a combination of its existing management team supported by private investment.

=== International growth ===
After Cinesite became independent from Kodak in 2012, it began a sustained period of international growth.

In January 2014, with the support of Investissement Québec, Cinesite announced its opening of 27,000 sq ft studios in Montréal and a feature animation division at that location. Its initial employment target was reached 18 months early, in August 2015.

In July 2015, Cinesite announced its acquisition of Vancouver-based visual effects facility Image Engine, which has won Emmy awards for its visual effects on The Book of Boba Fett and Game of Thrones and also received an Academy Award nomination for District 9 in 2010.

In March 2017, it acquired Vancouver-based animation studio Nitrogen Studios and in August 2018 the German VFX studio TRIXTER.

In June 2018, Cinesite was placed in the annual Sunday Times HSBC International Track 200 league table, which ranks the UK's highest performing private firms by international growth.

In 2022, the company announced a series of further acquisitions, beginning with Montreal-based L'Atelier Animation in July which had produced animated films and television series since 2012. Squeeze Studios followed in early August, Balkan-based visual effects studio FX3X later that month and in November, Assemblage Entertainment in Mumbai. In May 2023, Cinesite would purchase a majority stake in Andy Serkis' motion capture production studio The Imaginarium.

In 2024 Cinesite was featured in the first edition of Europe's Long-Term Growth Champions by Financial Times and Statista. The list comprised 300 companies in Europe with the highest disclosed compound annual growth rate over the 10 years to 2023 the company was ranked at number 62.

== Visual effects ==
The Cinesite group of visual effects companies includes its own brand services, along with partner companies Image Engine, TRIXTER and FX3X.

Notable feature film productions Cinesite has created visual effects for include Roald Dahl's Matilda The Musical (2022), Black Panther: Wakanda Forever (2022), No Time to Die (2021) and Avengers: Endgame (2019). Cinesite has completed work on all eight films in the Harry Potter franchise in addition to Fantastic Beasts and Where to Find Them and nine films in the James Bond franchise.

Cinesite's episodic work includes, Moon Knight, The Wheel of Time and Emmy nominated The Man Who Fell to Earth. It won a BAFTA craft award in 2022 for the second season of The Witcher as well as Emmy awards for Generation Kill (2008) and Rome (2006). Emmy nominations include American Gods: Season 1 and Band of Brothers (2002).

Cinesite won a Visual Effects Society award in 2021 for its work on Universal Studios' stage-based stunt show The Bourne Stuntacular. The show also won an award from the TEA (Themed Entertainment Association) which stated, "The high level of technical achievement and the creative application in creating a spectacular, immersive experience makes The Bourne Stuntacular a worthy recipient of this honor."

The studio won a BAFTA in Special, Visual and Graphic Effects for its work on The Witcher S2 at the 2022 British Academy Television Craft Awards.

== Feature animation ==
On 8 February 2016, Cinesite announced the launch of a dedicated feature animation division at its Montréal Studios. Since then, it has worked with production partners to complete Charming (2018), Gnome Alone (2018), Trouble (2019), and Fearless (2020) for 3QU Media, The Star (2017) for Sony Pictures Animation, and Extinct (2021) for Huayi Brothers.

In addition to providing production services for other studios, Cinesite produces its own animated features through Aniventure. Cinesite first collaborated with River Productions to produce Riverdance: The Animated Adventure (2021); an animated version of the Irish stage show of the same name, then took over production on the long-gestating feature Paws of Fury: The Legend of Hank (2022). They recently completed Teenage Mutant Ninja Turtles: Mutant Mayhem (2023) & Hitpig (2024); a loose adaptation of the Berkeley Breathed book Pete & Pickles. Next set to produce the long in-development adaptation of Animal Farm directed by Andy Serkis and Paramount's untitled Smurfs musical (2025).

Vancouver-based animation company Nitrogen Studios was rebranded under Cinesite soon after its acquisition by the group in March 2017. Since then, it has worked for MGM on The Addams Family (2019) and its sequel. In 2022, Cinesite acquired the Montreal-based L'Atelier Animation, and later in the year, purchased majority stakes in Squeeze Studio and Assemblage Entertainment.

== Virtual production ==
In May 2023, Cinesite agreed to invest in The Imaginarium Studios, a Performance Capture and Virtual Production company with facilities at Pinewood Studios in the UK and at Trilith Studios in Atlanta, Georgia, USA.

== Immersive ==
In January 2024, Cinesite announced it was opening an immersive division to create content that will span virtual, physical and mixed realities, location-based entertainment and theme park rides and attractions. The studio also confirmed it had entered a long-term partnership with Frameless Creative, the company behind the UK's largest and London's first permanent multi-sensory art experience.

The company also revealed it had animated Forsaken a short film conceived and directed by award-winning filmmaker Roland Lane and supported by Greenpeace and Arts Council England. Forsaken played on Outernet London's floor to ceiling wrap around screens to highlight the mass extinction of life on Earth.

The studio created stage-based stunt show The Bourne Stuntacular for Universal Studios Orlando. The project won Outstanding Visual Effects in a Special Venue Project at the Visual Effects Society awards.

== Visualisation ==
In February 2024, Cinesite announced it was opening a new division 'Cinesite VIS' to expand its previs, virtual production, techvis and postvis services. The newly created division is currently working on feature film projects as part of an integrated offering, but will also operate as a standalone visualisation vendor.

== Selected filmography ==
=== VFX ===
==== 1990s–2000s ====
Year	Title	Studio	Notes
1996	Space Jam	Warner Bros.	
1996	The Adventures of Pinocchio	New Line Cinema	
2001	Harry Potter and The Philosopher's Stone	Warner Bros.	
2002	Harry Potter and The Chamber of Secrets	Warner Bros.	
2004	Harry Potter and The Prisoner of Azkaban	Warner Bros.	
2004	King Arthur	Buena Vista Pictures (via Touchstone Pictures)	
2004	Troy	Warner Bros.	
2005	Charlie and The Chocolate Factory	Warner Bros. / Village Roadshow Pictures	
2005	Harry Potter and The Goblet of Fire	Warner Bros.	
2005	The Hitchhikers' Guide to The Galaxy	Buena Vista Pictures (via Touchstone Pictures)	
2005	V For Vendetta	Warner Bros.	
2007	The Golden Compass	New Line Cinema	
2007	Harry Potter and The Order of The Phoenix	Warner Bros.	
2007	Underdog	Buena Vista Pictures (via Walt Disney Pictures)	
2009	Harry Potter and The Half Blood Prince	Warner Bros.	
2009	Moon	Sony Pictures Classics / Stage 6 Films	

==== 2010s ====
Year	Title	Studio	Notes
2010	Clash of the Titans	Warner Bros. / Legendary Pictures	
2010	Harry Potter and the Deathly Hallows – Part 1	Warner Bros.	
2010	Prince of Persia: The Sands of Time	Walt Disney Studios Motion Pictures (via Walt Disney Pictures)	
2011	Battle: Los Angeles	Columbia Pictures	
2011	Harry Potter and the Deathly Hallows – Part 2	Warner Bros.	
2011	Pirates of the Caribbean: On Stranger Tides	Walt Disney Studios Motion Pictures (via Walt Disney Pictures)	
2012	John Carter	Walt Disney Studios Motion Pictures (via Walt Disney Pictures)	
2012	Skyfall	Metro-Goldwyn-Mayer / Columbia Pictures	
2013	Iron Man 3	Walt Disney Studios Motion Pictures (via Marvel Studios) / Paramount Pictures	
2013	World War Z	Paramount Pictures	
2014	300: Rise of an Empire	Warner Bros. / Legendary Pictures	
2014	Edge of Tomorrow	Warner Bros. / Village Roadshow Pictures	
2014	Hercules	Paramount Pictures / Metro-Goldwyn-Mayer	
2014	Into the Storm	Warner Bros. / New Line Cinema / Village Roadshow Pictures	
2015	The Last Witch Hunter	Summit Entertainment / Lionsgate	
2015	Maggie	Lionsgate / Roadside Attractions / Grindstone Entertainment	
2015	The Man From U.N.C.L.E.	Warner Bros.	
2015	The Revenant	20th Century Fox / Regency Enterprises	
2015	San Andreas	Warner Bros. / New Line Cinema / Village Roadshow Pictures	
2015	Spectre	Metro-Goldwyn-Mayer / Columbia Pictures	
2016	Assassin's Creed	20th Century Fox / Regency Enterprises	
2016	Fantastic Beasts and Where to Find Them	Warner Bros.	
2016	Independence Day: Resurgence	20th Century Fox	
2016	Now You See Me 2	Summit Entertainment / Lionsgate	
2018	Avengers: Infinity War	Walt Disney Studios Motion Pictures (via Marvel Studios)	
2018	The Commuter	StudioCanal / Lionsgate	
2018	Mary Poppins Returns	Walt Disney Studios Motion Pictures (via Walt Disney Pictures)	
2018	Mute	Netflix	
2018	Robin Hood	Summit Entertainment / Lionsgate	
2018	Zero	Pen Marudhar Entertainment / Yash Raj Films / Zee Studios / Eveready Pictures /	
2019	Avengers: Endgame	Walt Disney Studios Motion Pictures (via Marvel Studios)	

==== 2020s ====
Year	Title	Studio	Notes
2021	Black Widow	Walt Disney Studios Motion Pictures (via Marvel Studios)	
2021	Space Jam: A New Legacy	Warner Bros.	
2021	Respect	United Artists Releasing (via Metro-Goldwyn-Mayer)	
2021	No Time to Die	United Artists Releasing (via Metro-Goldwyn-Mayer)	
2021	Spider-Man: No Way Home	Columbia Pictures / Marvel Studios	
2022	Cyrano	United Artists Releasing (via Metro-Goldwyn-Mayer)	
2022	Thor: Love and Thunder	Walt Disney Studios Motion Pictures (via Marvel Studios)	
2022	RRR	HR Pictures	
2022	Black Panther: Wakanda Forever	Walt Disney Studios Motion Pictures (via Marvel Studios)	
2022	Ticket to Paradise	Universal Pictures	
2022	Matilda	Netflix / Sony Pictures Releasing International	
2023	Tetris	Apple TV+	
2023	Peter Pan & Wendy	Disney+	
2023	The Beanie Bubble	Apple TV+	
2023	Strays	Universal Pictures	
2023	A Haunting in Venice	Walt Disney Studios Motion Pictures (via 20th Century Studios)	
2023	Dashing Through the Snow	Disney+	
2023	The Family Plan	Apple TV+	
2023	Aquaman and the Lost Kingdom	Warner Bros.	
2024	Lift	Netflix	
2024	Road House	Amazon MGM Studios (via Amazon Prime Video)	
2024	The Fall Guy	Universal Pictures	
2024	Blitz	Apple TV+	
2024	The Union	Netflix	
2025	Warfare	A24 / DNA Films	
2025	G20	Amazon/ MGM Studios	
2025	The SpongeBob Movie: Search for SquarePants	Paramount Animation / Nickelodeon Movies	
2026	Michael	Lionsgate/Universal Pictures	
2026	Crime 101	Amazon/ MGM Studios	

=== Television ===
Year	Film title	Network	Notes
2001	Band of Brothers	HBO	Miniseries
2005–2007	Rome	HBO	
2008	Generation Kill	HBO	Miniseries
2017–2021	American Gods	Starz	
2018–2023	Jack Ryan	Amazon Prime Video	
2018–2021	Lost in Space	Netflix	
2019–present	The Witcher	Netflix	
2020–2022	Avenue 5	HBO	
2020–2022	Locke & Key	Netflix	
2020	Dark	Netflix	Season 3
2021–2022	Fate: The Winx Saga	Netflix	
2021	Tribes of Europa	Netflix	
2021	The North Water	AMC+	Miniseries
2021–present	The Wheel of Time	Amazon Prime Video	
2022–2024	Halo	Paramount+	
2022	Moon Knight	Disney+	Miniseries
2022–present	The Last Bus	Netflix	
2022	The Man Who Fell to Earth	Showtime	Miniseries
2023–present	Hijack	Apple TV+	
2024	True Detective: Night Country	HBO	
2024	Kaos	Netflix	
2024	Nautilus	Disney+	

== See also ==
- Digital Domain
- DNEG
- Framestore
- Industrial Light & Magic
- Moving Picture Company
- Rhythm and Hues Studios
- Sony Pictures Imageworks
- Blur Studio
- Weta Digital
- Image Engine
