= Aniventure =

British entertainment company

- Formerly: Comic Animations (2013-20)
- Founded: 2013
- Headquarters: London, United Kingdom

Aniventure is a British independent content creation and intellectual property company based in London, England and set up in 2013 to produce family-oriented feature animation.

Aniventure works with production partners to take feature film concepts from pitch development through to completion. It has a first-look service deal with visual effects and animation service studio Cinesite.

== History ==
Under its former name Comic Animations, the company's first release was the award-winning Beans in December 2013, co-produced with Cinesite, which amassed over 15 million views on YouTube. They then signed a deal with 3QU Media in 2014 to produce four films for Vanguard Animation, eventually releasing Charming, Gnome Alone, Trouble and Fearless.

In February 2016 Comic Animations began development on an animated feature adaptation of the stage production Riverdance, in association with River Productions and Cinesite; the movie Riverdance: The Animated Adventure was eventually released in 2021, by which time Comic Animations had changed its name to Aniventure.

In 2017, they entered into a partnership with the Harold Lloyd estate to adapt Harold Lloyd based animated content.

In 2019, Klaus, the traditionally animated Christmas adventure written and directed by Sergio Pablos, was released. Produced by his company SPA Studios in partnership with Atresmedia Cine and Aniventure, the film was distributed by Netflix. Klaus won seven awards at the 47th Annie Awards, including Best Animated Feature, and also Best Animated Film at the 73rd British Academy Film Awards. It was the first animated film from Netflix to be nominated for an Academy Award.

In November 2019, Aniventure's association with Blazing Samurai, to be later renamed Paws of Fury: The Legend of Hank, was announced (reported to be loosely inspired by the Mel Brooks film Blazing Saddles). A collaboration between Aniventure and GFM Animation, the news came on the first day of the American Film Market in 2019 that the project was fully-funded and moving into production at Cinesite.

In October 2020, Aniventure revealed the voice cast of its upcoming animated film Hitpig!, with Jason Sudeikis and Lilly Singh in the leading roles. The film is based on Berkeley Breathed's picture book Pete and Pickles.

== Filmography ==
=== Produced under Comic Animations ===
- Beans (2013)
- Gnome Alone (2017)
- Charming (2018)
- Trouble (2019)
- Klaus (2019)
- Fearless (2020)

=== Produced under Aniventure ===
- Riverdance: The Animated Adventure (2021)
- Mila (2021)
- Paws of Fury: The Legend of Hank (2022)
- Cracké Family Scramble (2022-present)
- Hitpig! (2024)
- Stitch Head (2025)
- Animal Farm (2026)
- Untitled Mad Hatter film (TBA)
