= List of computer-animated films =

A computer-animated film is an animated feature film that was created using computer software to appear three-dimensional. While traditional 2D animated films are now made primarily with the help of computers, the technique to render realistic 3D computer graphics (CG) or 3D computer-generated imagery (CGI), is unique to computer animation.

This is a list of theatrically released feature films that are entirely computer-animated.

== Released films ==
Release date listed is the first public theatrical screening of the completed film. This may mean that the dates listed here may not be representative of when the film came out in a particular country.

The country or countries listed reflects the places where the production companies for each title are based. This means that the countries listed for a film might not reflect the location where the film was produced or the countries where the film received a theatrical release. If a title is a multi-country production, the country listed first corresponds with the production company that had the most significant role in the film's creation.

Film	Released	Production company(s)	Country(s)
.hack//The Movie	January 21, 2012	CyberConnect2; Anima	Japan
10 Lives	April 5, 2024	GFM Animation; Align; Caramel Films; L'Atelier Animation	United Kingdom; Canada; France; United States
100% Wolf	May 29, 2020	Flying Bark Productions	Australia
108 Demon Kings; 108 rois-démons	December 4, 2014	Fundamental Films	France; Belgium; Luxembourg
200% Wolf	August 8, 2024	Flying Bark Productions; Atlantika Films; 200 Wolf Pelicula, A.I.E	Australia; Spain
25 April	September 14, 2015	K5 International; New Zealand Film Commission; Ingenious Media; Flux Animation Studio; GFC FilmsImages & Sound; Pitfan Productions	New Zealand
3 Bahadur	May 22, 2015	Waadi Animations; SOC Films; ARY	Pakistan
3 Bahadur: The Revenge of Baba Balaam	December 15, 2016	Waadi Animations	Pakistan
3 to the rescue	January 6, 2011	Raycast Animation Studio; Antena Latina Films	Dominican Republic
9	September 9, 2009	Relativity Media; LuxAnimation; Tim Burton Productions	United States
Abominable	September 27, 2019	DreamWorks Animation; Pearl Studio; Zhong Ming You Ying Film	United States; China
Action Man: X Missions – The Movie	2005	Reel FX Creative Studios; Hasbro	United States
The Addams Family	October 11, 2019	Metro-Goldwyn-Mayer Pictures; Bron Creative; Cinesite Studios; Cinesite Vancouver	Canada; United States
The Addams Family 2	October 1, 2021	Metro-Goldwyn-Mayer Pictures; Bron Creative; Cinesite Studios; Cinesite Vancouver (uncredited); The Jackal; Group Glickmania	Canada; United States
The Adventures of Alyonushka and Yeryoma; Приключения Алёнушки и Ерёмы (Priklyucheniya Alyonushki i Yeryomy)	November 29, 2008	Paradise Group	Russia
The Adventures of Dragon Fruit 火龍果大冒險	2006	CGCG Inc	Taiwan
The Adventures of Tintin	December 21, 2011	Paramount Pictures; Columbia Pictures; Nickelodeon Movies; WingNut Films; The Kennedy/Marshall Company; Amblin Entertainment; Hemisphere Media Capital	New Zealand; United States
Adventures in Zambezia	July 3, 2012	Triggerfish Animation Studios; Wonderful Works; 120dB Films	South Africa
After School Midnighters	August 25, 2012	Koo-Ki	Japan
Agent F.O.X.	May 4, 2014	Kunshan Zhangpu Haoshanshui Animation; Beijing Shuzi Linghai Films Technology; Erduosishi Hengqida Media	China
Ainbo: Spirit of the Amazon	February 13, 2021	Tunche Films; Katuni Animation; Cool Beans; EPIC Cine; Comet Film	Peru; Netherlands; Germany
Alexander the Great	March 10, 2006	Difarm Inc. Mondo TV	Italy
A.Li.Ce	February 5, 2000	GAGA Communications	Japan
Alibaba	July 26, 2002	Pentamedia Graphics	India
All I Want for Christmas Is You	November 13, 2017	Universal 1440 Entertainment; Splash Entertainment; Magic Carpet Productions; Universal Animation Studios	United States
Allahyar and the Legend of Markhor	February 2, 2018	3rd World Studios	Pakistan
Allen	November 12, 2026	Ludo Studio	Australia
Alpha and Omega	September 17, 2010	Crest Animation	United States; Canada
Alpha and Omega 2: A Howl-iday Adventure	October 8, 2013	Lionsgate; Crest Animation Productions	United States; Canada
Alpha and Omega 3: The Great Wolf Games	March 25, 2014	Lionsgate; Crest Animation Productions	United States
Alpha and Omega 4: The Legend of the Saw Tooth Cave	October 7, 2014	Lionsgate; Crest Animation Productions	United States
Alpha and Omega 5: Family Vacation	August 4, 2015	Lionsgate; Crest Animation Productions	United States; Canada
Alpha and Omega 6: Dino Digs	May 10, 2016	Lionsgate; Crest Animation Productions	United States; Canada
Alpha and Omega 7: The Big Fureeze	November 8, 2016	Lionsgate; Crest Animation Productions	United States
Alpha and Omega 8: Journey to Bear Kingdom	May 9, 2017	Lionsgate; Crest Animation Productions	United States
The Amazing Maurice	December 16, 2022	Ulysses Filmproduktion; Studio Rakete; Cantilever Media; Narrativia; Sky; Moonshot Films; Red Star 3D; Squeeze Animation Studio	Germany; United Kingdom
Ana and Bruno; Ana y Bruno	June 12, 2017	Altavista Films; Lo Coloco Films; Ítaca Films; Ánima Estudios; Discreet Arts Productions	Mexico
Anchors Up; Elias og Storegaps Hemmelighet	October 6, 2017	Animando AS; Steamheads Studios	Norway
The Angry Birds Movie	May 20, 2016	Rovio Animation	Finland; United States
The Angry Birds Movie 2	August 13, 2019	Rovio Animation; Sony Pictures Animation	Finland; United States
Animal Crackers	September 1, 2017	Netflix; Blue Dream Studios; Storyoscopic Films; Odin's Eye Animation; Mayday MoviesExit Strategy; Beijing Wen Hua Dongrun Investment Co. China Film Group Corporation	United States; Spain; China
Animal Kingdom: Let's Go Ape; Pourquoi j'ai pas mangé mon père	April 8, 2015	Pathé; Boréales; Kiss Films; M6 Films; Cattleya uFilm	Belgium; China; France; Italy
Animals United; Konferenz der Tiere	October 7, 2010	Constantin Film; Ambient Entertainment; Timeless Films; White Horse Pictures	Germany
Anjé: The Legend of the Pyrenees; Anjé, La leyenda del pirineo	December 5, 2002	Baleuko S.L.	Spain
The Ant Bully	July 28, 2006	DNA Productions; Playtone; Legendary Pictures	United States
Antz	October 2, 1998	DreamWorks Animation; Pacific Data Images	United States
Appleseed; Appurushîdo	March 5, 2004	Digital Frontier	Japan
Appleseed Ex Machina; Ekusu makina	October 20, 2007	Micott & Basara; Digital Frontier	Japan
Appleseed Alpha; Appleseed α	July 15, 2014	Lucent Pictures; Sola Digital Arts	Japan
Arctic Dogs	November 29, 2019	AMBI Media Group; AIC Studios; TATATU; Assemblage Entertainment	United States; Canada; Italy; India
Ark	June 2, 2005	Digital Dream Studios	United States; South Korea
Arthur and the Invisibles; Arthur et les Minimoys	November 29, 2006	Avalanche Productions	France
Arthur and the Revenge of Maltazard; Arthur et la vengeance de Maltazard	December 2, 2009	EuropaCorp	France
Arthur Christmas	November 23, 2011	Aardman Animations; Sony Pictures Animation	United States; United Kingdom
Arthur 3: The War of the Two Worlds; Arthur et la guerre des deux mondes	October 13, 2010	EuropaCorp	France
Asterix: The Mansions of the Gods; Astérix : Le Domaine des dieux	November 26, 2014	SND Films; Mac Guff	France; Belgium
Asterix: The Secret of the Magic Potion; Astérix: Le Secret de la Potion Magique	December 5, 2018	SND Films; Mac Guff	France; Belgium
Astro Boy	October 23, 2009	Imagi Animation Studios	Hong Kong; United States
Astro Kid; Terra Willy, planète inconnue	April 5, 2019	TAT Productions; BAC Films; Master Films	France
Atagoal: Cat's Magical Forest アタゴオルは猫の森	October 14, 2006	Digital Frontier	Japan
Azur & Asmar: The Princes' Quest; Azur et Asmar	October 25, 2006	Diaphana Films	France; Belgium; Spain; Italy
Back to the Outback	December 10, 2021	Netflix Animation; Reel FX Animation Studios; Weed Road Pictures	United States; Australia; Canada
Backkom Bear: Agent 008	January 13, 2017	Alpha Pictures; Harbin Pinge Media; Pinngo; RG Animation Studios	China
Bad Cat; Kötü Kedi Serafettin	February 5, 2016	Anima Istanbul; Kare Kare Film Yapim	Turkey
The Bad Guys	April 22, 2022	DreamWorks Animation	United States
The Bad Guys 2	August 1, 2025	DreamWorks Animation	United States
Bal Ganesh	October 26, 2007	Shemaroo Entertainment; Astute Media Vision	India
Ballerina; Leap!	December 14, 2016	Quad Productions; Main Journey; Caramel Film	Canada
Barbaricina History	April 13, 2017	Slyers Animation Studios	Russia
Barbie & Chelsea: The Lost Birthday	April 16, 2021	Mattel Entertainment	United States
Barbie & Her Sisters in A Pony Tale	October 22, 2013	Universal Studios; Arc Productions; Rainmaker Studios	United States
Barbie & Her Sisters in The Great Puppy Adventure	October 20, 2015	Universal Studios; Arc Productions; Rainmaker Studios	United States
Barbie & Her Sisters in A Puppy Chase	October 18, 2016	Universal Studios; Arc Productions; Rainmaker Studios	United States
Barbie and the Diamond Castle	September 7, 2008	Rainmaker Entertainment	United States
Barbie and the Magic of Pegasus	September 18, 2005	Mainframe Entertainment; Mattel Entertainment	Canada; United States
Barbie and the Secret Door	August 7, 2014	Universal Studios; Arc Productions; Rainmaker Studios	United States
Barbie and the Three Musketeers	September 15, 2009	Rainmaker Entertainment	United States
Barbie as Rapunzel	October 1, 2002	Mainframe Entertainment; Mattel Entertainment	Canada; United States
Barbie as the Island Princess	September 18, 2007	Rainmaker Entertainment	United States
Barbie as the Princess and the Pauper	September 28, 2004	Rainmaker Entertainment; Mattel Entertainment	Canada; United States
Barbie Diaries	April 30, 2006	Curios Pictures; Mattel Entertainment	United States
Barbie: Dolphin Magic	September 18, 2017	Universal Studios; Arc Productions; Rainmaker Studios	United States
Barbie Fairytopia: Magic of the Rainbow	March 11, 2007	Rainmaker Entertainment	United States
Barbie in a Christmas Carol	November 4, 2008	Rainmaker Entertainment	United States
Barbie in A Mermaid Tale	March 9, 2010	Rainmaker Entertainment	United States
Barbie in A Mermaid Tale 2	February 27, 2012	Universal Studios; Arc Productions; Rainmaker Studios	United States
Barbie in Princess Power	March 3, 2015	Universal Studios; Arc Productions; Rainmaker Studios	United States
Barbie in Rock'n Royals	September 8, 2015	Universal Studios; Arc Productions; Rainmaker Studios	United States
Barbie in the 12 Dancing Princesses	September 10, 2006	Mainframe Entertainment; Mattel Entertainment	United States
Barbie in the Nutcracker	October 2, 2001	Mainframe Entertainment; Mattel Entertainment	Canada; United States
Barbie in the Pink Shoes	February 28, 2013	Universal Studios; Arc Productions; Rainmaker Studios	United States
Barbie of Swan Lake	September 30, 2003	Mainframe Entertainment; Mattel Entertainment	Canada; United States
Barbie Presents: Thumbelina	March 17, 2009	Rainmaker Entertainment	United States
Barbie: Big City, Big Dreams	September 1, 2021	Mattel Entertainment	United States
Barbie: Fairytopia	March 6, 2005	Mainframe Entertainment; Mattel Entertainment	Canada; United States
Barbie Mariposa	February 26, 2008	Rainmaker Entertainment	United States
Barbie: Mariposa & the Fairy Princess	August 27, 2013	Universal Studios; Arc Productions; Rainmaker Studios	United States
Barbie: Princess Adventure	September 1, 2020	Mattel Entertainment	United States
Barbie: A Fairy Secret	March 15, 2011	Rainmaker Entertainment	United States
Barbie: A Fashion Fairy Tale	September 14, 2010	Rainmaker Entertainment	United States
Barbie: A Perfect Christmas	November 8, 2011	Rainmaker Entertainment	United States
Barbie: Princess Charm School	September 13, 2011	Rainmaker Entertainment	United States
Barbie: Spy Squad	January 15, 2016	Universal Studios; Arc Productions; Rainmaker Studios	United States
Barbie: Star Light Adventure	July 30, 2016	Universal Studios; Arc Productions; Rainmaker Studios	United States
Barbie: The Pearl Princess	February 15, 2014	Universal Studios; Arc Productions; Rainmaker Studios	United States
Barbie: The Princess & the Popstar	September 11, 2012	Universal Studios; Arc Productions; Rainmaker Studios	United States
Barbie: Video Game Hero	January 31, 2017	Universal Studios; Arc Productions; Rainmaker Studios	United States
Barnyard	August 4, 2006	Nickelodeon Movies; O Entertainment	United States
Battle for Terra	May 1, 2009	IM Global; Snoot Toons	United States
The Bee Julia and Mrs. Vita; L'Apetta Giulia e la signora Vita	September 19, 2003	Esse Ci Cinematografica; Kino Bez Granits	Italy
Bee Movie	November 2, 2007	DreamWorks Animation	United States
Beowulf	November 16, 2007	ImageMovers; Shangri-La Entertainment	United States
Berserk: The Golden Age Arc I - The Egg of the King	February 4, 2012	Studio 4°C	Japan
Berserk: The Golden Age Arc II - The Battle for Doldrey	June 23, 2012	Studio 4°C	Japan
Berserk: The Golden Age Arc III - The Advent	February 1, 2013	Studio 4°C	Japan
Betizu izar artean	October 31, 2003	Baleuko S.L.	Spain
The Big Fighting between Wukong and God Erlang (Wukong Da Zhan Er Lang Shen)	June 1, 2007		China
Big Hero 6	November 7, 2014	Walt Disney Animation Studios	United States
The Big Trip	November 7, 2019	Licensing Brands	Russia
Big Trip 2: Special Delivery	October 27, 2022		Russia
Bigfoot Family	August 5, 2020	nWave Pictures; Octopolis	Belgium; France
Bilal: A New Breed of Hero	September 8, 2016	Barajoun Entertainment	United Arab Emirates
Bionicle: Mask of Light	September 16, 2003	Buena Vista Home Entertainment; Miramax Films	United States
Birds Like Us; Ptice kao mi	May 5, 2017	Lionsgate; Grindstone Entertainment Group; Kaleidoscope Film Distribution	Bosnia and Herzegovina; Turkey; United Kingdom; United States; Qatar
Birdvillage Beak's Adventure	1999	Cawthon Entertainment	United States
Birdvillage Beak's Snowball Fight	1999	Cawthon Entertainment	United States
Birdvillage Beak's Vacation	1999	Cawthon Entertainment	United States
Birdvillage: Second Nest	2003	Cawthon Entertainment	United States
Birdvillage: The Movie	2003	Cawthon Entertainment	United States
Blame!	May 20, 2017	Polygon Pictures	Japan
Blinky Bill the Movie	September 17, 2015	Flying Bark Productions	Australia
Blue Remains	August 22, 2001	GAGA Communications	Japan
Bob the Builder: Mega Machines	May 27, 2017	HIT Entertainment	United States
Bobbleheads: The Movie	December 8, 2020	Universal Pictures Home Entertainment	United States
BoBoiBoy Movie 2	August 8, 2019	Animonsta Studios	Malaysia
BoBoiBoy: The Movie	March 3, 2016	Animonsta Studios	Malaysia
Bolt	November 21, 2008	Walt Disney Animation Studios	United States
Bonobono: Kumomo no Ki no Koto	August 10, 2002	Amuse Pictures (now Showgate Inc.)	Japan
Boo, Zino & the Snurks	March 18, 2004	Warner Bros. Pictures; Entertainment Film Distributors; Barton Films	Germany; United Kingdom; Spain
The Book of Life	October 17, 2014	Reel FX Animation Studios; 20th Century Animation; Chatrone	United States
Boonie Bears: Entangled Worlds	January 28, 2017	Le vision pictures	China
The Boss Baby	March 31, 2017	DreamWorks Animation	United States
The Boss Baby: Family Business	July 2, 2021	DreamWorks Animation	United States
The Boxcar Children	August 25, 2014	Hammerhead Productions	United States
The Boxcar Children: Surprise Island	May 8, 2018	Legacy Classics Family Entertainment	United States
Bratz Babyz Save Christmas	November 5, 2008	MGA Entertainment	United States
Bratz: Desert Jewelz	January 10, 2012	MGA Entertainment	United States
Bratz Fashion Pixiez	February 27, 2007	Lions Gate Entertainment	United States
Bratz Genie Magic	April 11, 2006	Mike Young Productions; MGA Entertainment	United States
Bratz: Girlz Really Rock	September 22, 2008	MGA Entertainment	United States
Bratz: Go to Paris the Movie	October 5, 2013	MGA Entertainment	United States
Bratz Kidz Fairy Tales	February 26, 2008	MGA Entertainment	United States
Bratz Kidz: Sleep-Over Adventure	July 31, 2007	Lions Gate Entertainment	United States
Bratz: Pampered Petz	October 5, 2010	Mike Young Productions; MGA Entertainment	United States
Bratz: Passion 4 Fashion Diamondz	September 26, 2006	MGA Entertainment	United States
Bratz – Rock Angelz	October 4, 2005	MGA Entertainment	United States
Bratz: Super Babyz	October 9, 2007	Mike Young Productions; MGA Entertainment	United States
Brave	June 22, 2012	Pixar Animation Studios	United States
A Bug's Life	November 20, 1998	Pixar Animation Studios	United States
Butterfly Tale	October 13, 2023	CarpeDiem Film & TV; Ulysses Filmproduktion; Senator Film Köln	Canada; Germany
Captain Avispa; Capitán Avispa	April 4, 2024	Guerra Toons	Dominican Republic
Captain Underpants: The First Epic Movie	June 2, 2017	DreamWorks Animation	United States
Capture the Flag	July 25, 2015	Lightbox Entertainment	Spain
A Car's Life: Sparky's Big Adventure	November 21, 2006	Spark Plug Entertainment	United States
Care Bears: Big Wish Movie	October 18, 2005	Nelvana Limited; American Greetings	Canada
Care Bears: Journey to Joke-a-lot	October 5, 2004	Nelvana Limited; Sparx Animation Studios; American Greetings	United States; Canada
Care Bears: Oopsy Does It!	August 4, 2007	SD Entertainment; American Greetings; The Hatchery	United States
Cars	June 9, 2006	Pixar Animation Studios	United States
Cars 2	June 24, 2011	Pixar Animation Studios	United States
Cars 3	June 16, 2017	Pixar Animation Studios	United States
Casper's Haunted Christmas	October 31, 2000	The Harvey Entertainment Company; Mainframe Entertainment	Canada
Casper's Scare School	October 20, 2006	Kapow Pictures; Alligator Planet; Classic Media	United States; Australia; India
Cassiopeia	April 1, 1996	NDR Filmes	Brazil
The Cat in the Hat	November 6, 2026	Warner Bros. Pictures Animation; Dr. Seuss Enterprises	United States
Cats and Peachtopia	April 5, 2018	Light Chaser Animation Studios	China
Cats in the Museum	March 23, 2023	Licensing Brands	Russia
Cats in the Museum 2: Treasures of Egypt	March 26, 2026	Licensing Brands; Cinema Foundation of Russia	Russia
Chaar Sahibzaade	November 6, 2014	Interactive Realities International Pvt. Ltd. Baweja Movies	India
Chaar Sahibzaade 2: Rise of Banda Singh Bahadur	November 11, 2016	Interactive Realities International Pvt. Ltd. Baweja Movies	India
Charlie the Wonderdog	October 24, 2025	Centurion Pictures; ICON Creative Studio	Canada
Charming	April 20, 2018	3QU Media; Vanguard Animation; WV Enterprises	Canada; United States
Checkered Ninja; Ternet Ninja	December 25, 2018	A. Film; Pop Up Production; Sudoku ApS	Denmark
Checkered Ninja 2 Ternet Ninja 2	August 19, 2021	A. Film; Pop Up Production; Sudoku ApS	Denmark
Checkered Ninja 3 Ternet Ninja 3	August 21, 2025	A. Film	Denmark
Chickenhare and the Hamster of Darkness	January 23, 2022	Netflix nWave Pictures; Sony Pictures International Productions	France
Chickenhare and the Secret of the Groundhog	October 10, 2025	nWave Studios; SND; Octopolis	France; Belgium; United States
Chicken Little	November 4, 2005	Walt Disney Feature Animation	United States
A Christmas Carol	November 6, 2009	ImageMovers Digital	United States
A Christmas Carol: Scrooge's Ghostly Tale	November 6, 2006	BKN	United States
Cinderella the Cat; Gatta Cenerentola	September 14, 2017	Mad Entertainment	Italy
Cloudy with a Chance of Meatballs	September 18, 2009	Sony Pictures Animation	United States
Cloudy with a Chance of Meatballs 2	September 27, 2013	Sony Pictures Animation	United States
Coco	November 22, 2017	Pixar Animation Studios	United States
Condorito The Movie; Condorito: la película	November 12, 2017	Aronnax Animation Studios; Pajarraco Films, LLC	Chile; Peru; Mexico; Argentina
Combat Wombat	October 11, 2020	Like a Photon Creative	Australia
Combat Wombat: Back 2 Back	February 29, 2024	Like a Photon Creative	Australia
The Croods	March 22, 2013	DreamWorks Animation	United States
The Croods: A New Age	November 25, 2020	DreamWorks Animation	United States
Daddy, I'm a Zombie; Papá, soy una zombi	November 25, 2011	Abra Producciones; Digital Dreams Films	Spain
Daisy Quokka: World's Scariest Animal	February 4, 2021	Like a Photon Creative	Australia
Dajjal: The Slayer and His Followers	December 2018	WBJ Media; Messenger2050	Pakistan
David	December 19, 2025	2521 Entertainment; Slingshot Productions; Sunrise Animation Studios	South Africa; United States
DC League of Super-Pets	July 29, 2022	Warner Animation Group; DC Entertainment; Seven Bucks Productions	United States
Dead Space: Aftermath	January 25, 2011	Starz Media; Film Roman; Pumpkin Studio; Electronic Arts	United States
Deep	August 25, 2017	The Thinklab; Grid Animation; Kraken Films	Spain; United States
Delhi Safari	October 19, 2012	Krayon Pictures	India
Delgo	December 12, 2008	Electric Eye Entertainment Corporation; Fathom Studios	United States
Despicable Me	July 9, 2010	Illumination	United States
Despicable Me 2	July 3, 2013	Illumination	United States
Despicable Me 3	June 30, 2017	Illumination	United States
Despicable Me 4	July 3, 2024	Illumination	United States
Dheera	January 15, 2013	Adlabs; Orcher Studios	India
Diary of a Wimpy Kid	December 3, 2021	Walt Disney Pictures; Bardel Entertainment	United States; Canada
Diary of a Wimpy Kid Christmas: Cabin Fever	December 8, 2023	Walt Disney Pictures; Bardel Entertainment	United States; Canada
Diary of a Wimpy Kid: Rodrick Rules	December 2, 2022	Walt Disney Pictures; Bardel Entertainment	United States; Canada
Diary of a Wimpy Kid: The Last Straw	December 5, 2025	Walt Disney Pictures; Bardel Entertainment	United States; Canada
Dinosaur	May 19, 2000	Walt Disney Feature Animation	United States
Dino Time	November 30, 2012	CJ Entertainment; Myriad Pictures; Toiion	South Korea
Disco Worms	January 16, 2009	Crone Film; Radar Film	Denmark; Germany
The District! Nyócker!	December 9, 2004	Lichthof	Hungary
Dog Gone Trouble	August 8, 2019	Vanguard Animation; 3QU Media; Cinesite; Comic Animations; WV Enterprises	United States; Canada
Dog Man	January 31, 2025	DreamWorks Animation	United States
Dogtanian and the Three Muskehounds	August 18, 2021	Apolo Films; Cosmos-Maya	Spain; India
The Dolphin: Story of a Dreamer; El Delfin: La Historia de un Soñador	October 9, 2009	Dolphin Films	Peru; Germany; Italy
Dominator	May 21, 2003	Renga Media	United Kingdom
The Donkey King	October 13, 2018	Talisman Animation Studios	Pakistan
Donkey Xote	November 22, 2007	Filmax Animation; Lumiq Studios; Acción Media; Don Quijote De La Mancha 2005, S.A. Bren Entertainment, S.A. Castelao Productions, S.A; TVE	Spain; Italy
Doru	July 7, 2017	Anibera Animation Studios	Turkey
Dragon Age: Dawn of the Seeker	February 11, 2012	Funimation Entertainment; Oxybot	Japan
Dragon Ball Super: Super Hero	June 11, 2022	Toei Animation	Japan
Dragon Hunters; Chasseurs de dragons	March 19, 2008	Futurikon	France; Germany; Luxembourg
Dragon Nest: Rise of the Black Dragon	May 20, 2014		China
Dragon Rider	October 1, 2020	Constantin Film; Rise FX; Cyborn	Germany; Belgium
DragonBlade: The Legend of Lang 龍刀奇緣	January 6, 2005	DCDC; China Film	Hong Kong
Dragonlance: Dragons of Autumn Twilight	January 15, 2008	Commotion Pictures; Toonz Animation India; Witox	United States
Dragons: Fire and Ice	October 12, 2004	Mega Bloks Inc. Bardel Entertainment	Canada
Dragons: Destiny of Fire; Dragones: destino de fuego	July 27, 2006	AlpaMayo Ent.	Peru
Dreambuilders	February 6, 2020	Splendid Animation; Creative Europe MEDIA; SF Studios; First Lady Film	Denmark
Duck Duck Goose	April 20, 2018	Netflix; GFM Animation; Wanda Pictures; Original Force Animation; Jiangsu Yuandongli Computer Animation Co., Ltd	United States; China
Earwig and the Witch	October 18, 2020	Studio Ghibli	Japan
Egon & Dönci	November 29, 2007	Tax Free Film	Hungary
Ejen Ali The Movie	November 28, 2019	WAU Animation; Primeworks Studios	Malaysia
Ejen Ali The Movie 2	May 22, 2025	WAU Animation; Komet Productions	Malaysia
El Americano: The Movie	August 28, 2015	Animex; Anáhuac Films; Olmos Productions; Phil Roman Entertainment	Mexico; United States
Elemental	June 16, 2023	Pixar Animation Studios	United States
The Elephant King	May 1, 2017	Honarpooya Group	Iran
Elf Bowling the Movie: The Great North Pole Elf Strike	October 2, 2007	Film Brokers International; Great Highway Company	United States
The Elf Who Stole Christmas; Olentzero y El Iratxo	December 2, 2011	Baleuko S.L. Talope	Spain
The Elfkins – Baking a Difference	October 8, 2019	Akkord Film	Germany
Elias and the Royal Yacht; Elias og Kongeskipet	February 23, 2007	Filmkameratene A/S	Norway
Elio	June 20, 2025	Pixar Animation Studios	United States
Ella Bella Bingo	January 24, 2020	Studio 100 Film; Spinville; Kool Produktion	Norway
Elliot the Littlest Reindeer	December 4, 2018	Awesometown Entertainment; Double Dutch International; Elgin Road Productions	Canada
Elysium	August 15, 2003	Big Film Entertainment	South Korea
El Guerrero sin Nombre	November 4, 2005	Patagonik Film Group; Tornasol Films	Argentina; Spain
The Emoji Movie	July 28, 2017	Sony Pictures Animation	United States
The Emperor's Secret; Keisarin salaisuus	September 8, 2006	Helsinki Filmi Oy	Finland
Encanto	November 24, 2021	Walt Disney Animation Studios	United States
Epic	May 24, 2013	Blue Sky Studios	United States
Epic Tails; Pattie et la colère de Poséidon	January 25, 2023	TAT Productions; Apollo Films	France
Escape from Planet Earth	February 15, 2013	Rainmaker Entertainment	United States; Canada
Especial; Особенный (Osobennyy)	August 2006	Animagic	Russia
Everyone's Hero	September 15, 2006	IDT Entertainment	United States
Extinct	February 11, 2021	China Lion; HB Wink Animation; Huayi Brothers; Tolerable Entertainment; Cinesite; Timeless Films	Canada; United States; China
Falcon Express	July 2, 2025	TAT Productions; Apollo Films	France
Fantastic Journey to OZ	April 20, 2017	Melnitsa Animation Studio	Russia
Fantastic Return to Oz; Урфин Джюс возвращается	October 24, 2019	Melnitsa Animation Studio	Russia
Fearless	August 14, 2020	Vanguard Animation; 3QU Media; New Hero; Cinesite; Comic Animations	Canada; United States
Fear(s) of the Dark; Peur(s) du noir	February 13, 2008	Prima Linea Productions	France
Ferdinand	December 15, 2017	Blue Sky Studios	United States
Film Noir	March 2, 2007	EasyE Films	United States; Serbia
Final Fantasy VII Advent Children	September 14, 2005	Square Enix	Japan
Final Fantasy: The Spirits Within	July 2, 2001	Square Pictures	United States; Japan
Finding Dory	June 17, 2016	Pixar Animation Studios	United States
Finding Nemo	May 30, 2003	Pixar Animation Studios	United States
Finnick	March 24, 2022	Petersburg Animation Studio; Riki Group	Russia
Finnick 2	October 23, 2025	Riki Group	Russia
Fireheart	July 13, 2022	L'Atelier Animation; Anton; Caramel Films	United States; Canada; France
The Fixies: Top Secret; Фиксики: Большой секрет	October 28, 2017	Aeroplane Productions; Petersburg Animation Studio	Russia
Fixies vs. Crabots; Фиксики против кработов	December 21, 2019	Aeroplane Productions; Petersburg Animation Studio	Russia
Flatland the Film	January 14, 2007	Flatland Productions	United States
Fleak	September 5, 2025	Anima Vitae; Animoon; Godo Films	Finland
The Flight Before Christmas; Niko - Lentäjän poika	September 22, 2008	Anima Vitae; Cinemaker Oy; A. Film A/S; Ulysses Filmproduktion; Magma Films	Finland; Denmark; Germany; Ireland
Flushed Away	November 3, 2006	Aardman Animations; DreamWorks Animation	United Kingdom; United States
Fly Me to the Moon	January 30, 2008	nWave Pictures; Illuminata Pictures; Le Tax Shelter du Gouvernement Fédéral de Belgique uMedia uFilm	Belgium; United States
A Fox's Tale; Kis Vuk	April 17, 2008	DYN Entertainment	Hungary; United Kingdom
Foodfight!	August 17, 2012	Threshold Animation Studios; Fireman's Fund Insurance Company	United States
Forgotten Island	September 25, 2026	DreamWorks Animation	United States
Freddy Frogface; Orla Frøsnapper	June 1, 2011	Crone Film Produktion A/S	Denmark
Free Birds	November 8, 2013	Reel FX Animation Studios	United States
Free Jimmy; Slipp Jimmy fri	March 17, 2006	StormStudio	Norway; United Kingdom
Friends Forever	2007	Davis Entertainment; Paws, Inc. The Animation Picture Company	India
The Frog Kingdom 青蛙王国	December 28, 2013	Vixo	China
The Frog Kingdom 2: Sub-Zero Mission	February 19, 2016		China
The Frogville 桃蛙源记	October 3, 2014		Taiwan
Frozen	November 27, 2013	Walt Disney Animation Studios	United States
Frozen 2	November 27, 2019	Walt Disney Animation Studios	United States
Friends: Naki on Monster Island friends もののけ島のナキ	December 17, 2011	Toho	Japan
Foosball; Metegol	July 18, 2013	Illusion Studios; 100 Bares	Argentina
G.I. Joe: Spy Troops	September 27, 2003	Reel FX Creative Studios; Hasbro	United States
G.I. Joe: Valor vs. Venom	September 14, 2004	Reel FX Creative Studios; Hasbro Entertainment	United States
Gantz: O	October 14, 2016	Digital Frontier	Japan
Garfield Gets Real	November 20, 2007	Paws, Inc. The Animation Picture Company	United States; South Korea
The Garfield Movie	May 24, 2024	Alcon Entertainment; DNEG Animation; One Cool Group; Wayfarer Studios; Stage 6 Films; Andrews McMeel Entertainment; John Cohen Productions	United States; United Kingdom; Hong Kong
Garfield's Fun Fest	August 5, 2008	Paws, Inc. The Animation Picture Company	United States; South Korea
Garfield's Pet Force	June 16, 2009	Paws, Inc. The Animation Picture Company	United States; South Korea
Garm Wars: the Last D ruid	October 25, 2014	Production I.G; Bandai Namco Entertainment	Japan; Canada
Gaturro	September 9, 2010	Toonz Entertainment; Illusion Studios; Ánima Estudios; Voltage Pictures	Argentina; India; Mexico
Gene-Fusion	May 10, 2011		United States
Geng: The Adventure Begins; Geng: Pengembaraan Bermula	February 12, 2009	Les' Copaque Production	Malaysia
Get Squirrely	November 4, 2016	Vanguard Animation	United States
Ghost in the Shell 2.0 攻殻機動隊 2.0 (Gōsuto In Za Sheru/Kōkaku Kidōtai 2.0)	July 12, 2008	Production I.G	Japan
Giants of La Mancha	March 28, 2024	3 Doubles Producciones; GF Films; GGVFX; M.A.R.K.13™ Studio 100; Studio Isar Animation	Argentina; Germany
Gladiators of Rome; Gladiatori di Roma	October 18, 2012	Rainbow S.p.A.(Viacom)	Italy
Gladiformers – Transforming Gladiators; Gladiformers – Robos Gladiatores	July 17, 2007	Video Brinquedo	Brazil
Gladiformers 2 Gladiformers 2	July 17, 2009	Video Brinquedo	Brazil
Glup, an Adventure Without Waste; Glup, una aventura sin desperdicio	April 2, 2004		Spain
Gnome Alone	March 2, 2018	Vanguard Animation; SC Films International; 3QU Media; Comic Animations	United States; Canada; China
Gnomeo & Juliet	February 11, 2011	Rocket Pictures; Starz Animation	United Kingdom; United States; Canada
Gnomes and Trolls: The Secret Chamber; Tomtar & troll - Den hemliga kammaren	January 31, 2008	White Shark	Sweden
Goat	February 13, 2026	Sony Pictures Animation; Unanimous Media; Modern Magic	United States
Goat Story - The Old Prague Legends; Kozí příbêh - povêsti staré Prahy	October 16, 2008	Art and Animation Studio	Czech Republic
Goat Story 2 Kozí příbêh se sýrem	October 25, 2012	Art and Animation Studio	Czech Republic
God's Faithful Servant: Barla	November 4, 2011	Samanyolu TV	Turkey
Godzilla: Planet of the Monsters 怪獣惑星	November 17, 2017	Polygon Pictures; Toho	Japan
The Good Dinosaur	November 25, 2015	Pixar Animation Studios	United States
Grand Prix of Europe	July 24, 2025	Mack Magic; Timeless Films	Germany; United Kingdom
The Great Bear; Den kæmpestore bjørn	February 10, 2011	Copenhagen Bombay	Denmark
The Great Pig Pirate Mateo 날으는 돼지 해적 마테오	July 24, 2004		South Korea
Green Election Campaign	May 2, 2018	SN Animations	Pakistan
The Grinch	November 9, 2018	Illumination	United States
Guardians of Oz; Guardianes de Oz	April 10, 2015	Ánima Estudios	Mexico; India
Gulliver Returns	August 19, 2021	B&H Film Distribution; All Rights Entertainment	Ukraine
Gulliver's Travel	December 23, 2005	Pentamedia Graphics	India
Happily N'Ever After	January 5, 2007	Berliner Film Companie; Berlin Animation Film; Odyssey Entertainment; Vanguard Animation	United States
Happily N'Ever After 2: Snow White—Another Bite @ the Apple	March 24, 2009	Kickstart Productions; Berlin Animation Film	United States; Germany
The Happy Cricket and the Giant Bugs; O Grilo Feliz e os Insetos Gigantes	January 9, 2009	Start Desenhos Animados	Brazil
Happy Feet	November 17, 2006	Village Roadshow Pictures; Animal Logic; Kennedy Miller Productions; Kingdom Feature Productions	United States; Australia
Happy Feet Two	November 23, 2011	Village Roadshow Pictures; Kennedy Miller Mitchell; Dr. D Studios	United States; Australia
Harvie and the Magic Museum; Гурвинек: Волшебная игра Hurvínek a kouzelné muzeum	August 31, 2017	KinoAtis; Grid Animation; Rolling Pictures	Russia; Czech Republic; Belgium
Here Comes Peter Cottontail: The Movie	September 17, 2005		United States; Australia
The Hero of Color City	October 3, 2014	Exodus Film Group; Magnolia Pictures	United States
Hero of the Rails	September 8, 2009	HIT Entertainment	United Kingdom
Hidden Treasure of Wompkee Wood	May 2009	Deos Animation; MarVista Entertainment; Wompkees	United States
Hitpig!	November 1, 2024	Aniventure; Cinesite; Rosebud Enterprises	United Kingdom; Canada; United States
Home	March 27, 2015	DreamWorks Animation	United States
Hoodwinked Too! Hood vs. Evil	April 29, 2011	Kanbar Entertainment	United States
Hoodwinked!	January 13, 2006	Kanbar Entertainment; Kanbar Animation; Blue Yonder Films	United States
Hoppers	March 6, 2026	Pixar Animation Studios	United States
Horton Hears a Who!	March 14, 2008	Blue Sky Studios	United States
Hotel Transylvania	September 28, 2012	Sony Pictures Animation	United States
Hotel Transylvania 2	September 25, 2015	Sony Pictures Animation	United States
Hotel Transylvania 3: Summer Vacation	July 13, 2018	Sony Pictures Animation	United States
Hotel Transylvania: Transformania	January 14, 2022	Amazon Studios; Sony Pictures Animation; MRC	United States
The House of Magic	December 25, 2013	nWave Pictures; Anton Capital Entertainment uMedia	Belgium; France
How the Hampsters Saved Winter	April 2, 2009	Abatis International LLC; Unreal Productions	United States
How to Train Your Dragon	March 26, 2010	DreamWorks Animation	United States
How to Train Your Dragon 2	June 13, 2014	DreamWorks Animation	United States
How to Train Your Dragon: The Hidden World	February 22, 2019	DreamWorks Animation	United States
Ice Age	March 15, 2002	Blue Sky Studios	United States
The Ice Age Adventures of Buck Wild	January 28, 2022	20th Century Animation; Bardel Entertainment	Canada; United States
Ice Age: Collision Course	July 22, 2016	Blue Sky Studios	United States
Ice Age: Continental Drift	July 13, 2012	Blue Sky Studios	United States
Ice Age: Dawn of the Dinosaurs	July 1, 2009	Blue Sky Studios	United States
Ice Age: The Meltdown	March 31, 2006	Blue Sky Studios	United States
Igor	September 19, 2008	Metro-Goldwyn-Mayer; Exodus Film Group	United States; France
Immortal	March 24, 2004	Duran Entertainment; Quantic Dream	France
Impy's Island; Urmel aus dem Eis	August 3, 2006	Ambient Entertainment	Germany
Impy's Wonderland; Urmel voll in Fahrt	May 1, 2008	Ambient Entertainment	Germany
In Search of Santa	November 23, 2004	Colorland Animation; Tundra Productions	United States; Hong Kong
In Your Dreams	November 14, 2025	Netflix Animation Studios; Kuku Studios	United States
The Incredibles	November 5, 2004	Pixar Animation Studios	United States
Incredibles 2	June 15, 2018	Pixar Animation Studios	United States
The Incredible Story of the Giant Pear; Den utrolige historie om den kæmpestore pære	October 12, 2017	Level K	Denmark
Inside Out	June 19, 2015	Pixar Animation Studios	United States
Inside Out 2	June 14, 2024	Pixar Animation Studios	United States
The Inseparables	August 10, 2023	nWave Studios; Belga Films; A Contracorriente Films; Viva Pictures	Belgium; France; Spain
Inspector Gadget's Biggest Caper Ever	September 6, 2005	DIC Entertainment	Canada; United States
Inspector Sun and the Curse of the Black Widow; Inspector Sun y la maldición de la viuda negra	December 28, 2022	The Thinklab; Kapers Animation; Gordon Box; 3Doubles Producciones; Particular Crowd	Spain
Izzie's Way Home	May 17, 2016	The Asylum	United States
Jack and the Cuckoo-Clock Heart; Jack et la Mécanique du cœur	February 5, 2014	Duran; EuropaCorp; France 3 Cinéma uFilm; Walking the Dog	France
Janus: Prajurit Terakhir	April 27, 2003	Multivision Plus	Indonesia
Jasper: Journey to the End of the World; Jasper und das Limonadenkomplott	August 13, 2009	Amuse Films; Toons'N'Tales	Germany
Jimmy Neutron: Boy Genius	December 21, 2001	Nickelodeon Movies; O Entertainment; DNA Productions	United States
Jock the Hero Dog	July 29, 2011	Jock Animation; ARC Entertainment	South Africa
Jonah: A VeggieTales Movie	October 4, 2002	Big Idea Productions; F·H·E Pictures	United States
Journey to Saturn; Rejsen til Saturn	September 26, 2008	A. Film A/S; TV2 Denmark	Denmark
Jungo Goes Bananas: Jungo III; Jungledyret Hugo: Fræk, flabet og fri	December 2, 2007	A. Film A/S; Per Holst Film; Asta Film ApS	Denmark
The Jungle Book	April 15, 2016	Walt Disney Pictures; Fairview Entertainment	United States
Jungle Book: Rikki-Tikki-Tavi to the Rescue	2006	BKN International	Germany
Jungle Beat: The Movie	June 15, 2020	Netflix; Sunrise Productions; Sandcastle Studios	Mauritius; South Africa
Jungle Beat 2: The Past	June 26, 2025	Sunrise Productions; Sandcastle Studios	Mauritius; South Africa
The Jungle Bunch; Les As de la jungle	July 26, 2017	TAT Productions; SND Groupe M6	France
The Jungle Bunch 2: World Tour; Les As de la jungle 2: Opération tour du monde	August 16, 2023	TAT Productions; SND Groupe M6	France
The Jungle Bunch: Back to the Ice Floe; Les As de la Jungle – Operation banquise	December 31, 2011	TAT Productions	France
Jungle Master	January 19, 2013	Hippo Animation	China
Jungle Shuffle	October 2, 2014	Animation Picture Company; Avikoo Studios; Emotion Collective Design; Westbridge University - WEFISWonder; World Studios; CG Makers; Woori Investment Co.	South Korea; Mexico; Colombia
Justin and the Knights of Valour; Justin y la espada del valor	September 20, 2013	Aliwood Mediterráneo Producciones; Kandor Graphics; Out of the Box Features	Spain; United Kingdom; United States
Kaena: The Prophecy; Kaena: La prophétie	June 4, 2003	Xilam	France
Karol	2007	Mondo TV	Italy
Khan Kluay	May 18, 2006	Kantana Animation; Kantana Group Public Co. Sahamongkol Film International	Thailand
Khan Kluay 2	March 26, 2009	Kantana Animation	Thailand
Khumba	October 25, 2013	Triggerfish Animation Studios; Spier Films	South Africa
KikoRiki: Deja Vu; Смешарики. Дежавю	April 26, 2018	Petersburg Animation Studio	Russia
KikoRiki: Legend of the Golden Dragon; Смешарики. Легенда о золотом драконе	March 17, 2016	Petersburg Animation Studio; Art Pictures Studio	Russia
KikoRiki: Team Invincible; Смешарики. Начало	December 22, 2011	Petersburg Animation Studio; The Riki Group; Bazelevs; Cinema Foundation	Russia
Killer Bean Forever	July 14, 2009	Killer Bean Studios	United States
The King of Kings	April 11, 2025	Mofac Studios	United States; South Korea
The King of Milu Deer 麋鹿王	September 29, 2009	Zhonke Weiwo Digital Technology	China
Kingsglaive: Final Fantasy XV	July 9, 2016	Visual Works; Digic Pictures; Image Engine; Marza Animation Planet	Japan
Kirikou and the Men and Women	October 3, 2012	Les Armateurs; Les Armateurs; Mac Guff Ligne; France 3 Cinéma; Studio O	France
Knight Kris	November 22, 2017	Viva Fantasia	Indonesia
Kochadaiiyaan	May 23, 2014	Eros International; Media One Global Entertainment	India
Kong: Return to the Jungle	2006		United States
KPop Demon Hunters	June 20, 2025	Netflix; Sony Pictures Animation	United States
Krakatuk	2007		Russia
Krishna	September 26, 2006	Shethia Audio Video Pvt. Ltd.	India
Kungfu Master aka Wong Fei Hong vs Kungfu Panda 黃飛鴻大戰功夫熊貓	August 30, 2009		China
Kung Fu Panda	June 6, 2008	DreamWorks Animation	United States
Kung Fu Panda 2	May 26, 2011	DreamWorks Animation	United States
Kung Fu Panda 3	January 29, 2016	DreamWorks Animation	United States; China
Kung Fu Panda 4	March 8, 2024	DreamWorks Animation	United States
Kurt Turns Evil; Kurt blir grusom	June 19, 2009	Nordisk Film; A. Film	Norway; Denmark
The Ladybug	February 2, 2018	Its Cartoon Animation Studio	China
Ladybug & Cat Noir: The Movie	July 5, 2023	ZAG Inc. Method Animation; ON Animation Studios; The Awakening Production	France
Land of the Child أرض الطف (Ard Al Taaf) أرض الطف	January 19, 2007	Onyx Films; Sola Digital Arts	Lebanon
The Last Whale Singer	September 28, 2025	Telescope Animation	Germany; Czech Republic; Canada
Latte and the Magic Waterstone	December 25, 2019	Netflix; Dreamin' Dolphin Film GmbH; Eagle Eye Filmproduktion; Grid Animation; Umedia; Simonsays Pictures	Germany; Belgium
Laura's Star and the Dream Monsters; Lauras Stern und die Traummonster	October 13, 2011	Rothkirch Cartoon Film; Torus	Germany
Laura's Star and the Mysterious Dragon Nian; Lauras Stern und der geheimnisvolle Drache Nian	September 24, 2009	Rothkirch Cartoon Film; Torus	Germany
Leafie, A Hen into the Wild 마당을 나온 암탉	July 28, 2011	MK Pictures	South Korea
Legend of a Rabbit 兔侠传奇 (Tu Xia Chuan Qi)	July 11, 2011	Beijing Film Academy; Tianjin Film Studio	China
The Legend of Sasquatch	September 12, 2006	Gorilla Pictures	United States
The Legend of Sarila	February 22, 2013	10th Ave. Productions; CarpeDiem Film & TV	Canada
Legend of the Guardians: The Owls of Ga'Hoole	September 24, 2010	Village Roadshow Pictures; Animal Logic; GOG Productions	Australia; United States
Legends of Oz: Dorothy's Return	May 9, 2014	Prana Studios; Summertime Entertainment	United States
Legends of Valhalla: Thor; Hetjur Valhallar - Þór	October 14, 2011	CAOZ; Ulysses Filmproduktion; Magma Films	Iceland; Germany; Ireland
The Lego Batman Movie	February 10, 2017	Warner Animation Group; DC Entertainment; RatPac-Dune Entertainment; Lin Pictures; Lord Miller Productions; Vertigo Entertainment	United States; Australia; Denmark
The Lego Movie	February 7, 2014	Warner Animation Group; Village Roadshow Pictures; RatPac-Dune Entertainment; Lego System A/S; Lin Pictures; Animal Logic	United States; Australia; Denmark
The Lego Movie 2: The Second Part	February 8, 2019	Warner Animation Group; Lego System A/S; Rideback; Lord Miller Productions; Vertigo Entertainment; Animal Logic	United States; Australia; Denmark
The Lego Ninjago Movie	September 22, 2017	Warner Animation Group; RatPac-Dune Entertainment; Lego System A/S; Lin Pictures; Lord Miller Productions; Vertigo Entertainment; Animal Logic	United States; Australia; Denmark
Levity - Xero Error Minus1	April 10, 2010	Xpanse CGI	United Arab Emirates
Leo	November 21, 2023	Netflix Animation Studios; Happy Madison Productions	United States
Leo Da Vinci: Mission Mona Lisa	January 11, 2018	Gruppo Alcuni; Warsaw Movie Home	Italy; Poland
Lightyear	June 17, 2022	Pixar Animation Studios	United States
Little Bee; Abelhinhas	2009	Vídeo Brinquedo	Brazil
Little Bee Julia & Lady Life; L'Apetta Giulia e la signora Vita	September 19, 2003	Esse Ci Cinematografica; Kino Bez Granits	Italy
Little Brother, Big Trouble: A Christmas Adventure	October 12, 2012	Anima Vitae; Cinemaker; A. Film A/S; Ulysses; Magma Films	Finland; Denmark; Germany; Ireland; Estonia
Little Eggs: A Frozen Rescue; Huevitos congelados	December 14, 2022	Huevocartoon Producciones; Videocine; Televisa	Mexico
Little Eggs: An African Rescue; Un rescate de huevitos	August 12, 2021	Huevocartoon Producciones; Sky México; Cinergistic Films, Inc.	Mexico
The Little Engine That Could	March 22, 2011	Crest Animation Productions; Universal Animation Studios	United States
Little Heroes; Pequeños héroes	May 6, 2017	Orinoco Films; Fundación Villa del Cine	Venezuela
The Little Panda Fighter; Ursinho da Pesada	November 18, 2008	Vídeo Brinquedo	Brazil
The Little Prince	May 29, 2015	ON Animation Studios; Orange Studio; LPPTV; M6 Films; Lucky Red	France
The Little Vampire 3D; Der kleine Vampir	October 5, 2017	Storm Post Production; A. Film; Ambient Entertainment	Netherlands; Germany; Denmark
The Littlest Angel	2011	Cinepix Animation; Portsmouth Pictures; Anchor Bay	United States
Lino: An Adventure of Nine Lives; Lino: Uma Aventura de Sete Vidas	September 7, 2017	Start Desenhos Animados	Brazil
The Lion King	July 19, 2019	Walt Disney Pictures; Fairview Entertainment	United States
The Lion of Judah	June 3, 2011	Animated Family Films; Sunrise Productions; Character Matters Animation Studio	United States; South Africa
Lissi und der wilde Kaiser	October 25, 2007	Constantin Film; Herbx Film	Germany
The Living Forest; El bosque animado, sentirás su magia	August 3, 2001	Dygra Films; Megatrix	Spain
Livin' It Up With Bratz	August 4, 2006	Donovan Productions; Extra Large Technologies (XLT)	United States
The Lorax	March 2, 2012	Illumination	United States
Los balunis en la aventura del fin del mundo	March 24, 2004	Barton Films	Spain
The Lost Tiger	February 27, 2025	Maslow Entertainment; Like a Photon Creative	Australia
Luca	June 18, 2021	Pixar Animation Studios	United States
Luck	August 5, 2022	Apple TV+ Skydance Animation; Apple Studios	United States
Luis and the Aliens	May 24, 2018	Ulysses Films; Fabrique d'Images; A-Film APS	Germany; Luxembourg; Denmark
Luke and Lucy: The Texas Rangers; Suske en Wiske: De Texas-Rakkers	July 21, 2009	Skyline Entertainment; CoBo Fonds; AVRO; Studio Vandersteen; Standaard Uitgeverij; Cotoon Studio; Flanders Audiovisual Fund (VAF); LuxAnimation	Belgium; Netherlands; Luxembourg
Madagascar	May 27, 2005	DreamWorks Animation; PDI/DreamWorks	United States
Madagascar 3: Europe's Most Wanted	June 8, 2012	DreamWorks Animation; PDI/DreamWorks	United States
Madagascar: Escape 2 Africa	November 7, 2008	DreamWorks Animation; PDI/DreamWorks	United States
The Magic Crystal; Maaginen kristalli	November 18, 2011	Epidem ZOT; Aranéo Belgium; Skyline Animation	Finland; Belgium
The Magic Roundabout	February 2, 2005	Action Synthese; UK Film Council; Pathé Renn Productions; Pricel; France 2 Cinéma; Canal+ Les Films Action; SPZ Entertainment bolexbrothers limited	United Kingdom; France
The Magician's Elephant	March 17, 2023	Netflix Animation Studios; Pistor Productions	United States; Australia
Malice@Doll	April 27, 2001	GAGA Communications; Soeishinsha	Japan
Marmaduke	May 6, 2022	Netflix; One Cool Animation; Andrews McMeel Entertainment; Legacy Classics Family Entertainment; StoryBerry	United States; Canada; Hong Kong; South Korea
Mars Needs Moms	March 11, 2011	ImageMovers Digital	United States
Marvin the Martian in 3D	December 26, 1997	Warner Bros. Animation	United States
Masha and the Magic Nut; Наша Маша и волшебный орех (Nasha Masha i Volshebnyy orekh)	December 10, 2009	Amedia; Gala-Film	Russia
Mavka: The Forest Song	March 2, 2023	Animagrad Animation Studio; Film.UA Group	Ukraine
Maya the Bee	November 1, 2014	Flying Bark Productions; Screen Australia; Buzz Studios; Studio 100 Animation	Australia; Germany; Belgium
Maya the Bee: The Golden Orb	January 7, 2021	Flying Bark Productions; Studio 100 Animation	Australia
Maya the Bee: The Honey Games	July 26, 2018	Flying Bark Productions; Screen Australia; Buzz Studios; Studio 100 Animation	Australia; Germany
Mechamato Movie	December 8, 2022	Animonsta Studios; Astro Shaw	Malaysia
Meet the Robinsons	March 30, 2007	Walt Disney Animation Studios	United States
Mee Maakana The Movie	September 14, 2010	Cellmin Animation Studio	Maldives
Megamind	November 5, 2010	DreamWorks Animation; PDI/DreamWorks	United States
Megasónicos	1997	Baleuko S.L.	Spain
Mercano, the Martian; Mercano, el marciano	October 3, 2002		Argentina
Mickey's Twice Upon a Christmas	November 9, 2004	Disneytoon Studios	United States
Midsummer Dream; El Sueño de una noche de San Juan	July 1, 2005	Dygra Films	Spain
Migration	December 22, 2023	Illumination	United States
Minions	July 10, 2015	Illumination	United States
Minions & Monsters	July 1, 2026	Illumination	United States
Minions: The Rise of Gru	July 1, 2022	Illumination	United States
Minuscule: Valley of the Lost Ants; Minuscule: La Vallée des Fourmis Perdues	November 17, 2013	Entre Chien et Loup; Futurikon; Nozon; Vivi Film; Warner Chappel France	France; Belgium
Miss Moxy	June 6, 2025	BosBros; Phanta Animation; Eyeworks; AVROTROS	Netherlands; Belgium
The Missing Lynx; El lince perdido	December 25, 2008	Kandor Graphics; Perro Verde Films; Green Moon; YaYa! Films; Canal Sur Televisión; Televisión de Galicia (TVG) S.A. Etb (Euskal Telebista); Televisión Pública de Canarias; 7 Región de MurciaInstituto de Ciencias y Artes Cinematográficas del Ministerio de CulturaInstituto de Crédito Oficial (ICO); Consejería de Cultura y Medio Ambiente de la Junta de Andalucía; Cajasol	United Kingdom; Spain
Mission Kathmandu: The Adventures of Nelly & Simon; Nelly et Simon: Mission Yéti	October 5, 2017	Productions 10th Ave	Canada
The Mitchells vs. the Machines	April 30, 2021	Netflix; Sony Pictures Animation; Lord Miller Productions; One Cool Films	United States; Hong Kong
Mocland - The Legend of the Aloma; Misión en Mocland – Una Aventura Superespacial	November 7, 2008		Spain
Moana	November 23, 2016	Walt Disney Animation Studios	United States
Moana 2	November 27, 2024	Walt Disney Animation Studios	United States
Money, A Mythology of Darkness	November 17, 1998	Greek Film Centre; Horme Pictures; Oionos	Greece
The Monkey King	August 18, 2023	Netflix Animation Studios; Pearl Studio	United States; China; Hong Kong
Monster Family	August 24, 2017	Ambient Entertainment; GmbH; United Entertainment; Mack Media; Agir; Timeless Films; Rothkirch Cartoon Film; Sky Cinema Original Films; VideoBack	Germany; United Kingdom
Monster Family 2	October 15, 2021	Ambient Entertainment; Timeless Films; Rothkirch Cartoon Film; Sky Cinema Original Films	Germany; United Kingdom
Monster House	July 21, 2006	Sony Pictures Imageworks; Relativity Media; ImageMovers; Amblin Entertainment	United States
A Monster in Paris; Un monstre à Paris	October 12, 2011	EuropaCorp; Bibo Films; France 3 Cinéma; Walking the Dog; Umedia uFilm uFund; Canal+ France Télévisions; CinéCinéma; Le Tax Shelter du Gouvernement Fédéral de Belgique	France; Belgium
Monster Island; Isla Calaca	September 14, 2017	Ánima Estudios; Discreet Arts Productions	Mexico; Spain; India; United States; Bulgaria
Monsters University	June 21, 2013	Pixar Animation Studios	United States
Monsters vs. Aliens	March 27, 2009	DreamWorks Animation	United States
Monsters, Inc.	November 2, 2001	Pixar Animation Studios	United States
Moonbeam Bear and His Friends; Der Mondbär: Das große Kinoabenteuer	October 16, 2008		Germany
Mortadelo and Filemon: Mission Implausible	November 28, 2014	Ilion Animation Studios; Zeta Cinema; Películas Pendelton; Televisión Española; Canal+ Televisió de Catalunya; ONO	Spain
Mr. Peabody & Sherman	March 7, 2014	DreamWorks Animation; Pacific Data Images; Bullwinkle Studios	United States
Mug Travel 빼꼼의 머그잔 여행; Backkom-eui Mug-jan Yeo-haeng	March 22, 2007	RG Animation Studios; CJ-CGV	South Korea
Mummies	February 24, 2023	Atresmedia Cine; 4 Cats Pictures; Anangu Grup; Moomios Movie AIE	Spain
Mummy, I'm a Zombie; Mamá, soy una zombi	September 21, 2014	Abra Producciones	Spain
Mune: Guardian of the Moon; Mune, le gardien de la lune	October 14, 2015	On Animation Studios; Onyx Films; Kinology; Orange Studio	France
A Mushsnail Tale	2003	Cawthon Entertainment	United States
My Little Pony: A New Generation	September 24, 2021	Netflix; Entertainment One; Boulder Media	United States
Nak	April 3, 2008	beboydcg	Thailand
Ne Zha	November 7, 2019	Chengdu Coco Cartoon; Beijing Enlight Pictures	China
Ne Zha 2	January 29, 2025	Chengdu Coco Cartoon; Beijing Enlight Media; Beijing Enlight Pictures; Chengdu Zizai Jingjie Culture Media; Beijing Coloroom Technology	China
Next Gen	September 7, 2018	Netflix; Baozou Manhua; Alibaba Pictures; Tangent Animation	United States; Canada; China
Night of the Zoopocalypse	March 7, 2025	Copperheart Entertainment; Anton Capital Entertainment; Charades; UMedia; Mac Guff; IDL Films; House of Cool	Canada; France; Belgium
Nimona	June 30, 2023	Netflix; Annapurna Animation; Vertigo Entertainment	United States
Norm of the North	January 15, 2016	Splash Entertainment; Assemblage Entertainment; Telegael	United States; Ireland
The Nut Job	January 17, 2014	RedRover; ToonBox Entertainment; Gulfstream Pictures	Canada; South Korea; United States
The Nut Job 2: Nutty by Nature	August 11, 2017	Open Road Films; ToonBox Entertainment; Gulfstream Pictures; Red Rover International; Shanghai Hoongman	Canada; South Korea; United States
Oblivion Island: Haruka and the Magic Mirror ホッタラケの島 遥と魔法の鏡	August 22, 2009	Fuji Television; Production I.G	Japan
Olentzero and the Magic Log; Olentzero y el tronco mágico	November 25, 2005	Baleuko S.L.	Spain
Olsen Gang Gets Polished; Olsen-banden på de bonede gulve	October 14, 2010	Nordisk Film	Denmark
Onward	March 6, 2020	Pixar Animation Studios	United States
Ooops! Noah is Gone...	April 9, 2015	Ulysses Filmproduktion; Fabrique D'Images; Skyline Entertainment; Moetion Films; Studio Rakete; The Picture Factory; Grid Animation	Belgium; Germany; Ireland; Luxembourg
Open Season	September 29, 2006	Sony Pictures Animation	United States
Open Season 2	January 27, 2009	Sony Pictures Animation; Reel FX Entertainment	United States
Open Season 3	January 25, 2011	Sony Pictures Animation; Reel FX Entertainment	United States
Open Season: Scared Silly	March 8, 2016	Sony Pictures Animation	United States
Opera Imaginaire; Opéra imaginaire (Imaginary Opera)	March 12, 1993	Pascavision; Club d'Investissement Média (in association with); F3 (in association with); Institut National de l'Audiovisuel (INA) (in association with); Aniway (camera) (segment "Noi siamo zingarelle"); Ex Machina (computer graphics) (segments "Lakmé", "Carmen" and introduction sequences); Cel Out Films (trace and paint) (segment "Le Veau d'Or"); Institut National de l'Audiovisuel (INA) (computer graphics) (segment "Du also bist mein Braütigam?"); Colour Crew (coloring) (segment "Cendrillon"); Mike Hibbert Animation (xerox) (segment "Pêcheurs de perles"); Cosgrove Hall Films (production services) (segment "Pêcheurs de perles"); Framestore (production services) (segment "Madame Butterfly"); Nederlands Fonds voor de Film (financial support) (segment "La donna è mobile"); Co-Productiefonds Binnenlandse Omroep (financial support) (segment "La donna è mobile"); Bareboards Productions (production services) (segment "Vesti la Giubba"); The Foundation for Sport and the Arts (financial support) (segment "Vesti la Giubba")	France
Orla Frosnapper; Orla Frosnapper	June 1, 2011	Crone Film Produktion A/S	Denmark
Orion and the Dark	February 2, 2024	Netflix; DreamWorks Animation	United States
Our Masha and Magical Nut; Наша Маша и волшебный орех	December 10, 2009	Amedia Films; Gala Film	Russia
Over the Hedge	May 19, 2006	DreamWorks Animation	United States
Over the Moon	October 23, 2020	Netflix Animation Studios; Pearl Studio; Glen Keane Productions	United States; China
Ozzy	October 14, 2016	Arcadia Motion Pictures; Tangent Animation	Spain; Canada
Panda vs. Aliens	April 9, 2021	Arcana Studio	Canada; China
Pandavas: The Five Warriors	December 23, 2000	Pentamedia Graphics	India
Paw Patrol: The Dino Movie	August 14, 2026	Spin Master Entertainment	Canada
Paw Patrol: The Mighty Movie	September 23, 2023	Nickelodeon Movies; Spin Master Entertainment	Canada
Paw Patrol: The Movie	August 20, 2021	Nickelodeon Movies; Spin Master Entertainment	Canada
Paws of Fury: The Legend of Hank	July 15, 2022	Flying Tigers Entertainment; Align; GFM Animation; HB Wink Animation; Aniventure; Cinesite	United Kingdom; United States; China
The Peanuts Movie	November 6, 2015	Blue Sky Studios	United States
Penguins of Madagascar	November 26, 2014	DreamWorks Animation; Pacific Data Images	United States
Pets United	November 8, 2019	Joyhil Media and Culture; Screencraft Entertainment; Timeless Films; Eurosino Entertainment GmbH; China Film Group; Fish Blowing Bubbles; PlayArte Pictures	Germany; China; United Kingdom
Petualangan Si Adi	October 24, 2013	Batavia Pictures	Indonesia
Piccolo, Saxo and Company; Piccolo, Saxo et Compagnie aka. Piccolo, Saxo et cie	December 20, 2006	Millimages, Haut et Court	France
Piece by Piece	October 11, 2024	Universal Animation Studios; I Am Other; Tremolo Productions	United States
Pil	August 11, 2021	TAT Productions; SND Groupe M6	France
Pinocchio 3000	February 9, 2004	CinéGroupe; AnimaKids Productions; Filmax Animation; Castelao Productions, S.A; Bren Entertainment, S.A; Canal+ France 2 Cinéma	Spain; France; Canada
The Pirate Fairy	April 1, 2014	Disneytoon Studios	United States
Pirates in Callao; Piratas en el Callao aka. Piratas en el Pacifico	February 24, 2005	AlpaMayo Ent.	Peru
The Pirates Who Don't Do Anything: A VeggieTales Movie	January 11, 2008	Big Idea Productions; Starz Animation; Entertainment Rights; Veggie Pirates Productions	United States
Plan Bee	2007	Spark Plug Entertainment	United States
Planes	August 9, 2013	Disneytoon Studios	United States
Planes: Fire & Rescue	July 18, 2014	Disneytoon Studios	United States
Planet 51	November 20, 2009	Ilion Animation Studios; HandMade Films International	Spain; United Kingdom; United States
Plankton: The Movie	March 7, 2025	Netflix; Nickelodeon Movies	United States
Planzet	May 22, 2010	CoMix Wave	Japan
Playmobil: The Movie	August 16, 2019	DMG Entertainment; Morgen Studios; ON Animation Studios; Little Dragon; 2.9 Film Holding Ltd. Wild Bunch	France; United Kingdom; United States; Germany
Ploddy the Police Car Makes a Splash	January 8, 2010	Neofilm AS; Qvisten Animation	Norway
Plumíferos	February 18, 2010	CS Entertainment; Manos Digitales Animation Studio; 100 Bares Producciones; Telefe	Argentina
The Polar Express	November 10, 2004	Castle Rock Entertainment; Shangri-La Entertainment; Playtone; ImageMovers; Golden Mean Productions	United States
The Pout-Pout Fish	January 1, 2026	MIMO Studios; Like a Photon Creative; Cosmic Dino Studio; Alceon Entertainment; Eclectik Vision	Australia; United States
Pororo, The Racing Adventure	January 23, 2013	Ocon Studios	South Korea
Postman Pat: The Movie	May 23, 2014	Classic Media; RGH Pictures; Timeless Films	United Kingdom; United States
Pokémon: Mewtwo Strikes Back – Evolution	April 7, 2019	OLM, Inc.	Japan
The Prince and the Pauper: Double Trouble	2007	BKN International	United States
The Princess and the Dragon; Принцесса и Дракон	August 23, 2018	Licensing Brands	Russia
The Prodigies	May 2011	Onyx Films; Studio 37; Fidelite Films; DQ Entertainment; LuxAnimation	France; Belgium; Luxembourg
The Prodigy	July 7, 2009	Prevalent Entertainment	United States
Puss in Boots	October 28, 2011	DreamWorks Animation	United States
Puss in Boots: The Last Wish	December 21, 2022	DreamWorks Animation	United States
Quackerz; Крякнутые каникулы	February 18, 2016	Asymmetric VFX Studio; ROME Animation & Film Studio	Russia
Quantum Quest: A Cassini Space Odyssey	January 22, 2011	DigiMax Animation; Juipter 9 Productions	United States
The Queen's Corgi	January 16, 2019	nWave Pictures; Belga Productions; Lionsgate UK	Belgium; United Kingdom
Rabbit School: Guardians of the Golden Egg; Die Häschenscule – Jagd nach dem Goldenen Ei	March 16, 2017	Akkord Film Produktion GmbH	Germany
Raggie; Sipsik	February 19, 2020	A. Film Production; Copenhagen Bombay	Estonia; Denmark
Rally Road Racers	May 12, 2023	Virtuso Productions; Riverstone Pictures; LipSync; Vanguard Animation; Kintop Pictures; REP Productions 6 Ltd.	United Arab Emirates; United Kingdom; United States
Ralph Breaks the Internet	November 21, 2018	Walt Disney Animation Studios	United States
Rango	March 4, 2011	Nickelodeon Movies; Industrial Light & Magic	United States
Ratatoing	June 26, 2007	Video Brinquedo	United States
Ratatouille	June 29, 2007	Pixar Animation Studios	United States
Ratchet & Clank	April 29, 2016	Rainmaker Entertainment; Blockade Entertainment; PlayStation Originals; CNHK Media China; Film Financial Services; Original Force; Insomniac Games	China; Hong Kong; Canada; United States
Raya and the Last Dragon	March 5, 2021	Walt Disney Animation Studios	United States
ReBoot: Daemon Rising	November 18, 2001	AAC Kids; Mainframe Entertainment	Canada
ReBoot: My Two Bobs	November 25, 2001	AAC Kids; Mainframe Entertainment	Canada
The Reef 2: High Tide	October 30, 2012	WonderWorld Studios	South Korea; United States
Renaissance	March 15, 2006	Onyx Films; Millimages	France; United Kingdom; Luxembourg
Rescue Heroes: The Movie	November 18, 2003		Canada
Resident Evil: Damnation	October 27, 2012	Digital Frontier	Japan
Resident Evil: Degeneration	February 4, 2009	Digital Frontier; Capcom	Japan
Resident Evil: Vendetta	May 27, 2017	Marza Animation Planet	Japan
Return to Mushsnail: The Legend of the Snowmill	2003	Cawthon Entertainment	United States
Richard the Stork; Überflieger – Kleine Vögel, großes Geklapper	February 12, 2017	Knudsen & Streuber Medienmanufaktur; Ulysses Filmproduktion; Melusine Productions; Den Siste Skilling; Walking The Dog	Belgium; Germany; Luxembourg; Norway
Richard the Stork and the Mystery of the Great Jewel	March 23, 2023	Den Siste Skilling; Knudsen & Streuber Medienmanufaktur; Walking The Dog	Germany; Belgium; Norway
Rio	April 15, 2011	Blue Sky Studios	United States
Rio 2	April 11, 2014	Blue Sky Studios	United States
Rise of the Guardians	November 2, 2012	DreamWorks Animation	United States
Riverdance: The Animated Adventure	May 28, 2021	Cinesite; River Productions; Aniventure	Ireland; United Kingdom
Roadside Romeo	October 24, 2008	Yash Raj Films; Walt Disney Pictures India	India
Robin Hood: Quest For The King	February 22, 2007	BKN International	Germany
Robots	March 11, 2005	Blue Sky Studios	United States
Rock Dog	February 24, 2017	Summit Premiere; H. Brothers; Mandoo Pictures; H. Brothers Entertainment; Eracme Entertainment; Dream Factory Group; Reel FX Animation Studios	United States; China
Rock Dog 2: Rock Around the Park	June 11, 2021	Lionsgate; Splash Entertainment; HB Wink Animation	United States; China
Rock Dog 3: Battle the Beat	January 24, 2023	Lionsgate; Splash Entertainment; HB Wink Animation	United States; China
Rolie Polie Olie: The Baby Bot Chase	June 3, 2003	Nelvana; Sparx*	Canada; United States
Rolie Polie Olie: The Great Defender of Fun	August 12, 2002	Nelvana; Sparx*	Canada; France
Ron's Gone Wrong	October 15, 2021 (United Kingdom); October 22, 2021 (United States)	Locksmith Animation; 20th Century Animation	United Kingdom; United States
Ronal the Barbarian	September 29, 2011	Einstein Film	Denmark
A Rooster With Many Eggs; Un Gallo Con Muchos Huevos	August 20, 2015	Huevocartoon Producciones; Simka Entertainment	Mexico
RPG: Metanoia	December 25, 2010	Star Cinema; Ambient Media; Thaumatrope Animation Production	Philippines
Ruby Gillman, Teenage Kraken	June 30, 2023	DreamWorks Animation	United States
Rudolf the Black Cat	August 6, 2016	Sprite Animation Studios	Japan
Rumble	December 15, 2021	Paramount Animation; WWE Studios; Walden Media; Reel FX Creative Studios	United States
Rudolph the Red-Nosed Reindeer and the Island of Misfit Toys	October 30, 2001	Golden Books Family Entertainment; Tundra Productions; GoodTimes Entertainment	Canada
Rufus: The Sea Serpent Who Couldn't Swim; Ruffen: Sjøormen som ikke kunne svømme	October 10, 2025	Maipo Film; Anima Vitae; Atmosphere Media	Norway
S.O.S. Planet	November 2002		United States; Belgium
Sadko; Садко	March 24, 2018	Melnitsa Animation Studio; InlayFilm	Russia
Sahara	May 12, 2017	Netflix; StudioCanal; La Station Animation; Mandarin Production; Transfilm International	France; Canada
Saint Seiya: Legend of Sanctuary; Seinto Seiya Rejendo Obu Sankuchuari	June 21, 2014	Toei Animation	Japan
The Santa Claus Brothers	December 13, 2001	Nelvana; Sitting Ducks Productions; Film Roman	Canada; United States
Santa vs. the Snowman 3D	December 12, 1997	O Entertainment; DNA Productions	United States
Sausage Party	August 12, 2016	Annapurna Pictures; Point Grey Pictures	United States; Canada
Saving Santa	November 11, 2013	Gateway Films; Prana Studios	United Kingdom; United States; India
Scary Godmother: Halloween Spooktakular	July 18, 2003	Mainframe Entertainment	Canada
Scoob!	May 15, 2020	Warner Animation Group; Atlas Entertainment; 1492 Pictures	United States
Scrooge: A Christmas Carol	December 2, 2022	Netflix; Timeless Films; Axis Studios	United Kingdom; United States
The Sea Beast	June 24, 2022	Netflix Animation Studios	Canada; United States
Seal Team	December 31, 2021	Netflix; Triggerfish Animation Studios	South Africa
Secret of the Wings	October 23, 2012	Disneytoon Studios	United States
The Secret Princess	February 14, 2016	Transtales Entertainment	Nigeria
The Secret Life of Pets	July 8, 2016	Illumination	United States
The Secret Life of Pets 2	June 7, 2019	Illumination	United States
Secret Magic Control Agency	March 18, 2021	Netflix; Wizart Animation; CTB Film Company; QED International	Russia
Secret Magic Control Agency II: Mission Sleeping Beauty	May 22, 2025	Voronezh Animation Studio; CTB Film Company; Magic Frame Animation (England/Cyprus); QED International; Creation Entertainment Media	Russia
SeeFood	October 7, 2011	Silver Ant	Malaysia; China
Seer	July 28, 2011		China
Seer 2	June 28, 2012	Mr.Cartoon Pictures Shanghai Taomee Network Technology Ltd. EE-Media; Hunan Aniworld Satellite TV; 37 Entertainment; China Film Co., Ltd.	China
Seer the Movie 3: Heroes Alliance	July 12, 2013	Shanghai Taomee Animation Limited; Enlight Pictures	China
Seer 4	July 10, 2014		China
Seer 5: Rise of Thunder	July 23, 2015	hanghai Taomi Animation; Beijing Enlight Media; Beijing Iqiyi; Beijing KAKU Cartoon Satellite TV	China
The Seventh Dwarf	September 25, 2014	Zipfelmützen GmbH & Co. KG	Germany
Sgt. Stubby: An American Hero	April 13, 2018	Fun Academy Media Group; Mikros Image	United States; Ireland; Canada; France; United Kingdom
Shark Bait	July 7, 2006	Wonderworld Studios; DigiArt; FXDigital	South Korea; United States
Shark Tale	October 1, 2004	DreamWorks Animation	United States
Sheep and Wolves	April 28, 2016	Wizart Animation; CTB Film Company	Russia
Sheep and Wolves 2: Pig Deal	January 24, 2019	Wizart Animation; CTB Film Company	Russia
Shenmue: The Movie	January 20, 2001		Japan
Sherlock Gnomes	March 23, 2018	Paramount Animation; Metro-Goldwyn-Mayer Pictures; Rocket Pictures	United States; United Kingdom
Shrek	May 18, 2001	DreamWorks Animation; PDI/DreamWorks	United States
Shrek 2	May 19, 2004	DreamWorks Animation; PDI/DreamWorks	United States
Shrek Forever After	May 21, 2010	DreamWorks Animation	United States
Shrek the Third	May 18, 2007	DreamWorks Animation; PDI/DreamWorks	United States
Sid the Science Kid: The Movie	April 2, 2013	The Jim Henson Company; Nine Eyes Stone Pictures; Shanghai Animation Film Studio	United States; China
Sinbad: Beyond the Veil of Mists	February 18, 2000	Improvision Corporation; Pentafour Software	India; United States
Sing	December 21, 2016	Illumination	United States
Sing 2	December 22, 2021	Illumination	United States
The Sloth Lane	July 25, 2024	Like a Photon Creative; Screen Queensland Studios; Cosmic Dino Studio; Maslow Entertainment	Australia
Smallfoot	September 28, 2018	Warner Animation Group; Zaftig Films	United States
Smurfs: The Lost Village	April 7, 2017	Sony Pictures Animation; The Kerner Entertainment Company	United States
Sneaks	March 28, 2025	Ashland Hill Media Finance; GFM Animation; Rabbits Black; RTG Features; Waffle Iron Entertainment; Assemblage Entertainment; Cinema Gypsy Productions; Lengi Studios	United States; United Kingdom; India; Canada
The Snow Queen	December 31, 2012	Wizart Animation; InlayFilm; Bazelevs Company	Russia
The Snow Queen 2: The Snow King	December 12, 2014	Wizart Animation; Bazelevs Company	Russia
The Snow Queen 3: Fire and Ice	December 29, 2016	Wizart Animation; 3Beep	Russia
The Snow Queen 4: Mirrorlands	December 21, 2018	Wizart Animation	Russia
The Snow Queen and the Princess	February 16, 2023	Wizart Animation	Russia
Snowtime! La Bataille géante de boules de neige	November 13, 2015	CarpeDiem Film & TV	Canada
The Soccer Football Movie	November 9, 2022	Netflix; Splash Entertainment	United States
Son of Aladdin	August 29, 2003	Pentamedia Graphics	India
The Son of Bigfoot	August 11, 2017	nWave Pictures; Belga Productions; Illuminata Pictures	Belgium; France
Soul	December 25, 2020	Pixar Animation Studios	United States
Space Chimps	July 18, 2008	Starz Animation; Vanguard Animation	United States; United Kingdom; Canada
Space Chimps 2: Zartog Strikes Back	October 5, 2010	Vanguard Animation	United States
Space Dogs	March 18, 2010	KinoAtis; Centre of National Film	Russia
Space Dogs 2 Белка и Стрелка. Лунные Приключения	February 6, 2014	KinoAtis	Russia
Space Dogs: Return to Earth	September 24, 2020	KinoAtis; Gorky Film Studio	Russia
Space Pirate Captain Harlock	September 7, 2013	Toei Animation; Marza Animation Planet	Japan
Spark	April 14, 2017	Red Rover; ToonBox Entertainment; Hoongman Technology; Gulfstream Pictures; Suning Universal Media	Canada; South Korea; United States; China
Spider-Man: Across the Spider-Verse	June 2, 2023	Marvel Entertainment; Sony Pictures Animation; Pascal Pictures; Arad Productions; Lord Miller Productions	United States
Spider-Man: Into the Spider-Verse	December 14, 2018	Marvel Entertainment; Sony Pictures Animation; Pascal Pictures; Arad Productions; Lord Miller Productions	United States
Spies in Disguise	December 25, 2019	Blue Sky Studios; Chernin Entertainment	United States
Spirit of the Forest; Espíritu del Bosque	September 12, 2008	Dygra Films	Spain
Spirit Untamed	June 4, 2021	DreamWorks Animation	United States
The SpongeBob Movie: Search for SquarePants	December 19, 2025	Paramount Animation; Nickelodeon Movies	United States
The SpongeBob Movie: Sponge on the Run	August 14, 2020	Paramount Animation; Nickelodeon Movies; United Plankton Pictures; MRC	United States
The SpongeBob Movie: Sponge Out of Water	February 6, 2015	Paramount Animation; Nickelodeon Movies; United Plankton Pictures	United States
Spookley the Square Pumpkin	October 19, 2004	Kidtoon Films; Lionsgate; Holiday Hill Farms	Canada
Spellbound	November 22, 2024	Netflix; Skydance Animation	United States; Spain
Spycies	January 11, 2020	iQIYI Motion Pictures; Lux Populi Production; Lux Populi VFX; Tianrui Pai Ming culture media co, LTD; Beijing Chase Film; Jungler	China; France
Stand By Me Doraemon; STAND BY ME ドラえもん	August 8, 2014	Shirogumi; Robot Communications; Shin-Ei Animation	Japan
Starship Troopers: Invasion	July 21, 2012	Sola Digital Arts	United States; Japan
Starship Troopers: Traitor of Mars	August 21, 2017	Sola Digital Arts; Stage 6 Films	United States; Japan
The Star	November 3, 2017	Sony Pictures Animation; Walden Media; Affirm Films; The Jim Henson Company; Franklin Entertainment	United States
Star Wars: The Clone Wars	August 15, 2008	Lucasfilm Ltd. Lucasfilm Animation	United States
StarDog and TurboCat	December 6, 2019	Head Gear Films; Screen Yorkshire; Particular Crowd; Red Star 3D	United Kingdom
The Stolen Princess	March 7, 2018	Animagrad Animation Studio; FILM.UA Group	Ukraine
Storks	September 23, 2016	Warner Animation Group; RatPac-Dune Entertainment; Stoller Global Solutions	United States
Strange Magic	January 23, 2015	Lucasfilm Animation; Industrial Light & Magic	United States
Strange World	November 23, 2022	Walt Disney Animation Studios	United States
Strawberry Shortcake: The Sweet Dreams Movie	September 4, 2006	DIC Entertainment; American Greetings	United States
Sunshine Barry & the Disco Worms; Disco Ormene	September 7, 2008	Crone Film; Radar Film	Denmark; Germany
The Super Mario Bros. Movie	April 5, 2023	Illumination; Nintendo	United States
The Super Mario Galaxy Movie	April 1, 2026	Illumination; Nintendo	United States
Supertramps	December 1, 2004		Spain
Surf's Up	June 8, 2007	Sony Pictures Animation	United States
Surf's Up 2: WaveMania	January 17, 2017	Sony Pictures Animation; WWE Studios	United States
Swapped	May 1, 2026	Netflix; Skydance Animation	United States
The Swan Princess: A Royal Family Tale	February 25, 2014	Crest Animation Productions; Nest Family Entertainment	United States
The Swan Princess: A Royal Myztery	March 27, 2018	Sony Pictures Home Entertainment; Crest Animation Productions	United States
The Swan Princess: A Royal Wedding	August 4, 2020	Sony Pictures Home Entertainment; Crest Animation Productions	United States
The Swan Princess: Kingdom of Music	August 6, 2019	Sony Pictures Home Entertainment; Crest Animation Productions	United States
The Swan Princess Christmas	November 6, 2012	Nest Family Entertainment; StreetLight Animation Productions	United States
The Swan Princess: Princess Tomorrow, Pirate Today	September 6, 2016	Lionsgate; Crest Animation Productions	United States; India
The Swan Princess: Royally Undercover	March 28, 2017	Nest Family Entertainment; StreetLight Animation Productions	United States
Tad the Lost Explorer and the Secret of King Midas; Tadeo Jones 2: El secreto del Rey Midas	June 13, 2017	Lightbox Entertainment; Telecinco Cinema; Telefónica Studios	Spain
Tad, The Lost Explorer; Las aventuras de Tadeo Jones	June 4, 2012	El Toro Pictures; Lightbox Entertainment; Ikiru Films; Telefónica Studios; Media Networks	Spain
Tad, the Lost Explorer and the Emerald Tablet; Tadeo Jones 3. La tabla esmeralda	August 26, 2022	Telecinco Cinema; Lightbox Animation Studios; Ikiru Films; Anangu Grup; La Tadeopelícula AIE	Spain
The Tale of Despereaux	December 19, 2008	Relativity Media; Larger Than Life Productions; Framestore Animation	United States
Tales of the Night	July 20, 2011	Nord-Ouest Films; Studio O StudioCanal	France
Tall Tales from the Magical Garden of Antoon Krings; Drôles de petites bêtes	December 13, 2017	Onyx Films; Bidibul Productions	France; Luxembourg
Tangled	November 24, 2010	Walt Disney Animation Studios	United States
Tarzan	October 17, 2013	Constantin Film; Ambient Entertainment	Germany
Tea Pets	May 20, 2017	Light Chaser Animation Studios	China
Teenage Mutant Ninja Turtles: Mutant Mayhem	August 2, 2023	Nickelodeon Movies; Point Grey Pictures	United States
Tekken: Blood Vengeance	July 26, 2011	Digital Frontier	Japan
Terkel in Trouble; Terkel i knibe	April 2, 2004	A. Film Production	Denmark
That Christmas	December 4, 2024	Netflix; Locksmith Animation	United Kingdom
Thelma the Unicorn	May 17, 2024	Netflix Animation Studios; Scholastic Entertainment	United States
The Thief of Dreams; El Ladrón de sueños	December 15, 2000	Dibulitoon Studio, S.L.	Spain
Thomas & Friends: Journey Beyond Sodor	June 23, 2017	HIT Entertainment	United Kingdom
The Three Musketeers: Saving the Crown	2007	BKN International	United States
Throne of Elves	August 19, 2016	Shanghai Mijia Media; Horgos Caitiaowu Pictures; Beijing Enlight Pictures; HG Entertainment; Hu Na Kuai Le Yang Guang Hu Dong Yu Le Media 江苏省广播电视集团有限公司; 58.com Bilibili Film; Mili Entertainment	China
Thru the Moebius Strip	December 30, 2005	BloodWorks; GDC Productions	China
The Tiger's Apprentice	February 2, 2024	Paramount Animation; Jane Startz Productions	United States
Tinker Bell	October 28, 2008	Disneytoon Studios	United States
Tinker Bell and the Great Fairy Rescue	September 21, 2010	Walt Disney Pictures; Disneytoon Studios	United States
Tinker Bell and the Legend of the NeverBeast	January 30, 2015	Disneytoon Studios	United States
Tinker Bell and the Lost Treasure	October 27, 2009	Disneytoon Studios	United States
Tiny Robots; Robozinhos	2008	Vídeo Brinquedo	Brazil
TMNT	March 23, 2007	Imagi Animation Studios	United States; Hong Kong
Tofu	July 28, 2017	Kingkey Animation Studios	China
Tonka Tough Truck Adventures: The Biggest Show on Wheels	September 28, 2004		United States
Tony Hawk in Boom Boom Sabotage	September 12, 2004	Mainframe Entertainment	United States
Top Cat Begins	October 30, 2015	Ánima Estudios; Discreet Arts Productions; Prana Studios	India; Mexico; United States
Top Cat: The Movie	September 16, 2011	Ánima Estudios; Illusion Studios	Mexico; Argentina
Toy Story	November 22, 1995	Pixar Animation Studios	United States
Toy Story 2	November 24, 1999	Pixar Animation Studios	United States
Toy Story 3	June 18, 2010	Pixar Animation Studios	United States
Toy Story 4	June 21, 2019	Pixar Animation Studios	United States
Toy Story 5	June 19, 2026	Pixar Animation Studios	United States
Transformers One	September 20, 2024	Paramount Animation; Hasbro Entertainment; New Republic Pictures; Di Bonaventura Pictures; Bayhem Films	United States
Tripping the Rift: The Movie	March 25, 2008	Anchor Bay Entertainment	Canada
Tristan & Isolde; Tristan et Iseut	April 3, 2002		France; Luxembourg
Trolls	November 4, 2016	DreamWorks Animation	United States
Trolls Band Together	November 17, 2023	DreamWorks Animation	United States
Trolls World Tour	April 10, 2020	DreamWorks Animation	United States
The True Story of Puss'N Boots; La Véritable Histoire du chat botté	April 1, 2009	Herold and Family; MK2 Productions; France 3 Cinéma	France; Belgium; Switzerland
Turbo	July 17, 2013	DreamWorks Animation	United States
Turning Red	March 11, 2022	Pixar Animation Studios	United States
A Turtle's Tale: Sammy's Adventures	August 4, 2010	StudioCanal nWave Pictures; Illuminata Pictures	Belgium; France
A Turtle's Tale 2: Sammy's Escape from Paradise	August 15, 2012	nWave Pictures; Illuminata Pictures; Motion Investment Group; BNP Paribas Fortis Film Fund; Le Tax Shelter du Gouvernement Fédéral de Belgique uFilm	Belgium; France; Italy
Turu, the Wacky Hen	September 7, 2020	Argentina Sono Film S.A.C.I. Brown Films AIE; Gloriamundi Producciones; In Post We Trust; Instituto Nacional de Cine y Artes Audiovisuales (INCAA); Mediabyte; Pampa Films; Produccions A Fonsagrada; Tandem Films	Spain; Argentina
The Twits	October 17, 2025	Netflix Animation Studios; The Roald Dahl Story Company; Jellyfish Pictures	United Kingdom; United States
The Ugly Duckling and Me! Den grimme ælling og mig	September 10, 2006	A. Film A/S; Magma Films; TV2 Denmark; Futurikon	Denmark; Ireland; Germany; France
UglyDolls	May 3, 2019	STX Family; Reel FX Animation Studios; Alibaba Pictures; Original Force; Troublemaker Studios	United States; Canada; China
Ultraman: Rising	June 14, 2024	Netflix Animation Studios; Tsuburaya Productions	United States; Japan
Ultramarines: A Warhammer 40,000 Movie	December 13, 2010	Good Story Productions; Codex Pictures; POP6	United Kingdom
Under the Boardwalk	October 27, 2023	Paramount Animation; Big Kid Pictures	United States
Unstable Fables: 3 Pigs & a Baby	March 4, 2008	The Jim Henson Company; Prana Animation Studios; Flame Ventures; The Weinstein Company	United States
Unstable Fables: Goldilocks and the 3 Bears Show	December 16, 2008	The Jim Henson Company; Prana Animation Studios; Flame Ventures; The Weinstein Company	United States
Unstable Fables: Tortoise vs. Hare	September 9, 2008	The Jim Henson Company; Prana Animation Studios; Flame Ventures; The Weinstein Company	United States
Up	May 29, 2009	Pixar Animation Studios	United States
Upin & Ipin: The Lone Gibbon Kris; Upin & Ipin: Keris Siamang Tunggal	March 21, 2019	Les' Copaque Production	Malaysia
Uzay Kuvvetleri 2911	May 16, 2014	Animaj Film	Turkey
Valiant	March 25, 2005	Vanguard Animation	United Kingdom; United States
A Very Wompkee Christmas	November 2003	Deos Animation; MarVista Entertainment; Wompkees	United States
Vexille; Bekushiru 2077 Nihon sakoku	August 18, 2007	Oxybot	Japan
Visitor	November 7, 1998	GAGA Pictures avex JIC; WOWOW; Amuse Soft Entertainment, Inc.	Japan
Vivo	August 6, 2021	Netflix; Sony Pictures Animation; One Cool Films; Laurence Mark Productions	United States
WALL-E	June 27, 2008	Pixar Animation Studios	United States
A Warrior's Tail; Савва. Сердце воина	November 12, 2015	Art Pictures Studio; Glukoza Production	Russia
We Are the Strange	January 19, 2007		United States
Where the Dead Go to Die	February 21, 2012		United States
When Black Birds Fly	November 13, 2015		United States
White Snake 白蛇：缘起	January 11, 2019	Light Chaser Animation Studios	China
Wicked Flying Monkeys; Guardianes de Oz	April 10, 2015	Ánima Estudios; FilmSharks International	Mexico; India
The Wild	April 14, 2006	Walt Disney Pictures; Hoytyboy Pictures; Sir Zip Studios; Contrafilm; C.O.R.E. Feature Animation; Nigel Productions	United States
The Wild Life; Robinson Crusoe	March 30, 2016	StudioCanal nWave Pictures; Illuminata Pictures	Belgium; France
The Wild Robot	September 27, 2024	DreamWorks Animation	United States
The Willoughbys	April 22, 2020	Netflix Animation Studios; Bron Studios; Creative Wealth Media	Canada; United States
Wings; От винта 3D	August 19, 2012	Paradiz Prodakshnz; Touch FX Animation Studio	Russia; Armenia
Winx Club 3D: Magical Adventure; Winx Club 3D: Magica Avventura	October 29, 2010	Rainbow CGI Animation Studio	Italy
Winx Club: The Mystery of the Abyss; Winx Club - Il mistero degli abissi	September 4, 2014	Rainbow S.p.A.	Italy
Winx Club: The Secret of the Lost Kingdom; Winx Club - Il Segreto Del Regno Perduto	November 30, 2007	Rainbow S.p.A. Rai Fiction	Italy
Wish	November 22, 2023	Walt Disney Animation Studios	United States
Wish Dragon	January 15, 2021	Netflix; Sony Pictures Animation; Beijing Sparkle Roll Media Corporation; Tencent Pictures; Base Media	United States; China
The Wishmas Tree	February 27, 2020	Like a Photon Creative	Australia
Wonderful Days	July 17, 2003	Endgame Productions Inc. Masquerade Films; Maxmedia; Tin House Productions	South Korea
Wonder Park	March 15, 2019	Paramount Animation; Nickelodeon Movies; Ilion Animation Studios	United States
Wreck-It Ralph	November 2, 2012	Walt Disney Animation Studios	United States
Xevious	August 10, 2002	Groove Corporation	Japan
Yak: The Giant King	October 4, 2012	Workpoint Picture	Thailand
Yellowbird; Gus, petit oiseau, grand voyage	February 4, 2015	TeamTO; Haut et Court; SC Films International	France; Belgium
Yona Yona Penguin	December 23, 2009	Madhouse; Dynamo Pictures; Def2shoot; Storm Lion; Denis Friedman Productions	France; Japan; United States
Yugly	October 14, 2026	nWave Studios; Octopolis	France; Belgium
Yugo & Lala	August 10, 2012		China
Zodiac: The Race Begins	January 26, 2006	Shaw Organisation	Singapore
Zombillenium	May 24, 2017	Maybe Movies; Belvision; Dupuis Edition & Audiovisuel; Universal Pictures International France; Gebaka Films; Pipangaï; 2 Minutes; France 3 Cinema	France; Belgium
Zootopia	March 4, 2016	Walt Disney Animation Studios	United States
Zootopia 2	November 26, 2025	Walt Disney Animation Studios	United States

== Upcoming films ==
Film	Release date	Production company(s)	Country(s)
The Amazing Maurice 2: The Waters of Life	2027	Ulysses Filmproduktion; Studio Rakete; Cantilever Media; Narrativia; Sky; Moonshot Films; Red Star 3DMM; Squeeze Animation Studio	Germany; United Kingdom; United States; Canada
The Angry Birds Movie 3	December 23, 2026	Rovio Entertainment; Sega Sammy Group; Prime Focus	Finland; United States
Arvee Chronicles	TBA	Pop Family Entertainment; Toonz Media Group; Telegael	Australia; Ireland; India
Bad Fairies	May 21, 2027	Warner Bros. Pictures Animation; Legendary Entertainment; Locksmith Animation	United Kingdom; United States
The Bluey Movie	August 6, 2027	Ludo Studio; BBC Studios; Cosmic Dino Studio	Australia; United States
Buds	December 22, 2027	Sony Pictures Animation	United States
Century Goddess	TBA	Spire Animation Studios	United States
Charlie vs. the Chocolate Factory	2027	Netflix Animation Studios; The Roald Dahl Story Company	United States
Coco 2	November 21, 2029	Pixar Animation Studios	United States
CoComelon: The Movie	February 19, 2027	DreamWorks Animation; Moonbug Entertainment; Flywheel Media; Prime Focus Studios	United States; United Kingdom
Donkey	June 30, 2028	DreamWorks Animation	United States
Dougie Dolittle	2028	Studio 100; Caligari Film	Germany
Diya	TBA	Reel FX Creative Studios; Good Karma Productions	United States
Flamingo Flamenco	May 14, 2027	Studio 100; 3 Doubles Producciones	Spain; Germany; Ireland
Foo	TBA	Annapurna Animation	United States
Frozen 3	November 24, 2027	Walt Disney Animation Studios	United States
Frozen 4	TBA	Walt Disney Animation Studios	United States
Funko	TBA	Warner Bros. Pictures Animation	United States
The Garfield Movie 2	TBA	Alcon Entertainment; DNEG Animation	United States
Gatto	March 5, 2027	Pixar Animation Studios	United States
Ghost Market	March 10, 2028	Pixar Animation Studios	United States
The Great Gatsby	TBA	DNEG Animation	United States
Halloween vs. Day of the Dead	2028	Studio 100 Film; Lunch Films	Mexico; Germany
The Haunting of Hotel Transylvania	October 8, 2027	Amazon MGM Studios; Sony Pictures Animation	United States
Hexed	November 25, 2026	Walt Disney Animation Studios	United States
High in the Clouds	July 7, 2027	Gaumont Animation; MPL Communications; Unique Features; PolyGram Entertainment	United States; United Kingdom; France
I, Chihuahua	TBA	Mexopolis; Snafu Pictures	United States
Ice Age: Boiling Point	February 5, 2027	20th Century Animation	United States
The Ice Dragon	TBA	Warner Bros. Pictures Animation	United States
Illumikitty	TBA	Pearl Studio	United States
Incredibles 3	June 16, 2028	Pixar Animation Studios	United States
Kittened	2027	SND; Mac Guff	France
Lovebirds	January 27, 2027	TAT Productions; KMBO	France
The Lunar Chronicles	November 3, 2028	Locksmith Animation; Warner Bros. Pictures Animation	United Kingdom; United States
Margie Claus	November 5, 2027	Warner Bros. Pictures Animation; On the Day Productions	United States
Meet the Flintstones	TBA	Warner Bros. Pictures Animation	United States
Metal Men	TBA	Warner Bros. Pictures Animation; DC Entertainment	United States
Mission Granny	2028	Global Constellation; Samsara Filmproduktion; White Spot Films	United Kingdom
Monkey Base	TBA	SLR Productions; Sinking Ship Entertainment	Australia
Not Alone	April 16, 2027	Illumination	United States
Oh, the Places You'll Go!	March 17, 2028	Warner Bros. Pictures Animation; Dr. Seuss Enterprises; Bad Robot Productions	United States
On the Edge	May 6, 2027	Studio 100 Film; Studio 100 International; Viva Pictures	United States
Peeps	TBA	Wonder Street	United States
Pet Robots	2028	BlueDream Studios	United States
Pierre the Pigeon-Hawk	February 13, 2027	Toonz Media Group; Gold Valley Films; Telegal; Exodus Media Group; Sugar Water Entertainment	United States; Ireland; India
Princess Awesome	TBA	Aniventure	United States
Rainbow Serpent	TBA	Paramount Animation; Imagine Entertainment	United States
Ray Gunn	December 18, 2026	Netflix; Skydance Animation	United States
The Secret Life of Pets 3	TBA	Illumination	United States
Shrek 5	June 30, 2027	DreamWorks Animation	United States
Sing 3	TBA	Illumination	United States
Untitled fourth Trolls film	TBA	DreamWorks Animation	United States
Sky & Luna	TBA	POC Studios; Man of Action Entertainment; Creation Station; Composition Media	United States
Spider-Man: Beyond the Spider-Verse	June 18, 2027	Sony Pictures Animation; Marvel Entertainment	United States
Stray Dogs	TBA	Paramount Animation; Image Comics; Coin Operated	United States
Steps	November 20, 2026	Netflix Animation Studios; Paper Kite Productions	United States
Super Roach	TBA	Aniventure	United Kingdom
Thing One and Thing Two	TBA	Warner Bros. Pictures; Warner Bros. Pictures Animation; Dr. Seuss Enterprises	United States
Trouble	TBA	Spire Animation Studios; Rough House Pictures	United States
The Unicorn That Said No	January 1, 2027	Studio Soi; X Filme Creative Pool; Warner Bros. Film Productions Germany	Germany
Untitled Barbie film	TBA	Illumination; Mattel Studios	United States
Untitled Dog Man sequel	TBA	DreamWorks Animation	United States
Untitled fourth Madagascar film	TBA	DreamWorks Animation	United States
Untitled Ghostbusters spin-off film	TBA	Netflix; Sony Pictures Animation; Ghost Corps	United States
Untitled Jack and the Beanstalk film	TBA	Netflix; Skydance Animation	United States
Untitled KPop Demon Hunters sequel	2029	Netflix; Sony Pictures Animation	United States
Untitled The Mitchells vs. the Machines sequel	TBA	Netflix; Sony Pictures Animation; Lord Miller Productions	United States
Untitled Monsters, Inc. sequel	TBA	Pixar Animation Studios	United States
Untitled Teenage Mutant Ninja Turtles: Mutant Mayhem sequel	August 13, 2027	Nickelodeon Movies; Point Grey Pictures	United States
Untitled third The Bad Guys film	TBA	DreamWorks Animation	United States
Untitled third The Boss Baby film	TBA	DreamWorks Animation	United States
ViQueens	December 26, 2026	Zwart Arbeid	Norway
Wed Wabbit	TBA	Locksmith Animation; Sky Cinema; Cantilever Media; Timeless Films	United Kingdom
The Wild Robot Escapes	TBA	DreamWorks Animation	United States
Wish Dragon 2	Summer 2027	Netflix; Sony Pictures Animation; Base FX	United States
Yes Chef!	2028	nWave Studios	France; Belgium
Zac Power	January 7, 2027	Cheeky Little Media; Flying Bark Productions; Pixel Zoo Animation Studios; Studio 100 Film; Viva Pictures	Australia; New Zealand
Zootopia 3	TBA	Walt Disney Animation Studios	United States

== See also ==
- History of animation
- Timeline of CGI in film and television
- List of animated feature films
- List of stop motion films
- List of computer-animated television series
- Academy Award for Best Animated Feature
