= Special Delivery =

Special Delivery may refer to:

- Special delivery (postal service), a postal service for urgent postal packets

== Literature ==
- "Special Delivery" (short story), a 1953 short story by Damon Knight
- Special Delivery (novel), a 1997 novel by Danielle Steel
- Special Delivery, a Thomas & Friends 2006 PC game

== Music ==
- Special Delivery (Della Reese album), a 1961 album by Della Reese
- Special Delivery (38 Special album), a 1978 album by .38 Special
- Special Delivery (Dottie West album), a 1980 album by Dottie West
- Special Delivery, an album by Milly y los Vecinos
- "Special Delivery" (song), a song by rapper G. Dep
- "Special Delivery", a song by the 1910 Fruitgum Company from the 1969 album Indian Giver
- "Special Delivery", a song by The Offspring from the 2000 album Conspiracy of One
- "Special Delivery", a song by Bridget Kelly, her debut single from 2012

== Film ==
- Special Delivery (1922 film), directed by Fatty Arbuckle
- Special Delivery (1927 film), also directed by Arbuckle
- Special Delivery (1946 film), produced by the United States Army Air Forces
- Special Delivery (1955 film), directed by John Brahm
- Special Delivery (1976 film), with Cybill Shepherd and Sorrell Booke
- Special Delivery (1978 film), winner of the 1978 Academy Award for Animated Short Film
- Special Delivery (1999 film), film with Brie Larson, Logan O'Brien and Penny Marshall
- Special Delivery (2000 film), television film with Andy Dick
- Special Delivery (2002 film), French film
- Special Delivery (2008 film), television film with Lisa Edelstein & Brenda Song
- Special Delivery (2022 film), South Korean crime action film
- A Special Delivery, a 1916 film starring Oliver Hardy
- Big Trip 2: Special Delivery, a 2022 Russian animated adventure comedy film which is also a sequel to the 2019 animated film The Big Trip.

== Television ==
- Special Delivery (TV series), a Nickelodeon block of programming that existed in the 1980s and early 1990s
- Special Delivery, a 2008 web series on MySpaceTV
- Brandy: Special Delivery, a 2002 reality show starring R&B-singer Brandy
- "Special Delivery", a 1959 episode of the TV series Alfred Hitchcock Presents, written by Ray Bradbury
- "Special Delivery", a 2014 episode of TV series Best of Luck Nikki, an Indian adaptation of Good Luck Charlie
- "Special Delivery", an episode of the TV series The Backyardigans
- "Special Delivery", an episode of the TV series Beavis and Butt-head
- "Special Delivery", an episode of the TV series CSI: Miami
- "Special Delivery", an episode of the TV series Pucca
- "Special Delivery", an episode of the TV series PB&J Otter
- "Special Delivery", an episode of the TV series Rugrats
- "Special Delivery", an episode of the TV series Wow! Wow! Wubbzy!

== Other uses ==
- Five Nights at Freddy's: Special Delivery, a 2019 augumented reality video game
