= Holy Night =

Holy Night may refer to:

- "Holy Night" (The West Wing), a 2002 episode of The West Wing
- Holy Night (album), a Christmas album by Kevin Max

== See also ==
- O Holy Night, a Christmas carol
- Holy Night!, a 2009 Spanish animated feature film
