= Midsummer Dream =

2005 film by Ángel de la Cruz

- Spanish theatrical release poster
- Directed by: Ángel de la Cruz; Manolo Gómez
- Written by: Ángel de la Cruz; Beatriz Iso
- Produced by: Manolo Gómez
- Starring: Romola Garai; Bernard Hill; Billy Boyd; Rhys Ifans; Miranda Richardson; Fiona Shaw; Toby Stephens
- Cinematography: Manuel Alvariño
- Music by: Sergio Pena Castro; Arturo B. Kress
- Production company: Dygra Films
- Distributed by: Buena Vista International
- Release date: 1 July 2005 (Spain)
- Running time: 85 minutes
- Countries: Spain; Portugal
- Languages: Spanish; English
- Box office: $1,086,122

Midsummer Dream (Spanish: El Sueño de una noche de San Juan, lit. 'A Dream of a Night of Saint John' (Note: The feast of Saint John, celebrated on the night of June 23, being the traditional midsummer feast in Spain and Portugal.)) is a 2005 animated film from Dygra Films, the creators of The Living Forest. Made in Spain and Portugal, the film is loosely based on William Shakespeare's play A Midsummer Night's Dream.

== Character ==
The main character is the girl Helena, a princess.

== Voice cast ==
The voice cast of the English speaking version includes:

- Romola Garai as Helena
- Bernard Hill as Theseus
- Billy Boyd as Puck
- Rhys Ifans as Lysander
- Miranda Richardson as Titania
- Fiona Shaw as The Witches
- Toby Stephens as Demetrius

== Production ==
Directed by Ángel de la Cruz and Manolo Gómez, the production team totalled over 400 people over the lifetime of the project.

== Reception ==
The film was a box office failure, managing to gross only $1,086,122.

== Accolades ==
The film received the 2006 Goya Award for animated films.

== See also ==
- List of Spanish films of 2005

== Sources ==
- "Sueno de una Noche de San Juan, El (English Version)". British Universities Film and Video Council. n.d.
- Silió, Elisa (1 July 2005). "Sueño de una noche de San Juan se inspira en Shakespeare". El País.
