= Monster Family =

2017 film by Holger Tappe

- Theatrical release poster
- Directed by: Holger Tappe
- Screenplay by: David Safier; Catharina Junk
- Based on: Happy Family by David Safier
- Produced by: Holger Tappe
- Starring: Emily Watson; Nick Frost; Jessica Brown Findlay; Celia Imrie; Catherine Tate; Jason Isaacs
- Edited by: Björn Teubner
- Music by: Hendrik Schwarzer
- Production companies: Ambient Entertainment; United Entertainment; Mack Media; Agir; Rothkirch Cartoon Film; Sky Cinema Original Films; VideoBack
- Distributed by: Warner Bros. Pictures (Germany); Altitude Film Distribution (United Kingdom)
- Release dates: 24 August 2017 (Germany); 2 March 2018 (United Kingdom)
- Running time: 93 minutes
- Countries: Germany; United Kingdom
- Language: English
- Budget: $30 million
- Box office: $27.8 million

Monster Family (also known as Happy Family in Germany) is a 2017 animated monster comedy film directed by Holger Tappe, and written by David Safier and Catharina Junk, based on Safier's 2011 novel Happy Family. The film stars Emily Watson, Nick Frost, Jessica Brown Findlay, Celia Imrie, Catherine Tate, and Jason Isaacs.

The film received generally negative reviews from critics, and was a box-office bomb, grossing $27.8 million against a $30 million budget. A sequel titled Monster Family 2 was released in 2021.

== Plot ==
In Transylvania, Count Dracula laments about his loneliness with his three bat servants. He receives a phone call from Emma Wishbone who has mistakenly called him instead of a monster costume store. She talks to him briefly before accidentally dropping her cell phone down a storm drain. Emma is depressed as family tensions build up - her own bookstore is in dire financial straits, her son Max is a victim of bullying due to his awkward and stereotypical mannerisms, her daughter Fay is a narcissistic teenager, and her husband Frank is overworked and sleep-deprived, neglecting her. Dracula decides to make Emma his new bride and persuades Baba Yaga to curse her and turn her into a real vampire so she will stay with him.

Her new-age friend Cheyenne gives Emma some tickets to a costume party, and Emma makes costumes for Emma's family: She as a vampire, Frank as Frankenstein's monster, Fay as a mummy, and Max as a werewolf. Due to a mix-up at the party, they are thrown out by security, causing Emma to have a breakdown. Baba Yaga takes advantage of the situation and curses her, but as her entire family were unhappy, they are all cursed and transform into the monsters they dressed up as.

Emma chases Baba Yaga who escapes, but not before they learn that her amulet needs to be recharged at the London Eye which happens to have been built on a site of ancient power. Meanwhile, Max scares his bully, enjoying his transformation and Fay is rejected by her school crush. Frank has lost his intelligence, but still shows love for Emma.

At the airport Fay hypnotizes a check-in clerk to allow them to fly, but during the flight Emma is overwhelmed by vampiric bloodlust, and only a timely intervention from Dracula halts this and he absconds with the confused and blood-hungry Emma aboard his personal jet leaving her family on the passenger plane.

Dracula tries to persuade Emma to stay with him, and although tempted she decides to be loyal to her family. This causes Dracula to eject her from his plane where she lands next to the London Eye just as her family arrive. Meanwhile, Dracula decides that if he cannot have Emma, nobody can. He instructs his hunchback servant Renfield to prepare a snowflake machine to destroy the world in retaliation.

Baba Yaga charges her amulet but is accosted by the Wishbones, but she sends them to Egypt. Cheyenne tries to help, but after rescuing Baba Yaga from falling to her death the two become friends. Baba Yaga explains that Dracula intended for her to curse only Emma, but the entire family's unhappiness caused them all to change - only the entire family being happy will break the curse.

In Egypt, the family has another argument culminating in them all walking off in different directions: Fay meets Imhotep who believes her to be beautiful and wants to take over the world with her help. Max finds a hotel where all the guests are scared of him, and Frank rescues a group of supermodels who take him back to their hotel, the same one Max is at.

Emma is once again consumed by bloodlust and is once again rescued by Dracula. Despite being tempted by him again she still misses her family, who appears in the castle after a repentant Baba Yaga transports them there. Renfield explains Dracula's plan to shoot a giant snowball into the Sun, killing all life apart from vampires who do not need the sun to survive. While Dracula is in his Lazarus pool which ensures his youth, the family plans to add holy water to it, killing him, but he overpowers them. Realizing they need to work together and are happy to be together the curse is broken and they all turn back to human form. With the help of Renfield and the servant bats, they trap Dracula between beams of sunlight and freeze him with his snowflake weapon.

The Wishbones return home, and their circumstances change. Frank stands up for himself at work after putting a photo of their family adventure and the frozen Dracula on his desk, Max's bully has realised the error of his ways and befriends him, and Fay meets a nerd in a knight's costume at a costume party that Emma throws at home. Baba Yaga, Renfield, and the three bats crash the party. The family takes another photo together, showing their happiness.

== Voice cast ==
=== English cast ===
- Emily Watson as Emma Wishbone, the matriarch of the Wishbone family. She is turned into a vampire.
- Nick Frost as Frank Wishbone, the patriarch of the Wishbone family who is Emma's husband and the father of Fay and Max. He is turned into a monster similar to Frankenstein's monster.
- Jessica Brown Findlay as Fay Wishbone, the daughter of Emma and Frank who is turned into a mummy.
- Ethan Rouse as Max Wishbone, the son of Emma and Frank who is turned into a werewolf.
- Celia Imrie as Cheyenne, Emma's co-worker at her bookstore and family friend.
- Catherine Tate as Baba Yaga, Dracula's former captive witch. She is responsible for turning the Wishbone family into monsters.
- Jason Isaacs as Count Dracula, a vampire who becomes infatuated with Emma.
- Ewan Bailey as Renfield, Baba Yaga's husband and Dracula's former butler.
- Issac Rouse as Jayden, Fay's boyfriend.
- Daniel Ben-Zenou as Imhotep, a mummy who teaches Fay how to use her mummy abilities.
- Jessica McDonald as Sheila, Fay's school friend.
- Sidney Dorn as Bull, the school bully who picks on Max.
- Emma Tate as Head Model
- Dirk Stollberg, Jan Makino, and Rainer Fritzsche as Dracula's bats

== Reception ==
On Rotten Tomatoes, the film has an approval rating of 10% based on 21 reviews, and an average rating of 3.40/10. The critical consensus reads: "Monster Family promises a family-friendly animated monster mash, but succeeds only in delivering a viewing experience so lackluster that parents may find it genuinely frightening".

=== Box office ===
The film was a box office flop. It grossed $127,259 in the US, £443,269 in the UK, $4,692,430 in Germany and $21,178,934 in other countries for a worldwide total of $26,441,982, making it a commercial failure.

== Release ==
The film was theatrically released in the United Kingdom on 2 March 2018 and was released on Sky Cinema on the same day. Monster Family was released on DVD in the UK on 2 October of the same year by Universal Pictures Home Entertainment.
