= List of original programs distributed by MySpaceTV =

This is a list of original programs distributed by MySpaceTV.

== Original programming ==
=== Drama ===
Title	Genre	Premiere	Seasons	Length	Status
Roommates	Drama	October 22, 2007	1 season, 45 episodes	-	Ended
Wolfpack of Reseda	Drama	February 17, 2012	1 season, 8 episodes	8 min.	Ended

=== Reality shows ===
Title	Genre	Premiere	Seasons	Length	Status
Special Delivery	Reality	February 26, 2008	1 season, 18 episodes	3 min.	Ended
Married on MySpace	Reality	May 15, 2009	2 seasons, 14 episodes		Ended

=== Documentary ===
Title	Genre	Premiere	Seasons	Length	Status
Freshman 15				-	Ended

=== Syndication ===
Title	Genre	Premiere	Seasons	Length	Status
Prom Queen	Drama	April 1, 2007		90 seconds	Ended
Afterworld	Sci-fi	August 23, 2007	1 season, 42 episodes		Ended
Prom Queen: Summer Heat	Drama	August 27, 2007	1 season, 15 episodes	2 min.	Ended
lonelygirl15	Drama			-	Ended
Quarterlife	Drama	November 11, 2007	1 season, 36 episodes	8 min.	Ended

=== International ===
==== UK ====
Title	Genre	Premiere	Seasons	Length	Status
Freak	Teen drama	July 20, 2009	1 season, 16 episodes		Ended
