= Spirit of the Forest (film) =

Spirit Of The Forest
- Film poster
- Spanish: Espíritu del bosque
- Directed by: David Rubin
- Written by: Beatriz Iso
- Produced by: Manolo Gómez
- Starring: Sean Astin; Giovanni Ribisi; Ron Perlman; Anjelica Huston
- Music by: Arturo B. Kress
- Production company: Dygra Films
- Distributed by: Manga Entertainment
- Release date: September 12, 2008
- Running time: 90 minutes
- Country: Spain
- Language: English
- Box office: $1,246,516

Spirit of the Forest, (Spanish: Espíritu del bosque) is a 2008 Galician computer-animated family film directed by David Rubin for Dygra Films; it is a sequel to The Living Forest. The film was released in Spain on September 12, 2008.

== Plot ==
Mrs. D'Abondo wants the forest of the living trees to be cut down to make way for a highway, but Furi, Cebolo, Tigre and other animals manage to defeat her to save it.

== Voice cast ==
The voice cast of the English speaking version includes:

- Sean Astin as Furi
- Giovanni Ribisi as Cebolo
- Ron Perlman as Oak
- Anjelica Huston as Mrs. D'Abondo

=== Additional voices ===
Nevertheless, most of the voice production for this film was recorded in London at St Anne's Court, now part of Ascent Media. English voices include talented actors such as

- Tom Clark-Hill as Eucalyptus, Tigre, Mr. D'Abondo and Triston
- Jo Wyatt as Pearl
- Eric Meyers as Rosendo and Rodemor
- Laurence Bouvard as Linda and Baby
- Martin T. Sherman as Hu-Hu and Piorno
- Stefan Ashton Frank as Hoho, Magnate and Cuscus
- Laurel Lefkow as Holm Oak and Sabela
- Stéphane Cornicard as Twins
- Glenn Wrage as Gordo and Pine

Recording sessions were cast and directed by Xevi Fernandez, who specialises in Spanish-English-Spanish film dubbing. The cast of actors (above) were recorded in Hollywood.
