= Monster Family 2 =

2021 film by Holger Tappe

- Theatrical release poster
- Directed by: Holger Tappe
- Screenplay by: David Safier
- Based on: Happy Family by David Safier
- Produced by: Holger Tappe
- Starring: Emily Watson; Nick Frost; Jessica Brown Findlay; Catherine Tate; Jason Isaacs
- Music by: Apollon de Moura; Adrian Gucze; Jascha Heldicke; Sascha Knorr; Eric Krause; Andreas Kübler; Sebastian Kübler; Florian Wunsch
- Production companies: Ambient Entertainment; Rothkirch Cartoon Film; Sky Cinema Original Films
- Distributed by: Warner Bros. Pictures (Germany); Sky Group (United Kingdom)
- Release dates: 15 October 2021 (United States); 22 October 2021 (United Kingdom); 4 November 2021 (Germany)
- Running time: 103 minutes
- Countries: Germany; United Kingdom
- Language: English
- Budget: $40 million
- Box office: $6.7 million

Monster Family 2 (also known as Monster Family 2: Nobody's Perfect and released as Happy Family 2 in Germany) is a 2021 animated comedy horror film directed and produced by Holger Tappe, and written by David Safier. A sequel to the 2017 film Monster Family, the voice cast includes Emily Watson, Jason Isaacs, Nick Frost, Jessica Brown Findlay, Catherine Tate, Ethan Rouse (all reprising their roles) and Emily Carey.

The film was released via video on demand in the UK as a Sky Cinema Original Film by the Sky Group on 22 October 2021, and was released in US cinemas by VivaKids a week earlier on 15 October.

== Plot ==
A young girl named Mila, a member of the Starr family, infiltrates Count Dracula's castle to capture him, who has been frozen by the Wishbone family. (Note: As depicted in Monster Family (2017)) The Starr family instructs Mila to capture Baba Yaga on her next mission.

The Wishbone family visits a wedding to witness Yaga and Renfield getting married. Mila arrives and kidnaps both witches. The Starr family then give her a mission to capture Nessie, the Loch Ness Monster. Max, determined to save both witches, uses Yaga's magic amulet to transform his family into monsters, as before. The Wishbones reach Loch Ness aboard Dracula's aircraft. As a fight with Mila ensues, she manages to capture Nessie. As Mila returns to the surface, Max develops a relationship with Mila, but she leaves to go to a snow mountain to capture a yeti. The Wishbones follow her to the mountains, but Fay accidentally triggers an avalanche, which knocks Mila onto a cliff, being saved by Max. She then reluctantly sets out to Tora Tora to capture her final monster.

As the Wishbones reach Tora Tora, they befriend a giant gorilla named King Conga. Mila captures the gorilla and takes it back to the lab, where all the monsters are injected into a clone of herself dubbed Mila 2.0. Her family reveals that Mila is not part of them, and Mila 2.0 is ordered to eliminate the original Mila. As she flees in tears, the Wishbone family arrive, and she shares what happened. After a struggle with Mila 2.0, she captures and takes the group to the Starr family. The Wishbones are reverted to their normal forms. Max tries to shrink Mila 2.0 with a shrink gun, but ends up wrecking the headquarters, inadvertently shrinking the Starrs in the process, who quickly flee. The Wishbones free the monsters in the ensuing destruction; Dracula also escapes and swears revenge, only to be quickly shrunken by Max, along with Mila 2.0.

The headquarters begins to collapse, prompting the Wishbones and the monsters to flee. While Mila rescues a falling Max, Mila 2.0 blinds the original Mila, leaving Max to give command to Mila's control. They successfully evade the collapsing headquarters, and they return to the surface. Yaga and Renfield are then successfully married, before imprisoning Dracula in a smaller version of his castle, and he enacts revenge against the Wishbones.

== Voice cast ==
- Emily Watson as Emma Wishbone, the matriarch of the Wishbone family who is turned into a vampire again.
- Nick Frost as Frank Wishbone, the patriarch of the Wishbone family who is turned into Frankenstein's monster again.
- Jessica Brown Findlay as Fay Wishbone, the daughter of Emma and Frank who is turned into a mummy again.
- Ethan Rouse as Max Wishbone, the son of Emma and Frank who is turned into a werewolf again.
- Catherine Tate as Baba Yaga, a witch who is now friends with the Wishbone family.
- Jason Isaacs as:
  - Count Dracula, a vampire and the Wishbone family's old nemesis who seeks revenge on them for foiling his plans even though he is the first monster the Starr family had captured. Although he was the main antagonist in the first film, he is the secondary antagonist in this sequel.
  - Dracula A.I., the A.I. of the jet that the Wishbone family uses.
- Emily Carey as:
  - Mila Starr, an expert monster hunter.
  - Mila 2.0
- Rebecca Camp as Girl #1
- Daniel Ben Zenou as Maddox Starr, a billionaire philanthropist who is the father of Mila and one of the main antagonists in this film.
- Emma Tate as:
  - Marlene Starr, a billionaire philanthropist who is the mother of Mila and one of the main antagonists in this film.
  - Girl #2
  - Female News Presenter
- Ewan Bailey as:
  - Renfield, a hunchbacked former servant of Count Dracula and Baba Yaga's fiancé.
  - Reverend
  - Fisherman
  - Male News Presenter
  - Farmer
- Matt Roberts as Protester
- Oliver Kalfkofe as a Yeti that the Starr family caught.
- Tilo Schmitz as King Konga, a giant gorilla.

== Release ==
Monster Family 2 was released on October 15, 2021 by VivaKids in the United States, and then on October 22 as a Sky Cinema original by Sky in the United Kingdom. It was later released on Blu-ray and DVD on February 7, 2022 as a 2-movie collection with the original film Monster Family by Universal Pictures Home Entertainment (through Warner Bros. Home Entertainment).

== Reception ==
On the review aggregator website Rotten Tomatoes, 20% of 5 critics' reviews are positive, with an average rating of 3.8/10. Tom Cassidy of Common Sense Media gave Monster Family 2 a negative review, calling it "frightfully bad" and "a hollow experience". A review in Stuff.co.nz described the film as "a pallid, insipid sequel that will struggle to entertain even the most undemanding primary schooler". Pablo De Vita of La Nación offered a more positive review, stating that the film was entertaining, albeit derivative.
