= Wompkees =

The Wompkees are a children's animated program created by Con Fullam and Maura Clarke, and are owned by Wompkee LLC. As of December 2009, two 54 minute movies have been produced in association with Deos Animation, led by Mike DeVitto, and are being distributed internationally by MarVista Entertainment. The first movie was released in 2003, titled A Very Wompkee Christmas. The feature aired in the US on Starz; has been released in more than 40 countries worldwide; and in Latin America, DVD Distributor Tycoon sold more than 70,000 units. The writers of the first feature, Peter Hunziker and Cynthia Riddle (Nickelodeon's Rugrats, The Wild Thornberrys) reprise their roles in the second feature titled The Hidden Treasure of Wompkee Wood released in 2009. Voice direction was once again provided by Fred Newman (Who Framed Roger Rabbit). The Wompkees have a line of plush toys and finger puppets manufactured by Mary Meyer Corporation. Deos Animation and Con Fullam have also collaborated on another children's program titled Ribert and Robert's Wonderworld. The Wompkees are represented by Red Sky Entertainment in NYC.

== Premise ==
The Wompkees are furry, big eared elfin-like creatures that have the ability to communicate with all the beings and animals in the world. Each Wompkee represents a different set of personality traits; no two are alike. They reside in the magical Wompkee Wood, eating Wompberries, and having adventures. As positive role models, children and parents can relate to and see themselves through one or more of the Wompkees. Curious and adventurous, the Wompkees are often faced with situations that require teamwork and brave action to save the day. Using their special ability to communicate with all creatures, the Wompkees affirm that through the power of using our words and our hearts, we can solve many of our problems.

== Wompkee Characters ==
Gran: The matriarch of the Wompkee Wood. Wise and warm and full of love. Loves to read books. Voiced by Mary Elaine Monti.

Twig: The youngest Wompkee, very brave, but impulsive. Sweet and sincere, full of curiosity and a bit of mischief. Voiced by Lynn Lambert. (Credited as Lynne Lambert).

Hummer: Inventor who thinks there is no problem he cannot solve. He provides complex solutions to simple problems, that cause chaos. Voiced by Fred Newman.

Daisy: The athlete. A big sister figure to Twig, but tires of acting like a grownup. Voices by Kelli Rabke.

Scout: Adventurous with a “can do” spirit. Very self-assured and the inclined to leadership. This Wompkee is sometimes called "Brett." Voiced by Chris Phillips.

Buster: Strong, but sensitive, and struggles with confidence. Overindulges in Wompberries. Voiced by Alice Playten.

== History ==
The Wompkees were created in 1994 by married couple Con Fullam and Maura Clarke, in Portland, Maine. Fullam is a career musician, songwriter, and producer, with work published by MCA Universal, Sony/BMG, Warner/Chappell, Acuff Rose, Opryland, and Chrysalis Music. Clarke is also a recording artist who released a 12-song CD titled "Songs From The Somewhere" in 2006. The Wompkees debuted in a paperback children's book titled “The Wompkees First Grand Adventure", written by Mark Medford and illustrated by Heather Shipman. It was accompanied with an audio cassette and plush Wompkee stuffed toy. In 2002, Con met Mike DeVitto, President of Deos Animation of Lawrence, Massachusetts. Using the SAM animation technique pioneered by Deos, the team created the first full-length Wompkee movie titled "A Very Wompkee Christmas" that was released in 2003. Within the year, the movie made its broadcast debut on public television where it cleared 70% of all U.S. households including nine of the top ten markets. Concurrent with the broadcast of the movie came a distribution deal between Wompkee LLC and Sony Wonder for the domestic sales and distribution of the DVD. In addition, an international sales and distribution agreement was reached between Wompkee LLC and MarVista Entertainment. When Sony Wonder closed down, the project was put on hold until the fall of 2007, when Con created a separate movie division under the heading of Wompkee Movies LLC, which is owned by Wompkee LLC. Production began on the second full-length movie that was finished in May 2009, titled The Hidden Treasure of Wompkee Wood. The 54 minute movie was released in High Definition Blu-ray. Both movies are now in international distribution through MarVista Entertainment.

== DVD releases ==
A Very Wompkee Christmas Running Time: 54 minutes Released November 2003. It's Christmas Eve in Wompkee Wood and the Wompkees are preparing for a celebration. Twig, the littlest Wompkee, hopes her biggest wish will come true; being able to fly like all the other Wompkees. She wants to learn in time to place the star at the top of the Wompkee Christmas tree. Will Twig's dream come true, or will the evil ice witch, Iglora Borealis, ruin the Wompkee's Christmas celebration? The movie features 3D animation made possible by the Deos Animation SAM system or Structured Animation Method.

Deos Animation Created by Con Fullam and Maura Clarke Directed by Mike DeVitto Executive Producers: Mike DeVitto, Con Fullam, Scott Guy Written by: Peter Hunzinger and Cynthia Riddle Cast: Laura Darrell (lead vocals), Lynn Lambert (Twig), Mary Elaine Monti (Gran, Iglora), Fred Newman (Hummer, Woofus), Chris Phillips (Scout), Alice Payton (Buster), Kelli Rabke (Daisy)

Hidden Treasure of Wompkee Wood Running Time: 54 minutes Released in May 2009. When the littlest Wompkee, Twig, discovers a treasure map, the Wompkees set out on an adventure to recover an ancient glowing stone that will restore the power of universal language to all the Wompkees. It's not always easy going, but the Wompkees rise to the challenge. The discovery and ultimate return of the stone gives the Wompkees the ability to speak the languages of all animals in the world.

Deos Animation Created by Con Fullam and Maura Clarke Directed by Mike DeVitto, Jamie Norton Executive Producers: Tom Talbott, Mike DeVitto, Con Fullam Written by: Peter Hunzinger, Cynthia Riddle, Con Fullam Cast: Lynn Lambert (Twig), Mary Elaine Monti (Gran, Iglora), Fred Newman (Hummer, Woofus, Chipper), Tom Pakulski (Scout, Woodland animals), Alice Payton (Buster), Kelli Rabke (Daisy)

== Wompkee Plush Toys and Finger Puppets ==
In 1994, Wompkee partnered with Mary Meyer of Townsend, Vermont, to make Wompkee finger puppets and plush toys.
