= Tarzan (2013 film) =

German animated film

- Theatrical release poster
- Directed by: Reinhard Klooss
- Written by: Reinhard Klooss
- Based on: Tarzan by Edgar Rice Burroughs
- Produced by: Robert Kulzer; Reinhard Klooss
- Starring: Kellan Lutz; Spencer Locke; Jaime Ray Newman; Robert Capron; Mark Deklin; Trevor St. John; Brian Huskey
- Narrated by: Jason Hildebrandt
- Cinematography: Marcus Eckert
- Edited by: Alexander Dittner
- Music by: David Newman
- Production companies: Constantin Film; Ambient Entertainment
- Distributed by: Constantin Film
- Release dates: 17 October 2013 (Russia); 20 February 2014 (Germany)
- Running time: 94 minutes
- Country: Germany
- Language: English
- Budget: €25 million
- Box office: €44.1 million

Tarzan is a 2013 English-language German animated action-adventure film based on the Tarzan stories by Edgar Rice Burroughs. Written, directed and produced by Reinhard Klooss, the film features the voices of Kellan Lutz and Spencer Locke. The story sees Tarzan (Lutz), a helicopter crash survivor who was raised by apes, as he meets and teams up with Jane Porter (Locke) to protect an energy-abundant meteor from the CEO of Tarzan's late father's company.

Tarzan premiered in Russia on 17 October 2013, before releasing in Germany on 20 February 2014. It was distributed in Germany by Constantin Film. The film grossed €44.1 million worldwide against a budget of €25 million, despite receiving predominantly negative reviews from critics.

== Plot ==
In prehistoric times, a meteor crashed into Earth and killed all the dinosaurs. In the present day, industrialist John Greystoke funds an expedition to Uganda to locate the meteor and harness its energy. Aided by scientist James Porter, the expedition is a failure and John decides to leave with his wife and their son John Jr.

While flying over a semi-active volcano, the Greystokes' helicopter's instruments go haywire. Forced to land on the meteor, John explores a cave and discovers glowing rock formations. Using his pickaxe, John collects a sample, only to cause a chain reaction that awakens the volcano. While trying to escape, their helicopter crashes, with only John Jr. surviving. The boy is discovered by the mountain gorilla Kala, who recently lost her child. Adopted into the troop, John chooses to be called "Tarzan," a name he made up meaning "Ape with no fur."

Tarzan grows up learning the ways of the animals. After the Greystokes' disappearance, Dr. James Porter funds his expeditions by acting as a jungle guide for wealthy tourists. During a routine safari, a client wanders away from the group, attracting the attention of a cassowary. Dr. Porter's daughter Jane saves him by putting herself in danger, as she is bitten by a viper. Infatuated with the girl, Tarzan carries Jane to a shelter and cures her. The next day, she returns to her father's camp with only vague memories of the night before.

Confused by exposure to humans after so long, Tarzan decides to leave his gorilla family. He wanders to the site of the helicopter crash, finds the meteor stone his father took, and builds a shelter. Years later, Tublat, the apes' abusive leader, noses around Tarzan's shelter and accidentally activates the helicopter's emergency beacon. The transmission is received by Greystoke Energies. William Clayton, the current CEO, knowing what John senior was looking for, sees a chance to make money. He promises Jane, who now works for a conservation group, to fund her organization if she accompanies him to Africa to speak with her father.

In Africa, Jane is disgusted by Clayton's greed. She leaves the party, wanders into the jungle, and finds Tarzan, now a man. Astounded, he brings her to his refuge. As a mark of love, Tarzan chips off a piece of the meteor rock and gives it to her. The rest of the group tracks Jane down there, where Clayton is shocked to find the Greystoke heir alive. Seeing him as a threat to his power, Clayton starts to shoot. The couple flees and is forced to enter a valley affected by the meteor, which causes unique mutations in the local flora and fauna, turning them into monsters. Surviving many dangers, the couple reaches the meteor, where Tarzan recognizes his father's long-abandoned pickaxe. Jane realizes Tarzan's true identity as John's son.

Tarzan returns to his ape tribe, where he introduces Jane to Kala and challenges Tublat for the right to lead. In the ensuing fight, Tarzan defeats Tublat and exiles him from the troop. That night, Jane and Tarzan admit to their love.

Meanwhile, Clayton transforms Dr. Porter's base into an armed base filled with mercenaries. A conflict later ensues between the couple and Clayton's men. Kala runs in to protect Tarzan and Jane, getting shot in the process. Tarzan is attacked from behind and locked in a cage. Aided by his gorilla friends, he escapes, moves Kala into the jungle, and treats her wound, determined to get his revenge. Clayton moves his resources to the meteor and rigs it with explosives. Tied up there and left to die, Jane and her father are rescued by Tarzan. Dr. Porter decides to stay behind and try to stop the blasting. In the ensuing battle, Tarzan summons his animal friends with a scream, the meteor awakens the volcano and the mountain begins to give way. While Clayton and his crew fall to their demise, Jane and Tarzan escape.

The couple reunites with Tarzan's family and vows to protect the forest. Meanwhile, Dr. Porter climbs up the cliff where he has gotten a piece of the meteor.

== Cast ==
- Kellan Lutz as John Greystoke Jr. / Tarzan, a man who was raised by Mountain gorillas from childhood following his survival of the helicopter crash that killed his parents.
  - Craig Garner and Jonathan Morgan Heit as 4-year-old Tarzan
  - Anton Zetterholm as a teenage Tarzan
- Spencer Locke as Jane Porter, the daughter of Dr. Porter and Tarzan's love interest.
- Jaime Ray Newman as Alice Greystoke, Tarzan's mother who died in a helicopter crash along with her husband.
- Robert Capron as Derek
- Mark Deklin as John Greystoke, the father of Tarzan and former CEO of Greystoke Energies. Before his death, John was exploring the site of an ancient meteor crash and was on the brink of a discovery.
- Trevor St. John as William Clayton, the greedy and scheming CEO of Greystoke Energies who sends a mercenary army to eliminate Tarzan and Jane.
- Brian Huskey as Smith
- Faton Millanaj as Miles
- Maximilian Nepomuk Allgeier as Pilot 2
- Christian Serritiello as Chris
- Brian Bloom as Miller
- Andy Wareham as Tublat, the rogue Mountain gorilla who takes over Kerchak's troop.
- Jeff Burrell as Derek's Father
- Jason Hildebrandt as the narrator
- Joe Cappelletti as Professor James Porter, Jane's father, and an old friend of Tarzan's parents.

== Production ==
Development on the film was announced in August 2010 when Constantin Film acquired animation rights to the Tarzan novels from the estate of author Edgar Rice Burroughs. The film's performance capture was shot in the Bavaria Film studio in Munich, and the animation process was done at Ambient Entertainment studios at Hannover. Director Reinhard Kloos wrote the screen story and screenplay, with uncredited contributions by Jessica Postigo and Yoni Brenner.

== Soundtrack ==
Tarzan

Soundtrack album by David Newman
- Released: 2013
- Recorded: 2013
- Studio: Teldex Scoring Stage, Berlin
- Genre: Film soundtrack
- Length: 64:45
- Label: Parlophone
- Producer: David Newman

David Newman film scores chronology
A Christmas Story 2 (2012)	Tarzan (2013)	Behaving Badly (2014)

Title	Performer
"Paradise"	Coldplay
"Loud Like Love"	Placebo

== Release ==
Initially titled Tarzan 3D, the film was reportedly set to premiere in Germany on 17 October 2013., although its release date was revised and set for February 20, 2014 after its release in several other countries.

On 24 April 2014, the Irish premiere of the film was in aid of conservation charity Ape Action Africa, supported by the lead, Kellan Lutz, who is himself interested in conservation.

=== Home media ===
Tarzan was released on DVD and Blu-ray on August 5, 2014, by Lionsgate Home Entertainment.

== Reception ==
=== Critical response ===
Tarzan was not screened in advance for critics, and received predominantly negative reviews, who panned the film's story and animation. The film holds a 20% approval rating on review aggregator Rotten Tomatoes, based on 30 reviews with an average rating 4.54 out of 10. Peter Debruge of Variety called "an eyesore for anyone above the age of 10 — literally, for those opting to see it in badly miscalibrated 3D". Jordan Mintzer of The Hollywood Reporter said, "All of this feels awfully simplistic, like a 10-minute cartoon sketch bloated into a full-length movie, and one that's backed by an over-explanatory voiceover that can sometimes sound awkward." Reagan Gavin Rasquinha of The Times of India rated it 2 out of 5 stars, calling it "a slipshod rendering of a classic." Angie Errigo of Empire rated it 2 out of 5, saying, "Ponderously plotted and unwonderfully animated, this will disappoint audiences spoilt by Pixar-grade animations." Peter Bradshaw of The Guardian said, "Here's a muddled and dull new family film about Tarzan, who in keeping with tradition is as clean-shaven and all-over hairless as any male stripper." Neil Smith of Total Film said, "Phil Collins songs aside, the last animated Tarzan marked the final flourish of the Disney Renaissance and coined a whopping $448M worldwide. This computer-generated mo-cap version can’t help to compete, even without a club-footed updating that turns Edgar Rice Burrough’s loinclothed apeman into a tree-hugger defending his jungle against capitalists." and added "Having trashed one icon in The Legend Of Hercules, Kellan Lutz shafts another with vocals admittedly well-suited to the muscle-bound mannequin. What really sabotages Reinhard Klooss’ film, though, is a subplot involving a meteorite-derived power source."

=== Accolades ===
Tarzan was nominated at the Golden Trailer Awards for Best Foreign Animation/Family Trailer. At the 2014 International Film Music Critics Association Awards, it was nominated for Best Original Score for an Animated Film.
