= Ambient Entertainment =

German film production studio

Ambient Entertainment GmbH & Co. KG
- Type: Privately held company
- Industry: Film production
- Founded: October 11, 1999; 26 years ago in Hannover, Germany
- Founder: Holger Tappe; Stefan Mischke
- Headquarters: Hannover, Germany
- Key people: Holger Tappe; Stefan Mischke; Sebastian Riemen
- Number of employees: 75
- Website: www.ambient-entertainment.de

Ambient Entertainment GmbH & Co. KG is a German film production studio, specializing in CGI animation movies.

== History ==
Ambient was founded in 1999 by Holger Tappe and Stefan Mischke. Initially focused on advertising (commercials for Volkswagen, Volkswagen Commercial Vehicles, Deutsche Messe AG (CeBIT). Eventually, they moved to CGI animation for motion pictures. The debut feature was "Back to Gaya" in 2004, the first CGI motion picture produced in Germany. Followed by Impy's Island, Impy's Wonderland and Animals United which all were produced and directed by Holger Tappe. Animals United, based upon the novel of Erich Kästner, was the first 3D stereoscopic animation motion picture in Germany. Subsequent animation motion pictures were "The Secret of Balthasar Castle", produced for Europa-Park, the motion-capture animation motion picture Tarzan for Constantin-Film and The Time Caroussel, as well a 4D CGI production for Europa-Park. Movies made by Ambient Entertainment have been distributed to more than 70 countries.

== Filmography ==
- 2004: Boo, Zino & the Snurks, aka The Snurks (German: Back to Gaya)
- 2006: Impy's Island (German: Urmel aus dem Eis)
- 2008: Impy's Wonderland (German: Urmel voll in Fahrt)
- 2010: Animals United (German: Konferenz der Tiere)
- 2012: The Secret of Balthasar Castle (short) (German: Das Geheimnis von Schloß Balthasar)
- 2013: Tarzan
- 2015: The Time Carrousel (short) (German: Das Zeitkarussell)
- 2017: The Little Vampire 3D
- 2017: Monster Family
- 2021: Monster Family 2

== Festivals and awards ==
- Deutscher Innovationspreis (2004, Back to Gaya)
- 34th Giffony Filmfestival (2004; 2nd place Kids Section, "Back to Gaya")
- Animasia Festival, Seoul (2004, KAPA Price "Back to Gaya")
- Junior Filmfestival Stockholm (2005, Bästa låsatdiefilm", Back to Gaya")
- Fantasporto (2005, Nominee for International Fantasy Film Award, Back to Gaya))
- Festival Internationale de Cine de Gijon ( 2006, Best movie of 2006 "Enfants terrible", Impy's Island)
- "Highly recommended" ("Prädikat besonders wertvoll", Urmel aus dem Eis)
- Kinderfilmtage im Ruhrgebiet, (2008, "Emmi" für den besten Kinderfilm deutscher Produktion "Impy's Wonderland)
- "Highly recommended" ("Prädikat besonders wertvoll", Impy's Wonderland)
- Bayerischer Filmpreis (2010 Kinderfilm "Animals United")
- German Filmaward (2011, Nominee "Animals United")
- Goldener Spatz (2011, Bester Children's film "Animals United")
- "Highly recommended" ("Prädikat besonders wertvoll", 2011 "Animals United")
- Goldener Spatz (2014, Animationsfilm "Tarzan")
- "Highly recommended" ("Prädikat besonders wertvoll", 2014 "Tarzan")
