= Big Trip 2: Special Delivery =

2022 animated adventure comedy film

- Theatrical release poster
- Directed by: Vasily Rovensky; Natalya Nilova
- Written by: Vasily Ronevsky
- Release dates: September 23, 2022 (South Africa); October 27, 2022 (Russia)
- Running time: 90 minutes
- Country: Russia
- Language: Russian
- Box office: $5.5 million

Big Trip: Special Delivery (Russian: Большое путешествие: Специальная доставка) is a 2022 Russian animated adventure comedy film directed by Vasily Rovensky (who also acted as a writer and producer) and Natalya Nilova. The film is a sequel to The Big Trip. It was released in the UK as Little Bear's Big Trip.

== Plot ==
In the United Forests of America, elections for president start. There are two candidates, John Grizzly and Don Vulture. But the first has no child yet and will be disqualified if no child is presented by Election Day. However he promises that a baby bear is on his way. Vultures and hyenas team up to hinder the delivery of the baby by a stork. Mic-Mic and Oscar are joined by Giant Panda to help a stork deliver the baby despite the plot. They fly to America in their balloon. Doug, a young vulture has been following them and makes a hole in their balloon forcing them land in emergency in a polar zone of snowy icebergs and mountains, from which they gradually reach America. On their way they meet a female bear, Michaela, who helps them deliver the baby on time.

== Original voice cast ==
- Dmitry Nazarov (UK), Pauly Shore (US) as Mic-Mic, an Asiatic black bear
- Maxim Galkin (UK), Jesse McCartney (USA) as Oscar, his hare friend
- Vasily Rovensky Jr. as Giant panda

== Release ==
Lionsgate has acquired US distribution rights.

== Reception ==
Common Sense Media gave the film 2 stars and found it was a "unoriginal animated sequel" while RaisingChildren.net stated, "This movie is action packed and likely to appeal to many children. But you might find the voices annoying. Also the movie's violence and scary scenes means it's best suited to children aged 8 years and older." A review at Dove concluded that "Parents will like the strong bonds of friendship and values such as honor, integrity and taking responsibility of one's actions, as well as shedding a positive light on adoption and caring for life." A very negative review in The Guardian went as far as to write that the film was a "dismal animation only good for punishing kids with." The Herald (Zimbabwe) noted "the political agenda" of the film and found it irrelevant.
