= The Living Forest =

- Theatrical release poster
- Spanish: El bosque animado, sentirás su magia
- Directed by: Ángel de la Cruz; Manolo Gómez
- Written by: Manolo Gómez (script)
- Produced by: Manolo Gómez
- Production companies: Dygra Films; Megatrix
- Distributed by: Buena Vista International
- Release date: 3 August 2001
- Running time: 80 minutes
- Country: Spain
- Language: Spanish
- Box office: $482,902

The Living Forest (Spanish: El bosque animado, sentirás su magia) is a 2001 Spanish animated fantasy film directed by Ángel de la Cruz and Manolo Gómez, based on the novel of the same name by popular Spanish writer Wenceslao Fernández Flórez, with a script by Gómez. The film was released in Spain on 3 August 2001 by Buena Vista International. It won Best Animated Film at the 16th Goya Awards in 2001 and the White Camel award at the Sahara International Film Festival in 2003. The sequel is Spirit of the Forest.
