= The Big Trip =

2019 animated adventure comedy film

- Russian Theatrical Release Poster
- Directed by: Vasily Rovensky; Natalya Nilova
- Written by: Billy Frolick; Vasily Ronevsky
- Produced by: Roman Borisevich; Maxim Rogalsky; Vasily Ronevsky.
- Cinematography: Fedor Mezentsev
- Edited by: Eduard Nuritdinov
- Music by: Igor Babaer; Ivan Uryupin
- Production company: Licensing Brands
- Distributed by: Karoprokat
- Release date: April 27, 2019
- Running time: 80 minutes
- Country: Russia
- Languages: Russian; English
- Budget: $2.9 million
- Box office: $7.2 million

The Big Trip (Russian: Большое путешествие; also released as The Big Trip 3D and Mission: Panda) is a 2019 Russian animated adventure comedy film directed by Vasily Rovensky (who also acted as a writer and producer) and Natalya Nilova. The plot concerns a bear and a hare who must return a baby panda to its rightful parents after a stork mistakenly delivers it to them instead. The film was released in Russia on 27 April 2019, and was a commercial success, but received negative reviews.

== Premise ==
When a stork accidentally delivers a panda cub to the wrong parents, which leads bear Mic-Mic and hare Oscar to take the panda to its rightful parents. Along their journey, they meet several animals.

== Voice cast ==
- Dmitry Nazarov as Mic-Mic the grumpy Asiatic black bear
- Maxim Galkin as Oscar the talkative hare
- Vasily Rovensky Jr. as baby panda
- Philip Kirkorov as Duke the clumsy pelican
- Diomid Vinogradov as Janus the cowardly wolf, Father panda, and a trio of Golden snub-nosed monkeys
- Alexey Vorobyov as Amur the poetic Siberian tiger
- Tatiana Navka as Mother panda
- Irina Kireeva as the red squirrel and duck #1
- Anastasia Reshetnikova as duck #2
- Sergey Smirnov as Carl the stork, mole and Phyton the evil reticulated python
- Vasily Rovensky as the storks and Houston the insane moose

=== English dub cast ===
- Daniel Medvedev as Mic-Mic, Janus, Janus' Fear
  - Pauly Shore as Mic-Mic (redub)
- Stephen Thomas Ochsner as Oscar, Duke
  - Drake Bell as Oscar (redub)
- Timothy John Joseph Sell as Amur
- Bernard Carl Jacobsen as Mr. Panda
- Katherine Marie Rommel as Mrs. Panda
- Brodey Evan Milburn as Python and Houston
- David Andrew Grout as Mole Stevie Rai, Carl
- Jonathan Salway as Cameo Role Characters

== Release ==
The film had its world premiere in Turkey on 12 April 2019, and was released theatrically in Russia on 27 April. It was a commercial success, grossing $2.2 million in Russia and $7.1 million worldwide. The top earning European country was the Netherlands with $1.8 million. The film was released on DVD in the United States by Lionsgate on January 14, 2020, with an English dub featuring Pauly Shore and Drake Bell in the main roles.

== Sequel ==
A sequel, titled Big Trip 2: Special Delivery (also known as Little Bear's Big Trip), was released on 13 October 2021 in Russia. Lionsgate has acquired US distribution rights, and plans to release the film in American theatres in 2022. Pauly Shore reprises his role as Mic-Mic in the Lionsgate dub, while Jesse McCartney replaces Drake Bell as Oscar.
