= Dygra Films =

Dygra Films was a computer animation studio located in A Coruña, Spain, founded in 1987 as a graphic design studio. After producing many interactive CD-ROM titles, they began their work on their first feature-length CG film The Living Forest in 1997 and established the name Dygra Films in 2000.

They have also released computer-animated short films: Taxia, and a trilogy of Mosquis films for Manos Unidas, a charitable organization in Spain.

They closed down in 2012 after claims from underpaid animators.

Founded: 1987, A Coruña, Spain; 37 years ago

Defunct: 2012, 14 years ago

== Feature-length films ==
- The Living Forest (El Bosque animado) — August 3, 2001
- Midsummer Dream (El Sueño de una noche de San Juan) — July 1, 2005
- Spirit of the Forest (Espíritu del bosque) — sequel to The Living Forest — September 12, 2008

=== Scheduled, but unreleased ===
- Holy Night! — est. December 2010
- The Golden Donkey (El Asno de Oro) — 2011
- In Search of Oniria aka Lost & Found (En Busca de Oniria) — est. 2012
