= A Trip to Unicorn Island =

- Directed by: Scott Winn
- Produced by: Andrew Mecham
- Starring: Lilly Singh
- Distributed by: YouTube Premium
- Release date: February 10, 2016
- Countries: United States; Canada
- Language: English

A Trip to Unicorn Island is a 2016 documentary film starring YouTube personality Lilly Singh. The film documents her ambitious 27 city world tour. The film has intakes from her friends and family including famous personalities like Dwayne Johnson, Grace Helbig, Shay Mitchell, Lindsey Stirling, Humble the Poet and more.

The film premiered at the Chinese Theatre in Los Angeles, California and was released on YouTube Premium (formerly known as "YouTube Red") on February 10, 2016, and received mixed reviews from critics. Tom Harrington writing in The Daily Dot called Singh's shtick "creepy": "The first couple of minutes of Unicorn Island move us via Steadicam throughout a suburban family home and finally come to rest downstairs in the small bedroom of Lilly Singh, which is colorfully adorned with posters of heartthrobs such as The Rock. We learn that it is the room in which she becomes her online persona, IISuperwomanII, and sends out her videos on things like "Types of Kids at School," "Types of Teachers at School," and "Types of Crushes" to a population greater than Scotland. Oh, did I mention she's 27?"

The film went on to receive the Streamy Award for Best Feature.

== Awards and nominations ==
| Year | Award Show | Category | Result |
|---|---|---|---|
| 2016 | Streamy Awards | Feature Film | Won |

== See also ==
- How to Be a Bawse: A Guide to Conquering Life
