= A Little Late with Lilly Singh =

American late-night talk show (2019–2021)

- Genre: Late-night talk show
- Created by: Lilly Singh
- Written by: Head writer: Sean O'Conner (2019–2020); Chelsea Davison (2021)
- Directed by: Lilly Singh; Neil Punsalan
- Presented by: Lilly Singh
- Country of origin: United States
- Original language: English
- No. of seasons: 2
- No. of episodes: 177

Production
- Executive producers: Lilly Singh (2019–2021); Polly Auritt (2019–2021); John Irwin (2019–2020); Casey Spira (2019–2020); Sean O'Conner (2019–2020); Sarah Weichel (2019–2020); Neil Punsalan (2021)
- Camera setup: Multi-Camera
- Running time: 22 minutes
- Production companies: Irwin Entertainment (season 1); Unicorn Island Productions; Universal Television

Original release
- Network: NBC
- Release: September 16, 2019 – June 3, 2021

A Little Late with Lilly Singh is an American late-night talk show that was broadcast by NBC. Premiering on September 16, 2019, and hosted by Canadian comedian and internet celebrity Lilly Singh, it succeeded Last Call with Carson Daly as the third and final original program of NBC's late-night lineup, airing at 1:37 a.m. ET/PT.

The show originally used a studio-based format similar to other late-night talk shows, albeit with its episodes being filmed in advance rather than the same day they air, and therefore having a reduced focus on current events. For its second season, the show was retooled with new production staff, and began to be filmed in a Los Angeles home rather than live-to-tape. Singh became the first openly bisexual person, as well as the first person of Indian and South Asian descent, to host an American broadcast major network late-night talk show.

Critics gave it mixed-to-lukewarm reviews, generally praising Singh's energy and stage presence while finding the writing and pre-taped sketches overly scripted and short on a distinct identity, while audience scores ran far lower. A Little Late was canceled by NBC on May 6, 2021, with its final episode airing on June 3, 2021, and its timeslot being given back to affiliates.

== History ==
Last Call with Carson Daly aired on NBC since 2002 as the third and final original program of the network's late-night lineup, behind Late Night and The Tonight Show. It was initially formatted as a studio-based talk show but was later retooled to consist of interview and performance segments filmed on-location. When Daly was announced as the new social media correspondent for Today in 2013, it was stated that Daly would be moving from Last Call to the show. However, Daly would remain as host in a reduced capacity, only providing introductions between the segments. On February 12, 2019, NBC announced that Last Call would conclude after its 2,000th and final episode, with Daly citing his desire to focus on Today, The Voice and other new projects, including a planned series for Golf Channel.

NBC stated that it intended to replace Last Call with a new program. NBC's co-chairman of entertainment George Cheeks intended the timeslot to become a "creative playground" for a personality who could be positioned as a "digital" and "relevancy" play, as opposed to a "ratings play". Chrissy Teigen was suggested as a possibility, but she declined. Former Late Night with Conan O'Brien producer John Irwin suggested YouTube celebrity Lilly Singh — noting her ability to perform both serious interviews and comedic material. The Hollywood Reporter also noted that Singh's experience with online video would also bolster the program's digital presence.

On March 14, 2019, NBC officially announced A Little Late with Lilly Singh. That night, Singh appeared on The Tonight Show Starring Jimmy Fallon to promote the upcoming series. Singh became the first woman among the current generation of late-night hosts on the major broadcast networks, and the first late-night host to ever publicly identify as bisexual. The series was executive produced by Singh and her business partner Polly Auritt (head of development for Singh's studio Unicorn Island Productions), along with John Irwin and others. Aliyah Silverstein was named showrunner.

The show maintained its own YouTube channel, featuring highlights, as well as other web-exclusive content. Cheeks explained that the network did not mind if viewers discovered the series via its YouTube content rather than on TV; clips of segments from late-night talk shows, including Fallon's Tonight Show in particular, have been major draws on YouTube. Singh thought of each episode "[having] a life for the next 24 hours" after their television premiere, and told her writing staff that pitches had to be in the form of "the YouTube video title that's going to work with it".

The network agreed to accommodate Singh's other ventures and entertainment projects, primarily by having her pre-record the first season in advance, as opposed to other late-night programs, where episodes are typically filmed the same day as they are broadcast. The first season of 97 episodes was filmed over a three-month span in late-2019.

Due to this filming schedule, A Little Late was one of the only late-night talk shows to still air studio-based first-run episodes at the onset of the COVID-19 pandemic in the United States. Singh remarked that viewers were raising concerns over the episodes on social media, as they were unaware that they had been filmed "back in 2019 when the only people wearing masks were robbers and Jim Carrey."

On May 13, 2020, NBC renewed the show for a second season. On December 1, 2020, it was announced that season two would premiere on January 11, 2021. Several production changes were made for the second season, including the addition of a new showrunner and writing staff, and having Singh film the program at a home in Los Angeles, rather than a traditional studio set.

On May 6, 2021, NBC announced that A Little Late would end after two seasons, with Singh signing a first-look deal with Universal Television Alternative Studio to produce other new unscripted projects for the company, and NBC opting to "move away" from scheduling original programming in the time slot.

== Format ==
The series featured a mix of interviews, comedy sketches and commentary "rants". In contrast to other late-night talk shows, the first season of A Little Late used an evergreen approach with a larger focus on comedy and Singh's personal experiences, as opposed to topical content such as news satire.

The first season used a studio set similar to other late-night talk shows. For the second season, A Little Late began to use a house in the Los Angeles area as its studio, with a small crew present on-site, and began to increase its use of topical commentaries, with subjects having included new vice president Kamala Harris and the Proud Boys. While the COVID-19 pandemic was cited as having influenced the decision, Singh explained to Deadline Hollywood that she felt uncomfortable in a studio, describing it as a "creative crutch", and the new setting allowed her to give the show a "more inviting and warm casual" feel - including more "behind the scenes" moments - and not having to film the show live-to-tape. Singh also began to write more of her own material for sketches. Of the changes, Singh sarcastically remarked during the season premiere that filming without an audience "sounds a lot like YouTube and I don't know if I have enough experience."

== Broadcast ==
A Little Late premiered on September 16, 2019, featuring actress Mindy Kaling as its first guest. The episode was made available on A Little Late's YouTube channel at 10:00 p.m. ET, in advance of its television premiere. An hour-long primetime special aired on September 18, 2019, following the season 14 finale of America's Got Talent, with guests Christina Aguilera, Tony Hale, Mandy Moore, Kenan Thompson, Milo Ventimiglia and 5 Seconds of Summer. While an expected appearance by Canadian prime minister Justin Trudeau was promoted by NBC, it was cut prior to broadcast.

In Singh's home country of Canada, A Little Late was acquired by Global. It aired as a lead-out for The Late Show with Stephen Colbert — airing an hour earlier (12:35 a.m. ET/PT) in the Eastern and Pacific time zones than its U.S. scheduling.

In February 2021, NBC announced that reruns of A Little Late would be replaced temporarily on Friday nights by airings of Peacock's The Amber Ruffin Show.

The show remained in reruns after its final episode until August 13, 2021; the next Monday, the half-hour was given over to affiliates, either for a repeat of their late local newscasts, other programming or a network-provided replay of the NBC Nightly News.

== Reception ==
The review aggregator website Rotten Tomatoes reported that the first season of A Little Late with Lilly Singh holds an 82% critic approval rating based on eleven reviews, with an average rating of six out of ten. The site's critical consensus reads: "The delightful Lilly Singh breathes fresh air into the world of late-night comedy with an energetic new show that's willing to play with the format in ways that will keep viewers looking forward to staying up A Little Late." Metacritic reports a weighted average score of 62 out of 100, based on four critic reviews, indicating "generally favorable reviews".

The premiere episode attained steady ratings, in comparison to the finale of Last Call. In October 2019, it was reported that the series had an average of 666,000 viewers for the early portion of fall 2019 and a 0.16 rating in adults 18–49 per episode, which were below those of Last Call for the same period (780,000) from a year prior. In May 2020, The Hollywood Reporter characterized the first season's ratings to have been "comparable" to that of Last Call, and that the show led all first-year shows in 2019–20 in online social engagements.

In a positive review, Shirley Li from The Atlantic opined that while Singh's monologues came off as "awkward", she excelled in interviewing the series' guests, during which she delivered "some of her best, off-the-cuff humor." Caroline Framke of Variety also gave the series a positive review and commended Singh as an "engaged interviewer capable of steering the conversation where it needs to go." In addition, the segment "Lilly Is Struggling to Date Women" was nominated for Outstanding Variety or Talk Show Episode at the 31st GLAAD Media Awards. "Lilly Responds to Comments About Her Sexuality" was nominated and won the same award at the 32nd GLAAD Media Awards. The show was also nominated for an MTV Movie & TV Award, for Best Talk/Topical Show, and a Canadian Screen Award, for Singh as host.

=== Awards and nominations ===
Accolades for A Little Late with Lilly Singh
Year	Award Show	Category	Result
2020	8th Canadian Screen Awards	Cogeco Fund Audience Choice Award	Nominated
2020	31st GLAAD Media Awards	Outstanding Variety or Talk Show Episode ("Lilly is Struggling to Date Women")	Nominated
2021	32nd GLAAD Media Awards	Outstanding Variety or Talk Show Episode ("Lilly Responds to Comments About Her Sexuality")	Won
2021	2021 MTV Movie & TV Awards	Best Talk/Topical Show	Nominated

== Episodes ==
=== Season 1: 2019–2020 ===
==== September 2019 ====
No.	Original release date	Guest(s)
1	September 16, 2019	Mindy Kaling, Rainn Wilson
2	September 17, 2019	Kenan Thompson
3	September 18, 2019	Milo Ventimiglia & Mandy Moore, Christina Aguilera
The Primetime Special. Includes in-studio cameos by Kenan Thompson and Tony Hale, a pre-filmed cameo by Chelsea Handler, and musical guests 5 Seconds of Summer.
4	September 18, 2019	Tracee Ellis Ross
5	September 19, 2019	Chelsea Handler
6	September 23, 2019	Jessica Alba
7	September 24, 2019	Elizabeth McGovern, Allen Leech, Hugh Bonneville
8	September 25, 2019	Anna Faris
9	September 26, 2019	Jim Gaffigan, Antoni Porowski
10	September 30, 2019	Barbie Ferreira, Alexa Demie

==== October 2019 ====
No.	Original release date	Guest(s)
11	October 1, 2019	Tegan & Sara, Alexandra Shipp
12	October 2, 2019	Meghan Trainor
13	October 3, 2019	America Ferrera
14	October 7, 2019	Katy Mixon, Titus Burgess
15	October 8, 2019	Natalie Portman
16	October 9, 2019	Kal Penn, Kiran Deol, Moses Storm
17	October 10, 2019	Nikki & Brie Bella
18	October 21, 2019	Paula Abdul, Nicole Scherzinger
19	October 22, 2019	Rosario Dawson, Zoey Deutch
20	October 23, 2019	Justin Hartley, Lea Michele
21	October 24, 2019	Jenna Dewan, Nick Offerman
22	October 31, 2019	David Arquette, Justin Willman

==== November 2019 ====
No.	Original release date	Guest(s)
23	November 4, 2019	Lake Bell, Jason Clarke
24	November 5, 2019	Ewan McGregor, Rebecca Ferguson
25	November 6, 2019	Ashley Graham
26	November 7, 2019	Mackenzie Davis, Natalia Reyes, Diego Boneta, Gabriel Luna
27	November 11, 2019	Adam Devine
28	November 12, 2019	Tyler Perry
29	November 13, 2019	John Cena, Bindi Irwin
30	November 14, 2019	Jenny Slate, Kathryn Hahn
31	November 18, 2019	Constance Wu
32	November 19, 2019	Rainn Wilson, Matteo Lane
33	November 20, 2019	Ginnifer Goodwin, Chase Bernstein
34	November 21, 2019	Tig Notaro, Susan Kelechi Watson
35	November 25, 2019	Thomas Middleditch, Martin Starr, Zach Woods, Amanda Crew
36	November 26, 2019	Jillian Bell, Utkarsh Ambudkar
37	November 27, 2019	Esther Povitsky, Brenda Song
38	November 28, 2019	Snoop Dogg

==== December 2019 ====
No.	Original release date	Guest(s)
39	December 9, 2019	Tony Shalhoub, Ne-Yo
40	December 10, 2019	Thomas Lennon, Aisling Bea
41	December 11, 2019	John Legend
42	December 12, 2019	Deepak Chopra
43	December 16, 2019	Daisy Ridley
44	December 17, 2019	Leslie Odom Jr.
45	December 18, 2019	Malala Yousafzai
46	December 19, 2019	Charlize Theron

==== January 2020 ====
No.	Original release date	Guest(s)
47	January 6, 2020	Russell Peters, Michael Ealy
48	January 7, 2020	Adam Rippon, Iliza Shlesinger
49	January 8, 2020	Rhett & Link
50	January 9, 2020	Brett Gelman, Rosanna Pansino
51	January 13, 2020	Madelaine Petsch, Mena Massoud
52	January 14, 2020	Francia Raisa, Debby Ryan
53	January 15, 2020	Cameron Monaghan, Noel Fisher
54	January 20, 2020	Awkwafina
55	January 21, 2020	RuPaul
56	January 22, 2020	Abigail Spencer, Rodrigo Santoro, Michael Palascak
57	January 23, 2020	Fortune Feimster

==== February 2020 ====
No.	Original release date	Guest(s)
58	February 3, 2020	Ilana Glazer
59	February 4, 2020	D'Arcy Carden, Ali Kolbert
60	February 5, 2020	Wendi McLendon-Covey
61	February 6, 2020	Stephanie Beatriz
62	February 10, 2020	Joseph Gordon-Levitt
63	February 11, 2020	Nico Santos, Sabrina Jalees
64	February 12, 2020	Shan Boodram, Chris Sullivan
65	February 13, 2020	Natasha Leggero, Moshe Kasher
66	February 24, 2020	Lana Condor, Sofia Carson
67	February 25, 2020	Karen Gillan
68	February 26, 2020	Beth Behrs, Tichina Arnold
69	February 27, 2020	Retta

==== March 2020 ====
No.	Original release date	Guest(s)
70	March 2, 2020	Taran Killam
71	March 3, 2020	Erin Moriarty
72	March 4, 2020	Jo Koy, Erinn Hayes
73	March 5, 2020	Jameela Jamil
74	March 9, 2020	Robbie Amell, Stephen Amell, Vanessa Gonzalez
75	March 10, 2020	Chrissy Metz, Marlena Rodriguez
76	March 11, 2020	Rob Corddry, Pete Holmes
77	March 30, 2020	Tyra Banks
78	March 31, 2020	Natalya Neidhart, Paige & Alexa Bliss

==== April 2020 ====
No.	Original release date	Guest(s)
79	April 1, 2020	Terry Crews
80	April 2, 2020	Aisha Tyler, Rob Huebel
81	April 6, 2020	Adam Rippon, Anna Camp
82	April 7, 2020	Adam Rodriguez, Kelsey Cook
83	April 8, 2020	Ron Funches
84	April 9, 2020	Abby Elliott, Adam Pally
85	April 13, 2020	Tan France
86	April 14, 2020	Nikki Glaser
87	April 15, 2020	Lauren Ash, Ben Feldman
88	April 16, 2020	Kevin Nealon
89	April 17, 2020	Reggie Watts
90	April 27, 2020	Sara Foster, Erin Foster
91	April 28, 2020	Jay Shetty, Humble the Poet, Subhah Agarwal
92	April 29, 2020	Adam Conover, Deon Cole
93	April 30, 2020	Phoebe Robinson

==== May 2020 ====
No.	Original release date	Guest(s)
94	May 4, 2020	Phil McGraw
95	May 5, 2020	Larry Wilmore, Quinta Brunson
96	May 6, 2020	Christina Hendricks
97	May 7, 2020	Mark Cuban

=== Season 2: 2021 ===
==== January 2021 ====
No.	Original release date	Guest(s)
1	January 11, 2021	Saweetie
2	January 12, 2021	Brie Larson
3	January 13, 2021	Rainn Wilson
4	January 14, 2021	Stone Cold Steve Austin
5	January 18, 2021	Gitanjali Rao
6	January 19, 2021	Craig Robinson
7	January 20, 2021	Karamo Brown
8	January 21, 2021	Javicia Leslie
9	January 25, 2021	Mike Colter
10	January 26, 2021	Marsai Martin
11	January 27, 2021	Vir Das
12	January 28, 2021	Mary Holland

==== February 2021 ====
No.	Original release date	Guest(s)
13	February 1, 2021	Russ
14	February 2, 2021	Adam Mosseri
15	February 3, 2021	Richfresh
16	February 4, 2021	Alok Vaid-Menon
17	February 8, 2021	Jay Pharoah
18	February 9, 2021	Jagmeet Singh
19	February 10, 2021	Priyanka Chopra
20	February 11, 2021	Taraji P. Henson
21	February 15, 2021	Chris Redd
22	February 16, 2021	Machel Montano
23	February 17, 2021	Patton Oswalt
24	February 18, 2021	Lily Rabe
25	February 22, 2021	Bob the Drag Queen
26	February 23, 2021	Tracee Ellis Ross
27	February 24, 2021	Beth Behrs
28	February 25, 2021	Randall Park

==== March 2021 ====
No.	Original release date	Guest(s)
29	March 1, 2021	Sarah Chalke
30	March 2, 2021	Fortune Feimster
31	March 3, 2021	Alexi Pappas
32	March 4, 2021	Andy Puddicombe
33	March 8, 2021	Elsa Majimbo
34	March 9, 2021	Kathryn Hahn
35	March 10, 2021	Zach King
36	March 11, 2021	Lena Dunham
37	March 15, 2021	M. Night Shyamalan
38	March 16, 2021	Kelly Marie Tran
39	March 17, 2021	Laverne Cox
40	March 18, 2021	Jerry Springer
41	March 22, 2021	Melinda Gates
42	March 23, 2021	Ayesha Curry, Kristina Wong, Eve Torres Gracie
43	March 24, 2021	Whitney Wolfe Herd
44	March 25, 2021	Renee Montgomery

==== April 2021 ====
No.	Original release date	Guest(s)
45	April 5, 2021	Tig Notaro
46	April 6, 2021	Julian Dennison
47	April 7, 2021	Amber Ruffin
48	April 8, 2021	Padma Lakshmi
49	April 12, 2021	RZA
50	April 13, 2021	Maitreyi Ramakrishnan
51	April 14, 2021	Margaret Cho
52	April 15, 2021	Caleb McLaughlin
53	April 19, 2021	Nick Offerman
54	April 20, 2021	Abdullah Saeed
55	April 21, 2021	Teddy Swims
56	April 22, 2021	Brett Chamberlin
57	April 26, 2021	Keke Palmer
58	April 27, 2021	Justin Baldoni
59	April 28, 2021	Yvonne Strahovski
60	April 29, 2021	Rupi Kaur

==== May 2021 ====
No.	Original release date	Guest(s)
61	May 3, 2021	MJ Rodriguez
62	May 4, 2021	Kal Penn
63	May 5, 2021	J. B. Smoove
64	May 6, 2021	Whitney Cummings
65	May 10, 2021	Humble the Poet
66	May 11, 2021	Jimmy Tatro
67	May 12, 2021	Hasan Minhaj
68	May 13, 2021	Natalie Wynn
69	May 17, 2021	Matty Matheson
70	May 18, 2021	A. R. Rahman
71	May 19, 2021	Eitan Bernath
72	May 20, 2021	Jay Shetty
73	May 24, 2021	Nithya Raman
74	May 25, 2021	Ryan O'Connell
75	May 26, 2021	Andrew Rannells
76	May 27, 2021	Payal Kadakia
77	May 31, 2021	Jaren Lewison

==== June 2021 ====
No.	Original release date	Guest(s)
78	June 1, 2021	Wedding Episode
79	June 2, 2021	Tan France
80	June 3, 2021	Season Finale
