= Malvern Community Coalition =

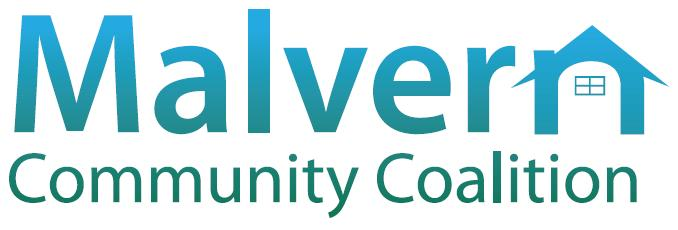
Logo of the Malvern Community Coalition

The Malvern Community Coalition was started in May 2003 following concern about incidents of youth violence in Malvern, Toronto.

The purpose of this Malvern Initiative was to establish a partnership of community members, organizations, companies and leaders to address the issues of youth violence through:

- Understanding the nature and problems of youth violence
- Devising and agreeing to a strategy of proactive and preventative measures
- Committing to actively participating in the implementation of solutions

Participants in the initiative quickly concluded that youth violence was a complex matter that was a symptom of other social and economic issues and that a research study initiated by Vera Taylor, then principal of Lester B. Pearson Collegiate Institute and working with Blessed Mother Teresa Catholic Secondary School and Malvern Family Resource Centre had been conducted in 1996. A copy of the research findings, "Working Together for Malvern", was tracked down, dusted off and reviewed. As well, over the years a number of community organizations had started up, accomplished excellent work in the community but had not survived.

In March 2004, the Malvern Community Coalition was formed.

It evolved out of the Malvern Initiative and recognizes and builds on the work of previous organizations such as the Malvern Community Network. Longtime Malvern community resident, Dr. Anthony Hutchinson, who was presented with the Federal Citation for Citizenship Award in February 2009 by the Government of Canada Department of Citizenship and Immigration Canada, was both an incorporating director of the Malvern Community Coalition as well as a leader of the 2004 Malvern youth-centred MYLIFE Project.
