= 31st GLAAD Media Awards =

Annual US media awards ceremony

- Date: July 30, 2020

The 31st GLAAD Media Awards is the 2020 annual presentation of the GLAAD Media Awards, presented by GLAAD honoring the 2019 media season and held on July 30, 2020. The awards honor films, television shows, musicians and works of journalism that fairly, accurately and inclusively represent the LGBT community and issues relevant to the community. GLAAD announced the 176 nominees split across 30 categories on January 8, 2020, in New York City, New York. The award show was originally scheduled to be held in New York City, hosted by Lilly Singh, on March 19, 2020, with the remaining awards presented in Los Angeles on April 16, 2020. However, the award show was cancelled due to the COVID-19 pandemic. A virtual ceremony aired on GLAAD's Facebook and YouTube channels on July 30, 2020. The ceremony was hosted by Fortune Feimster and Gina Yashere, along with guest appearances from numerous celebrities.

== Ceremony ==
Guest appearances at the virtual ceremony include: Cara Delevingne, Sonya Deville, Kaitlyn Dever, Beanie Feldstein, Jonica T. Gibbs, Dan Levy, Lil Nas X, Lilly Singh, Rachel Maddow, Ryan O’Connell, Dolly Parton, Peppermint, Geena Rocero, Angelica Ross, Benito Skinner, Brian Michael Smith, Gabrielle Union, Dwyane Wade, Lena Waithe, Olivia Wilde, and Raquel Willis. Appearances were also scheduled by the cast and producers of Pose. Chloe x Halle performed. The ceremony was also broadcast on Logo TV on August 3, 2020.

== Winners and nominees ==
Winners are presented in bold.

=== Film ===
| **Outstanding Film – Wide Release**: **Booksmart (United Artists Releasing)**; Bombshell (Lionsgate); Downton Abbey (Focus Features); Judy (Roadside Attractions); Rocketman (Paramount Pictures) | **Outstanding Film – Limited Release**: **Rafiki (Film Movement)**; Adam (Wolfe Releasing); Brittany Runs a Marathon (Amazon Studios); End of the Century (The Cinema Guild); The Heiresses (1844 Entertainment); Kanarie (Breaking Glass Pictures); Pain and Glory (Sony Pictures Classics); Portrait of a Lady on Fire (Neon); Socrates (Breaking Glass Pictures); This Is Not Berlin (Samuel Goldwyn Films) |

=== Television ===
| **Outstanding Comedy Series**: **Schitt's Creek** **(Pop)**; Brooklyn Nine-Nine (NBC); Dear White People (Netflix); Dickinson (Apple TV+); One Day at a Time (Netflix); The Other Two (Comedy Central); Sex Education (Netflix); Superstore (NBC); Vida (Starz); Work in Progress (Showtime) | **Outstanding Drama Series**: **Pose** **(FX)**; Batwoman (The CW); Billions (Showtime); Euphoria (HBO); Killing Eve (BBC America); The L Word: Generation Q (Showtime); The Politician (Netflix); Shadowhunters (Freeform); Star Trek: Discovery (CBS All Access); Supergirl (The CW) |
| **Outstanding Individual Episode** **(in a series without a regular LGBT character)**: **"Two Doors Down" – Dolly Parton's Heartstrings (Netflix)**; "Love" – Drunk History (Comedy Central); "Murdered at a Bad Address" – Law & Order: SVU (NBC); "Spontaneous Combustion" – Easy (Netflix); "This Extraordinary Being" – Watchmen (HBO) | **Outstanding TV Movie**: **Transparent: Musical Finale (Amazon Prime Video)**; Deadwood: The Movie (HBO); Let It Snow (Netflix); Rent: Live (Fox); Trapped: The Alex Cooper Story (Lifetime) |
| **Outstanding Limited Series**: **Tales of the City (Netflix)**; Mrs. Fletcher (HBO); The Red Line (CBS); When They See Us (Netflix); Years and Years (HBO) | **Outstanding Kids & Family Programming**: **The Bravest Knight (Hulu)**; **High School Musical: The Musical: The Series (Disney+)**; Andi Mack (Disney Channel); The Loud House (Nickelodeon); "Mr. Ratburn and the Special Someone" – Arthur (PBS); Rocko's Modern Life: Static Cling (Netflix); She-Ra and the Princesses of Power (Netflix); Steven Universe: The Movie (Cartoon Network); "A Tale of Two Nellas" – Nella the Princess Knight (Nick Jr. Channel); Twelve Forever (Netflix) |
| **Outstanding Documentary**: **State of Pride (YouTube)**; 5B (RYOT); Gay Chorus Deep South (MTV); Leitis in Waiting (PBS); Wig (HBO) | **GLAAD Media Award For Outstanding Reality Program**: **Are You the One? (MTV)**; Bachelor in Paradise (ABC); I Am Jazz (TLC); Queer Eye (Netflix); RuPaul's Drag Race (VH1) |
| **Outstanding Variety or Talk Show Episode**: **"Jonathan Van Ness: Honey, She's An Onion With All Sorts of Layers" – The Late Show with Stephen Colbert (CBS)**; "Billy Porter Serves Cataract Realness, Fashion, and Tonys" – The View (ABC); "Ellen Meets Inspiring Mormon Valedictorian" – The Ellen DeGeneres Show (Syndicated/Telepictures); "Jacob Tobia – Promoting a ‘Gender-Chill’ Exploration of Identity with ‘Sissy’" - The Daily Show with Trevor Noah (Comedy Central); "Lilly Is Struggling to Date Women" – A Little Late with Lilly Singh (NBC) | **Outstanding Scripted Television Series (Spanish-Language)**: **El corazón nunca se equivoca (Univision)**; Amar a muerte (Univision); El juego de las llaves (Amazon Prime Video); Élite (Netflix); Los Espookys (HBO) |

=== Journalism ===
| Award | Nominees |
|---|---|
| Outstanding Digital Journalism Article | **"Trump Administration to LGBT Couples: Your ‘Out of Wedlock’ Kids Aren’t Citizens" by Scott Bixby (The Daily Beast)**; "Finding the Truth About Transgender Athletes in Women's Sports" [series] by Cyd Zeigler, Dawn Ennis (Outsports.com); "How a New Class of Trans Male Actors Are Changing the Face of Television" by Trish Bendix (TIME.com); "'This time is real': Taiwan Counts Down to Asia's First Same-Sex Weddings" by Beh Lih Yi (Openlynews.com); "When Transgender Travelers Walk Into Scanners, Invasive Searches Sometimes Wait on the Other Side" by Lucas Waldron, Brenda Medina (ProPublica) |
| Outstanding Digital Journalism - Multimedia | **"Stonewall 50: The Revolution" produced by Sekiya Dorsett, Brooke Sopelsa, Elizabeth Kuhr, Shahrzad Elghanayan, Wesley Oliver, Tim Fitzsimons (NBC Out and Nightly Films)**; "Between Two Homes: The LGBTQ+ Refugees America Left Behind" by Judah Robinson (NowThis News); "LGBTQ+ Community Debates the Meaning of ‘Queer,’ Military Bans, & More" produced by Ruben Davis, Arielle Duhaime-Ross, Brett Karley, Brendan Kennedy, Brian McGee, James Novogrod, Ani Ucar, Molly Wertheimer, and Brent Whiteside (Vice.com); "The Life Threatening Dangers Of Gay Conversion Therapy" by Grace Baldridge (Refinery29); "MTV News: Sound On – LGBTQ+ Representation" by Terron Moore and Rakhee Jethwa (MTV News) |
| Outstanding TV Journalism Newsmagazine | **"Am I Next? Trans and Targeted" - Nightline**; "ABC News Pride Day" – WABC-TV/ABC News; "All Her Sons" – CBS Sunday Morning; "Am I Next? Gay and Targeted in Chechnya" - Nightline; "Rainbow Railroad" – 60 Minutes |
| Outstanding Newspaper Article | **"Military Reports No Discharges Under Trans Ban – But Advocates Have Doubts" by Chris Johnson (Washington Blade)**; "L.G.B.T.Q. Community Finds ‘Sense of Home’ in the Bronx" by Rick Rojas (The New York Times); "Nearly 4 Million LGBTQ People Live in Rural America, and 'Everything is not bias and awful'" by Susan Miller (USA Today); "Texas Leads the Nation in Transgender Murders. After the Latest Attack, the Dallas Trans Community Asks Why" by Lauren McGaughy (The Dallas Morning News); "Trump Pledged to End the HIV Epidemic. San Francisco Could Get There First" by Maria L. La Ganga (Los Angeles Times) |
| Outstanding Magazine Article | **"The Trans Obituaries Project" by Raquel Willis (Out)**; "2019 Sportsperson of the Year: Megan Rapinoe" by Jenny Vrentas (Sports Illustrated); "In Her Element: Geena Rocero" by Geena Rocero (Playboy); "Indya Moore Just Wants to Be Free" by Jada Yuan (Elle); "Mayor Pete Buttigieg's Unlikely, Untested, Unprecedented Presidential Campaign" by Charlotte Alter (Time) |
| Outstanding Magazine Overall Coverage | **Advocate**; Billboard; Entertainment Weekly; Out; Variety |
| Outstanding TV Journalism Segment | **"One-on-One with Mayor Pete Buttigieg" – The Rachel Maddow Show (MSNBC)**; "Black and Trans in Texas" – Vice News Tonight (HBO); "Don Lemon to Kevin Hart: Walking away right now is your choice" – CNN Tonight with Don Lemon (CNN); "Laverne Cox: We exist, we deserve human rights" – Up with David Gura (MSNBC); "Ryan Russell Reveals His Truth" – ESPN |
| Outstanding Spanish-Language TV Journalism – Newsmagazine | **"Después de Stonewall" – CNN en Español'**; **"Orgullo" – ¡Despierta América! (Univision)**; "Fallece Mujer Transgénero" – Conclusiones (CNN en Español); "Nosotrxs Somos" – RTVE |
| Outstanding Spanish-Language TV Interview | '**"Cómo y Cuándo Salir del Clóset" – Un Nuevo Día (Telemundo)'**; "Conoce la Importancia de Apoyar a un Ser Querido Cuando ‘Sale del Clóset’" - A Primera Hora (Univision 34); "Deportada y Asesinada" – Al Punto (Univision); "Pareja Transgénero Quiere Tener Hijos" – Un Nuevo Día (Telemundo); "Tanya Saracho, Una Latina en Hollywood" – Ojo Crítico (CNN en Español) |
| Outstanding TV Journalism Segment (Spanish-Language) | **"Amor Sin Condición" Noticiero Univision 33 Phoenix (Univision)**; "Exigen Justicia Para Franco" Noticias 22 (MundoFox); "Sabor a Comunidad" Noticiero Telemundo 48 Bay Area (Telemundo); "Ser Latina y Trans en EE.UU. Implica una Lucha Contra la Discriminación en Varios Frentes" Proyecto Ser Humano (CNN en Español); "Triunfa el Amor por Ser Padres" Noticiero Telemundo 44 Washington D.C. (Telemundo) |
| Outstanding Spanish-Language Digital Journalism Article | **"Soy Gay y Estoy Orgulloso de Poder Decirlo: Jorge Luis Martínez, patinador mexicano" por Mario Villagrán GQ México www.gq.com.mx**; "Fue Negligencia de ICE: las Denuncias de Abusos y Discriminación de Mujeres Transgénero Tras Dos Muertes en un Año” por Patricia Clarembaux (Univision.com); "Los Multiples Rostros de la Comunidad Transgénero en Estados Unidos" [series] (Al Día News); "Una Pareja Gay Celebra su Primer Día de Madres, Algo que Pensaron Nunca Sería Posible" por Laura Rodriguez (Hoy); "Queer en la Caravana: el Peligro de Ser Migrante LGBT Buscando Asilo" por Mabel Jiménez (eltecolote.org) |
| Outstanding Spanish-Language Digital Journalism - Video or Multimedia | **"América a Fondo: Brigitte Baptiste, el Rostro de la (bio) Diversidad” por David Casasús (EFE)**; "Conoce a Jorge Luis Martínez Patinador que se Declaró Abiertamente Gay"(quién); "Latinxs Cuentan Qué Es Ser Latinx" (BBC Mundo); "Santuario, el Inesperado Refugio de Indígenas Trans en Colombia" por Alejandro Millán Valencia (BBC Mundo) |

=== Other ===
| Award | Nominees |
|---|---|
| Outstanding Blog | **My Fabulous Disease**; Gays With Kids; JoeMyGod; Pittsburgh Lesbian Correspondents; TransGriot |
| Outstanding Comic Book | **Star Wars: Doctor Aphra (Marvel Comics)**; The Avant-Guards (Boom! Studios); Bloom (First Second); Crowded (Image Comics); Harley Quinn: Breaking Glass (DC Comics); Laura Dean Keeps Breaking Up With Me (First Second); Liebestrasse (ComiXology Originals); Lumberjanes (Boom! Studios); Runaways (Marvel Comics); The Wicked + The Divine (Image Comics) |
| Outstanding Music Artist | **Lil Nas X – 7**; Adam Lambert – Velvet: Side A; Brittany Howard – Jaime; Kevin Abstract – Arizona Baby; Kim Petras – Clarity; King Princess – Cheap Queen; Melissa Etheridge – The Medicine Show; Mika – My Name Is Michael Holbrook; Tegan and Sara – Hey, I'm Just Like You; Young M.A – Herstory in the Making |
| Outstanding Video Game | **The Outer Worlds (Private Division)**; Apex Legends (Electronic Arts); Borderlands 3 (2K Games); Overwatch (Blizzard Entertainment); The Walking Dead: The Final Season (Skybound Entertainment) |
| Outstanding Broadway Production | **The Inheritance by Matthew Lopez**; Choir Boy by Tarell Alvin McCraney; Jagged Little Pill music by Alanis Morissette and Glen Ballard, lyrics by Alanis Morissette, book by Diablo Cody; Slave Play by Jeremy O. Harris; What the Constitution Means to Me by Heidi Schreck |

=== Special Recognition ===
- **Special** (Netflix)
- **Karen Ocamb**, news editor, Los Angeles Blade
- **Mark Segal**, founder and publisher, Philadelphia Gay News
