= I for India (concert) =

2020 benefit livestream event

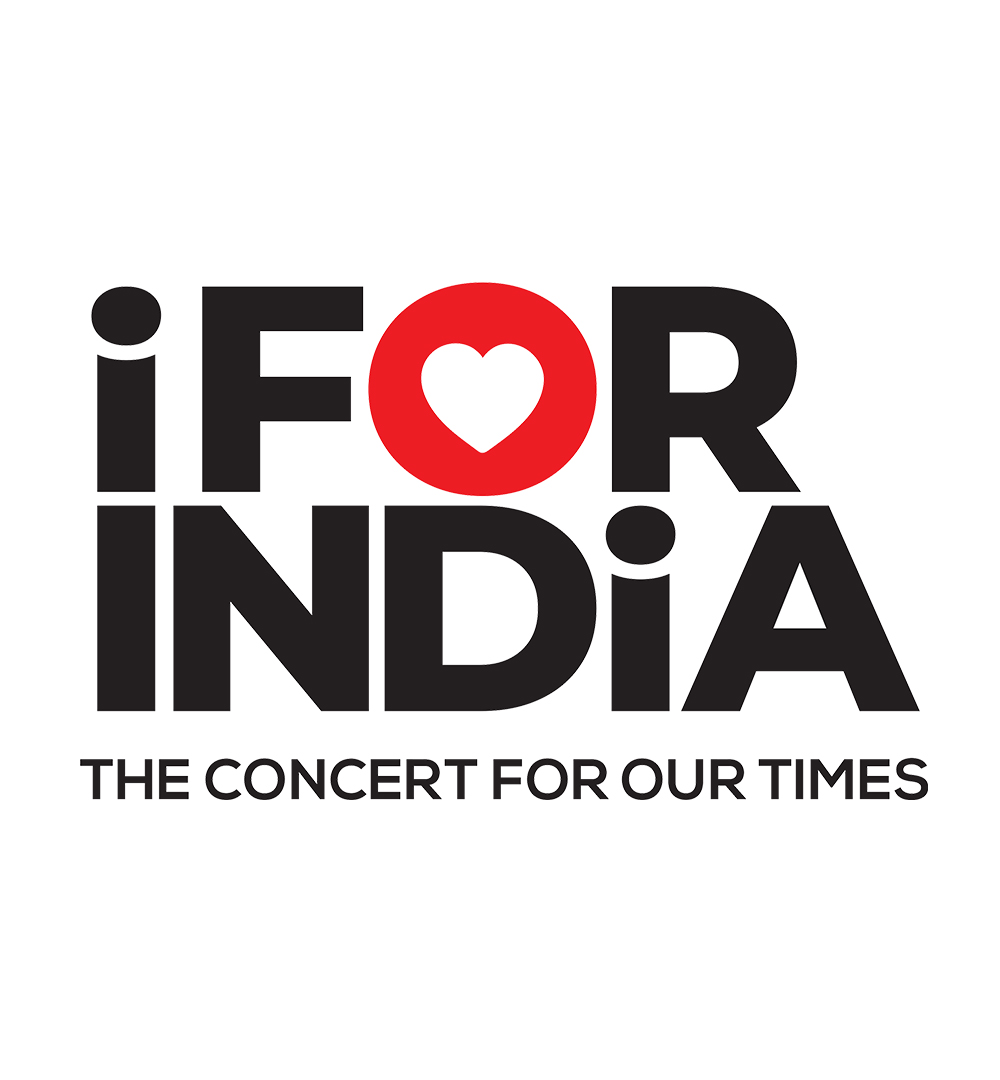
- Also known as: I For India: The Concert for our Times
- Created by: Karan Johar; Zoya Akhtar
- Country of origin: India
- Original languages: English; Hindi

Production
- Production location: Virtual
- Running time: 4 hours
- Production company: Fountainhead MKTG

Original release
- Network: Facebook
- Release: 3 May 2020

I For India: The Concert for our Times, or simply I for India, was a fundraiser concert created by filmmakers Karan Johar and Zoya Akhtar to help raise funds for the India COVID Response Fund (ICRF) managed by GiveIndia. The concert featured some of the biggest actors, musicians, singers, sportspeople and industrialists in India and around the world, coming together to support COVID-19 relief work in India. Produced by Fountainhead MKTG, the concert was live-streamed on Facebook on 3 May 2020 at 7.30pm IST.

The event generated over ₹52 crore (US$5.4 million).

== Overview ==
The concert was announced online by Johar and some of the participating artists on 1 May 2020 on their social media platforms.

The four-hour long concert was streamed live globally on Facebook on Sunday, 3 May 2020 at 7:30pm IST and featured performances and personal messages from 85+ Indian and global stars.

== Participants ==
=== Appearances ===
The following personalities appearing during the show:

- Karan Johar
- Zoya Akhtar
- Akshay Kumar
- Anil Kapoor
- Shabana Azmi
- Arjun Kapoor
- Twinkle Khanna
- Sidharth Malhotra
- Ajay–Atul
- Ustad Zakir Hussain
- Vidya Balan
- Jack Black
- Katrina Kaif
- Kartik Aaryan
- Dia Mirza
- Bhumi Pednekar
- Abhishek Bachchan
- Javed Akhtar
- Nawab vs Ziddi
- Kate Bosworth
- Kapil Sharma
- Dulquer Salmaan
- Kareena Kapoor Khan
- Saif Ali Khan
- Parineeti Chopra
- Priyanka Chopra Jonas
- Joe Jonas
- Sophie Turner
- Virat Kohli
- Anoushka Shankar
- Anushka Sharma
- Mindy Kaling
- Lilly Singh
- Gulzar
- Varun Dhawan
- Russell Peters
- Mick Jagger
- Aishwarya Rai Bachchan
- Kevin Jonas
- Mira Nair
- Amitabh Bachchan
- Vicky Kaushal
- Will Smith
- Aditya Roy Kapur
- Farah Khan
- Hariharan
- Kusha Kapila
- Mame Khan
- Nalandaway Foundation
- Rana Daggubati
- Rani Mukherji
- Rohit Sharma
- Sania Mirza
- Shiamak Davar
- Shillong Chamber Choir
- Shruti Haasan

=== Performances ===
Performers and performances on I For India - The Concert for our Times
Artist(s)	Song(s)
Aamir Khan; Kiran Rao	"Aa Chalke Tujhe Main Leke Chalun" "Jeena Isika Naam Hai"
Shankar–Ehsaan–Loy	"Galla Goodiyan" "Señorita"
Tiger Shroff	"Theher Ja Tu Kisi Bahane Se" "Roop Tera Mastana"
Shreya Ghoshal	"Tujhse Naraz Nahi"
Papon	"Moh Moh Ke Dhaage"
Badshah; Lisa Mishra	"Tareefan" "Genda Phool"
Madhuri Dixit	"Perfect"
Sunidhi Chauhan	"Gun Gu Guna Re"
Jay Sean	"Dance with You (Nachna Tere Naal)"
Raja Kumari	"N.R.I."
Ayushmann Khurrana	"Pani Da Rang" "Mitti Di Khushboo" "Saadi Gali"
Amaan Ali Bangash; Ayaan Ali Bangash; Ustad Amjad Ali Khan	"Ekla Cholo Re" "Raghupati Raghav Raja Ram"
Divine	"Kohinoor"
Harshdeep Kaur	"Ik Onkar" "Kabir"
Rekha Bhardwaj; Vishal Bhardwaj	"O Saathi Re"
A. R. Rahman	"O Aashiqa"
B Praak	"Teri Mitti"
Farhan Akhtar & Band	"Tum Ho Toh"
Nick Jonas	"Jealous"
Diljit Dosanjh	"Ikk Kudi"
Hrithik Roshan	"Tere Jaisa Yaar Kahan"
Parineeti Chopra	"Teri Mitti"
Alia Bhatt; Shaheen Bhatt; Ankur Tewari	"Ikk Kudi" "Dil Hai Ke Manta Nahin"
Pritam; Arijit Singh	"Shayad"
Bryan Adams	"Shine a Light"
Sonu Nigam; Nevaan Nigam	"Tanhai" "Yeh Dil" "Suraj Hua Maddham" "Sugar" "Girls Like You" "Kal Ho Naa Ho"
Ranveer Singh	"Doori"
Shah Rukh Khan	"Sab Sahi Ho Jayega"

== Response ==
The day after the concert went live, it generated over ₹52 crore (US$5.4 million) in funds from online, corporate and philanthropist sources.
