= Malvern, Toronto =

Malvern
- Neighbourhood
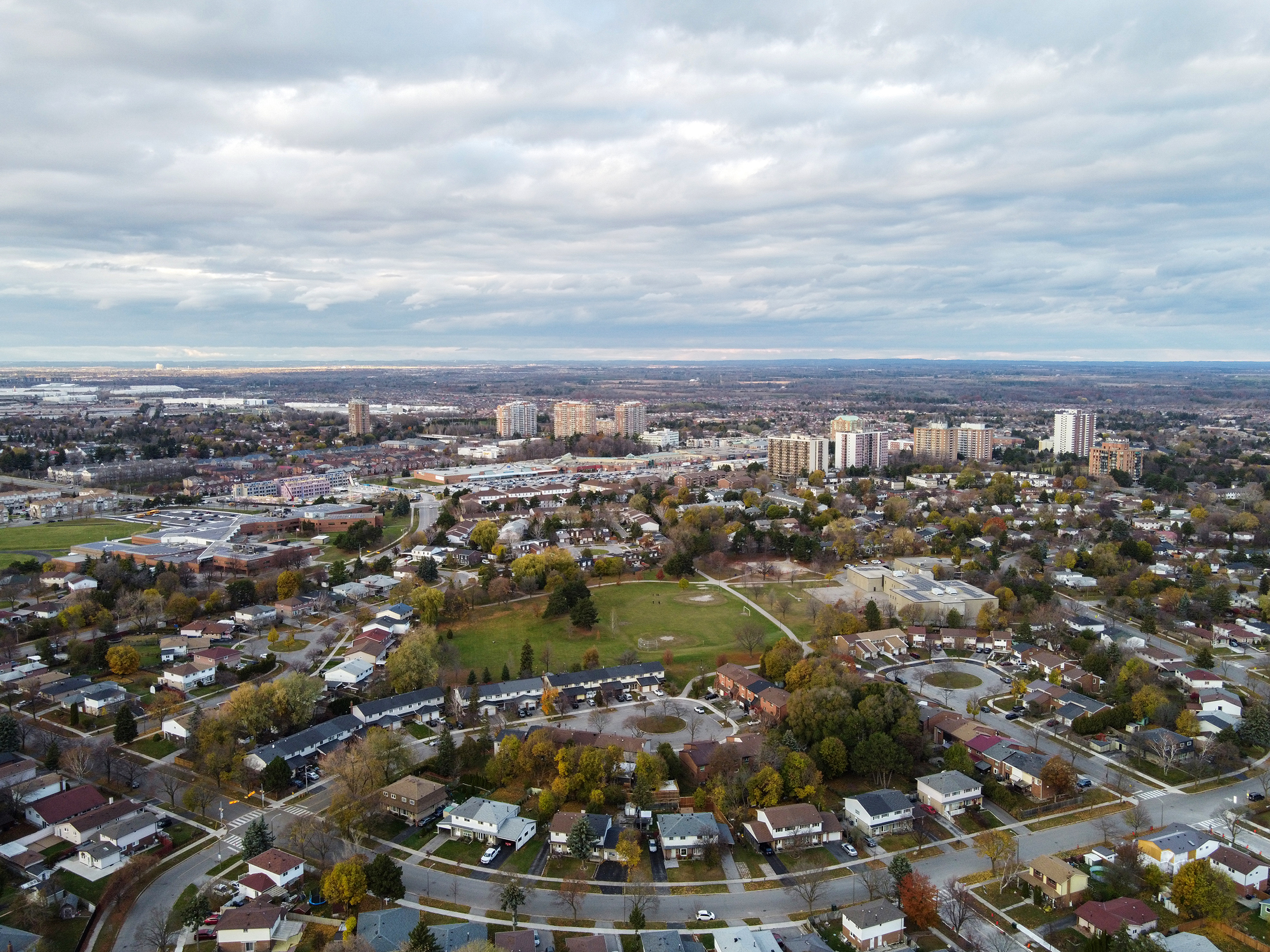
- Aerial view of Malvern in 2023
- Interactive map of Malvern
- Coordinates: 43°48′42″N 79°13′52″W
- Country: Canada
- Province: Ontario
- City: Toronto
- Established: 1850 Scarborough Township
- Village established: 1856 (Postal village)
- Changed municipality: 1998 Toronto from City of Scarborough

Government
  - MP: Gary Anandasangaree (L); Shaun Chen (L)
  - MPP: Raymond Cho (C)
  - Councillor: Neethan Shan

Malvern is a neighbourhood in the city of Toronto, Ontario, Canada, with a population of 44,315. It is located in the northeast corner of the city.

There are over 60 different cultures represented in Malvern, with the most dominant ethnic groups being Caribbean Canadians (mostly Jamaican, Trinidadian, and Guyanese) and South Asian Canadians (mostly Sri Lankan Tamil, Indian, and Pakistani). The neighbourhood has the highest concentration of young people in Canada.

== History ==
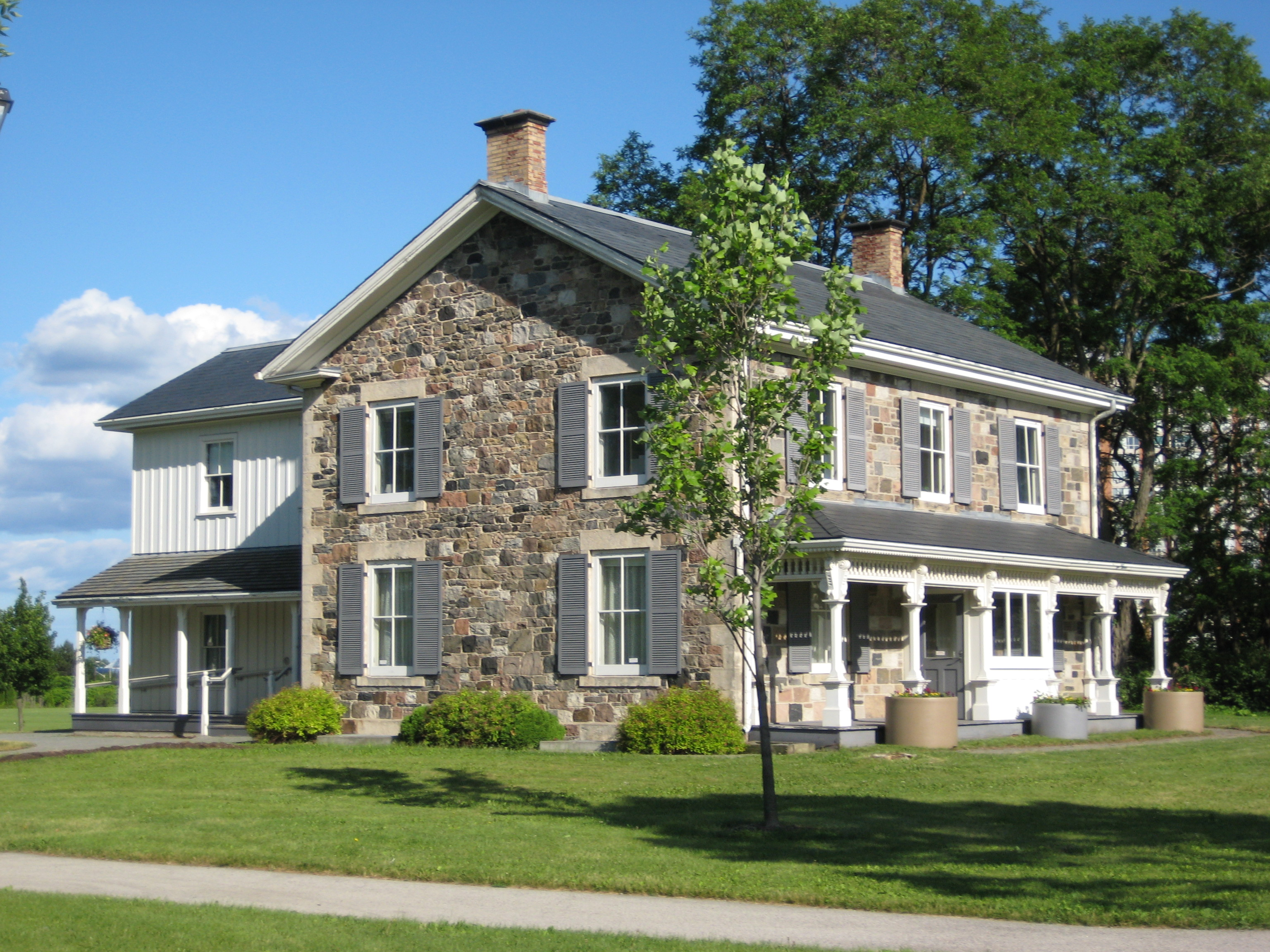
Elderslie House, built in 1864. Malvern was first settled in the mid-1850s.

The history of Malvern began in 1856, when the Malvern Post Office was opened in David Brown's general store, which stood at the south-east corner of Finch Avenue and Markham Road. This post office was named after a resort town in England. A year after the post office was opened, Senator David Reesor — formerly of Markham Village — began selling "Village Lots" in Malvern. Reesor trumpeted Malvern as the future "Capital of Scarborough," anticipating that the Grand Trunk Railway would extend a branch line through here. However, when the Grand Trunk Railway began service to this area in 1871, it bypassed Malvern in favour of the neighbouring village of Agincourt. The village centre and post office had by that time moved south to the corner of today's Sheppard Avenue and Markham Road, which was named Malcolm's Corners at the time. The Malvern Primitive Methodist Church (from 1884 Malvern Methodist and 1925 Malvern United Church) on the east side of Markham Road north of Sheppard, discontinued services in 1969 but the graves in the cemetery remain today in the care of the Toronto United Church Council. The congregation, reorganized and renamed Malvern Emmanuel United Church, was relocated to 25 Sewells Road in the 1980s, until it closed in 2020, and the building razed in January 2021.

While Malvern never did become a prosperous railway centre, it flourished as a farming community for over one hundred years. In the late 1950s, the Canada Mortgage and Housing Corporation expropriated Malvern's farms to build a "model community" of affordable homes. The first residents of this modern day Malvern community moved into their homes in 1972.

The Malvern community has attempted to improve following Project Impact, in which hundreds of police officers from the Greater Toronto Area cracked down on known associates of the "Malvern Crew" street gang, in early morning raids across the city on May 12, 2004. During the raids, 71 warrants were executed resulting in the arrest of 65 people. Further raids, and the implementation of Project Pathfinder would result in arrests of the Malvern Crew's rival gang, the "Galloway Boys", in West Hill. More, less significant raids, continued to take place until the mid-2010s, which helped Malvern's attempt to grow past its bad reputation.

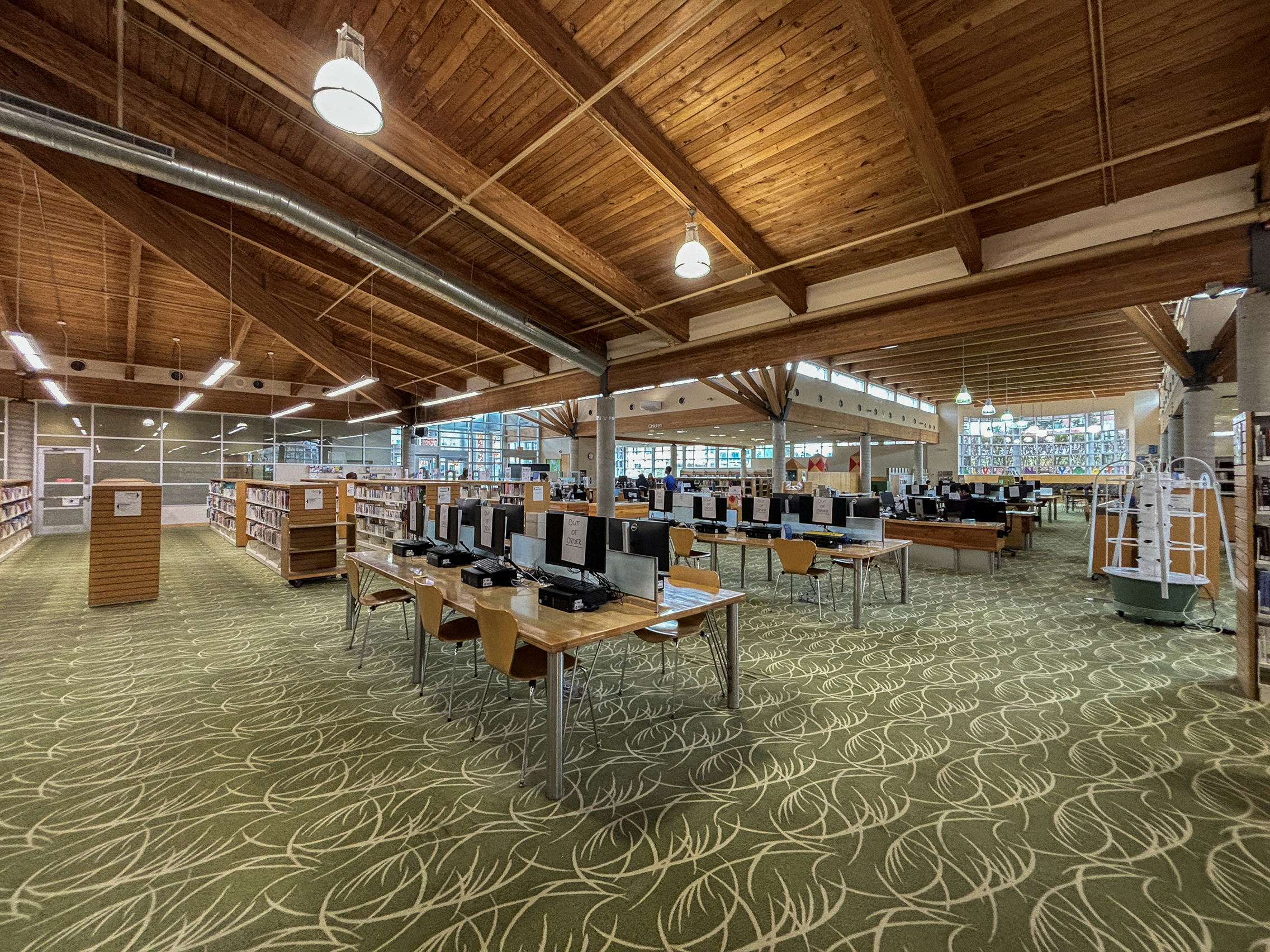
The Malvern branch of the Toronto Public Library was renovated in 2003.

In the early 21st century, the area saw public investment in the community, including a major renovation of the Malvern Branch of the Toronto Public Library, the construction of new housing developments, the opening of a new park in 2004, and the opening of the Nike Malvern Sports Complex in 2006. The Toronto Zoo, Rouge River, and Rouge Valley Park are also located in the vicinity of Malvern, as was Mammoth Hall, a wooden structure that was once a municipal office, meeting hall and curling rink. The Malvern Community Coalition serves as an active incorporated, non-profit, grassroots community organization which exists to promote and enhance the Malvern Community by engaging, empowering, and connecting community, organizations and institutions.

== Education ==
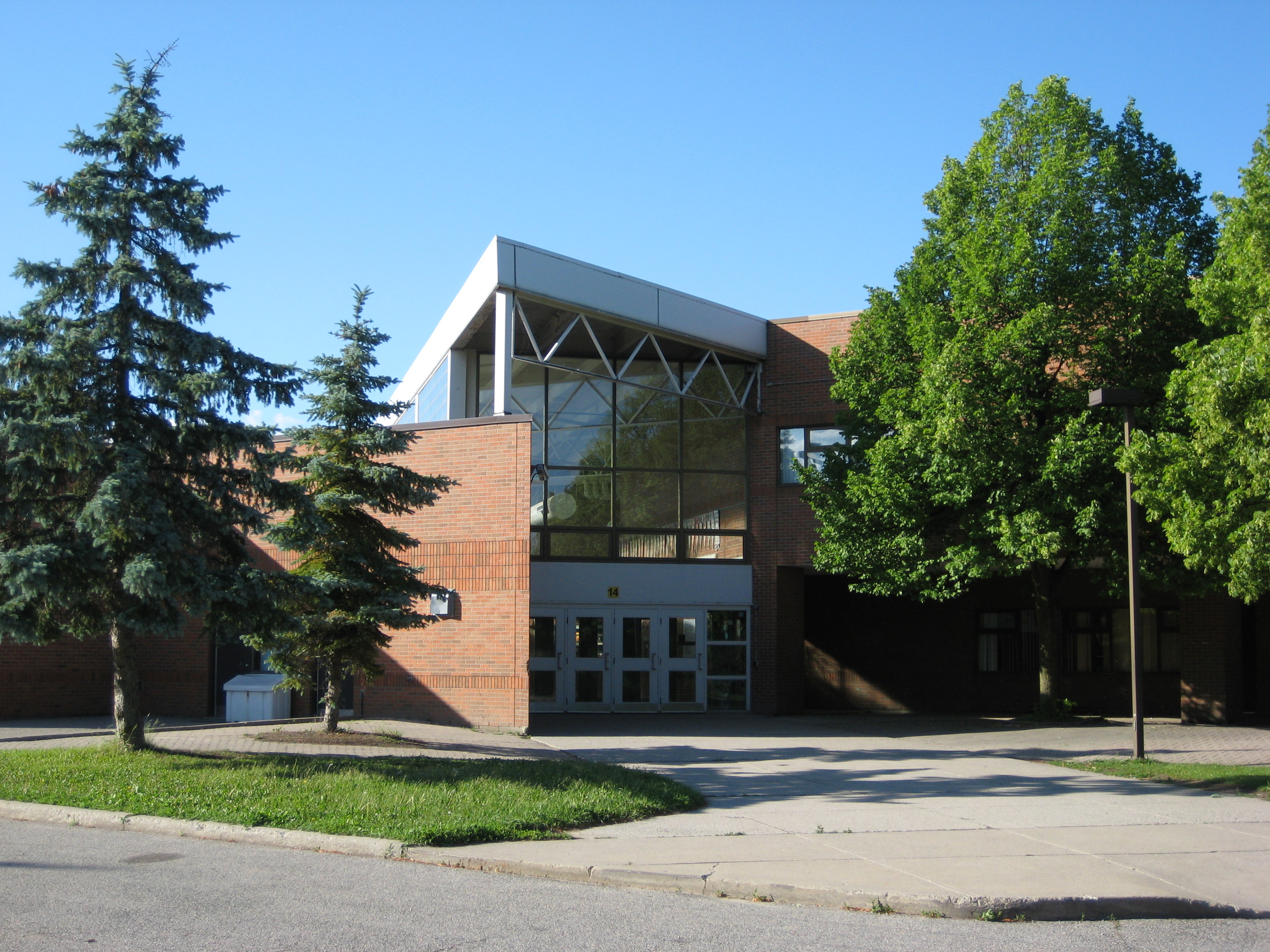
Lester B. Pearson Collegiate Institute is one of two secondary schools in Malvern.

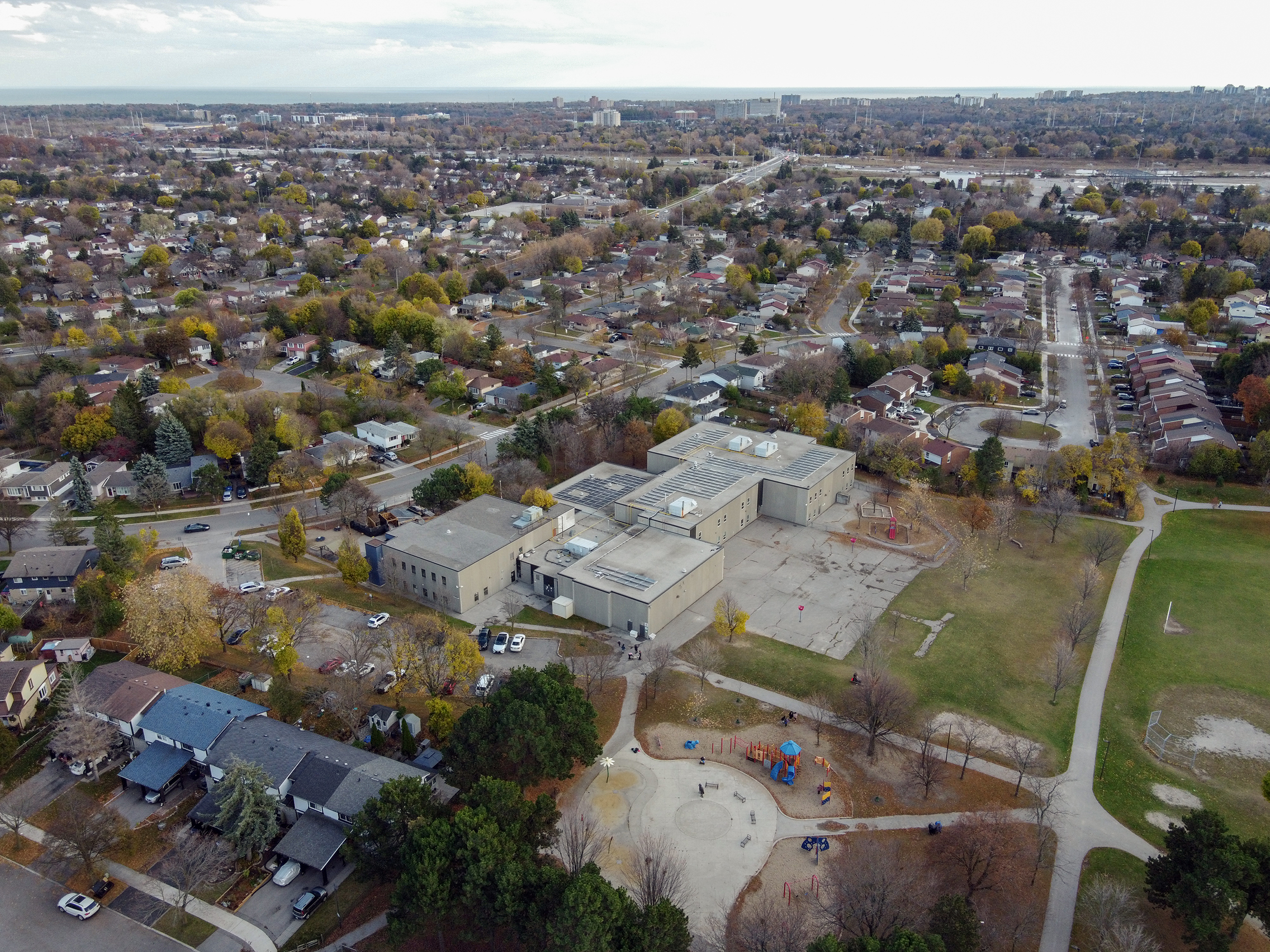
Berner Trail Junior Public School

Two public school boards operate schools in Malvern, the separate Toronto Catholic District School Board (TCDSB), and the secular Toronto District School Board (TDSB).

Both TCDSB and TDSB operate one public secondary school in the neighbourhood. TCDSB operates St. Mother Teresa Catholic Academy, while TDSB operates Lester B. Pearson Collegiate Institute. In addition to secondary schools, both school boards operate several public elementary schools in the Malvern. They include:

- Alexander Stirling Public School (TDSB)
- Berner Trail Junior Public School (TDSB)
- Burrows Hall Junior Public School (TDSB)
- Dr. Marion Hilliard Senior Public School (TDSB)
- Emily Carr Public School (TDSB)
- Fleming Public School (TDSB)
- Grey Owl Junior Public School (TDSB)
- Heritage Park Public School (TDSB)
- Lucy Maud Montgomery Public School (TDSB)
- Malvern Junior Public School (TDSB)
- Mary Shadd Public School (TDSB)
- Sacred Heart Catholic School (TCDSB)
- St. Barnabas Catholic School (TCDSB)
- St. Bede Catholic School (TCDSB)
- St. Columba Catholic School (TCDSB)
- St. Florence Catholic School (TCDSB)
- St. Gabriel Lalemant Catholic School (TCDSB)
- Tom Longboat Junior Public School (TDSB)

The French-first language public secular school board, Conseil scolaire Viamonde, and it separate counterpart, Conseil scolaire catholique MonAvenir also offer schooling to applicable residents of Malvern, although they do not operate a school in the neighbourhood, with CSCM/CSV students attending schools situated in other neighbourhoods in Toronto.

The former S.S. #3 Schoolhouse, serving the Malvern area, built in 1872 stood on 1-acre (4,000 m^{2}) of land purchased from George Pearson, is still standing today at 5810 Finch Avenue East. The building is presently used by a private school, Whitefield Christian Academy.

== Transportation ==
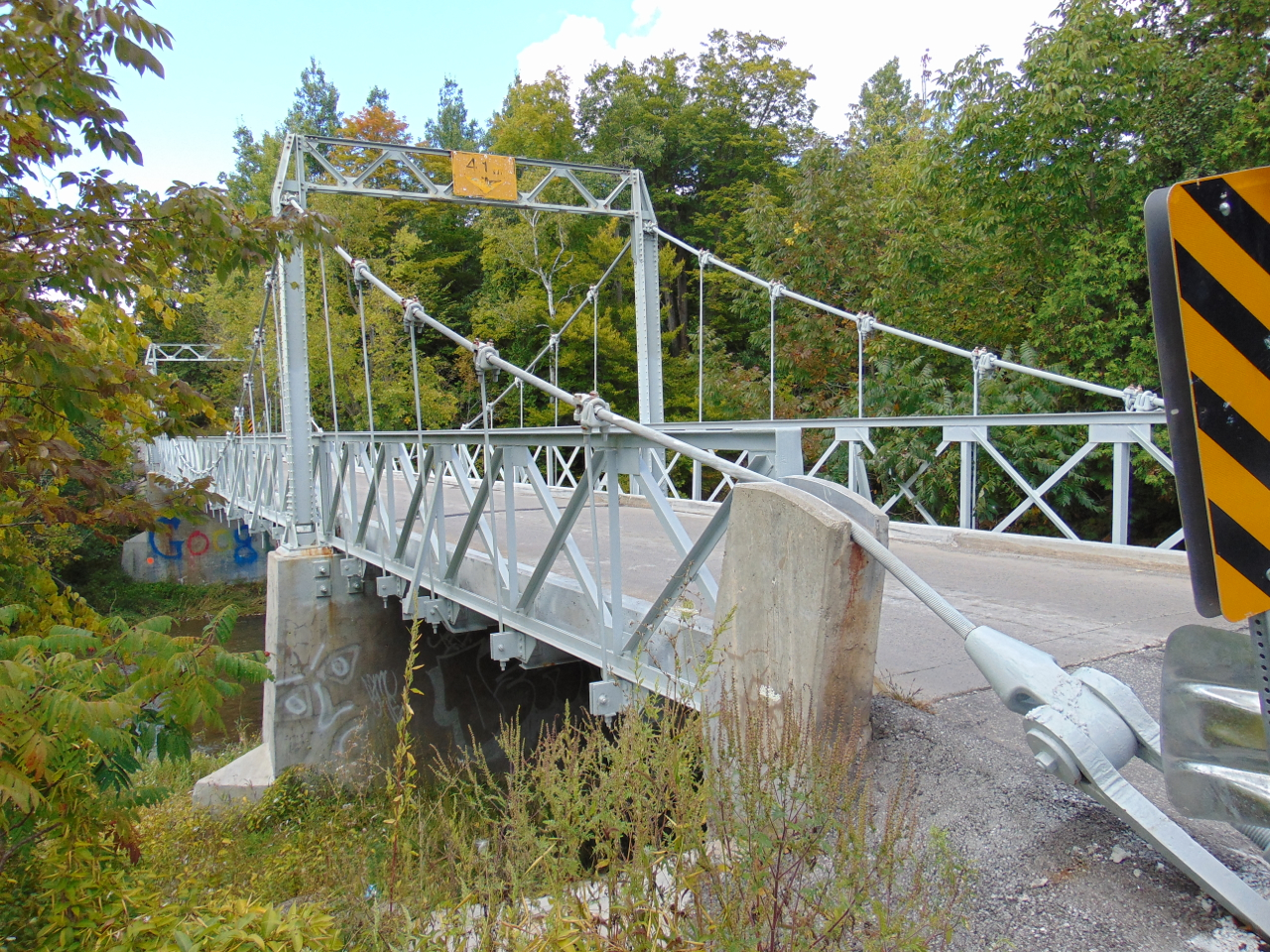
Sewells Road Bridge, in northeast Malvern

Several major roadways are located in Malvern. The neighbourhood is bounded to the south by Highway 401 is a major east–west controlled access highway that passes through Greater Toronto. Several other major roadways include Morningside Avenue and Sheppard Avenue. Located on Sewells Road, the Sewells Road Bridge is a bridge over the Rouge River, in the northeast of Malvern.

=== Public transit ===
Malvern is served by several Toronto Transit Commission (TTC) bus routes (39 Finch East, 85 Sheppard East, 102 Markham Rd, 116 Morningside, 131 Nugget, 132 Milner, 133 Neilson, 134 Progress, 902 Markham Rd Express, 939C Finch Express, and 985B Sheppard East Express). In the 1980s, there was a plan to bring rapid transit to Malvern by extending the Scarborough line, but lack of government funding prevented any extension of the line. In August 2006, city councillors representing Scarborough rallied for the expansion of the Scarborough line, or its possible light rail replacement, to the Malvern community.

==== Scarborough line extension to Malvern ====
Back in 2012, the TTC considered extending the RT from McCowan to Malvern Town Centre. They have also made a motion that the current study should include the addition of a station where the existing line crosses Brimley Road. The proposal is moot now as Line 3 Scarborough RT has been torn down and will get replaced by the extension of Line 2 Bloor–Danforth.

In 2006, a study was completed on the prospects of this line. It recommended upgrading the line to handle larger ART Mark II vehicles, at a cost of $360 million (2006 dollars). Extending the Bloor–Danforth line (either along the current Scarborough RT route, or along a different alignment directly to Scarborough Centre) was not considered cost-effective or justifiable.

On June 15, 2007, the Ontario government had released MoveOntario 2020, a plan that would fund 52 different transit projects throughout Toronto and Hamilton for the cost of $17.5 billion, including the Scarborough RT extension to Sheppard Avenue, which would meet the proposed Sheppard East LRT line, also to be funded by MoveOntario 2020. Unfortunately, in a 2010 budget release, Ontario Premier Dalton McGuinty had chosen to postpone necessary funding for the project.

With the construction of Line 5 Eglinton nearing its end, there have been discussions and studies about either extending this LRT line or constructing a brand new LRT line to Malvern via University of Toronto Scarborough Campus. In May 2023, the city decided to plan a stand-alone light-rail line running from Kennedy station to Malvern via Eglinton Avenue, Kingston Road, Morningside Avenue and Sheppard Avenue. The new line, dubbed the Eglinton East LRT, would mostly follow the route of the previously proposed but cancelled Scarborough Malvern LRT.

==== Scarborough Malvern LRT ====
The Scarborough Malvern LRT line, part of the TTC's Transit City plan, would run for 15 km, estimated to account for 14 million trips in 2021. The southern terminus of the line would be built at Kennedy station at Kennedy Road and Eglinton Avenue, with a connection to the Bloor-Danforth subway, the Scarborough RT, and the Eglinton Crosstown LRT line. The whole line would be built within Scarborough. The line would run along Eglinton Avenue East until it reaches Kingston Road, then continues northeast until Morningside Avenue is reached, then continues north until Sheppard Avenue East, where it turns west, sharing the same tracks and stops as in the Sheppard East LRT line. Finally, the line turns north at Neilson Road, terminating at Malvern Town Centre.

Newly elected Rob Ford cancelled the Malvern LRT shortly after he came to office in 2010.

The Malvern LRT would cross the University of Toronto Scarborough Campus. According to The Varsity, the paper for students at the University of Toronto, when students at the Scarborough campus were asked to contribute $30 million towards the construction of an Olympic class pool on their campus, which would first be used for competitions during the 2015 Pan American Games, they were promised two LRT lines would be brought to campus. The Varsity reported that the students had held up their part of the bargain and resented that the city dropped plans to build the LRT lines.

In May 2023, the city decided to resurrect the Scarborough Malvern LRT proposal but renaming it the Eglinton East LRT.

==== Sheppard East RT ====
Metrolinx is looking into an extension of Line 4 Sheppard to Meadowvale Road along Sheppard Avenue East. This extension would run through southern Malvern.

== Economy ==
=== Malvern Town Centre ===
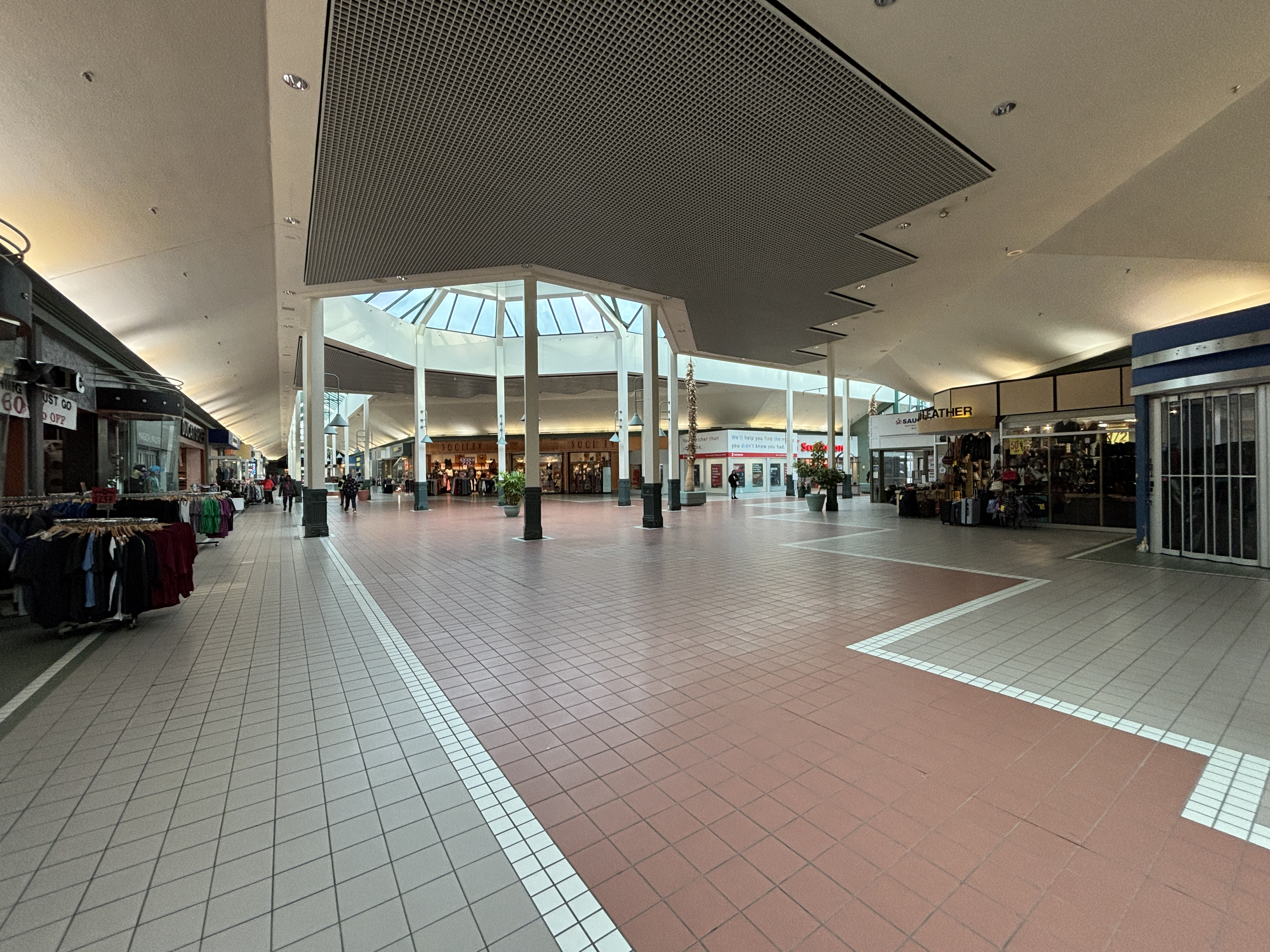
Malvern Town Centre interior, 2023

Although Scarborough Town Centre is a short drive away, Malvern Town Centre provides some retail options and amenities to local residents. Built in the late 1980s, the mall's primary tenants are Freshland Supermarket, an Asian grocery store; Planet Fitness; and Labels, a discount clothing store. There are plans in the works to redevelop the mall and replace it with residential condo towers and green space. The proposed plan would include a new 16,616 square-metre public park immediately abutting the existing forested area.

== Demographics ==
In 2016, the Malvern neighbourhood was home to 43,794 residents. 51% of the population spoke English as their first language, 12.5% spoke Tamil, 6% spoke Tagalog, 5% spoke Urdu, 3.9% spoke Cantonese and 3.6% spoke Gujarati.

Major ethnic populations (2016):

- 39.9% South Asian; 21.3% Indian, 16.3% Sri Lankan or Tamil, 3.2% Pakistani
- 18.9% Black; 9.3% Jamaican, 3.3% Guyanese
- 11% Filipino
- 9.5% White; 4.6% British
- 7.5% Chinese

== Climate ==
Climate data is from Buttonville Municipal Airport located 12.48 km (7.75 mi) west.

Climate data for Markham (Buttonville at Toronto Buttonville Airport) WMO ID: 71639; coordinates 43°51′44″N 79°22′12″W; elevation: 198.1 m (650 ft); 1991–2020 normals, extremes 1895–present (Note: Long term records have been recorded at various climate stations in or nearby Markham since 1895. From 1895 to 1908 at Toronto Agincourt, 1908 to 1918 at Aurora, 1918 to 1959 at Oak Ridges, 1959 to 1986 at Richmond Hill and 1986 to present at Toronto Buttonville Airport)
| Month | Jan | Feb | Mar | Apr | May | Jun | Jul | Aug | Sep | Oct | Nov | Dec | Year |
|---|---|---|---|---|---|---|---|---|---|---|---|---|---|
| Record high humidex | 16.0 | 18.0 | 29.2 | 35.7 | 41.0 | 46.0 | 50.9 | 47.4 | 44.2 | 38.0 | 25.8 | 20.6 | 50.9 |
| Record high °C (°F) | 14.9 (58.8) | 17.3 (63.1) | 26.3 (79.3) | 31.7 (89.1) | 34.6 (94.3) | 36.6 (97.9) | 40.0 (104.0) | 37.8 (100.0) | 35.6 (96.1) | 31.0 (87.8) | 23.8 (74.8) | 20.0 (68.0) | 40.0 (104.0) |
| Mean daily maximum °C (°F) | −1.7 (28.9) | −1.0 (30.2) | 4.6 (40.3) | 11.8 (53.2) | 19.3 (66.7) | 24.6 (76.3) | 27.3 (81.1) | 26.3 (79.3) | 21.9 (71.4) | 14.3 (57.7) | 7.4 (45.3) | 1.5 (34.7) | 13.0 (55.4) |
| Daily mean °C (°F) | −6.0 (21.2) | −5.6 (21.9) | −0.2 (31.6) | 6.5 (43.7) | 13.4 (56.1) | 18.8 (65.8) | 21.5 (70.7) | 20.6 (69.1) | 16.2 (61.2) | 9.4 (48.9) | 3.3 (37.9) | −2.2 (28.0) | 8.0 (46.4) |
| Mean daily minimum °C (°F) | −10.1 (13.8) | −10.1 (13.8) | −5.0 (23.0) | 1.2 (34.2) | 7.4 (45.3) | 13.0 (55.4) | 15.6 (60.1) | 14.8 (58.6) | 10.4 (50.7) | 4.3 (39.7) | −0.8 (30.6) | −5.8 (21.6) | 2.9 (37.2) |
| Record low °C (°F) | −35.2 (−31.4) | −34.4 (−29.9) | −26.1 (−15.0) | −15.6 (3.9) | −5.6 (21.9) | 0.0 (32.0) | 2.2 (36.0) | 1.1 (34.0) | −3.3 (26.1) | −9.4 (15.1) | −20.6 (−5.1) | −33.9 (−29.0) | −35.2 (−31.4) |
| Record low wind chill | −42.6 | −41.7 | −35.6 | −18.6 | −7.9 | 0.0 | 0.0 | 0.0 | −4.2 | −8.8 | −23.9 | −36.6 | −42.6 |
| Average precipitation mm (inches) | 63.5 (2.50) | 51.1 (2.01) | 52.3 (2.06) | 78.9 (3.11) | 80.0 (3.15) | 86.7 (3.41) | 85.2 (3.35) | 71.9 (2.83) | 83.1 (3.27) | 70.6 (2.78) | 76.7 (3.02) | 62.5 (2.46) | 862.4 (33.95) |
| Average rainfall mm (inches) | 27.6 (1.09) | 21.0 (0.83) | 32.8 (1.29) | 71.8 (2.83) | 79.9 (3.15) | 86.7 (3.41) | 85.2 (3.35) | 71.9 (2.83) | 83.1 (3.27) | 70.1 (2.76) | 65.5 (2.58) | 33.4 (1.31) | 728.9 (28.70) |
| Average snowfall cm (inches) | 40.3 (15.9) | 33.9 (13.3) | 19.7 (7.8) | 7.2 (2.8) | 0.1 (0.0) | 0.0 (0.0) | 0.0 (0.0) | 0.0 (0.0) | 0.0 (0.0) | 0.6 (0.2) | 11.7 (4.6) | 32.8 (12.9) | 146.4 (57.6) |
| Average precipitation days (≥ 0.2 mm) | 17.0 | 13.1 | 12.0 | 12.6 | 12.3 | 11.6 | 11.2 | 10.0 | 10.5 | 13.3 | 14.3 | 15.5 | 153.5 |
| Average rainy days (≥ 0.2 mm) | 5.5 | 3.7 | 6.5 | 11.2 | 12.3 | 11.6 | 11.2 | 10.0 | 10.5 | 13.2 | 10.9 | 6.8 | 113.4 |
| Average snowy days (≥ 0.2 cm) | 14.2 | 11.0 | 7.2 | 2.8 | 0.13 | 0.0 | 0.0 | 0.0 | 0.0 | 0.42 | 4.8 | 10.6 | 51.1 |
| Average relative humidity (%) (at 1500 LST) | 68.3 | 63.5 | 57.7 | 52.9 | 52.8 | 53.9 | 52.9 | 55.2 | 57.6 | 62.1 | 66.8 | 70.4 | 59.5 |
Source: Environment and Climate Change Canada

== Notable residents ==
- Kamal Miller, Canadian international soccer player
- Lilly Singh, YouTuber and author, known by her username IISuperwomanII
