= Lester B. Pearson Collegiate Institute =

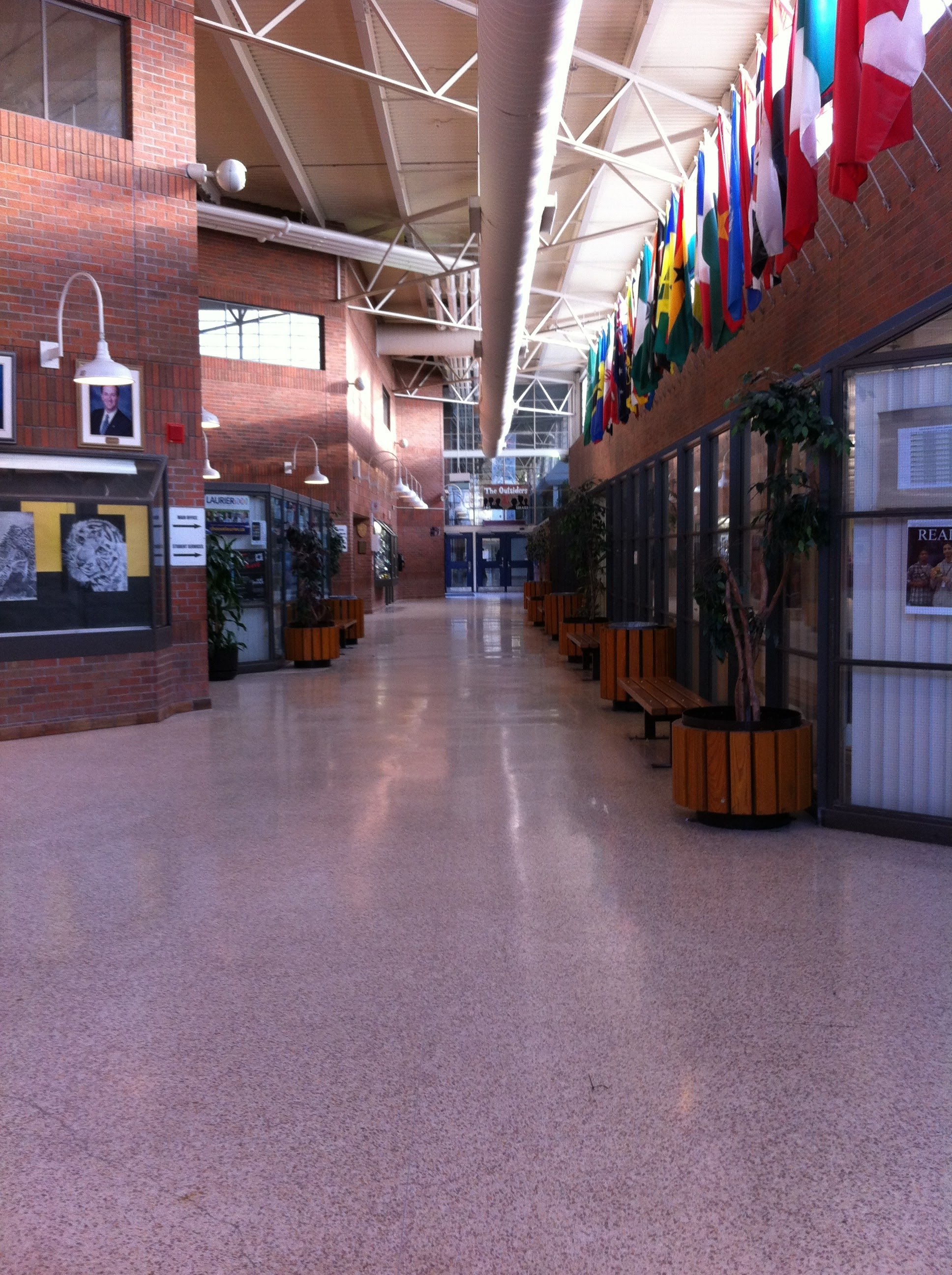
- Interior of the entrance hall of Lester B. Pearson C.I.

Location
- 150 Tapscott Road; Toronto, Ontario, M1B 2L2; Canada; 43°48′11″N 79°13′33″W

Information
- School type: High school
- Motto: Peace Through Understanding
- Religious affiliation: Secular
- Founded: 1978
- School board: Toronto District School Board (Scarborough Board of Education)
- Superintendent: Elizabeth Addo
- School number: 4134 / 922498
- Principal: Mira Nam-Wong
- Grades: 9–12
- Enrolment: 1327 (2014–15)
- Language: Canadian English
- Colours: Black, white, silver and orange
- Team name: Pearson Bengals
- Website: schools.tdsb.on.ca/lesterbpearson/
- Last updated: May 3, 2016

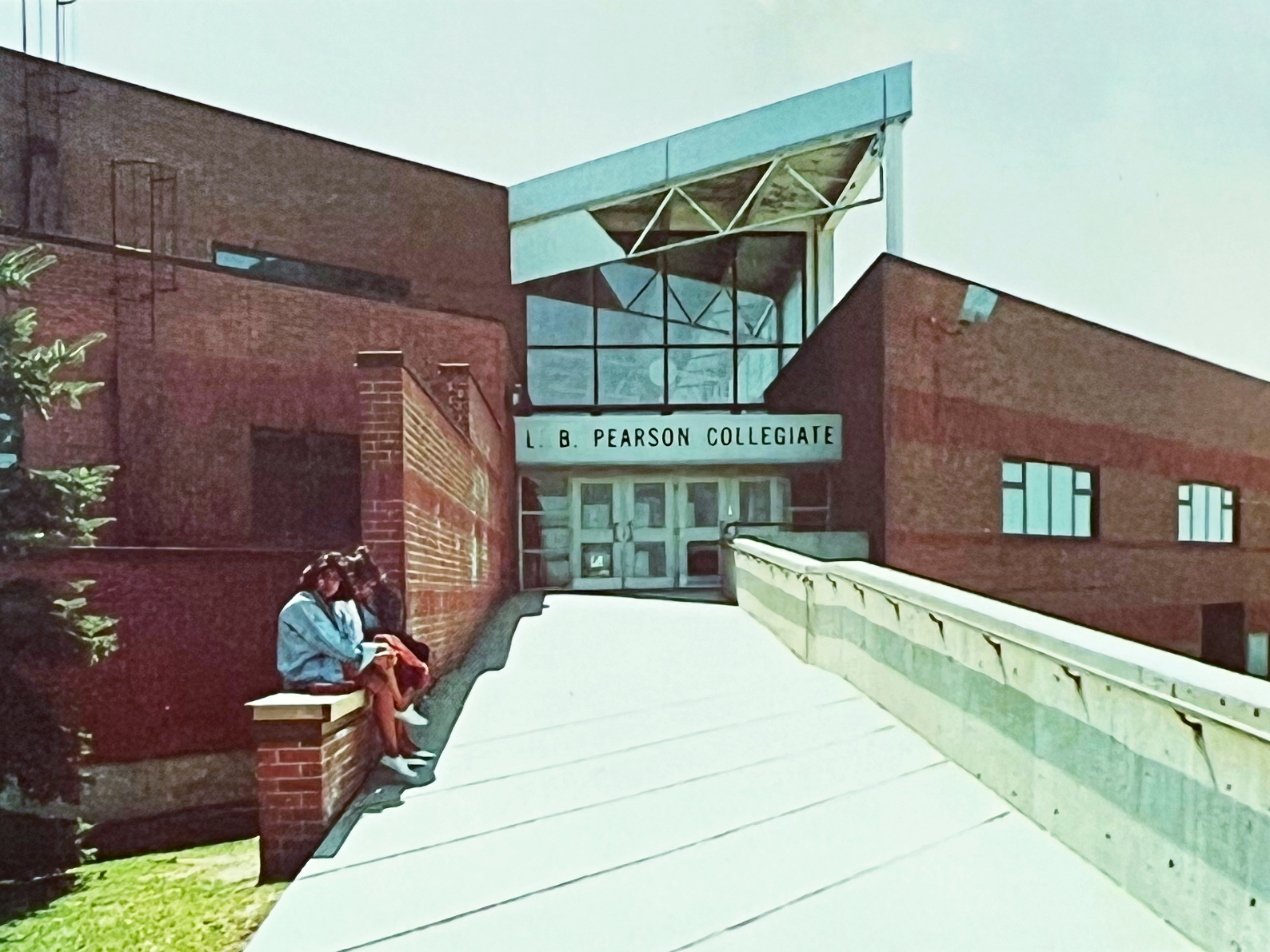
The "Ramp" has become an important part of Pearson CI culture.

Lester B. Pearson Collegiate Institute is a public high school in the Malvern neighbourhood of Toronto, Ontario, Canada.

The school operates grades 9 through 12 under the sanction of the Toronto District School Board. Opened in 1978, it formerly was part of the Scarborough Board of Education.

== Overview ==
Pearson CI is located at 150 Tapscott Road. It is located across from Malvern Town Centre and can be easily accessed by various TTC bus routes. LBP is a school with a multicultural group of students coming from 56 different countries, speaking 42 languages, and practicing 17 different religions.

The school is named after Canadian Prime Minister Lester B. Pearson, who was Canada's only winner of the Nobel Peace Prize. The school's motto is "Peace through Understanding," which is from Pearson's 1957 Nobel speech, and attempts to inspire appreciation of diversity. This motto is featured on the school's logo in which stylized human figures in the outside circle have outstretched arms, symbolizing understanding among the nations of the world. The circular shape represents the world, and contains the dove of peace and Canada's maple leaf.

== Design ==
Lester B. Pearson Collegiate Institute was designed by Raymond Moriyama, a renowned Toronto architect, whose many notable projects include the Ontario Science Centre and Toronto Reference Library.

Key features of the original design have become an important part of the school culture including "The Ramp," the wide main entrance ramp that leads into "Main Street," a lane that leads to the learning areas, a student gathering place called "The Caf or Cafetorium," and ends at a senior public school (Dr. Marion Hilliard Senior Public School).

== History ==
The school opened its doors to students in October 1978. For the first several weeks of that school year, Pearson CI students were bussed to nearby Albert Campbell CI at McCowan and Finch because of construction delays due to a province-wide strike of carpenters. The previous year, Pearson's first cohort of students, including students who would be attending the adjoining Hilliard Senior Public School, was bussed to West Hill Collegiate Institute for classes.

In 1978, the junior boys' basketball team, which included Farley Flex and Darryl Sampson, won the Scarborough Championship, the first time in 46 years that a brand-new school won the championship. They won three consecutive basketball championships.

== Incidents ==
- On February 5, 1999, a man shot a spectator at a talent show with 300-400 people also watching at Lester B. Pearson Collegiate Institute. The victim, Dwayne Williams, fortunately survived the incident. None of the spectators nor the 400 other people co-operated with police.
- On March 7, 2000, a student was sent to hospital with non-life threatening injuries after being shot in the back of the head with a pellet gun at the school.
- During the 2005-2006 school year, Lester B. Pearson CI went into a full lockdown due to an external incident.
- On May 28, 2008, Lester B. Pearson CI was put into lockdown after a man was shot and killed just outside a neighbouring high school (Mother Teresa Catholic Secondary School).
- On May 26, 2014, Lester B. Pearson CI was put into lockdown after a shooting occurred across the street at the Malvern Town Centre strip mall.
- On April 29, 2015, Lester B. Pearson CI was put into a hold and secure after a teen was shot a few minutes away (on Empringham Drive).
- On May 28, 2018, a university student was shot and killed near the school in the middle of the night. The school was closed the next day, while police investigated.
- On January 14, 2020, Lester B. Pearson CI was put into lockdown due to a shooting across the street at the Malvern Town Centre strip mall.

== Notable alumni ==
- Farley Flex (class of 1981) – a judge on Canadian Idol, the first manager of Maestro Fresh Wes, and instrumental in founding FLOW 93.5, Canada's first urban music radio station
- Darryl Sampson (class of 1982) – professional football player with Winnipeg Blue Bombers, Grey Cup Champion (1988, 1990) and CFL All-Star (1993); coach (York U, Blue Bombers); and inductee to the Winnipeg Blue Bombers Hall Of Fame (2004) and Manitoba Hall Of Fame (2015)
- Maurice Dean Wint (class of 1983) – professional actor on stage, screen, television and radio
- Wes Hall (class of 1988) – entrepreneur and philanthropist; first Black investor on CBC's Dragon's Den; author of No Bootstraps When You're Barefoot
- Lilly Singh (class of 2006) – YouTube personality and host of A Little Late with Lilly Singh
- Tracy Schmitt (class of 1988) – commonly referred to as "Unstoppable Tracy"
- Becky Yuan (class of 1992) - endurance athlete in 2022 swam across Lake Erie from Sturgeon Point, USA to Crystal Beach, Canada.

== Programs ==
=== Specialist High Skills Major: Health and Wellness ===
Lester B. Pearson's newest program is the Health and Wellness Specialist High Skills Major (SHSM). It is a new initiative from the Ministry of Education. This program allows students to acquire technical knowledge and skills that will assist them in entering a future career of their choice. Pearson students will receive recognition on their high school diploma and a set of industry-recognized certification. This program is recognized by colleges, universities, and employers.

== See also ==
- Education in Ontario
- List of secondary schools in Ontario
