= Elsa Majimbo =

Kenyan comedienne (born 2001)

- Born: 29 June 2001 (age 24); Nairobi, Kenya
- Occupation: Comedian
- Years active: 2020 – present

Elsa Majimbo (born June 29, 2001) is a Kenyan comedian from Nairobi. Her satirical monologues usually feature her eating potato chips, leaning back to a pillow and using a pair of tiny 1990's sunglasses as a prop.

Majimbo gained recognition in early 2020 during the COVID-19 quarantine period by making home-based comedy videos. In February 2021, she partnered with luxury brand Valentino. By the end of that year, she had received endorsements from both Fenty and MAC.

== Career and education ==
Elsa was a student of journalism from Strathmore University, Nairobi. Her monologue videos went viral during the COVID-19 lockdown.

== Chess career ==
Majimbo is a chess player and she has participated in chess tournaments in the past. However, she has not embarked on a professional chess career and she is not rated by FIDE. In 2017 she played in the Kenya National Youth Chess Championship Finals – U16 Girls and scored fourth. She also participated in school chess tournaments such as Alliance High Open Chess Tournament – 2017. At that tournament there were 6 competitors in the women section. Elsa finished second jointly with four other female players.

In early 2021, Majimbo appeared in a Netflix video clip claiming to be a 15-time chess champion. However, this was a public stunt and meant to be humour (or parody) as she also posed like the main character in the promotional poster of the Netflix TV series; The Queen's Gambit in a related photo.

== Recognition ==
Her monologues were featured on Comedy Central several times in June 2020, and have been called out and applauded by Naomi Campbell, Lupita Nyong’o, Joan Smalls, Miss Universe, Anderson Cooper, Zozibini Tunzi, Snoop Dogg and Cassper Nyovest. She is also an ambassador for MAC Cosmetics. In the most recent development, Majimbo has bagged an ambassadorial role with Rihanna's Fenty where she showcases the brand's glasses in every shade. She won the People's Choice Award for Favorite African Social Star in 2020.

At the 2020 Streamy Awards, YouTuber Lilly Singh presented Majimbo with her "Creator Honor" award. Singh praised Majimbo's comedy style, calling her an icon and revealing that Majimbo helped her laugh throughout 2020.

In January 2022, Majimbo appeared on Steve on Watch, a Facebook web TV talk show hosted by Steve Harvey where she talked about her life and more specifically her career in comedy.
