= How to Be a Bawse =

Book by Lilly Singh

How to Be a Bawse: A Guide to Conquering Life
- First edition
- Author: Lilly Singh
- Language: English
- Genre: Autobiography; humor; biography; memoir
- Published: March 28, 2017
- Publisher: Doubleday (Canada); Ballantine Books (US); Penguin Books (UK)
- Publication place: Canada
- ISBN: 9780425286463
- Website: Book Website

How to Be a Bawse: A Guide to Conquering Life is a book by YouTube personality Lilly Singh released on March 28, 2017.

Her book is a New York Times bestseller. A successor book, titled Be A Triangle was released on April 5, 2022.

== Release ==
In March 2017, Singh announced via YouTube that she would embark on a worldwide book tour called the #BawseBook Tour. The tour revolved around her book and its key concepts. The tour began in New York City in March and concluded in Singapore in May 2017.

== Awards and nominations ==
Year	Award	Category	Nominee	Result
2017	Goodreads Choice Awards	Best Non-Fiction	How To Be A Bawse: A Guide to Conquering Life	Won

== See also ==
- A Trip to Unicorn Island
