= Lilly Singh =

Canadian YouTuber and actress (born 1988)

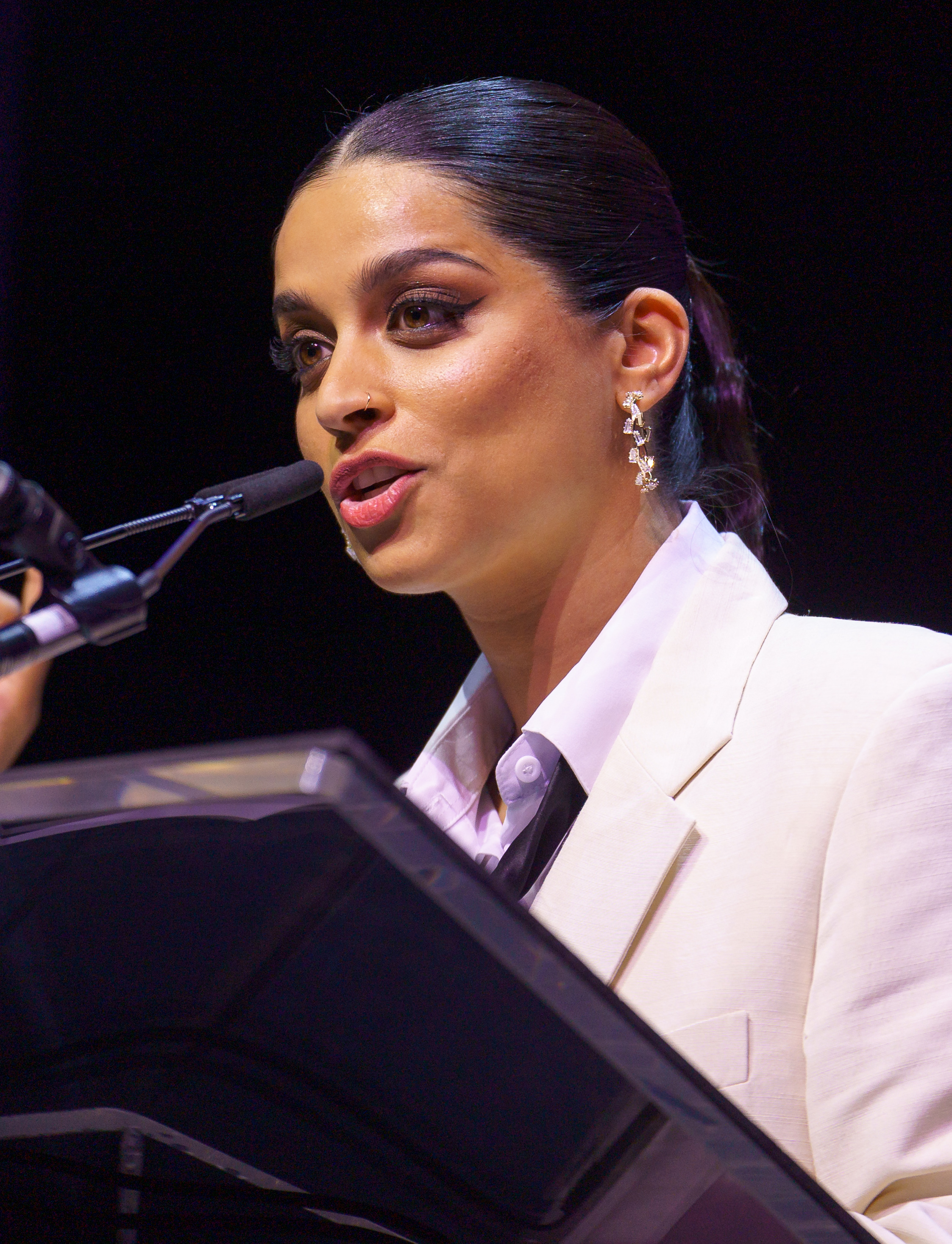
- Singh in 2024
- Born: September 26, 1988 (age 38); Scarborough, Ontario, Canada
- Education: York University (BA)
- Occupations: YouTuber; TV host; actress; comedian; author

YouTube information
- Channel: Lilly Singh
- Genres: Vlogs; skits; rants; motivation
- Subscribers: 14.1 million
- Views: 3.58 billion
- Last updated: November 11, 2026
- Website: lillysingh.com

Lilly Singh (born September 26, 1988) is a Canadian-American YouTuber, actress, television host, and comedian. She began making YouTube videos in 2010, initially under the pseudonym Superwoman (stylized IISuperwomanII), which she used as her username until 2019.

Singh released her documentary A Trip to Unicorn Island (2016) and her first book How to Be a Bawse: A Guide to Conquering Life (2017), which was a New York Times Best Seller. From September 2019 to June 2021, Singh acted as executive producer and host of the NBC late-night talk show A Little Late with Lilly Singh. She is the first person of Indian descent to host an American late-night talk show. Singh has since gone on to voice Tiffany Fluffit in DreamWorks Animation's The Bad Guys film franchise (2022–present).

== Early life and education ==
Singh was born and raised in the Scarborough district of Toronto, Ontario, Canada. Her parents, Malvindar Kaur and Sukvindar Singh, are Indian Punjabi immigrants from Hoshiarpur, Punjab, India and raised her as a Sikh. Singh's older sister, Tina (born 1982), is also a YouTuber; she makes videos about her family life with her husband and their three sons, under the name 'The Tina Singh' (formerly 'MOM BOSS OF 3'). Singh had said she was a tomboy as a child. She attended Mary Shadd Public School during her elementary years, and in 2006 she graduated from Lester B. Pearson Collegiate Institute in Malvern, Toronto. She was also a member of Girl Guides of Canada and participated in their youth programs. In 2010, she graduated from York University in Toronto with a Bachelor of Arts in psychology.

== Career ==
=== YouTube channel and breakthrough (2010–2014) ===
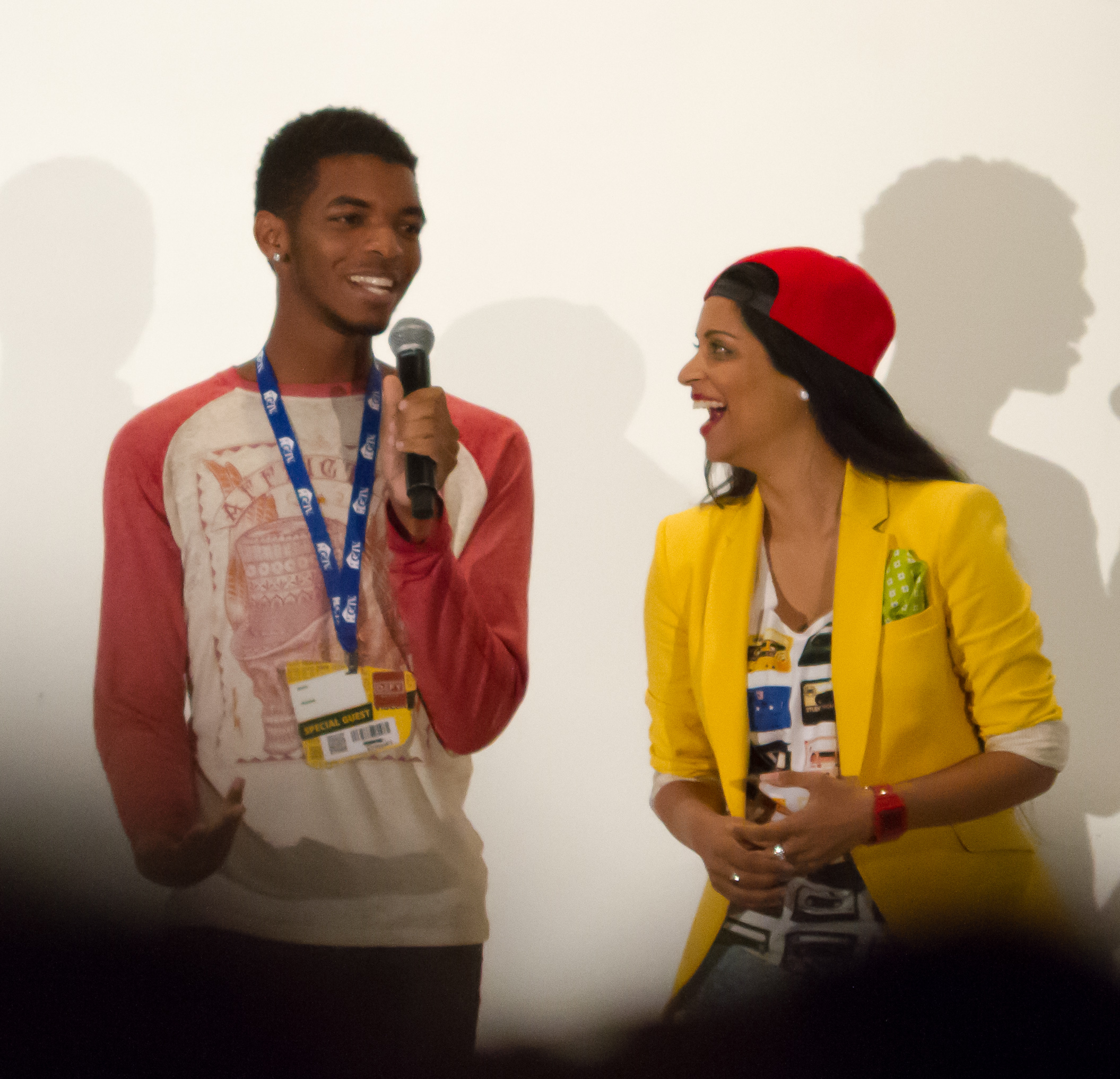
Singh and YouTuber Kingsley at VidCon 2014

In October 2010, Singh started a YouTube channel under the pseudonym "IISuperwomanII". Starting out, she had intended to go to graduate school as her parents had requested, but she instead chose to make YouTube videos and decided that she would return to graduate school if her YouTube career did not progress. In December 2011, Singh created a second channel called "SuperwomanVlogs", now titled "Lilly Singh Vlogs", where she chronicles her daily activities and includes behind the scenes footage from her videos. She used it as a second channel to upload videos until August 2014, when she began uploading vlogs. When Singh acquired 100,000 subscribers in 2012 she applied to YouTube for monetization on her videos. When YouTube accepted, Singh "became more career-minded" and bought her first camera for $699.

In August 2013, Singh was featured alongside Jassi Sidhu in his Punjabi song Hipshaker. She rapped in the song Mauj Ki Malharein, which played in the Bollywood drama Gulaab Gang in August 2014. In July of the same year, Singh released a song titled #LEH in a collaboration with her friend, author and rapper Kanwer Singh, who is known by the pseudonym "Humble the Poet". In 2014, Singh appeared in a small role in the Canadian production Dr. Cabbie. In the same year, she was nominated for a Shorty Award and a Streamy Award.

In 2015, Singh ranked 8th on Forbes' list of World's Top-Earning YouTube Stars. In 2016, she was included in Forbes list of world's highest paid YouTubers ranking third and earning a reported $7.5 million. In 2018, she was once again ranked on the Forbes list of the world's highest-paid YouTube stars, in tenth place, earning a reported $10.5 million. As of February 2022 she has 14.7 million subscribers and over three billion video views.

=== Career expansion (2015–2018) ===
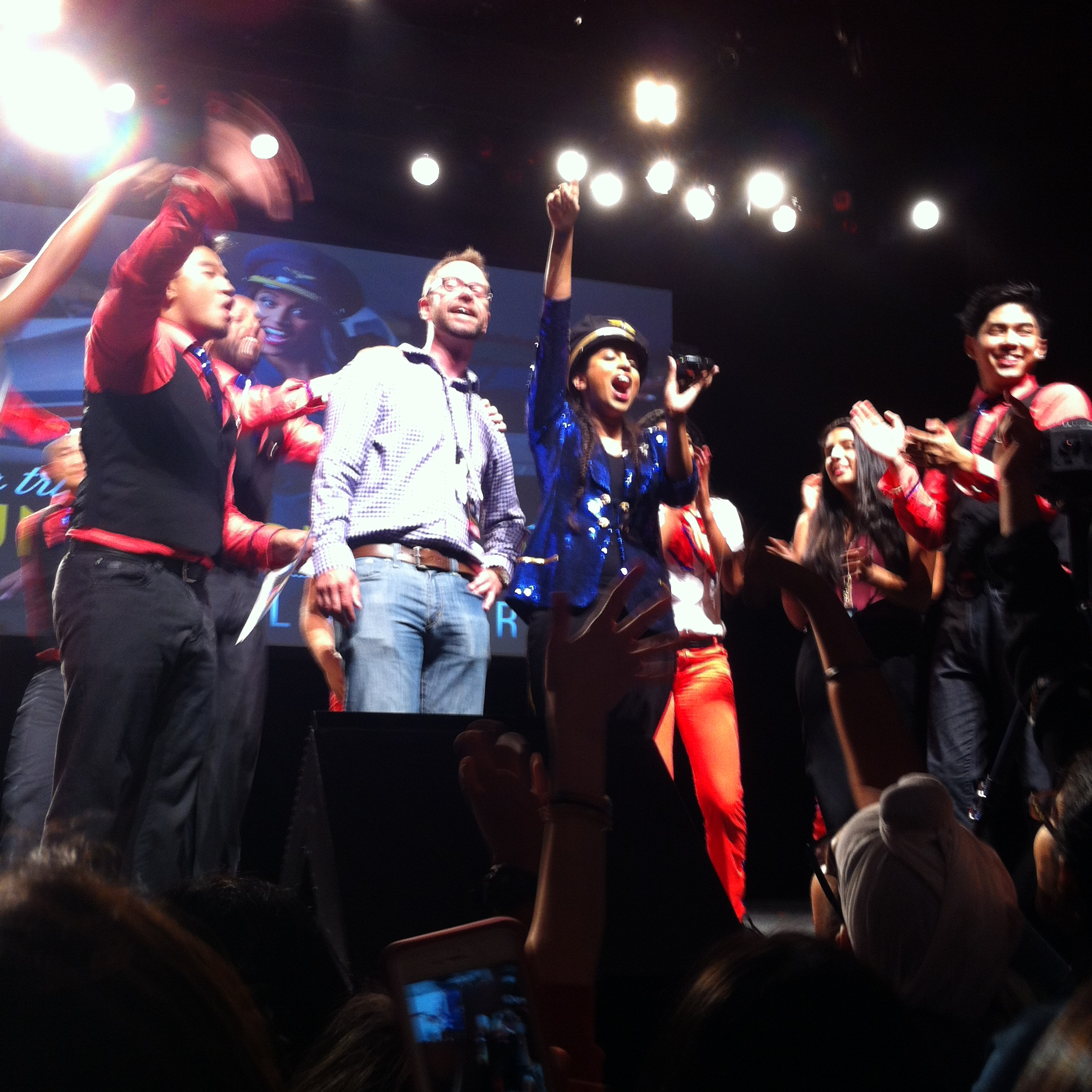
Singh performs at the Warfield in San Francisco during her world tour "A Trip to Unicorn Island"

Singh recorded and released another music video in February 2015 titled The Clean Up Anthem in collaboration with Canadian artist Sickick. In March 2015, Singh began a world tour called "A Trip to Unicorn Island", adapting her YouTube content and including singing, dancing, music performances, comedy, and her parent characters. Her tour covered India, Australia, Hong Kong, Singapore, Dubai, Canada, Trinidad and Tobago, the United Kingdom, and the United States. She documented the tour in her first feature movie, A Trip to Unicorn Island, which also describes how YouTube fame is affecting her life. The movie was released on February 10, 2016, on YouTube Red (now called YouTube Premium). Singh describes the film as being very "raw and genuine".

In April 2015, Singh released a song about her hometown Toronto in collaboration with Humble the Poet titled #IVIVI (roman numerals for 416, Toronto's area code). Singh received her first MTV Fandom Award, was nominated for two Teen Choice Awards, and won her first Streamy Award later that year. In December 2015, she moved to Los Angeles to further her career. In July 2016, she won two Teen Choice Awards from her three nominations.

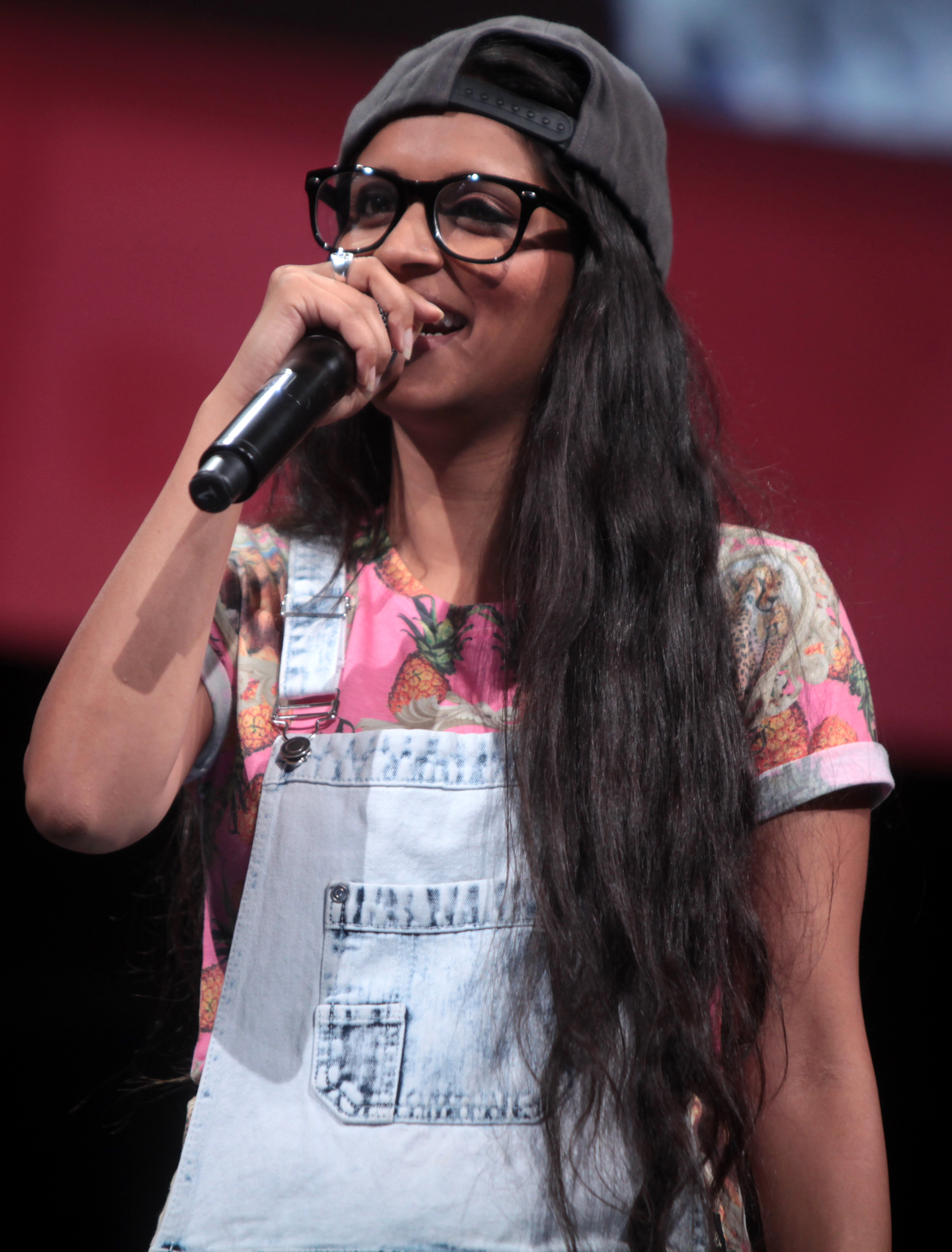
Singh speaking at VidCon

In 2016, Singh voiced miniature unicorns named Bubbles and Misty in the animated film Ice Age: Collision Course and played a cameo role in the film Bad Moms. In January 2017, she won a People's Choice Award for "Favorite YouTube Star". In September 2017, Singh won her fourth Streamy Award. Her first book, How to Be a Bawse: A Guide to Conquering Life, was released on March 28, 2017. The book reached No. 1 on the New York Times bestseller list. Singh won the award for Best Non-Fiction at the 2017 Goodreads Choice Awards. Her 2017 world tour was centered around the book release and key concepts she discussed. A successor book, titled Be a Triangle, was released on April 5, 2022. Singh was cast in HBO's film adaptation of Fahrenheit 451 after recording an audition outside an Internet café in Melbourne, Australia. She was in the region to promote her book and rushed the audition at her agent's urging around 2 a.m. in May 2017. She plays the character of Raven, "a tabloid blogger who works with the fire department to spread the ministry's propaganda by broadcasting their book-burning raids to fans".

In October 2017, Singh hosted SlutWalk, an initiative started by Amber Rose. In November 2017, she was also chosen as an ambassador for Pantene shampoo and partnered with Calvin Klein. In 2018, Singh appeared in the music video for Maroon 5's "Girls Like You" featuring Cardi B.

In 2018, Singh was to star in NBC pilot Bright Futures. The show was later cancelled by NBC and the pilot episode was left unaired. On April 13, 2018, Singh announced that she had launched her own production company Unicorn Island Productions. The company is based in Los Angeles, California.

=== A Little Late and other ventures (2019–present) ===
In March 2019, NBC announced that Singh would host a new late night talk show, A Little Late with Lilly Singh, which succeeded Last Call with Carson Daly following its series finale later in the year. She promoted the show during the season finale of America's Got Talent. The show premiered on September 16, 2019, to positive reviews by critics. On May 13, 2020, NBC renewed A Little Late with Lilly Singh for a second season. It premiered on January 11, 2021. On May 6, 2021, A Little Late with Lilly Singh ended after 2 seasons.

In August 2019, Singh dropped the name "Superwoman" in an Instagram post. Singh was also nominated for "Audience Choice Creator of the Year" at the 9th Streamy Awards.

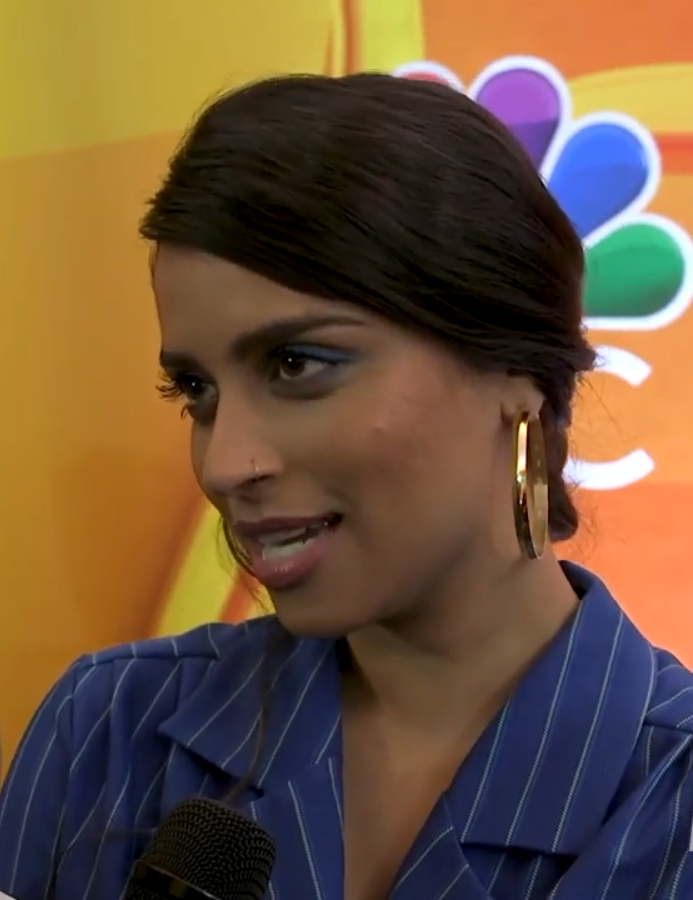
Singh at NBC 2019

In 2020, Singh partnered with the video-sharing app TikTok to start creating videos on the app. As of July 2023, she has over 1.5 million followers and over 30 million total likes on the app. She was scheduled to host the 31st GLAAD Media Awards in March 2020 before it was cancelled due to the COVID-19 pandemic. On August 18, 2020, Singh announced on the Today Show that she would star, write, and produce, a sketch comedy show titled Sketchy Times with Lilly Singh. NBC ordered 2 episodes of the show and was shot and filmed in Singh's home. The show was released on October 29, on Peacock. On September 1, 2020, Singh and other celebrities partnered with the Los Angeles 2028 Olympics organizing committee to create one of many emblems for the 2028 Summer Olympics. Singh's "A" represents gay pride. On September 11, it was announced that Singh will voice Penny in Riverdance: The Animated Adventure, released in 2021. It was also announced in October that Singh would be voicing a Pickles in another film, titled Hitpig!, released in 2024. In 2021, Singh signed onto a comedy project (produced by Kenya Barris) on Netflix. She and her Unicorn Island Productions banner struck a deal with Universal Television Alternative Studio.

Singh appeared as Liv in the second season of the Hulu series Dollface, which premiered on February 11, 2022. In October 2021, it was announced that Singh would be a judge on the second season of Canada's Got Talent, which premiered in March 2022. She also starred in The Muppets Mayhem for Disney+, which was announced on March 7, 2022. The show received mostly positive reviews. On April 6, 2022, Singh released her new book, Be a Triangle. Following the signing of a first-look deal with Bell Media, it was announced that Singh would host CTV's new primetime quiz show titled Battle of the Generations, which premiered on June 19, 2023. In March 2023, Singh co-hosted the 95th Academy Awards pre-show.

In 2024, Singh produced, wrote, and starred in the film Doin' It, directed by Sara Zandieh and premiering at South by Southwest, receiving mixed reviews from critics. The film was released in theatres on September 19, 2025. She is set to produce an adaption of the novel Arzu under her Unicorn Island Productions banner. In 2025, she launched a media network for social media content creators with South Asian descent, named Hyphen8. She also signed with United Talent Agency for representation.

== Public image ==
Punjabi culture is frequently portrayed in Singh's videos, which contain satires on people's complaints and prominent issues. Her most popular video is Three Girls, One Elevator (ft. Zendaya & Winnie Harlow) which also promotes her women's empowerment campaign GirlLove, and her most popular series features her fictional parents, Paramjeet and Manjeet, both played by Singh herself, reacting to trending and controversial videos. She also frequently collaborates with celebrities on her videos.

Singh has been accused of cultural appropriation of African-American culture by publications such as The Huffington Post, Bitch, ColorLines, and Vice. Anna Silman of The Cut accused Singh of appropriating both Black and Indo-Caribbean culture on her channel because of her tendency to don a "blaccent", whilst making rap videos sporting chains and cornrows. Tayo Bero of Teen Vogue wrote that "[Singh] falls into a category of non-black people of color in entertainment who have built massive followings often by mimicking black culture and leaning heavily into Black stereotypes." Rachna Raj Kaur and Radheyan Simonpillai of Now similarly criticized Singh's appropriation of black culture due to her use of braids, hip-hop slang and Caribbean accents. Singh has responded to the criticism by stating her mannerisms are due to her upbringing, adding "all my friends from Scarborough [Toronto] act exactly like me."

Born to Sikh parents and raised Sikh herself, Singh nevertheless garnered controversy for her remarks on turbans. During a visit to Jessica Alba's home, Singh met Alba's two young daughters who were both wearing twisted towels on their heads, to which she responded "They look like my Punjabi friends [...]" On September 27, 2019, BBC reported that Singh had apologized for an on-air joke that compared turbans to bath towels, in which members of the Sikh religion, who wear turbans for spiritual reasons, were angered by her remarks on NBC, with the BBC remarking that "[Singh] has used her platform to often call out public figures who she says deserve to be 'cancelled' for their offences."

Singh expressed her support for the George Floyd protests and attended one protest herself in Los Angeles. She was featured in a campaign fundraiser for the Joe Biden 2020 presidential campaign. Singh also expressed her support for the 2020–2021 Indian farmers' protest, in various social media posts. In 2023, she expressed her outrage over the killing of Jaahnavi Kandula in Seattle, Washington, on social media.

In 2017, Singh was announced as a UNICEF Goodwill Ambassador, to advocate for children's rights. She has led a campaign called "GirlLove", promoting girls to end girl-on-girl bullying. In July 2018, Singh travelled to South Africa to meet the students of elementary schools who spoke against bullying and classroom violence. Since 2022, Singh created the "Unicorn Island Fund", a non-profit charity that continues the work of "GirlLove". In 2024, she was appointed as a United Nations Sustainable Development Goals advocate by Secretary-General António Guterres. Singh explained her main focus on gender equality stating that "Gender equality underpins the success of all the SDGs...It is hard to overstate its importance. Girls and women are half of the world’s population and hold half of the world’s human potential. When we invest in girls and women, the whole world benefits."

== Personal life ==
Singh is an Indo-Canadian who developed a strong connection with her Punjabi heritage during visits to India. Although raised as a Sikh, she stated in an Instagram post that she does not follow any religion, but she strongly believes in God. She struggled with depression and began making YouTube videos as a way of dealing with her feelings. As a young adult, Singh lived with her parents in Markham, Ontario. In February 2019, Singh came out as bisexual via social media. In 2022, she was diagnosed with ovarian cysts.

In July 2020, Singh announced that she and other celebrities were bringing a National Women's Soccer League team to Los Angeles, called Angel City FC, which began playing in 2022. In May 2025, Singh joined the ownership group for the Toronto Tempo.

== Filmography ==
=== Film ===
Year	Title	Role	Notes
2011	Thank You	Bhangra dancer	Uncredited cameo in climax scene
2011	Speedy Singhs	Bhangra dancer	Guest appearance
2014	Gulaab Gang	Herself	Playback singer and in song "Mauj Ki Malharein"
2014	Dr. Cabbie	Lilly	Guest appearance
2016	A Trip to Unicorn Island	Herself	Documentary; also executive producer
2016	Ice Age: Collision Course	Misty / Bubbles (voice)	First voice role
2016	Bad Moms	Cathy	
2017	F the Prom	Miss Fallsburg	Cameo
2021	Riverdance: The Animated Adventure	Penny (voice)	
2022	The Bad Guys	Tiffany Fluffit (voice)	
2024	Doin' It (Note: Theatrically released in 2025.)	Maya	Also executive producer
2024	Hitpig!	Pickles (voice)	
2025	The Bad Guys 2	Tiffany Fluffit (voice)	
2026	Best of the Best	Sunny Singh	
2026	Let's Have Kids!	Madison	

=== Television ===
Year	Title	Role	Notes
2016	Life in Pieces	Amanda	Episode: "Window Vanity Dress Grace"
2016	The Chica Show	Herself	
2017	Bizaardvark	Herself	Episode: "Paige's Birthday Is Gonna Be Great"
2017	Canada: The Story of Us	Herself	Episode: "Connected (1824–1890)"
2018	Fahrenheit 451	Raven	Television film
2019	The Substitute	Herself	Episode: "Lilly Singh"
2019–2021	A Little Late with Lilly Singh	Herself	Talk show
2020	Medical Police	Baroness Von Eaglesburg	Episode: "Real Heavy Hitter"
2020	One World: Together at Home	Herself	Television special
2020	Together in Pride: You Are Not Alone	Herself	Television special
2020	The Simpsons	Kensey (voice)	Episode: "The Hateful Eight-Year-Olds"
2020	The Red Nose Day Special	Herself	Television special
2020	WE Celebrate: Class of 2020	Herself/host	Television special
2020	Sketchy Times with Lilly Singh	Herself/Various characters	Sketch comedy show
2021–2022	Mira, Royal Detective	Cameo	
2022–2024	Canada's Got Talent	Herself/judge	Seasons 2–4
2022	Dollface	Liv	Recurring role
2022	Cardi Tries	Herself	Episode: "Cardi Tries Firefighting"
2023	The Muppets Mayhem	Nora	Lead role
2023	Battle of the Generations	Herself	Host
2023	95th Academy Awards pre-show	Herself	Co-host
2024	Billboard Women in Music red carpet	Herself	Host
2025	Shifting Gears	Jen	Episode: "Date"
2026	Deli Boys	Aisha	Season 2 Episode 4

=== Web ===
Year	Title	Role	Notes
2014	Giving Back Glam	Herself/host	
2014	YouTube Rewind 2014: Turn Down for 2014	Herself	
2014–2015	The Tube's Hautest	Herself/ Various Characters	
2015	Lana Steele: Makeup Spy	Lana Steele	
2015	Terminator Genisys: The YouTube Chronicles	Lilly	Episode: "Part Three"
2015	YouTube Rewind 2015: Now Watch Me 2015	Herself	
2016	Epic Rap Battles of History	Wonder Woman	Episode: "Wonder Woman vs Stevie Wonder"
2016	YouTube Rewind 2016: The Ultimate 2016 Challenge	Herself	
2017	YouTube Rewind 2017: The Shape of 2017	Herself	
2018	YouTube Rewind 2018: Everyone Controls Rewind	Herself	
2020	Barkitecture	Herself	1 episode
2020	One Nation At Home	Herself	Virtual COVID-19 pandemic Relief Concert
2020	I For India	Herself	Virtual COVID-19 pandemic Relief Concert
2021	Girl Talk	Herself	
2023	Mindful Adventures of Unicorn Island	Lilly	
2025	Shame Less with Lilly Singh	Herself/host	
TBA	Lilly Singh's Proud Princess	Herself	

=== Music videos ===
Year	Title	Artist(s)	Role	Ref.
2017	"Hold My Heart"	Lindsey Stirling featuring Phelba	Herself (cameo)	
2017	"H.A.I.R."	Humble the Poet	Herself (cameo)	
2018	"Girls Like You" (Original, Volume 2 and Vertical Video versions)	Maroon 5 featuring Cardi B	Herself (cameo)	

== Discography ==
=== Singles ===
List of singles
Year	Title
2013	"Hipshaker" (featured by Jassi Sidhu)
2014	"#Leh" (with Humble the Poet)
2014	"Mauj Ki Malharein"
2015	"Clean Up Anthem" (featuring Sickick)
2015	"#IVIVI" (with Humble the Poet)
2019	"Drop Splash Banana"

== Bibliography ==
- How to be a Bawse: A Guide to Conquering Life (2017)
- Be A Triangle: How I Went From Being Lost Into Getting My Life Into Shape (2022)

== Accolades ==
In 2014, Singh's channel ranked at #39 on New Media Rockstars Top 100 Channels. In September 2015, People magazine included Singh on their annual "Ones to Watch" list. She was also featured in Fast Company Magazine as the 100 Most Creative People in Business. Variety magazine recognized her as one of their 10 Comics to Watch for 2016, and she was honored at the Just For Laughs Film Festival in Montreal. Forbes named her one of the 40 most powerful people in comedy in 2019. On October 19, 2019, Singh was named one of Vogue India's Women of the Year. She also was placed on the Time 100 Next list. She has received an MTV Fandom Award, four Streamy Awards, two Teen Choice Awards and a People's Choice Award. In addition, Singh has received nominations for a Daytime Emmy Award and two Canadian Screen Awards. She received an honorary Doctor of Laws degree from York University and served as its commencement speaker on October 15, 2025.

=== Awards and nominations ===
Year	Award	Category	Nominee	Result	Ref.
2014	Shorty Awards	YouTube Comedian	Herself	Nominated	
2014	Streamy Awards	Best Original Song	"#Leh" (with Humble the Poet)	Nominated	
2015	MTV Fandom Awards	Social Superstar of the Year	Herself	Won	
2015	Teen Choice Awards	Choice Web Star: Comedy	Herself	Nominated	
2015	Teen Choice Awards	Choice YouTuber	Herself	Nominated	
2015	Shorty Awards	YouTube Comedian	Herself	Nominated	
2015	Streamy Awards	First Person	Herself	Won	
2016	Teen Choice Awards	Choice Web Star: Comedy	Herself	Won	
2016	Teen Choice Awards	Choice Web Star: Female	Herself	Won	
2016	Teen Choice Awards	Choice YouTuber	Herself	Nominated	
2016	Shorty Awards	YouTuber of the Year	Herself	Nominated	
2016	Streamy Awards	Feature	A Trip to Unicorn Island	Won	
2016	Streamy Awards	Audience Choice Entertainer of the Year	Herself	Nominated	
2016	Streamy Awards	Social Good Campaign	Girl Love Challenge	Won	
2017	People's Choice Awards	Favorite YouTube Star	Herself	Won	
2017	Teen Choice Awards	Choice Web Star: Comedy	Herself	Nominated	
2017	Teen Choice Awards	Choice Comedian	Herself	Nominated	
2017	Teen Choice Awards	Choice Web Star: Female	Herself	Nominated	
2017	Teen Choice Awards	Choice YouTuber	Herself	Nominated	
2017	Streamy Awards	Entertainer of the Year	Herself	Nominated	
2017	Streamy Awards	First Person	Herself	Won	
2017	Streamy Awards	Collaboration	The YouTube Factory (Dwayne Johnson ft. Lilly Singh, Markiplier, Grace Helbig, Roman Atwood, Gigi Gorgeous, Alex Wassabi, LaurDIY, King Bach, Flula Borg and Brittney Smith)	Nominated	
2017	Streamy Awards	Influencer Campaign	Power Rangers (with Dude Perfect)	Nominated	
2017	Streamy Awards	Purpose Awards Honoree, Creator	Herself	Won	
2017	Shorty Awards	YouTuber of the Year	Herself	Nominated	
2017	Goodreads Choice Awards	Best Non-Fiction	How to Be a Bawse: A Guide to Conquering Life	Won	
2018	Shorty Awards	Creator of the Decade	Herself	Nominated	
2019	Streamy Awards	Audience Choice Creator of the Year	Herself	Nominated	
2019	Kids' Choice Awards	Favorite Social Star	Herself	Nominated	
2019	Teen Choice Awards	Choice Female Web Star	Herself	Nominated	
2019	Teen Choice Awards	Choice Comedian	Herself	Nominated	
2020	Kids' Choice Awards	Favorite Female Social Star	Herself	Nominated	
2020	Canadian Screen Awards	Cogeco Fund Audience Choice Award	A Little Late with Lilly Singh (as host)	Nominated	
2020	GLAAD Media Awards	Outstanding Variety or Talk Show Episode	Lilly is Struggling to Date Women (as host)	Nominated	
2020	The Queerties	Closet Door Bustdown	Herself	Nominated	
2020	Daytime Emmy Awards	Outstanding Interactive Media for a Daytime Program	Macy's Thanksgiving Day Parade 360 Live (as producer)	Nominated	
2021	GLAAD Media Awards	Outstanding Variety or Talk Show Episode	Lilly Responds to Comments About Her Sexuality (as host)	Won	
2021	MTV Movie & TV Awards	Best Talk/Topical Show	A Little Late with Lilly Singh (as host)	Nominated	
2023	Canadian Screen Awards	Host or presenter, factual or reality/competition	Howie Mandel, Lilly Singh, Kardinal Offishall, Trish Stratus and Lindsay Ell, Canada's Got Talent (as judge)	Nominated	
2023	Webby Awards	Corporate Social Responsibility	Johnnie Walker and Lilly Singh Join Forces for Gender Parity in Leadership	Nominated	
2024	Kids' Choice Awards	Favorite Female TV Star – Kids Show	The Muppets Mayhem (as Nora Singh)	Nominated	
2024	Canadian Screen Awards	Host or presenter, factual or reality/competition	Howie Mandel, Lilly Singh, Kardinal Offishall, Trish Stratus and Lindsay Ell, Canada's Got Talent (as judge)	Nominated	

=== Honorary degree ===
Name of school, year given, and name of degree
School	Year	Degree	Ref.
York University	2025	Doctor of Laws (LL.D.)	

== See also ==
- South Asian Canadians in the Greater Toronto Area
