= Humble the Poet =

Spoken word artist, writer, creative rapper and author

- Born: Kanwer Singh; 12 July 1981 (age 45); Toronto, Ontario, Canada
- Occupations: spoken-word artist; rapper/singer; writer

YouTube information
- Channel: Humble The Poet
- Subscribers: 174 thousand
- Views: 11.3 million
- Last updated: 15 Apr 2026
- Website: www.humblethepoet.com

Kanwer Singh (born 12 July 1981), known professionally as Humble the Poet, is a Canadian author, spoken-word artist, and media personality. He is the author of the self-development books Unlearn: 101 Simple Truths for a Better Life, Things No One Else Can Teach Us, How to Be Love(d), and UnAnxious. Singh began his career as a Toronto school teacher before leaving the profession to pursue spoken word and digital media full-time. He has toured internationally as a speaker and performer and has appeared on podcasts, television programs, and live speaking events.

== Early life ==
Kanwer Singh was born and raised in Toronto, Ontario, Canada, to Punjabi Sikh immigrant parents. Before pursuing creative work full-time, he worked as an elementary school teacher. In 2010, he left teaching to focus on spoken word, music, and writing.

== Career ==
Singh began releasing spoken-word and music content on YouTube in the late 2000s and toured internationally as a performer and speaker. He collaborated with YouTuber Lilly Singh on music videos including “#LEH” and “#IVIVI.” He later transitioned into writing and publishing books focused on personal development, relationships, and mental health. Singh appeared on A Little Late with Lilly Singh in 2020 and 2021. In 2025, he released UnAnxious, addressing anxiety and overthinking. He also participated in live podcast events connected to Jay Shetty’s On Purpose tour.

== Bibliography ==
- Unlearn: 101 Simple Truths Without the Bullshit (2018)
- Unlearn: 101 Simple Truths for a Better Life (2019)
- Things No One Else Can Teach Us (2019)
- How to Be Love(d): Simple Truths for Going Easier on Yourself, Embracing Imperfection & Loving Your Way to a Better Life (2023)
- UnAnxious: 50 Simple Truths to Help Overthinkers Feel Less Stress and More Calm (2025)

== Awards and nominations ==
Year	Award Show	Category	Result
2014	Streamy Awards	Best Original Song (#Leh With Lilly Singh)	Nominated
2017	Canada Reads	Championing Fifteen Dogs by André Alexis	Won

== Media appearances ==
Singh has appeared in podcast interviews and live events discussing personal growth and creativity. He has been featured on:

- The Breakfast Club
- On Purpose with Jay Shetty
- The School of Greatness with Lewis Howes

== Speaking and public engagement ==
Singh has toured internationally as a speaker and performer, presenting talks on creativity, personal growth, and relationships. He has appeared at conferences, universities, and corporate events.

== See also ==
- South Asian Canadians in the Greater Toronto Area
