= Kirk DeMicco =

American writer and director

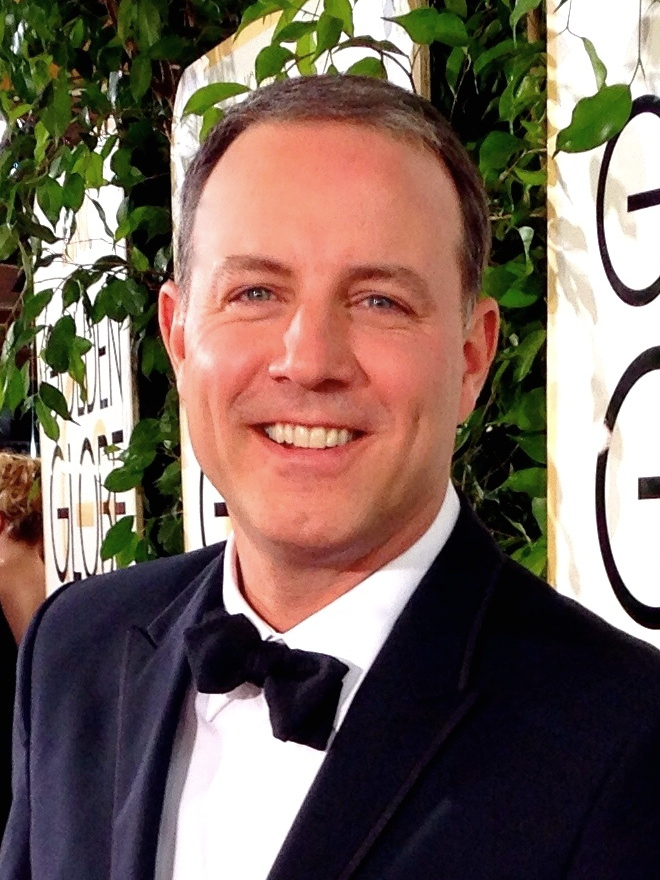
- Kirk DeMicco at the 2014 Golden Globe Awards
- Born: May 15, 1969 (age 57); Wyckoff, New Jersey, U.S.
- Education: University of Southern California
- Occupations: Screenwriter; film director; producer
- Years active: 1998–present
- Notable work: Space Chimps; The Croods; Vivo; Ruby Gillman, Teenage Kraken

Kirk DeMicco (born May 15, 1969) is an American filmmaker. He is best known for his work on animated films, such as writing and directing Space Chimps (2008), The Croods (2013), Vivo (2021), and Ruby Gillman, Teenage Kraken (2023). Raised in Wyckoff, New Jersey and a former resident of Franklin Lakes, DeMicco attended Ramapo High School.

== Journalism ==
After graduation in 1991 from the University of Southern California, where he double majored in economics and political science, he spent three years in Italy, where he worked as a journalist, interviewing individuals involved in the Italian movie industry for an Italian film-business magazine. After returning to the United States, he worked for the William Morris Agency in New York City, before relocating to the firm's office in Los Angeles in a transfer arranged by talent agent Lee Stollman.

== Career ==
DeMicco's first script sale was called A Day in November which he sold to Warner Bros. and producer Arnold Kopelson for $1 million before signing to write Quest for Camelot. Later he wrote and co-produced Racing Stripes for director Frederik Du Chau. John Cleese and DeMicco co-wrote the film adaptation of the Roald Dahl's children classic The Twits. He also wrote Splitting Adam, a movie that was set up at United Artists. He then worked as a writer on Here Comes Peter Cottontail: The Movie and later worked on Casper's Scare School. While working at Warner Bros., he and Du Chau also wrote a script for a live-action–animated film based on the Hanna-Barbera character, Hong Kong Phooey, which they sold to Alcon Entertainment. He adapted the Jack Kirby comic New Gods, and collaborated with filmmaker Barry Sonnenfeld on an adaptation of an Elmore Leonard novel. He has also done many production rewrites for Disney, Warner Bros., DreamWorks and Spyglass. In television, he is the creator and executive producer of the Discovery Channel documentary Halo: Freefall Warriors.

=== Space Chimps ===
In 2008, he wrote and directed the movie Space Chimps for John H. Williams and his company Vanguard Animation; the film is inspired by the first chimpanzee to go to space, Ham.

=== The Croods ===
In 2013, DeMicco co-wrote and co-directed DreamWorks Animation's The Croods with Chris Sanders, which they also both co-wrote the film's theme song Shine Your Way. DeMicco began writing the film with John Cleese in 2005. The Croods grossed over $582 million worldwide at the box office, and was nominated for the Academy Award for Best Animated Feature. It was also nominated for a Golden Globe. DeMicco and Sanders then worked on The Croods sequel for three and a half years, before its cancellation in late 2016, until it was revived a year later, where they were replaced by Joel Crawford.

=== Vivo ===
In December 2016, it was reported that DeMicco was directing Vivo for Sony Pictures Animation released on August 6, 2021. Lin-Manuel Miranda wrote new songs for the musical animated feature. Lin-Manuel Miranda reported that Vivo has been 10 years in the making and that it's in amazing shape. And that and Quiara [Alegría Hudes], my cowriter on [In the] Heights, is working on the screenplay with Kirk [De Micco], our director." In May of 2021, it was reported that Netflix has licensed all of the film's global rights, sans China. The movie was written by DeMicco and Pulitzer Prize winner Quiara Alegría Hudes, who wrote the book for Miranda's Tony-winning Broadway musical In the Heights. Said Miranda, “Bringing Vivo to life has been an incredible artistic journey. I couldn’t ask for better creative partners than Kirk, Quiara, Alex and the entire team at Sony Animation. I’m so excited Vivo will have a home at Netflix, where kids of all ages will be able to enjoy the film’s songs and adventures again and again.”

=== Ruby Gillman, Teenage Kraken ===
In March 2023, DeMicco was announced as the director for the animated teen comedy film Ruby Gillman, Teenage Kraken (replacing the film's original director Paul Tibbitt), which was released on June 30, 2023.

=== Margie Claus ===
In July 2025, DeMicco was announced as the director of Warner Bros. Pictures Animation's Margie Claus, scheduled to be released on November 12, 2027.

== Filmography ==
- Quest for Camelot (1998) (screenwriter)
- Racing Stripes (2005) (story writer, co-producer)
- Here Comes Peter Cottontail: The Movie (2005) (writer)
- Casper's Scare School (2006) (writer)
- Space Chimps (2008) (director, writer)
- The Croods (2013) (director, writer)
- The Star (2017) (Creative consultant)
- The Croods: A New Age (2020) (story writer)
- Vivo (2021) (director, screenwriter)
- Ruby Gillman, Teenage Kraken (2023) (director, additional screenplay material)
- Margie Claus (2027) (director)

== Selected awards and nominations ==
Ceremony	Year	Category	Nominated work	Result	Ref.
Academy Awards	2014	Best Animated Feature	The Croods	Nominated	
Annie Awards	2014	Outstanding Directing in a Feature Production	The Croods	Nominated	
Critics' Choice Movie Awards	2014	Best Animated Feature	The Croods	Nominated	
Golden Globe Awards	2014	Best Animated Feature Film	The Croods	Nominated	
People's Choice Awards	2021	Favorite Family Movie	Vivo	Nominated	
Satellite Awards	2022	Best Animated or Mixed Media Feature	Vivo	Nominated	
St. Louis Gateway Film Critics Association Awards	2021	Best Animated Film	Vivo	Nominated	
