= Get Squirrely =

2015 film by Ross Venokur

Get Squirrely!
- Theatrical Release poster
- Directed by: Ross Venokur
- Written by: Lenore Venokur
- Produced by: Dan Krech
- Starring: Jason Jones; Will Forte; John Leguizamo; Samantha Bee; Victoria Justice; John Cleese; Jim Cummings
- Cinematography: Kyran Kelly
- Music by: Marcelo Quinonez
- Production company: Vanguard Animation
- Distributed by: Viva Pictures (under Viva Kids)
- Release date: November 4, 2016
- Running time: 82 minutes
- Country: United States
- Language: English
- Box office: $1.2 million

Get Squirrely (also distributed as A.C.O.R.N.S.: Operation Crack Down) is a 2016 American animated heist comedy film produced by John H. Williams (through Vanguard Animation) and Dan Krech and directed by Ross Venokur. Released on November 4, 2016, the film was Vanguard Animation's first theatrically released feature film since 2010's Space Chimps 2: Zartog Strikes Back to avoid competition with 2014's The Nut Job. However, the film received mixed reviews.

== Plot ==
Frankie (Jason Jones), a smooth-talking squirrel, finds out that acorns are being stolen by the evil A.C.O.R.N.S. Corporation. Now he must assemble a rag-tag team of forest animals with only three days to pull off their biggest heist yet.

== Voice cast ==
- Jason Jones as Frankie
- Will Forte as Cody
- John Leguizamo as Fly Boy/Liam
- Samantha Bee as Raitch
- Victoria Justice as Lola
- John Cleese as Mr. Bellwood
- Jim Cummings as Bear/Edsy
- Denise Oliver as Floor Guard

== Development ==
The film was first announced in 2011 under the original title The Nut House.
