= Rally Road Racers =

2023 animated film directed by Ross Venokur

- Theatrical release poster
- Directed by: Ross Venokur
- Written by: Ross Venokur
- Produced by: Deepak Nayar; Nik Bower; John H. Williams
- Starring: Jimmy O. Yang; J. K. Simmons; Chloe Bennet; Lisa Lu; Sharon Horgan; Catherine Tate; John Cleese
- Cinematography: Alexei Nechytaylo
- Edited by: Adam Garner
- Music by: Tom Howe
- Production companies: Virtuso Productions; Riverstone Pictures; LipSync; Vanguard Animation; Kintop Pictures; REP Productions 6 Ltd.
- Distributed by: Viva Kids (United States); Vertigo Releasing (United Kingdom)
- Release dates: May 12, 2023 (United States); September 15, 2023 (United Kingdom)
- Running time: 92 minutes
- Countries: United Arab Emirates; United Kingdom; United States
- Language: English
- Box office: $3.2 million

Rally Road Racers, formerly known as Silk Road Rally, is a 2023 animated sports comedy film written and directed by Ross Venokur. The film stars an ensemble cast including Jimmy O. Yang, J.K. Simmons, Chloe Bennet, Lisa Lu, Sharon Horgan, Catherine Tate and John Cleese. It follows novice racer Zhi as he tries to save his rural village from villainous racer and real-estate developer Archie Vainglorious.

The film is an international co-production between the United Arab Emirates, the United Kingdom and the United States, and is produced by Virtuso Productions, Riverstone Pictures, Kintop Pictures and Vanguard Animation in association with LipSync and REP Productions 6 Ltd. The film was theatrically released in the United States by Viva Kids on 12 May 2023 and in the United Kingdom by Vertigo Releasing on 15 September. Despite having a limited release in theaters, the film received favorable reviews from critics.

== Plot ==
In a world of anthropomorphic animals, a slow loris named Zhi (voiced by Jimmy O. Yang) lives with his grandmother in a rural Chinese village. As a child, his idol is a villainous cane toad racer named Archie Vainglorious (voiced by John Cleese), but as a young adult he discovers Vainglorious Industries' plans to demolish his village and put in cane toad housing. Initially hopeful that he can reach an understanding with Vainglorious, Zhi instead finds him boastful and dismissive. Vainglorious does, however, agree to challenge Zhi in an upcoming rally race for the fate of the village.

Gnash (voiced by J. K. Simmons), a retired goat racer-turned-mechanic, reluctantly agrees to help Zhi train, out of a sense of duty to Zhi's deceased mother. Gnash also provides Zhi with a sports car and rides with him in it. The race has no rules, and Zhi discovers the deep-pocketed Vainglorious is willing to cheat and play dirty at every opportunity. Zhi also struggles with performance anxiety when he's in the lead, something Gnash struggles to talk him out of.

During downtime between the stages of the race, Zhi meets and falls in love with Shelby (voiced by Chloe Bennet), a fellow slow loris. Unknown to him, she's working for Vainglorious and feeding the latter the information Zhi tells her. Discovering that she shares Zhi's romantic feelings, Shelby feels increasingly torn over her duplicity, and finally breaks with Vainglorious.

With help from the other racers, who are sympathetic to him, Zhi is able to defeat Vainglorious and save his village. Vainglorious throws a fit and then has to face the wrath of his family, who had a financial stake in him winning the race.

== Voice cast ==
- Jimmy O. Yang as Zhi, a 19-year-old Chinese slow loris who aspires to be a racer: he is the main protagonist in the film
- J. K. Simmons as Gnash, a Russian goat and retired racer who is Zhi's mentor
- Chloe Bennet as Shelby, a slow loris who is Zhi's love interest
- Lisa Lu as Granny Bai, an elderly slow loris who is Zhi's grandmother
- Sharon Horgan as Abby Jacks, an Australian-accented red kangaroo who narrates the Silk Road Rally
- Catherine Tate as Juni Håkansdotter, a Swedish reindeer and Abby Jacks’ sister-in-law, who (at the repeated request of Jacks’ husband) co-narrates the Silk Road Rally alongside her
- John Cleese as Archie Vainglorious, the main antagonist, a cane toad who has plans to take down the Slow Loris village
- Naomi McDonald as Adelina, a female seahorse and Beppe's wife, who befriends Zhi during the race.
- Kerry Shale as Beppe, a pregnant male seahorse and Adelina's husband, who befriends Zhi during the race.

Nick Heath voices a Bonzer Rally announcer and a dirt track announcer. Raza Jaffrey voices Team Tandem. Rebecca Yeo voices Bling Squared. Alexander Rodriguez voices Team Chaos. Naomi McDonald also voices an Old Female Loris. Kerry Shale also voices a Cheetah Racer, Draymond Cheeta, an Old Male Loris, the Echoes, the British Invasion, Neil, The Hillbilly Heat, the Tiger Henchmen, a Loris with a cell phone, Daddy Vainglorious and a Gnash super fan.

== Production ==
During the production of Charming, Venokur came up with the film's idea and planned to make a koala as the main character. He changed the lead character into a slow loris in order to focus the idea of a "slow-moving animal who wants to be a race car driver".

The film took over three years to be made. Animation was handled by ReDefine with a team of over 200 artists. Pre-production, storyboard and compositing were done at Montreal facilities, animation and lighting were done in Mumbai, and post-production in London. The film was animated using Maya and rendered on Clarisse. Visual effects supervisor Alexei Nechytaylo cited films like Rush and Senna as influences for the racing scenes, and well spent several days in Shanghai to study settings and Chinese culture.

== Reception ==
=== Box office ===
Rally Road Racers was released in the United States on 12 May 2023, and placed 17th its opening weekend. It made $419,717 in its opening weekend and finished its domestic run with $744,169. Combined with an international gross of $2,413,765, it has made $3,157,934 as of July 2024. In Russia June 22, 2023 weekend is $810 075.

=== Critical response ===
The film received favorable reviews from critics and it is the highest reviewed Vanguard Animation film released by the studio on Rotten Tomatoes. On the review aggregator website Rotten Tomatoes, 73% of 22 critics' reviews are positive, with an average rating of 6.1/10.
