= Galaxy High School =

1986 American-Japanese animated television series

- Genre: Animation; Science fiction Comedy
- Created by: Chris Columbus
- Developed by: Larry DiTillio
- Directed by: David Hilberman
- Voices of: Pat Carroll; Susan Blu; Nancy Cartwright; Guy Christopher; Gino Conforti; Jennifer Darling; Pat Fraley; Henry Gibson; David L. Lander; Danny Mann; Howard Morris; Hal Rayle; Neil Ross; John Stephenson
- Music by: Don Felder
- Countries of origin: United States; Japan
- Original languages: English; Japanese
- No. of episodes: 13

Production
- Executive producer: Yutaka Fujioka
- Producers: Gerard Baldwin; Barry Glasser
- Running time: 24 minutes
- Production company: TMS Entertainment, Inc.

Original release
- Network: CBS (United States)
- Release: September 13 – December 6, 1986

Galaxy High School (ギャラクシー・ハイスクール) is a science fiction animated series that premiered on September 13, 1986, on CBS and ran for 13 episodes until December 6, 1986. The series was created by Chris Columbus and featured music and a theme song composed by Don Felder.

== Synopsis ==
Two human teenagers from Earth are accepted into the intergalactic high school Galaxy High School on the fictional asteroid Flutor. The boy is Doyle Cleverlobe, a skilled athlete and popular. The girl, Aimee Brighttower, is shy and, as the theme song states, "the smartest girl in school, not very popular, not very cool."

However, at the new school, the humans' identities are somewhat reversed: the teenaged aliens seem to accept the not-so-popular Aimee, while Doyle is found to be irritating. Doyle becomes an outcast and has difficulties adjusting, but Aimee does not abandon him. She suggests he can make friends and bring glory to Galaxy High through his excellent athletic abilities. He wins a championship in "psych-hockey", which Galaxy High had always lost in the past. The show drops many hints of a budding romance between Doyle and Aimee, but it did not materialize; it was never given time to grow, as the show was not renewed for a second season.

Aliens at the school include Gilda Gossip, the girl with a big mouth (or rather mouths), Booey Bubblehead, an absentminded girl with a bubble for a head; Milo de Venus, the six-armed class president; Beef (a chicken-like alien) and the Bonk Bunch, the school bullies; and the Creep, a small alien resembling something between a fat cherub and a yellow marshmallow who has a huge crush on Aimee, which often revealed itself as he serenaded like a Las Vegas lounge singer. The teachers are even more unusual than the students: Ms. Biddy McBrain has a light bulb attached to her head, while Coach Frogface eats flies, and Professor Icenstein who must keep his classroom cold so he will not melt.

== Cast ==
Character	English	Japanese
Aimee Brightower	Susan Blu	Hiroko Emori
Doyle Cleverlobe	Hal Rayle	Masashi Hironaka
Professor Icenstein	Howard Morris	Ichiro Nagai
Ms. Biddy McBrain	Pat Carroll	Miyoko Aso
"Flat" Freddy Fender	Nancy Cartwright	Keiko Yamamoto
Gilda Gossip	Nancy Cartwright	Keiko Yamamoto
Earl Eccchhh	Guy Christopher	Kenichi Ogata
Booey Bubblehead	Jennifer Darling	Michie Tomizawa
Milo de Venus	David L. Lander	Toshiharu Sakurai
Creep	Danny Mann	Yuji Mitsuya
Rotten Roland	Neil Ross	Naoki Tatsuta
Beef Bonk	John Stephenson	Daisuke Gori

Additional English (Original) voices

- Gino Conforti (Ollie Oilslick, Reggie Unicycle)
- Jennifer Darling (Myrtle Blastermeier, Wendy Garbo)
- Pat Fraley (Coach Frogface, Sludge)
- Henry Gibson (Doyle's locker)
- Howard Morris (Luigi La Bounci, Others)
- John Stephenson (Harvey Blastermeier)

== Crew ==
- Howard Morris - Voice Director

== Episodes ==
No.	Title	Animation directed by	Written by	Original release date
1	"Welcome to Galaxy High"	Michiyo Sakurai	Chris Columbus	September 13, 1986
Earth teens Doyle and Aimee arrive at Galaxy High, where football star Doyle expects to enjoy even more popularity than he did on Earth. They are given a tour by the six-armed Milo de Venus. Much to the surprise of Doyle (who never studied), he now finds himself unpopular, while Aimee, the smartest (and unpopular) kid at their old school, quickly makes friends here (Wendy Garbo, Booey Bubblehead, and Gilda Gossip). Milo points out that the male population of Galaxy High vastly outnumbers the female students and that Doyle is nothing special compared to Aimee. Because of her good grades, she is given a scholarship and a space car, while Doyle is made to get a job at a pizza place (where Milo also works) to pay his tuition, only getting a scooter. He also quickly earns the enmity of a group of bullies called the Bonk Bunch, whose leader, Beef Bonk, hates Earth. However, when Beef challenges him to a game of Zuggleball, which is similar to hockey (but with a living puck), Doyle wins and gains a measure of popularity at his new school. Although Aimee says Doyle is once again a star, a more mature Doyle admits the popularity may be hard to maintain, and that he needs to start showing more respect for others.
2	"Pizza's Honor"	Kazuhide Tomonaga	Larry DiTillio	September 20, 1986
Luigi receives an order of 100 pizzas, to be delivered to the planet Tingler, which everyone is afraid of because it is supposed to be haunted. After Luigi has Milo make the pizzas, he tells Doyle to travel to Tingler to make the delivery. Doyle agrees to do his assigned job to maintain "pizza's honor," as Luigi has a reputation for delivering pizzas to anywhere in the galaxy. Doyle then gets a reputation for bravery, gaining the admiration of the girls, and the Galaxy High students laugh at Beef because an Earth boy is braver than him! This causes Beef, Roland, and Earl to follow Doyle and try scaring him, causing both their ships to crash on the planet. As Doyle worries about Luigi's pizza shuttle being banged up, he encounters a green-clawed alien. The alien identifies himself as Mutie, a repairperson, and offers to repair the shuttle for a reduced price since Doyle is Mutie's first customer in 10 years. While the repairs are underway, Doyle delivers the pizzas to Tremble Hall, and the Bonk Bunch continues planning to scare him, and also to steal his delivery money to pay for Beef's own hot rod repairs. Doyle learns that Tingler is not what it seems, and that the Bonk Bunch is far more scared of the species on Tingler.
3	"The Beef Who Would Be King"	Akio Sugino	David Weimers & Ken Koonce	September 27, 1986
After watching a series of practical jokes between Beef and Doyle, aliens from the planet Cholesterol show up, wanting to make Beef their "High Cholesterol." Aimee thinks Doyle would make a better king, so she challenges Beef to a space rally on Doyle's behalf. Doyle wins the race, but since Beef cheated, which is what the aliens wanted, he is made their leader. However, after Professor Icenstein tells Doyle and Milo that every year the Cholesterols find the worst man in the entire galaxy, crown him king, then eat their leader. Doyle and Milo think that Beef may have gotten what he deserved until Aimee convinces Doyle to do the right thing and rescue Beef. When Aimee's space car shorts out, Doyle must get to Cholestorol by himself (during a chase, Cholesterols can be heard chanting "Where's the beef?"). As Doyle is about to be thrown into a canyon, Beef grabs him, causing the Cholesterols to say that he has forfeited his position due to no longer being the worst man in the universe. After their ordeal together, Doyle expects he and Beef will be on better terms, but Beef cannot resist being antisocial again.
4	"Where's Milo?"	Takashi Yamamoto	Eric Lewald & Larry DiTillio	October 4, 1986
A series of accidents causes all of Milo's friends to ostracize him, and then another accident causes Luigi to fire him. So he signs a contract with a store owner named Al Gatori, who is interested in his six arms but it is actually a trick...the fine print has him agreeing to become a living mannequin, and Gatori shoots him with a freeze ray. When they find him, and Gatori shows them the contract, they figure Milo would not have agreed to that willingly. Doyle commands a rescue mission for Milo, but he needs all the group who had snubbed Milo to carry out his plan. Doyle manages to convince them after he makes them all realize that when they were all at one low point or another, it was Milo who was steadily loyal to them.
5	"Those Eyes, Those Lips"	Takashi Yamamoto	Karen Wilson & Chris Weber	October 11, 1986
All the girls are excited that rock star Mick Maggers is going to give a concert at Galaxy High, especially Booey, who is a big fan and has sent him many letters. Unfortunately, the concert is sold out. Aimee decides to help find a way for Booey to meet Mick. Meanwhile, Beef is planning to take Wendy to the concert, and in order to get in, he and his gang get jobs as security for Mick. But a pizza monster has kidnapped Wendy, with whom it apparently had fallen in love. Doyle had to chase the monster down, since he had created it by adding a special ingredient called Tog, given to him by some aliens. Booey sneaks onto Mick's ship, where she meets someone calling himself James, who wants to help her, but asks her what is so great about Mick Maggers, as he is just some guy, and Booey says Mick's music speaks to her. Aimee, Gilda, and Milo continue trying to help Booey, while the Bonk Bunch continue keeping them out. But in the end, James does help everyone, and has a surprise for them...
6	"Doyle's New Friend"	Yuuzou Satou	Jina Bacarr	October 18, 1986
Everyone is getting ready for the Hands Across the Universe Dance, of which they expect Aimee will be voted Queen. Beef plans to become King of the Dance, though no one has voted for him. Meanwhile, Doyle befriends a student from another high school named Wolfgang Armadillos, who has come for the dance. But when Doyle's friends get upset by Wolfgang's pranks, Beef recruits Wolfgang into the Bonk Bunch. They get him to switch ballot boxes in the election for King and Queen, but Wolfgang ends up tricking Beef and winning back Doyle and the others...
7	"Dollars and Sense"	Kazuhide Tomonaga	Ken Koonce & David Weimers	October 25, 1986
At Luigi's, everyone is getting ready for the return of ultra-rich student Reginald Unicycle. Wendy wants him, but when he sees Aimee, he falls for her. She starts dating him, but her friends are suspicious of him, and the Creep is completely jealous. When Ms. McBrain tells him that Reggie has the Midas Touch, he thinks Reggie is going to turn Aimee into gold. He convinces Doyle and the others to go to the Platinum Planet to rescue her, at a party Reggie throws for her at his parents' mansion...where there just happens to be a golden statue that he has had made of her, which the Creep and the others mistake for Aimee. Eventually, Aimee realizes Reggie, who has dated many girls around the galaxy, is not really as interested in her as he thinks he is, so she returns to Galaxy High.
8	"Beach Blanket Blow-Up"	Nobuetsu Andō	Ken Koonce & David Weimers	November 1, 1986
Doyle wants to go with Wendy to Fort Lauderoid for Spring Break, so he tricks Aimee into loaning him her car. She is upset when she learns the truth, but Doyle cannot go anyway, because he failed Professor Icenstein's course, and needs to do a science project to earn enough to pass it. Meanwhile. Reggie takes everyone to the beach on his space yacht. Aimee realizes that she likes him, and Gilda and Booey convince her that he likes her too. Meanwhile, Doyle passes his extra credit work about supernovas, but discovers that Fort Lauderoid's sun is going to go supernova, so he and Icenstein go to warn everyone (though Icenstein melts, so Doyle must carry him in a glass). Aimee thinks Doyle's come to ask her to go steady, but he tells everyone about the supernova; however, everyone thinks that it is a joke at her expense (the episode's title is a parody of the movie Beach Blanket Bingo, starring Frankie Avalon and Annette Funicello, whose names are also parodied in this episode as Frankie Avalunar and Comet Moonicello. In addition, Fort Lauderoid is a parody of Fort Lauderdale).
9	"The Brain Blaster"	Nobuetsu Andō	David Weimers & Ken Koonce	November 8, 1986
Doyle is good at the game of psych-hockey, and the entire school becomes fans when he wins game after game. However, this is also putting him under a great deal of pressure as Doyle is struggling academically and Coach Frogface is demanding that he hit the books, as Galaxy High has had a lousy history at psych-hockey, but now Doyle is their big chance to win a long-awaited championship. A shady character called Punk McThruster offers the use of a Brain Blaster to enhance Doyle's knowledge. Doyle refuses, but after finding a Cosmic Literature test too difficult, he reconsiders. Of course, the first hit of brain waves is free, but after that it gets costly, and Doyle has more tests to pass if he wants to remain eligible to play sports. So he soon has to start stealing to support his new habit. But using the Brain Blaster costs Doyle more than financially, it also takes quite a toll on his mind, making him much dumber than usual in anything other than the subjects that the device enhances for him. Soon he is really messed up, and desperate to keep using the device, not just for classes, but to feed his addiction to it. When Punk's supplier gets busted, he tells Doyle that his only option for finding more brain waves is to go to a dangerous place called South Andromeda. Luckily, his friends had found out from Ollie where he had gone, and show up to rescue him. But when they find out that he has gotten a hold of a jar of brain waves, they dispose of it, which makes Doyle reluctant to play in the psych-hockey championship, believing that he cannot win without the Brain Blaster. However, an ironic turn of events demonstrates to Doyle that using a Brain Blaster is cheating...
10	"The Brat Pack"	Nobuetsu Andō	Marc Scott Zicree	November 15, 1986
Beef gets his hot rod souped up, and uses it to irritate Doyle and his friends, but ends up crashing into the teacher's table outside. So Ms. McBrain punishes him by making him teach a group of elementary school kids, who end up tormenting Beef. He gets them to behave by promising to take them on a field trip to an amusement park called Nova Land, but in order to do so he needs Ms. McBrain's permission to take the kids off campus, to which she has been notoriously stingy in granting. Beef decides to take them anyway, and Aimee, Doyle, and Milo, who are on monitor duty, agree to help...
11	"Founders' Day"	Nobuetsu Andō	Larry DiTillio	November 22, 1986
On Founder's Day, the anniversary of the founding of Galaxy High, Beef chases Doyle, Aimee, Milo, and the Creep into Professor Icenstein's classroom, where they hide inside one of his inventions. Beef and Roland activate the device, which turns out to be a time machine, and Doyle and his friends find themselves in the past, on the barren asteroid Flutor, which is where Galaxy High is located. The Flutorians charge them 5,000 megacredits for "discovering" the place, and if they do not pay, they will destroy the asteroid...which means Doyle and the others would have no return. Then a younger Luigi appears, only his original business was a pancake house and Binny McBrain works as his waitress. Doyle and Milo try to convince Luigi to convert his restaurant to a pizzeria instead, while Aimee finds out that Ms. McBrain would like to be in teaching but her planet restricts women's employment. Aimee sends out a broadcast advertising the place to everyone in the galaxy. However, all of the alien races hate each other, and they are ordered outside by Luigi, where the aliens prepare for war. Meanwhile, the kids are willing to get along (including Blinky Bubblehead, Greta Gossip (who sounds like Wendy Garbo, whose name was a reference to Greta Garbo) as well as Biff Bonk, and aliens resembling Roland and Earl). The fight amongst the adults is broken up by a galaxy cop named Dingy Harry (a reference to Dirty Harry), who likes the idea of a boarding school being built on Flutor with Ms. McBrain as headmistress, and leaves now that everyone has calmed down. However, the Flutorians are starting their destruction! At the last minute Milburn Unicycle appears, who pays the Flutorians and will also agree to build Galaxy High School under one condition: it contain an adjunct elementary school as his toddler son Reggie needs to begin school. Various faculty members also show up, including Professor Icenstein, who helps Milo figure out how to use the time machine to return to the year 1986. When they get home, Ms. McBrain says the gang reminds her of another group she once met, on Founder's Day, who disappeared before she could thank them for their role in founding Galaxy High.
12	"Martian Mumps"	Nobuetsu Andō	Larry DiTillio	November 29, 1986
As class president, Milo has to welcome a new Martian student to Galaxy High, though he is not happy about this because Martians are only interested in rules, to the exclusion of all else. When he touches the new student, he receives an electric shock, which he in turn passes on to everyone else he touches. Milo is not feeling well, so Doyle and Aimee take him back to his room. The next day, they find that everyone in school, both the students and the faculty, have all lost their personalities, caring only about rules. They go to see Professor Icenstein, who had been in his lab all night and so had no contact with anyone. When they describe the situation to him, he says that everyone has caught a disease called Martian Mumps, which transforms aliens into Martians. Doyle and Aimee cannot catch it because Earthlings are immune to it, but for everyone else, permanent Martianization will take place in 24 hours, and it is incurable. Still, they convince Icenstein to try to find a cure. Meanwhile, in an obvious Star Trek parody, the Medi-Federation starship Eagle Eyes (captained by James T. Smirk) shows up to put Galaxy High under eternal quarantine and tow it to Mars (Smirk thinks that the lack of emotion brought on by the disease sounds terrible, but First Officer Splook thinks that it sounds pleasant). Splook and Dr. Splotz tell Smirk that, in order to do so, he would require approval from Medi-Federation Command, and he has not got the authority to carry out his plan, but he seems obsessively anti-Martian. Doyle then unwittingly cures Beef by making him angry, and Icenstein then realizes that playing on an individual's strongest emotion will turn them back to normal, so Doyle, Aimee, and Beef set out to cure their friends and the faculty.
13	"It Came From Earth"	Nobuetsu Andō	Karen Wilson & Chris Weber	December 6, 1986
Galaxy High is in the Zuggleball championships, and Doyle intends to prove that he's a "big man" by winning the game single-handedly. He is doing pretty well, until he gets knocked unconscious. Doyle then wakes up on Earth and realizes that 15 years have passed, in which time he has grown to 400 feet tall. Aimee is a doctor, Milo is President, Beef is a general, Gilda is a reporter, the Creep is a famous singer, Roland is a sheriff (dressed like a Keystone Cop)...and pretty much everyone from Galaxy High is now on Earth (with a few exceptions; Wendy, Reggie, and Ms. McBrain are nowhere to be seen in this episode). Professor Icenstein has been trying to find a cure for Doyle's mysterious growth, and when Doyle wakes up, he takes off to find him. Along the way, he causes a great deal of damage, and the military, led by Beef, is dispatched to stop Doyle. Suddenly, he wakes up as his proper size and realizes that it was a nightmare; in the real world he was knocked out for 15 seconds. Having learned his lesson, Doyle finishes the game, this time being a team player.

== Production notes ==
The animated series Partridge Family 2200 A.D., which debuted in 1974, features Keith and Laurie Partridge going to a futuristic space high school called "Galaxy High," and Laurie's friend Marion Moonglow (a Martian) bears a striking resemblance to the Wendy Garbo character from this series.

Galaxy High School was animated, distributed and owned by TMS Entertainment. TMS produced Galaxy High as an attempt to create a similar series to the hit Japanese anime show Urusei Yatsura (released 1981, based on a 1978 manga) for the American market. While Urusei Yatsura involves an alien girl attending a human high school, the school scenario in Galaxy High is reversed to be based around humans attending a high school for aliens. Due to TMS' involvement, the series is often classified as an anime.

John Kricfalusi was a character designer for the show and went on to create Ren & Stimpy and The Ripping Friends.

Syd Iwanter, the creative director, came up with the concept and hired Kricfalusi to draw a one-sheet pitch featuring the main characters for a proposed HIGH SCHOOL 2525. When Michael Chase Walker became director of children's programs for the CBS Television Network, he bought the show, changed the name to Galaxy High School and convinced up-and-coming screenwriter turned future filmmaker Chris Columbus to develop the show under his name. Walker was trying to develop a Saturday morning schedule that resembled an old-fashioned Saturday movie matinée with a range of horror (Teen Wolf), science fiction (Galaxy High School), comedy (Pee-wee's Playhouse) and Western (Wildfire).

An alternate theme song exists showing clips from various episodes. The theme was changed to an instrumental one. At the end, Aimee speaks "Here we are Doyle! The only two kids from Earth at a high school in outer space! How do you feel?" Doyle responds "A little spaced out, Aimee!"

The show features transportation tubes, which people can enter and be whisked away around the school; these are reminiscent of old-style pneumatic tubes. In Galaxy High, they are known as "wooshers".

The show had been granted two time slots by CBS, for its 1986 and 1987 Saturday mornings, with the expectation of a two-season contract. When the show was not renewed for a second season, CBS elected to rerun the first season in its 1987 time slot, in order to make up for episodes that had been preempted by Saturday sporting events in 1986. Chris Columbus later remarked that CBS had been ambivalent about whether or not there would be a renewal, and had written one script in anticipation of a second season. The sole unproduced episode of Galaxy High concerned cliquish divisions in Galaxy High which start with pranks and food fights, but soon culminate into a school "civil war", causing Galaxy High's board of trustees to notice this and threaten to shut down the school.

=== Film ===
In 1996, Walker optioned the film rights with John H. Williams of Vanguard Films, and reteamed with Chris Columbus to develop the big screen version of Galaxy High School. After various development deals with both DreamWorks and Paramount Pictures, the movie plans remain in limbo.

=== Series tie-in ===
An 85-page paperback book titled Galaxy High School was published in August 1987 by Bantam-Skylark Books and written by Ann Hodgman. It is an adaptation of six episodes, "Welcome to Galaxy High", "Those Eyes, Those Lips", "The Beef Who Would Be King", "Dollars and Sense", "Beach Blanket Blow-Up" and "Founder's Day". In the prologue, it says that Doyle and Aimee, while on Earth, attended Presley High School and its sports team was called the Hound Dogs. It also says that Aimee didn't know Doyle well before coming to Galaxy High, but did think he was cute, until they actually meet when first entering their new school. The paperback is out-of-print and is a highly sought collectible among fans of the show.

=== Airdates ===
Galaxy High School originally aired at 11:00am EST/10:00am CST after Teen Wolf and before CBS Storybreak in the 1986–1987 season on CBS. It was also given a timeslot for the 1987-1988 CBS season in the expectation of a second season, but upon the show's retirement the 1987–1988 schedules re-ran episodes of the first season.

Later airdates: 2 January 1988 – 27 August 1988 on CBS, January 2, 1994–?, July 2, 1994–September 24, 1994, October 8, 1994–December 31, 1994–early 1995, 7 February 1996 – 23 February 1996, April 2, 1996 – April 19, 1996, May 27, 1996–June 17, 1996 on the Sci Fi Channel.

In 1996, the show aired on Nickelodeon on weekday mornings in the United Kingdom. Prior to that, in the early-to-mid 1990's, it aired on ITV's breakfast programmes, TV-AM and later GMTV.

== Awards ==
The show was nominated for a Humanitas Prize for its anti-drug episode "The Brain Blaster".

== Legacy ==
- Galaxy High appears frequently in the 1980s animation magazine cereal:geek.
- The role-playing game Teenagers from Outer Space released in 1987 expanded upon this concept.
- Episode 17 of Space Dandy features a similar setting.

== Home media releases ==
Four episodes of the show were re-edited into a compilation video titled Galaxy High in 1989 by Family Home Entertainment

Galaxy High School has been released in full on DVD. All 13 episodes are available uncut and as they were originally aired, across two volumes, produced and distributed by Media Blasters through their Anime Works imprint.

In the United Kingdom, during 1989, Channel 5 Video released the first two episodes of the television series on video.
