= Fearless (2020 film) =

2020 animated comedy film

- Promotional poster
- Directed by: Cory Edwards
- Screenplay by: Cory Edwards; John Murphy
- Produced by: John H. Williams; Danielle Sterling; Patrick Worlock; Robyn Klein
- Starring: Yara Shahidi; Miles Robbins; Jadakiss
- Edited by: Rob Neal
- Music by: Anne-Kathrin Dern
- Production companies: 3QU Media; Vanguard Animation; Comic Animations
- Distributed by: Netflix
- Release date: August 14, 2020
- Running time: 89 minutes
- Countries: United States; United Kingdom; Canada
- Language: English

Fearless (styled as Fe@rLeSS_) is a 2020 American animated science fiction action comedy film directed by Cory Edwards, written by Cory Edwards and John Murphy. The film was produced by Vanguard Animation, and was released on Netflix on August 14, 2020. Featuring the voices of Gabrielle Union, Jadakiss, Miguel J. Pimentel, Yara Shahidi and Miles Robbins, the story follows two high school seniors as they try to return three babies to the video game they came from after they mysteriously arrive on Earth. The film received mixed reviews.

== Plot ==
Reid, who goes by the username "Fe@rLeSS_" is a teen video gamer who is an expert at the superhero action-adventure video game Planet Master, and has become the first player to reach the second to last level. At this time, the game's protagonist, Captain Darius Lightspeed, reveals he has three children, Kira, Xander, and Titus, all of whom he brought with him. In-game, Reid decides to drop them off at a daycare before finding the final level of the game, where Lightspeed attaches an "interplanetary communicator" to one of the babies so the daycare workers can call Lightspeed in case of emergency. While in daycare, the game's antagonist and Lightspeed's nemesis, Dr. Arcannis steals the babies and imprisons them on his spaceship in order to steal their superpowers so he can conquer Earth.

While in captivity, the babies accidentally use their powers to escape, end up walking into an escape pod and launching it. This starts the final level, and the game informs Reid that to continue, he must "accept the consequences". When Reid does, the pod travels through a wormhole, but he does not notice it send the pod towards Earth in the real world. The United States Armed Forces, headed by General Jayne Blazerhatch, detects the aircraft entering American airspace. The escape pod ends up crashing behind Reid's home. Meanwhile, Melanie, Reid's school partner, arrives at his house to complete a science project together. Melanie and Reid are both shocked to discover the babies who have entered the home, and after a debate on what to do, Reid convinces her the babies came from the game, and they agree to take care of them. Meanwhile, Arcannis has tracked the babies' whereabouts through the wormhole to Reid's home, prompting the military to mobilize.

The following morning, Reid discovers the interplanetary communicator, and gets a call from Lightspeed, who explains that those are his babies and he will track their location to retrieve them, also explaining that Arcannis is after them; one of the babies however throws down the communicator, breaking it and making Lightspeed unable to finish the location tracking. Melanie suggests to Reid they must get away from their home in order to stay safe, and the two do so. Arcannis arrives at the home after they left, vowing to find them. The military later captures Reid, Melanie and the babies, believing the babies to be dangerous aliens. Arcannis proceeds to arrive, and after defeating the military, steals the babies and transports them to his ship.

Reid steals a motorcycle from the military to follow Dr. Arcannis' tracks, and Melanie fixes the interplanetary communicator by wiring it to a military handheld transceiver, allowing them to successfully recontact Lightspeed, fill him in on the situation and enable him to track their location. Reid and Melanie then successfully stowaway on Arcannis' ship, forcing it down into a city, where the military awaits, and Melanie and Reid escape the ship with the babies in an escape pod, landing near the ship in the same city; Arcannis uses the babies’ powers to become a larger and more powerful form of himself, and unleashes his robot airforce which the military is unsuccessful at stopping. As he approaches Melanie and Reid, the babies learn to control their superpowers and fight back, destroying the robot army and defeating Arcannis by destroying an electric device on his neck which gave him the babies‘ powers. Lightspeed arrives after the battle, and is relieved to find that the babies have learned to use their superpowers, also hailing Reid and Melanie as heroes. Lightspeed and his children then return to the video game world.

Later, Reid and Melanie are unwinding from everything they had been put through by having a private dinner together...when a monster from Planet Master shows up, but at this point, the two certainly aren’t afraid to take on the new challenge.

== Cast ==
- Yara Shahidi as Melanie
- Miles Robbins as Reid
- Miguel as Dr. Arcannis
- Jadakiss as Captain Lightspeed
- Tom Kenny as Fleech
- Angie Martinez as Zona Nightweather
- Harland Williams as Elliot aka Buckethead
- Fat Joe as DJ
- Amari McCoy as Kira
- TBA as Xander
- TBA as Titus
- Dwyane Wade as Private Wade
- Gabrielle Union as General Jayne Nadia Blazerhatch
- Susan Sarandon as Mom

== Music ==
=== Soundtrack ===
| No. | Title | Music | Length |
|---|---|---|---|
| 1. | "Magic (Fearless Mix)" | Leegit | 3:15 |
| 2. | "Survivor" | Mel Carter | 2:38 |
| 3. | "Imperfect" | KIA & Anne-Kathrin Dern | 2:54 |
| 4. | "Big Picture" | Goodito Frito, Pariis Noel, Lorenzo Burez & Neek Bucks | 2:53 |
| 5. | "Us Come Together (Real-Enough Remix) (feat. Goodito Frito)" | Mel Carter | 4:15 |
| 6. | "Captain Lightspeed (Original Score)" | Anne-Kathrin Dern | 2:17 |
| 7. | "Time To Be Fearless (Original Score)" | Anne-Kathrin Dern | 4:21 |
| 8. | "Wherever Heroes Are Needed (Original Score)" | Anne-Kathrin Dern | 2:10 |

== Reception ==
Writing for Polygon, Tasha Robinson wrote: "Fearless isn’t terrible, but no one involved seems to have put in a level of effort that feels like they got up off that imaginary couch."

Fearless has 5.0 out of 10 on IMDb.
