= Valiant (film) =

2005 animated comedy film

- North American theatrical release poster
- Directed by: Gary Chapman
- Screenplay by: Jordan Katz; George Webster; George Melrod
- Story by: George Webster
- Produced by: John H. Williams
- Starring: Ewan McGregor; Ricky Gervais; Tim Curry; Jim Broadbent; Hugh Laurie; John Cleese; John Hurt; Pip Torrens; Rik Mayall; Olivia Williams
- Edited by: Jim Stewart
- Music by: George Fenton
- Production company: Vanguard Animation
- Distributed by: Entertainment Film Distributors (United Kingdom); Buena Vista Pictures Distribution (United States and Canada) (Note: Distributed under the Walt Disney Pictures banner.)
- Release dates: 25 March 2005 (United Kingdom); 19 August 2005 (United States)
- Running time: 76 minutes
- Countries: United Kingdom; United States
- Language: English
- Budget: $35 million
- Box office: $61.7 million

Valiant is a 2005 animated war comedy film produced by John H. Williams and directed by Gary Chapman. It is the first feature film by American animation studio Vanguard Animation. The ensemble voice cast includes Ewan McGregor, Ricky Gervais, Tim Curry, Jim Broadbent, Hugh Laurie, John Cleese, John Hurt, Pip Torrens, Rik Mayall, and Olivia Williams. Set in May 1944, the film follows a group of war pigeons during World War II. It was inspired by true stories of hundreds of pigeons that helped the soldiers in the war.

Valiant was animated by C.O.R.E. Feature Animation and released in the United Kingdom on 25 March 2005, and in the United States on 19 August. It received mixed reviews from critics, and grossed $62 million against a $35 million budget.

== Plot ==
In May 1944, during World War II, three Royal Homing Pigeon Service (RHPS) war pigeons led by Mercury are flying across the English Channel carrying a vital message to Great Britain when they are ambushed by a German-affiliated peregrine falcon named General Von Talon, who kills Mercury's comrades and takes him as a prisoner of war.

In West Nestington, a small wood pigeon named Valiant watches an Allied propaganda film at his local bar with his best friend and barman, a seagull named Felix, before a war hero named Wing Commander Gutsy arrives to announce signups for the RHPS will begin the next day in Trafalgar Square. Valiant encounters an uncouth pigeon named Bugsy en route to the square and, in order to escape a pair of magpie thugs he cheated in a shell game, Bugsy signs up, too. The pair are assigned to Squad F, along with an intellectual red pigeon named Lofty and two muscular, yet dimwitted, brothers named Toughwood and Tailfeather. At the recruit training facility, they are placed under Sergeant Monty's command and Valiant develops a crush on the camp's nurse, a dove named Victoria. Meanwhile, Von Talon and his falcon minions, Cufflingk and Underlingk, torture Mercury into revealing the message was sent from Saint Pierre in France.

Gutsy informs Monty the recruits must leave before their training is complete. Bugsy deserts, fearing for his life, but returns as Squad F departs. Their plane is damaged in an anti-aircraft attack and the squad bails out. A technical malfunction traps Gutsy on the plane as it crash-lands.

In France, Squad F meets Charles de Girl and Rollo, two mice from the French Resistance's Mouse Division, who lead them to Saint-Pierre. They are ordered to deliver the same message, but Von Talon's forces attack, capturing Bugsy. Unaware that Squad F followed him to his bunker hideout, Von Talon imprisons Bugsy, intending to kill him after he delivers the message to the Führer. As Squad F reunites with Gutsy, Valiant uses his short stature to infiltrate Von Talon's bunker and rescue Bugsy and Mercury. The falcons discover them during their escape, but Squad F, Mercury, and Gutsy hold off Cufflingk and Underlingk while Valiant flies to London to deliver the message, pursued by Von Talon.

With Felix and his fellow West Nestington residents' help, Valiant subdues Von Talon and successfully delivers the message, which inspires the Allies to change their invasion plans and land in Normandy. Squad F receives the Dickin Medal and celebrates at the West Nestington bar, where Valiant shares a kiss with Victoria. A message is then displayed commending the animals that saved thousands of lives during World War II.

== Voice cast ==
- Ewan McGregor as Valiant, a plucky and optimistic wood pigeon. Although he is the smallest of the war pigeon squad, he is the bravest.
- Ricky Gervais as Bugsy, a slovenly but friendly pigeon who becomes Valiant's best friend.
- Tim Curry as General Von Talon, a cruel German peregrine falcon. He stands out with a big eyepatch over his left eye.
- Olivia Williams as Victoria, a beautiful and kind nursing dove and Valiant's love interest.
- Pip Torrens as Lofty Thaddeus Worthington, a red scholarly pigeon
- Dan Roberts as Tailfeather, a blue pigeon and a member of the war pigeon squad.
- Brian Lonsdale as Toughwood, a tan pigeon, Tailfeather's brother, and a member of the war pigeon squad.
- Hugh Laurie as Wing Commander Gutsy, the lead commander of the RHPS
- Jim Broadbent as Sergeant Monty, the gruff drill sergeant who puts the recruits through strainious training to prepare for fighting against Von Talon.
- John Hurt as Felix, an old seagull and World War I veteran with a peg leg who is the bartender at West Nestington and Valiant's friend.
- Rik Mayall as Cufflingk, a peregrine falcon minion
- Michael Schlingmann as Underlingk, a peregrine falcon minion
- John Cleese as Mercury, a pigeon and prisoner of war.
- Annette Badland as Elsa, Valiant's doting mother who at first does not want her "little egg" to go to war, but lets Valiant go to be the hero he needs to be.
- Sharon Horgan as Charles de Girl, a female mouse who works for the French Resistance
- Jonathan Ross as Big Thug

== Themes ==
Valiant takes the Second World War as its backdrop, and thus the film has various factual references to World War II. McGregor himself called it "a good old-fashioned war movie". The film's use of World War II imagery is apparent throughout; for instance, the villainous characters in the film hold obvious links to the Nazis, although Nazism is never specifically mentioned, nor are Nazi symbols ever overtly visually depicted. Edited symbols are, however, discreetly inserted; for example, General Von Talon wears a large Reichsadler badge that depicts the German eagle, taken from the coat of arms of Germany. Yet this version, unlike the Hoheitszeichen (Nazi Germany's national insignia), has the eagle grasping two bones, whereas the Hoheitszeichen depicts the eagle clutching a swastika. Furthermore, the film's primary antagonist, Von Talon, holds specific links to Adolf Hitler. For example, Von Talon states whilst holding Mercury as a prisoner of war that he would not eat Mercury, as he is a vegetarian, a direct reference to Adolf Hitler's vegetarianism.

== Production ==
=== Development ===
If you think it's Nemo with feathers, then you're wrong. It's easier to create colorful tropical fish, or toys running around a kid's room. Valiant is different. It's set in the Second World War; it's dark, dangerous, yet funny — and that's quite hard.

— Gary Chapman

179 modelers, animators, shaders, texturers began work on Valiant at the west London-based Ealing Studios. It was the second computer-animated film to be made in the United Kingdom, after The Magic Roundabout which premiered months prior to Valiant. John H. Williams of Vanguard Animation said that a lot of European animators who had worked at Pixar Animation Studios, Walt Disney Feature Animation, and DreamWorks Animation were interested in going back to Europe and, unaware of the production of The Magic Roundabout, they hoped to be the first studio to produce a CGI film in Europe. Williams also explained that, while it would have been $3 million cheaper to make in LA, $10–12 million in tax and co-production money was available due to producing the film in Britain. Additionally, the bonus of the location was that the UK Film Council offered Valiant a record-breaking £2.6 million grant. Valiant's budget of $35,000,000 is considered low in comparison to other CGI productions, with films on which Williams had previously worked, such as Shrek 2, having a budget of $150,000,000.

=== Director ===
Gary Chapman made his directorial debut with Valiant. Initially Chapman was hired for character and production design during project development before he was attached to direct the film after extensive work with story development, writers, and producers. Chapman was subsequently storyboard artist, designing characters for the Vanguard Animation film Space Chimps.

=== Animation ===
The animals were clothed under Chapman's orders to create a more distinctive look for each character.

The film, on a tight budget and with a relatively small group of animators, was created in 106 weeks, in what The Times described as "a piece of guerrilla film-making" in comparison to the other CGI animated films created by major studios. At least 5 computer animators worked together for every scene of the 76-minute film, working on effects such as color, movement and shading. As a result of the low number of animators, some critics called the film's animation "amateurish-looking", but other reviewers stated that the film was "nicely animated".

Tom Jacomb, line producer for Vanguard Animation, said that the biggest difficulties whilst making the film was the detail required for the birds' feathers. He stated that "most — no, all — our problems were feathers", and described them as a "misery in computer animation". Director Gary Chapman insisted that each bird must look distinctive, and as a result, the pigeons came in various colors, including beige, blue, yellow, red and grey. He also requested that each bird be dressed in clothing, and clothing accessories appear throughout the film on characters, usually hats, belts, and military medals and, in the case of the villainous Von Talon, a black leather cape. However, before Valiant, Bugsy, Lofty Thaddeus Worthington, Tailfeather, Toughwood complete their military training, they appear entirely clothes-free, equipped with no military regalia.

C.O.R.E. Digital Pictures also provided animation work on the film.

=== Casting ===
By December 2003, Ewan McGregor joined the cast along with Ben Kingsley, Jim Broadbent, Rupert Everett, Hugh Laurie, John Hurt and Ricky Gervais. In April 2004, John Cleese and Tim Curry joined in. Olivia Williams joined in the cast. Kingsley and Everett later dropped out of the film.

=== Distribution ===
On 16 May 2002, the newly formed Odyssey Entertainment announced they had partnered with Ealing Studios to produce the film as a start-up. Odyssey would also take international film sales. After the animation studio opened up as Vanguard, in September 2002 they had signed a four-picture deal with the Walt Disney Studios and Valiant would be the first film under the deal. The deal allowed Disney to secure North American distribution and home video rights to the film, and worldwide licensing rights.

In April 2003, Entertainment Film Distributors was announced to distribute the film in the United Kingdom.

Valiant would become the only film released as part of the deal with The Walt Disney Studios, with Vanguard selling distribution rights to their second film, Happily N'Ever After to Lionsgate in early 2006.

== Soundtrack ==
The musical score was composed by George Fenton and mostly performed by the Royal Philharmonic Orchestra. The orchestral music is in keeping with the military theme of the film, such as through "March of the R.H.P.S.", performed by The Central Band of the Royal Air Force. Tracks were recorded at AIR Recording Studios and at Angel Recording Studios in London and at Right Track Studios, New York. The only track not composed by Fenton is "Shoo-Shoo Baby", performed by R&B girl group Mis-Teeq, originally sung by the popular American wartime group, the Andrews Sisters. Although "Shoo-Shoo Baby" was the only track on the album containing lyrics, it was not the only lyrical track used in the film – "Non, je ne regrette rien" by Édith Piaf is played in one scene in the film, despite it being recorded in 1960, 16 years after 1944, when the film was set.

== Reception ==
=== Box office ===
The film grossed $19,478,106 in the U.S. and $42,268,782 internationally, which puts it at a worldwide total of $61,746,888. The film held the record for lowest box office of a CGI animated film, until this record was later beaten in 2006 by Doogal, the American re-dubbed version of The Magic Roundabout.

=== Critical reception ===
Valiant received mixed reviews from critics. The film received a 32% "rotten" rating on Rotten Tomatoes based on 114 reviews with an average rating of 5/10. The site's consensus reads: "Valiant has a good collection of voice talents, but the story is strictly by-the-numbers". On Metacritic, the film has a 45 out of 100 based on 27 critic reviews indicating "mixed or average reviews".
