= Vivo (film) =

2021 film by Kirk DeMicco

- Release poster
- Directed by: Kirk DeMicco
- Screenplay by: Kirk DeMicco; Quiara Alegría Hudes
- Story by: Peter Barsocchini; Quiara Alegría Hudes
- Produced by: Lisa Stewart; Michelle L.M. Wong; Rich Moore
- Starring: Lin-Manuel Miranda; Ynairaly Simo; Zoe Saldaña; Juan de Marcos; Brian Tyree Henry; Gloria Estefan
- Cinematography: Yong Duk Jhun
- Edited by: Erika Dapkewicz
- Music by: Alex Lacamoire
- Production companies: Columbia Pictures; Sony Pictures Animation; One Cool Films; Laurence Mark Productions
- Distributed by: Netflix
- Release date: July 30, 2021
- Running time: 95 minutes
- Country: United States
- Language: English
- Box office: $1.3 million

Vivo is a 2021 American animated musical comedy film directed by Kirk DeMicco and written by DeMicco and Quiara Alegría Hudes. The film includes original songs written by Lin-Manuel Miranda, who also serves as executive producer and voices Vivo, and also features the voices of Ynairaly Simo, Zoe Saldaña, Juan de Marcos, Brian Tyree Henry and Gloria Estefan. The story follows Vivo, a music-loving kinkajou, who embarks on the journey of a lifetime to fulfill his destiny and who must deliver a love song to Marta Sandoval, a retiring singer.

The film was first pitched to DreamWorks Animation in 2010 by Miranda following the success of his stage musical In the Heights, but was canceled due to the restructuring at the company in 2015. It was later revived and fast-tracked in December 2016 by Sony Pictures Animation. Cast members for the film were announced in April 2021. Alongside Miranda's original songs, his longtime collaborator and musical director Alex Lacamoire composed the film's score.

Vivo was released in select theaters on July 30, 2021, and digitally on Netflix on August 6, 2021. The film received generally positive reviews from critics.

== Plot ==
In Havana, Cuba, Andrés Hernández and his kinkajou Vivo play music together in the plaza. One day after their show, Andrés receives a letter from his old friend, Marta Sandoval, informing him that she is retiring from her music career. The letter offers a chance to reconnect in Miami, at the Mambo Cabana and for Andrés to finally confess his love for Marta through a song he wrote just for her; but Vivo, happy with their life in Cuba, is reluctant to help. The next morning, Andrés dies in his sleep and that night, a funeral service is held in the plaza, with Andrés' niece-in-law Rosa and her ten-year-old daughter Gabi attending before they head back to their home in Key West, Florida.

Ashamed of his earlier reluctance, Vivo vows himself to get Marta to hear Andrés' song. He stows away to Key West with Gabi and Rosa in their luggage. Gabi finds Vivo and agrees to help him deliver Andrés' song to Marta. Under the guise of attending a cookie sale in town, Gabi and Vivo purchase bus tickets to get to Marta's show, but they are stopped by the Sand Dollars, a girl scout troop who wants Vivo vaccinated. Gabi and Vivo escape from them, but miss the bus. They end up in the Everglades and are separated by a heavy rain storm, losing the song.

While searching for Gabi, Vivo comes across a roseate spoonbill named Dancarino, who is unsuccessful in finding love with one of his own. With Vivo's help, he is able to win the heart of Valentina. The two later rescue Vivo from a Burmese python named Lutador. Meanwhile, Gabi discovers that she was followed by the Sand Dollars on a boat and that they have Andrés' song, keeping it from her until she leads them to Vivo. When the girls are attacked by Lutador, Vivo saves them, but the song is destroyed in the process. Devastated, Vivo considers returning to Cuba until he realizes he and Gabi can recreate the song, as he knows the melody and Gabi knows the lyrics. Together, they make it to Miami and search for Marta, who has learned of Andrés' death and refuses to go on stage.

Gabi and Vivo sneak inside the Mambo Cabana, but Gabi is unable to enter and tells Vivo to go on without her. She is soon caught by security and her furious mother. Vivo finds a mourning Marta, who recognizes him from Andrés' obituary photo, and delivers the song. Touched by the song, Marta is revitalized and decides to go on stage. Vivo then locates Gabi and Rosa, who are arguing while driving back home. Gabi tearfully confesses she decided to help Vivo because she misses her deceased father Carlos and that she never got to tell him she loved him before he passed. Deeply moved, Rosa reassures her daughter of her father's love for her, and drives Gabi and Vivo back to the concert just in time to hear Marta play Andrés' song. Vivo decides to stay in Florida with Gabi and Rosa. Gabi and Vivo put on their own show in Key West with Marta, entertaining the crowd.

== Voice cast ==
- Lin-Manuel Miranda as Vivo, a singer-musician kinkajou
- Zoe Saldaña as Rosa Hernández, Gabi's widowed mother and Andrés' niece-in-law. Rosa is intensely frusterated with Gabi’s outrageously quirky and rebellious behavior, but still cares about her daughter.
- Juan de Marcos González as Andrés Hernández, Vivo's owner and Gabi's grand-uncle
  - González reprises his role in the Spanish dub of the film
- Brian Tyree Henry and Nicole Byer as Dancarino and Valentina, a pair of star-crossed roseate spoonbills
  - Aneesa Folds provides Valentina's singing voice
- Michael Rooker as Lutador, a green Burmese python who dislikes any noise
- Ynairaly Simo as Gabi Hernández, Andrés' grand-niece, an energetic, but eccentric and misunderstood 10-year-old with a gift of gab and rapping
- Gloria Estefan as Marta Sandoval, Andrés' old partner and unrequited love, who is now a legendary singer performing in the United States
- Katie Lowes, Olivia Trujillo, and Lidya Jewett as Becky, Eva, and Sarah; the Sand Dollars, a trio of well-meaning but overzealous girl scout troopers
  - Bri Holland, Alana de Fonseca, and Jada Banks-Mace provide their singing voices
- Christian Ochoa as Montoya, Andrés's friend
- Brandon Jeffords as Mr. Henshaw, a Sand Dollars customer
- Gloria Calderón Kellett as Gloria, Marta's stage manager
- Leslie David Baker as Bob, a Florida bus driver

== Production ==
The film's origins trace back to 2010, when DreamWorks Animation approached Lin-Manuel Miranda to pitch the film following the success of his stage musical In the Heights. Due to a restructuring in 2015, DreamWorks eventually dropped the project. On December 14, 2016, Sony Pictures Animation acquired the project from DreamWorks and fast-tracked it under the name Vivo, which was based on an original idea by Peter Barsocchini, with Kirk DeMicco directing, Lisa Stewart producing, Laurence Mark executive-producing, and Quiara Alegría Hudes writing the screenplay from a story by Barsocchini. On June 12, 2019, Kristine Belson announced at the 2019 Annecy International Animated Film Festival that Rich Moore would join the film as co-producer of the film with Roger Deakins serving as the film's visual consultant. The 2D development was handled by James Baxter while the main animation is handled by Sony Pictures Imageworks. The cast was announced on April 26, 2021.

== Music ==
On December 14, 2016, it was revealed that Miranda would be writing 11 songs for the film. On April 26, 2021, it was reported that Miranda's recurring collaborator Alex Lacamoire worked on the film as both its score composer and executive music producer. The film's soundtrack features "My Own Drum (Remix)", performed by Ynairaly Simo and Missy Elliott. The score was recorded at Synchron Stage Vienna. Music by Noa Kalos was used.

== Release ==
On December 14, 2016, the film was scheduled to be theatrically released on December 18, 2020. On January 26, 2018, the film's theatrical release date was moved a month earlier, to November 6, 2020. On November 1, 2019, the film's theatrical release date was moved to April 16, 2021, only to be delayed to June 4, 2021, as a result of the COVID-19 pandemic. On April 26, 2021, Sony announced the cancellation of the film's theatrical release and licensed the film rights to Netflix, with Sony retaining home entertainment, linear TV, and Chinese distribution rights. The film was released in select theaters on July 30, 2021, and on Netflix on August 6, 2021.

=== Home media ===
Vivo was released on Blu-ray, DVD, and Digital HD on August 9, 2022, by Sony Pictures Home Entertainment.

== Reception ==
=== Streaming viewership ===
Vivo was the highest viewed film on Netflix in the month of August, with 493 million minutes in its first full week, translating to roughly 5.7 million viewings for the week of August 2 to August 9. Netflix announced in its Q3 2021 earnings call that 46 million accounts had sampled the movie.

=== Critical response ===
On Rotten Tomatoes, 86% of 104 critics have given the film a positive review with an average score of 6.8/10. The films critical consensus reads: "Vivo offers few surprises, but this attractively animated adventure is enlivened by the catchy songs contributed by star Lin-Manuel Miranda." On Metacritic, the film has a weighted average score of 66 out of 100, based on 22 critics, indicating "generally favorable reviews".

Maya Phillips of The New York Times praised Miranda's singing and said "Miranda's songs incorporate his signature rapid-fire rapping, along with quick tempo changes and genre mash-ups. Gabi's song, "My Own Drum," with its grade-school Nicki Minaj-esque rap and auto-tune, is the jam I didn't know I needed in my life. Vivo has cuteness to spare, even if the rest is hit or miss. But, we all know, the beat goes on." Brian Lowry of CNN also concurred with Phillips and said "Lin-Manuel Miranda brings his stage-honed chops to another animated movie in Vivo, a sweet if slight love story built around an inordinately resourceful kinkajou. Premiering on Netflix, Miranda's songs elevate a small-boned effort—call it cute, without that being pejorative—with an unabashedly romantic streak." Benjamin Lee of The Guardian rated the film 3 stars out of 5 and wrote, "while Vivo shares the expensive sheen and general good nature of Sony's last hand-me-down, it falls short on just about everything else, a sweet and colourful musical adventure that isn't quite sweet and colourful enough, coasting on simple pleasures that fade as soon as the music stops."

Petrana Radulovic of Polygon was more critical about the film, and said in her review that while the music was "definitely one of the film's highlights," the musical deviations in the film makes it feel "like an animated version of a Hamilton outtake." She went on to praise the animation and visual style of the film, stating it "all meshes together in a beautiful symphony," but criticized the story. David Ehrlich of IndieWire gave the film a C grade and wrote "It's a fun premise for a great adventure, and a valuable lesson for kids who are liable to get blindsided by the realization that 'now' is not 'forever.' The only problem is that Vivo grows increasingly generic and forgettable as the film goes on, and the closer its furry hero gets to finding a silver lining, the more viewers wish that he never went looking for one at all." Peter Debruge of Variety also gave the film a somewhat positive review, saying "the film boasts the rich, professional look of first-rate computer animation, even if Vivo plays by a more conventional stylebook than [Sony Pictures Animation's] recent breakthroughs The Mitchells vs. the Machines and Spider-Man: Into the Spider-Verse. The character designs are fine, if not especially inspired."

=== Accolades ===
Award	Date of ceremony	Category	Nominee(s)	Result	Ref.
Hollywood Music in Media Awards	November 17, 2021	Original Score — Animated Film	Alex Lacamoire	Nominated	
People's Choice Awards	December 7, 2021	Favorite Family Movie	Vivo	Nominated	
Celebration of Cinema and Television	December 19, 2021	Film Music Award	Vivo	Won	
St. Louis Gateway Film Critics Association Awards	December 19, 2021	Best Animated Film	Vivo	Nominated	
Visual Effects Society Awards	March 8, 2022	Outstanding Created Environment in an Animated Feature	Bertrand Bry-Marfaing, Josef Dylan Swift, Geeta Basantani, Jeremy Kim (for Mambo Cabana)	Nominated	
Annie Awards	March 12, 2022	Best FX - Feature	Martin Furness, Lucy Maxian, Nachiket Pujari, Theodor Vandernoot and Stephanie Molk	Nominated	
Annie Awards	March 12, 2022	Best Character Design - Feature	Joe Moshier	Nominated	
Annie Awards	March 12, 2022	Best Music - Feature	Alex Lacamoire, Lin-Manuel Miranda	Nominated	
Annie Awards	March 12, 2022	Best Production Design - Feature	Carlos Zaragoza, Wendell Dalit and Andy Harkness	Nominated	
Annie Awards	March 12, 2022	Best Storyboarding - Feature	Carlos Romero	Nominated	
Satellite Awards	April 2, 2022	Best Animated or Mixed Media Feature	Vivo	Nominated	
