= Space Chimps =

2008 animated comic science fiction film

- Theatrical release poster
- Directed by: Kirk DeMicco
- Screenplay by: Kirk DeMicco; Rob Moreland
- Story by: Kirk DeMicco
- Produced by: Barry Sonnenfeld; John H. Williams
- Starring: Andy Samberg; Cheryl Hines; Jeff Daniels; Patrick Warburton; Kristin Chenoweth; Stanley Tucci
- Cinematography: Jericca Cleland
- Edited by: Debbie Berman
- Music by: Chris Bacon; Blue Man Group
- Production company: Vanguard Animation
- Distributed by: Starz Animation (through 20th Century Fox, North America); Entertainment Film Distributors (United Kingdom)
- Release date: July 18, 2008
- Running time: 81 minutes
- Countries: United States; United Kingdom; Canada
- Language: English
- Budget: $37 million
- Box office: $64.8 million

Space Chimps is a 2008 animated comic science fiction film directed by Kirk DeMicco (in his directorial debut), who wrote the screenplay with Rob Moreland. It features the voices of Andy Samberg, Cheryl Hines, Jeff Daniels, Patrick Warburton, Kristin Chenoweth, and Stanley Tucci.

The film follows three chimpanzees who ventures through planet Malgor. 20th Century Fox theatrically released the film on July 18, 2008. It received mostly negative reviews from critics and grossed $64.8 million on a $37 million budget. It also received an Artios Award nomination for Outstanding Achievement in Casting – Animation Feature. A video game based on the film was also released in July 2008.

A direct-to-video sequel, titled Space Chimps 2: Zartog Strikes Back, was released on May 28, 2010, to cinemas in the United Kingdom by Entertainment Film Distributors and was released on DVD on October 5, 2010, in the United States by 20th Century Fox Home Entertainment.

== Plot ==
In outer space, an uncrewed, intelligent life-searching NASA space probe, Infinity, is dragged into an intergalactic wormhole and crash-lands on the other side of the galaxy. It lands on an Earth-like alien planet named Malgor, populated by colorful fishmen-like beings. Zartog, a tyrannical inhabitant, accidentally discovers how to take manual control of the onboard machinery and uses it to enslave the population. Faced with the possible extinction of Infinity and their budget, the scientists hire multiple chimpanzees as astronauts to regain contact with the probe and retrieve it: technical genius Comet, lieutenant Luna and commander Titan. The Senator adds Ham III, grandson of Ham, the first chimpanzee in space to the team, who works as a cannonball at a circus in company of Houston, a friend of Ham III's grandfather. Ham III is uninterested in the mission, but despite his best attempts to escape, he is launched into space.

Ham, Luna and Titan enter the wormhole, where the latter two pass out from the pressure, leaving Ham with the task of getting the ship out and landing it. They arrive on Malgor and the ship and Titan are taken by the henchmen of Zartog. Titan, unaware of Zartog's agenda, teaches him about the probe's features. Ham and Luna journey to Zartog's palace. Ham reveals that he believes Space Chimps is a joke which makes Luna angry at him. They meet a big-headed alien named Kilowatt, whose head glows when she gets scared. They go into a valley of the aliens' food where they meet some small, spherical creatures called globhoppers, which arrange themselves into a duplicate of Ham and copy his every move, and then they go into the cave of the Flesh-Devouring Beast. Kilowatt volunteers to distract the beast so Luna and Ham can escape, and is devoured in the process. They then go inside the Dark Cloud of Id, which they fall out of. Once at the palace, they rescue Titan and plan to leave. However, Ham, Luna and Titan alter their course of action after noticing Zartog torturing the inhabitants by having them frozen in a pool of freznar, feeling they owe it to Kilowatt to stop Zartog. They abandon the ship, which returns home on autopilot.

Zartog attacks the chimpanzees with the probe and threatens to freeze them all, but Titan tricks him into activating the probe's ejection mechanism, which launches Zartog into the pool of freznar and freezes him. Kilowatt, who has survived, frees the chimps. The chimps re-establish contact with Houston and Comet to discuss their prospects on leaving. By Ham's suggestion and with help from Malgor's inhabitants, they manage to engineer a ship from the probe's constituents, launching it through a volcanic eruption while using the frozen Zartog as their nose cone.

Before they re-enter the wormhole, Titan hands the controls over to Ham. Though Ham becomes skeptical once more, he is reassured by a vision of his grandfather and steers it out of the wormhole. Comet advises him to decrease the ship's entry angle, and the ship starts spinning out, though Luna recovers in time to aid Ham. The repurposed mechanical arms soon fail, and the Zartog nose cone detaches in the atmosphere, damaging one of the ship's fins while Comet and Houston appropriate an HEMTT to prepare for the ship's arrival. Since Ham needs to fly and Titan is still out, Luna climbs out to repair it. She succeeds and Ham regains control as the ship passes a media conference, but Luna loses her grip and is seemingly killed. Ham nearly crashes the ship and one of the arms break off, but he manages to successfully land it on the HEMTT. He leaves the ship and finds Luna merely knocked out. Moments later, Houston, Comet and Titan catch up with them. Attracted by the commotion, the scientist, Senator and media discover the ship and the chimps. Under pressure from the press, the Senator decides to dramatically increase the space program's funding instead of cutting it. Subsequently, the scientists celebrate their return.

Zartog is later revealed to have landed in front of a suburban residence, as a Dachshund then urinates on him after he leaves the ship.

== Voice cast ==
- Andy Samberg as Ham III, Ham I's grandson and a circus chimpanzee who loves cannon acts and crashing.
- Cheryl Hines as Luna, Titan's lieutenant who is fearless and intelligent and Ham's love interest.
- Patrick Warburton as Titan, the flamboyant commander of the expedition. He has a great love of chimpanzee puns.
- Jeff Daniels as Zartog, an alien tyrant who enslaves the planet Malgor.
- Kristin Chenoweth as Kilowalawhizasahooza (Kilowatt for short), an alien who befriends Ham and Luna.
- Carlos Alazraqui as Houston, a friend of Ham's grandfather; and Piddles the Clown.
- Zack Shada as Comet, a technical genius chimp.
- Stanley Tucci as The Senator
- Omid Abtahi as Dr. Jagu
- Patrick Breen as Dr. Bob
- Jane Lynch as Dr. Poole
- Kath Soucie as Dr. Smothers
- Kenan Thompson as The Ringmaster, the owner of a circus where Ham III works.
- Wally Wingert as Splork, Infinity Probe, and Pappy Ham
- Tom Kenny as Newsreel
- Jason Harris as Guard

== Production ==
In 2002, Kirk DeMicco conceived a film premise of anthropomorphic chimpanzees on a spaceship from viewing The Right Stuff (1983), a fictional depiction of the Mercury Seven program. It included the line, "Does a monkey know he's sitting on top of a rocket that might explode?" which made him wonder what happened if the monkey knew. Shortly after the lightbulb moment, he saw the famous space chimpanzee Ham on the cover of a 1961 issue of Life magazine; the chimpanzee's smug expression gave him the idea of a self-centered protagonist going on a dangerous space mission. Using the Life magazine issue with him, DeMicco pitched his ideas to John H. Williams, comparing the plot to that of Tommy Boy (1995). Williams was instantly hooked and began working with him from there. They later decided on "a great sci-fi adventure" for children that was also a mocking of science fiction media in the same way the Shrek films, which Williams also produced, parodied fairy tales. DeMicco wanted the planet to have the vibe of the Mos Eisley cantina of the Star Wars series.

The project and its title, Space Chimps, were first publicized in a Variety article on June 7, 2004, announcing it was next in Vanguard's production line after Valiant (2005). The film was produced in two years by Williams' Vanguard Animation studio with a team of around 170, a $37 million budget, and DeMicco as director. For the film, a new pipeline was created, as well as a studio constructed in Vancouver. Chris Bacon was chosen as composer, who was recommended to DeMicco by James Newton Howard. The limited budget meant creative choices had to be made for the music to sound interesting; according to DeMicco, beds were occasionally used alongside the orchestra, and the Blue Man Group played PVC pipes.

== Release ==
On April 11, 2006, 20th Century Fox signed a deal with Vanguard minority owner IDT Entertainment to distribute four films, the second in line being Space Chimps.

Space Chimps was originally set to be released on May 2, 2008, but on December 19, 2007, the movie's release date was changed to July 18, 2008. This was mainly because of the 2007–08 Writers Guild of America strike.

== Reception ==
=== Critical response ===
On the review aggregator website Rotten Tomatoes, 33% of 89 critics' reviews are positive, with an average rating of 4.6/10. The website's consensus reads: "Space Chimps' cheap animation and overabundance of monkey puns feels especially dated in a post-Wall-E world." Metacritic, which uses a weighted average, assigned the film a score of 36 out of 100, based on 18 critics, indicating "generally unfavorable" reviews. Audiences polled by CinemaScore gave the film an average grade of "B+" on an A+ to F scale.

Roger Ebert gave a positive review of three stars and said in his review that "Space Chimps is delightful from beginning to end."

Neil Genzlinger of The New York Times said that Space Chimps was "hilarious".

Lael Loewenstein of Variety called it "fairly fatuous but enjoyably slim family entertainment".

=== Box office ===
The film has grossed $30.1 million in the United States, and $34.7 million in other countries, totalling $64.8 million worldwide. The film was released in the United Kingdom on August 1, 2008, and opened on #7, grossing £563,543.

On its opening weekend, Space Chimps was number seven with a gross of $7.1 million in 2,511 theatres, with a $2,860 average; it was a poor opening for the film, debuting on (at the time) the highest-grossing box office weekend ever in the United States.

=== Awards ===
List of awards and nominations
Award	Category	Nominee	Result
Artios Award	Outstanding Achievement in Casting - Animation Feature	Matthew Jon Beck	Nominated

=== Home media ===
20th Century Home Entertainment released Space Chimps on DVD and Blu-ray on November 25, 2008.

== Video game ==
A video game based on the film was released in July 2008, published by Brash Entertainment and developed by Redtribe, Wicked Witch Software and WayForward Technologies.

== Sequel ==
Space Chimps 2: Zartog Strikes Back was released on May 28, 2010, to cinemas in the United Kingdom by Entertainment Film Distributors and was released on DVD on October 5, 2010, in the United States by 20th Century Fox Home Entertainment. It was universally panned by critics and grossed just over $4 million during its theatrical run. Tucci, who voiced one of the supporting characters Senator in the sequel, would later consider it the worst film he ever done in his filmography.

== See also ==
- Space Chimps 2: Zartog Strikes Back
- Space Chimps (video game)
