= Noa Kalos =

American mycologist, musician and TikToker

Noa Kalos, or MycoLyco, is an American mushroom enthusiast, musician and TikToker.

== Music and social media ==
According to Rolling Stone, Kalos is a "mushroom-obsessed electronic musician". She makes music by connecting various mushrooms to synthesizers, calling it "a creative collaboration between humans, mushrooms, and machines." Nerdist commented in 2021 that "... it's certainly an acquired taste. There isn’t really any rhythm or melody to speak of, let alone anything that sounds vaguely like harmonizing. ... Although hearing the shrooms “talk” to each other ... is kind of enthralling."

A video she posted on YouTube in 2020, "Five Minutes of Pink Oyster Mushroom Playing Modular Synthesizer", had more than a million views. Mixdown magazine said "... might just be our favourite YouTube video released this year." In 2021 she live streamed a "mushroom concert" using blue oyster mushrooms. As of 2023, she has around 700 000 followers on TikTok.

Her music appeared in the 2021 musical comedy film Vivo. Fashion designer Stella McCartney used Kalos' music in 2022 when she presented a line of mushroom leather bags at a Paris Fashion Week show.

== Personal life ==
Kalos grew up in Massachusetts and studied art at Oberlin College, Ohio. As of 2021, she is married with two children and lives in North Carolina.

== See also ==
- Fungi in art
