= Happily N'Ever After =

2006 animated film by Paul J. Bolger

- Theatrical release poster
- Directed by: Paul J. Bolger
- Written by: Rob Moreland
- Based on: Fairy tales by; Brothers Grimm; Hans Christian Andersen; Simsala Grimm by; André Sikojev; Stefan Beiten; Claus Clausen
- Produced by: John H. Williams; Michael Hefferon; J. Chad Hammes
- Starring: Sarah Michelle Gellar; Freddie Prinze Jr.; Andy Dick; Wallace Shawn; Patrick Warburton; George Carlin; Sigourney Weaver
- Cinematography: David Dulac
- Edited by: Ringo Hess
- Music by: Paul Buckley
- Production companies: Berliner Film Companie; Berlin Animation Film; Odyssey Entertainment; Vanguard Animation
- Distributed by: Lionsgate Films
- Release dates: December 16, 2006 (Westwood, California); January 5, 2007 (United States)
- Running time: 87 minutes
- Countries: Germany; United States
- Languages: German; English
- Budget: $47 million
- Box office: $38 million

Happily N'Ever After is a 2006 animated fantasy adventure comedy film directed by Paul J. Bolger, produced by John H. Williams, and written by Rob Moreland. It is inspired by fairy tales of the Brothers Grimm and Hans Christian Andersen and loosely based on the 1999 animated German television series Simsala Grimm. The title is the opposite of a stock phrase, happily ever after; the name is contracted with an apostrophe between the N and the E. The film stars the voices of Sarah Michelle Gellar, Freddie Prinze, Jr., Andy Dick, Wallace Shawn, Patrick Warburton, George Carlin, and Sigourney Weaver. The film was one of Carlin's final works before his death in 2008.

Lionsgate theatrically released Happily N'Ever After in the United States on January 5, 2007. The film was panned by critics for its animation, voice acting and humor. It grossed $38 million worldwide against a production budget of $47 million. Despite its negative reviews and poor performance, it was followed by a direct-to-video sequel in 2009 called Happily N'Ever After 2: Snow White—Another Bite @ the Apple.

== Plot ==
The story begins with the idea that the Wizard controls all of the fairy tales and governs the Scales of Good and Evil, an artifact that maintains the balance of all good and evil in Fairy Tale Land. With the help of his assistants, the uptight Munk and the rascally Mambo, the Wizard checks to make sure that all the fairy tales under his care are "on track" to have their traditional happy endings. However, the Wizard announces his leave for Scotland for a little vacation, so he leaves the kingdom and its stories in the hands of Munk and Mambo. Though Munk intends to have the stories go by their traditional endings, Mambo desires for the characters to break free of their pre-destined fates and choose different endings.

Right after the Wizard's leave, both Mambo and Munk fulfill their duties by watching over the story of Cinderella taking place. As per tradition, known as Ella, the character lives as a servant to her haughty stepmother, Frieda, and her equally mean stepsisters. Too fearful to stand up for herself, Ella often dreams of the Prince who will rescue her from her life and sweep her off her feet. However, unknown to Ella, she is pined after by her best friend Rick, a servant of the Prince, and the Prince in question is buffoonish and chauvinistic. As a result of Rick's efforts, Ella is invited alongside her stepfamily to the ball, but Frieda refuses to let the girl go. Fortunately, the Fairy Godmother arrives and grants Ella a gorgeous dress, as well as glass slippers to wear, on the condition she returns home before midnight.

However, the fairy tale suddenly falls off-track during the ball when Munk and Mambo's shenanigans attract Freida to the Wizard's lair, leading to her stealing his Staff and discover his book of fairy tales. Once she realizes what will happen to her if Ella succeeds in marrying the Prince, she unbalances the Scales, causing multiple fairy tales to go wrong and have unhappy endings, including Ella's. She summons an army of Trolls, evil witches, three Big Bad Wolves, the Giant, and Rumpelstiltskin to her castle. Ella finds out and tries to enlist Rick's help, but Rick, frustrated with her affection for the Prince, refuses, so she escapes to the woods where she meets the exiled Munk and Mambo. They both explain the situation to her and decide to find the Prince (who, unaware of Ella's identity, is searching for his "mystery maiden"), in hopes that he will defeat Frieda. Meanwhile, Frieda sets her villainous army out to capture Ella, causing Rick to have a change of heart and go rescue her.

The trio find the Seven Dwarfs' home, only to discover Frieda's army waiting there for an attack. The Seven Dwarfs help the trio defend themselves from the attackers, and they successfully escape with the help of Rick. Unfortunately, after the battle, Rick and Ella have another falling-out over the Prince, with Rick insisting the Prince is not the hero they need. Ella refuses to believe his claims and leaves him so she can find the Prince herself, but after listening to Munk and Mambo's retelling of her original story, Ella grows uncertain if that is what she wants in life, suddenly realizing Rick's feelings for her. With some encouragement from Mambo, Ella decides to go after Rick. However, Frieda, angered by her army's inability to capture Ella, decides to go after her herself. Frieda succeeds in kidnapping Ella, but Rick, Mambo, and Munk manage to sneak into the castle to rescue Ella, and together the foursome enter a battle with Frieda over the staff.

During the struggle, Frieda knocks Rick out with a blast from the staff, but she accidentally creates a portal and loses the staff as she struggles to fight against Ella. Ella, finally fed up with Frieda's treatment of her, punches her in the rift, banishing her from Fairy Tale Land forever and setting the stories back in place. After Rick wakes up, he and Ella both confess their feelings for each other, while the imprisoned fairy tale characters (including the Prince) drive out the villains.

With the Scales tipped back into balance and the kingdom regained, Ella and Rick decide to choose their own destinies in a world of happy endings and get married, while a few other fairy tale characters (including the reformed Rumplestiltskin) start to follow suit. Finally, the Wizard returns from vacation, and both Munk and Mambo agree not to tell him about the events that occurred.

In the mid-credits, Frieda is shown trapped in the Arctic surrounded by love-struck elephant seals.

== Cast ==
- Sigourney Weaver as Frieda, Cinderella's power-hungry stepmother and the main antagonist. She takes over Fairy Tale Land by rigging the Scales of Good and Evil and takes the Wizard's staff for more power.
- Sarah Michelle Gellar as Ella, a beautiful, humble and sweet girl and the scullery maid from the tale "Cinderella" and the protagonist of the film. She was formerly in love with the Prince but later realized that her true love is her friend Rick.
- Andy Dick as Mambo, a rebellious purple cat who works for the Wizard. Bored with the cycle of good endings, he wishes for things to go differently every once in a while but relents when he sees how far out of control things went.
- Wallace Shawn as Munk, an uptight and smart orange pig who also works for the Wizard. Unlike Mambo, he avoids causing trouble in the fairy tales'. He helps Ella stop Frieda from taking over fairy tale land. Although he and Mambo argue, they're best friends.
- Freddie Prinze Jr. as Rick, a handsome and stressed-out servant who works for the prince and finds him as a grand annoyance. He dreams of marrying Ella, enchanted by her beauty and wonders what she sees in the prince at all.
- Patrick Warburton as the Prince, the prince of the Cinderella story. Unlike the original prince, he is somewhat lazy and ignorant, but is determined to find his "maiden", Cinderella. He follows steps in a tiny booklet he carries around. The Prince's name is revealed to be Humperdink which is only mentioned in a deleted scene on the DVD release.
- Michael McShane as Rumpelstiltskin, the titular character from the tale "Rumpelstiltskin". He takes the baby from the miller's daughter after Frieda tampers with the Scales of Good and Evil on the scales and assists her.
- George Carlin as the Wizard, an unnamed ancient wizard who watches over the fairy tales of Fairy Tale Land making sure they go by the book and balances the Scales of Good and Evil to make sure they go well. He leaves his assistants in charge while he goes on vacation in Scotland.
- John DiMaggio as the Giant, the giant from "Jack and the Beanstalk".
- Tom Kenny, Rob Paulsen, and Philip Proctor as Three Amigos, cooks who are friends of Rick.
- John DiMaggio and Tom Kenny as dwarves and trolls.
- Kath Soucie and Jill Talley as stepsisters and Little Red Riding Hood.
- Tress MacNeille and Jill Talley as witches.
- Tom Kenny and Jon Polito as two out of the three Big Bad Wolves. The Fat Wolf that is voiced by Polito is based on the Big Bad Wolf from "The Three Little Pigs", the Tough Wolf that is voiced by Kenny is based on the Big Bad Wolf from "Little Red Riding Hood", and the Crazy Wolf is the runt of the litter and doesn't speak.
- Lisa Kaplan as the fairy godmother.

== Production ==
=== Early development as a Simsala Grimm feature film ===
In 2000, Berlin Animation Film (a subsidiary of Dresdner Bank) wanted to invest their funds (allocating at $100,000,000) in animated projects, and were interested in using the funds on a film adaptation of Simsala Grimm. Greenlight Media was looking to sell the series to the United States, so they partnered with Berlin Animation Film and John H. Williams of Vanguard Animation to produce the film. Williams told writer Rob Moreland about the film, to which Moreland suggested that the story would revolve around the Wizard going on vacation and Yoyo and Doc Croc messing up the fairy tales' happy endings, which would result in the villains, led by Cinderella's stepmother, causing mayhem and taking over the land of Simsala.

The film was to be produced in traditional animation like the series, only with the art style and backgrounds based on the art of Dutch painters to give it a storybook feel. Hahn Film AG, which helped produce the animation for the first season of Simsala Grimm, was set to provide lead animation production. Animators and concept artists were hired in early 2001. The concept artists, including Mariano Gabriel Vidal, Sahin Ersoz, Ralph Niemeyer and Paul J. Bolger, produced early designs and storyboards for the film. Niemeyer spent 2001 working alone on his designs while the story was still being developed. In addition to concept designs, Bolger helped Hahn Film train their crew to international standards.

Simsala Grimm creators André Sikojev, Stefan Beiten and Claus Clausen wrote the first draft for the script, which had a darker tone in contrast to the series' light-hearted tone. The draft was rejected by Williams and co-producer Michael Hefferon, and Vanguard commissioned a new comedic draft, written by Moreland. Gerhard Hahn and Sahin Ersoz were initially considered to direct the film, but were replaced with Bolger, who was offered the position as director in January 2002.

=== Casting ===
Several actors signed on to provide voices for the film. The cast included Andy Dick as Yoyo, Wallace Shawn as Doc Croc, Freddie Prinze Jr. as Rick, Sarah Michelle Gellar as Ella, Patrick Warburton as the Prince, George Carlin as the Wizard, and Sigourney Weaver as Frieda. Gellar and Prinze Jr. recorded some of their scenes together. Robert Michael Jeter was initially set to voice Rumpelstiltskin, but died on March 30, 2003, so the role was re-cast with Michael McShane.

=== Divorce from Simsala Grimm and switch to Happily N'Ever After ===
In October 2002, Greenlight was affected by the early 2000s recession, causing financial issues and disruptions to their projects. They were looking for other companies (such as Millimages and Magma Films Ltd) to produce Simsala Grimm's second season at the time, so they decided to back out of producing the film, and sold the rights and interest of the film to Dresdner Bank, although they would still hold back-end participation. Berlin Animation Film handed its projects over to its new subsidiary, Berliner Film Companie, which employed 100 animators. Rainer Söhnlein was hired as Berliner Film Companie's CEO to supervise and finish the film. All connections to Simsala Grimm were removed, with the name of the film being changed to Happily N'Ever After, the story being rewritten, and Yoyo and Doc Croc being replaced with the new characters Mambo and Munk (whose designs were partially influenced by Timon and Pumbaa from The Lion King).

=== Animation ===
Even with the film having all references to Simsala Grimm removed, Hahn Film remained on board as the lead animation provider during this time. Concept art and designs, storyboards and animation tests for the new film were done by Ravinder Kundi, Jean-Paul Bondy, Miguel Alaminos Hódar, Nancy Beiman, Christian Kuntz and Tahsin Ozgur.

Due to the growing success of computer-animated films, which were seen as more profitable during the early 2000s, the 2D animated version of Happily N'Ever After would get scrapped by John H. Williams as a tax write-off. The project switched over to the new computer animation format; Hahn Film was fired from the project, and 100 animators were laid off, but Paul J. Bolger remained on board as the film's director. Some rough animation and the entire 2D storyboards had already been completed by that time.

IDT Entertainment's animation unit, Digital Production Solutions, was originally set to provide the computer animation production services for the film. When the work was given to them, the company refused it, deeming it unacceptable. A new CGI production studio was formed within Berliner Film Companie. Vanguard brought on J. Chad Hammes to co-produce the film for Berliner Film Companie after finishing his work on Valiant. The 3D film was animated using Autodesk Maya and rendered with Mental Ray at Mental Images. Bolger helped out with the animation process, providing footage of the actors' recording sessions to the crew to use as reference for animating the characters, and drawing the designs for the fairy tale book's illustrations, which were painted by one of his friends. Additional animation and visual effects were produced at The Lab Sydney, Method Studios, Mr. X, Elliott Animation, Nitrogen Studios, Quadriga FX and Bardel Entertainment.

=== Lionsgate distribution deal and post-production ===
It has been believed that the film was originally set to be distributed via Vanguard's distribution pact with The Walt Disney Company which had released the studio's 2005 debut film Valiant, but distribution rights were eventually secured with Lionsgate in early 2006, with help from the film's foreign sales distributor, Odyssey Entertainment. Happily N'Ever After was marked as the first theatrical animated film to ever be distributed by the studio since I Married a Strange Person!.

Feeling that the film wasn't where it needed to be in its current state, Yvette Kaplan and Doug Langdale were hired by the distributor to direct and write additional material. Langdale stayed in Los Angeles to write the new script, while Kaplan spent four months in Berlin working at Berliner Film Companie, where she, along with Ringo Hess, re-edited the film in full. Once the first redraft of the script had been completed, Kaplan directed the storyboards and animation for the new scenes. Børge Ring was hired as an additional storyboard artist.

Kaplan returned to Los Angeles, where she directed the scoring of the film, working with composer Paul Buckley on the new music score. The original music score, supervised by James L. Venable, and composed by Andy Carroll, Nick Amour, Phil Sawyer, Will Johnstone, Danail Getz, Tricia Holloway, Michael Patti, Robert Puff, David G. Russell and Jennifer Kes Remington, was largely scrapped. Kaplan voice directed some of the original actors for the new scenes, while Langdale handled the direction for the other actors. Kaplan oversaw the final audio mix at Skywalker Sound.

Production wrapped in April 2006. According to author Rolf Giesen, Happily N'Ever After was the most expensive animated film in Germany, and cost €44 million as a result of its delayed production.

== Release ==
The film had a premiere in Westwood, California on December 16, 2006, followed by its North American release by Lionsgate on January 5, 2007.

=== Home media ===
The film was released on DVD and Blu-ray by Lionsgate Home Entertainment on May 1, 2007. It made $16.7 million in DVD sales in the United States, and drew 17,000-20,000 viewers in Germany, with 200 copies released.

== Reception ==
=== Critical reception ===
As of 2022, the film has received a 6% on Rotten Tomatoes based on reviews from 81 critics. The site's critical consensus is: "Happily N'Ever After has none of the moxy, edge or postmodern wit of the other fairy-tales-gone-haywire CG movie it so blatantly rips off." On Metacritic, the film has a weighted average score of 28 out of 100, based on 22 critics, indicating "generally unfavorable" reviews. Audiences polled by CinemaScore gave the film an average grade of "C" on an A+ to F scale. It was the lowest-rated animated film on CinemaScore until Animal Farm in 2026.

Many critics have also unfavorably compared the film to the Shrek series. Matt Zoller Seitz of The New York Times wrote that "Anyone who dismisses the 'Shrek' movies as lowbrow junk should see Happily N'Ever After, a cartoon feature that apes those films' visuals, soundtrack choices and rude jokes, while throwing away their sweetness and conviction[...] the filmmakers are content to repeat fairy-tale tropes in a smug directorial voice." Writing for Empire, Simon Braund felt that "[The film] comes up severely wanting, a perfectly workable premise[...] hamstrung by lazy plotting and limp dialogue that ill-serves a solid voice cast. It looks good, but lacks the essential wit, sophistication and invention to make it fly."

Peter Debruge of Variety was more mixed on the feature, praising the film's voice acting and dialogue, but criticized "...its insincere love story" and "over-sexualized character design". Writing for Los Angeles Times, Alex Ching found that a few of the vocal performances were enjoyable, but criticized the romance between the two main characters and felt the celebrity voice cast was "[...] not nearly enough to shake the feeling that 'Happily N'Ever After' is the last hangover from the animation glut that was 2006."

=== Box office ===
The film was released in the first week of the year on January 5, 2007, and it opened #6 behind Dreamgirls, Freedom Writers, Children of Men, The Pursuit of Happyness, and Night at the Museum, which was at its third week at the #1 position. The film made $6,608,244 during its opening weekend. The film made a total of $15,589,393 at the North America box office. On a $47 million budget, the movie grossed $38.1 million worldwide, making it a box-office bomb.

=== Accolades ===
Ruth Lambert was nominated for Best Animated Voice-Over Feature Casting at the 23rd Artios Awards for her work on this movie.

== Sequel ==
A direct-to-video sequel, titled Happily N'Ever After 2: Snow White—Another Bite @ the Apple, was released on DVD on March 24, 2009 by Lionsgate Home Entertainment.
