= Charming (film) =

2019 animated musical comedy film

- Theatrical release poster
- Directed by: Ross Venokur
- Written by: Ross Venokur
- Produced by: John H. Williams
- Starring: Demi Lovato; Wilmer Valderrama; Sia; Ashley Tisdale; G.E.M.; Avril Lavigne; John Cleese
- Edited by: Rob Neal
- Music by: Tom Howe
- Production companies: 3QU Media; Vanguard Animation; WV Enterprises
- Distributed by: Netflix
- Release dates: April 20, 2018 (Spain); January 8, 2021 (United States)
- Running time: 85 minutes
- Countries: Canada; United States
- Language: English
- Box office: $8.5 million

Charming is a 2018 animated musical romantic fantasy comedy film written and directed by Ross Venokur. Produced by Vanguard Animation, 3QU Media, Cinesite and WV Enterprises, the film features the voices of Demi Lovato, Wilmer Valderrama, Sia, Ashley Tisdale, G.E.M. and Avril Lavigne. Lovato is responsible for the executive production of the soundtrack, with Sia, Fall Out Boy frontman Patrick Stump, and Steve Aoki contributing songs.

The film had its world premiere in Spain on 20 April 2018, and was met with generally negative reviews. Streaming service Netflix acquired the distribution rights to the film in the United States, and it was released on the platform on 8 January 2021.

== Plot ==
Prince Phillipe Charming was cursed by his father's former partner Nemeny Neverwish, who was jealous that Charming's father would not marry her. Charming instantly bewitches every woman in the land until his 21st birthday, when all the love will disappear. Charming can only break the spell if he finds his true love. Near his 21st birthday, Charming proposes to three bachelorettes: Cinderella, an impatient princess he met at a ball; Snow White, a distrustful princess he saved from a near death experience with an apple; and Sleeping Beauty, a narcoleptic princess he awoke from a hundred-year sleep with a kiss. None are aware that they are all engaged to the same man. Tired of his flippancy, Charming's father forces him to go on a quest known as the Gauntlet, which could help Charming discover his true love.

Having robbed a royal carriage full of treasure, crafty thief Lenore Quinonez briefly meets Charming, who instantly yet unknowingly falls for her when she refuses his advances. To avoid the royal guards, she hides in a bakery whilst Charming's fiancées walk in. Posing as a baker and stealing all their possessions, she discovers who their groom is and reveals they are all engaged to Charming, which causes a scandal. After being arrested, Lenore is bribed by the princesses' guardians to escort Charming to a place called Fire Mountain, where he will choose one of the three princesses to marry. She agrees in exchange for their riches. To avoid further legal trouble, and knowing Charming's reputation, she poses as a man named Lenny.

Lenore quickly becomes annoyed with Charming, who seems dim and lacking useful skills. The two bond after Lenore reveals her past: she was raised at sea and taught to distrust everyone. Unknown to Charming, Lenore is cursed by Nemeny to never be able to love. A tribe of giant women known as the Matilija attack them, but Charming charms their chief. She plans to marry him and postpones Lenore's death. While the tribe is busy with Charming, Lenore is taken in by the Half-Oracle, who informs her that Charming might be her true love. After obtaining the chief's "hairpin", an invincible sword, Charming frees Lenore. After escaping, Lenore and Charming enter a stone cave enchanted by Nemeny, where Lenore accidentally awakens a stone monster while stealing a ruby. Charming attempts to fight it but realizes returning the ruby will appease the creature. As he befriends the monster, Lenore ponders whether she and Charming belong together. Lenore develops feelings for Charming and sets up a date. Nemeny discovers this and, knowing Lenore is emotionally fragile, magically draws all the women in the area inexplicably towards Charming, ruining their date and leaving Lenore heartbroken.

The two make it to Fire Mountain, where they meet up with the princesses and their guardians. Charming is confused when Lenore receives her reward and by Lenny's cold demeanor. Lenore reveals the truth to Charming, and he realizes that Lenore is his true love, as they completed the Gauntlet trials together. Lenore feels that she betrayed him and ignores Charming's protestations that he loves her regardless. A heartbroken Charming declines to marry any of the princesses. Instead, he decides to execute himself to save the land from Nemeny's curse. Before his execution, Charming writes letters to all the enchanted women, explaining the curse. He and his father share a sad goodbye and, as he is about to be hanged, Charming speaks to his self-sacrifice. Lenore's bird friend Illy hears this, steals one of Charming's letters, and informs Lenore, who realizes that she is Charming's true love. She stops Charming from being hanged, and they admit their love. Before they kiss, Nemeny interrupts and brings the final chapter of her curse. She attempts to kill Lenore, but Charming takes the hit for her and dies, therefore finishing the final task of the Gauntlet: the "blind leap of faith". Grief-stricken, Lenore cries over his body but suddenly remembers "true love's kiss" and kisses Charming, bringing him back to life. Nemeny disappears forever, and the land is freed from her curses. Lenore and Philippe marry each other and live happily ever after.

== Cast ==
- Demi Lovato as Lenore Quinonez, a street-smart and cunning jewel thief who is cursed to never love. On her quest with Charming, she disguised and named herself Lenny. She is Charming's true love interest.
- Wilmer Valderrama as Prince Philippe Charming, a handsome prince cursed to make women fall for him, but has never felt the feeling himself. He is Lenore's love interest (despite his three fiancées).
- Sia as the Half-Oracle
- Avril Lavigne as Snow White, one of Prince Charming's three fiancées who is very distrustful and paranoid.
- Ashley Tisdale as Cinderella, one of Prince Charming's three fiancées who is rather impatient and airheaded.
- Keyshia Cole as Cinderella #2
- G.E.M as Sleeping Beauty, one of Prince Charming's three fiancées who is narcoleptic.
- Nia Vardalos as Nemeny Neverwish, a bitter and evil fairy bent on enacting revenge on Charming for being rejected by his father.
- Jim Cummings as King Charming / Goat maitre'd
- Chris Harrison as the Painter
- John Cleese as Fairy Godmother / The Executioner
- Tom Kenny as the Blessing Fairy
- Carlos Alazraqui as King Beauty / Cranky Dwarf / Frazelli The Baker
- Steve Aoki as Matilija DJ
- Ayesha Curry as Dainty Dish Chef
- Cory Edwards as Town Crier
- Aidan Wasserman as Young Boy
- Ava Wasserman as Young Girl
- Gwendoline Yeo as Maiden
- Dee Bradley Baker as Illy / Unconquerable Beast / Guards
- Tara Strong as Matilija Chief

Additional voices are Mylissa Acevedo, Stephen Apostolina, David Cowgill, Holly Dorff, Moosie Drier, Jackie Gonneau, Stephanie Lemelin, Eric Lopez, Dallas Lovato, Edie Mirman, Michelle Ruff, Marilyn Valderrama, Jessica Kardos, and Shelly Shenoy.

== Production ==
On September 18, 2014, it was announced that producers John H. Williams and Henry Skelsey's newly formed animated production company 3QU Media would be developing its first film, Charming, with Vanguard Animation, and in association with Cinesite. Ross Venokur directed the film based on his own script, and the film's budget would be under $20 million. The film has been in development at Vanguard Animation since 2011.

On February 19, 2015, Demi Lovato was cast as Lenore, the lead female role, and served as executive producer for the film's music soundtrack. On August 5, 2015, Avril Lavigne, Ashley Tisdale and G.E.M. joined the cast to voice Snow White, Cinderella and Sleeping Beauty, respectively. SC Films International will handle the international sales for the film. Wilmer Valderrama was cast as Prince Charming and served as the film's executive producer on September 16, 2015.

Production was done at the new animation studio Cinesite in August 2015 in Montreal. On June 28, 2017, it was reported that a newly launched distribution company, Smith Global Media, had acquired distribution rights to the film.

== Music ==
Lovato is responsible for the executive production of the soundtrack. Australian recording artist and songwriter Sia wrote two songs; "Magical" and "Balladino", performed by Lovato and herself, respectively. Also, Fall Out Boy frontman Patrick Stump penned a song named "Trophy Boy", which was sung by Lavigne, Tisdale and G.E.M., which Tisdale confirmed on her Snapchat to her fans. The soundtrack features music from Steve Aoki as well as music written and produced by Manny Guevara, David Kater and Mark Grilliot.

== Release ==
The film was postponed for an undisclosed time from 2017 to the spring of 2018, despite the filming, recording and production having been completed in December 2017. Although Vanguard Animation never officially announced a release date, it was released on April 20, 2018, in Spain and throughout the year in Europe and Africa.

It was released in the United Kingdom on August 2, 2019. Streaming service Netflix acquired the distribution rights to the film in the United States, and was released on the platform on January 8, 2021.

== Reception ==
On Rotten Tomatoes the film has an approval rating of 24% based on reviews from 17 critics.

Ian Freer of Empire magazine gave the film 2/5 and wrote: "It has the odd fun conceit but the set-up is tortured, the storytelling is episodic, the gags scattershot, the songs forgettable and the animation rudimentary. You'll live happily ever after without it."
