= Space Chimps 2: Zartog Strikes Back =

2010 American animated science fiction film

- Film poster
- Directed by: John H. Williams
- Written by: Rob Moreland
- Produced by: John H. Williams
- Starring: Tom Kenny; Zack Shada; Patrick Warburton; Cheryl Hines; Carlos Alazraqui; Laura Bailey; John DiMaggio; Stanley Tucci; Patrick Breen; Jane Lynch; Omid Abtahi
- Edited by: Eric Lake; Aaron Seelman
- Music by: Ned Douglas; Samuel Stewart
- Production companies: WonderWorld Studios; Vanguard Animation; Prana Studios
- Distributed by: 20th Century Fox Home Entertainment
- Release dates: May 28, 2010 (United Kingdom); October 5, 2010 (United States)
- Running time: 76 minutes
- Countries: United States; South Korea; India
- Language: English
- Box office: $4.3 million

Space Chimps 2: Zartog Strikes Back is a 2010 animated direct-to-video comic science fiction film directed and produced by John H. Williams and written by Rob Moreland. It is the sequel to Space Chimps (2008). Zack Shada, Carlos Alazraqui, Cheryl Hines, Patrick Warburton, Stanley Tucci, Patrick Breen, Omid Abtahi and Jane Lynch reprise their roles from the previous film; Andy Samberg, Jeff Daniels, and Kristin Chenoweth were replaced by Tom Kenny, John DiMaggio, and Laura Bailey, respectively.

Space Chimps 2: Zartog Strikes Back was released to cinemas in the United Kingdom on May 28, 2010 by Entertainment Film Distributors and was released on DVD in the United States on October 5, 2010 by 20th Century Fox Home Entertainment. The film was universally panned by critics, including a rare 0% rating on Rotten Tomatoes. Tucci, who voiced one of the supporting characters Senator, would later consider it the worst film he had ever done.

== Plot ==
Two years after the events of the first film, Comet, a tech-savvy young chimpanzee, wants to be taken seriously as a full-fledged space chimp, but Ham, Luna and the other chimpanzees do not take him seriously. Comet learns that he was removed from the last space mission because of budget cuts, and plans to go on the next space mission. Comet interferes with the controls on a rocket, accidentally launching the ship into space. Eventually, Comet lands on the planet Malgor, where he meets Ham's alien friend, Kilowatt, and gains respect from the residents there.

However, back on Earth, Zartog wants to get revenge on Ham for foiling his plans, and encounters an oblivious Titan, who gives him a tour of Kennedy Space Center. Zartog takes over Mission Control using a remote that vaporizes objects and zaps the Senator and the three scientists, Dr. Bob, Dr. Jagu and Dr. Poole out of existence. Comet, accompanied by Kilowatt, returns to Earth, while Ham evades Zartog by riding on a jetpack. While Zartog is distracted, Comet manages to steal the remote and reprograms it to bring the Senator and the scientists back, and shrink Zartog; Zartog escapes while the others laugh. The film ends with Zartog running from a dog he harassed earlier and a Guinea pig from the Mars mission, mentioned in the prior film.

== Cast ==
- Zack Shada as Comet
- Laura Bailey as Kilowatt, Computer Voice, Instar Receptionist, Girl Reporter
- Carlos Alazraqui as Houston, Piddles the Clown, Camera Guy
- Tom Kenny as Ham III, Reporter #1
- Cheryl Hines as Luna
- Patrick Warburton as Titan
- John DiMaggio as Zartog
- Stanley Tucci as Senator
- Patrick Breen as Dr. Bob
- Omid Abtahi as Dr. Jagu, Reporter #2
- Jane Lynch as Dr. Poole

== Release ==
Space Chimps 2: Zartog Strikes Back was released to cinemas in the United Kingdom on May 28, 2010 by Entertainment Film Distributors and was released on DVD in the United States on October 5, 2010 by 20th Century Fox Home Entertainment. The film grossed $4.3 million and originally opened on #7 in the United Kingdom on the release weekend.

== Reception ==
Space Chimps 2: Zartog Strikes Back has a rating of 0% on review aggregator Rotten Tomatoes (based on 8 reviews) and an average rating of 2.9/10.
