= Robyn S. Klein =

American neuroimmunologist

Robyn Klein
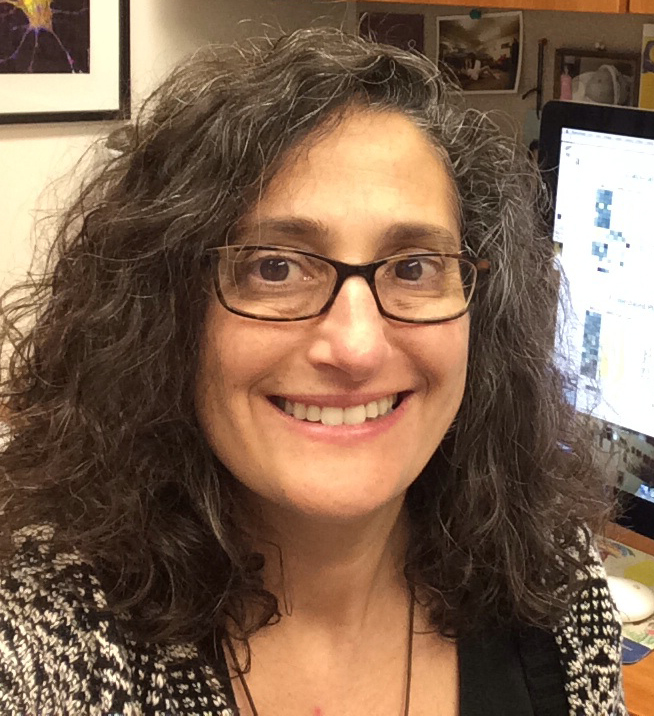
- Education: Barnard College; Albert Einstein College of Medicine; Brigham and Women's Hospital; Massachusetts General Hospital
- Known for: Virus mediated cognitive impairment, sex-differences in Multiple Sclerosis
- Awards: Dana Foundation Award for Neuroimmunology Distinguished Educator Award, Washington University
- Scientific career
- Fields: Neuroimmunology
- Workplaces: Washington University in St. Louis

Robyn S. Klein is an American neuroimmunologist as well as the Vice Provost and Associate Dean for Graduate Education at Washington University in St. Louis. Klein is also a professor in the Departments of Medicine, Anatomy & Neurobiology, and Pathology & Immunology. Her research explores the pathogenesis of neuroinflammation in the central nervous system by probing how immune signalling molecules regulate blood brain barrier permeability. Klein is also a fervent advocate for gender equity in STEM, publishing mechanisms to improve gender equity in speakers at conferences, participating nationally on gender equity discussion panels, and through service as the president of the Academic Women’s Network at the Washington University School of Medicine.

== Early life and education ==
Klein pursued her undergraduate studies at Columbia University’s Barnard College in New York City. In 1985, Klein completed her Bachelors of Arts in Biological Sciences, graduating with honors. After her undergraduate degree, Klein pursued an MD-PhD at Albert Einstein College of Medicine. On her way to obtaining her dual-degree, Klein completed a Masters in Neuroscience in 1990 at Albert Einstein College and then graduated in 1993 with a Ph.D. in Neuroscience and an M.D. from Albert Einstein. Klein then completed her internship and her residency in medicine at the Brigham and Women’s Hospital and subspecialty training in Infectious Diseases at Massachusetts General Hospital, both in Boston, Massachusetts. Throughout her experiences in the clinic, Klein became interested in the neuroprotective role of brain immune responses, as many Acquired Immunodeficiency Syndrome (AIDS) patients presented with severe brain infections in their immune compromised state. She wondered how the interplay of brain infection and immune responses impacted on overall brain function in acute and chronic states.

Following these clinical experiences and inspirations, Klein completed postdoctoral training in Immunology at Harvard Medical School. In 1999, Klein was the first to demonstrate that the HIV envelope protein could induce calcium transients in neurons and astrocytes via chemokine receptor activation. Her first author paper in the Journal of Immunology highlighting these findings provided a basis for understanding the neuronal damage and inflammation that result from HIV-1 encephalitis.

In 2002, Klein helped discover that deficiency in Chemokine Receptor 2 (CCR2) decreased monocyte recruitment to the CNS which help reduce the symptoms of experimental autoimmune encephalitis. In Klein’s first author paper in development in 2001, she reported that the chemokine CXC12 and its receptor CXCR4 are important in cerebellar granule cell proliferation and migration. Klein’s work has continually shown that immune signalling in the brain contributes to brain disease pathogenesis and cognitive defects that could be treated with immune targeting therapies.

== Career and research ==
After Klein completed her postdoctoral work, she was recruited to Washington University School of Medicine in St. Louis, Missouri in 2003. At WUSM, Klein was appointed, and still holds, professorships in the Departments of Medicine, Pathology & Immunology, and Neuroscience. After Klein arrived at WUSM, she founded the Center for Neuroimmunology and Neuroinfectious Diseases and now directs the center. In order to train the next leaders in neuroimmunology, Klein also developed a neuroimmunology basic and translational science research program where scientists work to probe the neuroimmune mechanisms underlying the pathogenesis of brain related diseases. In 2017, Klein was named the Vice Provost and Assistant Dean for Graduate Education for the Division of Biology and Biomedical Sciences. In addition to promoting departmental collaborations and ensuring that graduate students are supported in their pursuits of a variety of different career paths, Klein is focusing on improving diversity and equity in the program by recruiting students from underrepresented groups. These goals are in line with Klein's past achievements and involvements in advocating for diversity and equity in science. She is the co-director of the Amgen Scholars Program at Washington University ensuring that a diverse group of undergraduate students have the opportunity to experience science in top labs. Further, as the president of the Academic Women’s Network at the Washington University School of Medicine, Klein promotes career development and mentorship for women in science. Klein has conducted research on gender bias in conference organization, highlighting the fact that conference committee composition matters in the selection of diverse speakers. Klein reports that “naming the problem is the first step in solving it”, suggesting that conducting quantitative studies on gender bias in scientific meetings, hiring, acceptances, grant awards etc. will be the first step towards actually solving these issues and increasing representation in science.

Research in the Klein Lab is focused on exploring the cellular and molecular mechanisms that orchestrate inflammation and mediate its effect on the central nervous system. Her lab looks specifically at inflammation as a result of viral and autoimmune encephalitides via the interactions between endothelial, neural, and immune cell interactions. Her lab has focused on two main mechanisms with which the immune system signals to and interacts with the central nervous system: the first is through leukocytes infiltrating the brain and the second is through cytokines and chemokines directly affecting neuronal function. Her lab has extensively explored how cytokines and chemokines affect blood brain barrier permeability and her lab has discovered a novel role for cytokines and chemokines in the regulation of blood-brain barrier permeability to arboviruses, and protective versus pathogenic leukocytes. For example, since West Nile Virus has been shown to cause significant brain damage leading to memory loss, Klein’s lab researches ways to prevent this from occurring. She found that microglia, the brain’s innate immune cells, accumulate around neurons at the site of infection and complement protein is also highly expressed at the site of infection. Klein also found that these microglia remain active long after infection clears leading to post-infection inflammation and further synapse loss. These findings signify increased neuronal pruning and destruction by microglia leading to memory loss in patients with West Nile Virus infections.

Since inflammatory cues during infection regulate central nervous system repair via the regulation of neural stem cells, this is yet another mechanism that the Klein Lab probes to understand how viral infections and demyelinating diseases cause impaired learning and memory. Her lab specifically explores the cues that drive the localization, proliferation, and differentiation of neural stem cells to mediate their ability to successfully repair damaged neurons and myelin. Since demyelinating diseases are a focus of the lab, Klein made a discovery in 2014, that multiple sclerosis (MS) disproportionally effects women compared to men due to higher expression of a blood vessel receptor protein S1PR2. Further, this protein was expressed at even higher levels in MS patients in brain regions more affected by MS. Another goal of the Klein lab is to understand how glial cells regulate T cell activity in viral infections and autoimmune inflammation in the brain. Her research in these areas has highlighted the extensive communication between astrocytes and T cells such that astrocytes play a critical role in trafficking T cells throughout the CNS during disease. Overall Klein's work contributes to an increased understanding of normal central nervous system surveillance and its relationship to inflammatory patterns that are observed in disease states which ultimately helps to identify therapeutic targets for the wide array of brain diseases that lack cures and treatments.

== Memberships ==
- American College of Physicians
- American Society for Microbiology
- American Society for Immunology and the International Society for Neuroimmunology
- President of the Academic Women’s Network at the School of Medicine
- Elected Member of the International Advisory Board of the International Society of Neuroimmunology
- Founding member of the International Society for NeuroVirology

== Awards and honors ==
- 2023 Fellow of the American Association for the Advancement of Science
- 2020 Distinguished Educator Award of Graduate Education at Washington University
- 2017 Dana Foundation Award for Neuroimmunology

== Publications ==
- Encephalitic Alphaviruses Exploit Caveola-Mediated Transcytosis at the Blood-Brain Barrier for Central Nervous System Entry. Samili H, Cain MD, Jiang X, Roth RA, Beatty W, Sun C, Klimstra WB, Hou J, Klein RS. mBio. 2020 Feb 11;11(1).
- Astrocyte-T cell crosstalk regulates region-specific neuroinflammation. Williams JL*, Manivasagam S*, Smith BC, Sim J, Vollmer LL, Daniels BP, Russell JH, Klein RS. Glia. 2020 Jan 21.
- Mechanisms of Pathogen Invasion into the Central Nervous System. Cain MD, Salimi H, Diamond MS, Klein RS. Neuron. 2019 Sep 4;103(5):771-783.
- T cells promote microglia-mediated synaptic elimination and cognitive dysfunction during recovery from neuropathogenic flaviviruses. Garber C*, Soung A*, Vollmer LL, Kanmogne M, Last A, Brown J, Klein RS. Nature Neuroscience. 2019 Aug;22(8):1276-1288.
- Neuroinflammation During RNA Viral Infections. Klein RS, Garber C, Funk KE, Salimi H, Soung A, Kanmogne M, Manivasagam S, Agner S, Cain M. Annual Review of Immunology. 2019 Apr 26;37:73-95.
- CSF1R antagonism limits local restimulation of antiviral CD8+ T cells during viral encephalitis. Funk KE, Klein RS. Journal of Neuroinflammation. 2019 Jan 31;16(1):22.
- Astrocytes decrease adult neurogenesis during virus-induced memory dysfunction via IL-1. Garber C*, Vasek MJ*, Vollmer LL, Sun T, Jiang X, Klein RS. Nature Immunology. 2018 Feb;19(2):151-161.
- Virus entry and replication in the brain precedes blood-brain barrier disruption during intranasal alphavirus infection. Cain MD, Salimi H, Gong Y, Yang L, Hamilton SL, Heffernan JR, Hou J, Miller MJ, Klein RS. Journal of Neuroimmunology. 2017 Jul 15;308:118-130.
- Speaking out about gender imbalance in invited speakers improves diversity. Klein RS, Voskuhl R, Segal BM, Dittel BN, Lane TE, Bethea JR, Carson MJ, Colton C, Rosi S, Anderson A, Piccio L, Goverman JM, Benveniste EN, Brown MA, Tiwari-Woodruff SK, Harris TH, Cross AH. Nature Immunology. 2017 Apr 18;18(5):475-478.
- Infectious immunity in the central nervous system and brain function. Klein RS, Garber C, Howard N. Nature Immunology. 2017 Feb;18(2):132-141.
- A complement-microglial axis drives synapse loss during virus-induced memory impairment. Vasek MJ, Garber C, Dorsey D, Durrant DM, Bollman B, Soung A, Yu J, Perez-Torres C, Frouin A, Wilton DK, Funk K, DeMasters BK, Jiang X, Bowen JR, Mennerick S, Robinson JK, Garbow JR, Tyler KL, Suthar MS, Schmidt RE, Stevens B, Klein RS. Nature. 2016 Jun;534(7608):538-43.
- CCR5 limits cortical viral loads during West Nile virus infection of the central nervous system. Durrant DM, Daniels BP, Pasieka T, Dorsey D, Klein RS. Journal of Neuroinflammation. 2015 Dec 15;12:233.
- IL-1R1 signaling regulates CXCL12-mediated T cell localization and fate within the central nervous system during West Nile Virus encephalitis. Durrant DM, Daniels BP, Klein RS. Journal of Immunology. 2014 Oct 15;193(8):4095-106.
- IL-1R1 is required for dendritic cell-mediated T cell reactivation within the CNS during West Nile virus encephalitis. Durrant DM, Robinette ML, Klein RS. Journal of Experimental Medicine. 2013 Mar 11;210(3):503-16.
- Immortalized human cerebral microvascular endothelial cells maintain the properties of primary cells in an in vitro model of immune migration across the blood brain barrier. Daniels BP, Cruz-Orengo L, Pasieka TJ, Couraud PO, Romero IA, Weksler B, Cooper JA, Doering TL, Klein RS. Journal of Neuroscience Methods. 2013 Jan 15;212(1):173-9.
- CXCR7 antagonism prevents axonal injury during experimental autoimmune encephalomyelitis as revealed by in vivo axial diffusivity. Cruz-Orengo L, Chen YJ, Kim JH, Dorsey D, Song SK, Klein RS. Journal of Neuroinflammation. 2011 Dec 6;8:170.
- CXCR7 influences leukocyte entry into the CNS parenchyma by controlling abluminal CXCL12 abundance during autoimmunity. Cruz-Orengo L, Holman DW, Dorsey D, Zhou L, Zhang P, Wright M, McCandless EE, Patel JR, Luker GD, Littman DR, Russell JH, Klein RS. Journal of Experimental Medicine. 2011 Feb 14;208(2):327-39.
- TNF-alpha-dependent regulation of CXCR3 expression modulates neuronal survival during West Nile virus encephalitis. Zhang B, Patel J, Croyle M, Diamond MS, Klein RS. Journal of Neuroimmunology. 2010 Jul 27;224(1-2):28-38.
- CXCR4 antagonism increases T cell trafficking in the central nervous system and improves survival from West Nile virus encephalitis. McCandless EE, Zhang B, Diamond MS, Klein RS. PNAS. 2008 Aug 12;105(32):11270-5.
- Pathological expression of CXCL12 at the blood-brain barrier correlates with severity of multiple sclerosis. McCandless EE, Piccio L, Woerner BM, Schmidt RE, Rubin JB, Cross AH, Klein RS. The American Journal of Pathology. 2008 Mar;172(3):799-808.
- CXCR3 mediates region-specific antiviral T cell trafficking within the central nervous system during West Nile virus encephalitis. Zhang B, Chan YK, Lu B, Diamond MS, Klein RS. Journal of Immunology. 2008 Feb 15;180(4):2641-9.
- Molecular targets for disrupting leukocyte trafficking during multiple sclerosis. McCandless EE, Klein RS. Expert Reviews in Molecular Medicine. 2007 Jul 19;9(20):1-19.
- CXCL12 limits inflammation by localizing mononuclear infiltrates to the perivascular space during experimental autoimmune encephalomyelitis. McCandless EE, Wang Q, Woerner BM, Harper JM, Klein RS. Journal of Immunology. 2006 Dec 1;177(11):8053-64.
- Neuronal CXCL10 directs CD8+ T-cell recruitment and control of West Nile virus encephalitis. Klein RS, Lin E, Zhang B, Luster AD, Tollett J, Samuel MA, Engle M, Diamond MS. Journal of Virology. 2005 Sep;79(17):11457-66.
