= Vanguard Animation =

American animation studio by John H. Williams

Vanguard Films & Animation
- Type: Private
- Industry: Computer animation VFX; Motion-capture; Animated
- Founded: 2002; 24 years ago
- Founders: John H. Williams; Neil Braun
- Headquarters: West Hollywood, California, United States
- Number of locations: 3
- Key people: John H. Williams (CEO); Gary Chapman (Head of Prod.)
- Number of employees: 10
- Subsidiaries: Rabbit Ears Entertainment, L.L.C.
- Website: vanguardanimation.com

Vanguard Films & Animation, also known as Vanguard Animation, is an American independent animation production studio founded in 2002 by producer John H. Williams and Neil Braun. The studio has offices in Vancouver, British Columbia, Canada and Ealing Studios in London, England, United Kingdom. Starz Distribution (then IDT Entertainment) formerly owns a minority stake in the studio.

== History ==
The studio was founded in 2002 by John H. Williams. For its launch, it signed with Ealing Studios a four-picture deal to produce sub-$40 million computer-animated films. The following year in July 2003, Vanguard sold a minority stake to IDT Corporation and partnered with its animation unit, Digital Production Solutions, to co-produce and co-own all Vanguard's properties, including Valiant (2005) produced for Disney.

The company was part of the then-new "pipeline-free" trend (reported by Variety in 2006) in animation production, where the companies did not keep the talent on payroll and instead were "establishing a team from scratch to execute each new feature", allowing them to secure tax breaks from the governments. For example, the feature "Valiant" was produced in the UK in order to collect the tax incentives there. With UK incentives ending, the production (for "Space Chimps") moved to Canada (Vancouver).

== Filmography ==
=== Feature films ===
#	Title	Release date	Gross	Rotten Tomatoes	Metacritic
1	Valiant	August 19, 2005 (US)	$61,746,888	32%	45%
2	Happily N'Ever After	January 5, 2007 (US)	$38,085,778	6%	28%
3	Space Chimps	July 18, 2008	$64,834,964	33%	36%
4	Space Chimps 2: Zartog Strikes Back (DTV)	May 28, 2010	$4,124,518	0%	—N/a
5	Get Squirrely	November 4, 2016	$1,224,520	34%	—N/a
6	Gnome Alone	November 2, 2017	$10,800,715	44%	—N/a
7	Charming	April 20, 2018	$8,751,856	24%	—N/a
8	Trouble	August 8, 2019	$11,942,158	36%	—N/a
9	Fearless	August 14, 2020	—N/a	49%	—N/a
10	Rally Road Racers	May 12, 2023	$3,204,824	73%	—N/a

=== Upcoming films ===
#	Title	Release date
11	Gnome Alone 2: Game of Gnomes	TBD
12	Goose Chase	TBD

=== Short films ===
- Frank Was a Monster Who Wanted to Dance

=== Unproduced projects ===
- Citizen Siege - A science fiction thriller animated film that was to be co-produced by Vanguard and video game developer Oddworld Inhabitants. The plot involves an expatriate who returns home to find that he has been repossessed, in a shady underhive-like world where a corporate government rules the continent. The film was originally scheduled to release in 2009, but the date was pushed back to an unknown date. As of 2019, there have been no recent developments regarding the film's production.
- Alien Rock Band
- Rotten Island
- Buzby
- City of Dragons
- Atomic Circus
- Oz Wars
- Ribbit
- The Twits
- Galaxy High
- The Gnome King

== See also ==
- List of computer-animated films
