= John H. Williams (film producer) =

American film producer

- Born: John Hayward Williams; June 17, 1953 (age 72); New York City, New York, US
- Other names: John Williams
- Occupations: Film producer; director; studio executive
- Years active: 1984–present
- Employer: Vanguard Animation
- Spouse: Lacey Ford (m. 1983)

John Hayward Williams (born June 17, 1953) is an American film producer known for his work both in live-action and in animation. He is mainly known for the mainline Shrek film franchise. He is the founder and owner of his own company, Vanguard Films which produces live-action and animated (through its sister skein Vanguard Animation) products.

== Life and career ==
Williams was born in Manhattan, New York City, on June 17, 1953.

In 2001 shortly after working on Shrek, Williams founded Vanguard Animation and started working on projects such as Valiant (2005), Happily N'Ever After (2007), Space Chimps (2008) and its sequel Space Chimps 2: Zartog Strikes Back.

He made his directorial debut on Space Chimps 2: Zartog Strikes Back.

=== Vanguard Comics ===
On June 6, 2008, John Williams along with Platinum Studios created a new comics publishing imprint called Vanguard Comics.

=== 3QU Media ===
In 2014, partnering with Henry Skelsey, formed 3QU Media as a specialist in CG-animated feature films for the international marketplace. 3QU Media is producing in association with WV Enterprises. Williams is producing and SC Films International is handling foreign sales.

== Filmography ==
Film
Year	Film	Role	Notes
1988	Apprentice to Murder	Co-producer	
1991	The Grapes of Wrath	Producer	TV movie
1994	The Dining Room	Producer	TV movie
1997	Seven Years in Tibet	Producer	
1998	Spalding Gray: Terrors of Pleasure	Producer	
1999	Balloon Farm	Producer	TV movie
2001	Shrek	Producer	
2002	The Tuxedo	Producer	
2002	The Junction Boys	Producer	TV movie
2004	Shrek 2	Producer	
2005	Valiant	Producer	
2007	Happily N'Ever After	Producer	
2007	Shrek the Third	Executive producer	
2008	Space Chimps	Producer	
2010	Shrek Forever After	Executive producer	
2010	Space Chimps 2: Zartog Strikes Back	Director & producer	
2011	Puss in Boots	Co-producer	
2012	On the Road	Executive producer	
2015	Get Squirrely	Executive Producer	
2017	Gnome Alone	Producer	
2018	Charming	Producer	
2019	Trouble	Producer	
2020	Fearless	Producer	
2023	Rally Road Racers	Producer	
TBA	Goose Chase	Producer	Pre-production

Television
Date	Show	Role	Notes
1984-1991	American Playhouse	Producer	TV series - 4 episodes
1985	Great Performances	Producer	TV series - 1 episode
1987-1988	American Masters	Executive producer	TV series - 2 episodes
