= 2021 in animation =

2021 in animation is an overview of notable events, including notable awards, list of films released, television show debuts and endings, and notable deaths.

== Events ==
=== January ===
- January 3: The Great North's first episode "Sexi Moose Adventure" premieres on Fox.
- January 7: Season 2 of Paru Itagaki's Beastars airs its first episode on Japanese television.
- January 8: The second and final season of The Idhun Chronicles premiered on Netflix.
- January 13: Big City Greens gets renewed for a third season as part of The Houghton Brothers' new overall deal with Disney Television Animation.
- January 15:
  - HBO Max added its "Animation" landing page.
  - The first ten episodes of season 2 of Disenchantment are released on Netflix.
- January 25: Disney+ removes Dumbo, Peter Pan, and The Aristocats, from their kids profiles due to certain scenes containing old-fashioned racial stereotypes. They remain available to adult viewers.
- January 26: Go, Dog. Go!, a series based on the children's books of the same name, premieres on Netflix.
- January 31: The third episode of Vivienne Medrano's independent webseries Helluva Boss, titled "Spring Broken", was released on YouTube.

=== February ===
- February 2: Kid Cosmic premiered on Netflix.
- February 5: The first episode of The Snoopy Show is aired on Apple TV+.
- February 9: Disney shuts down Blue Sky Studios due to current "economic realities" related to the COVID-19 pandemic.
- February 15: Pop singer Gala releases a music video, Parallel Lines, with animation by Nina Paley.
- February 17: Cartoon Network announced a film for The Amazing World of Gumball.
- February 22: Voice actor Harry Shearer announces he will no longer voice the African-American character Dr. Hibbert on The Simpsons, being replaced by Kevin Michael Richardson starting with the episode "Wad Goals".
- February 23:
  - Monster High was announced to come back with a live-action film and animated series on Nickelodeon.
  - The Scooby-Doo direct-to-video film Scooby-Doo! The Sword and the Scoob releases on DVD and Digital services. The movie is based on the 1938 British novel The Sword in the Stone.
- February 26: Tom and Jerry was released simultaneously in theaters and on HBO Max. It flopped at the box office.

=== March ===
- March 1: Qubo was discontinued, along with Ion Plus and Ion Shop.
- March 4:
  - Anime series Pacific Rim: The Black, based on the Pacific Rim film franchise, was released on Netflix.
  - The SpongeBob Movie: Sponge on the Run and Kamp Koral: SpongeBob's Under Years were released with the launch of Paramount+.
- March 5: Raya and the Last Dragon was released simultaneously in theaters and on Disney+.
- March 6:
  - New York Times Columnist, Charles M. Blow, claims that the Looney Tunes character Pepé Le Pew, "normalized rape culture". Following the publication of the article, it was reported that he was cut out of Space Jam: A New Legacy after Malcolm D. Lee took over directing. The character was reported to not be slated in current and future Warner Bros. projects. However, he appeared in the Animaniacs reboot episode, "Yakko Amakko" which premiered on November 5, 2021.
  - Amphibia resumes its second season.
- March 10: South Park concludes its 24th season on Comedy Central with its second hour-long COVID-19-related special "South ParQ Vaccination Special".
- March 14: The fourth episode of Helluva Boss, titled "C.H.E.R.U.B", was released on YouTube.
- March 15:
  - The DuckTales series finale, a three-part episode titled "The Last Adventure!", premieres.
  - Final Episode is Kain Merah Ipin of Upin & Ipin (Musim 14) premiered on MNCTV
- March 17: Anime-inspired music video for "Musician" by Porter Robinson, was released on YouTube.
- March 21:
  - The 700th episode of The Simpsons, "Manger Things", premiered. The couch gag is animated by Bill Plympton.
  - Lebanese animated feature Alephia 2053 released on YouTube and streaming platforms.
- March 25: Season 2 of Paru Itagaki's Beastars airs its finale episode on Japanese television.
- March 26:
  - The SpongeBob SquarePants episode "Mid-Life Crustacean" was removed and made unavailable to stream on Paramount+ due to the panty raid scene, while "Kwarantined Krab" is delayed due to its similarities to the current COVID-19 pandemic, with the latter episode's eventual premiere on Nickelodeon on April 29, 2022.
  - The pilot for the SMG4 spin-off Sunset Paradise premiered on YouTube on the GLITCH channel.
- March 29:
  - The first episode of an animated series based on Pieter De Poortere's gag comic Boerke (in English: Dickie) airs on television.
  - 101 Dalmatian Street makes its US cable television premiere.

=== April ===
- April 2: Season 8 of Paw Patrol begins on Nickelodeon in the US with the premiere of the episodes "Pups Save a Sweet Mayor/Pups Save a Magic Trick".
- April 3: The Paw Patrol episodes "Pups Save Thundermouth/Pups Save a Class Pet" release on Netflix in Canada, thus concluding the seventh season of the show. The episodes aired on TVO 7 days later.
- April 7: Cartoon Network Studios Europe is rebranded as Hanna-Barbera Studios Europe.
- April 10: Blue Sky Studios closes down.
- April 12: The season 2 finale of Bluey titled, "Easter", premieres to universal acclaim.
- April 16:
  - 48th Annie Awards.
  - Netflix Animation releases Arlo the Alligator Boy.
- April 19: Season 18 of American Dad! begins on TBS with the premiere of the episode "Who Smarted?". The season's premiere was watched by only 560 thousand viewers that night, marking a new low in the show's viewership.
- April 23: Mike Rianda's debut film The Mitchells vs. the Machines, produced by Sony Pictures Animation, premieres in select theaters in the United States. The film is later released on Netflix on April 30.
- April 25: 93rd Academy Awards:
  - Soul, directed by Pete Docter and Dana Murray, produced by Pixar, wins the Academy Award for Best Animated Feature. Its soundtrack, composed by Trent Reznor, Atticus Ross and Jon Batiste, wins the Academy Award for Best Original Score.
  - If Anything Happens I Love You, directed by Michael Govier and Will McCormack, won the Academy Award for Best Animated Short Film.
- April 30: The fifth episode of Helluva Boss, titled "The Harvest Moon Festival", was released on YouTube. Actor Norman Reedus guest stars.

=== May ===
- May 7: Paw Patrol concludes its seventh season on Nickelodeon in the US with the episodes "Pups Save Thundermouth/Pups Save a Class Pet".
- May 15: Season 8 of Paw Patrol begins on TVO in Canada with the premiere of the episodes "Pups Save a Runaway Rooster/Pups Save a Snowbound Cow".
- May 16:
  - The Great North concludes its first season on Fox with the episode "My Fart Will Go on Adventure". The season's finale was watched by only 812 thousand viewers that night.
  - Family Guy concludes its 19th season on Fox with the episode "Tales of Former Sports Glory". The season's finale was seen by over 1.1 million viewers that night.
- May 17: Deadline Hollywood reported that The Owl House was renewed for a third season comprising three 44-minute specials, ahead of the premiere of the second season the following month.
- May 22: The second-season finale of Amphibia, "True Colors", finally premiered on Disney Channel three weeks after being delayed and subsequently leaked by iTunes.
- May 23:
  - The Simpsons concludes its 32nd season on Fox with the episode "The Last Barfighter", guest starring English actor Ian McShane. The season's finale was seen by over 1 million viewers that night.
  - Season 2 of Duncanville begins on Fox with the premiere of the following episodes:
    - "Das Banana Boot" (viewership: 0.80 million)
    - "Duncan's New Word" (viewership: 0.71 million)
  - Bob's Burgers concludes its 11th season on Fox with the episode "Vampire Disco Death Dance". The season's finale was watched by only 980 thousand viewers that night, marking a new low in the show's viewership.
- May 27: The first episode of the rebooted series Rugrats is broadcast on Paramount+.
- May 31: The first episode of HouseBroken is broadcast.

=== June ===
- June: During the annual Annecy International Animation Film Festival, Austria's first animated feature film, Rotzbub, directed by Marcus H. Rosenmüller & Santiago López Jover, is released. The plot and design are based on cartoonist Manfred Deix's life and cartoons.
- June 4: Season 2 of Amphibia released on Disney+, just a month after the season concluded.
- June 7: The Molly of Denali season one finale, a one-hour special titled "Molly and the Great One", premiered on PBS Kids.
- June 11:
  - A Rock Dog direct-to-video sequel, Rock Dog 2: Rock Around the Park, was released.
  - Sony Pictures Animation releases Wish Dragon on Netflix, written and directed by Chris Appelhans.
  - Rainbow High premieres its season 1 finale on YouTube.
- June 12: The second season of The Owl House premiered on Disney Channel.
- June 17: An upcoming Disney Channel series titled Kiff was revealed to be greenlit for the network at this year's Annecy Film Festival.
- June 18: Luca premiered on Disney+ instead of being released theatrically in the United States.
- June 20: Bless the Harts' final episode, "Betty's Birthday", premieres on Fox. The show's finale was only watched by 370 thousand viewers that night.
- June 24: Anime series Godzilla Singular Point premiered on Netflix, as part of the MonsterVerse.

=== July ===
- July 2:
  - The Boss Baby: Family Business was released simultaneously in theaters and on Peacock.
  - Craig of the Creek concludes its third season on Cartoon Network with the final part of the "Capture the Flag" special event. The season's finale was seen by a total of 482 thousand viewers that morning.
- July 7: The first episode of Monsters at Work airs on Disney+.
- July 9: The first episodes of the SpongeBob SquarePants spin-off series The Patrick Star Show and Middlemost Post premiered on Nickelodeon.
- July 15: Season 2 of Paru Itagaki's Beastars was released on Netflix in both Japanese and English.
- July 16:
  - A revival of Johnny Test premiered on Netflix.
  - Space Jam: A New Legacy was released simultaneously in theaters and on HBO Max.
  - Rainbow High premieres the first episode of its second season.
- July 21: The first five episodes from Season 2 of The Owl House were released on Disney+.
- July 22: Kyōhei Ishiguro's Words Bubble Up Like Soda Pop was simultaneously released in Japanese theaters and on Netflix worldwide.
- July 23: Paw Patrol concludes its sixth season on Nickelodeon in the US with the episodes "Ultimate Rescue: Pups Save the Opening Ceremonies/Ultimate Rescue: Pups Save the Adventure Bay Games".
- July 30:
  - Kirk DeMicco's Vivo, produced by Sony Pictures Animation, premieres in select theaters in the United States. It marks Sony Pictures Animation's first musical film. The film is later released on Netflix on August 6.
  - The final episode of Sunset Paradise, "Rebirth" premiered on YouTube on the GLITCH channel, Meggy returned to SMG4 the next day.
- July 31: The Owl House episode titled, "Knock, Knock, Knockin' on Hooty's Door" premieres on Disney Channel to critical acclaim. In it, the characters Luz and Amity begin officially dating, making them one of the few explicitly queer couples in a Disney animated series.

=== August ===
- August 1: The third series of Bluey premieres to critical acclaim.
- August 2: The Teen Titans Go! episode "Cy & Beasty" premieres on Cartoon Network, the episode features Cyborg & Beast Boy spoofing Tom and Jerry (with Cyborg as the titular feline and Beast Boy as the titular rodent) to prove which character is superior.
- August 6: Music video for "Fight Dirty", by Salvatore Ganacci, was released on YouTube.
- August 11: What If...?, an animated anthology series produced by Marvel Studios, premiered on Disney+.
- August 13: Music video for "Cold Heart", by Elton John and Dua Lipa, was released on YouTube.
- August 18: Episodes 6-10 from Season 2 of The Owl House were released on Disney+.
- August 20:
  - PAW Patrol: The Movie was released simultaneously in theaters and on Paramount+.
  - The Loud House Movie, a feature film based on The Loud House, is released on Netflix.
- August 21: The sixth episode of Helluva Boss, titled "Truth Seekers", was released on YouTube.
- August 27: I Heart Arlo, a series follow-up of the film Arlo the Alligator Boy, is released on Netflix.
- August 30: Duncanville concludes its second season on Fox with the episode "Witch Day 2". The season's finale was watched by only 701 thousand viewers that night.

=== September ===
- September 13:
  - Animated music video for "Levitating", by Dua Lipa, was released on YouTube.
  - The preschool block Cartoonito was released on Cartoon Network and HBO Max.
- September 14: The Scooby-Doo direct-to-video film Straight Outta Nowhere: Scooby-Doo! Meets Courage the Cowardly Dog releases on DVD and Digital services. The movie is a crossover with the classic Cartoon Network series Courage the Cowardly Dog. This film also marks the final acting role for Thea White as she died two months prior to the film's release.
- September 18:
  - After 18 years, Family Guy officially leaves Adult Swim.
  - Strawberry Shortcake: Berry in the Big City, the new installment and also reboot of the franchise of the same name was released on YouTube.
- September 21: The Amazing World of Gumball gets a new series and greenlit film, with Ben Bocquelet returning to the franchise.
- September 22: Star Wars: Visions premiered on Disney+.
- September 24: My Little Pony: A New Generation was released on Netflix, marking the beginning of the toy franchise's "fifth generation".
- September 26:
  - Fox Television Animation was renamed as 20th Television Animation.
  - Season 33 of The Simpsons begins on Fox with the premiere of the episode "The Star of the Backstage", guest starring famed actresses Kristen Bell (as Marge's singing voice) & Sara Chase. The season's premiere was seen by over 3.4 million viewers that night.
  - Season 2 of The Great North begins on Fox with the premiere of the episode "Brace/Off Adventure". The season's premiere was seen by over 1.8 million viewers that night.
  - Season 12 of Bob's Burgers begins on Fox with the premiere of the episode "Manic Pixie Crap Show". The season's premiere was seen by exactly 1.6 million viewers that night.
  - Season 20 of Family Guy begins on Fox with the premiere of the episode "LASIK Instinct". The season's premiere was seen by over 1.5 million viewers that night.

=== October ===
- October 1: The Ghost and Molly McGee premieres on Disney Channel in the United States.
- October 2: The third and final season of Amphibia premieres on Disney Channel.
- October 4: Alma's Way premieres on PBS Kids.
- October 5: Nickelodeon All-Star Brawl releases worldwide for the PlayStation 4, Xbox One, Nintendo Switch, PlayStation 5, Xbox Series X/S, & Microsoft Windows (PC).
- October 6: The first five episodes of The Ghost and Molly McGee were released on Disney+ (episodes 3-5 were released before their premiere airings on Disney Channel).
- October 9: Season 3 of Big City Greens premieres on Disney Channel with the Halloween special "Squashed!".
- October 10: Animaniacs reveals a sneak peek of the show's upcoming second season at New York Comic Con during a virtual event and is later released on YouTube by Hulu.
- October 16: Michael Caine, British actor (voice of Lord Redbrick in Gnomeo & Juliet and Sherlock Gnomes, and Finn McMissile in Cars 2) announced that, contrary to reports of the previous day, he was not retiring from acting.
- October 22:
  - Ron's Gone Wrong, produced by Locksmith Animation is released in theaters.
  - Maya and the Three premiered on Netflix.
- October 25:
  - American Dad! concludes its 18th season on TBS with the Halloween special "Steve's Franken Out". The season's premiere was watched by only 365 thousand viewers that night, marking a new low in the show's viewership.
  - Season 4 of Craig of the Creek begins on Cartoon Network with the premiere of the episode "The Legend of the Library". The season's premiere was seen by 189 thousand viewers that night.
- October 28: Star Trek: Prodigy is released on Paramount+.
- October 29: The pilot/first episode of Murder Drones, was released on YouTube on the GLITCH channel. It was Glitch Productions' first series that was not created by the company's founders, Luke & Kevin Lerdwichagul.
- October 30: The pitch trailer for an animated series titled Pibby is released on YouTube. Creator Dodge Greenley said it may become a full series depending on the viewers' reactions, and the reception has been positive from fans and critics alike.
- October 31: Part 1 of a two-part season 1 finale of Helluva Boss, titled "Ozzie's", was released on YouTube. Part 2, titled "Queen Bee", was released in June 2023, almost twenty months after "Ozzie's".

=== November ===
- November 3: The first five episodes from Season 3 of Amphibia were released on Disney+.
- November 5:
  - Season 5 of Big Mouth premiered on Netflix.
  - The second season of Animaniacs premiered on Hulu.
- November 8: The final season of Squidbillies premiered.
- November 18: Animated series Dogs in Space premiered on Netflix.
- November 22: Reruns of King of the Hill returned on Adult Swim after losing the syndication rights in 2018.
- November 24: Walt Disney Animation Studios's 60th animated film Encanto was released to theaters.
- November 25:
  - South Park: Post COVID was released on Paramount+.
  - The fifth & final season of F Is for Family premiered on Netflix.
- November 27: The season 3 mid-finale of Amphibia, "Froggy Little Christmas", premieres, with Rebecca Sugar guest-starring.

=== December ===
- December 2: The miniseries Santa Inc. was released on HBO Max to critical disdain.
- December 3: The animated film version of Diary of a Wimpy Kid premiered on Disney+.
- December 4: The Bluey episode, "Pass The Parcel" airs to positive reviews, but sparked controversy due to the episode's message about competitive parenting.
- December 7: The second season of Go, Dog. Go! premieres on Netflix.
- December 10:
  - The SpongeBob SquarePants episode "SpongeBob's Road to Christmas" is broadcast on Nickelodeon.
  - The Peanuts special Snoopy Presents: For Auld Lang Syne is aired on Apple TV+.
- December 13: Squidbillies airs its final episode.
- December 14: Flowers and Trees and WALL-E are inducted in the National Film Registry.
- December 15:
  - Ron's Gone Wrong was released on both Digital, Disney+ and HBO Max.
  - Rumble was released on Paramount+.
- December 16: South Park: Post COVID: The Return of COVID was released on Paramount+.
- December 19: Jay Johnston was confirmed to no longer be voicing Jimmy Pesto in Bob's Burgers due to his participation in the 2021 United States Capitol attack.
- December 22: Episodes 6-9 from Season 3 of Amphibia were released on Disney+.
- December 23: After more than 14 years on the air, Comedy Central aired Futurama for the final time due to Adult Swim regaining the syndication rights from Comedy Central. However, the series was added back on May 2, 2022.
- December 24: Encanto was released on Disney+ 30 days after its theatrical release.
- December 27: Reruns of Futurama returned on Adult Swim since after losing the syndication rights to the series to Comedy Central in 2007.
- December 29: Episodes 6-10 from Season 1 of The Ghost and Molly McGee were released on Disney+.
- December 30: The movie special Hilda and the Mountain King based on Hilda premiered on Netflix to critical acclaim.

== Awards ==
- Academy Award for Best Animated Feature: Soul
- Academy Award for Best Animated Short Film: If Anything Happens I Love You
- American Cinema Editors Award for Best Edited Animated Feature Film: Soul
- Annecy International Animated Film Festival Cristal du long métrage: Calamity, a Childhood of Martha Jane Cannary
- Annie Award for Best Animated Feature: Soul
- Annie Award for Best Animated Feature – Independent: Wolfwalkers
- Astra Film Award for Best Animated Film: Wolfwalkers
- Austin Film Critics Association Award for Best Animated Film: Wolfwalkers
- BAFTA Award for Best Animated Film: Soul
- BAFTA Award for Best Short Animation: The Owl and the Pussycat
- Boston Society of Film Critics Award for Best Animated Film: The Wolf House
- Central Ohio Film Critics Association Awards for Best Animated Feature: Wolfwalkers
- César Award for Best Animated Film: Josep
- Chicago Film Critics Association Award for Best Animated Film: Wolfwalkers
- Critics' Choice Movie Award for Best Animated Feature: Soul
- Critics' Choice Television Award for Best Animated Series: BoJack Horseman
- Dallas–Fort Worth Film Critics Association Award for Best Animated Film: Soul
- European Film Award for Best Animated Feature Film: Flee
- Florida Film Critics Circle Award for Best Animated Film: Soul
- Golden Globe Award for Best Animated Feature Film: Soul
- Golden Reel Awards: Soul
- Goya Award for Best Animated Film: Turu, the Wacky Hen
- Japan Academy Film Prize for Animation of the Year: Demon Slayer: Kimetsu no Yaiba the Movie: Mugen Train
- Kids' Choice Award for Favorite Animated Movie: Soul
- Los Angeles Film Critics Association Award for Best Animated Film: Wolfwalkers
- Mainichi Film Award for Best Animation Film: Looking for Magical Doremi
- NAACP Image Award for Outstanding Animated Motion Picture: Soul
- National Board of Review Award for Best Animated Film: Soul
- New York Film Critics Circle Award for Best Animated Film: Wolfwalkers
- Online Film Critics Society Award for Best Animated Film: Soul
- Producers Guild of America Award for Best Animated Motion Picture: Soul
- San Diego Film Critics Society Award for Best Animated Film: Wolfwalkers
- San Francisco Film Critics Circle Award for Best Animated Feature: Soul
- Satellite Award for Best Animated or Mixed Media Feature: Wolfwalkers
- Saturn Award for Best Animated Film: Onward
- Seattle Film Critics Society Award for Best Animated Feature: Wolfwalkers
- St. Louis Gateway Film Critics Association Award for Best Animated Film: Soul
- Tokyo Anime Award: Violet Evergarden: The Movie
- Toronto Film Critics Association Award for Best Animated Film: Wolfwalkers
- Visual Effects Society Award for Outstanding Visual Effects in an Animated Feature: Soul
- Washington D.C. Area Film Critics Association Award for Best Animated Feature: Soul

== Television series debuts ==
Date	Title	Channel, Streaming	Year
January 1	Headspace Guide to Meditation	Netflix	2021
January 3	The Great North	Fox	2021–2025
January 4	Toon In With Me	MeTV	2021–present
January 5	Gabby's Dollhouse	Netflix	2021–present
January 10	Horimiya	Tokyo MX, MBS, BS11, GYT, GTV, Crunchyroll	2021–2023
January 10	SK8 the Infinity	ABC, TV Asahi, Crunchyroll	2021–present
January 11	Long Gone Gulch	YouTube	2021
January 11	Mushoku Tensei: Jobless Reincarnation	Tokyo MX, MBS, BS11, KBS Kyoto, Sun TV, Crunchyroll	2021–present
January 13	Wonder Egg Priority	Nippon TV, Crunchyroll	2021
January 18	Dino Ranch	Disney Junior	2021–2024
January 22	Pixar Popcorn	Disney+	2021
January 25	Deer Squad	Nickelodeon	2021–present
January 26	Go, Dog. Go!	Netflix	2021–2023
February 2	Kid Cosmic	Netflix	2021–2022
February 5	The Snoopy Show	Apple TV+	2021–present
February 6	Devil May Care	Syfy	2021
February 20	Tom and Jerry Special Shorts	HBO Max	2021
February 28	Kayko and Kokosh	Netflix	2021
March 4	Kamp Koral: SpongeBob's Under Years	Paramount+, Nickelodeon	2021–2025
March 4	Pacific Rim: The Black	Netflix	2021–2022
March 5	City of Ghosts	Netflix	2021
March 17	The Pole	Syfy	2021
March 17	The Summoner	Syfy	2021
March 25	Dota: Dragon's Blood	Netflix	2021–2022
March 26	Invincible	Amazon Prime Video	2021–present
March 26	Sunset Paradise	YouTube	2021
March 29	Elliott from Earth	Cartoon Network	2021
April 2	Bakugan: Geogan Rising	Cartoon Network, Teletoon	2021
April 3	Vivy: Fluorite Eye's Song	Tokyo MX, BS11, MBS, GYT, GTV, Crunchyroll	2021
April 4	Birdgirl	Adult Swim	2021–2022
April 6	Odd Taxi	TV Tokyo, AT-X, Crunchyroll	2021
April 10	86: Eighty Six	Tokyo MX, BS11, GYT, GTV, Crunchyroll	2021–2022
April 12	To Your Eternity	NHK Educational TV, Crunchyroll	2021–2026
April 23	Stan Lee's Superhero Kindergarten	Amazon Prime Video, Kartoon Channel	2021
April 28	Headspace Guide to Sleep	Netflix	2021
May 4	Star Wars: The Bad Batch	Disney+	2021–2024
May 14	The Chicken Squad	Disney Junior	2021–2022
May 21	M.O.D.O.K.	Hulu	2021
May 27	Rugrats	Paramount+, Nickelodeon	2021–2026
May 31	HouseBroken	Fox	2021–2023
June 7	The BeatBuds, Let's Jam!	Nickelodeon	2021–present
June 24	Godzilla Singular Point	Netflix	2021
July 1	Tom and Jerry in New York	HBO Max	2021
July 4	We The People	Netflix	2021
July 7	Monsters at Work	Disney+	2021–2024
July 9	Middlemost Post	Nickelodeon	2021–2022
July 9	The Patrick Star Show	Nickelodeon	2021–present
July 13	Ridley Jones	Netflix	2021–2023
July 16	Johnny Test (2021)	Netflix	2021–2022
July 16	Sonny Boy	Tokyo MX, KBS Kyoto, Sun TV, BS Asahi, RAB, Crunchyroll	2021
July 22	Ultra City Smiths	AMC	2021
July 23	Masters of the Universe: Revelation	Netflix	2021–2024
July 28	Chip 'n' Dale: Park Life	Disney+	2021–2024
July 29	Jellystone!	HBO Max	2021–2025
July 29	The Prince	HBO Max	2021
July 30	Centaurworld	Netflix	2021
August 6	Marvel's Spidey and His Amazing Friends	Disney Junior	2021–present
August 11	What If...?	Disney+	2021–2024
August 20	Mickey Mouse Funhouse	Disney Junior	2021–2025
August 24	Oggy Oggy	Netflix	2021–2023
August 27	I Heart Arlo	Netflix	2021
September 1	Dug Days	Disney+	2021
September 2	Q-Force	Netflix	2021
September 3	Sharkdog	Netflix	2021–2023
September 5	Teenage Euthanasia	Adult Swim	2021–2023
September 7	Octonauts: Above and Beyond	Netflix	2021–present
September 10	The Smurfs	Nickelodeon	2021–present
September 10	Pokémon Master Journeys: The Series	Netflix	2021–2022
September 13	Little Ellen	HBO Max	2021–2022
September 13	Mush-Mush and the Mushables	Cartoonito	2021–2022
September 13	Thomas & Friends: All Engines Go!	Cartoonito, Netflix	2021–2025
September 16	The Harper House	Paramount+	2021
September 16	He-Man and the Masters of the Universe	Netflix	2021–2022
September 17	Do, Re & Mi	Amazon Prime Video	2021–2022
September 17	Chicago Party Aunt	Netflix	2021–2022
September 18	Lucas the Spider	Cartoonito	2021–2023
September 18	Strawberry Shortcake: Berry in the Big City	YouTube, Family Jr.	2021–2024
September 23	The Croods: Family Tree	Hulu, Peacock	2021–2023
September 24	Wolfboy and the Everything Factory	Apple TV+	2021–2022
September 28	Ada Twist, Scientist	Netflix	2021–2023
September 30	Ten-Year-Old Tom	HBO Max	2021–2023
September 30	Yabba-Dabba Dinosaurs	HBO Max	2021–2022
October 1	The Ghost and Molly McGee	Disney Channel	2021–2024
October 4	Alma's Way	PBS Kids	2021–present
October 4	Ghostforce	Disney XD	2021–present
October 8	A Tale Dark & Grimm	Netflix	2021
October 8	Get Rolling with Otis	Apple TV+	2021–present
October 14	Aquaman: King of Atlantis	HBO Max	2021
October 15	Karma's World	Netflix	2021–2022
October 15	Ranking of Kings	Fuji TV, Crunchyroll	2021–2023
October 22	Adventure Beast	Netflix	2021
October 22	Inside Job	Netflix	2021–2022
October 22	Maya and the Three	Netflix	2021
October 28	Star Trek: Prodigy	Paramount+, Nickelodeon	2021–2024
October 29	Fairfax	Amazon Prime Video	2021–2022
October 29	Murder Drones	YouTube	2021–2024
November 6	Arcane	Netflix	2021–2024
November 14	The Freak Brothers	Tubi	2021
November 17	Hit-Monkey	Hulu	2021–2024
November 17	Tear Along the Dotted Line	Netflix	2021
November 18	Dogs in Space	Netflix	2021–2022
November 19	Harriet the Spy	Apple TV+	2021–2023
December 2	Odo	HBO Max	2021–2022
December 2	Santa Inc.	HBO Max	2021
December 10	Saturday Morning All Star Hits!	Netflix	2021
December 23	Babble Bop!	Peacock	2021–present
December 23	DreamWorks Dragons: The Nine Realms	Hulu, Peacock	2021–2023

== Television series endings ==
Date	Title	Channel, Streaming	Year	Notes
January 11	Lazor Wulf	Adult Swim	2019–2021	Cancelled
January 15	Carmen Sandiego	Netflix	2019–2021	Ended
January 19	Hello Ninja	Netflix	2019–2021	Ended
January 20	Thomas & Friends	PBS Kids, Nick Jr.	1984–2021	Ended
January 22	Pixar Popcorn	Disney+	2021	Ended
February 4	Esme & Roy	HBO, HBO Max	2018–2021	Ended
February 12	Clifford the Big Red Dog	PBS Kids, Amazon Prime Video	2019–2021	Ended
February 15	Big Hero 6: The Series	Disney Channel, Disney XD	2017–2021	Ended
February 15	The Tom and Jerry Show	Cartoon Network, Boomerang	2014–2021	Ended
March 2	Word Party	Netflix	2016–2021	Ended
March 5	City of Ghosts	Netflix	2021	Ended
March 5	Pokémon Journeys: The Series	Netflix	2020–2021	Ended
March 15	DuckTales (2017)	Disney Channel, Disney XD	2017–2021	Ended
April 9	Elliott from Earth	Cartoon Network	2021	Ended
April 11	Ben 10 (2016)	Cartoon Network	2017–2021	Ended
April 15	Infinity Train	Cartoon Network, HBO Max	2019–2021	Ended
May 4	Trash Truck	Netflix	2020–2021	Ended
May 13	Castlevania	Netflix	2017–2021	Ended
May 21	M.O.D.O.K.	Hulu	2021	Ended
May 22	My Little Pony: Pony Life	Discovery Family	2020–2021	Ended
June 14	Final Space	TBS, Adult Swim	2018–2021	Ended
June 15	Rhyme Time Town	Netflix	2020–2021	Ended
June 20	Bless the Harts	Fox	2019–2021	Cancelled
June 26	Vivy: Fluorite Eye's Song	Crunchyroll	2021	Ended
June 28	Vampirina	Disney Junior	2017–2021	Ended
June 29	Odd Taxi	Crunchyroll	2021	Ended
June 30	Wonder Egg Priority	Crunchyroll	2021	Ended
July 4	We The People	Netflix	2021	Ended
July 29	The Prince	HBO Max	2021	Cancelled
July 30	Sunset Paradise	YouTube	2021	Ended
August 27	I Heart Arlo	Netflix	2021	Ended
September 2	Adventure Time: Distant Lands	HBO Max	2020–2021	Ended
September 2	Q-Force	Netflix	2021	Cancelled
October 1	Mickey Mouse Mixed-Up Adventures	Disney Junior	2017–2021	Ended
October 1	Sonny Boy	Crunchyroll	2021	Ended
October 22	Maya and the Three	Netflix	2021	Ended
October 24	DC Super Hero Girls	Cartoon Network	2019–2021	Ended
October 28	Aquaman: King of Atlantis	HBO Max	2021	Ended
November 4	The Harper House	Paramount+	2021	Ended
November 9	The Magic School Bus Rides Again	Netflix	2017–2021	Ended
November 18	Tom and Jerry in New York	HBO Max	2021	Ended
November 25	F Is for Family	Netflix	2015–2021	Ended
December 7	Apple & Onion	Cartoon Network	2018–2021	Ended
December 7	Centaurworld	Netflix	2021	Ended
December 10	Crossing Swords	Hulu	2020–2021	Ended
December 12	Squidbillies	Adult Swim	2005–2021	Ended
December 16	The Fungies!	HBO Max	2020–2021	Ended
December 17	Fast & Furious: Spy Racers	Netflix	2019–2021	Ended
December 24	Talking Tom & Friends	YouTube	2014–2021	Ended

== Television season premieres ==
Date	Title	Season	Channel, Streaming
January 8	Teen Titans Go!	7	Cartoon Network
April 2	Paw Patrol	8	Nickelodeon (Note: Season later premiered in Canada on TVO on May 15th.)
April 19	American Dad!	18	TBS
June 12	The Owl House	2	Disney Channel
June 20	Rick and Morty	5	Adult Swim (Cartoon Network)
September 4	Victor and Valentino	3	Cartoon Network
September 26	Bob's Burgers	12	Fox
September 26	Family Guy	20	Fox
September 26	The Great North	2	Fox
September 26	The Simpsons	33	Fox
October 2	Amphibia	3	Disney Channel
October 9	Big City Greens	3	Disney Channel
October 25	Craig of the Creek	4	Cartoon Network
November 5	Animaniacs (2020)	2	Hulu
November 5	Big Mouth	5	Netflix
November 25	F Is for Family	5	Netflix

== Television season finales ==
Date	Title	Season	Channel, Streaming
March 10	South Park	24	Comedy Central
April 3	Big City Greens	2	Disney Channel
April 3	Paw Patrol	7	Netflix (Canada) (Note: Season finale later aired on TVO on April 10th; Season later concluded in the US on Nickelodeon on May 7th.)
May 1	Teen Titans Go!	6	Cartoon Network
May 16	Family Guy	19	Fox
May 16	The Great North	1	Fox
May 22	Amphibia	2	Disney Channel
May 23	Bob's Burgers	11	Fox
May 23	Duncanville	2	Fox
May 23	The Simpsons	32	Fox
May 29	Victor and Valentino	2	Cartoon Network
July 2	Craig of the Creek	3	Cartoon Network
August 30	HouseBroken	1	Fox
September 5	Rick and Morty	5	Adult Swim (Cartoon Network)
October 21	Jellystone!	1	HBO Max
November 5	Animaniacs (2020)	2	Hulu
November 5	Big Mouth	5	Netflix

== Deaths ==
=== January ===
- January 2: Aylin Özmenek, Turkish animator, dies at age 78–79.
- January 3: Daniel de la Vega, American animator (Ruby-Spears Enterprises, Hanna-Barbera, Filmation, Tiny Toon Adventures, Shelley Duvall's Bedtime Stories), sheet timer (Tiny Toon Adventures, Disney Television Animation, The Pink Panther, Mad Jack the Pirate, Xyber 9: New Dawn, Nickelodeon Animation Studio, Tutenstein, The Secret Saturdays) and director (Wild West C.O.W.-Boys of Moo Mesa, Belle's Magical World, Danny Phantom, My Life as a Teenage Robot), dies at an unknown age.
- January 5: David Saire, English actor (additional voices in Courage the Cowardly Dog), dies at age 90.
- January 7:
  - Dave Creek, American animator (Happiness Is a Warm Blanket, Charlie Brown) and character designer (Bob's Burgers, Brickleberry, Central Park, The Great North), dies in a skydiving accident at age 43.
  - Marion Ramsey, American actress and singer (voice of D.I. Holler in The Addams Family, Laverne Hooks and Teacher in the Robot Chicken episode "Sausage Fest"), dies at age 73.
  - Val Bettin, American actor (voice of Dr. David Dawson in The Great Mouse Detective, the Sultan in the Aladdin franchise, Bishop in Shrek), dies at age 97.
- January 9: Antón Cancelas, Spanish voice actor (Spanish dub of Saint Seiya), dies at age 65.
- January 13: Siegfried Fischbacher, German-American magician, entertainer and producer (Father of the Pride), dies from pancreatic cancer at age 81.
- January 14: Peter Mark Richman, American actor (voice of The Phantom in Defenders of the Earth, Winchell in the Batman Beyond episode "Inqueling", Abin Sur in the Superman: The Animated Series episode "In Brightest Day...", Charles Baxter in the Batman: The Animated Series episode "Riddler's Reform"), dies at age 93.
- January 15: Dale Baer, American animator (Walt Disney Animation Studios, The Lord of the Rings, Peanuts specials, Rover Dangerfield, Tom and Jerry: The Movie, Quest for Camelot, Eric Goldberg couch gag in The Simpsons episode "Fland Canyon", Tom and Jerry: Willy Wonka and the Chocolate Factory) and storyboard artist (Hanna-Barbera, Mother Goose and Grimm, Animaniacs, The King and I), dies from complications from amyotrophic lateral sclerosis at age 70.
- January 16: Jim MacGeorge, American voice actor (voice of Captain Huffenpuff, Beany Boy and Crowy in Beany and Cecil, Oliver Hardy in Laurel & Hardy), dies at age 92.
- January 18: David Richardson, American television writer and producer (The Simpsons, F Is for Family), dies from heart failure at age 65.
- January 20: Mira Furlan, Croatian-born American actress and singer (voice of Silver Sable in Spider-Man, Babette in Arcane), dies from west nile virus at age 65.
- January 22:
  - Ron Campbell, Australian film director, producer (Ron Campbell Films, Inc.) and animator (Hanna-Barbera, Disney Television Animation, Nickelodeon Animation Studio, The Beatles, Yellow Submarine, Sesame Street, Duckman), dies at age 81.
  - Hank Aaron, American professional baseball player (voiced himself in the Futurama episode "A Leela of Her Own"), dies at age 86.
- January 23:
  - Hal Holbrook, American actor (voice of Amphitryon in Hercules, Cranston in Cats Don't Dance, Mayday in Planes: Fire & Rescue), dies at age 95.
  - Larry King, American actor and radio host (voice of Doris the Ugly Stepsister in Shrek, Wax Larry King in Gravity Falls, himself in The Simpsons episodes "One Fish, Two Fish, Blowfish, Blue Fish" and "Sideshow Bob Roberts" and the Arthur episode "Elwood City Turns 100!", and Bee Movie), dies at age 87.
- January 25: Ron Rodecker, American educator and artist (creator of Dragon Tales), dies from heart disease at age 90.
- January 27: Cloris Leachman, American actress and comedian (voice of Hydia in My Little Pony: The Movie, Gran in The Croods franchise, Granny Goodness in Justice League Action, Old Female Airplane Passenger in Beavis and Butt-Head Do America, Mrs. Tensedge in The Iron Giant, Anne Doofenshmirtz in Phineas and Ferb, Old Marceline in Adventure Time, Dola in Castle in the Sky, Mrs. Glick in The Simpsons episode "Three Men and a Comic Book"), dies at age 94.
- January 28: Cicely Tyson, American actress (voice of Mrs. Maureen Parker in The Proud Family episode "Behind Family Lines" and Great Aunt Shirley Hero in the Higglytown Heroes episode "Wayne's 100 Special Somethings"), dies at age 96.
- January 29: Walker Boone, Canadian actor (voice of Mario in The Adventures of Super Mario Bros. 3 and Super Mario World, Peppy Wolfman in Totally Spies! The Movie, Farmer in Daisy, A Hen into the Wild), dies at age 76.
- January 30:
  - Marc Wilmore, American television writer (The Simpsons, The PJs, F Is for Family), producer, actor and comedian (voice of Psychologist and the Narrator in The Simpsons episodes "It's a Mad, Mad, Mad, Mad Marge" and "The Wreck of the Relationship", Walter Burkett in The PJs, Teddy Morewill in F Is for Family, additional voices in Teacher's Pet), dies from COVID-19 at age 57.
  - Allan Burns, American television producer and writer (Jay Ward Productions), dies from Parkinson's disease and lewy body dementia at age 85.

=== February ===
- February 1:
  - Dustin Diamond, American actor and comedian (voice of Chubby Kid in Yogi's Great Escape, Screech Powers in Saved by the Bell, Gilbert Lowell and Employee in Robot Chicken, Xainius in Duck Dodgers), dies at age 44.
  - Mac Torres, American animator (Pac-Man, Who Framed Roger Rabbit, Jetsons: The Movie, Teenage Mutant Ninja Turtles, Dino Babies, Space Jam), dies from parkinson's disease at age 67.
  - Ángel Izquierdo, Spanish animator (Hanna-Barbera, The Charlie Brown and Snoopy Show, Asterix, Benjamin Blümchen, Pippi Longstocking), storyboard artist (Hurricanes) and director (Dragon Hill, la colina del dragón, The Magic Cube, RH+, the Vampire of Seville, Dragon Guardians, founder of Milimetros), dies at an unknown age.
- February 4: Polly Lou Livingston, American actress (voice of Tree Trunks in Adventure Time and Adventure Time: Distant Lands, Slippy Napkins in Bravest Warriors), dies at age 91.
- February 5: Christopher Plummer, Canadian actor (voice of Charles Muntz in Up, Henri le Pigeon in An American Tail, The Grand Duke of Owls in Rock-a-Doodle, narrator in Madeline), dies at age 91.
- February 7: Oscar González Loyo, Mexican animator and comics artist (Plaza Sésamo), dies at age 61.
- February 8: Shūichirō Moriyama, Japanese voice actor (Japanese dub voice of Flotsam and Jetsam in The Little Mermaid, Percival C. McLeach in The Rescuers Down Under, Buford in Rango), dies at age 86.
- February 9: Vinnie Bell, American animator (Terrytoons, Schoolhouse Rock!, The Berenstain Bears specials, Harvey Birdman, Attorney at Law), dies at age 89.
- February 17:
  - Rush Limbaugh, American conservative political commentator (voice of a Galactical Political Commentator and The Rancor in the Family Guy episodes "Blue Harvest" and "Its a Trap!", voiced himself in the Family Guy episode "Excellence in Broadcasting"), dies from lung cancer at age 70.
  - Mitch Rochon, American animator (Hanna-Barbera, Heavy Metal, Fire and Ice, The Chipmunk Adventure), director (My Little Pony Tales, Belle's Magical World) and sheet timer (Disney Television Animation, Iznogoud, CatDog, Universal Animation Studios, Clifford's Really Big Movie, LeapFrog, Tutenstein, Avengers Assemble, Central Park), dies at age 72.
- February 20:
  - Robert Schaefer, American background artist (Hanna-Barbera, The Nine Lives of Fritz the Cat, The Mouse and His Child, Ruby-Spears Enterprises, Heavy Metal, Marvel Productions, Fred Wolf Films, Alvin and the Chipmunks, The Real Ghostbusters, Warner Bros. Animation, Bucky O'Hare and the Toad Wars!, FernGully: The Last Rainforest, Universal Cartoon Studios, Wild West C.O.W.-Boys of Moo Mesa, Marvel Animation, Disney Television Animation), storyboard artist (Spider-Man and His Amazing Friends) and art director (Lady and the Tramp II: Scamp's Adventure), dies at age 82.
  - Gisele Recinos, American animator (Who Framed Roger Rabbit, DreamWorks Animation), dies at an unknown age.
- February 23: Vladimir Zuykov, Russian animator and illustrator, (Film, Film, Film, Winnie-the-Pooh, About an Old Man, an Old Woman and Their Hen Ryaba), dies at age 86 from COVID-19.
- February 25: Masako Sugaya, Japanese voice actress (voice of Maki Aikawa in Aim for the Ace!, Remi in Nobody's Boy: Remi, Ganko in Perman), dies at age 83.
- February 27: Tasuku Saitō, Japanese animation producer (Gegege no Kitarō, Shōnen Ninja Kaze no Fujimaru, Tiger Mask), dies at age 87.

=== March ===
- March 1: Arvo Nuut, Estonian film operator and film producer (Tallinnfilm, Nukufilm), dies at age 79.
- March 4: Jane Tucker, American animator (Walt Disney Animation Studios), dies at an unknown age.
- March 9: James Levine, American conductor (Fantasia 2000), dies at age 77.
- March 15: Yasuo Ōtsuka, Japanese animator (Panda and the Magic Serpent, Alakazam the Great, The Wonderful World of Puss 'n Boots, Lupin III), dies at age 89.
- March 16: Minako Shiba, Japanese animator and character designer (Noir, Black Butler, Hikaru no Go), dies at age 50.
- March 17: Jacques Frantz, French actor (voice of Obelix in Asterix and the Vikings), dies at age 73.
- March 18: Richard Gilliland, American actor (voice of McHenry in Kim Possible: A Sitch in Time, Frank in the Batman: The Animated Series episode "I've Got Batman in My Basement"), dies at age 71.
- March 19:
  - Gary Leib, American cartoonist, musician and animator (founder of the animation studio Twinkle), dies at age 65–66.
  - Richard Bowman, American animator, director (ChalkZone, Danny Phantom) and sheet timer (X-Men, The Simpsons, Muppet Babies, Captain Planet and the Planeteers, Æon Flux, Men in Black: The Series, My Friends Tigger & Pooh), dies at age 70.
- March 23: George Segal, American actor (voice of J.B. in Aaahh!!! Real Monsters, Eli in Adventures from the Book of Virtues, Dr. Benton C. Quest in The Real Adventures of Jonny Quest, Horror in Billy & Mandy's Big Boogey Adventure, Peter Trickell in Scooby-Doo! Mystery Incorporated, Bernie in American Dad!, Nick in The Simpsons, Dr. Eli Selig in The Zeta Project episode "Absolute Zero"), dies at age 87.
- March 24: Jessica Walter, American actress (voice of Ashley Walker-Club-Dupree in The Magic School Bus, Demoness in The Life and Times of Juniper Lee, Old One in The Land Before Time, Malory Archer in Archer, Mrs. Wyatt in Scooby-Doo! Mystery Incorporated, Tabitha in Turbo: F.A.S.T., Miss Heinous in Star vs. the Forces of Evil, Granny Goodness in Harley Quinn, Athena in the Justice League Action episode "The Trouble With Truth"), dies at age 80.

=== April ===
- April 4: Ralph Schuckett, American keyboardist, composer and songwriter (4Kids Entertainment), dies at age 73.
- April 6: Walter Olkewicz, American actor (voice of Falcone in Batman: The Animated Series), dies at age 72.
- April 9: DMX, American rapper and actor (voiced himself in the South Park episode "Chef Aid"), dies from a cocaine-induced heart attack at age 50.
- April 10: Edwin E. Aguilar, Salvadoran-American animator (The Simpsons, The Oblongs) and storyboard artist (The Simpsons, Brickleberry), dies from a stroke at age 46.
- April 15:
  - Dário de Castro, Brazilian actor (dub voice of Martian Manhunter in the DC Animated Universe and The Batman, Rocky in Chicken Run, Agent Six in Generator Rex, Phoebus in The Hunchback of Notre Dame, I.M. Weasel in I Am Weasel, Dr. Cockroach in Monsters vs. Aliens, John Smith in Pocahontas and Pocahontas II: Journey to a New World, Space Ghost in Space Ghost Coast to Coast, Clayton in Tarzan), dies from COVID-19 at age 72.
  - Helen McCrory, English actress (voice of Mrs. Bean in Fantastic Mr. Fox, Lucy Fletcher in Phineas and Ferb), dies from breast cancer at age 52.
- April 17:
  - Osamu Kobayashi, Japanese animator, animation director and illustrator (Ani*Kuri15, Naruto, Grandia), dies from colon infection at age 57.
  - Felix Silla, American actor (additional voices in The Lord of the Rings), dies at age 84.
- April 19:
  - Bunny Munns, American color key artist (Ruby-Spears Enterprises, Warner Bros. Animation, Toonsylvania) and ink & paint supervisor (Warner Bros. Animation), dies at an unknown age.
  - Kelsey Mulrooney, American actress (voice of Female Ants in A Bug's Life), dies at age 33.
- April 20: Ana Lúcia Menezes, Brazilian actress (dub voice of Amy Rose in Sonic X and Sonic Boom, Margaret in Regular Show, Gwen Tennyson in Ben 10, Misa Amane in Death Note, Koto in Yu Yu Hakusho, Toph Beifong in Avatar: The Last Airbender, the title character in Hilda, Rosalie Rowan in The Zeta Project, Ikon Eron in Gormiti), dies from a stroke at age 46.
- April 21: Terry O'Reilley, Canadian layout artist (The Raccoons, The Adventures of Teddy Ruxpin, The Secret World of Benjamin Bear, Cyberchase, Wild Kratts, Atomic Puppet, Hilda, If You Give a Mouse a Cookie), dies at an unknown age.
- April 24: Shunsuke Kikuchi, Japanese composer (Doraemon, Dragon Ball, Dr. Slump, Getter Robo, Tiger Mask), dies at age 89.
- April 25: Roy Naisbitt, English animator and layout artist (A Christmas Carol, Who Framed Roger Rabbit, Balto, Space Jam, The Last Belle), dies at age 90.
- April 29: Billie Hayes, American actress (voice of Orgoch in The Black Cauldron, Mother Mae-Eye in Teen Titans and Teen Titans Go!, Mrs. Neederladner in Transformers: Rescue Bots, Granny Applecheeks in The Grim Adventures of Billy & Mandy episode "Puddle Jumping", Crazy Edie in the TaleSpin episode "The Sound and the Furry"), dies at age 96.

=== May ===
- May 1:
  - Olympia Dukakis, American actress (voice of Zelda in The Simpsons episode "The Old Man and the Key"), dies at age 89.
  - Sam Cornell, American animator (George of the Jungle, The Hugga Bunch, Jetsons: The Movie, animated the main titles for The Wuzzles and The New Woody Woodpecker Show), background artist (Shinbone Alley), storyboard artist (George of the Jungle, The Rugrats Movie), writer and director (The New 3 Stooges), dies at age 82.
- May 4: Mark Barrows, American animator (BraveStarr, Walt Disney Animation Studios, The Simpsons Movie), dies at age 60.
- May 7: Tawny Kitaen, American actress, model and media personality (voice of Annabelle in Eek! The Cat), dies from dilated cardiomyopathy at age 59.
- May 10: Mike Yang, American animatic editor (Adelaide Productions, Family Guy, American Dad!, Ben 10: Omniverse), dies at an unknown age.
- May 13: Olivier Jean-Marie, French animator (Robo Story, Albert the 5th Musketeer, Dr. Zitbag's Transylvania Pet Shop), background artist (Clémentine), storyboard artist (Spiff and Hercules, Li'l Elvis and the Truckstoppers, Snow White: The Sequel), writer (Rabbids Invasion) and director (Les Minikeums, Xilam, creator of Zig & Sharko, co-creator of Rolling with the Ronks!), dies from cancer at age 60.
- May 15: Marisha Noroski, American animation checker (Pac-Man, BraveStarr, Warner Bros. Feature Animation, Eight Crazy Nights), dies at an unknown age.
- May 19: David Anthony Kraft, American comics writer, critic, publisher and animation screenwriter (G.I. Joe Extreme, Street Fighter), dies at age 68.
- May 23: Eric Carle, American author, designer and illustrator (The Very Hungry Caterpillar and Other Stories), dies from kidney failure at age 91.
- May 24: Samuel E. Wright, American actor and singer (voice of Sebastian in The Little Mermaid franchise, Raw Toonage, Marsupilami, and House of Mouse, Kron in Dinosaur), dies from prostate cancer at age 74.
- May 26: Paul Soles, Canadian actor (voice of Hermey in Rudolph the Red-Nosed Reindeer, Spider-Man in Spider-Man), dies at age 90.
- May 27: Phillip Young, American animator (Walt Disney Animation Studios, Sinbad: Legend of the Seven Seas, Looney Tunes: Back in Action), dies at age 80.
- May 29:
  - Marcell Jankovics, Hungarian graphic artist, film director, and author (Sisyphus, The Struggle), dies at age 79.
  - Gavin MacLeod, American actor (voice of Captain Gumble in the Pound Puppies episode "Bone Voyage", Daniel in The Greatest Adventure: Stories from the Bible episode "Daniel and the Lion's Den", himself in the Pinky and The Brain episode "The Pinky and the Brain Reunion Special"), dies at age 90.
- May 30: Don Duga, American designer, storyboard artist, director and educator (Frosty the Snowman, The Little Drummer Boy, The Last Unicorn), dies at age 87.
- May 31: Arlene Golonka, American actress (voice of Debbie in Speed Buggy, Queen in The Super Powers Team: Galactic Guardians episode "The Wild Cards", additional voices in The New Yogi Bear Show and The New Scooby-Doo Movies), dies at age 85.

=== June ===
- June 6: Ron Allen, American production assistant (The Little Mermaid, FernGully: The Last Rainforest), dies at an unknown age.
- June 7: Larry Gelman, American actor (voice of Young Quist in the Freakazoid! episode "Lawn Gnomes: Chapter IV – Fun in the Sun"), dies at age 90.
- June 11: Kay Hawtrey, Canadian actress (voice of Emily's Grandmother in Little Bear, Grandma in Max & Ruby, Miss Primrose in The Raccoons episode "Making the Grade!"), dies at age 94.
- June 13: Ned Beatty, American actor (voice of Lotso in Toy Story 3, Tortoise John in Rango), dies at age 83.

=== July ===
- July 1: Philece Sampler, American actress (voice of Mimi Tachikawa in the Digimon franchise, Betty Ross in The Incredible Hulk, Kelly in Transformers: Robots in Disguise, Binka in Shinzo, Makimachi Misao in Rurouni Kenshin, Lester Goldberg in Stanley, Silvia in Viewtiful Joe, Beauty in Bobobo-bo Bo-bobo, Jimera in Duel Masters, Hiyori Tamura in Lucky Star, Toph Beifong in The Legend of Korra, Sabine Cheng and Ms. Mendeleiev in Miraculous: Tales of Ladybug & Cat Noir, Granny and Mother Goose in Goldie & Bear, Rumy, Hermit Crab and Sea Turtle in Treehouse Detectives, Fantine and Cosette in the Duckman episode "Psyche", Francine in the All Grown Up! episode "Fools Rush In", Mildred Scalise in The Loud House episode "Recipe for Disaster"), dies from a heart attack at age 67.
- July 3: Dave Thomson, American animator and scene-planner (Walt Disney Animation Studios, Bebe's Kids, The Pagemaster, Cats Don't Dance), dies at age 75.
- July 7: Chick Vennera, American actor (voice of Pesto in Animaniacs, Lorenzo in The Real Adventures of Jonny Quest, Ferret in Static Shock, Chauffeur in the Batman Beyond episode "Ace in the Hole"), dies from cancer at age 74.
- July 13: Don Jurwich, American animation writer, director and producer (Hanna-Barbera, Marvel Productions), dies at age 87.
- July 16: Biz Markie, American rapper, DJ and record producer (portrayed himself in the "Biz's Beat" segment of Yo Gabba Gabba!, voice of Beatbox Baggins, Odie's Security Guard and Elf in Mad, Tiny Timmy Scratch It in the Randy Cunningham: 9th Grade Ninja episode "Hip Hopocalypse Now", Snorlock in the Adventure Time episode "Slow Love", the title character in the SpongeBob SquarePants episode "Kenny the Cat", performed the song "That's The Way (I Like It)" in Space Jam), dies from a stroke at age 57.
- July 20: Jerry Granelli, American-Canadian jazz drummer (A Charlie Brown Christmas), dies at age 80.
- July 22: Noreen Beasley, American character designer and inbetweener (Ruby-Spears Enterprises, Walt Disney Animation Studios), dies at an unknown age.
- July 24:
  - Jackie Mason, American comedian and actor (voice of Rabbi Hyman Krustofski in The Simpsons, The Sandman in The Fairly OddParents episode "Beddy Bye"), dies at age 93.
  - Alfie Scopp, English-Canadian voice actor (voice of Charlie-in-The-Box in Rudolph the Red-Nosed Reindeer), dies at age 101.
- July 28:
  - Ron Popeil, American inventor and marketing personality (voiced himself in the Futurama episode "A Big Piece of Garbage"), dies from a brain hemorrhage at age 86.
  - Julie Benenati, American animation checker (Cartoon Network Studios), dies at age 51.
  - Dusty Hill, American musician and band member of ZZ Top (voiced himself in the King of the Hill episode "Hank Gets Dusted"), dies at age 72.
- July 30: Thea White, American voice actress (voice of Muriel Bagge in Courage the Cowardly Dog and Straight Outta Nowhere: Scooby-Doo! Meets Courage the Cowardly Dog), dies at age 81.

=== August ===
- August 3: Fred Ladd, American writer and producer (American dubs of Astro Boy, Gigantor, Kimba the White Lion, creative consultant for the DiC dub of Sailor Moon), dies at age 94.
- August 7: Jane Withers, American actress (voice of Laverne in The Hunchback of Notre Dame and The Hunchback of Notre Dame II), dies at age 95.
- August 9: Zairaini Sarbini, Malaysian voice actress (dub voice of Candace Flynn in Phineas and Ferb, Sam in Totally Spies, Conan Edogawa in Case Closed, Sakura Haruno and Hinata Hyuga in Naruto, Katara in Avatar: The Last Airbender, and Sandy Cheeks in SpongeBob SquarePants), dies at age 48.
- August 10: Giorgio Lopez, Italian voice actor (dub voice of King Harold in the Shrek franchise and Scrooge McDuck from Disney), dies at age 74.
- August 12: Peter R. Brown, Canadian-American animator (Ferngully: The Last Rainforest, A Goofy Movie, The Little Lulu Show, All Dogs Go to Heaven 2, Space Jam) and overseas supervisor (Recess, Lilo & Stitch: The Series, Lloyd in Space, Family Guy), dies from cancer at an unknown age.
- August 13:
  - Robert E. Stanton, American background artist (Filmation, Alvin and the Chipmunks, Walt Disney Animation Studios, Curious George), dies at age 60.
  - Enzo Facciolo, Italian comics artist and animator (worked for Toni Pagot), dies at age 89.
- August 17: Masami Suda, Japanese animator and character designer (Fist of the North Star, Slam Dunk, Speed Racer), dies at age 77.
- August 21: Fernando Ruiz Álvarez, Mexican animator (The Sword in the Stone) and director (Los Tres Reyes Magos, La Bruja Chiriloca, Los Telerines, The Adventures of Oliver Twist), dies from a heart attack at age 79.
- August 26: French Tickner, American actor (English voice of Kagome's grandfather in Inuyasha, Watari in Death Note), dies at age 91.
- August 28: Jacques Drouin, Canadian animator and director (National Film Board of Canada), dies at age 78.
- August 29:
  - Ed Asner, American actor and president of the Screen Actors Guild (voice of Carl Fredricksen in Up, Kid Potato in WordGirl, Napoleon the Black Cat in W.I.T.C.H. Sergeant Cosgrove in Freakazoid! and the Teen Titans Go! episode "Huggbees", Roland Daggett in Batman: The Animated Series, Hudson in Gargoyles, Fixer in the Buzz Lightyear of Star Command episode "The Return of XL", Editor in The Simpsons episode Guess Who's Coming to Criticize Dinner?, Stinky in King of the Hill, Mr. Voorhees in Grim & Evil, Officer Barr in Spider-Man: The New Animated Series, Ed Wuncler Sr. in The Boondocks, Uncle Ben in The Spectacular Spider-Man, Steve Bellows in the Family Guy episode "One If by Clam, Two If by Sea", Angry Old Timer in the SpongeBob SquarePants episode "Whirly Brains", Granny Goodness in Superman: The Animated Series, Justice League Unlimited, and Superman/Batman: Apocalypse, J. Jonah Jameson in Spider-Man, Santa Claus in Elf: Buddy's Musical Christmas, A StoryBots Christmas, Regular Show, Olive, the Other Reindeer, and The Story of Santa Claus, and Kent Nelson in the Young Justice episode "Denial"), dies at age 91.
  - Jamie Kezlarian Bolio, American marketer and animator (Rocko's Modern Life, We're Back! A Dinosaur's Story, Walt Disney Animation Studios, The Illusionist), dies at age 54.
- August 30: Linda Kahn, American television executive (Nickelodeon, Scholastic Entertainment), dies from breast cancer at age 72.
- August 31: Theresa Plummer-Andrews, English animation television producer (CBBC), dies at age 77.

=== September ===
- September 6: Michael K. Williams, American actor, dancer, model and choreographer (voice of Lucius in High School USA!, Satan and Nigerian Dude in Lucas Bros. Moving Co., Smokey Greenwood in F Is for Family, Unnamed Citizen in the Aqua Teen Hunger Force episode "Allen Part Two"), dies from a drug overdose at age 54.
- September 7: Eiichi Yamamoto, Japanese animation director and screenwriter (Kimba the White Lion, Cleopatra, Belladonna of Sadness), dies at age 80.
- September 9: Marion Wells, American television writer (Hanna-Barbera, Disney Television Animation, Adventures from the Book of Virtues), dies at age 73.
- September 14: Norm Macdonald, Canadian comedian, writer and actor (voice of Death in the Family Guy episode "Death Is a Bitch", Norm the Genie in The Fairly OddParents, Pigeon in Mike Tyson Mysteries, Glumshanks in Skylanders Academy, Mogens in Klaus), dies at age 61.
- September 18: Leo De Lyon, American actor (voice of Spook and Brain in Top Cat, Flunky in The Jungle Book), dies at age 96.
- September 23:
  - David H. DePatie, American film and television producer (Last executive of Warner Bros Cartoons, co-founder of DePatie-Freleng Enterprises and executive producer at Marvel Productions), dies at age 91.
  - Troy A. Gustafson, American animator (Walt Disney Animation Studios), dies from leukemia at age 59.
- September 24: Takao Saitō, Japanese manga artist (Golgo 13), dies at age 84.
- September 28: Myrna Gibbs, American ink & paint artist (The Flintstones, DePatie-Freleng Enterprises, Marvel Productions, Peanuts specials), dies at age 84.
- September 29: Mike Renzi, American composer, music director, pianist and jazz musician (Sesame Street), dies at age 80.
- September 30: Koichi Sugiyama, Japanese music composer (Cyborg 009, Space Runaway Ideon, Dragon Quest: The Adventure of Dai), dies at age 90.

=== October ===
- October 5:
  - Kathleen Quaife-Hodge, American animator (Walt Disney Animation Studios, Sullivan Bluth Studios, Universal Cartoon Studios, FernGully: The Last Rainforest, The Thief and the Cobbler, Asterix Conquers America, The Pagemaster, Warner Bros. Feature Animation, Hanna-Barbera, Nickelodeon Animation Studio, God, the Devil and Bob, The Proud Family, I Want a Dog for Christmas, Charlie Brown, Mickey, Donald, Goofy: The Three Musketeers, Da Boom Crew, Bah, Humduck! A Looney Tunes Christmas, Slacker Cats), dies at age 64.
  - Pavao Štalter, Croatian animator, director, screenwriter, scenographer and artist, dies at age 92.
- October 10: Ruthie Tompson, American animator and camera technician (Walt Disney Animation Studios), dies at age 111.
- October 11: Brian Goldner, American business chief executive and film producer (CEO of Hasbro from 2008 to 2021), dies from prostate cancer at age 58.
- October 16:
  - Denise Bryer, English voice actress (voice of Twizzle in The Adventures of Twizzle, Commander Makara in Star Fleet, Noddy in The Noddy Shop), dies at age 93.
  - Lew Ott, American animator (Hanna-Barbera, Hot Wheels, Fritz the Cat), character designer (Hanna-Barbera, Filmation, Marvel Productions), background artist (The Transformers: The Movie, G.I. Joe: The Movie, Hanna-Barbera) and production designer (Ruby-Spears Enterprises), dies at age 94.
- October 18:
  - Jack Angel, American voice actor (voice of Hawkman, Flash, and Samurai in Super Friends, King Zarkon in Voltron, Ramjet, Astrotrain, and various other characters in The Transformers, Liquidator in Darkwing Duck, Chunk in Toy Story 3, Comrade Chaos in El Tigre: The Adventures of Manny Rivera, Nick Fury in Spider-Man, Thor in Spider-Man, Technorg in the Ben 10 episode "Grudge Match", additional voices in DuckTales the Movie: Treasure of the Lost Lamp, The Rescuers Down Under, The Hunchback of Notre Dame, The Iron Giant, Monsters, Inc., The Lorax, and Despicable Me 2), dies at age 90.
  - Christopher Ayres, American actor and ADR director (Funimation), dies at age 56.
- October 20: Sean Gallimore, American animator (Thumbelina, A Troll in Central Park, The Pagemaster, Walt Disney Animation Studios, Looney Tunes: Back in Action, Space Jam: A New Legacy), dies at age 56.
- October 21: Saori Sugimoto, Japanese voice actress (voice of Sanae Minami in Green Green, Catherine Bloom in Mobile Suit Gundam Wing, Ramurin Makiba and Nyakkii Momoyama in Shima Shima Tora no Shimajirō), dies at age 58.
- October 22:
  - Marlene Robinson May, American animator and sheet timer (Alvin and the Chipmunks, DuckTales, Darkwing Duck, CatDog, Ed, Edd n Eddy), dies at age 82.
  - Peter Scolari, American actor (voice of John Hammer and The Shark/Gunther Hardwicke in Batman: The Animated Series, Preston Vogel in Gargoyles, Brad in the Duckman episode "From Brad to Worse", Wilford B. Wolf in the Animaniacs episode "Moon Over Minerva", Professor Higgenson in the What's New, Scooby-Doo? episode "Scooby-Doo Christmas", Ray Palmer/Atom in the Batman: The Brave and the Bold episode "Sword of the Atom!"), dies at age 66.
- October 27: Lynn Spees, American animator (The Secret of NIMH, FernGully: The Last Rainforest), dies at age 76.
- October 29: Yoshiko Ōta, Japanese voice actress (voice of Nobita in Doraemon, Urasae in Inuyasha, Peebo in Choudenshi Bioman, Akko Kagami in Akko's Secret), dies at age 89.

=== November ===
- November 3: Bob Baker, English screenwriter (Wallace & Gromit), dies at age 82.
- November 5: Kinji Yoshimoto, Japanese animator, film director (Legend of Lemnear, I Couldn't Become a Hero, So I Reluctantly Decided to Get a Job, Unbreakable Machine-Doll, Seven Mortal Sins) and composer, dies at age 55.
- November 7: Dean Stockwell, American actor (voice of Duke Nukem in Captain Planet and the Planeteers, adult Tim Drake in Batman Beyond: Return of the Joker), dies at age 85.
- November 10: Chris Duncan, American background painter, visual effects artist and designer (Warner Bros. Animation, Nickelodeon Animation Studio), dies at age 58.
- November 11: Graeme Edge, English musician, songwriter and poet (voiced himself in The Simpsons episode "Viva Ned Flanders"), dies from metastatic cancer at age 80.
- November 13:
  - David Fox, Canadian actor (voice of Captain Haddock in The Adventures of Tintin, Sentinels and Master Mold in X-Men), dies from cancer at age 80.
  - Joe Siracusa, American film and music editor (Popeye the Sailor, What's New, Mr. Magoo?, The Alvin Show, DePatie-Freleng Enterprises, Marvel Productions), dies at age 99.
- November 17: Dave Frishberg, American composer and lyricist (wrote "I'm Just a Bill" from Schoolhouse Rock!), dies at age 88.
- November 18: Keith Dinicol, Canadian actor (voice of Willow 1 in Anne of Green Gables: The Animated Series), dies from a stroke at age 69.
- November 19: Will Ryan, American voice actor, singer and musician (voice of Petrie in The Land Before Time, Stuey in Rock-a-Doodle, Royal and Tika in The Pebble and the Penguin, Scrooge McDuck in Sport Goofy in Soccermania, Grubby in The Adventures of Teddy Ruxpin, The Seahorse Herald in The Little Mermaid, Papa Bear in Looney Tunes: Back in Action, the title characters in the Courage the Cowardly Dog episode "The Duck Brothers", various characters in Hi Hi Puffy AmiYumi, continued voice of Willie the Giant and Pete), dies at age 72.
- November 20: Nobuaki Sekine, Japanese voice actor (voice of Takeshi Umihara in Cosmo Warrior Zero, Kenichi in Kimba the White Lion), dies from a cerebral infarction at age 87.
- November 22: Doug MacLeod, Australian author and screenwriter (co-creator of Dogstar), dies at age 62.
- November 26: Stephen Sondheim, American composer and lyricist (voiced himself and composed the song "The Ballad of Buzz Cola" in The Simpsons episode "Yokel Chords"), dies at age 91.

=== December ===
- December 1: Keiko Nobumoto, Japanese screenwriter (Cowboy Bebop, Samurai Champloo, Wolf's Rain, Tokyo Godfathers), dies at age 57.
- December 3: Jōji Yanami, Japanese voice actor (voice of Totousai in Inuyasha, Boodle and Ganfall in One Piece, the Narrator in Dragon Ball), dies at age 90.
- December 4: Tom Shannon, American animator (Filmation, The Super Mario Bros. Super Show!, Walt Disney Animation Studios), dies at age 71.
- December 5: Scott Page-Pagter, American voice actor, television producer, composer, sound effects artist and voice director (Saban Entertainment), dies at age 52.
- December 8: Mitsutoshi Furuya, Japanese manga artist (Dame Oyaji), dies at age 85.
- December 9: Don Asmussen, American cartoonist (Monkeybone), dies at age 59.
- December 13:
  - Giannalberto Bendazzi, Italian animation historian (Cartoons - 100 Years of Cinema Animation), dies at age 75.
  - Vera Lanpher-Pacheco, American animator (Walt Disney Animation Studios) and voice actor (voice of Daphne in Dragon's Lair), dies at age 66.
  - Andrey Ignatenko, Russian animator (The Tale of Tsar Saltan, The Adventures of Lolo the Penguin, Varga Studio), dies at age 64.
- December 16:
  - Gérald Forton, Belgian-born French comic book artist, animator (The Legend of White Fang, Skeleton Warriors), storyboard artist (Kid 'n Play, The Legend of Prince Valiant, Wild West C.O.W.-Boys of Moo Mesa, Red Planet, Rugrats, Skeleton Warriors, Darkstalkers, X-Men: The Animated Series, Road Rovers, Street Fighter, Extreme Ghostbusters, Men in Black: The Series, The Prince of Atlantis, Invasion America, RoboCop: Alpha Commando, The King and I), character designer (Filmation, DIC Entertainment, James Bond Jr.), background artist (The Pirates of Dark Water, Tiny Toon Adventures, Teenage Mutant Ninja Turtles, The Prince of Atlantis) and production designer (Filmation), dies at age 90.
  - Derrick J. Wyatt, American character designer (Warner Bros. Animation, Cartoon Network Studios, Bless the Harts) and storyboard artist (The Ripping Friends), dies at age 49.
  - Catherine Peterson, American ink & paint artist (Hanna-Barbera, The Secret of NIMH, Shelley Duvall's Bedtime Stories, Cool World) and animation checker (Hanna-Barbera, Walt Disney Animation Studios), dies at age 66.
- December 17: Frank Mula, American television writer and producer (The Simpsons), dies at age 71.
- December 18: Sayaka Kanda, Japanese actress and singer (dub voice of Anna in the Frozen franchise, and the Titular Character of SpongeBob SquarePants Franchise), dies at age 35.
- December 22: Kirk Benson, American film editor (King of the Hill, American Dad!, The Cleveland Show, Family Guy), dies at age 60.
- December 24: Barry Bruce, American animation director and designer (Will Vinton Studios, Return to Oz, Sesame Street), dies at age 77.
- December 25: Michael Camarillo, American animator (Bebe's Kids, The Swan Princess, Quest for Camelot, The Road to El Dorado, Spirit: Stallion of the Cimarron, The Powerpuff Girls Movie), background artist (The Simpsons) and prop designer (Foster's Home for Imaginary Friends, Sym-Bionic Titan), dies from an undiagnosed heart condition at age 57.
- December 28: John Madden, American football player, coach and sports commentator (voiced himself in The Simpsons episode "Sunday, Cruddy Sunday"), dies at age 85.
- December 30:
  - Stephen J. Lawrence, American composer (Sesame Street, The Wubbulous World of Dr. Seuss), dies at age 82.
  - David Schwartz, American animator, storyboard artist (ALF Tales, The Real Ghostbusters, The Simpsons, Disney Television Animation, Yo Yogi!, Warner Bros. Animation, Rugrats, Fantastic Four, The Incredible Hulk, Clerks: The Animated Series, Courage the Cowardly Dog, X-Men: Evolution, Tutenstein, Curious George, Class of 3000, TMNT, The Spectacular Spider-Man, Wolverine and the X-Men, Sit Down, Shut Up, Ben 10: Destroy All Aliens, Sheriff Callie's Wild West, Doc McStuffins, The VeggieTales Show), writer (Johnny Bravo, Ben 10, New Looney Tunes) and director (Captain Simian & the Space Monkeys, Jumanji, Channel Umptee-3, Johnny Bravo), dies at age 67.
- December 31: Betty White, American actress and comedian (voice of Gretchen Claus in The Story of Santa Claus, Dorothy in The Lionhearts, Aunt Polly in Tom Sawyer, Sophie Hunter in The Wild Thornberrys, Delia, Dorothy and Ellen in King of the Hill, Grandmama in Higglytown Heroes, Yoshie in Ponyo, Dora and Grandma Sheila Martin in Glenn Martin, DDS, Mrs. Claus in Prep & Landing: Operation: Secret Santa, Agatha McLeish in Pound Puppies, Grammy Norma in The Lorax, Bitey White in Toy Story 4 and the Forky Asks a Question episode "What is Love?", Mrs. Sarah Vanderwhoozie in Trouble, Hestia in the Hercules episode "Hercules and the Tiff on Olympus", Granny in the Teacher's Pet episode "The Turkey That Came for Dinner", Mrs. Doolin in the Grim & Evil episode "Who Killed Who?", Gary's Mother in the Gary the Rat episode "This Is Not a Pipe", Grandma Wilson in the Father of the Pride episode "Donkey", Old Lady in the Mickey Mouse episode "New York Weenie", Beatrice in the SpongeBob SquarePants episode "Mall Girl Pearl", herself in The Simpsons episodes "Missionary: Impossible" and "Homerazzi", and the Family Guy episode "Peterotica"), dies from a stroke at age 99.

=== Specific date unknown ===
- Dean Spille, American background artist (Peanuts specials, Frosty Returns, Bucky O'Hare and the Toad Wars, Garfield and Friends), dies at age 94.
- Steve McGrath, American modeler (Toy Story 2, DreamWorks Animation), dies at an unknown age.
- F.T. Ziegler, American camera operator (Filmation, Once Upon a Forest), dies at an unknown age.
- Dick Robbins, American television writer (Spider-Man, Hanna-Barbera, The Transformers, Defenders of the Earth), dies at an unknown age.

== See also ==
- 2021 in anime
- List of animated television series of 2021
