= List of animated television series of 2021 =

This is a list of animated television series first aired in 2021.

Title	Seasons	Episodes	Country	Year	Original channel	Technique
ABC with Kenny G	4	26	Canada	2021	TVOKids	Flash
Ada Twist, Scientist	4	41	United States	2021–23	Netflix	CGI
Adventure Beast	1	12	United States	2021	Netflix	Flash
The Adventures of Bernie	1	30	France	2021–22	Gulli; M6	Flash
Akki Jaanbaaz	1	26	India	2021	Gubbare	
Alma's Way	3	66	Canada; United States	2021–present	PBS Kids	Flash
Alva's World	1	36	Ireland	2021	RTÉjr	Flash
Ana Pumpkin	1	52	France	2021	France 5	Flash
Anna and Rachel	2	104	Canada; Spain; Italy; United Kingdom	2021–present	YTV; Okoo; RTÉ Kids	Flash/Stock
Aquaman: King of Atlantis	1	3	United States	2021	HBO Max	Traditional
Arcane	2	18	France; United States	2021–24	Netflix	CGI
Arnoldo's Ristorantino	1	10	Argentina	2021	Disney+ Disney Junior	CGI/Live-action
B.O.T. and The Beasties	2	50	United Kingdom	2021–22	CBebbies	Flash
Ba Da Bean	1	52	Brazil	2021–present	Discovery+	Flash
Babble Bop!	1	72	United States	2021–present	Peacock	CGI
The BeatBuds, Let's Jam!	1	10	United States; France; Canada	2021	Nickelodeon / Paramount+	Flash
Big Blue	1	26	Canada	2021–22	CBC Kids / Radio Canada	Flash
Big Words, Small Stories	1	52	Australia; Canada	2021	ABC Kids; TVOKids	Flash
Bionic Max	1	52	France	2021	Gulli; Canal J	Flash
Birdgirl	2	12	United States	2021–22	Adult Swim	Flash
Blippi Wonders	1	28	United States	2021–present	YouTube	CGI
Brave Bunnies	1	50	United Kingdom	2021–present	Milkshake!	Flash
The Brilliant World of Tom Gates	3	60	United Kingdom	2021–24	Sky Kids	Flash
Centaurworld	2	18	United States	2021	Netflix	Flash
Chicago Party Aunt	1	16	United States	2021–22	Netflix	Flash
The Chicken Squad	1	29	United States	2021–22	Disney Junior	CGI
Chip 'n' Dale: Park Life	2	30	France	2021–24	Disney+	Flash
Circle Square	1	40	United Kingdom; Ireland	2021–present	Milkshake!	Flash
City of Ghosts	1	6	United States; France	2021	Netflix	CGI
Color Crew Magic		26	United States	2021	BabyFirst	Flash/Live-Action
Coolics	1	52	Russia	2021	Karusel	Flash
The Country of Rare Treasure	1	10	China	2021		Traditional
The Croods: Family Tree	8	52	United States	2021–23	Hulu; Peacock	CGI
Dabangg: The Animated Series	1	104	India	2021	Cartoon Network	
Deer Squad	4	80	China	2021–present	iQIYI; Nickelodeon (Worldwide)	CGI
Devil May Care	1	6	United States	2021	Syfy	Flash
Dino Ranch	3	65	Canada	2021–24	CBC Kids	CGI
DinoCity	1	52	United Kingdom	2021–present	Tiny Pop	Flash
Disco Dragon	1	52	France	2021	France 4	Flash
Do, Re & Mi	1	26	France; United States	2021–22	Amazon Prime Video	CGI
Dogmatix and the Indomitables	1	52	France	2021	M6	CGI
Dogs in Space	2	20	United States	2021–22	Netflix	Flash
Dota: Dragon's Blood	3	24	South Korea; United States	2021–22	Netflix	Traditional
DreamWorks Dragons: The Nine Realms	8	52	United States	2021–23	Hulu; Peacock	CGI
Dug Days	1	6	United States	2021–23	Disney+	CGI
Ekans: Ek Se Badhkar Snake	6	102	India	2021–present	Cartoon Network	CGI
Elliott from Earth	1	16	United Kingdom	2021	Cartoon Network	Flash
Elmo & Tango's Mysterious Mysteries	1	52	United States	2021–present	PBS Kids	Flash
The Enchanted Village of Pinocchio	1	26	France	2021	France 5	CGI
The Epic Time Leap	1	10	France	2021	Adult Swim	Flash
Fairfax	2	16	United States	2021–22	Amazon Prime Video	Flash
Fracasitos	2	TBA	Argentina	2021	Cartoon Network	Flash
Frankelda's Book of Spooks	1	5	Mexico	2021	HBO Max	Stop-Motion
The Freak Brothers	3	22	United States	2021–present	Tubi	Flash
Gabby's Dollhouse	14	90	United States	2021–present	Netflix	CGI/Live-Action
The Game Catchers	2	104	Italy	2021–24	Rai Yoyo	Flash
Get Rolling with Otis	2	18	United States	2021–22	Apple TV+	CGI
The Ghost and Molly McGee	2	41	United States	2021–24	Disney Channel	Toon Boom Harmony
Ghostforce	2	52	France; South Korea; Italy	2021–present	TFOU; EBS 1 (season 1); Disney Channel (season 1); Netflix (season 2)	CGI
Girls of Olympus	1	26	Italy	2021	Rai Gulp	Flash/Traditional
Glowbies	3	36	Canada	2021–22	CBC Kids	CGI
Go, Dog, Go!	4	40	United States; Canada	2021–23	Netflix	CGI
Goblin Hill	1	30	South Korea	2021–22	Tooniverse	Traditional
The Goodbye Family: The Animated Series	4	27	United States	2021–present	Amazon Prime Video; Tubi	Flash
The Great North	5	97	United States	2021–25	Fox	Flash/Traditional
Gus, the Itsy Bitsy Knight	2	104	France; United Kingdom	2021–24	TF1	CGI
Happy House of Frightenstein	1	10	Canada	2021–present	Family Jr.	Flash
The Harper House	1	10	United States	2021	Paramount+	Flash
Harriet the Spy	2	20	United States	2021–22	Apple TV+	Toon Boom Harmony
He-Man and the Masters of the Universe (2021)	3	26	United States	2021–22	Netflix	CGI
Headspace Guide to Meditation	1	8	United States	2021	The Headspace app Netflix	Flash
Headspace Guide to Sleep	1	7	United States	2021	The Headspace app Netflix	Flash
Heneral Tuna	1	7	Philippines	2021	Kumu	Flash
Hero City Kids Force	1	13	Philippines	2021–22	iWantTFC	Flash
High Guardian Spice	1	12	United States	2021	Crunchyroll	Traditional
Hit-Monkey	1	10	United States	2021	Hulu	Traditional
Honey Bear Bery	1	26	South Korea	2021	Netflix	Flash
HouseBroken	2	22	United States	2021–23	Fox	Traditional/Flash (Toon Boom)
I Heart Arlo	1	20	United States	2021	Netflix	Flash
I'll Get You! Holidays	4	91	Russia	2021–present	Karusel	CGI
Inside Job	1	10	United States	2021–22	Netflix	Flash
Invincible	4	33	United States	2021–present	Amazon Prime Video	Traditional
Jelly, Ben & Pogo	1	20	United States	2021–22	PBS Kids	Flash
Jellystone!	3	77	United States	2021–25	Max	Flash
John Dillermand	2	39	Denmark	2021–present	DR Ramasjang	Stop-Motion
Johnny Test (2021)	2	40	Canada	2021–22	Netflix	Toon Boom Harmony
Joodyssey	1	52	South Korea	2021–present	KBS 1	Flash
Jungle Box	1	100	South Korea	2021	Tooniverse	CGI
Kamp Koral: SpongeBob's Under Years	2	39	United States	2021–24	Paramount+	CGI
Kangaroo Beach	3	72	Australia	2021–present	ABC Kids	CGI
Karma's World	4	40	Canada; Ireland; Indonesia; United States	2021–22	Netflix	CGI
Kayko and Kokosh	2	14	Poland	2021	Netflix	Flash
Kid Cosmic	3	24	United States	2021–22	Netflix	Toon Boom Harmony/Traditional
Kung Fu Sock	1	52	China	2021–22	Tencent Video; CCTV-14	Flash
Larry's Surprise Eggs		18	United States	2021	BabyFirst	Flash
Legends of Dawn: The Sacred Stone	1	3	China; Indonesia; Malaysia; Philippines	2021–present	WeTV/Iflix (International); MDTV; TV9; Kapamilya Channel/A2Z	CGI
Link Click	3	23	China	2021–present	Bilibili	Traditional
Little Ellen	2	20	United States	2021–22	HBO Max	Flash
Lolo & Pau	1	8	Mexico	2021	Pantaya	Flash
The Lopeggs	1	6	Mexico	2021	Pantaya	Flash
Lucas the Spider	1	77	Canada	2021–23	Cartoon Network; Max; Family Channel	CGI
Lupin's Tales	2	156	France; China	2021–present	Youku; France 5	Traditional/Flash/CGI
Maca & Roni	3	179	South Korea	2021–present	KBS 2	CGI (seasons 1–2); Flash (seasons 2–3)
Masameer County	2	14	Saudi Arabia	2021–present	Netflix	Flash
Masters of the Universe: Revelation	2	10	United States	2021	Netflix	Traditional
Maya and the Three	1	9	United States; Mexico	2021	Netflix	CGI
Mechamato	1	13	Malaysia	2021	Cartoon Network	CGI
Meow Magic	1	52	Russia	2021–present	Karusel	Flash
Mickey Mouse Funhouse	3	86	United States	2021–25	Disney Jr.	CGI
Middlemost Post	2	33	United States	2021–22	Nickelodeon	Flash
Milo	2	78	United Kingdom; Spain; Italy	2021–present	Channel 5 Milkshake! PBS Kids	Flash
M.O.D.O.K.	1	10	United States	2021	Hulu	Stop-motion
Moley	1	52	United Kingdom	2021–22	Boomerang	CGI
Mondo Yan	1	52	Spain; Ireland	2021–present	Super3	CGI
Monsters at Work	2	20	United States	2021–24	Disney+ (season 1); Disney Channel (season 2)	CGI
Murder Drones	1	8	Australia	2021–24	YouTube	CGI
Nawak	1	78	France	2021	France 4	Flash
Nefertine on the Nile	1	52	Italy	2021	Rai Yoyo	CGI
Neko Album	1	21	China	2021		Traditional
Nina & Olga	2	104	Italy	2021–present	Rai Yoyo	Flash
Obki	2	30	United Kingdom	2021–22	Sky Kids	CGI
Octonauts: Above & Beyond	6	78	United Kingdom; Canada	2021–26	Netflix	CGI
Odo	1	14	United States	2021–present	HBO Max	Flash
Oggy Oggy	3	52	France	2021–23	Netflix; Okoo	CGI
The Patrick Star Show	5	79	United States	2021–present	Nickelodeon	Traditional
Pim and Pom at the Museum	1	TBA	Netherlands	2021	NPO Zappelin	Flash
Pinocchio and Friends	1	TBA	Italy	2021–24	Rai YoYo	CGI
Pip and Posy	2	73	United Kingdom	2021	Milkshake!	CGI
Pixar Popcorn	1	10	United States	2021	Disney+	CGI
The Pole	1	6	United States	2021	Syfy	Flash
Presto! School of Magic	1	26	France	2021–present	Discovery Kids	CGI
The Prince	1	13	United States	2021	HBO Max	Flash
Q-Force	1	10	United States	2021	Netflix	Flash
Ridley Jones	5	35	United States; Ireland	2021–23	Netflix	CGI
Rockoons	1	52	Russia	2021-present	Karusel	CGI
Royals Next Door	1	52	Ireland	2021–present	RTÉ Kids	Flash
Rugrats (2021)	3	64	United States	2021–26	Paramount+ (2021–23); Nickelodeon (2024); Nickelodeon Global Unlimited (2026)	CGI
Santa Inc.	1	10	United States	2021	HBO Max	Stop-Motion
Saturday Morning All Star Hits!	1	8	United States	2021	Netflix	Flash/Live-Action
Saturday Morning Minions	1	40	United States; China	2021–22	Facebook / Instagram	Flash
Sharkdog	3	22	Singapore; United States	2021–23	Netflix	CGI
The Smurfs (2021)	3	156	Belgium; France; Germany	2021–present	La Trois; TF1; Ketnet; KiKA	CGI
The Snoopy Show	3	39	Canada; United States	2021–23	Apple TV+	Flash
Spidey and His Amazing Friends	5	113	United States; Canada	2021–present	Disney Jr.	CGI
Star Trek: Prodigy	2	40	United States	2021–24	Paramount+ (season 1); Netflix (season 2)	CGI
Star Wars: The Bad Batch	3	47	United States	2021–24	Disney+	CGI
Star Wars: Visions	3	27	United States	2021–present	Disney+	CGI/Stop-Motion/Flash/Traditional
Strawberry Shortcake: Berry in the Big City	3	120	Canada	2021–24	YouTube; Family Jr.	Flash
Summer & Todd: Happy Farmers	1	52	Italy	2021–present	Rai Yoyo	CGI
The Summoner	1	6	United States	2021	Syfy	Flash
Súper Bigote y su mano de hierro	2	73	Venezuela	2021–present	Venezolana de Televisión	Flash
Super Sema	3	45	Kenya	2021–present	YouTube	Flash
Superhero Kindergarten	1	26	United States	2021	Amazon Prime Video	Traditional/Flash
Sweet Tweets	2	57	Canada	2021–22	Knowledge Kids	Flash
Taarak Mehta Kka Chhota Chashmah	3	55	India	2021–present	Sony Yay!	CGI
A Tale Dark & Grimm	1	10	United States	2021	Netflix	CGI
Tangranimals	1	52	France	2021–22	France 5	CGI
Tear Along the Dotted Line	1	6	Italy	2021	Netflix	Flash
Teenage Euthanasia	2	10	United States	2021–23	Adult Swim	Flash
Ten Year Old Tom	2	20	United States	2021–23	HBO Max	Flash
Thomas & Friends: All Engines Go	4	161	United States; Canada	2021–25	Cartoon Network (seasons 1–2); Netflix (seasons 3–4)	Toon Boom Harmony
Tom and Jerry in New York	2	13	United States	2021	HBO Max	Flash
Tom and Jerry Special Shorts	1	2	United States	2021	HBO Max	Traditional
Toon In with Me	6	1,260	United States	2021–present	MeTV	Live-Action/Traditional/Flash
Trascender: Las 3 leyes ancestrales	3	18	Bolivia	2021–25	Bolivia TV	CGI
Trese	1	6	Singapore; United States	2021	Netflix	Traditional
Tuttle Twins	3	34	United States	2021–present	Angel Studios	Flash
Ultra City Smiths	1	6	United States	2021	AMC	Stop-Motion
The Very Small Creatures	3	81	United Kingdom	2021–present	Sky Kids	Stop-Motion
Villainous	1	6	Mexico	2021	Max; Cartoon Network Mexico	Flash
We the People	1	10	United States	2021	Netflix	Flash
What If...?	3	26	United States	2021–24	Disney+	CGI
When I Was Your Age	1	52	France	2021–present	France 4	Flash
Wolf Joe	1	43	Canada	2021–present	TVOKids	Flash
Wolfboy and the Everything Factory	2	20	United Kingdom; United States	2021–22	Apple TV+	Traditional/Flash
Woman in the Book	1	10	United States	2021	Facebook Watch	Flash
Yabba Dabba Dinosaurs	2	26	United States	2021–22	HBO Max	Flash
Zatonya	1	15	Turkey	2021-22	Disney Channel	Flash
Zouk	1	52	France; United Kingdom	2021	Canal+ Kids	Flash

== See also ==
- 2021 in animation
- 2021 in anime
- List of animated feature films of 2021
