= List of animated feature films of 2021 =

This is a list of animated feature films that were released in 2021.

== List ==
Title	Country	Director	Production company	Animation technique	Notes	Release date	Duration
The Addams Family 2	Canada; United States	Conrad Vernon; Greg Tiernan	Metro-Goldwyn-Mayer; Jackal Group; Glickmania	Computer		October 1, 2021	93 minutes
The Adventures of Qiaohu Magic Island	China; Japan	Shanghai Heyu	Benesse	Computer		July 24, 2021	80 minutes
Agent Backkom: Kings Bear	China	Zhang Yang	Alpha Pictures	Computer		July 23, 2021	95 minutes
Ainbo: Spirit of the Amazon	Peru; Netherlands	Richard Claus; Jose Zelada	Tunche Films; Cool Beans	Computer		February 13, 2021	89 minutes
Alephia 2053	Lebanon; France	Jorj Abou Mhaya	Spring Entertainment	Traditional		March 21, 2021	60 minutes
Alice-Miranda A Royal Christmas Ball	Australia	Jo Boag	SLR Productions	Flash		October 15, 2021	81 minutes
America: The Motion Picture	United States	Matt Thompson	Netflix Animation Studios; Floyd County Productions; Lord Miller Productions; Free Association; Jittery Dog Productions	Traditional; Flash		June 30, 2021	98 minutes
Go! Anpanman: Fluffy Fuwari and the Cloud Country それいけ!アンパンマン ふわふわフワリーと雲の国	Japan	Jun Kawagoe	Anpanman Production Committee; TMS Entertainment	Traditional		June 25, 2021	63 minutes
Archipelago	Canada	Félix Dufour-Laperrière	La Distributrices de Films; Miyu Distribution; L'Embuscade Films	Traditional		February 4, 2021 (IFFR)	72 minutes
Aria the Benedizione	Japan	Junichi Sato (Chief); Takahiro Natori	J.C.Staff	Traditional		December 3, 2021	60 minutes
Aria the Crepuscolo	Japan	Junichi Sato (Chief); Takahiro Natori	J.C.Staff	Traditional		March 5, 2021	60 minutes
Arlo the Alligator Boy	United States	Ryan Crego	Netflix Animation Studios; Titmouse	Traditional; Flash		April 16, 2021	92 minutes
Around the World in 80 Days	France; Belgium	Samuel Tourneux	Cottonwood Media	Computer		August 4, 2021	82 minutes
Back to the Outback	United States	Clare Knight; Harry Cripps	Netflix Animation Studios; Weed Road Pictures; Reel FX Animation Studios	Computer		December 10, 2021	95 minutes
Bamse and the Volcano Island; Bamse och vulkanön	Sweden	Christian Ryltenius	Nordisk Film	Traditional		December 22, 2021	70 minutes
Barbie & Chelsea: The Lost Birthday	United States	Cassandra Mackay	Mattel Entertainment	Computer		April 16, 2021	60 minutes
Barbie: Big City, Big Dreams	United States	Scott Pleydell-Pearce	Mattel Entertainment	Computer		September 1, 2021	60 minutes
Batman: Soul of the Dragon	United States	Sam Liu	Warner Bros. Animation; DC Entertainment	Traditional		January 12, 2021	83 minutes
Batman: The Long Halloween	United States	Chris Palmer	Warner Bros. Animation; DC Entertainment	Traditional		July 27, 2021	Part 1: 85 minutes Part 2; 87 minutes Total: 172 minutes
Belle	Japan	Mamoru Hosoda	Studio Chizu	Traditional		July 15, 2021 (Cannes); July 16, 2021	124 minutes
Bob Cuspe – We Don't Like People	Brazil	César Cabral	Coala Filmes	Stop-motion		September 22, 2021 (Ottawa International Animation festival); November 11, 2021	90 minutes
Bombay Rose	India	Gitanjali Rao	Cinestaan Film Company	Traditional		August 28, 2019 (Venice); March 8, 2021	97 minutes
Boonie Bears: The Wild Life	China	Leon Ding; Shao Heqi	China Film Co., Ltd. Lian Ray Pictures; Maoyan; HG Entertainment; Suniverse; Fantawild Animation; HG Entertainment; Sunac Culture; Lian Ray Pictures	Computer		February 12, 2021	99 minutes
The Boss Baby: Family Business	United States	Tom McGrath	DreamWorks Animation	Computer		July 2, 2021	107 minutes
Bright: Samurai Soul	Japan	Kyōhei Ishiguro	Netflix; Arect	Computer; Traditional		October 12, 2021	80 minutes
Catalina la Catrina: Especial Día de Muertos	Mexico	Edino Israel	Ikartoons Animation	Flash		October 1, 2021	47 minutes
Checkered Ninja 2 Ternet Ninja 2	Denmark	Thorbjørn Christoffersen; Anders Matthesen	A. Film; Pop Up Production; Sudoku ApS	Computer		August 19, 2021	86 minutes
Child of Kamiari Month 神在月のこども	Japan	Takana Shirai (Note: Animation Director (アニメーション監督), not to be confused with 作画監督)	Liden Films	Traditional		October 8, 2021 (Japan); February 8, 2022 (International)	99 minutes
Clifford the Big Red Dog	United States; Canada	Walt Becker	New Republic Pictures; The K Entertainment Company; Scholastic Entertainment	Computer / Live action		August 26, 2021 (CinemaCon); November 10, 2021 (United States)	96 minutes
A Crocodile Who Will Die in 100 Days; 100日後に死ぬワニ	Japan	Shinichiro Ueda	TIA	Traditional		July 9, 2021	62 minutes
Crayon Shin-chan: Shrouded in Mystery! The Flowers of Tenkazu Academy クレヨンしんちゃん 謎メキ！花の天カス学園	Japan	Wataru Takahashi	Shin-Ei Animation	Traditional		July 30, 2021	104 minutes
Cryptozoo	United States	Dash Shaw	Magnolia Pictures	Flash		January 29, 2021 (Sundance); August 20, 2021	95 minutes
Családi legendák	Hungary	Katalin Glaser	Kecskemétfilm	2D	TV movie	August 14, 2021 (Kecskemét Animation Film Festival); June 24, 2022 (M2 TV premiere); September 22, 2022 (Cinema premiere)	65 minutes
Curious George: Cape Ahoy	United States	Doug Murphy	Universal Animation Studios; Imagine Entertainment; Universal 1440 Entertainment	Flash		September 30, 2021	90 minutes
Daisy Quokka: World's Scariest Animal	Australia	Ricard Cussó	Like a Photon Creative	Computer		November 28, 2020 (Children's International Film Festival); February 4, 2021	89 minutes
Dakaichi: Spain Arc	Japan	Naoyuki Tatsuwa	CloverWorks	Traditional		October 9, 2021	78 minutes
Deemo: Memorial Keys; DEEMO サクラノオト -あなたの奏でた音が、今も響く-	Japan	Shūhei Matsushita	Production I.G; Signal.MD	Traditional		October 22, 2021 (Bucheon IAF); February 25, 2022	89 minutes
The Deer King 鹿の王	Japan	Masashi Ando; Masayuki Miyaji	Production I.G	Traditional		June 14, 2021 (Annecy); February 4, 2022	114 minutes
Detective Conan: The Scarlet Bullet 名探偵コナン 緋色の弾丸	Japan	Tomoka Nagaoka	TMS Entertainment	Traditional		April 16, 2021	110 minutes
Diary of a Wimpy Kid	United States; Canada	Swinton O. Scott III	Walt Disney Pictures; Bardel Entertainment	Computer		December 3, 2021	58 minutes
Dinosaur Train: Adventure Island	United States	Craig Bartlett	The Jim Henson Company	Computer		April 12, 2021	85 minutes
Dogtanian and the Three Muskehounds	Spain	Toni García	Apolo Films; Cosmos Maya	Computer		June 25, 2021 (United Kingdom); August 18, 2021 (Spain)	84 minutes
Dragon Princess; Princesse Dragon	France	Anthony Roux; Jean-Jacques Denis	Ankama; France 3 Cinéma; France Télévisions	Traditional		December 15, 2021	70 minutes
Encanto	United States	Byron Howard; Jared Bush	Walt Disney Animation Studios	Computer		November 3, 2021 (El Capitan Theatre); November 24, 2021	102 minutes
Evangelion: 3.0+1.0 Thrice Upon a Time シン・エヴァンゲリオン劇場版𝄇	Japan	Hideaki Anno; Kazuya Tsurumaki; Mahiro Maeda	Studio Khara	Traditional		March 8, 2021	155 minutes
Even Mice Belong in Heaven; Myši patří do nebe	Czech Republic; France; Poland; Slovakia	Jan Bubeníček; Denisa Grimmová	Fresh Films; Les Films du Cygne; Animoon; CinemArt SK; Canal+ Polska; EC1 Lódz - Miasto Kultury	Stop motion		August 21, 2021 (Karlovy Vary International Film Festival); October 7, 2021 (Czech Republic)	80 minutes
Extinct	Canada; United States; China	David Silverman; Raymond S. Persi	Netflix; HB Wink Animation; Huayi Brothers; Tolerable Entertainment; Cinesite; Timeless Films	Computer		February 11, 2021 (Russia); November 19, 2021	84 minutes
Farewell, My Dear Cramer: First Touch さよならフットボール	Japan	Seiki Takuno	Liden Films	Traditional		June 11, 2021	104 minutes
Fate/Grand Order: Final Singularity-Grand Temple of Time: Solomon さよならフットボール	Japan	Toshifumi Akai	CloverWorks	Traditional		July 30, 2021	94 minutes
Fate/kaleid liner Prisma Illya: Licht - The Nameless Girl	Japan	Shin Oonuma	Silver Link	Traditional		August 27, 2021	95 minutes
Felix and the Treasure of Morgäa	Canada	Nicola Lemay	10e Ave	Computer		February 26, 2021 (Montreal International Children's Film Festival)	90 minutes
Flee	United States; United Kingdom; France; Sweden; Norway; Denmark	Jonas Poher Rasmussen	Vice Studios; Left Handed Films; RYOT Films	Traditional		January 28, 2021 (Sundance); December 3, 2021 (United States)	90 minutes
Fortune Favors Lady Nikuko	Japan	Ayumu Watanabe	Studio 4°C	Traditional		June 11, 2021	120 minutes
Gekijōban Argonavis: Ryūsei no Obligato	Japan	Shigeru Morikawa	Sanzigen	Traditional		November 19, 2021	89 minutes
Gintama: The Very Final	Japan	Chizuru Miyawaki	Bandai Namco Pictures	Traditional		January 8, 2021	104 minutes
Girls und Panzer das Finale: Part 3	Japan	Tsutomu Mizushima	Actas	Traditional		March 26, 2021	48 minutes
Goldbeak	China	Dong Long; Nigel W. Tierney	Suzhou Pegasus Liangzi Film; Tierney Corp Productions	Computer		October 1, 2021	94 minutes
Gora Automatikoa	Spain	Esaú Dharma; David Galán Galindo; Pablo Vara	39 Escalones; The Other Film Production	Flash		November 19, 2021	71 minutes
Green Snake 白蛇二：青蛇劫起	China	Amp Wong	Light Chaser Animation Studios; Alibaba Pictures; Tianjin Maoyan Weiying Culture Media; Bilibili	Computer		July 23, 2021	132 minutes
Gulliver Returns	Ukraine	Ilya Maksimov	95 Animation Studio; Gulliver Films	Computer		June 18, 2021 (SIFF); August 19, 2021	90 minutes
Healin' Good Pretty Cure the Movie: GoGo! Big Transformation! The Town of Dreams 映画ヒーリングっど♡プリキュア ゆめのまちでキュン！っとGoGo！大変身！！	Japan	Ryôta Nakamura	Toei Animation	Traditional		March 20, 2021	70 minutes
Hilda and the Mountain King	United States; United Kingdom; Canada	Andy Coyle; Luke Pearson	Netflix; Silvergate Media; Mercury Filmworks; Nobrow Press	Flash		December 30, 2021	85 minutes
The House of the Lost on the Cape 岬のマヨイガ	Japan	Shinya Kawatsura	David Production	Traditional		August 27, 2021	100 minutes
Hula Fulla Dance	Japan	Seiji Mizushima; Shinya Watada	Bandai Namco Pictures	Traditional		December 3, 2021	109 minutes
I Am What I Am	China	Sun Haipeng	Yi Animation	Computer		December 11, 2021 (premium large format); December 17, 2021 (wide release)	104 minutes
Injustice	United States	Matt Peters	Warner Bros. Animation; DC Entertainment	Traditional		October 19, 2021	78 minutes
Inu-Oh	Japan	Masaaki Yuasa	Science SARU	Traditional		September 9, 2021 (Venice); May 28, 2022 (Japan)	98 minutes
The Irregular at Magic High School: Reminiscence Arc	Japan	Risako Yoshida	Eight Bit; Eight Bit Niigata	Traditional		December 31, 2021	71 minutes
The Journey	Saudi Arabia; Japan	Shizuno Kobun	Toei Animation; Manga Productions	Traditional		June 17, 2021 (Saudi Arabia); June 25, 2021 (Japan)	110 minutes
Jujutsu Kaisen 0	Japan	Sunghoo Park	MAPPA	Traditional		December 24, 2021	105 minutes
Justice Society: World War II	United States	Jeff Wamester	Warner Bros. Animation; DC Entertainment	Traditional		April 27, 2021	84 minutes
Khoka Theke Bangabandhu Jatir Pita	Bangladesh	Md. Hanif Siddiqui	Agami Labs	Flash		September 28, 2021	92 minutes
Kin-iro Mosaic: Thank You!!	Japan	Munenori Nawa	Studio Gokumi; AXsiZ	Traditional		August 20, 2021	82 minutes
Knights of Sidonia: Love Woven in the Stars	Japan	Hiroyuki Seshita (chief); Tadahiro Yoshihira	Polygon Pictures	Computer; Traditional		June 4, 2021	110 minutes
Koati	Mexico; United States	Rodrigo Perez-Castro	Upstairs; Timeless Films; Latin We	Traditional		October 15, 2021	92 minutes
Koschey: The Everlasting Story	Russia	Andrey Kolpin	Parovoz Animation Studio	Computer		October 28, 2021	100 minutes
The Kuflis 3 Kuflik és az Akármi	Hungary	Kristóf Jurik	KEDD Animation Studio	Flash		August 12, 2022 (Hungary premiere)	72 minutes
Lamya's Poem	Canada; United States	Alex Kronemer	Unity Productions; PiP Animation Services	Traditional; Flash		June 14, 2021 (Annecy)	89 minutes
Legend of Destruction	Israel; United States	Gidi Dar	Eddie King Films; Lama Films; Memento International; Nakhshon Films; HOT8; Kan 11	Oil-painted; Traditional		July 15, 2021	93 minutes
The Loud House Movie	United States	Dave Needham	Netflix; Nickelodeon Movies	Flash		August 20, 2021	87 minutes
Luca	United States	Enrico Casarosa	Pixar Animation Studios	Computer		June 13, 2021 (Aquarium of Genoa); June 18, 2021; March 22, 2024 (theatrical)	95 minutes
Mad God	United States	Phil Tippett	Shudder; Tippett Studio	Stop-Motion		August 5, 2021 (Locarno); June 16, 2022	83 minutes
Marcel the Shell with Shoes On	United States	Dean Fleischer Camp	Cinereach; You Want I Should LLC. Human Woman Inc. Sunbeam TV & Films; Chiodo Bros. Productions	Stop-Motion / Live action		September 3, 2021 (Telluride); June 24, 2022	90 minutes
Maya the Bee: The Golden Orb	Germany; Australia	Noel Cleary	Buzz Studios; Studio 100 Animation	Computer		January 7, 2021	88 minutes
Mickey and Minnie Wish Upon a Christmas	United States	Broni Likomanov	Disney Television Animation	Computer		December 2, 2021	46 minutes
Mickey's Tale of Two Witches	United States	Jeff Gordon	Disney Television Animation	Computer		October 7, 2021	46 minutes
The Mitchells vs. the Machines	United States	Mike Rianda	Netflix; Sony Pictures Animation; Lord Miller Productions; One Cool Films	Computer		April 23, 2021	114 minutes
Monster Family 2	Germany; United Kingdom	Holger Tappe	Ambient Entertainment; Rothkirch Cartoon Film; Sky Cinema Original Films	Computer		October 15, 2021 (United States); October 22, 2021 (United Kingdom); November 4, 2021 (Germany)	103 minutes
Monster Hunter: Legends of the Guild	United States	Steve Yamamoto	Netflix; Pure Imagination Studios	Computer		August 12, 2021	58 minutes
Moonbound	Austria; Germany	Ali Samadi Ahadi	Brave New Work; Coop99 Filmproduktion; Little Dream Entertainment	Computer		June 24, 2021	84 minutes
Mortal Kombat Legends: Battle of the Realms	United States	Ethan Spaulding	Warner Bros. Animation; NetherRealm Studios	Traditional		August 31, 2021	80 minutes
Mujib Amar Pita	Bangladesh	Sohel Mohammad Rana	Prolancer Studio; BMIT Solutions	Traditional		October 1, 2021	49 minutes
My Hero Academia: World Heroes' Mission 僕のヒーローアカデミア THE MOVIE ワールドヒーローズミッション	Japan	Kenji Nagasaki	Bones	Traditional		August 6, 2021	105 minutes
My Little Pony: A New Generation	United States	Robert Cullen; José Luis Ucha; Mark Fattibene	Netflix; Entertainment One; Boulder Media	Computer		September 24, 2021 (Worldwide exc. China); July 18, 2022 (Sing Along version)	91 minutes
My Sunny Maad	Czech Republic; Slovakia; France	Michaela Pavlátová	Negativ Film; Sacrebleu Productions; BFILM.cz; Alkay Animation; Gao Shan Pictures; Innervision	Traditional		June 14, 2021 (Annecy Festival)	85 minutes
My Sweet Monster	Russia	Viktor Glukhushin; Maksim Volkov	CTB Film Company; Skazka Animation Studio; Cinema Fund; Luminescence	Computer		October 6, 2021 (Netherlands); April 28, 2022 (Russia)	98 minutes
Natsume's Book of Friends: The Waking Rock and the Strange Visitor	Japan	Takahiro Omori	Shuka	Traditional		January 16, 2021	51 minutes
New Gods: Nezha Reborn	China	Zhao Ji	Light Chaser Animation Studios; Alibaba Pictures; Bona Film Group; Bilibili; Pop Mart	Computer		February 12, 2021 (China); April 12, 2021 (Netflix)	116 minutes
The New Little Mermaid: Ocean Girl	China	Ming Si		Computer		April 17, 2021	82 minutes
Night of the Animated Dead	United States	Jason Axinn	Warner Bros. Home Entertainment	Traditional; Flash		September 21, 2021	71 minutes
Octonauts & The Ring of Fire	United Kingdom; Canada	Blair Simmons	Netflix; Silvergate Media; Mainframe Studios	Computer		March 30, 2021	72 minutes
The Ogglies; Die Olchis - Willkommen in Schmuddelfing	Germany; Belgium	Toby Genkel; Jens Møller	WunderWerk; Grid Animation; Verlag Friedrich Oetinger; Leonine Studios; ZDF; ARRI Media	Computer		May 6, 2021 (Limited); July 22, 2021 (Germany)	85 minutes
Panda vs. Aliens	Canada; China	Sean Patrick O'Reilly	Arcana Studio; Yisang Media; Los Angeles-Beijing Studios	Computer		April 9, 2021	80 minutes
Paw Patrol: The Movie	Canada	Cal Brunker	Nickelodeon Movies; Spin Master Entertainment	Computer		August 8, 2021 (Vue Leicester Square); August 20, 2021 (United States)	86 minutes
Peter Rabbit 2: The Runaway	United States; United Kingdom; Australia	Will Gluck	Columbia Pictures; Animal Logic; MRC; 2.0 Entertainment; Olive Bridge Entertainment	Computer / Live action		March 25, 2021 (Australia); May 17, 2021 (United Kingdom); June 11, 2021 (United States)	93 minutes
Pil; Pil	France	Julien Fournet	TAT Productions; SND Groupe M6; France 3 cinéma	Computer		August 11, 2021	89 minutes
Pobaby	China	Chengfeng Zheng	Shanghai Shihuang Animation design co Ltd.	Computer		January 1, 2021	90 minutes
Pompo: The Cinéphile	Japan	Takayuki Hirao	CLAP Animation Studio	Traditional		June 4, 2021; April 29, 2022 (Limited); June 28, 2022 (Digital); July 12, 2022 (Blu-ray/DVD)	90 minutes
Pretty Guardian Sailor Moon Eternal The Movie	Japan	Chiaki Kon	Toei Animation; Studio Deen	Traditional		Part 1: January 8, 2021; Part 2: February 11, 2021	160 minutes (total, 80 minutes per film)
Princess Principal: Crown Handler – Chapter 1	Japan	Masaki Tachibana	Actas	Traditional		February 11, 2021	53 minutes
Princess Principal: Crown Handler – Chapter 2	Japan	Masaki Tachibana	Actas	Traditional		September 23, 2021	56 minutes
Raya and the Last Dragon	United States	Don Hall; Carlos Lopez Estrada	Walt Disney Animation Studios	Computer		March 5, 2021	107 minutes
Riverdance: The Animated Adventure	Ireland; United Kingdom	Dave Rosenbaum; Eamonn Butler	Netflix; Cinesite; Aniventure; River Productions	Computer		May 28, 2021 (United Kingdom); January 14, 2022 (United States)	86 minutes
Rock Dog 2: Rock Around the Park	United States	Mark Baldo	Lionsgate; Splash Entertainment; HB Wink Animation	Computer		June 11, 2021	90 minutes
Ron's Gone Wrong	United Kingdom; United States	Sarah Smith; Jean-Philippe Vine	Locksmith Animation; 20th Century Animation	Computer		October 9, 2021 (65th BFI London Film Festival); October 15, 2021 (United Kingdom); October 22, 2021 (United States)	107 minutes
Rumble	United States	Hamish Grieve	Reel FX Animation Studios; Paramount Animation; New Republic Pictures; WWE Studios; Walden Media	Computer		December 15, 2021	95 minutes
Scooby-Doo! The Sword and the Scoob	United States	Maxwell Atoms; Mel Zwyer; Christina Sotta	Warner Bros. Animation	Traditional		February 23, 2021	76 minutes
Seal Team	South Africa	Greig Cameron; Kane Croudace	Netflix; Triggerfish Animation Studios	Computer		October 13, 2021 (Netherlands); December 31, 2021	98 minutes
Secret Magic Control Agency	Russia	Aleksey Tsitsilin	Netflix; Wizart Animation; CTB Film Company; QED International	Computer		March 18, 2021; March 25, 2021 (United States)	104 minutes
Seitokai Yakuindomo: The Movie 2	Japan	Hiromitsu Kanazawa	GoHands	Traditional		January 1, 2021	80 minutes
The Seven Deadly Sins: Cursed by Light 劇場版 七つの大罪 光に呪われし者たち	Japan	Takayuki Hamana	Studio Deen	Traditional		July 2, 2021	79 minutes
Shika no Ō	Japan	Masashi Ando; Masayuki Miyaji	Production I.G	Traditional		June 14, 2021 (Annecy); September 10, 2021 (Japan)	120 minutes
Sing 2	United States	Garth Jennings	Illumination	Computer		November 14, 2021 (AFI Fest); December 22, 2021	110 minutes
Sing a Bit of Harmony アイの歌声を聴かせて	Japan	Yasuhiro Yoshiura	J.C.Staff	Traditional		October 29, 2021	108 minutes
Space Battleship Yamato 2205: A New Journey Part 1: Take Off	Japan	Kenji Yasuda	Satelight; Staple Entertainment	Traditional		October 8, 2021	97 minutes
The "Space Battleship Yamato" Era: The Choice in 2202	Japan	Atsushi Sato	Studio Mother	Traditional		June 11, 2021	120 minutes
Space Jam: A New Legacy	United States	Malcolm D. Lee	Warner Bros. Pictures; Warner Animation Group; SpringHill Company	Traditional; Computer; Live action		July 12, 2021 (Los Angeles); July 16, 2021 (United States)	115 minutes
The Spine of Night	United States	Philip Gelatt; Morgan David King	Gorgonaut Studio	Traditional		March 18, 2021 (SXSW); October 29, 2021 (United States)	93 minutes
Spirit Untamed	United States	Elaine Bogan; Ennio Torresan	DreamWorks Animation	Computer		June 4, 2021	85 minutes
Straight Outta Nowhere: Scooby-Doo! Meets Courage the Cowardly Dog	United States	Cecilia Aranovich	Warner Bros. Animation	Traditional		September 14, 2021	78 minutes
Stress Zero	South Korea	Daehee Lee	302 Planet; Lee Dae-hee Animation Studio	Computer		February 3, 2021	95 minutes
Summer Ghost サマーゴースト	Japan	Loundraw	Flat Studio; Flagship Line	Traditional		November 12, 2021	40 minutes
The Summit of the Gods	France	Patrick Imbert	Folivari	Traditional		July 15, 2021 (Cannes Film Festival); September 22, 2021	90 minutes
Sword Art Online Progressive: Aria of a Starless Night	Japan	Ayako Kawano	A-1 Pictures	Traditional		October 30, 2021	97 minutes
Teen Titans Go! See Space Jam	United States	Peter Rida Michail	Warner Bros. Animation	Flash		June 20, 2021	83 minutes
Tokyo 7th Sisters	Japan	Takayuki Kitagawa	LandQ Studios	Traditional		February 26, 2021	77 minutes
Tom & Jerry	United States	Tim Story	Warner Bros. Pictures; Warner Animation Group; Turner Entertainment	Computer / Live action		February 26, 2021	101 minutes
Trollhunters: Rise of the Titans	United States	Johane Matte; Francisco Ruiz Velasco; Andrew Schmidt	Netflix; DreamWorks Animation Television; Double Dare You Productions	Computer		July 21, 2021	106 minutes
Tropical-Rouge! Pretty Cure the Movie: The Snow Princess and the Miraculous Ring! 映画 トロピカル～ジュ！プリキュア 雪のプリンセスと奇跡の指輪！	Japan	Junji Shimizu	Toei Animation	Traditional		October 23, 2021	70 minutes
Un rescate de huevitos	Mexico	Gabriel Riva Palacio Alatriste; Rodolfo Riva Palacio Alatriste	Huevocartoon Producciones	Computer		August 12, 2021	89 minutes
Valentina	Spain	Chelo Loureiro	Abano Producións; Antaruxa; El Gatoverde Producciones; Sparkle animation	Computer		December 10, 2021	65 minutes
Vivo	United States	Kirk DeMicco; Brandon Jeffords	Netflix; Sony Pictures Animation; One Cool Films; Laurence Mark Productions	Computer		August 6, 2021	95 minutes
Where Is Anne Frank	Belgium; Luxembourg; France; Netherlands; Israel	Ari Folman	Purple Whale Films; Walking the Dog; Samsa Film; Bridgit Folman Film Gang; Submarine Amsterdam; Le Pacte; Doghouse Films; Magellan Films	Traditional		July 9, 2021 (Cannes); December 8, 2021 (France); December 15, 2021 (Belgium); March 16, 2022 (Luxembourg); March 31, 2022 (Netherlands)	99 minutes
Wings 2 От винта 2 3D	Russia; Armenia	Vage Sargsyan	Paradiz Prodakshnz; Touch FX Animation Studio	Computer		April 15, 2021	83 minutes
Wish Dragon	United States	Chris Appelhans	Netflix; Sony Pictures Animation; Base FX; Beijing Sparkle Roll Media Corporation; Flagship Entertainment Group; Boss Collaboration; Tencent Pictures; Cultural Investment Holdings	Computer		January 15, 2021 (China); June 11, 2021	98 minutes
The Witcher: Nightmare of the Wolf	South Korea; United States; Poland	Kwang Il Han	Netflix; Studio Mir; Little Schmidt Productions; Platige Image; Hivemind	Traditional		August 23, 2021	83 minutes

== Highest-grossing animated films ==
The following is a list of the 10 highest-grossing animated feature films first released in 2021.

Rank	Title	Distributor	Worldwide gross	Ref
1	Sing 2	Universal Pictures	$408,398,852	
2	Encanto	Walt Disney Pictures	$256,786,742	
3	Jujutsu Kaisen 0	Toho	$196,436,179	
4	The Boss Baby: Family Business (Note: Box office numbers do not include the revenue from Universal's simultaneous release of the film on Peacock.)	Universal Pictures	$146,745,280	
5	Paw Patrol: The Movie	Paramount Pictures	$144,327,371	
6	Raya and the Last Dragon (Note: Box office numbers do not include the revenue from Disney's simultaneous release of the film on Disney+ with Premier Access.)	Walt Disney Pictures	$130,423,032	
7	The Addams Family 2	United Artists Releasing/MGM	$119,815,153	
8	Boonie Bears: The Wild Life	Huaqiang Fangte Pictures	$97,200,000	
9	Detective Conan: The Scarlet Bullet	Toho	$95,659,979	
10	Evangelion: 3.0+1.0 Thrice Upon a Time	Toho	$92,246,218	

== See also ==
- List of animated television series of 2021
