= Alephia 2053 =

- Official poster
- Directed by: Jorj Abou Mhaya
- Written by: Bassem Breish
- Produced by: Rabi' Sweidan, Marwan Harb and Jules Kassas
- Music by: Karim Khneisser
- Production company: Spring Entertainment
- Release date: 21 March 2021
- Running time: 60 minutes
- Country: Lebanon
- Language: Arabic

Alephia 2053 is a 2021 Arabic-language animated feature set in a desaturated future Arab world ruled by a despotic dictator.

== Release and reception ==
Depicting a dystopian future in which a group of activists overthrows an oppressive regime. The film was released on YouTube on 22 March 2021. L'Orient-Le Jour described it as the first fictional animated feature film for adults in Arabic. Euronews considered it as a small revolution in Arab cinema and animation.

== Production ==
The animated feature was created by a Lebanese company, Spring Entertainment, with partial backing from French animation studio Malil'Art. The soundtrack and most of its graphical animation was done in Lebanon. The film was produced by Rabi' Sweidan, Marwan Harb and Jules Kassas and illustrated and directed by Jorj Abou Mhaya. According to Sweidan, the repression, resistance and revolution portrayed in Alephia does not depict the history of a single country but instead draws from familiar social conditions around the world. Multiple sources described the events of the feature as being similar to the events of the 2011 Arab Spring.

== Reception ==
After the release in March 2021, the film quickly went viral on YouTube and other streaming services. As of 29 April, the feature had accrued over 8 million views on YouTube.
