= Headspace Guide to Sleep =

2021 animated docuseries

- Promotional poster
- Genre: Docu-series
- Directed by: Gabriel de Bruin; Katy Wang
- Country of origin: United States
- Original language: English
- No. of seasons: 1
- No. of episodes: 7

Production
- Editor: Alex Ricciardi
- Running time: 15-20 minutes
- Production company: Headspace Studios

Original release
- Network: Netflix
- Release: April 28, 2021

Headspace Guide to Sleep is a 2021 animated docuseries created for Netflix in collaboration with Headspace. The seven-part series explores the science behind getting healthy sleep and provides advice on how to do so. Each episode ends with a guided relaxation to help prepare you for sleep. It was released on April 28, 2021.
