= Deer Squad =

Chinese name
- Simplified Chinese: 无敌鹿战队
- Traditional Chinese: 無敵鹿戰隊
- Literal meaning: Invincible Deer Team
Transcriptions
Standard Mandarin
- Hanyu Pinyin: Wúdí Lù Zhànduì
- Genre: Preschool; Science fiction Adventure; Fantasy
- Directed by: Zhigang Wang; Dexiang Lu
- Presented by: Yu Gong
- Theme music composer: Score Draw Music
- Composer: Score Draw Music
- Countries of origin: China; United Kingdom
- Original languages: Mandarin; English
- No. of seasons: 4
- No. of episodes: 80

Production
- Producers: Yiming Qie; Fang Xue; Dan Xiang; Eva Lam; Chenfei Zhu (S2-3)
- Running time: 12 minutes
- Production company: Beijing iQIYI Science & Technology Co., Ltd.

Original release
- Network: iQIYI; Nickelodeon (international); CCTV-14
- Release: July 15, 2020 – present

Deer Squad (Chinese: 无敌鹿战队; pinyin: Wúdí Lù Zhànduì) is a Chinese-British animated children's television series produced by iQIYI in Beijing. The series follows a group of four deer named Kai, Lola, Rammy, and Bobbi, who all carry elemental superpowers (called "Planet Powers") that are used to protect the animals of Central Forest and the humans of Platinum City from any danger coming their way.

Before the series went into production, it started out as a series of shorts titled "Deer Run", which premiered on February 2017 on iQIYI and CCTV-14 in 2019. The series was fully released on iQIYI's video platform on July 15, 2020. In the United States, the series premiered on January 25, 2021 on Nickelodeon.

The second season was released on January 14, 2022.

On September 20, 2022, iQIYI announced that a third season would be released in the second quarter of 2023. The third season released on August 4, 2023.

On May 7, 2025, it was confirmed the season would release around November. The fourth season was released on November 7, 2025.

According to Xiaoxuan Yang, vice president of iQIYI, Deer Squad ranked in the top five children's shows launched on the iQIYI service in 2020.

== Premise ==
Kai, Lola, Rammy, and Bobbi are anthropomorphic four deer friends who reside in a boat-shaped home in the forest. The forest where their home is also has a park where people from a nearby city hang out. Whenever there is trouble in the forest or city, the deer friends, when within proximity of each other, can go into superhero mode, and use their powers to save the day.

== Characters ==
The character designs from the earlier short series (left two images) vs. the full show (right).

=== Deer Squad members ===
The Deer Squad is a group of deer that possess "Planet Powers", elemental-themed superpowers based on the five Chinese elements.

- Kai (voiced by Brody Allen (season 1), Sascha Yurchak (seasons 2-3), and Charlie Egerton (season 4-present) in English) is a yellow deer who is the leader of the Deer Squad and the group's tech wizard. He carries the planet power of water. For the first three seasons, he drove a hovercraft with a rat-like appearance called the "Rat Cart".
- Lola (voiced by Juliet Rusche (season 1–2), Raeleigh Jett (season 3), and Sabrina Erin (season 4-present) in English) is a magenta deer who loves to take care of plants and animals. She carries the planet power of wood, which she uses on anything. For the first three seasons, she had a car that can fly called the "Rocket Rabbit".
- Rammy (voiced by Holden Thomas (season 1–2), Lincoln Kipp (season 3), and Jacob Davidov (season 4-present) in English) is a big red deer who likes to stay active and has an appetite for food. He carries the planet powers of the sun. For the first three seasons, he had a race car called the "Colt Bolt", which was able to convert into a robotic horse that leaps high.
- Bobbi (voiced by Connor Elias Andrade (season 1–3) and Matthew Harmantas (season 4-present) in English) is a small green deer who has the ability to understand babbling animals and has a talent of baking desserts. He carries the planet powers of earth. For the first three seasons, he had a jeep with an ox-like appearance called the "Ox Roader".
- Jade (voiced by Azuri-Hardy Jones in English) is a light blue deer introduced in season 2 as the newest member of the team. She lives in a crystal caverns, where she keeps them safe from any danger and she also loves to make music. She carries the planet powers of crystal and drives a drill cart with a crystal driller called the "Diamond Dragster".
- Wufu (voiced by Boe Smith in English) is a purple-and-yellow butterfly introduced in season 2. She is Jade's companion who doesn't talk, but can whisper to Jade's ear so she can understand her.

=== Recurring ===
- Sir Steel (voiced by Doug Erholtz in English) is a conceited, wealthy entrepreneur who comes up with various plans either for profit or to simply provide himself with convenience even if it means causing problems in the city or wilderness which he does not seem to mind or realize. Though not entirely bald (he has a small hook of hair at the very top), Sir Steel wears a wig which is seen coming off sometimes.
- Professor Scratch (voiced by Julie Maddalena Kliewer in English) is Sir Steel's personal scientist who invents most of the gadgets in Steel Tower.
- Muffin is Sir Steel's pet poodle. Sir Steel is quite protective of her.
- Ian (voiced by Mr. Lawrence (season 1–3) and Dave McRae (season 4–present) in English) is a white duck who is a friend of the Deer Squad. He likes keeping the park in order, and sometimes dispatches the Deer Squad with his tuba when he notices trouble. He also has ducklings to care for.
- Daniel (voiced by Jayden Epifanio in English) is one of Ian's four ducklings. In season 2, he starts to speak more, and is also a member of the Forest Squad, formed by Binky.
- Tina (voiced by Samantha Hahn in English) is a bright green turtle who is also a friend of the Deer Squad. She has three children.
- Binky (voiced by Lincoln Bodin in English) is one of Tina's hatchlings. In season 2, he starts to speak more, and is the leader of the Forest Squad which was formed in the episode, "Tiny Heroes".
- Mimi (voiced by Araceli Prasarttongosoth in English) is a grey kitten who was introduced in season 2. She is a member of the Forest Squad.
- Laura (voiced by Riley King in English) is a brown bunny who was introduced in season 2. She is a member of the Forest Squad.
- Fifi and Sasha La Plume (both voiced by Andie Mechanic in English) are two swans.
- Ricardo (voiced by Jaiden Cannatelli in English) is a squirrel with a high-pitched voice who likes to play pranks. He has an affinity with his tail which he calls "Ramona".
- Catherine (voiced by Gabby Clarke in English) is a young and heartfelt-looking female crocodile who resides in the sewers under the forest. In season 3, she gains a voice and talks in full sentences.
- Stu and Safia (voiced by Oliver Brown and Morgan Young in English) are Sir Steel's niece and nephew introduced in season 2. Whenever they're around, they sometimes like to have fun or cause trouble.
- Lady Fluffpot (voiced by Elizabeth Simmons in English) is a wealthy aristocrat who was introduced in season 2. She loves jewelry and is sometimes critical of nature, and is sometimes accompanied by Sir Steel in his activities or schemes.
- Bot-Ler (voiced by Frank Todaro in English) is Lady Fluffpot's robotic butler.
- Adventure Alex (voiced by Daniel Amerman in English) is Lady Fluffpot's cousin introduced in season 3. He is a traveler who explores Sparkle Island.
- Captain Chomp (voiced by Caroline Kinley in English) is a female dinosaur who was introduced in season 3. She is a space traveler who collects stuff from various planets around space, and occasionally participates in the activities the deer do in some episodes.
- Kenny (voiced by Brick Willis in English) is a male mammoth who was introduced in season 3. He is Captain Chomp's co-pilot.
- Trickalien (voiced by Vargus Mason (season 3) and Dave McRae (season 4–present) in English) is a sneaky alien who was introduced in season 3. He likes filming videos with his camera antenna to show them to his family.

=== Villains ===
- Baron Bite (voiced by Anthony Botelho in English) is the main antagonist of the fourth season. He is a baron dinosaur-like alien who desires to become supreme leader and freeze the entire world. He has a robotic arm, in which he calls his "ice gauntlet".
- Chitter (voiced by Emily Cooper in English) is one of Baron's two sidekicks that work alongside him. She is a violet monkey with two bat wings.
- Snowball (voiced by Dean Willis in English) is one of Baron's two sidekicks that work alongside him. He is a sabertooth tiger that likes to have fun.

== Episodes ==
=== Series overview ===
Season	Segments	Episodes	Originally released	
Season	Segments	Episodes	First released	Last released
1	40	20	July 15, 2020	November 6, 2020
2	40	20	January 14, 2022	July 28, 2022
3	40	20	August 4, 2023	October 27, 2023
4	40	20	November 7, 2025	June 11, 2026

=== Season 1 (2020) ===
No. overall	No. in season	Title	Written by	Original release date	Original airdate (English)	US viewers (millions)
Part 1
1	1	"Goodnight Central Forest"	Allan Plenderleith & Alex Collier	July 15, 2020	January 25, 2021	0.30
1	1	"Steelzilla"	Allan Plenderleith	July 15, 2020	January 25, 2021	0.30
Sir Steel sends giant sunglasses to block the sun from shining in the city so he can stay in bed for as long as he wants. Fed up of being overlooked because of the heroes' popularity, Sir Steel goes into the streets to parade a large balloon of himself.
2	2	"Save the Bees"	Allan Plenderleith & Adam Long	July 15, 2020	January 26, 2021	0.21
2	2	"Duck Dilemma"	Allan Plenderleith & Peter Hynes	July 15, 2020	January 26, 2021	0.21
The Deer Squad rescues a swarm of bees who are being kept in Sir Steel's building to make nectar. Kai builds a robot duck to lead a group of ducklings. But when Lola accidentally showers water on it, the robot duck goes wonky and starts corrupting various devices in the city.
3	3	"Catfish Capers"	Allan Plenderleith & Peter Hynes	July 15, 2020	January 27, 2021	0.23
3	3	"Bubble Debacle"	Allan Plenderleith & Lucy Heavens	July 15, 2020	January 27, 2021	0.23
Sir Steel aims to take the huge catfish from the lake in the forest to put in his aquarium. The Deer Squad would not allow the fish to be taken because it is believed that its absence would greatly affect the forest. To clean his dog and even the forest, Sir Steel puts out a bubble machine which scares and later carries away the creatures.
4	4	"Kai Express"	Allan Plenderleith & Ian Carney	July 15, 2020	January 28, 2021	0.26
4	4	"Ducknado"	Allan Plenderleith & Adam Long	July 15, 2020	January 28, 2021	0.26
Kai links his vehicle with those of the other Deer Squad members to carry his animal friends across the woods. Sir Steel tries to showcase a high-tech hairdryer, but his operating mistake creates a tornado with ducks that causes mayhem in the city and forest.
5	5	"Donut Panic"	Allan Plenderleith	July 15, 2020	January 29, 2021	0.39
5	5	"I Scream"	Allan Plenderleith & Lucy Heavens	July 15, 2020	January 29, 2021	0.39
Because the woods tourists are more interested in donuts, Sir Steel uses a ray gun to conjure giant rolling donuts which, however, scare them away. Kai builds an ice cream dispenser to compensate for eating Lola's ice cream earlier, and goes on to serve the woods tourists.
6	6	"Deep Blue Boo Boo"	Allan Plenderleith & Andrew Burrell	July 15, 2020	February 1, 2021	0.24
6	6	"Stuck Together"	Allan Plenderleith	July 15, 2020	February 1, 2021	0.24
Sir Steel disposes gel plastic by dumping it in the lake. The plastic sticks onto various things, including the giant fish. Sir Steel gets his hand covered in Bobbi's toffee, and gets stuck to Lola. Muffin gets into his robot, and causes trouble in the city.
7	7	"Meteor Mayhem"	Allan Plenderleith & Peter Hynes	July 15, 2020	February 2, 2021	0.29
7	7	"Dance of Destruction"	Allan Plenderleith & Howard Read	July 15, 2020	February 2, 2021	0.29
A meteor is heading towards the city. The attention-hungry Sir Steel uses this as an opportunity to be a hero by attempting to stop it. After finishing second in a dance competition last year, Rammy practices and hopes he would win it this time.
8	8	"Fan Club"	Allan Plenderleith & Ian Carney	July 15, 2020	February 3, 2021	0.21
8	8	"Speeding Steel"	Allan Plenderleith	July 15, 2020	February 3, 2021	0.21
Kai saves three young turtles from certain trouble, and they become his admirers. The turtles' cheering leads Kai to believe he can do anything alone. Because of his low stamina for even a short sprint, Sir Steel decides to use high-tech hitops at the city's marathon despite its illegality.
9	9	"Switcheroo"	Allan Plenderleith & Andrew Burrell	July 15, 2020	February 4, 2021	0.23
9	9	"Protect the Egg"	Allan Plenderleith	July 15, 2020	February 4, 2021	0.23
Sir Steel, using a special gadget, attempts to take the Deer Squad's powers and apply them to himself, but, by mistake, switches his personality with that of a frog instead. Professor Scratch hides various chocolate eggs in the park as part of Sir Steel's personal egg hunt, but this results in the entire place being infested with ants.
10	10	"Steel in Space"	Allan Plenderleith & Howard Read	July 15, 2020	February 5, 2021	0.27
10	10	"That's Magic"	Allan Plenderleith	July 15, 2020	February 5, 2021	0.27
Sir Steel pushes a button which turns his building into a rocket that ascends to space. Professor Scratch poses as a magician, and wins the audience away from Rammy who is performing a ball and dance act. A very jealous Rammy snoops onto the professor's equipment, and accidentally unleashes multiple mischievous rabbits.
Part 2
11	11	"Double Trouble"	Allan Plenderleith & Peter Hynes	November 6, 2020	February 8, 2021	0.17
11	11	"Box Not So Clever"	Allan Plenderleith & Howard Read	November 6, 2020	February 8, 2021	0.17
Sir Steel disguises his robots as the Deer Squad, and makes them a nuisance in society to prevent the title characters from winning the Citizen of Year award, and boost his chances of winning it. Sir Steel's packaging device gets out of control, and starts putting anything and anyone in boxes.
12	12	"Sky Art"	Allan Plenderleith & Lucy Heavens	November 6, 2020	February 10, 2021	0.30
12	12	"The Great Race"	Allan Plenderleith & Adam Long	November 6, 2020	February 10, 2021	0.30
Lola makes a multi-colored cloud in the sky as a work of art. But Sir Steel wants to get rid of the cloud because he feels it is overshadowing his hat-giving charity. The Deer Squad decide to race each other in their vehicles through the forest. Sir Steel, in an innovative car, also gets into the race.
13	13	"Doctor Steel Little"	Allan Plenderleith	November 6, 2020	February 12, 2021	0.28
13	13	"Astonished and Amazed"	Allan Plenderleith & Lucy Heavens	November 6, 2020	February 12, 2021	0.28
Sir Steel has a special microphone that converts generic animal sounds into human language. This catches the attention of some animals, including a crocodile who would not stop following him. To come up with an entry at a plant contest, Sir Steels sows a laboratory-made seed in the forest which grows into a large maze, trapping various animals, including the Deer Squad.
14	14	"Attack of the Drones"	Allan Plenderleith	November 6, 2020	February 16, 2021	0.22
14	14	"Slime Time"	Allan Plenderleith & Ian Carney	November 6, 2020	February 16, 2021	0.22
Sir Steel sends some drones to make deliveries, but they get corrupted after being expose to rain, and start pestering the city's bystanders. Professor Scratch unveils a machine to make plastic slime for Sir Steel's personal enjoyment. Steel decides to operate the device on his own, but does so incorrectly, that slime starts raining in the city.
15	15	"Captain Steel"	Allan Plenderleith & Peter Hynes	November 6, 2020	February 18, 2021	0.20
15	15	"Wash Out"	Allan Plenderleith & Alex Collier	November 6, 2020	February 18, 2021	0.20
While most of the Deer Squad are sick, Sir Steel tries to be a hero by staging various troubles in the city and park. Sir Steel siphons all the water from the lake to fill his water park.
16	16	"Gravity Calamity"	Allan Plenderleith	November 6, 2020	May 24, 2021	0.35
16	16	"Ball of Chaos"	Allan Plenderleith	November 6, 2020	May 24, 2021	0.35
Ricardo steals Sir Steel's anti-gravity gun, and uses it to make objects, people, and animals float in the air. Professor Scratch comes up with a bouncy ball that does not stop bouncing, but Sir Steel's carelessness causes it to bounce around and be a nuisance in the city.
17	17	"Lola's Air Display"	Allan Plenderleith	November 6, 2020	May 26, 2021	0.23
17	17	"Down the Sewers"	Allan Plenderleith	November 6, 2020	May 26, 2021	0.23
Lola looks to put up a show at the park in her flying car, but Sir Steel, who is in a high-tech jet, aims to steal the limelight. When Sir Steel's dog's ball goes missing in the sewers, Bobbi must face his fear of the dark.
18	18	"Small is Smashing"	Allan Plenderleith & Howard Read	November 6, 2020	TBA	N/A
18	18	"Pine Cone Power Up"	Allan Plenderleith & Adam Long	November 6, 2020	TBA	N/A
19	19	"Steel Antlers"	Allan Plenderleith & Howard Read	November 6, 2020	TBA	N/A
19	19	"Berry Bad"	Allan Plenderleith & Lucy Heavens	November 6, 2020	TBA	N/A
20	20	"Turnip for the Books"	Allan Plenderleith & Alex Collier	November 6, 2020	TBA	N/A
20	20	"Magnet Maelstrom"	Allan Plenderleith & Howard Read	November 6, 2020	TBA	N/A

=== Season 2 (2022) ===
No. overall	No. in season	Title	Written by	Original release date	Original airdate (English)	US viewers (millions)
Part 1
21	1	"Over the Rainbow"	Allan Plenderleith	January 14, 2022	TBA	N/A
21	1	"We're Toast"	Allan Plenderleith & Lisa Akhurst	January 14, 2022	TBA	N/A
22	2	"Muffin in Space"	Allan Plenderleith	January 14, 2022	TBA	N/A
22	2	"Fizzy Frenzy"	Allan Plenderleith & Adam Long	January 14, 2022	TBA	N/A
23	3	"Were Wig on the Loose"	Allan Plenderleith & Sam Barlow	January 14, 2022	TBA	N/A
23	3	"Lights Camera Action"	Allan Plenderleith	January 14, 2022	TBA	N/A
24	4	"Raining Teddies"	Allan Plenderleith & Adam Long	January 14, 2022	TBA	N/A
24	4	"Party People"	Allan Plenderleith & Lucy Heavens	January 14, 2022	TBA	N/A
25	5	"The Wig of Power"	Allan Plenderleith & Howard Read	January 14, 2022	TBA	N/A
25	5	"The Duck Who Parped Wolf"	Allan Plenderleith & Howard Read	January 14, 2022	TBA	N/A
26	6	"Satellite Flight"	Allan Plenderleith	January 14, 2022	TBA	N/A
26	6	"Diamond Geezer"	Allan Plenderleith & Lisa Akhurst	January 14, 2022	TBA	N/A
27	7	"Jump Up and Get Down"	Allan Plenderleith & Lucy Heavens	January 14, 2022	TBA	N/A
27	7	"What's Up Lola"	Allan Plenderleith & Adam Redfern	January 14, 2022	TBA	N/A
28	8	"Crystal Catastrophe"	Allan Plenderleith & Ian Carney	January 14, 2022	TBA	N/A
28	8	"Good Steel Bad Steel"	Allan Plenderleith	January 14, 2022	TBA	N/A
29	9	"Lady Monkey Mech"	Allan Plenderleith & Adam Redfern	January 14, 2022	TBA	N/A
29	9	"Critter Care Calamity"	Allan Plenderleith & Howard Read	January 14, 2022	TBA	N/A
30	10	"The Supersized Sunflower"	Allan Plenderleith & Adam Redfern	January 14, 2022	TBA	N/A
30	10	"Moontaker"	Allan Plenderleith & Lisa Akhurst	January 14, 2022	TBA	N/A
Part 2
31	11	"Every Cloud"	Allan Plenderleith & Howard Read	July 28, 2022	TBA	N/A
31	11	"Rainbow Comet Rush"	Allan Plenderleith & Adam Long	July 28, 2022	TBA	N/A
32	12	"The Big Bug Hunt"	Allan Plenderleith	July 28, 2022	TBA	N/A
32	12	"Deer Ball"	Allan Plenderleith & Howard Read	July 28, 2022	TBA	N/A
33	13	"Game Over"	Allan Plenderleith & Ian Carney	July 28, 2022	TBA	N/A
33	13	"Forever Young"	Allan Plenderleith & Lisa Akhurst	July 28, 2022	TBA	N/A
34	14	"Tiny Heroes"	Allan Plenderleith	July 28, 2022	TBA	N/A
34	14	"Big Face in Space"	Allan Plenderleith & Howard Read	July 28, 2022	TBA	N/A
35	15	"Treasure Park"	Allan Plenderleith	July 28, 2022	TBA	N/A
35	15	"Baddy Long Legs"	Allan Plenderleith & Howard Read	July 28, 2022	TBA	N/A
36	16	"Wheel of Steel"	Allan Plenderleith & Ian Carney	July 28, 2022	TBA	N/A
36	16	"Bobbi's Bongos"	Allan Plenderleith & Adam Long	July 28, 2022	TBA	N/A
37	17	"Fountain Fiasco"	Allan Plenderleith & Adam Redfern	July 28, 2022	TBA	N/A
37	17	"Night of the Disco Lights"	Allan Plenderleith	July 28, 2022	TBA	N/A
38	18	"Cosmic Circus"	Allan Plenderleith & Adam Long	July 28, 2022	TBA	N/A
38	18	"A Hole Lot of Trouble"	Allan Plenderleith & Howard Read	July 28, 2022	TBA	N/A
39	19	"Den Build Disaster"	Allan Plenderleith & Adam Redfern	July 28, 2022	TBA	N/A
39	19	"Winter Lights"	Allan Plenderleith	July 28, 2022	TBA	N/A
40	20	"Dinobot"	Allan Plenderleith	July 28, 2022	TBA	N/A
40	20	"Forest Squad in Space"	Allan Plenderleith & Ian Carney	July 28, 2022	TBA	N/A

=== Season 3 (2023) ===
No. overall	No. in season	Title	Written by	Original release date	Original airdate (English)	US viewers (millions)
Part 1
41	1	"Nubble Trouble"	Allan Plenderleith & Ian Carney	August 4, 2023	TBA	N/A
41	1	"Bouncing Boulders"	Allan Plenderleith & Adam Long	August 4, 2023	TBA	N/A
42	2	"The Space Station Mystery"	Allan Plenderleith	August 4, 2023	TBA	N/A
42	2	"Crystal Cracks"	Allan Plenderleith	August 4, 2023	TBA	N/A
43	3	"Runaway Hamster Ball"	Allan Plenderleith & Howard Read	August 4, 2023	TBA	N/A
43	3	"The Perfectinator"	Allan Plenderleith	August 4, 2023	TBA	N/A
44	4	"The Secret Island"	Allan Plenderleith	August 4, 2023	TBA	N/A
44	4	"Astrobot"	Allan Plenderleith & Ian Carney	August 4, 2023	TBA	N/A
45	5	"The Crystal of Strength"	Allan Plenderleith, Lisa Akhurst, & Marc Seal	August 4, 2023	TBA	N/A
45	5	"Clamity"	Allan Plenderleith & Tasha Dhanraj	August 4, 2023	TBA	N/A
46	6	"Baby Steel"	Allan Plenderleith & Adam Long	August 4, 2023	TBA	N/A
46	6	"Joke's on You"	Allan Plenderleith & Chio Su Ping	August 4, 2023	TBA	N/A
47	7	"Deep Dive"	Allan Plenderleith, Lisa Akhurst, & Marc Seal	August 4, 2023	TBA	N/A
47	7	"Firefruit Surprise"	Allan Plenderleith	August 4, 2023	TBA	N/A
48	8	"The Name's Chomp"	Allan Plenderleith	August 4, 2023	TBA	N/A
48	8	"Cactus-trophe"	Allan Plenderleith & Howard Read	August 4, 2023	TBA	N/A
49	9	"Sandcastle Calamity"	Allan Plenderleith	August 4, 2023	TBA	N/A
49	9	"Owl-ert"	Allan Plenderleith & Howard Read	August 4, 2023	TBA	N/A
50	10	"Going Off with a Bang"	Allan Plenderleith & Howard Read	August 4, 2023	TBA	N/A
50	10	"Talent for Trouble"	Allan Plenderleith & Chio Su Ping	August 4, 2023	TBA	N/A
Part 2
51	11	"Treasure Ship"	Allan Plenderleith & Becky Overton	October 27, 2023	TBA	N/A
51	11	"Sleepover on Sparkle Island"	Allan Plenderleith & Adam Long	October 27, 2023	TBA	N/A
52	12	"Bats All Folks"	Allan Plenderleith & Tasha Dhanraj	October 27, 2023	TBA	N/A
52	12	"The Handbag of Doom"	Allan Plenderleith	October 27, 2023	TBA	N/A
53	13	"Penguin Panic"	Allan Plenderleith	October 27, 2023	TBA	N/A
53	13	"Cave Conundrum"	Allan Plenderleith, Becky Overton, & Naomi Smith	October 27, 2023	TBA	N/A
54	14	"Adventure Camp"	Allan Plenderleith	October 27, 2023	TBA	N/A
54	14	"Colour Drain"	Allan Plenderleith & Darren Jones	October 27, 2023	TBA	N/A
55	15	"Inventor's Block"	Allan Plenderleith & Howard Read	October 27, 2023	TBA	N/A
55	15	"A Sticky Situation"	Allan Plenderleith & Chio Su Ping	October 27, 2023	TBA	N/A
56	16	"Doors Galore"	Allan Plenderleith & Chio Su Ping	October 27, 2023	TBA	N/A
56	16	"No Rules Day"	Allan Plenderleith & Adam Long	October 27, 2023	TBA	N/A
57	17	"Catherine and the Slime Crocs"	Allan Plenderleith	October 27, 2023	TBA	N/A
57	17	"Forest Flyer"	Allan Plenderleith & Ian Carney	October 27, 2023	TBA	N/A
58	18	"Whale of a Time"	Allan Plenderleith & Howard Read	October 27, 2023	TBA	N/A
58	18	"The Ice Troll"	Allan Plenderleith & Ian Carney	October 27, 2023	TBA	N/A
59	19	"Monster Mix-up"	Allan Plenderleith & Chio Su Ping	October 27, 2023	TBA	N/A
59	19	"Space Station Staycation"	Allan Plenderleith & Howard Read	October 27, 2023	TBA	N/A
60	20	"Hide and Sea"	Allan Plenderleith & Ian Carney	October 27, 2023	TBA	N/A
60	20	"Mountain of Fun"	Allan Plenderleith & Adam Long	October 27, 2023	TBA	N/A

=== Season 4 (2025-26) ===
No. overall	No. in season	Title	Written by	Original release date	Original airdate (English)	US viewers (millions)
Part 1
61	1	"Out of the Ice"	Allan Plenderleith	November 7, 2025	October 19, 2026 (Nick Jr. Channel)	N/A
62	2	"Buns in Space"	Allan Plenderleith & Amelia Fergusson	November 7, 2025	October 20, 2026 (Nick Jr. Channel)	N/A
62	2	"Scratch and Sniff"	Allan Plenderleith & Elan Thaler Hickey	November 7, 2025	October 21, 2026 (Nick Jr. Channel)	N/A
63	3	"Penguin Peril"	Allan Plenderleith & Adam Long	November 7, 2025	October 22, 2026 (Nick Jr. Channel)	N/A
63	3	"Fix It Fair"	Allan Plenderleith & Josh Gal	November 12, 2025	October 23, 2026 (Nick Jr. Channel)	N/A
64	4	"Dojobot"	Allan Plenderleith	June 7, 2026	October 26, 2026 (Nick Jr. Channel)	N/A
64	4	"A Shark's Life"	Allan Plenderleith & Josh Gal	November 12, 2025	October 27, 2026 (Nick Jr. Channel)	N/A
65	5	"Strength of Steel"	Allan Plenderleith & Becky Overton	November 8, 2025	October 28, 2026 (Nick Jr. Channel)	N/A
65	5	"Bubbles, Bubbles, Lots of Trouble"	Allan Plenderleith & Adam Long	November 11, 2025	October 29, 2026 (Nick Jr. Channel)	N/A
66	6	"Slushy Storm"	Allan Plenderleith & Adam Long	November 7, 2025	October 30, 2026 (Nick Jr. Channel)	N/A
66	6	"Cowboy Steel"	Allan Plenderleith & Becky Overton	November 7, 2025	November 2, 2026 (Nick Jr. Channel)	N/A
67	7	"Rise of the Sub-Zero Sub"	Allan Plenderleith & Ian Carney	November 7, 2025	TBA	N/A
67	7	"Balloon Bonanza"	Allan Plenderleith & Amelia Fergusson	November 13, 2025	TBA	N/A
68	8	"Steel Man Steel"	Allan Plenderleith & Adam Long	November 10, 2025	TBA	N/A
68	8	"The Mystery Heroes"	Allan Plenderleith & Ian Carney	November 10, 2025	TBA	N/A
69	9	"Winter is Coming"	Allan Plenderleith	November 8, 2025	TBA	N/A
69	9	"Kite Fright"	Allan Plenderleith & Josh Gal	November 9, 2025	TBA	N/A
70	10	"Musical Mayhem"	Allan Plenderleith & Amelia Fergusson	November 11, 2025	TBA	N/A
70	10	"Dinobadbot"	Allan Plenderleith & Ian Carney	November 13, 2025	TBA	N/A
Part 2
71	11	"Invisibility Crystal Chaos"	N/A	June 5, 2026	TBA	N/A
71	11	"The Floor is Jelly"	N/A	June 5, 2026	TBA	N/A
72	12	"Steel's Ski Slope Shock"	N/A	June 5, 2026	TBA	N/A
72	12	"Sparkle Sea-prise"	N/A	June 8, 2026	TBA	N/A
73	13	"Cake-Astrophe"	N/A	June 9, 2026	TBA	N/A
73	13	"Solar Storm Scramble"	N/A	June 10, 2026	TBA	N/A
74	14	"The Real Chitter"	N/A	June 5, 2026	TBA	N/A
74	14	"The Slimy Suspect"	N/A	June 5, 2026	TBA	N/A
75	15	"Dino-Kai"	N/A	June 5, 2026	TBA	N/A
75	15	"The Space Ace"	N/A	June 8, 2026	TBA	N/A
16	76	"Cave Invaders"	N/A	November 9, 2025	TBA	N/A
16	76	"Stone Pangolin Surprise"	N/A	June 5, 2026	TBA	N/A
67	17	"Rocks to the Rescue"	N/A	June 6, 2026	TBA	N/A
67	17	"Sock Shock"	N/A	June 6, 2026	TBA	N/A
68	18	"The Forest Flyer Flies"	N/A	June 7, 2026	TBA	N/A
68	18	"Scary Prankster"	N/A	June 9, 2026	TBA	N/A
69	19	"Quake Crystal Quest"	N/A	June 9, 2026	TBA	N/A
69	19	"Yes Day Disaster"	N/A	June 10, 2026	TBA	N/A
70	20	"The Big Freeze"	Unknown	June 11, 2026	TBA	N/A

== Production and history ==
The idea of the deer characters first originated in 2015, going through several revisions and establishing the goals of international IP, according to iQIYI vice president and chief producer Ziaoxuan Yang, who also said they contacted Nickelodeon when the script was completed.

In August 2017, the series was announced by iQIYI and Zhejiang Television under the working title "Deer Run", originally slated to premiere in 2019. During development, the element fire was gonna be included, but it was changed to light after discussions with Nickelodeon, which said that it was too dangerous.

In October 17, 2018, the series became the first to be commissioned as part of a development program that Nickelodeon launched in China. A second season was also confirmed at MIPCOM. In February 23, 2021, a third season was confirmed to be in production.

In July 5, 2024, Dave McRae revealed on his X and Facebook accounts that a fourth season was in production.
