= List of The Great North episodes =

The Great North is an American animated sitcom created by Wendy Molyneux, Lizzie Molyneux, and Minty Lewis that premiered on Fox on January 3, 2021. It features the voices of Nick Offerman, Jenny Slate, Will Forte, Dulcé Sloan, Paul Rust, and Aparna Nancherla.

In August 2022, Fox renewed the series for a fourth season, which premiered on January 7, 2024. In January 2024, co-creator Wendy Molyneux announced in an interview that a fifth season was ordered. In October 2025, the series was canceled after five seasons.

During the course of the series, 97 episodes of The Great North aired over five seasons, between January 3, 2021, and September 14, 2025.

== Series overview ==
Season	Episodes	Originally released	
Season	Episodes	First released	Last released
1	11	January 3, 2021	May 16, 2021
2	22	September 26, 2021	May 22, 2022
3	22	September 25, 2022	May 21, 2023
4	20	January 7, 2024	September 15, 2024
5	22	December 22, 2024	September 14, 2025

== Episodes ==
Although the titles are different, each episode title (with the exceptions of six episodes) has "Adventure" in it.

=== Season 1 (2021) ===
No. overall	No. in season	Title	Directed by	Written by	Original release date	Prod. code	U.S. viewers (millions)
1	1	"Sexi Moose Adventure"	Carlos Ramos & Casey Crowe	Lizzie Molyneux-Logelin & Wendy Molyneux & Minty Lewis	January 3, 2021	1LBW01	2.34
Beef Tobin wants to host Judy's sweet sixteenth birthday on the family boat. However, the planned festivities are interrupted when a moose gets into the house and steals some of Beef's ex-wife's belongings. Beef is distraught at the loss of these possessions, as Beef has difficulties letting go of his ex-wife and accepting change. Shortly after, Judy gets a job at the mall; however, the kids don't want to tell Beef because they think he will have a hard time processing the change. Meanwhile, Honeybee confesses that she wants to move into the family's wood cabin. Wolf rejects the idea, telling her that Beef would not take it well emotionally. Beef talks to Judy's boss and finds out about her job. He is distraught, as the children predicted, and wants to stop all the recent changes. To get back to normalcy, Beef tries to find the moose that stole his ex-wife's things to get them back. The family splits up looking for him. When Beef finds the moose, he aggravates it. The moose attacks, and Beef twists his ankle. He is found by Judy and saved by Moon. At the end of the episode, Beef accepts that change is okay and begins to look forward to the future.
2	2	"Feast of Not People Adventure"	Joel Moser	Minty Lewis	January 17, 2021	1LBW03	6.10
The whole town is excited for the upcoming Feast of Not People. At the festival, the townsfolk celebrate that they are not cannibals, in contrast to the days when early settlers had to eat each other to survive. However, the famous Cake Lady, who bakes a cake for the celebration each year, was arrested and a mysterious party has been fulfilling her orders as the new Cake Lady. When baking the celebration cake becomes too stressful, Ham reveals that he is the new Cake Lady. Keeping the secret from Judy upsets her, because of their twin bond. Judy eventually helps him, and they bake a fabulous cake. Meanwhile, Wolf tries to impress Beef by signing up for a race at the feast, revealing that he has trained for months. The race goes poorly, but Beef tells Wolf that he is very proud of him, as winning isn't all that matters.
3	3	"Avocado Barter Adventure"	Will Strode	Gabe Delahaye	February 21, 2021	1LBW04	1.16
Wolf wants to host a Shrek-themed dinner for Honeybee's 6-month-anniversary. He enlists the entire family's help to make decorations and prepare food. When Honeybee mentions having a dream about avocados, Wolf impulsively decides to make guacamole as a gift, but avocados are rare. Wolf delegates the party-planning to Ham and Beef, and he takes Moon on a "trading chain" to find avocados. Meanwhile, Ham and Beef create themed Shrek decorations for the dinner despite neither of them recalling any accurate details about the movie. Throughout all this, Judy interviews Honeybee about Honeybee's complicated past and how she met Wolf. Near the end of the trading chain, Wolf and Moon have lost their original gift of a couples' massage and only have a box of pears that were mistaken for avocados. Despondent, Wolf considers himself a failure until an ex-girlfriend reminds him that his grand romantic gestures were often misunderstandings of what his partners actually wanted. Wolf realizes that he's done the same thing with Honeybee. The anniversary party arrives, and Honeybee finds the Shrek decorations humorous, and tells Wolf that she doesn't need gifts to know that he loves her, and that she appreciates his grand romantic gestures.
4	4	"Romantic Meat-Based Adventure"	Carlos Ramos & Paul Scarlata	Lizzie Molyneux-Logelin & Wendy Molyneux	February 28, 2021 (Note: Received an early release via FOX.com on February 21, 2021.)	1LBW02	0.97
Judy is about to kiss Steven Huang, but she backs out at the last minute. She talks to Alanis about this, noting that she developed a fear of kissing after she kissed her first boyfriend and his hair got stuck in her braces. Worried that her reticence is genetic, Judy decides to try to get Beef back into the dating ring, to prove they both can find love. Beef is initially resistant, but agrees. The family tries to coach Beef in preparation for his date, but he is a miserable failure and does not know how to socialize. Beef meets a lady named Dell who he likes, but she rejects him. Dell later admits to Beef that she thinks she is cursed when it comes to dating, and that she actually likes him. Judy talks to Beef, who hypothesizes that her fear of relationships actually developed right after her mother left, and convinces her that they'll be okay. He drives her to the Meet and Meat bar, where Steven works, and she kisses him. Meanwhile, Moon takes in a sick bird to teach it to fly, injuring himself in the process.
5	5	"Curl Interrupted Adventure"	Joel Moser	Matt Lawton	March 7, 2021	1LBW05	1.05
Beef's curling team is in trouble, but though Judy is a prodigy at curling, he refuses to involve her since her skill causes her behave monstrously and unsportsmanlike. Judy eventually convinces Beef to let her play, saying that she misses their shared time together. She promises to behave herself. They have fun together coaching the team, until the game arrives and Judy succumbs to her old habits. After she blows up when their team is losing, Beef fires her. Afterward, Judy admits she was wrong and the two decide to find something new to do together, settling on improv. Meanwhile, Wolf gets control of the family boat and decides to open it up to tourists to view the sunset. The first couple, Werner and Ziska are unenthused. Honeybee assures Wolf that the sunsets are magical, despite what tourists think.
6	6	"Pride & Prejudance Adventure"	Neil Graf	Charlie Kelly	March 14, 2021	1LBW06	1.12
Judy talks to Alanis early in the morning about asking her long-time crush Crispin to the Thomas Wintersbone Memorial Ladies' Choice Dance, which commemorates Thomas Wintersbone dying in the snow to prove his love for his fiancee, Ann. Crispin reluctantly says yes to Judy, but has taken a liking to Ham, using Judy as an excuse to meet up with Ham at the dance. At the dance, Ham and Crispin kiss, and Judy sees them, leaving in tears. Ham is devastated at hurting her and rejects Crispin. Judy has a vision of Thomas Wintersbone himself, and he cheers her up by revealing that they got the story wrong: he was gay, and Ann was a lesbian. He died trying to keep their secret. Judy announces this to the attendees and invites Ham to formally ask Crispin to the dance. Meanwhile, Beef's brother Brian and his daughter Becca come to town, and Beef is afraid he is growing out of the old things they used to enjoy, especially when Beef ruins Brian's pitch meeting. Brian assures him that though their interests are different, he still loves him.
7	7	"Period Piece Adventure"	Will Strode	Michelle Badillo & Caroline Levich	March 21, 2021	1LBW07	0.92
Judy is excited to be able to finally express her creative side when the school selects her and her art club to repaint the school's mural. When Alyson gets involved, the club learns that the school uses outdated feminine hygiene products and the mural quickly changes topics, much to Judy's chagrin. The group's antics get the mural project cancelled by the school superintendent. However, Judy realizes that the outdated products are supplied by the superintendent's company, a conflict of interest. The principal agrees to supply new products, and Alyson finds Judy a new mural to paint. Meanwhile, after Beef is publicly shamed after being accused of kicking over a local garden gnome in the town newspaper, Honeybee suspects he is being framed and goes on a mission to clear his name. Their investigation reveals that Junkyard Kyle did it out of revenge for being slighted by another resident, and that Beef was accidentally assumed to be the assailant. The paper prints a retraction.
8	8	"Keep Beef-lievin' Adventure"	Joel Moser	Ted Travelstead	April 11, 2021	1LBW08	1.03
Moon is increasingly discouraged in his attempts to prove Bigfoot exists, and begins doubting its existence. To cheer him up, the family takes Moon to an event of Bigfoot watchers, but an argument with an attendee turns into an outburst where he declares Bigfoot non-existent. Beef, worried that Moon is losing his sense of childhood wonder, hatches a plan to help Moon by faking a Bigfoot sighting. Meanwhile Honeybee's brother Jerry arrives from Fresno, looking to move to Alaska. Honeybee, familiar with the pattern where her brother copies her, but ends up unhappy, tries to dissuade him with help from Wolf by showing him a rigorous Alaskan work day, with several mishaps and injuries. After helping Beef's plan by dressing as Bigfoot and walking past Moon's school, Honeybee realizes that this is perfect for Jerry, who enjoys making people happy. He decides to stay and do party events in the costume.
9	9	"Tusk in the Wind Adventure"	Neil Graf	Kevin Avery	April 18, 2021	1LBW09	0.94
Beef and Wolf encounter Tusk Johnson, former star of a TV series about living in the wilderness, and offer to help him start a new show after hearing of how his sidekick took the show and Tusk's wife. However, Beef realizes that Tusk is a bad influence and during the shooting of an episode, Wolf is nearly killed by Tusk's carelessness. Beef confronts Tusk, telling him to leave. However, Tusk later claims to Wolf that Beef was jealous that he was going to choose Wolf to join his show. Wolf confronts Beef and leaves. Tusk tricks him into attempting to steal golden eagle eggs for Tusk to sell on the black market, only for Wolf to become imperiled over as cliff, requiring Beef to save him. They reconcile, now both aware of Tusk's poor character. Meanwhile, the others become addicted to Dynasty from VHS tapes left behind by Kathleen, only to find Beef taped over the sixth season, but Beef later presents them with DVDs of the last three seasons.
10	10	"Game of Snownes Adventure"	Neil Graf	Kashana Cauley	May 9, 2021	1LBW12	0.84
The Tobins are preparing for a game night when the town is hit by a powerful blizzard. Wolf and Honeybee set out from the guest cabin to the main house, but quickly get lost and separated in the whiteout conditions. Beef, anxious about his family drifting apart, treks into the storm to rescue them, but soon becomes lost himself. Judy, Ham, and Moon go after Beef, but they also get lost. Beef runs into Wolf, and they create a fire, which attracts Judy, Ham, and Moon. Honeybee, having found the toolshed, turns on the floodlights and an old radio, successfully drawing the family to shelter. Beef is impressed by Honeybee's survival skills and comforted in knowing she will take good care of Wolf, as the family enjoys game night. Meanwhile, Jerry and Alyson become snowed-in at the mall by the storm. To pass the time, Allyson decides to re-stage some old vacation photos of herself and enlists Jerry as a stand-in for her old roommate Anthony. Alyson realizes that she misses Anthony, who moved away years ago. Jerry empathizes with Alyson, having similarly lost touch with his friends after moving to Alaska, and they decide to befriend each other.
11	11	"My Fart Will Go on Adventure"	Will Strode	Laura Hooper Beck & Mike Olsen	May 16, 2021	1LBW13	0.81
It's the end of the season and the family is making final preparations for Wolf and Honeybee's Titanic-themed wedding when Judy discovers that, due an error on the invite list, their estranged mother Kathleen has RSVP'd as a "Maybe". Worried that she will almost certainly disrupt the wedding, the siblings conspire to prevent her attendance without Beef knowing; Alyson suggests a "shadow wedding" to distract Kathleen while the real wedding happens, but the plan is compromised when Beef learns of his ex-wife's RSVP. As the plan takes form, Wolf expresses his exasperation over the fake wedding, which Honeybee's family, the Shaws, overhear; the Tobins are forced to reveal their family secret to the Shaws, who reassure them that no family is perfect and they are happy that Wolf and Honeybee are in love. The fake-wedding plan is abandoned, and the family proceeds with the real wedding, which is disrupted only by the late appearance of the actress who played a baby in Titanic, invited by Honeybee as a surprise gift to Wolf. The wedding is a success and the reception continues without a hitch, as the family learns that Kathleen apparently travelled to Tulsa instead. Beef assures them that Kathleen is the one missing out on the joy of their family and friends.

=== Season 2 (2021–22) ===
No. overall	No. in season	Title	Directed by	Written by	Original release date	Prod. code	U.S. viewers (millions)
12	1	"Brace/Off Adventure"	Mario D'Anna	Caroline Levich	September 26, 2021	2LBW02	1.85
In a musical episode, Judy is excited to go to the dentist, only to learn from the latest hire, Dr. Gary, that her braces can removed at her follow up appointment. Judy wrestles with her identity apart from her braces, which she loves. Her friends are excited, because her lack of braces will mean she can sneak into an adults-only poetry slam with them. Her teacher posits that Judy's discomfort has more to do with growing up and having to choose her future as an adult. Her family comfort her, saying that she can take her time to figure out adulthood and showing her that she's managed scary life changes just fine in the past. At her follow up appointment, her regular dentist, Dr. Helena, informs her that Dr. Gary, her son, was wrong and that Judy will likely have braces for most of her life. Judy celebrates her newfound confidence with her friends at a teens-only poetry slam held in Gil's basement. Meanwhile, the Tobins try to replace their beloved toaster, but replacement units keep burning out, until they realize the outlet voltage was too high.
13	2	"The Great Punkin' Adventure"	Celestino Marina	Matt Lawton	October 3, 2021	2LBW01	0.99
Lone Moose's annual banquet is coming up. Mayor Peppers gives Honeybee and Wolf an opportunity to produce a tribute video for the town. They film hours of footage based on various ideas shot across town. Meanwhile, Ham is recruited by some classmates to sing in their punk band after they hear his ability to scream. Unsure of what constitutes a "punk attitude", Ham hears his bandmates complaining about their parents. Despite his positive relationship with Beef, Ham writes a song calling parents jerks and complaining about the activities he and his father share. The band are hired to debut their song at the banquet. Wolf struggles to edit down their hours of footage, but the final film is well received by the residents at the banquet. Worried that Beef will hear his song and be hurt, Ham becomes anxious and flees mid-performance. Outside, Ham apologizes to Beef, who encourages Ham to explore his rebellious side given how agreeable he usually is. Encouraged, Ham decides that being punk is about being honest, and performs his song with changes celebrating parents instead, which the band and the audience enjoy.
14	3	"The Yawn of the Dead Adventure"	Joel Moser	Kevin Seccia	October 10, 2021	1LBW11	1.99
During the annual period of near total darkness in Alaska, the "Dark Days", Wolf tells the family an urban legend of "lumber zombies"—undead workers created to labor through the Dark Days. Ham and Judy worry that the story is too scary for Moon. At school, the children notice strange phenomena that unnerve them related to Wolf's story. When the power goes out and the school is seemingly deserted, Judy and Ham believe that the school is trying to create student zombies to endlessly take standardized tests to provide funding for the school. Moon is skeptical, but when Ham and Judy once again mistake this for fear, he defiantly sneaks through the school alone and discovers the truth: the power went out and the school sent students home and the other phenomena were either related to student safety during the power outage or misunderstood, unrelated events. At home, the twins apologize to Moon, recognizing that he is growing up. He thanks them, but still requests a bedtime story. Meanwhile, Beef undergoes a 24-hour rest and Wolf accidentally destroys Beef's favorite shirt. He and Honeybee enter a shrimp-eating contest to replace it.
15	4	"Wanted: Delmer Alive Adventure"	Tom King	Mike Olsen	October 17, 2021	2LBW04	1.05
Beef's elderly friend Delmer suffers a concussion and Beef retrieves him from the hospital. With instructions not to let him sleep for 4 hours, the Tobins elect to keep him awake by recounting their favorite stories of Delmer as told to them by Beef during their childhood. In the first, young Beef and Brian are unable to find their parents and seek Delmer's help, and they uncover an alien abduction plot of the parents of Lone Moose. In the second, a teenage Beef works at Delmer's sleep-away camp, and they must face off against a killer mutant squirrel who kills the other superficial camp counselors. In the last, a nervous soon-to-be-father Beef goes fishing with Delmer and they encounter a giant sea monster searching for its baby. The stories work and Delmer is kept awake for the 4 hours and is in the clear. Privately, Beef thanks Delmer for inspiring all those stories by serving as a parent to him throughout his life when his neglectful parents could not.
16	5	"Beef's Craig Beef Adventure"	Will Strode	Thomas Reyes	October 24, 2021	1LBW10	1.17
Beef uncharacteristically fantasizes about buying a Sea-Doo. The family resolve to buy him one by participating in the Herring Run, an annual one-day herring fishing period that can net a full-year's salary. Beef is embarrassed by his midlife crisis, but reluctantly agrees. Beloved and successful fisherman Craig Ptarmigan, whom Beef believes holds a grudge against him despite growing up together, also attends the run. As Beef accepts growing older, the Tobins find their attempts to catch herring thwarted by various accidents. When they are pulled over by a Water Patrolman who admits to being paid off by Craig, the Tobins realize that Craig actually is behind the accidents; he's hated Beef ever since they were teenagers and Beef jokingly embarrassed him at a party, ruining his chances with Kathleen, who Beef later married. Craig attempts to ram their boat, but his ship is damaged and sinks. To save Craig and his crew, Beef cuts his nets open, losing the herring they've caught. On shore, Craig and Beef reconcile, with Beef assuring Craig that he was better off without Kathleen. The Tobins find they managed to catch enough herring to afford to rent a Sea-Doo and go out for a ride together.
17	6	"Skidmark Holmes Adventure"	Paul Scarlata	Laura Hooper Beck	November 7, 2021	2LBW03	1.69
Judy throws a boring murder mystery party, but learns that her former friend, Stacey, is throwing a party the same night. Her best friend Kima reassures her it will be okay. When Gil accidentally reveals that he was murderer, Judy's party is ruined. The other guest plan to leave for Stacey's party, but they are all shocked when Kima finds the pizza has been replaced with soiled underwear. The guests remain to figure out who would do such a thing. The pizza parlor sends a replacement pizza, and the delivery girl, Amelia, stays to help them find the culprit. When the replacement pizza is also destroyed, the guests accuse one another. Amelia interrogates the attendees and deduces that Kima and Gil were responsible: sensing Judy's distress over Stacey's competing party, Kima and Gil created an even more interesting mystery by sabotaging the party and ruining the pizzas with the underwear. The other guests admit to having a fun time and Judy thanks Kima when they and Amelia hang out afterward. Meanwhile, Beef goes to hang out with Honeybee and Wolf; Alyson invites herself over, making Beef nervous. Beef attempts to be as "unsexy" as possible toward Alyson, but they cannot resist their mutual attraction, ultimately agreeing to take things slow.
18	7	"Tasteful Noods Adventure"	Michael Baylis	Ted Travelstead	November 14, 2021	2LBW06	1.03
Ham lands a job at local Italian restaurant, MommaPoppa's Ristorante, as part of a school assignment. He hopes to learn from them and further his own dessert career. The owners, Momma and Poppa, happily show him the ropes, but Ham is disturbed when he learns that Momma and Poppa cut corners by reusing half-eaten pasta. Meanwhile, Judy's job placement is at the local newspaper and she unsuccessfully seeks out her first big story. Ham expresses discomfort with their practices, and Momma and Poppa attempt to secure his cooperation by expressing their love for him and promising to feature one of his desserts. Ham begins taking photos and confronts Momma and Poppa, who destroy his phone and fire him. Ham reveals the truth to Judy, who uses it for her story, along with photos from Ham's phone, which he managed to save to the cloud. Judy and Ham are shocked when they see the restaurant busy and open again after only a few days of being shut down. Though they are disheartened that nothing they did seemed to mean anything, Beef reassures them that it's still better to do the right thing.
19	8	"Good Beef Hunting Adventure"	Neil Graf	Kevin Seccia	November 21, 2021	2LBW05	2.15
The guest house toilet breaks, so Honeybee and Wolf stay with the Tobins leading up to Thanksgiving. Honeybee reads a series of children's books owned by the Tobins about a family of Vikings, The Hacking Halvorsons. The new living arrangements cause friction among the siblings: Wolf disapproves of Ham being the chore chief; Ham anxiously tries to plan a Thanksgiving dish for Crispin and his parents; Moon is upset that Ham doesn't have time for him, and the crowding obstructs Judy's attempts to memorize a poem for school. When they all begin arguing, Beef triggers the Beef Hunt, a tradition where the siblings must compete in a series of outdoor survivalist challenges to be given special privileges. As the kids compete, Beef overcomes his phobia of toilets in order to fix the guest bathroom. The kids slowly realize that the challenges are intended to bring them together again through teamwork, culminating with them reciting the Hacking Halvorsons' family oath together. Having fixed the bathroom and his family, Beef congratulates them and they enjoy Thanksgiving together.
20	9	"From Tusk Til Dawn Adventure"	Mario D'Anna	Kevin Avery	November 28, 2021	2LBW07	1.81
A reformed Tusk Johnson returns to Lone Moose, sober and engaged. He seeks to make amends and asks the Tobins to throw him a bachelor party. Wolf enthusiastically agrees; Beef is wary. They throw Tusk's party on their boat and are surprised by the attendance of Tusk's former TV sidekick, Dan. Rather than being dead, Dan was in prison after taking the fall for one of Tusk's scams. Tusk apologizes to him and he accepts. While at sea, Dan privately expresses concern to Beef that Tusk is up to something, and Beef gives him access to the ship to help keep an eye on Tusk. However, Dan holds them all hostage, revealing that he never forgave Tusk and has contacted smugglers that have a bounty on Tusk after a previous scam. The smugglers force them all onto their dilapidated ship, making off with Beef's boat and Tusk. Beef realizes his mistrust helped cause this situation, and he and Wolf manage to board their ship and rescue Tusk. Meanwhile, Honeybee, inspired by her idol Guy Fieri, competes for an open kiosk at the mall with her friend Leslie. When Leslie uses underhanded methods to sabotage the other competitors, Honeybee tricks Leslie into being disqualified, before forfeiting to help a less fortunate contestant win.
21	10	"Dip the Halls Adventure"	Neil Graf	Thomas Reyes	December 19, 2021	2LBW10	1.92
Following Honeybee's advice, Beef invites Jerry out to dinner in an attempt to get to know him and buy him a suitable Christmas present. During the awkward dinner, Jerry mentions his favorite Christmas tradition: Christmas dip. Before he can explain it, Jerry realizes his Bigfoot costume has been stolen from Beef's car. They track it to a psychedelic Christmas party, where they learn that the costume was stolen by wealthy local eccentric, Dick Chateau. A former big game hunter, Chateau now collects mascot costumes. At his mansion, he agrees to return it if Beef and Jerry will agree to be encased in a multi-day body cast to create "costumes" of themselves. They manage to escape with the costume. Beef and Jerry both confess to being nervous to spend time together, but admit that their adventure was fun. Jerry reveals that "Christmas dip" is when he and his father would jump into the winter ocean. Knowing him better now, Beef buys him a suitable gift: a wetsuit to continue the tradition. Meanwhile, when Ham falls ill, the other Tobins take over his job of baking a gingerbread village for the town celebration. Their efforts are a disaster, but Ham recovers in time and makes a new village, expressing his appreciation for their attempts to help regardless.
22	11	"Dances with Wolfs Adventure"	Tom King	Charlie Kelly	January 2, 2022	2LBW09	1.35
Wolf drives Moon to recorder lessons but discovers they are actually counseling sessions for children of divorce. Though Moon is only interested because of the free ice cream, Wolf finds the sessions helpful for himself. However, a memory of seeing his mother, Kathleen, having an affair with his childhood dance instructor, Marcus, right before his dance recital sends Wolf into crisis, believing the divorce was his fault for introducing them. Moon tricks Wolf into taking him to the dance studio, where the owner reveals that Kathleen and Marcus knew each other long before Wolf took lessons. Moon emphasizes that even if Wolf did introduce them, it still wouldn't have been his fault. Wolf expresses admiration of Moon's maturity, and Moon tells him that he had a great upbringing thanks to Wolf. Wolf dances the routine he never got to perform for the owner and Moon. Meanwhile, Honeybee runs afoul of an antagonistic pet bald eagle, Toby, who is also an elected council member, owned by another council member, Roy. Despite figuring out a way to have Toby removed from office, Honeybee relents when she realizes how Toby's presence gives Roy confidence to serve.
23	12	"Beef Mommas House Adventure"	Michael Baylis	Kashana Cauley	February 27, 2022	2LBW11	0.94
Moon's friends have been secretly building a sled together when their moms have a weekly "Moms Night". Eager to join in, he tricks Beef into attending. Beef is apprehensive, but bonds with Dorothy Tuntley, and fellow divorcees and single parents Marie, and Carissa. When he discovers that Carissa's boyfriend Chumbo is cheating on her, he agonizes on whether to tell her, afraid that breaking the bad news will end their friendship. He decides to tell her the truth, and they all get revenge by freezing Chumbo's snowmobile in a solid block of ice. Afterward, they reaffirm their friendship and support for each other. Separately, Moon learns that his friends kept their sled a secret because they consider Moon's criticality to be a downer. Moon promises to withhold judgement, but when their sled turns out to be dangerously unsafe, he secretly keeps them out of harm's way before it crashes. They apologize, recognizing that his concerns were valid. Meanwhile, Honeybee tricks Wolf into thinking an oven mitt is being haunted by a ghost, but learns that while Wolf loves fictional ghost stories, the idea of a real ghost terrifies him. Upon learning the truth, Wolf nevertheless values her efforts.
24	13	"Saved by the Spells Adventure"	Paul Scarlata	Gabe Delahaye	March 6, 2022	2LBW08	1.08
Judy revives an old high school pranking society--The Saved by the Spells--but is dismayed when Principle Gibbons transparently attempts to join as an undercover student, "Joey Tictac". Worried that "Joey" will incriminate them, the society stages a tame prank, then ditches Gibbons to do their real prank. Gibbons arrives as himself and punishes them. Judy realizes that Gibbons actually sought to be a part of their prank and was hurt at being excluded, having never had those friendships when he was their age. She apologizes to him and he relents, instead expelling "Joey" for being the prank ringleader. She sends him a t-shirt making him an honorary inductee of the new Saved by the Spells. Meanwhile, Honeybee and Wolf try to recall what happened following a night of drinking where Wolf got a bellybutton piercing and Honeybee got a tattoo. They eventually learn from Jody Jr. that, drunk on moonshine, they each bet the other and lost. They decide to get matching piercing and tattoos to celebrate making mistakes together. Separately, Moon begins using a ham radio, but Beef, concerned for Moon's safety with strangers, intercepts his messages and responds while pretending to be different trucker personas.
25	14	"Stools Rush in Adventure"	Mario D'Anna	Carrie Clifford	March 13, 2022	2LBW12	0.79
Judy auditions for the school musical, but is dismayed when the director, Mrs. McNamara, casts her as an inanimate stool, and casts volleyball player Chrissy as the lead, opposite Judy's former love interest and Chrissy's current boyfriend, Steven. Chrissy cannot sing, and Mrs. McNamara proposes that Judy sing hidden in the orchestra pit, while Chrissy lip syncs. Judy is upset, but when Steven and his understudy are injured, Judy is the only one who knows Steven's part and proposes to play his role with Chrissy while singing both parts on stage. During intermission, Judy finds Chrissy crying and humiliated. Chrissy reveals that she only auditioned to spend time with Steven and is worried that being the lead highlights her inadequacies while Steven will be smitten by Judy's skill. She explains that Mrs. McNamara cast her as the lead and actively worked to stymy Judy out of a personal dislike for her. They both agree that Mrs. McNamara sucks and finish the show together, happy to shine in their respective activities--volleyball and theater--while supporting rather than competing with one another. Meanwhile, Moon is excited to stay home alone for the first time, but becomes caught in his own Home Alone-style traps.
26	15	"You've Got Math Adventure"	Neil Graf	Caroline Levich	March 20, 2022	2LBW14	0.78
Honeybee learns that Moon is failing math, but is convinced that they just need to find the right context that suits Moon's understanding. Moon confides in her that failing math makes him secretly believe Beef isn't his true father, since his siblings all excel at mathematics. Honeybee helps him investigate three men he thinks may be his real father, though none of them prove to be possible. Encountering a mailman, Reggie, with similar features and tastes, who also struggles with math, Moon entertains that he may be his real father, and enjoys the day shadowing Reggie. Along the way, Moon demonstrates applied mathematical understanding of outdoor scenarios, confirming Honeybee's suspicions. When Reggie reveals a history with his mother, Moon becomes devastated at the real possibility that Beef may not be his father. Honeybee comforts him, but they are relieved when Reggie explains that he's sterile. Honeybee arranges a make-up test with the school, using outdoors-based problems, and Moon passes. Later, Beef tells Moon that he also struggles with math, and Moon is fully convinced he is a Tobin. Meanwhile, a moose becomes attached to the Tobins' van, mistaking it for his calf. To free their van, the Tobins trick it into imprinting on a busted snowmobile instead.
27	16	"As Goldie as It Gets Adventure"	Michael Baylis	Laura Hooper Beck	March 27, 2022	2LBW15	0.82
Ham volunteers at a retirement home and finds it difficult to find time to see Crispin. He meets a resident named Goldie who convinces him to help her throw a birthday party for her late husband, Paul, at their old home, which has since become dilapidated. She also convinces him to sneak the other residents out of the retirement home to attend the party. Goldie and Ham bond by talking about their relationships with Paul and Crispin, respectively. The raucous party ends in the house collapsing, though the attendees all escape unharmed. Returning to the home, Goldie tells Ham that Paul was always busy with work. She thought they would have more time together, but he died suddenly before they could celebrate his birthday; she warns him not to take his time with Crispin for granted. Ham makes time to meet up with Crispin, and they hang out. Meanwhile, Judy takes a pottery class, but her creations are terrible. Not wanting to discourage her by telling her the truth, the family tries to have her instructor, Kurt, tell her instead, but end up charmed by him and enroll for classes as well.
28	17	"Dead Moon Walking Adventure"	Paul Scarlata	Mike Olsen	April 10, 2022	2LBW16	0.77
Beef is devastated when his favorite roadside attraction, the Log Museum, loses its lease. He vows to help its curator, Hector, save it by transporting the entire museum to Beef's property using an ancient log rolling technique. However, during transport, the museum dislodges and falls into a ravine. Hector reveals that he actually chose to close the museum because he wants to retire to Miami. Beef understands and Hector gives him one of the exhibits as a parting gift. Meanwhile, Debbie threatens to beat Moon up after he witnesses her secretly playing with a doll. When all his attempts to appeal to her only end up escalating things, Moon learns from Debbie's mom, Carissa, that Debbie is embarrassed to be seen doing childish things after being bullied in kindergarten for being younger than the other children. Moon brings his own childhood stuffed animal to school to show her that as her friend, he would never tease her for liking her doll and Debbie relents.
29	18	"Beef's in Toyland Adventure"	Neil Graf	Kevin Seccia	April 24, 2022	2LBW17	0.75
The Mighty Kathleen breaks down, requiring a week for repairs. Beef's friend Londra invites him to join her ship in the meantime, but he declines, as he feels having two captains will result in conflict over captaining styles. To kill time at home, Beef begins playing with porcelain figurines, taking them on an imaginary sailing journey. Judy joins him, but desires for her figurine to be the captain, which Beef refuses. Ham and Moon also join, with Ham and Judy's figurines chaffing under Beef's rigidity and abandoning the ship to captain their own boat and go on a fun adventure. Beef acknowledges that he has difficulty relinquishing control. Judy points out that being in control constantly can mean missing out on fun and unexpected experiences, such as spending time with Londra. Beef later approaches Londra and accepts her offer. Meanwhile, Honeybee and Wolf encounter Wade, the most handsome visitor to Lone Moose they have ever seen. Feeling he could be perfect for show business, they get to know him, intending to take him on as a client for their fledgling celebrity management company. When Wade's personality turns out to be dull, Honeybee and Wolf abandon their plans.
30	19	"Poetry of the Penals Adventure"	Michael Baylis	Ted Travelstead	May 1, 2022	2LBW18	0.75
Wolf chaperones the kids on a field trip to the historic Deathcliff Prison, but becomes anxious about proving he's a "fun adult." He sneaks them into an abandoned wing of the prison to locate the solitary confinement cell called The Underwater Coffin. The cell, once used to execute prisoners by drowning, has a clear front wall with holes, flooding at high tide. When the door to the exit is accidentally locked behind them, Wolf takes charge as the cell begins flooding, and climbs out of the cell window, scaling the cliffside to get help. As the rescued kids board the schoolbus, Mr. Golovkin advises Wolf to embrace the fun of adulthood rather than chase his youth. Meanwhile, Beef is charmed by a local poet Greta, and mistakenly claims to be a poet, causing her to invite him to a poetry reading. Eager to look the part, he receives coaching from Honeybee and Moon. Standing at the mic, however, he admits in verse that he is no poet and asks Greta out on a date, which she accepts.
31	20	"Say It Again, Ham Adventure"	Paul Scarlata	Charlie Kelly	May 8, 2022	2LBW21	0.71
When Ham expresses disappointment in his drama-free coming out, the Tobins visit Beef's judgmental estranged cousin Danica, who lives in Orca Bay, to give him a dramatic coming out experience. Before he is able to come out to her, the police arrive to arrest Danica, who reveals that she is a wanted criminal. Brandishing a gun, she holds the Tobins hostage in her basement. Honeybee and Wolf, who drove separately, are doing investigation work around town for their true crime podcast based on the unsolved case of they Orca Bay Slicer, a local serial killer. Their investigation leads them to believe that Danica is the Orca Bay Slicer, and they hurry to her home to warn the others. Seeing the others being held hostage, they attempt to free them, but are held at gunpoint by Danica. Trapped in the basement, Ham realizes that drama-filled coming out experiences don't compare to one he had, which was filled with unconditional love and support from his family. The police manage to disarm and arrest Danica for committing a string of bank robberies; the Orca Bay Slicer case had been solved years ago. At home, the family reenact Ham's dramatic coming out wish list.
32	21	"Slide & Wet-Judice Adventure"	Neil Graf	Gabe Delahaye	May 15, 2022	2LBW20	0.83
A new water park, Splash Crevasse, opens in Lone Moose and every Tobin but Wolf is excited to go, Wolf being convinced he has a curse causing his swim trunks to get lost every time. The family goes without him and Wolf goes to a small, polluted beach, but finds it miserable. As he heads home, he becomes trapped in a sewer pipe. When he manages to escape, he realizes his stubbornness caused him to miss out on a fun day with his family. He hitches a ride to Splash Crevasse with a trucker. While conversing with the truck driver, he realizes that the numerous times he lost his swim trunks as a boy were due to his own careless decisions. Now convinced that there is no curse, he arrives Splash Crevasse, only to find that the others have individually found it to be poorly run, overcrowded, and a miserable experience overall. As the trucker drives away, Wolf's trunks get caught on the door, leaving him naked. The Tobins quickly load into the van and drive away together, relieved to leave Splash Crevasse behind them.
33	22	"Papa Don't Fiend Adventure"	Paul Scarlata	Matt Lawton	May 22, 2022	2LBW13	0.69
The Tobins surprise Beef for Father's Day by staying at Family Land, an RV park they once visited years ago. There, Moon becomes friends with some wild skunks, and Judy is disappointed when a Montrealer boy she meets turns out to be crude, rather than a French sophisticate as she imagined. Meanwhile, Beef is hesitant to leave the camper, which the family learns is because the other residents hate him for blowing up the septic tanks at the park many years ago and disappearing, calling him the "Fiend of Family Land." Beef explains that it was an accident: during their stay, Kathleen had an affair with several men, and distraught, he accidentally dropped a sparkler into an exposed septic tunnel. In the ensuing chaos, Beef grabbed Kathleen and the kids and fled. During the Father's Day Talent Show, the kids perform a skit extolling Beef's virtues as a father and explaining what happened. The residents forgive Beef, but Moon's skunk friends cause a panic where a tiki torch drops into a septic tunnel, causing the same explosions all over again. The Tobins drive away, shaken, but Beef is tickled at the silliness of everything that happened.

=== Season 3 (2022–23) ===
No. overall	No. in season	Title	Directed by	Written by	Original release date	Prod. code	U.S. viewers (millions)
34	1	"A Knife to Remember Adventure"	Neil Graf	Matt Lawton	September 25, 2022	3LBW01	2.13
Wolf and Honeybee decide to try Crocodile Rob's, an Australian-themed restaurant that Beef forbade his children from visiting because he dislikes it after having bad experiences there with their mother Kathleen. Surprised by how much they enjoyed it, they tell the other Tobins. While Beef works to be more personable and host a social club, he accidentally sees the kids coming back from Crocodile Rob's and angrily walks away from them. Feeling conflicted, the kids wonder if the many other places Beef has ordered them to avoid are also fun. Reasoning that Beef is already upset with them, they visit these other locations, gradually coming to the conclusion that their mother's actions were her own and that they need not avoid experiences because of her. Seeing him distraught, Londra talks to Beef, who confides in her about his fears of abandonment and that he actually avoids those places because the good memories he had with Kathleen there are more painful than the bad ones. He realizes that his issues have limited his children and he thanks Londra, who hugs him. Beef moves the club meeting to Crocodile Rob's, joining his kids at their table.
35	2	"Cillian Me Softly Adventure"	Michael Baylis	Kevin Avery	October 2, 2022	2LBW19	1.09
The town prepares for their Emergency Day, an annual event where a submitted disaster theme is chosen and the town runs preparation drills. The town's disaster this year is Moon's submission: dinosaur attack. Residents divide up for their assigned roles as civilians or dinosaurs, and Moon is assigned to boring clerical work for the drills, but finds that he has a knack for filing and organization. Honeybee and Wolf get into an argument about the pronunciation of Cillian Murphy's name. Their first argument disturbs them both: Wolf worries Honeybee will leave him, while Honeybee obsesses about distracting herself with her assigned medical duties. A group of dinosaur attack "survivors" under Wolf's escort instead work together to get him to Honeybee without being "killed" by one of the dinosaur team members, so that he can repair their relationship. Meanwhile, Honeybee realizes that residents are getting genuinely sick, and deduces that the cause is tainted macaroni salad from a nearby food truck. She intervenes to prevent further foodborne illness. Wolf reaches her tent and they reconcile, reasoning that they'll invariably get into fights, but also make up afterward. Meanwhile, Jerry teaches Beef how to ride a bike during their shift as dinosaurs.
36	3	"Autumn If You Got Em Adventure"	Paul Scarlata	Wendy Molyneux & Lizzie Molyneux-Logelin	October 9, 2022	2LBW22	2.04
Known to lead to wild, outrageous behavior by the attendees, Lone Moose's annual Fall Frenzy Dance begins en media res: Beef is dating three women simultaneously, Ham breaks up with Crispin, Honeybee and Wolf are caught in their underwear, and Gil kisses Judy. Earlier, hearing that young love leads to divorce, Ham resolves to break up with Crispin to set him free, but they eventually talk about their commitment fears and resolve to stay together. Meanwhile, Beef accidentally accepts three separate invitations to the dance from Dell, Alyson, and Greta, but they all recognize that Beef is a good-natured person and decide to dance together as a group. Honeybee discovers that the local corn on the cob truck is a sexual trigger for Wolf and they sneak inside it to have sex, fleeing in their underwear to avoid getting caught. Judy finds a list dropped by Gil of the various ways he plans to entice Judy to kiss him, to her distress. However, he assures her it is only a list of his greatest fantasies, and touched, she kisses him. Moon and his friends plan to steal the dance's desserts, but run afoul of schoolmate Quinn, who wants a cut.
37	4	"Code Enough Said Adventure"	Mario D'Anna	Gabe Delahaye	October 16, 2022	3LBW05	0.94
The Tobins, along with Jerry, Cheesecake, and the Tuntleys are trapped inside the cabin during a movie night when the power goes out following a snow storm. The Tobins know that past, prolonged power outages have caused them to engage in outrageous behaviors. To stave off any possibility of that, they all decide to find activities to distract themselves. But after three days, their antics leave everyone on edge, particularly Beef's insistence on rewatching his favorite movie Enough Said again and again. Tensions break when Beef witnesses Ham snapping the DVD in half. The family puts on a chaotic trial, with Wolf and Honeybee as the prosecution and defense, respectively, to determine Ham's guilt. Honeybee ultimately provokes Wolf and the others into admitting their own roles in destroying the DVD: Dorothy suggested destroying it, Jerry accidentally cracked it with his staff, Wolf chewed on it, and Ham finally snapped it in two. The power finally returns, restoring sanity. As the guests head home, the Tobins reflect on their failure to remain calm yet again. Beef reveals he has an extra DVD copy, but felt everyone was having fun and kept it secret, calling dibs on Movie Night to watch it again.
38	5	"Woodfellas Adventure"	Paul Scarlata	Kevin Seccia	October 23, 2022	3LBW04	1.82
During the annual Cavalcade of Ships, the town of Lone Moose is at a morale low point. They nominate The Mighty Kathleen to compete to improve town spirit, but Wolf realizes that every previous winner has had an exceedingly handsome captain. When none of Lone Moose's men meet the requirements, local whittler Archie offers to whittle an attractive decoy mannequin captain and the town agrees. The mannequin, dubbed "Hot Toddie", is indeed handsome, however, the night before the parade, Wolf accidentally lights it on fire. Despite its disfigurement, Wolf insists on using it, but during the cavalcade, the mannequin topples and breaks. Deathcliff wins the cavalcade, but Wolf gives a speech to Lone Moose's residents pointing out that their morale should be high because of their united efforts to win. The town cheers themselves on despite their loss. Meanwhile, Ham recruits Crispin to be a "boat boy" to engage in synchronized walking to guide the cavalcade boats. They are initially distressed by their inability to march synchronously, worried that it reflects negatively on their relationship, but later agree that so long as they love each other, their differences only make them more interesting.
39	6	"Blood Actually Adventure"	Karen Hydendahl	Caroline Levich	October 30, 2022	3LBW03	1.96
Honeybee prepares to return to Fresno to celebrate Halloween with her family, but a storm grounds all flights. Dejected, she tells Jerry that their beloved family tradition is cancelled. However, she is visited that evening by the three Ghosts of Halloween Past, Present, and Future. They show her scenes involving Jerry, and Honeybee hastily concludes that the visions are instructing her to celebrate the way she would anyway and invite Jerry over. She decorates the Tobins' house as gorily and gruesomely as her family usually does and invites Jerry over only for him to decline. Confused, she decides to revisit the Ghosts and learns from them that her family's grisly level of celebration has always been unpleasant and terrifying for Jerry and that he would rather not celebrate it anymore. Realizing the truth, she invites Jerry over and apologizes to him, offering to celebrate Halloween with him in the non-scary way he would prefer. Meanwhile, the storm delays the other Tobins' Halloween costumes from being delivered, except for a black cat suit. The kids each make their case for Beef to decide who to give it to, only for Beef to grant it to himself after trying it on because of how the costume makes his crotch look.
40	7	"Mall-mento Adventure"	Michael Baylis	Kashana Cauley	November 13, 2022	3LBW02	2.18
Beef becomes worried that accompanying Judy for a repair at her job at the mall will embarrass her. He experiences several embarrassing events—ripping his pants, spilling food all over himself, and falling down the stairs—all which seem to embarrass Judy. However, he learns afterward that Judy never noticed and was actually reacting to a sudden break up with her latest boyfriend and seeing him with another girl at the mall. Relieved, Beef helps Judy throw a snowball at her ex. Meanwhile, the other Tobins and Jerry try to finish reading "The Electric Monocle" before seeing the movie adaptation that evening, but find it challenging to get through. They discover that Wolf has snuck off to see the movie without reading the book, and he assures them that the movie was just as unpleasant, so they decide not to go see it.
41	8	"Dick, Rick, Groom Adventure"	Neil Graf	Kevin Avery	November 20, 2022	3LBW06	0.92
Dick Chateau hires Beef to captain his luxury yacht for his brother Rick's wedding. Beef invites Brian, but they are both shocked when Dick states he intends to ruin his brother's wedding because he once had an affair with Dick's former wife Tatianna. Beef and Brian convince him to resolve things with his brother. When they arrive, Dick and Rick reconcile, but at the ceremony, Rick reveals that he only invited Dick in order to humiliate him as he marries Tatianna. Dick is despondent, and Beef and Brian help him ruin Rick's wedding and sail away. Afterward, Brian confesses that he was upset with Beef over something that happened recently and they work it out. Dick is impressed with their ability to openly resolve their brotherly issues. Meanwhile, Wolf receives advice from a man who looks similar to him on how to keep his relationship with Honeybee fresh, and Wolf begins to suspect the man is his future self. Honeybee agrees to help track him down and Wolf has several questions about the future of their relationship, including if Honeybee will get bored with him. Honeybee assures him that will never happen. They have fun tracking the stranger down until they realize he is just a normal Lone Moose resident.
42	9	"Bee's All That Adventure"	Michael Baylis	Charlie Kelly	November 27, 2022	3LBW07	0.97
Kima's family host an exchange student, Jill, from Illinois, and Judy hopes that her mystique will boost her friend group's popularity after being teased by her ex-best friend, Stacy B. However, Jill turns out to be a dorky girl obsessed with bees, and Judy tries to get her to appear cool, giving her a makeover and showing her off. When Stacy invites Jill to hang out with her friends, Judy blows up and bemoans not having any friends, which offends Kima and Amelia. When Kima's mother, Mrs. Brewper, assesses the situation, she tells Judy to appreciate her friends and tells Kima and Amelia to recognize that Judy's obsession is due to the hurt Stacy caused her, and that a hurt friend needs to be cared for. The girls make up and Mrs. Brewper encourages Judy to let Stacy have her superficial existence for as long as it will last. At a school party, Judy decides to get over Stacy and the girls befriend Jill in a genuine way. Meanwhile, Crispin gives Ham a cactus, but it dies on his watch, making him worried that he won't be a good father in the future. Beef assures him that when the day comes, he'll be ready.
43	10	"Xmas with the Skanks Adventure"	Karen Hydendahl	Laura Hooper Beck	December 11, 2022	3LBW08	1.82
The Tobins prepare for the annual Lone Moose gift swap, where residents swap unwanted items for the holidays. The kids intend to reclaim an item they lost at the swap: a lewd dancing Christmas tree toy named Skanky. Beef, who originally bought it for them years ago, hated it so much, he swapped it to get rid of it. The kids fail to recover Skanky when Honeybee sabotages them, revealing that she hates Skanky, too. Skanky instead goes to Santiago. Meanwhile, Moon secretly shelters an escaped reindeer from an abusive live animal display, enlisting Judy, Ham, and Quinn's help during the swap. Quinn deduces that the reindeer is pregnant. Veterinarian Dr. French manages to help it give birth to several fawns, and they agree to send them to the wild animal sanctuary. Afterward, Beef reveals that he hated Skanky because he bought it out of desperation during his first year after the divorce when money was tight; it reminded him of his failure to provide for his kids. However, the kids inform him that they remember it as one of their favorite Christmases, and Honeybee tells him that he shouldn't be ashamed. At home, the kids gift Beef with a new dancing toy, a snowman named Sleazy, to Beef's chagrin.
44	11	"Arranger-ous Minds Adventure"	Paul Scarlata	Mike Olsen	January 1, 2023	3LBW09	0.69
Moon and Quinn initially believe that their teacher Theodore Golovkin has murdered his girlfriend, fellow teacher Mary Anderson, but learn that they've actually broken up. When Mr. Golovkin explains that his inability to reconcile Ms. Anderson moving in with his need for orderliness was the reason for their break up, Moon fears that his own obsession with orderliness will jeopardize his possible chances with Quinn. Searching online, he believes that he and Mr. Golovkin have obsessive compulsive disorder (OCD). This helps Mr. Golovkin confront the impact the disorder has had on his life. With Moon's help, he takes steps to accommodate Ms. Anderson and the two reunite. Mr. Golovkin tells Moon that if Moon does end up having OCD, at least now he'll know and be aware of what to do about it. Moon feels more confident engaging with Quinn, while relaxing on some of his compulsions. Meanwhile, Honeybee and Wolf attempt to win a calendar contest to win the prize trip for a honeymoon. The other Tobins work to help them stage photos of themselves in crab costumes, though their entry loses. However, their calendar delights Santiago, who offers to buy one for enough money to pay for their honeymoon plans.
45	12	"Enough Bed Adventure"	Mario D'Anna	Thomas Reyes	February 19, 2023	3LBW10	0.94
Beef must replace his broken mattress, and enlists the kids' help. Believing they will inherit the bed as an heirloom, each Tobin child tells Beef a story about their preferred mattress that parodies a popular movie. Ham's is based on The Lord of the Rings, Judy's on The Devil Wears Prada, and Moon's on Ford vs. Ferrari. The salesman eventually steps in, chastising the kids for their selfishness and urging Beef to pick a mattress that's best for him, given his many sacrifices for his kids. The kids understand and help him. Meanwhile, Wolf and Honeybee receive a fruit bouquet delivered to them accidentally and try to return it to its correct owners, but end up eating it. After constructing their own, they bring it to the intended recipient couple, but admit what they had done. They learn that the sender is a bitter ex of one of the recipients and the original fruits were ones the couple are deathly allergic to. The couple thanks them.
46	13	"Sister Pact Too Adventure"	Neil Graf	Carlee Malemute	February 26, 2023	3LBW11	0.72
To celebrate their sisterhood, Judy books a feminist retreat for herself and Honeybee, but Judy becomes dismayed when Honeybee seems uninterested in the event's bonding activities. When the event is revealed to be a pyramid scheme and cult led by a man who is only capitalizing off of feminism, Honeybee and Judy attempt to leave. While hiding from the cult members and waiting for their ride to arrive, Judy tearfully asks if Honeybee's disinterest is because she doesn't view them as sisters. Honeybee tells her that she suspected that the retreat was fraudulent all along, and that she does view Judy as her sister. Meanwhile, Beef is beset by an eccentric high school classmate, Zelda, who arrives on the Tobin doorstep seeking to marry Beef, based on a pact they made in their youth to marry if they were both single by age 40. Beef lies that he has recently married, but none of the women in town receive his voicemails asking them to play his wife. They ultimately have Jerry dress up in his Bigfoot costume and pretend to be Beef's sick wife, Shandor. When the other women arrive having received Beef's request for help, Zelda concludes that Beef must be cheating on Shandor and leaves in disgust.
47	14	"Boy Meats World Adventure"	Karen Hydendahl	Kashana Cauley	March 5, 2023	3LBW13	0.67
Moon and Ham enter The Little Mr. Ketichikan Canned Sausage Gentleman Pageant, causing the Tobins to take sides as they help them prepare to win, including Beef's brother, Brian. The town of Lone Moose had been banned from participating for 30 years after someone sabotaged Beef, causing him to have diarrhea onstage. However, Brian reveals that Beef, afraid he might lose, staged the sabotage and that his stunt caused Lone Moose to be banned. Wolf is chosen to be the MC and works on an opening routine that is both a roast and respectful. Though Moon and Ham are pitted against each other, the two reconcile during the competition and attempt to compete together, only to be disqualified for violating the rules. John wins instead and moves on to represent Lone Moose in the finals. The Tobins agree that the competition was negatively affecting them and Beef apologizes to the boys for picking favorites, but encourages them to compete again next year.
48	15	"Can't Hardly Date Adventure"	Michael Baylis	Matt Lawton	March 12, 2023	3LBW12	0.65
Alyson reveals that she plans to meet and marry an online friend and Beef, alarmed, offers to drive her there. Taking a ferry to reach the meet up point, Beef confesses his feelings for her and the two enjoy a romantic first date on the boat, ending with a kiss. Alyson confesses that she agreed to get married because it was the only romantic thing she hasn't tried before. Beef supports her, but tells her she is a catch and shouldn't settle. At the meet up spot, her friend turns out to have catfished her, and Beef helps Alyson bail on him. On their way back home, Beef admits that his immediate instincts after they kissed were to commit and settle down together, like he had with Kathleen, causing him to realize that he needs more dating experience. Alyson supports him and tells him he shouldn't settle, either. Meanwhile, Wolf tries to get an old schoolmate to like him, despite Honeybee's warnings not to overspend energy just to be liked. During their hang out, when his schoolmate turns out to be thoroughly unpleasant, Wolf ditches him, realizing he doesn't need everyone to like him.
49	16	"Great Bus of Choir Adventure"	Paul Scarlata	Drew Hanks	March 19, 2023	3LBW14	0.64
While Beef takes Moon out for a survivalist retreat, Honeybee and Wolf are left to care for the Tobin home and try out different parenting styles with Judi and Ham in anticipation of raising their own kids one day. They get more opportunities when Judy and Ham throw a secret party in the nearby cabin and when feuding show choir singers takes refuge with them after their bus breaks down nearby. Wolf's style is too gentle and he fails to shut down the party, while Honeybee's style is too hardline and fails to stop the singers' feud. They realize that they can succeed by combining their styles: They shut down the party and they talk about responsibility with the twins, and they help the singers put aside their differences with open dialogue. Afterward, Honeybee and Wolf to decide to wait a bit longer before having kids. Meanwhile, Beef's survivalist retreat turns out to be in the city, and not the outdoors. Moon is frustrated that his wilderness survival skills don't work in the city, but Beef teaches him how to think about survival in society differently. Moon manages to use his wits to contact Uncle Brian and they take shelter at his house.
50	17	"A Bear-tiful Find Adventure"	Mario D'Anna	Ted Travelstead	April 16, 2023	3LBW15	0.63
Honeybee chafes against her routine, but finds excitement again when she and other residents discover Ted—bear mascot of neighboring town Ted's Folly—dead in a restaurant bathroom after Cheesecake admits he went on a bender and accidentally freed it. Worried Lone Moose's bitter feud with Ted's Folly will be reignited, they all attempt to secretly return the bear in their van, but run into town councilman Roy. Thinking that Roy's strict rule-following will blow the plan, they ditch him. Ted wakes up in the van very much alive. Ted's Folly's mayor accuses them of kidnapping Ted. Roy appears, noting that Lone Moosers stick together, and threatens to report the mayor for wildlife statute violations unless he lets them all off. Meanwhile, Ham and Moon ditch Picture Day to recover Dagmar, a coconut "brother" Moon created out of envy over Ham and Judy's close bond, and later buried. He sadly discovers that Dagmar's burial site has since been paved over. Ham assures Moon that the two of them will be just as close. Judy dresses as her brothers for their Picture Day photos, which Mr. Golovkin allows after she helps him plan last minute for his one year anniversary with Ms. Anderson.
51	18	"Pa-shank Redemption Adventure"	Neil Graf	Mike Olsen	April 23, 2023	3LBW16	0.76
When Beef misinterprets signs that the kids plan to throw him a surprise birthday party, he exploits one of Lone Moose's laws to get arrested and placed in jail for the night to avoid it. The kids, knowing Beef hates celebrating his birthday, attempt to have him released to no avail. Beef is placed in cell with a resident named Peter and Beef's cousin Danica, who is awaiting sentencing for her previous bank robberies. Danica and Peter, revealed to be her paramour, break out and take Beef with them. Danica robs a bank with Peter and Beef's assistance. Beef asks Peter what he sees in someone as unpleasant as Danica, and Peter responds that he liked a woman named Wanda, but didn't feel worthy of her, and has settled for Danica. Beef realizes that he feels the same about his birthday: he loved his birthday as a child, but his negligent parents never celebrated it, so he internalized hating his birthday for fear of being disappointed. He convinces Peter to flee and find Wanda, and Beef foils Danica's plot. Danica is arrested and Beef explains his issues to his kids, who give him a gift and propose future birthday celebrations.
52	19	"Rear Genius Adventure"	Michael Baylis	Laura Hooper Beck	April 30, 2023	3LBW17	0.66
During the Rear Gifts Festival, which celebrates the gift of moose droppings, the Tobins, Tuntleys, and Evanoffs prepare to cheat their way to win the Turd Drop. However, they reluctantly agree to a truce after a plea from Mayor Peppers, who wants to enjoy a day off without having to deal with the fallout of their rivalry. Wolf discovers that new resident Barbara Baconbottom is actually Mayor Ted, of hated rival town Ted's Folly, in disguise, who plans to cheat to win the drop and rub it in Peppers's face. The three families agree to work together, combining their cheating strategies to foil Mayor Ted's plans and expose him. Wolf drops the winning turd with the families' names on it to celebrate their working together for Peppers's sake. Peppers thanks them. Meanwhile, Ham tries to make friends with boys his age, worried that all his friends being older women is weird. When he becomes distracted and befriends yet another older woman, Regina, she and Crispin help him befriend a teenage boy at the festival, who, as it turns out, shares Ham's same affinity with older women.
53	20	"Barrel Be Blood Adventure"	Karen Hydendahl	Thomas Reyes	May 7, 2023	3LBW18	0.59
A fish vending machine company establishes its machines in Lone Moose, attracting resident interest and driving down the price of fish for its fishermen. Beef, Craig, and Londra unsuccessfully try to stop it, even by attempting to appeal to the company's owners. Beef later realizes that the company is intentionally misrepresenting its meat, selling cheaper fish as more expensive species. Beef informs the town's residents and also persuasively appeals to them that they should support each other regardless, rather than knowingly use services that exploit and harm their fellow residents' livelihoods. Meanwhile, Judy and Kima, bolstered by a new movie, are excited to experience their first smokejumper shift as interns at an all-women smokejumper base. They are disappointed when the smokejumper women seem lackluster by comparison and unmotivated. They attempt to bolster their morale by building an obstacle course inspired by the movie out of crucial firefighting supplies, upsetting the smokejumpers. When a local fire is called in, Judy and Kima marvel at the women's prowess, realizing that watching a dramatized movie doesn't make them experts compared to the smokejumpers' years of experience.
54	21	"For Whom the Smell Tolls (Part 1)"	Mario D'Anna	Caroline Levich	May 14, 2023	3LBW19	0.61
A noxious smell and seismic activity have been plaguing Lone Moose as preparations for the school prom begin. Judy and Kima work to secure dates matching their physical preferences, but begin finding themselves attracted to the personalities of each other's dates. Ham and Crispin successfully lobby for Prom King and Queen to be changed to the gender neutral "Prom President and Vice President". Beef and the townsfolk run across eccentric Looney Larry, who claims to know the origin of smell, which is only getting stronger. Larry confesses that his former employer, a meat plant, disposed of their products in underground bunkers, one of which is located directly under the school. He warns that climate change has thawed the normally-frozen ground, causing the meat to thaw and rot. The bunkers are going to explode from the build up of gases, which is causing the seismic activity. Beef and the others race to evacuate the school, but are too late as the bunker explodes, causing surging mountains of rotting meat to break through the school grounds, trapping the prom attendees inside. Worse still, the smell has attracted ravenous and aggressive pizzlies, making rescue efforts seem all but impossible.
55	22	"For Whom the Smell Tolls (Part 2)"	Neil Graf	Kevin Seccia	May 21, 2023	3LBW20	0.65
Ham and Crispin take charge as president and vice president, managing to locate a way to the roof and move everyone to safety atop the school roof. Learning of a second bunker, Beef and Walt climb down to it and defuse the pressure, but Honeybee finds that blueprints owned by Beef's great grandfather, who sold the land to the meat company, reveal a third bunker under the school that cannot be reached. Junkyard Kyle preps an emergency tractor that can reach the children, but the pizzlies swarm it. Beef manages to communicate to the kids that the school could explode. Faced with death, the kids elect to have prom on the roof and Judy and Kima agree to swap their dates. The loud music scares the pizzlies away, freeing Junkyard Kyle to evacuate them, just before the school explodes. Afterward, a second prom is thrown as the school is rebuilt and Judy's relationship with her date Eli grows. Beef feels guilt over his family's involvement in the environmental disaster. However, Walt explains this resulted from decades of everyone's complicity. Beef concludes that what matters is to work to address the town's problems now before they can cause any more damage.

=== Season 4 (2024) ===
No. overall	No. in season	Title	Directed by	Written by	Original release date	Prod. code	U.S. viewers (millions)
56	1	"Bad Speecher Adventure"	Damil Bryant	Asha Michelle Wilson	January 7, 2024	4LBW02	0.81
Ham stresses about giving a speech assignment about Alaska in front of Moon's infamously mean classmates. The family try to give him ideas while Moon savagely critiques each one. Judy's is about Bob Ross's years painting while serving in the United States Air Force in Alaska, inspired by Top Gun, featuring herself. Beef's is about the origins of the Alaska state flag, inspired by Good Will Hunting, featuring Quinn. Honeybee's is about the invention of ranch dressing, inspired by The Matrix, featuring herself. Based on Moon's criticisms, Ham realizes the best way to win Moon's class over is to give them cupcakes to distract them while he gives his speech about Alaska's coastline.
57	2	"Risky Beefness Adventure"	Neil Graf	Ted Travelstead	February 18, 2024	4LBW01	0.45
Beef suffers a near-death experience where his penis communicates to him that he needs to begin having sex again after years without. The kids help him set up hook ups on various dating apps, but they end in failure, until Beef runs into Greta. They have sex, but Beef is mortified when Greta is inspired to publish poems about their sexual activities in the local newspaper. He recreates his near-death experience to talk with his penis again, but also ends up in a conversation with his heart, Dennis, who tells him that in addition to sex, he also needs to seek romantic love again, too. He agrees to try dating again. Meanwhile, Jerry recruits Moon to be his "little brother" Bigfoot for his mascot party gigs. They are a hit, but are later threatened by a rival clown duo who challenge them to a party entertainer fight. Jerry and Moon manage to ditch them and decide to end their duo act. Finding they enjoyed being brothers, they opt to continue hanging out.
58	3	"Aunt Misbehavin' Adventure"	Karen Hydendahl	Gabe Delahaye	February 25, 2024	4LBW04	0.44
Moon is humiliated when he asks Quinn to a rehearsal dance and she turns him down without an explanation. The family discovers that Beef's long lost elder Aunt Dirtrude "Dirt" Tobin has been secretly living in a bunker on the Tobin property for 60 years out of fear of a Communist invasion. As the family acclimates Aunt Dirt to the present, Moon locks himself in the bunker to avoid facing Quinn's rejection at school or the dance. Dirt, having realized all she missed while in the bunker, including a more accepting society for queer women like her, helps coax Moon out of the bunker. She encourages him to experience his life, in spite of rejection he might encounter. Moon accepts her advice and asks her to accompany him to the dance. At the dance, Quinn explains that since the dance is a practice for their future prom, she wanted to trial run it and brought her pot bellied pig as her date, intending to save Moon for the real dance. They dance together. Later, Moon agrees to visit Dirt regularly in her bunker, which she now uses as an apartment.
59	4	"Ready Mayor Won Adventure"	Neil Graf	Marina Cockenberg	March 3, 2024	4LBW05	0.47
When Mayor Peppers undergoes a medical procedure, the town votes Honeybee in as interim mayor for one day. Despite hoping he would win and preparing extensively to serve, Wolf resolves to support Honeybee. Honeybee opts to cut through the red tape and passes several ordinances brought to her by various townsfolk, to their delight, boosting her popularity. Wolf repeatedly cautions her, causing friction between them. However, when Honeybee realizes that haphazardly passing ordinances has caused major conflicts and chaos throughout the town, she becomes despondent. She and Wolf make up, and Wolf opts to save Honeybee's reputation by agreeing to serve as temporary interim mayor and take the blame as he rescinds the ordinances while using his preparation to resolve any remaining conflicts. As her term ends, Honeybee and Wolf lovingly reenact a scene from The Bodyguard.
60	5	"Cheese All That Adventure"	Damil Bryant	Kevin Seccia	March 10, 2024	4LBW10	0.59
When Cheesecake loses his camper, Wolf invites him to stay with them and tries to help him find a job. Honeybee is wary, due to Cheesecake's unreliable nature. Cheesecake manages to get a job, but needs Wolf's help at every turn. Honeybee strongly encourages Wolf to break their codependent relationship and let Cheesecake figure things out on his own. She tells him to trust that their friendship can weather this growing period. Wolf and Cheesecake talk and he assures Wolf that he can do things on his own and that they'll always be friends. However, the next day, Cheesecake is fired, but receives hush money from the company CEO after Cheesecake experiences several workplace safety violations and an attempted coverup. The three go out and celebrate Cheesecake finding his own way to support himself. Meanwhile, Beef begins patronizing Carissa's new coffee shop, building on their mutual attraction. His "Alaskan persona" attracts tourist business for the shop, so he begins neglecting his fishing boat, leaving it to Wolf. Though Carissa is touched that Beef has been helping her, she encourages him not to neglect his fishing for her, and instead suggests they date each other, which Beef is pleased to do.
61	6	"The Mighty Pucks Adventure"	Damil Bryant	Thomas Reyes	March 17, 2024	4LBW06	0.48
The town receives their annual oil dividend checks, which Judy abhors due to the oil industry's environmental record. She plans a one-woman show castigating the practice, but fails to get an audience. Despondent, she learns that local hockey team, The Puckchuckers, need a sponsor. Believing that helping them win will provide her an audience to watch her show during the halftime show, she donates her saved checks to sponsor them and begins coaching the ragtag team to victory using her theater skills. Though the team does well, her show is poorly received by the hockey goers. The team works with her to redevelop the show in an entertaining way for the finals, and Judy is satisfied to find the show has changed some people's minds about responsibly donating their checks to fight the oil industry. Meanwhile, the Tobins spend their checks in various ways: Crispin and Ham open a high-stress kitchen-themed smoothie stall; Beef, Dirt, and Moon search for something silly to buy and purchase a Zamboni; and Honeybee and Wolf open a 24-hour gym in their cabin, but shut it down when running it interferes with their relationship.
62	7	"Judy Presents: The Staircake"	Michael Baylis	Caroline Levich	March 24, 2024	4LBW07	0.51
Ham qualifies for a prestigious cake contest in New Fork, but his cake is so large, they use a junked bus they procured to transport it. The family agrees to go, but it goes badly: Beef stays up all night watching TV and is too tired to drive, forcing Ham to drive instead; Wolf and Honeybee wear Shrek costumes that render them mostly immobile and unable to stabilize the cake; Moon jumps off the bus once they pass a fireworks outlet; and Judy does nothing but film the ensuing chaos for her documentary. When the bus's brakes give out, crashing into a roadside fireworks stand, the cake is damaged. The rest of the family complain about the trip, causing Ham to angrily lash out at them for their selfish behavior. Beef talks with Ham, who apologizes and minimizes his hurt feelings, but Beef encourages him to treat his feelings as important and not to minimize his aspirations. The family, feeling bad, sell their personal items to buy a wagon, which they use to pull Ham to New Fork while he disguises the damaged cake sections with dirt. The judges taste the undamaged portions and declare him the winner.
63	8	"Bear of Beeftown Adventure"	Karen Hydendahl	Charlie Kelly	April 7, 2024	4LBW12	0.47
Beef plans to ask Carissa to be his girlfriend during the town's Fat Bear Week contest, but becomes distraught when he sees Carissa's attention taken up by her attractive new coworker, Axel. Seeing his favorite older bear, The Kid, being outdone by a new younger bear, The Hunk, in the contest, Beef displaces his insecurities over his romantic competition onto The Hunk and attempts to scare it away to help The Kid. Beef narrowly escapes serious injury thanks to Wolf, who advises him that dating is a risk worth taking, and to just be himself and hope Carissa values that. Beef asks Carissa to be his girlfriend and she accepts, assuring him that Axel was not her type. Meanwhile, Dirt approaches Ham for help getting into the lesbian bar scene. They try several bars, none of which are to Dirt's taste. Londra helps them locate a queer women's speakeasy more to her taste, but Dirt realizes her discomfort being newly out is the real barrier. Ham and Londra encourage her to get out and experience more with her identity and Dirt successfully strikes up a conversation with another patron.
64	9	"Idita-Ruth Adventure"	Michael Baylis	Matt Lawton	April 14, 2024	4LBW03	0.55
Honeybee's mother, Ruth, visits during the Iditarod Trail Sled Dog Race. Wolf becomes flustered, exhibiting bizarre behavior around Ruth, culminating in him drunkenly performing a country song for her, after learning that country music is her favorite. As Ruth tends to Wolf privately, he admits that his mother only seemed to like him when he acted strangely for her amusement. Ruth recognizes that she is Wolf's mother figure now as well, and teaches him about maternal support and healthy boundaries. Wolf performs his song, praising Ruth for her motherliness, in front of the town, touching Honeybee. Meanwhile, Ham bakes a dog treat cake for the town's dog, Toast, who is competing in the race, but he, Judy, and Beef ashamedly find the cake irresistible. Separately, Moon, Russell, and Henry learn the local library has removed all its obscenely vandalized books, and the trio lucratively sell the discarded books to their fellow students. When they run out, they recruit Bethany, the original vandal, to make new ones to sell. When Henry begins to maniacally run the enterprise, Moon, Bethany, and Russell all quit and leave him to do it alone.
65	10	"A Chug's Life Adventure"	Karen Hydendahl	Kit Boss	April 14, 2024	4LBW08	0.49
Beef hears that a bar from his youth, Toe in the Snow Tavern, known for its preserved toe in a jar, is going out of business. In their youth, Craig Ptarmigan could always get him to take on dares when they got drunk there, but Beef left his wild lifestyle to raise the kids. He signs up with Honeybee and Wolf for the bar's beer drinking tug of war competition in an effort to save it with the prize money. They make it to the final competition against the Ptarmigans, but Craig exploits Beef's joyful inebriation and the Ptarmigans win. As Beef continues to party, Honeybee suspects that reliving his responsibility-free youth again is good for Beef, and they let him enjoy himself. The next morning, a hungover Beef is mortified that he failed the bar, but Wolf and Honeybee reveal that he successfully took Craig's $6,000 dare to swallow the preserved toe, saving the bar with his winnings. Meanwhile, Ham and Judy seek out a former student and party legend after being excluded from Stacy B.'s kegger. However, they find that since school, he's become boring and domestic. They photoshop party photos with him to make Stacy jealous.
66	11	"High Expectations Adventure"	Neil Graf	Carlee Malemute	April 21, 2024	4LBW09	0.59
Kima and Judy attend the Alaskan Student Summit in Juneau chaperoned by Mr. Golovkin, where they will present a reenactment of Indigenous rights activist Elizabeth Peratrovich's 1945 speech to the legislature. That morning, another attendee at the hotel offers them weed gummies, which they unwittingly consume. While high, Kima hallucinates that Elizabeth is speaking to her from the logo of an Indigenous woman on a cottage cheese tub. Elizabeth convinces Kima to steal Mr. Golovkin's van with Judy and rampage around the city. The experience deepens Kima's connection to her Indigenous roots, recognizing the progress she can experience thanks to Elizabeth. Later, while giving her presentation, she is inspired by Elizabeth's legacy to boldly call out a bigoted anti-Indigenous rights legislator sitting in attendance. Meanwhile, the Tobins go to lunch at the Hoagie Pony, which has the Wet Wolf, a sandwich invented and named after Wolf. But when the sandwich is no longer available, Wolf and the Tobins protest. The owner finally reveals that the sandwich is terrible and no one orders it except Wolf and his family. Wolf is disappointed, but the owner offers to rename the water station after him as a gesture of good will.
67	12	"Any Court in a Storm Adventure"	Michael Baylis	Laura Hooper Beck	April 28, 2024	4LBW11	0.39
The Tobins are once again trapped in their home during a snowstorm, along with Jerry and Mr. Golovkin. Though Beef promises that the Tobins will not descend into their usual madness, he suddenly adopts the persona of a ship captain, assigning ranks to everyone else and forces them to all clean the house in painstaking detail. After several days, the others begin to fray under Beef's rule, but request that he distribute some specialty chocolates he had ordered earlier to appease them. Beef refuses, but the family find him with a box of the empty chocolates. Disgusted by his greed, they mutiny and stage yet another chaotic trial, where it is ultimately revealed that Jerry ate all the chocolates. Jerry attempted to frame Beef in revenge for causing yet another chaotic lock down fiasco after promising things would be different this time. The storm lifts and power—and sanity—are restored to the household. Beef reveals that the captain persona was a ploy to preempt their typical snowstorm madness with something silly, but still shows signs of his own delirium.
68	13	"You've Got Sail Adventure"	Neil Graf	Asha Michelle Wilson	May 5, 2024	4LBW16	0.52
Cruise ships are docked in Lone Moose and Beef and his fellow fishing captains revel in their longstanding distaste for cruise ship captains and vice versa. Beef is also excited to finally meet his internet pen pal, but is shocked to discover that Cornelius "Fisherman1!" Fisher is a cruise ship captain. The two try to resolve their differences, but Beef's attempts to hide the relationship causes Fisher to leave. When the other fishing captains plan to deface Fisher's cruise ship, Beef reveals their friendship and publicly makes amends. Fisher accepts, but the other cruise ship captains and fishing captains get into a food fight. Fisher and Beef agree to continue their friendship. Meanwhile, springtime makes Judy eager to make out, and she schedules multiple dates with annoying tourist boys. She disastrously schedules a date with all three at the same restaurant, but learns that all three are also on multiple dates with other teens, including the locals, who themselves are on multiple dates. The mass of teens all proceed to make out in various couplings. Elsewhere, Dirt ropes Moon and Ham into scamming tourists with fake "Moose Milk" health beverages, but flee when their scam is uncovered by their angry patrons.
69	14	"Doctor? No! Adventure"	Damil Bryant	Matt Lawton	May 12, 2024	4LBW14	0.47
Beef experiences debilitating pains, but refuses to see a doctor. The boys, concerned, try to bring him to Dr. Callahan, but Beef angrily storms out. He suffers another attack on the way home and passes out in the snow, imagining another conversation with his heart, Dennis, where he expresses fear of a fatal diagnosis. Dennis convinces him to seek medical treatment to live rather than die in fear. Upon waking, Beef manages to signal to the boys and Callahan. At the hospital, Callahan diagnoses Beef with gall bladder stones and surgically removes them. Beef apologizes to the boys. Meanwhile, Honeybee, unnerved when an old friend writes her off as having given up her life for a man, finds an old gravestone simply engraved "Wife 1888". She becomes determined to uncover the woman's identity with Judy and Dirt. After confessing her concerns to them about dying a nobody, they assure her that she is already legendary in Lone Moose. "Wife" turns out to be Manifred Wife, a serial killer who murdered her husband, a somebody indeed. To further cheer her up, Wolf gets Honeybee her own Tobin Family headstone, which includes engraved facts about her life and space for her future endeavors.
70	15	"Fifty Worst Dates Adventure"	Damil Bryant	Marina Cockenberg	May 19, 2024	4LBW17	0.49
Dorothy and Marie, alarmed that Beef has yet to take Carissa on a date, order him to do so. Concerned, Beef plans multiple dates on Alaska's longest day. The unending dates begin to wear on Carissa, and upon learning that Beef planned them because of their friends, she becomes embarrassed and upset, causing the two to fight. The two make up when Beef explains that he wanted to go on the dates not just because of their friends, but also because he never got to do them with Kathleen. They agree to go on normal dates together. Meanwhile, the Tobins babysit Debbie, who supports her mom and Beef's relationship and is eerily on her best behavior. Honeybee and Judy purchase a replacement inflatable pool for one previously destroyed by the boys' antics. They ban the others from using it. The disgruntled boys and Debbie retaliate by making a more rule-free water slide and ban Judy and Honeybee, but the two girls destroy the second pool when they try to go on the slide by force. They resolve to buy individual pools for their individual interests. Dirt meanwhile tries to return a pair of pants to the store, but comes up against its new owner's rigid return policy, succeeding through her own stubbornness.
71	16	"Excess Cabbage Adventure"	Michael Baylis	Jay Kasten	September 1, 2024	3LBW21	0.49
Judy feels lonely for a maternal connection during Lone Moose's annual mother-daughter celebrations, and seemingly finds it in Sherry, an eccentric woman who purchased several of her paintings. Judy is warned by a local that Sherry may be a cult leader, but when her family is more interested in their entry in the town's giant produce competition—a giant cabbage—than listening to her feelings, she seeks Sherry out. At Sherry's urging, Judy takes her and two of her friends on the Kathleen for a tour of the harbor. However, Sherry reveals that she is indeed the leader of a cult and believes that they must kill themselves to transcend to a new dimension. Judy rebuffs her, realizing that Sherry only took advantage of her loneliness. Sherry and her followers detain Judy and try to enact their suicide pact, but Judy manages to contact her family for help, who immediately abandon the cabbage to save her with the help of authorities. Sherry is arrested and Judy takes comfort in knowing she has her family, and a network of women in her life who serve as mother figures to her.
72	17	"Welcome to Miami Adventure"	Karen Hydendahl	Gabe Delahaye	September 8, 2024	4LBW15	1.16
Judy is distraught after her boyfriend "Cool Mike" breaks up with her. Though Judy is more interested in talking through what happened, Honeybee insists instead on having a Girls Night with her and Dirt to help Judy get over it. Their plans go awry when they accidentally crash into another car driven by Miami, an erotic aquatic mermaid dancer. Making amends, they decide to follow him to his gigs as a way to salvage their Girls Night, but Judy breaks down in tears, revealing that Mike was not only seeing someone else, but that he broke up with Judy because he found her social media interview show and her dancing embarrassing, humiliating her. Judy now feels ashamed of her artistic expression, but Miami encourages her to do what she loves for the sake of being an artist, like he does with his aquatic mermaid dancing. They all go and confront Mike in public on Judy's interview show, helping Judy regain her dignity and confidence. Meanwhile, the Tobin men, along with Cheesecake, Crispin, and Jerry, hold a Boys Night, but divide into warring factions over the movies Olympus Has Fallen and White House Down.
73	18	"Worst Drives Club Adventure"	Karen Hydendahl	Carrie Clifford	September 8, 2024	3LBW22	0.88
Judy must secure her driver's license before a girls road trip with Kima and Amelia, but always freaks out and speeds off, crashing her car. Both Beef and Honeybee attempt to help her, but repeated crashes cause Judy to give up. She attempts to drive by herself, and discovers that her crashes are due to the excitement she feels in anticipation of getting her license, and thereby her independence and freedom, coupled with her anxieties about using this freedom to eventually leave Lone Moose and disappoint her father. She talks with Beef, who tells her that he'll always want her to stay, but also wishes for her to leave and explore. She goes off on the trip with her friends. Meanwhile, the other Tobins find a puzzle and begin putting it together, only to realize to their horror that it's a nude image of Kathleen, their mother. Beef completes the puzzle and recognizes that it was an image he took. He believes Kathleen secretly made it for him as a gift, but must have forgotten about it after getting drunk. He appreciates it as one of the few thoughtful things she did for him.
74	19	"Look Who's Squawking Adventure"	Neil Graf	Brian Bahe	September 15, 2024	4LBW13	0.59
Moon and Beef are babysitting Toby the Eagle, but Beef is unnerved by Moon's fondness for dangerous animals and seeming lack of precaution around them. His agitation causes Toby to escape and begin terroizing the town. Despite Beef's protests, Moon insists he knows how to handle Toby. He demonstrates expertise in eagle behavior and manages to safely recapture Toby. Beef apologizes to Moon, and accepts that Moon's knowledge and skill with animals is legitimate, but still insists as a concerned father that he take better precautions. Meanwhile, the other Tobins find a tarot deck, but when Judy draws three Death cards while reading Ham's future before he meets up with Crispin in the afternoon, the others insist on protecting him and avoiding a Final Destination scenario. While dodging potential dangers, Ham makes it to the meet up and celebrates avoiding his predicted fate.
75	20	"Am I the Ice Hole? Adventure"	Karen Hydendahl	Ted Travelstead	September 15, 2024	4LBW18	0.56
The school announces it will be retiring Bonesy, a skeleton model made of real human bones, thereby ending the school's legacy prank where students steal Bonesy and choose a student to return it to the science closet without being caught by the faculty. Ham, the only Tobin who has never been "Bonesy-ed", finds himself chosen. His siblings recount their own moments of glory returning Bonesy, and agree to help him. Golovkin, the only teacher to never catch a student, catches Ham, but Ham reveals that his is a plastic Halloween decoration and that Bonesy is already in the closet, baffling Golovkin. Later, Ham explains that on the day of the announcement, he anticipated his siblings Bonesy-ing him and preemptively hid Bonesy in the closet under a tarp, replacing it with a decoy for his siblings to steal instead. Bonesy appears on their doorstep again, and they recognize that Golovkin wants another chance. Meanwhile, missing her father, Honeybee joins Beef for ice fishing. She becomes bored to tears and frustrated that they don't seem to be bonding. Beef admits that he hoped Honeybee would appreciate the serenity with him, as his children refuse to join him. Honeybee comes to appreciate Beef's perspective and catches an enormous fish, truly enjoying herself.

=== Season 5 (2024–25) ===
No. overall	No. in season	Title	Directed by	Written by	Original release date	Prod. code	U.S. viewers (millions)
76	1	"The Lies Aquatic Adventure"	Karen Hydendahl	Wendy Molyneux & Lizzie Molyneux-Logelin	December 22, 2024	5LBW01	0.59
Carissa takes Beef to a hotel for a romantic weekend, during which the family decides to clean and repair The Mighty Kathleen, which has broken down countless times. The boat seemingly is stolen overnight, leading to Moon, Wolf, and Judy to brainstorm fantastical reasons as to the boat's disappearance, so as to not upset Beef when he comes home. Honeybee suggests that it was time for the boat to be retired anyway, and convinces them to tell Beef the truth. Beef reveals that the boat had simply been sold and collected overnight, and he has purchased another used boat, The Canal Breeze (or because the 'C' has worn off, the anal Breeze).
77	2	"The Prince of Hides Adventure"	Damil Bryant	Anthony Gioe & Nick Mandernach	February 23, 2025	5LBW02	0.59
Wolf is cast in popular local survivalist reality show "Dropped Off to Die" to the elation of his family. Though he's skilled in survivalist knowledge, his inability to handle isolation causes him to be embarrassingly eliminated within 10 hours. Unable to face his family, he hides out at Cheesecake's in disguise as "Rick Drygoods" while trying to figure out how to hide the broadcast from his family, which will premiere in 6 days. He manages to sneak into their home and cut the satellite feed, but learns his family will join the entire town for a viewing at the town square. He plans to cut the town's power grid line, but is stopped by Beef. Beef, recognizing Wolf, tells him that regardless of his performance, he will always be a Tobin, and that by embracing his shame, he will lessen its power over him. Wolf addresses the crowd, revealing himself and his poor performance, but finds that his family and the town loved his episode anyway and that he has nothing to be ashamed of. Meanwhile, Honeybee introduces Dirt to margaritas.
78	3	"Bots on the Side Adventure"	Mario D'Anna	Caroline Levich	March 2, 2025	5LBW03	0.52
Ham becomes anxious with the seriousness of his relationship with Crispin. While at a birthday party at Yet-E-Cheddar, a children's entertainment restaurant, the singer of the animatronic robot band breaks down and Ham fills in. The owner hires him to sing with the other animatronic robots until the animatronic singer is repaired. Ham becomes attracted to the animatronic mascot, Yeti Van Halen, and fantasizes about kissing him. He confides in Dirt about his confusion surrounding Crispin and his newfound attraction. She encourages him to explore his feelings to understand what they're really telling him. Ham eventually kisses Yeti backstage and is caught by Crispin. He and Ham talk, recognizing that they love each other, but that Ham's attraction to Yeti is a manifestation of his desire to explore the dating world and discover more about himself, something Crispin admits to also feeling. They both amicably agree to take a break. Dirt leaves Ham a note, encouraging his new journey of self-discovery. Meanwhile, the Tobins encourage Beef to rename the (C)anal Breeze to something less embarrassing, but are wary of Beef's terrible naming habits. They all suggest their own ideas, but ultimately suggest renaming the ship to The Mighty Beef, to Beef's delight.
79	4	"Silence of the Dams Adventure"	Aimee Steinberger	Carlee Malemute	March 9, 2025	5LBW04	0.46
The Lone Moose Beaver Council, a mysterious trio, set up a large wooden effigy in tribute. Later, Honeybee, in an attempt to avoid a road closure, drives down a fire road and encounters the effigy, accidentally knocking it over with her car. She is then stalked by a mysterious entity. When it attacks her and chases her into the house, the other Tobins are shocked to learn of what she has unleashed: Steven Beaver, the most recent of a lineage of vindictive beavers that have plagued Lone Moose since its founding. The citizens, represented by the council, offer the beaver an effigy to use for its dam every year as an appeasement, but Honeybee's accident has angered it. Menaced by Steven, the Tobins hatch a plan with the assistance of the council. They lure Steven unto his dam and Honeybee and Beef then detach it with chainsaws, sending it and Steven down the river to Ted's Folly, in hopes that Steven will plague their town instead. Honeybee, now safe, retires to watch the Tobins play their favorite board game, while the mayor of Ted's Folly has a terrifying encounter with the newly arrived Steven.
80	5	"Bust a Moon Adventure"	Karen Hydendahl	Kevin Seccia	March 16, 2025	5LBW05	0.43
After being grounded by Beef, Moon utilizes an obscure Alaskan law to emancipate himself as an adult. Excited to now do whatever he wants, he rents a room from Delmer and has his friends party with him, but soon grows exhausted from the responsibility of curbing their outlandish behavior each night. Meanwhile, Judy and Ham seek some extra cash to purchase personal mini fridges, and opt to rent out Moon's old room. However, their client is a man seeking to break the world record for the longest continuous accordion set. He plays non-stop for over three days, driving Judy and Ham up the wall from lack of sleep. Beef orchestrated all these events to teach Moon, Judy, and Ham lessons about getting what they think they want. The next day, things have returned to normal and the family opt to spend the day together.
81	6	"Can't Hardly Debate Adventure"	Damil Bryant	Marina Cockenberg	March 23, 2025	5LBW06	0.49
Dirt infiltrates the school to flirt with the head lunch lady, Gloria. Principal Gibbons ignores her trespassing, as she never graduated when she was enrolled, and is technically still a student. He instead conscripts her as the coach for the debate team after seeing her argue down a student. Dirt agrees in exchange for being hired as a lunch lady, allowing her to continue spending time with Gloria. She teaches the students "workaround" tactics designed to win arguments irrespective of facts or reason. The students succeed, but during the debate finals, the opposing school has the team disqualified, since competition rules state that the coach must be a staff member, and Dirt is not an official employee. However, Judy finds rules that allow another student from the school to substitute in, and since Dirt is technically still a student, she is allowed to debate in their place. Though she has no experience with the debate topic, the students use her workaround techniques to fluster the opposing team offstage, and Dirt wins. She and Gloria go canoodle in celebration. Meanwhile, Wolf tries to evoke an awed "woah" from Beef, finally succeeding by accidentally setting off a fireworks display while slipping on some ice.
82	7	"It's Compli-skated Adventure"	Mario D'Anna	Asha Michelle Wilson	March 30, 2025	5LBW07	0.53
Preparing for the annual skating competition that she always wins with Moon, Judy is devastated when she overhears him say to Russell that he hates spending time with his loser sister. They get into an argument on the ice, betting they could each win with a terrible skater of the other's choosing. Moon chooses Russell, and Judy chooses Ham. Russell and Judy bond, with Russell filling the doting little brother role Judy misses from Moon. Moon becomes jealous and tries to end the bet, but Judy reveals that she overheard what he said. Wolf consoles Judy and reminds her that she did the same thing to him when she started getting older and that it's a part of growing up. Judy reconciles with Moon and they perform together, winning the competition. Meanwhile, Zelda returns with her new fiance, Ribeye, resulting in Beef agreeing to a duel to determine who gets Zelda. Beef intends to lose, hoping to be rid of Zelda, but winds up saving Ribeye when Zelda attempts to shoot him with an arrow to be with Beef. Zelda saves face, pretending she intended to save Ribeye and leaves with him, but tells Beef they plan to remain in Lone Moose.
83	8	"Ghouls Rush In Adventure"	Aimee Steinberger	Emily Heller	April 6, 2025	5LBW08	0.57
Wolf and Honeybee start a successful haunted boat tour using the ship with the family's help. When they hear controversial critic Alaska Alan (AKAlan) plans to review them, they restructure the tour to meet his very specific needs. However, the day of the visit, things go wrong: Wolf gives himself a debilitating concussion, Judy is locked inside the storage freezer, Ham's pastries spoil, and Beef falls asleep at the wheel. The disastrous events that unfold lead Alan to believe that the tour is really a set up for violent retribution against him for his history of critical reviews by disgruntled businesses. Terrified, he radios for the police, who intervene. In the aftermath, Wolf and Honeybee clear up things with Alan, and lament that their dream will probably end with his negative review. Alan points out that they're still young and shouldn't put too much pressure on themselves to have everything figured out in their 20s. The next day, they find that Alan has left them a positive review for his truly terrifying experience.
84	9	"Dial M for Moon-der Adventure"	Karen Hydendahl	Gabe Delahaye	April 13, 2025	5LBW09	0.48
The Tobins receive a phone call rescinding the announced school snow day. At school, the Tobins notice that only a handful of other students and teachers have made it in. Mrs. McNamara, as the acting principal, assigns them all tedious chores. Moon's suspicions that something is wrong are proven correct when the students find their lockers booby trapped and a DVD plays over the AV system showing embarrassing videos of those in attendance. He deduces that the phone call was doctored and sent to specific individuals to bring them to the school. Everyone has an alibi, but Moon notices inconsistencies in Judy's. Caught, she reveals that ruining their snow day is her revenge against each of them for unwittingly contributing to the circumstances that led her to embarrass herself last month by farting and belching in front of her tap dancing idol at a school event. However, Mrs. McNamara releases them all home to Judy's disappointment. Meanwhile, Honeybee, Wolf, and Marie, having heard that Beef and Carissa broke up a while ago, try to gently encourage him to admit it. He eventually relents, explaining that he wasn't falling to pieces like with Kathleen because he and Carissa broke up mutually and maturely, and the others are relieved at his emotional growth and healthy outlook.
85	10	"Ham to Lose a Guy Adventure"	Damil Bryant	Matt Lawton	April 27, 2025	5LBW10	0.53
Ham is depressed after Crispin gets a new boyfriend. Judy and Beef try to break him out of it through various activities, and finally by setting up a disastrous date with an overly complimentary guy, Ezra. To teach them a lesson, Ham begins dating the most obnoxious guy he can find on the dating apps, Kenzie, and brings him home to hang out. Kenzie is so terrible and conceited that Beef and Judy can't take it and end up apologizing to Ham, admitting that they wanted him to feel better for their own comfort, rather than allow him to process his feelings. Relieved, Ham matches Kenzie up with Ezra, and deals with his emotions by hanging out with Beef and Judy. Meanwhile, Mayor Peppers starts a rumor that Wolf eats worms to boost town morale and intrigue. Wolf's attempts to prove otherwise only further the townsfolk's beliefs in it, culminating in him accidentally eating a worm in front of the town in spite of himself.
86	11	"Dungeon Aunt Dragons Adventure"	Mario D'Anna	Jay Kasten	May 4, 2025	5LBW11	0.43
Dirt enjoys playing a tabletop role playing game with Moon, Russell, and Henry, and describes falling out with her childhood friends when she was 10. When Dirt is unavailable one day, the boys invite another student to fill in for her. Learning that they played without her, she is livid, and terrorizes them in revenge. Hoping to understand Dirt's reaction better, and remembering her previous falling out, they infiltrate her bunker and find a photo album with some boys' faces scribbled out. They find one of them, an old man named Joe, who is eager to reconnect with Dirt. Upon seeing him, Dirt reveals that they were all friends until her father forced her to stop playing with them because it was "unseemly" for a girl to play with boys. Dirt then found they had replaced her with another friend. However, Joe explains that he did that because he was heartbroken: he actually had a crush on Dirt, and when Dirt protested any romantic interest in the boys to her father, he was crushed. He apologizes, knowing he was foolish, and Dirt, relieved, explains that she's a lesbian anyway. The boys apologize and they all return to their game. Meanwhile, Beef and the other Tobins are seduced into buying beads from the bead store to make ridiculous crafts. Obsessed, they outfit the house with them, only for Dirt and Moon to cause the delicate crafts to shatter, sending beads everywhere.
87	12	"Jude-night Run Adventure"	Karen Hydendahl	Caroline Levich	May 11, 2025	5LBW13	0.53
The Tobins celebrate Honeybee's birthday at Le Fancy, an exclusive French restaurant in New Fork. They observe the 3 hour waiting time due to the strict full party policy. Judy steps out, secretly purchasing a weasel. Wolf follows her to get her to come back, but Judy avoids him, taking the train back to Lone Moose. Wolf catches up with her. She explains that the weasel is a bribe for Ms. McNamara (whose pet weasel recently died), hoping she will write a recommendation letter for a European arts program Judy hopes to attend. Wolf insists she return to celebrate his wife's birthday. Judy responds by criticizing Wolf for living a small life that never left Lone Moose compared to her own big dreams. Wolf angrily defends his life built around his wife and family, returning to New Fork alone. Humbled, Judy gives Ms. McNamara the weasel as a gift instead, and makes it back in time, apologizing to Wolf and joining the meal. Meanwhile, Honeybee holds a reality show-style contest among other waiting parties of two, anticipating that Wolf and Judy may not return in time, to select who will replace them and join her and the other Tobins.
88	13	"Sunset Beeflevard Adventure"	Aimee Steinberger	Anthony Gioe & Nick Mandermach	May 29, 2025	5LBW12	0.54
Judy, having put in her time as the swing for a popular Italian dinner theater production, gets her big break when the actress for the older Aunt Marie is injured. Beef is horrified when he realizes that the dramedy is also interactive, due to being tongue-tied and humiliated once in an interactive show by a stand-up comic. Judy urges the company to call on Beef to help him get past his trauma, and his improvised one-liner in the performance becomes such a hit that he is eventually invited to join the cast. Judy is incensed that Beef's single line has upstaged her and the time she spent earning her spot. She improvises a moving performance based on Aunt Marie's tragic backstory, excoriating the cheap laughs of Beef's line, and earning the audience and the company's respect. Beef apologizes to her and she forgives him. She later writes her own play and Beef helps her run lines. Meanwhile, Wolf and Honeybee help Moon lie to garner sympathy and sales for his Little Preppers' fundraiser. A kidnapping lie goes too far and Chief Edna is called in by a concerned citizen. She admonishes them for lying, but helps them sell even more elsewhere.
89	14	"Reservoir Dad Adventure"	Damil Bryant	Drew Hanks	June 5, 2025	5LBW14	0.40
Beef loses his passion for fishing and encounters a group of "stunt fishers", led by the charismatic lady duo, Lemmons and Limes. He leaves his job to join them, and settles into their hedonistic lifestyle, learning how they dive and catch fish with their mouths, while also enjoying some romantic intrigue with Lemmons and Limes. However, he is shocked when he discovers that they are secretly exotic fish smugglers, having stolen some warm water fish from a nearby aquarium. He secretly informs Chief Edna and her sister, who send Beef back in for a sting operation when they hand the fish off to a buyer. Beef is exposed, and Lemmons and Limes dump the fish into ocean to hide the evidence. To save the warm water fish from dying of exposure in the cold Alaskan ocean, Beef dives in and catches each of them with his mouth, rediscovering his passion for fishing and appreciation for marine life. Lemmons and Limes escape, but Beef contacts them later to thank them for helping him find his joy again. Meanwhile, during Beef's absence, Aunt Dirt attempts to name a replacement captain among the Tobins.
90	15	"MIB: Men in Belts Adventure"	Neil Graf	Carlee Malemute	June 12, 2025	5LBW15	0.54
Beef and Walt bond over their shared boring hobbies, to the delight of both of their families. However, when Beef's favorite belt goes missing, Judy soon discovers that Walt has stolen it. When Beef confirms this to be true, Walt insists it's his belt and their budding best friendship is ended. The kids conspire to get them to resolve their issues by tying them up together. Walt explains that the belt really is his: years ago, Kathleen stole it from him and gifted it to Beef for his birthday, and he didn't know how to tell Beef without ruining their friendship. Beef recognizes that it truly belongs to him, and makes up with Walt, and the two continue their friendship. Meanwhile, Honeybee and Wolf team up with the Tuntleys when their mutual dinner date friends, the Puckbottoms, are scamming both of them to get free meals. Their plan to ambush the Puckbottoms and force them into paying for all six of their meals during a dinner fails, and the Puckbottoms leave. However, the four of them realize they have forged a strong couple friendship along the way and make plans to hang out again.
91	16	"Super Smash Lovers Adventure"	Aimee Steinberger	Matt Lawton	June 19, 2025	5LBW16	0.39
Honeybee secretly is becoming annoyed with Wolf's living habits, and the couple agree to make efforts to make space. Worried that she and Wolf will grow to resent each other after talking to Junkyard Kyle about her ex-husbands, Honeybee decides to take it upon herself to expand the guest cabin even further by taking out a wall. When a wild wolf breaks into the house and the couple hide, Honeybee confesses her feelings, and Wolf admits he sometimes gets annoyed with her habits too. Beef rescues the two from the wolf, and assures them it's normal for loving couples to get annoyed with each other, and assists them in expanding the guest cabin. Meanwhile, Beef purchases his future coffin, disconcerting Judy, Ham, and Moon. Moon seems to achieve enlightenment after laying in the coffin, becoming a zen guru. Judy, terrified at the prospect of death, self soothes by becoming Moon's disciple. Ham, fearing he hasn't truly lived life, finds common ground with Mr. Golovkin. After Ham disrupts an assembly at school by accidentally crashing Mr. Golovkin's car, the siblings realize the way they originally had been living their lives was more fulfilling.
92	17	"Serendipi-Beef Adventure"	Karen Hydendahl	Marina Cockenberg	June 19, 2025	5LBW17	0.43
Alaska's "kissing comets" return after 23 years, causing the townsfolk to hurry to scenic vistas to kiss under the comets with their loved ones, which will, according to legend, tie the lovers' souls together forever. Moon plans to kiss Quinn, but Beef objects, remembering that he kissed Kathleen under the comets and all the misery she brought him. While searching for Moon, he encounters his past flames, but flees in terror. Moon tells Beef directly that his experience with Kathleen was largely due to red flags he chose to ignore. Moon asks Quinn to kiss him and go out with him, and she agrees. Beef realizes that Moon is right and joyfully goes to enjoy all the romantic opportunities life is presenting him. He runs into Alyson and they consummate their romantic feelings with a kiss. Meanwhile, Dirt thinks Honeybee and Wolf have dumped her at a local retirement home when their car breaks down and the couple disappears. However, she begins to warm to the place. Honeybee and Wolf reappear, explaining that they were simply waiting outside for the tow truck and would never abandon Dirt here, especially because they cannot afford the retirement home's prices.
93	18	"Heelraiser Adventure"	Damil Bryant	Kevin Seccia	July 17, 2025	5LBW18	0.40
Beef is frustrated with Wolf's antics aboard the boat, and Wolf is hurt when he overhears Beef wishing he could replace him. Wolf quits and joins a pro wrestling league and eventually comes up with a villainous "heel" character: The Bad Dad, modeled after Beef. Beef's feelings are hurt, but he tries to support Wolf to demonstrate his love for him. When the entire town begins associating Bad Dad's antics with the reality of Beef's parenting, Beef has enough and enters the ring. He and Wolf hash out their issues in the rink—Beef wants Wolf to shape up and be reliable on the boat, but would never replace his son; Wolf wants Beef to voice criticisms to his face—and they make up. Meanwhile, Judy finds Mr. Golovkin is the new trainee at the photo store, and learns that he is undercover trying to steal back his train caboose from the mall's current novelty train conductor.
94	19	"Anchor Ham Adventure"	Mario D'Anna	Asha Michelle Wilson	August 14, 2025	5LBW19	0.49
For their school internships, Ham is assigned to one of his idols, weatherman Harry Hotfog, while Judy is reluctantly assigned as troop leader for Moon's Little Preppers. Though Judy wants the kids to put on Macbeth, she is annoyed that the Preppers keep diverting to help their "king", Principle Gibbons, track down potential saboteurs. She is pleasantly surprised to find that in spite of their seemingly frivolous tasks, the Preppers have also built a full set and learned their lines for the play in time for the performance. Meanwhile, Ham lives out Macbeth himself, becoming increasingly subsumed by his own ambition and obsession with the weather. He grows closer to Harry by sabotaging other station workers, until he eventually supplants Harry himself by exploiting his dairy allergy while preparing Harry's coffee. It escalates to Ham dueling with Harry live on air, until Harry realizes that he had temporarily lost his passion for the job and Ham apologizes for being blinded by his own ambition.
95	20	"Cakeleration of Judependence"	Aimee Steinberger	Emily Heller	September 7, 2025	5LBW20	0.40
Judy is running a campaign for a yearbook superlative 'Most Talented', and plans the family summer trip to Maple World, making everyone promise to keep their schedules open for the one free week they all have. The trip is put at risk when Ham forgot to do all of his school assignments, the consequence being summer school. Determined, Judy recruits Moon and Aunt Dirt to finish it all in one night, not wanting to tell Beef about their cheating and get the trip cancelled. Ham gets distracted from work and makes a cake for fun, causing Judy to admonish him and everyone else for taking her for planning for granted. Realizing how much Judy has been doing for her family, Beef gets everyone to lock in on the task at hand. They manage to complete all of Ham's assignments and Ham thanks Judy by rigging the votes for "Most Talented" in her favor. The family ultimately makes it to their trip to Maple World. Meanwhile, Honeybee plucks Wolf's eyebrows too much, creating a visibly angry expression. They decide to use it when it intimidates others, hoping to not be taken advantage of anymore. They accidentally anger and threaten many people, leading to Wolf being arrested and having his eyebrows shaved off to solve the issue.
96	21	"Into the Russell-verse"	Karen Hydendahl	Gabe Delahaye	September 14, 2025	5LBW21	0.98
Moon goes to Russell's house for a sleepover, excited because Russell's gentle personality allows him to do whatever he wants. His plans are stymied by the presence of Russell's younger cousin, also named Russell, who uses his seemingly frail persona to manipulate Russell into doing what he wants instead. When Moon and Cousin Russell argue, they let slip that they only enjoy sleepovers with Russell for their own selfish aims. Russell is hurt, but Moon and Cousin Russell make amends with one another, realizing that they specifically like doing things with Russell, and apologize to him. The three have a fun time toilet papering a tree together. Meanwhile, the remaining Tobins all catch the 24-hour Mariner Flu, causing them to hallucinate and behave erratically. They shoot and send out a birthday video for one of Honeybee and Wolf's multimedia clients, but are horrified the next day to discover that the video is a 7-hour chronicle of their addlepated delusions.
97	22	"It's a Beef-derful Life"	Damil Bryant	Wendy Molyneux & Lizzie Molyneux-Logelin	September 14, 2025	5LBW22	0.75
In a celebrated town tradition, Beef is selected to bring a moose carcass back to Lone Moose to be harvested for its meat. Beef is excited to be a town hero, despite his smaller acts of kindness, like shoveling Londra's driveway, for which she gives him a musical thank you greeting card. However, while attempting to retrieve it from snow bank, Beef and the moose carcass slip off a cliff and Beef is pinned underneath, unconscious. While the town searches for him, Beef is visited by Denny the Snowflake, who takes him back through his life's most important moments, showing him that being a big hero isn't as important as all the small things he's done to help the town. He awakens but is unable to call for help. He is able to open Londra's card and the townsfolk hear it and are able to rescue him. The townsfolk celebrate Beef by bringing him various meats, and the Tobins plan an impromptu party. Beef stares at the sky and expresses appreciation for the Alaskan wilderness, as he did in the pilot episode. The series ends with Judy's imaginary friend Alanis Morissette singing "Thank U" while the credits show various scenes from the show's previous episodes.

== Ratings ==
=== Season 1 ===
Viewership and ratings per episode of List of The Great North episodes
No.	Title	Air date	Rating (18–49)	Viewers (millions)	DVR (18–49)	DVR viewers (millions)	Total (18–49)	Total viewers (millions)
1	"Sexi Moose Adventure"	January 3, 2021	0.7	2.34	TBD	TBD	TBD	TBD
2	"Feast of Not People Adventure"	January 17, 2021	2.1	6.10	TBD	TBD	TBD	TBD
3	"Avocado Barter Adventure"	February 21, 2021	0.4	1.16	TBD	TBD	TBD	TBD
4	"Romantic Meat-Based Adventure"	February 28, 2021	0.3	0.97	TBD	TBD	TBD	TBD
5	"Curl Interrupted Adventure"	March 7, 2021	0.4	1.05	TBD	TBD	TBD	TBD
6	"Pride & Prejudance Adventure"	March 14, 2021	0.4	1.12	TBD	TBD	TBD	TBD
7	"Period Piece Adventure"	March 21, 2021	0.4	0.92	TBD	TBD	TBD	TBD
8	"Keep Beef-Lievin Adventure"	April 11, 2021	0.4	1.03	TBD	TBD	TBD	TBD
9	"Tusk in the Wind Adventure"	April 18, 2021	0.3	0.94	TBD	TBD	TBD	TBD
10	"Game of Snownes Adventure"	May 9, 2021	0.3	0.84	0.1	0.13	0.4	0.96
11	"My Fart Will Go on Adventure"	May 16, 2021	0.3	0.81	0.1	0.17	0.4	0.98

=== Season 2 ===
Viewership and ratings per episode of List of The Great North episodes
No.	Title	Air date	Rating (18–49)	Viewers (millions)	DVR (18–49)	DVR viewers (millions)	Total (18–49)	Total viewers (millions)
1	"Brace/Off Adventure"	September 26, 2021	0.7	1.85	TBD	TBD	TBD	TBD
2	"The Great Punkin' Adventure"	October 3, 2021	0.4	0.99	TBD	TBD	TBD	TBD
3	"The Yawn of the Dead Adventure"	October 10, 2021	0.8	1.99	TBD	TBD	TBD	TBD
4	"Wanted: Delmer Alive Adventure"	October 17, 2021	0.4	1.05	TBD	TBD	TBD	TBD
5	"Beef's Craig Beef Adventure"	October 24, 2021	0.4	1.17	TBD	TBD	TBD	TBD
6	"Skidmark Holmes Adventure"	November 7, 2021	0.6	1.69	TBD	TBD	TBD	TBD
7	"Tasteful Noods Adventure"	November 14, 2021	0.3	1.03	TBD	TBD	TBD	TBD
8	"Good Beef Hunting Adventure"	November 21, 2021	0.7	2.15	0.0	0.11	0.7	2.25
9	"From Tusk Til Dawn Adventure"	November 28, 2021	0.6	1.81	0.1	0.17	0.7	1.98
10	"Dip the Halls Adventure"	December 19, 2021	0.6	1.92	TBD	TBD	TBD	TBD
11	"Dances with Wolfs Adventure"	January 2, 2022	0.4	1.35	TBD	TBD	TBD	TBD
12	"Beef Mommas House Adventure"	February 27, 2022	0.3	0.94	TBD	TBD	TBD	TBD
13	"Saved by the Spells Adventure"	March 6, 2022	0.3	1.08	TBD	TBD	TBD	TBD
14	"Stools Rush in Adventure"	March 13, 2022	0.2	0.79	TBD	TBD	TBD	TBD
15	"You've Got Math Adventure"	March 20, 2022	0.3	0.78	TBD	TBD	TBD	TBD
16	"As Goldie as It Gets Adventure"	March 27, 2022	0.3	0.82	TBD	TBD	TBD	TBD
17	"Dead Moon Walking Adventure"	April 10, 2022	0.3	0.77	TBD	TBD	TBD	TBD
18	"Beef's in Toyland Adventure"	April 24, 2022	0.2	0.75	TBD	TBD	TBD	TBD
19	"Poetry of the Penals Adventure"	May 1, 2022	0.3	0.75	TBD	TBD	TBD	TBD
20	"Say It Again, Ham Adventure"	May 8, 2022	0.2	0.71	TBD	TBD	TBD	TBD
21	"Slide & Wet-Judice Adventure"	May 15, 2022	0.3	0.83	TBD	TBD	TBD	TBD
22	"Papa Don't Fiend Adventure"	May 22, 2022	0.2	0.69	TBD	TBD	TBD	TBD

=== Season 3 ===
Viewership and ratings per episode of List of The Great North episodes
No.	Title	Air date	Rating (18–49)	Viewers (millions)	DVR (18–49)	DVR viewers (millions)	Total (18–49)	Total viewers (millions)
1	"A Knife to Remember Adventure"	September 25, 2022	0.8	2.13	TBD	TBD	TBD	TBD
2	"Cillian Me Softly Adventure"	October 2, 2022	0.4	1.09	TBD	TBD	TBD	TBD
3	"Autumn If You Got Em Adventure"	October 9, 2022	0.7	2.04	TBD	TBD	TBD	TBD
4	"Code Enough Said Adventure"	October 16, 2022	0.3	0.94	0.0	0.07	0.3	1.01
5	"Woodfellas Adventure"	October 23, 2022	0.6	1.82	0.0	0.09	0.6	1.90
6	"Blood Actually Adventure"	October 30, 2022	0.7	1.96	0.1	0.11	0.7	2.07
7	"Mall-mento Adventure"	November 13, 2022	0.7	2.18	TBD	TBD	TBD	TBD
8	"Dick, Rick, Groom Adventure"	November 20, 2022	0.3	0.92	TBD	TBD	TBD	TBD
9	"Bee's All That Adventure"	November 27, 2022	0.3	0.97	TBD	TBD	TBD	TBD
10	"Xmas with the Skanks Adventure"	December 11, 2022	0.5	1.82	TBD	TBD	TBD	TBD
11	"Arranger-ous Minds Adventure"	January 1, 2023	0.2	0.69	TBD	TBD	TBD	TBD
12	"Enough Bed Adventure"	February 19, 2023	0.3	0.94	TBD	TBD	TBD	TBD
13	"Sister Pact Too Adventure"	February 26, 2023	0.2	0.72	TBD	TBD	TBD	TBD
14	"Boy Meats World Adventure"	March 5, 2023	0.2	0.67	TBD	TBD	TBD	TBD
15	"Can't Hardly Date Adventure"	March 12, 2023	0.2	0.65	TBD	TBD	TBD	TBD
16	"Great Bus of Choir Adventure"	March 19, 2023	0.2	0.64	TBD	TBD	TBD	TBD
17	"A Bear-tiful Find Adventure"	April 16, 2023	0.2	0.63	TBD	TBD	TBD	TBD
18	"Pa-shank Redemption Adventure"	April 23, 2023	0.3	0.76	TBD	TBD	TBD	TBD
19	"Rear Genius Adventure"	April 30, 2023	0.2	0.66	TBD	TBD	TBD	TBD
20	"Barrel Be Blood Adventure"	May 7, 2023	0.2	0.59	TBD	TBD	TBD	TBD
21	"For Whom the Smell Tolls Adventure: Part One"	May 14, 2023	0.2	0.61	TBD	TBD	TBD	TBD
22	"For Whom the Smell Tolls Part Two"	May 21, 2023	0.2	0.65	TBD	TBD	TBD	TBD

=== Season 4 ===
Viewership and ratings per episode of List of The Great North episodes
No.	Title	Air date	Rating (18–49)	Viewers (millions)
1	"Bad Speecher Adventure"	January 7, 2024	0.2	0.81
2	"Risky Beefness Adventure"	February 18, 2024	0.1	0.45
3	"Aunt Misbehavin' Adventure"	February 25, 2024	0.1	0.44
4	"Ready Mayor Won Adventure"	March 3, 2024	0.1	0.47
5	"Cheese All That Adventure"	March 10, 2024	0.2	0.59
6	"The Mighty Pucks Adventure"	March 17, 2024	0.1	0.48
7	"Judy Presents: The Staircake"	March 24, 2024	0.1	0.51
8	"Bear of Beeftown Adventure"	April 7, 2024	0.1	0.47
9	"Idita-Ruth Adventure"	April 14, 2024	0.2	0.55
10	"A Chug's Life Adventure"	April 14, 2024	0.2	0.49
11	"High Expectations Adventure"	April 21, 2024	0.2	0.59
12	"Any Court in a Storm Adventure"	April 28, 2024	0.1	0.39
13	"You've Got Sail Adventure"	May 5, 2024	0.2	0.52
14	"Doctor? No! Adventure"	May 12, 2024	0.1	0.47
15	"Fifty Worst Dates Adventure"	May 19, 2024	0.2	0.49
16	"Excess Cabbage Adventure"	September 1, 2024	0.1	0.49
17	"Welcome to Miami Adventure"	September 8, 2024	0.3	1.16
18	"Worst Drives Club Adventure"	September 8, 2024	0.2	0.88
19	"Look Who's Squawking Adventure"	September 15, 2024	0.2	0.59
20	"Am I the Ice Hole? Adventure"	September 15, 2024	0.1	0.56

=== Season 5 ===
Viewership and ratings per episode of List of The Great North episodes
No.	Title	Air date	Rating (18–49)	Viewers (millions)
1	"The Lies Aquatic Adventure"	December 22, 2024	0.2	0.59
2	"The Prince of Hides Adventure"	February 23, 2025	0.2	0.59
3	"Bots on the Side Adventure"	March 2, 2025	0.1	0.52
4	"Silence of the Dams Adventure"	March 9, 2025	0.1	0.46
5	"Bust a Moon Adventure"	March 16, 2025	0.1	0.43
6	"Can't Hardly Debate Adventure"	March 23, 2025	0.1	0.49
7	"It's Compli-skated Adventure"	March 30, 2025	0.1	0.53
8	"Ghouls Rush In Adventure"	April 6, 2025	0.1	0.57
9	"Dial M for Moon-der Adventure"	April 13, 2025	0.1	0.48
10	"Ham to Lose a Guy Adventure"	April 27, 2025	0.2	0.53
11	"Dungeon Aunt Dragons Adventure"	May 4, 2025	0.1	0.43
12	"Jude-night Run Adventure"	May 11, 2025	0.2	0.53
13	"Sunset Beeflevard Adventure"	May 29, 2025	0.2	0.54
14	"Reservoir Dad Adventure"	June 5, 2025	0.1	0.40
15	"MIB: Men in Belts Adventure"	June 12, 2025	0.2	0.54
16	"Super Smash Lovers Adventure"	June 19, 2025	0.1	0.39
17	"Serendipi-Beef Adventure"	June 19, 2025	0.1	0.43
18	"Heelraiser Adventure"	July 17, 2025	0.1	0.40
19	"Anchor Ham Adventure"	August 14, 2025	0.1	0.49
20	"Cakeleration of Judependence"	September 7, 2025	0.1	0.40
21	"Into the Russell-verse"	September 14, 2025	0.3	0.98
22	"It's a Beef-derful Life"	September 14, 2025	0.2	0.75

The Great North : U.S. viewers per episode (millions)

Season	Episode number																					
Season	1	2	3	4	5	6	7	8	9	10	11	12	13	14	15	16	17	18	19	20	21	22
1	2.34	6.10	1.16	0.97	1.05	1.12	0.92	1.03	0.94	0.84	0.81	–										
2	1.85	0.99	1.99	1.05	1.17	1.69	1.03	2.15	1.81	1.92	1.35	0.94	1.08	0.79	0.78	0.82	0.77	0.75	0.75	0.71	0.83	0.69
3	2.13	1.09	2.04	0.94	1.82	1.96	2.18	0.92	0.97	1.82	0.69	0.94	0.72	0.67	0.65	0.64	0.63	0.76	0.66	0.59	0.61	0.65
4	0.81	0.45	0.44	0.47	0.59	0.48	0.51	0.47	0.55	0.49	0.59	0.39	0.52	0.47	0.49	0.49	1.16	0.88	0.59	0.56	–	
5	0.59	0.59	0.52	0.46	0.43	0.49	0.53	0.57	0.48	0.53	0.43	0.53	0.54	0.40	0.54	0.39	0.43	0.40	0.49	0.40	0.98	0.75

Audience measurement performed by Nielsen Media Research
