= Kashana Cauley =

American comedy writer

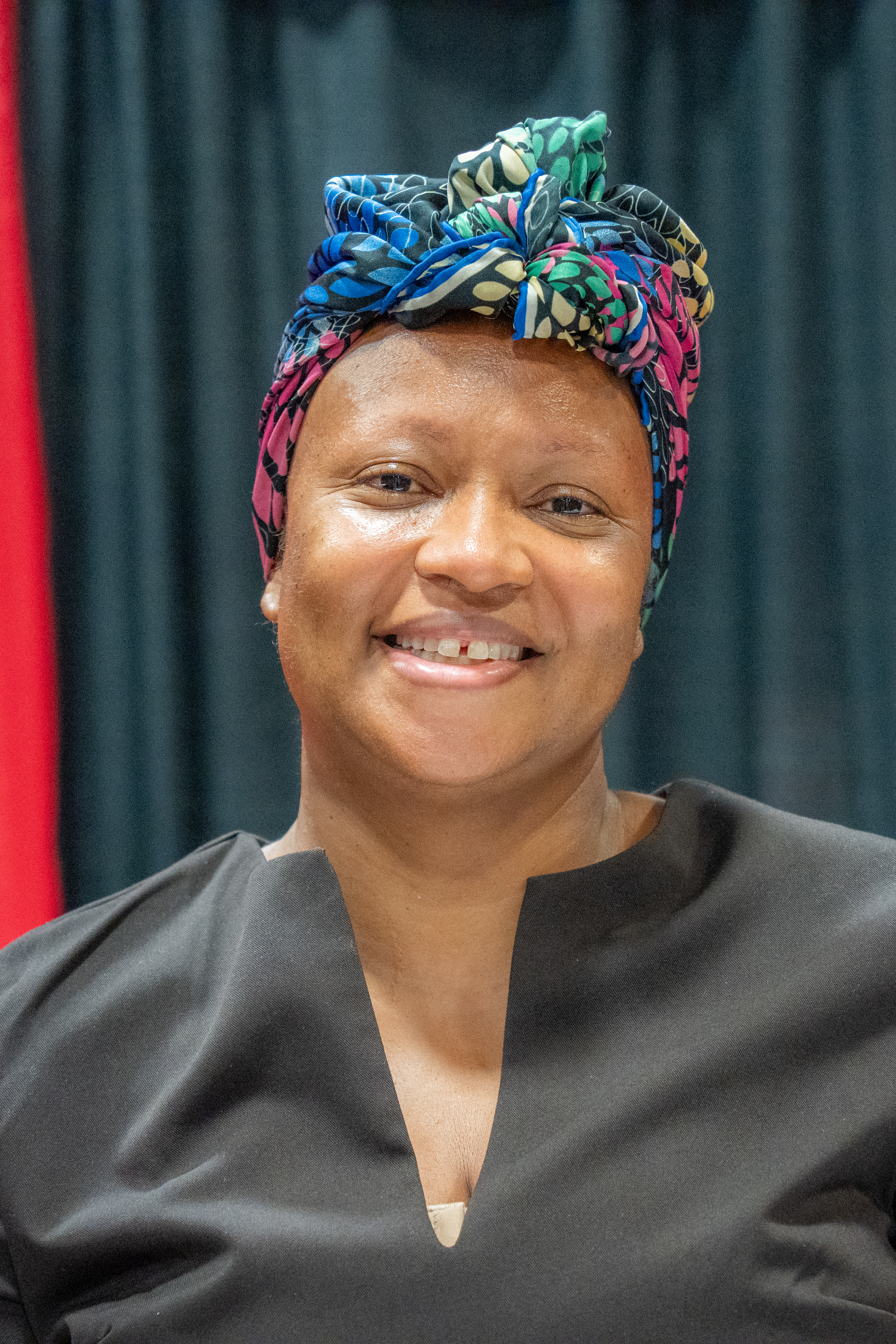
Cauley at the National Book Festival 2025

Kashana Cauley is an American writer. She was a writer for the Fox animated series The Great North as well as a former staff writer for The Daily Show with Trevor Noah. She is also a former contributing opinion writer for The New York Times, and has written for The Atlantic, Esquire, The New Yorker, Pitchfork, and Rolling Stone, among other publications, as well as for Pod Save America on HBO. Cauley's debut novel The Survivalists (2023) was longlisted for the 2023 Center for Fiction First Novel Prize.

== Life and career ==
Originally from Madison, Wisconsin, Cauley is a former Midtown antitrust lawyer and Brooklyn, New York resident, leaving that profession to pursue a career in comedy and social commentary. She currently resides in Los Angeles, California.

In 2016, Cauley published an article in The Atlantic about her experience with the anti-vaccination movement in the 1990s, after which she began to receive requests to write about other topics, and received a request to write for the Daily Show, where she was nominated for a WGA Award. Her satire focuses on systemic injustice and problems with American life and society.

In January 2023, Cauley published her debut novel, The Survivalists, which received a Winter/Spring 2023 Indies Introduce adult selection and a January 2023 Indie Next List selection. The Survivalists was favorably reviewed by The New York Times, The Boston Globe, and The Wall Street Journal. It was named a Best Book of 2023 by The Today Show, Vogue, Marie Claire, Harper’s Bazaar, Kirkus, and BBC. It was longlisted for the 2023 Center for Fiction First Novel Prize.

In July 2025, Cauley published her second novel, The Payback, about a group of Black mall employees who stage a heist against the student loan industry.

== Publications ==
- The Survivalists, Soft Skull Press. January 2023. ISBN 978-1-59376-727-3.
- The Payback, Atria Books. July 2025. ISBN 9781668075531.
