= The Great North =

American animated sitcom

- Genre: Animated sitcom
- Created by: Lizzie Molyneux-Logelin Wendy Molyneux; Minty Lewis
- Voices of: Nick Offerman; Jenny Slate; Will Forte; Dulcé Sloan; Paul Rust; Aparna Nancherla; Megan Mullally; Alanis Morissette; Jane Lynch
- Theme music composer: Wendy Molyneux; Lizzie Molyneux-Logelin; Minty Lewis; Tim Dacey; Patrick Dacey
- Composers: John Kimbrough; Scott Seiver
- Country of origin: United States
- Original language: English
- No. of seasons: 5
- No. of episodes: 97 (list of episodes)

Production
- Executive producers: Wendy Molyneux; Lizzie Molyneux-Logelin; Minty Lewis; Loren Bouchard; Janelle Momary-Neely; Joel Kuwahara; Dana Tafoya-Cameron
- Producers: Caroline Levich; Gabe Delahaye; Ted Travelstead; Kevin Seccia; Marina Cockenberg; Anthony Gioe & Nick Mandernach
- Editor: Dan Earley
- Running time: 22 minutes
- Production companies: Double Molyneux Sister Sheux; Wilo Productions; Fox Entertainment; 20th Television (season 1); 20th Television Animation (seasons 2–5)

Original release
- Network: Fox
- Release: January 3, 2021 – September 14, 2025

Related
- Bob's Burgers; Central Park

The Great North is an American animated sitcom created by Wendy Molyneux, Lizzie Molyneux, and Minty Lewis that aired on Fox over five seasons, from January 3, 2021 to September 14, 2025. The series features the voices of Nick Offerman, Jenny Slate, Will Forte, Dulcé Sloan, Paul Rust, and Aparna Nancherla.

In June 2020, the series was renewed for a second season ahead of its premiere. In May 2021, the series was renewed for a third season after airing its first-season finale. The second season premiered on September 26, 2021. The third season premiered on September 25, 2022. In August 2022, Fox renewed the series for a fourth season, which premiered on January 7, 2024. In January 2024, series co-creator Wendy Molyneux revealed that the show was renewed for a fifth season. The fifth and final season premiered on December 22, 2024 and concluded on September 14, 2025. The series was canceled in October 2025.

== Plot ==
Beef Tobin is a single father living in the fictional town of Lone Moose, Alaska with his four children Wolf, Ham, Judy, and Moon, as well as Wolf's wife Honeybee. Beef's life is centered on raising his children and keeping the family together. He is sometimes overbearing and smothering, but his deep love for his family is a central theme in each episode in the series.

== Voice cast ==
The main characters of The Great North (clockwise from top): Honeybee Shaw, Alanis Morissette, Judy Tobin, Wolf Tobin, Moon Tobin, Beef Tobin, and Ham Tobin

=== Main ===
- Nick Offerman as Beef Tenderloin Tobin, a fisherman and divorced father of four. Beef is still coming to terms with being abandoned by his ex-wife Kathleen. He spent years pretending that she died tragically, despite all of the Tobin children knowing the truth. He is a supportive father who encourages his children to love and respect others, although he sometimes struggles with the many changes happening in their lives and worries that they will grow apart.
- Jenny Slate as Judy Tobin, an artistically inclined sixteen-year-old and Beef's only daughter. Judy loves her family, sharing a deep bond with her "Alaskan twin" brother Ham (they are not actual twins, but were born 9 months apart). She dreams of exploring the world beyond their small, remote hometown. In the season 5 episode "Jude-Night Run Adventure", her middle name is revealed to be "Trudy".
- Will Forte as Wolf Tobin, Beef's oldest son and Honeybee's husband. A sensitive and optimistic young man, Wolf longs to make his father proud, although his eagerness often puts him beyond his depth. In the season 5 episode "Bots on the Side Adventure", Wolf says his middle name is "Giggles", which is revealed to be Beef's default choice for anything he has to name.
- Dulcé Sloan as Honeybee Shaw-Tobin, Wolf's wife. Confident and adventurous, she moved from her hometown of Fresno after falling in love with Wolf, and is now adapting to life in a small Alaskan fishing town. Honeybee adds dimension to the Tobin family, encouraging them to try new things and move a little faster. She also brings a skeptical curiosity to the traditions of Lone Moose–traditions such as “group soup” (Season 2, Episode 15, "You’ve Got Math Adventure"). Honeybee and Wolf share an obsession with movies and pop-culture. Their wedding was even Titanic-themed. As a young couple, they are often pitching entrepreneurial ideas based on the latest media trends (documentaries, podcasts, Shark Tank).
- Paul Rust as Ham Tobin, Beef's middle son. Ham is openly gay, which his family embraces. He shares a deep bond with his "Alaskan twin" sister Judy, and they often collaborate on creative endeavors. He enjoys baking, and secretly becomes the town's "cake lady" after the previous one was arrested. He is the lead singer of Messengers of Chaos, Lone Moose's first punk band. In the season 3 episode "Boy Meats World Adventure", Ham's middle name is revealed to be "Piercebrosnan".
- Aparna Nancherla as Moon Tobin, Beef's youngest son, who shares Beef's stoic demeanor and passion for outdoorsmanship. Despite being only 10 years old, Moon is unafraid of the intimidating Alaskan wildlife, and is often seen building traps for various animals (from ruffed grouse to Bigfoot) or exploring the wilderness around the family home. Moon wears a bear-like onesie almost all the time, even to school. In the season 5 episode "Bust a Moon Adventure", his full first name is revealed to be "Moonathan".

=== Recurring ===
- Kevin Avery as Jarvis Dufraine, the manager of the Lone Moose Mall.
- Tim Bagley as Dwayne Gibbons, the principal of Lone Moose School.
- Sarah Baker as Police Chief Edna, the chief of police in Lone Moose, who also owns the town boatyard and a sticker store.
- Paget Brewster as Mary Anderson, a teacher at Lone Moose School who is dating Mr. Golovkin.
- Nicole Byer as Coach Kiely, a gym teacher at Lone Moose School who also leads a support group for children of divorced parents.
- Wyatt Cenac as Ted Folly IV, the mayor of the nearby town of Ted's Folly.
- Sean Clements as John Johnson, editor of the town's newspaper, the Lone Moose Wind.
- Michael Coleman as Jim Tuntley, the father of Moon's friend Henry and husband of Dorothy Tuntley.
- Eugene Cordero as Craig Ptarmigan, a materialistic fisherman in Lone Moose. He is antagonistic toward Beef, his former best friend, after Beef made a joke at Craig's expense at a party when they were 18, preventing Craig from asking out Beef's eventual ex-wife Kathleen.
- Andy Daly as Cheesecake, Wolf's long-time best friend, whose polite, cheerful and mild-mannered behaviour belies his hard-partying lifestyle and extreme alcoholism; and Pete, the chipper but naive cashier at the Val-U-Buy.
- Gabe Delahaye as Old Jody Jr., a sketchy, raspy-voiced resident of Lone Moose who claims to be able to get anything for anyone.
- Rob Delaney as Brian Tobin, Beef's elder brother. Brian moved to Anchorage and works as a hot-tub and jacuzzi salesman. He has a daughter, Becca, about the same age as Ham and Judy.
- Ray Dewilde (credited in seasons 1 and 2 as Ray J. Dewilde) as Mayor Peppers, the mayor of Lone Moose and a member of the Sugpiaq tribe.
- Brooke Dillman as Zoya, a resident of Lone Moose with an Eastern European accent who works at the Russian Restaurant; Dell, a fisherwoman and sometime romantic interest of Beef's; and Gloria, the head lunch lady at Lone Moose School and Aunt Dirt's romantic interest.
- John Early as Henry Tuntley, a friend of Moon's who wears a sweater-vest and glasses.
- Guy Fieri as Guy Fieri, a version of the famous chef and television host who shows up in Honeybee's fantasies. Honeybee has a similar relationship with her idea of Guy Fieri that Judy has with her imaginary version of Alanis Morrisette.
- Jo Firestone as Greta Meatweep, a soft-spoken and ailment-riddled poetess who is an occasional romantic interest of Beef's.
- Grace Freud as Maude, the owner of Maude's All-Day Diner.
- Ziwe Fumudoh (credited as Ziwe) as Amelia, a friend of Judy's who works part-time at her mother's pizzeria, DiGigantico's Pizza. Amelia's mother used to home-school her, until she found the math lessons too difficult.
- Ron Funches as Jerrybee "Jerry" Shaw, Honeybee's friendly younger brother who first appears in flashbacks in the third episode, "Avocado Barter Adventure". Jerry moves to Lone Moose in the eighth episode, "Keep Beef-lievin' Adventure", and gets a job making public appearances in a Bigfoot mascot costume.
- Daniele Gaither as Ruth Shaw, Honeybee's mother, who owns a curtain store in Fresno with her husband Louis.
- John Gemberling as Russell, a friend of Moon's and fellow member of the Junior Janitors and the Li'l Preppers. He frequently talks about how much he likes and admires his mom's boyfriend Jamie.
- Patti Harrison as Deborah “Debbie” Van, a bratty frenemy of Moon's who is into figure skating. Her last name was given as "Gladu" in her first appearance in the episode "Keep Beef-lievin' Adventure", but changed to "Van" in subsequent appearances.
- David Herman as Gill Beavers, a boy with an unrequited crush on Judy, and Santiago Carpaccio, a tall, quiet resident of Lone Moose who speaks in a non-specific Southern European accent.
- Aloysius Hootch as Delmer, an octogenarian Yup'ik man who owns a curling rink. In the episode "Wanted: Delmer Alive Adventure", it's revealed that Delmer acted as a father figure to Beef and his brother Brian due to their own parents being unreliable. Delmer was married at some point in his past, and his very elderly father is still alive.
- Princess Daazhraii Johnson (credited as Princess Johnson) as Esther Evanoff, Kima's mother and a professional smokejumper.
- Charlie Kelly as Drama John, a classmate of Ham and Judy. Drama John frequently does things to create emotional drama for his family or anyone around him, such as throwing his birth certificate into a fire or joining an art club just so he can storm out of it. He is best friends with Bethany.
- Martha Kelly as Bethany Bupatutti, a classmate of Ham and Judy. Bethany speaks in a monotone voice, dresses in a punk/goth style, and has a variety of eccentric interests and beliefs, such as owning a "haunted" porcelain doll, planning for defence against pirate attacks, and asserting that reality is a simulation that makes everyone's choices for them. She also frequently hides in the ventilation ducts and on the roof of Lone Moose School for days at a time, usually to avoid spending time with her family. Bethany plays drums under the name "Bethany Bones" in Messengers of Chaos, Ham's punk band. She is later shown having a part-time job at Scone Moose.
- Phil LaMarr as Louis Shaw, Honeybee's father, who co-owns a curtain store in Fresno with his wife Ruth.
- Qituvituaq Litchard as Dane, Kima's college-aged cousin, who lives with her family.
- Jane Lynch as Dirtrude Gertrude "Aunt Dirt" Tobin, the elder sister of Beef's father. In the season 4 episode "Aunt Misbehavin' Adventure", Aunt Dirt is discovered living in a fallout shelter on the Tobins' property, where she had been hiding since March 27, 1964, after mistaking an earthquake for a Soviet invasion. Aunt Dirt is a lesbian, and it is insinuated that part of the reason for her extended isolation was being heartbroken over her secret girlfriend, Melinda, marrying a man in Wasilla, which Dirt learned about on the same day as the earthquake. Dirt is getting used to the idea that she can be openly gay in the modern world, and often gets help in dealing with it from Ham. Dirt's six decades of isolation from the world causes her to act like it's still the 1960s, but she often reverses the gender roles of the postwar period and displays the outdated mannerisms typical of men from midcentury America: she frequently acts in a casually sexist way towards women, makes anti-Communist remarks, has a penchant for hard liquor, and often carries and uses firearms and other weapons in a careless fashion. In the season 5 episode "Can't Hardly Debate Adventure", Dirt gets a job as a lunch lady at Lone Moose School, mostly to have opportunities to hit on the head lunch lady, Gloria; in the final episode, "It's a Beef-derful Life", Dirt and Gloria connect over their mutual interest in stockpiling weapons for post-apocalyptic survival.
- Monique Moreau as Dr. French, Lone Moose's veterinarian.
- Alanis Morissette as Alanis Morissette, Judy's interpretation of the acclaimed singer and her apparent imaginary friend who only appears in the Aurora Borealis. Judy often speaks to her for guidance on certain things. Serving to reference Morissette's role as God in Kevin Smith's View Askewniverse films Dogma and Jay and Silent Bob Strike Back, Morissette is occasionally shown to exist separately from Judy's imagination.
- Megan Mullally (seasons 1-5) and Anne Yatco (season 5's "Serendipi-Beef Adventure" and "It's a Beef-derful Life") as Alyson Lefebvrere, Judy's boss at the photography studio and an artist in her own right. She and Beef are shown to have a mutual attraction, but the two never go beyond flirting until season 5's "Serendipi-Beef Adventure", where the two profess their mutual love.
- Ruby Nicazio as Quinn Notti, Moon's classmate and a fellow member of the Junior Janitors and the Li'l Preppers. Moon has a long-standing crush on Quinn, and she agrees to be his girlfriend in season 5's "Serendipi-Beef Adventure".
- Lennon Parham as Marie, the mother of Moon's friend Russell, and friends with Beef, Dorothy Tuntley, and Carissa Van. She has a long-term boyfriend named Jamie.
- Edi Patterson as Stacy B., a mean popular girl at Lone Moose School who antagonizes Judy, her former childhood best friend.
- Chelsea Peretti as Lara Silverblatt, a bush pilot and Wolf's ex-girlfriend.
- Mark Proksch as Councilman Roy Fletcher, a member of the Lone Moose town council. Roy's pet eagle, Toby, is also a member of Lone Moose's three-member council, giving Roy effective legislative control of the town government.
- Missi Pyle as Ms. McNamara, the guidance counselor at Lone Moose School.
- Andrea Savage as Chief Elba, the police chief of Orca Bay, who is also Chief Edna's sister.
- Jana Schmieding as Zelda Blop, a woman with an obsession with marrying Beef, after they made a promise in high school to marry each other if they were both still single at 40; and Loud Sandy, a student at Lone Moose School with a loud indoor speaking voice.
- Judith Shelton as Londra Pennypacker, a mild-mannered fisherwoman whose boat is moored close to Beef's. Londra is a lesbian, and lives with her partner, Dusty. In a running gag, the Tobins are regularly too busy to stop and talk to Londra.
- Mindy Sterling as Junkyard Kyle, a mechanically adept woman in a pink jumpsuit who runs a local junkyard.
- Robin Thede as Diondra Tundra, a TV reporter for KVFP Channel 36 News.
- Paul F. Tompkins as Theodore Golovkin, Ham and Judy's teacher at the Lone Moose School with a passion for film noir, home-brewed kombucha, and model trains. Mr. Golovkin is also friends with Beef, and is in a Knife Club with him, Londra, Junkyard Kyle and Santiago Carpaccio. In the season 3 episode "Arrange-erous Minds Adventure", Moon finds common ground with Mr. Golovkin over their shared obsessive-compulsive tendencies; by season 5's "Dial M for Moon-der", this friendship has grown to include Mr. Golovkin lending Moon his DVDs of classic film-noir movies. Mr. Golovkin is in a relationship with Ms. Anderson, another teacher at Lone Moose School.
  - Tompkins also voiced a traffic cop in the episode "Cheese All That Adventure", and a cruise ship captain in "You've Got Sail Adventure".
- Julio Torres (seasons 1-3) and Juan Castano (from season 3's "Rear Genius Adventure" to season 5's "It's a Beef-derful Life") as Crispin Cienfuegos, Ham's boyfriend from season 1's "Pride & Prejudance Adventure" to Season 5's "Bots on the Side Adventure". Crispin moved to Lone Moose from Grand Rapids, Michigan, with his family, and has a part-time job at the smoothie stand at the mall.
- Ariel Tweto as Kima Evanoff, Judy's best friend and a Native Alaskan (in "High Expectations Adventure", Kima says she is Sugpiaq and Athabascan). Kima shares much of Judy's idealism and passion, but is more level-headed. Kima's last name was initially shown in the show's credits as "Brewper", before it was established as "Evanoff" in "Rear Genius Adventure".
- Reggie Watts as Quay, a cool classmate of Ham and Judy who also plays guitar in Ham's punk band, Messengers of Chaos.
- Brian Wescott as Walt Evanoff, Kima's father and a climate scientist.
- Jenny Yang as Carissa Van, Debbie Van's mother. In the season 4 episode "Bear of Beeftown Adventure", she became Beef's girlfriend, but they had broken up by season 5's "Dial M for Moon-der Adventure". Carissa is a divorcée, and shares custody of Debbie with her ex-husband, Ken. In her first episode, season 2's "Beef Mommas House Adventure", she is shown to be in a friend group with Marie and Dorothy, the mothers of Moon's other friends Russell and Henry. In the season 4 episode "Cheese All That Adventure", Carissa opens a coffee shop, Scone Moose.
- Kelvin Yu as Steven Huang, a classmate of Ham and Judy and Judy's love interest in the first season. Steven plays bass under the name "Steven the Psycho" in Messengers of Chaos, Ham's punk band.

== Episodes ==
Season	Episodes	Originally released	
Season	Episodes	First released	Last released
1	11	January 3, 2021	May 16, 2021
2	22	September 26, 2021	May 22, 2022
3	22	September 25, 2022	May 21, 2023
4	20	January 7, 2024	September 15, 2024
5	22	December 22, 2024	September 14, 2025

== Production ==
=== Development ===
On September 28, 2018, it was first announced that the series was in development, from creators Wendy and Lizzie Molyneux and Minty Lewis, with Loren Bouchard also set to executive produce. The series was officially given a series order by Fox on May 9, 2019, with Fox Entertainment producing, Bento Box Entertainment animating and 20th Television distributing. The underlying rights to the show are jointly held between Fox Corporation and 20th Television, which used to be under the same corporate umbrella as the rest of Fox before being sold to Disney in March 2019.

On May 13, 2019, it was announced that the series was set to premiere in 2020, but on May 11, 2020, this was revised to a premiere mid-season the 2020–21 television season. Later, a February 2021 premiere was announced. On June 22, 2020, Fox renewed the series for a second season ahead of its premiere. On December 18, 2020, it was confirmed that the series would premiere on February 14, 2021, as part of Fox's Animation Domination programming block. On December 22, 2020, a special preview on January 3, 2021, was announced. On May 17, 2021, the day after the first-season finale was broadcast, Fox renewed the series for a third season. The second season premiered on September 26, 2021. The third season premiered on September 25, 2022. A fourth season has also been picked up. The fourth season premiered on January 7, 2024. On January 27, 2024, co-creator Wendy Molyneux announced that a fifth season was ordered.

On October 3, 2025, Fox canceled the series after five seasons, to make room for the return of American Dad! to the network.

=== Casting ===
On September 28, 2018, when the series was first announced, a cast of Nick Offerman, Jenny Slate, Megan Mullally, Paul Rust, Aparna Nancherla, Will Forte, and Dulcé Sloan was presented. On June 22, 2020, it was stated that Alanis Morissette would voice herself in the series.

== Broadcast ==
In Canada, the series aired on Citytv for its first season, and its last two seasons. Since 2024, CHCH and Citytv share its broadcast rights due to scheduling issues.

The show is available to stream on Hulu in the United States, and for purchase on all major digital stores. In India, the series is simulcasted on Disney+ Hotstar because of 20th Television's output deal with Star India.

The show is available to stream on Disney+ via the Star content hub in selected territories and Star+ in Latin America.

In Denmark, the show initially premiered exclusively on Xee on July 9, 2021. The show was later added to Disney+ on March 9, 2022, with the first season and the first three episodes from the second season included.

== Reception ==
=== Critical response ===
On Rotten Tomatoes, the series' first season holds an approval rating of 100% based on 15 reviews, with an average rating of 7.9/10. The website's critics consensus reads: "As cozy as a night spent relaxing by the fireplace with your favorite funny people, The Great North is a delightfully hilarious addition to Fox's Animation Domination lineup." On Metacritic (which uses a weighted average), the season has a score of 77 out of 100 based on 10 critics, indicating "generally favorable reviews".

Daniel Fienberg of The Hollywood Reporter praised the performances of the actors and complimented the humor of the series, comparing it to Bob's Burgers, while noting that the series made token references to Indigenous representation and said it should embrace those more in future episodes, writing, "Then again, with memorable characters (captured in that familiar Bento Box Entertainment style), running credit gags and catchy episode-closing songs, I don't think Bob's Burgers as reimagined by somebody who just watched Northern Exposure would be such a bad thing anyway." Margaret Lyons of The New York Times praised the humor of the show, saying the series recalls Bob's Burgers and seems to act as a spin-off, writing, "This new comedy by some of the folks from Bob's Burgers isn't technically a spinoff, but it might as well be — in a good way! [...] like many comedies, it gets funnier as it goes along, but it has a silly sweetness from the start."

Joyce Slaton of Common Sense Media rated the series 4 out of 5 stars, praised the depiction of positive messages and role models, calling some of the characters lovable, supportive, and tolerant, and complimented the humor and the diversity of the cast, writing, "There's a strong streak of sweetness in this comedy, particularly in the way that family love is strong and central. The show clearly has a love for oddballs, and the humor is gentle and non-mocking." Ben Travers of IndieWire gave the series a B+ grade, called The Great North a "worthy successor to Bob's Burgers", stating the series manages to keep its own identity even across its similarities with Bob's Burgers, praised the animation of the show for its color palette, while noting The Great North is the only animated Fox comedy with a black family member, saying, "After decades spent churning out Simpsons clones, Fox is finally building off its other, nicer, animated sitcom — with encouraging results."

=== Ratings ===
Viewership and ratings per season of The Great North
Season	Timeslot (ET)	Episodes	First aired		Last aired		TV season	Avg. viewers (millions)
Season	Timeslot (ET)	Episodes	Date	Viewers (millions)	Date	Viewers (millions)	TV season	Avg. viewers (millions)
1	Sunday 8:30 p.m. (Episodes 1, 3–11); Sunday 10:00 p.m. (Episode 2)	11	January 3, 2021	2.34	May 16, 2021	0.81	2020–21	TBD
2	Sunday 8:30 p.m.	22	September 26, 2021	1.85	May 22, 2022	0.69	2021–22	TBD
3	Sunday 8:30 p.m. (Episodes 1–8, 10–22); Sunday 9:30 p.m. (Episode 9)	22	September 25, 2022	2.13	May 21, 2023	0.65	2022–23	TBD
4	Sunday 9:00 p.m. (Episodes 1–15, 17, 19); Sunday 9:30 p.m. (Episodes 16, 18, 20)	20	January 7, 2024	0.81	September 15, 2024	0.56	2023–24	TBD
5	Sunday 9:00 p.m. (Episodes 1–8, 21); Sunday 9:30 p.m. (Episodes 9–12, 20, 22); Thursday 9:30 p.m. (Episodes 13–15, 17–19); Thursday 9:00 p.m. (Episode 16)	22	December 22, 2024	0.59	September 14, 2025	0.75	2024–25	TBD

=== Accolades ===
The Great North was nominated for Best Animated Series for the 2021 Critics' Choice Awards. It was nominated for Tweens/Teens Programming – Best Animated Series at the 2024 Kidscreen Awards.
