= List of The Jungle Bunch episodes =

This is a list containing the episodes of the French animated television series, The Jungle Bunch.

== Series overview ==
Series	Episodes	Originally released	
Series	Episodes	First released	Last released
1	53	29 December 2013	2014
2	53	2016	2017
3	52	2020	2021

== Films (2011–23) ==
1. The Jungle Bunch: Back to the Ice Floe (2011)
2. The Jungle Bunch 2: The Great Treasure Quest (2014)
3. The Jungle Bunch (2017)
4. Les As de la jungle 2: Opération tour du monde (2023)

== Episodes ==
=== Season 1 (2013–14) ===
No. overall	No. in season	Title	Directed by	Written by	Original release date	Prod. code
1	1	"Deep Into the Chasm" "Au Fond du Gouffre"	Julien Fournet	Julien Fournet	29 December 2013	TBA
Professor Ernest, a kiwi and the genius inventor of the Jungle, comes to the Jungle Bunch because an earth tremor has opened up a large crack right in the middle of his village! He needs the Jungle Bunch to repair it : they go deep inside the crack and, with the help of Ernest and Patrick succeed in "repairing" the village.
2	2	"The Boulder of Fear" "Le Rocher de la peur"	David Alaux and Éric Tosti	David Alaux; Éric Tosti; Jean-François Tosti	30 December 2013	TBA
elephants are bullied by a so-called ghost. Hidden behind a rock, the ghost asks them to give him all their fruits as an offering. The Jungle Bunch will soon discover that the ghost is just a very special animal, a chameleon that appears and disappears.
3	3	"Rubies Are Forever" "Les Rubis sont éternels"	David Alaux	Julien Fournet; David Alaux; Éric Tosti; Jean-François Tosti	31 December 2013	TBA
Melina, a former lover of Gilbert when he was young, hijacked the rubies of the jungle to create a malefic laser. She wants to take possession of the jungle and the Jungle Bunch lair. She is helped by an army of crabs, totally dedicated to her.
4	4	"The Bloody Berry" "La Baie sanglante"	Éric Tosti	David Alaux; Éric Tosti; Jean-François Tosti	1 January 2014	TBA
A strange illness hits a turtle: impossible to get her out of her deep slumber since she swallowed a beautiful red fruit, her friend comes to ask the help of the Jungle Bunch. Batricia on her side is looking for the best lipstick to seduce Gilbert. She believes she has found it with the magnificent red berry. The Jungle Bunch go searching the antidote that will save the turtle and Batricia.
5	5	"The Invasion Has Begun" "L'Invasion a déjà commencé"	Éric Tosti	Nicolas Robin; Hervé Benedetti	2 January 2014	TBA
Flamingos think horseshoe crabs are aliens who have invaded their lake. Because of a misunderstanding between Batricia and Gilbert, the Jungle Bunch find themselves divided into two opposing camps. After a battle Maurice realizes that this is all a big misunderstanding… the flamingos and the horseshoe crab have never tried to speak to each other, and the aliens have not yet arrived.
6	6	"Mission Keep Calm" "Mission zénitude"	David Alaux	Nicolas Robin; Hervé Benedetti; David Alaux; Éric Tosti; Jean-François Tosti	3 January 2014	TBA
The Jungle Bunch is called by peaceful otters to save their village ransacked by hamsters. At one condition not using violence. The Jungle Bunch leave to the village trying to parley but they do not succeed. They eventually attract the hamsters in a cage from which they escape. Finally, they suggest that everyone kisses… that will make the hamsters escape for good.
7	7	"Captain Cahouete" "Captain Cahouète"	Julien Fournet	Julien Fournet	5 January 2014	TBA
But who is this Captain Cahouete pretending to be as brave as the Jungle Bunch and challenging the Grand Furax? Will he take the place of the Jungle Bunch? Maurice worries. Fortunately the Five Flamboyants (the Jungle Bunch…) are there and will put things in order.
8	8	"The Sand of Fire" "Le Sable de feu"	David Alaux	Julien Fournet; David Alaux; Éric Tosti; Jean-François Tosti	6 January 2014	TBA
Maurice must repair his stripes, they are almost deleted. As they were playing "Jedi", Al and Bob overthrew the barrel containing the orange paint of Maurice. The Jungle Bunch goes to the painter Salvador to get the orange pigment, but he hasn't it anymore. They have to go in the desert where they meet Bud the nasty and crazy fennec. He thinks he is the guardian of the "sand fire". He will destroy the water supply of the Jungle Bunch…
9	9	"The Great Evil Itch" "Le Grand Mal qui gratte"	Éric Tosti	Julien Fournet; David Alaux; Éric Tosti; Jean-François Tosti	7 January 2014	TBA
What is this Great Evil Itch that makes the meerkats crazy? Mama Dongo, an old meerkat, calls the Jungle Bunch to the rescue to find it out! They will soon discover that it is not a curse but an invasion of lices. They just need to find the right remedy… so the meerkat can become normal again.
10	10	"Princess Groundhog" "Princesse Marmotte"	Julien Fournet	Julien Fournet	8 January 2014	TBA
The Jungle Bunch find a mother groundhog just in front of the cave, she's asleep, and with her, here's Lola, her little groundhog, she doesn't want to sleep… She is very active and she loves wrestling. The Jungle Bunch will have to take her back trying to make her sleep by telling her a nice story.
11	11	"The Striking Cry" "Le Cri qui foudroie"	Éric Tosti	Christophe Lemoine; David Alaux; Éric Tosti; Jean-François Tosti	9 January 2014	TBA
Hyenas attract the Jungle Bunch in a false adventure, they want to get rid of them because they are too good: what makes the hyenas laugh is seeing other animals in trouble. The Jungle Bunch find themselves trapped in a cage overlooking an island surrounded by hungry crocodiles… fortunately Maurice is the master of the "Striking Cry".
12	12	"Boiling Show" "Show bouillant"	Julien Fournet	Julien Fournet	10 January 2014	TBA
Fred is taken to the Roc of the Lynx, by the lynx he has recruited as singers. They want to get rid of him and to become the only singers of the Jungle.
13	13	"Free Fall" "Chute Libre"	David Alaux	Julien Fournet; David Alaux; Éric Tosti; Jean-François Tosti	11 January 2014	TBA
Edward is a young flying fox, he comes to the Jungle Bunch: all his friends are making fun of his fear of heights! Gilbert who, apparently, has lived such humiliation in his childhood, took him under his protection and decides to teach him how to overcome his fear by making him jump from the tallest tree in the jungle.
14	14	"Old Jim's Treasure" "Le Trésor du vieux Jim"	Julien Fournet	Julien Fournet	TBA	TBA
15	15	"Old Jim's Treasure" "Le Trésor du vieux Jim"	Julien Fournet	Julien Fournet	TBA	TBA
16	16	"Old Jim's Treasure" "Le Trésor du vieux Jim"	Julien Fournet	Julien Fournet	TBA	TBA
17	17	"Old Jim's Treasure" "Le Trésor du vieux Jim"	Julien Fournet	Julien Fournet	TBA	TBA
Part 1: The Jungle cave is brutally attacked by a horde of rampaging pirates: Dirty Beard and his gang are searching for Suzy, a young raccoon pirate, they want to retrieve the treasure map of his father's the Old Jim… The Jungle Bunch go with Suzy in search of the treasure. Part 2: Al, Bob and Fred have been accepted on Dirty Beard's ship. He thinks they are cooks. Meantime the Jungle Bunch and Suzy follow them on a balloon they must find the Isle of the Yellow Dragon before Dirty beard. Along the way, the Jungle Bunch face the terrible dragon and discover the traditions of the gerbils. Part 3: The Jungle Bunch and Suzy are stuck in a giant cake, made by the jerboas. Batricia is Dirty Beard's prisoner, she printed the map of the treasure on her body. Maurice, Gilbert, Junior and Miguel escape the jerboas. They free Fred, Al, Bob and Batricia. The yellow monster appears, he knows Suzy, and thanks to the lyrics of the song of Suzy, the Jungle Bunch find the Whale Rock, and the Snake cave. They are closer to the treasure, but so are the pirates. Part 4: After a big fight against the pirates and a few traps, the Jungle Bunch reach the treasure!
18	18	"The Little Plant of Horrors" "La Petite bouture des horreurs"	Julien Fournet	Julien Fournet	TBA	TBA
Marla, a crazy botanist, can't control anymore the carnivorous plant she has created… it doesn't stop growing. The Jungle Bunch have to destroy it.
19	19	"The Devastation" "Le Fléau"	David Alaux	Julien Fournet; David Alaux; Éric Tosti; Jean-François Tosti	TBA	TBA
Vladimir and a termite clan have taken possession of the jungle, they destroy the trees and this causes a chain reaction.
20	20	"The Jungle Bunch and the Lost Groove" "Les Aventuriers du groove perdu"	Éric Tosti	Nicolas Robin; Hervé Benedetti	TBA	TBA
Fred has lost his groove and only Pelvis, the king of the Rock can help him find it. The only problem is that Pelvis is mostly king of the playback.
21	21	"The Swamp" "Le Marais"	Éric Tosti	David Alaux; Éric Tosti; Jean-François Tosti	TBA	TBA
A toucan family have lost their egg at the bottom of the swamp and the Jungle Bunch are sent to recover the egg before it hatches.
22	22	"The Five Taos of Thunder" "Les Cinq Taos du tonnerre"	Julien Fournet	Julien Fournet	TBA	TBA
Maurice's Kung Fu Master, Hector the echidna, comes to the Jungle Bunch because Koro and his henchmen, the mandrills and the monkeys want to steal the Five Taos of Thunder.
23	23	"Flight Over a Lettuce Nest" "Vol au-dessus d'un nid de salades"	David Alaux	Éliane Vigneron; David Alaux; Éric Tosti; Jean-François Tosti	TBA	TBA
It's been a few weeks since lettuce started disappearing at the turtles nursing home. Karapas seeks the Jungle Bunch's help and after an investigation they discover the robber is an old friend of Karapas.
24	24	"Daddy Miguel" "Papa Miguel"	Julien Fournet	Claire Paoletti; Marine Lachenaud; David Alaux; Sophie Caron; Éric Tosti; Jean-François Tosti	TBA	TBA
When a hummingbird egg hatches right in front of the Jungle Bunch cave, Miguel becomes the hatchling's father.
25	25	"Seven Minutes Flat" "Sept minutes chrono"	David Alaux	Julien Fournet; David Alaux; Éric Tosti; Jean-François Tosti	TBA	TBA
Ernest devices a system to boil water inside the volcano and when things getting out of control, the Jungle Bunch have seven minutes to keep the volcano from destroying the jungle.
26	26	"An Impossible Mission" "Mission pas Possible"	Éric Tosti	Nicolas Robin; Hervé Benedetti	TBA	TBA
When the signal is triggered while all the Jungle Bunch falls ill, Al and Bob are the only two who can take on the mission, but turns Ferdinand tricks them into stealing the mandrill's treasure.
27	27	"The Night Monster" "Le Monstre de la nuit"	Éric Tosti	Romain Gadiou; Choé Sastre	TBA	TBA
A beaver family seeks the Jungle Bunch's help because the home keeps getting destroyed by a giant tyrannical demon.
28	28	"Possum Recall" "La Mémoire dans l'opossum"	David Alaux	Romain Gadiou; Choé Sastre	TBA	TBA
An opossum rings the signal of the Jungle Bunch, but he can not remember who he is.
29	29	"The Valley of the Hundred Perils" "La Vallée des cent périls"	Julien Fournet	David Alaux; Éric Tosti; Jean-François Tosti	TBA	TBA
No one has ever reached the end of the Valley of Hundred Perils. The Jungle Bunch will however have to go there to find two lovers who ran away.
30	30	"Dragon Mission" "Opération Dragon"	Éric Tosti	Julien Fournet; David Alaux; Éric Tosti; Jean-François Tosti	TBA	TBA
A mysterious dragon has hypnotized a vulture, and a komodo dragon who broke into the naked mole rat's underground city and stole a treasure.
31	31	"The Prophecy" "La Prophétie"	Julien Fournet	Julien Fournet	TBA	TBA
Mama Dongo's village gives all of their food as offerings to the goods to avoid the end of the world and now it seems the prophecy will come true!
32	32	"Smoked Bananas" "Bananes flambées"	Éric Tosti	David Alaux; Éric Tosti; Jean-François Tosti; Julien Fournet	TBA	TBA
A cockatoo comes inside of the Jungle Bunch lair and imitates their voice giving orders or contradictory instructions to each other. That creates a huge mess. Meanwhile, a fire starts in the jungle. The Jungle Bunch go to the rescue, but with the cockatoo, it's not easy.
33	33	"Junior's First Catch" "Toute première proie"	David Alaux	David Alaux; Julien Fournet; Éric Tosti; Jean-François Tosti	TBA	TBA
Junior wants to show Maurice all he has learned in becoming a great warrior and tiger by grabbing his first prey alone (a hungry crocodile).
34	34	"Assault on the Jungle Bunch" "Assaut sur les As"	Julien Fournet	Romain Gadiou; Choé Sastre	TBA	TBA
An Evil black Rhinoceros named Big Tony has launched a hunt throughout the jungle, he is after the monster who had stolen his fruits on his trees. All the animals are very scared and take refuge in the jungle cave. The Jungle Bunch protect the animals and the little jerboa who took the fruits without knowing it was not allowed.
35	35	"In Her Majesty Service" "Au service de sa Majesté"	Éric Tosti	Sophie Lamant; Grégoire Louge; David Alaux; Éric Tosti; Jean-François Tosti	TBA	TBA
Gilbert's family is held hostage by the King of the koalas. The King wants to offer the Jungle Bunch as a birthday present to his spoiled daughter who will consider them as her toys.
36	36	"The Fan Club" "Le Fan Club"	Julien Fournet	Julien Fournet; David Alaux; Hervé Benedetti; Christophe Lemoine; Nicolas Robin; Éric Tosti; Jean-François Tosti	TBA	TBA
Captain Cahouete, Melina, the Hyenas, Brito and the hamsters, Vladimir and Grand Furax former opponents pose as members of a fan club.
37	37	"The Jungle Bunch's Nightmare" "Le Cauchemar des As"	David Alaux	Sébastien Chrisostome	TBA	TBA
An jerboa named Mickey poisons the Jungle Bunch with a plant that can make you have nightmares.
38	38	"Jungle Bells" "Le Noël des As"	Julien Fournet	Julien Fournet	TBA	TBA
Parents seek help when their kids won't listen to them.
39	39	"The Strongest Animal in the Jungle" "Le plus fort de la jungle"	Julien Fournet	Nicolas Digard	TBA	TBA
Miguel is tricked into a tournament competing for the title of Strongest Animal in the Jungle.
40	40	"Desperately Seeking Bob" "Recherche Bob désespérément"	Julien Fournet	Hervé Benedetti; Nicolas Robin	TBA	TBA
The Jungle Bunch must track down Bob after he and Al have a conflict. They better find Bob soon because he finds himself in a sticky situation!
41	41	"Saving Al and Bob!" "À la rescousse d'Al et Bob"	Éric Tosti	Romain Gadiou; Choé Sastre	TBA	TBA
Al and Bob have been kidnapped! The Jungle Bunch go to save them, but there are many traps along the way.
42	42	"Jungle Eyes" "Les Yeux de la jungle"	Julien Fournet	Nicolas Robin; Hervé Benedetti	TBA	TBA
A peacock hypnotizes a clan of jerboas to paint the jungle fuchsia!
43	43	"The Cyclone Eye" "L'Œil du cyclone"	Julien Fournet	Sébastien Chrisostome	TBA	TBA
Gilbert is the only one to anticipate the arrival of a huge Cyclone, and Gilbert is hurt, annoyed because nobody takes him seriously. A thunderstorm of hailstones bursts out, Maurice and the Jungle Bunch leave warning the other animals of the jungle and putting them under cover. But while they think of having saved everybody, a small groundhog comes to see them because they forgot her grandfather. The Jungle Bunch look for him, in the cyclone, and discover that his old grandfather is really very bad-tempered.
44	44	"Shells and Shellfish" "Coquillages et crustacés"	Sylvain Charreau	Sophie Lamant; Grégoire Louge; David Alaux; Éric Tosti; Jean-François Tosti	TBA	TBA
The Jungle Bunch are on vacation to try to rest. But this mission of relaxation turns out to be more complicated than planned as all the animals around the beach ask them to solve their problems.
45	45	"Web of Fear" "Peur sur la toile"	David Alaux	Dérya Kocaurlu; Yannick Moulin; David Alaux; Éric Tosti; Jean-François Tosti	TBA	TBA
A gothic female armadillo named Audrey, and Bibi, her little spider, need help. All the spiders of the jungle are gone. Gilbert is afraid of the ecological loss of balance, so, the Jungle Bunch goes search the spiders. They find that it's Vladimir, the vampire opossum who diverts them to spin a giant web. He also makes Salvador paint his giant portrait on it.
46	46	"Trippleped Strikes Back!" "Tri-pattes contre-attaque!"	Julien Fournet	Julien Fournet	TBA	TBA
Two young panic kiwis, Mina and Nina, ring at the Jungle Cave door: They saw a scary freak with three legs in the Forbidden City which Gilbert seems to know very well. Actually, he used to build some machines, including the "Three-legs". But now, it's waking up and it's really dangerous! The Jungle Bunch has to stop it before it destroys the kiwis' village.
47	47	"The Yellow Cave Mystery" "Le Mystère de la grotte jaune"	Julien Fournet	Romain Gadiou; Choé Sastre; Julien Fournet	TBA	TBA
The Queen Esmeralda's crown has been Stolen! Without it she will not be considered queen anymore. The Jungle Bunch go out to investigate this mystery.
48	48	"Jungle Bunch Tackles a Wedding" "Mariage et plaquage"	Julien Fournet	Nicolas Robin; Hervé Benedetti	TBA	TBA
A box turtle named Marcel comes to see the Jungle Bunch. He's about to get married, but during a bachelor party which took place before the marriage, he met a band of Rowdy mandrill rugby players who employed him as a "ball". As a result, he is now very far from his future wife and risks to miss the marriage.
49	49	"The Fireflies Night" "La Fête des lucioles"	Julien Fournet	Romain Gadiou; Choé Sastre; Julien Fournet; Sophie Caron	TBA	TBA
Batricia's sisters want to bring Batricia back to her village for the fireflies party. She follows them with Gilbert, who wants to see the sparkling fireflies, a very rare species.
50	50	"Hic Hic Hiccups!" "Y'a comme un hic"	David Alaux	Hervé Benedetti; Nicolas Robin	TBA	TBA
A gerbil needs help because she hasn't been able to get rid of her hiccup. No problem, Maurice and his friends just have to frighten her but even the Valley of Fear and its terrible legend doesn't scare the gerbil.
51	51	"The Stars Stone" "La Pierre des étoiles"	Julien Fournet	Julien Fournet	TBA	TBA
A koala named Roger, is looking for the Jungle Bunch: five reptiles invaded his garden. Dhoom, a cobra and his gang are observing a big stone in the middle of Roger's garden. The Jungle Bunch and Patrick, the axolotl who's visiting his friends, go to the garden. Dhoom is venerating the star stone which is actually a meteorite made of metal. Gilbert knows that. He is afraid of the coming storm, as this could make the stone electric.
52	52	"The Jungle Bunch Behind The Wheel" "Les As au volant"	Stéphane Loncan	Stéphane Loncan; Yannick Vanes; Hervé Benedetti; Nicolas Robin	TBA	TBA
It's the mandrills vs. the koalas in a car race, with the loser leaving the jungle.
53	53	"Funny Bird" "Drôle D'Oiseau"	David Alaux; Éric Tosti	David Alaux; Éric Tosti; Jean-François Tosti	2014	TBA
The Jungle Bunch goes about their day-to-day lives around their pond, when two characters appear: a caterpillar, followed by its regular predator, an Owl. The Owl, as unmoved as indestructible, quickly irritates the Jungle Bunch who tries to get rid of it by all means necessary! Note: This is the first crossover episode with the series The Owl & Co.

=== Season 2: The Jungle Bunch: To the Rescue! (2016–17) ===
This season was released in France on 2016.

No. overall	No. in season	Title	Directed by	Written by	Original release date	Prod. code
54	1	"The Cube" "Le Cube"	Julien Fournet	Julien Fournet	TBA	TBA
The Jungle Bunch prevents the other animals from taking a blue cube, but in the end, it turned out to be a copy of Al's Sculptures.
55	2	"Show Must Go On"	Sylvain Charreau	Nicolas Robin; Hervé Benedetti; David Alaux; Éric Tosti; Jean-François Tosti	TBA	TBA
Fred is kidnapped by Pelvis and the Jungle Bunch must save him.
56	3	"The Melting Mangoes" "Les Mangues Molles"	Julien Fournet	Sébastien Chrisostome	TBA	TBA
Salvador comes to the Jungle Bunch, very upset because someone stole his most beautiful painting called "The Melting Mangoes".
57	4	"Dance of the Vultures" "Le Bal des Vautours"	Sylvain Charreau	Cédric Bacconnier	TBA	TBA
A raccoon named Nestor Ivan comes asking the Jungle Bunch for help because every night, raccoons mysteriously disappeared from the village he lives in. They discover what is causing the disappearances, a vulture named Conde Nosferapace who is kidnapping the raccoons to use as servants for his annual ball called "The Dance of the Vultures". He spots Batricia and kidnaps her to be his future wife. Now it is up to Maurice and the boys to rescue her from Nosferapace.
58	5	"The Mini Jungle Bunch" "Les Mini-As"	Julien Fournet	Julien Fournet	TBA	TBA
Six little baby animals Lolo, Tooko, Freddy, Louie, and Al and Bob's nephews play as if they were the Jungle Bunch. When they see that the Jungle Bunch is getting ready for a new mission, they decide to follow them from a far.
59	6	"Bad Hamsters" "Hamsters Joviaux"	Sylvain Charreau	Hervé Benedetti; Nicolas Robin; David Alaux; Éric Tosti; Jean-François Tosti	TBA	TBA
When the Jungle Bunch are tricked by Brito and the hamsters, it is up to Al and Bob to gain back control of the Jungle Cave from the furry menaces.
60	7	"The Tiger Hunt" "Chasse au Tigre"	Julien Fournet	Julien Fournet	TBA	TBA
A cockatoo tells Maurice and Junior they are invited to a Tiger's convention but it turns out to be a trick by Captain Cahouete, the Great Furax, Melina, Vladimir, Doom and Fuse.
61	8	"Abracadabra"	Sylvain Charreau	Valérie Chappellet; Olivier Croset	TBA	TBA
Two bats come to ask for help from the Jungle Bunch because a mandrill magician evicted from their cave who finds that their cave is the ideal place to settle down and perform magic tricks.
62	9	"Pursuing the Green Emerald Paw Paw" "À la poursuite de la papaye verte"	Julien Fournet	Cédric Bacconnier	TBA	TBA
Marla comes to the Jungle Bunch because the moment has come for the delicious green emerald Paw Paw to bloom, that happens only once every 100 years, but mandrills know about it and they are going to try to eat it.
63	10	"All Bets Are Off" "Rien ne va plus"	Sylvain Charreau	Valérie Chappellet; Olivier Croset	TBA	TBA
Some others are running a possibly crooked casino.
64	11	"Catch as Catch Can" "Catch ou pas catch"	Julien Fournet	Romain Gadiou; Choé Sastre	TBA	TBA
Lola's Family are asking the Jungle Bunch for help because their daughter Lola ran away to participate in a wrestling competition. The Jungle Bunch go to the competition, where Junior is also participating.
65	12	"Mammoths Rule!" "La Règne des Mammouths"	Sylvain Charreau	Cécile Nicouleaud	TBA	TBA
A mole named Lucy has come to the Jungle Bunch for help because her boyfriend Emile has been captured by a group of mammoths. The Jungle Bunch think that this is unlikely because mammoths have been extinct for thousands of years.
66	13	"A Secret Mole" "La Taupe Secrète"	Julien Fournet	Julien Fournet	TBA	TBA
Every night, watermelons are stolen by a mole. Could this criminal acts have good intentions ?
67	14	"For a Fistful of Cahouetes" "Pour une Poignée de Cahouètes"	Sylvain Charreau	Cédric Bacconnier	TBA	TBA
Some robbers steal the jungle's supply of cactus juice.
68	15	"The Wild Bunch" "La Horde Sauvage"	Julien Fournet	Naïs Coq	TBA	TBA
The Jungle Bunch help some marmots whose village has been invaded by Johnny the Barbarian and his army of rabbits.
69	16	"Jungle Bums" "Les Nases de la jungle"	Sylvain Charreau	Nicolas Robin; Hervé Benedetti	TBA	TBA
The Jungle Bunch discovers that they have doubles who, though they look alike but don't act like them because they are doing villainous acts to all of the jungle animals.
70	17	"Planet of the Ape" "La Planète du singe"	Julien Fournet	Cédric Bacconnier	TBA	TBA
A beaver named Bruno comes to the Jungle Bunch for help because Koro and the Apes raided his home and captured his family and friends. Now the apes capture the Jungle Bunch and convince Miguel to join them.
71	18	"Tarsier in Danger" "Un Tarsier en Danger"	Sylvain Charreau	Cédric Bacconnier	TBA	TBA
Gilbert is kidnapped by some lynxes who are part of Melina's plan to Eliminate the Jungle Bunch.
72	19	"Guava or Pawpaw" "La Goyave ou la papaye"	Julien Fournet	Nicolas Robin; Hervé Benedetti	TBA	TBA
Alfredo the possum is upset about his meerkat neighbors.
73	20	"The Jungle Feast" "Le Festin de la jungle"	Sylvain Charreau	Jean Regnaud, David Alaux, Éric Tosti and Jean-François Tosti	TBA	TBA
A competitor named Chucky (famous for his Chucky burger) will do whatever it takes to win a cooking competition–even kidnapping Bob to distract his fellow competitor, Al.
74	21	"Ice Cream" "Piège de cristaux"	Julien Fournet	Julien Fournet	TBA	TBA
Ernest has built a machine to collect ice cream from the mountain which is causing avalanches which is scaring animals.
75	22	"An Explosive Duel" "Duel Explosif"	Sylvain Charreau	Max Mamoud; Georges Tzanos	TBA	TBA
An epic battle of scientists ensues at the Jungle Cave when Melina tries to plunder Gilbert's lab.
76	23	"20,000 Bubbles Under the Sea" "20,000 bulles sous les mers"	Julien Fournet	Sophie Caron; Julien Fournet; David Alaux; Éric Tosti; Jean-François Tosti	TBA	TBA
Ernest went into the sea and hasn't come back, so Gilbert uses an improvised submarine and searches for the missing kiwi with Junior.
77	24	"The Jungle Genius Awards" "La Fête des gros cerveaux"	Sylvain Charreau	Nicolas Robin; Hervé Benedetti	TBA	TBA
Gilbert and Ernest enter the Jungle Genius competition but their invention is stolen by Vladimir.
78	25	"This Land is Not Your Land" "Mon Territoire, ma Bataille"	Julien Fournet	Romain Gadiou; Choé Sastre	TBA	TBA
The Jungle Bunch must teach self-confidence to a village of timid jerboas who are being bullied by the King of the Koalas and his henchmen.
79	26	"Rabbit Trickeries" "Les Fourberies du Lapin"	Sylvain Charreau	Cédric Bacconnier	TBA	TBA
The tortoise egg Princess Sissy has been kidnapped by Shenzi, Banzai, Ed and the tricky rabbit Archibald, who pretends to help the Jungle Bunch to retrieve the egg to the turtle queen from surrendering her crown to a snapping turtle before it's too late.
80	27	"The Good, The Baddies and The Intern" "Le Bon, les brutes et le stagiaire"	Julien Fournet	Julien Fournet	TBA	TBA
Miguel is mistakenly kidnapped for Gilbert by El Po-po, an Intern (a rabbit) and a group of evil animals who forced him to make a giant robot to destroy the jungle and the Jungle Bunch's lair, but in the end the giant robot collapses and the Intern decides to join Miguel.
81	28	"Brain Drain" "Mémoire insuffisante"	Sylvain Charreau	Nicolas Robin; Hervé Benedetti	TBA	TBA
Maurice is bitten by a spider and can't remember who he is.
82	29	"Caset Their Nests" "Coups de Filets"	Julien Fournet	Julien Fournet	TBA	TBA
A dangerous mosquito escapes from Gilbert's study forcing the Jungle Bunch to try to prevent an epidemic.
83	30	"Marcel the Puppet Master" "Doudou Marcel"	Sylvain Charreau	Jean Regnaud	TBA	TBA
A village of cuddly koalas (they were in control of sticky licky butter) hypnotizes the Jungle Bunch and makes them to collect the ingredients for the butter.
84	31	"Hibertarsus"	Julien Fournet	Nicolas Robin; Hervé Benedetti	TBA	TBA
Gilbert thaws his prehistoric ancestor from a block of ice but needs to find the prehistoric female mate too.
85	32	"A Sticky Situation" "Le Pot de colle"	Sylvain Charreau	Julien Fournet; Yannick Moulin	TBA	TBA
Roger the gardener has Mr. Stanley stuck to his back and it's up to the Jungle Bunch to free them apart.
86	33	"Saving Junior" "Il Faut sauver le petit tigre Junior"	Julien Fournet	Romain Gadiou; Choé Sastre	TBA	TBA
Junior is kidnapped by raccoons that threaten to hurt him. So, the Jungle Bunch devise a plan to reach the raccoon fortress and release the son of the Great Warrior Tiger using the art of camouflage.
87	34	"SOS Meteorite" "SOS Météorite"	Sylvain Charreau	Nicolas Robin; Hervé Benedetti; David Alaux; Éric Tosti; Jean-François Tosti	TBA	TBA
An asteroid threatens to destroy the jungle. The Jungle Bunch will have to get creative to solve this one while Gilbert is away on a trip.
88	35	"Furies on the Prowl" "Les Furies Rôdent"	Julien Fournet	Julien Fournet	TBA	TBA
A gang of baddies steal the water of the desert and it's up to the Jungle Bunch to stop them.
89	36	"For a Few Pearls More" "Et pour Quelques Perles de Plus"	Sylvain Charreau	Nicolas Robin; Hervé Benedetti; David Alaux; Éric Tosti; Jean-François Tosti	TBA	TBA
While at summer camp, Junior discovers Vladimir leads an army of oyster-ninja. Junior has to break a promise made to his father.
90	37	"The Christmas Heist" "Pas de Casse, Pas de Cadeaux"	Julien Fournet	Cédric Bacconnier; David Alaux; Éric Tosti; Jean-François Tosti	TBA	TBA
The Jungle Bunch has to organize a heist in order to regain a bag of letters made by children for the Presents Feast.
91	38	"The Fake Fan" "Le Faux Fan"	Sylvain Charreau	Cédric Nicouleaud; David Alaux; Éric Tosti; Jean-François Tosti	TBA	TBA
Mickey is a fake fan of the Jungle Bunch so he tricked Victor the Aye Aye about their weaknesses.
92	39	"Eggs Hunt" "Chasse à l'œuf"	Julien Fournet	Romain Gadiou; Choé Sastre; David Alaux; Éric Tosti; Jean-François Tosti	TBA	TBA
Salvador has just lost five eggs he was supposed to paint for the birds. The eggs are now scattered throughout the jungle and will soon hatch.
93	40	"Inseparable Duo" "Les Dieux font la Paire"	Sylvain Charreau	Nicolas Robin; Hervé Benedetti; David Alaux; Éric Tosti; Jean-François Tosti	TBA	TBA
Al and Bob tell how they became friends. Before forming the inseparable duo, the toads were rival detectives, but a tough mission forces them to work together.
94	41	"Beware of the Gorilla" "Gaffe aux Gorilles"	Julien Fournet	Julien Fournet	TBA	TBA
Miguel goes on a trip to visit his family. While visiting, a gang of mandrills wants to steal Miguel's mother restaurant. Miguel has to help his family.
95	42	"Double Frog Dare" "Cap ou pas Cap"	Sylvain Charreau	Sophie Lamant	TBA	TBA
Al decides to help an old friend (who has been forced by Big Tony) retrieve flowers surrounded by quicksand for Tony's fiance and Bob reluctantly goes along for the adventure.
96	43	"A Fishbowl for Two" "Un Bocal pour Dieux"	Julien Fournet	Sandrine Conte Margail	TBA	TBA
A piranha tricks the Jungle Bunch into stealing Junior's new submarine is taken in a plot to steal the pink flamingos' Sapphire Egg.
97	44	"Mini Jungle Bunch, Maxi Fear" "Mini-As, Maxi Frayeur"	Sylvain Charreau	Sophie Caron; Kévin Païs	TBA	TBA
Junior and two young friends take an unexpected ride in a hot air balloon.
98	45	"Jungle Giggles" "La Jungle en délire"	Julien Fournet	Nicolas Robin; Hervé Benedetti	TBA	TBA
The Jungle Bunch come up against the hyena's laughing gas in the heist of the century.
99	46	"Phantoms" "Les Ailes de la nuit"	Sylvain Charreau	Cédric Bacconnier	TBA	TBA
The Jungle Bunch are trapped in a cave and require the assistance of ghosts to escape.
100	47	"Invaders from the Deep" "Les Envahisseurs des Profondeurs"	Julien Fournet	Julien Fournet	TBA	TBA
The Jungle Bunch must protect the tallest, the biggest and the oldest from the people of the deep (Octopuses).
101	48	"Surpriiise!" "Surpriise!"	Sylvain Charreau	Nicolas Robin; Hervé Benedetti	TBA	TBA
Vladimir and the loyal Igor have taken three beaver Uncles as their prisoners.
102	49	"The Jungle Bunch Are in the Place" "Les As sont dans la Place!"	Julien Fournet	Kévin Païs	TBA	TBA
Gilbert & Miguel attend a banquet after a game of 'Yes Yes No No' but are interrupted by bandits.
103	50	"Crescendo Megalo" "Crescendo Mégalo"	Sylvain Charreau	Hélène Blanchard	TBA	TBA
Vladimir and the faithful loyal Igor have taken a musical genius as their prisoner.
104	51	"Patator"	Julien Fournet	Julien Fournet	TBA	TBA
Gilbert unwittingly unleashes an army of potato robots who threaten to enslave everyone including a caracal into growing potatoes.
105	52	"The New Hero" "Le Nouveau Héros"	Sylvain Charreau	Nicolas Robin; Hervé Benedetti	TBA	TBA
Gilbert must rescue three kidnapped youngsters and prove that he is not just a brain but a hero that thinks.
106	53	"Operation the Owl Dragon" "Opération Chouettage De Dragon"	Unknown	Unknown	20 December 2014	TBA
Maurice gets hit in the head by a tree branch and starts thinking that the residents of the forest are the Jungle Bunch. Note: This is the second and last crossover episode with the series The Owl & Co.

=== Season 3: The Jungle Bunch: To the Rescue! (2020) ===
No. overall	No. in season	Title	Directed by	Written by	Original release date	Prod. code
107	1	"Stop! Or My Mum Will Scratch" "Arrête ou Ma mère va griffer"	Laurent Bru	Julien Fournet	TBA	TBA
The hippos are angry with the kiwis and are threatening to destroy their village! Can the Jungle Bunch help them to resolve their differences before things get out of hand?
108	2	"The Scoundrel Museum" "Le Musée Gredin"	Benoît Somville	David Alaux; Éric Tosti; Jean-François Tosti	TBA	TBA
Vladimir has kidnapped all the bees in the jungle, and he's using them to build a wax museum to celebrate his greatness! Can the Jungle Bunch find a way to stop him?
109	3	"Sweet Tooth" "Les Dents de la Plage"	Laurent Bru	David Alaux; Éric Tosti; Jean-François Tosti	TBA	TBA
The jerboas are trapped on their island as a giant saltwater crocodile is stopping them from going in the water. Can the Jungle Bunch find a way to free them?
110	4	"Lethal Banana" "Le Banane Fatale"	Benoît Somville	Julien Fournet	TBA	TBA
All the bananas in the jungle are missing! Goliath and Miguel team up to investigate in this action-packed mission!
111	5	"Tough Luck!" "Pas de bol"	Laurent Bru	Julien Fournet	TBA	TBA
Pollux is suffering from a very strange disease - he's the most unlucky creature in the jungle, and his bad luck seems to be contagious! Can the Jungle Bunch help him to become lucky?
112	6	"Meet the Tarsiers" "Mon beau-père, ma belle-mère et moi"	Benoît Somville	David Alaux; Éric Tosti; Jean-François Tosti	TBA	TBA
Al gets all puffed up, and it's going to take a great botanist to find a cure and get his proper shape back! Gilbert goes in search of his father, Gildas, to see if he can help.
113	7	"The Minis at the Looney Well" "Les Mini-As au Puits de fous"	Laurent Bru	Julien Fournet	TBA	TBA
The Mini Jungle Bunch fall into the Loony Well. Down there, they try to free the princess of the realm, kept prisoner by Totor.
114	8	"The Dogs in the Reservoir" "Les Chiens du Réservoir"	Benoît Somville	Julien Fournet; Davy Mourier	TBA	TBA
The kiwis ask the Jungle Bunch for help when a gang of hyenas start stealing their food.
115	9	"The Jungled" "Les Junglés"	Laurent Bru	Julien Fournet	TBA	TBA
Victor, the Jungle Bunch's biggest fan, asks the Great Warrior Tiger about their very first adventure. Maurice tells him the full story of how the team met.
116	10	"From Dusk 'Till Yawn" "Une nuit en Amphore"	Benoît Somville	Julien Fournet	TBA	TBA
Will Al and Bob be able to overcome their love for insects and not eat a single one for an entire day? Batricia bets that they won't be able to, but the bet has some unexpected consequences.
117	11	"Invasion of the Carrot Snatchers" "L'Invasion des Profanateurs d'Agriculture"	Laurent Bru	Julien Fournet	TBA	TBA
The rabbits' territory is surrounded by explosive mushrooms and carnivorous plants after Marla and Roger mix up some seeds! Can the Jungle Bunch save the day?
118	12	"My Son, My Hero" "Mon Fils, Ce Héros"	Benoît Somville	Julien Fournet	TBA	TBA
Maurice decides to go on a mission all by himself to prove to his mother Natasha that he is a grown-up and can manage without her constantly protecting him.
119	13	"Melina's Independence Day" "Le jour de l'indépendance de Mélina"	Laurent Bru	Julien Fournet	TBA	TBA
Melina returns with an evil plan to become empress of the jungle! The Jungle Bunch must act quickly if they are to stop her...
120	14	"Last Cave on the Left" "La Dernière Grotte sur la Gauche"	Benoît Somville	Julien Fournet; Kevin Païs	TBA	TBA
Junior and Lola discover that a bunch of moles are stealing Lola's grandfather's fruits!
121	15	"Once Upon a Time, in the Jungle" "Il était une fois dans la Jungle"	Laurent Bru	Julien Fournet; Kévin Païs	TBA	TBA
Al and Bob fall into the trap of a crocodile who plans to have them as a meal! Can they escape in time?
122	16	"Moms Are Off-Limits" "On a dit pas les mamans"	Benoît Somville	Julien Fournet	TBA	TBA
It's Mother's Day and the Jungle Bunch are busy preparing their gifts. But their moms have been hypnotized by the snake Dhoom and forced to destroy all the mammal villages!
123	17	"Irresistible" "Irrésistible"	Laurent Bru	Nicolas Robin; Hervé Benedetti	TBA	TBA
While picking up different flowers for a gift for Batricia, Gilbert finds himself covered with very powerful pheromones.
124	18	"The Fifth Magnet" "Le Cinquième Aimant"	Benoît Somville	Julien Fournet; Nicolas Robin; Hervé Benedetti	TBA	TBA
Closely followed by a group of invasive fans led by Victor, the Jungle Bunch are facing a giant magnet that created Ernest, the wacky inventor.
125	19	"The Clash of the Herbal Teas" "Le Choc des Tisanes"	Laurent Bru	Kevin Païs	TBA	TBA
Natasha takes Junior to a village led by grandmas, where they are forced to take part in chamomile tea and knitting workshops.
126	20	"Princess Monochromed" "Princesse Monochromée"	Benoît Somville	Julien Fournet	TBA	TBA
Under the threat of princess Capriciella, Salvador is forced to paint her portrait.
127	21	"The Slider Surfer" "Le Surfeur d'Argan"	Laurent Bru	Julien Fournet; Kevin Païs	TBA	TBA
Goliath is sad - he doesn't feel young anymore. To cheer him up, Junior takes him to spend a little time with his friends.
128	22	"A Clock for Orange" "Orange Organique"	Benoît Somville	David Alaux; Éric Tosti; Jean-François Tosti	TBA	TBA
Maurice and Roger have an hour to make an antidote to the toxic painting that covers their body!
129	23	"21 Jungle Street"	Laurent Bru	Julien Fournet	TBA	TBA
After mysterious robberies at school, Maurice puts his schoolbag on and decides to infiltrate the place.
130	24	"12 Cold Monkeys" "L'Enrhumée des 12 Singes"	Benoît Somville	Julien Fournet	TBA	TBA
The monkeys' village is plagued by an epidemic of cold. As Ernest is convinced that his brand new time machine will save the day, the Jungle Bunch go for searching an antidote.
131	25	"Holy Gravy" "Sacré Graillon"	Laurent Bru	Cédric Bacconnier	TBA	TBA
Merlinou the wizard comes to meet Bob.
132	26	"The Bush Brothers" "Les Brousse Brothers"	Benoît Somville	Nicolas Robin; Hervé Benedetti	TBA	TBA
Fred is sad - he's lost track of his old band members. The Jungle Bunch decides to surprise him and try to find the musicians.
133	27	"Bad Luck Ernest" "Les Malheurs d'Ernest"	Laurent Bru	Kevin Païs	TBA	TBA
During a 'guess who' game, the Jungle Bunch think back to all of the crazy inventions created by Ernest the kiwi.
134	28	"Flight of the Flamingos" "L'Envol des Flamants Roses"	Benoît Somville	Sophie Caron	TBA	TBA
Gilbert and Batricia's families meet for the first time, but nothing goes as planned!
135	29	"Tiger and Grumpy" "Tigre et Crognon"	Laurent Bru	David Alaux; Éric Tosti; Jean-François Tosti	TBA	TBA
Maurice and Junior go to Natasha's place for a holiday.
136	30	"Special Convoy" "50 Nuances de Matière Grise"	Benoît Somville	Julien Fournet	TBA	TBA
Gilbert has accidentally created a bomb capable of destroying the jungle! Can the gang get rid of the dangerous weapon before it's too late?
137	31	"Who Framed Ronald the Elephant?" "Mais qui veut la peau de Ronald d'Éléphant?"	Laurent Bru	Kevin Païs	TBA	TBA
Ronald the elephant arrives in a panic - he is being pursued by a group of mandrills who plan to kidnap the king!
138	32	"Neverending Party" "Le Jour des Marmottes"	Benoît Somville	Julien Fournet	TBA	TBA
Miguel is asked to be the guest of honour at "Groundhog Day".
139	33	"Not so Amusant Park" "Fatale Attraction"	Laurent Bru	Julien Fournet	TBA	TBA
Junior and Miguel spend the afternoon at Mickey the jerboa's amusement park. He says he has changed and he wants to make up for his past misdeeds - but is he being genuine?
140	34	"The Gorilla and the Queen" "Le Gorille et la Reine"	Benoît Somville	Cédric Bacconnier	TBA	TBA
Miguel accidentally finds himself guardian of the 'cup ceremony' - an event that could prevent war between two rival hamster villages. Can he hold things together and restore peace?
141	35	"Coaching Tiger, Hidden Giraffe" "Karaté Tigre"	Part 1 + 3: Laurent Bru Part 2: Benoît Somville	Julien Fournet	TBA	TBA
142	36	"Coaching Tiger, Hidden Giraffe" "Karaté Tigre"	Part 1 + 3: Laurent Bru Part 2: Benoît Somville	Julien Fournet	TBA	TBA
143	37	"Coaching Tiger, Hidden Giraffe" "Karaté Tigre"	Part 1 + 3: Laurent Bru Part 2: Benoît Somville	Julien Fournet	TBA	TBA
Part 1: A symbol of yin and yang appears in the sky. This is a sign that Pong To, the greatest kung fu master of the jungle, is back to face the heir of his former disciple, Natasha, in a fight to the death... Part 2: Maurice remembers his training with kung fu master Hector. He there learned the greatest lesson of all: humility. There is still a chance to defeat Pong To, which lies at the bottom of the Well of Truth... Part 3: At the edge of the volcano where Pong To is waiting, no-one can resist the Master's power. Nobody, except Junior. Is it is actually him that Pong To came to face?
144	38	"Kitchen With a Plot" "Cuisine et Manigances"	Benoît Somville	Nicolas Robin; Hervé Benedetti	TBA	TBA
After a popular restaurant is destroyed by a falling tree, the Jungle Bunch offer to step in - but running a restaurant turns out to be a lot harder than they thought it would be!
145	39	"Nutter Island" "Deux au Monde"	Laurent Bru	Kevin Païs	TBA	TBA
Maurice and El Popo are stranded on a desert island! Can they find a way to escape?
146	40	"Benny's Misfortunes" "Les Malheurs de Benny"	Benoît Somville	Julien Fournet	TBA	TBA
147	41	"The Mini Bunch at Kidwarts" "Les Mini As à Foudlart"	Laurent Bru	Hélène Blanchard	TBA	TBA
148	42	"Jungle Daylight" "Au Bout du Tunnel"	Benoît Somville	David Alaux; Éric Tosti; Jean-François Tosti	TBA	TBA
149	43	"Rise of the Saltwater" "Piège en eau Salée"	Laurent Bru	Kevin Païs	TBA	TBA
150	44	"Jungle Academy" "Jungle Académie"	Benoît Somville	Julien Fournet	TBA	TBA
151	45	"Thump, Miguel Thump!" "Tape Miguel Tape!"	Laurent Bru	Julien Fournet	TBA	TBA
TBA
152	46	"The Champions to the Rescue" "Les Fortiches à la Rescousse"	Benoît Somville	David Alaux; Éric Tosti; Jean-François Tosti	TBA	TBA
TBA
153	47	"She, Fugitive" "La Fugitive"	Laurent Bru	Kevin Païs	TBA	TBA
154	48	"Fab and Furious" "Faste et Furieux"	Benoît Somville	Kevin Païs	TBA	TBA
TBA
155	49	"The Jungle Blob" "Une Journée avec les As"	Laurent Bru	Julien Fournet	TBA	TBA
TBA
156	50	"Pirates of the Cahouetes" "Pirates des Cahouètes"	Benoît Somville	Hélène Blanchard	TBA	TBA
TBA
157	51	"V for Veteran" "Vieux pour Vendetta"	Benoît Daffis	David Alaux; Éric Tosti; Jean-François Tosti	TBA	TBA
TBA
158	52	"Catch My Cake if You Can" "Attrape Mon Gâteau si Tu Peux"	Floriane Caserio	Kevin Païs	TBA	TBA
TBA
