= Astro Kid =

2019 French computer-animated science-fiction film

- French theatrical release poster
- French: Terra Willy, planète inconnue
- Directed by: Éric Tosti
- Written by: David Alaux; Éric Tosti; Jean-François Tosti
- Produced by: Jean-François Tosti
- Starring: Timothé Vom Dorp; Édouard Baer; Barbara Tissier; Marie-Eugénie Maréchal; Guillaume Lebon
- Edited by: Jean-Christian Tiassy; Hélène Blanchard
- Music by: Oliver Cussac
- Production companies: TAT Productions; Master Films; France 3 Cinema; Logical Pictures; France Télévisions; OCS; Ciné+
- Distributed by: BAC Films
- Release date: 5 April 2019
- Running time: 90 minutes
- Country: France
- Language: French
- Box office: $4.3 million

Astro Kid (French: Terra Willy, planète inconnue, lit. 'Terra Willy, unknown planet') is a 2019 French animated science-fiction film directed and written by Éric Tosti with the participation of the co-writers David Alaux and Jean-François Tosti. The plot concerns on a young boy named Willy, who after the destruction of his ship, gets separated from his parents and lands on an unexplored planet, where he must survive until the arrival of a rescue mission.

== Synopsis ==
Following the destruction of their ship, a 10-year-old boy called Willy is separated from his parents with whom he traveled through space. His rescue capsule lands on a wild and unexplored planet. With the help of Buck, a survival robot, he will have to hold on until the arrival of a rescue mission. Meanwhile, they meet an eight legged lizard-like alien named Flash, with whom they become friends, and together they discover the planet, its fauna, its flora... but also its dangers.

== Voice cast ==
=== English Dub ===
- Landen Beattie as Willy
- Jason Canning as Buck
- Susan Myers as Probe
- Laura Post as Willy's Mother
- Keith Silverstein as Willy's Father

=== French Dub ===
- Timothé Vom Dorp as Willy
- Édouard Baer as Buck
- Barbara Tissier as Probe
- Marie-Eugénie Maréchal as Willy's Mother
- Guillaume Lebon as Willy's Father

== Production ==
Terra Willy is the second feature film from the Toulouse-based studio TAT Productions to be released in theatres, after The Jungle Bunch. Shortly after his previous film release in July 2017, TAT announced its production of Astro Kid with a team of 70 people and having a budget of €6 million.

The movie was animated using 3ds Max and rendered using VRay. Some of the render tests used Substance Designer on their own for textures. The team used 3ds Max pipeline because of the most common plugins like Ornatrix and Forest. The studio only had three developers for internal tools that were mostly used for plugging any holes in the usage design of the forest planet to use UDIMs for the first time. Substance Painter was used in a new way resulting in loading all the UDIMs and being able to bake all the maps in one place alongside UV and surfacing on ZBrush. These were later exported to Autodesk software alongside materials for the hard surfacing, for metals, paints, plastics, rubbers and for the background props modelling.

== Reception ==
The film received generally positive reviews from critics, and on Rotten Tomatoes, the film holds an approval rating of 100% from 11 reviews.

Tom Cassidy of Common Sense Media gave the film four stars out of five, saying "an animated alien adventure has learning, empathy, teamwork." Leslie Felperin of The Guardian give a rate of the film three stars out of five, saying that the animation is "fluent and densely rendered, although sometimes the characters have less subtlety than their surrounding environment. But, compared with the relentlessly noisy animated features coming out of Hollywood, this is refreshingly old-school and innocent." He also noted that the film is "meant to teach kids about self-reliance, cooperation, the value of outdoor adventure and risk-taking; and the obligatory environmental sentimentalism is also present and correct." Larushka Ivan-Zadeh of The Times rated the film also three stars out of five, stating that the film has "a neat underlying message about how children, forcibly unplugged from technology and overprotective parents, will survive and thrive." She also said that the film's narrative has "heart-tugging boy-and-dog tale lacks in [its] momentum, it makes up for in wondrous diversion." Starburst Magazine's Laura Griffiths rated the film six out of ten, writing that the film's animation is "wonderful and the environments which Director Éric Tosti and co. have created offer an exciting Technicolor landscape of weird and wonderful wildlife." Though, she also wrote that the voice acting is a "tad iffy," but overall, she concluded "a good story of survival with plenty of fun moments along the way."

A year later, Sandra Hall of The Sydney Morning Herald gave the film a rate of 3½ stars, saying that "a film crafted expressly for small children, but it has subtleties."

== See also ==
- List of films with a 100% rating on Rotten Tomatoes
- The Jungle Bunch (film)–the previous feature film by TAT Productions
