= Éric Tosti =

French film director, writer and producer

- Born: Éric Tosti; 9 June 1972 (age 54); Perpignan, France
- Other name: Eric Tosti
- Occupations: Film director; writer; producer
- Years active: 1999–present

Éric Tosti (born 9 June 1972) is a French film director, writer and producer. He wrote and directed the feature films Spike (2008), The Jungle Bunch: The Movie (2011), Spike's Reindeer Rescue (2012), Terra Willy (2019) and Epic Tails (2022). He also directed the television series Spike: The World of Santa Claus (2008) and The Jungle Bunch: News Beat (2011).

== Career ==
In 2000, he co-founded the digital animation TAT Productions with his brother Jean-François.

== Filmography ==
=== Feature films ===
| Year | Title | Role | Notes |
|---|---|---|---|
| 2023 | The Jungle Bunch: Operation Meltdown | writer | |
| 2022 | Epic Tails | writer and director | Director Participation |
| 2021 | Pil's Adventures | producer | |
| 2019 | Terra Willy | director | Eric Tosti as Director |
| 2017 | The Jungle Bunch | writer | |
| 2012 | Spike's Reindeer Rescue | co-writer and co-director | TV movie |
| 2011 | The Jungle Bunch: The Movie | writer and director | TV movie |
| 2008 | Spike | writer and director | TV movie |

=== Short films ===
| Year | Title | Role | Notes |
|---|---|---|---|
| 2002 | Le voeu | writer and director | |
| 2000 | Al and Bob | co-writer and co-director | |
| 1999 | Mon copain? | writer, director and producer | |

=== Television series ===
| Year | Title | Role | Notes |
|---|---|---|---|
| 2015-2020 | The Jungle Bunch | writer | Éric Tosti as Creator |
| 2011 | The Jungle Bunch: News Beat | director | Éric Tosti as Creator |
| 2008 | Spike: The World of Santa Claus | writer and director | |
