= Chip 'n' Dale: Park Life =

French animated television series

- Promotional poster
- Genre: Comedy; Slapstick
- Based on: Chip 'n' Dale by Bill Justice
- Directed by: Jean Cayrol; Frédéric Martin (season 2); Khalil Ben Namaane (season 2)
- Voices of: Matthew Géczy; Kaycie Chase; Cindy Lee Delong; Bill Farmer; Sylvain Caruso; David Gasman
- Composer: Vincent Artaud
- Country of origin: France
- Original languages: English; French
- No. of seasons: 2
- No. of episodes: 30 (90 segments) (list of episodes)

Production
- Executive producer: Marc du Pontavice
- Producer: Marc du Pontavice
- Running time: 22 minutes
- Production company: Xilam Animation

Original release
- Network: Disney+
- Release: July 28, 2021 – May 22, 2024

Chip 'n' Dale: Park Life (French: Les Aventures au Parc de Tic et Tac) is a French animated television series based on the cartoon characters Chip 'n' Dale. The series is produced by Xilam Animation for Walt Disney EMEA Productions Limited. It premiered on Disney+ on July 28, 2021. Unlike other iterations of the characters, the series is non-verbal, similar to other shows produced by Xilam.

On June 15, 2022, it was announced the series was renewed for a second season, which premiered on May 22, 2024. A Christmas special was released on December 20, 2023.

== Voice cast ==
- Matthew Géczy as Chip
- Kaycie Chase as Dale
- Cindy Lee Delong as Clarice, Fifi and Pluto's pups
- Bill Farmer as Pluto. Farmer is the only English voice cast member from the Mickey Mouse universe to reprise his role in the series.
- Sylvain Caruso as Donald Duck
- David Gasman as Beagle Boys, Butch
- Sybille Tureau as Daisy Duck
- Laurent Pasquier as Mickey Mouse
- Marie-Charlotte Leclaire as Minnie Mouse
- Emmanuel Curtil as Goofy

Gyro Gearloose, Little Helper, Peg-Leg Pete, Poe de Spell and Huey, Dewey, and Louie also appear in the second season.

== Episodes ==
Season	Segments	Episodes	Originally released	
Season	Segments	Episodes	First released	Last released
1	36	12	July 28, 2021	October 13, 2021
2	54	18	May 24, 2023	May 22, 2024

== Production ==
Director Jean Cayrol stated, "That show is based on the version of the animated short from the 40s and 50s, so we wanted to base the relationship on that, but also, we wanted to root the show into the 21st century and have this very modern feel, so that’s why they are now living in a treehouse in the middle of a park in the middle of a modern gigantic city. I think that’s what they needed to be rooted in nowadays and make them even more relatable."

Chip 'n' Dale: Park Life was renewed for a second season in June 2022.

== Release ==
Chip 'n' Dale: Park Life premiered on Disney+ on July 28, 2021. In the United States, the series debuted on Disney Channel on January 9, 2023, and on Disney XD on January 14, 2023, on linear television, making it the first Xilam animated series to air in the United States since KidsClick aired Oggy and the Cockroaches in 2019. The second season was released on May 24, 2023, on Disney+. The second batch of season two episodes were released on August 30, 2023. The third and final batch of season two episodes were released on May 22, 2024.

== Reception ==
On review aggregator Rotten Tomatoes, the series has a rating of 80% based on reviews from 5 critics.

Kristy Puchko of IGN gave the series a grade of eight out of ten and found it to be a refreshing interpretation of Chip and Dale, while praising the animation and complimenting the humor of the show. Ashley Moulton of Common Sense Media rated Chip 'n' Dale: Park Life three out of five stars, complimented the presence of positive messages and role models, citing friendship and curiosity, and found the series entertaining across its humor.

Jenna Anderson of ComicBook.com gave the series a grade of three out of five, acclaimed the animation style, and complimented the performances of the voice actors, but stated that the series is narratively too simplified. Kevin John Siazon of Today's Parent included Chip 'n' Dale: Park Life in their "6 Must-Watch Disney Plus Shows And Movies Coming In July 2021" list, calling it a "modern take on Disney's classic non-verbal slapstick comedy."
