= Pattie and the Wrath of Poseidon =

2022 animated film directed by David Alaux

- French theatrical release poster
- Directed by: David Alaux
- Written by: David Alaux; Jean-François Tosti; Éric Tosti
- Produced by: Jean-François Tosti
- Starring: Kaycie Chase; Christophe Lemoine; Emmanuel Curtil; Pierre Richard
- Edited by: Magali Batut; Perrine Bekaert; Jean-Christian Tassy
- Music by: Olivier Cussac
- Production companies: TAT Productions; Kinology; Frances 3 Cinéma
- Distributed by: Apollo Films (France); StudioCanal (United Kingdom); Viva Kids (United States)
- Release dates: October 26, 2022 (Montpellier Mediterranean Film Festival); January 25, 2023 (France); February 10, 2023 (United Kingdom); April 5, 2024 (United States)
- Running time: 95 minutes
- Country: France
- Language: French
- Box office: $15 million

Pattie and the Wrath of Poseidon (French: Pattie et la Colère de Poséidon) (released in English as Epic Tails as well as Argonuts in some territories) is a 2022 animated adventure film directed by David Alaux. The film stars the voices of Kaycie Chase, Christophe Lemoine, Emmanuel Curtil and Pierre Richard.

The film premiered at the 2022 edition of the Montpellier Mediterranean Film Festival in Montpellier, France on October 26, 2022, before being released in France on January 25, 2023. After a long theatrical release throughout 2023, the film was finally released in the United States as a limited release on April 5, 2024, by Viva Kids.

While the original French version was well received, the English version of the film received mixed reviews, with critics praising the animation, soundtrack, and emotional themes but criticised the screenplay and English voice performances. However, it was a success and grossed $15 million worldwide.

== Plot ==
In the city of Yolcos, 80 years after Jason and the Argonauts’ voyage, the Golden Fleece has managed to bring peace and harmony to the community as well as the animals. Pattie, a young mouse who idolises Jason, wishes to have her own adventures, much to her peers’ concern and amusement, the former mostly from her adoptive cat father, Sam, who wishes for her safety. As a young adult, Pattie’s dreams have begun to fade. She wishes to go to Alexandria to see its library, and on the day she wins the lottery for the trip, Sam eats the ticket. Jason announces a statue in honour of Zeus who protects the city through the Golden Fleece. Due to Zeus’ constant boasting, he angers Poseidon, who removes the Golden Fleece and threatens the citizens with a tsunami unless they build him a statue, complete with a shiny trident.

Due to the Golden Fleece’s absence, the communities erupt into panic. Pattie finds a map of an island called Trinactos, an island filled with treasures and notably has a large sapphire with three branches, resembling a trident. A pirate seagull named Chickos confirms the island’s existence. Sam gives the map to Jason, who announces his quest to Trinactos and encourages the city to work together to build the statue. Using a magical dragon’s tooth, Pattie manages to resurrect the deceased Argonauts. Seeing Pattie’s intelligence, Chickos invites Pattie to help him guide Jason and the Argonauts to Trinactos. Scared for Pattie’s safety, Sam inadvertently joins them. The gods (mostly Zeus) cause problems for the crew by creating a huge storm and letting loose a baby Kraken onto them. The kraken sneezes all over the ship, causing Sam to throw up and reveal the Alexandria ticket, greatly upsetting Pattie.

Due to the ship’s great damage, the crew stops in Syracuse where Pattie tearfully disowns Sam. After the ship is fixed, the crew leaves without him. Full of regret and wishing for Pattie’s forgiveness, Sam asks some local gangster rats to help him get to Trinactos. The crew, meanwhile, arrives at Trinactos only to find no sapphire and are ambushed by a clan of cyclopses who kidnap Jason and the Argonauts with the intention of eating them. Pattie and Chickos follow them where they discover a forge. Sam arrives at Trinactos and meets two young mouse siblings named John and Terry who introduce him to a trio of scorpions, Bernardo, Gerardo and Theresa who have looked after the two since they have been stranded on the island. Pattie discovers that the map is a trap set by the cyclopses when she discovers copies of the map made and sent out into the sea in bottles. At the same time, the scorpions show Sam a graveyard of shipwrecks from travelers who used the map to find treasure but instead their ships were sunk and the castaways were eaten by the cyclopses. They discover that John and Terry’s parents were killed from one of the ships sinking. Realizing that the sapphire isn’t real, Pattie and Chickos are attacked by a hydra but are saved when Sam arrives and sacrifices himself, causing him to be taken by the cyclops leader Grumos.

Meanwhile in Yolcos, the citizens are on the verge of giving up due to the stress and heat until Luigi, Pattie’s best friend, unites the animals to bring water to the humans, thus also uniting the two communities. Back in Trinactos, Pattie reconciles with Sam in his cage where he apologizes for his actions, knowing that she was never meant to have a normal life and that he ended up making her feel caged. Pattie forgives Sam and frees him. Still believing that they can save Yolcos, Pattie plans to free the Argonauts and make their own trident using the forge. Chickos, John and Terry hijack the cyclopses’ giant robot whilst Pattie, Sam and the scorpions subdue the hydra by making it regrow too many heads, and make the trident. After blowing up the forge, the crew get the cyclopses to chase after them (during this, the Argonauts free themselves). The crew ambushes the cyclopses with their robot causing them to flee as the sun rises, turning them into trees. Grumos tries to make a last stand to stop them from leaving but is defeated when Pattie gets the sun to shine on him, turning him into a tree. Sam adopts John and Terry and the crew leave for Yolcos where they arrive just before Poseidon can wipe away the city. Pleased with his statue, Poseidon stops the tsunami and gives them back the Golden Fleece. While Jason is hailed as the hero by the city, the animals celebrate Pattie as the true hero.

In a mid-credits scene, Sam and the rats give Pattie a ticket to Alexandria. At the docks, the gangster rats reappear for Sam’s debt from the favor his asked them to get to Trinactos. They introduce to him Graziella, a rat with a terrible singing voice for him to make a star in which he, John and Terry stow away with Pattie to Alexandria as the gods gleefully plan to set obstacles for them.

== Cast ==
- Kaycie Chase as Pattie, a highly intelligent and adventurous mouse.
  - Sonja Ball as Pattie (English dub)
  - Ellie Zeiler as Pattie (US release)
- Christophe Lemoine as Sam, Pattie’s overprotective yet loving adoptive cat father.
  - Mark Camacho as Sam (English dub)
- Emmanuel Curtil as Chickos, a pirate seagull who guides the crew to Trinactos.
  - Wyatt Bowen as Chickos (English dub)
- Michel Tureau as Jason, the aging leader of the Argonauts. It is implied that he is 100 years old as the movie is set around 80 years after the quest for the Golden Fleece.
  - Terrence Scammell as Jason (English dub)
- Paul Borne as Poseidon, the hothead Greek god of the sea and Zeus’s brother.
  - Terrence Scammell as Poseidon (English dub)
  - Rob Beckett as Poseidon (UK release)
- Pierre Richard as Zeus, the boastful Greek god of the sky as well as the King of the Gods and Poseidon’s brother.
  - Josh Widdicombe as Zeus (UK release)
- Frantz Confiac as Bernardo, a male scorpion Pattie’s crew befriends on Trinactos.
  - Kwasi Songui as Bernardo (English dub)
- Jérôme Pauwels as Gerardo, another male scorpion Pattie’s crew befriends on Trinactos.
  - Patrick Abellard as Gerardo (English dub)
  - Pauwels also voices Vito, a gangster rat Sam meets in Syracuse.
- Arthur Raynal as Luigi, a brown rat who aspires to be a ninja and is Pattie’s best friend.
  - Wyatt Bowen as Luigi (English dub)
- Tom Trouffier as Tony, a brown rat who occasionally bullies Pattie.
- Aloïs Le Labourier Tiêu as John, a young mouse Pattie’s crew befriends on Trinactos.
  - Oscar Vaillancourt as John (English dub)
- Juliette Davis as Terry, John’s younger sister.
  - Talulah Dinsmore as Terry (English dub)
- Serge Biavan as Grumos, the chief of a clan of Cyclopses.
  - Marcel Jeannin as Grumos (English dub)
- Pascal Casanova as Krados, another cyclops.
  - Richard M. Dumont as Krados (English dub)
- Céline Monsarrat as Maitès, a female cyclops.
  - Pauline Little as Maités (English dub)
- Emmanuel Garijo as Apollo, the Greek God of oracles.
  - Garijo also provides additional voices.
  - Rob Beckett as Apollo (UK release)
- Julien Bouanich as Hermes, the Greek messenger God.
  - Josh Widdecombe as Hermes (UK release)
- Barbara Tissier as Aphrodite, the Greek Goddess of love.
  - Giovanna Fletcher as Aphrodite (UK release)
- Valérie Siclay as Hera, the Greek Goddess of women, Queen of the Gods, and Zeus’ wife and sister.
  - Giovanna Fletcher as Hera (UK release)
  - Siclay also provides additional voices.
- Magali Rosenzweig as Theresa, a female scorpion.
- Michel Mella as Carmine, a rat crime lord. He is a parody of Vito Corleone from The Godfather.
- Jérémy Prévost as Flippant the Dolphin (Creeper in the English dub).
  - Prévost also voices a young man in Syracuse.
- Maëlle Bonnet as Yvette the Owl, Pattie’s teacher.
- Franck Gourlat and Vincent Ronsse as additional voices
- Bruce Dinsmore, Angela Galuppo and Pauline Little as additional voices (English dub)

== Release ==
Pattie and the Wrath of Poseidon premiered at the Montpellier Mediterranean Film Festival on October 26, 2022, and was released in France a year later on January 25, 2023 by Apollo Films and in the United Kingdom on February 10, 2023 by StudioCanal. The movie was later given a limited theatrical release in the United States on April 5, 2024 by Viva Pictures, under their Viva Kids lable.

== Reception ==
The film gained mixed-to-negative reviews, with people praising it for its unique premise, memorable characters, and animation quality, while others finding the voice performances too generic, annoying songs, and weak pacing. It even got a 5.8/10 rating in IMDb

Ed Potton of The Times rated the film 3/5 and wrote, "..it stays afloat through sheer bonkers chutzpah, as a mouse called Pattie and a superannuated Jason board the Argo on a quest to find a trident for Poseidon."

Wendy Ide of The Observer rated 2/5 and wrote "The decent quality of the animation of this English-language French production is rather let down by some shockingly poor voice performances and a couple of ear-bleeding musical numbers."

Cathy Clarke of The Guardian rated 2/5 and wrote "The cinema I was in was almost full with under-sevens and their grownups; it was silent but for munching, not one scene had them giggling in their booster seats."
