= Funky Cops =

- Genre: Action comedy Buddy cop
- Created by: Thierry Sapyn
- Directed by: Thierry Sapyn; Franck Michel
- Voices of: Emmanuel Curtil; Med Hondo; Lionel Henry
- Opening theme: "Let's Boogie" by DJ Abdel
- Composers: DJ Abdel; Bustafunk
- Country of origin: France
- Original language: French
- No. of seasons: 2
- No. of episodes: 39

Production
- Executive producers: Christophe Di Sabatino; Eric Garnet
- Producer: Joanna Ruer
- Running time: 26 minutes
- Production companies: Antefilms Production; M6-Métropole Télévision; TPS Cinéma; Greenlight Media AG

Original release
- Network: M6
- Release: 4 May 2002 – 6 June 2004

Funky Cops is an animated series about two cops in San Francisco during the 1970s.

== Production ==
The show was created by brothers Christophe and Benoit Di Sabatino and produced by Antefilms Production. In the US, it was licensed by 4Kids Entertainment and aired on the FoxBox (later renamed 4Kids TV), but this now-rare version was short-lived.

A "Funky Cops II" was in production by Antefilms.

== Plot ==
Ace Anderson and Dick Kowalski ("Jack Kowalski" in the 4Kids version) are two semi-competent cops in San Francisco during the late 1970s. They show more attention towards appearing cool and disco dancing, but finish the cases by the end of the day. They are assisted by their disgruntled police chief Captain Dobbs, plucky reporter Miss Lee, fellow disco lover Boogaloo, and an additional officer called Flora "Fly" Ibanez in the second season.

== Cast ==
Character	Actor		
Character	French	English	
Character	French	Elude Sound Services	4Kids Entertainment
Dick Kowalski	Emmanuel Curtil	David Gasman	Jack Kowalski
Dick Kowalski	Emmanuel Curtil	David Gasman	Andrew Rannells
Ace Anderson	Med Hondo (1st voice)	Thomas Pollard	Reginald Metcalf
Ace Anderson	Lionel Henry (2nd voice)	Thomas Pollard	Reginald Metcalf
Captain Dobbs	Richard Darbois	David Gasman	Frederick B. Owens
Boogaloo	Serge Faliu	David Gasman	Eric Stuart
Miss Lee	Claire Guyot	Jodi Forrest	Lisa Ortiz
Wang Bang	Jean-Claude Donda	Allan Wenger	unknown
Luigi Carbonara	Patrick Guillemin	James Shuman	unknown
Parker	Patrick Guillemin	Allan Wenger	Brian Wilson
Walker	Jean-Claude Donda	James Shuman	Dave Wills
Dobbs's Wife		Sharon Mann-Vallet	Soraya Butler
Mike the Mechanic		James Shuman	unknown
Judge		Allan Wenger	Eric Stuart
Flora "Fly" Ibanez	Fily Keita	Mirabelle Kirkland	N/A

Additional voices (French): Jean-Claude Donda, Serge Faliu, Patrick Guillemin, Claire Guyot, Nathalie Spitzer

Additional voices (English, 4Kids): Greg Abbey, Maddie Blaustein, J. David Brimmer, James Cathcart, Kathleen Delaney, Darren Dunstan, Matthew George, Wayne Grayson, Dan Green, Damian Hill, Megan Hollingshead, Dillon James, Tara Jayne-Sands, Ted Lewis, Karen Neill, Andrew Paull, Kayzie Rogers, Sean Schemmel, Veronica Taylor, Tony Von Horne, Mike Pollock

Additional voices (English, Elude): Paul Bandey, Guillaume Barrière, Stephen Croce, Christine Flowers, Matthew Géczy, Mike Marshall, Douglas Rand, Barbara-Anne Weber-Scaff, Jesse Joe Walsh, Dana Westberg

== Episodes ==
=== Season 1 ===
# in series	# in season	French title/ English title (Elude); English title (4Kids)
1	1	"Un duo d'enfer"/ "All the Cars in San Francisco"
2	2	"Les Diamants ne sont pas éternels"/ "Jill Roy Was Here"; "Thief of Hearts"
3	3	"Protection Rapprochée"/ "A Fool's Errand"
4	4	"Gare au Gorille"/ "Help! There's a Gorilla in this Episode!"; "Day Care Detectives"
5	5	"Légende Vivante"/ "Long Live the King"
6	6	"Goldsinger"
7	7	"Un Alibi en béton"/ "Under Construction"
8	8	"Cache cash"/ "Funky Bankers"
9	9	"La Fin du Disco"/ "The End of Disco"
10	10	"Le "Kid" Dick"/ "The King of the Ring"
11	11	"Six ça suffit"/ "Blast from the Past"
12	12	"Discomatic"/ "Discomatic"; "Double Trouble"
13	13	"Le Dernier Slow"/ "A Woman Scorned"
14	14	"La Croisière ça use"/ "Cruising for Criminals"; "Cruise Control"
15	15	"Decibels Amazones"/ "Amazon Decibels"; "The Earth Mothers"
16	16	"Double Vie"/ "Double Life"; "Lady Knight"
17	17	"Le Blues de Noël"/ "Christmas Blues"; "And no Partridge in a Pear Tree"
18	18	"L'As des Astres"/ "Read my Mind"
19	19	"Les Evadés d'Alcatraz"/ "Jailbreak"; "Escape from Alcatraz"
20	20	"Méthode Zéro"/ "Method Madness"; "Director's Cut"
21	21	"Deux Flics à Monaco"/ "The French Disconnection"
22	22	"Chouchou Baby Love"/ "Choochoo Baby Love"; "False Idols"
23	23	"Boogaloo les bons tuyaux"/ "M For Melody"; "Something in the Air"
24	24	"Zéro du Conduite"/ "Back to School"
25	25	"Drôle de Drame 1"/ "Danger with the Rangers (Part 1)"
26	26	"Drôle de Drame 2"/ "Danger with the Rangers (Part 2)"

=== Season 2 ===
# in series	# in season	French title/ English title
27	1	"Retour de flamme"/ "Burn, Baby Burn"
28	2	"Ali Baba et les quarante Showgirls"/ "Ali Baba and the forty Showgirls"
29	3	"Freeze!"
30	4	"Pas de printemps pour les rouleaux"/ "No Spring for the Rolls"
31	5	"22 minutes chrono"/ "22"
32	6	"Vaudou sur la ville"/ "Hoo doo?... Voodoo!"
33	7	"Cops Story"
34	8	"L'homme aux fesses d'or"/ "Mr. Light End"
35	9	"L'escroc qui m'aimait"/ "The Bamboozler Who Loved Me"
36	10	"Panique à San Francisco"/ "Diamonds are for..."
37	11	"La créature de la baie"/ "Fins at Thunder Bay"
38	12	"La marque du phoque" / "The Mark of the Seal"
39	13	"Mickey Jackpot"

== Video games ==
In 2005, MoonScoop inked a deal with mobile publisher Overload to develop mobile phone games based on the series.

== Awards ==
Funky Cops was awarded Best European Program in 2003 at Cartoons on the Bay.
