= List of Chip 'n' Dale: Park Life episodes =

Chip 'n' Dale: Park Life is a French animated television series based on the cartoon characters Chip 'n' Dale. The series is co-produced by The Walt Disney Company France and Xilam Animation. It premiered on Disney+ on July 28, 2021.

The series was renewed for a second season, which premiered on May 24, 2023. On June 13, 2023, it was announced that more episodes of the series were ordered.

During the course of the series, 30 episodes of Chip 'n' Dale: Park Life were released over two seasons, between July 28, 2021, and May 2, 2024.

== Series overview ==
Season	Segments	Episodes	Originally released	
Season	Segments	Episodes	First released	Last released
1	36	12	July 28, 2021	October 13, 2021
2	54	18	May 24, 2023	May 22, 2024

== Episodes ==
=== Season 1 (2021) ===
No. overall	No. in season	Title	Written by	Storyboarded by	Original release date	Disney Channel air date	Prod. code	Viewers (millions)
1	1	"Thou Shalt Nut Steal" "Tu ne voleras point"	Frédéric Martin	Léa Cousty	July 28, 2021	January 9, 2023	101	0.11
1	1	"The Baby Whisperer" "Celui qui murmurait à l'oreille des bébés"	Léo Bocard	Guillaume Picard	July 28, 2021	January 9, 2023	101	0.11
1	1	"It Takes Two to Tangle" "Pour le meilleur et pour le pire"	Baljeet Rai & Jean Cayrol	Cédric Frémeaux & Nicolas Bougard	July 28, 2021	January 9, 2023	101	0.11
Dale takes acorns from a vendor cart protected by Pluto to feed himself and Chip, only for Chip to realize that they just took food from Pluto's pups. Pluto hunts them down for stealing the acorns. Chip and Dale bond with babies in the park playpen, but Chip has difficulty bonding with a particularly angry baby dressed in a unicorn onesie, accidentally causing a baby stampede in the process. Chip and Dale accidentally get their tails knitted together. When they do their usual businesses whilst still attached, Dale tries but fails to undo the knitting, leading Chip to believe that Dale doesn't want him anymore.
2	2	"The Whole Package" "La Valse des colis"	Hugo Gittard	Léa Cousty	August 4, 2021	January 10, 2023	102	N/A
2	2	"Bird Brains" "Cervelle de moineau"	Baljeet Rai & Frédéric Martin	Léa Cousty	August 4, 2021	January 10, 2023	102	N/A
2	2	"Acorn in My Side" "L'Envoûtement"	Frédéric Martin	Guillaume Picard	August 4, 2021	January 10, 2023	102	N/A
Chip gets obsessed to get a nut wrecker from a delivery locker while Dale tries to make the best of their time while waiting and gets delighted with the other contents they receive. Chip's good-intended actions makes him end up being banished from the park when a very suspicious Dale and the other park residents start to get afraid of his manners. Chip is unable to reach a mysterious upside down acorn from a dangerous branch Dale tries to keep him away from for his own safety, that becomes sinister and possibly supernatural and hypnotizes him to try to retrieve it. Dale tries to save him and now they must try to prevent themselves from being hypnotized by the entity.
3	3	"The Jungle" "La Jungle"	Hugo Gittard	Romain Cislo	August 11, 2021	January 11, 2023	103	N/A
3	3	"The Flight" "Le Vol"	Julien Dinse	Guillaume Picard	August 11, 2021	January 11, 2023	103	N/A
3	3	"Deep Dive" "En Profondeur"	Hugo Gittard	Léa Cousty	August 11, 2021	January 11, 2023	103	N/A
While trying to retrieve a fruit a couple of rabbits lost while playing, Chip and Dale get lost in a bush that looks like a jungle from the inside and impossible to find a way out for Chip, but not for Dale, and every attempt to show Chip the way out goes awry. Chip uses Dale to test different ways to reach a cherry tree planted in a building roof farther from the park by flying. Chip and Dale dive into the depths of the water pond to get a giant golden acorn they dropped, while ensuing in a battle of brains, with Chip trying to dive into his mind looking for solutions, and Dale deciding to think outside the box.
4	4	"A Nut You Can't Refuse" "Une Noisette qui ne se refuse pas"	Julien Dinse	Guillaume Picard	August 18, 2021	January 12, 2023	104	N/A
4	4	"Chipmunks Away" "Les Vacances de Tic & Tac"	Henry Gifford	Léa Cousty	August 18, 2021	January 12, 2023	104	N/A
4	4	"Ruff Justice" "Une Justice au poil"	Baljeet Rai & Jean Cayrol	Nicolas Bougard	August 18, 2021	January 12, 2023	104	N/A
Chip bribes Dale with nuts to do the home chores, causing him to become crazed over doing everything for nuts, but Chip gets in debt himself with the park mafia to get more nuts. Chip and Dale decide to have a vacation, but Chip's insistence to find a perfect place ends annoying Dale. Chip uses a policewoman's megaphone to scare bad guys and mean people away, but does that for misunderstandings and ends up getting into problems with Butch, who has stolen Pluto's bone.
5	5	"Dog in the House" "Une Vie de chien"	Baljeet Rai & Jean Cayrol	Cédric Frémeaux	August 25, 2021	January 13, 2023	105	N/A
5	5	"Cone Alone" "Jusqu'au cou"	Fanny Courtillot	Guillaume Picard	August 25, 2021	January 13, 2023	105	N/A
5	5	"Highway to Hugs" "L'Autoroute de l'amour"	Baljeet Rai & Frédéric Martin	Cédric Frémeaux & Nicolas Bougard	August 25, 2021	January 13, 2023	105	N/A
Pluto gets stuck in the Chip and Dale's tree when Chip steals his ball and Dale gets infatuated with him, making Chip jealous and angry at him. Dale decides to use a street cone to trick Chip he is sick so he can pamper him like Pluto's pups, but soon begins to regret his decision the hard way after Chip gets too worried for Dale's safety. Dale takes examples of a birthday party thrown by a couple of bikers to make a busy Chip hug him, but to no avail.
6	6	"The Hazelnut King" "Le Roi de la noisette"	Vincent Souchon	Guillaume Picard	September 1, 2021	January 16, 2023	106	N/A
6	6	"Egg Baby" "Le Bébé œuf"	Hugo Gittard	Léa Cousty	September 1, 2021	January 16, 2023	106	N/A
6	6	"Mega Muscle Chip" "Les Méga muscles de Tic"	Henry Gifford	Cédric Frémeaux	September 1, 2021	January 16, 2023	106	N/A
While trying to steal a hazelnut from a birthday cake guarded by Pluto, Chip and Dale get trapped in an inflatable castle and Dale believes he is the one and only king of the bouncy castle, so he becomes greedy and keeps the nut all to himself. Chip adopts a lost egg and while inside there is a cute but young, dangerous male snake, Chip still treats him as his son, but soon realizes the reality of the situation when he eats him and Dale. Chip realizes he's very weak, but a remote-controlled robot toy wrestler found in the sandlot makes him the strongest of the park, making Dale feel usurped.
7	7	"Struggling Duckling" "Le Vilain petit canard"	Fanny Courtillot	Romain Cislo	September 8, 2021	January 17, 2023	107	N/A
7	7	"Friends of the Family" "Les Amis de la famille"	Vincent Souchon	Léa Cousty	September 8, 2021	January 17, 2023	107	N/A
7	7	"Top Dog" "Bête à concours"	Fanny Courtillot	Guillaume Picard	September 8, 2021	January 17, 2023	107	N/A
In an attempt to keep warm, Chip and Dale try to bond with ducklings to protect themselves from the harsh winter by using disguises. While Dale fits in, Chip has a distinctively hard time to join them and keeps getting kicked out. Chip and Dale unintentionally become the thugs of the park mafia when they save its leader from a leaf vacuum cleaner and have fun with a spider turned weapon. Dale defeats both Pluto and Butch in a dog contest so he can eat the dog treats that come with the trophy, making him feel and act like a dog to Chip and Pluto loses his identity in the process, but his spirit is reignited when Butch captures Chip and Dale and re-challenges him.
8	8	"The Ghost" "Le Fantôme"	Léo Bocard & Alice Giordan	Léa Cousty	September 15, 2021	January 18, 2023	108	N/A
8	8	"The Imperfect Crime" "Le Crime presque parfait"	Julien Dinse	Romain Cislo	September 15, 2021	January 18, 2023	108	N/A
8	8	"Nut Soup" "Soupe de noisettes"	Vincent Souchon	Guillaume Picard	September 15, 2021	January 18, 2023	108	N/A
After being accidentally passed over and painted white in the street while everyone grants him as dead, Dale uses Chip to prank Butch, making him believe he is a ghost seeking revenge. A microphone tries to catch the chipmunk's sound and ends up losing its cover, that makes Chip and Dale believe that they accidentally killed another chipmunk, so they try to hide it. Chip and Dale compete themselves to impress the park residents with the best soup they've ever had and loved.
9	9	"The Usual Nutspects" "Détective à la noix"	Julien Dinse	Romain Cislo	September 22, 2021	January 19, 2023	109	N/A
9	9	"An Evening with Clarice" "Une Soirée avec Clarice"	Vincent Souchon	Léa Cousty	September 22, 2021	January 19, 2023	109	N/A
9	9	"Craft Craze" "Les Fous de la déco"	Hugo Gittard	Romain Cislo	September 22, 2021	January 19, 2023	109	N/A
Chip finds two acorns shaped like him and Dale so he decides it to put them as a special ornament, but when they mysteriously disappear, he and Dale try to find the guilty between the suspects around the crime scene: Clarice, Pluto and the park mafia's leader. Dale falls head over heels with Clarice's way of life and invites her to dinner. While Dale has a good time, Chip gets scared by her manners. When Chip accidentally destroys the home while mounting a picture and injures himself in the process, Dale tries to fix the house by himself using Chip's tool box while getting annoyed by Chip's unwanted (and dangerous) help when he abuses the toolbox by misunderstanding how they work.
10	10	"Too Late to Hibernate" "Mauvaise saison pour l'hibernation"	Hugo Gittard & Léo Bocard	Léa Cousty	September 29, 2021	January 20, 2023	110	N/A
10	10	"Sorry Nut Sorry" "Désolé, pas désolé"	Hugo Gittard	Romain Cislo	September 29, 2021	January 20, 2023	110	N/A
10	10	"Never Trust a Sausage" "Ne Jamais se fier d'une saucisse"	Hugo Gittard	Léa Cousty	September 29, 2021	January 20, 2023	110	N/A
While looking for some privacy on a hot summer day to cool down, Dale tries to makes Chip believe that winter has arrived and he needs to hibernate. When accidentally breaking their smartphone, Chip decides to blame a careless Dale without proof. Looking for a new couch, Chip and Dale wants to buy a toy from Pluto's yard sale, but when they take a sniff to the sausage in the hot dog Pluto wants in exchange, hilarity ensues.
11	11	"Night of the Pizza Moon" "Nuit de la Lune de Pizza"	Vincent Souchon	Romain Cislo	October 6, 2021	January 23, 2023	111	N/A
11	11	"Who's Your Granny?" "Qui est ta mamie ?"	Leo Bocard & Alice Giordan	Guillaume Picard	October 6, 2021	January 23, 2023	111	N/A
11	11	"Summer Sidekick Syndrome" "Dans l'ombre de Tic"	Leo Bocard & Alice Giordan	Guillaume Picard	October 6, 2021	January 23, 2023	111	N/A
Chip follows Clarice into the big city to find where she gets more food than he and Dale, but his plans go awry when Dale gets madly obsessed over pizzas and gets a fight with a Beagle Boy who stole a pizza. The mafia leader tricks Chip and Dale to move out of their home to bring space to his mother. The tender manners of the grandma chipmunk moves Dale, while Chip tries to do his best to pull her out of their home for good. During their summer vacation, Chip helps the other animals stay happy by using Dale as his sidekick, but the latter insists that Chip should do everything himself.
12	12	"Delivery Duck" "Le Canard livreur"	Simon Perrin	Romain Cislo	October 13, 2021	January 24, 2023	112	N/A
12	12	"Dark in the Park" "Un Parc dans la pénombre"	Simon Perrin	Guillaume Picard	October 13, 2021	January 24, 2023	112	N/A
12	12	"Choppin' Dale" "Tac le bûcheron"	Vincent Souchon	Romain Cislo	October 13, 2021	January 24, 2023	112	N/A
The chipmunks discover the wonder of food delivery, annoying Donald Duck, as long as he should bring the food to their house in the tree while avoiding the Beagle Boys. When Donald is stranded in the park at night, Chip and Dale try to get him to safety from a mob of hungry and ghostly raccoons that haunt the park in the dark and are after Donald's food. Dale accidentally gets the powers of a chainsaw after being electrocuted by one and begins to work with Donald in chopping the old trees in the park, while Chip gets profit on selling refugee to the animals that lost their homes in the process.

=== Season 2 (2023–24) ===
No. overall	No. in season	Title	Written by	Storyboarded by	Original release date	Prod. code
13	1	"The Martian Chipmunks" "Les écureuils martiens"	Nicole Paglia	Jean Cayrol & Olivier Pouchleon	May 24, 2023	201
13	1	"Two & a Half Chipmunks" "Deux écureuils et demi"	Jean Cayrol	Jean Cayrol & Olivier Pouchleon	May 24, 2023	201
13	1	"Koi Ride" "Balade en carpe"	Ayoola Solarin	Jean Cayrol & Olivier Pouchleon	May 24, 2023	201
While trying to reach a pool, a series of events involving Chip and Dale getting trapped in a telescope makes Chip mistakenly believe they were sent to Mars in a rocket when they actually ended up on a trash heap. Chip and Dale come across a young squirrel waiter that they take under their wing, but they soon discover that she's the park mafia leader's long-lost relative. Dale accidentally feeds Chip fish food and fears that it might transform and mutate Chip into a fish.
14	2	"Bee My Queen" "La reine des abeilles"	Jack Bernhardt	Jean Cayrol & Olivier Pouchleon	May 24, 2023	202
14	2	"Minimalism" "Minimalisme"	Evgenia Golubeva	Jean Cayrol & Olivier Pouchleon	May 24, 2023	202
14	2	"The Nutcracker" "Le casse-noisettes"	James Huntrods	Jean Cayrol & Olivier Pouchleon	May 24, 2023	202
After being wrapped in restriction tape put around a hole in their tree, Dale is mistaken for a replacement queen bee while the actual one is busy giving birth. Chip takes the tape to assume control of her bee colony, but when Chip becomes an easily annoyed dictator, Dale is forced to confront his friend. When their house becomes stuffed, Chip makes Dale clean up, causing Dale to become obsessed with cleaning out their tree, making the tree become empty, but trouble arises when Dale insists on getting rid of their prized nut. Dale comes across a spider-like alien who gives him a midnight snack and he becomes obsessed with the alien's return, with Chip not believing him.
15	3	"Café Con-Carnage"	Nicole Paglia	Olivier Pouchleon & Gaël Le Gourrierec	May 24, 2023	203
15	3	"Miracle Munk" "Écureuil miraculeux"	Jack Bernhardt	Jean Cayrol & Olivier Pouchleon	May 24, 2023	203
15	3	"Crime and Poultry" "Crime et volaille"	Nicole Paglia	Jean Cayrol & Olivier Pouchleon	May 24, 2023	203
After Chip's food scam doesn't fool the park mafia, the chipmunks' arguing is manipulated by the mafia into becoming gambling fodder. Dale's hugs somehow miraculously heal injuries, so he provides the service to all the park animals, but he discovers that by healing them, he gives away his life. Dale has grown a habit of eating other's food without permission, so Chip secretly decides to cover for his crimes by tricking the turkey judge. However, when Chip's cover is blown, he is sent to prison, and Dale tries to bust him out, but ultimately decides to give himself to the authorities instead and makes the best of it, while Chip plans to escape back home.
16	4	"Friends in Disguise" "Déguisements entre amis"	Jillian Goldfluss	Jean Cayrol & Olivier Pouchleon	May 24, 2023	204
16	4	"Down Memory Lane" "L'allée des souvenirs"	Jack Bernhardt	Khalil Ben Naamane	May 24, 2023	204
16	4	"Mini Golf Mayhem" "Chaos au minigolf"	Nicole Paglia	Frédéric Martin	May 24, 2023	204
After getting disgusted of their characteristics, Chip and Dale each go in disguise to clubs that only allow a specific type of animal in, but keep ending up meeting each other. Chip and Dale look through old photos in their photo album, but they keep both remembering those events differently in an absurd manner from their point of view, especially the recent ones. Dale and his friends spend all night partying at Donald's miniature golf course and people pay admission to see them; the money-crazed Donald then enslaves them into continuing to party forever, while Chip attempts to get Dale to go to bed.
17	5	"Tap That Sap" "Le déménagement"	James Huntrods	Anh Tu Cao	May 24, 2023	205
17	5	"Cruisin' for a Bruisin'" "Panique à bord"	Jack Bernhardt	Jean Cayrol & Olivier Pouchleon	May 24, 2023	205
17	5	"Artistic Differences" "Différences artistiques"	James Huntrods	Guillaume Bracciali	May 24, 2023	205
When the tree begins to leak sap, Chip decides to move out, but Dale doesn't want to leave, and joins forces with the living sap to persuade Chip otherwise. However, when the sap goes out of control and attempts to forcibly hypnotize Chip into staying, Dale is forced to save him. The animal retirement home is converted into a cruise ship after it falls into the water, where Chip and Dale argue over their forced positions, despite that their shifts are timed, and each discover that each experience is more than they bargained for. When Chip and Dale disagree on their artistic differences, Dale extracts revenge for breaking his ugly statue by converting it into a remote controlled robot to haunt him.
18	6	"Gift Attack" "Attaque en cadeau"	Jack Bernhardt	Guillaume Bracciali	May 24, 2023	206
18	6	"Beetlemania" "Passion scarabée"	James Huntrods	Julien Thompson	May 24, 2023	206
18	6	"Nut My Parcel" "Pas de noix"	Elijah Harris	Guillaume Bracciali	May 24, 2023	206
Chip and Dale engage each other in a gift warfare, causing each other to get annoyed by the cycle, but their gifts suddenly come in handy when two cats try to eat them. Chip and Dale adopt a baby beetle for a pet, but it turns out to be more trouble than it's worth when they discover it's an ugly adult dung beetle that carries a mysterious scent that makes it look like a baby beetle to them. Chip finds a spider egg on their doorstep and tries to find out whom it belongs to while going to a concert with Dale, who desperately doesn't want to be late.
19	7	"The Big Nut Hunt" "La chasse aux noix"	Nicole Paglia	Fabrice Guevel	August 30, 2023	207
19	7	"Beauty and the Butch" "La Belle et le Butch"	Jack Bernhardt	Léa Cousty	August 30, 2023	207
19	7	"Are We Nut Enough?" "La séparation"	Jack Bernhardt	Anh Tu Cao	August 30, 2023	207
Chip, Dale, and Clarice go on a treasure hunt, but when a hawk snatches them and brings them all the way back to the beginning, they go to the mob boss to use their pig to go back to the treasure. But the mob boss wants all the treasure for himself. Pluto and Butch are turned away from an exclusive dog park, but when trying to escape from Butch, Chip's running styles his hair, and he is granted access because of his good looks. Dale becomes bored with the daily routine.
20	8	"No Pain, No Nuts" "Qui ne tente rien noix rien"	Jack Bernhardt	Julien Thompson	August 30, 2023	208
20	8	"Farm Life" "À la campagne"	Ayoola Solarin	Amaury Allaire	August 30, 2023	208
20	8	"The Apprentices" "Les apprentis"	Nicole Paglia	Sandrine Normand	August 30, 2023	208
Donald shares some humiliating videos of Chip 'n' Dale with Daisy, bribing the chipmunks with nuts. Growing weary of the garbage they always eat from the park trash can, Chip suggests to Dale they get some food from what they think at first is a nearby farm, but is actually a city supermarket. Clarice reluctantly teaches Chip and Dale how to fix things so they can earn acorns for their work. Dale is only skillful whenever Chip yells at him.
21	9	"Eye Spy" "Œil espion"	Nicole Paglia	Sandrine Normand	August 30, 2023	209
21	9	"Duck Pluck" "Canard plumé"	James Huntrods	Guillaume Bracciali	August 30, 2023	209
21	9	"Nuts and Dragons" "Noix et dragons"	Elijah Harris	Amaury Allaire	August 30, 2023	209
Chip and Dale get on the wrong side of their new upstairs neighbor, Poe de Spell, who gives them a third eye with future-seeing abilities. Chip and Dale steal some of groundskeeper Donald's feathers to maximize their comfort. Chip, Dale, Clarice and their friends go on a quest to slay what they believe is a dragon that has taken their stuff, which is actually a kite shaped like a dragon.
22	10	"The Summit" "Le sommet"	James Huntrods	Sandrine Normand	August 30, 2023	210
22	10	"The Housesitter" "Le gardien"	Jillian Goldfluss	Christophe Pinto	August 30, 2023	210
22	10	"Keep Smiling" "On sourit"	Jack Bernhardt	Amaury Allaire	August 30, 2023	210
Chip and Dale attempt to survive a blizzard in the park caused by Donald, who has turned the park into a ski resort. Chip and Dale housesit for Clarice while she is away, but after she blames Chip for Dale messing up, she bans Chip from the house. Chip doesn't like sadness, so he essentially forces people to smile.
23	11	"Prickly Pear" "La figue"	Nicole Paglia	Amaury Allaire	August 30, 2023	211
23	11	"Dale and Daler" "Tac et Tac"	Nicole Paglia	Guillaume Bracciali	August 30, 2023	211
23	11	"Time Traveller: Part 1" "Voyage dans le temps : 1er partie"	Nicole Paglia	Hugues Opter	August 30, 2023	211
Chip keeps insisting Dale to try cactus fruit. After getting a sunburn on his nose, Chip gets mistaken for Dale. Dale fears that Chip is getting too old and attempts to treat him as such. The two chipmunks then mess up the space-time continuum with Gyro's time machine.
24	12	"The Hole Truth" "Un os troubles"	Nicole Paglia	Guillaume Bracciali	August 30, 2023	212
24	12	"The Gift" "Le cadeau"	Ayoola Solarin	Mathilde Prevost	August 30, 2023	212
24	12	"Pest Friends" "Les pires amis"	James Huntrods	Guillaume Bracciali	August 30, 2023	212
Chip and Dale think they have murdered Donald after throwing him into a hole when he was bothering them with his jackhammering. Dale gives Chip a pearl from the bottom of the ocean for his birthday, but it soon causes trouble. Exterminator Donald traps Chip and Dale in his shack with the other vermin he collected in the park. But after he sets them free, they invade it.
25	13	"The Big Sock" "La grande chaussette"	Nicole Paglia	Johanna Huck	December 20, 2023	213
25	13	"Hark! The Squirrel Sings" "Écoutez! L'écureuil chante"	Nicole Paglia	Johanna Huck	December 20, 2023	213
25	13	"The Christmas Roast" "Le rôti de Noël"	Nicole Paglia	Johanna Huck	December 20, 2023	213
Dale believes in a miracle. Dale questions Chip's Christmas spirit. A grudge threatens a feast.
26	14	"In the Sewers" "Dans les égouts"	Nicole Paglia	Boris Brenot	May 22, 2024	214
26	14	"The Grand Crow Prix" "Le Grand Prix du corbeau"	Jack Bernhardt	Alice Bissonnet	May 22, 2024	214
26	14	"The Candlemaker" "Le cirier"	James Huntrods	Boris Brenot	May 22, 2024	214
Chip & Dale face their dark sides. Chip races for a grand prize. Dale's a terrible candlemaker.
27	15	"Goodbye, Park Life" "Adieu, la vie au parc"	Jillian Goldfluss	Johanna Huck	May 22, 2024	215
27	15	"Cat Flap Burglars" "Les cambrioleurs de chatière"	James Huntrods	Alice Bissonnet	May 22, 2024	215
27	15	"The Breakdown" "La panne"	Jack Bernhardt	Hugo Voisin	May 22, 2024	215
Chip worries the park is doomed. Chip & Dale plan a grand heist. A bad motel tests Chip's patience.
28	16	"Time Traveller: Part 2" "Voyage dans le temps : 2e partie"	Nicole Paglia	Nicolas Livet	May 22, 2024	216
28	16	"Dale-icious" "Un goût fan-Tac-stique"	Jack Bernhardt	Alice Bissonnet	May 22, 2024	216
28	16	"A Little Chipmunk Told Me" "Un petit tamia me l'a dit"	Jason Forbes	Boris Brenot	May 22, 2024	216
Chip is stranded in the past. Chip wants to eat Dale. Chip & Dale discover a secret oasis.
29	17	"Hamster Paradise" "Un paradis pour hamster"	Jillian Goldfluss	Johanna Huck	May 22, 2024	217
29	17	"Puppy Papas" "Les papas des chiots"	Elijah Harris	Nicolas Livet	May 22, 2024	217
29	17	"The Adorables" "Les adorables"	Ayoola Solarin	Mathilde Prevost	May 22, 2024	217
Chip & Dale toughen up hamsters. Chip & Dale agree to puppysit. Chip & Dale go to a petting zoo.
30	18	"Sleepless Symphony" "La symphonie de la nuit"	Jillian Goldfluss	Anh Tu Cao & Khalil Ben Naamane	May 22, 2024	218
30	18	"The Bell" "La cloche"	Nicole Paglia	Boris Brenot	May 22, 2024	218
30	18	"The Suitcase" "La valise"	James Huntrods	Nicolas Livet	May 22, 2024	218
A musical without sleep. Chip's fearlessness alarms Dale. Chip & Dale pick up the wrong luggage.
