= Christophe Lemoine =

French actor (born 1978)

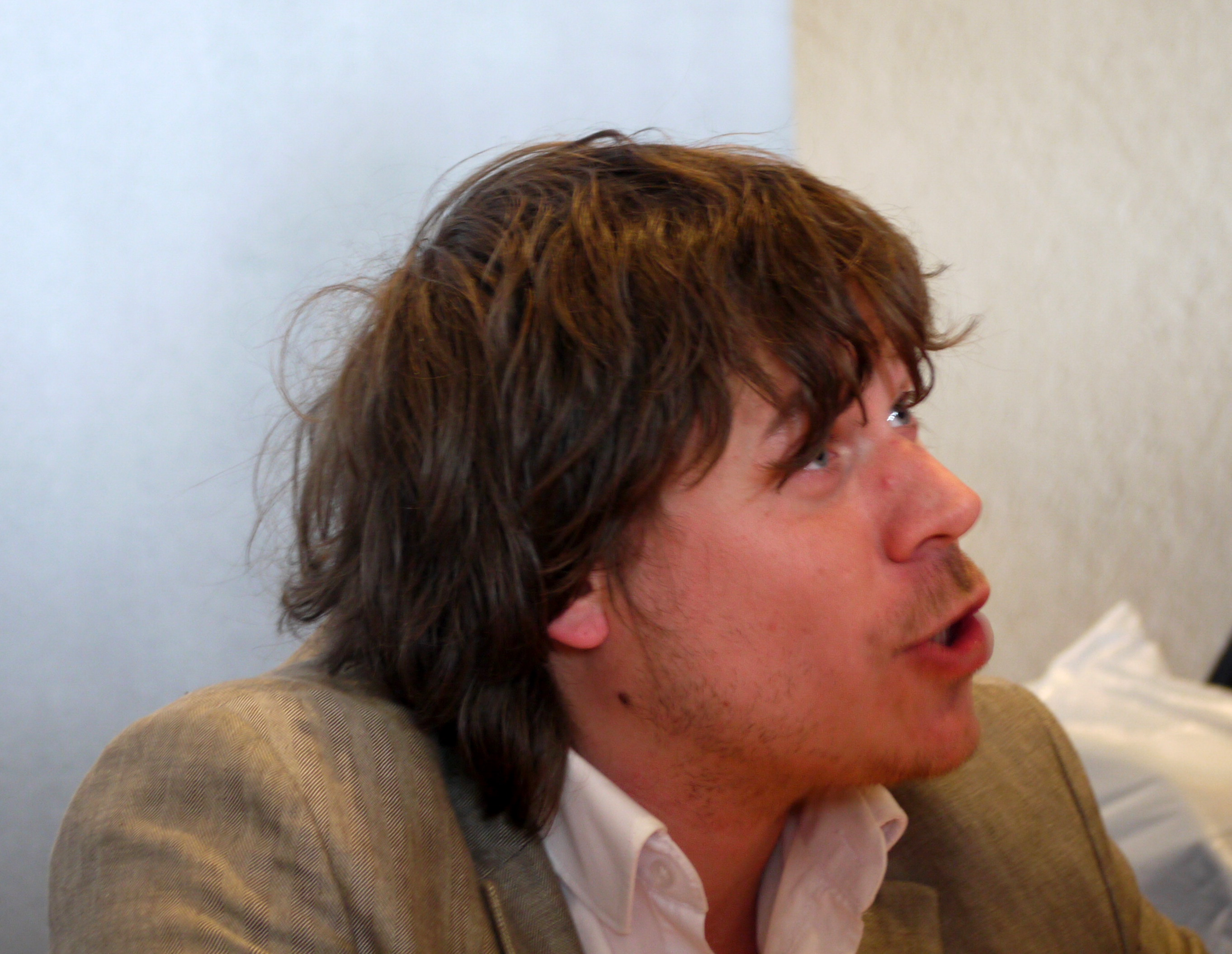
- Christophe Lemoine at Mang'Azur 2009 in Toulon, France.
- Born: 11 December 1978 (age 47); France
- Occupation: Actor

Christophe Lemoine (French: [kʁistɔf ləmwan]; born 11 December 1978) is a French actor who specializes in dubbing. He is mainly known as the voice of Samwise Gamgee in The Lord of the Rings film trilogy, Eric Cartman in South Park, Tucker Foley and Vlad Plasmius in Danny Phantom, and Arnold Perlstein in The Magic School Bus.

== Roles ==
=== Television animation ===
- Angry Kid (Angry Kid)
- Back to the Future: The Animated Series (Jules Brown, Biff Junior)
- The Batman (Firefly, Rag Doll, The Flash)
- Batman: The Brave and the Bold (Blue Beetle, Jay Garrick)
- Danny Phantom (Tucker Foley, Vlad Masters)
- Doug (Douglas "Doug" Funnie)
- Drawn Together (Spanky Ham, Ling-Ling)
- El Tigre: The Adventures of Manny Rivera (Dr. Chiplote Jr.)
- Family Guy (Chris Griffin)
- Goof Troop (Max Goof)
- Helluva Boss (Mammon)
- Hey Arnold! (Wolfgang)
- The Magic School Bus (Arnold Perlstein)
- South Park (Eric Cartman, Butters Stotch, Phillip)
- Superman: The Animated Series (Jimmy Olsen)
- Teen Titans (Control Freak)

=== OVA ===
- An Extremely Goofy Movie (Max Goof)

=== Theatrical animation ===
- The Black Cauldron (second dub) (Taran)
- A Goofy Movie (Max Goof)
- Kiki's Delivery Service (Jiji)
- Team America: World Police (Kim Jong-il)
- Toy Story (Sid Phillips)
- Toy Story 2 (Aliens)
- Doug's 1st Movie (Douglas "Doug" Funnie)
- Pattie and the Wrath of Poseidon (Sam)

=== Video games ===
- Army of Two (Elliot Salem)
- Crash: Mind over Mutant (Doctor N. Gin)
- Crash of the Titans (Doctor N. Gin)
- Crash Tag Team Racing (Doctor N. Gin)
- Brütal Legend (Eddie Riggs)
- Borderlands 2 (Handsome Jack)
- Borderlands: The Pre-Sequel (Handsome Jack)

=== Live action ===
- 24 (Milo Pressman, Lynn McGill)
- Accepted (Bartleby Gaines)
- Anchorman: The Legend of Ron Burgundy (Biker)
- Battle Royale (Yoshitoki "Nobu" Kuninobu)
- Be Kind Rewind (Jerry)
- Belle maman (French Narrator)
- The Big Boss (Hsiao Chiun)
- The Butterfly Effect (Lenny Kagan)
- Click (Bill Harley)
- Dark Blue (Darryl Orchard)
- Final Destination (Tod Waggner)
- The Girl Next Door (Matthew Kidman)
- Herbie: Fully Loaded (Kevin)
- House (Lucas Douglas)
- Human Traffic (Moff)
- Jackass Number Two (Chris Pontius)
- Jump In! (Rodney Tyler)
- Jumper (Mark)
- Kermit's Swamp Years (Croaker)
- King Kong (Carl Denham)
- The Lord of the Rings film trilogy (Samwise Gamgee)
- The Man (Booty)
- The Matrix (Mouse)
- Miami 7 (Bradley McIntosh)
- The Nanny (Brighton Sheffield)
- NCIS (Jimmy Palmer)
- One Tree Hill (Chris Keller)
- The Score (Steven)
- Scrubs (Kevin)
- The Secret World of Alex Mack (Louis Driscoll)
- Shallow Hal (Hal Larson)
- Shaolin Soccer (Weight Vest)
- Six Feet Under (Jake)
- Skins ("Posh" Kenneth)
- Slackers (Dave)
- Tenacious D in The Pick of Destiny (JB)
- The Young and the Restless (Nicholas Newman)
