= Emmanuel Curtil =

French actor (born 1971)

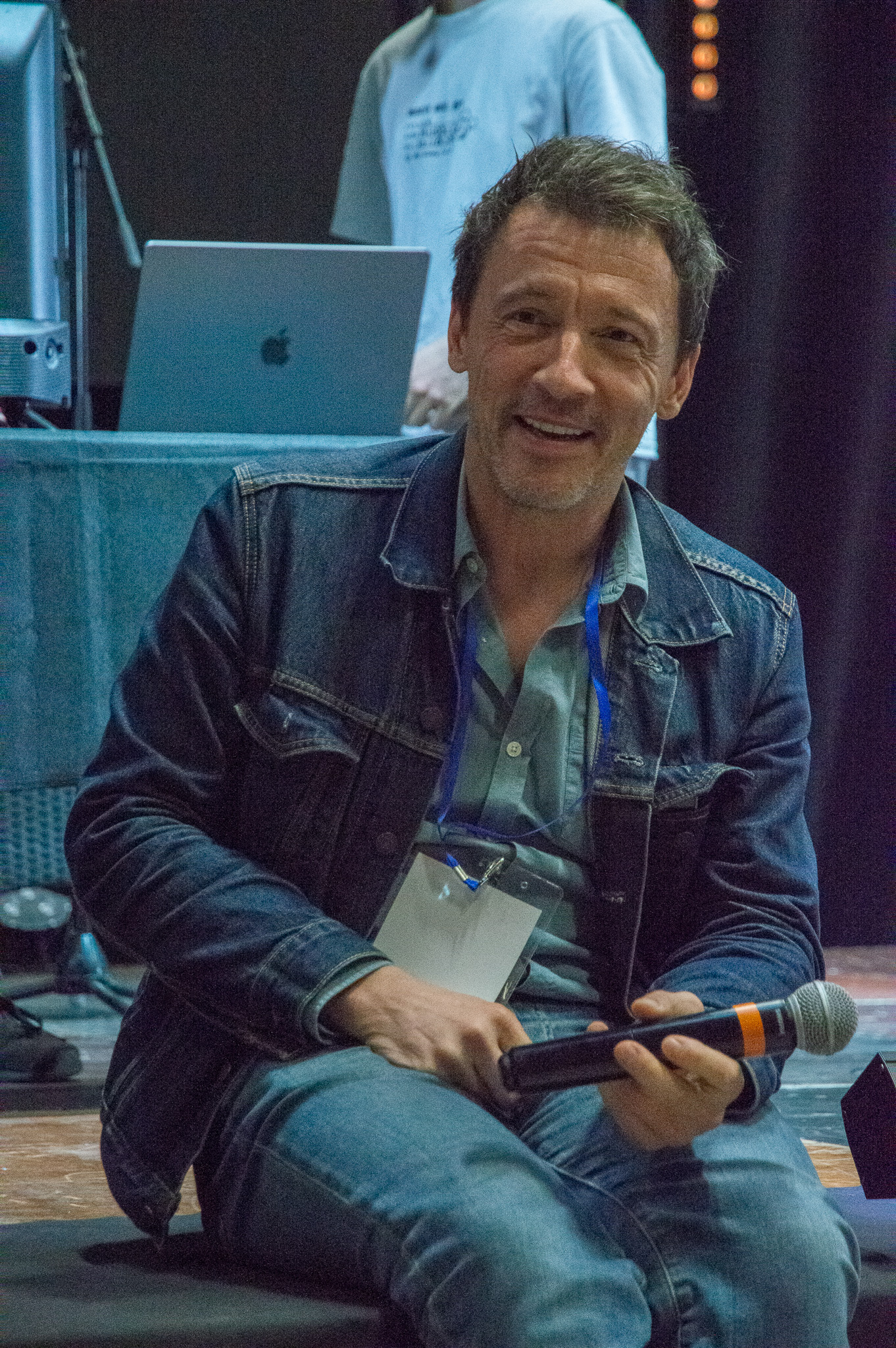
- Curtil in 2023.
- Born: 7 February 1971 (age 55); Charenton-le-Pont, France
- Occupation: Actor

Emmanuel Curtil (born 7 February 1971) is a French actor known primarily for his voice work, having dubbed the voice of Matthew Perry (Chandler) for the first eight seasons of the American sitcom Friends. Curtil is also the official dub actor for Jim Carrey. He is also the current voice of Goofy, assuming that duty from Gérard Rinaldi, who died in 2012.

== Biography ==
At the age of nine, Curtil's mother (an artistic agent) encouraged him to enter Cours Simon, a theatrical training program in Paris for children. At that time, he wanted to be a singer, then an impressionist, but his mother, knowing that show business was a difficult field but also certain of her son's potential, steered him toward acting. Thus at 10 years old he made his début in L'Oiseau bleu, a made-for-TV movie directed by Gabriel Axel. This caught the attention of director Robert Hossein, who cast Curtil as Gavroche in an adaptation of Les Misérables, which aired as a miniseries on French TV in 1982.

Next he played Paul in the musical comedy Paul et Virginie directed by Jean-Jacques Debout. In 1983, Curtil landed the role of Stéphane in the film Vive les femmes! directed by Claude Confortès. He also counts in his record of professional achievements numerous roles in television series like Pause-café and Tribunal, a daily episodic program. However, that type of production is very tricky because economic constraints require shooting two episodes a day, and do not allow rehearsals; the actors must therefore spit out lines learned by heart the night before. His artistic development stagnating, Curtil henceforth avoided that type of series. While he had taken singing lessons at the start of his career, they did not serve him well because his teacher had given him lyrics poorly adapted to his baritone voice and to his profession.

But Curtil's entry into the field of dubbing did not occur until Barbara Tissier (whose dubbing credits include the voice of Soleil Moon Frye on Punky Brewster and Christina Applegate on Married... with Children) advised him to audition at SOFI, a dubbing agency that was looking for "young" voices. Curtil was chosen immediately. At that time the field was booming, with the upsurge of private networks that broadcast primarily foreign series dubbed into French. Thus began Curtil's grand career in dubbing (although he had occasionally had to redub his own lines in the past because of technical issues).

Curtil dubbed Mark-Paul Gosselaar in Saved by the Bell, then Dean Cain in Lois and Clark, Kyle Chandler in Early Edition, Doug Savant in Melrose Place, and above all Matthew Perry in Friends. At present, Curtil voices Doug Savant playing Tom Scavo in Desperate Housewives.

Curtil first dubbed Jim Carrey in The Mask. An important casting call was organized, and the distributor chose Curtil, who has been the "official voice" of Carrey in France ever since.

In animated features film, he voiced Simba in Disney's Le Roi Lion and Moses in the 1998 DreamWorks film Le Prince d'Égypte.

He dubbed the characters' singing voice as well as their speaking voice, for example in Anastasia and The Lion King, as well as in a musical episode of Buffy contre les vampires where he interpreted the singing voice of Giles.

In 1998, Curtil started to take piano lessons, focusing his studies on a classical repertoire. When time permits, he devotes himself to reading and listens to a lot of music. He has a wife and one son.

== Stage ==
- Paul et Virginie (1992) directed by Jean-Jacques Debout at Théâtre de Paris
- Jack and the Beanstalk (2005) directed by Oscar Sisto at Théâtre du Temple
- Rutabaga Swing (2006) directed by Philippe Ogouz at Théâtre des Champs-Élysées

== Selected voice acting on television ==
- Voice of Chandler Bing (actor Matthew Perry) in Friends (seasons 1–8)
- Voice of Clark Kent/Superman (actor Dean Cain) in Lois et Clark
- Voice of Barry Dylan in the sitcom Archer
- Voice of Gary Hobson (actor Kyle Chandler) in Demain à la une
- Voice of Benton Fraser (actor Paul Gross) in Un tandem de choc
- Voice of Zack Morris (actor Mark-Paul Gosselaar) in Sauvés par le gong
- Voice of Dennis Sweeny (actor Mark-Paul Gosselaar) in Hyperion Bay
- Voice of Kevin Wyat (actor Antonio Sabato, Jr.) in Ally McBeal
- Voice of Bane (actor Antonio Sabato, Jr.) in Charmed
- Voice of Chance Harper (actor D. B. Sweeney) in Drôle de chance
- Voice of Matt Fielding (actor Doug Savant) in Melrose Place
- Voice of Craig Phillips (actor Doug Savant) in 24 heures chrono
- Voice of Tom Scavo (actor Doug Savant) in Desperate Housewives
- Voice of Josh Walter (actor Doug Savant) in La croisière s'amuse, nouvelle vague
- Voice of Leroy Johnson (actor Gene Anthony Ray) in Fame
- Voice of Tommy (actor Michael Worth) in Agence Acapulco
- Voice of David Fisher (actor Michael C. Hall) in Six Feet Under
- Voice of Daggett in The Angry Beavers
- Voice of Frank Murphy in F Is for Family (seasons 3–5)
- Voice of Thomas Lancaster Dubois in The Boondocks
- Voice of Tobias Curtis (actor Eddy Kaye Thomas) in Scorpion
- Voice of Ed Mercer (actor Seth MacFarlane) in The Orville
- Voice of Jeff Pickles (actor Jim Carrey) in Kidding
- Voice of Stanley Ipkiss/The Mask in The Mask: Animated Series
- Voice of Goofy in Chip 'n' Dale: Park Life
- Voice of Zorka in Get Blake!
- Voice of Dick Kowalski in Funky Cops

== Selected voice acting in film ==
- Adult Simba (originally voiced by Matthew Broderick) in Le Roi lion
- Jim Carrey in almost all of his films, except Batman Forever, and The Number 23
- Ghostface (originally voiced by Roger L. Jackson) in Scream
- Moses (originally voiced by Val Kilmer) in Le Prince d'Égypte
- Raoul Duke/Hunter S. Thompson (actor Johnny Depp) in Las Vegas Parano
- Dimitri (originally voiced by John Cusack) in Anastasia
- Garret in Quest for Camelot
- Buck in Ice Age: Dawn of the Dinosaurs and Ice Age: Collision Course
- Zucchini in Mune: Guardian of the Moon (2014)
- Kronk in The Emperor's New Groove and Kronk's New Groove
- Surly in The Nut Job
- Mike Myers in The Cat in the Hat
- The Toucan in Encanto
- Chickos in Epic Tails
