= Montpellier Film Festival =

Festival Cinema Mediterranéen Montpellier
- Location: Montpellier
- Established: 1979
- Awards: Antigone d'Or
- Directors: Leoluca Orlando (incumbent president)
- Artistic director: Christophe Leparc (incumbent)
- Website: https://www.cinemed.tm.fr/

Montpellier International Mediterranean Film Festival (Cinemed) is the second most important cinema festival in the Mediterranean after the Cannes Film Festival. Cinemed aims to promote the cinema from the Mediterranean basin, the Black Sea, Portugal, and Armenia. It was inaugurated in 1979.

The festival's main prize is the Antigone d'Or.

== Profile ==
The festival under the original name Rencontres avec le cinéma méditerranéen was established in 1979 by the team of the Ciné-club Jean-Vigo. In 1989, the festival inaugurated a competitive section and was renamed Festival Cinema Mediterranéen Montpellier.

Henri Talvat, one of Cinemed's co-founders, was the festival's president for many years one of the event co-founders, flanked by the director Jean-François Bourgeot. In October 2014 Philippe Saurel, the mayor of the Montpellier Métropole, announced forthcoming changes in the Cinemed's management. Jean-François Bourgeot resigned in 2015. In 2016, Christophe Leparc became the director of Cinemed (he is also the general secretary of the Directors' Fortnight of the Cannes Film Festival), while Aurélie Filippetti was appointed its president. In 2019, Filippetti was replaced by Leoluca Orlando, the mayor of Palermo.

=== Location and programme ===
Cinemed's line-up features around 200 films annually. The festival puts emphasis on its spirit of tolerance, its programme reflects the drama of the region, caught up in the conflicts. The screenings take place in various locations across the city, including Opéra Berlioz, Centre Rabelais, Maison pour tous Louis-Feuillade, etc.

=== Awards and sections ===
In feature film competition, the Antigone d'Or for the Best Film goes with a €15,000 prize where €9,000 go to the French distributor company. Other awards are the Filmgoers', the Critics', JAM award for best music, Social Energy Activities award, and CMCAS Young People award. In short films competition the distributed prizes are: the Grand Prix for Short Films, the Filmgoers' Award, the Young People's award, Canal+ award. In the Documentaries Competition, the Ulysses Prize is given for the best French international documentary film.

Non-competitive sections include retrospectives and special screenings. Along with the abovementioned, Cinemed hosts Young audience festival, middle schools screenings; Flying fish short film workshop for under 15 directors; Fais ton reportage workshop where emerging journalists from 12 to 18 years old create reports on the festival.

=== Industry section ===
Cinemed Meetings, an industry section, is a three days long professional event, dedicated to emerging filmmakers and their projects. Along with multiple professional and educational events, the section hosts pitching sessions where winners are offered development grants. Established in 2022, Cinemed & Aflamuna programme chooses 10 projects from the Arab world.

The industry section is supported by France's National Film Board CNC.
