= The Jungle Bunch (film) =

- French theatrical release poster
- Directed by: David Alaux
- Written by: David Alaux; Éric Tosti; Jean-François Tosti
- Produced by: Jean-François Tosti; Bernard Birebent; François Cadene
- Starring: Philippe Bozo; Laurent Morteau; Pascal Casanova; Céline Monsarrat
- Edited by: Jean-Christian Tassy
- Music by: Olivier Cussac
- Production companies: TAT Productions; Master Films; France 3 Cinéma
- Distributed by: SND Films
- Release dates: 13 June 2017 (Annecy International Animation Film Festival); 26 July 2017 (France)
- Running time: 97 minutes
- Country: France
- Languages: French; English
- Budget: $45 million

The Jungle Bunch is a 2017 French animated adventure comedy film directed by David Alaux. Based on the animated series The Jungle Bunch, the film was released in France on 26 July 2017 and was poorly received by critics but was a box office success overall, with over a million admissions.

== Plot ==
An iceberg with an egg appears on the banks of an African jungle. Meanwhile, The Champs, consisting of big Bengal tigress Natacha, hippie three-toed sloth Tony, neurotic Javan rhinoceros Goliath and crested porcupine Ricky, are engaged in saving all the inhabitants of the Jungle, mainly due to the evil deeds of a koala named Igor. During the next chase, Igor almost manages to escape from the island in a small boat, but he is hit by the iceberg, preventing the koala from leaving the shore. Igor tries to break the egg (delivered by the iceberg), but is defeated by The Champs, while the egg ends up on a tree.

As Natacha sends Igor to the Island of the Lost, a small desert island where evil animals are exiled, he tells her that he left in the Jungle timed exploding mushrooms, which are already starting to explode at that moment. Natacha immediately hurries back to shore to save the rest of the inhabitants. During the ensuing fire in the Jungle, Ricky, for the sake of saving the rest, sacrifices himself, while throwing the egg to safety. Natacha believes that the activities of The Champs led to the death of Ricky, and together with Goliath and Tony abolishes the team. A baby emperor penguin then hatches from the egg Ricky threw, whom Natacha calls Maurice and raises as her son. Goliath, who considered himself unnecessary after the collapse of the team, leaves, while Natacha and Tony stay together to raise Maurice. When Maurice grows up, he feels the desire to follow in the footsteps of his mother, against her will, and save all inhabitants of those who are in danger from other evil animals. Maurice says goodbye to his mother, and sets out on his journey. Meanwhile, Igor has the seed of a palm tree with him, and nurtures its growth, and at the same time acquiring a lieutenant – Surimi the coconut crab.

Years later, the Jungle Bunch, consisting of Maurice, his adopted tiger barb son Junior, dimwitted mountain gorilla Miguel, neurotic tarsier Gilbert, fruit bat Batrica, glass frog Al, and cane toad Bob, are busy rescuing elephants who were forced to serve a group of olive baboons under their threat to destroy their sacred totem. Igor finally waits for the tree to grow, and he, along with Surimi, leave the Island of the Lost. Soon, the Jungle Bunch notice a burning tree and they arrive there, where they meet Igor, who lures them into a trap and learns from them that Maurice is Natacha's son. Igor talks about his plans to destroy them, and then The Champs, and then he leaves, leaving the Jungle Bunch to wait for them to die from the explosion of his mushrooms. The team manage to escape from the explosion due to Miguel's powerful allergy to ficus flowers, after which they head to Natacha. Igor takes the baboons under his army, who because of the Jungle Bunch can not engage in banditry. Igor develops the idea of undermining the cave, so that the Jungle will collapse and be flooded. When the Jungle Bunch arrive at Natacha's home, she is pleased to meet Maurice and Junior, but soon learns from Maurice about the return of Igor and tells his son the story about the koala; Igor had wanted to join The Champs as their leader, but the others thought that he was not. Natacha decides to find Goliath with Tony and revive The Champs, while not wanting to involve Maurice and his Jungle Bunch in their affairs.

The next day, The Champs decide to interfere with Igor's plans, while cutting off the road to the Jungle Bunch, destroying the bridge. When The Champs find Igor, he, in turn, leads them into his trap, but the team almost manages to defeat Igor. Maurice decides to help The Champs by catapulting himself and his son, but his intervention leads to Igor escaping, and he takes Junior with him as a hostage. Natacha shows Maurice that, through his fault, Igor escaped and kidnapped Junior, and asks the "Jungle Bunch" not to intervene. Maurice himself gets disappointed and removes himself from his own team. As a storm began to rage, Maurice's stripes are washed off. The Champs reach Igor's lair, but are ambushed and captured by Igor. Maurice soon finds himself near the pond and sees the memories where he left his home and found an egg, from which a young Junior hatched and he sheltered him, making him his son. At that time, Junior escapes from captivity and arrives at the pond where Maurice is still. Maurice is glad of the return of his son and finds out that The Champs are in captivity and many animals are enslaved, forced to grow mushroom bombs for Igor. Maurice restores yellow stripes on his body and makes Junior a new fishbowl.

Maurice and Junior return to the Jungle Bunch, who wanted to save The Champs without Maurice's help, and with them, they penetrate inside the lair of Igor under the disguise of two baboons. The heroes release The Champs and together they fight the baboons. During then, Batrica finally confesses her love for Gilbert, to whom the latter accepts and decides to keep it between them, unaware they've confessed it to everyone, after Batrica pulled Igor's microphone flap to save Gilbert. Shortly after the defeat of the baboons, Igor activates the bombs and disappears. Maurice instructs The Champs to evacuate the inhabitants of the jungle, and he and the Jungle Bunch go to prevent the mushrooms from exploding. After riding a minecart down to the main mushroom bomb, Gilbert suggests that they should knock down some bombs, in order to stop the giant mushroom bomb. Maurice succeeds, but he nearly relights the bombs when his belt lights on fire. Fortunately, Junior hops out of his aquarium and extinguishes the fire. Having managed to save the jungle, The Champs and the Jungle Bunch again face Igor, who declares that he will never stop, but Maurice catapults Junior, who in turn drives away Surimi from the jetpack, who takes off in a parachute, then overloads the ammunition, causing Igor's jetpack to malfunction. Soon, The Champs decide to retire, while the Jungle Bunch continue their heroism.

In the post-credits scenes, Igor is still alive as he and Surimi are back on the Island Of The Lost. After the final credits, Igor finds another seed on the island, but this time a seagull seizes it.

== Characters ==
- Maurice, a brave emperor penguin who thinks that he is a tiger
- Junior, a Tiger barb who is Maurice's adopted son
- Miguel, a dimwitted blue gorilla
- Gilbert, a neurotic brown tarsier
- Batricia, a female fruit bat
- Al, a thin Red Strawberry poison dart frog
- Bob, an overweight green African bullfrog

== Cast ==
=== Original French dubbing voices ===
- Philippe Bozo as Maurice
- Laurent Morteau as Gilbert
- Pascal Casanova as Miguel
- Céline Monsarrat as Batricia
- Emmanuel Curtil as Al
- Paul Borne as Bob
- Maïk Darah as Natacha
- Frantz Confiac as Tony
- Alain Dorval as Goliath
- Richard Darbois as Igor

=== English dubbing voices ===
- Kirk Thornton as Maurice
- Kaiji Tang as Junior, Tony
- Cam Stance as Miguel
- André Gordon as Gilbert, Al
- Christopher Corey Smith as Bob
- Erin Fitzgerald as Batricia
- Dorothy Fahn as Natacha
- Richard Epcar as Goliath
- Keith Silverstein as Igor

== Release ==
The film was released in France on 26 July 2017. In the UK and US, it was released on 15 September 2017. It was released in Australia on 25 January 2018.

== Sequel ==
A sequel to The Jungle Bunch, Les As de la jungle 2: Opération tour du monde, was released on August 16, 2023, with Benoît Somville to direct and David Alaux, Éric Tosti and Jean-François Tosti returning to write the film.

== Reception ==
The film was a failure among critics. On Rotten Tomatoes the film a rating of 35%, based on 20 reviews with an average rating of 4.8/10. The site's critical consensus reads, "At once restless and plodding, The Jungle Bunch is a woefully indistinct piece of animated kiddie fare." On Metacritic, the film received an score of 38 out of 100 based on 4 reviews. Cath Clarke from The Guardian rated the film 2 out of 5 stars, calling it "loud and zappy" and it "trots out predictable be-kind-be-brave platitudes, but lacks anything distinctive of its own."
