= The Jungle Bunch =

2013 French television series

- Also known as: The Jungle Bunch: To the Rescue!
- Genre: Comedy; Adventure; Animation
- Created by: Jean-François Tosti; David Alaux; Éric Tosti; Julien Fournet
- Developed by: David Alaux; Eric Tosti
- Written by: David Alaux; Éric Tosti; Jean-François Tosti
- Theme music composer: Olivier Cussac
- Opening theme: The Jungle Bunch Theme
- Ending theme: The Jungle Bunch Theme
- Composer: Olivier Cussac
- Country of origin: France
- Original languages: French; English
- No. of seasons: 3
- No. of episodes: 158

Production
- Production companies: TAT Productions; Master Films

Original release
- Network: France 3
- Release: December 29, 2013 – 2021

The Jungle Bunch: To the Rescue! (also known as Les As de la Jungle: à la Rescousse ! in French) is a French animated television series. It was created by Jean-François Tosti, David Alaux, Éric Tosti and produced by Toulouse-based TAT Productions, Seaworld Kids, and Master Films.

The series is about Maurice, a penguin who thinks he is a tiger, and his misfit friends. Together, they are the defenders of the jungle. The first season premiered on December 29, 2013 in France, the second season aired in 2016, and the third season aired in 2020. The Jungle Bunch: To the Rescue! won an International Emmy Award in the category Kids: Animation in 2014 and is aired in more than 180 territories. In the UK, it previously aired on Boomerang. In the US, it aired on Universal Kids.

== Synopsis ==
The show focuses on a bunch of animals embodying justice and hope, who are always ready for adventure and funny situations.

== Characters and members of The Jungle Bunch ==
- Maurice, a brave emperor penguin who thinks that he is a tiger
- Junior, a Tiger barb who is Maurice's adopted son
- Miguel, a dimwitted blue gorilla
- Gilbert, a neurotic brown tarsier
- Batricia, a female Fruit Bat
- Al and Bob, a thin Red Strawberry poison dart frog and an overweight green African bullfrog
- Fred, a singing warthog

== Episodes ==
Series	Episodes	Originally released	
Series	Episodes	First released	Last released
1	53	29 December 2013	2014
2	53	2016	2017
3	52	2020	2021

== Film ==
The series has been adapted from a 52-minute animated film titled The Jungle Bunch: The Movie (originally Les As de la Jungle: Opération Banquise; The Jungle Bunch: Back to the Ice Floe). The film aired on France 3, on December 31, 2011, and was released theatrically on April 10, 2013. This film was included as premium at the Kidscreen Awards.

In 2017, a feature film simply titled The Jungle Bunch was released. A sequel, The Jungle Bunch: Operation Meltdown was released in 2023.

== Awards and nominations ==
- San Diego International Kids Film Festival 2015: Grand Jury Prize - Best Short for the TV special The Great Treasure Quest
- New York Festivals 2015: Final Certificate
- International Emmy Awards 2014
- Cartoons on the Bay 2014: Pucinella Award for Best Children TV series
- Kidscreen Awards 2013: TV Movie Award for The Jungle Bunch: Back to the Ice Floe
