= Les As de la jungle 2: Opération tour du monde =

- Theatrical release poster
- Directed by: Laurent Bru; Yannick Moulin; Benoît Somville
- Written by: David Alaux; Eric Tosti; Jean-François Tosti
- Produced by: David Alaux; Jean-François Tosti
- Edited by: Magali Batut; Hélène Blanchard; Jean-Christian Tassy
- Production companies: Tat Productions; France 3 Cinéma; Master Films; SND Groupe M6
- Distributed by: SND Films
- Release dates: 16 August 2023 (France); 2 February 2024 (United States)
- Running time: 88 minutes
- Country: France
- Language: French
- Box office: $11.6 million

Les As de la jungle 2: Opération tour du monde (English: The Jungle Bunch 2: World Tour, released as The Jungle Bunch: Operation Meltdown in the United States) is a 2023 French animated adventure comedy film. Based on the animated series The Jungle Bunch, the film is a sequel to the 2017 film The Jungle Bunch.

== Voice cast ==
=== French ===
- Gauthier Battou as Sergueï
- Paul Borne as Bob
- Philippe Bozo as Maurice
- Pascal Casanova as Miguel
- Frédéric Cerdal as Albert
- Jérémie Covillault as Henry
- Emmanuel Curtil as Al
- Xavier Fagnon as Youri and Roger
- David Vincent as Junior
- Céline Montsarrat as Batricia
- Laurent Morteau as Gilbert
- Léopoldine Serre as Camélia
- Maïk Darah as Natasha
- Frantz Confiac as Tony
- Alain Dorval as Goliath
- Jérémy Prévost as Kiwi
- Guillaume Lebon

=== English ===
- Scott Humphrey as Maurice
- Wyatt Bowen as Gilbert
- Mark Camacho as Miguel and Henry
- Dawn Ford as Batricia
- Arthur Holden as Al
- Marcel Jeannin as Bob
- Holly Gauthier-Frankel as Camélia
- Richard Dumont as Albert
- Terrence Scammell as Youri and Sergueï
- David Vincent as Junior
- Additional Voices: Sonja Ball, Eleanor Noble and Brian Froud

== Production ==
Development

After the third season of the television series, TAT Productions announced the first animated film in the franchise, intended for theatrical release. A sequel was planned. The project involved Laurent Bru, Yannick Moulin, Benoît Somville, David Alaux (director and creator of the first film and the franchise), and Éric Tosti as screenwriter. The film was initially announced under the title "Les As De la jungle 2," but later changed its name to "Les As de la jungle 2: Opération tour du monde" (English: The Jungle Bunch 2: World Tour, released as The Jungle Bunch: Operation Meltdown in the United States).

Screenplay

The screenplay was written by David Alaux and Éric Tosti. The script summarized that Maurice, Junior, Miguel, Gilbert, Batricia, Al, and Bob will travel the world, much like Willy Fog from Jules Verne's "Around the World in 80 Days," with animals. The film made several references to "Around the World in 80 Days" and other world travel films, such as BRB Internacional "Around the World with Willy Fog". The film shows various homages to Jules Verne's "Around the World in 80 Days," such as characters and locations. In the film, Maurice is more similar to Willy Fog, Camelia the armadillo is more similar to Aouda, Gilbert, Junior, Batricia, Miguel, Al, and Bob are more similar to Jean Passepartout, and Henry the Beaver is more similar to Inspector Fix.

Animation

The film's animation was created by the same team as Pattie and the Wrath of Poseidon (French: Pattie et la Colère de Poséidon) (released in English as Epic Tails as well as Argonuts in some territories).

Score

The original score was composed by Olivier Cussac, who had already worked on the previous film and returned to compose the music for this film.

== Release ==
The film was theatrically released in France and Switzerland on 16 August 2023. It was released in Portugal as Os Super-Heróis da Selva 2 on 7 September of the same year. Viva Pictures released the movie in the United States on February 2, 2024, under the name The Jungle Bunch: Operation Meltdown.

== Reception ==
The film received a very mixed review in Telerama. Other reviews were more positive.
