= List of Goldie & Bear episodes =

Goldie & Bear is an American animated fantasy children's television series created by Jorge Aguirre for Disney Junior. It premiered on Disney Junior on September 12, 2015. In March 2016, Disney Junior renewed the series for a second season, which aired from September 18, 2017, to October 1, 2018.

In June 2018, Disney Junior cancelled the series. The series finale premiered on October 1, 2018. Reruns continued to air on the channel from October 2, 2018, to October 22, 2019.

== Series overview ==
Season	Segments	Episodes	Originally aired	
Season	Segments	Episodes	First aired	Last aired
1	43	22	September 12, 2015	August 15, 2016
2	45	23	September 18, 2017	October 1, 2018

== Episodes ==
All episodes in the series were directed by Chris Gilligan.

=== Season 1 (2015–16) ===
No. overall	No. in season	Title	Written by	Original release date	Viewers (millions)
1	1	"The Birthday Chair" "Big Bear"	Mike Rabb Jorge Aguirre & Rick Gitelson	September 12, 2015 (U.S) September 18, 2015 (Canada; order swapped)	N/A
The Birthday Chair: Goldie rebuilds Bear's old chair that she broke and gives it to him as a birthday present.: Song: "He's Gonna Love It"; Big Bear: When Bear gets tired of being small, Jack gives him a magic bean that will make him big.: Song: "I'm Just Right"; DVD releases: Goldie & Bear: Best Fairytale Friends
2	2	"Too Much Jack and Jill" "Tiny Tale"	Claudia Silver	November 11, 2015 (U.S) December 28, 2015 (Canada)	N/A
Too Much Jack and Jill: Goldie and Bear help Jack and Jill, who are running a lemonade stand, fetch a pail of water.: Song: "We Wanna Be Like You"; Tiny Tale: Goldie and Bear get accidentally shrunk by the Fairy Godmother who was helping Mama and Papa Bear move the sofa.: Song: "Big Wide World is New"
3	3	"Abraca Cabbage" "Furry Godmother"	Cydne Clark and Steve Granat Jorge Aguirre	November 12, 2015 (U.S) December 29, 2015 (Canada)	N/A
Abraca Cabbage: When Goldie performs her first magic show, she inadvertently tricks the audience into thinking she's turned into a cabbage. Furry Godmother: When Bear finds the Fairy Godmother's magic wand, he sprouts fairy wings and the ability to grant wishes.: Song: "Floating on Air"
4	4	"Fee Fi Fo Shoe" "Little Gold Riding Hood"	Peter Hunziker Jorge Aguirre	November 16, 2015 (U.S) December 5, 2015 (Canada)	N/A
Fee Fi Fo Shoe: During a buttercup ball game, the Giant's shoe falls in the middle of the game and a family starts living in the shoe. Little Gold Riding Hood: Red lends Goldie her hood to deliver some muffins to Grandma until The Big Bad Wolf tries to steal them.: Song: I Look Perfect; DVD releases: Goldie & Bear: Best Fairytale Friends
5	5	"Bear's Red Shoes" "Goose Sitters"	Claudia Silver Joe Ansolabehere	November 17, 2015 (U.S) December 30, 2015 (Canada)	N/A
Bear's Red Shoes: Bear gets some magic shoes that will help him dance so amazing until The Big Bad Wolf swaps the shoes with regular shoes.: Song: "Magic Dancing Feet"; Goose Sitters: Goldie and Bear become goose sitters for Jack's gold laying egg goose until she gets out of her cage.: Song: "We Won't Let You Down"; DVD releases: Goldie & Bear: Best Fairytale Friends
6	6	"Moon Jump" "The Big Good Wolf"	Bernie Ancheta Mike Rabb	November 18, 2015 (U.S) December 31, 2015 (Canada)	N/A
Moon Jump: When Goldie is chosen to ride the cow that jumps over the moon, Bear gets disappointed that he wasn't chosen.: Song: "Over the Moon"; The Big Good Wolf: The Big Bad Wolf's brother, Phil comes for a visit.: Song: Bein' Nice is Easy; DVD releases: Goldie & Bear: Best Fairytale Friends
7	7	"Pinocchio-itis" "The Clubhouse that Jack Built"	Andy Ochiltree Mike Rabb	November 20, 2015 (U.S) January 1, 2016 (Canada)	N/A
Pinocchio-itis: When Goldie starts lying, her nose starts growing. But things become even more complicated when Goldie keeps lying in order to surprise Bear. The Clubhouse that Jack Built: Bear joins a club that only lets in boys whose first name is "Jack".: Song: "If Your Name is Jack"; DVD releases: Goldie & Bear: Best Fairytale Friends
8	8	"The Egg" "Golden Kickball"	Madellaine Paxson Lorne Cameron	November 23, 2015 (U.S) January 2, 2016 (Canada)	N/A
The Egg: Goldie and Bear finds an egg and returns it to its nest.: Song: "My Dragon and Me"; Golden Kickball: Bear kicks his new golden kickball too hard, and it lands in the Witch's gingerbread house.: Song: "Gotta Get My Ball"; DVD releases: Goldie & Bear: Best Fairytale Friends
9	9	"Thumbelina's Wild Ride" "Big Bad House Guest"	Rachel Lipman Claudia Silver	December 4, 2015 (U.S) January 2, 2016 (Canada)	N/A
Thumbelina's Wild Ride: Thumbelina is Goldie and Bear's babysitter.: Song: "Big Fun Bein' Small"; Big Bad House Guest: After Big Bad blows down his own house by mistake, Humpty lets him stay at his house for the night. DVD releases: Goldie & Bear: Best Fairytale Friends
10	10	"Suddenly Spots" "A Fish Tale"	Mike Rabb Bart Jennett	December 11, 2015	0.39
Suddenly Spots: While practicing for a two-person Pogo race, Bear breaks out into colorful spots.: Song: "Playin' With You"; A Fish Tale: Bear and Papa Bear take Goldie on her first fishing trip.: Song: "Fishing With Me"
11	11	"All the Kings Men" "Cheshire Goldie"	Mike Rabb	January 25, 2016	N/A
All the King Men: The king's men forbid everything.: Song: "A Safe Kingdom is a Happy Kingdom"; Cheshire Goldie: When Goldie accidentally becomes invisible, she uses her newfound power to trick her friends.: Song: "Invisible Tango"
12	12	"The Troll Tamer" "The Froggiest Prince of All"	Claudia Silver Bart Jennett	February 1, 2016	N/A
The Troll Tamer: Goldie trains Bear to be a troll tamer and accidentally wakes up a real Troll. The Froggiest Prince of All: Bear and Humpty transform Frog into Goldie’s favorite hero, Prince Charming.: Song: "Prince Charming is Coming"
13	13	"Bear Who Would Be King" "When the Gnome is Away"	Mike Rabb	February 8, 2016	N/A
Bear Who Would Be King: Bear is declared King of Fairy Tale Forest when he removes a sword from a stone.: Song: "Easy to Be King"; When the Gnome is Away: While house sitting for Gnome, Goldie and Bear open a magic jar that brings everything to life.: Song: "What's Inside"
14	14	"Training of the Broom" "Hickory Dickory Brian"	Claudia Silver and Jorge Aguirre Bart Jennett	March 21, 2016	N/A
Training of the Broom: When Goldie and Bear find a lost witch’s broom, they take turns watching after it.: Song: "Training a Broom"; Hickory Dickory Brian: Goldie and Bear help their friend Brian the Mouse to fix the grandfather clock.: Song: "I'm Just Bad Luck"
15	15	"Giant Among Us" "Fetch Skippy Fetch"	Mike Rabb Bart Jennett	March 28, 2016	N/A
Giant Among Us: Bear accidentally collapses Giant's beanstalk, so Giant has to stay at Bear's house overnight.: Song: "Back Home"; Fetch Skippy Fetch: Big Bad Wolf tells Skippy the dragon to fetch things that aren't his.
16	16	"A Charming Day Off" "The Sunny Side Up Club"	Claudia Silver Joe Ansolabehere and Claudia Silver	April 11, 2016	N/A
A Charming Day Off: Goldie and Bear help Prince Charming evade the King’s Men.: Song: "The Life of a Prince"; The Sunny Side Up Club: Goldie and Bear help Humpty's synchronized swimming club put on a show.
17	17	"The Tooth About Jack and Jill" "Pig Problems"	Bart Jennett Joe Ansolabehere and Claudia Silver	May 16, 2016	N/A
The Tooth About Jack and Jill: Bear loses his first tooth and must tire out his house guests Jack and Jill so he can get to sleep.: Song: "Tooth Fairy Lullabye"; Pig Problems: When a petty argument breaks up the Three Little Pigs, Goldie and Bear must find a way to get them back together.
18	18	"Topsy Turvy Tea Party" "Old Knotty"	Mike Rabb Paul Germain	June 6, 2016	N/A
Topsy Turvy Tea Party: After Goldie and Bear accidentally eat the cake for the tea party, the duo must find a way to get a new one.: Song: "One Little Nibble"; Old Knotty: Goldie and Bear try to save a giant tree, Old Knotty, from being chopped down by the Woodsman.
19	19	"Fairy Fly Adventure" "Three's a Crowd"	Bart Jennett	June 23, 2016	N/A
Fairy Fly Adventure: Goldie and Bear must help Vern the inchworm get home in time so he can transform into a fairy fly. However, Big Bad attempts to stop them so he can steal their picnic food.: Song: "Home"; Three's a Crowd: Goldie becomes jealous when Bear and Red discover they have a lot in common, which Big Bad uses this to his advantage.: Song: "Things in Common"
20	20	"Sing Froggy Sing" "Forget Me Lots"	Paul Germain Mike Rabb	July 2, 2016	N/A
Sing Froggy Sing: When Frog and Papa Bear’s voices are accidentally switched, Goldie and Bear must find a way to switch them back.: Song: "The Sing-A-Ling Song"; Forget Me Lots: Bear tries to help Goldie remember who she is after she loses her memory.
21	21	"Do You Know the Muffin Kids" "Jack of All Trades"	Bart Jennett Kevin Monk and Mike Rabb	July 23, 2016	N/A
Do You Know the Muffin Kids: Goldie, Bear and Red start a muffin-baking business so they can buy a pogo stick.: Song: "Muffins"; Jack of All Trades: Goldie and Bear go on a mission to find the ultimate Mother’s Day gift for Mama Bear.
22	22	"When Goldie Met Bear"	Joe Ansolabehere and Claudia Silver	August 15, 2016	N/A
Robin Locks, Papa and Mama tells Goldie & Bear how they become best friends.: Song: "All I Need's a Friend"

=== Season 2 (2017–18) ===
No. overall	No. in season	Title	Written by	Original release date	Viewers (millions)
23	1	"Goldie's Great Adventure" "Tagalong Troll"	Claudia Silver Michael Rabb	September 18, 2017	N/A
Goldie's Great Adventure: When Goldie travels to the moon and becomes stuck, Marian Locks must rescue her.; Tagalong Troll: When Goldie saves a troll, he believes he must protect her forever.
24	2	"If the Slipper Fits" "A Royal Cheese Mystery"	Matt Hoverman Bart Jennett	September 19, 2017	N/A
If the Slipper Fits: Goldie finds a glass slipper and must choose between her best friend and being a princess.; A Royal Cheese Mystery: Goldie and Bear help solve a mystery of who ate the cheese at the Royal Cheese show.
25	3	"Little Coach Horner" "A Whale of a Tale"	Michael Rabb Matt Hoverman	September 20, 2017	N/A
Little Coach Horner: Goldie finds a replacement player after she is hurt before the big Buttercup ball game.; A Whale of a Tale: Big Bad swipes a book Humpty was in the middle of reading to Goldie, Bear and their friends.
26	4	"Pops Goes the Weasel" "Fairy Godmother Gets Grounded"	Michael Rabb Andy Guerdat & Steve Sullivan and Claudia Silver	September 21, 2017	N/A
Pops Goes the Weasel: A con man weasel visits during the Fairy Tale Forest Muffin Swap.; Fairy Godmother Gets Grounded: When Fairy Godmother's wand is taken away, Goldie and Bear show her how to help others without magic.
27	5	"Think or Swim" "Hark! A Snark!"	Claudia Silver Matt Hoverman	November 6, 2017 (U.S) November 11, 2017 (Canada)	N/A
Think of Swim: Goldie, Bear and Humpty use Giant's bathtub as a swimming pool but accidentally leave the water running.; Hark! A Snark!: Papa Bear tells Goldie and Bear of the legendary creature known as the Snark.
28	6	"Gnome Family Reunion" "Adorable Norm"	Jeff King and Bart Jennett Joe Ansolabehere	November 13, 2017 (U.S) November 18, 2017 (Canada)	N/A
Gnome Family Reunion: Gnome's cousin Rumpelstiltskin visits for the Gnome family reunion.; Adorable Norm: Goldie and Bear babysit Gnome's nephew Norm.; NOTE: This was the final role of David Lander, who voiced Rumpelstiltskin in this episode, before his death in 2020.
29	7	"Big Bad's Secret" "Sprites on the Loose"	Claudia Silver Sam Barlow	November 20, 2017 (U.S) November 25, 2017 (Canada)	N/A
Big Bad's Secret: Goldie and Bear become detectives and look for a mystery to solve.; Sprites on the Loose: Marian Locks comes back from a trip with stowaway sprites.
30	8	"Winterchime Day"	Ed Valentine	November 25, 2017	N/A
When Big Bad steals Old Man Winter's snow globe, it causes a blizzard that Goldie and Bear need to stop.
31	9	"The Fairy Tale Forest Quartet" "Bear's Hair Don't"	Michael Rabb Ed Valentine	November 27, 2017 (U.S) December 2, 2017 (Canada)	N/A
The Fairy Tale Forest Quartet: Bear tries to find a way to join a singing group while also going to the Buttercup Ball game.; Bear's Hair Don't: Goldie uses magical shampoo to fix Bear's hair on Photo Day.
32	10	"Wolf on Drums" "Goldie's Do-Over Day"	Ed Valentine Michael Rabb	December 11, 2017 (U.S) December 17, 2017 (Canada)	N/A
Wolf on Drums: When Beanstalk Jack can’t play drums in Goldie and Bear’s band, Big Bad Wolf steps in.; Goldie's Do-Over Day: Goldie uses Rosita’s Do Over spell to make everything perfect for her Gramma May’s visit.
33	11	"Gingerbread Jimmy's Fantastical Forest" "Bunny Trouble"	Joe Ansolabehere Michael Rabb	February 5, 2018 (U.S) February 10, 2018 (Canada)	N/A
Gingerbread Jimmy's Fantastical Forest: Goldie, Bear, Humpty and Red play a magical board game that takes them inside the game.; Bunny Trouble: Gnome's bunny isn't properly fed and grows to an enormous size.
34	12	"Humpty's Big Hike" "Mary, Mary"	Claudia Silver M.J. Offen	February 12, 2018 (U.S) February 17, 2018 (Canada)	N/A
Humpty's Big Hike: Papa Bear can't take the kids on a hike, so Humpty steps in to lead the way.; Mary, Mary: Goldie's cousin Mary Mary comes to visit and Goldie wants to do things differently like her.
35	13	"Any Wish You Wish" "Vote for Goldie!"	Mike Rabb Sib Ventress	February 19, 2018 (U.S) February 24, 2018 (Canada)	N/A
Any Wish You Wish: Goldie and Bear find a magic lamp with a wish-granting kid inside.; Vote for Goldie!: Goldie and Jack B. Nimble each campaign for leader of the clubhouse but make impossible promises in order to win.
36	14	"The Other Phil" "Humpty Cracks the Case"	Claudia Silver Ed Valentine	February 26, 2018 (U.S) March 3, 2018 (Canada)	N/A
The Other Phil: Big Bad decides to impersonate his brother to get free treats.; Humpty Cracks the Case: Humpty's favorite mystery writer comes for dinner but goes missing during the meal.
37	15	"Horsin' Around" "Pigs Without Twigs"	Sib Ventress Joe Ansolabehere	April 9, 2018 (U.S) April 14, 2018 (Canada)	N/A
Horsin' Around: To help a lost horse find her owner, Fairy Godmother turns her into a human.; Pigs Without Twigs: When Twigs spends time with Goldie and Bear, Brix and Baley decide they don't need her anymore.
38	16	"Mother Goose on the Loose" "Billy the Kid"	Sib Ventress Mike Rabb	April 16, 2018(U.S) April 21, 2018 (Canada)	N/A
Mother Goose on the Loose: When Mother Goose's flock flies away, she needs someone else to take of.; Billy the Kid: Bear's old friend Billy Gruff comes to visit, but his rough and tough ways bother Bear.
39	17	"Crystal Clear" "The Humongous Harvest of Hugeness"	Story by : Ed Valentine; Teleplay by : Sib Ventress Story by : Ed Valentine; Teleplay by : Claudia Silver	April 23, 2018 (U.S) April 28, 2018 (Canada)	N/A
Crystal Clear: After a crystal ball predicts an injury in Bear's future, Goldie vows to keep him safe.; The Humongous Harvest of Hugeness: Goldie and Bear agree to harvest Giant's tomatoes but it turns out to be a giant-sized task.
40	18	"Team Tiny" "The Wolf Who Cried Wolf"	Joe Ansolabehere Story by : Ed Valentine; Teleplay by : Brian Swenlin	April 30, 2018 (U.S) May 5, 2018 (Canada)	N/A
Team Tiny: After Mama Bear's ring disappears, the kids get help from their tiny friends to find it.; The Wolf Who Cried Wolf: After Big Bad is accused of a crime he didn't commit, Goldie and Bear search for the truth.
41	19	"Goin' Overboard" "All Hail the Conquering Bear"	Sib Ventress Jonathan Rosenthal	June 4, 2018 (U.S) June 9, 2018 (Canada)	N/A
Goin' Overboard: Bear tries to make some improvements to Papa's boat for Father's Day.; All Hail the Conquering Bear: After an out-of-control windmill gets fixed, the citizens mistake Bear for the one who saved the day.
42	20	"Mr. Pail" "Goldie Rides a Bike"	Suzanne Jennett Joe Ansolabehere	June 11, 2018 (U.S) June 16, 2018 (Canada)	N/A
Mr. Pail: When Jack and Jill's new friend, Mr. Pail, goes missing, Goldie and Bear help search for him.; Goldie Rides a Bike: Bear tries to teach Goldie how to ride a bike in time for the Tour D'Prince.
43	21	"Viva Don Huevo!" "The Magic Handcuffs"	Sib Ventress Joe Ansolabehere	June 18, 2018 (U.S) June 23, 2018 (Canada)	N/A
Viva Don Huevo!: A spell makes Humpty think he's a swashbuckling hero that performs daring rescues.; The Magic Handcuffs: During her magic act, Goldie and Big Bad Wolf accidentally get handcuffed together.
44	22	"Tess the Giantess" "Red Moves Away"	Sib Ventress Joe Ansolabehere	June 25, 2018 (U.S) June 30, 2018 (Canada)	N/A
Tess the Giantess: Goldie and Bear meet the perfect friend for Giant, but he gets too nervous around her.; Red Moves Away: After his father gets a new job, Goldie and Bear try to keep Red from moving away.
45	23	"Witch Cat is Which?" "Trick or Treat Trouble"	Sib Ventress Bart Jennett	October 1, 2018 (U.S) October 6, 2018 (Canada)	0.53
Witch Cat is Which?: Goldie and Bear attempt to pet sit Ginger's cat, Sprinkles, after he gets into Ginger's bag of doubling dust and instead of 1 there are 3 Sprinkles causing mischief around Fairytale Forest.; Trick or Treat Trouble: Goldie and Bear try their new Halloween costumes. Originally, Bear goes as a sandwich and Goldie as a wizard of stuff around the house. But when Goldie doesn't like her costume and dresses up as a sandwich too, Bear gets jealous and sad because her costume is better and she copied his idea. In the end, they both turn up to Ginger's Halloween party with Goldie as a sandwich and Bear as a milkshake.; Note: This is the series finale.
