= List of Alma's Way episodes =

Alma's Way is an animated children's television series from Fred Rogers Productions created and executive produced by former Sesame Street actress Sonia Manzano and animated by Canadian animation studio Pipeline Studios. The series airs on PBS Kids, and premiered on October 4, 2021.

The series was renewed for a second season which premiered on September 18, 2023.

On February 28, 2025, it was announced the series was renewed for a third season.

== Series overview ==
Season	Segments	Episodes	Originally released	
Season	Segments	Episodes	First released	Last released
1	76	39 (Note: Although Season 1 in actuality has 40 episodes, the second-to-last episode of the season ("Snow Day in the Bronx/Say I Guess to the Dress") isn't considered part of the series' official ordering by PBS (as the second segment went unaired for reasons unknown, and the first was delayed and eventually released on the PBS Kids YouTube channel in 2025, during the airing of the second season), and is thus omitted from this total count. On October 18, 2024, the episode was temporarily released on the website and video app, before being removed on the same day.)	October 4, 2021	October 18, 2024
2	45	23	September 18, 2023	October 1, 2025
3	TBA	TBA	January 19, 2026	TBA

== Episodes ==
=== Season 1 (2021–24) ===
No. overall	No. in season	Title	Written by	Original release date	Prod. code
1	1	"No-Go Mofongo"	Written by : Dana Chan; Storyboarded by : Steve Remen	October 4, 2021	101
1	1	"Alma vs. Eddie"	Written by : Jorge Aguirre; Storyboarded by : Wesley Bryant	October 4, 2021	101
"No-Go Mofongo": Alma wants to help Mami fix her mofongo, but she makes it worse. She thinks about it, and realizes she should've asked Mami for help. "Alma vs. Eddie": Alma and Eddie are in a silly prank war, but when Alma takes it too far, Eddie gets mad at her. She thinks about it, and realizes that while she was having fun, Eddie wasn't.
2	2	"Alma the Artist"	Written by : Jorge Aguirre; Storyboarded by : Allan Jeffery	October 4, 2021	102
2	2	"Bomba or Baseball?"	Written by : Ernie Bustamante; Storyboarded by : Frank Lintzen	October 4, 2021	102
"Alma the Artist": Alma wants to make a mural for Mr. Huda's store, and she enlists the help of André. However, he keeps changing her design. She thinks about it, and realizes that she should speak up for herself. "Bomba or Baseball?": Alma wants to go to a bomba dance for her Uncle Nestor, and go to the baseball game, but, they're both on the same day. She thinks about it, and realizes that she should honor her commitment to go to Uncle Nestor's bomba dance.
3	3	"Alma's Movie Night"	Written by : Dana Chan; Storyboarded by : Wesley Bryant	October 5, 2021	103
3	3	"Papi the Hero"	Written by : Bernice Vanderlaan; Storyboarded by : Frank Ramirez	October 5, 2021	103
"Alma's Movie Night": The kids are heading to Movie Night in the park, but André is really scared. Alma decides to help him so he can see the movie, but he tells her the truth. She thinks about it, and realizes that André is scared. "Papi the Hero": Alma, Eddie, and Junior think that their dad/uncle, Ruben, is a hero, and want to make a song about him. They decide to get inspiration from him saving a parrot, but she keeps escaping. Alma thinks about it, and realizes that she, Junior, and Eddie are scaring her.
4	4	"Doggone Sox"	Written by : Bernice Vanderlaan; Storyboarded by : Allan Jeffery	October 6, 2021	104
4	4	"Alma Spells It Out"	Written by : Ernie Bustamante; Storyboarded by : Frank Lintzen	October 6, 2021	104
"Doggone Sox": Alma has a dog named Chacho, and he likes to hide things. Abuelo's lucky sock is missing, and if Alma can't find it, Chacho can't spend the night with her. She thinks about it, and realizes that she should look close to the ground like Chacho. "Alma Spells It Out": Every young kid in town is signing up for the Spelling Bee, including Alma. On the day of the Bronx Spelling Bee, she loses, and is not happy to be an alternate. She thinks about it, and realizes that she needs to practice.
5	5	"Cardboard Club"	Written by : Kris Marvin Hughes; Storyboarded by : Allan Jeffery	October 7, 2021	106
5	5	"Alma Clues In"	Written by : Bernice Vanderlaan; Storyboarded by : Frank Lintzen	October 7, 2021	106
"Cardboard Club": Alma, Rafia, and André find a cardboard box and want to turn it into a clubhouse. But when Eddie, Becka, and Junior join the Cardboard Club, there's even less room in the clubhouse. Alma wants everyone to play together. She thinks about it, and realizes that they can make a Cardboard Club City. "Alma Clues In": Rafia and André are going to share an orange piragua, but it disappears when they get to the park. Alma has to solve the case of where the piragua went. She thinks about it, and realizes she needs to look for clues.
6	6	"Alma's Showstopper"	Written by : Miklos Perlus; Storyboarded by : Jacob MacMillan	October 11, 2021	107
6	6	"Ultimate Helper"	Written by : Dana Chan; Storyboarded by : Frank Ramirez	October 11, 2021	107
"Alma's Showstopper": Alma convinces Lucas to sing at Open Mic Monday, but Lucas has stage fright. She needs to find a way to help him. She realizes that Lucas can conquer his stage fright if someone he loves can see him. "Ultimate Helper": Alma's Tía Gloria loves to help people, and so does Alma. Alma wants to be an Ultimate Helper, but messes things up and doesn't feel happy when her friends help her. She thinks about it, and realizes that the reason she didn't like it when her friends helped her was because she was being greedy.
7	7	"Coqui Quest"	Written by : Rodney Stringfellow; Storyboarded by : Allan Jeffery	October 12, 2021	108
7	7	"Chalk the Block"	Written by : Paul Moncrieffe; Storyboarded by : Frank Lintzen	October 12, 2021	108
"Coqui Quest": Alma and her friends play a game, hoping they might find a coquí frog that only lives in Puerto Rico. But soon the game gets old. Alma thinks about it, and realizes while they may not find coquí frogs, they can use their imagination. "Chalk the Block": When André's giant "Chalk the Block" masterpiece is ruined (the rain soaks his art project on the sidewalk), Alma must help re-do it before everyone arrives to see it. But, how will they be able to redo it all in time? Alma thinks and realizes they need more people to help.
8	8	"Alma on Ice"	Written by : Miklos Perlus; Storyboarded by : Jacob MacMillan	October 13, 2021	109
8	8	"Junior's Lost Tooth"	Written by : Jorge Aguirre; Storyboarded by : Stephen Baker	October 13, 2021	109
"Alma on Ice": When Rafia has trouble ice skating for the first time, Alma must find a way to help her without making her feel self-conscious. Becoming an ice queen is really hard! She thinks about it, and realizes that she just needs to help Rafia. "Junior's Lost Tooth": When Junior loses his first tooth, he is very sad. What will cheer him up? Alma thinks about it, and realizes that Junior is sad because he can't show off his tooth, and the way to make him happy is finding it.
9	9	"Beatbox Big Time"	Written by : Rodney Stringfellow; Storyboarded by : Laura Horobin	October 14, 2021	110
9	9	"Super Sisters"	Written by : Kris Marvin Hughes; Storyboarded by : Frank Ramirez	October 14, 2021	110
"Beatbox Big Time": Alma wants to beatbox, but she doesn't want to practice. When she performs out in the backyard, she does horrible. Alma thinks about it, and realizes the reason she didn't do well was because she didn't practice; so she had to try again for the 2nd performance - and things went really, really well this time! "Super Sisters": Lulú and Gloria are Super Sisters, so Alma wants to be a super sister for Junior. But during playtime, Alma causes Junior to get super upset. Alma thinks about it, and realizes that Super Sisters help their siblings, like her mom and tía.
10	10	"Basketball Birds"	Written by : Dana Chan; Storyboarded by : Stephen Baker	October 18, 2021	111
10	10	"Looking for Litter"	Written by : Michael Rodriguez; Storyboarded by : Jacob MacMillan	October 18, 2021	111
"Basketball Birds": Alma and Rafia want to play basketball, but there's a bird nest on the hoop! Now, they have to keep the birds safe. Alma thinks about it, and realizes that she should tell someone. "Looking for Litter:" The town park is a mess! So, Alma and the gang try to figure out where the litter is coming from. Alma thinks about it, and realizes that they are the ones littering.
11	11	"Socks for Sale"	Written by : Bernice Vanderlaan; Storyboarded by : Laura Horobin	October 19, 2021	112
11	11	"Alma's Animal Show"	Written by : Ernie Bustamante; Storyboarded by : Frank Lintzen	October 19, 2021	112
"Socks for Sale": When Chacho chews holes in the socks that Alma was planning to donate for the Community Center's Bomba Drum Fundraiser, she has to figure out a way to transform the holey mess into a new success. Alma thinks about it, and realizes that she can turn the socks into something new. "Alma's Animal Show": Alma offers to record Papi's animal show while he's busy and recruits her friends and their talented pets to help. But Alma keeps messing up on the camera, plus the battery on her tablet died. Will this week's show be cancelled? Alma thinks about it, and realizes that it takes a team to make a show, not just one person.
12	12	"Junior's Story"	Written by : Rodney Stringfellow; Storyboarded by : Stephen Baker	October 25, 2021	113
12	12	"Anniversary Surprise"	Written by : Dana Chan; Storyboarded by : Jacob MacMillan	October 25, 2021	113
"Junior's Story": Junior really wants to find a book about a Puerto Rican boy, dinosaurs, and the Bronx, but Alma and André can't find any stories that have all three at the bookstore. Alma thinks about it, and realizes that she can help Junior make his own book. "Anniversary Surprise": Alma and Eddie want to surprise Nestor and Gloria for their anniversary, but when Gloria gets called into work unexpectedly, their party plans might be a bust. Alma thinks about it, and realizes that Gloria and Nestor need to be together anywhere, not just at home.
13	13	"Alma's New Kicks"	Written by : Miklos Perlus; Storyboarded by : Laura Horobin	October 26, 2021	114
13	13	"Star Ball"	Written by : Melinda LaRose; Storyboarded by : Frank Lintzen	October 26, 2021	114
"Alma's New Kicks": Mami surprises Alma with a perfect pair of brand-new soccer cleats to replace her old ones. But now Alma must choose: play her best soccer game and get her amazing new shoes dirty or protect her cleats by staying on the sidelines. Alma thinks about it, and realizes that marks can be used as memories. "Star Ball": Stuck inside on a beautiful day, Alma, Rafia, and André make up a new game called Star Ball. It's a blast at first, but her friends don't want to play anymore when Alma keeps changing the rules. What did she do wrong? Alma thinks about it, and realizes that where she went wrong was that she kept changing the rules unfairly.
14	14	"Alma's Noche Buena"	Written by : Rosemary Contreras; Storyboarded by : Jacob MacMillan	December 13, 2021	105
14	14	"Three Kings Day Do-Over"	Written by : Michael Rodriguez; Storyboarded by : Frank Ramirez	December 13, 2021	105
"Alma's Noche Buena": It's Alma's favorite holiday, Noche Buena (or Christmas Eve), and she can't wait to celebrate her family's yearly traditions. But when the traditions go wrong, Alma feels disappointed. Can she still have a fun Noche Buena when things are so different? "Three Kings Day Do-Over": It's Three Kings Day! When Alma finds the Christmas gift she gave Junior is still under the tree, she decides to skip playtime with her brother and make him a do-over gift before the big parade. But Junior isn't thrilled.
15	15	"Alma's Rescue Repair"	Written by : Bernice Vanderlaan; Storyboarded by : Jacob MacMillan	January 10, 2022	115
15	15	"Alma Cools Off"	Written by : Rodney Stringfellow; Storyboarded by : Stephen Baker	January 10, 2022	115
"Alma's Rescue Repair": After repairing Junior's castle, Alma decides to start her own repairing business called "Alma's Rescue Repair". But running back and forth is very tedious and takes longer. How can Alma do it quicker? She thinks about it, and realizes that she should make her own mini-repair shop. "Alma Cools Off": Alma and her friend, Howard, are playing water tag on a hot day. But, Howard won't let Junior play! When Howard wants to play with Alma, Junior, and Rafia, Alma doesn't know what to tell him. She thinks about it, and realizes that she should let him play and tell how Junior felt.
16	16	"Song of the Summer"	Written by : Miklos Perlus; Storyboarded by : Jacob MacMillan	January 11, 2022	117
16	16	"Leapin' Lizards"	Written by : Melinda LaRose; Storyboarded by : Stephen Baker	January 11, 2022	117
"Song of the Summer": Alma's family is invited to the Sunny Soto concert, and get tickets in person too. She invites her friends to come, but it turns out her parents don't want her friends to come. She thinks about it, and realizes that she should have asked Lulú first. "Leapin' Lizards": Alma gets to meet an animal at her Papi's workplace. But when she meets the animal, Frankie Four-Feet's bearded dragon named DJ Jelly, Alma finds it creepy. During feeding time, DJ Jelly accidentally gets loose. How can Alma keep her fear from getting the better of her? She thinks about it, and realizes the way to conquer her fear is to learn more about the lizard.
17	17	"Singing on the 6 Train"	Written by : Kris Marvin Hughes; Storyboarded by : Ian Jeans	January 12, 2022	118
17	17	"Safina's Doggy Problem"	Written by : Ami Boghani; Storyboarded by : Frank Lintzen	January 12, 2022	118
"Singing on the 6 Train": Alma, André, and Lucas are doing a special squirrel performance with Tía Gloria. But she has to go to work on the 6 Train. When the kids perform, Alma feels bad and wishes that Gloria could be there. She thinks about it, and realizes that she and her friends can perform on the 6 Train for Gloria. "Safina's Doggy Problem": Alma and Safina are taking pictures of puppies up for adoption. Something strange is going on: even though the dogs love Safina, today they won't go near her because of lemon juice that got onto her clothes! After multiple attempts, Alma wonders what she can do to help. She thinks about it, and realizes that there might be something different about today that's making the dogs stay away.
18	18	"Too Corny"	Written by : Utkarsh Rajawat; Storyboarded by : Jacob MacMillan	January 13, 2022	119
18	18	"Alma Tags Along"	Written by : Monique D. Hall; Storyboarded by : Stephen Baker	January 13, 2022	119
"Too Corny": During a visit to the Community Garden, Alma gets to pick a veggie to add to Abuelo's Super Slurpy Spaghetti Supper. She finds one of her favorite foods, corn, but she takes too much. Alma thinks about it, and realizes that she was being selfish and should have taken only what she needed. "Alma Tags Along": Junior and Lulú are going on a special mother-son day. When Alma hears that they're going to the Bacon Donut Shop, she wants to come, but her mom says no 'cause she and Alma just had a day out. So, Alma tries to hang out with them, but Junior's not happy. When they go to the Bacon Donut Shop, but she's not sure if she should go or not. She thinks about it, and realizes that she shouldn't go.
19	19	"Granny on the Go"	Written by : Dana Chan; Storyboarded by : Ian Jeans	May 2, 2022	116
19	19	"Chacho's Day Out"	Written by : Jorge Aguirre; Storyboarded by : Frank Ramirez	May 2, 2022	116
"Granny on the Go": Alma is excited when she finds out her Granny Isa is visiting. But, when she finds out Isa isn't able to visit due to a storm, she is really sad because they can't do the Viennese Waltz. What can Alma do now? She thinks about it, and realizes that she can still be able to spend the day with Isa. "Chacho's Day Out": Alma, Junior, Mami, and Chacho are going to the new playground. Chacho is really excited to play in the playground. However, the playground says that dogs are not allowed. Chacho then becomes very upset. Alma and her brother wonder: why is Chacho sad? She thinks about it, and realizes that he would rather play with them face-to-face.
20	20	"Checkers Champ"	Written by : Sheila Rogerson; Storyboarded by : Jacob MacMillan	May 3, 2022	121
20	20	"World's Greatest"	Written by : Ashley Griffis; Storyboarded by : Stephen Baker	May 3, 2022	121
"Checkers Champ": When André gets nervous about playing against grownups in a checkers tournament, Coach Alma is there to help. "World's Greatest": Alma and Rafia love to compete to see who's the World's Greatest at various skills. But can they figure out who is the World's Greatest Artist?
21	21	"Steggie Rescue"	Written by : Bernice Vanderlaan; Storyboarded by : Ian Jeans	May 4, 2022	122
21	21	"Alma Hits the Right Note"	Written by : Miklos Perlus; Storyboarded by : Frank Ramirez	May 4, 2022	122
"Steggie Rescue": At a sleepover, Alma, Eddie, and Junior play a late-night game with Steggie. "Alma Hits the Right Note": Alma decides she wants to play piano when she sees Mami having a great time teaching another student.
22	22	"Do the Waltzango"	Written by : Melinda LaRose; Storyboarded by : Ian Jeans	May 5, 2022	120
22	22	"Big Brother Bootcamp"	Written by : Isabel Galupo; Storyboarded by : Frank Lintzen	May 5, 2022	120
"Do the Waltzango": When Eddie and Becka can't agree on what kind of dance to do together, Alma helps the pair create a brand-new, mash-up dance. "Big Brother Bootcamp": When Eddie overhears that there may be a new baby in his family, Alma teaches him how to be a great big brother.
23	23	"Alma's Book Swap"	Written by : Kris Marvin Hughes; Storyboarded by : Frank Ramirez	July 11, 2022	123
23	23	"Finders Keepers"	Written by : Sonia Manzano; Storyboarded by : Stephen Baker	July 11, 2022	123
"Alma's Book Swap": When the library is under renovation, Alma finds a way for everyone in the community to gather and share books with one another. "Finders Keepers": Alma finds a lost doll in the park and struggles when she wants to keep it.
24	24	"Lucas Left Out"	Written by : Rodney Stringfellow; Storyboarded by : Ian Jeans	July 12, 2022	124
24	24	"The Sweetest Treat"	Written by : Ami Boghani; Storyboarded by : Frank Lintzen	July 12, 2022	124
"Lucas Left Out": Alma helps Lucas feel better after he misses out on a trip to the Statue of Liberty. "The Sweetest Treat": When Doña Carmen has trouble recreating an old recipe for coconetes, Alma and André dig into their neighborhood's history to help her get it right.
25	25	"Alma Picked a Pepper"	Written by : Dana Chan; Storyboarded by : Jacob MacMillan	July 13, 2022	125
25	25	"The Alma Train"	Written by : Miklos Perlus; Storyboarded by : Stephen Baker	July 13, 2022	125
"Alma Picked a Pepper": Alma is so excited that she's grown a pepper that looks like Chacho because she forgot to give credit to the person who helped her succeed. "The Alma Train:" When Alma has to ride the 6 train all day, she finds out that the ride is more fun than she thought.
26	26	"Chacho Gets a Bath"	Written by : Michael J. Beall; Storyboarded by : Ian Jeans	July 14, 2022	128
26	26	"Frankie's Four Feet"	Written by : Edlin Ortiz; Storyboarded by : Frank Lintzen	July 14, 2022	128
"Chacho Gets a Bath": When a dirty Chacho runs away at the park, Alma, Junior, and Abuelo must track him down for a bath. "Frankie's Four Feet": Alma realizes that there's more to Frankie's old breakdancing sneakers than she thinks.
27	27	"Trick or Treatasaurus"	Written by : Bernice Vanderlaan; Storyboarded by : Stephen Baker	October 10, 2022	138
27	27	"The Haunted Hallway"	Written by : Utkarsh Rajawat; Storyboarded by : Jacob MacMillan	October 10, 2022	138
"Trick or Treatasaurus": When Junior accidentally ruins his dinosaur costume, Alma helps him find a way to turn his mistake into a fright-night delight. "The Haunted Hallway": When Alma, Rafia, and Lucas are in charge of the Haunted Hallway, Alma takes the spookiness a little too far.
28	28	"Community Campout"	Written by : Ashley Griffis; Storyboarded by : Stephen Baker	October 11, 2022	131
28	28	"Leaf it to Alma"	Written by : Dana Chan; Storyboarded by : Jacob MacMillan	October 11, 2022	131
"Community Campout": Alma accidentally embarrasses Rafia during the sleepover at the community center. "Leaf it to Alma": Alma tries to find enough leaves for everyone to go leaf-jumping.
29	29	"Alma's Best Friend"	Written by : Jeannette Lara; Storyboarded by : Stephen Baker	October 12, 2022	127
29	29	"Steggie Gets Lost"	Written by : Sonia Manzano; Storyboarded by : Jacob MacMillan	October 12, 2022	127
"Alma's Best Friend": When Alma has to choose a best friend to give a friendship bracelet to, she's not sure whom to pick. "Steggie Gets Lost": Alma figures out how to help Junior find his lost dinosaur.
30	30	"Lost in the Bronx"	Written by : Rodney Stringfellow; Storyboarded by : Frank Lintzen	October 13, 2022	136
30	30	"New Neighbors"	Written by : Jorge Aguirre; Storyboarded by : Ian Jeans	October 13, 2022	136
"Lost in the Bronx": When Alma and Uncle Nestor get separated from the rest of the family on the subway, Alma relies on a plan she made with Mami to reunite them. "New Neighbors": Alma and Junior are excited about their new neighbors.
31	31	"All About Alma"	Written by : Ernie Bustamante; Storyboarded by : Jacob MacMillan	January 23, 2023	129
31	31	"Alma's Playdate"	Written by : Melinda LaRose; Storyboarded by : Stephen Baker	January 23, 2023	129
"All About Alma": When Alma is consumed with her starring role in a musical, she doesn't understand why her friends aren't happy for her. "Alma's Playdate": Alma helps Harper feel at home during a playdate at the Rivera house.
32	32	"Alma Town"	Written by : Edlin Ortiz; Storyboarded by : Jacob MacMillan	January 24, 2023	137
32	32	"Alma's Big Help"	Written by : Melinda LaRose; Storyboarded by : Stephen Baker	January 24, 2023	137
"Alma Town": Alma has to learn how to make rules that are fair for everyone when she is elected mayor of Cardboard City. "Alma's Big Help": Alma and Junior learn that little acts of kindness make a big difference.
33	33	"Picture Perfect"	Written by : Edlin Ortiz; Storyboarded by : Frank Lintzen	January 25, 2023	134
33	33	"Hands for the Day"	Written by : Jeannette Lara; Storyboarded by : Ian Jeans	January 25, 2023	134
"Picture Perfect": Alma and Rafia want to make an animal photo book, but the animals won't cooperate. What could Alma do to get the perfect pictures for Rafia's photos? She thinks about it, and realizes that nothing was wrong with Rafia's photos. "Hands for the Day": Alma and Rafia volunteer to help Safina after she hurts her arm. It seems that Rafia and Alma took things a little too far. But they've tried again, and things worked out for 'Safina's Way'!
34	34	"Howard Flies the Coop"	Written by : Utkarsh Rajawat; Storyboarded by : Ian Jeans	January 26, 2023	130
34	34	"Supper Surprise"	Written by : Rodney Stringfellow; Storyboarded by : Frank Lintzen	January 26, 2023	130
"Howard Flies the Coop": Alma and her friends try to help Howard get over his fear of pigeons. "Supper Surprise": Alma is invited to have dinner with André and his dad.
35	35	"Alma's Cat-tastrophe"	Written by : Sheila Rogerson; Storyboarded by : Ian Jeans	April 24, 2023	126
35	35	"Stickball!"	Written by : Jorge Aguirre; Storyboarded by : Frank Lintzen	April 24, 2023	126
"Alma's Cat-tastrophe": Alma helps Mr. Ramirez figure out what to do when he lets too many cats into his shoe shop. "Stickball!": Alma tries to convince Howard to play stickball.
36	36	"Harper's Quick Change"	Written by : Ami Boghani; Storyboarded by : Ian Jeans	April 25, 2023	132
36	36	"All Rapped Up"	Written by : Michael J. Beall; Storyboarded by : Frank Lintzen	April 25, 2023	132
"Harper's Quick Change": Alma, Harper, and Rafia make a robot video. "All Rapped Up": Eddie asks Alma to help him record a rap, but his project gets derailed when it turns into a rap circle with Junior, André, and Becka.
37	37	"The Beach Blahs"	Written by : Rodney Stringfellow; Storyboarded by : Jacob MacMillan	April 26, 2023	133
37	37	"The Last Sandcastle"	Written by : Melinda LaRose; Storyboarded by : Stephen Baker	April 26, 2023	133
"The Beach Blahs": Alma's new friend, Beto, is disappointed that the beach in the Bronx isn't like the one he is used to in San Diego. "The Last Sandcastle": When Junior's sandcastle gets washed away by the tide, Alma tries to cheer him up.
N–A	N–A	"Snow Day in the Bronx"	Written by : Sonia Manzano; Storyboarded by : Jacob MacMillian	October 18, 2024 (Note: Although Season 1 in actuality has 40 episodes, the second-to-last episode of the season isn't considered part of the series' official ordering by PBS (as the second segment went unaired for reasons unknown, and the first was delayed and eventually released on the PBS Kids YouTube channel on January 13, 2025, during the airing of the second season). On October 18, 2024, the episode was temporarily released on the website and video app, before being removed on the same day.)	135
N–A	N–A	"Say I Guess to the Dress"	Written by : Utkarsh Rajawat; Storyboarded by : Stephen Baker	October 18, 2024	135
"Snow Day in the Bronx": Alma and her friends must change their movie plans when a snowstorm causes a power outage. "Say I Guess to the Dress": Alma isn't sure what she should wear to a fancy party.
38	38	"Alma Goes to Puerto Rico"	Written by : Jorge Aguirre and Dana Chan; Storyboarded by : Jacob MacMillan, Stephen Baker, Ian Jeans, Frank Lintzen	June 5, 2023	139
39 (Note: This is an hour-long special.)	39	"Alma Goes to Puerto Rico"	Written by : Jorge Aguirre and Dana Chan; Storyboarded by : Jacob MacMillan, Stephen Baker, Ian Jeans, Frank Lintzen	June 5, 2023	140
Part 1: Bomba on the Beach: When Alma and her family travel to Puerto Rico to visit Papi's family, Alma can't wait to dance Bomba on the beach; her dancing plans are put on hold when an unmarked package containing a beautiful Bomba skirt is dropped in front of her bisabuela. Part 2: Bisabuela's Birthday: On Alma's great-grandmother's 100th birthday, Alma wants to find Bisabuela the perfect gift; even though she can think of all kinds of things that Bisabuela likes, none of them are quite right.

=== Season 2 (2023–25) ===
No. overall	No. in season	Title	Written by	Original release date	Prod. code
40	1	"Justice Sonia and Judge Alma"	Written by : Sonia Manzano; Storyboarded by : Anthony Labonte	September 18, 2023	207
40	1	"Justice Sonia and Umpire Alma"	Written by : Dana Chan; Storyboarded by : Pedro Munyoz Mesa	September 18, 2023	207
"Justice Sonia and Judge Alma": Inspired by Supreme Court Justice Sonia Sotomayor, Alma tries to help her friends determine what's fair. "Justice Sonia and Umpire Alma": Justice Sotomayor encourages Alma to be an umpire at a kickball game.
41	2	"To Break or Not to Break?"	Written by : Edlin Ortiz; Storyboarded by : Ian Jeans	September 19, 2023	202
41	2	"The New Mr. Octy"	Written by : Rodney Stringfellow; Storyboarded by : Gómez Álvarez	September 19, 2023	202
"To Break or Not to Break?": Alma senses that Beto is hesitant about breaking his pinata and wants to find out why. "The New Mr. Octy": Alma regrets her decision to give away an old toy she doesn't play with anymore.
42	3	"Mofongo on the Go Go"	Written by : Alyson Piekarsky; Storyboarded by : Ian Jeans	September 20, 2023	206
42	3	"Alma Scoots Around"	Written by : Michael Olmo; Storyboarded by : Gómez Álvarez	September 20, 2023	206
"Mofongo on the Go Go": Alma and Eddie open a mofongo food truck, but they ran out of time to make the mofongo. "Alma Scoots Around": Alma challenges André to scooter races to prove she is faster.
43	4	"Piragua Problem"	Written by : Utkarsh Rajawat; Storyboarded by : Ian Jeans	September 21, 2023	210
43	4	"Balloon Blues"	Written by : Ami Boghani; Storyboarded by : Gómez Álvarez	September 21, 2023	210
"Piragua Problem": Mr. Piragua Man names a new flavor after Alma. But it turns out that Alma doesn't like the taste of all her colors she chose for her 'Alma Special'. Meanwhile, Mr. Piragua Man keeps giving her the same piragua over and over again. What could Alma do to solve her piragua problem? She thinks about it, and realizes that Howard could use Alma's piragua at the end - it was called the 'Howard Special'! "Balloon Blues": Alma wants to keep playing with balloon animals, but André doesn't want to play anymore because his balloon popped by accident.
44	5	"Alma the B-Girl"	Written by : Bernice Vanderlaan; Storyboarded by : Anthony Labonte	March 4, 2024	211
44	5	"Chacho's Birthday"	Written by : Sonia Manzano; Storyboarded by : Pedro Munyoz Mesa	March 4, 2024	211
"Alma the B-Girl": Junior gets frustrated when Alma distracts him from learning a dance. "Chacho's Birthday": Alma wants to celebrate Chacho's birthday.
45	6	"The Missing Vote"	Written by : Melinda LaRose; Storyboarded by : Anthony Labonte	March 5, 2024	205
45	6	"Alma's Lemonade and Everything Else Stand"	Written by : Lalo Alcaraz; Storyboarded by : Pedro Munyoz Mesa	March 5, 2024	205
"The Missing Vote": Alma and her friends must vote for either a new board game or art supplies. "Alma's Lemonade and Everything Else Stand": Alma and Harper open a lemonade stand.
46	7	"Howard Brings the Beat"	Written by : Bernice Vanderlaan; Storyboarded by : Anthony Labonte	March 6, 2024	203
46	7	"Alma's Payday"	Written by : Jorge Aguirre; Storyboarded by : Pedro Munyoz Mesa	March 6, 2024	203
"Howard Brings the Beat": Alma helps Howard find a drum when he joins the neighborhood drum circle. "Alma's Payday": Alma and Junior try to earn toy tickets.
47	8	"A Tale of Two Almas"	Written by : Dana Chan; Storyboarded by : Anthony Labonte	March 7, 2024	201
47	8	"The Longest Race"	Written by : Jorge Aguirre; Storyboarded by : Pedro Munyoz Mesa	March 7, 2024	201
"A Tale of Two Almas": Alma teaches Emi how to be like her, but now Emi won't stop imitating Alma. "The Longest Race": Alma tries to finish running the world's longest race.
48	9	"Goodbye, Howard!"	Written by : Isabel Galupo; Storyboarded by : Armando Gómez Álvarez	March 8, 2024	214
48	9	"Re-Use Re-Do"	Written by : Utkarsh Rajawat; Storyboarded by : Ian Jeans	March 8, 2024	214
"Goodbye, Howard!": Alma tells all her friends that Howard is moving. "Re-Use Re-do": Alma wonders if she should buy new materials for her recycled art project.
49	10	"Museum Day Way"	Written by : Dana Chan; Storyboarded by : Anthony Labonte	September 23, 2024	215
49	10	"Bronxorama Diorama"	Written by : Jorge Aguirre; Storyboarded by : Pedro Munyoz Mesa	September 23, 2024	215
"Museum Day Way": Alma wants to see everything at the museum fast, and Junior wants to go slow. "Bronxorama Diorama": Alma's friends want to add their favorite things to Alma's Bronx diorama.
50	11	"Alma's Yes Day"	Written by : Melinda LaRose; Storyboarded by : Gómez Álvarez	September 24, 2024	216
50	11	"Alma's Hypothe-Saur"	Written by : Utkarsh Rajawat; Storyboarded by : Ian Jeans	September 24, 2024	216
"Alma's Yes Day": When the family agrees to a day of saying yes to everyone and everything, Alma realizes that sometimes you have to say no. "Alma's Hypothe-Saur": Alma helps Junior and Emi test out their dinosaur hypotheses at the American Museum of Natural History.
51	12	"Uncle Nestor's Bumpy Ride"	Written by : Rodney Stringfellow; Storyboarded by : Anthony Labonte	September 25, 2024	209
51	12	"Grocery Goof"	Written by : Melinda LaRose; Storyboarded by : Pedro Munyoz Mesa	September 25, 2024	209
"Uncle Nestor's Bumpy Ride": Alma and Junior try to teach Uncle Nestor how to ride his first bike. "Grocery Goof": When Papi lets Alma go to the grocery store by herself, she realizes that she needs to focus to complete her mission.
52	13	"A Gift for Granny"	Written by : Jeannette Lara; Storyboarded by : Ian Jeans	September 26, 2024	204
52	13	"Soccer Friends"	Written by : Utkarsh Rajawat; Storyboarded by : Armando Gómez Álvarez	September 26, 2024	204
"A Gift For Granny": Alma is putting together a care package for Granny Isa, but did she pack the right things? "Soccer Friends": Alma hypes up Beto and Rafia so much that they get nervous to play each other in soccer.
53	14	"Alma Wings It"	Written by : Alyson Piekarsky; Storyboarded by : Anthony Labonte	September 27, 2024 (PBS Kids Channel); March 2025 (PBS Kids App)	213
53	14	"The Grandparent Trap"	Written by : Rodney Stringfellow; Storyboarded by : Pedro Munyoz Mesa	September 27, 2024 (PBS Kids Channel); March 2025 (PBS Kids App)	213
"Alma Wings It": Granny Isa teaches Alma and Junior how to be flight attendants. "The Grandparent Trap": Alma tries to get her grandparents to remarry so her whole family can be together all the time.
54	15	"No Sleep 'til New Year's"	Written by : Dana Chan; Storyboarded by : Anthony Labonte	December 2, 2024	223
54	15	"Nurse Alma"	Written by : Sonia Manzano; Storyboarded by : Pedro Munyoz Mesa	December 2, 2024	223
55	16	"Big Kid Hangout"	Written by : Rodney Stringfellow; Storyboarded by : Anthony Labonte	April 28, 2025	219
55	16	"Little Brother Loan"	Written by : Michael Olmo; Storyboarded by : Pedro Munyoz Mesa	April 28, 2025	219
56	17	"Subway All-Stars"	Written by : Sonia Manzano; Storyboarded by : Ian Jeans	April 29, 2025	220
56	17	"Bunches of Beads"	Written by : Edlin Ortiz; Storyboarded by : Armando Gómez Álvarez	April 29, 2025	220
57	18	"Alma on the Moo-ve"	Written by : Billy Lopez; Storyboarded by : Anthony Labonte	April 30, 2025	221
57	18	"The Lucas Look"	Written by : Melinda LaRose; Storyboarded by : Pedro Munyoz Mesa	April 30, 2025	221
58	19	"Alma's Summertime Musical"	Written by : Jorge Aguirre & Dana Chan; Story by : Pedro Munyoz Mesa; Storyboarded by : Anthony Labonte	June 9, 2025	225
59	20	"Alma-Papi Day"	Written by : JP Meier; Storyboarded by : Armando Gómez Álvarez	June 10, 2025	222
59	20	"Alma's Special Ticket"	Written by : Maria Escobedo; Storyboarded by : Ian Jeans	June 10, 2025	222
60	21	"To Tell or Not to Tell"	Written by : JP Meier; Storyboarded by : Pedro Munyoz Mesa	September 29, 2025	217
60	21	"Potluck Snack Time"	Written by : Joey Clift; Storyboarded by : Anthony Labonte	September 29, 2025	217
61	22	"Rubberiest Rubber Bands"	Written by : Fareid El Gafy	September 30, 2025	224
61	22	"Donuts for Doggies"	Written by : Diana Aydin	September 30, 2025	224
62	23	"Hugs and Misses"	Written by : Utkarsh Rajawat	October 1, 2025	208
62	23	"Adventures in Kid-Sitting"	Written by : Rodney Stringfellow	October 1, 2025	208

=== Season 3 (2026–) ===
No. overall	No. in season	Title	Written by	Original release date	Prod. code
63	1	"Cowboy Howard"	Written by : Rodney Stringfellow; Storyboarded by : Troy Sullivan	January 19, 2026	302
63	1	"Junior's Hair Salon"	Written by : Maria Escobedo; Storyboarded by : Eugene McDermott	January 19, 2026	302
64	2	"Best Food Truck in the Bronx"	Written by : Diana Aydin; Storyboarded by : Anthony Labonte	January 20, 2026	303
64	2	"Howard's Hamburgers"	Written by : Leah Gotcsik; Storyboarded by : Kevin Currie	January 20, 2026	303
65	3	"World's Greatest Playdate"	Written by : Dave Barton Thomas; Storyboarded by : Armando Gomez Alvarez	January 21, 2026	212
65	3	"What Alma Wants"	Written by : JP Meier; Storyboarded by : Ian Jeans	January 21, 2026	212
66	4	"Alma in Oz: The Musical!"	Written by : Jorge Aguirre; Dana Chan; Storyboarded by : Anthony Labonte; Kevin Currie	July 13, 2026	307
67	5	"Light Up the Block"	Written by : Maria Escobedo; Storyboarded by : Ian Jeans	July 14, 2026	218
67	5	"Alma's Shortcuts"	Written by : Isabel Galupo; Storyboarded by : Armando Gomez Alvarez	July 14, 2026	218
68	6	"Library Run"	Written by : Jorge Aguirre; Storyboarded by : Anthony Labonte	September 7, 2026	301
68	6	"The Library of...Things!"	Written by : Dave Barton Thomas; Storyboarded by : Kevin Currie	September 7, 2026	301
69	7	"Baby Junior"	Written by : Rodney Stringfellow; Storyboarded by : Troy Sullivan	September 8, 2026	304
69	7	"Alma the Babysitter"	Written by : Melinda LaRose; Storyboarded by : Eugene McDermott	September 8, 2026	304
70	8	"Alma Gets the Grumps"	Written by : Susan Kim; Storyboarded by : Anthony Labonte	September 9, 2026	305
70	8	"Hoop Hero Junior"	Written by : Diana Aydin; Storyboarded by : Kevin Currie	September 9, 2026	305
