= Corn & Peg =

Canadian animated television series

- Genre: Comedy; Fantasy; Musical; Slice of life
- Directed by: Sean V. Jeffrey
- Voices of: Colin Critchley; Jaiden Cannatelli; Niko Ceci; Shechinah Mpumlwana; Julie Sype; Shayle Simons; Neil Crone; Ava Close; Jackson Reid; Josh Graham
- Theme music composer: Ryan Marshall
- Composers: Stephen Skratt; Asher Lenz
- Country of origin: Canada
- Original language: English
- No. of seasons: 2
- No. of episodes: 40 (79 segments)

Production
- Executive producers: Scott Dyer; Helen Lebeau (season 1); Chris Hamilton; Rick Gitelson (season 1); Pam Westman (season 2)
- Producer: Lynne Warner
- Editor: Brian Karn (online editor)
- Running time: 22 minutes
- Production company: Nelvana

Original release
- Network: Treehouse TV
- Release: February 22, 2019 – October 8, 2020

Corn & Peg is a Canadian animated children's television series produced by Nelvana for the Nick Jr. Channel and Treehouse TV. The series revolves around the titular best friends, a unicorn and pegasus named Corn and Peg respectively, who are dynamic do-gooders striving to make their town, Galloping Grove, a better place. In the United States, a sneak peek of the series aired on Nickelodeon on February 22, 2019, before its official premiere on March 4. It was renewed for a second season in April 2019.

== Plot ==
Corn & Peg follows the adventures of two do-gooders; a blue unicorn called Corn, and a pink Pegasus called Peg. Corn & Peg are best friends, schoolmates, inseparable since preschool, and influenced by their favorite superhero and role model, Captain Thunderhoof. Throughout the series, the two go around their community of Galloping Grove to make it a better place by helping anyone they can.

== Characters ==
=== Main ===
- Corn (voiced by Colin Critchley in the pilot, Jaiden Cannatelli in episodes 1–25 and 27–30, and Niko Ceci in episodes 26 and 31–46) is a blue unicorn with a darker blue mane and tail, and wears a red jacket. He idolizes Captain Thunderhoof and has dedicated his life to doing good deeds for others along with his best friend, Peg. He used to be shy and scared of making friends until he met Peg at a bench while they were in preschool. He can use his horn if there is a need for light, or he can use it to pop or cut things. He can sometimes get goofy and clumsy and has kind of a big appetite, but he is still very loyal and often likes to encourage Peg by branding her as the best at everything that she does.
- Peg (voiced by Shechinah Mpumlwana) is a pink Pegasus with a golden-yellow mane and tail with flowers, and wears a turquoise dress. She's Corn's best friend and is rarely ever seen without him. Like Corn, she also idolizes Captain Thunderhoof and is dedicated to doing good deeds for others. Being a Pegasus, she is capable of flight, but because her wings are so tiny, she can't reach high altitudes and is limited to how much hang time she can have while airborne. She's also pretty strong for a foal her size. Peg loves to laugh at Corn's antics and fortunately doesn't get too annoyed by his goofiness.

=== Recurring ===
- Captain Thunderhoof (voiced by Julie Sype) is a white winged unicorn with a sky blue mane and tail. She is a superhero who stars in a TV show and acts as a role model to both Corn and Peg. Most everyone in Galloping Grove is a huge fan of her. She is mostly summoned when Corn and Peg shine their horn and wings respectively, though they only call her when there is an emergency. Though powerful, her weakness is ice (which causes her superpowers to freeze).
- Ferris (voiced by Shayle Simons) is an orange pony with an orange Afro. Corn and Peg are his closest friends. He loves carrots and Captain Thunderhoof but often doesn't have the best of luck.
- Clarissa (voiced by Ava Close) is a pink pony with a blue mane and wears a blue jacket. She is another friend of Corn and Peg's. She's all about fashion and is the leader of a team of cheer-leading ponies known as the Posies. She's obsessed with Twinkle Piggy and just recently became a big sister to baby Marissa.
  - Paisley, Praxton & Prue (The Posies) (voiced by Gabby Clarke, Isis Moore and Matilda Simons) are Clarissa's three best friends, a clique and not to be confused with the American rock band of the same name.
- Ferdy (voiced by Jackson Reid) is Ferris' little brother. He loves Corn and Peg but often gets into mischief. Because of his young age, his vocabulary is a little flawed.
- Mayor Montagu (voiced by Neil Crone) is the mayor of Galloping Grove. He's a tan horse with a brown mustache who wears a dark blue suit and top hat as well as spectacles. He does his best to make sure Galloping Grove is at its best. When Corn and Peg meet him, they treat him with the salutation, "How do, Mayor Montagu?"
- Farmer Shire (voiced by Katie Griffin) is Galloping Grove's farmer. She often has trouble keeping her animals under control and often asks Corn and Peg to help her with that.
- Todd (voiced by Josh Graham) is a friend of the main characters that runs a comic store. Though he tends to run out of things very quickly much to Corn and Peg's dismay.
- Miss Sassy (voiced by Stacey DePass) is a horse who runs a garment store. She wears high-heels on all fours.
- Carrier Pintock (voiced by Paloma Nuñez) is Galloping Grove's mail-delivery horse.
- Penny Pintock (voiced by Bryn McAuley) is Carrier Pintock's best friend and sister who lives in Trottingham.
- Pippa (voiced by Elana Dunkelman) is a pilot who takes Corn and Peg to places outside of Galloping Grove.
- Chef Rigatoni (voiced by Mac Heywood) is a professional chef whom Peg idolizes.
- Sheriff Swiftstone (voiced by Doug Murray) is a police officer whose job is to make sure Galloping Grove is all under control and all of the residents are obeying the law.
- Ferris and Ferdy's Parents
- Captain Bluehoof is the founder of Galloping Grove.
- Stella (voiced by Jessica Liadsky) is a salon stylist who owns her own store called Stella's Salon and has a baby child.
- Miss Rider (voiced by Athena Karkanis) is a teacher at Featherhorn Elementary.
- Slater (voiced by Aidan Wojtak-Hissong in season 1 and Callum Shoniker in season 2) is a lonesome foal who just wants friends to play with, which Corn and Peg give support to.
- Viv (voiced by Alanna Bale) is Eddie's cousin who wants to watch her cousin in the race.
- Eddie (voiced by Mac Heywood) is a racehorse who is Viv's cousin.
- Miss Biscuit (voiced by Elizabeth Hanna)
- The Hoofersons (voiced by Helen King, Chris Jabot and Mia SwamiNatahan) are the family that live right next door to Peg.
- Dolly (voiced by Elley-Ray Hennesey) is Featherhorn Elementary's lunch horse.
- Commander Hayfield (voiced by Peter Cugno) is an astronaut who, with Corn and Peg, help Ferris try to become an astronaut like him.
- Handyhoof Hal (voiced by Joseph Motiki)
- Ooompah Band is the town's band.
- Dr Trotski (voiced by Brandi Marie Ward) is the doctor of Galloping Grove.
- Paolo (voiced by Christian Distefano) is a friend Corn and Peg meet at school who has a talent for beat-boxing.
- Coach Clydesdale (voiced by Zachary Bennett) is a brown horse who trains younger foals on sports and other activities.
- Jordy (voiced by Chloe Bryer) is a young foal who has a dream of being a trailblazer like Corn and Peg, but she has a short attention span and tends to make disasters out of almost everything that she does.
- Fire Chief Helen (voiced by Nicki Burke) is the head of Galloping Grove's fire department.
- Tugboat Ted (voiced by Jamie Watson) is the captain of his own ship and once see the sea stallion named Stanley.
- Tuck is Skip's pet dog and co-ski patrol rescuer.
- Mr Mule (voiced by Neil Foster)
- Ruby McDougal (voiced by Hattie Kragten) is the star player of the Featherhorn Flyers, her secret weapon of the game is backwards.
- Trent Trotter (voiced by Dan Petronijevic) is an Action News report for Galloping Grove Action News.
- Prancelot, Clyde, Giddy-Up and Frolic (The Backsteed Boys) (voiced by Cory Doran, Danny Smith, Deven Mack and Anthony Sardinha) are a boy band that everyone in Galloping Grove is a fan, especially Corn and Peg. They are a parody of the Backstreet Boys.
- Mayor Stable is the mayor of Hoofing Hills.
- Pilot Pete (voiced by A.C. Peterson) is a retired pilot.
- Teddy Tumbleweed (voiced by Andrew Jackson) is a cowboy who helps Corn and Peg how to become cowboys just like him.
- Sage, Chip & Danny (voiced by Makenna Beatty, Lukas Engel and Leo Orgil) are Ruby teammates of the Featherhorn Flyers.
- Skip (voiced by Aris Athanasopoulos) is a ski-patroller and always helps anybody who is in danger of the slopes.
- The Hoofington Hoofers are the arch rivals of the Featherhorn Flyers at Trotterball from Hoofing Hills.
- Principal Golding (voiced by Jeffrey Knight) is the principal of Featherhorn Elementary.
- Joey (voiced by Keegan Hedley) is a student at Featherhorn and best friend of Charlie.
- Charlie (voiced by Benjamin Hum) is the newest student at Featherhorn.
- Chris is a student at Featherhorn Elementary.
- Hoofenstein (voiced by Ron Pardo)
- Mr. Nickerson (voiced by Ron Pardo)
- Orius (voiced by Adrian Truss) is an omniscient wizard who is Captain Thunderhoof's friend.
- Megafrost (voiced by Brad Adamson)
- Thundarians
- Scientist Judy
- Grandmare (voiced by Julie Lemieux)
- Pappy is also a student at Featherhorn Elementary, and also a minor character.

== Production ==
Corn & Peg was produced by Nelvana in Canada. Storyboard services were provided by Oddbot Animation for season 1, and Pipeline Studios handled the animation for season 2. Development for the show began in the spring of 2014. On April 5, 2019, it was announced that it was renewed for a second season.

== Episodes ==
=== Series overview ===
Season	Episodes	Segments	Originally released	
Season	Episodes	Segments	First released	Last released
1	20	40	February 22, 2019	February 19, 2020
2	20	39	February 20, 2020	October 8, 2020

=== Season 1 (2019–20) ===
The first season contained twenty 22-minute episodes.

No.	Title	Written by	Storyboard by	Original air date Canadian air date		Prod. code	Canada viewers (millions)
1	"A Very Sticker Situation"	Anthony Artibello, Sheila Dinsmore, Francisco Paredes, and Maxwell Beaudry	Waymond Singleton, Shannon Eric Denton, and Katy Shuttleworth	February 22, 2019	March 31, 2019	102	0.66
1	"When Life Gives You Apples"	Barbara Haynes	Waymond Singleton, Shannon Eric Denton, and Katy Shuttleworth	February 22, 2019	March 31, 2019	102	0.66
"A Very Sticker Situation": While Corn and Peg rush to the comic store to get Captain Thunderhoof stickers, they keep stopping to do-good for others. Songs: Do Good Song "When Life Gives You Apples": Corn and Peg have to figure out what to do with the extra baskets of leftover apples before they go bad. Songs: Do Good Song, Apples
2	"Deputy Do Gooders"	Maxwell Beaudry and Francisco Paredes	Shellie Kvilvang, Kiernan Sjursen-Lien, Waymond Singleton, and Katy Shuttleworth	March 4, 2019	March 16, 2019	108	0.66
2	"Horse Play"	Maxwell Beaudry and Francisco Paredes	Shellie Kvilvang, Kiernan Sjursen-Lien, Waymond Singleton, and Katy Shuttleworth	March 4, 2019	March 16, 2019	108	0.66
"Deputy Do Gooders": Sheriff Swiftstone makes Corn and Peg deputies, but they get distracted from their traffic duties. Songs: Do Good Song "Horse Play": While Captain Thunderhoof is busy stopping a boulder from rolling towards Farmer Shire's farm, Corn and Peg help with a rescue. Songs: Do Good Song
3	"Carrot Club"	Jorge Aguirre	Grace Kraft, Jojo Baptista, Waymond Singleton, and Katy Shuttleworth	March 5, 2019	March 17, 2019	103	0.57
3	"Mayor Montagu's Party"	Richard Gitelson	Grace Kraft, Jojo Baptista, Waymond Singleton, and Katy Shuttleworth	March 5, 2019	March 17, 2019	103	0.57
"Carrot Club": Corn and Peg start a carrot club, but when Ferris doesn't meet the requirements to join, they search the town for him. Songs: Do Good Song "Mayor Montagu's Party": Corn and Peg plan a party for Mayor Montagu in order to prevent him from moving away. Songs: Do Good Song, Mixing Colors
4	"Firefighter Peg"	Elly Kramer and Laura Brown	Shellie Kvilvang, Waymond Singleton, Jina Noh, and Katy Shuttleworth	March 6, 2019	March 24, 2019	110	0.48
4	"Adventures in Horsesitting"	Charles Johnston	Shellie Kvilvang, Waymond Singleton, Jina Noh, and Katy Shuttleworth	March 6, 2019	March 24, 2019	110	0.48
"Firefighter Peg": When Peg rescues a baby pig, she becomes the firefighter she's always wanted to be. Songs: Do Good Song "Adventures in Horsesitting": Corn and Peg help babysit their neighbor's foals while their parents pack for moving day. Song: Do Good Song
5	"Lemonhay is for Horses"	Charles Johnston	Shellie Kvilvang, Waymond Singleton, Kiernan Sjursen-Lien, and Katy Shuttleworth	March 11, 2019	April 7, 2019	106	0.51
5	"Hidden Talents"	Barbara Haynes	Shellie Kvilvang, Waymond Singleton, Kiernan Sjursen-Lien, and Katy Shuttleworth	March 11, 2019	April 7, 2019	106	0.51
"Lemonhay is for Horses": Corn and Peg start a lemon hay stand in order to raise money for a Movie Night in Galloping Grove. Songs: Do Good Song "Hidden Talents": Corn and Peg help Paolo fulfill his dream of performing with the Posies during Featherhorn Elementary's talent show. Song: Do Good Song
6	"Bownanza"	Katherine Sanford	Grace Kraft, Jojo Baptista, and Katy Shuttleworth	March 12, 2019	April 14, 2019	101	0.63
6	"On the Ball"	Sheila Dinsmore	Grace Kraft, Jojo Baptista, and Katy Shuttleworth	March 12, 2019	April 14, 2019	101	0.63
"Bownanza": Corn and Peg organize Miss Sassy's bow shop. Songs: Do Good Song, Sorting Bows "On the Ball": Corn and Peg help look for the owner of a ball. Songs: Do Good Song
7	"Carrot on the Loose"	Shelley Hoffmann & Robert Pincombe	Jojo Baptista, Grace Kraft, Kiernan Sjursen-Lien, and Katy Shuttleworth	March 13, 2019	April 21, 2019	107	0.70
7	"Derby Day"	Barbara Haynes	Jojo Baptista, Grace Kraft, Kiernan Sjursen-Lien, and Katy Shuttleworth	March 13, 2019	April 21, 2019	107	0.70
"Carrot on the Loose": When a giant carrot rolls away, Corn and Peg find a delicious way to save Carrot Day. Songs: Measure First, Do Good Song "Derby Day": Viv stands out at a derby with help from Corn & Peg because of who she is, not what she looks like. Songs Do Good Song, Stella's Salon Song Special Guest Star: Alanna Bale as Viv
8	"Snow Storm"	Anthony Artibello and Sheila Dinsmore	Shellie Kvilvang, Waymond Singleton, Kiernan Sjursen-Lien, and Katy Shuttleworth	March 14, 2019	April 28, 2019	104	0.66
8	"Clarissa's Jacket"	Laurie Elliot	Shellie Kvilvang, Waymond Singleton, Kiernan Sjursen-Lien, and Katy Shuttleworth	March 14, 2019	April 28, 2019	104	0.66
"Snow Storm": Corn and Peg rescue Carrier Pintock when a snowstorm hits town, and help her deliver the mail. Songs: Do Good Song "Clarissa's Jacket": Corn and Peg play detectives in order to help Clarissa find her missing Twinkle Piggy jacket. Songs: Do Good Song, Twinkle Piggy, Clarissa's Jacket
9	"Bubble Storm"	Barbara Haynes	Grace Kraft, Jojo Baptista, and Katy Shuttleworth	April 1, 2019	May 5, 2019	111A	0.56
When soap from a bubble blower pours into a fountain, bubbles spread all over town. Songs: Do Good Song
10	"Comic Catastrophe"	Maxwell Beaudry and Francisco Paredes	Grace Kraft, Jojo Baptista, and Katy Shuttleworth	April 2, 2019	May 5, 2019	111B	0.54
Ferris' comic book gets covered in mud. To help him, Corn and Peg draw a comic. Songs: Do Good Song
11	"A Bad Case of the Neigh Choos"	Elly Kramer and Laura Brown	Waymond Singleton, Jina Noh, Jojo Baptista, and Katy Shuttleworth	April 3, 2019	May 19, 2019	112A	0.43
A lot of horses have caught the Neigh Choos. Corn and Peg, who are not affected, head to a mountain to obtain special healing leaves. Songs: Do Good Song
12	"Power Outage"	Kevin Monk	Waymond Singleton, Jina Noh, Jojo Baptista, and Katy Shuttleworth	April 4, 2019	May 19, 2019	112B	0.47
Fun time at the fair gets interrupted when the electricity goes out. Songs: Do Good Song
13	"The Great Earth Day Gallop"	Patrick Granleese	Grace Kraft, Jojo Baptista, and Kiernan Sjursen-Lien	April 22, 2019	May 12, 2019	105A	0.57
Corn, Peg, and various horses enter a marathon to celebrate Earth Day. Songs: Do Good Song
14	"Horse Blankets"	Patrick Granleese	Grace Kraft, Jojo Baptista, and Kiernan Sjursen-Lien	April 23, 2019	May 12, 2019	105B	0.48
Corn and Peg search for the lost blanket of Ms. Biscuit. Songs: Do Good Song
15	"The Hoofing Hills Flyer"	Patrick Granleese	Grace Kraft, Kiara Zhao, and Katy Shuttleworth	April 24, 2019	May 26, 2019	113A	0.60
A train engineer turns an old steam locomotive into a public display at a station to make way for a newer and faster train. Songs: Do Good Song, Steam Engine Song
16	"If the Shoe Fits"	Barbara Haynes	Grace Kraft, Kiara Zhao, and Katy Shuttleworth	April 25, 2019	May 26, 2019	113B	0.54
Ferdy's shoes are too small and therefore make him awkward, but he is reluctant to replace them. Songs: Do Good Song
17	"Let's Go Fly a Corn"	Tom Berger	Waymond Singleton, Jojo Baptista, and Katy Shuttleworth	May 31, 2019	September 7, 2019	114	0.65
17	"Cattle Drive"	Charles Johnston	Waymond Singleton, Jojo Baptista, and Katy Shuttleworth	May 31, 2019	September 7, 2019	114	0.65
"Let's Go Fly a Corn": After Peg uses her wings to stop a kite catastrophe, Corn asks Peg to teach him how to fly. Songs: Do Good Song "Cattle Drive": Corn and Peg help Cowboy Teddy Tumbleweed when he takes Farmer Shire's cows on a cattle drive to a yummy Lemonhay field. Song: Do Good Song, Whoppie Ti Yi Yo
18	"Buddy Bench"	Maxwell Beaudry and Francisco Paredes	Grace Kraft, Kiara Zhao, Jina Noh, and Katy Shuttleworth	September 7, 2019	TBA	115	0.45
18	"To Taste or Not to Taste"	Jennifer Daley	Grace Kraft, Kiara Zhao, Jina Noh, and Katy Shuttleworth	September 7, 2019	TBA	115	0.45
"Buddy Bench": Corn and Peg help a shy horse make friends. Songs: Do Good Song, Everyone Needs a Buddy Special Guest Star: Athena Karkanis of NBC's Manifest as Miss Rider "To Taste or Not to Taste": Dolly, the school cafeteria horse starts to serve pizza, a dish never-before-seen at school. Will the customers like the new dish? Songs: Do Good Song, Pizza Song Note: The first segment of the episode reveals how Corn & Peg became best friends.
19	"The Haunted Barn"	Charles Johnston	Grace Kraft, Jojo Baptista, Kiernan Sjursen-Lien and Katy Shuttleworth	October 5, 2019	TBA	109	0.52
19	"Trailblazers"	Tom Berger	Grace Kraft, Jojo Baptista, Kiernan Sjursen-Lien and Katy Shuttleworth	October 5, 2019	TBA	109	0.52
"The Haunted Barn": A Horseoween fun house in Farmer Shire's barn helps Corn, Peg, and Clarissa face their fears. Songs: Do Good Song "Trailblazers": Trailblazer Troop members Corn and Peg help new recruit Jordy earn her teamwork badge. Songs: Do Good Song
20	"Parade Problems"	Diana Moore	Jojo Baptista, Jina Noh, Waymond Singleton, and Katy Shuttleworth	November 2, 2019	TBA	116	0.25
20	"Do-Good Stand"	Ethan Banville	Jojo Baptista, Jina Noh, Waymond Singleton, and Katy Shuttleworth	November 2, 2019	TBA	116	0.25
"Parade Problems": Corn injures his leg which prevents him from attending the parade. Peg, Ferris, and Ferdy try to cheer him up somehow. Songs: Do Good Song Note: Ferris and Ferdy joined Peg to sing the Do Good Song, due to Corn having a twisted hoof. "Do-Good Stand": Corn and Peg are fond of helping their neighbors, thus they put up a stand to promote their cause. Songs: Do Good Song
21	"Living on the Ledge"	Tom Berger	Katy Shuttleworth and Jina Noh	November 30, 2019	TBA	117	0.31
21	"The Sea Stallion"	Laurie Elliot	Katy Shuttleworth and Jina Noh	November 30, 2019	TBA	117	0.31
"Living on the Ledge": Corn and Peg join Junior Ski Patrols and learn an important lesson about paying attention to safety on the slopes. Songs: Do Good Song "The Sea Stallion": Corn and Peg's boat cruise turns into a rescue clean up mission when they find a seahorse trapped in trash in the ocean. Songs: Do Good Song, We Care About Our World
22	"Backsteed Boys"	Maxwell Beaudry and Francisco Paredes	Grace Kraft, Katy Shuttleworth, Jojo Baptista, and Jina Noh	December 14, 2019	TBA	118	0.31
22	"Trotterball"	Josh Gal	Grace Kraft, Katy Shuttleworth, Jojo Baptista, and Jina Noh	December 14, 2019	TBA	118	0.31
"Backsteed Boys": Corn and Peg help their favorite band, the Backsteed Boys, out of a jam when their bus breaks down in the middle of nowhere. Songs: Do Good Song, Pump It Up, Sugar Cube Special Guest Star: Danny Smith as Clyde "Trotterball": Corn and Peg help Ruby practice trotterball so she can feel more confident on the field and help her team win the big game. Songs: Do Good Song Note: This episode is dedicated to the memory of Skye Wiene (one of the storyboard artists at OddBot who worked on the show), who died in a traffic collison on December 9, 2019, five days before this episode aired.
23	"Clarissa's New Look"	Patrick Granleese	Waymond Singleton and Katy Shuttleworth	February 18, 2020	TBA	119	0.32
23	"Carrot Clubhouse"	Story by : Jason Hopley; Teleplay by : Jennifer Daley	Waymond Singleton and Katy Shuttleworth	February 18, 2020	TBA	119	0.32
"Clarissa's New Look": Clarissa misses badly at a carnival game she used to be very good at Songs: Do-Good Song "Carrot Clubhouse": A beaver destroys Corn and Peg's clubhouse, making the two do-gooders and their friends look for a new one. Songs: Do-Good song
24	"A Good Cause"	Tom Berger	Waymond Singleton, Jojo Baptista, and Katy Shuttleworth	February 19, 2020	TBA	120	0.33
24	"Shoot for the Moon"	Patrick Granleese	Waymond Singleton, Jojo Baptista, and Katy Shuttleworth	February 19, 2020	TBA	120	0.33
"A Good Cause": Corn and Peg help a bird sanctuary and find out that donations don't have to be about money. Songs: Do Good Song "Shoot for the Moon": Corn and Peg help Ferris live out his dream of landing on the Moon at the Galloping Grove Space Center. Songs: Do Good Song

=== Season 2 (2020) ===
No. overall	No. in season	Title	Written by	U.S. air date	Prod. code	U.S. viewers (millions)
25	1	"Dinosaur Do-Good"	Anthony Artibello & Sheila Rogerson	February 20, 2020	201	0.33
25	1	"The Legend of Bighoof"	Anthony Artibello & Sheila Rogerson	February 20, 2020	201	0.33
"Dinosaur Do-Good": Corn, Peg, and their friends have a sleepover at a dinosaur museum in order to help a little dinosaur. Songs: Do-Good Song "The Legend of Bighoof": Corn, Peg, and their fellow trailblazers explore a forest where a mysterious horse lurks. Songs: Do-Good Song
26	2	"Friendship Day"	Anthony Artibello & Sheila Rogerson	February 21, 2020	203	0.32
26	2	"Cowboy Canyon"	Anthony Artibello & Sheila Rogerson	February 21, 2020	203	0.32
"Friendship Day": Carrier Pintock wishes she could celebrate Friendship Day with her sister Penny, who lives in Trottingham, so Corn and Peg travel there to find her and reunite them. Songs: Do-Good Song "Cowboy Canyon": Corn and Peg help Clarissa find her Twinkle Piggy phone which falls into the bottom of Cowboy Canyon. Songs: Do-Good Song Notes: This is the first episode where Niko Ceci plays Corn in the series.
27	3	"Lost in the Frost"	Tom Berger	July 6, 2020	204	0.32
27	3	"An Eggcellent Adventure"	Jennifer Daley	July 6, 2020	204	0.32
"Lost in the Frost": Someone lost a stuffed animal in the snow, thus Corn and Peg search for its owner. Songs: Do-Good Song "An Eggcellent Adventure": Corn and Peg help Farmer Shire by watching over her duck that has eggs that are about to hatch. Songs: Do The Waddley Waddle Song, Do-Good Song Notes: Jaiden Cannatelli returns as the voice of Corn.
28	4	"Beached Day"	Anthony Artibello & Sheila Rogerson	July 7, 2020	205	0.32
28	4	"Welcome Baby Marissa"	Elly Kramer & Laura Brown	July 7, 2020	205	0.32
"Beached Day": It is Ferris' first time at the beach, and Corn and Peg want him to have the best experience there. Songs: Do-Good Song "Welcome Baby Marissa": Clarissa's younger sister is born, thus she sees it as a special day. But she starts to feel insignificant when her friends offer gifts to the filly but none for her. Songs: Do-Good Song, Baby Marissa Rap Song
29	5	"Galloping Ghost"	Anthony Artibello & Sheila Rogerson	July 8, 2020	206	0.37
29	5	"Bluehoof's Treasure"	Anthony Artibello & Sheila Rogerson	July 8, 2020	206	0.37
"Galloping Ghost": Ferdy walks in his sleep and under a blanket, thus Corn, Peg, and Ferris think he is a ghost. Songs: Do-Good Song "Bluehoof's Treasure": Corn, Peg, and Ferris search for a lost pirate ship. Songs: Do-Good Song, Pirate Shanty Song
30	6	"Trick or Squeak"	Charles Johnston	July 9, 2020	202	0.27
30	6	"Mayors for a Day"	Maxwell Beaudry & Francisco Paredes	July 9, 2020	202	0.27
"Trick or Squeak": Corn and Peg befriend a bat, and want to have it as a pet. Songs: Do-Good Song "Mayors for a Day": Corn and Peg are elected substitute mayors of Galloping Grove. Songs: Do-Good Song, Mayor for the Day Song
31	7	"Trot Together"	Tom Berger	July 27, 2020	207	0.38
31	7	"Do Good Hotline"	Phil McCordic	July 27, 2020	207	0.38
"Trot Together": After releasing a good music video, Clarissa and the Posies decide to dissolve over disagreement on how to make their next. Songs: Do-Good Song "Do Good Hotline": Corn and Peg put a service where citizens who need assistance can call for them. Songs: Do-Good Song Notes: Niko Ceci returns to voice Corn permanently.
32	8	"Catch a Code"	Phil McCordic, Maxwell Beaudry and Francisco Paredes	July 28, 2020	208	0.35
32	8	"Stripe Hype"	Elly Kramer & Laura Brown	July 28, 2020	208	0.35
"Catch a Code": Ferris wants to win the science fair, but his invention, a cleaning robot, goes wonky across town. Songs: Do-Good Song "Stripe Hype": A new neighbor moves into Galloping Grove, and Corn and Peg want to give him a special welcome. Songs: Do-Good Song
33	9	"Forever Home"	Story by : Terry Lenko; Teleplay by : Patrick Granleese	July 29, 2020	209	0.27
33	9	"Broken Telephone"	Amanda Smith	July 29, 2020	209	0.27
"Forever Home": Corn and Peg help a veterinarian get permanent places for her animals. Songs: Do-Good Song Special Guest Star: Lisa Berry as Mrs. Tenderhoof "Broken Telephone": Because telephone transmissions are down, Corn and Peg decide to help Miss Sassy by personally hearing the orders of her customers, and forwarding them to her. Songs: Do-Good Song
34	10	"Hot Hooves"	Tom Berger	July 30, 2020	211	0.26
34	10	"Corn Fest"	Patrick Granleese	July 30, 2020	211	0.26
"Hot Hooves": Corn and Peg must figure how to keep themselves and the other attendants of an outdoor party cool on a hot summer's day. Songs: Do-Good Song "Corn Fest": Corn and Peg help Farmer Shire keep crows away from her cornfield. Songs: Do-Good Song
35	11	"Saddle Up Sidekicks"	Anthony Artibello & Sheila Rogerson	August 3, 2020	212	0.33
A villainous horse is freezing all of Captain Thunderhoof's home world. Captain Thunderhoof takes Corn and Peg to be her comrades for the mission. Songs: Do-Good Song, Megafrost Taunt Song
36	12	"Hooked on Comics"	Jeff Sager	August 4, 2020	213	0.30
36	12	"Badge of Appreciation"	Michael Olmo	August 4, 2020	213	0.30
"Hooked on Comics": Corn and Peg decide to help Todd by watching his book store so Todd can attend a comic convention. Songs: Do-Good Song "Badge of Appreciation": Corn, Peg, and various friends want to give Sheriff Swiftstone gifts to thank him for his public service. Songs: Do-Good Song
37	13	"Hoofsgiving"	Anthony Artibello & Sheila Rogerson	August 5, 2020	210	0.32
37	13	"Capture the Carrot"	J.D. Smith	August 5, 2020	210	0.32
"Hoofsgiving": A thick cloud rolls over Galloping Grove, making it hard for seafarers to reach the docks. Songs: Do-Good Song "Capture the Carrot": Corn, Peg, Ferris, and Ferdy team up in a contest of finding a golden carrot hidden in the woods. Their opponents are Clarissa and the Posies, who won the last three seasons of the contest. Songs: Do-Good Song
38	14	"Happy Hoofmas"	Maxwell Beaudry & Francisco Paredes	August 6, 2020	216	0.31
38	14	"Snow Service"	Amanda Smith	August 6, 2020	216	0.31
"Happy Hoofmas": When Horsie Claus (the show's version of Santa Claus) drops his sack of gifts, Corn and Peg decide to help by delivering them. Songs: Do-Good Song "Snow Service": Corn and Peg remove some snow in their neighborhood so they can come to the skating rink. Songs: Do-Good Song
39	15	"Game Interrupted"	Patrick Granleese	August 10, 2020	TBA	0.37
Corn, Peg, and their friends are going to a playground to play a ball game. But to their disappointment, the play area is flooded. Songs: Do-Good Song
40	16	"Miss Sassy's Musical"	Amanda Smith	August 11, 2020	TBA	0.27
Slater, who was to play the Big Bad Wolf in a play of The Three Little Pigs, has to give up his role after his voice was affected by a cold. Corn and Peg audition various horses for his replacement. Songs: Do-Good Song
41	17	"Pedal Power"	Patrick Granleese	August 12, 2020	TBA	0.27
Because his little bike is too slow, Ferdy decides to go for a slightly larger one even if it requires some familiarity. Songs: Do-Good Song
42	18	"Super Do-Gooder"	Kevin Bjerkness, Anthony Artibello and Sheila Rogerson	August 13, 2020	TBA	0.29
Ferdy joins Corn and Peg in helping horses in the neighborhood. It goes well until Ferdy starts trying to do good deeds alone which unintentionally causes problems. Songs: Do-Good Song
43	19	"Homesick Hotel"	Jason Hopley, Maxwell Beaudry and Francisco Paredes	October 5, 2020	217	0.23
43	19	"Camp Wanna Trotta"	Jacqueline Burke	October 5, 2020	217	0.23
"Homesick Hotel": Corn and Peg, who are bellhops at a hotel, try to cheer up a pony who is glum about her visit. Songs: Do-Good Song, Hoofchester Hotel Song "Camp Wanna Trotta": Clarissa is excited to try the swimming pool at the camp, but she retreats upon finding its depth exceeds her height. Songs: Do-Good Song, Camp Wanna Trotta Song
44	20	"Lights, Camera, Gallop"	Ethan Banville	October 6, 2020	218	0.29
44	20	"Bouncy Knights"	Michael Olmo	October 6, 2020	218	0.29
"Lights, Camera, Gallop": Corn and Peg help Mayor Montague take a video of Galloping Grove and its services. Songs: Do-Good Song "Bouncy Knights": A bouncy house at a festival is ruptured, thus Corn and Peg need to obtain the tools to fix it. Songs: Do-Good Song
45	21	"Comic Mystery"	Patrick Granleese	October 7, 2020	219	0.20
45	21	"A Trailblazer Birthday"	Philippa Marvin	October 7, 2020	219	0.20
"Comic Mystery": At the comic book store, a package that contained the new comics is empty, thus Corn and Peg search for whoever took the books. Songs: Do-Good Song "A Trailblazers Birthday": A new trailblazer is celebrating his birthday at the trip. The coach assigns Corn and Peg to show the birthday celebrant around in the woods while the rest secretly set up the party. Songs: Do-Good Song
46	22	"Karate Corn"	Patrick Granleese	October 8, 2020	220	0.20
46	22	"Together Apart"	Ghia Godfree	October 8, 2020	220	0.20
"Karate Corn": Corn is a karate student who tries to break a wooden plank with his bare hoof but fails, thus his instructor helps by assigning him to less intuitive but effective methods. Songs: Do-Good Song "Together Apart": Corn and Peg are arranged to take separate classes at school which is hard for them as they are not accustom to not going out together.

== Broadcast ==
Corn & Peg was first broadcast on Nickelodeon in the United States, as a sneak peek premiere of the second episode aired on February 22, 2019. The series premiered on March 4 on the main network, as the series simultaneously airs on its sister channel, the Nick Jr. Channel. The series also broadcast on Treehouse TV in Canada on March 16. The series was also broadcast in the UK and Australia.

Following the series' U.S. launch, it was broadcast internationally on other Nickelodeon channels in 2019 and 2020.

== Awards and nominations ==
In 2021, Treehouse TV and Nelvana received a Canadian Screen Award nomination for the show.

== Merchandise ==
Random House published books based on the show. The first 2 books, Do-Gooders Unite and The Green Team were released on January 7, 2020. The next 3 books, a coloring book, a Golden Book entitled Time To Be Kind, and a picture book entitled Bubble Trouble, were released on July 7, 2020, and are published by Penguin Random House.
