= Jelly, Ben & Pogo =

- Genre: Adventure; Fantasy
- Created by: Jalysa Leva
- Directed by: Jalysa Leva
- Voices of: Vanille Velasquez; Jalysa Leva; Christina Sivrich; Diadem Faith; Aife; Bryan Encarnacion; Eli Banks; Sara Burmenko
- Country of origin: United States
- Original languages: English; Tagalog
- No. of episodes: 20

Production
- Running time: 3 minutes
- Production company: Primal Screen

Original release
- Network: PBS Kids
- Release: October 4, 2021 – January 7, 2022

Jelly, Ben & Pogo is an animated shorts series created and directed by Filipina-American artist Jalysa Leva. It was animated and produced by the Atlanta-based animation studio Primal Screen. The series premiered on PBS Kids on October 4, 2021, following episodes of Alma's Way.

The series follows the adventures of two Filipino-American siblings, Jelly and her younger brother Ben, with their best friend Pogo, a sea monster. Each three-minute episode incorporates Filipino culture, traditions, food, and language as Jelly, Ben, and Pogo work together to solve problems using empathy and creativity. Geared toward 4-6 year-olds, each episode presents a problem and emphasizes social-emotional learning and design thinking as the three friends collaborate to find a solution.

== Premise ==
Jelly and Ben are Filipino-American siblings living in a multigenerational household with their parents and grandmother. Their best friend Pogo, a sea monster who lives underwater, often visits them on land, though sometimes they visit Pogo at her home under the sea. The trio of friends play and learn together while experiencing Filipino culture. When they encounter a problem they must solve, they say, "Let's make it super-duper!" Once they have a discovered a solution, they sign off on their work with sticker that shows all three of their faces.

== Characters ==
- Jelly (voiced by Vanille Velasquez) is a Filipina-American girl and Ben's older sister. She often takes the lead. She is 8 years old, and is thoughtful, organized, and responsible.
- Ben (voiced by Jalysa Leva) is a Filipino-American boy and Jelly's younger brother. He is 5 years old. He is curious and likes to build. He is often shy, sensitive, and careful.
- Pogo (voiced by Christina Sivrich) is a fun-loving ogopogo-like sea monster eager to learn about life on land. She is playful and outgoing, but sometimes stresses, like when she can't find her special tail sock or decide what to pack for a trip.
- Lola (voiced by Diadem Faith and Aife) is Jelly and Ben's grandmother from the Philippines. She is kind and loving. She sometimes joins the trio in their adventures and teaches them about Filipino traditions.
- Mom (voiced by Diadem Faith and Aife) is Jelly and Ben's mother.
- Dad (voiced by Bryan Encarnacion) is Jelly and Ben's mild-mannered father.
- Mrs. Ogo (voiced by Sara Burmenko) is Pogo's mother.
- Mr. Ogo (voiced by Eli Banks) is Pogo's boisterous father.

== Reception ==
Jelly, Ben & Pogo has been praised for its humor and charm, as well as its authentic portrayal of Filipino culture. It has been especially well-received by the Filipino American community which is often under-represented in American media even when Asians are portrayed. When the show first aired, Jelly, Ben & Pogo gained rapid popularity on the social media platform TikTok.

=== Awards and nominations ===
Year	Award	Category	Result	Ref.
2022	The Telly Awards	General - Cultural & Lifestyle	Won - Silver Telly	
2022	The Telly Awards	General - Children	Won - Silver Telly	
2022	The Telly Awards	General - D&I	Won - Silver Telly	
2023	The Webby Awards	Video & Film	Nominated	
2023	The Webby Awards	Kids & Family	Nominated	

== Episodes ==
No. overall	No. in season	Title	Directed by	Original release date
1	1	"Room to Go"	Jalysa Leva	October 4, 2021
Pogo needs help from her friends Jelly and Ben to pack for a family trip.
2	2	"Lola's Snack"	Jalysa Leva	October 4, 2021
Jelly, Ben, and Pogo decide to make Lola a snack: a Filipino dessert called halo-halo.
3	3	"Best Lizard"	Jalysa Leva	October 4, 2021
Jelly, Ben, and Pogo find a lizard and decide to build it a home.
4	4	"Ben's Birthday"	Jalysa Leva	October 4, 2021
Jelly and Pogo celebrate Ben's birthday...quietly.
5	5	"Pogo's Nose Rocks"	Jalysa Leva	October 4, 2021
Jelly and Ben find a way to display Pogo's collection of nose rocks so they don't break.
6	6	"Tumbang Preso!"	Jalysa Leva	October 4, 2021
Jelly, Ben, and Pogo play a traditional Filipino game, but when it's Jelly's turn to be the guard, she's afraid she'll get hurt.
7	7	"Tail Sock"	Jalysa Leva	October 4, 2021
Jelly and Ben help Pogo find her special tail sock.
8	8	"Ben's Burger Stand"	Jalysa Leva	October 4, 2021
Jelly and Pogo help re-rebuild Ben's burger stand after they accidentally knock it down while sledding.
9	9	"Kamayan"	Jalysa Leva	October 4, 2021
Pogo and her parents come over for a traditional Filipino dinner called kamayan at Jelly and Ben's house.
10	10	"Visiting Lolo"	Jalysa Leva	October 4, 2021
Jelly, Ben, and Pogo go the cemetery on All Soul's Day to visit the plot where Jelly and Ben's grandfather Lolo is buried.
11	11	"Rocks and Sand"	Jalysa Leva	October 18, 2021
Jelly and Pogo are playing "queens", but their castles keep falling down. Ben helps them to build a castle that will stay up.
12	12	"Floataway Squee"	Jalysa Leva	October 25, 2021
Jelly, Ben, and Pogo are playing at the beach when Pogo's toy seal floats away.
13	13	"Sleepover at Pogo's"	Jalysa Leva	October 26, 2021
Jelly and Ben go to Pogo's house for a sleepover. Pogo has thought of everything to make it special and fun...except she forgot to make a place for them all to sleep.
14	14	"Daddy's Trumpo"	Jalysa Leva	January 7, 2022
When Dad's Filipino top trumpo breaks, Jelly, Ben, and Pogo repair it for him.
15	15	"Picture Day"	Jalysa Leva	January 7, 2022
Jelly, Ben, and Pogo want to take a picture together, but they can't agree on a theme.
16	16	"Balikbayan Box"	Jalysa Leva	January 7, 2022
Jelly, Ben, and Pogo help Lola pack a box of goodies for their relatives in the Philippines.
17	17	"Ben Steps Up"	Jalysa Leva	January 7, 2022
Ben wants to help Lola make pichi-pichi, but he's too short to reach the counter. Jelly and Pogo help make a step-stool so he can reach.
18	18	"Snow Monster"	Jalysa Leva	January 7, 2022
Pogo and Ben help Jelly build a snow monster when she's having trouble thinking of ideas.
19	19	"Salamat Po"	Jalysa Leva	January 7, 2022
Lola comes home from a visit to the Philippines with gifts for everyone. Jelly, Ben, and Pogo decide to send a thank you card in the form of a life-size Pogo.
20	20	"Say It With a Song"	Jalysa Leva	January 7, 2022
Ben is sad because something embarrassing happened at school. Jelly and Pogo help him to express his feelings through song.

== Related media ==
=== Games ===
1. Super Duper Halo-Halo
2. Babysitting Squee
3. Karaoke Night
4. Sakto
