= Goldie & Bear =

American animated television series

- Genre: Fantasy; Comedy
- Created by: Jorge Aguirre
- Based on: "Goldilocks and the Three Bears" by Robert Southey
- Developed by: Jorge Aguirre; Rick Gitelson
- Written by: Rick Gitelson
- Directed by: Chris Gilligan
- Voices of: Natalie Lander; Georgie Kidder
- Opening theme: "Goldie & Bear" by Adrianne Dayle Nigg
- Ending theme: "Goldie & Bear" (Instrumental)
- Composers: Rob Cantor; Gregory James Jenkins; Greg Nicolett
- Country of origin: United States
- Original language: English
- No. of seasons: 2
- No. of episodes: 45 (88 segments) (list of episodes)

Production
- Executive producers: Chris Gilligan; Rick Gitelson; Jan Korbelin; Jorge Aguirre (co, season 1); Ben Kalina; Chris Prynoski; Shannon Prynoski (season 2)
- Running time: 22 minutes (Note: Each episode consists of two 11-minute segments.)
- Production companies: Milk Barn Entertainment (season 1); Titmouse, Inc. (season 2)

Original release
- Network: Disney Junior (Note: The first season premiered on Watch Disney Junior prior to its air on television.)
- Release: September 12, 2015 – October 1, 2018

Goldie & Bear is an American 3D-animated fantasy children's television series created by Jorge Aguirre for Disney Junior. The series is produced by Milk Barn Entertainment and Titmouse, Inc in its first and second seasons, respectively. Inspired by the fairy tale "Goldilocks and the Three Bears," the show focuses on Goldie and Bear, who become best friends following an incident at his house.

The show was created to preserve children's memories of classic fairy tales and characters. Its episodes try to pay homage to the original fairytales and nursery rhymes while giving additional insight into their storylines and underlying meanings. Maria Tatar, a Disney Junior advisory board member, provided advice on storytelling, fairytales, and folklore as the show's consultant.

The show launched on Disney Junior and Disney Channel in November 2015. Episodes were released on Watch Disney Junior two months prior to their broadcast on the network. The series was renewed for a second season in March 2016, which premiered in September 2017. The final episode aired on October 1, 2018. Goldie & Bear received general positive reviews from critics, with praise for its music and characters.

== Premise ==
After the incident at little Jack Bear's house in "Goldilocks and the Three Bears", Goldilocks (nicknamed Goldie) apologizes to him, and the two become best friends. They go on adventures throughout the Fairytale Forest—often meeting characters from various fairy tales and nursery rhymes, including Little Red Riding Hood, Humpty Dumpty, and the cow who jumped over the Moon from "Hey Diddle Diddle."

== Voice cast ==
=== Main ===
- Natalie Lander as Goldie Locks, a precocious and impulsive 11-year-old girl who befriends Bear
- Georgie Kidder as Jack Bear, a neat and tidy 8-year-old bear who becomes Goldie's best friend

=== Recurring ===
- Jim Cummings as:
  - The Big Bad Wolf, a wolf who enjoys scaring other creatures and making trouble.
  - The Giant, a large humanoid character who lives in the clouds at the top of a beanstalk over Fairytale Forest.
- Justine Huxley as:
  - Red Riding Hood, a clean but somewhat snobby child who delivers muffins from her father The Muffin Man to her grandmother.
  - The Little Old Woman Who Lives in a Shoe, the mother of many children who lives in a giant shoe.
- Mitchell Whitfield as:
  - Humpty Dumpty, an accident-prone egg.
  - The Woodsman who constantly tries to cut down trees throughout Fairytale Forest
- David Kaufman as:
  - Jack, a young boy who traded his family's cow for three magic beans.
  - Brix, the brick-laying pig from "The Three Little Pigs".
- Mary Birdsong as:
  - Mama Bear, Bear's mother
  - Mother Goose, a large goose
  - Jack's Mom
- Barry Wiggins as Papa Bear, Bear's father
- David Lodge as:
  - The Magic Gnome, a small wise gnome who lives in a tree in Goldie and Bear forest and grants whoever finds him a single wish.
  - Magic Cobbler, a magical gnome that creates magical shoes.
  - Baley, the straw-laying pig from "The Three Little Pigs".
- Kath Soucie as:
  - Twigs, the wood-building pig from "The Three Little Pigs".
  - The Tooth Fairy, a legendary figure who replaces a lost tooth with a gold coin.
- Lesley Nicol as Fairy Godmother, a helpful fairy who tends cause issues with her magic.
- Maya Ritter as Ginger, the Gingerbread Witch from "Hansel and Gretel"
- Tom Kenny as Phil the Big Good Wolf, Big Bad's older brother who used to be a bad wolf, but changed his ways after helping someone.
- Philece Sampler as Granny, Red Riding Hood's grandmother
- Miles Brown as Jack, a young boy who runs a lemonade stand with his sister
- Marsai Martin as Jill, a young girl who runs a lemonade stand with her brother
- Justin Felbinger as Jack B. Nimble, a self-centered boy known for jumping over candlesticks
- Henry Kaufman as Jack Horner, a boy known for sticking his finger into pies and pulling out plums
- Thomas Lennon as Brian, a mouse that lives in the wall of Bear Family house and the grandson of the mouse from "Hickory Dickory Dock"
- Scott Foley as Prince Charming, the Fairytale Forest prince who looks out for his subjects, and is good friends with Goldie and Bear
- Michael McKean as Robin Locks, Goldie's father who is the Fairytale Forest barber
- Jane Lynch as Marian Locks, Goldie's mother who travels around the world collecting items her customers are looking to buy
- Debby Ryan as Thumbelina, a small teenage girl who’s also Goldie and Bear’s babysitter.

== Episodes ==
Season	Segments	Episodes	Originally aired	
Season	Segments	Episodes	First aired	Last aired
1	43	22	September 12, 2015	August 15, 2016
2	45	23	September 18, 2017	October 1, 2018

== Production ==
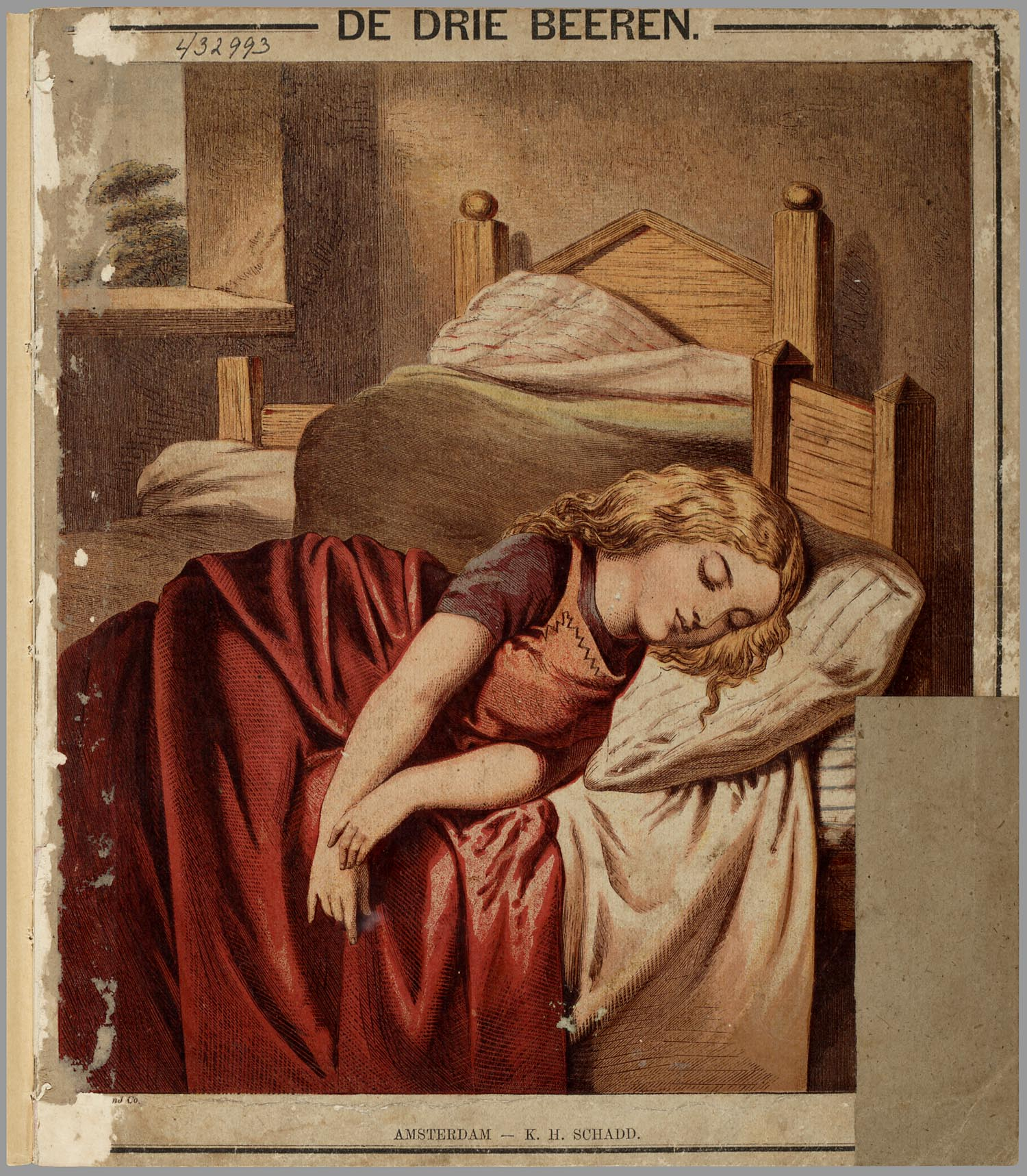
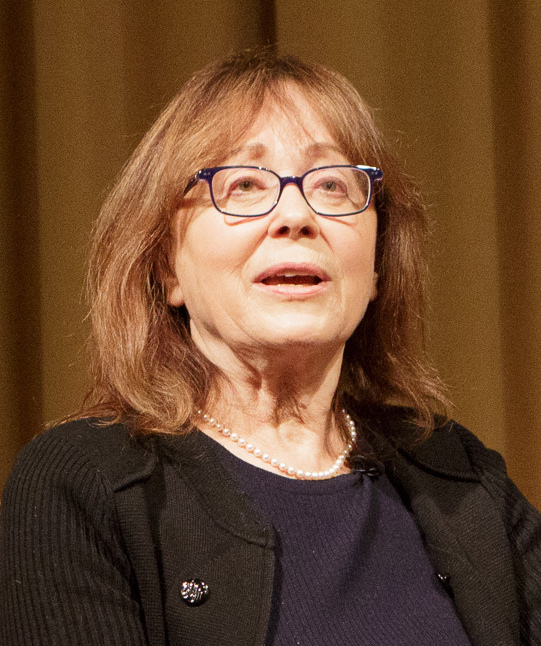
Goldie & Bear is based on the fairy tale "Goldilocks and the Three Bears" (left), with Maria Tatar (right) as the consultant.

According to Nancy Kanter, executive vice president of original programming and general manager of Disney Junior Worldwide, the network is trying to preserve children's memories of classic fairy tales and characters, especially due to the increased focus on math, science, and document analysis in education. Such stories serve as the inspiration for a large portion of The Walt Disney Company's most well-known and lucrative intellectual properties. Kanter stated, "Disney Junior embraces strong storytelling and memorable characters, and nothing reflects that more than classic fairytales." Goldie & Bear's episodes are intended to highlight the significance of storytelling by paying homage to the original fairytales and nursery rhymes while giving additional insight into their storylines and underlying meanings. Throughout the series, the characters of Goldie and Bear focus on friendship and community, as well as imaginative problem-solving and critical thinking through rationality and strategy.

In February 2015, Disney Junior greenlit the show, to air later that year. Maria Tatar, a Disney Junior advisory board member, acts as the series consultant, providing advice on storytelling, fairytales, and folklore. Tatar noted that because the stories are both seemingly basic and profoundly complex, they are timeless. The first season of the show was produced by Milk Barn Entertainment, while production shifted to Titmouse, Inc. for the second season.

== Broadcast ==
The show premiered on Disney Junior and Disney Channel on November 11, 2015. The first season concluded on August 15, 2016. In March 2016, Disney Junior renewed the series for a second season, which aired from September 18, 2017, to October 1, 2018.

On September 12, 2015, before their premiere on Disney Junior, six episodes of the show were released on Watch Disney Junior. Following this, episodes premiered weekly on the app from September 21 to October 12. Prior to Goldie & Bear, Disney Junior had digitally distributed new series. The company originally offered episodes of Sheriff Callie's Wild West available for download before it aired on Disney Junior in 2014. Callie's premiere had some of the highest viewership on the network, despite the episodes being available ahead of time. Paul DeBenedittis, senior vice president of programming strategy for Disney Channels Worldwide, noted that making the episodes available for mobile and on-demand viewing enables children to connect with the content several times early on.

Walt Disney Studios Home Entertainment released a DVD, titled Goldie & Bear: Best Fairytale Friends, on April 19, 2016.

Goldie & Bear was initially streamable on Netflix, with its first and second seasons being released in September 2016 and October 2018 respectively. The series later became available to stream on Disney+, after its Netflix contract expired.

== Reception ==
=== Critical response ===
Emily Ashby of Common Sense Media gave the show a grade of four out of five stars, with praise for its characters, themes, and songs. Describing the show as a "win-win", she stated the stories will be enjoyed by children who are familiar and unfamiliar with the source material. According to Ashby, Goldie & Bear manages to maintain key elements of each of its characters' backstory while blending them into a cohesive cast. Alex Reif of Laughing Place commented favorably on the setting, characters, and music, and praised the decision to include certain fairytale characters that Disney had not yet included in any of their productions.

=== Ratings ===
In 2016, it was reported that Goldie & Bear received the highest viewership across all preschool networks in 2015.

== Lawsuit ==
In June 2018, the creators filed a lawsuit against Disney for breach of contract after production on the second season was transferred to another studio. Disney was alleged to have "already secretly lined up a rival production company called Titmouse" to produce the second season of the series—and "lured away most of Plaintiff Milk Barn's [the first season's production company] employees in New York to work for Titmouse by falsely claiming that Milk Barn was closing and the employees were being transferred", which "made it virtually impossible for those companies to ever be in the children’s television or feature business again". The suit also alleged that Disney told Korbelin to fire the original executive producer of the show and take over his duties—and that Korbelin is still owed more than $250,000 for his 18 months as an executive producer on the show. Disney commented that the Plaintiffs' damages "are estimated to be a minimum of $20 million".
