= Alma's Way =

Children's animated television series

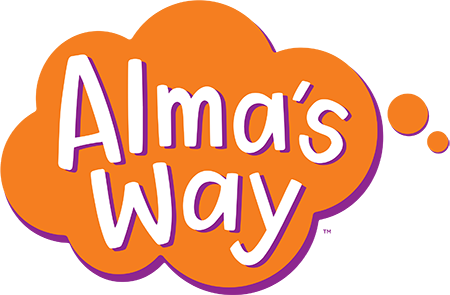
- Genre: Slice of life Adventure; Fantasy; Preschool
- Created by: Sonia Manzano
- Directed by: Dave Barton Thomas; Shawn Seles
- Voices of: Summer Rose Castillo; Julian Lerner; Jesus E. Martinez; Annie Henk; Neo Vela; Danny Bolero; Sharon Montero; Marco Antonio Rodriguez; Jacob Crespo; Dave Droxler; Emily Isabel; Al Quagliata; David Howard Thornton
- Theme music composer: Lin-Manuel Miranda; Bill Sherman
- Opening theme: "It's Alma's Way!", performed by Flaco Navaja and Summer Rose Castillo
- Ending theme: "It's Alma's Way!" (instrumental)
- Composers: Asher Lenz; Stephen Skratt; Fabiola Mendez
- Country of origin: United States
- Original languages: English; Spanish
- No. of seasons: 3
- No. of episodes: 70 (136 segments + 1 unaired) (list of episodes)

Production
- Executive producers: Sonia Manzano; Ellen Doherty
- Running time: 25 minutes
- Production companies: Pipeline Studios; Fred Rogers Productions

Original release
- Network: PBS Kids
- Release: October 4, 2021 – present

Related
- Mister Rogers' Neighborhood; Daniel Tiger's Neighborhood

Alma's Way is an American animated children's television series from Fred Rogers Productions created and executive produced by former Sesame Street actress Sonia Manzano and animated by Canadian animation studio Pipeline Studios. The series premiered on PBS Kids on October 4, 2021.

The show is set in The Bronx, New York and revolves around Alma Rivera, a 6-year-old Puerto Rican girl, as she ventures out into her Latino neighborhood to demonstrate decision-making and social-awareness skills. The title's meaning refers to Alma's ability of thinking things through, to help her solve problems within each episode. On August 2, 2022, it was announced the series was renewed for a second season which premiered on September 18, 2023. The second season introduced a new female character named Yolette, new voice actors for Eddie and André, and a new live-action, post-episode segment called My Way. On February 28, 2025, it was announced the series was renewed for a third season.

== Premise ==
The series centers on Alma Rivera, a six-year-old Hispanic girl residing in the Bronx with her family and friends. Each day presents her with various challenges and problems, and she consistently takes the time to stop, listen, observe, reflect, and articulate her thoughts to navigate these everyday issues.

== Episodes ==
Season	Segments	Episodes	Originally released	
Season	Segments	Episodes	First released	Last released
1	76	39 (Note: Although Season 1 in actuality has 40 episodes, the second-to-last episode of the season ("Snow Day in the Bronx/Say I Guess to the Dress") isn't considered part of the series' official ordering by PBS (as the second segment went unaired for reasons unknown, and the first was delayed and eventually released on the PBS Kids YouTube channel in 2025, during the airing of the second season), and is thus omitted from this total count. On October 18, 2024, the episode was temporarily released on the website and video app, before being removed on the same day.)	October 4, 2021	October 18, 2024
2	45	23	September 18, 2023	October 1, 2025
3	TBA	TBA	January 19, 2026	TBA

== Characters and interstitial shorts ==
=== Alma's family ===
- Alma Rivera (voiced by Summer Rose Castillo) is an optimistic 6-year-old Puerto Rican-American girl. She seems to have a role as the leader of the group. She likes solving problems. Her favorite baseball team is the Sweat Sox. In "Alma Goes to Puerto Rico", it was stated that she's named after her great-grandmother. Her catchphrase is "I’ve gotta think about this!"
- Rubén Rivera Jr. a.k.a. "Junior" (voiced by Neo Vela in Seasons 1-2 and Logan Alarcon-Poucel in Season 3-present) is Alma's 5-year-old younger brother who loves dinosaurs and dancing. His favorite singer is Elyssa B, and his favorite baseball team is the City Seagulls.
- Lulú Rivera a.k.a. "Mami" (voiced by Annie Henk) is Alma and Junior's mother, and Ruben's wife. She is a musician and music teacher. She is a great cook, but isn't good at making mofongo. Her favorite singer is Elyssa B.
- Rubén Rivera a.k.a. "Papi" (voiced by Jesús E. Martinez) is Alma and Junior's father, and Lulú's husband. He's a veterinarian, and hosts his own show called Rubén to the Rescue. His favorite baseball team is the City Seagulls.
- Gustavo a.k.a. "Abuelo" (voiced by Danny Bolero) is Lulú and Gloria's father, and Alma, Junior and Eddie's maternal grandfather.

=== Recurring ===
- Eduardo Montoya a.k.a. "Eddie Mambo" (voiced by Jacob Crespo in Season 1, Adrian Marrero in Season 2, and Luca Silva in Season 2, Episode 19-present) is Alma's next-door neighbor and cousin. He is a gifted musician who plays drums, guitar, and horn. He wears leg braces and uses crutches due to cerebral palsy.
- Nestor Montoya a.k.a. "Uncle Nestor" (voiced by Marco Antonio Rodriguez) is Alma's uncle and Eddie's father. He is a playwright and musical director of a Bomba ensemble.
- Gloria Montoya a.k.a. "Tía Gloria" (voiced by Sharon Montero) is Alma's aunt and Eddie's mother. She is a New York City Transit Authority Train Conductor.
- André King (voiced by Niason DaCosta in Season 1, Ja'Siah Young in Season 2, and Emjay Roa in Season 3-present) is Alma's friend. He is great at drawing and sketching.
- Rafia Huda (voiced by Naysa Nishash Shokeen in Seasons 1-2 and Rachael Dutta in Season 3-present) is Alma and André's Bangladeshi friend. She loves to play sports. She is 7 years old.
- Lucas Reed (voiced by Julian Lerner in Season 1 and Declan Fennell in Season 2, Episode 9-present) is Alma, André and Rafia's friend. He is a gifted singer.
- Becka (voiced by Emily Isabel) is Alma and Eddie's friend, a 12-year-old Jewish-American girl.
- Safina Huda (voiced by Jenna Qureshi) is Rafia's older sister. She volunteers at Rubén's pet clinic.
- Harper (voiced by Uschi Umscheid) is Alma's friend, an only child whose father is away serving in the military.
- Alberto Martinez a.k.a. "Beto" (voiced by Felipe Salinas in Season 1 and Christopher Navarro in Season 2-present) is Alma's friend and newest neighbor. He and his family are introduced in the episode "New Neighbors", where it is stated that they moved to the Bronx from San Diego.
- Emilia Martinez a.k.a. "Emi" (voiced by Charlotte Rose Holmes) is Beto's younger sister and Alma and Junior's friend. She has a pet lizard named Manchas.
- Owen Reed (voiced by Andy Talen) is Lucas's father.
- Anik Huda (voiced by Ratnesh Dubey) is Rafia and Safina's father. He owns a small grocery store.
- Nea Omenma King (voiced by Justine J. Hall) is André's mother. She owns a bookstore. Alma introduces her as Mrs. Omenma in the episode, "Alma's Masterpiece".
- James King (voiced by James Monroe Iglehart) is André's father. He is a cook and likes experimenting with different kinds of foods.
- Elena Martinez (voiced by Jaqueline Guillén) is Beto and Emi's mother.
- Ángel Martinez (voiced by Anthony Michael Irizarry) is Beto and Emi's father.
- Frankie Four Feet (voiced by Victor Cruz) is the owner of the Bronx Community Center.
- Granny Isa (voiced by Sonia Manzano) is Alma's maternal grandmother. She is a flight attendant who travels the world.
- Howard (voiced by Dwight H. Clarke in Season 1, Episode 15b - Season 2, Episode 7a, Chance Smith in Season 2, Episode 8 - Season 2, Episode 9a, Dwayne H. Clarke in Season 2, Episode 10b - Season 2 Episode 23a, and Arlo Tyrannosaurus in Season 3-present) is Alma, Junior, Lucas, Rafia, Eddie, André, and Harper's friend. He loves playing water tag.
- Yolette (voiced by Khloe Bruno) is Alma, Junior, and André's friend.

=== Jelly, Ben & Pogo ===
Starting from the show's premiere, television airings are followed up by Jelly, Ben & Pogo, which are shorts that focus on Filipino culture.

=== Other shorts ===
Beginning in November 2022, it was replaced by Molly of Denali: The Big Gathering, which are shorts based on Molly of Denali. On December 26 in the same year, television airings are also followed up by City Island, a series of shorts centered on civics that follows a group of sentient object characters.

== Related media ==
=== Games ===
1. Party at Alma's
2. Bop or Pop
3. The Alma Train
4. Boom, Boom, Bah
5. Alma on the Case
6. Dominoes
7. Create with Alma
8. Dino Dance Party

== Reception ==
Adiba Nelson of The Washington Post wrote, "Afro-Latino children finally have characters they can relate to."

=== Awards and nominations ===
Year	Award	Category	Nominee	Result	Ref.
2022	Imagen Awards	Best Voice-Over Actor (Television)	Summer Rose Castillo	Won	
2022	Imagen Awards	Best Youth Programming	Alma's Way	Won	
2023	Imagen Awards	Best Youth Programming	Alma's Way	Won	
