= Jorge Aguirre (author) =

American writer and producer

- Occupations: Author, television show writer and producer
- Spouse: Carla Gutierrez (2006–2023)

Jorge Aguirre is an American author and children's television show writer and producer. Aguirre has written shows for Nick Jr., Disney Jr., Netflix, Amazon, and PBS. He is the writer of the graphic novel series The Chronicles of Claudette for Macmillan/First Second Books. The series includes Giants Beware, Dragons Beware, and Monsters Beware. He is also the co-creator of Disney Jr.'s Goldie & Bear with Rick Gitelson. He has also written for Martha Speaks, Dora the Explorer, Dora and Friends, Handy Manny and other shows. As of 2023, Aguirre is working on a new graphic novel series for middle school-aged children with Andrés Vera Martínez called Monster Locker.

Aguirre's work has been reviewed by major publications, including Booklist, Kirkus Reviews, The New York Times, Publishers Weekly, and Wired.

== Biography ==
Aguirre was born and raised in Columbus, Ohio to Colombian parents.

He lives in Montclair, New Jersey.

== Awards and honors ==
In 2012, Giants Beware! received an honorable mention in Publishers Weekly's Critics Poll for best graphic novels of the year.

Awards for Aguirre's writing
Year	Title(s)	Award	Result	Ref.
2013	Giants Beware!	Mythopoeic Award for Children's Literature	Finalist	
2015	Dragons Beware!	Cybils Award for Elementary and Middle Grade Graphic Novel	Finalist	
2019	Giants Beware!; Dragons Beware!; Monsters Beware!	Mythopoeic Award for Children's Literature	Finalist	

== Bibliography ==
=== Standalone books ===
- Trees for the Okapis: Little Green Nickelodeon, illustrated by Art Mawhinney (2010, Simon Spotlight, ISBN 9781416990901)
- Call Me Iggy, illustrated by Rafael Rosado (expected 2023, First Second Books)

=== Adapted books ===
- First Day of School, illustrated by Victoria Miller, adapted from Dora the Explorer (2019, Simon Spotlight, ISBN 9781416978480)

=== Chronicles of Claudette series ===
The Chronicles of Claudette books are illustrated by Rafael Rosado and published by First Second Books.

1. Giants Beware! (2012, ISBN 9781596435827)
2. Dragons Beware! (2015, ISBN 9781596438781)
3. Monsters Beware! (2018, ISBN 9781626721807)

== Filmography ==
Aguirre's filmography
Year	Title	Role	Notes
1999	Pacho's Revenge	Director	
2000	A More Perfect Union	Producer	
2003–2004	History Detectives	Associate producer; Director; Producer	3 episodes (director); 10 episodes (producer)
2005	Circumsized Cinema	Producer; Writer	5 episodes
2005–2010	Go, Diego, Go!	Staff Writer; Writer	9 episodes
2008	Moe	Line producer	
2008–2019	Dora the Explorer	Staff Writer; Writer	16 episodes
2010–2011	Handy Manny	Writer	5 episodes
2011–2012	Martha Speaks	Writer	2 episodes
2012	Imagination Movers	Writer	1 episodes
2014–2015	Dora and Friends	Staff Writer; Writer	14 episodes
2015-2017	Goldie & Bear	Creator; Producer; Writer	17 episodes (creator and writer); 16 episodes (producer)
2017–2018	Nina's World	Writer	8 episodes
2019	Corn & Peg	Writer	1 episode
2020	Hero Elementary	Writer	3 episodes
2020–2021	Santiago of the Seas	Writer	2 episodes
2020–2021	Blue's Clues & You!	Story editor; Writer	19 episodes
2021–present	Alma's Way	Head writer; Screenplay writer	70 episodes
2025	Valiente: A Tracker Story	Writer	
