= Rick Gitelson =

American film producer

Rick Gitelson (born December 15, 1962) is an American television and film producer, screenwriter, and director. He co-created the animated television series Goldie & Bear and won an Emmy Award for writing and producing the television series Rugrats.

== Biography ==
Gitelson was born in Washington, D.C..

His writing and producing credits include Rugrats, Goldie & Bear, Imagination Movers, Handy Manny, LazyTown, Dragon Tales, Recess, and Hey Arnold! for TV; and Whispers in the Dark, A Case for Murder, Becoming Dick and The Family Plan for film. He co-created Goldie & Bear with Jorge Aguirre.

== Recognition ==
He won a 2002-2003 Emmy Award and a 1999 Humanitas Award for writing and producing the Nickelodeon television series Rugrats and the 2010 Writers Guild of America Award for Imagination Movers. He has also received a Vision Award from the National Association for Multi-Ethnicity in Communications, a Genesis Award from the Humane Society, an Imagen Award, and an Environmental Media Award, for his work on Handy Manny.
