= Once upon a time (disambiguation) =

"Once upon a time" is a stock phrase used to introduce a narrative of past events.

Once upon a time may also refer to:

== Film ==
- Donkey Skin (film), a 1970 French film also known in English as Once Upon a Time or The Magic Donkey
- Once Upon a Time (1918 film), a British silent romance directed by Thomas Bentley
- Once Upon a Time (1933 film), a French drama film
- Once Upon a Time (1944 film), an American fantasy starring Cary Grant
- Once Upon a Time (1973 film), a West German animated musical written and directed by Roberto Gavioli and Rolf Kauka
- Once Upon a Time (1995 film), a Thai drama
- Once Upon a Time (2008 film), a South Korean heist comedy
- Once Upon a Time (2013 film), an Indian Malayalam animated film directed by Binu Sasidharan
- Once Upon a Time (2017 Chinese film), a Chinese romantic drama
- Once Upon a Time (2017 Russian film), a Russian comedy-drama film
- Once Upon a Time film trilogy by Sergio Leone, consisting of:
  - Once Upon a Time in the West, a 1968 epic Western film
  - Duck, You Sucker!, a 1971 epic Western film
  - Once Upon a Time in America, a 1984 epic crime drama film
- Windaria, a 1986 Japanese anime film also known in English as Once Upon a Time or Legend of Fabulous Battle Windaria

=== Television ===
- Once Upon a Time (TV series), a 2011 American fantasy drama
  - Once Upon a Time in Wonderland, a spin-off of Once Upon a Time
- Once Upon a Time... (franchise), a French educational animation franchise
  - Once Upon a Time... Man, in 1978
  - Once Upon a Time... Space, in 1982
  - Once Upon a Time... Life, in 1987
  - Once Upon a Time... The Americas, in 1991
  - Once Upon a Time... The Discoverers, in 1994
  - Once Upon a Time... The Explorers, in 1996
  - Once Upon a Time... Planet Earth, in 2008
- Once Upon a Time, Granada TV series from 1979–1983, featuring Peter Davison
- "Once Upon a Time" (The Prisoner), a 1968 episode of the allegorical science-fiction series The Prisoner
- "Once Upon a Time" (The Twilight Zone), a 1961 episode of the anthology series The Twilight Zone
- "Once Upon a Time", a 1995 television special of the PBS show Shining Time Station
- "Once Upon a Time" (Star Trek: Voyager), a 1998 episode of the science-fiction series Star Trek: Voyager
- "Once Upon a Time" (Charmed), a 2000 episode of the fantasy series Charmed
- "Once Upon a Time...", a 2011 episode of the drama series Dexter
- Wansapanataym (Filipinization of the phrase, "once upon a time"), a Philippine fantasy anthology
- "Once Upon a Time..." (The Night Agent), a 2026 episode of the action thriller series The Night Agent

== Literature ==
- Once Upon a Time, an 1854 collection by Charles Knight
- Once Upon a Time (Italian: C'era una volta), 1882 collection by Luigi Capuana
- Once Upon a Time, 1897 collection by Mary Eleanor Wilkins Freeman
- Once Upon a Time, 1910 novel by Richard Harding Davis
- Once Upon a Time, 1918 play by Rachel Crothers
- Once Upon a Time: A Book of Old-Time Fairy Tales, 1921 collection edited by Katharine Lee Bates
- "Once Upon a Time", poem by Nigerian writer Gabriel Okara, featured in his 1978 collection The Fisherman's Invocation
- Once Upon a Time, 1986 novel by Lucy Gordon
- Once Upon a Time, 1989–1992 series of novels by Kay Hooper
- Once Upon a Time: A Treasury of Modern Fairy Tales, 1991 collection edited by Lester del Rey and Risa Kessler
- Once Upon a Time, 1992 novel by Rebecca Flanders
- Once Upon a Time, 1993 children's book by John Prater and Vivian French
- Once Upon a Time, 1993 collection by Alan Garner
- Once Upon a Time: A Floating Opera, 1994 novel by John Barth
- Once Upon a Time, 1997 novel by Francine Pascal, the 132nd installment in the Sweet Valley High series
- Once Upon a Time, 2000 omnibus of four novels by Irene Brand, Lynn A. Coleman, Yvonne Lehman and Gail Gaymer Martin
- Once Upon a Time, 2002 novel by Barbara Fradkin
- Once Upon a Time (novel series), 2002–2010 series of novels by Simon Pulse
- Once Upon a Time, 2004 graphic novel by Serena Valentino

== Music ==
=== Albums ===
- Once Upon a Time (The Lettermen album), 1962
- Once Upon a Time (Earl Hines album), 1966
- Once Upon a Time (The Kingston Trio album), 1969
- Once Upon a Time (Donna Summer album), 1977
- Once Upon a Time: The Singles, a 1981 album by Siouxsie and the Banshees
- Once Upon a Time (Simple Minds album), 1985
- Once upon a Time (Marty Stuart album), 1992
- Once upon a Time (Liverpool Express album), 2003
- Once Upon a Time (Dreadzone album), 2005
- Once Upon a Time (S.H.E album), 2005
- Once Upon a Time (Tiwa Savage album), 2013
- Once Upon a Time, a 2001 album by Claudia Christian

=== EPs ===
- Once Upon a Time (EP), a 2019 EP by Lovelyz
- Once Upon a Time, a 1993 EP by Jadis
- Once Upon a Time, a 2000 EP by Kahimi Karie
- Once Upon a Time, a 2021 EP by Chika

=== Songs ===
- "Once Upon a Time" (Air song), from the 2007 album Pocket Symphony
- "Once Upon a Time" (Charles Strouse and Lee Adams song), from the 1962 musical All American
- "Once Upon a Time" (Jimmy Johnson song) recorded by Rochell & the Candles in 1960
- "Once Upon a Time" (Marvin Gaye and Mary Wells song), from the 1964 duet album Together
- "Once Upon a Time" (The Pogues song), from the 1993 album Waiting for Herb
- "Once Upon a Time", one of the songs written by Cole Porter
- "Once Upon A Time", by Anup Rubens, Mukesh Mohamed and Ramya NSK from the 2016 Indian film Uyire Uyire
- "Once Upon a Time", by Donna Summer from the 1977 album Once Upon a Time
- "Once Upon a Time", by Kamelot from their 2010 album Poetry for the Poisoned
- "Once Upon a Time", by Jimmy Nail from the 1994 album Crocodile Shoes
- "Once Upon a Time", by Simple Minds from the 1985 Once Upon a Time album
- "Once Upon a Time", by the Linda Lindas from the 2024 album No Obligation
- "Once Upon a Time", by the Smashing Pumpkins from the 1998 album Adore
- "Once Upon a Time", by Toby Fox from the soundtrack of the 2015 video game Undertale
- "Once Upon a Time", by the Vels from the 1986 album House of Miracles

== Other uses ==
- Once Upon a Time (Disney parks), a US–Japan video projection show
- Once Upon a Time (Devon theme park), a former attraction in England, UK
- Once Upon a Time (game), a family, storytelling-themed card game
- "Once Upon a Time", a painting series by Johannes Heisig
- "Once Upon a Time", the signature phrase of the eccentric Australian businessman and philanthropist W.A. Crowle, who used it as the name of one of his residences and a halfway house that he established in Sydney

== See also ==
- Twice Upon a Time (disambiguation)
- Once on a Time, a 1917 novel by A. A. Milne
- Once Upon a Time in the West, a 1968 epic Western film by Sergio Leone
- Once Upon a Time in America, a 1984 epic crime drama film by Sergio Leone
- Once Upon a Time in Anatolia, a 2011 Turkish film by Nuri Bilge Ceylan
- Once Upon a Time in Shaolin, a 2015 album by Wu-Tang Clan
- Once Upon a Time in Mesopotamia, a 1998 French documentary film
- Once Upon a Time in Mexico, a 2003 action film by Robert Rodriguez
- Once Upon a Time in the Midlands, a 2002 film by Shane Meadows
- Once Upon a Time in Mumbaai, a 2010 Indian film by Milan Luthria and subsequent franchise
- Once Upon a Time in Hollywood, a 2019 film by Quentin Tarantino
- Thrice Upon a Time, a 1980 novel by James P. Hogan
