= Michel Legrand discography =

List of albums by Michel Legrand

This is a list of albums by Michel Legrand.

== Selected discography ==
=== Albums ===
- 1954 I Love Paris
- 1955 Holiday in Rome
- 1956 Castles in Spain
- 1957 Bonjour Paris
- 1957 C'est magnifique
- 1958 Legrand in Rio
- 1958 The Columbia Album of Cole Porter
- 1959 Paris Jazz Piano
- 1959 The New I Love Paris
- 1959 Legrand Jazz
- 1960 Legrand Piano
- 1962 Strings On Fire (Philips Records)
- 1963 Michel Legrand Big Band Plays Richard Rodgers (Philips Records)
- 1964 Archi-Cordes
- 1964 Plays for Dancers (US release of Archi-Cordes)
- 1967 Violent Violins (UK release of Archi-Cordes)
- 1967 Cinema Legrand (MGM Records)
- 1968 At Shelly's Manne-Hole
- 1968 Si C'est Ça La Musique À Papa
- 1968 Je M'appelle Barbra (Columbia)
- 1974 Twenty Songs of the Century
- 1980 Atlantic City
- 1983 After the Rain
- 1993 Michel Plays Legrand
- 1995 Michel Legrand Big Band
- 2002 Michel Legrand by Michel Legrand
- 2013 Entre elle et lui (with Natalie Dessay)

With Miles Davis, Bill Evans, Paul Chambers, John Coltrane

- Legrand Jazz (Philips - Europe / Columbia - the Americas, 1958)

With Stan Getz

- Communications '72 (Verve, 1972)

With Lena Horne

- Lena & Michel (RCA, 1975)

With Bud Shank

- Windmills of Your Mind (World Pacific, 1969)

With Sarah Vaughan

- Sarah Vaughan with Michel Legrand (Atlantic, 1972)

With Frankie Laine

- Foreign Affair (Philips -Europe / Columbia -US, 1958)
- Reunion in Rhythm (Columbia, 1959)

With Melissa Errico

- Legrand Affair, (Ghostlight Records, 2019)

With Stephane Grapelli

- legrand grappeli, (Verve Records, 1992)

== Filmography ==
- Lovers Net (Les amants du Tage) (1954)
- Continente perduto (orchestrated) (1955)
- Charmants garçons (1958)
- Le Triporteur (1958)
- L'Amérique insolite (1958)
- L'Americain se détend (1958)
- Terrain vague (co-composer) (1960)
- A Woman Is a Woman (Une femme est une femme) (1960)
- The French Game (Le cœur battant) (1960)
- Les Portes claquent (1960)
- Lola (1961)
- Cléo from 5 to 7 (Cléo de 5 à 7) (1961)
- The Seven Deadly Sins (Les Sept péchés capitaux) (co-composer) (1961)
- The Winner (Un cœur gros comme ça) (1961)
- Retour a New York (1962)
- Comme un poisson dans l'eau (1962)
- Eva (1962)
- Une grosse tete (1962)
- My Life to Live (Vivre sa Vie: Film en Douze Tableaux) (1962)
- Bay of Angels (La baie des anges) (1962)
- L'Amerique lunaire (1962)
- Histoire d'un petit garcon devenu grand (1962)
- Le Joli Mai (1962)
- Illuminations (1963)
- Le grand escroc (1963)
- L'Empire de la nuit (1963)
- Love Is a Ball (1963)
- The Umbrellas of Cherbourg (Les Parapluies de Cherbourg) (1964)
- A Ravishing Idiot (Une ravissante idiote) (1964)
- Band of Outsiders (Bande à part) (1964)
- Fascinante amazonie (1964)
- Les amoureux du France (1964)
- La Douceur du village (1964)
- A Matter of Resistance (La vie de château) (1965)
- Quand passent les faisans (1965)
- Tender Scoundrel (Tendre voyou) (1965)
- Monnaie de singe (1965)
- Who Are You, Polly Maggoo? (Qui êtes-vous, Polly Maggoo?) (1966)
- The Plastic Dome of Norma Jean (1966)
- L'an 2000 (1966)
- Gold and Lead (L'or et le plomb) (1966)
- The Young Girls of Rochefort (Les Demoiselles de Rochefort) (1967)
- A Matter of Innocence (also known as Pretty Polly) (1967)
- L'homme à la Buick (1967)
- How to Save a Marriage and Ruin Your Life (1967)
- Sweet November (1968)
- The Thomas Crown Affair (1968)
- Play Dirty (1968)
- The Appointment (rejected) (1968)
- Ice Station Zebra (1968)
- Michel's Mixed Up Musical Bird (1968)
- The Swimming Pool (La Piscine) (1968)
- Castle Keep (1969)
- The Happy Ending (1969)
- The Picasso Summer (1969)
- Pieces of Dreams (1969)
- The Magic Garden of Stanley Sweetheart (1970)
- Wuthering Heights (1970)
- Donkey Skin (Peau d'Âne) (1970)
- The Lady in the Car with Glasses and a Gun (La Dame dans l'auto avec des lunettes et un fusil) (1970)
- The Go-Between (1971)
- The Married Couple of the Year Two (Les mariés de l'an II) (1971)
- Summer of '42 (1971)
- Le Mans (1971)
- Touch and Go (La Poudre d'escampette) (1971)
- A Few Hours of Sunlight (Un peu de soleil dans l'eau froide) (1971)
- A Time for Loving (Also: Paris Was Made for Lovers) (1972)
- La vieille Fille (The Old Maid) (1972)
- Lady Sings the Blues (1972)
- Not Dumb, The Bird (1972)
- Portnoy's Complaint (1972)
- Hearth Fires (Les feux de la Chandeleur) (1972)
- One Is a Lonely Number (1972)
- The Outside Man (Un homme est mort) (1972)
- A Doll's House (1973)
- The Nelson Affair (Also: Bequest to the Nation) (1973)
- Story of a Love Story (1973)
- The Hostages (Le gang des otages) (1973)
- 40 Carats (1973)
- Cops and Robbers (1973)
- Breezy (1973)
- The Man Who Loved Cat Dancing (rejected) (1973)
- The Three Musketeers (1973)
- A Slightly Pregnant Man (L'Evenement le plus important depuis que l'homme marche sur la lune) (1973)
- Our Time (1974)
- F for Fake (1974)
- Section spéciale (Special Section) (1975)
- The Savage (Le Sauvage) (1975)
- Sheila Levine Is Dead and Living in New York (1975)
- Gable and Lombard (1976)
- Ode to Billy Joe (1976)
- Le voyage de noces (1976)
- The Smurfs and the Magic Flute (La flute à six schtroumpfs) (1976)
- Gulliver's Travels (1977)
- The Other Side of Midnight (1977)
- Routes to the South (Les routes du sud) (1978)
- Mon premier amour (1978)
- The Phoenix (1978)
- Lady Oscar (1979)
- Je Vous Ferai Aimer La Vie (1979)
- The Fabulous Adventures of The Legendare Baron Munchhausen (Les fabuleuses aventures du légendaire Baron de Munchausen) (1979)
- Atlantic City (1980)
- The Hunter (1980)
- The Mountain Men (1980)
- Les Uns et les Autres (also known as Bolero) (1980)
- Hinotori (co-composer) (1980)
- Falling in Love Again (1980)
- What Makes David Run? (Qu'est-ce qui fait courir David?) (1981)
- Le Cadeau (1981)
- Chu Chu and the Philly Flash (1981)
- Your Ticket Is No Longer Valid (1982)
- Slapstick of Another Kind (1982) (1982 cut)
- La revanche des humanoides (1982)
- Best Friends (1982)
- The Gift (1982)
- Yentl (1983)
- Never Say Never Again (1983)
- A Love in Germany (Un amour en Allemagne) (1983)
- Secret Places (1984)
- Love Songs (Paroles et musique) (1984)
- Palace (1985)
- Partir, revenir (1985)
- Operation Double Cross (1985)
- Parking (1985)
- Crossings (1986)
- Sins (1986)
- Casanova (1987)
- Social Club (Club de rencontres) (1987)
- Spirale (1987)
- Switching Channels (1988)
- Three Seats for the 26th (Trois places pour le 26) (1988)
- Five Days in June (Cinq jours en juin) (1989)
- Flight from Paradise (Fuga dal Paradiso) (1990)
- Dingo with Miles Davis (1991)
- Gaspard et Robinson (1991)
- The Burning Shore (1991)
- The Pickle (1993)
- Ready to Wear (Prêt-à-Porter) (1994)
- Angels in the Outfield (1994)
- Les Misérables (1995)
- Les Enfants de Lumière (1995)
- Aaron's Magic Village (1997)
- Madeline (1998)
- Doggy Bag (1999)
- Season's Beatings (La Bûche) (1999)
- The Blue Bicycle (La Bicyclette Bleue) (2000)
- And Now... Ladies and Gentlemen (2002)
- Cavalcade (2005)
- Disco (2008)
- Oscar and the Lady In Pink (Oscar Et Le Dame En Rose) (2009)
- La rançon de la gloire (2014)
- The Guardians (2017)
- The Other Side of the Wind (2018)
- J'ai perdu Albert (2018)
- May December (2023) (posthumous, reorchestrated by Marcelo Zarvos)

== Computer games ==
- Torin's Passage (1994)

== Television ==
- Brian's Song (1971)
- Oum le Dauphin Blanc (1971)
- The Adventures of Don Quixote (1973; a BBC One Play of the Month)
- It's Good to Be Alive (1974)
- Cage Without a Key (1975)
- Michel's Mixed-Up Musical Bird (1978; an ABC Afterschool Special)
- Once Upon a Time... Space (1981)
- A Woman Named Golda (1982)
- The Jesse Owens Story (1984)
- Promises to Keep (1985)
- As Summers Die (1986)
- Once Upon a Time... Life (1986)
- Not a Penny More, Not a Penny Less (1990)
- The Burning Shore (1991)
- Once Upon a Time... The Americas (1991)
- Once Upon a Time... The Discoverers (1994)
- The Ring (1995)
- Once Upon a Time... The Explorers (1997)
- Songbird Sings Legrand (A Concert with Regine Velasquez) (2002)
- Once Upon a Time... Planet Earth (2008)
