= List of French animated television series =

This is a list of animated television programs that have been produced by France. It includes series made by France alone, as well as those produced in collaboration with various other countries. For live action French series, see: List of French television series.

== Adult ==
Original title in France	English title (or literal meaning)	Year	Studio	Summary	Technique
Agrippine	Agrippine	2001	Ellipse	Coming-of-age series about a girl named Agrippine	Traditional
Funky Cops	Funky Cops	2002–2004	Antefilms Production	An animated series about two cops in San Francisco during the 1970s.	Digital
G.G.	N/A	2016–2017	Bobby Prod	Series about two brothers who play video games inspired by the original YouTubers	Digital
G.I.R.L.	N/A		Bobby Prod	Adult series examining the role of women in modern society	Digital
L’Odyssée de Klassik	Klassik's Odyssey	2019–2021	Bobby Prod	Adult animated series about a jerboa who travels time meeting characters from classical mythology	Digital
Les Kassos	The Wakos	2013–present	Bobby Prod	Adult animated series about a variety of pop culture parody characters who we meet in the office of a social worker	Digital
Monsieur Flap	N/A		Bobby Prod	Adult romantic comedy series about a deformed man with an ass for a face and testicles for a mouth	Digital
Startup Heroes	N/A	2016–present	Bobby Prod	Adult animated interview series commissioned by the University of Paris-Saclay where pop culture characters discuss their successes	Digital

== Adventure ==
Original title in France	English title (or literal meaning)	Year	Studio	Summary	Technique
Albert le Cinquième Mousquetaire	Albert the Fifth Musketeer	1993–1994	France Animation	Set after the Siege of La Rochelle, Albert, the Fifth Musketeer, joins the Four Musketeers on new adventures	Traditional
Capitaine Fracasse	Captain Fracasse	1999–2000	Ellipsanime	Who really is Fracasse? He is several characters at once: a brilliant actor, a shy young man and a mysteriously masked swordsman who bravely fights injustice.	Traditional
Cartouche, prince des faubourgs	Cartouche, neighborhood prince	2001–2002	Xilam, Storimages	The highly romanticized adventures of Cartouche in 18th-century Paris. With the help of his friends from the Cour des miracles, he stands up to the Regent to improve the daily lives of Parisians	Traditional
A Cow, a Cat and the Ocean	A Cow, a Cat and the Ocean	2006	Futurikon	A cow and a cat leave their farm behind in search of a better life.	Digital
Les Aventures de Colargol	Barnaby (UK), Jeremy the Bear (Canada)	1967–1974	Procidis	Stop-motion animated series about a bear named Colargol who wants to sing and travel the world.	Stop Motion
Bob Morane	Bob Morane	1998	Canal+	Animated adaptation of the series of popular adventure books featuring Bob Morane, created by French-speaking Belgian novelist Henri Vernes.	Traditional
Les Chroniques de Zorro	Zorro: The Chronicles	2015	Cyber Group Studios	A 3D Animated Series about the Zorro, his witty brother Beenardo and best friend Ines. With his remarkable exsplay of swordminship trying to defeat the evil general and his goons.	CGI
Popples	N/A	2015–2016	Zagtoon	An amazing species of creatures that can pop into and out of a ball.	CGI
Sammy & Co	N/A	2015–2017	Zagtoon	Following the story of young turtles, Ricky and Ella, and their friends, Annabel the Octopus and Pipo the Butterfly Fish.	CGI
Mystery Lane	N/A	2022–present	Studio Hari		CGI
La Petite Géante	The Small Giant	2008–2010	Gaumont		Traditional
Wheel Squad	N/A	2000–2002	Moonscoop	Set in a large, dark metropolis, the protagonists Akim, Jessica, Bob and Johnny are four young geniuses who love extreme sports and together form the staff of the Wheel Squad.	Traditional

== Comedy ==
Original title in France	English title (or literal meaning)	Year	Studio	Summary	Technique
Agrippine	(lit. Agrippina)	2001	Ellipsanime	A series of twenty-six episodes, each lasting twenty-six minutes, based on the comic book by French artist Claire Bretécher. Stories center around the exploits of the titular character, Agrippine, a spoiled teenage girl. "Agrippine" is the French version of the name "Agrippina".	Traditional
Ana Pumpkin		2021	Folimage	A five-year-old girl with a ginger afro finds out about the world with her dog, Fleas	Digital
Alvinnn!!! and the Chipmunks	N/A	2015–2023	Technicolor Animation Productions	Dave Seville, a single father who is raising six singing Chipmunks (Brittany, Jeanette, and Eleanor part time, and Simon, Alvin, and Theodore) as his adoptive kids	CGI
Bêtes à Craquer	Animal Crackers	1997–1999	Alphanim	The adventures of a group of assorted species of anthropomorphic animals in a fictional African wildlife reserve. Based on the 1967 to present comic strip of the same name by Rog Bollen and Fred Wagner.	Traditional
Blaise le blasé	Fred's Head	2008	Spectra Animation	A Canadian-French animated series made by Spectra Animation and Galaxy 7, featuring Fred (Blaise), a sixteen-year-old and his not-so-normal life.	Digital
Bravo Gudule	Miss BG	2005–2008	Gaumont	A show about an 8-year-old girl name Gudule (English: BG) who hang out with out in a tree house with two friends, Gad and Alex.	CGI
Bunny Maloney	N/A	2009	MoonScoop, Telegael, France Télévisions	Bunny Maloney is a pink anthropomorphic rabbit, and he is often blundering and over-confident.	CGI
Cosmic Cowboys	N/A	2003–2004	Gaumont	A sci-fi buddy show about two intergalactic bounty hunters: Curtis and Dook.	Traditional
Calimero	N/A	2014	Gaumont	Calimero is an animated television series about a charming, but hapless anthropomorphized chicken; the only black one in a family of yellow chickens.	CGI
Les Cahiers D'esther : Histoires De Mes 12 Ans	The Diaries of Esther : Stories From When I Was 12 Years Old	2018	Folimage	A young girl documents her journey of growing up in her diary. It is an adaptation of Riad Sattouf's comic book series, which was inspired by a real-life girl.	Digital
Les Crumpets	The Crumpets Teen Crumpets	2013–2021	4.21 Productions	Based on the children's picture books by Didier Lévy and illustrated by Frédéric Benaglia, it centers on Lil-One, the youngest child of his huge family who seeks to get his mother's love, and the family's matriarch Granny. Seasons 3 and 4 follow the lives of the show's teenage characters.	Digital
Denver the Dinosaur	N/A	2018–present	Zagtoon	A reboot of Denver the Last Dinosaur, a short-lived French-American cartoon from the late 1980s.	CGI
Mon pote le fantôme	Dude, That's My Ghost!	2013	Gaumont	Spencer Wright is the budding-filmmaker new kid at a high school populated by Hollywood royalty. He's got a friend in the ghost of pop star Billy Joe Cobra.	Flash
F is for Family	N/A	2015–2021	Gaumont	Set in the 1970s. This raunchy animated comedy follows an Irish-American Family living in Pennsylvania.	Digital
Furiki Wheels	N/A	2017	Gaumont	A hyperactive young sloth with oodles of energy wants to see the world, so he goes to Racers School to learn how to drive fast.	Flash
Garfield et Cie	The Garfield Show	2008–2016	Dargaud	CGI animated series based on the American comic strip Garfield by cartoonist Jim Davis.	CGI
Grenadine et Mentalo	Grenadine and Peppermint	2011	Cyber Group Studios	The adventures of an Inuk girl and her penguin friend. Based on the comic books by Colonel Moutarde.	Digital
La Chouette & Cie	The Owl & Co	2013–2016	Hari Productions		CGI
Grizzy et les Lemmings	Grizzy & the Lemmings	2016–present	Hari Productions	The slapstick-style show about a brown bear named Grizzy and a group of trouble making blue Lemmings who were living in a Forest Ranger's cabin in forest.	CGI
Gargantua	N/A	1993–1994	France 3, SFP Production, Pixibox, Europe Images, RTP, Studio SEK		Traditional
Hairy Scary	N/A	2007	Gaumont	Willow & Constance are just your ordinary Hairy & Scary kids having adventures in an "extra-ordinary" world. Like any Hairy worth his salt, Willow is a boy who greets each day with enthusiasm – and maybe a little too much naivete.	CGI
Jean-Luc & Faipassa	Jean-Luc and Dondoozat	1998	Canal+	A zany, unintelligible short about a couple strange creatures pulling off random things. One creature, a tall, skinny, orange creature is attempting to teach at least adequate manners to a short, wild, green creature.	Digital
Kobushi	N/A	2009	Zagtoon	When a fancy sushi restaurant, Kobushi, closes down for the night, the sushis come to life, spending the entire evening avoiding traps set by the famous white porcelain cat, Manekineko, who has also awakened, and with an appetite for fish.	Digital
La Vie en slip	Smarty Pants	2022	Red Frog; Studio Agent Double	Three boys spend their summer break in the town of Bamboche trying to become the coolest kids by the start of the school year. Based on the comics by Steve Baker.	Digital
Magic	A Kind of Magic	2008–2018	Xilam		Digital
Matt & les monstres	Matt's Monsters	2008–2009	Gaumont	Matt is ready for action as he enlists his dad, his neighbour Manson and his pet monster Dink to run a monster agency as they hunt down for monsters of all shapes, sizes and forms and save the city of Joliville.	Digital
Le Monde fou de Tex Avery	The Wacky World of Tex Avery	1997	Ellipsanime	An animated tribute to the cartoonist Tex Avery, featuring cartoon characters inspired from his creations.	Digital
Mouss & Boubidi	N/A	2009–2011	Gaumont		Digital
Oggy et les Cafards	Oggy and the Cockroaches	1998–2019	Gaumont	The slapstick-style show of a lazy blue cat named Oggy, whose quiet life keeps being interrupted with three cockroaches named Joey, Marky and Dee-Dee. Sometimes Oggy's cousin Jack also helps him to fighting against cockroaches.	Traditional / Digital / CGI (for some scenes)
Les Shadoks		1968–2009	Animation Art Graphique Audiovisuel (AAA)		Traditional
My Life is a Manga		2026 (upcoming)	Blue Spirit	Upcoming animation series about Lira, a girl who draws Japanese-influenced graphic novels to solve problems.	Digital
My Life Me	N/A	2010–2011	Carpediem Film and Television	Birch Small's school system requires her and her classmates, Liam, Sandra, and Raffi to work together in a group known around the school as a "Pod." The students don't get to choose who they are partnered up with; they must work together, despite their differences and shortcomings.	Digital
Oscar et Malika, toujours en retard	Nate Is Late	2018–present	Watch Next Media	Schoolchildren Nate (Oscar in the French dub) and Malika get caught up in adventures every day while walking to school, causing them to be late.	Digital
Pat et Stanley	Pat & Stan	2004	Mac Guff		CGI
Pok & Mok	N/A	2011	Gaumont		Digital
Potatoes and Dragons	N/A	2004	Gaumont	To put an end to a curse, King Hugo III calls upon all knights specialized in dragon slaying, promising his daughter's hand to the successful candidate.	Digital
Ralf the Record Rat	N/A	2003–2004	Gaumont	Ralf the record rat is ready to do anything to establish a world record in any discipline and preferably the most wacky.	Traditional
Rosie	N/A	2011–2014	Zagtoon	Always dressed in black, Rosie casts a sardonic and offbeat eye on the world around her. And she's never at a loss for words. Her world is confined to her house and its surroundings, where she regularly meets her neighbor, Olive, who she takes a malignant pleasure in driving up the wall. Whenever she feels the need, Rosie brings in her imaginary friend Blackie, an easy-going green sheep. A good friend, he is the only person she confides in because Blackie has the advantage of never being able to tell anyone else her secrets.	Digital
L'apprenti d'Pere Noël	SantaApprentice	2006	Gaumont	Every 163 years, it's time to find a replacement for Santa Claus.	Traditional
Allo la terre, ici les Martin	Spaced Out	2001–2005	Gaumont	Hired by mistake, George Martin is hired as director of a secret orbital station (Operation SOS) housing sub-development, where he and his family have to live as an experiment started by Krach.	Traditional
The Babaloos	N/A	1995–1998	MoonScoop	The show is about a group of home appliances that live in a suburban house.	Traditional
Les blagues de Toto	Toto Trouble	2010	Gaumont	Toto, the most famous kid on the playground, has taken on a new dimension in the albums published by Delcourt. He is now going to become a star of the small screen!	Traditional
Titeuf	Tootuff	2001; 2017	Canal J	Based on the Swiss comic series created by Zep.	Traditional
Tom-Tom et Nana	Tom-Tom and Nana Tom and Lili	1997–2019	4.21 Productions	Two animated series adaptations produced in 1997 and 2019, about the lives of the mischievous kids, Tom-Tom and Nana, and their family the Dubouchons, who own a restaurant. Based on the comic strip originally written by Jacqueline Cohen and illustrated by Bernadette Després.	Traditional
Transformice: The Cartoon Series	N/A	2015–2016	Atelier 801	An animated TV series based on the video game Transformice.	Digital
The Weasy Family	N/A	2024–present	Hari Productions		CGI
Woofy	N/A	2004–2005	Gaumont	In a household where no pets are allowed, a dog, in cahoots with his little boy master, passes himself off as a stuffed animal.	Traditional
Canards extrêmes	X-DuckX	2001–2003	Gaumont	The series chronicles the wacky and dangerous adventures of a duo of ducks, Slax and Geextah, extreme sports fans.	Traditional
Zap collège	Zap Junior High	2007	Gaumont	The daily but not boring life of Alastair Heath-Wilson, son of the Education Secretary of State, parachuted in 4th E to the experimental school " Cliff Richard Junior High "	Traditional
Zig et Sharko	Zig & Sharko	2010–2024, 2027 or 2028–present	Xilam	The comedy show about a hyena named Zig and a Shark named Sharko.	Digital
Zip Zip	Zip Zip	2015–2020	GO-N Productions		Digital
Zoé Kézako	N/A	2004	Sparx Animation Studios	A series featuring the titular girl from the books by Véronique Saüquère.	Digital
Zombie Hôtel	Zombie Hotel	2005–2007	Gaumont	Fungus and Maggot, two child zombies who pretend to be human to get into their local school, and their family and boarders at the hotel run by their parents.	Traditional

== Comedy-drama ==
Original title in France	English title (or literal meaning)	Year	Studio	Summary	Technique
Belle et Sebastian	Belle and Sebastian	2017	Gaumont	Follows the adventures of a slightly wild 6-year-old boy from the French Alps region, close to the Italian border, and his relationship with a generous dog, a Great Pyrenees, shunned for her enormous size.	Digital
Les Copains de la Forêt	Forest Friends	2006–2007	Timoon Animation	In the series, a wildfire has driven away many species of forest animals, who reluctantly must live uneasily with each other. But seven young open-minded survivors taught by their mentor the Old Oak of the Forest, step forth to prove that the animals no matter how different they are from each other, can live and work together as a community in peace and friendship. Frequently the rats cause trouble and inconvenience for the animals.	Traditional
Orson and Olivia	Orson et Olivia	1993	Ellipsanime		Traditional
Potlach	The title is an alternate spelling of "Potlatch".	2006	Ellipsanime	A reality-show style animated series about cows, chickens, sheep and so on living on a farm, called Potlach. The farm is in the middle of nowhere and there are no humans on it. Much of the story revolves around the characters' romances, which are often interspecies.	CGI

== Fantasy ==
Original title in France	English title (or literal meaning)	Year	Studio	Summary	Technique
Argaï : la prophétie	Argai: The Prophecy	2000	Carrére Groupe	Argaï, an anthropomorphic lion, must travel through time, making friends along the way in order to save the love of his life	Traditional
Archibald le Magi-Chien	Archibald the Magic Dog	1980–1981	DIC Audiovisuel	A magician transforms himself into a dog and teaches a boy about how to stay healthy	Traditional
Abraca	Abraca	2019	Ankama	Spin-off series to the video game Abraca about an apprentice magician in the world Imagi	Digital
Bouli	N/A	1989–1991	C2A	A show about Bouli the snowman and his friends, who were brought to life by the moon.	Traditional
Chasseurs de dragons	Dragon Hunters	2006–2012	Futurikon	The adventures of two hunters for hire in a medieval world of floating land masses terrorized by a varying menace of monsters known as dragons.	Digital
Clémentine	N/A (title is the main character's name)	1985–1987	Narcisse X4	A ten-year-old girl, who was rendered a paraplegic in an airplane crash, travels the world with her family in search of a cure for her condition. At night she dreams that she can walk and travels through time and fantasy, with her magic guardian Hérméra, and her flying cat Hélice, fighting demons.	Traditional
Creepschool	N/A	2004	Gaumont	Welcome to the school where your fears and nightmares become a hilariously creepy reality! Ghouls in the classroom! Elsa, Josh and the other kids have personal dilemmas and everyday problems just like the rest of us. But in the twilight zone of Creepschool nothing stays everyday for very long.	Traditional
Dofus: Aux trésors de Kerubim	Dofus: The Treasures of Kerubim	2013–2014	Ankama	Dofus: The Treasures of Kerubim, is an animated series set in the world of the Dofus MMORPG	Digital
Gayajin	N/A	TBA	Zagtoon	With threat of destruction at the hands of an extraterrestrial villain, the planet reaches out to two young kids, offering them the powers of the earth with which to fight back. Assuming total control of both creatures and flora/fauna, with the weight of the world in tow, proves to be quite a heavy load... but also comes with copious amounts of kick-earth fun & adventure!	CGI
Gawayn	N/A	2009–2013	Gaumont	In the mystical city of Camelot, William is an optimistic knight-in-training who is devoted to his mentor, knight in gleaming armour, Sir Roderick. The complication starts when the evil Duke of Amaraxos shrinks Princess Gwendolyn and takes over the kingdom, so the friends accompanied with Elspeth, an apprentice sorceress and Xiao Long, a young sage-in-training from distant Asia, set off on an adventure to undo the terrible curse by finding The Great Book of Magic.	Digital
Gormiti	Gormiti: The Lords of Nature Return! (Season One) Gormiti: The Supreme Eclipse Era! (Season Two); Gormiti: The Neorganic Evolution (Season Three)	2008–2010	Zodiak Kids Studios	The show follows two brothers, Nick and Toby, who discover that they have the power to transform into powerful creatures known as Gormitis. Their two friends Jessica and Lucas join the fight, and together they harness the power of the four elements. Now it's up to them to save their world, and many others, from destruction.	Traditional
Jason et les héros de l'Olympe	Jason and the Heroes of Mount Olympus	2001–2002	Saban International	Jason is a twelve-year-old with fantasies of becoming a hero just like those in the mythological battles of the Ancient World. He is in for a surprise as his dreams become a reality when he climbs to the top of Mount Olympus and fulfills an ancient prophecy, turning Jason into the “chosen one”.	Traditional
Lanfeust Quest	N/A	2013	Gaumont	Lanfeust is an orphan and an apprentice blacksmith who can heat metal at will. His adventure begins when he is asked to mend the sword of a passing aristocrat.	CGI
Les Legendaries	The Legendaries	2017–2020	Technicolor Animation Productions	The Legendaries are five heroes who, in an attempt to stop an evil sorcerer named Darkhell from using the Stone of Jovénia, one of six magical stones used to create the world of Alysia, were unable to keep it from shattering, causing everyone, themselves included, to revert to childhood.	CGI
Mona le Vampire	Mona the Vampire	1999–2006	Gaumont	Mona Parker, Lily Duncan, Charley Bones ("Zapman"), and Mona's pet cat, Fang, imagine themselves confronting monsters and solving supernatural mysteries.	Traditional
Le Manège enchanté	(lit. The Enchanted Roundabout)	1963–1976	AB Productions	In the magical country of Bois-Joli, a terrier named Pollux and his friends have many strange occurrences and minor adventures. The original French program was later reworked for the UK series The Magic Roundabout which ran from 1965 to 1978. In this English version all of the same animation was used; however, the narrator Eric Thompson rewrote the stories by saying whatever seemed appropriate, based on the action that was on the screen.	Stop Motion
Le Manège enchanté	The Magic Roundabout	2007–2008	Ellipsanime	A computer-animated remake of the original 1963–1976 series.	CGI
L'île à Lili	Lili's Island	2006		Lili, Matthieu (Matt in English) and Pataglue (Glueball in English) are three kids who were mysteriously transported from Palavas-les-Flots to a peculiar island in another dimension.	Traditional
LoliRock	N/A	2014–TBD	Zodiak Kids Studios		Traditional
Moonlight Hunters	N/A	TBA	Zagtoon	Set in London, the English-language skein turns on five high school friends who make a discovery on Halloween night that gives them the power to turn into a vampire, ghost, werewolf, creature, and witch, and protect the British capital from evil forces.	CG
Les Petites Sorcières	The Little Witches	1997–1999	Millésime Productions	Sherilyn, an experienced magician, teaches three little witches to use magic to do good deeds. But, the town of City Base is under threat from a shameless man, Walt Street, who desires wealth and power. Fortunately, the little witches are there to thwart his plans.	Traditional
Rahan	Rahan	2009–2010	Xilam	The second adaption of Rahan, a prehistoric caveman who wanders the earth, encountering a wide variety of tribes and challenges on his way.	Traditional
Rahan – Fils des âges farouches	Rahan: Son of the Dark Age	1987	Moonscoop	The first adaption of Rahan, a prehistoric caveman who wanders the earth, encountering a wide variety of tribes and challenges on his way.	Traditional
Riley's Believe It Or Not	N/A	2000–2003	Gaumont	They'll visit strange sites, meet peculiar people, witness fantastic feats and, at the end of every episode, secure yet another awesome oddity. Believe It or Not!	Traditional
SuperStar	N/A	2022	Zagtoon	Extremely talented musicians, singers, dancers and actors have gone through an extensive auditioning process to attend the prestigious Hollywood School of the Arts (HSA) in Hollywood, California. Not only are they here to further their respective artistic careers, but also to compete for a spot in a worldwide concert, towards the goal of achieving ultimate fame and unlocking their full potential	CGI
Tales of Feryon	N/A	TBA	Zagtoon	A fantasy superhero show about a girl with magical hair that helps her get out of difficult situations	CGI
The Jungle Book	N/A	2010–2020	Moonscoop	The adventures of Mowgli, a human foundling raised by Akela's wolf pack, and his best friends, fatherly bear Baloo and playful panther Bagheera. They live in the Indian jungle where many dangers lurk, such as the mighty Bengal tiger Shere Khan. The inquisitive Mowgli often gets himself into trouble and can't resist helping animals in danger or solving other problems.	CGI
Trulli Tales	N/A	2017–2019	Gaumont	Set in the fictional world of Trullalleri, the series revolves around four children and one teacher who learn how to cook from their Grandma Trulli's cookbook from the past. But when Copperpot tries to steal it, the four children; Ring, Zip, Stella, and Sun, must stop him with the magical power from their wands.	Flash
Wakfu	N/A	2008–2017	Ankama	Based on the French MMORPG of the same name by Ankama Games. Twelve year-old Yugo discovers his power to create teleportation portals and sets out to find his real family. Accompanying him on his quest are his new friends Tristepin (the guardian of a demon-possessed sword; named Sadlygrove in the English dub), Ruel Stroud (an old man from his village), Princess Amalia (who can talk to plants) and her bodyguard Evangelyne.	Digital
W.I.T.C.H.	N/A	2004–2006	SIP Animation	The show follows five girls – Will, Irma, Taranee, Cornelia and Hay Lin – who have respective magical powers over the classical elements quintessence, water, fire, earth and air, which they use to fulfill their duties as Guardians of the Veil.	Traditional

== Mystery/detective ==
Original title in France	English title (or literal meaning)	Year	Studio	Summary	Technique
Archie, mystères et compagnie	Archie's Weird Mysteries	1999–2000	DIC Productions, L.P. Les Studios Tex	Archie and his gang go on new adventures solving mysteries	Traditional
Arlene Lupin	N/A	1971–1974	Moonscoop	Loosely based on the novels by Maurice Leblanc featuring master thief Arsène Lupin	Traditional
Geronimo Stilton	N/A	2009–2017	Moonscoop	Geronimo Stilton is a journalist and head of the Geronimo Stilton Media Group. He travels New Mouse City and around the world for new scoops while having adventures along the way with his nephew Benjamin, cousin Trap, sister Thea and Benjamin's friend Pandora Woz.	Traditional
Inspecteur Gadget	Inspector Gadget	1983–1986	DIC Audiovisuel	The misadventures of an incompetent cyborg police inspector called Inspector Gadget. He is aided in his investigations by his brilliant niece and dog who secretly monitor his every action and keep him out of trouble.	Traditional
Gadget Boy	Gadget Boy	1995–1998	DIC Productions, L.P. France Animation	Spin-off to Inspector Gadget featuring a bionic kid-detective with a personality similar to that of Gadget.	Traditional
Gadget & les Gadgetinis	Gadget & the Gadgetinis	2002–2003	DIC Entertainment Corporation; SIP Animation	Spin-off to Inspector Gadget.	Traditional
Les Aventures de Tintin	The Adventures of Tintin	1991–1992	Ellipsanime	Second television adaptation of Belgian artist Georges Remi's popular comic book series Les Aventures de Tintin (English: The Adventures of Tintin).	Traditional
Les Aventures de Tintin, d'après Hergé	Hergé's Adventures of Tintin	1959–1964	Belvision Studios	First television adaptation of Belgian artist Georges Remi's popular comic book series Les Aventures de Tintin (English: The Adventures of Tintin).	Traditional
Les enquêtes de Mirette	Mirette Investigates	2016	Cyber Group Studios	A series about young detective Mirette and her talking cat Jean-Pat on their adventures around the world, based on the books by Fanny Joly and Laurent Audouin.	Digital
Sherlock Yack	N/A	2011	MoonScoop	A children series about Sherlock Yack, a zoo manager and detective who, with the help of his assistant Hermione, finds clues and interview the suspects, in order to find the culprit.	Digital
The Green Squad	N/A	2011	Gaumont	Claire, Julian, Thomas and their trusty ferret Wifi travel the world with their wildlife documentary film-making parents.	Digital
Les Mystères d'Alfred	The Mysteries of Alfred Hedgehog	2010	Gaumont	N/A	Traditional
Les nouvelles aventures de Spirou et Fantasio	The New Adventures of Spirou and Fantasio	2006–2009	Belvision Studios	The adventures of the intrepid Spirou, accompanied by his reporter friend Fantasio and his squirrel Spip.	Traditional

== Pre-School ==
Original title in France	English title (or literal meaning)	Year	Studio	Summary	Technique
Archibald le Magichien	(lit. Archibald the Magic dog or Archibald the Magician dog)	1980–1981	DIC Audiovisual	A magician, named Archibald, has transformed himself into a dog but cannot remember how to turn himself back. Now he spends his time teaching his new friend, a boy named Pierre, about the importance of hygiene and good health.	Traditional
Ariol	N/A	2020	Folimage	A donkey learns about growing up in a school with a wide variety of animals	Digital
Atout 5	N/A	2007–2008	Euro Visual	Five friends dream of forming a band	Digital
Ava Riko Teo	N/A	2008–present	Moonscoop	Preschool animation about a giraffe, a rabbit and a koala	Digital
Chloe' s Closet	N/A	2010–2014	Moonscoop	The adventures of a four-year-old Chloe and her friends as they go on magical adventures while playing dress-up in her closet at her room.	Digital
Cooking? Child's Play!	N/A	2005	Gaumont	Prune and Bob bring the world's favourite recipes to the fingertips of aspiring young chefs: 13 entrees, 13 mouth-watering main courses and 13 desserts with top tips and lots of fun!	
Il était une fois... l'homme	Once Upon a Time... Man	1978	Procidis	The first Il était une fois... (Once Upon a Time...) series. Twenty-six episodes, each twenty-six minutes long, telling the story of humans from the beginning of humankind to the end of the twentieth century. Most episodes are about history but the last is set in the future. The same characters, a family and their closest friends and enemies, are used in each story, though the stories are all set in different time periods.	Traditional
Il était une fois... la vie	Once Upon a Time... Life	1987	Procidis	The third Il était une fois... (Once Upon a Time...) series.	Traditional
Il était une fois... les Amériques	Once Upon a Time... The Americas	1991	Procidis	The fourth Il était une fois... (Once Upon a Time...) series.	Traditional
Il était une fois... les Découvreurs	Once Upon a Time... The Discoverers	1994	Procidis	The fifth Il était une fois... (Once Upon a Time...) series.	Traditional
Il était une fois... les Explorateurs	Once Upon a Time... The Explorers	1996	Procidis	The sixth Il était une fois... (Once Upon a Time...) series.	Traditional
La Fée Coquillette	Magic Lilibug	2010	Les Armateurs	A fairy ladybug grants the wishes of her animal friends.	Digital
Franklin	N/A	1997–2004	Gaumont	Franklin focuses on the eponymous growing young turtle who, as his television stories and books always begin, "could count by twos and tie his shoes".	Traditional
La Vie des animaux	(lit. The Life of animals)	1952–1966		Stylized drawings of animals animated to music. Created by Frédéric Rossif, with commentary by Claude Darget.	
La tribu Monchhichi	Monchhichi	2017–present	Technicolor Animation Productions	Monchhichi monkeys return in a new CGI series for brand new adventures	CGI
Petit Poilu	Little Furry	2016–present	Dupuis	A series of dialogue-free shorts about the fantastical adventures of a little boy, based on the picture books by Pierre Bailly and Céline Fraipon	Digital
Oui-Oui, Enquêtes au Pays des Jouets	Noddy, Toyland Detective	2016	Gaumont	Noddy turns detective. Accompanied by his dog Bumpy and car Revs, Noddy travels to the four corners of Toyland to investigate mysteries.	CGI
Souris des villes, souris des champs	The Country Mouse and the City Mouse Adventures	1997–1998	Moonscoop	The show follows the adventures of two cousin mice, Alexander from the city and Emily from the country, who go on adventures around the world in the late 19th and early 20th century, usually to help their cousins, solve a mystery, or stop the evil rat, No-Tail No-Goodnik.	Traditional
Stillwater	N/A	2020	Gaumont	Kids with typical kid challenges have Stillwater, a wise panda, as their next-door neighbour.	CGI
Rolie Polie Olie	N/A	1998–2004	Sparx	The show focuses on the Polie Family, who live in a teapot-shaped house in a geometric world (Planet Polie) populated by robot-based characters.	CGI
Welcome to Bric-a-Broc	N/A	2019	Gaumont	Mino is a cat sent to live on an old farm so he can learn how to behave. With a long list of rules to follow, Mino can't seem to help continue getting in trouble	Digital
Anatole Latuile	N/A	2018	Label Anim	Anatole Latuile is a young boy who is always getting into trouble	Digital
Allen Raconte,	Come On, Tll Me	2006	Les Armateutrs	Two children enter their father into a storytelling contest	Digital
Babar	N/A	1989–1991; 2004	Ellipsanime	Based on the books by Jean de Brunhoff and Laurent de Brunhoff. The King of the elephants, Babar, tells stories of his adventurous youth to his children	Traditional
Babar – Les aventures de Badou	Babar - The Adventures of Badou	2010–2015	TeamTO	The adventures of Badou, grandson of the famous king of the elephants, Babar.	CGI
Bibifoc	Seabert	1984–1986	SEPP International SA	The adventures of a baby seal named Bibifoc ("Seabert" in the English language version), a boy named Tommy and a girl of Inuit descent named Ayma ("Aura" in English) as they rescue various animals from poachers	Traditional
Les Grandes Grandes Vacances	The Long Long Holiday	2015–2018	Les Armateurs	A 3D-Animated adventure-drama series about the two siblings, Ernest and Colette, staying to their grandparent's place in Normandy and having an experience during World War II.	CGI
Loulou de Montmartre	N/A	2008–2009	Pictor Media Animation	Loulou is an orphan young girl, who dreams to becoming a great dancer, but after the death of the good Father Menard she goes to live in the Orphanage of the nasty Madame Trochu, who makes every effort to prevent Loulou to fulfill her desire. And who is the mysterious man that follows Loulou from a distance and that seems to know everything about her past? Are Loulou parents really dead?	Traditional
Monsieur Bonhomme	Mr. Men and Little Miss	1995–1997	Marina Productions	An animated TV series based on the original Mr. Men and Little Miss books created in the 1970s and 1980s by British author Roger Hargreaves and his son Adam Hargreaves.	Traditional Digital

== Shortcom ==
Original title in France	English title (or literal meaning)	Year	Studio	Summary	Technique
Avez-vous déjà vu..?	(lit. Have you ever seen..?)	2006		One hundred and fifty episodes, each about 45 seconds long. The format consists of a narrator asking, "Have you ever seen..?" followed by various outlandish scenarios such as, "A chip in a G-string", "Houses who compete at who can spit the furthest" or "A horror movie for candy". Then there is a short, comical animation enacting the described situation. Each sketch ends with the narrator saying, "Maintenant, Oui" (English: "Now, Yes").	Digital

== Spy ==
Original title in France	English title (or literal meaning)	Year	Studio	Summary	Technique
Miss Rose	N/A	TBA	Zagtoon	Two estranged sisters who must learn to deal with teenage challenges, assimilation, and of course, protecting a magical power from the forces of evil.	CGI
Totally Spies!	N/A	2001–2014, 2024–present	Zodiak Kids Studios	A parody of spy films and teen television series inspired by the 1970s series Charlie's Angels. It follows the adventures of three teenage girls who are in reality secret agents.	Traditional/Digital
Pop Secret	N/A	N/A	N/A	N/A	Digital

== Superheroes ==
Original title in France	English title (or literal meaning)	Year	Studio	Summary	Technique
Atomic Puppet	N/A	2016–2017	Technicolor Animation Productions	Mega City's superhero Captain Atomic suffers a setback when, as he shaking hands with 12-year-old fanboy Joey Felt, his disgruntled sidekick Mookie (or Sergeant Subatomic) transforms him into a living sock puppet.	Digital
Combo Niños	N/A	2008	SIP Animation	4 juvenile capoeira practitioners named Paco, Serio, Azul and Pilar, protect the city of Nova Nizza from attack by mystical creatures from another dimension called "Divinos". The Combo Niños have the ability to transform into mystical beings in animal form by touching one of the totems that appear on the Divinos. This form gives them unique skills that serve them in the battle against the Divinos and to perform special attacks called Big Blastico, used to return a Divino back to its own dimension.	Digital
Delta State	N/A	2004	Gaumont	Claire, Luna, Martin and Philip are four "anti" super-heroes in their early twenties. Gifted with paranormal powers, they are the only ones who can rid humanity of the "Rifters", some mysterious entities seeking control of human minds... Their fight will essentially take place in a strange parallel universe called the "Delta State".	CGI
Enigma	N/A	1997	Millésime Productions		Traditional
Ghostforce	N/A	2021	Zagtoon	In a new series from Zag, high school kids working as a team of superheroes, the "Ghost-force", secretly fight against the ghosts that haunt their town in a wacky, comedic fashion. With inherent desire to "troublemake," the ghosts, which are invisible to the human eye, will use fright as fuel to increase their power and ability to affect the world around them. Our heroes have no choice but to put their daily lives on hold in order to ghost power-up and restore the city to normalcy before citizens catch.	CGI
Fantastic Four: World's Greatest Heroes	N/A	2006–2010	Moonscoop	Mr. Fantastic, The Invisible Woman, The Human Torch and The Thing, otherwise known as Marvel's most famous family, the Fantastic Four. Following the original comic story-lines, characters, and plots, the Fantastic Four will battle their most famous villains including their mortal enemy, Dr. Doom.	Traditional
Miraculous, les aventures de Ladybug et Chat Noir	Miraculous: Tales of Ladybug & Cat Noir	2015–present	Zagtoon	A superhero show focusing on two Paris teenage superheroes – Marinette Dupain-Cheng aka Ladybug and Adrien Agreste aka Cat Noir ("Chat Noir" in the original French dub); they protect Paris from a mysterious villain named Hawk Moth ("Le Papillon", lit "The Butterfly", in the original French dub), who has the power to turn any civilian into a supervillain if they have a bad day using akumas (literally "devil"), butterflies infused with dark energy.	CGI
Pixie Girl	N/A	TBA	Zagtoon	A spunky, adventurous Pixie and her awestruck human friend explore New York City while battling the tyrannical rule of the city’s evil wytches, who scheme to forever cast away the city’s ties to pixies and the purity of nature.	CGI
Pyjamasques	PJ Masks	2015–2024	TeamTO	Three 6-year-old friends, Connor, Amaya and Greg, lead regular lives during the day, but at night they transform into superheroes and have amazing adventures.	CGI
SamSam	N/A	2007	Bayard Jeunesse	SamSam is considered the smallest superhero. He does not know properly how to use his powers. He flies his SamSaucer into space to deal with space pirates or King Marthy. He receives assistance from SamTeddy, SamMummy and SamDaddy.	CGI
Samurai Rabbit: The Usagi Chronicles	N/A	2022	Gaumont Animation	Samurai Rabbit: The Usagi Chronicles takes place in the far future and will center on rabbit teenager Yuichi, who is the descendant of Miyamoto Usagi, and his group of eccentric companions.	CGI

== Supernatural/Sci-fi ==
Original title in France	English title (or literal meaning)	Year	Studio	Summary	Technique
Atomic Betty	N/A	2004–2008	Tele Images Productions	Betty Barrett is a typical 12-year-old girl who enjoys school, daydreaming about living in outer space, sci-fi movies, and singing in her musical band, living in Moose Jaw Heights (a fictional suburb of Moose Jaw, Saskatchewan).	Digital
Les Chumballs	Chumballs	2009	Ellipsanime	On an environmentally ruined Earth, Solana, Stel, Tom, and their robot Tago travel outside their underground home to reactivate the Chumballs, robots that restore Earth's environments.	Traditional
Code Lyoko	N/A	2003–2007	Moonscoop	A computer prodigy, Jeremie Belpois, and his three best friends must enter a virtual world called Lyoko inside a quantum supercomputer in order to fight a malevolent artificial intelligence/multi-agent system named X.A.N.A. who is bent on dominating the real world, all while helping a virtual humanoid being named Aelita from falling prey to the multi-agent system's schemes, who lives on Lyoko, to be successfully materialized into the real world.	Traditional 2D/CGI
Cosmic Quantum Ray	N/A	2007–2008	Moonscoop	Robbie Shipton has a shoe box leading to the ninth dimension, home of Quantum Ray. Together with Team Quantum, Robbie is taking on bad guys spread over the whole universe, but also goes to school.	CGI
Galactik Football	N/A	2006–2010	Gaumont	With magical powers, The Snow Kids are a group of teenagers who formed a team of intergalactic players in order to compete in Galactik Football	Traditional
Hero: 108		2010–2012	Moonscoop	A long time ago humans and animals lived together in harmony. But a wicked wizard named High Roller controlled 2 animals and tricked the other animals into thinking that humans were their enemies. Chaos reigned until a group of warriors, Lin Chung, Jumpy Ghostface, Mystique Sonia, Commander ApeTrully, Mr. No Hands, and Mighty Ray, had joined forces to end the war.	Digital
Kosmik Wrestle: Space League	N/A	TBA	Zagtoon	When an intergalactic champion wrestling coach comes calling, the ambitious, 12-year- old wrestling-fanatic, Frog Legs, is ready for action. Further emboldened by learning of his family’s deep roots in the Galaktik Wrestling Federation (GWF), he embarks on a crash course training regimen and commences a long, bruise-riddled journey to defeat champions from all planets, with the goal of becoming the best wrestler in the galaxy.	CGI
Ōban Star-Racers	N/A	2006	Sav! The World	In the year 2082, Earth has been invited to compete in the Great Race of Ōban, an intergalactic race competition whose winner can be given "The Ultimate Prize", supposedly granting any wish in the world – even bringing back a loved one.	Traditional / CGI
Power Ball	N/A	2020	Gaumont	An ancient evil threatens Planet Earth and 12-year-old Storm Curtis is the only one who has the power to summon Earth"s defenses. Using the force of the earth"s Underground Sun, he is thrown into an epic duel! Storm will answer the call of destiny, learn about team spirit and face the ups and downs of communal living – not so easy sharing the bathroom with a monkey! Get ready for Football like you"ve never seen before.	CGI
Il était une fois… l'Espace	Once Upon a Time... Space	1982	Procidis	The second Il était une fois... (Once Upon a Time...) series. Most of the characters are the same as in the previous series but there is more of a focus on female characters than before. This time the story is set in space and is about an interplanetary struggle. There are some educational elements but less than in the series' predecessor, Il était une fois... l'homme.	Traditional
Les mondes engloutis	Spartakus and the Sun Beneath the Sea (lit. The Engulfed Worlds)	1985–1987	Moonscoop	An underground civilization named Arkadia launches an expedition for exploring the world of the surface to restore its fading sun.	Traditional
Power Players	N/A	2019–2020	Zagtoon	A young boy who gains the powers to turn from human a living toy must protect his bracelets, which give him his powers, from the hands of evil, toys come to life.	CGI
Robo Story	N/A	1985		A girl and her dog wind up on a planet inhabited by robots.	Traditional
Robotboy	N/A	2005–2008	Alphanim	Fearing an attack, Professor Moshimo entrusts Robotboy, a heroic fighting robot, to 10-year-old Tommy Turnbull and his friends.	Digital
Sonic le rebelle	Sonic Underground (lit. Sonic the rebel)	1999	DIC Productions, L.P. Les Studios Tex	In a universe that is parallel to other Sonic the Hedgehog stories, Mobius is taken over by Dr. Robotnik. Its ruler is forced to conceal herself and hide her children, Sonic, Sonia and Manic, in three separate homes. Years later, an oracle reveals the siblings' true identity to them and they set out to find their mother and defeat Robotnik. As weapons they have their amulets which can turn into musical instruments and can be used as laser guns.	Traditional
Sonic Boom	N/A	2014–2017	Technicolor Animation Productions	Sonic, Tails, Knuckles, Amy and Sticks reside on Seaside Island in Hedgehog Village, formerly Unnamed Village. Together, they defend the island from various threats like Doctor Eggman and his robotic creations.	CGI
Stargate: Le Dessin Anime	Stargate Infinity	2002	DIC	5 crew members are prevented from coming back home and must use the Stargate network to do so.	Traditional
Tara Duncan	Tara Duncan: The Evil Empress	2011	Moonscoop Group	Very loosely based on the first novel of the fourteen-novel series of the same name. It was cancelled after its twenty-sixth episode "The Naughty Little Vampire."	Digital
Team DroniX	N/A	2019–present	Technicolor Animation Productions	A group of teenage drone enthusiasts use their skills to build a powerful drone, named Dronix, to compete in school competitions and use their drone for good whenever possible	CGI
Time Jam: Valerian & Laureline	N/A	2007–2008	Dargaud	Set in a utopian future where time travel is possible, the show follows two futuristic spatio-temporal French special agents who protect time and space from time travel-related paradoxes.	Traditional
Zak Storm	Zak Storm: Super Pirate	2016–2018	Zagtoon	When teenager Zak Storm takes his father's necklace and goes surfing, he is suddenly sucked by a giant wave and ends up in the Bermuda Triangle where he is picked up by a sentient pirate ship called the Chaos with a talking sword named Calabrass. He discovers that the necklace contains a gem called the Eye of Beru, which gives him special powers, and that in order to return home, he needs to become the captain of the Chaos and unite the Seven Seas. He assembles a band of misfits: a ghost boy, an Atlantean princess, a Viking, and a space alien.	CGI
Les Zinzins de l'Espace	Space Goofs	1997–2006	Gaumont	Five extraterrestrials from the fictitious planet Zigma B, Candy H. Caramella, Etno Polino, Bud Budiovitch, Gorgeous Klatoo and Stereo Monovici go on a picnic together in space. However, their spaceship crashes into an asteroid, and they fall to planet Earth. They realize that if any human finds out that they are aliens, they could be captured and experimented on by scientists, so they take shelter in the attic of a house that is up for rent.	Traditional

== Western ==
Original title in France	English title (or literal meaning)	Year	Studio	Summary	Technique
Les Nouvelles Aventures de Lucky Luke	The New Adventures of Lucky Luke	2001–2003	Xilam	Based on the comic book series by Belgian artist Morris. Lucky Luke, the sharpshooting cowboy who draws faster than his own shadow, keeps desperadoes like The Daltons, Billy the Kid and Jesse James in check.	Traditional
The Legend of Calamity Jane	N/A	1997–1998	Contre Allée		Traditional

== See also ==
- List of French television series
- Culture of France
