= OUAT =

OUAT may refer to:

- Once Upon a Time (disambiguation)
- Orissa University of Agriculture and Technology, a public Indian agricultural university
- Once Upon a Time (TV series)
