= Once Upon a Time... The Objects =

French-Israeli-Swiss-Bulgarian animated children's television series

- French: Il était une fois... ces Drôles d'objets
- Genre: Edutainment
- Based on: Once Upon a Time by Albert Barillé
- Directed by: Luc Vinciguerra
- Countries of origin: France; Israel; Switzerland; Bulgaria
- Original language: French
- No. of episodes: 78

Production
- Running time: 7 minutes
- Production companies: Procidis; Samka Productions; Sklan & ka; Studio Zmei; France Télévisions; Hot; TV5Monde; Radio Télévision Suisse

Original release
- Network: RTS 1 Okoo
- Release: 30 December 2023 – present

Related
- Once Upon a Time... Planet Earth (2008)

Once Upon a Time... The Objects (French: Il était une fois... ces Drôles d'objets) is an educational animated television series. It is the eighth series in the Once Upon a Time... franchise. The series reprises the characters from its predecessors created by Albert Barillé. Each seven-minute episode explains the history of an everyday object in a format adapted for children.

The series was produced by French studios Procidis and Samka Productions in co-production with Sklan & ka, Studio Zmei, France Télévisions, Hot, TV5Monde, Radio Télévision Suisse (RTS), and the Centre national de la cinématographie. The series premiered in Switzerland on RTS 1, starting on 30 December 2023, and it was subsequently broadcast on the channels of the rest of the broadcasters that participated in the production.
