= Once Upon a Time... Planet Earth =

- DVD box set cover art
- Created by: Albert Barillé
- Voices of: Roger Carel; Annie Balestra; Olivier Destrez; Alain Dorval
- Country of origin: France
- No. of episodes: 26

Production
- Running time: 25 minutes
- Production companies: Procidis; France 3; Centre National de la Cinematographie; Directorate-General for Research; European Broadcasting Union

Original release
- Network: France 3
- Release: 22 December 2008

Related
- Once Upon a Time... The Explorers (1996); Once Upon a Time... The Objects (2023)

Once Upon a Time... Planet Earth (French: Il était une fois... notre Terre) is a children's television educational animated series directed by Albert Barillé. It is the seventh series in the Once Upon a Time... franchise.

The series was produced by Procidis and France 3 with the support of the Centre National de la Cinematographie, the Directorate-General for Research of the European Commission and the European Broadcasting Union (EBU). The series was initially broadcast since 22 December 2008 on France 3. Its original premise was set up from "Once Upon a Time... the Earth (and Tomorrow?)", the final episode of the first series Once Upon a Time... Man, thus finally going back to the beginning where it all started and ended. The series' premiere also coincided with the 30th anniversary milestone of the franchise.

== Episodes ==
1. Planet guards
2. Climate I: Far North
3. Water in India
4. Water in Sahel
5. Amazon forest
6. Energies exhaustion
7. Fair trade
8. Oceans in danger
9. Ecosystems
10. Water of the World
11. Poverty
12. Forests of the world
13. Excessive fishing
14. Climate II: Origins
15. Farming
16. Biodiversity
17. Climate III: Effects
18. Recycling
19. Women of the World
20. Children's labour
21. New energies
22. House and city
23. Climate IV: Solutions
24. Children: Health and Education
25. Technologies
26. Tomorrow

== Voices ==
- Roger Carel : Maestro
- Annie Balestra : Pierrette, Psi
- Olivier Destrez : Pierrot

== Broadcast information ==
Country	Television broadcasts
France	France 3 *, Gulli *, Unis
Canada	CBC Television, Télévision de Radio-Canada, Fairchild TV (Cantonese)
Israel	Logi
Indonesia	SPT (Indonesia) *, SPTI
Spain	Televisión Española (TVE) *
Germany	WDR *, SWR *, rbb *
Austria	ORF
Italy	Italia 1 *
Switzerland	TSR (French) *, RTSI (Italian) *
Belgium	RTBF *
Poland	Telewizja Polska (TVP), TV Puls
Portugal	RTP
Sweden	Sveriges Television (SVT)
Finland	Fox Broadcasting Company, Subtv Juniori
Republic of Ireland	RTÉ
United States of America	PBS
Iceland	Sjónvarpið
Turkey	Kanal D
Hungary	Minimax, Da Vinci Learning
Hong Kong	TVB
Croatia	RTL KOCKICA, Da Vinci Learning
Qatar	Jeem TV
Russia	Карусель *

* Contributing co-producer
