= Albert Barillé =

French television producer

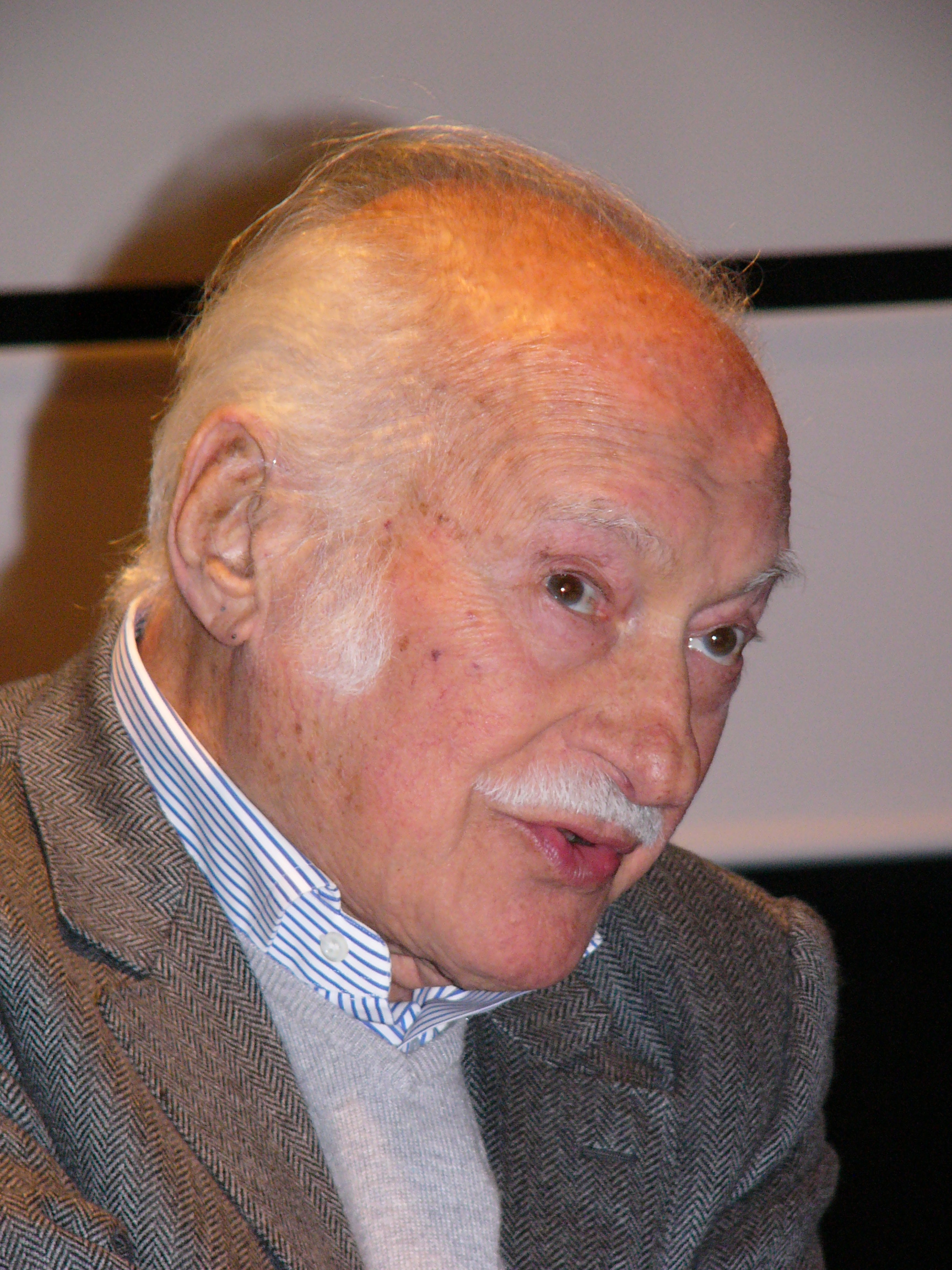
- Born: 14 February 1920; Warsaw, Poland
- Died: 5 February 2009 (aged 88); Neuilly-sur-Seine, France

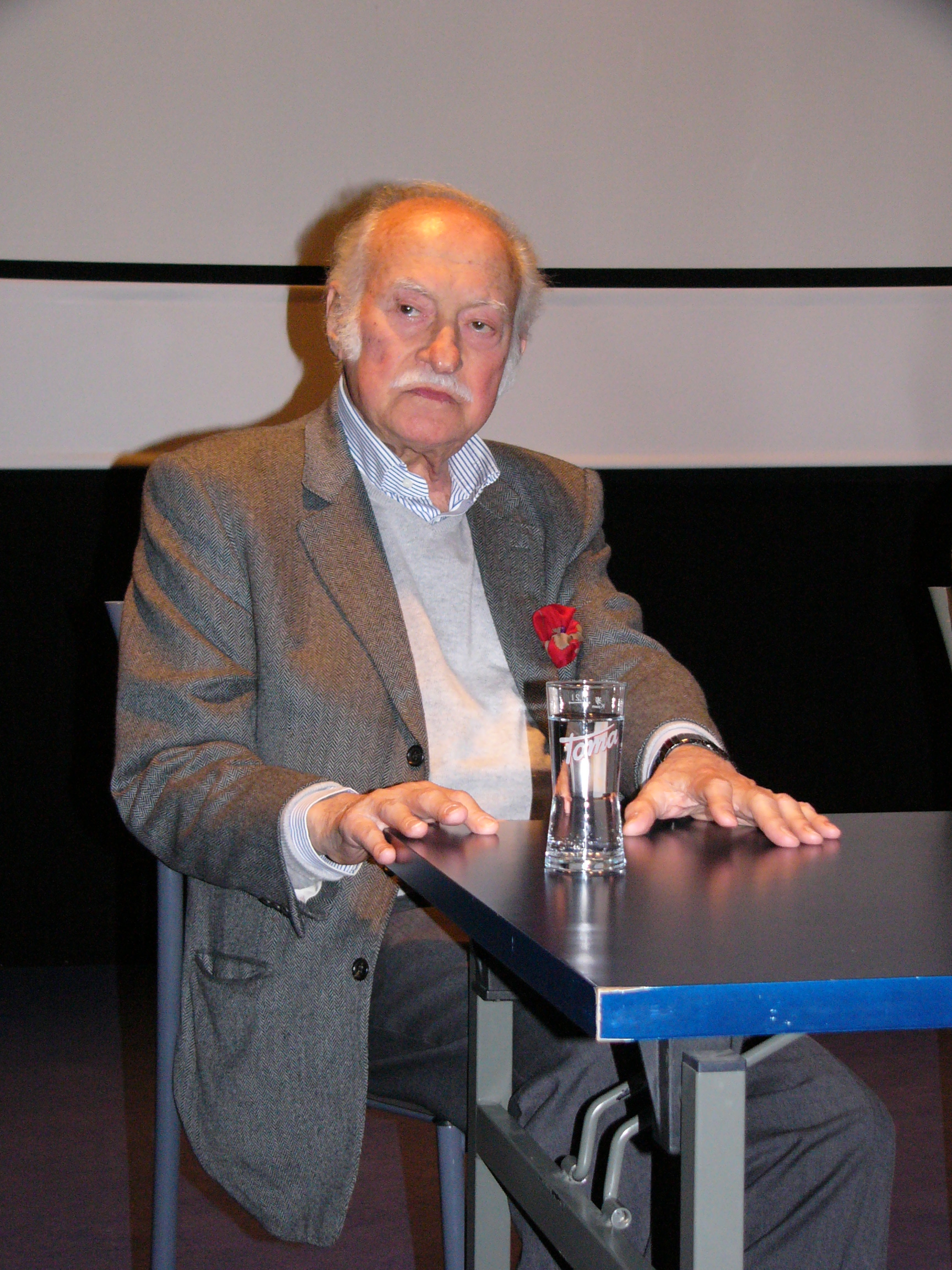
Albert Barillé in 2007, two years before his death.

Albert Barillé (14 February 1920 – 5 February 2009) was a Polish-born French television producer, creator, screenwriter, cartoonist, and founder of Procidis. He is the creator of the stop-motion animated series Les Aventures de Colargol, and the series Once Upon a Time.... He was also an author of medical documentaries, theater pieces, and popularized philosophy.

== Filmography ==
- Les Aventures de Colargol (1970)
- Once Upon a Time...
- Once Upon a Time... Man (1978)
- Once Upon a Time... Space (1982)
- Once Upon a Time... Life (1987)
- Once Upon a Time... The Americas (1992)
- Once Upon a Time... The Discoverers (1994)
- Once Upon a Time... The Explorers (1996)
- Once Upon a Time... Planet Earth (2008)

== See also ==
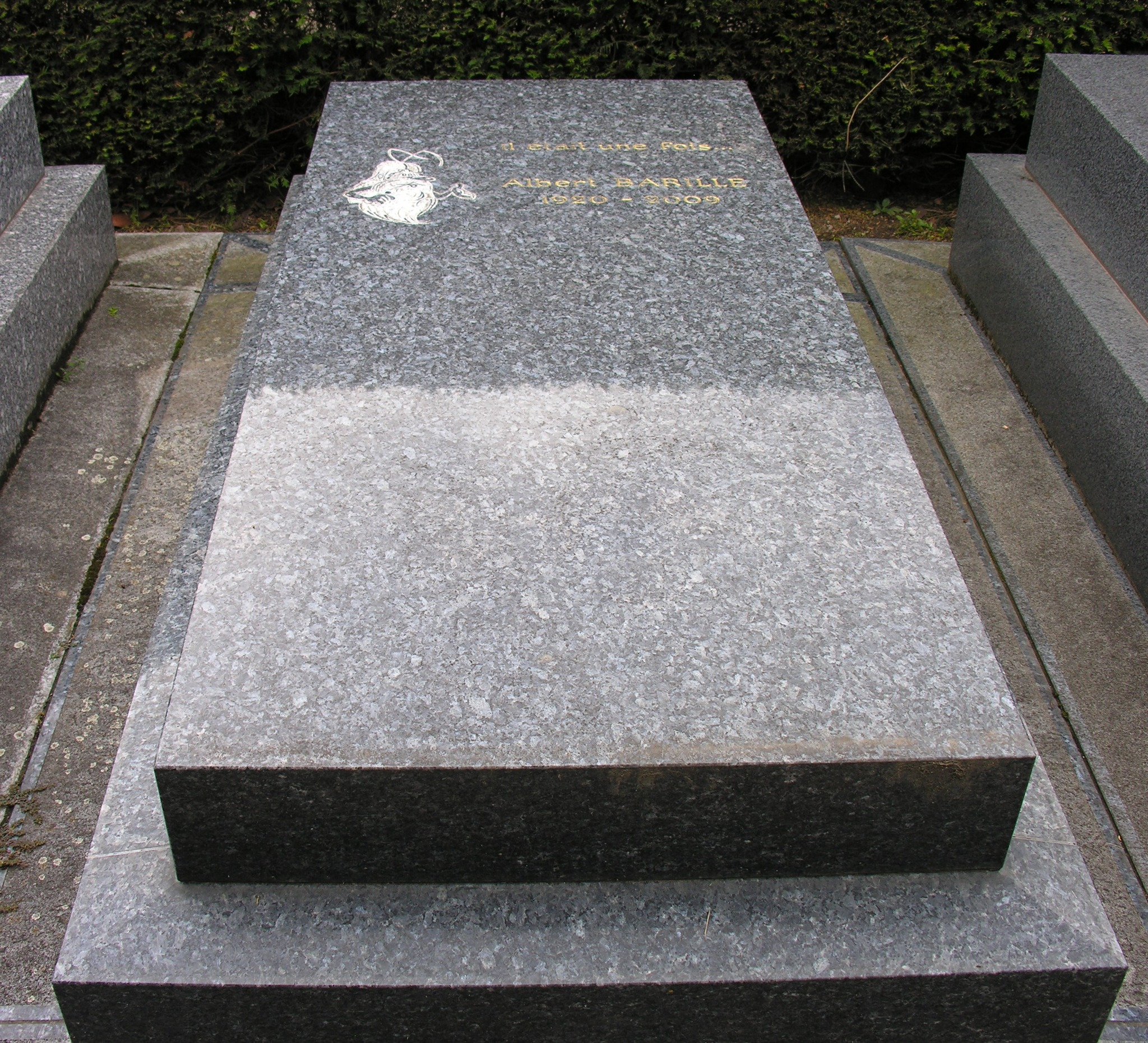
- Albert Barillé's grave
  Wild Instinct

== Honours and awards ==
- Chevalier of the Ordre des Arts et des Lettres
