= Once Upon a Time... Life =

Educational animated television series (1987–1988)

- DVD box set cover art
- French: Il était une fois... La vie
- Genre: Edutainment; Animation
- Created by: Albert Barillé
- Voices of: Roger Carel; Marie-Laure Beneston; Gilles Laurent; Gilles Tamiz; Alain Dorval
- Composer: Michel Legrand
- Countries of origin: List: France; Belgium; Canada; Japan; Netherlands; Spain; Switzerland
- Original language: French
- No. of episodes: 26

Production
- Running time: 26 minutes
- Production companies: List: Procidis; FR3; Canal+; Société Radio-Canada; Televisión Española; Katholieke Radio Omroep; Radio Télévision Suisse Romande; Radiotelevisione della Svizzera Italiana; Radio-télévision belge de la Communauté française; Belgische Radio en Televisie Nederlandse Uitzendingen; Eiken

Original release
- Network: Canal+
- Release: 10 December 1986 – 3 June 1987

Related
- Once Upon a Time... Space (1982); Once Upon a Time... The Americas (1991)

Once Upon a Time... Life (French: Il était une fois... La vie) (Note: Known in Japan as The Science of Life: Micro Patrol (Japanese: 生命の科学ミクロパトロール, Hepburn: Seimei no Kagaku: Mikuro Patorōru)) is an educational animated television series created and directed by Albert Barillé. It is the third series in the Once Upon a Time... franchise. It reprises the main characters from its predecessors, Once Upon a Time... Man and Once Upon a Time... Space, and adapts them into a physiology context, talking about the human body and its functions in a simplified and educational way. The series consists of 26 episodes.

The series was produced by French studio Procidis in co-production with FR3 and Canal+ (France), Société Radio-Canada (Canada), Televisión Española (TVE, Spain), Katholieke Radio Omroep (KRO, Netherlands), Radio Télévision Suisse Romande and Radiotelevisione della Svizzera Italiana (Switzerland), Radio-télévision belge de la Communauté française and Belgische Radio en Televisie Nederlandse Uitzendingen (RTBF and BRT, Belgium), and Eiken (Japan) who was the one who made the animation. The series premiered in France on Canal+, between 10 December 1986 and 3 June 1987, and it was subsequently broadcast on the channels of the rest of the broadcasters that participated in the production dubbed into their own language.

This is the second collaboration between Procidis and the Japanese studio Eiken subsequent to Once Upon a Time... Space but, unlike the previous series, this was never aired on television in Japan but instead was released on VHS in 1991.

== Overview ==
Once Upon a Time... Life brought back the edutainment formula established in Man but had been left out on Space. The series combined entertaining story lines with factual information, presented metaphorically.

The series used the same recurring lead characters as the other series in the Once Upon a Time... franchise: certain represent the cells that make up the body's systems and defense mechanisms, such as red blood cells, white blood cells and platelets, while antagonists represent viruses and bacteria that threaten to attack the human body. Every episode of the series featured a different organ or system within the human body (like the brain, the heart, the circulatory system, etc.).

In addition to its countries of origin, the series was also aired in the Arab states of the Persian Gulf, Armenia, Australia, Austria, Brazil, Bulgaria, Croatia, Czechoslovakia, Denmark, Finland, Germany, Greece, Haiti, Hungary, Iceland, Ireland, Israel, Italy, Jordan, Kenya, Lebanon, Liechtenstein, Mauritius, Mexico, Morocco, Netherlands, New Zealand, Norway, Poland, Portugal, Romania, the Soviet Union, Seychelles, Singapore, Slovakia, Slovenia, South Africa, South Korea, Sweden, Syria, Taiwan, Tunisia, Thailand, Turkey, the United Kingdom, Venezuela, Yugoslavia, and Zimbabwe.

== Music ==
The main theme music and instrumental score for the series as a whole were composed by Michel Legrand, his second work for the Once Upon a Time... series.

=== Theme music and song ===
The opening theme song "Hymne à la Vie" (lit. '"Hymn for Life"') was performed in the original French-language version by Sandra Kim, winner of the Eurovision Song Contest 1986. The song was released as a single in 1986 by Carrere Records (14.148). Its lyrics were later translated for the English-language dub, retitled "This Life is Life, That's Life!".

=== Score ===
A soundtrack album collecting all the incidental music of the series was released in 2001 by Loga-Rythme (LR-677005) as a part of the Anime Classique range.

==== Track listing ====
All music is composed by Michel Legrand.

| No. | Title | Length |
|---|---|---|
| 1. | "Hymne à la Vie (vocals by Sandra Kim)" | 2:19 |
| 2. | "La Circulation Sanguine" | 3:39 |
| 3. | "Un Peu d'Oxygène!" | 2:31 |
| 4. | "Le Circuit des Aliments" | 1:10 |
| 5. | "Petite Visite du Corps Humain" | 4:40 |
| 6. | "Les Plaquettes" | 3:09 |
| 7. | "Thème Principal - Hymne à la Vie" | 2:50 |
| 8. | "La Naissance" | 1:59 |
| 9. | "Les Chaînes de la Vie" | 2:49 |
| 10. | "Assembler l'ADN" | 2:20 |
| 11. | "Les Macrophages" | 3:22 |
| 12. | "Le Coeur" | 2:56 |
| 13. | "Ainsi va la Vie..." | 2:27 |
| 14. | "Les Brigades du Corps" | 1:16 |
| 15. | "Près du Tympan" | 4:21 |
| 16. | "L'Oreille" | 3:11 |
| 17. | "Maitre Globus" | 2:26 |
| 18. | "Maman Pierrette" | 1:24 |
| 19. | "Les Conseils de Psi" | 2:04 |
| 20. | "Les Lymphocytes en Action" | 0:23 |
| 21. | "Bébé Grandit" | 1:13 |
| 22. | "Le Foie" | 1:56 |
| 23. | "La Digestion" | 0:56 |
| 24. | "Entretenir Son Corps" | 1:12 |
| 25. | "L'Oeil" | 1:37 |
| 26. | "Les Hormones" | 2:14 |
| 27. | "La Respiration" | 2:46 |
| Total length: | | 63:25 |

== Characters ==
The series makes use of recurring human characters originally from both Once Upon a Time... Man and Once Upon a Time... Space. Every character in the series appeared as a real person (the old intelligent doctor, the dedicated blonde mother, the boy and the girl, their obese friend, and the pair of bullies) and anthropomorphic representations of cells and cellular functions within the human body.

- The manager of the brain – represented by Maestro, the bearded old man.
- The manager of the cell nucleus – represented by Maestro, usually asleep in his chair.
- Enzymes – The human body's workmen, shown usually as a man in a bib overall and a baseball-type cap.
  - Digestive enzymes – Works of digestion. Some enzymes are shown as female and most as male. The females are only seen in the stomach. The males appear in the stomach and small intestine.
- Hormones – messengers for the body, represented as humanoid robotic outboard motors spray-painted according to function; those representing thyroxine are given life by iodine. These hormones are all female.
- Red blood cells – represented by red humanoids. Most notable is elderly Professor Globus, who tells a lot about how the body works; he is accompanied by dimwitted big boy called Hemo; and his inquisitive and mischievous friend Globin. They can be pink colored when they carry oxygen bubbles or carbon dioxide bubbles in a back pouch, becoming dark red when carrying carbon dioxide.
- Neurotransmitters – The blue speedy guys that can deliver messages as papers or passengers through nerves and stations. They are mostly running anytime on delivery, and pick up or drop off passenger times until they reach the end.
- Platelets – represented as red disks with a face, legs and four arms.
- White blood cells – The body's police force.
  - Neutrophil granulocytes – represented by foot-patrol "policemen" which are completely white in color, and wear a yellow star badge. They carry batons and swallow any bacterias that they find. They can clone themselves. Most of the time they function as traffic cops. Their commander is the same but with a Caucasian head, and is named Jumbo or Jumbo Junior.
  - Lymphocytes – represented by:
    - Lymphocytes B – as marshals in a small one-man round flying craft with two aimable side-mounted hydrojet propulsors; two of them are a version of Peter and Psi (named Captain Peter and Lieutenant Claire). Some other (unnamed) B cell pilot characters each appear more than once, for example a spotty-faced teenage boy. They can drop antibodies from an underbelly bomb bay. They can multiplicate themselves through mitosis duplicating the craft and the pilot. Their uniforms are very light blue with shoulder pads. (Those uniforms appear in the outside world in a few futuristic scenes as astronaut uniforms/undersuits.)
    - Lymphocytes T – the same sort of craft but with a large uppercase T on the underbelly at the bow. They can discharge a purple smoke that kills bacteria and cancer cells.
  - Phagocyte – hovering spherical craft with several large suction tubes coming out of them. A pilot's head can be seen through a small canopy on top. They can engulf bacteria.
  - Basophils – plump women with body like granulocytes, who instead of swallow bacterias carry a basket of "histamine grenades" and throw them to attack toxins.
  - Macrophages – (a big yellow ground vehicles shaped like frog heads with a big front scoop grab and three wheels; each "eye" is a small canopy revealing a pilot's head), "the cleaning services of the body". Most of the time they function by removing the body' waste and during emergency times they phagocyte bacteria and viruses.
  - Immature leucocytes: teenage humanoids with the same uniform as the lymphocyte B pilots: seen in the thymus, which is represented as a police training college. In the Bone Marrow episode, some of them are shown to become rebellious and destructive, attacking other members of the body due to Leukemia.
- The antibodies – a small white insectoid characters which after being launched at infectious agents, fly around the bacteria or viruses and paralyze them. Their commander is named Metro. A variant of them, wearing fake large noses and carrying a fencing foil, are specialized in fighting thetanus toxins.
- The Pathogens are the main antagonists of the series. They are the characters that make people sick. The other antagonists are the Immature leukocytes in Bone Marrow,
  - The bacteria (represented as blue bullies) – the big bully. Mostly blue in color.
  - The viruses (represented as yellow worms with hands) – the smaller bully. Mostly yellow in color.
- Organic molecules, which are represented in two cases as characters.
  - Fats/Fatty acids: Represented as fat yellow ponies.
  - Proteins: Represented as a tall, strong, and muscular orange character in overalls with some doglike features.
  - Sugars: Small green-and-purple hexagons and pentagons. Sometimes appear as candylike characters.
  - Amino acids: Similar appearance to antibodies, generally invisible until the episode dealing with protein synthesis.
  - DNA/RNA: Represented quite accurately and in detail when explaining protein synthesis.
  - Vitamins: Represented as colored living letters. As seen in the lymphatic system, P is present but rarely.
  - Cholesterol: Yellow seal-like characters that can block a passage of a blood vessel. As seen in "The liver factory", the cholesterol accumulated around Jumbo, blocking the passage of the red blood cells in the blood vessel.
- Gall/Bile : Blue-green-colored liquid that makes the fats shrink, as seen in "The digestion".

The series describes a "society inside the body" with a strong pyramidal stratification of work.

== Episodes ==
| No. | Title | Original release date |
|---|---|---|
| 1 | "The Cell Planet" (La planète cellule) | 10 December 1986 |
On the cells and the DNA.
| 2 | "Birth" (La naissance) | 17 December 1986 |
On the reproductive system, pregnancy, and birth.
| 3 | "The Body's Sentinels" (Les sentinelles du corps) | 24 December 1986 |
On the white blood cells and the immune system.
| 4 | "The Bone Marrow" (La moelle osseuse) | 31 December 1986 |
On the bone marrow and the haematopoietic system.
| 5 | "The Blood" (Le sang) | 7 January 1987 |
On the blood and the circulatory system.
| 6 | "The Tiny Platelets" (Les petites plaquettes) | 14 January 1987 |
On the platelets and the hemostasis.
| 7 | "The Heart" (Le cœur) | 21 January 1987 |
On the heart.
| 8 | "Breathing" (La respiration) | 28 January 1987 |
On the respiratory system.
| 9 | "The Brain" (Le cerveau) | 4 February 1987 |
On the brain.
| 10 | "The Neurones" (Les neurones) | 11 February 1987 |
On the neurones and the nervous system.
| 11 | "The Eye" (L'œil) | 18 February 1987 |
On the eye and the visual system.
| 12 | "The Ear" (L'oreille) | 25 February 1987 |
On the ear, the hearing, and the vestibular system.
| 13 | "The Skin" (La peau) | 4 March 1987 |
On the skin and the integumentary system.
| 14 | "The Mouth and the Teeth" (La bouche et les dents) | 11 March 1987 |
On the mouth and the teeth.
| 15 | "The Digestion" (La digestion) | 18 March 1987 |
On the digestive system.
| 16 | "The Liver Factory" (L'usine du foie) | 25 March 1987 |
On the liver.
| 17 | "The Kidneys" (Les reins) | 1 April 1987 |
On the kidneys and the urinary system.
| 18 | "The Lymphatic System" (Le système lymphatique) | 8 April 1987 |
On the lymphatic system.
| 19 | "The Bones and the Skeleton" (Les os et le squelette) | 15 April 1987 |
On the bones and the skeleton.
| 20 | "The Muscles and the Fat" (Les muscles et la graisse) | 22 April 1987 |
On the muscular system and the fat.
| 21 | "Toxin Wars" (Guerre aux toxines) | 29 April 1987 |
On the microbes and the antibodies.
| 22 | "The Vaccination" (La vaccination) | 6 May 1987 |
On the vaccination and immunization.
| 23 | "The Hormones" (Les hormones) | 13 May 1987 |
On the hormones and the endocrine system.
| 24 | "The Chain of Life" (Les chaînes de la vie) | 20 May 1987 |
On the food chain.
| 25 | "Repairs and Changes" (Réparations et transformations) | 27 May 1987 |
On regeneration.
| 26 | "And Life Goes On" (Et la vie va...) | 3 June 1987 |
On ageing and death.

== Regional home-video releases ==
In some English-language versions, the title is rendered as "Once Upon a Time – Life" in the opening credits.

A partwork version called How My Body Works was produced for the United Kingdom in 50 hardback volumes, each with about 30 A4-sized pages, described as "an Orbis play & learn collection". In it, some of the characters have different names: The Professor for the Maestro; Captain Courageous and Ace for the lymphocyte B crafts' pilots; Plasmus and Globina for Hemo and Globin, Corpo for Jumbo; Toxicus, Germus and Infectius for the bacterium characters; Virulus for the virus character. VHS copies of the English-language television episodes were included with issues.

A DVD box set of all the episodes of the series was produced by Procidis, and distributed locally by various distributors. The DVD series was produced in French, English, Polish, Finnish, German, Italian, Hebrew, Norwegian, Hungarian, Dutch and Swedish, but was not released in the United Kingdom. In 2011, the DVD box set was available in English in Canada, distributed by Imavision.

Full episodes are available on Youtube.

== Biological accuracy ==
Most biological terminology is translated with care, but a few mistakes were made and there are some anachronisms.

- The heart chamber now known as the atrium is called the "auricle" in episode 7, a term correct at the time of production, but which is now used for another structure in the heart.
- In episode 4, "Pulmonary aorta" is used for "pulmonary artery", which is a mistake because unlike fish, humans do not have two aortae.
- More inaccuracies include complete lack of antigen presenting cell activity (by Macrophages, B-cells and Dendritic cells) in order to trigger the adaptive immune system according to MHCII complex. Though it is mentioned that antibodies need to be specific to the disease's pathogen, the way that specificity is obtained is not shown. Also, some aspects of the immune system are not portrayed, like the complement system.
- In episode 11, it is explained that lysosomes are found in tears to protect and clean the eye surface, but the correct term are the lysozymes.
- In episode 13, when professor Globus explains the receptors of the skin, the Meissner's corpuscle is mentioned as Golgi corpuscle, a cell organelle responsible for protein transportation.

== See also ==
- List of French animated television series
- List of French television series
- Body Troopers, a 1996 Norwegian children's film with a similar premise
- Osmosis Jones, a 2001 American film with a similar premise
- Cells at Work!, a 2015 manga series with a similar premise
- Fantastic Voyage
- Innerspace
