= Once Upon a Time... The Discoverers =

French animated television series

- DVD box set cover art
- French: Il était une fois... les Découvreurs
- Created by: Albert Barillé
- Voices of: Roger Carel; Olivier Destrez; Marie-Laure Beneston; Patrick Préjean; Sady Rebbot
- Countries of origin: List: France; Belgium; Finland; Germany; Italy; Spain; Switzerland
- No. of episodes: 26

Production
- Running time: 26 minutes
- Production companies: List: Procidis; FR3; Canal+; Televisión Española; Westdeutscher Rundfunk; Südwestrundfunk; Reteitalia; Radio Télévision Suisse Romande; Radiotelevisione della Svizzera Italiana; Radio-télévision belge de la Communauté française; Oy. Yleisradio Ab.; Centre national de la cinématographie

Original release
- Network: Canal+
- Release: 3 January – 5 September 1994

Related
- Once Upon a Time... The Americas (1991); Once Upon a Time... The Explorers (1996)

Once Upon a Time... The Discoverers (French: Il était une fois... les Découvreurs) is an educational animated television series created and directed by Albert Barillé. It is the fifth series in the Once Upon a Time... franchise.

The series was produced by French studio Procidis in co-production with FR3 and Canal+ (France), Televisión Española (TVE, Spain), Westdeutscher Rundfunk and Südwestrundfunk (WDR and SWR, Germany), Reteitalia (Italy), Radio Télévision Suisse Romande and Radiotelevisione della Svizzera Italiana (RTSR and RTSI, Switzerland), Radio-télévision belge de la Communauté française (RTBF, Belgium), Oy. Yleisradio Ab. (Yle, Finland), and the French Centre national de la cinématographie. The series premiered in France on Canal+, between 3 January and 5 September 1994, and it was subsequently broadcast on the channels of the rest of the broadcasters that participated in the production dubbed into their own language.

The series aired in the United States on the History Channel starting in April 1995.

== Episodes ==
1. The Chinese, our Ancestors
2. Archimedes and the Greek
3. Hero of Alexandria
4. The Measuring of Time
5. Henry the Navigator and Cartography
6. Johannes Gutenberg and Printing
7. Leonardo da Vinci, a Jack-of-all-trades
8. The Doctors (Paracelsus, Andreas Vesalius, Ambroise Paré, etc.)
9. Galileo Galilei
10. Isaac Newton
11. Comte de Buffon (Discovering the Past)
12. Antoine Lavoisier and Chemistry
13. George Stephenson, Full Steam Ahead!
14. Michael Faraday and Electricity
15. Charles Darwin and Evolution
16. Gregor Mendel and Peas
17. Louis Pasteur and Micro-organisms
18. Thomas Edison and Applied Science
19. Guglielmo Marconi and Sound Waves
20. Henry Ford and the Adventure of Motorcar
21. Aviation (Otto Lilienthal, Wright brothers, etc.)
22. Marie Curie
23. Albert Einstein
24. Konrad Lorenz, Father of the Geese
25. Neil Armstrong, the Moon and the Space
26. Tomorrow?

== Broadcast information ==
Country	Television broadcasts
France	France 3 * Canal+ *
Canada	CBC Television, Télévision de Radio-Canada
Spain	Televisión Española (TVE) *
Germany	WDR *, SWF *
Austria	ORF
Italy	Italia 1 *, Cartoon Network
Greece	ERT Cine+
Indonesia	STOON (Indonesia) *, STOON I
Switzerland	TSR (French) *, RTSI (Italian) *
Belgium	RTBF
Poland	Telewizja Polska (TVP), TV Puls
Portugal	RTP
Sweden	Sveriges Television (SVT)
Finland	Yle *
Hungary	Magyar Televízió, Minimax, Da Vinci Learning
Republic of Ireland	RTÉ
United States of America	PBS
Iceland	Sjónvarpið
Israel	Logi
Russia	Culture
Serbia	RTS

* Contributing co-producer

== See also ==
- List of French animated television series
