= Once Upon a Time... The Explorers =

French animated television series

- DVD box set cover art
- French: Il était une fois... les Explorateurs
- Created by: Albert Barillé
- Voices of: Roger Carel; Olivier Destrez; Hélène Levesque; Patrick Préjean; Daniel Beretta
- Countries of origin: List: France; Belgium; Germany; Italy; Spain; Switzerland
- No. of episodes: 26

Production
- Running time: 26 minutes
- Production companies: List: Procidis; FR3; Canal+; Televisión Española; Westdeutscher Rundfunk; Südwestrundfunk; Sender Freies Berlin; Mediaset; Radio Télévision Suisse Romande; Radiotelevisione della Svizzera Italiana; Radio-télévision belge de la Communauté française; Centre national de la cinématographie

Original release
- Network: Canal+
- Release: 10 December 1996 – 1997

Related
- Once Upon a Time... The Discoverers (1994); Once Upon a Time... Planet Earth (2008)

Once Upon a Time... The Explorers (French: Il était une fois... les Explorateurs) is an educational animated television series created and directed by Albert Barillé. It is the sixth series in the Once Upon a Time... franchise.

The series was produced by French studio Procidis in co-production with FR3 and Canal+ (France), Televisión Española (TVE, Spain), Westdeutscher Rundfunk, Südwestrundfunk, and Sender Freies Berlin (WDR, SWR, and SFB, Germany), Mediaset (Italy), Radio Télévision Suisse Romande and Radiotelevisione della Svizzera Italiana (RTSR and RTSI, Switzerland), Radio-télévision belge de la Communauté française (RTBF, Belgium), and the French Centre national de la cinématographie. The series premiered in France on Canal+, beginning on 10 December 1996, and it was subsequently broadcast on the channels of the rest of the broadcasters that participated in the production dubbed into their own language.

== Episodes ==
1. The First Navigators
2. Alexander the Great
3. Erik the Red and the Discovery of America
4. Genghis Khan
5. Ibn Battuta (in Marco Polo's footsteps)
6. The Great Junks
7. Vasco da Gama
8. The Taxis and the first Postal System
9. The Pinzon Brothers (The Hidden Side of Christopher Columbus)
10. Amerigo Vespucci
11. Ferdinand Magellan and Elcano
12. Cabeza de Vaca
13. Vitus Bering
14. Louis Antoine de Bougainville and the Pacifique
15. Bruce and the Nile
16. Charles Marie de La Condamine
17. James Cook
18. Alexander von Humboldt
19. Lewis and Clark Expedition
20. Stuart & Burke and Australia
21. Stanley & Livingstone
22. Roald Amundsen, Robert Falcon Scott and the South Pole
23. Alexandra David-Néel in Tibet
24. Piccard from the Mountain Tops to the Depth of the Sea
25. Up to the Peaks
26. Up to the Stars

== See also ==
- List of French animated television series
