= Procidis =

French animation studio

- Type: Subsidiary
- Industry: Animation, production, distribution, licensing
- Founded: 1962; 64 years ago
- Founder: Albert Barillé
- Headquarters: Neuilly-sur-Seine, Île-de-France, France
- Area served: Worldwide
- Key people: Benoît Di Sabatino (president); Hélène Barillé (managing director)
- Parent: Banijay Kids & Family (2024–present)
- Website: www.procidis.com

Procidis is a French animation studio, founded in 1962 by Albert Barillé, which among other things produced the educational series Once Upon a Time... (Man 1978, Space 1982, Life 1987, The Americas 1992, The Discoverers 1994, The Explorers 1996, Music 2007, Planet Earth 2008 and The Objects 2023). Its programs are sold in more than 100 countries. The last series launched that was translated into English was "Les Zooriginaux" (Wild Instinct), which was released in 2001 in France, Belgium, Germany, Italy, and the United Kingdom. The Music (Spanish) and Planet Earth (French) series have not yet been translated into English. In 2024, Banijay Entertainment acquired a majority stake in the studio, integrating it into the Banijay Kids & Family unit.
