= Once Upon a Time... (franchise) =

French educational animation franchise

DVD box set of the first seven series.

Once Upon a Time... ("Il était une fois...") is a French educational animation franchise, created by Albert Barillé for his animation studio Procidis. There are eight distinct series, each focusing on different aspects of knowledge. Once Upon a Time... has been shown in a hundred countries, and 150 million video cassettes and DVDs have been sold around the world, as well as 250 million tie-in books.

There are eight series in all. These are mostly historical, with Once Upon a Time... Man being focused on the overall history of mankind. Most of the others are more focused on specified historical fields, such as the lives and exploits of the explorers or inventors, except for Space and Life. The former was a science fiction series, while the latter featured an explanation on the workings of the body. All feature the same stock characters, in similar archetypal roles. "Life" is the only one to not feature the children as grown-up or adolescent archetypes of said characters, but as parts of the human organism.

Most of the series are in the animated documentary genre and teach in an expository style.

== Chronology ==
Once Upon a Time... Man
Originally produced in 1978, this series is the original series of the franchise, detailing the overall history of mankind. It was directed by Albert Barillé.

Once Upon a Time... Space
Produced in 1982, this series was a science fiction follow up to the last episode of Man, which was futuristic in scope. The last six episodes of this series were made into a film titled Revenge of the Humanoids. It was directed by Albert Barillé.

Once Upon a Time... Life
Produced in 1986, this series focuses on the workings of the human body, and has the children shown as the archetypes of various parts of the organism (cells, bacteria, etc.). It was directed by Albert Barillé.

Once Upon a Time... The Americas
Produced in 1991, this series focuses on the history of the American continent through all its settlements and their historical events. It was directed by Albert Barillé.

Once Upon a Time... The Discoverers
Produced in 1994, this series focuses on various thinkers and inventors throughout history, from the ancient Chinese, through Henry the Navigator, Johannes Gutenberg, Leonardo da Vinci, Galileo Galilei, Isaac Newton, Marie Sklodowska-Curie, until "tomorrow". It was directed by Albert Barillé.

Once Upon a Time... The Explorers
Produced in 1996, this series focuses on various explorers, from "The First Navigators", through Vasco de Gama, Cabeza de Vaca and Alexander von Humboldt, to the Lewis and Clark Expedition and Alexandra David Neel. It was, as all the series before it, directed by Albert Barillé.

Once Upon a Time... Planet Earth
Produced in 2008, this series focuses on the preservation of the natural environment, and warnings about global warming, the greenhouse effect, pollution, and others. It features very different animation compared to earlier series. It was the last film directed by Albert Barillé. This series has been released in English, Finnish, Dutch, German, Italian, Polish, Romanian and Hungarian dubbed versions.

Once Upon a Time... The Objects
A series that premiered on RTS in Switzerland on 30 December 2023 and premiered on Okoo during mid 2024, it talks about various objects and their histories, This series has (currently) been released in an Italian dubbed version airing on Cartoonito in Italy beginning in mid-2024.

== Characters ==
The series Once Upon a Time... illustrated the various subjects (as listed above) from the point of view of a group that is always composed of similar recurring figures that represent different archetypal roles:

- Maestro (Roger Carel) – The wise old man. He usually serves as the head of the tribe, as a religious priest, as an adviser to the king and as an inventor. Maestro has long white hair, a pair of antennal growths and a beard that covers his entire body. He is seen to stash things away in this beard, sometimes fumbling quite a bit to find the object he wishes to present. He serves as the mentor to the children, telling them about the various subjects.
- Peter / Pierre (Roger Carel) – The courageous and handsome young man. He represents the image of the good person and he is father of Pierrot and Little Pierrette.
- Jumbo / Le Gros (Yves Barsacq) – The strong young man. Jumbo is Peter's best friend. A quite large person, with red hair and great physical powers. At times he tends to be a little clumsy, but he is very strong. He often defends Peter, Pierrette (and Psi in the spinoffs) from the bullies.
  - Jumbo and Peter have also young counterparts (Little Jumbo and Pierrot (Vincent Ropion) and their development is usually followed from childhood to adolescence, Peter has a daughter too named Little Pierrette).
- Psi – The good young girl. A black-haired Brazilian woman who serves mostly as Peter's girlfriend, or as Peter's wife.
- Pierrette (Annie Balestra) – The good young woman. Blonde-haired, serves mostly as Pierrot's and Little Pierrette's mother, or as Peter's wife.
- Little Pierrette – She is Peter and Pierrette's daughter, as well as Pierrot's younger sister. She is not very important in the series, and never has been a core character. Her style changed in all the series. (In "Man" she has blond and long hair, In "Life" she has got very short hair, in "Discoverer" she has a ponytail).
- The Pest / Le Teigneux (Claude Bertrand) – The big bully, friend of 'The Dwarf', a large and strong bully that enjoys picking on others or attacking them. He is strong, but Jumbo is stronger.
- The Dwarf / Le Nabot (Patrick Préjean) – The little bully, friend of 'The Pest', weak but shrewd and an intriguer. He has a malicious giggle. Both he and his friend display downright negative characters (portraying traitors, spies, conspirators, murderers, or at least skeptics or hypocrites). They are the ones to generally start up a conflict between the circle of children.
- The Clock – Displays the year when the events occur. Sometimes it has a character and reacts to what the screen shows. For example, it complains when narration proceeds many years forwards or glares at the scenery when something interesting is shown.

Some of them had historical roles. For example, Pest as Goliath and Pierrot as David. Maestro had the role of Leonardo da Vinci and mostly of benevolent or enlightened rulers (amongst these, he surprisingly represented Kublai Khan).
