= Once Upon a Time... Space =

Animated television series (1982–1983)

- DVD box set cover art
- French: Il était une fois… l'Espace
- Genre: Science fiction; Animation
- Created by: Albert Barillé
- Developed by: Procidis
- Voices of: Roger Carel; Annie Balestra; Vincent Ropion; Alain Dorval
- Composer: Michel Legrand
- Countries of origin: List: France; Argentina; Canada; Italy; Japan; Netherlands; Spain
- Original language: French
- No. of episodes: 26

Production
- Running time: 26 minutes
- Production companies: List: Procidis; France Régions; Société Radio-Canada; Radiotelevisione italiana; Katholieke Radio Omroep; Televisión Española; Crustel; Eiken

Original release
- Network: FR3
- Release: 2 October 1982 – 2 April 1983

Related
- Once Upon a Time… Man (1978); Once Upon a Time… Life (1987)

Once Upon a Time... Space (French: Il était une fois… l'Espace) is a science fiction animated television series created and directed by Albert Barillé. It is the second series in the Once Upon a Time... franchise. It reprises almost all of the characters from its predecessor, Once Upon a Time... Man, and adapts them into a science fiction futuristic context.

The series was produced by French studio Procidis in co-production with France Régions (FR3, France), Société Radio-Canada (Canada), Radiotelevisione italiana (RAI, Italy), Katholieke Radio Omroep (KRO, Netherlands), Televisión Española (TVE, Spain), Crustel (Argentina), and Eiken (Japan) who was the one who made the animation. The series premiered in France on FR3, between 2 October 1982 and 2 April 1983, and it was subsequently broadcast on the channels of the rest of the broadcasters that participated in the production dubbed into their own language.

The show was animated in Japan by the animation studio Eiken, and is thus considered an anime as it also aired in Japan on Fuji Television, albeit not until 1984, under the title Galaxy Patrol PJ (Note: Japanese: 銀河パトロールPJ, Hepburn: Ginga Patorōru PJ). In contrast to the show's success in the West, the series' Japanese broadcast was consigned to an early-morning time slot and attracted little attention, although it did gain a cult following in Japan in the following years. The Japanese dub for the anime never received a home release and only re-aired on AT-X during the summer of 2006.

== Synopsis ==
Unlike the rest of the Once Upon a Time... titles, Once Upon a Time... Space revolves around a fictional premise rather than an edutainment theme. The series still has a handful of educational information (such as an episode discussing the rings of the planet Saturn) but nowhere as prevalent as its predecessor Once Upon a Time... Man nor its successor Once Upon a Time... Life.

The series succeeds Once Upon a Time... Man. It reprises almost all of the characters from the past series and adapts them into a science-fiction context.

The story is about the confrontation between several galactic powers. Among them there is the Omega Confederation (of which Earth is a member), the military Republic of Cassiopeia (led by General The Pest) and a powerful supercomputer which controls an army of robots. A group of super powerful creatures called the Humanoids later appear in the series.

The show follows the adventures of space police members Pierrot and Mercedes (aka Psi). Pierrot is the son of Colonel Pierre and President Pierrette. The series has a more egalitarian message than its predecessor as the supreme leader of the protagonists is a female President and Psi is a co-protagonist. The previous series instead focused on male protagonists.

The scenarios of several episodes adapt elements of Greek mythology, other mythologies, and European legends. Among them are the Apple of Discord, Atlantis, David and Goliath, the Olympian Gods, and Prometheus. Other episodes deal with the existence of God, the relationship of man with modernity and machines, the limits of technology, comparisons between armed peace under the rule of a dictator and the difficulty of maintaining order in a democracy, higher spiritual beings encountered at the beginning and the end of the series etc. Some planets visited by the characters are replicas of the Earth at a specific era in its history, thus allowing some didactic interludes over the nature of these eras.

The series contains little to no violence, the heroes mostly use non-lethal stun weapons in combat. The exception is the use of disintegrating laser beams against wild animals.

The Earth does not play a central role in this series. The capital of the Confederation is on the planet Omega, far from Earth. The Confederation consists of multiple allied powers: Aldebaran, Auriga, Cassiopeia, Hydra, Scorpio, and Vega. The Confederation has a democratically elected government and a president.

== Cast ==
- Colonel Pierre ... Roger Carel
- President Pierrette ... Annie Balestra
- Lieutenant/Captain Pierrot ... Vincent Ropion
- Psi (Mercedes) ... Annie Balestra
- Robotic equivalent of Maestro Métro ... Roger Carel
- Commander Jumbo ... Alain Dorval
- Petit Gros
- Grand Ordinateur
- Professor Maestro ... Roger Carel
- 20th century Maestro
- General The Pest ... Alain Dorval
- The Dwarf ... Roger Carel

== Spacecraft ==
The French illustrator Philippe Bouchet (better known as Manchu) worked on some of the spacecraft and set designs.

Omega Confederation:

- Flea
- Hummingbird
- Spider
- Dragonfly
- Blue bird
- Omega Cruiser
- Omega Shuttle
- Cosmopolitan

Cassiopeia:

- Nautilus
- Murene
- Battle cruiser

Earth:

- Ursus

== Episodes ==
No.	Title	Original release date
1	"The Planet Omega" "(La planète Oméga)"	9 October 1982
2	"The Saurians" "(Les Sauriens)"	16 October 1982
3	"The Green Planet" "(La planète verte)"	23 October 1982
4	"Towards Andromeda" "(Du côté d’Andromède)"	30 October 1982
5	"The Cro-Magnons" "(Les Cro-Magnons)"	6 November 1982
6	"The Revolt of the Robots" "(La révolte des robots)"	13 November 1982
7	"The Planet Mytho" "(La planète Mytho)"	20 November 1982
8	"The Long Voyage" "(Le long voyage)"	27 November 1982
9	"In Cassiopea" "(Cassiopée)"	4 December 1982
10	"A Planet Blown to Pieces" "(La planète déchiquetée)"	11 December 1982
11	"Shipwrecked in Space" "(Les naufragés de l’espace)"	18 December 1982
12	"The Giants" "(Les géants)"	25 December 1982
13	"The Incas" "(Les Incas)"	1 January 1983
14	"In the Land of the Dinosaurs" "(Chez les dinosaures)"	8 January 1983
15	"The Rings of Saturn" "(Les anneaux de Saturne)"	15 January 1983
16	"The Unstoppable Menace" "(L’imparable menace)"	22 January 1983
17	"Earth" "(Terre!)"	29 January 1983
18	"Atlantis" "(L’Atlantide)"	5 February 1983
19	"The Strange Return to Omega" "(L’étrange retour vers Oméga)"	12 February 1983
20	"The Revenge of the Robots" "(La revanche des robots)"	19 February 1983
21	"The Humanoids" "(Les Humanoïdes)"	26 February 1983
22	"An Hostile World" "(Un monde hostile)"	5 March 1983
23	"City in Flight" "(Cité en vol)"	12 March 1983
24	"The Great Computer" "(Le grand ordinateur)"	19 March 1983
25	"The Battle of the Titans" "(Combat de titans)"	26 March 1983
26	"The Infinity of Space" "(L’infini de l’espace)"	2 April 1983

== Characters ==
The series features the following characters.

- Colonel Pierre. He is the head of the Omega Space Police and the husband of the President of the Confederation. He is a happily married man, strict and highly moral.
- Pierrette. President of the Omega Confederation, wife of Pierre, and mother of Pierrot. She is a smiling figure and a skilled politician. She governs by building consensus among Council members.
- Pierrot. He is the son of Colonel Pierre and President Pierrette. He joined the Space Police of the Omega Confederation after completing his studies. He finds himself in command of a dragonfly-type vessel. He starts the series with the rank of lieutenant, and he later becomes a captain. His promotion is a reward for his bravery in saving the Earth from an attack by a remote-controlled rocket. He is a kind, brave man with a curious mind and a thirst for discovery.
- Mercedes, nicknamed "Psi". She is a young Hispanic woman, calm and involved. She is particularly intuitive, precognitive, a telepath, and a skilled hypnotist. She tries repeatedly to convince Pierrot that her precognitions are both relevant and accurate. He initially distrusts her visions, a source of conflict among them. Gradually, Pierrot comes to trust her more. The characters are love interests to each other. She is very unwilling to kill, preferring to use her weapons to stun and paralyze enemies. She has great respect for living things. However, she is aware of the malice and deceit of Naboth. Psi is of South American, and especially Brazilian descent according to the official website of the series as stated in the Once Upon A Time... Planet Earth section. At many times, the character said herself that she has a specialization into geology.
- Metro. A robot, specifically an "Android with a positronic brain". He is the robotic equivalent of Professor Maestro, that is to explain, he is a scholar among the robots. He manages to defeat opponents by cunning. He was created by Maestro, but Metro thinks (rightly) that he is both more resourceful and intelligent than its creator. He has the same personality as his creator, he is whiny, classic, doting and with great curiosity to know the functioning of humanity. He accompanies Pierrot and Psi in their patrols and helps out in perilous situations. He was destroyed in a crash and would be repaired. He is a great help for the police officers as he highlights the peculiarities of visited worlds.
- Commander Jumbo. He serves under Colonel Pierre. He is direct and impulsive, preferring a good fight than endless discussions. He doesn't hide his aversion to members of the Cassiopeian government.
- Professor Maestro. He is a scholar, the dean of the Omega Confederation. He has an advisory capacity to the council. Doting, grumpy. He is the voice of wisdom but tends to give overly technical statements. He is the creator of Metro, which he made in his image. There is some amusing tension between creator and creation. The main Omega Fleet vessels are also created by the Master.
- Little Jumbo. He is the best friend of Pierrot. They followed the training course of the Police Academy together, and they know each other for a long time. He is the son of Commander Jumbo and he inherited the same temperament as his father, namely a preference for fights. He has a non-standard physic, and incredible strength. He is somewhat unbalanced, but kind at heart.
- Pierrot's sister . Called Little Pierrette in the French dub. Despite featuring in the end credits, she mostly gets minor appearances. She is actually paired with Little Jumbo.
- General The Pest. He is the supreme head of the constellation Cassiopeia. He is an aggressive, authoritarian, stupid, and narrow-minded man. He lacks in common sense and wants above all to annex the rest of the universe. He is the archetypal villain. Although he managed to rise to power by election, he does not respect the rules of democracy and dismisses the members of the council when they oppose his decisions. He believes he manipulates the forces of the Great computer, while it is indeed he who is manipulated. He represents a member state of the Omega Confederation, but President Pierrette has to devote great efforts to keep him in check. She switches tactics between diplomacy and intimidation to reason with him.
- The Dwarf. He is the consul of Cassiopeia and representative of the General The Pest to the Omega Council, until the departure of Cassiopeia from the Confederation. He is the chief advisor to The Pest, but he is smarter than his master. He manipulates his leader and pulls the strings. He understands that Psi has strange powers and wants to keep her activities monitored.
- The Great Computer. He appears towards the end of the series (ep.21). He is the mastermind of the Humanoids. He is a villain with noble motives, as he wants to prevent humans from making war. But he pursues this goal beyond the point of reason and imposes a totalitarian dictatorship. He was created by an Earth scientist who was tired of conflicts. At the end of his life, the scientist programmed his creation to pursue this goal. Never questioning this goal, the Computer uses radical means to trigger the greatest disaster of the universe. He is the symbol of the cold methodical machines, which cannot properly replace human judgment.
- Maestro of the 20th century. He is an Earth man who departed from the earth and went into hibernation in the year 2023 to study the Andromeda galaxy with a crew of two other people, Farmer (The Mechanic) and Hardy (The Navigator). After 1000 years he and the crew woke up from hibernation close to planet omega.

== Broadcast information ==
Country	Television broadcasts
France	FR3 **, Télé-Québec
Finland	Yle TV1, MTV3, Subtv Juniori
Australia	SBS
Canada	CBC Television, Télévision de Radio-Canada **
Italy	RAI **
Greece	ERT
Spain	Televisión Española (TVE) **
Netherlands	Kindernet, Katholieke Radio Omroep (KRO) **
Switzerland	SSR (French)
Belgium	RTBF, BRT
Argentina	Crustel S.A. */**
Japan	Eiken Co. Ltd., aired on Fuji Television */**
Norway	TV2
West Germany	WDR, SWF
Austria	ORF
Sweden	SVT
Portugal	RTP
Republic of Ireland	RTÉ
Iceland	Sjónvarpið
United Kingdom	Channel 4
United States of America	The History Channel
Israel	Logi
Poland	Telewizja Polska (TVP), TV Puls
South Africa	SABC
Taiwan	Taiwan Television (TTV)
Hungary	Minimax
(Czech Republic) Czech	ČT1
Denmark	DR1

* Production company
** Contributing co-producer

== Music ==
The main title music and instrumental score of the series as a whole were composed by Michel Legrand, his first work for the Once Upon a Time... series.

=== Theme music and song ===
The series' eponymous theme song was performed in the original French-language version by Jean-Pierre Savelli. An alternate version was recorded for the compilation feature film Revenge of the Humanoids, and was performed by Virginia Vee. The song was released as a single in 1982 by RCA Records (PB 61015), along with a condensed audio adaptation of the episode "Du Cote d’Andromède" (PL 37720). A second single of the song was issued in 1983 with another Savelli song "Humanoïdes" (PB 61074); the lyrics were later translated in the English-language dub, retitled as "Fly with Me", this version was also sung by Virginia Vee.

=== Score ===
The incidental score made sure use of blending Legrand's signature jazz-funk with synthesized electronic music; most of the instrumental music from the series would later be reused for later Once Upon a Time... series, starting with Life.

A soundtrack album collecting all the incidental music of the series was first released in 1999 by Procidis (56101), and later reissued in 2001 by Loga-Rythme (LR-677004) as a part of the Anime Classique range.

== See also ==
- List of French animated television series
