= Paris Jazz Piano =

Studio album by Michel Legrand
- Released: 1960
- Recorded: October 20–21 & 23, & November 9, 1959; Blanqui Studio, Paris
- Genre: Jazz
- Length: 31:07
- Label: Philips; LP 76519
- Producer: Daniel Richard

Professional ratings
Review scores
Source	Rating
The Penguin Guide to Jazz Recordings	3/4 stars

Paris Jazz Piano is a studio album by jazz pianist Michel Legrand, released in 1960 on Philips Records.

== Track listing ==
1. "Sous les ponts de Paris" (Jean Rodor, Scotto) - 2:55
2. "Paris in the Spring" (Revel, Gordon) - 3:32
3. "April in Paris" (Harburg, Duke) - 5:14
4. "Sous le ciel de Paris" (Hubert Giraud, Jean Dréjac) - 1:52
5. "Paris Canaille" (Ferré) - 2:04
6. "Paris, je t'aime... d'amour" (Clifford Grey, Henri Battaille, Victor Schertzinger) - 4:24
7. "I Love Paris" (Porter) - 2:52
8. "The Last Time I Saw Paris" (Kern, Hammerstein II) - 2:25
9. "Moulin Rouge" (Auric, Engvick) - 2:41
10. "La Vie en rose" (Piaf, Louiguy) - 3:08

Recorded on October 20 (5, 7, 10), October 21 (1, 9), October 23 (8) and November 9 (2, 3, 6), 1959.

== Personnel ==
- Michel Legrand - piano
- Guy Pedersen - bass
- Gus Wallez - drums, bongos
