= Wild Instinct =

- Created by: Procidis
- Starring: Michel Elias; Natalie Homs; Emmanuel Fouquet; Thierry Kazazian; Danielle Hazan; Hélène Levesque
- Country of origin: France
- Original language: French
- No. of episodes: 52

Production
- Running time: 13 minutes
- Production companies: Procidis; Praxinos

Original release
- Network: M6
- Release: 2001

Wild Instinct (Les Zooriginaux in French) is a 2001 children's television series produced by Procidis about a group of animals living in a zoo. They lead a secret, civilized, sophisticated life when humans do not watch them.

The series premiered in 2001 in France, Belgium, Germany, Italy, and the United Kingdom. 52 episodes were produced.

== Episodes ==
1. Penguin under pressure
2. Like father, like son
3. Who am I?
4. Croca gets tough
5. The zoo book
6. Tiger Minor
7. Alca's secret
8. Paparazzi
9. Diet this
10. Commando Komo
11. I love Gnu
12. Armagibbon
13. For the love of Lea
14. When the heat's on
15. Woki E.T.
16. All work and no play
17. Rejuvenation
18. Attaché-case
19. Alca's nightmare
20. A head for figures
21. Zootomatik
22. Man eater
23. Once a star, always a star
24. Artie alley cat
25. Money, money
26. Man's best friend
27. Rumour is rife
28. That's no elephant, that's my wife
29. Astro-Glodys
30. Rats-ketters
31. The curse of the weird wolf
32. The haunted cage
33. One animal too many
34. Chaet never prospers
35. Chaotic park
36. Unreluctant zero
37. The invisible ape
38. Dropped from the sky
39. Lord Joe
40. Head in the clouds
41. The fleas war
42. Saint-Valentine's Day
43. No tea for Tigris
44. The skunk who stunk
45. Babe new world
46. The great zoo race
47. Best of enemies
48. Mad toad's day
49. knocked senseless
50. Miss Connoch's horoscope
51. Keeper's Christmas
52. The sleigh
