= Once Upon a Time... The Americas =

Educational animated television series (1991–1992)

- DVD box set cover art
- French: Il était une fois... les Amériques
- Genre: Edutainment; Animation
- Created by: Albert Barillé
- Voices of: Roger Carel; Olivier Destrez; Marie-Laure Beneston; Patrick Préjean; Sady Rebbot
- Countries of origin: List: France; Belgium; Canada; Finland; Germany; Italy; Spain; Switzerland
- Original language: French
- No. of episodes: 26

Production
- Running time: 26 minutes
- Production companies: List: Procidis; FR3; Canal+; Televisión Española; Westdeutscher Rundfunk; Südwestrundfunk; Reteitalia; Société Radio-Canada; Radio Télévision Suisse Romande; Radiotelevisione della Svizzera Italiana; Oy. Yleisradio Ab.; Radio-télévision belge de la Communauté française; Belgische Radio en Televisie Nederlandse Uitzendingen; Centre national de la cinématographie

Original release
- Network: Canal+
- Release: 28 October 1991 – 24 March 1993

Related
- Once Upon a Time... Life (1987); Once Upon a Time... The Discoverers (1994)

Once Upon a Time... The Americas (French: Il était une fois... les Amériques) is an educational animated television series created and directed by Albert Barillé. It is the fourth series in the Once Upon a Time... franchise. It explains the history of the Americas in a format adapted for children, with the action focused around one group of characters which appear in every episode dealing with the problems of the period depicted.

The series was produced by French studio Procidis in co-production with FR3 and Canal+ (France), Televisión Española (TVE, Spain), Westdeutscher Rundfunk and Südwestrundfunk (WDR and SWR, Germany), Reteitalia (Italy), Société Radio-Canada (Canada), Radio Télévision Suisse Romande and Radiotelevisione della Svizzera Italiana (Switzerland), Oy. Yleisradio Ab. (Yle, Finland), Radio-télévision belge de la Communauté française and Belgische Radio en Televisie Nederlandse Uitzendingen (RTBF and BRT, Belgium), and the French Centre national de la cinématographie. The series premiered in France on Canal+, beginning on 28 October 1991, and it was subsequently broadcast on the channels of the rest of the broadcasters that participated in the production dubbed into their own language.

The show aired in the United States on the History Channel in January–March 1995.

== Synopsis ==
The series, aimed at children, tells the history of the Americas through all their settlements (Eskimos, Aztecs, Incas, etc.) and their historical events (conquest of the West, American Revolutionary War, etc.).

== Episodes ==
1. The First Americans
2. The Hunters
3. The Conquerors of the Great North
4. The Promised Land
5. The Tumulus Builders
6. The Aztecs before the Conquest
7. Christopher Columbus' Dream
8. America!
9. Cortes and the Aztecs
10. Que viva Mexico!
11. Pizarro and the Inca Empire
12. Jacques Cartier
13. The Age of the Conquistadores
14. Champlain
15. England and the Thirteen Colonies
16. The Indians in the 17th Century
17. The Indians in the 18th Century
18. The End of the French Dream
19. The 13 Colonies Towards Independence
20. The War of Independence
21. Ebony Wood (slavery)
22. The Pioneers
23. Simón Bolívar
24. The Gold Rush
25. The End of the Indian People
26. Towards the 20th Century

== See also ==
- List of French animated television series
