= Once Upon a Time... Man =

Educational animated television series (1978–1979)

- French DVD cover
- French: Il était une fois... l'homme
- Genre: Edutainment; Animation
- Created by: Albert Barillé
- Voices of: Roger Carel; Annie Balestra; Patrick Préjean; Claude Bertrand; Yves Barsacq; Vincent Ropion
- Narrated by: Roger Carel
- Composer: Yasuo Sugiyama
- Countries of origin: List: France; Belgium; Canada; Italy; Japan; Netherlands; Norway; Spain; Sweden; Switzerland
- Original language: French
- No. of episodes: 26

Production
- Running time: 26 minutes
- Production companies: List: Procidis; France Régions; Société Radio-Canada; ACCESS Alberta; Radiotelevisione italiana; Swiss Broadcasting Corporation; Radiodiffusion-Télévision Belge; Belgische Radio en Televisie; Katholieke Radio Omroep; Norsk rikskringkasting; Sveriges Radio; Televisión Española; Tatsunoko Production

Original release
- Network: FR3
- Release: 30 September 1978 – 14 April 1979

Related
- Once Upon a Time... Space (1982)

Once Upon a Time... Man (French: Il était une fois... l'homme) is an animated educational television series created and directed by Albert Barillé. It is the first series in the Once Upon a Time... franchise. It explains human history in a format adapted for children, with the action focused around one group of characters which appear in every episode dealing with the problems of the period depicted. Although historical figures would typically appear as themselves, occasionally they inherit the appearance and some of the personality of one of the archetypes. The series is known for explaining historic events to children from different viewpoints as the main characters come from different civilizations.

The series was produced by French studio Procidis in co-production with France Régions (FR3, France), Société Radio-Canada and ACCESS Alberta (Canada), Radiotelevisione italiana (RAI, Italy), the Swiss Broadcasting Corporation (SSR, Switzerland), Radiodiffusion-Télévision Belge and Belgische Radio en Televisie (RTBF and BRT, Belgium), Katholieke Radio Omroep (KRO, Netherlands), Norsk rikskringkasting (NRK, Norway), Sveriges Radio (SR, Sweden), Televisión Española (TVE, Spain), and Tatsunoko Production (Japan) who was the one who made the animation. The series premiered in France on FR3, between 30 September 1978 and 14 April 1979, and it was subsequently broadcast on the channels of the rest of the broadcasters that participated in the production dubbed into their own language.

Once Upon a Time... Man was purchased by most public broadcasting channels in Europe later, and by many other broadcasters in other countries around the world, and is well-known by a significant percentage of the population. The show aired in the United States on the History Channel starting in January 1996.

== Music ==
=== Theme music ===
The series' opening and ending title sequences famously used Johann Sebastian Bach's Toccata and Fugue in D minor as the main theme music. Shortening the piece to only two minutes in length, the introduction uses the very beginning, which jumps into the start of the middle section and finally the dramatic ending to coincide with the destruction of Earth at the end of the intro. It is generally unknown what is the original soundtrack they used, and whom is the original artist who performed on the organ.

Although this is the theme that is generally used, there are dubbings in some languages that use other themes. The version in Spanish uses a pop song based on the third movement of Ludwig van Beethoven's Septet, adapted by Rafael Trabucchelli and Agustín Serrano, with Spanish lyrics by Marisol Perales and José Luis Perales, and performed by the children's group Caramelos. The version in Italian uses two songs: the song "Io di più" composed by Pippo Baudo and Pippo Caruso, with Italian lyrics by Giorgio Calabrese, and performed by Lino Toffolo, featured in the series' run on RAI; and the song "Conosciamoci un po'" written by Alessandra Valeri Manera and Massimiliano Pani, and performed by Cristina D'Avena, featured in subsequent runs. The version in German uses the song "Tausend Jahre sind ein Tag" by Udo Jürgens.

=== Score ===
A soundtrack album collecting the incidental score composed by Yasuo Sugiyama was released in 2001 by Loga-Rythme (LR-677003) as a part of the Anime Classique range.

==== Track listing ====
All music is composed by Yasuo Sugiyama.

No.	Title	Length
1.	"Toccata et Fugue en Ré Mineur (composed by Johann Sebastian Bach)"	1:33
2.	"A l'Aube de l'Humanité"	0:31
3.	"L'Ingénieux Maestro - Part. I"	1:26
4.	"La Famille Pierrot - Part. I"	0:43
5.	"Des Gens en Paix"	0:38
6.	"Le Village"	1:33
7.	"Et le Temps Passe..."	1:00
8.	"A l'Affût!"	1:11
9.	"Pierrette"	0:47
10.	"Une Idée Saugrenue"	0:45
11.	"La Garnison"	1:51
12.	"En Avant!"	0:40
13.	"Les Jeux du Cirque"	0:36
14.	"Guerres et Querelles"	1:56
15.	"La Tribu"	0:42
16.	"La Famille Pierrot - Part. II"	2:28
17.	"Solitude"	0:59
18.	"L'Espoir"	1:09
19.	"La Vie de Château"	0:51
20.	"Dans le Désert"	0:53
21.	"Le Teigneux"	1:25
22.	"Des Moments de Bonheur"	1:52
23.	"L'Industrie"	1:40
24.	"Danger!"	1:36
25.	"L'Invasion"	1:41
26.	"Cache-Cache"	0:39
27.	"La Collecte des Impôts"	0:48
28.	"Les Inventeurs"	1:18
29.	"Les Enfants de Pierrot"	1:03
30.	"Poursuites"	1:39
31.	"En Amérique du Sud"	0:48
32.	"Les Années Folles"	0:47
33.	"Négociations"	0:47
34.	"L'Exode"	1:41
35.	"La Cachette"	0:41
36.	"Le Conflit"	0:42
37.	"La Persévérance"	0:55
38.	"L'Ingénieux Maestro - Part. II"	1:49
Total length:		44:21

== Characters ==
The episodes of Once Upon a Time… Man typically would follow one family, which most typically used the same set of archetypes that would be reused for the scenario. These same characters would later be used in the later additions to the Once Upon a Time... franchise, with some changes.

- Maestro (Roger Carel) – The wise old man. He usually serves as the head of the tribe, as a religious priest, as an advisor to the king, or as an inventor. Maestro's hair is white and so long that it completely covers his body, and only his facial features, arms, and feet are ever visible; he is also distinguished by two hairs on the top of his head that look like antennae. Maestro often keeps objects in his beard and is sometimes seen fiddling around in it to find the one he wishes to present. He also serves as a mentor to the children of the series.
- Peter / Pierre (Roger Carel) – Another protagonist of the series, with brown hair, presented as an ordinary but likeable man. He is always married to Pierrette and is good friends with Jumbo. He is sometimes referred to as Pierrot. In some of the episodes set in the medieval era, Peter has blonde hair and is named Bert, but his personality and relationships are the same.
- Jumbo / Le Gros (Yves Barsacq) – The strong young man with red curly hair, Jumbo is tall, somewhat clumsy, and very muscular. He prefers to solve problems with his fists, and his best friend Peter often needs to indicate for him not to attack.
- Pierrette (Annie Balestra) – A kind blonde woman, typically married to Peter.
- The Pest / Le Teigneux (Claude Bertrand) – A strong bully and one of two common recurring villains in the series (the other being the Dwarf). He is the major rival opposing Peter and Jumbo, and is either working against them or arguing with them.
- The Dwarf / Le Nabot (Patrick Préjean) – The mastermind behind the Pest, the Dwarf is short and has red hair with three spikes pointing upward. He is often the only one who supports the Pest in his actions, and is often shown as a swindler.
- The Clock – A rectangular box with eyes and hands, typically coloured red, the Clock most commonly simply shows the year that the events on-screen are occurring. Occasionally, the Clock does intervene in the series in a minor role, typically to either have some emotional response like surprise or sadness to an event on-screen, or else to correct Maestro in-series when he has ideas too advanced for his historical time period.

Although historical figures would typically appear as themselves, occasionally one of the archetypes would be used, like Maestro as Leonardo da Vinci.

== Episodes ==
No.	Title	Original release date
1	"And Earth was created…" (Et La Terre Fut...)	30 September 1978
On the history of the Earth and life before humans to Homo erectus.
2	"Neanderthal Man" (L'Homme Du Neanderthal)	7 October 1978
On the Neanderthals on the time of Paleolithic culture to the Ice age.
3	"Cro-Magnon Man" (Le Cro-Magnon)	14 October 1978
On the history of European early modern humans.
4	"The Fertile Valleys" (Les vallées fertiles)	21 October 1978
On the Neolithic Revolution with the rise of agriculture, as well as ancient Mesopotamia, Egypt, Babylon, and Israel. Historical Figures: Cleopatra, David, Delilah, Goliath, Joshua, Moses, Ramses II, Samson
5	"The First Empires" (Les Premiers Empires)	28 October 1978
On the empires of Babylon, Assyria, Persia, and others from about BC 2000 to BC 323. Historical Figures: Alexander the Great, Cyrus the Great, Solomon
6	"The Age of Pericles" (Le siècle de Périclès)	4 November 1978
Mainly on Athens and Sparta during the fifth century BC, ending with Alexander’s empire. Historical Figures: Alcibiades, Alexander the Great, Anaxagoras, Aristophanes, Aristotle, Democritus, Euripides, Herodotus, Hippocrates, Pericles, Phidias (portrayed by Maestro), Protagoras, Socrates, Sophocles, Thucydides
7	"The Pax Romana" (Pax Romana)	18 November 1978
On the time of Julius Caesar, before the Pax Romana commenced. At the end of this episode, the birth and crucifixion of Jesus Christ are briefly featured. Historical Figures: Julius Caesar, Jesus, Vercingetorix
8	"The Conquest of Islam" (Les conquêtes de l'Islam)	25 November 1978
On the Byzantine Empire, the reign of Justinian I (reigned 527–565), and the spread of Islam between the 7th and 8th centuries. Historical Figures: Belisarius, Heraclius, Justinian I, Khosrow II, Muhammad, Theodora
9	"Carolingians" (Carolingens)	2 December 1978
On the Carolingians with the Fall of the Western Roman Empire and the rise of the Frankish Kingdom. Historical Figures: Charlemagne, Charles Martel, Clovis I, Louis the Pious, Judith of Bavaria
10	"The Age of Vikings" (L'âge des Vikings)	9 December 1978
On the age of Vikings, ending with the Norman Conquest of England. Historical Figures:Charles the Fat, Charles the Simple, Rollo
11	"The Cathedral Builders" (Les bâtisseurs de cathédrales)	16 December 1978
On the Middle Ages in the time of the Crusades. Historical Figures: Frederick Barbarossa, Philip II of France, Richard I of England, Saladin
12	"The Travels of Marco Polo" (Les Voyages De Marco Polo)	6 January 1979
On the Mongol Empire and the travels of Marco Polo. Historical Figures: Genghis Khan, Kublai Khan, Marco Polo
13	"The Hundred Years' War" (La guerre de Cent ans)	13 January 1979
On the Late Middle Ages, including the Black Death, the Western Schism, and the Hundred Years' War. Historical Figures: Antipope Alexander V, John Ball, Charles VII of France, Antipope Clement VII, Jan Hus, Joan of Arc, John Wycliffe, Pope Urban VI, Sigismund, Holy Roman Emperor
14	"The Quattrocento" (Le Quattrocentro)	20 January 1979
On the Italian Renaissance, focusing on the life of da Vinci. Historical Figures: Donato Bramante, Francis I of France, Giuliano de' Medici, Lorenzo de’ Medici, Leonardo da Vinci (portrayed by Maestro), Michelangelo, Raphael
15	"The Golden Age of Spain" (Le siècle d'or espagnol)	27 January 1979
On Spain and the New World during the Spanish Golden Age. (Note: TVE did not broadcast this episode in Spain in the first run of the series on the network in 1979, because they considered that it contained stereotypes related to the black legend. TVE did broadcast the episode when they re-broadcast the series in 1983.) Historical Figures: Charles V, Holy Roman Emperor, Christopher Columbus, Ferdinand II of Aragon, Hernan Cortes, Isabella I of Castile.
16	"Elizabethan England" (L'Angleterre d'Élizabeth)	3 February 1979
On the Elizabethan era, mostly on the voyages of Sir Francis Drake. Historical Figures: Anne Boleyn, Francis Drake, Elizabeth I, Henry VIII, Mary, Queen of Scots, Thomas More
17	"The Golden Age of the Low Countries" (L'âge d'or des Provinces-Unies)	10 February 1979
On the Dutch Golden Age, in addition to some discussion of the Protestant Reformation and the Eighty Years’ War.
18	"The Great Reign of Louis XIV" (Le grand siècle de Louis XIV)	17 February 1979
On the reign of Louis XIV. Historical Figures: Louis XIV
19	"Peter the Great and his Times" (Pierre le Grand et son époque)	24 February 1979
On the reforms of Peter I, the Great Northern War, and Prussia under Frederick William I. Historical Figures: Charles XII of Sweden, Frederick the Great, Frederick William I of Prussia, Peter the Great
20	"The Age of Reason" (Le siècle des Lumières)	3 March 1979
On the Age of Enlightenment. Historical Figures: Catherine the Great, Denis Diderot, Frederick the Great, Ivan VI of Russia, Wolfgang Amadeus Mozart, Grigory Potemkin, Maria Theresa, Peter III of Russia
21	"America" (L'Amerique)	10 March 1979
On North America between 1492 and the American Civil War. Historical Figures: Amerigo Vespucci, Charles O'Hara, Christopher Columbus, George III, George Washington, Lafayette, Peter Stuyvesant, Rochambeau, Thomas Jefferson, William Penn
22	"The French Revolution" (La Révolution française)	17 March 1979
On the French Revolution, ending with the French invasion of Russia. Historical Figures: Georges Danton, Olympe de Gouges, Éléonore Duplay, Joséphine de Beauharnais, Louis XVI, Louis Philippe II, Duke of Orléans, Madame du Barry, Jean-Paul Marat, Mirabeau, Napoleon, Maximilien Robespierre, Manon Roland, Jean-Lambert Tallien
23	"The Awakening of the People" (Le printemps des peuples)	24 March 1979
On the sociopolitical developments of the mid-19th century, focusing on the revolutions of 1848, the steam engine and rail transport. Historical Figures: Nicolas-Joseph Cugnot, Alphonse de Lamartine, Louis Philippe I, Napoleon III, Thomas Newcomen, Denis Papin, Thomas Savery
24	"The Belle Époque" (Ah ! La belle époque)	31 March 1979
On the Belle Époque on late 19th century and early 20th century, the development of the automobile, the World War I, and the Russian Revolution. Historical Figures: Vladimir Lenin
25	"The Crazy Years" (Les années folles)	7 April 1979
On the années folles, the history of aviation, the interwar period, the Great Depression, and World War II.
26	"Once Upon a Time… the Earth (and tomorrow?)" (Il était une fois... la terre (Et demain?)	14 April 1979
On the post-war world up to the series' production in 1978, with speculation on the future to 2150.

== Home media ==
A DVD boxed set of all the episodes of the series was produced by the French production company Procidis, and distributed locally by various distributors. The DVD series was produced in French, English (not sold in the UK or US), Finnish, German, Dutch, Hebrew, Norwegian, Spanish, Swedish, and Polish. In 2011, an English-language, Region 1 DVD box set was made available in Canada and the United States. The set was produced and distributed by Imavision.

== See also ==
- List of French animated television series
- Histeria!
