= Roger Carel =

French actor (1927–2020)

- Born: Roger Bancharel; 14 August 1927; Paris, France
- Died: 11 September 2020 (aged 93); Montfermeil, Seine-Saint-Denis, France
- Occupation: Actor

Roger Carel (French pronunciation: [ʁɔʒe kaʁɛl]; born Roger Bancharel; 14 August 1927 – 11 September 2020) was a French actor. He appeared in many supporting roles in French films, and was particularly familiar to French audiences as a voice actor, both in dubbing and in animation. In the latter capacity, he was notably associated with the comic book character Asterix, which he voiced in nine animated feature adaptations released between 1967 and 2014.

== Roles ==
Carel's notable dubbing performances include David Suchet as Hercule Poirot on Agatha Christie's Poirot, Star Wars' C-3PO, and Benny Hill in French broadcasts of The Benny Hill Show. Cartoon characters voiced in French by Carel include Winnie-the-Pooh, Piglet, and Rabbit in the Winnie the Pooh franchise.

He also voiced Wally Gator, Mickey Mouse, Yogi Bear, Fred Flintstone, Kermit the Frog, Heathcliff, Danger Mouse, Foghorn Leghorn, ALF, Fat Albert and many other famous characters in French.

== Filmography ==
=== French animated productions ===
- Asterix the Gaul (1967) as Asterix
- Asterix and Cleopatra (1968) as Asterix / Caesar's Spy / Dogmatix
- Daisy Town (1971) as Undertaker / Cavalry Colonel
- Tarzoon: Shame of the Jungle (1975) as second Siamese / Short / English general
- The Twelve Tasks of Asterix (1976) as Asterix / Caius Tiddlius / Roman Senator #3 / Dogmatix
- La Ballade des Dalton (1978) as Ming Li Foo / Mathias Bones / newspaper vendor / Juan the Mexican
- Once Upon a Time... (1978–2008, TV Series) as Maestro / Peter
- Le chaînon manquant (1980) as Croak / Le gros con #4
- Minoïe (1981) as Le Grand Amiralissime
- La revanche des humanoides (1983) as Maestro
- Lucky Luke (1984) as Jolly Jumper
- Asterix Versus Caesar (1985) as Asterix / Dogmatix
- Asterix in Britain (1986) as Asterix / Dogmatix
- The Big Bang (1987) as Soviet General, radio voice, football match commentator
- Asterix and the Big Fight (1989) as Asterix / Dogmatix
- Asterix: The Mansions of the Gods (2014) as Asterix / Dogmatix (final film role)

=== Voice dubbing (French) ===
- The Great Dictator (1940, dubbed in 1968) as the Barber/Adenoid Hynkel (Charlie Chaplin)
- The Benny Hill Show (1951–1991, TV Series) as Benny Hill
- Pixie and Dixie and Mr. Jinks (1958-1961) as Pixie / Dixie
- The Flintstones (1960–1966) (TV series) as Fred Flintstone
- One Hundred and One Dalmatians (1961) as Pongo
- The Yogi Bear Show (1961-1962) as Yogi Bear (2nd dubbing)
- Hey There, It's Yogi Bear! (1964) as Boo-Boo Bear
- Hogan's Heroes (1965–1971, TV Series) as Colonel Crittendon
- The Jungle Book (1967) as Kaa
- The Aristocats (1970) as Roquefort / Lafayette
- Groovie Goolies (1970) as Drac / Hagatha
- Fat Albert and the Cosby Kids (1972-1985) as Fat Albert
- Fritz the Cat (1972) as Fritz the cat
- Heavy Traffic (1973) as Angie Corleone
- Robin Hood (1973) as Sir Hiss
- Alice in Wonderland (1974) as Cheshire Cat (2nd dub)
- Pinocchio (1975) as Jiminy Cricket (2nd dub)
- The Muppet Show (1976–1981, TV Series) as Kermit the Frog / The Announcer / Dr. Bunsen Honeydew
- Star Wars: Episode IV – A New Hope (1977) as C-3PO
- The Many Adventures of Winnie the Pooh (1977) as Pooh / Piglet / Rabbit
- The Rescuers (1977) as Bernard
- Doctor Snuggles (1979–1980, TV Series) as Doctor Snuggles
- Maeterlinck's Blue Bird: Tyltyl and Mytyl's Adventurous Journey (1980, TV Series) as Spirit of Fire / Spirit of Time / Spirit of Bread / Spirit of Milk / Narrator
- Star Wars: Episode V – The Empire Strikes Back (1980) as C-3PO
- Danger Mouse (1981-1992) as Danger Mouse / Stiletto
- The Fox and the Hound (1981) as Boomer
- Fanny and Alexander (1982) as Oscar Ekdahl (Allan Edwall)
- The Mysterious Cities of Gold (1982, TV Series) as occasional narrator
- Pac-Man (1982–1983, TV Series) as Blinky
- The Dragon That Wasn't (Or Was He?) (1983) as Olivier
- Welcome to Pooh Corner (1983–1987, TV Series) as Pooh / Piglet / Rabbit
- Star Wars: Episode VI – Return of the Jedi (1983) as C-3PO
- The Right Stuff (1983) as Narrator
- Heathcliff and The Catillac Cats (1984–1988, TV Series) as Heathcliff
- Dumbo (1984) as Timothy Q. Mouse (2nd French dub)
- The Karate Kid (1984) as Mr. Miyagi
- Retenez Moi...Ou Je Fais Un Malheur (1984) as Jerry Logan
- The Great Mouse Detective (1986) as Basil
- The Karate Kid Part II (1986) as Mr. Miyagi
- ALF (1986–1990, TV Series) as ALF
- An American Tail (1986) as Digit
- Spaceballs (1987) as President Skroob
- Duck Tales (1987–1989, TV Series) as Flintheart Glomgold / Duckworth
- The New Adventures of Winnie the Pooh (1988–1991, TV Series) Pooh / Piglet / Rabbit
- The Land Before Time (1988) Petrie
- Agatha Christie's Poirot (1989–?, TV Series) as Hercule Poirot
- The Rescuers Down Under (1990) as Bernard
- Plaisir d'amour (1991) as Circé
- Law & Order (1991–1992, TV Series) as Phil Cerreta
- Les mille et une farces de Pif et Hercule (1993)
- Jurassic Park (1993) as tour car guide's voice
- The Swan Princess (1994) as Puffin
- The Land Before Time II: The Great Valley Adventure (1994) as Petrie
- Asterix Conquers America (1994) as Asterix
- The Land Before Time III: The Time of the Great Giving (1995) as Petrie (French dubbing)
- Mr. Men and Little Miss (1995-1997) as various male voices
- Pooh's Grand Adventure: The Search for Christopher Robin (1997) as Pooh / Piglet / Rabbit
- Air Bud (1997) as Norman Snively
- Star Wars: Episode I – The Phantom Menace (1999) as C-3PO
- The Tigger Movie (2000) as Pooh / Rabbit
- The Towering Inferno (2000) as Harlee Clairborne
- Star Wars: Episode II – Attack of the Clones (2002) as C-3PO
- The Jungle Book 2 (2003) as Kaa
- Piglet's Big Movie (2003) as Pooh / Rabbit
- Star Wars: Clone Wars (2003–2005, TV Series) as C-3PO
- Robots (2005) as Madame Gasket
- Desperate Housewives (2005–2010, TV Series) as Reverend Sikes
- Star Wars: Episode III – Revenge of the Sith (2005) as C-3PO
- Lord of War (2005) as Simeon Weisz
- Asterix and the Vikings (2006) as Asterix / Dogmatix
- Nocturna (2007) as Moka
- Mr. Bean's Holiday (2007) as Vicar
- My Friends Tigger & Pooh (2007–2010, TV Series) as Pooh / Rabbit
- The Mummy: Tomb of the Dragon Emperor (2008) as Roger Wilson
- Star Wars: The Clone Wars (2008) as C-3PO
- Star Wars: The Clone Wars (2008–2010, TV Series) as C-3PO
- Harry Potter and the Half-Blood Prince (2009) as Horace Slughorn
- True Grit (2010) as Colonel Stonehill

=== Live action ===
- Meeting in Paris (1956) as Gendarme (uncredited)
- A Friend of the Family (1957) as tuner
- The Tricyclist (1957) as peasant
- Incognito (1958) as policeman
- Chéri, fais-moi peur (1958) as Kougloff, the Russian spy
- Le petit prof (1959) as City hall clerk
- Croquemitoufle (1959) as Maurice
- Auguste (1961) as Albert, le brother-in-law
- L'empire de la nuit (1962)
- Les Bricoleurs (1963) as Cout de la Bigle
- Ophélia (1963) as Worker
- La foire aux cancres (Chronique d'une année scolaire) (1963) as Mr. Garrigou
- La mort d'un tueur (1964) as café owner
- Dulcinea del Toboso (1964)
- La grosse caisse (1965) as Souvestre
- The Saint Lies in Wait (1966) as professor (uncredited)
- The Two of Us (1967) as Victor
- Salut Berthe! (1968) as Camberlin
- A Flea in Her Ear (1968) as Mr. Plommard
- Béru et ces dames (1968) as Maximilien Bernal
- Clérambard (1969) as parish priest
- The Brain (1969) as Frankie Scannapieco (voice, uncredited)
- A Golden Widow (1969) as Aristophane Percankas
- Et qu'ça saute! (1970) as Fedorovitch
- On est toujours trop bon avec les femmes (1971) as Frank Dillon
- Delusions of Grandeur (1971) as one-eye (voice, uncredited)
- Le Viager (1972) as news announcer (voice)
- Églantine (1972) as Ernest
- Elle cause plus, elle flingue (1972) as Sammy
- Le petit poucet (1972) as Narrator (voice)
- Les Charlots font l'Espagne (1972) as boat captain (voice, uncredited)
- Joë petit boum-boum (1973) as Bzz
- Oh, If Only My Monk Would Want (Ah! Si mon moine voulait...) (1973) as Attorney Bornet
- The Big Store (1973) as auctioneer
- The Holes (1974) as Alberto Sopranelli,
- Le plumard en folie (1974) as the bed (voice)
- Q (1974) as Narrator (uncredited)
- Soldat Duroc, ça va être ta fête! (1975) as Oberst Strumpf
- Les grands moyens (1976) as commissioner Honoré Compana
- La grande récré (1976) as pharmacist
- La grande frime (1977) as Chomer
- Dis bonjour à la dame!.. (1977) as postal supervisor
- La Gueule de l'autre (1979) as Roland Favereau
- Les phallocrates (1980) as mental asylum director
- Jupiter's Thigh (1980) as Sacharias, le conservateur
- The Umbrella Coup (1980) as Salvatore Bozzoni
- Signé Furax (1981) as Grigor Sokolodovenko
- Le retour des bidasses en folie (1983) as Kolonel von Berg
- One Deadly Summer (1983) as Henri a.k.a. 'Henri IV'
- Le jeune marié (1983) as Mr. Santoni, Nina's father
- Les malheurs d'Octavie (1983) as André Perlin
- L'émir préfère les blondes (1983) as Sam Moreau
- Y a-t-il un pirate sur l'antenne? (1983) as commissioner Keller
- Le diable rose (1988) as General Von Goteborg
- Les Gauloises blondes (1988) as Cuchulain
- La folle journée ou Le mariage de Figaro (1989) as Don Guzman Brid'Oison
- Comédie d'amour (1989) as doctor
- 1001 Nights (1990) as The Great Vizier
- My Man (1996) as Passerby In Hat

== Bibliography ==
- Carel, Roger; Henri, Marc (1986). J'avoue que j'ai bien ri (Jean-Claude Lattès ed.).
