= Dude, That's My Ghost! =

British-French Animated series

- French: Mon Pote le fantôme
- Genre: Animated sitcom; Comedy horror; Supernatural; Urban fantasy
- Created by: Jan Van Rijsselberge
- Directed by: Frédéric Martin
- Voices of: Rasmus Hardiker; Darren Foreman; Alex Kelly; Teresa Gallagher; Larissa Murray; Steve Kynman
- Composers: Marc Tomasi; Mehdi Elmorabit
- Countries of origin: France; United Kingdom
- Original language: English
- No. of seasons: 1
- No. of episodes: 52

Production
- Executive producer: Pierre Belaisch
- Producers: Heath Kenny; Jean-Pierre Quenet
- Editors: David Courtil; Cédric Chauveau; Jérôme Etter
- Running time: 11 minutes
- Production companies: Alphanim; Snipple Animation; Cofanim; Backup Films

Original release
- Network: Orange Cinema Series (France); Disney XD (United Kingdom)
- Release: 2 February – 15 December 2013

Dude, That's My Ghost! (French: Mon Pote le fantôme) is a British-French animated television series created by Jan Van Rijsselberge, produced by Alphanim in association with Snipple Animation, Cofanim and Backup Films with the participation of Orange Cinema Series, and directed by Frédéric Martin. The series aired on Disney XD in the United Kingdom and Orange Cinema Series in France. The series was created and designed by Jan Van Rijsselberge, creator of X-DuckX and Robotboy. 52 eleven-minute episodes were produced. The show premiered on 2 February 2013 on Disney XD.

== Plot ==
For Spencer Wright, a 14-year-old budding filmmaker, Beverly Heights is the ultimate goal. Being the new kid at a high school populated by Hollywood royalty, he's an outsider with no ticket in. He's the kid who gets his allowance in cash, not stock options; finding himself amid all this bling and stardom is intimidating. He's got an all-access pass in the form of his best friend, the ghost of famous pop star Billy Joe Cobra.

== Characters ==
- Spencer Wright (voiced by Olivier Podesta in French and Rasmus Hardiker in English) - Spencer is the 14-year-old protagonist of the series. He is a budding filmmaker and makes his own amateur films on a regular basis. He aspires to be a famous film director. Spencer is a particular fan of horror films, with nearly all of his own homemade films having to do with either zombies, serial killers, demons, or monsters in some way. Spencer wears a blue guitar pick necklace that used to belong to Billy in order to see him. Because he is fairly new to Beverly Heights and is very different from the norm (in that he isn't wealthy, trendy, or the "Hollywood type") he has garnered a number of enemies (Principal Ponzi, Lolo, and Kleet) although he receives help dealing with them from Billy and is actually able to fit in with other people. Likewise, Spencer helps Billy by protecting him from his enemies, like Madame X and Hoover. He also normally has to help solve problems caused by Billy as well, mostly pertaining to the effects of his ectoplasm and/or general antics.
- Billy Joe Cobra (voiced by Christophe Lemoine in French and Darren Foreman in English) - He is a funny, mischievous ghost and best friend of Spencer, as well as his distant relative/cousin. Before he died, he was an extremely famous pop star, and is still very popular posthumously. He can not be seen or heard by others unless they wear a personal item that belonged to him before his death (for example, the necklace worn by Spencer). Billy's personality consists of both a bro-centric best friend and a stereotypical narcissistic celebrity. He tries to help Spencer with his films and more to fit into life in Hollywood, although many of his efforts usually cause more problems. He often describes his days as a rock star, in which it is shown that he was extremely difficult to work with (showing up to a video shoot 2 days late and refusing to perform because he didn't like the camera man's jeans), loved to trash hotel rooms and wreck music video shoots, and treated his crew and staff horribly. He can also be somewhat temperamental, especially when someone insults him or his music. Nearly every one of Billy's songs involve him singing about how much he loves himself or how much everyone else loves him ("I'm Still in Love with Me", "I Am the Sunshine of My Life", "You Love Me, I Love Me More", etc.) although sometimes they are about things related to stereotypically extravagant lifestyles ("Big Yachts and Money"). Billy is extremely wealthy: possessing a custom limo, several private jets, planes, and yachts, a pet crocodile, and the large mansion that Spencer's family now live in.

== Broadcast ==
The show was first broadcast in 2013 on Disney XD in United Kingdom. A few months after its original release, it premiered on Disney XD in Turkey and the Middle East and on Disney XD in Latin America on August 22 2013. By 2015, it had broadcast in Canada on BBC Kids. As of 13 November 2020, the series is available in its entirety on Disney+ in various European countries.

== Episodes ==
Note: All episodes in the entire series are directed by Frédéric Martin.

No.	Title	Written by	British air date
1	"Scaring Mallory" "(Mallory croit aux fantômes)"	Jeffrey Paul Kearney	2 February 2013
When Billy scares Mallory enough to make her consider moving out of town, Spencer must try and convince her to stay.
2	"Billy Joe Cobra Museum" "(Le Musée de Billy Joe Cobra)"	Frédéric Martin	2 February 2013
To raise money, Spencer turns the mansion into the Billy Joe Cobra museum, but runs into problems when Billy Joe becomes annoyed by the guests.
3	"Billy Joe the Scholar" "(Billy Joe l'écolier)"	Frédéric Martin	3 February 2013
Spencer runs into trouble when he takes advantage of Billy by tricking him into doing his homework.
4	"Cuckoo's Nest"	Jeffrey Paul Kearney	3 February 2013
Spencer has to make sure everything in his house is normal when he's faced with expulsion for being weird.
5	"School of Rockers" "(Rock au lycée)"	Frédéric Martin & Peter Saisselin	9 February 2013
Spencer runs into trouble during the school's talent contest.
6	"How to Impress Ladies"	Fabrice Ziolkowski & Hervé Nadler	9 February 2013
Billy helps Spencer find a date to the Shorty Awards.
7	"The Ghost of Spencer Wright" "(Le Fantôme de Spencer)"	Peter Saisselin	10 February 2013
Billy turns Spencer into a ghost.
8	"Axe Maniac"	Frédéric Martin	10 February 2013
Billy feels neglected when Spencer pays more attention to a new video game than to him.
9	"Sports Hero"	Peter Saisselin	16 February 2013
Spencer tries to become more popular by being a sports star so people will notice his films.
10	"Biopic Trap"	Mélanie Duval & Léonie de Rudder	16 February 2013
Spencer has to find a way to save his reputation when he's forced to direct a biography of Principal Ponzi.
11	"Pool Monster" "(Un poisson nommé Cobra)"	Matthieu Choquet	17 February 2013
When Billy's ectoplasm contaminates Spencer's goldfish, it mutates into a piranha that the two must dispose from the family pool.
12	"The Uninvited"	Matthieu Choquet	17 February 2013
Spencer has to find a way to get rid of Kleet after Jessica develops a crush on him.
13	"Billy Joe's Last Fan" "(Fan de Billy)"	Frédéric Martin & Jeffrey Paul Kearney	23 February 2013
Hoover pretends to be a fan of Billy in order to capture him.
14	"Let's Do Lunch"	Eddy Fluchon	23 February 2013
Spencer pretends to be an accomplished director in order to get a big-time movie producer to hire him.
15	"Billy Do Joe" "(Kung fu Cobra)"	Eddy Fluchon	24 February 2013
Spencer's attempt at a kung fu film goes awry when he casts Kleet as the villain.
16	"Billy Blob" "(Billy bulle)"	Pascal Stervinou	24 February 2013
Spencer uses a blob of gum mutated by Billy's ectoplasm in his new movie, but has to stop it when it begins expanding and swallowing everything in sight.
17	"True Party" "(L'Anniversaire de Rajeev)"	Mélanie Duval, Léonie de Rudder, Hervé Nadler	2 March 2013
Spencer throws a birthday party for Rajeev on Billy's private jet.
18	"Phantom of the Popera"	Hervé Nadler	2 March 2013
Spencer lies to Billy in order to attend a pop star's concert and hang out with Mallory.
19	"Rock 'n' Home"	Stéphane Melchior-Durand	3 March 2013
Spencer has to prove to his parents that he is responsible enough to stay home alone.
20	"Ghost Mascot"	Lorian Delman, Alexandre Manneville, Matthieu Choquet	3 March 2013
Spencer tries out for the school's wrestling team in order to avoid being put in Principal Ponzi's aerobics class.
21	"Best Day Ever" "(Une journée de folie)"	Peter Saisselin	20 April 2013
Spencer and Billy team up to make a music video, but their creative differences quickly lead to them turning against each other.
22	"Trouble with Hairy" "(La Photo de classe)"	Jeffrey Paul Kearney	21 April 2013
Billy's ectoplasm-smeared fur coat turns Spencer into a werewolf, and it's picture day at school.
23	"School of Terror"	Matthieu Choquet	27 April 2013
Spencer cooks up a scheme to get Ponzi fired, but the new principal turns out to be even worse.
24	"Where's Wendy" "(Le Croco de Cobra)"	Stéphane Melchior-Durand & Jeffrey Paul Kearney	28 April 2013
When Spencer arranges for Billy's former pet miniature crocodile to be brought home from the zoo, the pet turns out not to be miniature at all – and has its sights set on Hugh.
25	"The Candidate"	Mélanie Duval & Léonie de Rudder	4 May 2013
When Lolo runs for class president, promising to put Spencer and his friends in a loser trailer if she's elected, Spencer has no choice but to run against her.
26	"For the Birds" "(Sauvez les oiseaux)"	Anetta Zucchi & Sylvie Barro	5 May 2013
When Spencer has to compete against Lolo to sell the most candy for charity, he makes the mistake of accepting Billy's help, with hilarious but disastrous results.
27	"Little Billy" "(Mini Billy)"	Mélanie Duval, Léonie de Rudder, Jeffrey Paul Kearney	11 May 2013
When Billy unwittingly turns a vintage Billy doll into a voodoo doll, then Ponzi gets a hold of it, bad things start happening to Billy.
28	"Lolo in Love" "(Mélodie pour Lola)"	Stéphane Melchior-Durand	12 May 2013
Billy helps Rajeev win Lolo's affection by teaching him one of his songs which has amazing love powers. Things go wrong when Lolo accidentally hears Spencer singing it instead.
29	"Billy's Achilles"	Emmanuel Keravec	18 May 2013
When Billy discovers that Madame X is no longer interested in capturing him, as she's moved onto healthier pursuits, he goes on a desperate search for a new obsessed fan.
30	"Reality Showdown" "(Télé Lola)"	Mélanie Duval & Léonie de Rudder	19 May 2013
Spencer convinces his family to be on a reality show, thinking it will be good publicity for his movies, but is unpleasantly surprised to find the show's producer is Lolo.
31	"A Place in the Sun" "(Le Roi de l'école)"	Mirabelle Maila Kirkland, Sébastien Oursel, Guillaume Mautalent	25 May 2013
When Spencer stands up to Lolo and unwittingly becomes the new "king of the school", he finds that power corrupts.
32	"Copycat Cobra" "(L'Usurpateur)"	Sophie Lodwitz & Frédéric Martin	26 May 2013
Another ghost, who's a huge Billy fan, shows up at the mansion to hang out with his idol, and won't take no for an answer.
33	"Bad Publicity" "(Spenstar)"	Matthieu Choquet	7 September 2013
Spencer makes a deal with a famous Hollywood publicist in order to gain exposure for his movies, but has to rescue Billy when she ends up capturing him.
34	"Soccer Star" "(Dans la peau de Kleet)"	Jeffrey Paul Kearney	7 September 2013
When Billy hears how popular pro-athletes can be, he possesses Kleet's body to try to get some fame, but his egotistical on-field antics land him in huge trouble.
35	"Billy, Billy, Billy, Billy, Billy" "(Billy Billy Billy Billy)"	Emmanuel Keravec & Jeffrey Paul Kearney	8 September 2013
Billy clones himself in order to finish a new song quickly, but when he and his clones spend the whole time goofing off, Spencer has to find a way to get the song finished or risk being labeled a fraud.
36	"And the Winner Is..."	Anetta Zucchi, Sylvie Barro, Eddy Fluchon	8 September 2013
Spencer tries to sneak into the Fame Awards to see his movie idol win after Ponzi sentences him to after-school detention.
37	"House Haunts" "(La Maison hantée)"	Maīté Demoulin	14 September 2013
Spencer loses his necklace and can't see Billy anymore, but still has to find a way to stop Hoover when his parents decide to hire a ghost hunter.
38	"House of Horrors" "(La Maison de l'horreur)"	Emmanuel Keravec & Jeffrey Paul Kearney	14 September 2013
Spencer turns the mansion into a huge haunted house for a Halloween contest, but when Billy accidentally merges with the house, it becomes a real horror fest.
39	"The Blair Wright Project" "(Le Projet Blair Wright)"	Jeffrey Paul Kearney	15 September 2013
Hugh takes Spencer and Rajeev into the desert for a camping trip, but the boys' plan to shoot a horror movie there goes awry when Billy's ectoplasm turns Hugh into a real monster.
40	"Zombie Love" "(Le Zombie romantique)"	Simon Lecocq & Emmanuel Keravec	15 September 2013
Spencer has to save everyone in his school when Billy's ectoplasm-filled cologne turns them into love-happy zombies.
41	"Summertime Rules!" "(Job d'été)"	Frédéric Martin	21 September 2013
Spencer has to find a way to keep his summer job as head towel boy at the Beverly Beach Club when Ponzi tricks him into driving away all the guests.
42	"Merman" "(L'Homme-poisson)"	Frédéric Martin	21 September 2013
Rajeev turns into a merman after Billy adds some ectoplasm to his muscle cream, and a jealous Spencer attempts to steal some of the resulting spotlight for himself.
43	"Escape from Beverly Beverly High" "(Braquage à Beverly Beverly High)"	Matthieu Choquet & Frédéric Martin	22 September 2013
Spencer gets accepted into the Beverly Film Academy, but enlists Lolo, Kleet, and iStevie's help in retrieving his transcript when Ponzi locks it up in a high-security vault.
44	"The Substitute" "(La Remplaçante)"	Heath Kenny & Jeffrey Paul Kearney	22 September 2013
Spencer has to protect Billy at school when Hoover poses as a new substitute teacher, but gets some additional help from Principal Ponzi.
45	"Three's a Crowd"	Frédéric Martin	28 September 2013
When Spencer encourages Billy and Rajeev to keep each other company while he's away, the two become best buddies and make Spencer feel like the odd man out.
46	"Cheer Up" "(Pom Pom Hugh)"	Mélanie Duval, Léonie de Rudder, Peter Saisselin	28 September 2013
Hugh becomes coach of the Beverly Beverly High cheer squad and when he's injured, passes the job on to a reluctant Spencer.
47	"Ponzi's Got Talent" "(Ponzi a un incroyable talent)"	Frédéric Martin	29 September 2013
Spencer tries to get Ponzi to pursue his lost dream of being a great ribbon dancer, in the hope that he'll quit his job and leave Spencer in peace.
48	"The Sleepover" "(Où est Billy ?)"	Peter Saisselin & Frédéric Martin	29 September 2013
Spencer, Rajeev and Shanila wake up in the middle of the night at a school-sponsored sleepover, with no memory of the night's events and Billy missing.
49	"The Hat" "(Le Chapeau magique)"	Hervé Nadler & Frédéric Martin	7 December 2013
Billy gives Spencer a magical hat that allows him to gain confidence. When everyone overhears about it, they'll stop at no cost to get the hat from whoever possesses it.
50	"Evil Wig" "(La Perruque infernale)"	Stéphane Melchior-Durand	14 December 2013
When some of Billy's ectoplasm gets soaked into Principal Ponzi's wig, It causes it to become evil, and it's up to Billy and Spencer to get rid of it.
51	"The Wright Kind of Christmas" "(Joyeuse Saint Wright)"	Frédéric Martin	15 December 2013
When Hugh reminds Spencer that their family tradition, known as Wrightmas, starts today, Spencer is desperate in attempts to hopefully not participate in the event.
52	"Evil Billy" "(La Bataille des cheveux)"	Frédéric Martin	8 December 2013
Billy fears that he'll lose his hair. In attempts to prevent it, he uses a hair machine which causes side effects to turn him evil.

== See also ==
- List of ghost films
