= The Magic Snowflake =

- Theatrical release poster
- French: L'Apprenti Père Noël et le flocon magique
- Directed by: Luc Vinciguerra
- Written by: Alexandre Révérend
- Based on: SantApprentice by Jan Van Rijsselberge
- Produced by: Pierre Belaisch
- Starring: see below
- Edited by: Soline Guyonneau
- Music by: Robert Marcel Lepage
- Production companies: Gaumont Animation; Snipple Animation; DaCapo Productions; Telepool; Cofimage 23; Devanim-Backup Media
- Distributed by: Gaumont
- Release date: November 20, 2013 (France)
- Running time: 73 minutes
- Countries: France; Belgium
- Language: French

The Magic Snowflake (original French title L'Apprenti Père Noël et le flocon magique) is a 2013 animated Christmas adventure comedy film and a standalone sequel to the 2010 animated film Santa's Apprentice based on the television series SantApprentice created by Jan Van Rijsselberge. The film was made by Gaumont Animation, co-produced with Snipple Animation and DaCapo Productions.

== Plot ==
The movie opens where a little boy writes a letter to Santa Claus that he wants a remote control flying bug and mails it to the North Pole. At the North Pole, an Inuk (Eskimo) boy named Tim-Tim picks up the mail to deliver it to Santa's Workshop. Beatrice Lovejoy, Santa's wife, picks up the mail, but she won't allow Tim-Tim to take a peek inside. As Santa is about to make his rounds, Mrs. Lovejoy closes the roof and reminds Santa to celebrate his retirement in Sydney, Australia. As Santa gives Santa's robe and hat to Nicholas, Beatrice and all the elves congratulate him on being the new Santa. After Santa and Mrs. Lovejoy leave, Nicholas takes over the workshop and receives a letter from the little boy who wanted a remote control flying bug. Tim-Tim secretly enters the workshop and Beatrice notices him and decides to show him around. Nicholas asks Tim-Tim why is he in the workshop and asks him to leave, but Beatrice decides to show him around the workshop. On board the airplane, Santa worries about Nicholas as Mrs. Lovejoy convinces to Santa to remind of himself of something. He pulls his blue bunny toy and holds it to his heart.

When Nicholas woke up the next morning, the white hair appears on his face. He gets rid of it by shaving, but the white hair reappears. He attempts making a remote control flying bug, which turns out to be a fiery bee and causes it to damage the workshop a bit as the elves stopped it. He told Beatrice about what happened, and he saw Tim-Tim again and his voice deepens as he felt what happened and angrily tells Tim-Tim to leave, and then he left through Rufus's door. Beatrice saw what happened to Nicholas as she goes with Waldorf to a room to ring the emergency bell to call the Council of Retired Santas to explain what happened. At the Daffodil Orphanage, Santa and Mrs. Lovejoy meets with the Director of the Orphanage Mr. Ratchet and Santa asks him for a job, but Mr. Ratchet refuses the offer and asks Santa to leave. Santa hears something at the Orphanage fireplace, and he goes up there and lands in Santa's workshop.

Santa returns and takes Nicholas to the basement to find that the magic snowflake was melted. They see the Council of Retired Santas arrive as Nicholas and Beatrice explain what happened to Santa. Santa tells Nicholas that he has Grown-up-itis. Beatrice and Santa ask the Victorian Santa to take over the workshop until Nicholas is cured. Santa and Nicholas go to the snow field as Nicholas sees a door marked 24. Santa explains to Nicholas that it is the advent calendar doors, and only Nicholas can see it with his eyes. Nicholas enters door 24, and he sees himself in the future as a tyrannical corporate executive who makes products designed to make kids grow up faster. Nicholas and Rufus find a hamster marked 7 as they exit door 24.

Meanwhile, at Santa's workshop, Beatrice shows Victorian Santa a handheld game, and he realizes that it does not exist in Victorian era. He expresses disdain at all the other modern toys kids that are now being made and decides to do something about it. Back at the advent calendar, Nicholas shows Santa a hamster with the number 7 and says that it is the next door to enter. He then enters door 7 and meets with Tim-Tim and his mother, who is the Shaman of the Eskimo Village. The Shaman explains to Nicholas he is to find door 3 near bear mountain that leads to the past. Nicholas tells Santa about the last door to enter near bear mountain, then Nicholas sees door 1. Santa warns Nicholas not to enter the door, but Nicholas ignores Santa's warning and enters it anyway. Seeing baby Nicholas with his parents boarding a ship, Nicholas tries to stop them, but it was too late. After he exits door 1, the advent calendar doors collapse as Nicholas now has a beard and Santa asks Nicholas that door 3 still works if he can find it. So Nicholas and Rufus go to bear mountain on their own to find door 3 as Santa returns to Daffodil Orphanage.

Back at Santa's workshop, Victorian Santa converts toys to bricks and Beatrice notices this and asks the Victorian Santa why, he explains to Beatrice that kids will use their imaginations with bricks for anything they can come up with. He then locks Beatrice in a toy production room until after Christmas Eve so that she will not stop him. Back at the Orphanage, Santa picks up the bunny to entertain Zoe, a little girl at the orphanage, until Mr. Ratchet sees this and Santa takes Mr. Ratchet and Zoe to the fireplace through the tunnels to the ship at the North Pole. Mr. Ratchet knows how to steer the ship. They finally arrive at Santa's workshop and seeing Victorian Santa making bricks instead of toys and tries to convince him to revert it, but Victorian Santa refuses, and he locks up Santa, Mr. Ratchet, and Zoe in the toy production room as Waldorf barely escapes and goes to find Nicholas.

Meanwhile, Nicholas and Rufus arrive at bear mountain by moonlight. Nicholas runs and slides down the snow and his beard is starting to fade away as the magic snowflake is restored, and the spirit fairies fly to bear mountain. He finally arrives at bear mountain, and the magic snowflake spirit fairies reveal the bear and take Nicholas to the base of bear mountain. The bear reveals door 3 as he hears Waldorf calling. Nicholas finally enters door 3 and sees himself when he was 3-years-old at the orphanage. Nicholas figures out that his Teddy bear was a toy that Santa gave to him when he was 3-years-old. At the toy production room of Santa's Workshop, Santa entertains and gives a bunny to Zoe and Mr. Ratchet sees how thoughtful Santa was to Zoe. Santa knew that it was his glowing heart that was the bonding connection. Back at the orphanage in the past, Nicholas hugs his teddy bear to his heart and gives it back to his 3-year-old self and exits door 3. At last, Nicholas's Grown-up-itis is cured as Nicholas and Rufus ride on Waldorf to Tim-Tim's igloo in the Eskimo Village and the Shaman congratulates Nicholas upon succeeding in his tasks. Nicholas invites Tim-Tim to Santa's workshop and apologizes for yelling. Nicholas, Tim-Tim, Rufus, and Waldorf head to Santa's Workshop as Tim-Tim distract the elves. Then, Nicholas unlocks the door to the toy production room with his pencil as a lock pick and explains everything to Santa. Victorian Santa notices this and locks them in the toy production room as well, along with Tim-Tim.

Nicholas comes up with a plan to make the little boy's Christmas wish come true, so Nicholas makes a remote control butterfly and uses a pencil as a lock pick attached to the butterfly to unlock the door of the toy production room. As they are freed at last, Nicholas rides on Waldorf to stop the Victorian Santa. When Nicholas sees Victorian Santa, he convinces him to change his ways and makes him turn around back to the workshop. Nicholas collapses, and Victorian Santa is stricken with remorse. Eventually, Nicholas is revived with the butterfly wings that he made for the child who wrote the letter at the start of the movie, and the sleigh returns to the workshop.

Nicholas, Beatrice, Humphrey, and Santa convert the bricks back into toys only to find that there are 2 hours left to make the Christmas delivery around the world. Nicholas convinces them to use the butterfly wings to speed things up. They make a speedy Christmas delivery around the world and deliver the remote control butterfly to the child who wanted it for Christmas. Everything is successful as Nicholas now allows children to visit at Santa's Workshop. Victorian Santa has kept his promise and provides Christmas dinner to Santa, Nicholas, Beatrice, Mr. Ratchet, Zoe, Waldorf, Humphrey and Tim-Tim. Mrs. Lovejoy enters the room and figures out why Santa was not in Sydney. Santa explains to Mrs. Lovejoy about the events that had happened. Mr. Ratchet sees what Santa did all along and finally offers Santa the job to run the Orphanage. Everyone, including, Mrs. Lovejoy, enjoys Christmas Dinner. At the basement, the retired Santas are still playing a choosing game under the magic snowflake.

== Cast ==
Voice cast
Character	French	English	
Character	French	Canada/ DaCapo Productions	United States/ Weinstein Company
Nicholas Barnsworth	Nathan Simony	Tristan Mackid	Cole Sand
Nicholas Barnsworth (adult)		Robyn Slade	Tim Bandfield
Santa Claus	Benoît Allemane	Laurie Mustard	Michael Sorich
Beatrice Lovejoy		Dorothy Carroll	Bailey Gambertoglio
Beatrice Lovejoy (adult)		Gloria Nikkel	Cheryl Chase
Mrs. Claus		Gloria Nikkel	Mary Pat Gleason
Mr. Ratchet	Jean-Claude Donda	Gary Jarvis	Richard Steven Horvitz
Humphrey		Brian Cook	Andy Morris
Waldorf	Alexis Tomassian	Geoff Hughes	Richard Tatum
Rufus (grunts)	Céline Melloul	Robyn Slade	Jerni Stewart
Tim-Tim	Kylian Trouillard	N.E. Infante Neal	Paulette Victor-Lifton
Shaman		Jolie L'Esperance	Mari Devon
Zoe		N.E. Infante Neal	Jerni Stewart
Mrs. Palmer			Fabiana Arrastia
Constable Stevens			Terrence Stone
Hugo		Parker Lauzon	Fabian Arrastia
Polar Bear Spirit		Ian Mikita	Philip Williams
Victorian Santa		Bernard Boland	Robert Cait
Contrary Santa		Kevin Aichele	Michael Sorich
Grumpy Santa		Corny Rempel	Terrence Stone
Insane Santa		Nolan Balzer	Robert Cait
Scottish Santa			Terrence Stone
Absent-minded Santa		Pete Hudson	Robert Cait
Jokey Santa		Gene Pryz	Terrence Stone
Circus performer		Heather Madill	Paulette Victor-Lifton
Elves		Ben Robson; Clinton Skibitzky; Daniel Roa; Laura Kolysnyk; Nolan Balzer; Robyn Slade	Fabiana Arrastia; Paulette Victor-Lifton; Terrence Stone
Employees		Charlene Van Buekenhout; Corny Rempel; Davide Montebruno; Heather Madill; Murray Farnell; Tim Bandfield	
Tourists		Ben Robson; Bernard Boland; Heather Madill; Robyn Slade	

== Release ==
The Magic Snowflake was first released in France on 20 November 2013. The English version had a limited release in Canada on 30 November 2013.

The film was released in the United States and was planned for release in the U.K. by The Weinstein Company. On December 20, 2015, The Magic Snowflake was available on Netflix in the United States.

== Home media ==
The Magic Snowflake was released on DVD in the United States on 1 November 2016 as a double feature with Santa's Apprentice.

On 19 February 2019, the film was released on Blu-ray in the United States.

== See also ==
- List of Christmas films
- Santa Claus in film
