= Hairy Scary =

- Created by: Jan Van Rijsselberge
- Directed by: Wolf-Rüdiger Bloss
- Voices of: Samantha Shaw; Candida Gubbins; Felicity Duncan; Jo Lee; Nick Haverson; Matt Devereaux; Stephen Bent; John Vernon; Stuart Organ; Stuart Milligan
- Composers: Laurent Cayol; François Monfeuga; Jacques Bastello; Olivier Lanneluc; Christian Lacrampe
- Country of origin: France
- Original languages: English; French
- No. of episodes: 52

Production
- Producers: Christian Davin; Clément Calvet
- Running time: 12 minutes
- Production companies: Alphanim; Europool; Shanghai Cartoon Communication Group; Village Productions

Original release
- Network: France 3
- Release: 2008 – 2012

Hairy Scary is an animated television series created by Jan Van Rijsselberge and produced by Alphanim for France 3 and Super RTL. The series is centered on two kids – a “Hairy” boy, Willow, and a “Scary” girl, Constance – and their adventures in a fantastical and sometimes confusing world of misconceptions and misunderstandings. Along with a bunch of pretty assertive schoolmates, they figure out all sorts of important things such as friendship stronger than prejudice and acceptance of difference.

== Synopsis ==
Hairies are mostly about feelings and Scaries are mostly about thinking. Hairies are like playful dogs and Scaries are like playful cats. (Or vice versa.) None of these differences get in their way of being close neighbours. But if you really want to know Hairies and Scaries all you have to do is meet Willow and Constance. They’re two regular kids in an irregular world. Willow's a Hairy boy and Constance is a Scary girl. Willow loves adventure and greets each day with enthusiasm. Constance loves having a plan and likes to stick to the rules. Willow is always getting himself in trouble and Constance is always getting him out of it. Which makes Junior very, very unhappy. Junior is a scheming Scary classmate who is totally enamoured with Constance. He sees Willow as a rival for her heart (even though she can’t stand him) and he works tirelessly to find ways to embarrass and thwart Willow. Naturally, he never wins. Will he ever learn?

== The Heroes ==
- Willow is a cheery Hairy who greets each day as the start of an adventure. He believes no problem is too big or too complex to solve. He's the kid who stands up when everyone else sits down, goes out of his way to be nice and supportive, gives gifts to his friends to see them smile. Directions, rules and textbooks aren’t for Willow who’d rather learn by “doing”. His cheery, can-do attitude pulls him through any problem Junior throws his way.
- Constance is a Scary who's got a good head on her shoulders – even though she's the clumsiest kid around. You can always count on her to trip, hit her head in a doorway or break something important. But, above all else, Constance is a loyal friend. You can count on her to always do the right thing.
- Junior is a scary Scary. He moves fast, speaks fast and thinks fast. He thinks Constance is the most beautiful Scary ever and is convinced that she has a crush on him. Every insult Constance throws at him, he takes as a compliment. He can see that Constance likes Willow and that makes Willow Junior's number one rival.
- Plug & Doug: Junior's cousins and sidekicks, Plug & Doug aren’t the most astute guys to have on your side. They’re pretty much two twins with one brain. Separate them and they get lost and into trouble. But because they’re family, Junior has no choice but to rehire them and use them in his future schemes to thwart Willow.
- Daffodil is Willow's best friend. As worried as a grandmother, Daffodil is all about safety. “Code Red!” He’ll scream at the first sign of danger. Trouble is, he’ll often complicate things and make them more dangerous by pointing out how unsafe they are.
- Ernest is Constance's younger brother. Unlike his sister, he's not book smart or interested in knowing everything. Rather, he likes to know just enough to get by. He often wears big, black sunglasses to show off how cool he is. Ernest gets involved in anything he thinks would make a good deal. He joins a band, learns a language, and tries a new sport. Although he is friends with Willow and the others, he usually “works” on his own. But every “loner” needs help and company now and then.
- Willow's trusted pet Ulu, Zig, of course can’t talk but he's listening and helping Willow in his own Ulu way. Willow may love his pet, but most Scaries and Hairies don’t like Ulu's because they are clumsy – always knocking things over and breaking things.
- Shush is Constance's best friend. She has a “no filter brain” and says what's on her mind the moment it pops in. She sure keeps things lively, especially in touchy situations. Shush is also a fashion junky, always looking for a “new look” to keep up with the trends.
- Big Kahuna, the School Principal. Cool, relaxed with a deep, low voice. If he lived in our world, he’d be a fan of Jerry Garcia (Grateful Dead). But in Hairy Scary, he's a favourite of the kids. A trusted principal who also coaches the team and isn’t against having fun too.
- Mr. Sap is a teacher who really bends over backwards to be nice. Pathetically nice. He apologizes for everything. “Sorry about the test, kids. Sorry about the homework. Gee that makes me feel bad.” Aside from teaching, he's also an inventor and loves to show Willow & Constance his latest inventions. Do they work? Most times, no. And the results can be dreadfully funny.
- Rttz (pronounce: R, double-T, Zed) is the Police chief and Junior's dad. The police chief who takes his job very seriously and is a firm believer in “Crime & Punishment”. He's number one nemesis is Rubber Bob, the thief who always gets away – but who also never manages to steal anything successfully, either! As a father, Rttz is stern with Junior if sometimes easily duped by him. Key phrase: “Crime & Punishment”.
- The Premier is the town mayor and Constance's uncle. A nice, friendly fellow who loves Golf and a long vacation. You’d never mistake him for a politician. He's more like your favourite granddad, a little befuddled but kind hearted.
- Pal Pitt is the town heartthrob and teen idol for all the girls at school. Actor, announcer, celebrity. Even Constance falls under his spell. Pal Pitt got his name because he makes your heart palpitate. He is young, cool and has one patch of hair on his chin that the girls swoon over. In their hearts and minds, Pal can do nothing wrong. The boys can’t say the same.
- Rubber Bob is the resident master thief, or so he thinks. Rubber Bob is intent on being the greatest thief of all time. The greatest thief in the universe! Speaking in a French accent, Rubber Bob records everything he does in his personal hand-held recorder. Referring to himself in the third person, Rubber Bob says “He is formidable!”.
- Bunn (Willow's Mom), often called Honey-Bunn by her husband, works at the Department of Education. She's very touchy-feely and is in charge of fostering new ways to learn. She’ll often come up with odd ways of doing things. “ Let’s hold hands and hug before we begin.” Willow can’t stand it. But what's a son to do?
- Willow's dad, Buzz, works at the Hairy Hair Products Commission and does quality control on Hairy hair products. Buzz is also active in his son's life. Sometimes too active. He's always signing him and Willow up for father/son outings in the hopes of bonding with his son. Trouble is, Willow would rather hang out with his buddies. But what's a son to do?

== List of episodes ==
1. Blowing in the Wind - Willow discovers that Hairies puff when they get excited or nervous. He tries to stay cool and overcome his stage fright in a school play.
2. Pen Pal - Daffodil writes his Pen Pal "Fiona" that he is the coolest kid in school. When she comes for a visit he panics and asks Willow to pretend to be him.
3. Crazy Cartoons - Junior sends out mean drawings to everyone in town using Willow's e-mail address.
4. Hairy Formula - Because of an accident during science class, Junior grows hair on the day of the school photo.
5. Hairy Spell - Daffodil and Willow almost miss the school spelling bee when Junior gives them a pacifier which hypnotizes them.
6. Courage Daffodil - Daffodil tries to find courage by using the hair of Willow's pet “Zig”.
7. Niak Niak - Willow finds a strange little animal called “Niak, Niak”. When he brings it to school, the creature causes havoc.
8. Tic Toc Doom - Willow is possessed by a watch that Junior gives him.
9. The Friendship Test - When Willow casually assumes Constance will invite him to the school dance, Constance decides to give Willow a Friendship Test in the hopes he won’t take her for granted.
10. Driving Me Crazy - Willow is getting ready for his drivers test. Junior pretends to help him with the intention to make him fail.
11. Working Overtime - Willow wants to buy a new XO-Flyer scooter and takes an after-school job to earn some money. Junior tries to stop him.
12. Pesky Boolu - Constance asks Willow to pet sit her Boolu-bird. But the creature hates Willow and attacks.
13. Junior Makes Peace - Junior pretends to be good friends with Willow in order to mess up his room so he would miss the school dance.
14. Who's the Best? - Ernest gets injured during a Punch Ball game. Junior & Willow compete for the vacant position on the team.
15. On the Ropes - Willow tries to get an autograph from his favourite wrestler. Junior tricks him and Willow finds himself in the wrestling ring facing the menacing Bust-a-Gut!
16. Grandma's Louella - Willow's grandmother Louella falls in love with Rttz. Willow & Junior work together in order to break them up.
17. The Best Birth-Minute Ever - Willow is desperately trying to find the perfect birthday-gift for Constance. Junior offers his help with the intention to ruin it for Willow.
18. The Hunk - When Shush hits her head, she mistakes Junior for Pal Pitt, her heartthrob TV actor.
19. Nice Boy - Junior becomes a mindless dunce after an extraterrestrial parasite attaches itself to his head. Plug & Doug are in charge to retrain him.
20. Jack Pot - Junior squanders Plug & Doug's lottery winnings.
21. The Games People Play - Ernest enters the "PRISM" competition, a poker-type game, and ends up competing against his teacher Ms. Lilac.
22. The Fan - Mr. Sap's nerdy nephew "Baylor" becomes Willow's biggest fan and makes Willow's life miserable.
23. Prison Break - Rttz captures Rubber Bob only to have the crafty thief escape and fool Rttz again when he robs the bank.
24. 'Matchmakers - Because their grades are falling in Ms. Lilac's, the kids decide to play matchmaker and find her the perfect mate, so she won’t be so hard on them.
25. The Fame Game - Willow's popularity soars after he appears on a silly home video show. Junior gets jealous and tries to film himself doing outrages stunts.
26. Guys Night Out - After embarrassing his son in front of Constance, Buzz decides to take Willow out for a Pizza and to prove to him that he can be cool.
27. Friendship Games - Like crazed soccer dads, Buzz and Rttz put pressure on Willow and Junior when they face off in the yearly “Friendship Games”. To make sure he wins, Junior hires a huge brute who only ends up causing havoc.
28. Calamity Constance - After a series of clumsy accidents, Constance believes she's a menace to society. She decides to get herself locked up, but ends up to be wrongly accused of robbing the bank.
29. Masterpiece - After failing to protect an art exhibit, Rttz repaints the missing pieces himself when he thinks they’ve all been stolen.
30. Happy Fruits - While on a school field trip, the kids accidentally eat the wrong berries and get loopy. Willow & Constance save the day.
31. Pal Pitt Mania - Tired of hearing all the girls swoon over Pal Pitt, the teen heartthrob, Willow and Junior join forces to “unmask” him only to make the girls feel sorry for Pal and love him even more.
32. Identity Theft - Willow & Junior accidentally switch minds and Junior refuses to change back because he’ll be able to go (as Willow) to the class picnic with Constance.
33. Two Beautiful Minds - Plug & Doug become geniuses when a meteor hits them. Junior is lost without his clueless cousins.
34. The Runaways - Plug & Doug are tired of everyone confusing their names and run away only to end up on a train with Rubber Bob, who just stole a giant diamond. Willow & Junior must save them and stop the train!
35. Alien Rescue - Two aliens are looking for a specimen for abduction. After Constance scolds her brother Ernest, he suggests her as a volunteer!
36. Good Luck, Hard Luck - Junior is furious when Willow picks a Good-Luck charm over the latest V-ball-video-game. But when Willow's luck changes for real, Junior wants the charm.
37. Age Crazy - Constance accidentally turns Junior into a 6-year-old brat.
38. Some Like It Hotter - Willow & Daffodil dress up as girls in order to infiltrate Constance's “girls-only-party”.
39. Call to Order - Ipso & Facto, two aliens with the intent on world-domination, implant themselves into Rttz's brain and turn him into a policing tyrant. The kids join forces to save him.
40. Night in the Forest - Willow is ready for his “hairy ritual initiation into manhood” by spending the night in the forest. Junior sets out to make him fail.
41. Helpless - Junior purposely acts hurt to get extra attention and care from Constance. Unfortunately for him, Plug & Doug want to take care of him too.
42. The Whole Truth - When Junior overhears Willow criticize Constance's latest painting, he uses a truth device to make Willow tell Constance the truth, hoping she’ll get upset.
43. Rttz Has Had Enough - After ruining a presentation of the police fleet, Rttz locks himself into jail only to discover he really, really likes it. In the meantime Junior has become Chief of Police and runs the city like a tyrant.
44. Hold Up! - When the kids go to the opening of a new bank to deposit their most precious possessions, they find themselves caught in the middle of a hold up by Rubber Bob.
45. The Treasure of Diamond Butte - When Ernest finds an old Pirate treasure map, the kids go search for the treasure only to be thwarted by Junior. And Junior is then thwarted by a ghost!
46. New Junior - When Junior ruins Constance's dinner party, he vows to become a better person and to be more helpful. Unfortunately, he ends up helping Rubber Bob steal the town's diamond.
47. Robot Pants 3000 - Rubber Bob steals Mr. Sap's latest invention, “The Robbot Pants 3000”, in order to rob the museum. Willow and Constance try to stop him.
48. Junior's Best Day - The aliens Ipso & Facto offer Junior the best day of his life if he agrees to be abducted to their home planet. Willow and Constance have to help Junior to get him out of his contract.
49. Good Bob - Rubber Bob decides to take a break from his life of crime and help people instead. Junior persuades him to pretend to be his mean cousin “Punky” and bully him so everyone will have sympathy for Junior.
50. Kindness Day - Rubber Bob lost his stolen diamond inside a morango-pie, that is being delivered to the pie-eating contest. He is infiltrating the competition in order to recuperate his beloved diamond.
51. Freeze! - Rttz freezes Willow during a presentation of the latest crime-fighting device. When he gets a false emergency call from his son Junior, he rushes off and leaves frozen Willow behind. Constance tries to find Rttz, while Junior uses the situation to spend some quality-time with her.
52. Disappearing Act - Plug & Doug find a discarded invention of Mr. Sap's that makes things disappear. Soon, they make everyone disappear and reappear on a small planet that is slated for destruction by Ipso & Facto.
