= Santa's Apprentice =

- French theatrical release poster
- Directed by: Luc Vinciguerra
- Written by: Alexandre Reverend
- Based on: SantApprentice by Jan Van Rijsselberge
- Produced by: Tanguy Olivier; Sandra Gross
- Starring: Nathan Simony; Benoît Allemane
- Edited by: Celine Kelepikis
- Music by: Nerida Tyson-Chew
- Production companies: Gaumont-Alphanim; Flying Bark Productions Pty. Ltd. Avrill Stark Entertainment; Cartoon Saloon
- Distributed by: Gaumont (France); Becker Film Group (Australia)
- Release date: November 24, 2010
- Running time: 77 minutes
- Countries: France; Australia; Ireland
- Languages: French; English
- Box office: $5 million

Santa's Apprentice (original French title L'Apprenti Père Noel) is a 2010 animated Christmas film produced by Gaumont-Alphanim and Flying Bark Productions in association with Avrill Stark Entertainment and Cartoon Saloon. The film is based on the animated TV series SantApprentice created by Jan Van Rijsselberge.

A stand-alone sequel, titled The Magic Snowflake, was released on 20 November 2013 in France.

== Plot ==
The film opens in Sydney, Australia with Nicholas and his best friend Felix, gazing at the department store window seeing what Santa's workshop looks like. They reside at an orphanage in the Himalayas where all the Children were orphans. The bully, Grincroch, picks on Nicholas that Santa doesn't exist as he asks him that he's afraid of heights. But, Nicholas manages to retrieve a toy for the child after climbing up the orphanage fence. Nicholas was pure of heart believing Christmas and Santa.

On Christmas Eve, Nicholas's best friend Felix, gets adopted by his new parents and gives his lucky charm to Nicholas as Felix with his new parents move to America. During Christmas Eve dinner, Little Beatrice gives some chocolate to Nicholas as he introduced himself to her. Nicholas and Little Beatrice sees a shooting star as Beatrice is to be lucky star to have the dream of best Christmas.

At the North Pole, The Council of Retired Santas convince Santa Claus to appoint his new apprentice that a person must be an orphan whose heart is pure as Santa looks at the globe and found a boy in Sydney, Australia. That night, Humphrey the head elf chooses which boy will become a new Santa. At first, he chose Grincroch but Santa knew that he is not the chosen one. So Santa chooses Nicholas and takes him to the North Pole to train Nicholas to become a new Santa once he retires.

The next day, Nicholas wakes up and meets Mrs. Lovejoy, Santa's wife and receives the little polar bear that Nicholas saw at the department store came to life as a pet and names him Rufus. During the months prior to next Christmas, Nicholas tries his best training hard being his apprentice, learns the secrets from Santa, learn to climb up and go down the chimneys and making toys to deliver to the children of the world on Christmas Eve. Meanwhile in America, Felix and his new parents have financial problems that they can no longer afford their home and they move to a mobile home.

A day before Christmas Eve, the gifts were accidentally set on fire; Santa's beard was burnt as it was Nicholas's fault. But Nicholas manages to clean the toys after he accidentally burned with the fire-cracker toy he made. At the orphanage, Mrs. Poulmer, the caretaker of the orphanage, cheers Little Beatrice up and gives Felix's letter. She knows that Nicholas is Santa's Apprentice. Felix receives a letter from the orphanage and he writes to Nicholas to deliver the message at the North Pole.

Then on Christmas Eve, Nicholas apologizes to Santa and helps him to put more gifts on the sleigh. Nicholas receives the letter from Felix that he wants a new house to live with his parents. Santa now receives a new suit and a beard to look like Santa Claus and takes off to deliver the toys. Nicholas realized that Santa forgot the Magic ball, so Humphrey opens the portal to Santa's sleigh and Nicholas goes to the sleigh and delivers the magic ball to Santa as he forgot what child's name to deliver the toy to. Nicholas asks Santa to remember it with his heart so that he knows what name of a child and a present requested by a child. Santa and Nicholas work together to deliver the toys worldwide and Nicholas gives Felix and his parents a new house to live in next to their mobile home. Felix is happy for Nicholas as they remain best of friends.

Finally, at Sydney, Australia, Nicholas is about to deliver toys at the orphanage but Mrs. Poulmer, found Nicholas safe and sound after he was missing for a year and Inspector Jeff Samson and his men arrests Santa after noticing a fake beard. Little Beatrice tries to cheer Nicholas that Santa will return. Grincroch challenges Nicholas to a duel and takes the magic ball to shrink Mrs. Poulmer, the Children, Little Beatrice and Rufus to an ornament size. Santa convinces the Police officers and Inspector Jeff Samson to prove he was real after his heart was restored and pointing to them that he delivered the toys to them when they were little. Inspector and his men understands and believes what Santa had said to them and they release Santa. After Nicholas and Grincroch battle for the Magic Ball, the Magic Ball fell and Santa retrieves it in the nick of time. Santa convinces Grincroch to stop making fun and picking on children and to learn to love the parents once he is adopted.

Santa and Nicholas use the Magic ball to restore Mrs. Poulmer, the children, Little Beatrice and Rufus back to normal size and Nicholas delivers the presents to the children. Little Beatrice then introduces to Nicholas as she likes Rufus and thought she said something silly about it as she feels something special. Santa adopts Nicholas and takes him back to the North Pole and explaining to Nicholas that once he retires, he will run the orphanage. Santa gives Nicholas a Magic ball so that he can use Christmas Magic. Little Beatrice was stowed in the bag and decides to go to the North Pole with Nicholas that she dreamed of. Nicholas is happy to be Santa's Apprentice as the sleigh flies back to the North Pole.

== Cast ==
Voice cast
Character	French	English	
Character	French	Australia/ Becker Film Group	United States/ Weinstein Company
Nicholas Barnsworth	Nathan Simony	Jack Versace	Cole Sand
Santa Claus	Benoît Allemane	Shane Jacobson	Michael Sorich
Beatrice Lovejoy		Delta Goodrem	Bailey Gambertoglio
Mrs. Claus		Magda Szubanski	Mary Pat Gleason
Humphrey		Max Cullen	Andy Morris
Waldorf		Hugh Sheridan	Richard Tatum
Nicholas Grincroch		Shardyn Fahey-Leigh	Gabe Eggerling
Felix	Valentin Cherbuy	Holly Fraser	Cristina Pucelli
Felix's father	Bruno Salomone	Kristian Schmid	Robert Cait
Felix's mother	Julie Gayet	Jacinta Stapleton	Salli Saffioti
Mrs. Palmer		Georgie Parker	Fabiana Arrastia
Inspector Stevens			Michael Sorich
Constable Gallagher			Robert Cait
Constable Stevens			Terrence Stone
Contrary Santa	Jean-Pierre Marielle	Jim Pike	Michael Sorich
Grumpy Santa		Jim Pike	Terrence Stone
Insane Santa		Jim Pike	Robert Cait
Scottish Santa		Jim Pike	Terrence Stone
Absent-minded Santa		Jim Pike	Robert Cait
Jokey Santa		Jim Pike	Terrence Stone
Nightmare Santa			Michael Sorich
Reindeer		Chris Leaney	Henri Ubatti
Little Boy		Sam Fraser	Cole Caplan

== Release ==
This movie was first released in France on 24 November 2010. The English version was released in Australia on 10 November 2011. This movie was released in the United States and was planning to release in the U.K. by The Weinstein Company. On December 20, 2015, Santa's Apprentice was made available on Netflix in the United States.

=== Home media ===
On 7 November 2012, Santa's Apprentice was released on DVD in Australia by Paramount Home Entertainment. On 1 November 2016, the film was released on DVD in the US as a double Feature with The Magic Snowflake.

== Reception ==
On the review aggregator website Rotten Tomatoes, Santa's Apprentice has a 78% approval rating with an average of 5.50/10 based on 9 reviews.

=== Awards ===
Santa's Apprentice won the UNICEF award at the Annecy International Animation Film Festival in 2011.

== Sequel ==
The sequel The Magic Snowflake (original French title L'apprenti Père Noël et le flocon magique) was released on November 20, 2013 in France and had a limited release in Canada on November 30, 2013.

== See also ==
- List of Christmas films
- Santa Claus in film
