= Snipple Animation =

Philippine animation studio

- Type: Private
- Founded: 2011; 15 years ago
- Founder: Kaine Patel; Jonathan Tinsay; Romy Garcia
- Headquarters: Quezon City, Metro Manila, Philippines
- Website: snippleanimation.com

Snipple Animation is a Philippine animation studio based in Metro Manila, with a corporate office in London, founded in 2011 by Kaine Patel, Jonathan Tinsay, and Romy Garcia. The studio develops animated television series, feature films, original contents, as well as sports team mascots. It is a production partner for companies like Disney Television Animation, Warner Bros. Animation, DreamWorks Animation, Netflix, and Nickelodeon.

Specializing in 2D traditional hand-drawn, paperless, and cutout animation, along with its 3D capabilities, the studio notably worked on the 2D aspect of DreamWorks Animation's Forgotten Island in 2026.

== Filmography ==
=== Films ===
Film	Year(s)	Co-production(s)	Notes
Pinocchio	2012	2d3D Animations; Cometa Film; Iris Productions; Walking the Dog	
The Congress	2013	Pandora Filmproduktion	
Teen Titans Go! To the Movies	2018	Warner Bros. Animation; DC Entertainment	
Teen Titans Go! vs. Teen Titans	2019	Warner Bros. Animation; DC Entertainment	Direct-to-video film
Klaus	2019	Netflix Animation Studios; The SPA Studios	
Phineas and Ferb the Movie: Candace Against the Universe	2020	Disney Television Animation	
Anne Frank's Diary	2020	BFFG Bridgit Folman Film Gang	Clean-up and inbetweening
Happy Halloween, Scooby-Doo!	2020	Warner Bros. Animation	
King Tweety	2022	Warner Bros. Animation	Direct-to-video film
Beavis and Butt-Head Do the Universe	2022	MTV Entertainment Studios; MTV Animation; Judgmental Films; Titmouse, Inc. 3 Arts Entertainment	
Urkel Saves Santa: The Movie!	2023	Warner Bros. Animation	
The Day the Earth Blew Up	2024	Warner Bros. Animation	
Forgotten Island	2026	DreamWorks Animation	2D animated sequences

=== TV series ===
Show	Year(s)	Co-production(s)	Notes
Dude, That's My Ghost!	2013	Alphanim; Cofanim; Backup Films	
Chozen	2014	Rough House Pictures; Floyd County Productions; FX Productions	
Right Now Kapow	2016–2017	Warner Bros. Animation	
ToonMarty	2017	Sardine Productions	
Big Hero 6: The Series	2017–2021	Disney Television Animation	
Unikitty!	2018–2020	The Lego Group; Warner Bros. Animation	
Green Eggs and Ham	2019–2022	Dr. Seuss Enterprises; Gulfstream Pictures; A Stern Talking To; A Very Good Production; Warner Bros. Animation	
Where's Waldo	2019–2021	DreamWorks Animation Television	
Looney Tunes Cartoons	2020–2024	Warner Bros. Animation	
The Mighty Ones	2020–2022	DreamWorks Animation Television	
Animaniacs	2020–2022	Amblin Television; Warner Bros. Animation	
Jellystone!	2021–2025	Warner Bros. Animation	
The Proud Family: Louder and Prouder	2022–2026	Disney Television Animation; BaR Productions	
Beavis and Butt-Head	2022–present	Paramount Television Studios; Judgmental Films; 3 Arts Entertainment; Titmouse, Inc.	Season 9 onward
Hamster & Gretel	2022–2025	Disney Television Animation	
Tiny Toons Looniversity	2023–2025	Amblin Television; Warner Bros. Animation	
Angry Birds Mystery Island	2024	Titmouse, Inc. Rovio Animation; Amazon MGM Studios	
Hit-Monkey	2024	Speck Gordon Inc. Floyd County Productions; 20th Television Animation	additional animation for Season 2
Primos	2024–2025	Disney Television Animation	
Ren and Stimpy	2024	MTV Entertainment Studios; Awesome Inc	
StuGo	2025	Titmouse, Inc. Disney Television Animation	
Phineas and Ferb	2025–present	Disney Television Animation	Season 5 onward
Adventure Time: Side Quests	2026–present	Cartoon Network Studios; FredFilms	
Garfield	2026	Nickelodeon Animation Studio; Paws, Inc.	
