= Gawayn =

Animated television series

- Italian: Il cristallo di Gawayn
- Genre: Comedy; Fairy tale; Fantasy
- Created by: Jan Van Rijsselberge
- Developed by: Peter Saisselin
- Directed by: Luc Vinciguerra (season 1); Christophe Pittet (season 2)
- Voices of: French; Christopher Hespel; Dominique Wagner; Laetitia Liénart; David Scarpuzza; Cathy Boquet; Mathieu Moreau; Emmanuel Liénart; Gauthier de Fauconval; English; Barbara Weber-Scaff; David Gasman; Sharon Mann; Hester Wilcox; Lucinda Davis; Christian Erickson; Sonja Ball; Bruce Dinsmore; Claudia Besso; Emma Taylor-Isherwood; Rick Jones; Richard Dumont
- Theme music composer: Hans Helewaut
- Opening theme: "Gawayn (Original Theme Song)"
- Composer: Hans Helewaut
- Countries of origin: France; Italy (season 1); Canada (season 2)
- Original languages: Italian; French; English
- No. of seasons: 2
- No. of episodes: 104

Production
- Executive producers: Eve Baron (season 1); Christian Davin (season 1); Clément Calvet (season 1); Voyelle Acker (season 1); Lucia Bolzoni (season 1); Pierre Belaïsch (season 2); Michael Prupas (season 2)
- Running time: 13 minutes (including commercials)
- Production companies: Alphanim; Jiang Toon Animation; Mondo TV (season 1); Muse Entertainment (season 2); Eurovision Animation (season 2); Ben & Saatchi (season 2)

Original release
- Network: France 3 (season 1); Rai 3 (season 1); Canal+ Family (season 2); Gulli (season 2)
- Release: June 29, 2009 – March 30, 2013

Gawayn is an animated television series created and designed by Jan Van Rijsselberge. It is produced by Alphanim (previously known as Gaumont-Alphanim for the first season). The title of the show refers to King Arthur's nephew Gawain.

== Synopsis ==
William is an optimistic knight-in-training who lives in the mystical city of Camelot and is devoted to his mentor, knight in gleaming armour, Sir Roderick. The complication starts when the evil Duke of Amaraxos shrinks Princess Gwendolyn and takes over the kingdom, so the friends accompanied by Elspeth, William's sister and an apprentice sorceress, and Xiao Long, a young sage-in-training from distant Asia, set off on an adventure to undo the terrible curse by finding The Crystal of Gawayn.

In season 2, the Questers finally attain the Crystal of Gawayn which they were originally going to use to undo Princess Gwendolyn's curse. But thanks to Sir Roderick's impatience and clumsiness, he interrupts the process causing Gwen's size to be unstable. And to make matters worse, his clumsiness shatters the Crystal and they lose the Great Book of Magic which flies off after the failed spell. Now they return to life on the road with the goal of reclaiming the book and using it to find a way to repair the Crystal and finally put an end to the princess' curse for good.

== Characters ==
- William (voiced by Barbara Weber-Scaff in Season 1 and Sonja Ball in Season 2) – A knight-in-training of the Questers. He wants to be a knight and has made many current inventions. He's Elspeth's younger brother. He is 11 years old, and, despite his young age, is very intelligent, the brain of the group, and a master inventor. He is Sir Roderick's squire and apprentice.
- Sir Roderick (voiced by David Gasman in Season 1 and Bruce Dinsmore in Season 2) – A knight and boyfriend of Princess Gwen. He is very clumsy and often creates problems that put the team in unnecessary trouble and danger.
- Princess Gwendolyn (voiced by Sharon Mann in Season 1 and Claudia Besso in Season 2) – A deposed princess who has been reduced to the size of a doll by the Duke and Rex. Despite her size, she is capable of taking down opponents bigger than herself. In season 2, she was finally to be restored to her original size when they used the crystal, but Sir Roderick interrupted the process that caused it to be shattered, rendering her transformation unstable. Now depending on what emotions she feels, her size changes from small to big.
- Elspeth (voiced by Hester Wilcox in Season 1 and Emma Taylor-Isherwood in Season 2) – A redheaded apprentice magician. She wields the Great Book of Magic that the Duke used to shrink Gwendolyn which she now uses to help the team in their search for the Crystal. She is William's older sister, and they both speak with English accents. In season 2, due to Sir Roderick's idiocy, she botched the restoration process, not only making Gwen's size in constant flux but lost the Great Book of Magic which flew away. She is 10 years old, until "Ferocious Fairies", and is then 11 years old for the rest of the show.
- Xiao Long (voiced by Lucinda Davis) – A 10-year-old Chinese boy and the most gifted of the pack, is a martial arts expert and a sage-in-training. He can cook well. In the second season, it is revealed that the ghost of his grandfather was the one who gives clues to the team on where the Crystal of Gawayn is.
- The Duke (voiced by David Gasman in Season 1 and Rick Jones in Season 2) – The enemy of the team. It was he who shrunk Gwendolyn to usurp the throne from her. He is a failure. Even though he is angry, he can show his heart to his pet and cockroach friend Rex. Together with him, he watches the team on his personal viewing stone, which he uses to thwart the Questers' efforts at every turn.
- Rex (voiced by Christian Erickson in Season 1 and Richard Dumont in Season 2) – The Duke's friend and pet; cockroach. He seems cruel, but he is kind at times and tries to console the Duke. He has known him since childhood. Even though Duke is a loser, he likes him because he looks after him and they spend time together.

== Episodes ==
=== Season 1 ===
No.	Title	Original release date
1	"Never Cross Bridge"	June 29, 2009
When the Questers come to a deep ravine, the girls want to take the scenic route to cross, whereas the boys would rather take the more direct route: across the scary-looking bridge. It's girls vs. boys and it doesn't take long for problems to pop up. Gwen gets swallowed by a fish and the boys have to play a TV-style game with irate beavers.
2	"Try, Try Again"	July 6, 2009
Elspeth is very frustrated. Her magic still isn't working correctly no matter how hard she tries. This problem couldn't come at a worse time, since the Questers find themselves marooned on a tropical island where Roderick is mistaken as the Fish King by the locals. The trouble is, the Fish King gets thrown into the volcano once he's eaten 26 pizzas - and Roderick is finishing up pizza 25! It's William and Elspeth to the rescue!
3	"Play Date"	July 13, 2009
The Questers are worried about Gwen. She seems a little testy and they're convinced they know why: She misses someone her own size! So, they set out to find her a playmate and Elspeth ends up creating a doll that comes to life. Gwen and her date have a whirlwind romance - laughing on the beach, riding a toy horse, etc. - that makes Roderick terribly jealous so he fights the doll in a duel and loses. Now, he's the one in a testy mood!
4	"The Cuckoo Cook"	July 20, 2009
The Evil Duke changes the road signs so the Questers find themselves in the land of the Cuckoo Cook. He kidnaps the Questers because he smells Xiao Long's famous dumplings and demands Xiao Long give him the recipe. But Xiao Long promised his grandfather he would never reveal the recipe and so Xiao Long must honor his ancestor and save the Questers somehow.
5	"License to Knight"	July 27, 2009
Roderick gets pulled over by a policeman for speeding. But when the officer looks at Roderick's "Knight License", he discovers it has expired. Roddy must now go back to the Knight Academy and repass his Knight Exam or he won't be finishing the Quest. Gwendolyn helps him prepare, while the other Questers try to escape from jail.
6	"As Hard as Snails"	TBA
While being chased by the Duke's henchmen, Elspeth frantically tries a new magic spell to make the henchmen slow down. Instead, she changes the Questers into snails and loses her wand in the process. Matters don't get any better because Xiao Long (who isn't a snail) is preparing dinner and thinks snails cooked in butter and garlic might be a tasty treat!
7	"A Pain in the Dragon"	TBA
Cornered by an irate, vicious dragon, the Questers are about to be cooked. But Xiao Long, being very astute and observant, diagnoses the Dragon as suffering from indigestion. Roderick is shrunken down and he and Gwen must « Enter the Dragon » and battle the vicious germ inside.
8	"New Team"	TBA
After being sat on and knocked over by the Questers, Gwen has had enough and decides it's time for a new team. She soon meets a little private detective elf, Mister Daisy, who promises Gwen he'll take her to the Crystal of Gawayn. The trouble is, he's been sent by the Duke and Gwen must rely on herself to escape. While they embark on their adventure, the Questers admit to each other they haven't been careful enough around Gwendolyn. They go to apologize and discover that Mister Daisy has been sent by the evil Duke. But, no problem. Gwen took care of him by herself and she happily rejoins her friends in the Quest!
9	"Princess Rodericka"	TBA
When Roderick accidentally dismisses the role of a princess and sorceress, Elspeth says a spell that puts him in woman's clothing to teach him a lesson. At that very moment, they're captured by Prince Haaak who was hired by Rex. But surprise! Prince Haak immediately falls in love with Roderick. They're to be married shortly unless William can come up with a plan for escape.
10	"Adventures in Dreamland"	TBA
Xiao Long is having night terrors and keeping the Questers up all night. Something must be done. Using Elspeth's magic, they go into his dreams and his subconscious and discover the cause of his nightmares is something he's eating. Something the Duke sent over!
11	"Joust King"	TBA
The Great Book of Magic has told the Questers that they must partake in a jousting tournament. Roddy is so excited because he finally has a real joust that will show off his knightly talents! The only problem is, instead of a horse, Roddy must ride a pig and instead of a lance, he has to use fish! The problems don't stop there. He must also fight the Knight of the Black Plague, a robo-knight that the evil Duke dispatched to stop him.
12	"Wedding Blues"	TBA
The Duke has finally caught the Questers and is holding them in his dungeon. He's elated because not only has he caught them but he's also getting married that day to a very rich lady. But when his bride sees Rex, the cockroach, she demands that the Duke get rid of him. The Duke is torn: Rex or Riches? Well, the Duke chooses riches and Rex is kicked out. Not to be outdone, Rex helps the Questers escape to get revenge on the Duke!
13	"Fasten Your Seatbelts"	TBA
Because of a huge traffic jam, the Questers are forced to book a flight on a dragon airline. But right after take-off, the hostess and pilot parachute away leaving the Questers on the dragon that is flying them straight to the Duke! Can they land this dragon in time!?
14	"Acme Da Vinci"	TBA
In trying to escape an enormous troll, Elspeth magically transports the Gwenmobile across a huge canyon. But she forgot to transport William and herself! To get across, they enlist the help of a crazy inventor, Acme da Vinci, whose inventions fall far short of their purpose. Can William make one of them work before the Troll eats them!?
15	"Casino Quest"	TBA
When Roderick gets the gaming bug in a medieval Las Vegas, he bets the Gwenmobile and everything in it. He loses and low and beholds, accidentally loses William since he was napping in the Gwenmobile! Roderick must somehow win back the Gwenmobile and William before they're delivered to the Duke!
16	"A Quest for a Quest"	TBA
William makes the Questers take a detour to get an autograph from his favorite Knight, Sir Six Pack. None too happy about the detour, the Questers let William get his autograph only to discover the Knight has been hired by the Duke to steal the Great Book of Magic!
17	"Happy Sword"	TBA
The Questers are told by the Great Book of Magic to find the Happy Sword. Thinking it's a sword of power that will help them in their quest, they are soon shocked to discover that the sword is a magical artifact that never stops talking! Before they go crazy, the Questers find a way to get rid of the sword by sending it to the Duke.
18	"Armour Geddon"	TBA
Roderick buys a new suit of armor that is possessed. Programmed by the Duke, the armor is marching Roddy straight back to the Duke unless William and the others can stop the armor!
19	"The Curse"	TBA
Lost in the Scary Forest, Roderick refuses to buy a map from the local gypsy. She puts a curse on the Questers that changes Roderick into a sweet little piglet and the other Questers into hungry wolves. The Questers have to break the spell before nightfall, or else Roddy could be everyone's dinner!
20	"Do the Knight Thing"	TBA
Roderick is feeling a little bored. He's had no Knightly missions lately so Gwen tells Elspeth to conjure up a "game" for Roderick to rescue damsels in distress. The trouble is, while Roderick is playing his game, the VBK, (Very Bad Knight) is sent by the Duke to destroy them before they pass through a toll booth.
21	"Monkey Business"	TBA
While in a monastery, Gwen is asked to pose by a Monk so he can draw her in his illuminated manuscript. But using Magic, he makes Gwen disappear into his book which the Duke then runs off with. William and Roderick take chase and recapture the book (and Gwen) and lose the Duke in the monastery's maze.
22	"Ferocious Fairies"	TBA
When Gwendolyn takes Elspeth shopping for her birthday at the local Castle-Mart (medieval superstore), the Duke sends three ferocious fairies to kidnap Gwendolyn. But true to his word, William won't let anyone ruin Elspeth's birthday.
23	"Again, Again, And Again..."	TBA
The Questers finally reach the end of their quest and are about to take the crystal of Gawain, only to find themselves starting over again and again. William is the only one who understands they're repeating everything and realizes an evil Wizard, Bob Bob, (who repeats everything twice) hexed them. William must find Bob Bob and make time to return to normal!
24	"All Aboard"	TBA
When the Questers are caught stowing away on a pirate cruise ship, they must work off their journey by taking care of some very important and annoying guests: The Duke and Rex!
25	"Vroom"	TBA
The Great Book of Magic instructs the Questers to enter a car race and win first prize: A kiss from the gorgeous Miss Vroom! Jealous that they might get to kiss her, the Duke enters the race himself with his fancy cart and races the Questers. And of course, he doesn't plan to follow the rules!
26	"Hey, Where's My Gwenmobile"	TBA
After eating in a tavern, the Questers discover that the Gwenmobile has been stolen by the Heaven's Devils, a ferocious gang who ride cycles. Borrowing some tricycles, our Questers take pursuit and catch them and discover Heaven's Devils are skeletons in long trench coats! A Jason-Argonauts-style fight ensues and the Questers retrieve the cart.
27	"Mr. Pants"	TBA
The Great Book of Magic instructs the Questers to get a one-eyed teddy bear that will open a portal to another land. Easy, thinks Roderick. But the one-eyed teddy bear belongs to the Duke who is staying with his mummy nearby.
28	"Duped by the Duke"	TBA
While frantically searching for his whistle, Roderick meets a young, polite lad who helps him. Before you know it, Roderick has hired him to be his assistant. William is put out but soon afterward discovers that the lad is none other than the Duke in disguise! Now, it's up to William to rescue the Questers by himself.
29	"Good Luck in Bad Luck Forest"	TBA
The GBM tells the Questers to get a Good Luck Charm. The trouble is they have to enter the Bad Luck Forest and it doesn't take long for their luck to turn really, really bad. In no time at all, the Questers fight and split up! But as each Quester tries to exit Bad Luck Forest, bad luck keeps them running into each other and they realize to get out of the forest they have to work together. They're the Good Luck Charm! The Duke is incensed and tries to stop them from using everything he has in his arsenal. But because he's in Bad Luck Forest, nothing works and the Questers go free!
30	"Secret of Roddy's Success"	TBA
When the Duke looks through Roddy's school yearbook, he contacts Roddy's nemesis to thwart the Questers. But at William's urging, Roddy faces his fear and confronts the bully, who, amazingly has changed his ways because of Gwen's entreaties. The Duke's plan is foiled.
31	"Rexster-Quester"	TBA
When Rex suspects the Duke might lose to the Questers, he decides to switch sides and joins the Questers- only to become the most annoying houseguest they've ever known.
32	"The Witches of Weirdsville"	TBA
When Elspeth receives an invitation to participate in a sorceress competition in the Weirdsville festival, she insists they go. But the Duke, who sent the invitation, has sent the Questers to a town that burns witches - with a smile!
33	"Bad News Travels Fast"	TBA
The Duke sends out carrier pigeons with messages that are distributed to the town inhabitants of Rajepoute. These messages are full of lies and the Questers find themselves in big trouble. Luckily, Elspeth turns herself into a pigeon and sets things straight, freeing the Questers and saving their reputation!
34	"Evil R We"	TBA
Realizing the Questers are always well-liked because they're so nice, the Duke arranges to turn the Questers into evil versions of themselves. This way no one will help them. But the Evil Questers now turn on the Duke and chase him for a change!
35	"Roddy's Big Idea"	TBA
Wanting to prove to the others he has really good ideas, Roddy raises some much-needed cash by turning in the Questers to the authorities and claiming the ransom. When he realizes what he's done, Roddy needs to find a really, really good idea to free them.
36	"Castle Spa"	TBA
The Questers desperately need a bath and are relieved to find a spa. Unfortunately, Dame Scrubitt, the owner, works for the Duke and soon imprisons them in their baths. Gwen is the only one able to save them and must go down the drain and battle rats to save her friends.
37	"Knight for Hire"	TBA
Needing money, Roddy signs up at an employment agency only to find himself working for the Duke. He's been hired to catch the Questers. Because of the code of knights, he has to complete his job unless William and the others find a way to relieve him of his duty!
38	"Cry Me a River"	TBA
When Roderick accidentally breaks Elspeth's magic wand, they must repair it to continue the quest. The only thing that will fix the wand is the tear of an evil being. The Duke is the only evil person they know of and so they go back to his castle and pretend to be a traveling theater group and try to make him cry with a sad, sad play.
39	"Force of the Onion"	TBA
Xiao Long goes on strike because he feels he's always being asked to do Kung Fu. He's tired of always being the one to do the big fighting. Gwendolyn suggests he gives the Questers kung fu lessons so they can help. He agrees and so they go to a temple where Xiao Long is their master teacher- much to their annoyance. The Duke arrives ready to do some kung fu fighting himself.
40	"Home Sweet Home"	TBA
In trying to treat some homesickness for the Questers, Elspeth accidentally sends them all back to the beginning of time and in the process changes to time itself. Now the Duke has to rescue them because if he doesn't, he will lead a life of a lowly servant!
41	"Doll Be Mine"	TBA
When the Duke succeeds in kidnapping Gwen, he decides to hand her over to a spoiled little girl who wants her as a birthday present. The Questers must infiltrate the girl's house and rescue Gwendolyn from the bratty child.
42	"Bigger Brother"	TBA
Knowing their quest will always be foiled by the Duke as long as he has the viewing stone, William makes his own viewing stone to spy on the Duke. Soon, no one is doing anything except looking at each other and the Quest is forgotten - that is until Xiao Long takes matters in hand!
43	"Smashing Times"	TBA
The Questers enter a very strange land and find themselves before a crystal sculpture that Roddy accidentally breaks. The owners, a group of paranoid Dodo birds, insist the Questers rebuild it, and if they succeed they can have the Crystal of Gawayn. Excited, the Questers work hard and fast, only to discover it's the crystal of Goran, not Gawayn that is their prize.
44	"My Name Is Pond... Percy Pond"	TBA
When the Questers accidentally run into Percy Pond, a medieval spy, Gwen insists they hire him to help in the quest. The only trouble is, Percy has a lot of bad guys chasing him, making matters much worse for the Questers.
45	"Trouble Ahead"	TBA
When William looks into a crystal ball, he sees a horrible future that reveals the Princess is a double agent working with the Duke. He convinces the others to believe him only to later discover the Duke had altered the crystal ball to project falsehoods and lies. Now, William and the others have to apologize to Gwen! (Gulp.)
46	"Over Due"	TBA
The Great Book of Magic must be renewed at the witches' library, but when Elspeth goes to the front desk, she discovers the Duke has checked it out! Now, William and Elspeth must get it back.
47	"Quiz Show"	TBA
The Questers come across a Quiz Show where the prize is the Crystal of Gawayn. They enter the competition and amazingly, they win the game only to discover that the crystal is a fake.
48	"Love Trouble"	TBA
An ogre, sent by the Duke to destroy the Questers once and for all, falls in love with Gwendolyn the moment he sees her. William takes the moment to switch places with the Ogre and gives the Duke a taste of his own medicine.
49	"Maze Mates"	TBA
The Duke builds a huge maze in which to trap the Questers. And trap them he does- until he realizes he's trapped himself and Rex too. They all must work together to find a way out and avoid the minotaur that's chasing them.
50	"Along Came Spyder"	TBA
The Duke decides to hire a professional- The Spyder- to take care of the Questers. The Spyder, a master of disguises, infiltrates the Questers as a cute, cuddly white rabbit. For once, Roddy isn't fooled. But convincing the others isn't so easy.
51	"The Way We Used to Be"	2011
52	"The Way We Used to Be"	2011
Part 1: When the Questers are finally within reach of the Crystal of Gawayn, the Duke begs Rex for help. He must stop them! With the help of a Wizard, Rex gives the Questers amnesia. Now, they can't remember who they are or what they're doing. All seems lost for our Questers... (To be continued). Part 2: While celebrating his victory over the Questers, the Duke is paid a visit by the Evil Council. They tell the Duke he can't give the Questers amnesia. It's not Evil if they can't remember! To avoid being banished forever, the Duke and Rex must now give the Questers back their memory in order to destroy them. But, in the end, the Questers trick the Duke, escape again, and resume the quest!

=== Season 2 ===
No.	Title	Original release date
1	"Supersized Rex"	2012
The Duke accidentally turns Rex into a giant who turns on his creator. The Duke must turn to the Questers for help. But can they even save the world from the giant cockroach Rex?
2	"Shopping Frenzy"	TBA
When the Questers stop at the local superstore, they discover Spyder, their old nemesis. Since they ruined his reputation as a villain, he's out for revenge and it's a race down the aisles to escape the wrath of a rabbit scorned.
3	"Mandoline Champion"	TBA
Roddy forgets his friends and the quest when he is turned into a singing rock star by a cursed mandolin. The only way to break the curse is to find someone who wants the mandolin. Luckily, the Duke is on the way!
4	"Duke Yes Duke"	TBA
Upset that he lost the "Villain of the Year" award to Bob Bob the Magician, the Duke works with the Questers to steal the Great Book of Magic from Bob Bob in the hopes of ousting him from the competition.
5	"Xiao in love"	TBA
When Xiao falls head over heels in love with a girl, he decides to leave the quest. However, the girl turns out to be the evil Spyder in disguise. Once again, he wants revenge. Who knew love could hurt so much!
6	"Dr Roddy"	TBA
When the Great Book of Magic is to be burned by villagers blaming it for their ills, Roddy pretends to be a doctor while William and Elspeth try to find the real cause behind the illnesses. But can Roddy's brand of medicine pass the test?
7	"The Great Bake-Off"	TBA
When the Questers discover that the Great Book of Magic has a sweet tooth they set out to lure it with a big cake. But the Duke challenges them to a bake off. Who will be the best chef?
8	"Man Trouble"	TBA
When Gwen receives a wedding invitation from Percy Pond, she insists on going. But Roddy, jealous, refuses to set foot in the church. It's a good thing too, since the whole wedding was a trap set by the Duke.
9	"Animal Convention"	TBA
Questers are elated to discover that the Great Book of Magic is at a Talking Animal Convention. However, it's "no humans allowed" so they rely on a talking Cat who might have a second agenda.
10	"Smooch or Not Too Smooch"	TBA
The Questers find themselves in a murky swamp lured by a singing frog who turns Gwen into a toad. Now the Questers have to find Gwen and have her kiss Roddy to save her. "Ribbit."
11	"Miss Princess"	TBA
Gwen enters a beauty contest when she learns first prize is a magic mirror that will tell them where to find the Great Book of Magic. It's all a trap set up by royal brat Miranda working for the Duke.
12	"Eco questers"	TBA
When Roddy installs solar panels on the Gwenmobile to be more eco-friendly, he accidentally sends a ray beam into outer space and diverts a meteor. Now, it's headed toward earth and everyone has to join forces to stop it.
13	"Gwen Smackdown"	TBA
When the kids discover that the grand prize of a wrestling match is the Great Big of Magic, they beg Gwen to enter since she's been stuck in BIG SIZE for weeks. But once in the ring, Gwen goes to small size and the odds aren't in her favor!
14	"Trading places"	TBA
When Roddy organizes a home exchange, he inadvertently swaps the Gwenmobile for a Witches' Villa. But the townspeople think the Questers are the witches and decide to burn them at the stake!
15	"Second chance"	TBA
The Questers believe their troubles are over when they learn the Duke has become a hairdresser. But it seems the man who took over from the Duke has plans of his own for the Great Book of Magic.
16	"The Great Splotchball Game"	TBA
The Questers find themselves summoned by a Grand Wizard to play a soccer-type game for the Great Book of Magic. But the real game is off the field!
17	"Night at the Castle"	
When a crazed Collector captures the Questers for his collection, William is their only hope. When he sees that Rex has been collected too, they work together to free the Questers.
18	"Alien contact"	TBA
The Questers are caught by extra-terrestrials who were sent by the Duke. Only Xiao Long is free and it's up to him to save his friends before the alien experiments begin!
19	"At Any Price"	TBA
When the Questers discover the Great Book of Magic is in the hands of a Telemarketing Genius, they challenge him to a sell-off. The stakes are high because if Elspeth and Roddy don't win the sales competition, the Questers will be turned into toy figurines!
20	"Star system"	TBA
The Questers get cast in a movie only to discover it was a trap set by the Duke. Since Roddy wasn't hired because he was a bad actor, he's their only hope – if he can get over the rejection!
21	"Questers new & improved"	TBA
The Duke hatches his most insane plan yet: He creates perfect clones of the Questers to find the Great Book of Magic. When the real Questers come face-to-face with their better halves, it's a toss up on who will win.
22	"Super questers"	TBA
The Questers learn they can only retrieve the Great Book of Magic if they obtain super powers from a retired superhero who has his own agenda.
23	"Monster's Ball"	TBA
In seeking the Great Book of Magic, the Questers go to a fancy ball. However, when they arrive, they soon discover the hosts are vampires and they're dinner!
24	"Quack Quack"	TBA
Just as the Questers find the Great Book of Magic they fall under the spell of a rubber duck who leads them toward a cliff. Xiao Long tries his best to break the spell of the Quack Quack!
25	"Roddy the Nasty"	TBA
Roddy accidentally absorbs all the magic spells from the Great Book of Magic into his brain! Unless Elspeth reverses the process, all that magic will make Roddy go to the dark side!
26	"Do the Mashed Potato"	TBA
The Questers discover the Great Book of Magic is in a vat of mashed potatoes that never empties. But Elspeth's magic spell misfires and turns the mashed potatoes into a huge blob that eats everything in its path.
27	"The Arm of Steel"	TBA
In trying to win the Great Book of Magic, Roddy, William and Xiao Long are trapped in an arm wrestling machine. Their only hope for freedom is Gwen's old gym teacher - who isn't the same man Gwen thinks he is.
28	"Time Shifters"	TBA
The Duke travels back in time and stops Gwen from ever meeting Roddy. Now's it's up to the other Questers to have them meet again so the quest can resume.
29	"Back to school"	TBA
Elspeth must go back to magic school to complete her degree while her friends are locked in a Snow Globe in the Duke's possession! She better get a passing grade, or else….
30	"The Purse"	TBA
When a magic purse offered as a present by the Duke swallows Gwen, Roddy and all the grown ups in a village, William, Elspeth and Xiao force him to take it back by dropping off every baby and child in his castle. Daycare has never been so hard!
31	"Slipped My Mind"	TBA
When Elspeth loses her memory, the Duke sets her against her friends. Will friendship win over memory loss?
32	"The Copycat Monk"	TBA
The Questers trace a fake Great Book of Magic to a monastery where the real one is held. The only trouble is, the villagers are storming the monastery because they've been sold bad copies too.
33	"The Fan"	TBA
When a Big Fan of the Questers saves them from the Duke, their troubles are far from over. The Fan never wants the quest to end and stops them from ever finding the Great Book of Magic.
34	"Herbal Cure"	TBA
When the Great Book of Magic becomes sick, the Questers find a magic doctor who is non other than the Duke in disguise. But now, the Duke is sick and needs their help!
35	"Sandwich and Salad"	TBA
The Duke goes "high-tech" and sends a robot to stop the Questers once and for all. But because of a mishap the robot becomes the perfect household-helper instead.
36	"The Happiest Day of Her Life"	TBA
William, Elspeth and Xiao pose as wedding planners to stop the forced marriage of Roddy and Lukerina (the Duke's old fiancé). She plans on giving the Great Book of Magic to the Duke once the "I DO'S" are said.
37	"The Efficiency Expert"	TBA
Gwen hires an efficiency expert to help the team be more efficient in their quest. After his analysis, William and Roddy are fired – only to later discover the expert was sent by the Duke.
38	"Rabbitville"	TBA
Spyder steals the Great Book of Magic and hides out in a town where Rabbits are sacred. Do the Questers stand a chance against bunnies?
39	"The 6th Quester"	TBA
A knight Roddy replaced in the very beginning of the quest returns to Gwen and challenges Roddy to once and for all decide who is the true knight for the Questers.
40	"Sweet Dreams"	TBA
The Duke infiltrates Gwen's dream and convinces her to abandon the quest, while he traps the other Questers and sets them adrift on a raft.
41	"Fairytale Mania"	TBA
Gwen, William and Xiao find themselves caught in a fairy tale where Gwen's the wicked witch ready to make William and Xiao into a tasty treat. It's up to Elspeth and Roddy to save them.
42	"Fantastic Island"	TBA
Landing on a remote island, the Questers are turned into sheep to help keep the golf course nice and neat! It's up to William and Elspeth to save the sheep – eh, their friends! But with the Duke on the island, that won't be easy.
43	"The Duke's Mother"	TBA
The Questers discover they have a more formidable enemy on their hands: The Duke's mother! After she catches Gwen, Roddy and William, it's up to Xiao Long and Elspeth to convince the Duke to stand up to his mother once and for all.
44	"The Curse of Old Age"	TBA
When Elspeth argues with a witch, she's turned into an older version of herself at the same time Xiao Ling is turned into a statue.. Can she save her friend even when she's 103 years old?
45	"Fun House"	TBA
The Questers are trapped in a FUN HOUSE and Roddy is the only one able to save them. If only he'd get over his fear of clowns!

== Production ==
The series was originally announced under the title "The Questers" in 2007. The first season of 52 13-minute episodes was produced by Alphanim, Jiang Toon Animation and Mondo TV France. The second season of 52 13-minute episodes was produced by Alphanim, Jang Toon Animation, Muse Entertainment, Eurovision Animation and Ben & Saatchi.

== International broadcasts ==
Country	Channel	Year
Italy	Rai 3	1 March 2010 –
France	France 3, France 4, Gulli, TV5Monde, Boomerang	19 August 2009 –
Australia	ABC1, ABC3	14 January 2010 –
Canada	CBC	2010 –
Spain	La 2, Clan	2009 –
Portugal	RTP 1, RTP 2, Canal Panda, Biggs	2009 –
Brazil	Disney XD, Gloob	2010 –
United States	Starz Kids & Family	2011–2014
Israel	Arutz HaYeladim	18 August 2009 –
Poland	Teletoon+	11 November 2011 –
Hungary	M2	2012 –
Switzerland	TSR	2010 –
Belgium	RTBF	2009 –
Philippines	Nickelodeon Philippines	3 August 2009 –
India	Disney Channel India	10 September 2009 –
Serbia	RTV1	30 September 2019 –
Germany	KiKa, Das Erste	17 August 2009 –
Malaysia	NTV7	August 2013 -
Netherlands	NPO Zapp	2010 -
Qatar	JeemTV	2014 -
Japan	Disney Channel	21 July 2014 -
Timor-Leste	Cartoon Network	2014 -
Hong Kong	TVB Jade	2018 -
