= Cole Sand =

American actor (born 2003)

- Born: May 24, 2003 (age 22)
- Occupation: Actor
- Years active: 2008–present

Cole Sand (born May 24, 2003) is an American actor. He played Nelson in the Disney Channel show Austin & Ally and Jensen in the NBC comedy-drama Parenthood and is the voice of Eli Pepperjack in DreamWorks' Tales of Arcadia.

== Filmography ==
=== Films ===
| Year | Film | Role | Notes |
|---|---|---|---|
| 2010 | Santa's Apprentice | Nicholas Barnsworth (voice) | US English dub |
| 2011 | The Measure of a Man | Danny | |
| 2013 | The Magic Snowflake | Nicholas Barnsworth (voice) | US English dub |
| 2013 | Bukowski | David | |
| 2015 | Minions | Additional Voices | |
| 2015 | Hotel Transylvania 2 | Additional Voices | |
| 2016 | Good Kids | Young Andy | |
| 2020 | Magic Camp | Nathan Jenkins | |
| 2021 | Trollhunters: Rise of the Titans | Eli Pepperjack (voice) | |

=== Television ===
| Year | Title | Role | Notes |
|---|---|---|---|
| 2008 | Decent People | | Short |
| 2009 | Able | Alex | Short |
| 2009 | Parks and Recreation | Boy at Zoo | Episode: "Pawnee Zoo" |
| 2009 | General Hospital | Six-year-old child | Episode #1.11899 |
| 2010 | The Event | Vicky's Son Adam | Episode: "A Matter of Life and Death" |
| 2010 | The Whole Truth | Alex Herrera | Episode: "Uncanny" |
| 2010–11 | Parenthood | Jensen | 7 episodes |
| 2011–13 | Austin & Ally | Nelson | 12 episodes |
| 2011 | Mike & Molly | Satchel | Episode: "Christmas Break" |
| 2012 | Modern Family | Trick or Treater #3 | Episode: "Open House of Horrors" |
| 2012 | American Horror Story: Asylum | Son | Episode: "Unholy Night" |
| 2012 | NCIS | Young Luca Sciuto | Episode: "Hit and Run" |
| 2013 | Childrens Hospital | Dylan | Episode: "Imaginary Friends" |
| 2013 | Defending Santa | Alex | TV movie |
| 2013 | New Girl | Little Kid | Episode: "All In" |
| 2013 | The Millers | Artie | Episode: "Giving the Bird" |
| 2014 | Sam & Cat | Lucas | Episode: "#Lumpatious" |
| 2013–14 | Hart of Dixie | Little Harley / Harley Wilkes II | 6 episodes |
| 2014 | Perception | Dillon Wilcox | Episode: "Shiver" |
| 2013–14 | Masters of Sex | Henry Johnson | 9 episodes |
| 2015 | Fresh Off the Boat | Gumdrop | Episode: "Dribbling Tiger, Bounce Pass Dragon" |
| 2015 | Bella and the Bulldogs | Lorin | Episode: "Bulldog Buddies" |
| 2015 | The Night Shift | Ethan Edwards | Episode: "Moving On" |
| 2015 | Henry Danger | Elroy | Episode: "The Beat Goes On" |
| 2016 | Star vs. the Forces of Evil | Additional voices | Episode: "Hungry Larry/Spider with a Top Hat" |
| 2016–18 | Trollhunters: Tales of Arcadia | Eli Pepperjack (voice) | 15 episodes |
| 2017 | Drunk History | Archie Roosevelt | Episode: "Drunk History Christmas Special" |
| 2018 | Best.Worst.Weekend.Ever. | Argo Andropolis | Main role, 8 episodes |
| 2018–19 | 3Below: Tales of Arcadia | Eli Pepperjack (voice) | 22 episodes |
