= Richard Tatum =

American actor

Richard Tatum is an American voice and stage actor. He is known for his voice-over work in video games, movies and TV shows.

== Biography ==
Richard Tatum is associate artistic director at the ARK Theatre Company in Los Angeles, where his productions of The Country Wife by William Wycherley, The London Cuckholds, On the Verge, and Good have received serious critical attention - his script adaptation of The Country Wife was nominated for a 2010 LA Weekly Theatre Award. He appeared in a production of A Doll's House for that company, earning Best Supporting Male nomination from the LA Weekly Theatre Awards. Tatum also appeared in the 2003 independent film production of Shakespeare's Merchant in the comedic role of the Prince of Aragon.

== Filmography ==
=== Video games ===
- Arcanum: Of Steamworks and Magick Obscura – Geoffrey Tarellond-Ashe
- Call of Duty: Black Ops III – Additional voices
- Civilization VI – Theodore "Teddy" Roosevelt
- Dark Reign 2 – Additional voices
- Destroy All Humans! 2 – Additional voices
- Disney Infinity 3.0 – Biggs Darklighter, Additional voices
- Fallout 4 – Rex Goodman, Vault-Tec Scientist, Issac Karlin
- Final Fantasy XIV – Sthalmann, PC Roegadyn
- Final Fantasy XV - Additional voices
- Final Fantasy VII Remake - Additional voices
- Genshin Impact – Pierro
- Grand Theft Auto V – The Local Population
- Kung Fu Panda – Additional voices
- Lego Jurassic World – Additional voices
- Mafia III – Additional voices
- Mercenaries 2: World in Flames – American Soldier
- Octopath Traveler II – Roque
- Red Faction: Guerrilla – Additional voices
- Saints Row 2 – Additional voices
- Skylanders: Imaginators – Countdown (uncredited)
- Skylanders: SuperChargers – Countdown
- Skylanders: Swap Force – Countdown
- Skylanders: Trap Team – Countdown
- Spyro: Year of the Dragon – Agent 9
- Spyro Reignited Trilogy - Agent 9, Bartholomew
- Star Ocean: Integrity and Faithlessness – Doctor Krupp
- Takedown: Red Sabre – Additional voices
- The Sopranos: Road to Respect – Additional voices
- World of Final Fantasy – Segwarides, Rorrik Farna, Knight in the Golden Mask

=== TV series ===
- Awkward Embraces – IT Guy, Richard
- Pet Star – Judge
- Red Handed – The Boss
- Spy TV – Various
- Suspense – Self, Lawrence Tiernan, Porky, Captain Plesser, Reverend Abernathy, Mr. Weisz, Doctor Laskey, Maltzer, Detective Palumbo, William Harker, High Priest, Assistant D.A. Berger
- We're Alive – Pippin

=== Films/TV movies ===
- HBO: The Making of 'The Sopranos: Road to Respect' – Multiple characters
- Shakespeare's Merchant – Prince of Aragon
- Starry Night – X-Ray Technician
- The Trojan Women – Newscaster

=== Shorts ===
- Adventures in Odyssey: The Journal of John Avery Whittaker – Additional voices
- Clever Girl – Rabbi
- Health & Disorder – Additional voices
- Moving Millie – Movie Theater Stranger
- The Break Up – Rachel's Boss

=== Animation voice roles ===
- As Told by Ginger – Javier
- Santa's Apprentice – Waldorf
- Static Shock – Omar Harmozi
- The Magic Snowflake – Waldorf

=== Anime voice roles ===
- Cagaster of an Insect Cage – Jin
- My Oni Girl – Yōichi Tanimoto
