= SantApprentice =

Television series

- Created by: Jan Van Rijsselberge
- Directed by: Luc Vinciguerra
- Voices of: Hélène Bizot; Florence Dumortier; Frédéric Cerdal; Nathalie Bienaimé; Patrick Pellegrin; Jessie Lambotte; Patrick Noérie
- Opening theme: "SantApprentice Theme" performed by Audrey Joelle
- Ending theme: "SantApprentice Theme" (instrumental)
- Composer: Laurent Aknin
- Countries of origin: France; Germany
- Original language: French
- No. of seasons: 1
- No. of episodes: 50

Production
- Executive producers: Christian Davin; Clément Calvet
- Running time: 12 minutes 26 minutes (episodes 49–50)
- Production companies: Alphanim; Europool; Startrack Ltd. Hosem; Village Productions

Original release
- Release: November 2006 – December 2006

SantApprentice is an animated television series in 50 episodes of 12 minutes and two 26 minute episodes created by Belgian animator Jan Van Rijsselberge and produced by Alphanim in 2006. The holiday series follows the adventures of Nicolas, a young orphan boy from Sydney, Australia, who is a pure of heart and believes in Santa Claus as he is Santa's Apprentice. Nicolas's job is to achieve his tasks to become full-fledged Santa.

The series spawned two theatrically-released feature-length films: Santa's Apprentice (2010) and The Magic Snowflake (2013).

== Episodes ==
1. What If It's Not Me?
2. Nicolas' Present
3. A Long Night
4. He Doesn't Exist
5. Nobody's Perfect
6. Plumped Up for Christmas
7. Santa's Whim
8. Nicolas in Charge
9. The Greatest Secret
10. Never Happy
11. First Hat-Bell Exam
12. Garland Spray
13. The Secret Door
14. The Big Exam
15. Stardust
16. Blushing Beatrice
17. And Afterwards?
18. Snowed Under!
19. Memory of Christmas
20. Santa's Fiancée
21. The Infernal Goatskin
22. The Mobile
23. The Old Magician
24. All Those Little Details
25. Father Christmas
26. Santa Playa Club
27. A Real Family
28. The Present Monster
29. Santa's Surprise
30. Ghost of Christmas
31. The Unwanted Present
32. The Lost Bear
33. Grandma Nicole
34. The First Toy
35. A Test! What Test?
36. The Meteorite
37. The Reindeers' Secret
38. So Lucky!
39. Real Toys
40. Metal Granny
41. They've Changed Santa!
42. Elf Certificate
43. The Test of the Mammoth
44. The Melvinelf
45. Practical Joker
46. Santa's Fan
47. O Christmas Tree
48. A Present for Margaret
49. The Day Before Christmas (double-length episode)
50. Christmas Peeve (double-length episode)

== Broadcast ==
The series has been aired on Starz Kids & Family in the United States and on YTV in Canada. France, Germany, Finland, Scandinavia, Poland and some other countries in Europe as well as Latin America to continue to air the animated TV series during the holiday season. In the Philippines it was aired in November 2009 on ABS-CBN and re-aired in 2014–2015 on Yey. From 2018 to 2020, SantApprentice has been available to stream on Amazon Prime Video. The series is available for viewing on YouTube in both French and English.

== See also ==
- List of Christmas films
- Santa Claus in film
