= Zombie Hotel =

Animated television series, 2005–2007

- Genre: Comedy horror
- Created by: Jan Van Rijsselberge
- Directed by: Luc Vinciguerra
- Voices of: Aileen Mythen; Christiana Anbri; Doug Preis; Becca Lish; Thomas Sharkey; Rod Goodall; Philip McGettigan; Paul Tylak
- Theme music composer: Gregory Magee; Anna Rice
- Opening theme: "Zombie Hotel Theme"
- Ending theme: "Zombie Hotel Theme" (instrumental)
- Composer: Gregory Magee
- Countries of origin: France; Ireland; Germany
- Original languages: French; English
- No. of seasons: 1
- No. of episodes: 26

Production
- Executive producers: Christian Davin; Clément Calvet; Paul Cummins; Ralph Christians
- Producers: Siobhán Ní Ghadhra; Moe Honan
- Editor: Cliona Nolan
- Running time: 23 minutes
- Production companies: Alphanim; Telegael; Magma Films; LuxAnimation; Hosem

Original release
- Network: France 3 (France); TG4 (Ireland)
- Release: January 15, 2005 – October 9, 2007

Zombie Hotel is an animated children's television series about a hotel run by zombies, created by Jan Van Rijsselberge and produced by Alphanim, Telegael, Magma, LuxAnimation and Hosem for France 3 and TG4.

== Premise ==
The main characters are Maggot and Fungus, two child zombies who pretend to be human to get into their local school, and their family and boarders at the hotel run by their parents. They make friends with Sam, a human boy whose mother is away most of the time. Sam soon finds out about their zombie powers and all three make a team of friends. Sam uses an old railway carriage as his haunt. The plot often involves a risk of the discovery of Maggot's and Fungus's zombie nature and the three trying to prevent this. The hotel itself is one of several main locations used in the show. Others include the school and Sam's railway carriage.

=== Named ===
- Maggot: The courageous, bossy and hot-headed twin sister of Fungus. (Voiced by Christiana Anbri)
- Fungus: The hardworking, cool brother who loves doing impossible DIY. (Voiced by Aileen Mythen)
- Sam: Maggot's and Fungus's human friend. (Voiced by Thomas Sharkey)
- Rictus: The children's father who runs the Zombie Hotel. He doesn't get along with his father well. (Voiced by Doug Preis)
- Funerella: Rictus's wife and the children's mother. She gets worried a lot, but loves her family. (Voiced by Becca Lish)
- Grandpa: Rictus's father and the children's grandfather.
- Jeebies: The hotel's elderly butler who has a hunched back. He is quite prone to losing his limbs. (Voiced by Rod Goodall)
- Chef: A grouchy vampire who is the head chef in the hotel. He is known for his horrible food creations which even the zombies find hard to eat sometimes. His father is inspired by Count Dracula. (Voiced by Rob Rackstraw)
- Wilson: Chef's assistant. His head is detachable and it is shown he can replace it with a new one. (Voiced by Philip McGettigan)
- The Colonel: A small-headed, but rotund bodied zombie who used to be in the military. He is a resident of the hotel and often rolls using his round shape. In the second episode, it shows that he may have some feelings for Dame Fedora. (Voiced by Paul Tylak)
- Dame Fedora: A ghost resident at the hotel who never stops complaining about things. (Voiced by Fran Brill)
- Uncle Von: Maggot's and Fungus's mad scientist uncle. He has a laboratory in the hotel. In the English dub, he speaks with a German accent.
- Francis: Von's creation and sidekick, a Frankenstein's monster-style character. (Voiced by Thomas McHugh)
- Tut: A mummified DJ who likes telling bad jokes. (Voiced by Gary Hetzler)
- Ms. Harriet Harbottle: Maggot's and Fungus's teacher. (Voiced by Becca Lish)
- Mr. Peabody: The headteacher of Maggot's and Fungus's school. (Voiced by Patrick Fitzsymons)
- Harvey Justine: Harbottle's nephew who Maggot, Fungus and Sam have to often reluctantly babysit. He's similar to Sam in that he loves zombies, though he doesn't yet realize that Maggot and Fungus aren't dressed up and wearing makeup like zombies.
- Araminta: Sam's mother who is away on business a lot. At first, she thought her son shouldn't be friend with Maggot and Fungus.
- Basil: A school bully who is the enemy of Maggot, Fungus and Sam.
- Eli: A student genius at school. When he made a presentation about zombies, he thought that they are dumb creatures, which offended Maggot and Fungus.
- Lucy: A popular girl at school who often makes fun of Maggot and Fungus.
- Dominica: A goth girl who is in love with Fungus.
- Rita Exacto: A woman who stayed at the hotel in Episode 6 who turned out to be a monster hunter. (Voiced by Julia Wetherell)
- Mary-Beth: A woman who is in love with Scott. She stayed at the hotel in Episode 14. She is very cheerful and speaks in a high-pitched voice. She is the only character in the series whose had their lines dubbed. (Voiced by Coreen Corneil (her first few lines; before she and Scott went into the hotel) and Becca Lish (most of the episode))
- Scott: A man who is in love with Mary-Beth. He stayed at the hotel in Episode 14. He speaks with a Southern accent. (Voiced by Fred Newman)
- Nicola: A girl who is usually seen with Lucy. She is just as mean and stuck-up as her. (Voiced by Christiana Anbri)
- Marion: A news reporter who works with Brad. She inspected the hotel in Episode 13. (Voiced by Gracie Sisto)
- Brad: A news reporter who works with Marion. He inspected the hotel in Episode 13. (Voiced by Matt Vogel)

==== Unnamed ====
- Soccer girl with black hair: She wears a red soccer uniform, gray shorts, gray leggings and black shoes. She only has one speaking line: "Maggot, over here!" and appeared in the episode "The Bogeyman Cometh".

== Episodes ==
1. First Day
2. Love is in the Air
3. Plumbing the Depths
4. Zombie Pride
5. Brat Attack
6. There's Something About Zombies
7. Vote for Zombie
8. Happy People
9. Oh My Goth!
10. It's Not Fair
11. Funerella's Deathday
12. The Bogeyman Cometh
13. Dead Trendy
14. Something Old, Something Newt
15. Too Many Cooks
16. Hexed
17. Inspector Fungus
18. School Exchange
19. Movie Madness
20. The Wrong Von
21. Night of the Undead Babysitters!
22. Toying with Magic
23. Carrots, Sticks and Robots
24. A Zombie's Best Friend
25. The Hug Bug
26. A Class Act

== Home media ==
In 2006, BBC DVD released the DVD "It's Alright, We Don't Bite!" containing the episodes "First Day", "Happy People", "Funerella's Deathday", "Inspector Fungus" and "Movie Madness".

== Awards ==
Zombie Hotel has won a number of awards including Best TV series at the Federation of Indian Chambers of Commerce and Industry 2006 awards.
