= Mary Pat Gleason =

American actress (1950–2020)

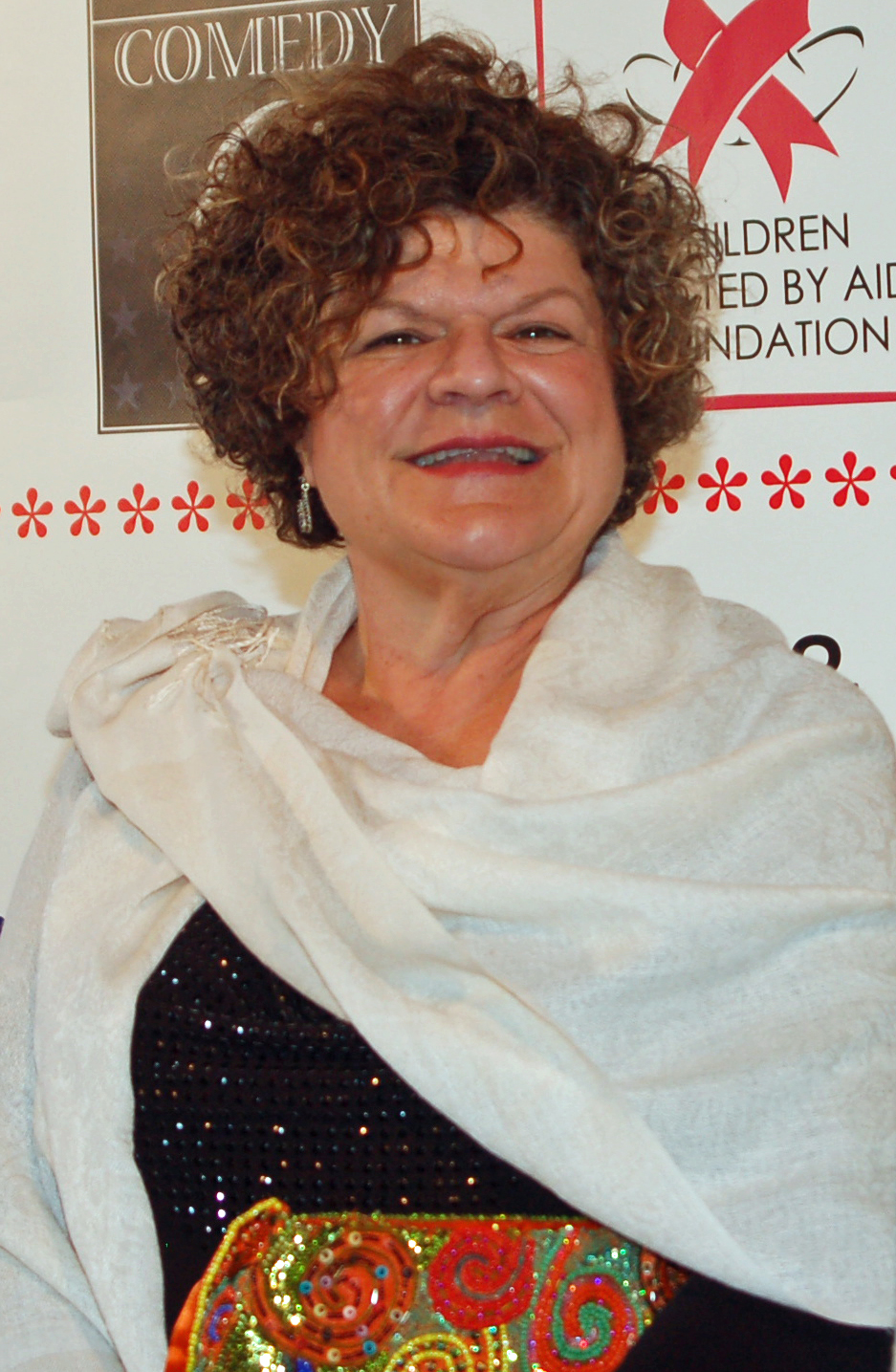
- Gleason in 2011
- Born: Mary Pat Gleason; February 23, 1950; Lake City, Minnesota, U.S.
- Died: June 2, 2020 (aged 70)
- Occupations: Actress, television writer
- Years active: 1982–2019

Mary Pat Gleason (February 23, 1950 – June 2, 2020) was an American film and television actress and an Emmy Award-winning writer. From 1983 to 1985, she appeared as "Jane Hogan" on the daytime soap opera Guiding Light, for which she was also a writer. She is also known for her regular role as Ida in the series The Middleman and her recurring role as Mary in the comedy drama series Mom.

== Life and career ==
Gleason was born in Lake City, Minnesota, the daughter of Mary Elizabeth (Kane) and Harold Clifford Gleason. During her high school years she starred in a local theater's production of Once Upon a Mattress.

Her first screen role was the a 1982 episode of Texas, a soap opera that aired on NBC. She appeared on, among many others, such television series as Full House, Dear John, Murphy Brown, Empty Nest, L.A. Law, Saved by the Bell, Friends, Sex and the City and Step by Step. She appeared in more than 50 feature films, including I Now Pronounce You Chuck & Larry, Basic Instinct, Traffic, Bruce Almighty, 13 Going on 30, The Crucible, Bottle Shock, A Cinderella Story, The Island, Killing Kennedy, and Nina. In one of her last roles, she voiced Professor Foxtrot in CollegeHumor's animated web series WTF 101.

== Writing ==
In addition to acting, Gleason also wrote for Guiding Light and was part of the team that won the 1986 Daytime Emmy for outstanding daytime drama series writing.

Gleason became a vocal proponent of mental health treatment, and in 2006 wrote and starred in Stopping Traffic, a one-woman play about her struggles with bipolar disorder. The play is now used as a teaching aid for the Mayo Clinic's mental health programs.

== Death ==
Gleason died of uterine cancer on June 2, 2020, at age 70.

== Filmography ==
=== Film ===
Year	Title	Role	Notes
1983	Easy Money	Party Mother	
1989	Troop Beverly Hills	Kindly Troop Leader	
1989	I, Madman	Policewoman	
1989	Fat Man and Little Boy	Dora Welsh	
1990	Vital Signs	Rotunda Woman	
1990	Pastime	Woman At Bar	
1991	Defending Your Life	The Waitress	
1991	Soapdish	Housewife	
1992	Basic Instinct	Juvenile Officer	
1992	Man Trouble	Vira	
1992	Lorenzo's Oil	The Librarian	
1994	Lookin' Italian	Casting Director	
1994	Holy Matrimony	Female Officer	
1994	Speechless	Desk Clerk	
1995	A Walk in the Clouds	Bus Driver	
1996	Infinity	County Nurse #2	
1996	The Crucible	Martha Corey	
1996	No Easy Way	Nurse Barb	
2000	Traffic	Witness #2	
2001	Evolution	Customer	
2002	Hometown Legend	Tee Naters	
2003	Bruce Almighty	Heavyish Woman	
2003	Cliché	Francesca DePesto	Short
2003	Intolerable Cruelty	Nero's Waitress	
2003	Grand Theft Parsons	Nurse	
2004	13 Going on 30	Mrs. Flamhaff	
2004	A Cinderella Story	Eleanor	
2005	Marilyn Hotchkiss' Ballroom Dancing & Charm School	Natasha	
2005	The Island	Nutrition Clerk	
2005	Underclassman	Ms. Hagerty	
2006	Lies & Alibis	Operator #3	
2006	One Sung Hero	Sara's Mom	Short
2006	Wristcutters: A Love Story	Eugene's Mother	
2006	Room 6	Nurse Holiday	
2007	Because I Said So	Iris	
2007	The Memory Thief	Hospital Patient	
2007	Nobel Son	Ruby	
2007	I Now Pronounce You Chuck & Larry	Teresa	
2007	Moving McAllister	Margerie	
2008	Bottle Shock	Marge	
2008	Drillbit Taylor	Mrs. Farber	
2010	Santa's Apprentice	Beatrice Lovejoy	English version, voice
2011	Bucky Larson: Born to Be a Star	Marge	
2011	I Love You Like Crazy	Yvette	Short
2012	Arcadia	Agnes	
2013	The Magic Snowflake	Beatrice Lovejoy	English version, voice
2014	Blended	Pharmacy Cashier	
2014	Earth to Echo	Dusty, Mullet Lady At Bar	
2014	Big Stone Gap	Alice Lambert	
2016	Why Him?	Joyce	
2016	Nina	Orderly	
2016	Ophelia	"Grumpy"	Short
2017	Fan Girl	Carla	
2018	Sierra Burgess Is a Loser	Counselor Stevens	
2020	Saving Paradise	Mary Williams	Posthumous release; final film role

=== Television ===
Year	Title	Role	Notes
1982	Texas	Doris Hodges	Episode: #1.617
1983-1984	Guiding Light	Jane Hogan	3 episodes
1987	Full House	Jennifer Sianski	Episode: "The Return of Grandma"
1987	Highway to Heaven	Lucille Perry	Episode: "Why Punish The Children"
1988	Mama's Family	Arlene Madison	Episode: "A Friend Indeed"
1988	Frank's Place	Mother Mae	Episode: "Night Business"
1988	The Secret Life of Kathy McCormick	Mary	Television film
1989	Those She Left Behind	Nurse Walker	Television film
1989	Murphy Brown	Olga	Episode: "Moscow on the Potomac"
1989	Peter Gunn	Nurse Pat	Television film
1989	Quantum Leap	Mrs. Thompson	Episode: "Camikazi Kid"
1989	Highway to Heaven	Bus Driver	Episode: "The Squeaky Wheel"
1989	Dear John	Secretary	Episode: "The Secret of Success"
1989	Life Goes On	Mrs. Martina Pasogian	Episode: "Pets, Guys and Videotape"
1989	Night Court	Sister Ruth Mae	Episode: "The Cop and the Lady"
1990	His & Hers	Mrs. Fishbain	Episode: "M Is for the Many Things She Lifted"
1990	Singer & Sons	Marilyn	Episode: "The Boxer Rebellion"
1990	Framed	Eunice	Television film
1990	Steel Magnolias	Janice Van Meter	Pilot (unsold)
1990	ABC Afterschool Specials	Mrs. Rupert	Episode: "Testing Dirty"
1990	Who's the Boss?	Diane	Episode: "Parental Guidance Suggested"
1990	Empty Nest	Nurse Bradford	Episode: "Honey, I Shrunk Laverne"
1990	Night Court	Eunice	Episode: "A Night Court at the Opera"
1990	L.A. Law	Edna Garth	Episode: "Vowel Play"
1990	Saved by the Bell	Madame Oeuf	Episode: "The Babysitters"
1991	Davis Rules	Rae	Episode: "Twisted Sister"
1991	In the Heat of the Night	Hostess	Episode: "Just a Country Boy"
1991	Perfect Strangers	Betty	Episode: "A Catered Affair"
1991	Top of the Heap	Mrs. Epstein	Episode: "The Agony and the Agony"
1991	Nurses	Off Duty Nurse	Episode: "Son of a Pilot"
1991	Murder, She Wrote	Reference Librarian	Episode: "Night Fears"
1991	Perry Mason: The Case of the Fatal Fashion	Amanda Cooper	Television film
1991	The Story Lady	The Receptionist	Television film
1992	The Golden Palace	Lost and Found Woman	Episode: "Miles, We Hardly Knew Ye"
1992	A Child Lost Forever: The Jerry Sherwood Story	Mrs. Rory	Television film
1993	Getting By	Mrs. Hanover	2 episodes
1993	Precious Victims	Waitress #1	Television film
1993	The Secrets of Lake Success	Lady Diner	3 episodes
1993	Coach	Winnie	Episode: "Piece o' Cake"
1993	Blossom	Woman	Episode: "Big Doings: Part 2"
1994	Children of the Dark	Lydia Fallbrook	Television film
1994	Good Advice	Carol	Episode: "Two Times Twenty"
1994	Friends	Nurse Sizemore	Episode: "The One with George Stephanopoulos"
1994	The 5 Mrs. Buchanans	Helen McConnell	Episode: "Nothing on Delilah"
1995	Lois & Clark: The New Adventures of Superman	Postal Inspector	Episode: "Metallo"
1995	Sister, Sister	Snaggle-Toothed Woman	Episode: "Kid in Play"
1995	Step by Step	Ms. Butkus	Episode: "Maid to Order"
2000-2017	Will & Grace	Bridget / Sally	4 episodes
2001	Malcolm in the Middle	Woman in Car	Episode: "Emancipation"
2001	Sex and the City	Lucille	Episode: "My Motherboard, Myself"
2004-2012	Desperate Housewives	Elenora Butters	3 episodes
2004	NCIS	Nurse Wells	Episode: ”The Bone Yard”
2008	The Middleman	Ida	Main Character
2009	Mentalist	Charlotte McAdoo	S2 E2: "The Scarlet Letter"
2010	Good Luck Charlie	Rita	Episode: "Take Mel Out to the Ball Game"
2012	Bones	Crystal Jones	Episode: "The Bump in the Road"
2012	2 Broke Girls	Blanche	Episode: "And the Cupcake War"
2013	Motive	Marion Reader	Episode: "Framed"
2013	Killing Kennedy	Marguerite Oswald	Television film
2014-2019	Mom	Mary	Recurring role
2016	How to Get Away with Murder	Robin Laforge	Episode: "What Happened to You, Annalise?"
2018	American Housewife	Mrs. Austin	Episode: "It's Not You, It's Me"
2019	The Blacklist	Agathe Tyche	Episode: "Lady Luck"

=== Animation ===
Year	Title	Role	Notes
2019	What the F 101	Professor Foxtrot	Season 1

=== Theater ===
Year	Title	Role	Notes
2006	Stopping Traffic	Herself	Vineyard Theatre

== Awards and nominations ==
Year	Award	Category	Title	Result
1986	Daytime Emmy Award	Outstanding Drama Series Writing Team	Guiding Light	Won
