= List of Robotboy episodes =

This is a list of Robotboy episodes. The animated series is about an ultra-advanced robot who has human-like expressions and emotions. It was co-produced by Alphanim, Cartoon Network, and France 3.

== Series overview ==
Season	Episodes	Originally released	
Season	Episodes	First released	Last released
1	26	November 1, 2005	March 8, 2006
2	26	October 29, 2007	September 27, 2008

== Episodes ==
=== Season 1 (2005–06) ===
All episodes of this season were directed by Charlie Bean.

No. overall	No. in season	Title	Written by	Original release date	Prod. code
1a	1a	"Dog-Ra"	Robert Mittenthal	November 1, 2005	
Tommy and Gus rescue a lost puppy in the street, and Tommy decides to keep him. Meanwhile, when Tommy and his family leave Robotboy alone in the house, the dog transforms into a half beast-half machine, with his sights set on Robotboy.
1b	1b	"War and Pieces"	Robert Mittenthal	November 1, 2005	
Tommy and Lola are mending Robotboy in the former's room when Gus barges in and knocks Robotboy's many parts onto the floor, losing Robotboy's aggro-capacitor. Without this piece, the little robot is unable to fight, thus Tommy must get Robotboy back to Professor Moshimo before evil attacks.
2a	2a	"Cleaning Day"	Cindy Morrow	November 2, 2005	
When Tommy goes out to the beach instead of cleaning his room, his mom flips out and gives away all his toys to an orphanage, including Robotboy.
2b	2b	"Constabot"	Robert Mittenthal	November 2, 2005	
Hoping to win Dr. Kamikazi's respect, Constantine builds his own robot to try and capture Robotboy. The heap of metal is so weak that, instead of smashing it, Robotboy takes pity and befriends him.
3a	3a	"Teasebots"	Michael Rubiner	November 3, 2005	
Dr. Kamikazi creates a new army of Teasebots to take advantage of Robotboy's temper. Robotboy destroys so many Teasebots that his batteries run dry and he is easily stolen by Kamikazi.
3b	3b	"Constantine Rising"	Scott Peterson	November 3, 2005	
With Dr. Kamikazi with a fever in the bed, Constantine decides to try a plot of his own. He kidnaps Lola and lures Tommy and Robotboy to Dr. Kamikazi's lair. Now, Gus is their last hope.
4a	4a	"Metal Monster"	Scott Peterson	November 4, 2005	
When a news reporter called Vance Cosgrove finds out about Robotboy, he tries to find more about him from other people so that he can become promoted, only that a secret government steals Robotboy into their laboratory and the gang must save him.
4b	4b	"Time Transmission"	Randolph Heard	November 4, 2005	
Robotboy receives a message from the future warning that he will over-run the world one day. The only way to protect the world is to hand himself over to Dr. Kamikazi.
5a	5a	"The Donnienator"	Randolph Heard	November 7, 2005	
Dr. Kamikazi turns Tommy's older brother, Donnie, into a Trojan Horse carrying his latest robot of destruction to serve his evil plans.
5b	5b	"Halloween"	Cindy Morrow	November 7, 2005	
Tommy and his friends are taking Robotboy out for his first Halloween, but when Dr. Kamikazi sends monsters out, he can't see what's real and what's not.
6a	6a	"Don't Fight It"	Scott Peterson	November 8, 2005	
When Robotboy has his Aggro meter high, he attacks - even a falling leaf - and fights everything. Tommy eventually sets his Aggro meter too low, making him unable to fight.
6b	6b	"Kurt's Father"	Andrew Rheingold	November 8, 2005	
Kurt's father, a special agent, shows up during career day and discovers Robotboy. He then sends his son to befriend Tommy so he can get Robotboy for him.
7a	7a	"Brother"	Cindy Morrow	November 9, 2005	
While Tommy is out on a family day, Robotboy is left alone. After talking to Moshimo, he tells Robotboy that he did have a brother once, called Protoboy. Robotboy goes to Kamikazi's island and when he frees Protoboy, he discovers that Protoboy is evil. Note: This episode marks the first appearance of Protoboy.
7b	7b	"Roughing It"	Scott Peterson	November 9, 2005	
While taken care of stopping another of Kamikazi's plans, the gang get stranded in a forest with Robotboy's power running low.
8a	8a	"I Want That Toy"	Andrew Rheingold	November 10, 2005	
When Kamikazi opens a toy store to attract Tommy and Gus, Tommy is falsely caught for stealing a robot toy, in this case, Robotboy.
8b	8b	"Sweet Revenge"	Robert Mittenthal and Michael Rubiner	November 10, 2005	
While Tommy is in hospital, Gus gets to be in charge of Robotboy. Kamikazi acknowledges it and comes up with an idea to distract Gus.
9a	9a	"Robot Love"	Michael Rubiner	November 11, 2005	
Robotboy and Gus convince Tommy to go to Robocon, a robot convention, and meet Mona Lethal.
9b	9b	"Brother Björn"	Randolph Heard	November 11, 2005	
A genius child named Bjorn Bjornson, a former student to Moshimo, wants to get Robotboy and destroy him in a fight with his own robot, Bjornbot, to prove he has the best fighting robot in the world.
10a	10a	"The Boy Who Cried Kamikazi"	Andrew Rheingold	November 14, 2005	
Moshimo gives Robotboy the power to freeze everything in sight.
10b	10b	"Christmas Evil"	Robert Mittenthal	November 14, 2005	
When Tommy and the gang see that Kamikazi wants to take over Christmas, they figure out a plan to stop him from taking over the holiday.
11a	11a	"Underwater"	Andrew Rheingold	November 15, 2005	
When Tommy's father, Dwight, receives a letter winning a free boat hiking, he brings Tommy, Gus, and Donnie to go out fishing only that the boat is being spied on by Kamikazi.
11b	11b	"Kamikazi Nightmare"	Richard D. Pursel	November 15, 2005	
Kamikazi uses a nightmare-gun towards Tommy in order to have a frightful nightmare when he sleeps and as a result, he gets it and suddenly activates Robotboy to kill the things from his dream.
12a	12a	"Human Fist on Ice"	Robert Mittenthal	November 16, 2005	
Kamikazi uses a hypnotizing method of control an ice performer to get Robotboy while on an ice presentation with Tommy, Gus and Lola's favorite superhero: The Human Fist.
12b	12b	"Robot Rebels"	Randolph Heard	November 16, 2005	
When Lola feels disappointed to Tommy for spending more time with Robotboy than her, her father comes up an idea to make it more fun for Tommy to be more with Lola.
13a	13a	"Crying Time"	Richard Liebmann-Smith	November 17, 2005	
When Robotboy sees Tommy crying, he too wants to be able to cry in order to become more like a real boy. Kamikazi sees this as a good opportunity to capture Robotboy, as ‘”crying” would use up Robotboy's oil and thereby incapacitate him, so he invites Tommy and Gus to see a sad play. Whilst Tommy and Gus are bored to tears, Robotboy sheds tears as he relates to the story. When all his oil dries up, Kamikazi steals Robotboy and reprograms him to serve his evil need. Robotboy and Kamikazi's ant clones try to finish Tommy once and for all, whilst Gus hides in Kamikazi's fridge.
13b	13b	"Runaway Robot (1)"	Richard D. Pursel	November 17, 2005	
With his healed Bjorn Bjornson (one-time Moshimo protégé) witnesses Robotboy's urge to become a real boy and advertises his services to turn robots into humans. Robotboy is confused, as Moshimo has told him no robot can become a real boy, but still he ventures off to investigate. On arrival, Bjorn preps Robotboy for the operation that will turn him into a boy called Bobby. When Moshimo and Tommy arrive, not only have they got to rescue Robotboy from Bjorn and his fearsome robot, Brother Bjorn, but they must also convince Robotboy that Bjorn is lying. A battle of power and trust ensues, the only question is, who will prevail? Note: This is the first of two episodes that share the same title of "Runaway Robot".
14a	14a	"Robotman"	Scott Peterson	February 20, 2006	
Professor Moshimo creates a new ultra powerful adult version of Robotboy, and names him Robotman. Tommy, Gus, and Lola are amazed with Robotman's ultra strength and super powers, and Robotboy soon becomes neglected.
14b	14b	"A Tale of Two Evil Geniuses"	Darrick Bachman	February 20, 2006	
Much to his annoyance, Dr. Kamikazi loses out again at the annual Evil Genius awards, once again, to super villain General Yakitori. When Constantine stands up for his boss, the rest of audience mock and jeer Kamikazi. Eventually it is decided the only way to conclusively prove who is the best evil genius, is to see who can capture Robotboy.
15a	15a	"Something About Stevie"	Darrick Bachman	February 21, 2006	
Dr. Kamikazi creates a huge boar clone called Stevie to help him capture Robotboy. When the boar turns out to be too soft, Kamikazi orders Constantine to get rid of him. However, Constantine accidentally exposes Stevie to toxic waste and suddenly Stevie turns into the hideous monster that Kamikazi had hoped.
15b	15b	"The Homecoming"	Scott Peterson	February 21, 2006	
Tommy receives a message from Professor Moshimo and tells them that Kamikazi has been defeated and demands him to Robotboy to him. But when it turns out that Moshimo is actually Kamikazi, Tommy, Gus, and Lola go to rescue Robotboy.
16a	16a	"Kindergarten Kaos"	Scott Peterson	February 22, 2006	
Tommy and Gus get to become caretakers to kindergaten children while Dr. Kamikazi finds out a plan to use the children to catch Robotboy.
16b	16b	"Robot Girl"	Cindy Morrow	February 22, 2006	
When Robotboy can't follow Tommy on his family trip, he is sent to Professor Moshimo's flying house together with him, Miumiu and an all new friend for Robotboy, Robotgirl, the female version of Robotboy himself, to keep him in company.
17a	17a	"Bambi-Bot"	Michael Rubiner	February 23, 2006	
Dr. Kamikazi builds a robotic version of Tommy's crush, Bambi, in order to get Robotboy.
17b	17b	"Double Tommy"	Randolph Heard	February 23, 2006	
Dr. Kamikazi turns a spy named Evil 17 into a clone of Tommy and change him with the fake one, get Robotboy and do something terrible to the real Tommy.
18a	18a	"Tether Tommy"	Michael Rubiner	February 24, 2006	
While Robotboy feels angry at Donnie hurting Tommy at tether ball, he flies to the ball of the tether ball and hits hardly to Donnie, only that Dwight believes it was Tommy who hit the ball and takes him to the Tether Ball Tournament.
18b	18b	"The Tune Up"	Randolph Heard	February 24, 2006	
Gus uses Robotboy to download the latest video game technology, but Robotboy catches a computer virus and starts thinking that everyone is an alien.
19a	19a	"Shelf-Life"	Michael Rubiner	February 27, 2006	
Princess Justine, a spoiled princess from Fardonia, comes to Bay Area and visits Lola's house only to find about Robotboy and becomes fond to have him, but Tommy refuses. Justine gets help from Tommy's brother, Donnie, to give Robotboy to her only that an important update that didn't finish completely, would become dangerous for him.
19b	19b	"The Babysitter"	Darrick Bachman	February 27, 2006	
Tommy, Donnie, and Gus gets a babysitter for the night, only that she isn't the babysitter they've waited for.
20a	20a	"The Manchurian Robot"	Michael Rubiner	February 28, 2006	
Special Agent re-programs Robotboy to get the fake ambassador Von der Schnitzel in his hands.
20b	20b	"Door to Door"	Josh A. Cagan and Howard Rabinowitz	February 28, 2006	
The gang and the children of the school will be selling chocolate to the neighbors in Bay Area and the one who sells most will win a trip to the chocolate factory of the town. But turns out this chocolate factory is another trap made by Dr. Kamikazi to catch Robotboy.
21a	21a	"The Consultant"	Robert Mittenthal	March 1, 2006	
After having a meeting with Brian, a criminal consultant, Kamikazi fires Constantine and hires the consultant that helped him to find new ways to get Robotboy.
21b	21b	"Feline Frenzy"	Richard D. Pursel	March 1, 2006	
Kamikazi kidnaps every cats in the Bay Area, including Lola's kitten, Princess and turns them into stone-aged beasts using his evolution-gun.
22a	22a	"Attack of the Killer G-Men"	Robert Mittenthal	March 2, 2006	
Dr. Kamikazi decides to create clones of Gus with different appearances such as T-Rexes to become his new soldiers, due to him thinking that stupid clones are superior.
22b	22b	"Party Out of Bounds"	Robert Mittenthal	March 2, 2006	
Donnie is having a birthday party, while Tommy is not invited at all, but Gus insist to go in. Meanwhile, some of Robotboy's arch-enemies comes into Donnie's party to find Robotboy.
23a	23a	"Tummy Trouble"	Daniel Lennard	March 3, 2006	
Gus becomes unusually thin because of a tape-worm that he names Walter. Walter becomes his new friend, but unfortunately, he's working for Dr. Kamikazi.
23b	23b	"Valentine's Day"	Cindy Morrow	March 3, 2006	
When the kids celebrates Valentine's Day, Dr. Kamikazi thinks off a way to kidnap Tommy and his friends Gus and Lola, including Robotboy.
24a	24a	"Fight"	Darrick Bachman	March 6, 2006	
After resident beauty Bambi kisses him on the cheek to make Kurt jealous, Kurt and his crew coerced Tommy to have a fight with them at school recess. Meanwhile, Tommy finds out a way to make the rumble easier by using neural-synchronizing hats between him and Robotboy, allowing the automata to pass his fighting skills onto Tommy.
24b	24b	"Cast Iron Constantine"	Richard Pursel	March 6, 2006	
Kamikazi sends Constantine to Tommy's school in order to get Robotboy, the thing that distracts him is that he falls in love with Margaret, one of the school's teachers.
25a	25a	"Kamispazi"	Robert Mittenthal	March 7, 2006	
In Mother's Day, Dr. Kamikazi sends a gift card to Tommy to give it to his mother Debs to appear at a spa made from him, while sending Constantine, disguised as Debs, to get Robotboy.
25b	25b	"Kami-Chameleon"	Robert Mittenthal and Michael Rubiner	March 7, 2006	
Kamikazi sends out his Kami-Chamaleons to disguised as the teachers to Tommy in his school. When Tommy finds out, he sends out Robotboy in order not to get caught.
26a	26a	"Wrestling with Gus"	Andrew Rheingold	March 8, 2006	
Gus becomes so inspired by wrestling tournaments and he creates his own wrestling arena in Tommy's yard. He starts to wrestle with Kurt and his gang, while Special Agent tries to get involved with the fight in order to get Robotboy.
26b	26b	"Soothsayer"	Scott Peterson	March 8, 2006	
When Tommy installs a prediction ability to Robotboy, Gus takes advantage of this and uses the new ability to predict things. Note: This is the season finale.

=== Season 2 (2007–08) ===
All episodes of this season were directed by Bob Camp and Heath Kenny.

No. overall	No. in season	Title	Written by	Original release date	Prod. code
27a	1a	"Six Million Euro Man"	Robert Mittenthal and Michael Rubiner	October 29, 2007	
The billionaire Klaus Von Affenkugel wants Professor Moshimo to help change him from a puny weakling into a strong man. When he sees Robotboy, he gets a better idea: he steals Robotboy and begins attaching our hero's super-powerful limbs to his own body. Tommy, Gus and Lola arrive to save the day.
27b	1b	"RoboGus and the G-Machine"	Robert David	October 29, 2007	
When Tommy prepares an all new upgrade for Robotboy, Gus suddenly drops his breakfast into Robotboy's head and while trying to get it out, he reaches his tongue inside and gets electrified which leads to him and Robotboy gets their minds switched to each one from other bodies.
28a	2a	"Foot Brawl"	Roger Aylward, Robert Mittenthal, and Michael Rubiner	October 30, 2007	
While being in a football arena, Tommy and his team are losing and decide to give Robotboy a chance to play in order to win.
28b	2b	"Remote Out of Control"	Robert Mittenthal and Michael Rubiner	October 30, 2007	
When Tommy and Gus can't watch television because of Deb, the boys find a way to watch using Robotboy. With a little screen, they can watch television for free, the only problem is that depending on which channel they watch, Robotboy mimics the presentations.
29a	3a	"Hair-A-Parent"	Scott Tuft	November 1, 2007	
Robotboy becomes desperate to have his own mother and when he's at diner, he finds a waitress who he believes is his mother.
29b	3b	"Clammadon Rising"	Robert David, Robert Mittenthal, and Michael Rubiner	November 1, 2007	
Robotboy starts to believe that there are monsters around Japan, so he decides to fly in the country and stop them, only that he has mistaken the monsters between real life and fantasy.
30a	4a	"Bad Language"	Dani Vetere	November 2, 2007	
When Robotboy learns how his voice sounds and speaks, he becomes disappointed, but he receives a letter with a CD that says that it can enhance his voice speaking. The only problem lies within the CD that somehow controls him to steal things and turns him evil.
30b	4b	"Up a Tree"	Nick Gibbons	November 2, 2007	
After Donnie wrecking the gang's tree-house they were building, they decide to create a stronger tree-house with more technology and more secure to Donnie himself.
31a	5a	"Wunderpark"	Joe Orrantia	November 5, 2007	
Tommy and the gang gets invited to a new park called "Wunderpark". Unfortunately, it is being controlled by Klaus Von Affenkugel in order to get Robotboy.
31b	5b	"Zap! You're Old"	Robert Mittenthal and Michael Rubiner	November 5, 2007	
When the gang are playing gun-water-war, Constantine uses Kamikazi's newest weapon that can make things become older. He manages to zap at Lola, Gus and Robotboy, but luckily not to Tommy.
32a	6a	"Racer Zero"	Christopher E. Downes	November 6, 2007	
The gang are preparing for the annual racing tournament of Bay Area.
32b	6b	"The Legend of Brainy Yak"	Bob Camp, Robert Mittenthal, and Michael Rubiner	November 6, 2007	
Professor Moshimo tells the story about an old animal friend called Brian, a yak from his childhood, whom he made smarter.
33a	7a	"Nursing a Grudge"	Adam Cohen	November 7, 2007	
Gus is trying to get away from a test until he comes to the school nurse, who is his arch enemy Felonious Hexx. Note: This episode aired before Tragic Magic, even though it takes place after this episode.
33b	7b	"Stuck on You"	Adam Cohen	November 7, 2007	
When Klaus Von Affenkugel tries and fails to convince Tommy to hand him over Robotboy, he finds a way to get him by himself using a very big and strong magnet to catch Robotboy to use his body to attempt his revenge on the bullies for his Goober Scout reunion.
34a	8a	"The Sleepover"	Adam Cohen	November 8, 2007	
When Robotboy can't follow Tommy and Gus to the sleepover party with their friends, he suddenly gets an invitation to a different sleepover party with robots.
34b	8b	"Rowho?"	Rick Groel	November 8, 2007	
When Robotboy gets dirty, Tommy finds a robot polish from nowhere and uses it to Robotboy, but unfortunately, it somehow made him lose some of his memories and can't remember anything from his past.
35a	9a	"C.H.O.P"	Tim Madison	November 9, 2007	
Robotboy gets to meet his idol C.H.O.P., the famous helicopter from a TV show. When they spend their time together, they find out is that C.H.O.P.'s partner Lance Chestwax is replacing him with a new mechanical companion called S.U.B.
35b	9b	"Destroy All Robots"	Robert Mittenthal and Michael Rubiner	November 9, 2007	
When Gus take Robotboy from Tommy and use him to battle with robot toys in a competition, the school principal Culpepper takes Robotboy with her plus the watch. Now, Tommy and his gang need to save him.
36a	10a	"Science Fear"	Larry Hama	November 12, 2007	
Kurt steals a giant robot from his father's lab and wants to use it in the school science fair.
36b	10b	"Automatommy"	Randolph Heard	November 12, 2007	
Tommy and Professor Moshimo had created a powerful exoskeleton-belt that will give the ability to have super strength like Robotboy's super-activation, but when using it for a long time, it becomes berserk of destruction.
37a	11a	"Mancation"	Robert Mittenthal and Michael Rubiner	November 13, 2007	
Tommy tells Robotboy to stay home while he, Dwight and Donnie take a trip in the woods.
37b	11b	"Journey to the Center of the Gus"	Adam Cohen	November 13, 2007	
Bjorn Bjornson has created a killer nano-bot and put it inside of a soap that he will send to Tommy in order to destroy Robotboy. Luckily for Tommy, Gus eats the soap, and Robotboy has to save him from being exploded by the nano-bot.
38a	12a	"Traffic Slam"	Larry Hama	November 14, 2007	
While being stuck in traffic, the villains of Kamikazi and Affenkugel tries to come around to get Robotboy.
38b	12b	"Tragic Magic"	Heath Kenny	November 14, 2007	
Robotboy, Tommy and Gus visit a magic show featuring Felonious Hexx. When Gus makes fun of him, through the show transports him into his magical world, where the magician going to make Gus suffer.
39a	13a	"Ooh That Smell"	Robert Mittenthal and Michael Rubiner	November 15, 2007	
Robotboy gets an all new ability to smell with an artificial and technological nose.
39b	13b	"Museum Madness"	Chris Brown	November 15, 2007	
While the gang is at the Bay Area Museum, it's going to close, but Robotboy gets left behind and only Tommy and his friends must get back him.
40a	14a	"Gus' Big Mouth"	Randolph Heard	July 5, 2008	
When Gus has very bad breath, Tommy and Robotboy take him to the dentist to clean his teeth. Unfortunately, the dentist happens to be Felonious Hexx, that as his revenge, gives Gus a golden teeth which will make him say undesirable things to many different peoples.
40b	14b	"Small Problems"	Nick Gibbons	July 5, 2008	
Robotboy brings the Human Fist and Inhuman Toe toys to life, but when the toys find out they are supposed to be enemies, they bring rampage to each other.
41a	15a	"Vitamin Sucker"	Joe Orrantia	July 7, 2008	
Klaus Von Affenkugel gets visited from the Consultant to offer him a machine, that will make him super strong by receiving all kinds of vitamins.
41b	15b	"Ogbot"	Randolph Heard	July 7, 2008	
Robotboy, Tommy and Gus discovers an unfinished robot called Ogbot, developed for a lunar expedition, who believes he's already on the moon, despite being on Earth.
42a	16a	"Runaway Robot (2)"	Bob Camp, Robert Mittenthal, and Michael Rubiner	July 19, 2008	
Robotboy gets mad at Tommy for almost never being allowed to do whatever he wants that's fun. However, Robotboy decides to runaway and live with Gus. Note: This is the second and last of two episodes that share the same title ("Runaway Robot"), the first being episode 13b of season 1.
42b	16b	"Grow-No-Mo!"	Dani Vetere, Robert Mittenthal, and Michael Rubiner	July 19, 2008	
Robotboy feels sad for being a little short all the time, but after speaking with Moshimo, he finds out that he has an ability to grow a little bigger...until he becomes a giant.
43a	17a	"Aunty Gravitee"	Larry Hama	July 26, 2008	
A freak-show director called Aunty Gravitee kidnaps Gus and forces him to perform comical show-ups.
43b	17b	"Cheezy Fun for Everyone"	Howard Rabinowitz	July 26, 2008	
Tommy and his gang gets invited to Chucky's Cheese-O-Rama restaurant for celebrate Robotboy's birthday party, while Kamikazi and Constantine are watching over to get him into the birthday.
44a	18a	"The Curse of Truckenstein"	Nick Gibbons	August 2, 2008	
During a Monster-Truck presentation, Gus is possessed by the most dangerous and cursed of all the Monster-Trucks, Truckenstein, who makes him his driver. It's up to Robotboy, Tommy and Lola to break the curse.
44b	18b	"Robolympics"	Adam Cohen	August 2, 2008	
Robotboy enters the first ever Robolympics, where his competitors are Bjorn Bjornson's robot Bjornbot, Ronald Rump's trash talking robot Cruelio, and Constabot, a poorly disguised Constantine.
45a	19a	"Knockoffs"	Adam Cohen	August 9, 2008	
When Tommy and Gus, including Robotboy, are in the electrical store, a teenaged employer discovers Robotboy and makes knockoffs of him to sell in the store.
45b	19b	"Gus' Mix"	Nick Gibbons	August 9, 2008	
Gus takes a chemical additive made for Robotboy and uses it as an energy drink, which has the side effect of turning people into monsters.
46a	20a	"Robotboy's Fifteen Minutes"	Larry Hama	August 16, 2008	
When Tommy and Lola leaves Gus and Robotboy alone to they play videogame with each other, Gus posts a music video of Robotboy to become famous.
46b	20b	"The Old Switcharobot"	Dani Vetere	August 16, 2008	
Robotboy's evil brother, Protoboy, defeats him and swaps his motherboard with Robotboy's, so that he can get to Professor Moshimo much easier.
47a	21a	"I Hero!"	Dani Vetere	August 23, 2008	
Feeling jealous that Tommy and his gang believes a comic book character is a big hero than he is, Robotboy decides to become a superhero and prevent many peoples from dangers, saving their lives.
47b	21b	"Rats!"	Larry Hama	August 23, 2008	
When Dr. Kamikazi infests Tommy's house with cloned rats, he poses as an exterminator in order to get in the place and use his "turbo mousetrap" on Robotboy.
48a	22a	"Udder Madness"	Heath Kenny, Robert Mittenthal, and Michael Rubiner	August 30, 2008	
Tommy and Gus, including Robotboy, spend the day at a ranch, where they have to do lots of unpleasant chores.
48b	22b	"Bad Nanny!"	Adam Cohen	August 30, 2008	
When Tommy and Gus become a bit messy, Debbie calls for a house nanny. However, Felonious Hexx, disguised as a nanny, makes it harder for the boys.
49a	23a	"Bowling for Dummies"	Larry Hama	September 13, 2008	
While out bowling, Tommy, Gus, Lola and Robotboy are challenged to a bowl-off by the villains Dr. Kamikazi and Klaus Von Affenkugel.
49b	23b	"Tween for a Day"	Adam Cohen	September 13, 2008	
Professor Moshimo gives for Robotboy a cybernetic skin, which enables him to impersonate a real boy for only six hours.
50a	24a	"Donnie Turnbull's Day Off"	Robert Mittenthal and Michael Rubiner	September 16, 2008	
Donnie pretends to be sick and can stay home to destroy Robotboy for attacking him.
50b	24b	"Robomonkey Shines"	Tim Madison	September 16, 2008	
Tommy gives Robotboy a new friend: a little robomonkey to be with him when Tommy's at school. It's only matter of time, until Robomonkey becomes an annoying house-wrecker.
51a	25a	"The Revenge of Protoboy"	Robert Mittenthal and Michael Rubiner	September 20, 2008	
Protoboy returns and plans a revenge against Robotboy.
51b	25b	"Everybody Loves Grandma"	Robert Mittenthal and Michael Rubiner	September 20, 2008	
During a visit by Tommy's grandmother in the Turnbull's house, General Yakitori prepares the attack of his robot to destroy the family, as he does not have his own.
52a	26a	"The Return of Robotgirl"	Robert Mittenthal and Michael Rubiner	September 27, 2008	
During a sleepover at Tommy's house, Robotgirl lands in the yard with memory damage and he, Robotboy and Gus tries to help her remember the details. When Lola solves her problem, Robotgirl takes the gang to an abandoned titanium factory where Professor Moshimo was captured by Protoboy.
52b	26b	"Momma's Boy"	Adam Cohen	September 27, 2008	
While Kaziland is having a renovation, Dr. Kamikazi and Constantine decide to live with Kamikazi's old mother, a resident of Bay Area. Meanwhile, Tommy and Gus try to get into different houses and ask them about cooking with insects quartely. Note: This is the series finale.
