= Jan Van Rijsselberge =

Belgian creator, designer and producer

Jan Van Rijsselberge is a Belgian creator, designer and producer, who is credited on multiple animated TV series, including Robotboy, Hairy Scary and Santa's Apprentice.

After getting a diploma in Animation Film Directing in Gent (Belgium), Rijsselberge began his career as an animator and a supervisor. In 1996, he co-directed Lil' Elvis Jones and the Truckstoppers. For over a decade, he has been the creative director at Alphanim in Paris, where he created series such as Robotboy, Hairy Scary, X-DuckX, Zombie Hotel, Sophie, Spaced Out, Gawayn, Delta State, Matt's Monsters, Potatoes and Dragons, Ralf the Record Rat, The Mysteries of Alfred Hedgehog, The Baskervilles, Spencer, The Small Giant, and Santa's Apprentice. Rijsselberge is currently Studio 100's creative director, working primarily at their Paris office. One of his specialties as of 2010 is taking traditional 2D animated shows such as Maya the Bee and Vicky the Viking and modernizing them for a full CG animation production. In 2013, he created the show Dude, That's My Ghost!.

Rijsselberge was a loyal friend of French animator, storyboard artist and filmmaker Olivier Jean-Marie.

== Filmography ==
Year(s)	Production	Role
1997–1999	Animal Crackers	Animation supervisor
2000	The Baskervilles	Designer
2001–2002	X-DuckX	Creator
2002	Spaced Out	Designer
2003–2004	Ralf the Record Rat	Creator, designer
2003–2004	Cosmic Cowboys	Creator, designer, credited as Eddy Marx
2004	Potatoes and Dragons	Creator, designer
2004	Delta State	Designer
2004–2005	Woofy	Designer
2005–2008	Robotboy	Creator
2005	Zombie Hotel	Creator, designer
2006	SantApprentice	Creator, designer
2007	Hairy Scary	Creator, designer
2008–2009	Matt's Monsters	Creator, designer
2009–2013	Gawayn	Creator, designer
2010	The Mysteries of Alfred Hedgehog	Designer
2010	The Small Giant	Creator, designer
2013	Dude, That's My Ghost!	Creator, designer
2013–2014	Vic the Viking	Adapted by, art director
2015–2016	Heidi	Creator, art director, animation director
2015–2016	The Adventures of K3	Art director
2017	Nils Holgersson	Developer
2021–2022	The Smurfs	Production consultant (season 1)
2023	Sunnyside Billy	Creator

== Awards and nominations ==
Year	Award	Work	Category	Result	Reference
2007	SACD Awards	—N/a	Animation Award	Won	
