= Robotboy =

Animated television series

- Genre: Science fantasy Action-adventure; Mecha; Superhero; Comedy
- Created by: Jan Van Rijsselberge
- Written by: Robert Mittenthal; Michael Rubiner
- Directed by: Charlie Bean (season 1); Bob Camp (season 2); Heath Kenny (season 2)
- Voices of: Laurence Bouvard; Lorraine Pilkington; Rupert Degas; Lewis MacLeod; Togo Igawa; Eiji Kusuhara
- Composer: Hans Helewaut
- Countries of origin: United Kingdom; France; Luxembourg (season 1)
- Original languages: English; French
- No. of seasons: 2
- No. of episodes: 52 (104 segments) (list of episodes)

Production
- Executive producers: Christian Davin; Clément Calvet; Daniel Lennard; Finn Arnesen (season 1)
- Editors: Amélie Degouys (season 1); Cédric Chaveau (season 2)
- Running time: 23 minutes (11 minutes per segment)
- Production companies: Alphanim; LuxAnimation (season 1); Cofinova 1 (season 1)

Original release
- Network: Cartoon Network (UK); France 3 (France)
- Release: 1 November 2005 – 27 September 2008

Robotboy is an animated television series that aired from 1 November 2005 to 27 September 2008 on Cartoon Network in the UK. (Note: Prior to debuting its airdate, the series was shown during the MIPCOM annual trading program on October 12, 2005.) In the United States, it aired on Cartoon Network, premiering on 14 January 2006, after a sneak peek on 28 December 2005 (under their "Sneak Peek Week" for their new lineup). In France, it aired on France 3. Reruns of the series were broadcast around Europe and Latin America, with fewer exceptions shown in Asia.

The series was created by Jan Van Rijsselberge (also a designer) and produced by Alphanim (now Gaumont Animation) at the company's studio in Vincennes, which the inspiration for the series came from Rijsselberge's son, who was bullied by friends at school and confided that he wanted a robot to protect him, which served as the basis for the protagonist. Season 1, produced in association with studios LuxAnimation and Cofinova 1, was directed by American animator Charlie Bean (who worked on Dexter's Laboratory, The Powerpuff Girls, and Samurai Jack); Season 2 was directed by Bob Camp and Heath Kenny. 52 episodes (104 segments) were produced.

== Plot ==
Robotboy is the latest creation of the world-renowned scientist Professor Moshimo. Due to suspicions that Robotboy would be taken by his arch enemy Dr. Kamikazi and his main henchman Constantine to be used to take over the world, Professor Moshimo entrusts Robotboy to 10-year-old Tommy Turnbull, his biggest fan living in San Francisco. While being protected by Tommy and his two friends Augustus (or "Gus" for short) and Lola, Robotboy learns how to behave and act as if he was a human while occasionally battling Kamikazi and Constantine who pursue to capture him.

== Episodes ==
Season	Episodes	Originally released	
Season	Episodes	First released	Last released
1	26	November 1, 2005	March 8, 2006
2	26	October 29, 2007	September 27, 2008

== Characters ==
=== Main characters ===
- Robotboy (voiced by Laurence Bouvard) – The titular character and protagonist who is best friends with Tommy Turnbull. He is a robot created by Professor Moshimo as a force to protect the world from threats after Protoboy failed, as he was captured and reprogrammed by Dr. Kamikazi. Robotboy was sent to live with Tommy for his own protection.
- Tommy Turnbull (voiced by Lorraine Pilkington) – Robotboy's 10-year-old owner and human best friend. He acts as a role model and mentor figure to Robotboy and cares deeply for him. Unlike Gus, he is bright, sensible, kind, and responsible, although he gets criticized by his father Dwight for being rather nerdy and not getting enough exercise.
- Augustus "Gus"/"G-Man" Bachman Turner (voiced by Rupert Degas) – Tommy's goofy and naive best friend. Despite coming from an Amish family, Gus is "the black sheep" of the bunch and is infatuated with food and video games. Unlike Tommy, Gus tends to be much more rude and self-centered in nature and it is usually this that gets everyone into situations caused by Dr. Kamikazi.
- Lola Mbola (voiced by Laurence Bouvard) – Lola is the 10-year-old daughter of African ambassador, Kingsley Mbola. She is confident and intelligent, being able to fly jet planes and control speed boats.

=== Supporting characters ===
- Professor Akira Moshimo (voiced by Togo Igawa) – Professor Moshimo is the creator of Robotboy, Robotgirl, Protoboy, and Robotman. He received a letter from Tommy Turnbull about him looking forward to his latest invention. As a result, he sent him Robotboy to take care of.
  - Miu-Miu (voiced by Laurence Bouvard) – Professor Moshimo's girlfriend and lab assistant. She is typically depicted as silent, however, she speaks for the first time in the episode "Grow No-Mo".
- Robotgirl (voiced by Laurence Bouvard) – Robotboy's female counterpart and younger sister.

=== Villains ===
- Dr. Otomo Kamikazi II (voiced by Eiji Kusuhara) – A self-proclaimed evil genius and the main antagonist of the series. He wishes to capture Robotboy to create a template for an army of super robots, with which he will be able to achieve world domination.
  - Constantine (voiced by Rupert Degas) – A hunchbacked henchman of Dr. Kamikazi who also is a master of sumo wrestling. He is the secondary antagonist of the series.
- Donnie Turnbull (voiced by Rupert Degas) – Tommy's older brother and secondary archenemy, he is a constant bully to every child in the neighborhood, including Gus and Tommy himself. Some people exploit his attitude and poor intelligence for their benefit, usually Dr. Kamikazi.
- Kurt (voiced by Rupert Degas) – A bully at Tommy's school who constantly bullies Gus and Tommy, as well as any other kid he finds. His dad is a government agent who has used Kurt to try and capture Robotboy. Tommy sometimes has outsmarted Kurt and his cronies by outwitting them, usually with Robotboy.
    - Kurt's Father/Special Agent (voiced by Lewis MacLeod) – A secret agent who strives to take Robotboy to reproduce him so he can use him for government means. His base is located in the Transamerica Pyramid.
  - Stu and Mookie (both voiced by Rupert Degas) – Kurt's friends/henchmen. Stu is the largest and least intelligent of the group. He wears a blue hoodie with a red cap. Mookie is the smallest bully in the group, in the absence of Kurt, is the leader.
  - Bambi – A queen bee-like character and Tommy's love interest. Despite being clearly out of his league and already having Kurt as a boyfriend, Tommy still attempts to get her attention despite being treated like he does not exist.
- Björn Björnson (voiced by Lewis MacLeod) – A Nordic egotistical boy genius who is about Tommy's age and claims to be a greater genius than Professor Moshimo. He has his own robot double named Björnbot, who is sometimes referred to as Brother Björn. Their mission is to destroy Moshimo's creation Robotboy, so Björnbot would be "the greatest fighting robot in the world".
  - Björnbot/Brother Björn – Björnbot is a robotic lookalike of his creator Björn Björnson. He has weapon capabilities and strength equal to that of Robotboy—as well as superactivation. Unlike Robotboy, he lacks emotion and has a flat vocabulary (which consists mostly of the word "Ja!").
- Protoboy (voiced by Lewis MacLeod) – Robotboy's long-lost brother, who was created by Moshimo in his earlier years. He was later taken by Dr. Kamikazi and Constantine and reprogrammed, forcing him into evil.
- Klaus Von Affenkugel (voiced by Rupert Degas) – A wealthy man from Germany who wants to use Robotboy's parts to replace his own. Affenkugel is frail and has been mistreated since childhood because of his condition.
  - Ludwig – An orangutan who is Affenkugel's assistant.
- Felonious Hexx – A magician who had his career ruined after getting ridiculed and humiliated by Gus during a performance. He is always ready to get back at Gus and/or possibly kill him given the chance.
- Principal Dr. Friedman-Culpepper (voiced by Lewis MacLeod) – Tommy's principal and nemesis. She abuses her position as principal to confiscate toys and play with them herself, having been denied toys as a child.
  - Mr. Yashinky – A janitor who is Friedman-Culpepper's henchman.
- Brainy-Yak – A yak who was made fun of due to his low intelligence. Professor Moshimo gave the yak a brain transplant to enhance his intelligence, which resulted in him being ostracized even more. After disappearing for a few decades, Brainy-Yak returns, seeking revenge for being excluded and being mistreated by Moshimo.

== Reception ==
Emily Ashby of Common Sense Media rated the show 2/5 stars, stating that "with its monotonous plotlines and a villain whose common sense is questionable, Robotboy is a mediocre choice."

== Home video and digital releases ==
StudioCanal released three DVD volumes of Robotboy from 2007 only in France. As of October 2019, Season 2 is currently available on Starz's streaming service in the United States, leaving Season 1 currently unavailable. The complete series has been made available in both English and French via YouTube.

== See also ==
- My Life as a Teenage Robot – an American cartoon with a similar premise of a robot trying to be a normal teenager.
