= List of Polish television series =

The following is a list of television series produced in Poland:

== Adventure ==
- The Alaska Kid
- Dwa światy
- Gazda z Diabelnej
- Gruby
- Janosik
- Oko proroka czyli Hanusz Bystry i jego przygody
- Plecak pełen przygód
- Przygody pana Michała
- Przyłbice i kaptury
- Rycerze i rabusie
- Samochodzik i templariusze
- The Secret of Sagal
- Siedem życzeń
- Tajna misja
- Trzy szalone zera
- W krainie Władcy Smoków
- Wakacje z duchami
- WOW

== Animated ==
- 1000 złych uczynków
- Agi Bagi
- Andzia
- Bajka o trzech smokach
- Bajki Bolka i Lolka
- Bajki Pana Bałagana
- Bajki zza okna
- Bajki świata
- Bardzo przygodowe podróże Kulfona
- Baśnie i bajki polskie
- Baśnie i waśnie
- Bolek and Lolek
- Bolek i Lolek na Dzikim Zachodzie (animated series)
- Bolek i Lolek na wakacjach
- Bolek i Lolek wyruszają w świat
- Bukolandia
- Bąblandia
- Celebrechty
- Cywilizacja (animated series)
- Czternaście bajek z Królestwa Lailonii Leszka Kołakowskiego
- Dixie (animated series)
- Dwa koty i pies
- Dziwne przygody Koziołka Matołka
- Ferdynand Wspaniały (animated series)
- Kot Filemon
- Film pod strasznym tytułem
- Fortele Jonatana Koota
- Generał Italia
- Gucio i Cezar
- Harry i Toto
- Hip-Hip i Hurra
- Jacek Śpioszek
- Jeż Kleofas
- Kangurek Hip-Hop
- Kapitan Bomba
- Karrypel kontra Groszki
- Kasztaniaki
- Kochajmy straszydła
- Kolorowy świat Pacyka
- Król Maciuś Pierwszy (animated series)
- Kulfon, co z ciebie wyrośnie?
- Leśne skrzaty i kaczorek Feluś
- Lis Leon
- Marceli Szpak dziwi się światu
- Maurycy i Hawranek
- Mały Pingwin Pik-Pok (animated series)
- Mieszkaniec zegara z kurantem
- Między nami bocianami
- Miś Fantazy
- Miś Kudłatek
- Miś Uszatek
- Mordziaki
- Na tropie
- Nasz dziadzio
- Niezły kanał
- O dwóch takich, co ukradli księżyc (animated series)
- Olimpiada Bolka i Lolka
- Opowiadania Muminków
- Pampalini łowca zwierząt
- Parapet (animated series)
- Pies, kot i...
- Piesek Dali
- Piesek w kratkę
- Plastelinki
- Plastusiowy pamiętnik (animated series)
- Pod gradobiciem pytań
- Podróże do bajek
- Podróże kapitana Klipera
- Pomysłowy Dobromir
- Pomysłowy wnuczek
- Porwanie Baltazara Gąbki
- Powrót do Wiklinowej Zatoki
- Proszę słonia
- Przygody Błękitnego Rycerzyka
- Przygody Gapiszona
- Przygody Misia Colargola
- Przygody Myszki
- Przygody skrzatów
- Przygód kilka wróbla Ćwirka
- Przypadki Zwierzo-Jeża
- Przytulaki
- Pucuł i Grzechu
- Reggae Rabbits
- Reksio
- Różne przygody Gąski Balbinki
- Tajemnica szyfru Marabuta
- Tajemnice wiklinowej zatoki
- Troo (animated series)
- Trzy misie (animated series)
- Tydzień przygód w Afryce
- W krainie czarnoksiężnika Oza (animated series)
- Wielka podróż Bolka i Lolka
- Wyprawa Profesora Gąbki
- Wędrówki Pyzy
- Włatcy móch
- Zaczarowany ołówek
- Zima w Wiklinowej Zatoce
- Zwierzaki-cudaki

== Biographical ==
- Generał
- Hrabina Cosel
- Kanclerz
- Kopernik
- Królewskie sny
- Królowa Bona
- Marszałek Piłsudski
- Modrzejewska
- Polska Jasienicy
- Wielka miłość Balzaka
- Święty Augustyn

== Children's ==
- Agi Bagi
- Awantura o Basię
- Bajka o bajkach
- Bajka o trzech smokach
- Bajki Bolka i Lolka
- Bajki Pana Bałagana
- Bajki zza okna
- Banda Rudego Pająka
- Bardzo przygodowe podróże Kulfona
- Baśnie i bajki polskie
- Baśnie i waśnie
- Bolek i Lolek
- Bolek i Lolek na Dzikim Zachodzie
- Bolek i Lolek na wakacjach
- Bolek i Lolek wyruszają w świat
- Czternaście bajek z Królestwa Lailonii Leszka Kołakowskiego
- Dixie
- Do dzwonka
- Do przerwy 0:1
- Dom na głowie
- Dwa koty i pies
- Dwa światy
- Dziwne przygody Koziołka Matołka
- Ferdynand Wspaniały
- Kot Filemon
- Film pod strasznym tytułem
- Fortele Jonatana Koota
- Gniewko, syn rybaka
- Gruby
- Gucio i Cezar
- Gwiezdny Pirat
- Hip-Hip i Hurra
- Jacek i Agatka
- Janka
- Kamienna tajemnica
- Kangurek Hip-Hop
- Klasa na obcasach
- Klementynka i Klemens - gęsi z Doliny Młynów
- Kochajmy straszydła
- Król Maciuś Pierwszy
- Kulfon, co z ciebie wyrośnie?
- Leśne skrzaty i kaczorek Feluś
- Lis Leon
- Magiczne drzewo
- Marceli Szpak dziwi się światu
- Maszyna zmian
- Maszyna zmian. Nowe przygody
- Maurycy i Hawranek
- Mały Pingwin Pik-Pok
- Mieszkaniec zegara z kurantem
- Miś Fantazy
- Miś Kudłatek
- Miś Uszatek
- Molly
- Na tropie
- Nasz dziadzio
- Niewiarygodne przygody Marka Piegusa
- O dwóch takich, co ukradli księżyc
- Oko proroka czyli Hanusz Bystry i jego przygody
- Olimpiada Bolka i Lolka
- Opowiadania Muminków
- Pampalini łowca zwierząt
- Pierścień i róża
- Pies, kot i...
- Piesek Dali
- Piesek w kratkę
- Plastelinki
- Plastusiowy pamiętnik
- Plecak pełen przygód
- Podróż za jeden uśmiech
- Podróże do bajek
- Pomysłowy Dobromir
- Pomysłowy wnuczek
- Porwanie Baltazara Gąbki
- Powrót do Wiklinowej Zatoki
- Proszę słonia
- Przygody Błękitnego Rycerzyka
- Przygody Misia Colargola
- Przygody Myszki
- Przygody psa Cywila Hundeführer_Walczak_–_Die_Geschichte_eines_Polizeihundes
- Przygody skrzatów
- Przygrywka
- Przygód kilka wróbla Ćwirka
- Przypadki Zwierzo-Jeża
- Reksio
- Rozalka Olaboga (miniserial)
- Samochodzik i templariusze
- Siedem stron świata
- Siedem życzeń
- Stawiam na Tolka Banana
- Szaleństwa panny Ewy
- Szaleństwo Majki Skowron
- Szatan z siódmej klasy
- Słoneczna włócznia
- Tajemnica Sagali
- Tajemnica szyfru Marabuta
- Tajemnice wiklinowej zatoki
- Tajna misja
- Trzy szalone zera
- Tydzień przygód w Afryce
- Tylko Kaśka
- Ucieczka-wycieczka
- Urwisy z Doliny Młynów
- W krainie czarnoksiężnika Oza
- W krainie Władcy Smoków
- W piątą stronę świata
- Wakacje z duchami
- WOW
- Wyprawa Profesora Gąbki
- Wędrówki Pyzy
- Z przygodą na ty
- Zaczarowany ołówek
- Zima w Wiklinowej Zatoce
- Znak orła
- Zwierzaki-cudaki
- Żegnaj Rockefeller

== Comedy ==
- 1670
- 39 i pół
- Agentki
- Ale się kręci
- Anioł Stróż
- Badziewiakowie
- Bank nie z tej ziemi
- Bao-Bab, czyli zielono mi
- Bar Atlantic
- Barbara i Jan
- BrzydUla
- Bulionerzy
- Caméra Café
- Całkiem nowe lata miodowe
- Codzienna 2 m. 3
- Czego się boją faceci, czyli seks w mniejszym mieście
- Czterdziestolatek
- Czterdziestolatek. 20 lat później
- Cztery poziomo
- Daleko od noszy
- Do wesela się zagoi
- Duch w dom
- Duża przerwa
- Dziki
- Dziki 2: Pojedynek
- Dziupla Cezara
- Faceci do wzięcia
- Fitness Club
- Garderoba damska
- Generał Italia
- Gosia i Małgosia
- Graczykowie
- Graczykowie, czyli Buła i spóła
- Grzeszni i bogaci
- Halo Hans!
- Hela w opałach
- I kto tu rządzi?
- Ja, Malinowski
- Kaliber 200 volt
- Kapitan Bomba
- Kasia i Tomek
- Klatka B
- Kocham Klarę
- Kosmici
- Król przedmieścia
- Licencja na wychowanie
- Lokatorzy
- Lot 001
- Mamuśki
- Małopole czyli świat
- Miodowe lata
- Myszka Walewska
- Na kłopoty... Bednarski
- Niania
- Niezły kanał
- Okazja
- Palce lizać
- Panienki
- Pod gradobiciem pytań
- Pokój 107
- Pokój na czarno
- Pucuś
- Ranczo
- Reggae Rabbits
- Rodziców nie ma w domu
- Rodzina zastępcza
- Rodzinka
- Rodzinka.pl
- Sex FM
- Siedem stron świata
- Siedem życzeń
- Skarb sekretarza
- Spadkobiercy
- Stacja
- Stacyjka
- Sublokatorzy
- Synowie
- Szpital na perypetiach
- Sąsiedzi
- Talki z resztą
- Tata, a Marcin powiedział
- Trzy po trzy - Numery z kwatery
- Tygrysy Europy
- Tygrysy Europy 2
- U fryzjera
- Wiedźmy
- Wojna domowa
- Z pianką czy bez
- Zakręcone
- Zmiennicy
- Świat według Kiepskich
- Święta wojna

== Crime ==
- 07 zgłoś się
- Akwarium, czyli Samotność szpiega
- Akwen Eldorado
- Barbara i Jan
- Czas honoru
- Czwarta władza
- Defekt
- Ekstradycja
- Fala zbrodni
- Fałszerze - powrót Sfory
- Gorący Temat
- Królowie śródmieścia
- Kruk
- Misja
- N1ckola
- Naznaczony
- Odwróceni
- Oficer
- Oficerowie
- Pakt
- Pitbull
- Podziemny front
- Pogranicze w ogniu
- Powrót doktora von Kniprode
- Prawo miasta
- Przygody psa Cywila
- The Mire (2018) (Rojst) set in 1980's SW Poland.
- S.O.S.
- Sfora
- Szadź
- Tajemnica twierdzy szyfrów
- The Woods (W głębi lasu) 2020 Netflix mystery thriller
- Trzeci oficer
- Trzecia granica
- Twarzą w twarz
- Zaginiona
- Zbrodnia (2014) (The Crime) TV series set in the town of Hel, Poland
- Życie na gorąco
- Żywioły Saszy. Ogień

== Documentary ==
- 18 Wheels Across America
- Alfabet mafii
- Aniołki
- Apetyt na Europę
- Babilon.pl
- Errata do biografii
- Historia Naturalna Polski
- N1ckola
- Polska Jasienicy
- Tańcząca z Gruzją

== Drama ==
- Absolutni debiutanci
- Aby do świtu...
- Adam i Ewa
- Akwarium, czyli Samotność szpiega
- Alternatywy 4
- Apetyt na miłość
- Apetyt na życie
- Ballada o Januszku
- Banda Rudego Pająka
- Bao-Bab, czyli zielono mi
- Barwy szczęścia
- Bez tajemnic
- Biała wizytówka
- Białe tango
- Blisko, coraz bliżej
- Blondynka
- Boża podszewka
- Boża podszewka II
- BrzydUla
- Bulionerzy
- Będziesz moja
- Chichot losu
- Chłopi
- Czterdziestolatek
- Czterdziestolatek. 20 lat później
- Czułość i kłamstwa
- Daleko od szosy
- Dekalog
- Doktor Ewa
- Doktor Murek
- Dom
- Dom nad rozlewiskiem
- Dom niespokojnej starości
- Dorastanie
- Doręczyciel
- Droga
- Dwie strony medalu
- Dyrektorzy
- Egzamin z życia
- Fitness Club
- Gruby
- Głęboka woda
- Hotel 52
- Hotel pod żyrafą i nosorożcem
- Ile jest życia
- Infamia
- Ja wam pokażę!
- Jan Serce
- Janka
- Jest jak jest
- Kariera Nikodema Dyzmy
- Karino
- Klan
- Klinika samotnych serc
- Klub profesora Tutki
- Klub szalonych dziewic
- Kochaj mnie, kochaj!
- Komediantka
- Kopciuszek
- Królowie śródmieścia
- Lalka
- Lato leśnych ludzi
- Licencja na wychowanie
- Linia życia
- Londyńczycy
- M jak miłość
- Magda M.
- Majka
- Marzenia do spełnienia
- Matki, żony i kochanki
- Miasteczko
- Miłość nad rozlewiskiem
- My Baby
- Na dobre i na złe
- Na kocią łapę
- Na Wspólnej
- Nad Niemnem
- Najważniejszy dzień życia
- Noce i dnie
- Ojciec Mateusz
- Palce lizać
- Panny i Wdowy
- Pensjonat pod Różą
- Pierwsza miłość
- Plebania
- Pogoda na piątek
- Polskie drogi
- Popielec
- Prosto w serce
- Przedwiośnie
- Przepis na życie
- Przeprowadzki
- Przystań
- Psie serce
- Radio Romans
- Rajskie klimaty
- Regina
- Rodzina Kanderów
- Rodzina Leśniewskich
- Rodzina Połanieckich
- Rzeka kłamstwa
- Ród Gąsieniców
- Samo Życie
- Siedlisko
- Siostry
- Sprawa na dziś
- Spółka rodzinna
- Stacyjka
- Stawiam na Tolka Banana
- Strachy
- Szpilki na Giewoncie
- Sława i chwała
- Tak czy nie?
- Talki z resztą
- Tancerze
- Lista odcinków serialu Tancerze
- Tango z aniołem
- Teraz albo nigdy!
- Trędowata
- Twarze i maski
- Twarzą w twarz
- Tylko miłość
- Układ krążenia
- Urwisy z Doliny Młynów
- Usta usta
- W labiryncie
- W piątą stronę świata
- W słońcu i w deszczu
- Warto kochać
- Wiedźmy
- Więzy krwi
- Wojna domowa
- Z biegiem lat, z biegiem dni...
- Zaginiona
- Zespół adwokacki
- Znaki szczególne
- Zostać miss
- Zostać miss 2
- Złotopolscy
- Ślad na ziemi
- Życie jak poker
- Życie Kamila Kuranta

== Fantasy ==
- Alchemik Sendivius
- Dwa światy
- Magiczne drzewo
- Maszyna zmian
- Maszyna zmian. Nowe przygody
- Mistrz i Małgorzata
- Pierścień i róża
- Siedem życzeń
- Stara baśń
- Słoneczna włócznia
- Tajemnica Sagali
- Wiedźmin
- WOW

== History ==
- 1920. Wojna i miłość
- Archiwista
- Biała wizytówka
- Blisko, coraz bliżej
- Chłopi
- Crimen
- Czarne chmury
- Czas honoru
- Gazda z Diabelnej
- Gdańsk 39
- Generał
- Gniewko, syn rybaka
- Hrabina Cosel
- Kanclerz
- Komediantka
- Kopernik
- Królewskie sny
- Królowa Bona
- Kuchnia Polska
- Lalka
- Marszałek Piłsudski
- Modrzejewska
- Nad Niemnem
- Najdłuższa wojna nowoczesnej Europy
- Noce i dnie
- Ogniem i mieczem
- Oko proroka czyli Hanusz Bystry i jego przygody
- Polska Jasienicy
- Przedwiośnie
- Przygody pana Michała
- Przyłbice i kaptury
- Quo vadis
- Rodzina Połanieckich
- Rycerze i rabusie
- Rzeka kłamstwa
- Ród Gąsieniców
- Stara baśń
- Syzyfowe prace
- Sława i chwała
- Tajemnica twierdzy szyfrów
- W pustyni i w puszczy
- W pustyni i w puszczy
- Wielka miłość Balzaka
- Wojna i pokój
- Z biegiem lat, z biegiem dni...
- Zaklęty dwór
- Ziemia obiecana
- Znak orła

== Military ==
- 1920. Wojna i miłość
- 1944
- Biała wizytówka
- Czas honoru
- Czterej pancerni i pies
- Do krwi ostatniej
- Kolumbowie
- Podziemny front
- Pogranicze w ogniu
- Polskie drogi
- Popielec
- Powrót doktora von Kniprode
- Sprawiedliwi
- Stawka wieksza niz zycie
- Tajemnica Enigmy
- Tajemnica twierdzy szyfrów
- Trzecia granica
- Wojenna narzeczona
- Wojna i pokój

== Period ==
- Alchemik Sendivius
- Awantura o Basię
- Chłopi
- Crimen
- Czarne chmury
- Gniewko, syn rybaka
- Hrabina Cosel
- Janosik
- Kanclerz
- Komediantka
- Kopernik
- Królewskie sny
- Królowa Bona
- Lalka
- Modrzejewska
- Na kłopoty... Bednarski
- Nad Niemnem
- Noce i dnie
- Ogniem i mieczem
- Oko proroka czyli Hanusz Bystry i jego przygody
- Pierścień i róża
- Przedwiośnie
- Przygody pana Michała
- Przyłbice i kaptury
- Quo vadis
- Rodzina Połanieckich
- Rycerze i rabusie
- Ród Gąsieniców
- Stara baśń
- Strachy
- Syzyfowe prace
- Szaleństwa panny Ewy
- Szatan z siódmej klasy
- Sława i chwała
- Temida
- Trędowata
- W pustyni i w puszczy
- W pustyni i w puszczy
- Wielka miłość Balzaka
- Wojna i pokój
- Z biegiem lat, z biegiem dni...
- Zaklęty dwór
- Ziemia obiecana
- Znak orła
- Święty Augustyn
