= Colargol =

Fictional character

- Les Aventures de Colargol character
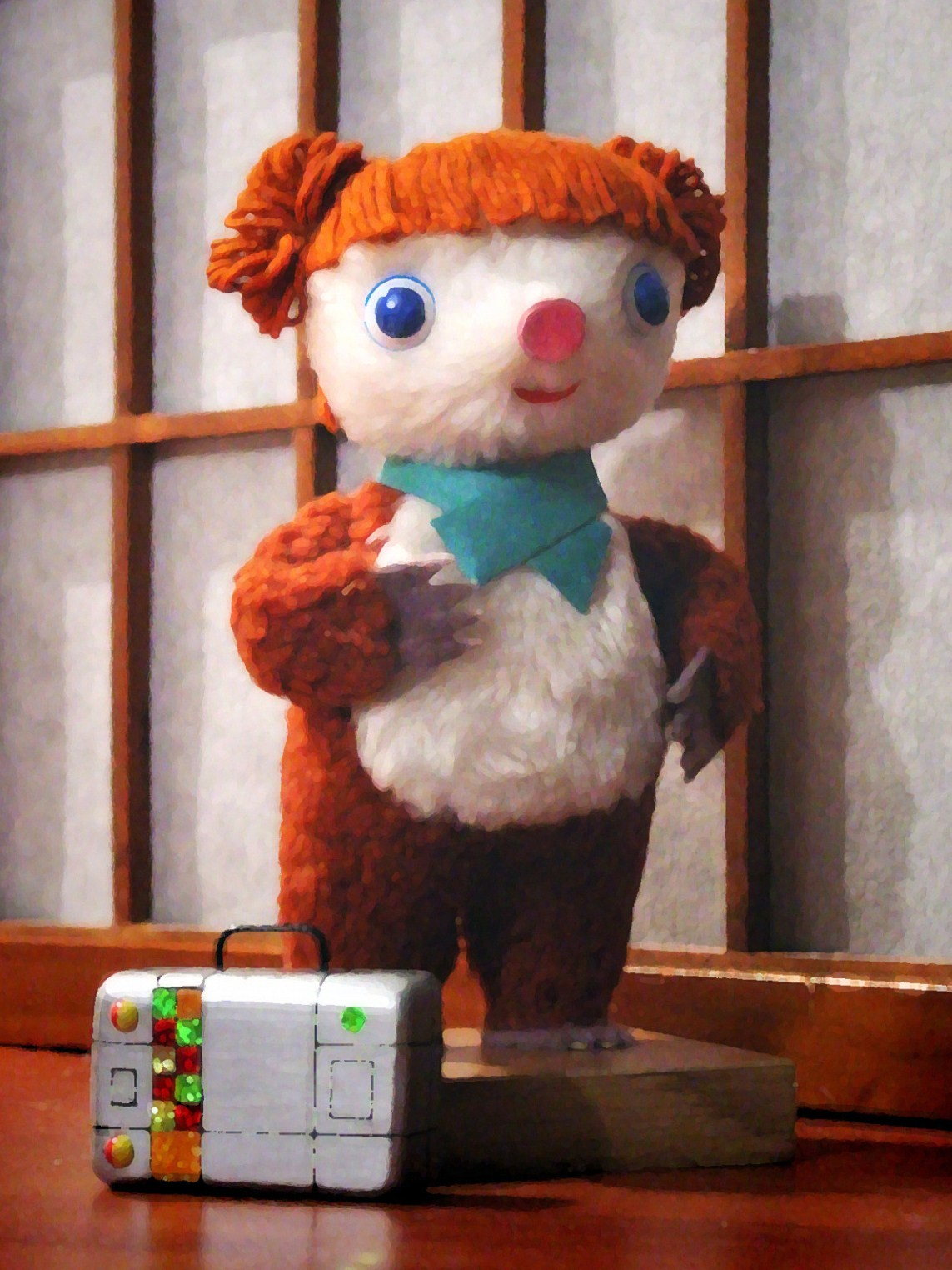
- First appearance: 1967
- Created by: Olga Pouchine

In-universe information
- Species: Bear
- Gender: Male
- Nationality: French

Colargol is a fictional bear created by French writer Olga Pouchine in the 1950s. Colargol first became famous through a series of children's recordings by Philips Records in the 1960s. It is the story of a little bear who wants to sing and travel the world, but lacks the natural ability.

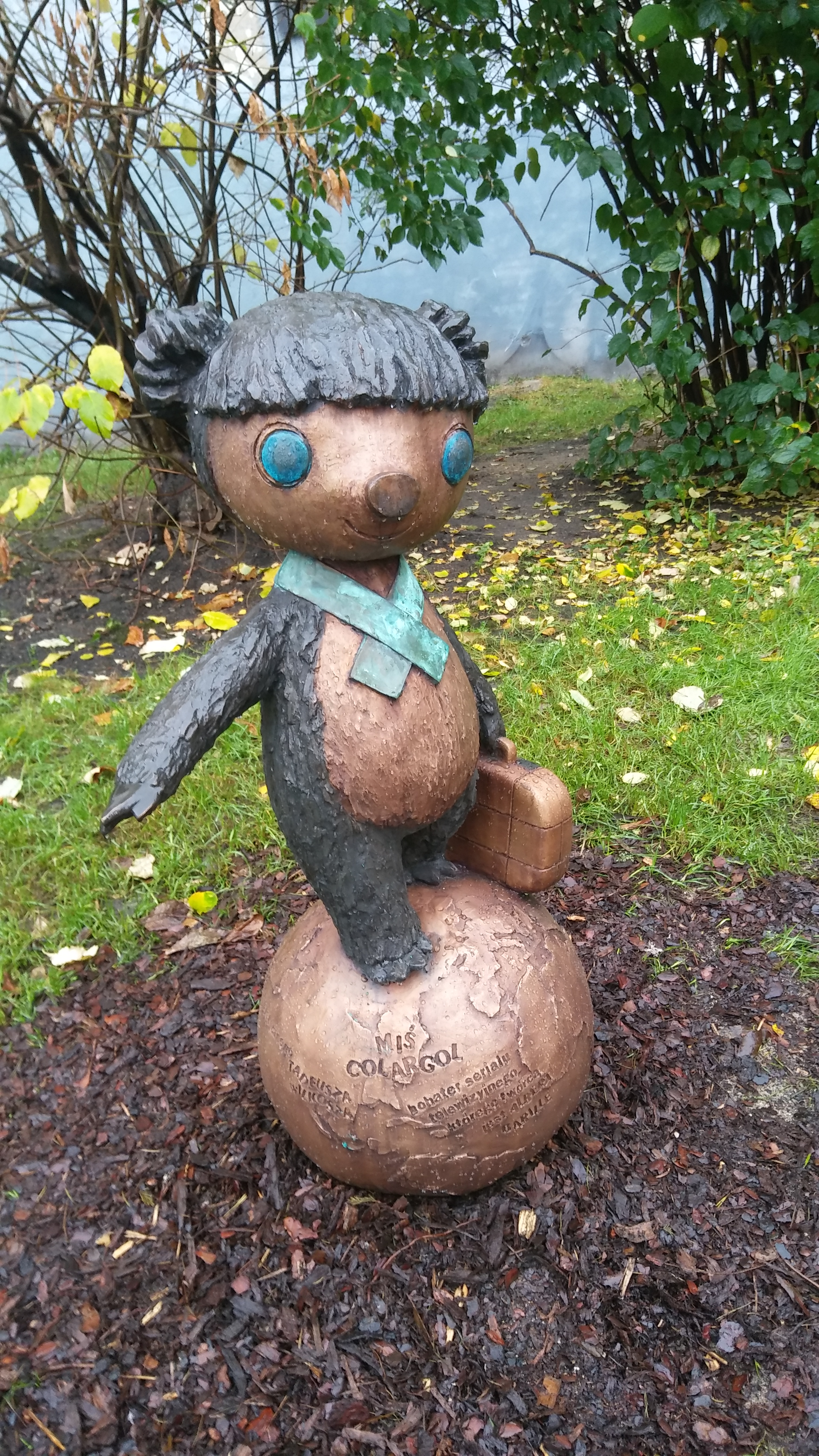
Colargol sculpture in Łódź

== Colargol on television ==
Following the success of the Colargol records, Albert Barillé's animation company Procidis started production on Les Aventures de Colargol, a stop-motion animated series starring Colargol. Barillé enlisted the Polish animator Tadeusz Wilkosz and Se-ma-for in Łódź to create the animation.

Music for the series was performed by Mireille, with orchestration by Jean-Michel Defaye and lyrics by Victor Villien.

The series was produced from 1967 to 1974, comprising 53 thirteen-minute episodes which were broadcast in many European countries. Les Aventures de Colargol was renamed Barnaby when it was dubbed into English and broadcast in the UK by the BBC. The series underwent another name change when a second dubbed version of the series was shown in Canada (and also in the UK and Ireland), this time as Jeremy the Bear.

The series was also turned into three motion picture films in Poland: Colargol na Dzikim Zachodzie (Colargol in the Wild West) in 1976, Colargol zdobywcą kosmosu (Colargol, the Conqueror of Space) in 1978, and Colargol i cudowna walizka (Colargol and the Magic Suitcase) in 1979.

== Colargol's names around the world ==
Colargol is known by the following names in various countries including:

- Afghanistan: کولرگول Colargol
- Albania: Arushi Kolargol
- Arabic: دبدوب الموسيقار
- Canada: Jeremy the bear (English), Colargol (French)
- Chinese: 小熊杰里米
- Finland: Pikku-Nalle
- France: Colargol
- Germany: Teddybär Colargol
- Hungary: Mackó Misi
- Iceland: Oliver bangsi
- Ireland: Jeremy the bear
- Israel: קולרגול (Colargol)
- Italy: Colargol
- Japan: コラル (Koraru)
- Norway: Bjørnen Colargol
- The Netherlands and Belgium (Flanders): Beertje Colargol
- Poland: Miś Colargol
- South Africa: Lollapot
- Spain: El osito Colargol
- Switzerland: Colargol
- UK: Barnaby Bear
- US: Jeremy the bear

== Barnaby ==
Barnaby is the British version of the Colargol animated series. Barnaby was first aired on the programme Watch with Mother in April 1973 on the BBC. The programme also featured the voice talents of Colin Jeavons (who narrated), Charles Collingwood, Gwenllian Owen and Percy Edwards. The English version (Barnaby) was produced by Michael Grafton-Robinson at Q3 London. Thirteen episodes were produced; an episode usually had at least two "Colargol" episodes spliced together. Barnaby was repeated on a number of occasions between 1973 and 1979.

The theme song ran as follows:

Barnaby the Bear's my name, never call me Jack or James,

I will sing my way to fame, Barnaby the Bear's my name.

Birds taught me to sing when they took me to their king

First I had to fly in the sky so high so high so high so high so high, so...

If you want to sing this way, think of what you want to say,

Add a tune and you will see just how easy it can be!

Treacle Pudding, Fish and Chips, Fizzy drinks and Liquorice.

Flowers, rivers, sand and sea, snowflakes and the stars are free.

La la la la la, la la la la la la la.

La la la la la, la la la la la la la la la la la la la, so...

Barnaby the Bear's my name, never call me Jack or James,

I will sing my way to fame, Barnaby the Bear's my name.''

== Barnaby episode list ==
Title
In the Forest
The Bear Visits The King of the Birds and Learns to Sing
The Concert
The Circus
The Rescue
Barnaby Learns to Swim
Ship's Boy
Escape To Nordine
Return To The Forest
The Holiday
Welcome to Nordine
Crow's Wedding
Farewell Nordine

The Circus was included on the VHS Watch With Mother: The Next Generation by the BBC in 1989

== Jeremy the Bear ==
Jeremy the Bear is the Canadian version of Colargol, a TVOntario program which aired in Canada in the 1970s and 1980s. Unlike the Barnaby British version, Jeremy the Bear kept all of the episodes intact and properly in order. Jeremy was also shown in the Republic of Ireland and on a number of ITV regions in the UK, as well as being aired-available in several northern US states with access to Canadian television.

== Legal dispute ==
The distribution rights were initially held by Procidis whilst Victor Villien held the rights for the previously created Colargol recordings (the material used to provide the musical score). Towards the late 1980s and onward, differences in opinions between Procidis and Villien grew to the extent that the dispute went to court. Procidis lost the case and the distribution rights. As various national television networks had licensed the show from Procidis, they subsequently lost the right to broadcast the show.

When the show was made, Se-Ma-For retained the distribution rights for Poland. However, Se-Ma-For was a state-run organization and the changed economic situation caused by the fall of the Eastern Bloc eventually led to its collapse. All the rights for material produced between 1947 and 1999 including the Polish version of Colargol were inherited by the Polish National Filmotheque.

Because of this, there are still some episodes of Colargol available on VHS and DVD in Poland, although as an indirect consequence of the court case, a complete collection has never been published.

== Trivia ==
- In both the original Colargol and Jeremy the Bear, the opening sequence was different for each episode, and the opening theme would vary according to the story arc that the show was in. There were two main tunes for this. However, the ending song tended to be the same for each episode.
- At the beginning of one of the later episodes, where a train is seen leaving, the camera zooms in on a semaphore signal, a play on the name of the company involved, Se-Ma-For.
- Colargol pops up briefly in the opening credits for Once Upon a Time... Man, another animated series from Procidis.
- The Dutch version of the opening theme tune is sampled on "Flat Cold Medina", a mashup by 2manydjs.

== See also ==
- List of French animated television series
