= Piotr Hertel =

Piotr Hertel (19 May 1936 in Łódź, Lodzkie, Poland – 19 November 2010 Łódź, Lodzkie, Poland) was a Polish music composer and pianist. He wrote music mostly for teenagers' films as well as cartoons, including the Mis Uszatek.
