= Józef Skrobiński =

Polish film director and painter

- Born: 26 January 1910; Wólka near Mława, Poland
- Died: 22 January 1979 (aged 68); Łódź
- Occupations: director, painter

Józef Skrobiński (born 26 January 1910 in Wólka near Mława, died 22 January 1979 in Łódź) was a Polish film director and painter.

== Biography ==
Józef Skrobiński was born on 26 January 1910 in Wólka near Mława (now Mława) in Poland. From 1930–1934, he studied mathematics at the Warsaw University and painting in professor W. Witwicki's class. In 1946, he started his work at the Animated Film Studio and then in Education Film Studio. Skrobiński was a specialist in animated films. Starting in 1951, he made his own films as a director. The subjects of his films were astronomy, mathematics, and physics. He also made some films at Studio of Animated Films in Łódź. Skrobiński directed or produced over 40 animated and popular science films or films for schools.

Skrobiński as a painter belonged to the ‘realism school' of paintings. His paintings were presented at national and regional painting exhibitions in Poland and abroad from 1946 to 1979. He was a member of the Association of Polish Artists. In 1979, the city of Łódź recognized him with a lifetime achievement award in painting.
