= Peter & the Wolf (2006 film) =

- Film poster
- Directed by: Suzie Templeton
- Written by: Suzie Templeton; Marianela Maldonado
- Produced by: Alan Dewhurst; Hugh Welchman; Zbigniew Zmudzki; Luc Toutounghi
- Cinematography: Hugh Gordon; Mikołaj Jaroszewicz
- Edited by: Suzie Templeton; Tony Fish
- Music by: Sergei Prokofiev
- Production companies: BreakThru Films; Se-ma-for
- Distributed by: BreakThru Films
- Release date: 23 September 2006
- Running time: 33 minutes
- Countries: Norway; Poland; United Kingdom
- Budget: £2 million

Peter & the Wolf (Polish: Piotruś i wilk) is a stop-motion animated short film written and directed by Suzie Templeton. An international co-production film between Norway, Poland and United Kingdom, it was made in Se-ma-for Studios in Łódź and has been shown in cinemas; the film has no dialogue but sometimes with live musical accompaniment.

The film won the Academy Award for the Best Animated Short Film at the 80th Academy Awards.

== Plot ==
On the edge of the vast forests of Russia, where wolves still roam, lies a little cottage surrounded by a big, high fence. This is where Peter lives with his grumpy grandfather. Peter is an 11-year-old boy who is constantly picked on by the town's people and his grandfather will not let Peter go out into the forest. Peter has a friend, the lovable Duck (a runner duck in this version), with whom he hangs around his grandfather's yard. A bird (a hooded crow in this version) with a broken wing arrives in the yard. Bird is impatient with Peter and signals him to go into the forest. His heart beating fast, Peter tiptoes into the cottage and reaches over his sleeping grandfather and his snoring, overweight tabby cat. Ever so carefully, Peter takes the keys to the gate.

Peter has the time of his life playing in the forest with his friends. He helps the bird to fly, using a balloon and some rope.

Then everyone skates on the frozen lake. Everyone, that is, except the cat. She lunges at the bird to eat him but is so fat that she crashes straight through the ice and into the freezing water. Grandfather awakes and sees that Peter is in the forest. Very worried, he grabs his shotgun and rushes outside. He grabs Peter off the ice, drags him back into the cottage, and locks the fence, angering Peter. But all of a sudden, things got quiet and Peter felt a sense of uncertainty. He looks out through the fence and sees an Eurasian wolf on the edge of the forest. The cat manages to climb up the tree for safety, but the wolf swallows the duck whole. Peter slings a heavy net over his shoulder and climbs up the fence and into the tree. The bird fights with the wolf but ends in a stalemate. Peter falls from the tree and the wolf attacks him. Eventually, after a long and fierce struggle, Peter catches the wolf in the net after it tries to charge at him.

The bird hears two different sets of footsteps. It turns out to be two male hunters (the same hunters that threatened Peter in the town and chucked him in a large wheelie bin) in the distance. The hunters spot the wolf and try to shoot it. However, the bullets miss the wolf and, instead, hit the cat, who then passes out. They quickly flee and Peter and the bird find the cat lying motionless on the floor. All of a sudden, the cat wakes up, petrified when the wolf was nearby and on the verge of killing it, whilst still covered in the net. Peter's grandfather comes out with a shotgun and spots the wolf covered up by the net. He proceeds to shoot it. However, Peter stops him and hatches a plan.

Later at night, Peter's grandfather drives into town with the captured wolf. Peter is standing, triumphant, on top of the wolf's cage. However, the people do not acknowledge Peter's success and his grandfather takes credit for the wolf's capture. The bird's broken wing heals and it is able to fly again. The town bullies arrive and chastise the defenseless wolf with a gun. After looking into the wolf's sad eyes as well as having become disillusioned with both his grandfather and the townspeople for their poor treatment of them both, Peter opens the cage, and the wolf races back into the forest.

The ending is a complete departure from the original, in which the wolf is presumably left caged in the zoo. Throughout the latter parts of the story, the duck can be heard quacking inside the wolf, implying it is still alive.

== Production and distribution ==
Peter & the Wolf was a multinational production. The main producers were UK production company BreakThru Films, and the co-producers were Se-ma-for Studios in Łódź, Poland and Storm Studios, based in Oslo, Norway. Additionally TV UNAM (XHUNAM-TV Mexico) and ArchAngel SA (Switzerland) participated in its production. All of the puppet animation was completed in Łódź with a mainly Polish crew and scenography by Marek Skrobecki. Special effect shots were made at Se-Ma-For Studios in Poland by a team run by VFX Supervisor Kamil and Artur Zicz VFX Coordinator of the show. Later in the process when film delivery was already severely delayed, part of the VFX was also done at Storm Studios in Oslo. Detailed use of car makes including the 1962 GAZ-21 Volga are referenced throughout the film.

The film is based on the story of Peter and the Wolf as set to the music Sergei Prokofiev in 1936. Unlike the usual version of Prokofiev's work, the film has no narrator but relies on music and images to tell the story. A new recording of Prokofiev's music was made to accompany the cinema and television release. The recording was made by the Philharmonia Orchestra and conducted by Mark Stephenson.

The film was made at Se-ma-for Studios in Łódź, Poland, between February and August 2006. Digital post production was done at Storm Studios in Oslo, Norway. The live premiere was held on 29 September 2006 at the Royal Albert Hall in London, accompanied by the Philharmonia Orchestra. Since then the film has toured with both live and recorded accompaniment around Britain (7 October 2006 Bradford Animation Festival, 23 December 2006 Cadogen Hall, London, 17 February 2007 Exeter Animation Festival, Exeter) Hong Kong (HK Cultural Centre Concert Hall) and Australia (Perth International Festival, Australia). The British television premiere was shown on Channel 4 on Christmas Eve 2006 and was accompanied by pre-recorded music performed by the Philharmonia Orchestra.

The film received its North American premiere on 25 July 2007 at the Mann Center for the Performing Arts. This was a live performance accompanied by the Philadelphia Orchestra with an audience of approximately 9,000 people. The film was broadcast in the U.S. on PBS's Great Performances series on 26 March 2008.

In January 2009, the National Youth Orchestra of Ireland presented the film with live orchestral accompaniment to a packed house at the Helix in Dublin. The reaction from the audience was ecstatic.

== Reception ==
Response to Peter & the Wolf was generally positive. Animation Magazine praised it for "the manner in which it works seamlessly in conjunction with the music", while Classic FM Magazine called it "a small masterpiece".

Peter & the Wolf has won several awards, including the Academy Award in 2008 for Best Animated Short Film, a British Animation Award (BAA) in 2008 for Best TV Special, the Grand Prize ('The Annecy Cristal') and the Audience Award at the 2007 Annecy International Animation Festival, the Golden Rose for Performing Arts at the 2007 Rose d'Or Festival, the Pulcinella Award for Best European Programme at the 2007 Cartoons on the Bay Festival in Italy and the Special Prize at the 2007 Krok International Animated Film Festival in Ukraine. It was also nominated for a BAFTA, a Royal Television Society Programme Award and the Cartoon d'or in 2007.
