= The Secret of Sagala =

- Tajemnica Sagali; Das Geheimnis des Sagala
- Country of origin: Poland; Germany
- Original language: Polish
- No. of seasons: 1
- No. of episodes: 14

Original release
- Network: TVP 1
- Release: 1997

The Secret of Sagala (Polish: Tajemnica Sagali; German: Das Geheimnis des Sagala) is a Polish-German television series. The story revolves around two boys, Kuba and Jacek, who find a magic stone. They go on a journey through time to obtain other pieces (collectively the Sagal), using its power to bring back their mother.

== See also ==
- List of Polish television series
- List of German television series
