= Marek Skrobecki =

Polish director of animated films (born 1951)

- Born: Marek Skrobecki; 18 September 1951 (age 74); Kalisz, Poland
- Education: Academy of Fine Arts In Łódź; National Film School in Łódź
- Known for: Director, writer, scenographer
- Notable work: Peter and the Wolf
- Movement: Polish Living Filmmaker
- Awards: m.in. Academy Awards – The Oscars in 2007

Marek Skrobecki (born 1951) is a Polish director of animated films, mainly using classical puppetry techniques. He works with the film studio Se-ma-for in Łódź.

== Biography ==
Skrobecki was born on 18 September 1951 in Kalisz. He graduated from the Academy of Fine Arts In Łódź. In 1990 he finished at the Faculty of Film Animation at National Film School in Łódź.

He received grants from the British Council and worked at Jim Henson's Creature Shop and Aardman Animation in 1992. In 1988, he made his first film Episode. Then he tried to draw cartoons for children's films. However, in 1992 with Se-ma-for cooperation he produced the film D.I.M having created human-size puppets for it. His technique was very innovative in the animation world and was successfully used in the future production, for example in Ichthys.

In 2006 he worked with Suzie Templeton on a Polish-British co-production of Peter and the Wolf, which was awarded the 2007 Oscar for Best Animated Short Film.

He worked with Polish music group Agressiva 69 and directed two of their videos: "Situations" and "Devil Man".

== Filmography ==
- 1988 – Episode – director, writer, visual art
- 1989 – Birthday Cake – director, writer, visual art
- 1991 – Last sandwich – director, writer, visual art
- 1992 – DIM – director, writer, visual art
- 1993 – What We Dream Of episode: “Head in the clouds – director
- 1995 – OM – director, writer, visual art
- 1998 – Marchenbilder (Fable Photos) – director, visual art (visual art concept Ryszard Kaja)
- 2005 – Ichthys – director, scenography
- 2010 – Danny Boy – director, writer
- and production/opening logos, TV interludes and animation advertising (YES YES, Ery GSM, "Saga", "E", "LOT")

== Cooperation ==
- 1993 – Dreams Republic – special effects
- 1993 – Schindler's List (directed by Steven Spielberg) – special effects and scenography elements
- 1994 – Dogs 2 – The Last Blood (directed by Wladyslaw Pasikowski) – graphic design
- 2000 – Bajland (directed by Henry Dederko) – scenography, interior design
- 2000–2001 – Paradise (directed by Andrew Burl) – co director
- 2006 – Peter and the Wolf (directed by Suzie Templeton) – scenography

== Awards ==
- 1988 – Film Episode – Grand Prize "Jantar" in the short film category for his directorial debut at the Youth Film Meetings ( Młodzieżowe Spotkania Filmowe) "The Young and Film" Koszalin
- 1994 – Film D.I.M – jury special award at the International Film Festival of Fantasy, Thriller & Science Fiction in Brussels
- 1994 – Film D.I.M – Award at the International Short Film Festival, Kraków
- 1994 – Film D.I.M – Special Jury Award at the World Festival of Animated Films in Zagreb
- 1994 – Film D.I.M – Award at the International Animated Film Festival in Espinho
- 1999 – Film Fable Photos – Award: Golden Line at the Festival of Animation Films "OFAFA" in Cracow
- 2005 – Film Ichthys – Honorary Diploma at 45 Crakow Film Festival
- 2005 – Film Ichthys – Award for best short documentary film at the Ottawa Animation Film Festival.
- 2005 – Film Ichthys – Brown Jabberwocky Award – Etude-Anima Festival in Crakow
- 2005 - Film Ichthys – Silver Line Award at the Festival of Animation Films "OFAFA" in Kraków
- 2005 – Film Ichthys – Sony Audience Award – Animateka International Animation Festival – Ljubljana – Slovenia
- 2007 – Film Peter and the Wolf – Oscar for Best Animated Short
- 2010 – Film Danny Boy – The Taurus Studio Award and H. R. Giger Award "Narcisse" for Best Swiss Short- Neuchâtel International Fantastic Film Festival, Switzerland
