= Siedem życzeń =

Polish TV comedy series

- Genre: Fantasy
- Written by: Andrzej Kotkowski; Maciej Zembaty
- Directed by: Janusz Dymek
- Starring: Daniel Kozakiewicz; Maciej Zembaty (voice); Izabella Olejnik; Witold Dębicki
- Country of origin: Poland
- Original language: Polish
- No. of seasons: 1
- No. of episodes: 7

Production
- Running time: 46–64 min.

Original release
- Network: TP1

Siedem życzeń (transl. Seven Wishes) is a 1980s Polish teen fantasy TV series with elements of comedy and adventure.

== Background ==
The series was written by Andrzej Kotkowski and Maciej Zembaty, and directed by Janusz Dymek. It stars Daniel Kozakiewicz, Izabella Olejnik and Witold Dębicki in main roles. One of the characters is also a black cat which was actually played by three different cats, and had its voice dubbed by Zembaty. Polish rock band Wanda i Banda appeared as themselves in two episodes and recorded nine songs for the series, including the title track "Siedem życzeń", which became a hit. Music was composed by John Porter who also performed a cameo in one episode.

The series was largely filmed on location in Warsaw, on housing estates in Gocław and Bemowo. Most scenes of the sixth episode were filmed in Varna, Bulgaria. Although the series was produced in 1984, end credits incorrectly show 1983. Siedem życzeń was then withheld for two years due to censorship, and eventually premiered on Polish television in 1986.

In November 2008, Siedem życzeń was released on DVD. Wanda i Banda released an album with all songs from the series in November 2009. The tracks were re-recorded as the original material couldn't be traced due to convoluted copyrights.

== Plot ==
The story's main character is a 13-year-old boy named Darek living in Warsaw. One day, he rescues a black cat from a group of violent youths on his housing estate. It turns out that the cat can actually speak and introduces himself as Rademenes. Grateful for being saved, the cat offers to make Darek's seven wishes come true, one wish each Wednesday, and one for each episode. At first, the boy doesn't realize the power of the cat's gift and his wishes are selfish and superficial. Rademenes quickly becomes Darek's friend and enjoys granting his wishes. He cheers the boy up in hard times, and he in turn takes good care of the pet, keeping his supernatural abilities a secret from everyone. In episode 6, it turns out that the cat used to live as a human in ancient Egypt, and was punished to reincarnating as a cat for millennia because he had revealed the heliocentric theory and explained the effects of solar and lunar eclipses to the people. In the final episode, Darek's last wish is for Rademenes to turn back into a human. The cat vanishes, but then reappears as a man named Senemedar (Rademenes spelled backwards) who happens to be a co-worker of Darek's father.

== Cast ==
- Daniel Kozakiewicz as Darek Tarkowski
- Maciej Zembaty as Rademenes (voice)
- Izabella Olejnik as Joanna Tarkowska, Darek's mother
- Witold Dębicki as Witold Tarkowski, Darek's father
- Zbigniew Buczkowski as Alfred Rosolak
- Jacek Romańczuk as Jacek Retman, Darek's friend
- Bronisław Pawlik as Kazimierz Michalewicz, school director and geography teacher
- Renata Berger as Małgorzata Szukalska, mathematics teacher
- Artur Barciś as Bolesław Luba, Polish teacher
- Konrad Morawski as biology teacher
- Lech Łotocki as history teacher
- Helena Kowalczykowa as school cloakroom assistant
- Wanda Kwietniewska as herself
- Jacek Domański as Mr Tatarczyk
- Ryszard Bacciarelli as Jacek's father
- Katarzyna Bromirska as Kama
- Roman Bartosiewicz as Senemedar
- Krystyna Borowicz as doctor
- Krzysztof Janczak as thief

== List of episodes ==
1. "Rademenes"
2. "Spojrzenie faraona"
3. "Być dorosłym"
4. "Dużo szczęścia i słodyczy"
5. "Magiczny pierścień"
6. "Klątwa bogini Bast"
7. "Senemedar"
