= Czesław Janczarski =

Polish writer (1911–1971)

Czeslaw Janczarski
- Born: 2 September 1911; Hruszwica, Volhynian Governorate, Russian Empire
- Died: 19 May 1971 (aged 59); Warsaw, Poland
- Education: Warsaw University
- Occupation: Writer
- Writing career
- Genre: Children's literature
- Notable work: Miś Uszatek

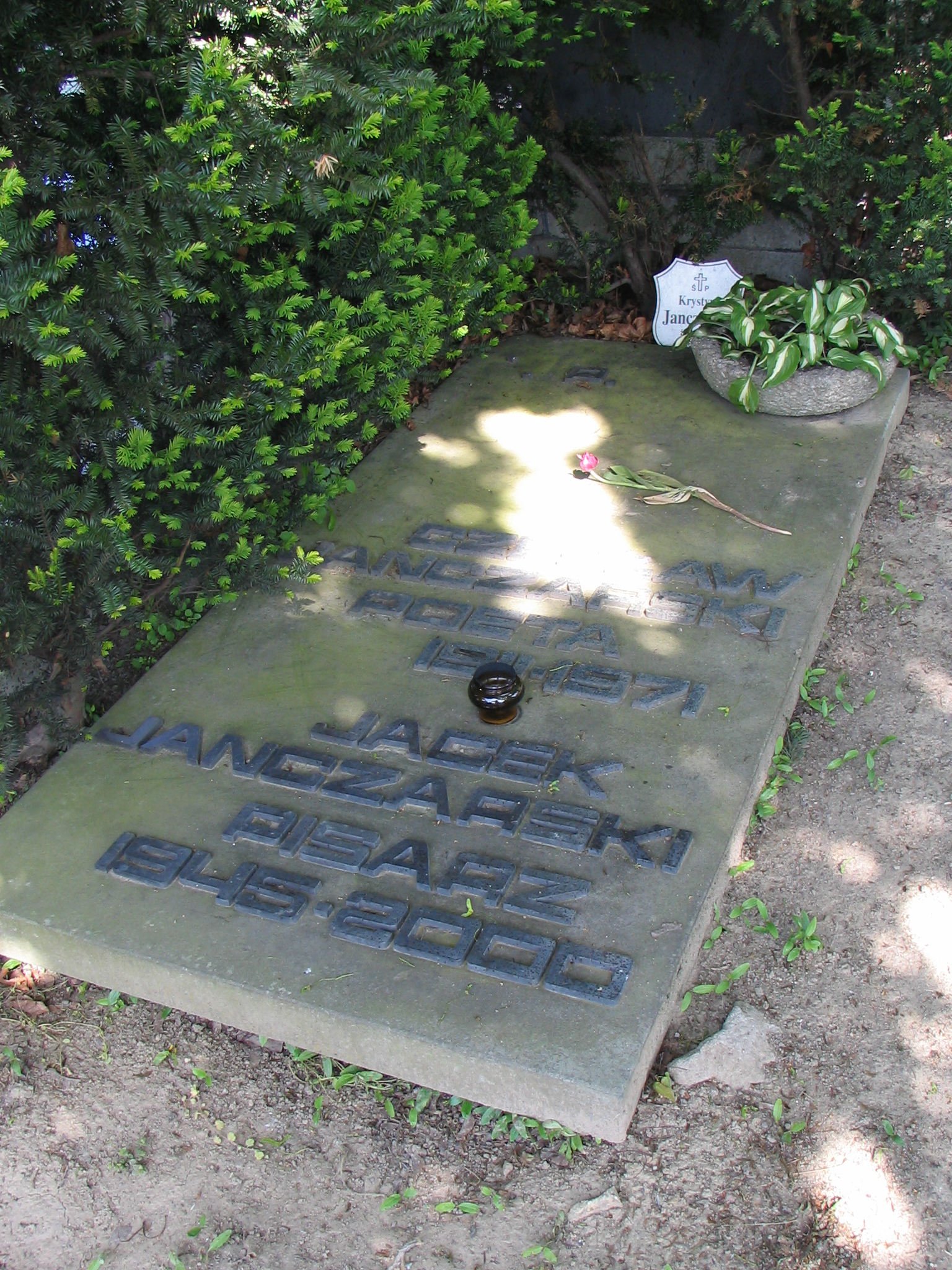
Grave of Czesław Janczarski and his son Jacek at Powązki Cemetery in Warsaw

Czeslaw Janczarski (2 September 1911 – 19 May 1971) was a Polish writer of children's books as well as a translator from the Russian language.

Janczarski was born in the village of Hruszwica, Russian Empire. In 1932 he began studies at Jan Kazimierz University in Lwów (now Lviv, Ukraine). Two years later he moved to the Warsaw University, where he studied Polish Philology. There, he got in touch with Józef Czechowicz and other poets. Janczarski spent World War II in Lwów, between 1944 and 1946 he lived in Kurów and taught in a school in the area of Lublin, then returned to Warsaw. In the late 1940s, he started working for illustrated magazines for kids, such as Iskierki, Płomyczek and Świerszczyk, also cooperated with the Polish Radio.

Janczarski was the creator of kids' biweekly Mis (1957), and for many years he was editor in chief of the publication. Also, he is the creator of Miś Uszatek, one of the most popular characters among Polish children. Janczarski wrote several books and helped create several animated movies about Uszatek's adventures, they were illustrated by Zbigniew Rychlicki.

He died unexpectedly, during a meeting with children in Siedlce he had a heart attack, and died in a hospital in Warsaw a few days later. Janczarski, author of many books for children was awarded with several orders.
