= Mława =

Town in Masovian Voivodeship, Poland

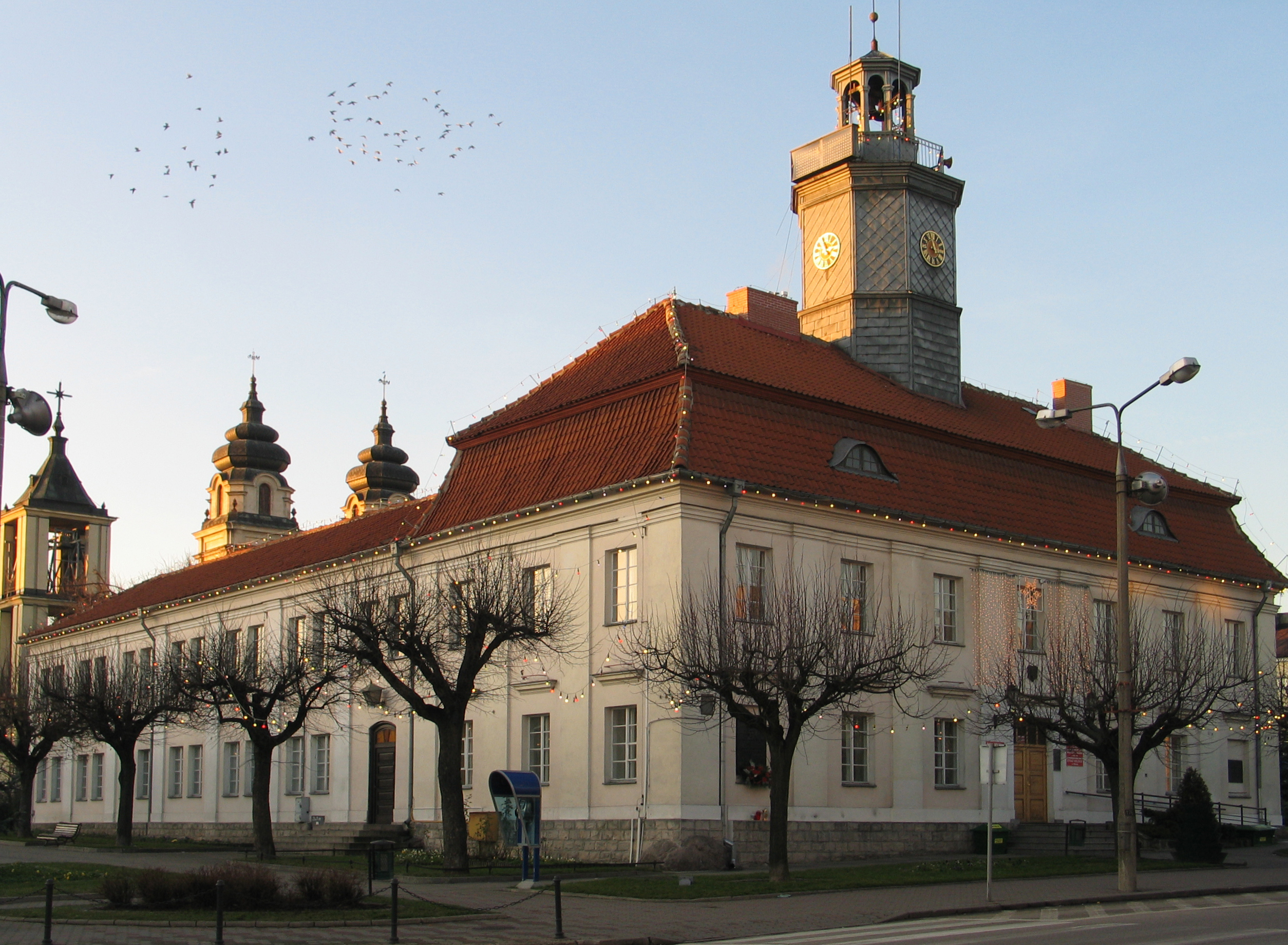
- Baroque Town Hall

- Flag Coat of arms

- Location within Poland
- Coordinates: 53°07′N 20°22′E
- Country: Poland
- Voivodeship: Masovian
- County: Mława
- Gmina: Mława (urban gmina)
- First mentioned: 1426
- Town rights: 1429

Government
  - Mayor: Piotr Jankowski

Area
  - Total: 34.8 km^{2} (13.4 sq mi)
- Highest elevation: 180 m (590 ft)
- Lowest elevation: 135 m (443 ft)

Population (2021)
  - Total: 31,047
  - Density: 892/km^{2} (2,310/sq mi)
- Time zone: UTC+1 (CET)
  - Summer (DST): UTC+2 (CEST)
- Postal code: 06-500 to 06-501
- Area code: +48 023
- Car plates: WML
- Climate: Dfb
- Website: www.mlawa.pl

Mława ([ˈmwava]) (Note: Yiddish: מלאווע Mlave) is a town in north-central Poland with 30,403 inhabitants in 2020. It is the capital of Mława County in the Masovian Voivodeship.

Founded in the Middle Ages, Mława is a former royal town of Poland. It features preserved Baroque and Art Nouveau architecture. It is the largest town of Zawkrze, a small historic subregion of Masovia, and as such it hosts the Museum of Zawkrze Land, devoted to the history and nature of the region. During the German invasion of Poland in 1939, the battle of Mława was fought to the north of the town.

Mława is located on the major Warsaw–Gdańsk railway, and is a local industrial center with a notable LG factory.

== History ==
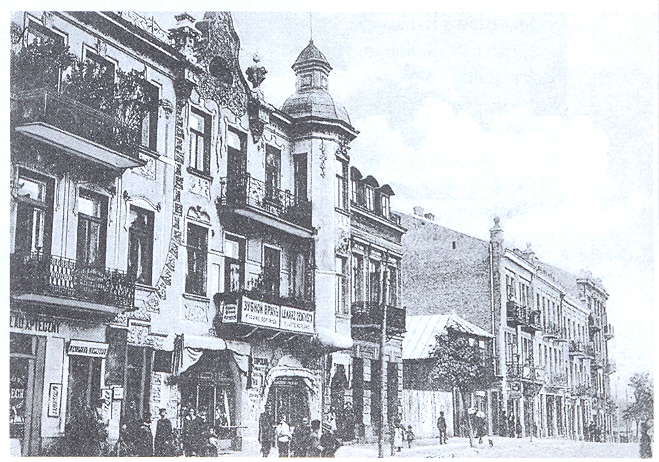
Mława in the early 20th century

Ancient Roman coins – denarii of Marcus Servilius Pulex Geminus, Hadrian, Antoninus Pius and Marcus Aurelius and an antoninianus of Aurelian – have been found in Mława.

The first mention of Mława comes from July 2, 1426, when three princes of Mazovia - Siemowit V, Trojden II and Władysław I came here to a session of a local court. It is not known if Mława had already been an urban center, as there are no sources which would prove it. Three years later, Mława was incorporated as a town It was a royal town and county seat, located in the Płock Voivodeship in the Greater Poland Province. In 1521 during the Polish-Teutonic War, the town was captured and looted by the Teutonic Knights. In 1659 the town was burned by the Swedish troops, and in 1795, following the Third Partition of Poland, Mława became part of the Kingdom of Prussia.

In 1807 it was included in the short-lived Polish Duchy of Warsaw. After Napoleonic Wars, in the 1815 Congress of Vienna Mława (along with the entire province) was incorporated into the Russian Partition of Poland, as part of the initially autonomous Congress Poland. During the January Uprising, on February 20, 1864, it was the site of a clash between Polish insurgents and Russian troops. Since the town was located along the pre-1914 imperial Russian-German border, Mława was a place of heavy fighting between the two opposing armies during World War I, and was occupied by Germany.

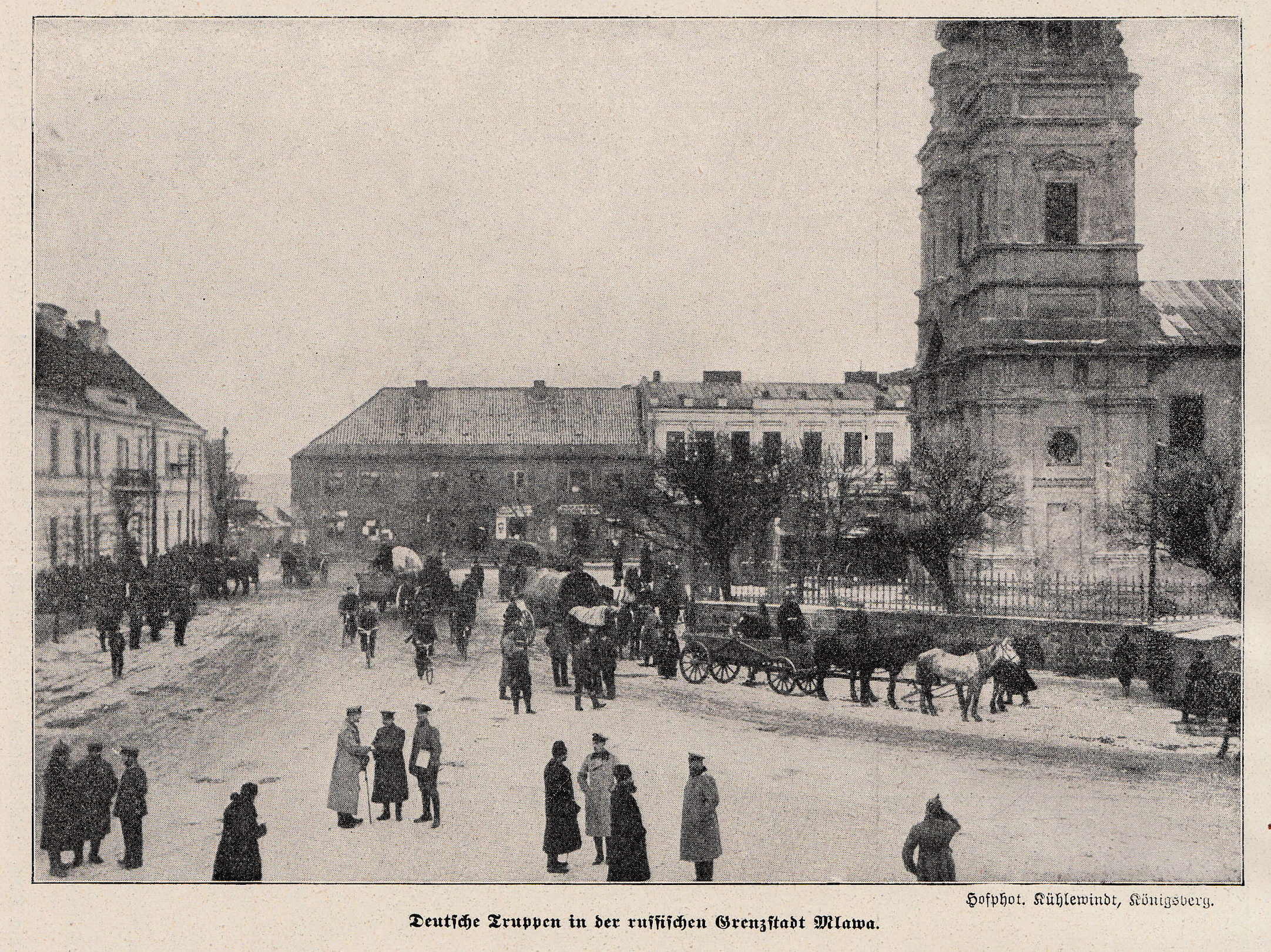
Town square in Mława under German occupation during World War I

After the war, in 1918, Poland regained independence and the town was reintegrated with Poland. During the Polish-Soviet War, it was fiercely defended by Poles on August 9–10, 1920, captured by Russians on August 10, and afterwards recaptured by Poles. Within interwar Poland, the town was assigned to the Warsaw Voivodeship (1919–39). The government of the Second Polish Republic constructed several fortifications there due to proximity of the German border.

In the opening stages of World War II, the advancing German army faced strong resistance from the Polish Army in the battle of Mława otherwise known as the Defence of the Mława between September 1 and September 3, 1939. The Einsatzgruppe V entered the town on September 10, 1939, and carried out first mass arrests among local Poles, who were afterwards imprisoned in the local prison. Also on September 10, the Germans expelled 69 Jews from the town. The Germans carried out mass searches of Polish offices, courthouses and organizations, and mass arrests of local Polish intelligentsia, including local officials, teachers and priests, as part of the Intelligenzaktion, continued in the following months, many were afterwards murdered in the Soldau concentration camp. Local disabled people were murdered in Ościsłowo, on February 20, 1940. Shortly after the beginning of the occupation of Poland, Mława was annexed to Nazi Germany on 26 October 1939 and administered as part of Regierungsbezirk Zichenau. The Germans established and operated two forced labour camps in the town.

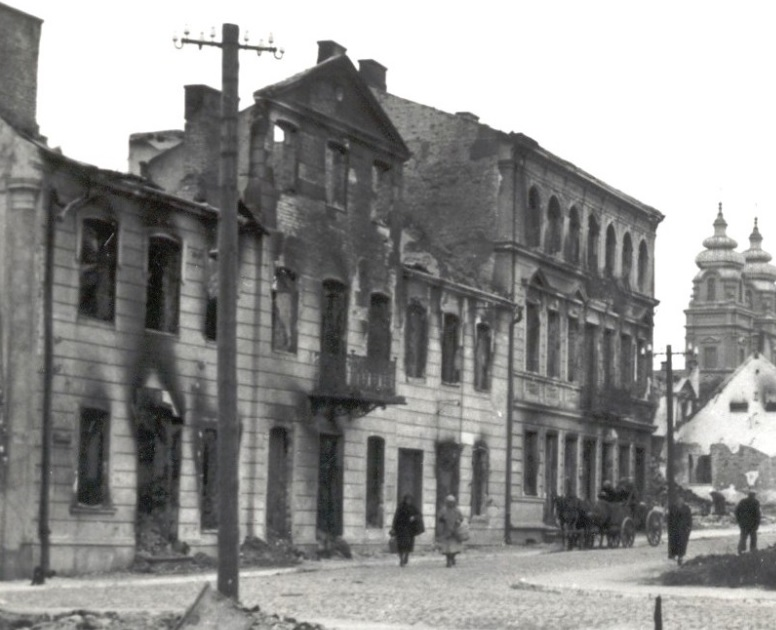
Historic townhouses destroyed during the invasion of Poland in 1939 and dismantled by the Germans in 1940

The town (known as Mielau in German) gave its name to the Truppenübungsplatz "Mielau" military training range built by prisoners of the Soldau concentration camp nearby and nicknamed the New Berlin. The facility was used by the Nazis for repairing and refitting army tanks in Operation Barbarossa, and for testing anti-tank weapons and artillery on an area of 300 square kilometres (120 sq mi). Some fifteen villages around Krzywonoś were completely dismantled to make room for it and 25,000 people were expelled in the area. Similar Nazi German military ranges in occupied Poland included the SS-Truppenübungsplatz Heidelager located in Pustków and the SS-Truppenübungsplatz Westpreußen located in Dziemiany.

Jews who had survived the ghetto were liquidated to Auschwitz. The last deportation was on December 10, 1942.

Prior to the arrival of the Soviets in 1945, Mława was the location of the German massacre of 364 prisoners of the forced labour camp adjacent to the Truppenübungsplatz "Mielau". In 1945 the town was restored to Poland, although with a Soviet-installed communist regime, which remained in power until the Fall of Communism in the 1980s. From 1975 to 1998, it was administratively located in the Ciechanów Voivodeship.

In 1991, between 26 and 27 June, the town saw the a series of violent devastations and looting incidents when a group of youth estimated at 200 individuals, including young females, invaded the homes of the local Roma residents causing them to flee. Not a single Roma person was injured in the riot, but the material losses were substantial affecting up to 40% of residences. Many perpetrators were arrested on-site; a number of them sentenced to jail after a trial. The violence was described as motivated by racism and jealousy. The incident that triggered the riot was the killing of a Polish pedestrian struck along with his companion in a hit-and-run by a Romani male driver. The event triggered major discussions around the status of the Romani people in Poland, economic disparity, and the direction of the ongoing transitional political, social and economic reforms as the country adjusts after the end of the PRL era.

== Climate ==
Mława has an oceanic climate (Köppen climate classification: Cfb) using the −3 °C (27 °F) isotherm or a humid continental climate (Köppen climate classification: Dfb) using the 0 °C (32 °F) isotherm.

Climate data for Mława (1991–2020 normals, extremes 1961–present)
Month	Jan	Feb	Mar	Apr	May	Jun	Jul	Aug	Sep	Oct	Nov	Dec	Year
Record high °C (°F)	11.2 (52.2)	15.7 (60.3)	22.3 (72.1)	28.8 (83.8)	31.3 (88.3)	34.1 (93.4)	36.6 (97.9)	35.9 (96.6)	34.7 (94.5)	25.6 (78.1)	17.6 (63.7)	14.9 (58.8)	36.6 (97.9)
Mean daily maximum °C (°F)	0.1 (32.2)	1.6 (34.9)	6.3 (43.3)	13.7 (56.7)	19.0 (66.2)	22.1 (71.8)	24.4 (75.9)	24.1 (75.4)	18.5 (65.3)	12.1 (53.8)	5.6 (42.1)	1.5 (34.7)	12.4 (54.3)
Daily mean °C (°F)	−2.3 (27.9)	−1.2 (29.8)	2.3 (36.1)	8.4 (47.1)	13.4 (56.1)	16.6 (61.9)	18.7 (65.7)	18.3 (64.9)	13.4 (56.1)	8.0 (46.4)	3.1 (37.6)	−0.7 (30.7)	8.2 (46.8)
Mean daily minimum °C (°F)	−4.7 (23.5)	−3.9 (25.0)	−1.2 (29.8)	3.4 (38.1)	7.9 (46.2)	11.2 (52.2)	13.4 (56.1)	13.0 (55.4)	8.8 (47.8)	4.6 (40.3)	1.0 (33.8)	−2.9 (26.8)	4.2 (39.6)
Record low °C (°F)	−31.2 (−24.2)	−27.2 (−17.0)	−21.9 (−7.4)	−6.5 (20.3)	−5.0 (23.0)	0.5 (32.9)	3.7 (38.7)	3.0 (37.4)	−3.3 (26.1)	−8.8 (16.2)	−19.1 (−2.4)	−26.8 (−16.2)	−31.2 (−24.2)
Average precipitation mm (inches)	35.0 (1.38)	29.4 (1.16)	32.0 (1.26)	32.6 (1.28)	56.7 (2.23)	67.6 (2.66)	75.6 (2.98)	56.9 (2.24)	55.1 (2.17)	43.6 (1.72)	37.9 (1.49)	39.4 (1.55)	561.9 (22.12)
Average extreme snow depth cm (inches)	8.5 (3.3)	8.0 (3.1)	4.7 (1.9)	0.8 (0.3)	0.1 (0.0)	0.0 (0.0)	0.0 (0.0)	0.0 (0.0)	0.0 (0.0)	0.1 (0.0)	1.8 (0.7)	4.9 (1.9)	8.5 (3.3)
Average precipitation days (≥ 0.1 mm)	17.60	14.90	13.57	11.87	12.90	13.03	13.40	13.10	11.67	13.17	15.33	17.33	167.87
Average snowy days (≥ 0 cm)	18.4	16.4	7.7	0.8	0.0	0.0	0.0	0.0	0.0	0.1	3.6	11.5	58.5
Average relative humidity (%)	90.1	86.9	79.3	69.4	70.0	72.0	73.0	72.9	79.7	85.5	91.5	92.0	80.2
Mean monthly sunshine hours	38.7	58.7	118.2	183.5	241.8	234.8	238.7	227.9	151.6	96.0	36.1	26.9	1,652.9
Source 1: Institute of Meteorology and Water Management
Source 2: Meteomodel.pl (records, relative humidity 1991–2020)

== Main sights ==
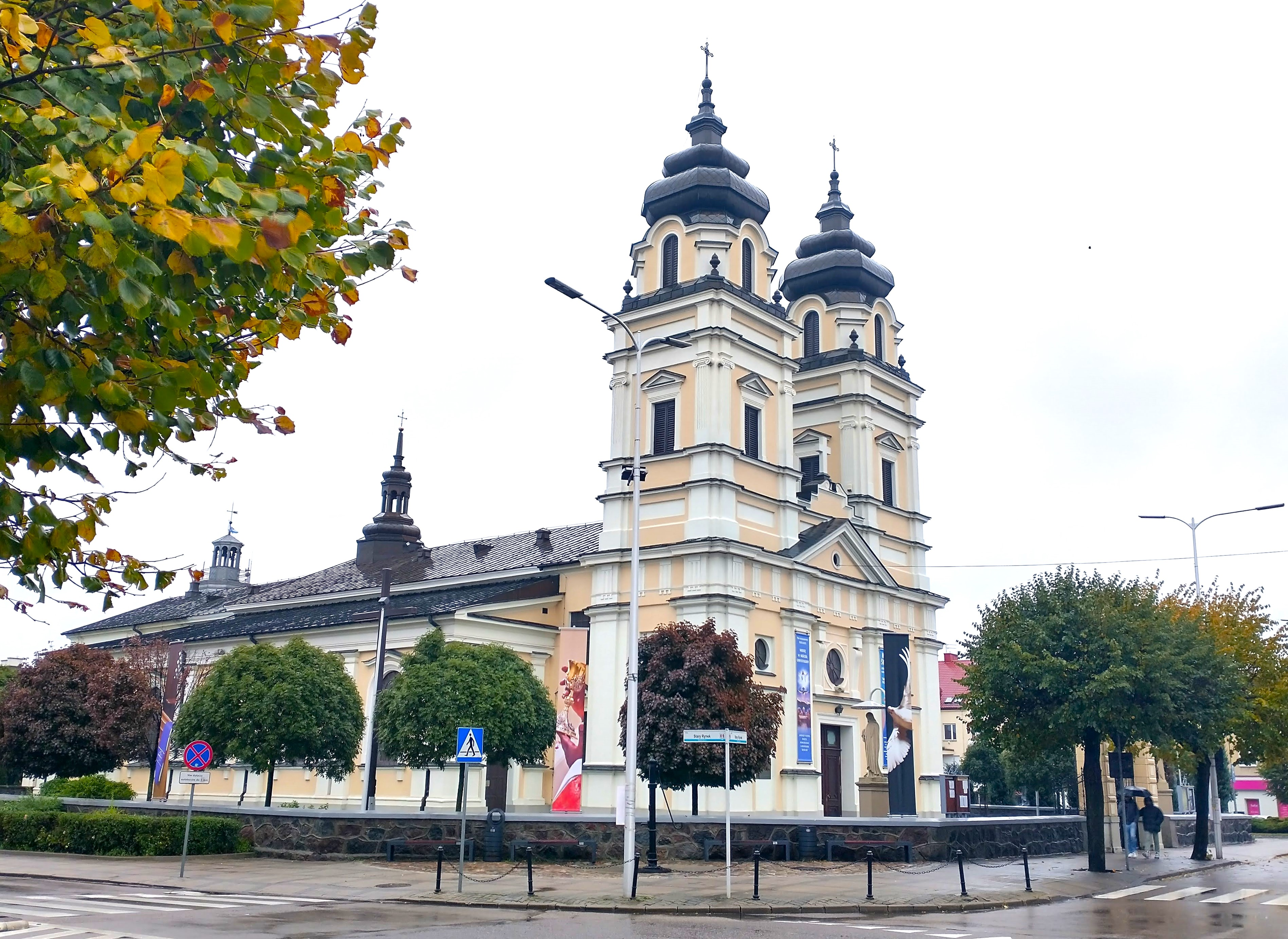
Holy Trinity Church

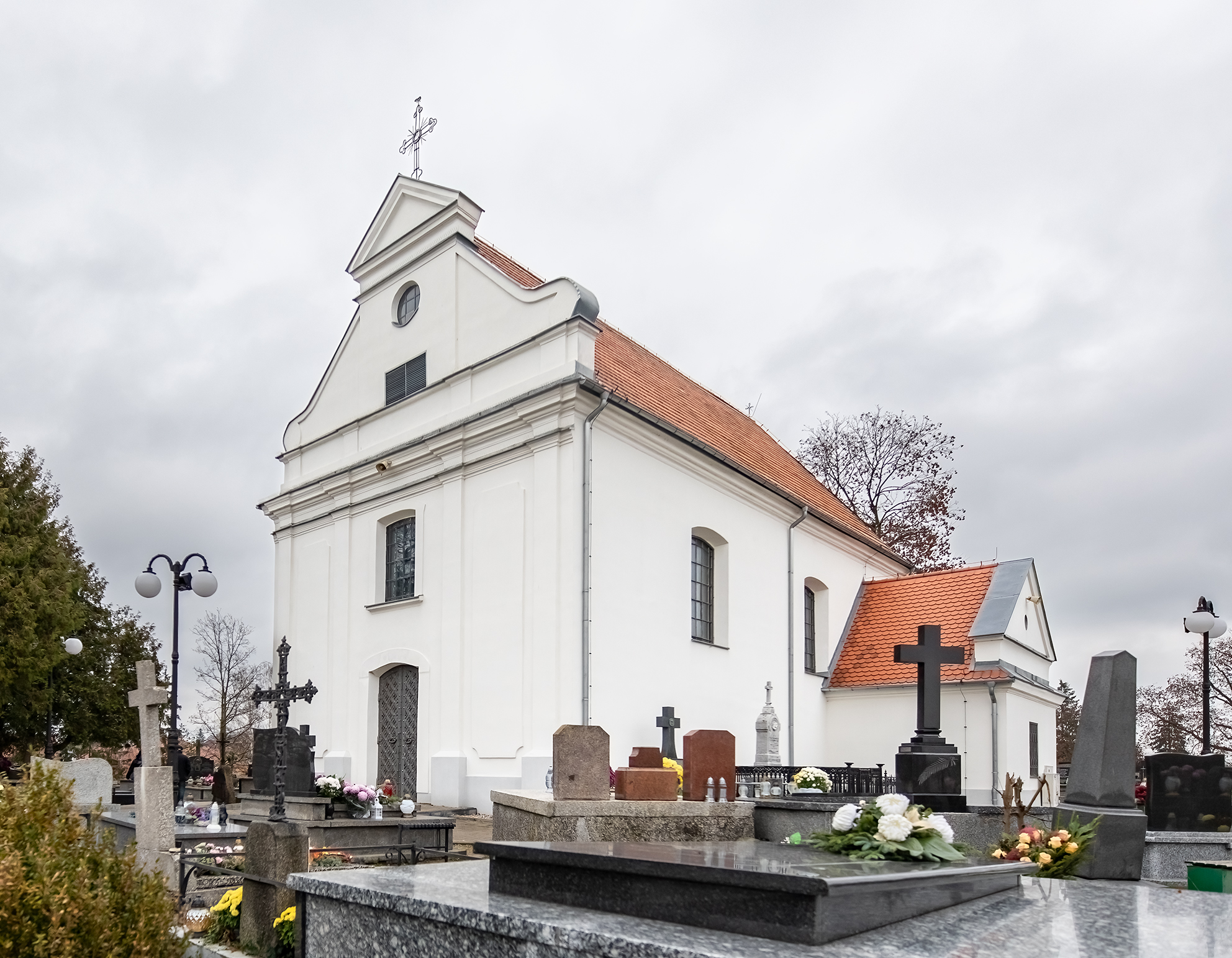
Saint Lawrence church

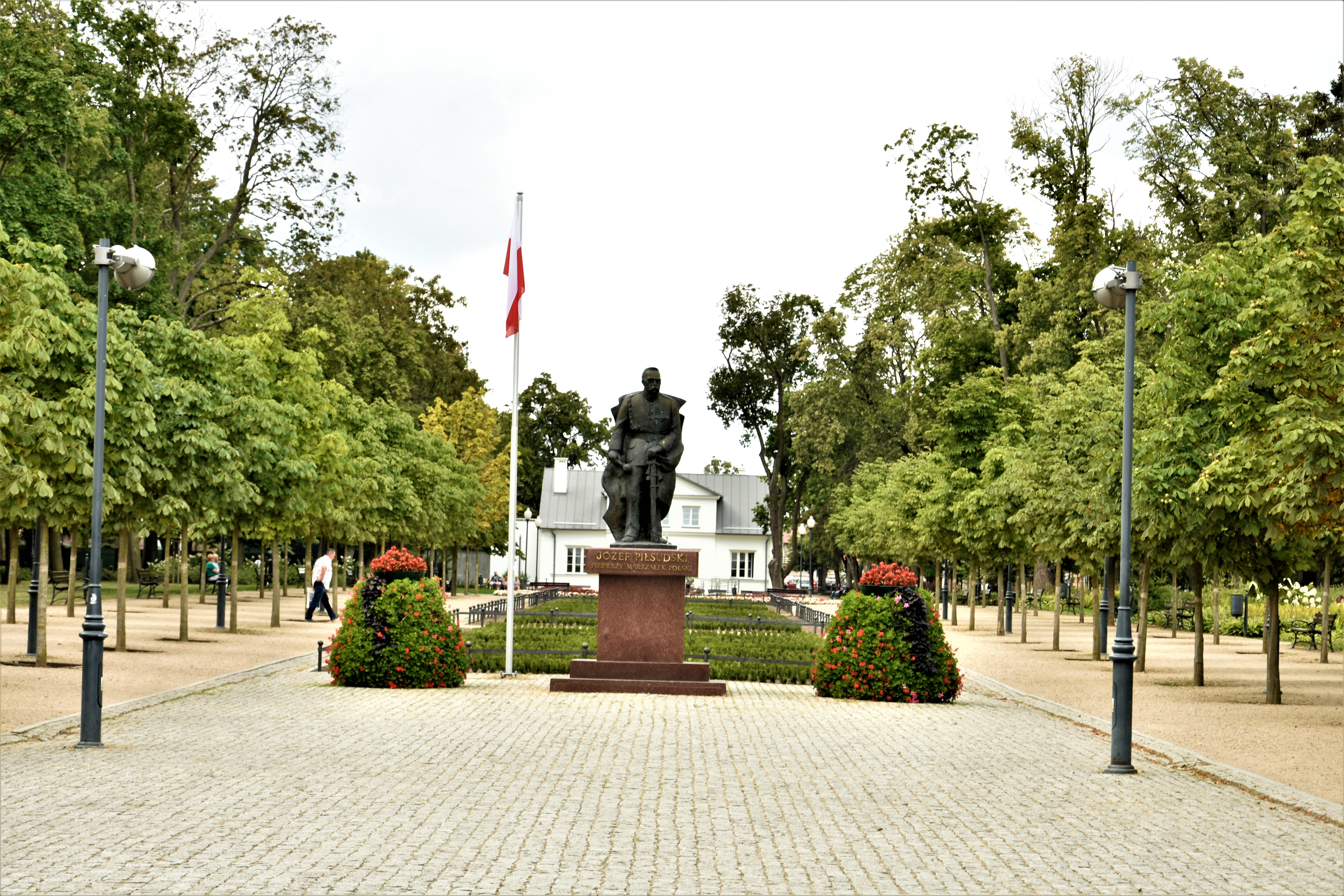
Józef Piłsudski Park

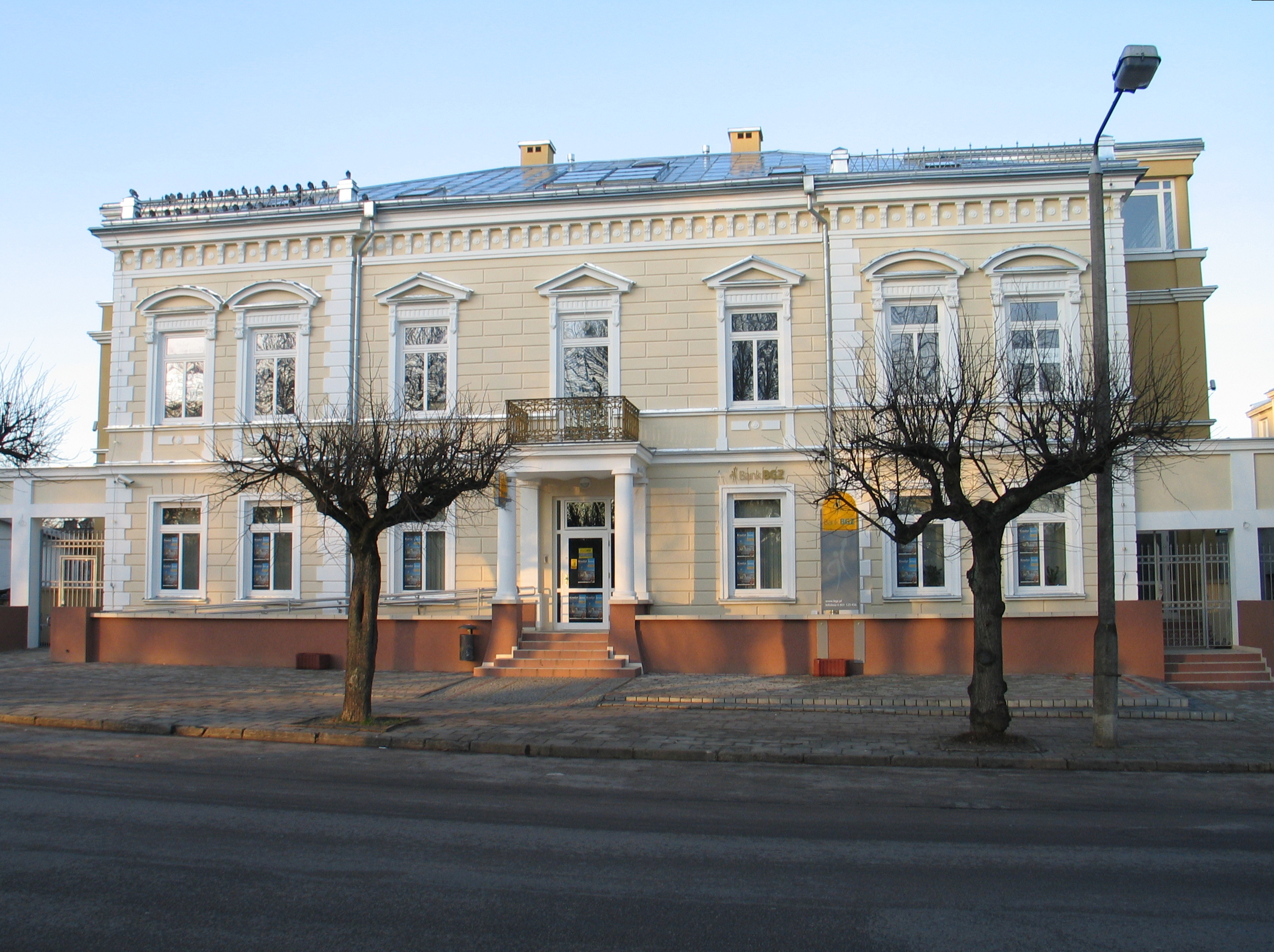
Old bank building

Among the historic sights of Mława are the Baroque town hall, Gothic-Baroque Revival Holy Trinity Church, the Józef Piłsudski Park, Baroque Saint Lawrence Church and many Art Nouveau townhouses

== Industry ==
There is a large LG factory manufacturing TV sets and monitors located in the city. Mława was the first site of deployment for CONVAERO Polska's Bio-Dry™ technology project, where an annual throughput of 96,000 tonnes of MSW shredded is processed to achieve a 25% reduction in moisture and results in an easily separated and recycled end material

== Sport ==
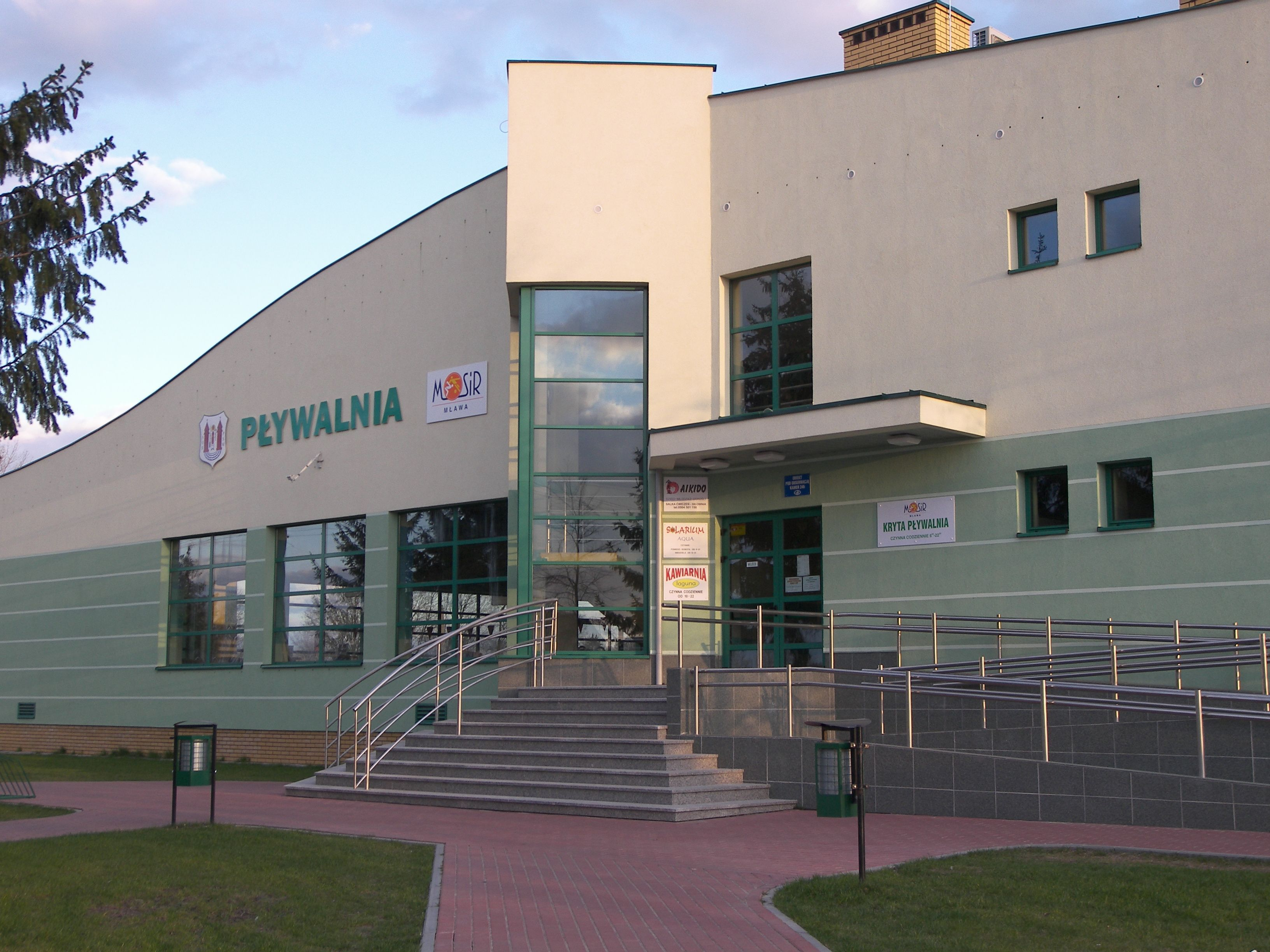
Swimming pool in Mława

Mława is home to Mławianka Mława, a men's football team, which played on the second tier in the 2004–2005 season.

== International relations ==
Mława is twinned with:

- Moscufo, Italy
- Năsăud, Romania
- Saverne, France
- Barañáin, Spain
- Viernheim, Germany
- Raseiniai, Lithuania
- Franconville, France

== People ==
- Victor Alter (1890–1943), socialist activist
- Tekla Bądarzewska (1829–1861), composer and pianist
- Hanna Rudzka-Cybisowa (1897–1988), artist and teacher
- Eva Kotchever (1891–1943), feminist writer, was born in Mława
- Joseph Opatoshu (1886–1954), Yiddish novelist and short story writer
- Grzegorz Skawiński (born 1954), pop-rock musician, guitarist, singer, composer and record producer
- Józef Skrobiński (1910–1979), film director and painter
- Iwona Sobotka (born 1981), opera singer and Grand Prix Winner of the Queen Elizabeth Music Competition
- Józef Unszlicht (1879–1938), revolutionary activist, co-founder of the Cheka

== See also ==
- Bolesław Prus' novel, Pharaoh, partly inspired by 19 August 1887 solar eclipse viewed at Mława
- Vistula River Railroad
