= Storm Studios =

Norwegian visual effects company

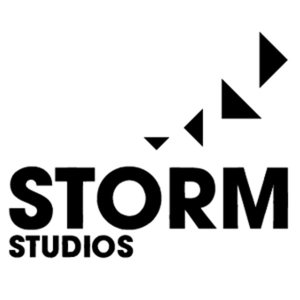
- Industry: Visual effects
- Founded: November 1, 2001
- Headquarters: Oslo, Norway
- Key people: Thomas Reppen
- Website: https://www.stormstudios.no

Storm Studios AS is a Norwegian visual effects and computer animation studio based in Oslo known for their work in film, television and advertising.

== Productions ==
- Disclosure Day (2026)
- Daredevil: Born Again (2026)
- Star Trek: Starfleet Academy (2026)
- La Palma (2025)
- Sinners (2025)
- The Electric State (2025)
- Percy Jackson and the Olympians (2023-present)
- Monarch: Legacy of Monsters (2023-present)
- The Last of Us (2023-present)
- Shadow and Bone (2023)
- Star Trek: Picard (2023)
- Tom Clancy's Jack Ryan (2022-2023)
- Black Panther: Wakanda Forever (2022)
- Paper Girls (2022)
- The Old Man (2022-2024)
- Star Trek: Strange New Worlds (2022-present)
- Morbius (2022)
- Spider-Man: No Way Home (2021)
- The Burning Sea (2021)
- Invasion (2021-present)
- Music (2021)
- Watchmen (2019)
- Star Trek: Discovery (2019-2024)
- Sacred Lies (2018-2020)
- Black Panther (2018)
- The Quake (2018)
- The 12th Man (2017)
- The Fate of the Furious (2017)
- Grand Hotel (2016)
- Pixels (2015)
- The Shamer's Daughter (2015)
- Captain Sabertooth and the Lama Rama Treasure (2014)
- Gåten Ragnarok (2013)
- The Half Brother (2013)
- All That Matters Is Past (2012)
- Kon-Tiki (2012)
- Headhunters (2011)
- Mennesker I Solen (2011)
- King of Devil's Island (2010)
- Trollhunter (2010)
- Limbo (2010)
- The Liverpool Goalie (2010)
- Dead Snow (2009)
- Max Manus: Man of War (2008)
- Peter & the Wolf (2006)
- Free Jimmy (2006)
