= Iwona Sobotka =

Polish opera singer

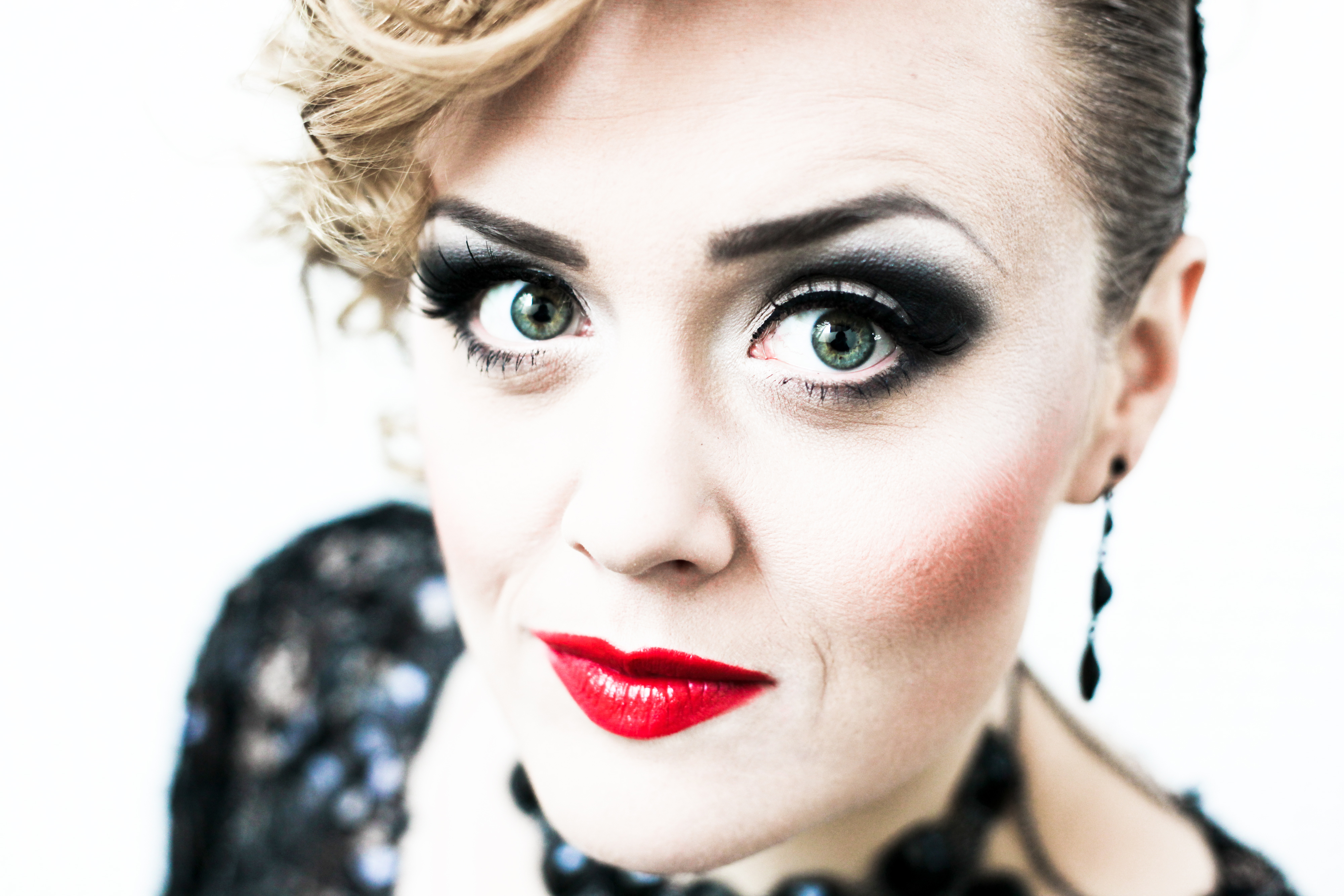
- Born: 19 October 1981 (age 43); Mława, Polish People's Republic
- Occupation: Opera singer (soprano)
- Years active: 2004–present
- Website: www.iwonasobotka.com

Iwona Sobotka (born 19 October 1981) is a Polish soprano and Grand Prix Winner of the Queen Elizabeth Music Competition.

== Education ==
Sobotka was born in Mława. She graduated from the Fryderyk Chopin Academy of Music in Warsaw and continued her studies with Tom Krause at the Reina Sofía School of Music in Madrid.

== Career ==
At the age of 22, she became the youngest winner of singing edition of the Queen Elizabeth Music Competition. Other awards include first prizes at the Warsaw Polish Art Song Competition, the Paderewski Competition in Bydgoszcz and the East & West Artists International Auditions in New York, where she was awarded her debut concert in Carnegie Hall.

Sobotka has performed all over Europe, in the Americas and Japan, in leading venues as the Berlin Philharmonie, the Konzerthaus in Vienna, Salle Pleyel in Paris, Royal Albert Hall in London, Palais de Beaux Arts in Brusseles and Suntory Hall in Tokyo. She has performed with the most important Polish orchestras, as well as other European orchestras such as the Berliner Philharmoniker, Wiener Symphoniker, Rundfunk-Sinfonieorchester Berlin, NDR Sinfonieorchester, Bayerischer Rundfunkorchester, Royal Philharmonic Orchestra, Danish National Symphony Orchestra, Orchestre Philharmonique du Luxembourg, having worked with many of today's pre-eminent conductors including Sir Colin Davies, Sir Simon Rattle, Marco Armiliato, Sylvain Cambreling, Jesus Lopez Cobos, Jacek Kaspszyk, Aleksandar Markovic, Juanjo Mena, Massimo Zanetti and Antoni Wit

She made her opera debut in 2007 at the Opéra National de Paris and appeared also on stage of Komische Oper Berlin, Polish National Opera in Warsaw, Perm Opera and Ballet Theatre, Grand Theatre, Łódź, etc. Her operatic repertoire include roles of Violetta (La traviata), Tatyana (Eugene Onegin), Pamina (The Magic Flute), Donna Anna (Don Giovanni), Mimi (La bohème), Juliette (Roméo et Juliette), Liù (Turandot) or Micaëla (Carmen).

Sobotka is widely acknowledged for her interpretations of Polish vocal repertoire – in particular the works of Karol Szymanowski. In 2004, she contributed to a complete collection of his songs released by the Dutch label Channel Classics and was distinguished by National Academy of Recording Arts in Poland with the "Fryderyk" Award for the most outstanding recording of Polish music. On a subsequent release for EMI Classics in 2006, she performed Songs of a Fairytale Princess with Sir Simon Rattle and the City of Birmingham Symphony Orchestra, which received five stars from the BBC Music Magazine. In 2010 she participated in a 'Szymanowski Focus' program curated by Piotr Anderszewski to promote the music of Symanowski with concerts in Wigmore Hall and Carnegie Hall.

Sobotka is a frequent guest of Rundfunkchor Berlin with whom she appeared several times in Berlin Philharmonic Concert Hall, and also participated at the International Festival of Music and Dance of Granada, along with American superstar organist Cameron Carpenter. Other common projects include recording of Deutsche Motette op. 62 by Richard Strauss for Coviello Classics and appearance at Berliner Cathedral for Christmas Concert along with Deutsches Symphonie-Orchester Berlin (2016).

Concert performances highlights includes concert tour with Berliner Philharmoniker to Japan and Taiwan in a performance of Beethoven 9th Symphony conducted by Sir Simon Rattle (2016), participation in educational project "The Two Fiddlers" in Berlin recorded for Digital Concert Hall also with Berliner Philharmoniker and Sir Simon Rattle, Mahler 8th Symphony with Royal Philharmonic Orchestra in Royal Albert Hall, Verdi Requiem with Radio Orchestra Berlin and Simon Halsey and Turandot concert performance with NDR Radiophilharmonie Hamburg.

Sobotka is a permanent guest of the Festspiele Mecklenburg-Vorpommern, where she received the 2007 Audience Award as well as a frequent guest at festivals such as the La Folle Journée, Schleswig-Holstein Musik Festival, Musical Olympus Festival, Wratislavia Cantans. In 2010 she made her debut in the Schleswig-Holstein Musik Festival in the title role in Stanisław Moniuszko's opera Halka, and continued that association in the summer of 2011, in the role of Liù in Turandot to great critical acclaim.

== Discography ==
Year	Title	Label
2015	Dariusz Przybylski SONGS AND PIANO WORKS	DUX
2015	CHOPIN: Polish Songs	PlayClassics
2013	Richard Strauss: Chorwerke	Coviello Classics
2009	Chopin: Songs	Bearton
2007	Karol Szymanowski / Songs with orchestra	Polskie Radio
2006	Szymanowski: Songs, Harnasie / Sobotka, Rattle	EMI Classics
2004	Szymanowski: Complete songs for Voice and piano	Channel Classics
