= Les Aventures de Colargol =

1970s animated television series

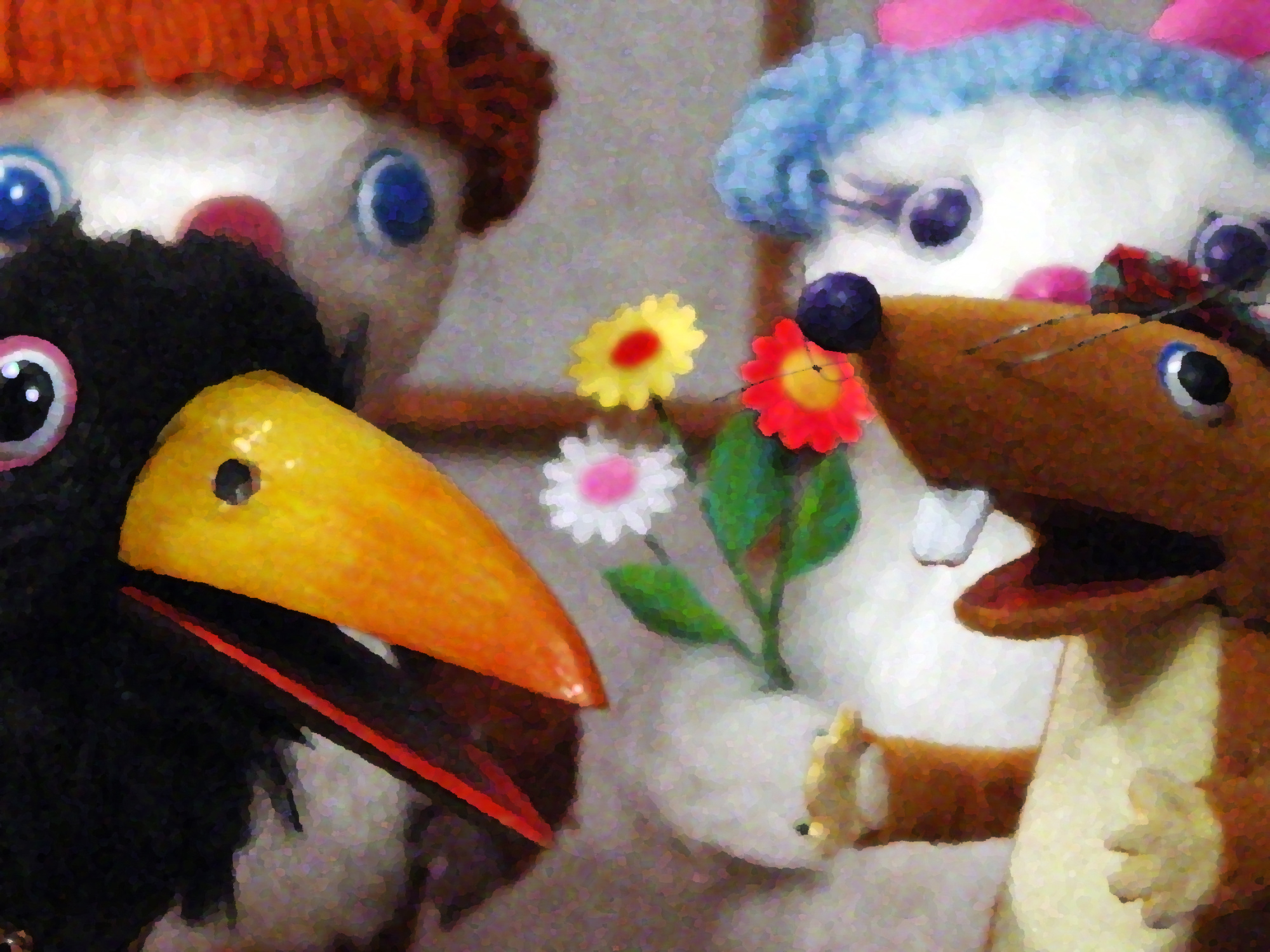
- Genre: Children's television series
- Based on: Colargol by: Albert Barillé; Olga Pouchine
- Countries of origin: France; Poland
- No. of seasons: 1
- No. of episodes: 53

Production
- Producer: Albert Barillé
- Running time: 13 minutes
- Production company: Procidis Se-Ma-For

Original release
- Network: Antenne Deuxième chaîne de l’ORTF TVP1
- Release: November 9, 1970 – January 31, 1974

Related
- Colargol

Les Aventures de Colargol is a Franco-Polish stop-motion animated television series which ran for 53 episodes of 13 minutes each, created by Albert Barillé after the Colargol created by Olga Pouchine and broadcast from November 9, 1970 to January 31, 1974 on the Deuxième chaîne de l’ORTF. The series has been successfully exported to many countries.

In Quebec, it was broadcast in the fall of 1973 in the "Bagatelle" program block on Télévision de Radio-Canada.

== Background ==
In 1969, Albert Barillé, independent producer, financed the series himself (in the face of opposition by French channel ORTF) and entrusted the production to Tadeusz Wilkosz, founder of the Polish studio Se-ma-for.

== Synopsis ==
The happy and singing adventures of a bear cub named Colargol whose only desire is to sing. Unfortunately, he doesn't have the talent for it.

== Episodes ==
No.	Title	Original release date
1	(French: Un matin à Bois-Joli; Polish: Poranek Misia)	November 9, 1970 (France); 1969 (Poland)
2	(French: Un ours qui vole; Polish: Fruwający Miś)	1969
3	(French: Chez le roi des oiseaux; Polish: Miś u Króla Ptaków)	1969
4	(French: Le Concert; Polish: Koncert Misia)	1970
5	(French: Au cirque Pimoulu; Polish: Cyrk Pimoulu)	1970
6	(French: Chanteur de cirque; Polish: Cyrkowa sława Misia)	1970
7	(French: La Délivrance; Polish: Oswobodzenie Misia)	1969
8	(French: Qu'on est bien dans l'eau; Polish: Ostatnia lekcja)	1970
9	(French: Aventures en mer; Polish: Miś na morzu)	1970
10	(French: Colargol moussaillon; Polish: Colargol marynarzem)	1970
11	(French: La Révolte; Polish: Ucieczka Misia)	1970
12	(French: Au pôle nord; Polish: Colargol na biegunie północnym)	1970
13	(French: En route pour Bois-Joli; Polish: Powrót Misia)	1970
14	(French: Dans l'espace; Polish: Miś w przestworzach)	1971
15	(French: En route pour le cosmos; Polish: Colargol kosmonautą)	1971
16	(French: Dans le cosmos; Polish: Miś w kosmosie)	1971
17	(French: Sur la lune; Polish: Colargol na księżycu)	1971
18	(French: Dans la fantasmagorie; Polish: Colargol na fantasmagorii)	1971
19	(French: Vers la météorologie; Polish: Colargol na meteorologii)	1972
20	(French: Chez la fée Carabosse; Polish: Miś u wróżki Carabosse)	1972
21	(French: Le Retour; Polish: Powrót na Ziemię)	1972
22	(French: Les Vacances; Polish: Wakacje Colargola)	1972
23	(French: Nos amis arrivent; Polish: W oczekiwaniu przyjaciół)	1972
24	(French: Nordine est là; Polish: Witaj Nordynko)	1972
25	(French: Colargol garçon d'honneur; Polish: Colargol drużbą)	1972
26	(French: 26.Le Mariage de corbeau; Polish: Wesele Kruka)	1972
27	(French: Adieu Nordine; Polish: Pożegnanie z Nordynką)	1972
28	(French: L'Hiver à bois joli; Polish: Zimowe kłopoty)	1972
29	(French: Le Sifflet perdu; Polish: Zgubiony flecik)	1972
30	(French: Seul sous les eaux; Polish: Miś pod wodą)	1972
31	(French: Bonjour printemps; Polish: Witaj wiosno)	1972
32	(French: Rencontre avec Toutpoil; Polish: Wędrujący Miś)	1973
33	(French: La Grande Fête; Polish: Colargol na festiwalu)	1973
34	(French: Colargol au far west; Polish: Colargol kowbojem)	1973
35	(French: Le trésor volé; Polish: Miś na Dzikim Zachodzie)	1973
36	(French: Les Poursuivants poursuivis; Polish: Colargol i dyliżans)	1973
37	(French: Chez les bandits; Polish: Miś i banda Złego Kida)	1973
38	(French: Le Pacific Express; Polish: Colargol i Ekspress)	1973
39	(French: Golden Cioty; Polish: Miś w Golden City)	1973
40	(French: Tout va rentrer dans l'ordre; Polish: Colargol szeryfem)	1973
41	(French: Colargol et les tulipes d'or; Polish: Colargol w Holandii)	1973
42	(French: Colargol en Grande Bretagne; Polish: Colargol w Anglii)	1973
43	(French: En Amérique; Polish: Colargol w Ameryce)	1974
44	(French: Colargol en Amérique Latine; Polish: Colargol w Meksyku)	1974
45	(French: Colargol en Australie; Polish: Colargol w Australii)	1974
46	(French: Dans les steppes de Sibérie; Polish: Colargol na Syberii)	1974
47	(French: Colargol aux Indes; Polish: Colargol w Indiach)	1974
48	(French: Colargol en Afrique; Polish: Colargol w Egipcie)	1974
49	(French: Au cœur de l'Afrique; Polish: Colargol w Afryce)	1974
50	(French: Retour d'Afrique; Polish: Colargol na Saharze)	1974
51	(French: Le Grand Retour; Polish: Wielki powrót Colargola)	1974
52	(French: Conte de Noël N°1; Polish: Nasza choinka)	January 31, 1974
53	(French: Conte de Noël N°2; Polish: Świąteczny wieczór)	January 31, 1974
