= Teddy Drop Ear =

Polish animated character and television series

- Main character of the show, Teddy Drop Ear
- Written by: Czesław Janczarski
- Narrated by: Mieczysław Czechowicz
- Theme music composer: Janusz Galewicz (lyrics); Piotr Hertel (music); Mieczysław Czechowicz (vocals)
- Country of origin: Poland
- Original language: Polish
- No. of episodes: 104

Production
- Producer: Se-ma-for

Original release
- Network: Telewizja Polska
- Release: 1975 – 1987

Teddy Drop Ear (Polish: Miś Uszatek), also spelled as Teddy Drop-Ear and known as Teddy Floppy Ear, is a Polish animated television series produced by Se-ma-for from 1975 to 1987, for a total of 104 episodes. He was created jointly by Polish writer Czesław Janczarski and cartoonist Zbigniew Rychlicki.

== History ==
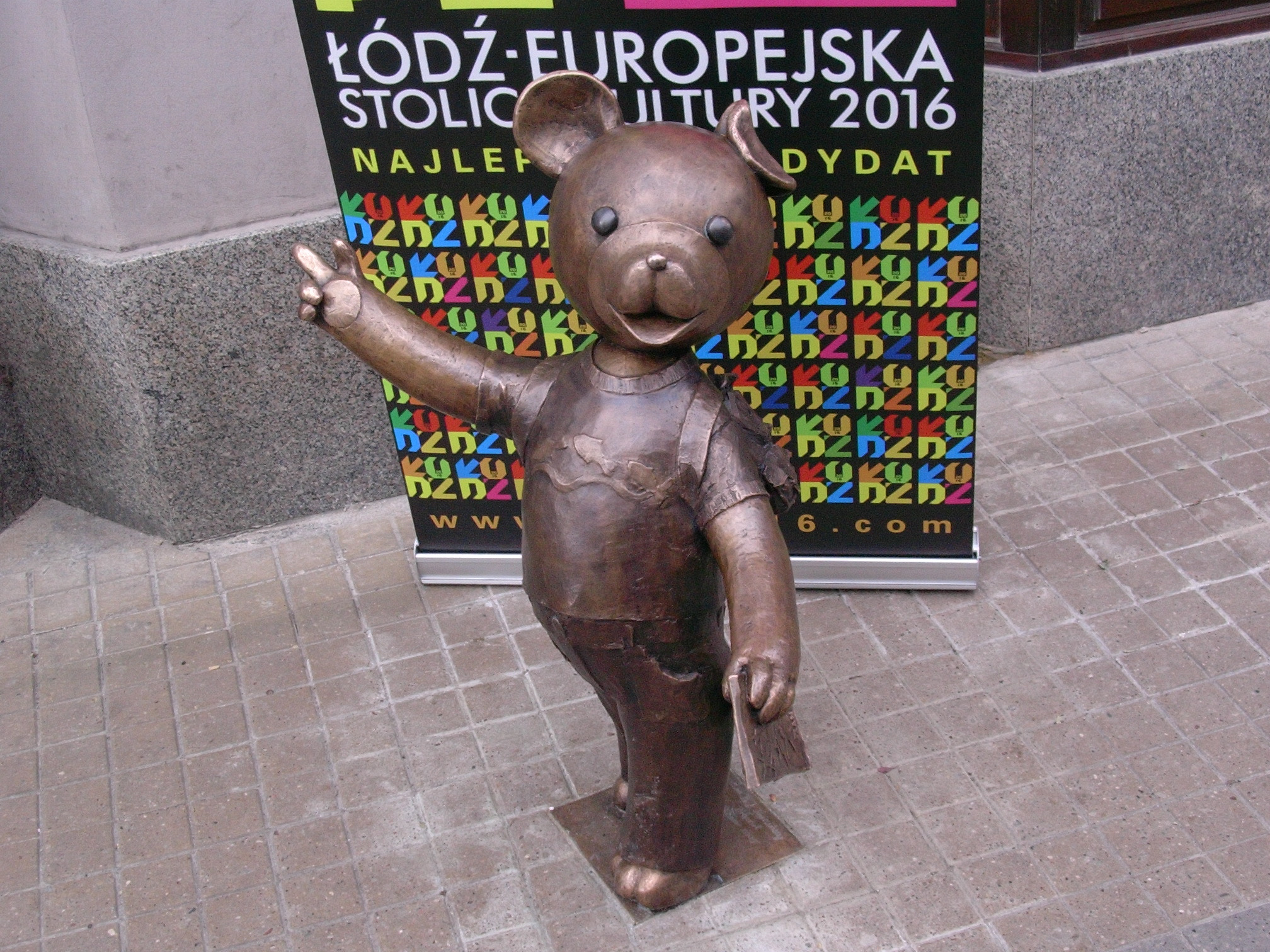
The sculpture of Miś Uszatek on the Piotrkowska Street in Łódź.

Miś Uszatek's first appearance was in a Polish comic magazine for children, "Miś", on 6 March 1957. Later, he was the main character of several children's books, which were translated into many languages. However, Miś Uszatek became very popular in 1975, when Łódź Animated Forms Studio (Studio Malych Form Filmowych), Se-ma-for, created a series of stop motion animation for the Polish TV network, featuring actor Mieczysław Czechowicz, who voiced the characters. In all-time Polish rankings of animated programs, the show usually comes second only to Bolek i Lolek.

Miś Uszatek and his friends—Prosiaczek (Piglet), Króliczki (Little Rabbits), Zajączek (Little Hare), as well as Kruczek the Puppy—were loved by preteen kids. At the same time, Teddy Drop Ear played the role of a friend from kindergarten. He was also liked by parents, as he would always go to bed at an appropriate hour, singing the goodnight song:

Pora na dobranoc, bo już księżyc świeci. Dzieci lubią misie, misie lubią dzieci. (It's time to go to bed, as the moon is shining. Kids like teddy bears, teddy bears like kids.)

All together, Se-ma-for created 104 episodes of the animation series; the last one was made in 1987. In the 1960s, two theatrical movies about the friendly bear were made. Also, in the fall of 2007, the Se-ma-for studio announced that it was planning to make more episodes, but later these plans changed in favor of a possible full-length movie, to be created with help from the Japanese company Eden Entertainment. As of 2008, Mis Uszatek airs on Polish TV every Thursday.

In July 2007, local authorities in Łódź decided to construct a monument dedicated to Miś Uszatek, to be placed along Łódź's main street, Piotrkowska.

== Miś Uszatek abroad ==
The animation series is also popular in other countries; it is one of the best-selling exports of Polish television. All together, Polish TV have sold it to 22 countries, including Canada, Iran, and a number of African nations.

- In Belarus (post-USSR) as Аблавушак
- In Catalonia (Spain) as Les històries de l'osset Faluc
- In Czech as Medvídek Ušáček and aired on ČST1 as part of Večerníček.
- In Finland it is known as Nalle Luppakorva and it was so popular there that dolls featuring the series' characters were once stolen from an exhibition.
- In Hungary as Füles Mackó and aired on MTVA as part of TV Maci.
- In Israel as הרפתקאותיו של דובון
- In Japan as Oyasumi Kuma-chan (おやすみ、クマちゃん, Good night, little bear).
- In the Netherlands as Teddy Hangoor
- In Macedonia as Мечето Ушко (Mecheto Ushko)
- In Portugal as O urso Teddy
- In Russia (post-USSR) as Мишка-Ушастик
- In Slovakia as Macko Uško
- In Slovenia as Medvedek Uhec
- In the United Kingdom as Teddy Drop Ear with voices by Jeni Barnett as part of the TV-am children's magazine programme Rub-a-Dub-Tub.

In June 2010, Mennica Polska S.A. minted 8,000 silver 1-dollar coins depicting Miś Uszatek on behalf of the government of Niue.

In the UK, the footage from this animation series was also shown on Tots TV as animated illustrations for some of Tom's stories which he makes up and writes “himself”.
