= Maciej Zembaty =

Polish artist, writer, singer, and comedian

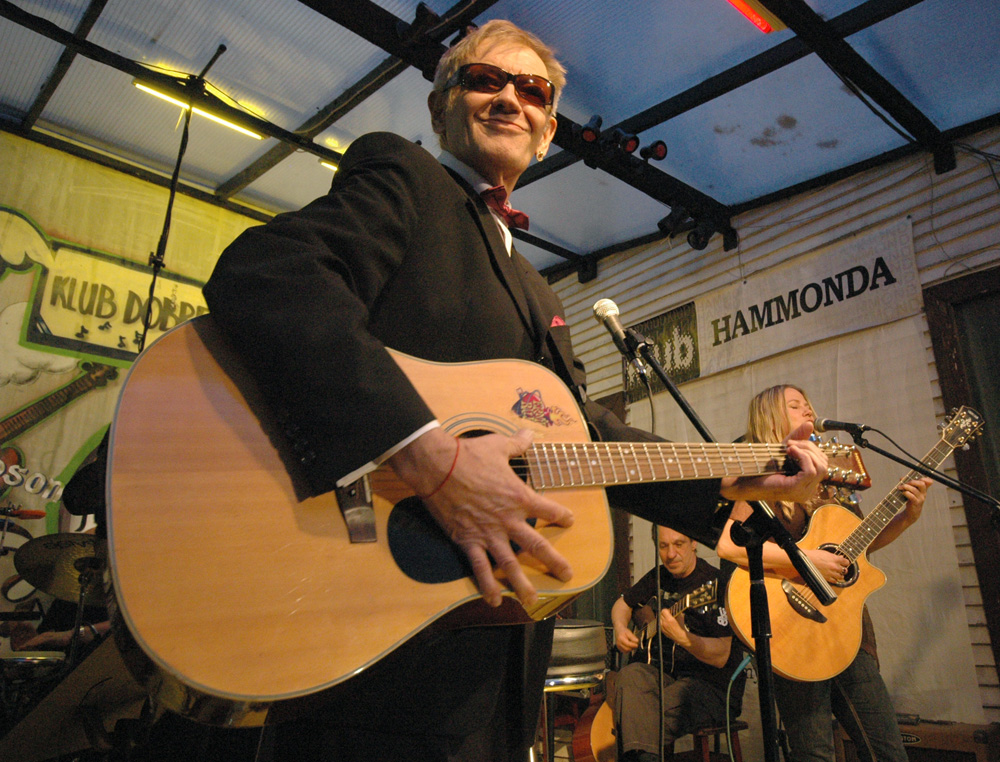
Maciej Zembaty

Maciej Zembaty (16 May 1944 – 27 June 2011) was a Polish artist, writer, journalist, singer, poet and comedian. Despite being considered one of the classics of Polish black humour, he is perhaps best known as a translator and populariser of songs and poems by Leonard Cohen.

== Life ==
Maciej Zembaty was born on 16 May 1944 in Tarnów, and raised in Wadowice in Poland. He graduated from a musical lyceum (piano class) and attended an artistic lyceum (which he never graduated from). Afterwards he graduated from the Warsaw University's faculty of Polish language and literature. His thesis was one of the first studies of grypsera, a distinct slang language used by the criminals and inmates of prisons in Poland.

His stage debut was a brief appearance at the Opole Song Festival in 1965, where he was awarded with a prize for the best featuring song author. In 1972, together with Jacek Janczarski, he created the story of Poszepszyński Family, one of the best-known and longest-running comic series ever aired in the Polish Radio. It has been aired for 25 consecutive years and became one of the icons of the Polish popular culture of the epoch. Zembaty himself also appeared in the series giving his voice to the iconic personality of Maurycy. In the 1980s he performed in a duet with John Porter.

Later that year he also received a number of records of Leonard Cohen, whose songs he started to translate. In several months he created a dozen or so translations, most of which became hits in Poland even before the original songs by Cohen became available and known to wider audience. From that time on Zembaty became known primarily as the translator of Leonard Cohen's work into Polish. He holds the record for Leonard Cohen covers, having translated and recorded at least 60 songs over 10 albums. One of the albums (1985 Alleluja) was sold in over 400,000 copies in Poland and became a golden record. In addition, Zembaty published a number of books with translations of Cohen's poetry, some of them in official printing houses, while other unofficially in the samizdat. Zembaty's translation of The Partisan became one of the informal anthems of Solidarity during the Martial Law in Poland.

Apart from his career as a translator of poems by Cohen, Zembaty continued his career as a journalist, comic and writer. He co-authored the screenplays to a number of films, as well as being the author of many songs. He also translated a number of Russian folk songs, most of them related to Blat, a Russian version of the Polish grypsera.

== Bibliography ==
1. Maciej Zembaty and Emilia Freudenreich (1976). Historia, która przydarzyła się pewnej pszczołopodobnej Prudencji (in Polish). Warsaw: KAW.
2. Maciej Zembaty; Edward Stachura; Vladimir Vysotski (1992). Piosenki (in Polish). Warsaw: Anagram. p. 176. ISBN 83-86086-92-0.
3. Maciej Zembaty and Jacek Janczarski (1997). Rodzina Poszepszyńskich Story (in Polish). Warsaw: Da Capo. p. 192. ISBN 83-7157-242-5.
4. Maciej Zembaty (2002). Maciej Zembaty (in Polish). Warsaw: Twój Styl. p. 113. ISBN 83-7163-314-9.
5. Maciej Zembaty (2003). Mój Cohen (in Polish). Warsaw: MTJ Agencja Artystyczna. p. 232. ISBN 83-911888-9-2.
