= Przygód kilka wróbla Ćwirka =

Animated film series

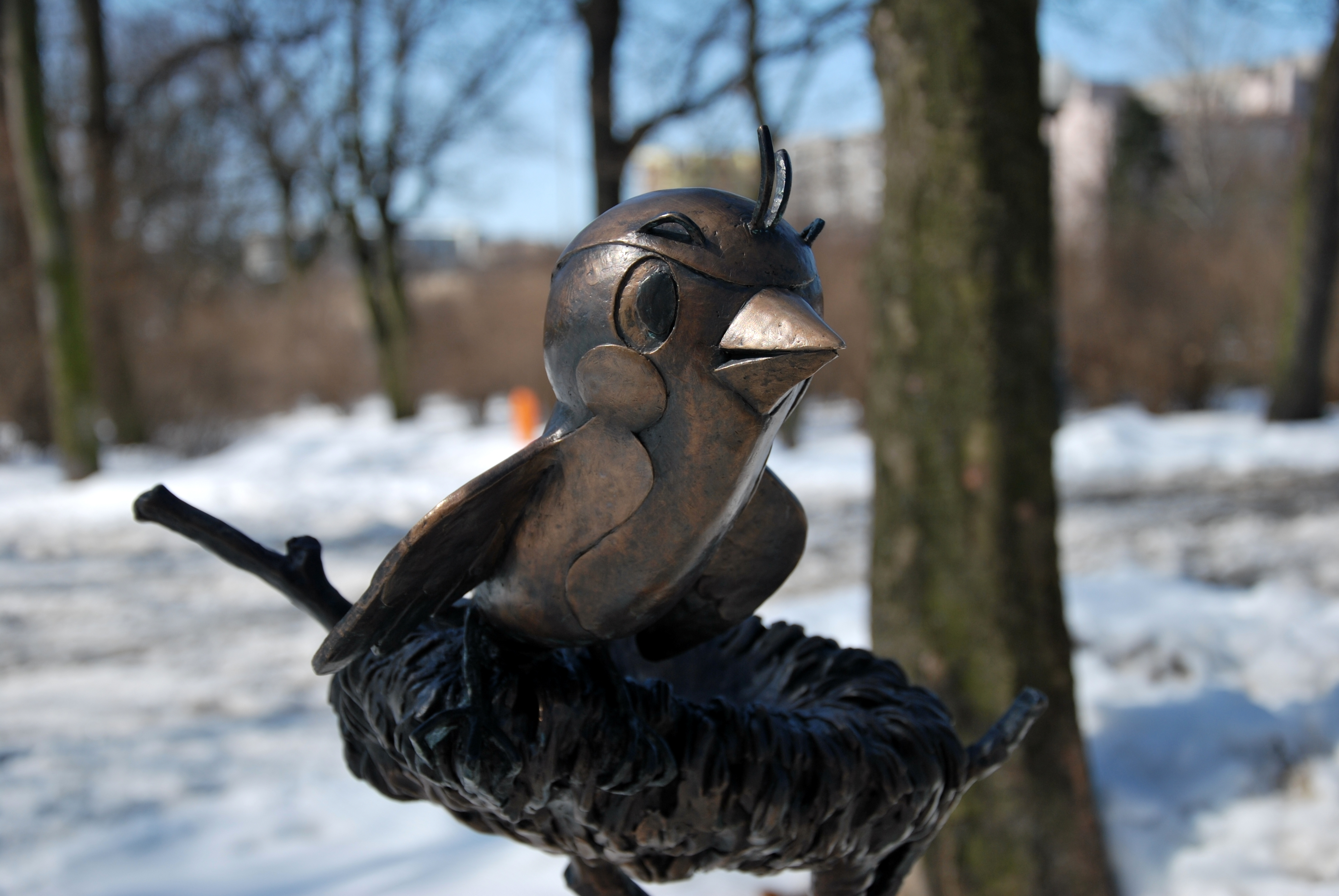
The sculpture of Ćwirek sparrow.

Przygód kilka wróbla Ćwirka (A Few Adventures of Sparrow Tweet) was a Polish animated children's television series during 1983-1989 (39 episodes, about 9 min. each) made by Se-ma-for studio.
