= Zaczarowany ołówek =

Polish animated television series

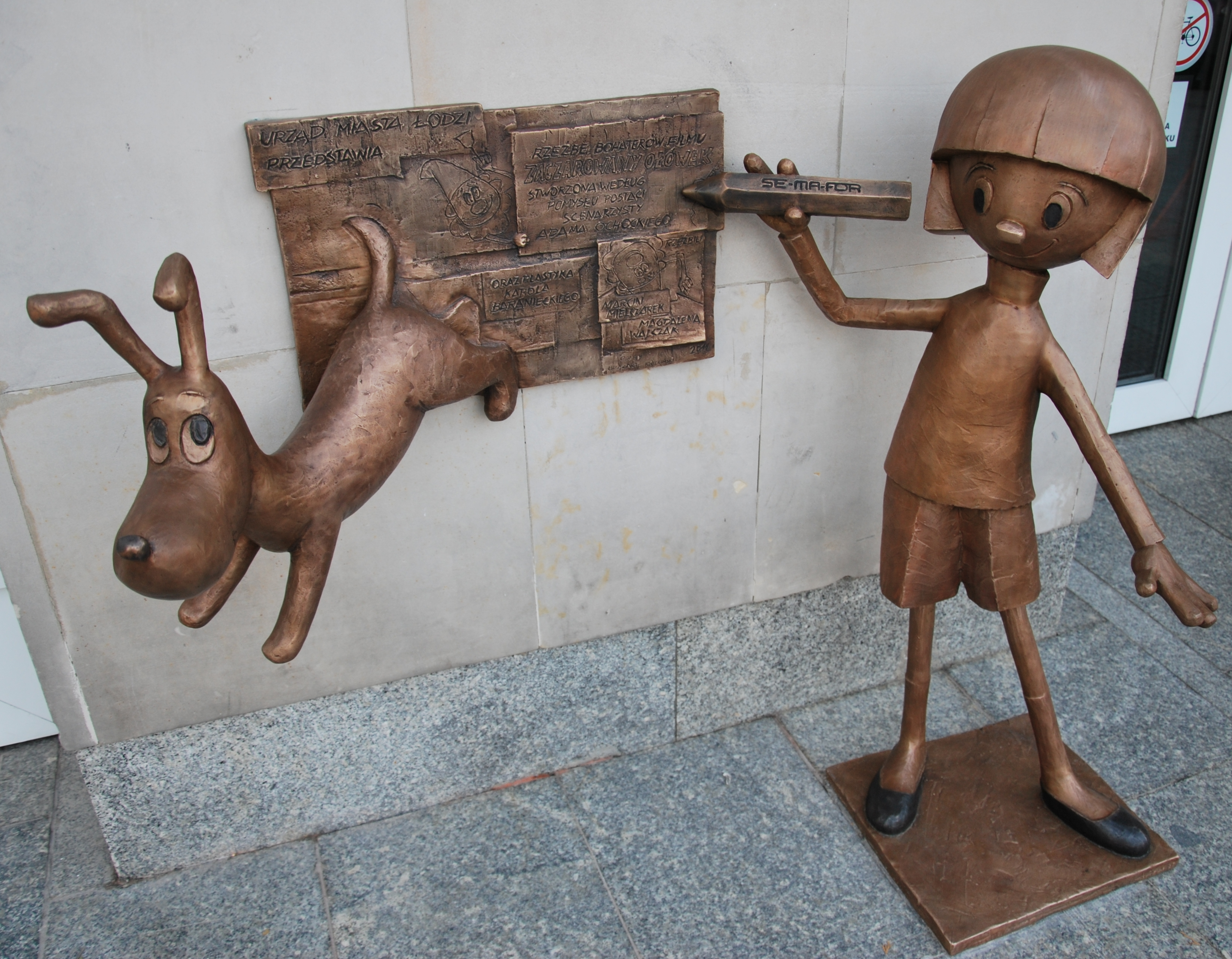
The sculpture of the main characters of The Enchanted Pencil in Łódź.

The Enchanted Pencil (Polish: Zaczarowany ołówek) is a Polish cartoon from 1964 to 1977 made by Se-ma-for.

The series had no dialogue. It tells a story of a boy named Piotr (Peter) and his dog, aided by an enchanted pencil, which can materialize anything they draw. There were 39 episodes total. The first 26 episodes have no linking story, but the last 13 are centered on the heroes' quest to save a shipwrecked refugee. The series was remade into a movie in 1991.

The series was aired on Telewizja Polska in 70's, it was also aired on DFF in Germany, Channel 4 in UK (as part of Pob's Programme), Rai 1 in Italy, MTVA in Hungary, HRT in Croatia, ABC and SBS in Australia, Fuji TV in Japan, TV3 in Sweden, TVE1 in Spain, ETC.

- Script: Adam Ochocki
- Art: Karol Baraniecki
- Music: Zbigniew Czernelecki and Waldemar Kazanecki

== List of episodes ==
#	Title (Polish)	English translation	Director	Production Date
Main series (1964–1970)
1	Na podwórzu	In the Yard	K. Baraniecki	January 10, 1964
2	Pogoń	The Pursuit	A. Piliczewski	February 5, 1964
3	Alarm w zoo	Alarm in the Zoo	A. Kotowska	March 12, 1964
4	Opiekun ptaków	The Birdhouses	Z. Czernelecki	April 20, 1964
5	Powódź	The Flood	J. Skrobiński	May 18, 1965
6	Zbłąkani w lesie	Stray in the Woods	A. Piliczewski	June 8, 1965
7	Katastrofa w górach	Disaster in the Mountains	Z. Czernelecki	July 22, 1965
8	Wilk morski	The Sea Wolf	Z. Czernelecki	August 15, 1965
9	Chodzi lis koło drogi	Fox Around the Road	A. Kotowska	September 3, 1965
10	W starej szopie	In the Old Hut	A. Piliczewski	October 10, 1965
11	W cieniu sosny	The Shade of the Pines	Z. Czernelecki	March 7, 1966
12	Kajtek	Baby's Escape	A. Piliczewski	April 21, 1966
13	Worek prezentów	Bag with Gifts	A. Kotowska	December 23, 1966
14	Czerwony kur	The Red Rooster	Z. Czernelecki	January 9, 1969
15	Podwodny skarb	Underwater Treasure	Z. Czernelecki	February 20, 1969
16	Szalony pociąg	Crazy Train	Z. Czernelecki	March 28, 1969
17	Sroczka złodziejka	The Thieving Magpie	L. Kronic	April 18, 1969
18	Wakacje z duchem	Holidays with the Spirit	A. Kotowska	May 30, 1969
19	Błękitno czerwoni	Music School	Z. Czernelecki	June 22, 1969
20	Jak poskromić lwy	How to Tame Lions	A. Kotowska	January 11, 1970
21	Na skraju przepaści	On the Edge of the Abyss	L. Kronic	February 9, 1970
22	Latawiec Kajtka	Kajtka's Kite	Z. Czernelecki	March 5, 1970
23	Orzeszki na zimę	Nuts for the Winter	A. Piliczewski	April 14, 1970
24	Śpioch w jaskini	Sleeping Bag in a Cave	L. Kronic	May 19, 1970
25	Krążek do bramki	Panel on the ice	A. Piliczewski	June 25, 1970
26	Mały kowboj	The Little Cowboy	L. Kronic	July 30, 1970
Journey with the Enchanted Pencil (1974–1977)
27	Tajemnicza butelka	The Mysterious Bottle	Z. Czernelecki	March 3, 1974
28	Lajba tonie	The Dump is Down	Z. Czernelecki	April 12, 1974
29	Cała naprzód	All Aboard	Z. Czernelecki	May 21, 1974
30	Macki ośmiornicy	The Octopus	L. Kronic	June 15, 1974
31	U celu podróży	On the Robinson	A. Piliczewski	February 10, 1975
32	Małpie figle	The Monkey Tricks	A. Kotowska	March 18, 1975
33	Safari z kamerą	Safari with a Camera	L. Kronic	April 24, 1975
34	Dwa do zera	Two to Zero	R. Szymczack	May 30, 1975
35	Niespodziewana wizyta	Unexpected Visit	Z. Czernelecki	June 27, 1975
36	W starym młynie	The Old Mill	Z. Czernelecki	January 15, 1976
37	Pojedynek w buszu	Duel in the Wild	I. Czesny	February 21, 1976
38	Marynarski chrzest	Sailor's Baptism	A. Piliczewski	March 29, 1976
39	W okowach lodu	Icebound	L. Kronic	April 16, 1977

== Reception and influence ==
The show has been described as influential on the generation of Polish engineeres working in the fields of rapid prototyping and similar. It has also been influential on the genre of Polish animation and has been described as a "classic".

The series received a number of awards at international festivals, and has been aired in about 50 countries.

The series has also been discussed in the context of empowering children and encouraging their imagination.

The sculpture of the main characters of The Enchanted Pencil was unveiled in Łódź in 1991.

== Notes ==
In 1963, the first episode to be produced was the sixth one, entitled "Stray in the Woods"
