= Se-ma-for =

Animation studio

- Industry: Animation, production, distribution, licensing
- Founded: 1947
- Defunct: 2018
- Headquarters: Łódź, Poland
- Area served: Worldwide
- Website: www.se-ma-for.com

Se-ma-for was a Polish film and animation studio. Founded in Łódź, Poland in 1947, the company has created many animated cartoons and stop motion animations for young and older audiences. The name, meaning literally Se-ma-phore, is an acronym of Studio Małych Form Filmowych - Studio of Small Film Forms. The studio was shut down in 2018.

Its most famous productions include the children's shows: Miś Uszatek, Tots TV, Przygody misia Colargola, The Moomins (pol. Opowiadania Muminków), Troubles the Cat, Przygody kota Filemona, Przygód kilka wróbla Ćwirka, Zaczarowany ołówek, and the film Peter and the Wolf.

Józef Skrobiński worked at this studio for some time.

From June 2008 to September 2016, the studio was located at ul. Targowa 1/3 on the premises of the old EC1 heat and power plant, where the National Center for Film Culture was established. In September 2016, the studio and the Animation Museum moved to the WIMA post-industrial complex at al. Piłsudskiego 135. In 2017, the studio was moved to the building at ul. Sienkiewicza 100, where it operated until May 2018. In May 2018, after the president's resignation and his departure from Poland, the studio's activity was suspended.

== Peter and the Wolf ==
In February 2008, one of its short animated films, Peter and the Wolf directed by Suzie Templeton and Marek Skrobecki as the chief set designer and co-director, received the Academy Award for Best Animated Short Film. It was the second Oscar-winning film made by the studio - the first came in the same category in 1982 – Tango by Zbigniew Rybczyński.

The principal photography was shot entirely in within the Se-ma-for animation studios in Łódź, Poland.
