= Przygody kota Filemona =

Polish Cartoon

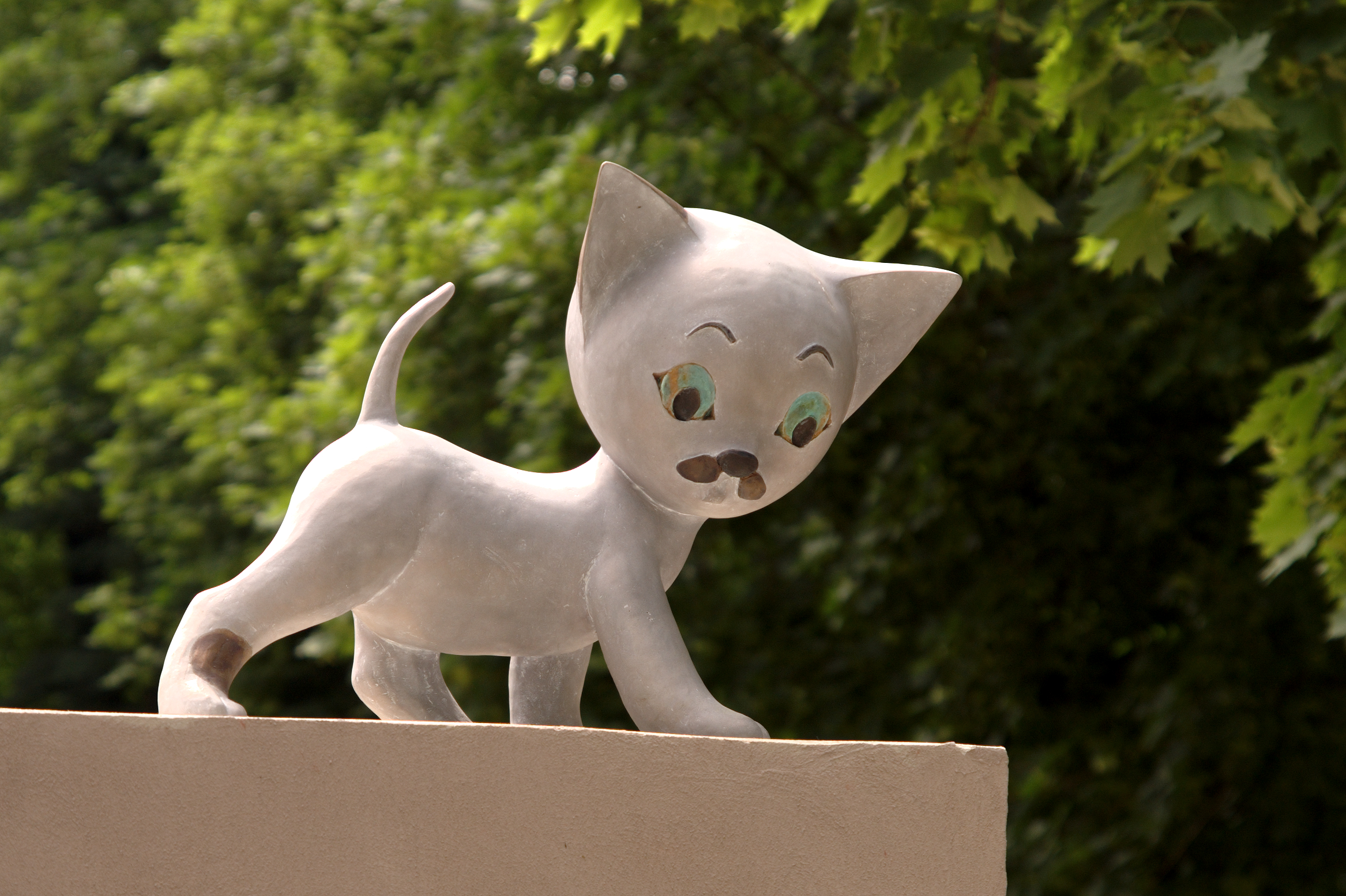
Filemon sculpture in Łódź.

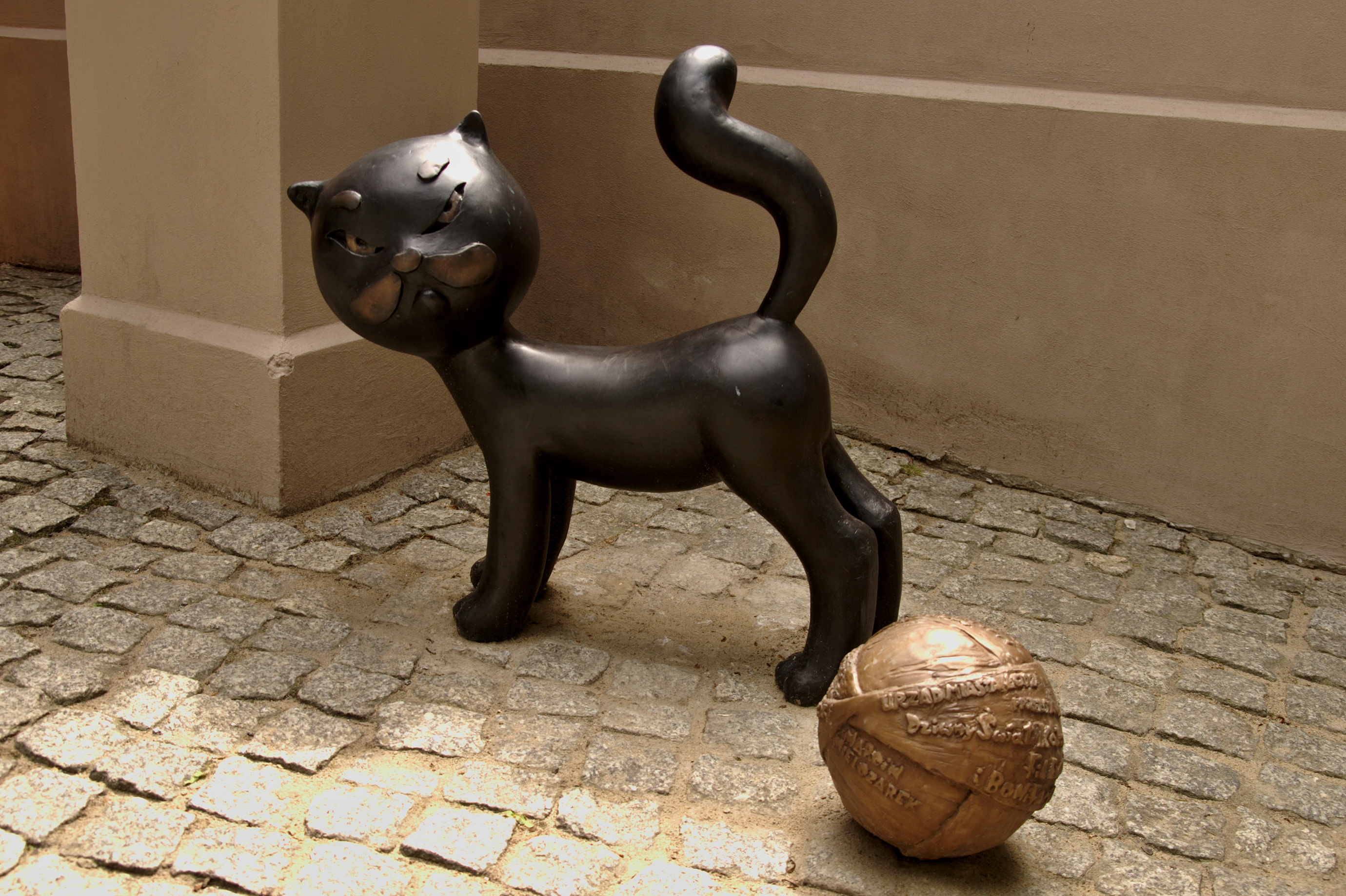
Bonifacy sculpture in Łódź

Przygody kota Filemona (The Adventures of Filemon the Cat) (originally known as Dziwny świat kota Filemona) is a Polish animated television series for children. It ran for 39 episodes between 1972 and 1981.

== Description ==
The two main characters are: Filemon, a little white kitten, young and naïve; and Bonifacy, an old, serious black tomcat. Other characters are: the Grandmother, the Grandfather, the Puppy, a fox, mice, 'monsters from the attic', and other creatures. The cartoon is rich in elements of Polish folk legends and traditions.

The Adventures of Filemon the Cat was narrated by actresses Teresa Sawicka (episodes 1-13) and Barbara Marszałek (episodes 14-39).

== Production ==
The series was created by Marek Nejman, a Polish screenplay writer, and produced by animation studio Se-ma-for in Łódź, Poland. Up to the 13th episode the series was called Dziwny świat kota Filemona (The strange world of Filemon the Cat).

In the 1990s one full-length film and two more short ones were made. Animator Andrzej Bzdak took part in this project.

== Episodes ==
1. My name's Filemon (Nazywam się Filemon) – Ludwik Kronic
2. A winter evening (Zimowy wieczór) – Alina Kotowska
3. Easter clean-up (Wielkanocne sprzątanie)– Wacław Fedak
4. Great washing (Wielkie pranie) – Ludwik Kronic
5. Hide-and-seek (Zabawa w chowanego) – Ludwik Kronic
6. Ah, those mice (Ach te myszy) - Alina Kotowska
7. When the leaves fall (Kiedy liście opadają)– Ryszard Szymczak
8. Tastes differ (Co kto lubi) – Alina Kotowska
9. Afternoon nap (Poobiednia drzemka) – Ireneusz Czesny
10. Something for a sound sleeper (Sposób na twardy sen)– Ryszard Szymczak
11. A serious problem (Poważne zmartwienie) – Ireneusz Czesny
12. Hitch–hiking to town (Autostopem do miasta) – Wacław Fedak
13. The place above the oven (Miejsce na zapiecku)– Wacław Fedak
14. Surprise (Niespodzianka) – Ludwik Kronic
15. A Trick (Fortel) – Wacław Fedak
16. Which way the wind blows (Szukaj wiatru w polu) – Ireneusz Czesny
17. Christmas Eve (Gwiazdka) – Ludwik Kronic
18. Noises in the wardrobe (Co w szafie piszczy) – Wacław Fedak
19. Who does not work (Kto nie pracuje) – Ireneusz Czesny
20. Like cat and dog (Jak pies z kotem) – Alina Kotowska
21. The cats` patos (Kocie drogi) – Alina Kotowska
22. A cuckoo clock (Zegar z kukułką)– Ireneusz Czesny
23. As hungry as a wolf (Wilczy apetyt) – Andrzej Piliczewski
24. In the attic (Strych) – Ludwik Kronic
25. A cat in a bag (Kupić kota w worku)– Andrzej Piliczewski
26. A hole in the fence (Dziura w płocie)– Alina Kotowska
27. April weather (Kwiecień-plecień)– Zbigniew Czernelecki
28. Puppy games (Szczenięce figle)– Ireneusz Czesny
29. An evening walk (Nocny spacer)– Alina Kotowska
30. The cat's aria (Kocia aria)– Andrzej Piliczewski
31. What a mess (Groch z kapustą)– Andrzej Piliczewski
32. Competition (Turniej)– Zbigniew Czernelecki
33. A loyal companion (Najwierniejszy towarzysz)– Alina Kotowska
34. Fox, a friend (Przyjaciel lis) – Zbigniew Czernelecki
35. A place of my own (Własny kąt)– Ireneusz Czesny
36. Patch on patch (Łata na łacie)– Alina Kotowska
37. Sweet life (Słodkie życie)– Ireneusz Czesny
38. Warming up (Rozgrzewka)– Andrzej Piliczewski
39. Bonifacy, wait a minute (Poczekaj Bonifacy)– Ireneusz Czesny
