= List of programs broadcast by Disney Channel (Germany) =

The List of programs broadcast by Disney Channel (Germany) lists various series and shows that are broadcast, have been broadcast or are about to be broadcast by Disney Channel in Germany. The programs in daytime (from 5:30 am to 7:19 pm) is aimed primarily at preschoolers, big kids, and tweens, while the programs in prime time (from 7:20 pm to 5:29 am) is aimed at teenagers and adults. Teleshopping programs are not included in this list. The entire TV program is broadcast in German. For this purpose, foreign-language series and shows receive a German dubbing.

== Disney Channel Germany Original Productions ==
=== Daytime ===
Title	Genre	Premiere Date	Final Date	Seasons	Source
Kurze Pause	Sitcom	September 18, 2006	October 24, 2008	3 seasons, 80 episodes + 1 special	
Binny and the Ghost	Crime-Fantasy-Comedy drama-Series	March 23, 2013	May 15, 2016	2 seasons, 23 episodes	
An die Töpfe, fertig, lecker!	Cooking show	April 2, 2017	August 15, 2021	5 seasons, 73 episodes + 1 special	
Die Beni Challenge	Educational show	April 21, 2018	TBA	7 seasons, 116 episodes + 1 special	
Gag Attack	Sketch comedy	January 12, 2019	September 10, 2023	4 seasons, 55 episodes + 2 specials	
Tierduell	Educational show	September 8, 2019	June 24, 2023	4 seasons, 53 episodes	

=== Primetime ===
Title	Genre	Premiere Date	Final Date	Seasons	Source
Ducks & Friends	Talk show	January 18, 2014	April 12, 2014	1 season, 13 episodes	
Disney Family Time	Game show	February 28, 2014	September 21, 2014	1 season, 6 episodes	
Vollpension bei Fremden	Dokutainment	May 20, 2014	August 5, 2014	1 season, 8 episodes	
Mein Auftrag: Der perfekte Antrag	Dokutainment	August 12, 2014	September 2, 2014	1 season, 4 episodes	
Das Fest im Griff?!	Dokutainment	September 9, 2014	September 30, 2014	1 season, 4 episodes	
Mission Freundlichkeit - Mein 100 Tage Experiment	Social experiment	October 7, 2014	November 11, 2014	1 season, 6 episodes	
Disney Magic Moments	Ranking show	November 25, 2014	December 18, 2017	4 seasons, 25 episodes + 12 specials	
Disney Magic Moments – Die große Quizshow	Game show	February 4, 2019	February 25, 2019	1 season, 4 episodes	

== Current programming ==
=== Daytime ===
- Adventures of the Gummi Bears (Gummibärenbande)
- Alice's Wonderland Bakery (Alice in der Wunderland-Bäckerei)
- Art Attack
- Big City Greens
- Bluey
- Chip 'n' Dale: Park Life (Chip und Chap: Das Leben im Park)
- DuckTales
- Firebuds (Firebuds - Freunde im Einstaz)
- Ghostforce
- The Ghost and Molly McGee (Der Geist und Molly McGee)
- Good Luck Charlie (Meine Schwester Charlie)
- Gravity Falls (Willkommen in Gravity Falls)
- Gus, the Itsy Bitsy Knight (Gus – Der klitzekleine Ritter)
- Hailey's On It! (Haileys Mission)
- Hamster and Gretel (Hamster und Gretel)
- Kiff (Liff Und Barry)
- Kiya & the Kimoja Heroes (Kiya & die Kimoja-Helden)
- Moon Girl and Devil Dinosaur (Moon Girl and Devil Dinosaur)
- Mère et Fille (Maman & Ich)
- Mickey and the Roadster Racers (Micky und die flinken Flitzer)
- Mickey Mouse (Micky Maus)
- Mickey Mouse Clubhouse (Micky Maus Wunderhaus)
- Mickey Mouse Funhouse (Micky Maus: Spielhaus)
- Milo Murphy's Law (Schlimmer geht's immer mit Milo Murphy)
- Miraculous Ladybug (Miraculous – Geschichten von Ladybug und Cat Noir)
- Mystery Lane (Mystery Lane: Ein Fall für Clever & Bro)
- Phineas and Ferb (Phineas und Ferb)
- The Boss Baby: Back in Business (The Boss Baby – Wieder im Geschäft)
- PJ Masks (PJ Masks - Pyjamahelden)
- Rainbow High
- Sofia the First (Sofia die Erste – Auf einmal Prinzessin)
- Spider-Man (Spider-Man)
- Spidey and His Amazing Friends (Spidey und seine Super-Freunde)
- SuperKitties
- Taffy
- Tangled: The Series (Rapunzel – Die Serie)
- The Unstoppable Yellow Yeti (Der fantastische Yellow Yeti)
- The Wonderful World of Mickey Mouse (Die wunderbare Welt von Micky Maus)

=== Primetime ===
- According to Jim (Immer wieder Jim)
- The Golden Girls (Golden Girls)
- Home Improvement (Hör mal, wer da hämmert)
- Modern Family

== Former programming ==
=== Daytime ===
- 50/50 Heroes (Halbe Helden)
- The 7D (Die 7Z)
- 101 Dalmatian Street (Das Haus der 101 Dalmatiner)
- 101 Dalmatians: The Series (101 Dalmatiner)
- Ace Lightning
- A Kind of Magic (A Kind of Magic - Eine magische Familie)
- Aladdin
- Alex & Co.
- American Dragon: Jake Long (American Dragon)
- Amphibia
- Andi Mack (Story of Andi)
- A.N.T. Farm (A.N.T.: Achtung Natur-Talente)
- Arthur and the Invisibles (Arthur und die Minimoys)
- Atomic Betty
- Austin & Ally
- As the Bell Rings (Endlich Pause!)
- The Adventures of Swiss Family Robinson (Die Robinsons – Aufbruch ins Ungewisse)
- Backstage
- Bear in the Big Blue House (Der Bär im großen blauen Haus)
- Best Bugs Forever (Käfer-City)
- Best Friends Whenever (Best Friends - Zu jeder Zeit)
- Big Hero 6 (Baymax – Robowabohu in Serie)
- Bizaardvark
- The Basil Brush Show (Die Basil Brush Show)
- Benjamin Blümchen
- Bob the Builder (Bob der Baumeister)
- Bonkers (Bonkers, der listige Luchs von Hollywood)
- The Book of Pooh (Winnie Puuhs Bilderbuch)
- Boyster
- Brandy & Mr. Whiskers
- Bunk'd (Camp Kikiwaka)
- Bunnytown (Hoppelhausen)
- Buzz Lightyear of Star Command (Captain Buzz Lightyear – Star Command)
- The Buzz on Maggie (Maggie)
- Caitlin's Way (Caitlin)
- Captain Flamingo
- Cars on the Road
- Cars Toons (Cars Toons – Hooks unglaubliche Geschichten)
- Chiamatemi Giò (Hey, Gio!)
- Chip 'n Dale: Rescue Rangers (Chip und Chap – Die Ritter des Rechts)
- Cloudy with a Chance of Meatballs (Wolkig mit Aussicht auf Fleischbällchen)
- Cory in the House (Einfach Cory!)
- Connie the Cow (Connie, der kleine Kuh)
- Committed (Committed – Eine Mutter steht Kopf)
- Crash & Bernstein
- Crash Zone (Crash Zone – Das Computer-Team)
- Darkwing Duck
- Dave the Barbarian (Barbaren-Dave)
- Descendants: Wicked World (Descendants – Verhexte Welt)
- Dinosaurs (Die Dinos)
- Dinosaur Train (Dino Zug)
- Doc McStuffins (Doc McStuffins, Spielzeugärztin)
- Dog with a Blog (Hund mit Blog)
- Doug
- Dragon (Dragon – Der kleine blaue Drache)
- Dreamkix (Dreamkix - Die tierische Elf)
- DuckTales (DuckTales – Neues aus Entenhausen)
- Elena of Avalor (Elena von Avalor)
- Eliot Kid (Eliot)
- The Emperor's New School (Kuzcos Königsklasse)
- Endangered Species (Voll verrückte Viecher)
- Even Stevens (Eben ein Stevens)
- Evermoor
- The Fairly OddParents (Cosmo und Wanda – Wenn Elfen helfen)
- Fairy Tale Police Department (F.T.P.D. – Die Märchenpolizei)
- Famous 5: On the Case (Fünf Freunde – Für alle Fälle)
- The Famous Jett Jackson (Jett Jackson)
- Fillmore!
- Fish Hooks (Der Fisch-Club)
- Frozen: Northern Lights (Die Eiskönigin: Zauber der Polarlichter)
- Franny's Feet (Frannys Wunderschuhe)
- Girl Meets World (Das Leben und Riley)
- Go Away, Unicorn! (Immer dieses Einhorn)
- Goldie & Bear (Goldie und Bär)
- Goof Troop (Goofy und Max)
- Guardians of the Galaxy
- Handy Manny (Meister Manny's Werkzeugkiste)
- Hannah Montana
- Harry and His Bucket Full of Dinosaurs (Harry und sein Eimer voller Dinos)
- Have a Laugh! (Kicherkracher)
- Henry Hugglemonster (Henry Knuddelmonster)
- Hercules
- Higglytown Heroes (Higglystadt Helden)
- The Hive (Summ, summ, super!)
- Honey, I Shrunk the Kids: The TV Show (Liebling, ich habe die Kinder geschrumpft)
- House of Mouse (Mickys Clubhaus)
- I Didn't Do It (Ich war's nicht)
- Imagination Movers (Die Ideen-Meister)
- In a Heartbeat (Heartbeat)
- I.N.K. Invisible Network of Kids (I.N.K.)
- Jake & Blake
- Jake and the Never Land Pirates (Jake und die Nimmerland-Piraten)
- The Jersey (Trikot der Champions)
- Jessie
- Jim Button (Jim Knopf)
- Jonas Brothers: Living the Dream (Jonas Brothers – Eine Band lebt ihren Traum)
- Jonas L.A.
- JoJo's Circus (Jojos Zirkus)
- Johnny and the Sprites (Johnny und die Sprites)
- Julius Jr.
- Jungle Cubs (Die Dschungelbuch-Kids)
- Jungle Junction (Dschungel, Dschungel!)
- Justin Time (Der Phantastische Paul)
- K.C. Undercover
- Kickin' It (Karate-Chaoten)
- Kick Buttowski: Suburban Daredevil (Kick Buttowski - Keiner kann alles)
- Kikoumba: Crown Down! (Kikoumba – Her mit der Krone!)
- Kim Possible
- Kirby: Right Back at Ya! (Kirby)
- Kung Fu Panda: The Paws of Destiny (Kung Fu Panda – Die Tatzen des Schicksals)
- Lab Rats (S3 – Stark, schnell, schlau)
- The Land Before Time (In einem Land vor unserer Zeit)
- Lanfeust Quest (Lanfeust)
- Legend of the Three Caballeros (Die Legende der Drei Caballeros)
- Legends of the Ring of Fire (Legenden aus dem Ring des Feuers)
- The Legend of Tarzan (Tarzan)
- Lego Friends: The Next Chapter (Friends: Das nächste Kapitel)
- Lego Marvel Super Heroes: Maximum Overload (Marvel Super Heroes-Maximale Superkräfte)
- Lego Star Wars: Droid Tales (Lego Star Wars: Die Droiden Story)
- Lego Star Wars: The Freemaker Adventures (Star Wars: Die Abenteuer der Freemaker)
- Leon
- Life with Derek (Mensch Derek!)
- Lilo & Stitch: The Series (Lilo & Stitch)
- Li'l Horrors (Little Horrors)
- The Lion Guard (Die Garde der Löwen)
- Little Einsteins (Kleine Einsteins)
- The Little Mermaid (Arielle, die Meerjungfrau)
- Liv and Maddie
- Lizzie McGuire
- Lloyd in Space (Lloyd im All)
- The Lodge
- Lost in Oz
- Lucky Fred
- Maggie & Bianca: Fashion Friends
- The Magic School Bus (Der Zauberschulbus)
- Mama Mirabelle's Home Movies (Mama Mirabelles Tierkino)
- Matt's Monsters (Matzes Monster)
- Max & Ruby
- Meg and Mog (Meg und Mog)
- Men in Black: The Series (Men in Black: Die Serie)
- Meteor and the Mighty Monster Trucks (Meteor, der kleine Monstertruck)
- Mickey Mouse Works (Neue Micky Maus Geschichten)
- Mighty Ducks: The Animated Series (Mighty Ducks – Das Powerteam)
- Mighty Med (Mighty Med – Wir heilen Helden)
- Miles from Tomorrowland (Miles von Morgen)
- Mush-Mush and the Mushables (Flipi und die Pilzlinge)
- The Mummy (Die Mumie – Das Geheimnis der Mumie)
- Muppet Babies
- My Babysitter's a Vampire (Mein Babysitter ist ein Vampir)
- My Dad the Rock Star (Mein Dad ist’n Rockstar)
- My Friends Tigger & Pooh (Meine Freunde Tigger und Puuh)
- My Little Pony: Equestria Girls
- My Little Pony: Friendship Is Magic (My Little Pony - Freundschaft ist Magie)
- My Little Pony: Pony Life
- My Parents Are Aliens (Meine Eltern, die Aliens)
- The New Adventures of Winnie the Pooh (Neue Abenteuer mit Winnie Puuh)
- Nouky & Friends (Nouky und seine Freunde)
- Odd Family (Zwillinge auf Zack)
- Octonauts (Die Oktonauten)
- Oggy and the Cockroaches (Oggy und die Kakerlaken)
- O11CE (11)
- Our Gang (Die kleinen Strolche)
- Overruled! (Jared 'Coop' Cooper – Highschoolanwalt)
- The Owl House (Willkommen im Haus der Eulen)
- Ozie Boo!
- Packages from Planet X (Paket von X)
- Pac-Man and the Ghostly Adventures (Pac-Man und die Geisterabenteuer)
- Pair of Kings (Pair of Kings - Die Königsbrüder)
- Pat the Dog (Pat der Hund)
- Parker Lewis Can't Lose (Parker Lewis – Der Coole von der Schule)
- PB&J Otter (PB&J Otter – Die Rasselbande vom Hoohaw-See)
- Pepper Ann
- Phil of the Future (Phil aus der Zukunft)
- Pinky Dinky Doo
- Pippi Langstrumpf
- The Powerpuff Girls (Die Powerpuff Girls)
- Pound Puppies (Pound Puppies – Der Pfotenclub)
- The Proud Family (Die Prouds)
- The Psammy Show (Die Psammy Show)
- Puppy Dog Pals (Welpen Freunde)
- Pucca
- Quack Pack (Quack Pack – Onkel D. und die Boys)
- Rainbow Fish (Der Regenbogenfisch)
- Randy Cunningham: 9th Grade Ninja (Randy Cunningham: Der Ninja aus der 9. Klasse)
- Recess (Große Pause)
- The Replacements (Tauschrausch)
- Rolie Polie Olie
- Rolling with the Ronks! (Ronks – Keine Steinzeit ohne Alien!)
- Round the Twist (Twist total – Eine australische Familie legt los)
- Royal Ranch
- Rugrats
- Sabrina: The Animated Series (Simsalabim Sabrina)
- Sabrina: Secrets of a Teenage Witch (Sabrina – Verhext nochmal!)
- Sadie Sparks (Gilbert und Sadie)
- Sally Bollywood: Super Detective
- Sandra the Fairytale Detective (Sandra & Ko – Die Märchendetektive)
- Scaredy Squirrel (Eddie Angsthorn)
- The Secret World of Alex Mack (Was ist los mit Alex Mack?)
- The Secret Show (Die Top Secret Show)
- Sheriff Callie's Wild West (Sheriff Callie's wilder Westen)
- Shake It Up (Shake It Up – Tanzen ist alles)
- Shorty McShorts' Shorts (Die Shorty McShort Show)
- Sister, Sister
- The Smurfs (Die Schlümpfe)
- Sonny with a Chance (Sonny Munroe)
- So Weird (Fionas Website)
- Soy Luna
- SpangaS (Spangas – Das ist das Leben)
- Special Agent Oso (Spezialagent Oso)
- Staines Down Drains (Fleckgeflutscht!)
- Stanley
- Star vs. the Forces of Evil (Star gegen die Mächte des Bösen)
- Star Wars Forces of Destiny (Star Wars: Die Mächte des Schicksals)
- Star Wars Rebels
- Stitch! (Yuna & Stitch)
- Stuck in the Middle (Mittendrin und kein Entkommen)
- Student Bodies
- Super 4: Heroes United (Super 4)
- The Super Hero Squad Show
- Tales of Friendship with Winnie the Pooh (Freundschafts-Geschichten mit Winnie Puuh)
- TaleSpin (Käpt’n Balu und seine tollkühne Crew)
- Tara Duncan
- Teacher's Pet (Klassenhund)
- Teamo Supremo
- This is Daniel Cook (Hier ist Daniel Cook)
- That's So Raven (Raven blickt durch)
- Timon & Pumbaa (Abenteuer mit Timon und Pumbaa)
- Totally Spies!
- T.O.T.S.
- Toy Story Toons
- Trotro
- Tsum Tsum
- Tupu (Tupu – Das wilde Mädchen aus dem Central Park)
- Tutenstein
- Ultimate Spider-Man (Der ultimative Spider-Man)
- Vampirina
- Vicky the Viking (Wickie und die starken Männer)
- Viking Skool (Wikinger-Schule)
- Violetta
- Walk the Prank (Schreck-Attack)
- Wander Over Yonder (Sie nannten ihn Wander)
- Walt Disney Cartoon Classics (Disneys Classic Cartoon)
- Walt Disney's Wonderful World of Color (Walt Disneys bunte Welt)
- The Weekenders (Wochenend-Kids)
- We Bear Bears (We Bare Bears – Bären wie wir)
- Wizards of Waverly Place (Die Zauberer vom Waverly Place)
- Woofy
- Zeke and Luther (Zeke und Luther)
- The ZhuZhus
- Zombie Hotel (Grufthotel Grabesruh)
- Zou (Zeo)

=== Primetime ===
- 8 Simple Rules (Meine wilden Töchter)
- Atelier Fontana - Le sorelle della moda (Atelier Fontana)
- Baby Daddy
- Blossom
- Boy Meets World (Das Leben und Ich)
- Brotherly Love (Wilde Brüder mit Charme!)
- Buffy the Vampire Slayer
- Bunheads (New in Paradise)
- Cedar Cove (Cedar Cove – Das Gesetz des Herzens)
- Chasing Life
- Clueless (Clueless – Die Chaos-Clique)
- The Conners (Die Conners)
- Desperate Housewives
- Dharma & Greg (Dharma und Greg)
- El Dorado
- Everwood
- Everybody Loves Raymond (Alle lieben Raymond)
- Finding Carter
- The Flintstones (Familie Feuerstein)
- The Fosters
- Friends
- Galavant
- Gargoyles (Gargoyles - Auf den Schwingen der Gerechtigkeit)
- Gilmore Girls
- The Goldbergs (Die Goldbergs)
- The Golden Palace (Golden Palace)
- Gran Hotel (Grand Hotel)
- Hindsight
- Jane by Design
- Life Unexpected (Life Unexpected - Plötzlich Familie)
- Little House on the Prairie (Unsere kleine Farm)
- The Lying Game
- Mad About You (Verrückt nach Dir)
- Men in Trees
- Miranda
- The Munsters Today (Familie Munster)
- The Muppet Show (Die Muppet Show)
- The Musketeers (Die Musketiere)
- The Nanny (Die Nanny)
- The Neighbors
- New Girl
- Once Upon a Time (Once Upon a Time – Es war einmal ...)
- Pushing Daisies
- Remington Steele
- Roseanne
- Sabrina the Teenage Witch (Sabrina – total verhext!)
- Scrubs (Scrubs – Die Anfänger)
- Seed
- Smart Guy
- Star-Crossed
- Suburgatory
- Switched at Birth
- Teen Angel
- This Is Us (This Is Us – Das ist Leben)
- White Collar
- My Wife and Kids (What's Up, Dad?)
