= List of programs broadcast by MBC 3 =

This is a list of programs broadcast by MBC 3. Many of its programs are sourced from various sources, including Disney, Cartoon Network and Nickelodeon. Alongside Japanese and Korean Animation, and original Arabic animated TV series.

== Programs ==
=== Original productions ===
- Best stories (أحسن القصص; ahsan alqisas)
- Connection (تواصل; tawāṣul)
- Dania Ali Al-Hawa (دانية علي الهوا)
- Do you know (هل تعلم; Hal Ta'lam)
- The Science Experiment (التجربة; at-tajrubah)
- Fawazeer Ramadan (فوازير رمضان; fawazir ramadan) (It's also Connexion (تواصل; tawāṣul), but in the Islamic month of Ramadan, it shows quizzes called Fawazeer (فوازير; fawazeer) (Singular: Fawazeer (فزورة; fazoorah)))
- Girl Power (بنات و بس; banāt w bass)
- Haseeb in the World of Numbers (حسيب في عالم الأرقام; haseeb fi a'am al'arqam)
- Hi Tech (هاي تيك; hai tek)
- Kingdom cities (مدن المملكة; mudun almammlakah)
- Lantern Tales (قنديل الحكايات; qandil alhikayat)
- Live Safari (عيش سفاري; ‘īch safārī)
- Men around the prophet Muhamed SAWS (رجال حول الرسول; rigal hawl alrasul)
- Our friends (اصدقائنا; asdiqaʿna)
- The Parrot Learns The Hardest Quiz (الببغاء يتعلم الهجاء; babaghah yata'alam alhiga)
- Soccer Academy (سوكر أكاديمي; sūcker akādimī)
- Soft Steps (خطوات ناعمة; khutuwat naʿma)
- Sweetest World Games (تسالي أحلى عالم; tisālī aḥlà ‘ālam)
- Telescope (تيليسكوب; tīlīskūb)
- Tell Me Why (ڨولولي ليش; gūlūlī līsh)
- Think It's Right? (فكرها صح؟; fakirhā ṣaḥ?)
- Together In... (سوا في…; sawà fìl...)
- Sesame Street (أهلا سمسم; Ahlan Simsim)
- What do you cook, Dania? (إيش طابخين يا دانية; Ish ṭabikhayn ya daniya)
- Where do we go? (فين حنروح; fein ḥanraweh)
- Little Big Stars (نجوم صغار; Nogoum Sghar)
- The Voice Kids (أحلى صوت; Ahla Sawt; Best Voice)
- Shebl Alqaseed (شبل القصيد)
- H2O

=== Children's programming ===
- 64 Zoo Lane
- The 99
- The Adventures of Tintin
- The Amazing Spiez!
- Agent 203
- Angela Anaconda
- Angelo Rules
- A.T.O.M.
- Atomic Betty
- Avengers Assemble
- The Avengers: Earth's Mightiest Heroes
- Back to Back
- Back to the Future
- Barney & Friends
- Being Ian
- Bernard
- Big Blue
- Binka
- Bob the Builder
- BoBoiBoy Galaxy
- Boj
- Booba
- Boohbah
- Boy and Dragon
- Boy Girl Dog Cat Mouse Cheese
- Braceface
- The Brothers Flub
- Bubble Bip
- Bubble's Hotel
- Captain Biceps
- Captain Flamingo
- Carl²
- Champies
- Chaotic
- Charley Goes to School
- Chloe's Closet
- Chris Colorado
- Chronokids
- Chuck's Choice
- Chuck Chicken
- Clang Invasion
- Cleo & Cuquin
- Coach Me If You Can
- Cocomelon
- Code Lyoko
- Codename: Kids Next Door
- Combo Niños
- Commander Clark
- Corneil & Bernie
- Courage the Cowardly Dog
- The Cramp Twins
- Cuby Zoo
- Curious George
- Cyberchase
- The Daltons
- Dan Dare: Pilot of the Future
- Danger Mouse
- Danny & Daddy
- The DaVincibles
- The Deep
- Dennis and Gnasher
- Dennis the Menace and Gnasher
- Di-Gata Defenders
- Dino City
- DinoCore
- Doby & Disy
- Dogmatix and the Indomitables
- Dragon Force
- Dragon Force: Dragon Soul Awakens
- Duck Dodgers
- Edgar & Ellen
- Egyxos
- Electroboy
- Eliot Kid
- Exo-Squad
- Extreme Football
- The Fairytaler
- Fangbone!
- Fimbles
- Fix & Foxi and Friends
- Floogals
- FloopaLoo, Where Are You?
- Flying Rhino Junior High
- Fraggle Rock
- Franny's Feet
- Fruity Robo
- Furiki Wheels
- Fulla princess of wishes (Arabic adaption of Secret Jouju)
- Fananees
- Galactic Agency
- Galactik Football
- The Garfield Show
- Gasp!
- George of the Jungle
- Get Ace
- G.I. Joe: Renegades
- Gladiator Academy
- The Gnoufs
- Gormiti
- Gormiti
- Grosha & Mr B.
- Growing Up Creepie
- Guardians of the Galaxy
- Harry & Bunnie
- Harry and His Bucket Full of Dinosaurs
- Hero: 108
- Hero Circle
- Hero Dad
- Hero Kids
- Hot Wheels Battle Force 5
- Hoze Houndz
- Hulk and the Agents of S.M.A.S.H.
- I.N.K. Invisible Network of Kids
- Iron Man: Armored Adventures
- Jackie Chan Adventures
- Jar Dwellers SOS
- Jimmy Two-Shoes
- Jorel's Brother
- Jumanji
- The Karate Kid
- Kate & Mim-Mim
- Kid vs. Kat
- The Kids from Room 402
- Kikoriki
- Kikoumba Crown Down!
- A Kind of Magic
- Kobushi
- Kody Kapow
- Kong: The Animated Series
- Kuu Kuu Harajuku
- LazyTown
- League of Super Evil
- The Legendaries
- Life with Louie
- Lilybuds
- Little Furry
- Little Princess
- Little Tiaras
- Littlest Pet Shop
- Lola & Virginia
- Looped
- Lottie Dottie
- Love Monster
- Lucky Fred
- Mademoiselle Zazie
- Mansour
- Marblegen
- Martin Mystery
- Masha and the Bear
- Max Steel
- Men in Black
- Mechamato
- MeteoHeroes
- Mimi and Mr. Bobo
- Miraculous: Tales of Ladybug & Cat Noir
- Mironins
- Miss Spider's Sunny Patch Friends
- Mission Odyssey
- Mirette Investigates
- Monsikids
- MP4ORCE: Beyond Real
- Mr. Bean: The Animated Series
- Mr. Carton
- The Mummy
- Munki and Trunk
- The New Woody Woodpecker Show
- Niloya
- Norman Normal
- Oggy and the Cockroaches
- Onn - Off
- Oscar's Oasis
- Osmar: The Heel of the Loaf
- The Owl
- The Owl & Co
- Pablo the Little Red Fox
- Pac-Man and the Ghostly Adventures
- Paper Port
- Paprika
- Peanuts
- Peep and the Big Wide World
- Peg + Cat
- Percy's Tiger Tales
- Petronix Defenders
- Pfffirates
- Pigeon Boy
- The Pink Panther
- The Pink Panther Show
- Pinky Dinky Doo
- PINY: Institute of New York
- Pippi Longstocking
- PJ Masks
- Plankton Invasion
- The Pooches
- Pocoyo
- PopPixie
- Postcards from Buster
- Postman Pat
- Princesse Shéhérazade
- Project G.e.e.K.e.R.
- Pumpkin Reports
- Robotboy
- Rainbow Rangers
- Rat-A-Tat
- Ratz
- Rated A for Awesome
- Ready Jet Go!
- The Real Ghostbusters
- Regal Academy
- Rob the Robot
- RollBots
- Ruby Gloom
- Sabrina: The Animated Series
- Salty's Lighthouse
- The Save-Ums!
- Scary Larry
- Scruff
- The Secret Saturdays
- The Secret Show
- Sendokai Champions
- Shasha & Milo
- Shaun the Sheep
- Sherwood
- Simsala Grimm
- Skunk Fu!
- Slugterra
- S.M.A.S.H!
- Space Nova
- Snailsbury Tales
- Snohy
- The Spectacular Spider-Man
- Speed Racer: The Next Generation
- Spider-Man
- Spirou et Fantasio
- The Spooktacular New Adventures of Casper
- Star Wars Rebels
- Stella and Sam
- Street Football
- Stuart Little: The Animated Series
- Sunny Bunnies
- The Super Hero Squad Show
- Super Robot Monkey Team Hyperforce Go!
- Super Spin Combiner
- Super Wings
- Supa Strikas
- Sweet Little Monsters
- Talking Tom & Friends
- Tara Duncan: The Evil Empress
- Tasty Tales of the Food Truckers
- Tayo The Little Bus
- Team Galaxy
- Teo
- Thomas & Friends
- Thunderbirds Are Go
- Thunder Machines
- The Tofus
- Totally Spies!
- Transformers: Rescue Bots
- Treasure Trekkers
- Trulli Tales
- Tweenies
- Turbo Fast
- Turtle Island
- Ultimate Spider-Man
- Unite 2 Blast
- Urban Vermin
- Walter Melon
- What's with Andy?
- Wheel Squad
- Wicked
- Wimzie's House
- WinneToons
- Wing Commander Academy
- Winston Steinburger and Sir Dudley Ding Dong
- Wissper
- W.I.T.C.H.
- Wolverine and the X-Men
- X-Men: Evolution
- Yakari
- Yin Yang Yo!
- Yoho Ahoy
- Yo Gabba Gabba!
- Zaki Adventures
- Zevo-3
- Zombie Hotel

=== From Disney ===
- Aladdin
- American Dragon: Jake Long
- The Book of Pooh
- Brandy & Mr. Whiskers
- Buzz Lightyear of Star Command
- The Buzz on Maggie
- Dave the Barbarian
- Doug
- DuckTales
- The Emperor's New School
- Fish Hooks
- Handy Manny
- Higglytown Heroes
- House of Mouse
- Jake and the Never Land Pirates
- JoJo's Circus
- Jungle Junction
- Kick Buttowski: Suburban Daredevil
- Kim Possible
- The Legend of Tarzan
- Little Einsteins
- Lloyd in Space
- Mickey Mouse Clubhouse
- My Friends Tigger & Pooh
- The New Adventures of Winnie the Pooh
- PB&J Otter
- Phineas and Ferb
- Quack Pack
- Recess
- The Replacements
- Special Agent Oso
- Stanley
- Teacher's Pet
- Timon & Pumbaa
- The Weekenders

=== From Warner Bros. ===
- Looney Tunes
- Animaniacs
- Baby Looney Tunes
- The Batman
- Batman: The Animated Series
- Batman: The Brave and the Bold
- Beware the Batman
- Duck Dodgers
- Freakazoid!
- Green Lantern
- Loonatics Unleashed
- Merrie Melodies
- Scooby-Doo! Mystery Incorporated
- Static Shock
- The Sylvester & Tweety Mysteries
- Taz-Mania
- Teen Titans
- Teen Titans
  - Teen Titans Go!
- Tom and Jerry (2005-2015)
  - Tom and Jerry Tales
  - The Tom and Jerry Show
- What's New, Scooby-Doo?
- Xiaolin Showdown
- Young Justice
- The Zeta Project

=== From Hanna-Barbera ===
- The Jetsons
- Scooby-Doo, Where Are You!
- Dexter's Laboratory
- The Powerpuff Girls

=== From Cartoon Network Studios ===
- Samurai Jack
- The Grim Adventures of Billy & Mandy
- Foster's Home for Imaginary Friends
- Camp Lazlo
- The Life and Times of Juniper Lee
- Ben 10
- Chowder
- Ben 10: Alien Force
- The Marvelous Misadventures of Flapjack
- Grim & evil

=== From Nickelodeon ===
- Blaze and the Monster Machines
- Rocket Power
- Back at the Barnyard
- Get Blake!
- Bunsen Is a Beast
- SpongeBob SquarePants
- Kamp Koral: SpongeBob's Under Years
- Winx Club
- The X's
- Danny Phantom
- Welcome to the Wayne
- Planet Sheen
- CatDog
- The Loud House
- The Legend of Korra
- The Fairly OddParents
- Dora the Explorer
- Fanboy & Chum Chum
- T.U.F.F. Puppy
- Invader Zim
- PAW Patrol
- ChalkZone
- Catscratch
- Kung Fu Panda: Legends of Awesomeness
- The Penguins of Madagascar
- It's Pony
- Top Wing
- Team Umizoomi
- Hey Arnold!
- The Adventures of Jimmy Neutron, Boy Genius
- Robot and Monster
- Sunny Day
- Blue's Clues
- Monsters vs. Aliens
- Bubble Guppies
- Harvey Beaks
- The Mighty B!
- The Casagrandes
- Teenage Mutant Ninja Turtles (2012 TV series)
- My Life as a Teenage Robot
- Rise of the Teenage Mutant Ninja Turtles
- Shimmer and Shine
- As Told by Ginger
- Regal Academy
- Rabbids Invasion
- Rugrats

=== Japanese and Korean programming ===
- Astro Boy
- Bernard
- Blue Dragon
- Captain Tsubasa
- Cyborg 009
- Digimon Adventure
- Digimon Adventure 02
- Digimon Tamers
- Digimon Frontier
- Digimon Fusion
- Dinosaur King
- Gallery Fake
- Go for Speed
- Infinity Nado
- MegaMan NT Warrior
- Ōban Star-Racers
- Shaman King
- Sonic X
- Spider Riders
- Tenkai Knights
- Victory Kickoff!!
- Yu-Gi-Oh!
- Yu-Gi-Oh! GX
- Yu-Gi-Oh! 5D's
- Yu-Gi-Oh! Zexal
- Yu-Gi-Oh! Arc-V
- Yu-Gi-Oh! VRAINS
- Blazing Teens (seasons 3-4)

== Special events ==
=== Past special events ===
- The Voice Kids Tour
- The Voice Kids - Ahla Sahra (أحلى سهرة)

== Films ==
=== Nickelodeon children's films ===
- Albert
- Hey Arnold!: The Jungle Movie
- Lucky
- Blue's Big City Adventure
- SpongeBob SquarePants Presents The Tidal Zone
- Baby Shark's Big Movie!
- No Time to Spy: A Loud House Movie
