= Woofy =

French-Canadian animated television series

- Genre: Animated sitcom
- Created by: Alexandre Révérend
- Directed by: Dominique Etchecopar
- Voices of: Laurent-Christophe de Ruelle; François-Nicolas Dolan; Rafaëlle Leiris; Jean-François Beaupré; Rosemarie Houde; Aline Pinsonneault
- Theme music composer: Laurent Aknin
- Opening theme: "Woofy's Song" (French: "Chanson de Woofy") performed by François-Nicolas Dolan (French): Sonja Ball (English)
- Ending theme: "Woofy's Song" (French: "Chanson de Woofy") (instrumental)
- Composer: Laurent Aknin
- Countries of origin: France; Canada
- Original language: French
- No. of episodes: 65

Production
- Producers: Christian Davin (Note: Christian Davin, Clément Calvet, and Paul Cadieux are credited as producers on the original French production, and as executive producers on the English dub.); Clément Calvet; Paul Cadieux
- Animators: Fantasia Animation, Ltd.
- Editor: Lysanne Villeneuve (Note: Lysanne Villeneuve served as picture editor on the original French version, and as editor on the English dub.)
- Running time: 5–6 minutes
- Production companies: Alphanim; Tooncan Productions XXV inc.

Original release
- Network: France 5 (France); Télévision de Radio-Canada (Canada)
- Release: 13 November 2004 – 15 February 2005

Woofy is a French-Canadian animated television series created by Alexandre Révérend and directed by Dominique Etchecopar. Consisting of 65 five or six-minute episodes, the series was co-produced by animation studios Alphanim and Tooncan Productions XXV, inc. in association with France 5.

== Premise ==
The series revolves around Woofy, a stray dog adopted by a four-year-old boy named Anthony (French: Antoine). Because Anthony's mother forbids pets in the household, Anthony pretends that Woofy is a plush toy won at a school fair. Woofy maintains a secret life whenever adults are not looking, leading to comedic situations as he and Anthony attempt to conceal his true identity.

== Voice cast & crew ==
=== French voice cast ===
- Laurent-Christophe de Ruelle as Woofy
- François-Nicolas Dolan as Antoine
- Rafaëlle Leiris as Antoine's Mother
- Jean-François Beaupré as Antoine's Father
- Rosemarie Houde as Muriel
- Aline Pinsonneault as Rémi

=== French crew ===
- François Sasseville – Voice Director

=== English cast ===
- Thor Bishopric as Woofy
- Aaron Grunfeld as Anthony (French: Antoine)
- Jane Wheeler as Anthony's Mother
- Mark Camacho as Anthony's Father
- Sonja Ball as Marina (French: Marine)
- Eleanor Noble as Bobby (French: Rémi)
- Bailey Stocker as Muriel

=== English crew ===
- Terrence Scammell – Voice Director

=== Voice recording ===
- Joe Petrella – Voice Recording
- Louis-Gabriel Pothier – Voice Recording

== Music ==
The series score was composed by Laurent Aknin. The opening theme song, titled "Chanson de Woofy" in French and "Woofy's Song" in English, was written by Alexandre Révérend with music by Laurent Aknin and performed by François-Nicolas Dolan in French and Sonja Ball in English. The ending theme consists of an instrumental version of the score.

== Production and crew ==
The series was created by Alexandre Révérend, who also served as a writer alongside Valérie Baranski, Manon and Muguette Berthelet, Michel Coulon, Frédéric Révérend, Nathalie Reznikoff, Frédéric Sabrou and Nicolas Verpilleux. The series was directed by Dominique Etchecopar with an original score composed by Laurent Aknin.

== Episodes ==
The series premiered in France on 13 November 2004 on France 5 and in Canada on Télévision de Radio-Canada on 26 July 2005. It consists of 65 five or six-minute episodes.

No.	French title	English title	Written by	Original release date	Canadian air date
1	"Woofy a peur du noir"	"Woofy is Scared of the Dark"	Alexandre Révérend	13 November 2004	26 July 2005
2	"Woofy ne veut pas obéir"	"Woofy Rebels"	Michel Coulon	15 November 2004	26 July 2005
3	"Woofy prétend être malade"	"Woofy Pretends to Be Sick"	Alexandre Révérend	16 November 2004	26 July 2005
4	"Woofy croit aux sorcières"	"Woofy Believes in Witches"	Frédéric Révérend	17 November 2004	27 July 2005
5	"Woofy a le hoquet"	"Woofy Has Hiccups"	Alexandre Révérend	18 November 2004	27 July 2005
6	"Woofy ne veut pas s'excuser"	"Woofy Won't Say Sorry"	Alexandre Révérend	27 November 2004	27 July 2005
7	"Woofy combat l'injustice"	"Woofy Fights Unfairness"	Michel Coulon	23 November 2004	28 July 2005
8	"Woofy n'ose pas se dénoncer"	"Woofy Doesn't Dare Own Up"	Michel Coulon	19 November 2004	28 July 2005
9	"Woofy s'oublie la nuit"	"Woofy Wets His Bed"	Michel Coulon	20 November 2004	28 July 2005
10	"Woofy ne veut pas rendre les lunettes"	"Woofy Won't Give the Glasses Back"	Frédéric Sabrou	22 November 2004	29 July 2005
11	"Woofy et le faux doudou"	"Woofy and the Fake Cuddly"	Nathalie Reznikoff	29 November 2004	29 July 2005
12	"Woofy a été repéré"	"Woofy Gets Caught"	Michel Coulon	30 November 2004	29 July 2005
13	"Woofy ne veut pas rester seul"	"Dogged by School"	Frédéric Sabrou	2 December 2004	1 August 2005
14	"Woofy fait un cauchemar"	"A Dog's Best Friend"	Frédéric Sabrou	24 November 2004	1 August 2005
15	"Woofy n'est pas Woofy"	"Mistaken Dogdentit"	Nathalie Reznikoff	25 November 2004	1 August 2005
16	"Woofy et les allergies"	"Friends Furever"	Alexandre Révérend	3 December 2004	2 August 2005
17	"Woofy veut redevenir un chien"	"Ruff and Lonely Days"	Alexandre Révérend	26 November 2004	2 August 2005
18	"Woofy a-t-il du flair ?"	"Flair and Flair Alike"	Frédéric Sabrou	21 December 2004	2 August 2005
19	"Woofy a des puces"	"Flea, Fly, Flow, Fun"	Manon & Muguette Berthelet	4 December 2004	3 August 2005
20	"Woofy a été filmé"	"Dog Lies and Videotape"	Frédéric Sabrou	8 December 2004	3 August 2005
21	"Woofy et le grenouille"	"Jumping to Croaklusions"	Manon & Muguette Berthelet	9 December 2004	3 August 2005
22	"Woofy veut une lettre"	"Woofy's Got Mail!"	Nathalie Reznikoff	1 December 2004	4 August 2005
23	"Woofy s'empâte"	"Weight for Woofy"	Alexandre Révérend	30 December 2004	4 August 2005
24	"Woofy et le cirque"	"Woofy and the Circus"	Manon & Muguette Berthelet	7 December 2004	4 August 2005
25	"Woofy et le bain"	"Woofy Takes a Bath"	Manon & Muguette Berthelet	31 December 2004	5 August 2005
26	"Woofy la marionnette"	"Woofy the Marionette"	Manon & Muguette Berthelet	10 December 2004	5 August 2005
27	"Woofy veut une niche"	"Doghouse Blues"	Manon & Muguette Berthelet	12 January 2005	5 August 2005
28	"Woofy craint d'être abandonné"	"Abandoned Woofy"	Alexandre Révérend	21 January 2005	8 August 2005
29	"Woofy et le manteau"	"Woofy and the Coat"	Nathalie Reznikoff	24 December 2004	8 August 2005
30	"Woofy veut tout avouer"	"Woofy Wants to Tell Everything"	Alexandre Révérend	11 December 2004	8 August 2005
31	"Woofy veut sortir seul"	"Woofy Wants to Out Alone"	Frédéric Sabrou	8 January 2005	9 August 2005
32	"Woofy donné aux œuvres"	"Woofy is Given to Charity"	Alexandre Révérend	13 January 2005	9 August 2005
33	"Woofy et le facteur"	"Woofy and the Mail Man"	Manon & Muguette Berthelet	22 December 2004	9 August 2005
34	"Woofy et le cadeau empoisonné"	"Woofy and the Poisoned Gift"	Valérie Baranski	13 December 2004	10 August 2005
35	"Woofy veut être méchant"	"Woofy Wants to Be Bad"	Valérie Baranski	23 December 2004	10 August 2005
36	"Woofy et la lampe de poche"	"Woofy and the Flashlight"	Manon & Muguette Berthelet	3 January 2005	10 August 2005
37	"Woofy est coincé"	"Woofy is Stuck"	Manon & Muguette Berthelet	1 January 2005	11 August 2005
38	"Woofy et la chasse au trésor"	"Woofy and the Treasure Hunt"	Manon & Muguette Berthelet	15 February 2005	11 August 2005
39	"Woofy veut être un héros"	"Woofy Wants to Be a Hero"	Valérie Baranski	29 December 2004	11 August 2005
40	"Woofy se fait hypnotiser"	"Woofy is Hypnotised"	Nicolas Verpilleux	14 January 2005	12 August 2005
41	"Woofy fait le beau"	"Woofy Facts the Beautiful One"	Nicolas Verpilleux	22 January 2005	12 August 2005
42	"Woofy perd une dent"	"Woofy Loses a Tooth"	Valérie Baranski	17 December 2004	12 August 2005
43	"Woofy est amoureux"	"Woofy in Love"	Alexandre Révérend	5 January 2005	15 August 2005
44	"Woofy a une écharde"	"Woofy Gets a Splinter"	Manon & Muguette Berthelet	20 January 2005	15 August 2005
45	"Woofy mène l'enquête"	"Woofy Investigates"	Manon & Muguette Berthelet	10 January 2005	15 August 2005
46	"Woofy le tricheur"	"Woofy Cheats"	Manon & Muguette Berthelet	18 December 2004	16 August 2005
47	"Woofy l'entraîneur"	"Woofy the Trainer"	Manon & Muguette Berthelet	11 January 2005	16 August 2005
48	"Woofy doit garder un secret"	"Woofy Keeps a Secret"	Nicolas Verpilleux	14 December 2004	16 August 2005
49	"Woofy va à l'école"	"Woofy Goes to School"	Nicolas Verpilleux	29 December 2004	17 August 2005
50	"Woofy veut son anniversaire"	"Woofy Wants a Birthday"	Alexandre Révérend	15 January 2005	17 August 2005
51	"Woofy se met à la peinture"	"Woofy Tries to Paint"	Valérie Baranski	18 January 2005	17 August 2005
52	"Woofy joue au bébé"	"Woofy Plays the Baby"	Manon & Muguette Berthelet	24 January 2005	18 August 2005
53	"Woofy et la pâte à modeler"	"Woofy and Plasticine"	Nicolas Verpilleux	15 December 2004	18 August 2005
54	"Woofy veut tout décider"	"Woofy Wants to Make All the Decisions"	Manon & Muguette Berthelet	6 January 2005	18 August 2005
55	"Woofy veut grandir"	"Woofy Wants to Grow Up"	Alexandre Révérend	20 December 2004	19 August 2005
56	"Woofy a une nouvelle maîtresse"	"Woofy Gets a New Mommy"	Nicolas Verpilleux	7 January 2005	19 August 2005
57	"Woofy dit le contraire"	"Woofy Says the Opposite"	Alexandre Révérend	27 January 2005	19 August 2005
58	"Woofy ne joue plus"	"Woofy Doesn't Want to Play"	Manon & Muguette Berthelet	28 January 2005	22 August 2005
59	"Woofy et la gourmandise"	"Woofy's Eyes Are Bigger Than His Stomach"	Manon & Muguette Berthelet	29 January 2005	22 August 2005
60	"Woofy veut tout acheter"	"Woofy Wants to Buy Everything"	Alexandre Révérend	31 January 2005	22 August 2005
61	"Woofy le gardien"	"Woofy the Guard Dog"	Manon & Muguette Berthelet	2 February 2005	23 August 2005
62	"Woofy n'est pas prêteur"	"Woofy Doesn't Want to Share"	Alexandre Révérend	25 January 2005	23 August 2005
63	"Woofy se confie"	"Woofy Confides"	Manon & Muguette Berthelet	26 January 2005	23 August 2005
64	"Woofy s'invente une autre vie"	"Woofy Invents Himself a New Life"	Alexandre Révérend	1 February 2005	24 August 2005
65	"Woofy apprend à être sage"	"Woofy Learns to Be Good"	Alexandre Révérend	19 January 2005	24 August 2005

== Broadcast ==
Woofy premiered on 13 November 2004 on France 5 during its Midi les Zouzous programming block, and was broadcast in Canada on Télévision de Radio-Canada. The series was subsequently distributed internationally to networks including TiJi and TV5Monde.
