= Zouzou =

Zouzou may refer to:

- Zouzou (model) (Danièle Ciarlet), model, actress and singer
- Zouzou (film), 1934 film directed by Marc Allégret
- Zouzous, a French children's programming block
