= Tupu (TV series) =

Canadian-French 2D animated television series

- Advertising logo: Tupu appears different from her normal appearance in the show
- Also known as: Toupou
- Created by: Pepper Sue; Elastik Jane
- Directed by: Xavier Giacometti
- Voices of: French: Lynda Harchoui; Gérard Surugue; Pierre Casanova; Véronique Augereau; Cathy Cerda; Maël Davan-Soulas; Pierre-François Pistorio; Brigitte Lecordier; Christophe Lemoine; English: Bailey Stocker; James Harbour; Mark Camacho; Mark Hauser; Sonja Ball; Harry Standjofski; Jennifer Seguin; Terrence Scammell
- Music by: Hervé Lavandier
- Opening theme: "Tupu! Tupu! Always on the Run" (French: "Toupou ! Toupou ! C'est la liberté") performed by Roddy and Lou Julienne (French): Catherine Miles (English)
- Countries of origin: France; Canada
- No. of episodes: 26

Production
- Executive producer: Marc du Pontavice
- Producer: Marc du Pontavice
- Editor: Patrick Ducruet
- Running time: 22 minutes
- Production companies: Xilam; Tooncan

Original release
- Network: France 3/Disney Channel (France); ZDF (Germany); Super Écran (Canada)
- Release: 18 April – 27 June 2005

Related
- Sally Bollywood: Super Detective

Tupu is a French and Canadian animated television series created by Pepper Sue and Elastik Jane, directed by Xavier Giacometti, and produced by Xilam and Tooncan. First broadcast in 2005, the series consists of 26 episodes.

The series follows Tupu, a semi-wild girl who has been raised in Central Park in New York City. She befriends Norton, the son of the city's mayor, and lives in the park with her squirrel companion, Whatzup. Their adventures frequently involve Shoobert "Shoobz", a Central Park caretaker who repeatedly tries to capture Tupu and prove that she exists.

== Overview ==
The series revolves around a semi-wild girl named Tupu. Tupu is similar and reminiscent of Mowgli from The Jungle Book, although she retains manners and a basic understanding of English. Tupu lives with her friend, Whatzup, a squirrel, and also spends a lot of time with Norton. Tupu also had befriended all of the animals in the Central Park zoo. Norton lives with his father and has a privileged life, being chauffeured around town, especially to Central Park in a stretch limousine. Tupu is incessantly chased by the Central Park guard, Shoobert Shoobz, who makes every endeavor to prove her existence. Yet he keeps failing in catching her, and his unconfirmed claim that a wild girl hides in the park has led people to perceive him as deranged.

== Characters ==
=== Tupu ===
A barefoot wild girl who has been raised in Central Park and lives in the big oak tree. She gets along well with Norton and can speak to animals as well as understand them. She is often hunted by Shoobz, but always manages to elude capture. Tupu dislikes anyone who mistreats animals and nature. She is often accompanied by her squirrel friend, Whatzup. She is not known by anyone other than Shoobz or Norton. To everyone else she is just a normal girl from New York, only Norton really knows where she lives. Tupu's parents are never seen or mentioned and no explanation is given for their absence.

=== Norton ===
A happy-go-lucky young boy whose father is the mayor of New York City, and is best friends with Tupu. He is one of the few who know Tupu's secret. Norton wants to become an adventurer like his father and mother. Norton has an affaire with Tupu and in some chapters they are a couple.

=== Whatzup ===
Whatzup is Tupu's closest animal friend, is always seen with her, and comes to her aid when she is in trouble. Sometimes Tupu also has to help rescue Whatzup, but what are friends for? Whatzup sometimes is not with Tupu, when she is usually looking for food. Tupu and Whatzup share the same tree. Although he lives in Central Park, Whatzup is a ruddy European squirrel. His name is a pun on "What's Up?".

=== Shoobert ===
Shoobz (real name: Shoobert) is the caretaker of Central Park, and has made it his life goal to capture and prove the existence of Tupu. He lives with his overbearing mother.

== Cast ==
Character	French	English
Tupu	Lynda Harchaoui	Bailey Stocker
Norton	Pierre Casanova	James Harbour
Norton's mother	Véronique Augereau	Sonja Ball
Schubert Schoops	Gérard Surugue	
Miss Milleborne	Cathy Cerda	
Malcolm	Maël Davan-Soulas	
Mayor Bordon	Pierre-François Pistorio	
John	Brigitte Lecordier	
Benny	Christophe Lemoine	
Eddy	Christophe Lemoine	

== Episodes ==
No.	Title	Written by	Storyboard by	Australian air date	French air date
1	"Members Only" "Bienvenue au club !"	Johanna Stein; Adapted by : Pepper Sue and Elastik Jane	Charles Vacuelle	21 April 2005	2 May 2005
Norton wants to be one of the cool dudes at school so gets Tupu to help with the tough initiation rites. Norton gets angry with Tupu and decides to do the last test alone: to find the silver Yoyo lost in the derelict merry-go-round.
2	"Old Dogs, New Tricks" "La dame aux pigeons"	Johanna Stein	Luc Blanchard	27 April 2005	23 June 2005
The pigeon lady has vanished! She is now staying in the rest home where Norton's uncle lives too! Tupu does not understand the notion of retirement and leads the residents on a wild expedition to make their dreams come true!
3	"It's a Hard Rock Life" "Un concert d'enfer"	Françoise Charpiat	Dorothée Robert	20 April 2005	14 June 2005
Tupu is woken up by incredible noise. Helicopters and laser beams fill the sky, and a huge crowd gathers in front of the building on the edge of the Park. A rock star called Zyzo Pozzy stands in spotlights and Tupu is horrified!
4	"V.I.P." "Une star à la maison"	Johanna Stein	Charles Vaucelle	12 April 2005	19 April 2005
It's a gala evening at the Bordens: The Mayor has invited Monty Frisco, teenage movie star, and his parents. What Norton expected to be disagreeable evening becomes a nightmare when Tupu turns up.
5	"First Steps on Stage" "Premiers pas sur scène"	Pierre Olivier	Luc Blanchard	11 April 2005	18 April 2005
Norton's class is going to perform "Roméo and Juliet" and their teacher casts Norton as Romeo to his dismay, and Sarah as Juliet, who is thrilled to bits. Tupu helps Norton get over his stage fright with a special shock treatment!
6	"One for All, All for One" "Un pour tous, tous pour un"	Paul Greenberg	Jean-Luc Abiven	19 April 2005	13 June 2005
Sport counts at Norton's school, and his results are really poor! The headmaster makes him join the gymnastics team. Tupu is mildly jealous until she joins the team as well - then nothing goes to plan!
7	"The Kangaroo" "Le kangourou"	Dennis Heaton	Jean-Pierre Barja and Charles Vaucelle	22 April 2005	3 May 2005
Tupu accidentally wrecks the decorations Norton made for the school Open Day. Hoping to patch things up with Norton, she sends her friend's pet female kangaroo to perform, however the animal escapes.
8	"Straight Down the Metal" "La règle du jeu"	Rob Hoegee Based on an Idea by: Johanna Stein	Dorothée Robert and Luc Blanchard	28 April 2005	29 April 2005
Norton gets a metal detector but gets into an argument with Tupu about how valuable the things they find are. Later Norton finds out that one of the things Tupu had was valuable, and he has to get it back.
9	"Monkey Business" "Singeries"	Pierre Olivier	Charles Vaucelle and Jean-Luc Abiven	26 April 2005	6 May 2005
A circus monkey, Tycoon, becomes lost in Central Park. He soon befriends Tupu and Norton, when he uses his ability of mimicking people in Norton's limo, he is driven to City Hall where Norton was to give a speech.
10	"The Hunt for Tupu" "La chasse à la Toupou"	Richard Elliott and Simon Racioppa	Yves Montagne and Luc Blanchard	15 April 2005	25 April 2005
Norton gets to help out a famous hunter, but has second thoughts when he finds out what he's hunting for.
11	"Baby John" "Bébé John"	Pierre Olivier	Dorothée Robert and Charles Vaucelle	25 April 2005	5 May 2005
Norton tries babysitting to earn extra pocket money, however with Baby John's continuous crying, Norton takes him to Tupu for help, however she suggests an assorted range of activities which Norton thinks of being too dangerous.
12	"Treetop Adventures" "Norton a le vertige"	Claude Chauvat and Michel Picard	Yves Montagne and Oumar N'Diaye	29 April 2005	27 June 2005
Shoobz tries to get the new treetop course built around the area where Tupu lives. Norton tries to stop it from happening, but then his dad wants him to participate in the course.
13	"The Right Number" "Le compte est bon"	Françoise Charpiat	Luc Blanchard	3 May 2005	9 May 2005
Norton volunteers to do a documentary about the number of animals in Central Park to impress his teacher. Shoobz thinks there are too many animals and tries to interfere.
14	"Tupu's New Friend" "Une amie pour Toupou"	Paul Greenberg	Dorothée Robert and Charles Vaucelle	13 April 2005	21 April 2005
Norton and Tupu realize that they are very different from each other, so Norton takes Tupu to the circus to help her find a new best friend who is just like her.
15	"Home Sweet Home" "Toupou déménage"	Jérôme Erbin	Yves Montagne and Philippe Riche	4 May 2005	17 May 2005
Shoobz is going to spray the park overnight to get rid of the worms so Tupu has to stay at Norton's school overnight.
16	"Tupu on Vacation" "Toupou en vacances !"	Pierre Olivier	Dorothée Robert and Thierry Martin	2 May 2005	13 May 2005
Norton goes on vacation but everyone seems to leave him on his own. Tupu also tries to have a vacation, but she has a hard time dealing with the park by herself.
17	"Norton's Birthday" "L'anniversaire de Norton"	Johanna Stein	Luc Blanchard and Diego Zamora	5 May 2005	19 May 2005
Everyone forgets about Norton's birthday, so he goes out to celebrate it with Tupu instead. When they realise he is missing, everyone goes to search for him.
18	"Don't Judge a Book By Its Cover" "Ne vous fiez pas aux apparences"	Johanna Stein	Charles Vaucelle and Frank Leguay	6 May 2005	20 May 2005
Norton has to tutor a bully named John, however he finds John is not as bad as he seems.
19	"Trick or Treat" "L'épouvantail"	Johanna Stein	Yves Montagne	14 April 2005	22 April 2005
Norton gets invited to a party for Halloween, but he has already agreed to go trick or treating with Tupu. He does not want to go to the party with Tupu since he thinks that she will embarrass him.
20	"Beware of Gorilla" "Gare au gorille !"	Pepper Sue and Elastik Jane	Luc Blanchard	18 April 2005	26 April 2005
A major ecology campaign has been launched by City Hall: Lastar the gorilla, is due to be sent home to an African reserve. Norton discovers that Tupu has let Lastar out of his cage so she can show him her world!
21	"The End" "Adieu ?"	Johanna Stein	Dorothée Robert and Charles Vaucelle	9 May 2005	23 May 2005
Norton thinks he is getting taken away to a very selective boarding school. Since he does not want to be separated from Tupu, he starts acting badly in school.
22	"The Best Christmas Ever" "Le plus beau Noël"	Johanna Stein	Frank Leguay	12 August 2005	31 May 2005
Tupu's never heard about "Sandy Claws" guy before so Norton explains that he's a chubby old man with a white beard and a red coat. Later, Tupu bumps into grumpy old Walter Woodsy and thinks he must be the Sandy Claws she heard about!
23	"Paparazzi Alert!" "Toupou à la une !"	Pepper Sue and Elastik Jane	Dorothée Robert	11 May 2005	26 May 2005
Tupu has a bad toothache, so Norton tries to get her to a dentist. A journalist who wants to get his press pass wants to write a story about him since he is the Mayor's son, and he tries to figure out who he is meeting with.
24	"Jungle Jam in Central Park" "Le concert des animaux"	Johanna Stein	Jean-Luc Abiven	12 May 2005	27 May 2005
Norton joins a battle of the bands, and he gets assigned to play a tuba, however he is not very good at it.
25	"The Hat Trick" "Le voleur de chapeau"	Johanna Stein	Jean-Charles Fink	13 May 2005	30 May 2005
Tupu makes a hat and when it gets praised as a piece of art at school, Norton pretends that he made it and it gets entered into a fashion show. When Tupu needs it back, he pretends it was stolen by a hat thief.
26	"Let's Break the Ice" "Brisons la glace !"	Johanna Stein and & Sylvie Barro-Borincome	Frank Leguay and Charles Vaucelle	10 May 2005	24 May 2005
Norton signs up to participate in a charity hockey game, but he doesn't know how to ice skate.

== DVD release and petition ==
Tupu has been released on DVD in the Netherlands on three volumes. The first two DVDs consisting of four episodes, and the third containing five (half of the series). The only available language track is Dutch. One of the episodes has the wrong episode audio track, belonging to that of the first episode again. The DVDs were released by Bright Vision Entertainment and licensed by ZDF.

No country other than the Netherlands has had DVDs released. No further plans have been made for DVD releases in other countries. ABC no longer holds rights to release DVDs.

Online, there was a petition to get Tupu released on DVD. There was a need for 10,000 signatures, but it wasn't met.

An official Facebook website was created for Tupu on 28 May 2013. No information has been posted related to broadcast or DVDs.

== International broadcasts ==
The series had great success in numerous countries, being dubbed into languages such as Hebrew, Arabic, Turkish, Russian, German, Dutch, and many others.

The show now is quite rare, and many countries no longer hold rights to the show. The Australian Broadcasting Company did not broadcast the episodes in order; the episode order in this article is descended from the original French list, however the 2012 re-run of Tupu was ordered accordingly to the original French list. ABC repeated some episodes more than others; the 3 missing episodes to Tupu were only on once. ABC in Australia currently has no plans to re-purchase the rights to the series, and only ran the show four times, not in order. In France, Gulli cancelled the programme in 2012, ending on episode 14.

On March 29, 2013, the children's TV channel KiKa (from ZDF) finished airing the series. They also concluded on episode 14.

Country	Channel	Year
France	France 3	2005; 2008
France	Gulli	2007–2013
France	Disney Channel France	2007–2009
Canada	Super Écran	2006–2007
Australia	ABC Kids	2005–2008 (incl. repeats) The Australian Broadcasting Company has since lost rights to the show.
Great Britain	POP!	2006–2009
Germany	ZDF	2006–present (last seen the 19.3.13 but scheduling is being made)
Germany	KiKa	2006–present
Israel	Logi	2008–present
Italy	Rai 3	2006
Netherlands	Z@PP	2006 – Tupu was released on DVD in this language and country in Region 2. Only the first 12 (skipping "The Kangaroo" due to an error with dubbing the wrong episode)
