= Manon (character) =

Manon is an animated character in children's books and television programs. The books are written by Gerard Moncomble and Nadine Rouviere, and the character originally appeared in Toupie magazine

Geared for preschoolers, the books and cartoon focus on the character of Manon, a girl described as "the little queen of animals", and her adventures with the animals who live on the farm with her.

== Series ==
The books spawned a television cartoon series that is distributed around the world, and is produced and distributed by Cyber Group Studios, a France-based animation company.
