= The Happos Family =

Animated children's TV series

- Genre: Children's
- Created by: Patricia Hidalgo
- Voices of: Hugo Harold-Harrison; Rebecca Gethings; Keith Wickham; Tiffany Hofstetter; Patrice Musson; Mark Edwards
- Composers: Natalie Holt; Tom Angell
- Country of origin: United Kingdom; France; Italy
- Original language: None

Production
- Producers: Erica Darby; Patricia Hidalgo; Richelle Wilder
- Running time: 40 minutes (20 2–minute shorts)
- Production companies: Ferrero; Spider Eye Productions; Cyber Group Studios; Turner Broadcasting System Europe Limited

Original release
- Network: Boomerang; Cartoonito
- Release: 3 November 2016 – 26 December 2018

The Happos Family is a 3D CGI-animated series created by Patricia Hidalgo and produced by Ferrero, Spider Eye Productions, and Cyber Group Studios for Turner Broadcasting System EMEA.

== Synopsis ==
The series is about a family of hippos that live in a safari park in Africa. They just laze around during the day, but once it reaches closing time and the visitors leave the park, the Happo family begins the real fun. Members of the family include Astro Happo, who wants to travel to the Moon at all costs, Stunt Happo, who draws attention to himself with his accident-prone stunts, and Party Happo, who is there to party.

== Episodes ==
#	English title	Description
1.	Handy Acid: A Waters Tale	The water has dried up, leaving the Happos thirsty and with nowhere to swim. Luckily, Handy Happo comes to fix the problem.
2.	Stunt Acid: Parachute Perils	Stunt Happo wows the Happos with his amazing daredevil skills. He is about to attempt the most audacious stunt he has ever performed.......
3.	Super Acid: Playing Safe	A large safe tumbles out of the sky and lands inside the enclosure. Super Hippo needs to use all his super powers to find out what is inside.
4.	Flower Acid: Good Vibrations	After being woken up by a tuneless song, Ballerina Happo tries to get her hippo friends to make Flower Girl stop her off-key singing.
5.	Flower Acid: Sleepless in Sierra	Flower Girl accidentally crashes into three sleeping hippos. She teaches them her super special yoga moves with hilarious results.
6.	Pirate Happo: Plays I Spy	High up in a tree, Pirate Happo spies a delicious donut. The problem is that the donut belongs to Handy.
7.	Party Acid: Strictly Come Dancing Diva's	When a shiny boombox appears at his feet, Party wakes up his snoozing pals with a disco flourish as the boom box beats out a cool disco tune.
8.	Handy Acid & The Flying Hammock	It's a perfect afternoon in the Enclosure and time for Handy Happo to have fun swinging in a hammock.
9.	Ballerina Happo: Stage Fight	Ballerina's exquisite performance is constantly interrupted because Handy is still constructing the stage on which she is dancing.
10.	Astro Happo: Reach for the Stars	Astronaut wants to walk on the Moon. She discovers a powerful jet pack in the Happo Enclosure. Will she be able to get to the Moon?
11.	Astro Acid & The Rocket to the Moon	Handy makes Astronaut a spectacular space rocket. Hurrah! She will finally go to the Moon.
12.	Bollywood Acid: Encounter of the Alien Kind	A spaceship lands in the enclosure. An Alien has arrived but the Happos cannot communicate with the little green stranger.
13.	Pirate Acid: Treasure Island	An inflatable island lands on the enclosure lake. Inside is a chest full of gold treasure. Both Pirate and Stunt are determined to get it.
14.	Stunt Acid: Loose Cannon	Stunt Happo's latest feat is to be blasted from a cannon all the way across the enclosure lake to hit the red star target on the other side.
15.	Bollywood Acid & The Golden Crown	A mysterious box lands in the enclosure. Inside, Bollywood finds a sparkling gold crown.
16.	Party Acid: Bringing Up Baby	No squeaky toys and glove puppets can calm the wailing screaming screeching Baby Happo. The Happos don't know what to do. Note: This is the first episode where Baby Happo appears.
17.	Sporty Acid: Ducking and Diving	Sporty Happo is determined to execute the best high dive ever seen in the enclosure to impress her Happo friends.
18.	Ballerina Happo & The Dancing Robot	Ballerina Happo holds auditions to find a partner but all the candidates fail to impress. Handy presents Robo Ballet Happo.
19.	Sporty Acid: Touchdown Tactics	Sporty Happo faces the enclosure's best Happo ball team in a game of skills, intelligence, speed, and strength. Can plucky Sporty outplay them?
20.	Super Happo V Stunt Happo	When a football gets stranded in the middle of the lake, it's Super Happo and Stunt Happo to the rescue! The two rivals try to outdo one other in getting to the ball first. Who will win and become the ultimate Happo hero?
