= Droners =

2020 children's animated series

- Official poster
- Genre: Adventure; Comedy; Science fiction
- Created by: Pierre de Cabissole; Sylvain Dos Santos
- Directed by: Grégory Leterrier
- Composer: Fabien Nataf
- Country of origin: France
- Original language: French
- No. of seasons: 2
- No. of episodes: 52

Production
- Running time: 22 minutes
- Production companies: Cyber Group Studios; La Chouette Compagni; Supamonks Studios

Original release
- Network: TF1
- Release: 19 October 2020 – 30 June 2024

Droners is a French science-fiction action-adventure children's animated series created by Pierre de Cabissole and Sylvain Dos Santos, and directed by Grégory Leterrier. It was produced in France by Cyber Group Studios, La Chouette Compagni, and Supamonks Studios, and distributed by TF1. The series has 2 seasons, with a total of 52 episodes with a runtime of twenty-two minutes, airing from 19 October 2020 to 30 June 2024.

== Premise ==
Droners takes place on an ocean planet called Terraqua, which is in 95% covered by water, with the rest being archipelagos and atolls. It follows Corto, Enki, Mouse and Oro, a drone racing team known as the Tikis, from the island of Nuï, on a mission to save the future of their archipelago home, which is being threatened by marine submersion. To save it, they must win the toughest drone racing competition in the world, the Whale Cup, where the machines are powered by eel-like entities called G.E.N.I.E.s.

== Cast ==
=== French-language version ===
- Anaïs Delva as Corto
- Gabriel Bismuth-Bienaimé as Enki
- Kelly Marot as Mouse
- Thomas Sagols as Oro
- Stéphane Roux as Stéphane Roux
- Olivia Luccioni-Dassin as Neptune
- Hervé Grull as Adam and Dee Jay
- Leslie Lipkins as Mina
- Julien Meunier as Pavel
- Bruno Méyère as Manta and Sun
- Marie Nonnenmacher as Max
- Thierry Kazazian as Shark
- Flora Brunier as Flora, Laymanja and Saatchi
- Maik Darah as Queen Rust
- Mathilde Carmes as Ifa
- Caroline Combes as the commentator of the Tortuga Coliseum

=== English-language version ===
- Jet Walker as Corto
- Soso Bianchi as Mouse
- Ogie Banks as Enki
- Micheal Christopher as Oro
- Cedric L. Williams as Adam, Deejay and Shino
- Ryan Colt Levy as Manta and Fuzz
- Tiana Camacho as Debbie, Hannah, Laurel and Max
- Karen Strassman as Flora and Gavinda Teach
- Jenny Yokobori as Mina and Mawu
- Sonny Onorati as Sun and Monk
- Bill Butts as Big Moe and Pavel
- Michael Sorich as Kass Krane
- Kyle Hebert as Shark
- Melique Berger as Queen Rust

== Production ==
The series was created by Pierre de Cabissole and Sylvain Dos Santos, and directed by Grégory Leterrier. It was produced in France by Cyber Group Studios, La Chouette Compagni, and Supamonks Studios. The music was composed by Fabien Nataf. The series originally aired on TF1 in France, where its first season reached the top 3 of viewership.

== Episodes ==
Season	Episodes	Originally released		
Season	Episodes	First released	Last released	Network
1	26	19 October 2020	10 October 2021	TF1
2	26	9 April 2023	30 June 2024	TF1

=== Season 1 (2020–21) ===
No.	Title	Written by	Storyboarded by	Original airdate	Prod. code
1	"The Païpaï Race"	Pierre de Cabissole; Sylvain Dos Santos	Florian Ponty	19 October 2020	102
The Tikis face the Cold Kings on the Marais Circuit and learn that it's filled with terrifying creatures! Enki is bothered by his ignorance and goes into the jungle by himself to learn more.
2	"Spirale Looping"	Nils Mathieu	Pierre Lesca	20 October 2020	105
Corto is distracted by her crush on Sun from the Tao Twins and thinks she needs a technical solution to improve her drone racing speed. She ends up with an Aqua relic that may be more than she bargained for!
3	"Spider Circuit"	Christophe Courty	Jonathan Valette	21 October 2020	104
Team Tiki is sabotaged and the Pirates are accused of cheating, so they're suspended from the competition. They and Mouse believe they're being stereotyped because they're a team of Shore Scrubbers. But who is really behind the sabotage?
4	"Welcome to Paroa"	Sylvain Dos Santos; Antoine Maurel	Charles-Andre Lefebvre	22 October 2020	103
Maroro needs to be repaired, but the only place to find the right part is in Paroa – the land of the Shore Scrubbers. Mouse, who is a Shore Scrubber, guides the way, but Corto still manages to mess things up.
5	"Big Moe's Big Race"	Marine Lachenaud; Cédric Lachenaud	Florian Ponty	23 October 2020	111
When Big Moe discovers his daughter, Mouse, is secretly drone-racing, he heads to Whale Island to bring her home. Mouse must stand up for herself and prove to her dad that her true calling is in the competition.
6	"The Piranicus Race"	Marine Lachenaud; Sylvain Dos Santos	Zheping Xu	23 October 2020	101
When Enki is the only teen excluded from a party, he tries to act more 'normal'. But, he's so distracted by his social blunders that he forgets about Team Tiki's race against Team Siren!
7	"The Art of Illusion"	Marine Lachenaud; Sylvain Dos Santos	Sebastien Vovau	27 October 2020	107
Gavinda Teach of Teach Tech comes to visit her team, the Mirages. After a particularly bad training session, she tries to convince Corto to switch over to Teach Tech.
8	"The Great Egg Race"	Christophe Courty	Joanna Celse; Zheping Xu	28 October 2020	108
The Tikis, the Sirens, and the Tao Twins all race against each other to grab an egg and make it to the finish line first. Mina realizes she's at a disadvantage and tries to pit Sun and Corto against each other by playing with their crushes on each other.
9	"Ghost"	Sylvain Dos Santos; Marine Lachenaud; Antoine Maurel	Joanna Celse	29 October 2020	106
The Tikis and the Mirages are trapped in a haunted manor overnight during a storm. Enki believes the ghosts they're seeing are simply a technological prank, but no one seems to know what's really going on.
10	"Oro's Secret"	Camille Couasse; Claire Kanny	Fafah Togora	20 October 2020	112
The power goes out on Whale Island and the competition is suspended – maybe forever! But Corto is desperate to save her island, so she and the rest of the Tikis go out in search of an Aqua crystal that can help bring the power back.
11	"Bubblegum"	Sylvain Dos Santos; Marine Lachenaud	Sebastien Vovau	27 October 2020	111
The Tikis race against the Starfish on the Candy Shop Circuit. There's a technical incident which causes Oro and Shiny to switch places, unable to switch back! So they have to race on the other G.E.N.I.E.'s team.
12	"Spinning Tales"	Morgann Martin; Adrien Louiset	Cedric Fremeaux; Isabelle Piedfert	3 January 2021	110
Corto gets jealous of how much Mouse admires Max from Team Pirates, so Corto publicly accuses Max of lying about defeating Kumo, the Titan Spider. Max is unable to prove her story and everyone thinks she's a liar, even her own team.
13	"Eole Crash"	Christophe Courty	Pierre Lesca; Charles-Andre Leferbvre	10 January 2021	119
Manta challenges Corto to an underground race in the Hive, but Mouse fears that it'll destroy their drone.
14	"Out of Sync"	Segolene Basso-Brusa	Florian Ponty	17 January 2021	114
The Tikis have to team up with the Mirages – flying completely in sync! Corto and Hannah struggle to get along while Adam sneaks around and tries to learn more about G.E.N.I.E. technology.
15	"The Comeback Kid"	Christophe Courty	Jonathan Valette	24 January 2021	113
Enki finds old records of Wyatt Whale participating in drone races. The pictures go viral around the island and everyone wants to race Wyatt, though he hasn't raced in a long time.
16	"Race for the Khepri"	Morgann Martin; Adrien Louiset	Pierre Lesca	11 April 2021	117
The Tikis race against the Bees and try to catch a Khepri, which is a small but fast robotic beetle.
17	"Into the Maelstrom"	Christophe Courty	Pierre Lesca	18 April 2021	115
Victoria's mother comes to visit and forces Mina to give up her role as pilot during a special race against the Tikis, which follows their elite Maelstrom rules.
18	"Droners Express"	Benoit Boucher; Christophe Courty; Marine Lachenaud	Florian Ponty	5 September 2021	120
Shark brags that he's the three-time winner of Paroa's Courier Trophy, so Corto challenges him to a race.
19	"Duelling Drones"	Nils Mathieu	Zheping Xu	12 September 2021	116
Mouse wants to race in the Shore Scrubber's challenge, but it's at the exact same time as Team Tiki's next race!
20	"The Relay Race"	Alice Giordan; Anais Topla	Joanna Celse	19 September 2021	121
Corto and Sun are excited when their teams get to work together for a relay race, but Monk gets jealous of all the attention his brother is paying Corto.
21	"Kami's Race"	Antoine Maurel; Morgann Martin; Adrien Louiset	Fafah Togora	26 September 2021	122
After Team Mirage breaks into Wyatt Whale's office and steals a baby G.E.N.I.E., the baby escapes and hides among the Tikis.
22	"The Great Belugaga Race"	Morgann Martin; Adrien Louiset	Sebastien Vovau	3 October 2021	123
After Corto pays her a compliment, Debbie becomes obsessed with Corto and even quits the Starfish to support her.
23	"The Polaris Predicament"	Segolene Basso-Brusa; Christophe Courty	Joanna Celse	10 October 2021	118
Because he keeps losing, Polaris Academy sends a new racer named Pavel to replace Manta as pilot of the Cold Kings.
24	"Race for a Cure"	Pierre de Cabissole	Zheping Xu	10 October 2021	124
The G.E.N.I.E.s for Teams Tiki and Bee are hit by a pollen allergy, so Enki, Fuzz, and Buzz work together to find a cure.
25	"The Final Race: Part 1"	Sylvain Dos Santos; Pierre de Cabissole	Pierre Lesca	10 October 2021	125
The Tikis qualify for the grand finale race against the Tao Twins and the Mirages, but Gavinda Teach decides to come visit.
26	"The Final Race: Part 2"	Sylvain Dos Santos; Pierre de Cabissole	Isabelle Piedfert; Florian Ponty	10 October 2021	126
The Tikis win the final race of the Whale Cup, but accidentally awaken the Titan Crab.

=== Season 2 (2023–24) ===
No. overall	No. in season	Title	Written by	Storyboarded by	Original airdate	Prod. code
27	1	"Welcome to Tortuga: Part 1"	Sylvain Dos Santos; Pierre de Cabissole	Pierre Lesca; Caroline Rondeau	9 April 2023	201
Nuï is saved thanks to Wyatt Whale. However, when Corto finds him lamenting about the other islands' fate and learns there might be a way to save them all, she embarks him, the Tikis, the Pirates and the Bees, on a trip to Tortuga, the biggest Shorescrubber settlement to get help from its powerful ruler, the Rust Queen.
28	2	"Welcome to Tortuga: Part 2"	Sylvain Dos Santos; Pierre de Cabissole	Yuaë Tiouka & Manon Serda	9 April 2023	202
The Tikis need to qualify for the Rotor Punch, a drone racing tournament, to obtain the Aquae crystals needed to power Whale's idea to stop the rising waters. In the race, they meet old acquaintances, some they would have liked to forget.
29	3	"The Wotan Race"	Christophe Courty	Caroline Rondeau	15 April 2023	203
The Tikis have to race against the Blizzard Bosses in Tortuga's frozen area, but Corto and Oro can't stand the cold weather. Manta offers to help Corto as a way to get back at Pavel.
30	4	"Trial by Track"	Cédric Lachenaud; Marine Lachenaud	Pierre Lesca; Caroline Rondeau	16 April 2023	204
Saddened by an injustice done to him, Oro steals a relic from the Rust Queen's museum. When he and Corto are caught by Ifa before they can deliver it back, they must follow a shorescrubber tradition and win a race to be pardoned.
31	5	"The Nurato Race"	Christophe Courty	David Cazeaux; Soizic Delon	22 April 2023	205
Corto messed up again and angered the Zaelots with a prank on Ifa. In order to fix her mistake, she and Oro have to brave the powerful maelstrom Nurato to get a new relic for the Zaelots.
32	6	"The Pocamourus Race"	Camélia Acef; Julia Folio	Yuaë Tiouka; Manon Serda	22 April 2023	206
For a love-themed race, Corto and Manta are paired and even have to pilot a combined drone together to race against Hannah and Sun, much to Corto's chagrin.
33	7	"The Royal Race"	Christophe Courty	David Cazeaux; Soizic Delon	23 April 2023	207
The Rust Queen announces a royal race where all eight teams will participate, but the Tikis do not know the rules and do not get they have to ally themselves with someone if they want to win. When the alliance between Hannah and Manta dominate the race, Corto must find a way to overcome this hurdle.
34	8	"The Aquae Knight Race"	Antoine Maurel; Grant Sauvé	David Cazeaux	26 April 2023	208
While punished for a mishap caused by Corto, the Tikis are introduced to an illegal racing track by the Pirates. Corto recognizes someone in the way of piloting the champion, the Aquae Knight, however, her discovery attracts the attention of an old foe, Kass Krane.
35	9	"The Mechanix Race"	Marie Seurin; Mathilde Belin	Pierre Lesca	29 April 2023	209
The Tikis must race against the Falcons for a race where the skills of the mecanix are the keys to winning. Both teams' mecanixes, Mouse and Lila, end up striking a friendship which displeases Corto and Hannah, who are very competitive with each other.
36	10	"The Restricted Race"	Chérifa Tsouri; Mathilde Cadrot	Yuaë Tiouka; Manon Serda	30 April 2023	210
After a race, the Rust Queen compliments Corto, which pleases the young girl but irritates Ifa. When Corto declares she is going to enter a restricted area to fix a problem for the Zealots, Ifa gets even more riled up. While Corto is eventually reasoned, Ifa decides to tackle the issue himself, even if it means risking his life.
37	11	"The Boomer Race"	Christophe Courty	Soizic Delon	26 August 2023	211
During an official dinner, Corto's words trigger an argument between Lavinia, Wyatt Whale and the Rust Queen, which ends up with a race; the three older pilots against each other and one younger pilot: Corto. Corto feels pressured to win and prove the younger generation's worth as Hannah, Manta and Mina try to help her prepare.
38	12	"The Race for the Monkeyglide"	Marine Lachenaud; Cédric Lachenaud; Sylvain Dos Santos	Caroline Rondeau; Yuaë Tiouka	2 September 2023	212
Enki's parents visit him on Tortuga, but he gets jealous of the attention they give to the Planktons, their next adversaries. However, the Rust Queen decides to change the rules and sends the teams into Tortuga's forest to prove the existence of the Monkeyglide, a creature thought to be a myth. Enki's desire to impress his parents and beat the Planktons might be a problem.
39	13	"The Planktons' Secret"	Sylvain Dos Santos; Antoine Maurel	Pierre Lesca; Manon Sedra	9 September 2023	213
Oro accidentally angers the Planktons and they cause Maroro to crash in the frozen area of Tortuga. However, when they go back to get him back to the Tikis, they do not find him: he has been taken by the "ghost of Tortuga". Even if the Rust Queen forbade them from going there, the Tikis would not abandon Oro, and the Planktons would tag along.
40	14	"The Treasure Hunt"	Adéle Heynemann; Thibaut Tupler	Caroline Rondeau	16 September 2023	214
Enki's curiosity is triggered by Mina's explanation about a lost relic of Maelstrom. However, he accidentally catches the interest of the Rust Queen in the relic so that she can add it to her treasure. The Tikis will have to find a way to fix this mess without creating too many waves.
41	15	"The Predator Race"	Benoît Boucher	Caroline Rondeau	23 March 2024	215
For the next race, the Rust Queen announces it will be a game of hide-and-seek between two teams, the predators and the prey. Corto is not thrilled at being a prey, but she is even less happy to be teamed up with the Planktons. However, Lemanja's ideas might be what they need to win this game.
42	16	"The Bee-Turtle Race"	Romain Gadiou; Chloé Sastre	Soizic Delon	1 April 2024	216
While a Bee-Turtle acts aggressively on the shores of Tortuga, Gungir, the Blizzard Bosses' drone, is reportedly stolen. Pavel accuses Corto, but the thief turns out to be an unexpected person with an incredible reason.
43	17	"The Chefs' Race"	Grégory Leterrier	Pierre Lesca	2 April 2024	217
Chef Otaqua participates in the Rotor Punch by having the Droners cook. While unconvinced by any of them, he chose the Blizzard Bosses and the Tikis for the race. Corto is happy, but she finds herself in a bind when Mouse and Enki cannot stop arguing about what they must cook while Pavel is revealed to be a talented cook.
44	18	"Baba's Race"	Christophe Courty	Yuaë Tiouka	3 April 2024	218
Baba's behavior causes concern to Ifa as Mouse discovers a part of his past that explains why the next race seems to agitate him so much. Despite Baba and Mouse's warnings, Ifa and Corto take a shortcut that lands them straight into trouble.
45	19	"The Third Eye Race"	Christophe Courty	David Cazeaux	4 April 2024	219
After Sun's new attack temporarily blinds Corto, the Tikis have to find a way to race against the Blizzard Bosses. Sun and Lotus propose to train Corto and Oro to use the same technique that permits Sun to see through Lotus' eyes. The only problem is that it relies on the mastery of Zen... and Corto is anything but zen!
46	20	"The Mystery Race"	Christophe Courty	Soizic Delon	5 April 2024	220
Corto impresses everyone with her piloting skills, but the Tikis' next race is about enginerd skills. Enki's patience might run out.
47	21	"The Labyrinth Race"	Romain Gadiou; Chloé Sastre	Pierre Lesca & Yuaë Tiouka	24 March 2024	221
The Rust Queen and Whale came up with a new surprise: they put a labyrinth in the race. Meanwhile, Hannah is stressed as her relationship with Kami becomes tense, not helped by Corto's tauntings.
48	22	"The Tsunami Challenge"	Nicolas David; Antoine Maurel; Grant Sauvé	Manon Sedra; Caroline Rondeau	26 March 2024	222
The Rotor Punch is put on hold as the Buzzball competition begins. The Tikis are visited by Mouse's older brother, Vago, as they meet the Rust Queen's unexpected guest, Buzzball team Tsunami's champion: Loopi. Loopi is the person Corto admires, but she has to find it in herself to win against her idol.
49	23	"The Race or the Key"	Christophe Courty	David Cazeaux	2 June 2024	223
Hannah discovers a shocking secret about Cold as the Tikis and the Blizzard Bosses are about to race. Pavel wants to steal the key to the vault, and Hannah and the Tikis must find a way to stop him without alerting the Rust Queen.
50	24	"The Magnetis Race"	Pierre de Cabissole	Hugo Llames; Soizic Delon	9 June 2024	224
A dispute between Oro and Nemo leads to a dangerous bet as the Tikis and the Sirens have to race and fly by the dangerous Magnetis, a giant magnet which eventually pulls in anything that gets attracted into it. Meanwhile, Kami decides to take revenge on Nemo for his nasty temper by scaring him during the race. But, it does not go as planned.
51	25	"The Rotor Punch Race: Part 1"	Pierre de Cabissole; Antoine Maurel; Sylvain Dos Santos	David Cazeaux; Caroline Rondeau	30 June 2024	225
The final race is here, but Antaboga has found new allies and they threaten to destroy Tortuga. Meanwhile, Oro is torn between two worlds.
52	26	"The Rotor Punch Race: Part 2"	Pierre de Cabissole; Antoine Maurel; Sylvain Dos Santos	Pierre Lesca	30 June 2024	226
The Rust Queen prepares to confront Antaboga as Tortuga falls into chaos. The Tikis must fight and Oro has an important decision to take.

== Other media ==
The story has been expanded with a three-volume series of manga books titled Droners: Tales of Nuï, written by Sylvain Dos Santos and David Nicolas.
