= Mademoiselle Zazie =

- 5 of the 6 main characters, from left to right: Cindy, Max, Zazie, Abigail and Pedro.
- Genre: Adventure; Comedy
- Based on: "Mademoiselle Zazie" by Delphine Durand and Thierry Lenain
- Directed by: Romain Villemaine
- Voices of: Mélanie Dermont; Raphaëlle Lubansu; Maia Baran; Audrey d'Hulstere; Michel Hinderyckx; David Manet; Coralie Vanderlinden; Fanny Roy; David Macaluso; Béatrice Wegnez
- Composers: Victor Belin; Antoine Eole
- Countries of origin: France; Singapore; Canada
- Original language: French
- No. of seasons: 1
- No. of episodes: 13

Production
- Producers: Pierre Sissmann; Seng Choon Meng; Wong Chi Kong
- Running time: 22 minutes
- Production companies: Cyber Group Studios; Scrawl Studios

Original release
- Network: France 5
- Release: August 24, 2013 – 2014

Mademoiselle Zazie (also known as Miss Zazie) is an animated television series produced in 2013 by Cyber Group Studios and Scrawl Studios, and broadcast on France 5's Zouzous block from August 24, 2013 to an unknown date of 2014. A single season of 13 episodes was produced.

== Premise ==
Mademoiselle Zazie is about two 7-year-old best friends named Zazie and Max, who live by the seaside with the others and have fun together.

== Characters ==
=== Main ===
- Zazie, She has red hair in twintails
- Cindy, She has blonde hair, blue eyes and wears glasses
- Abigail
- Max, He is tall and thin with black hair
- Pedro, He is short and chubby with brown hair
- Tarek
- Alfredo
- Clodomir

== Episodes ==
No.	Title	Original release date
1	"Mademoiselle Zazie's Best Friend/ Teach at the Beach/ Mademoiselle Zazie's Nit-Picking"	
2	"Weird Weeds/ Pet Monster/ Give and Take"	
3	"Mademoiselle Zazie's Great Escape/ Batu-Batu/ Max's Blues"	TBA
4	"Mystery Daddy / Family Secret / Living in a Fishbowl"	TBA
5	"When Mademoiselle Zazie Grows Up / Graffiti Mystery"	TBA
6	"The Beach Monster / A Real Champion / Myrtle"	TBA
7	"Fed Up with Being a Princess! / When Toocute's Away / Tarek and the Creepy Crabs"	TBA
8	"The Dad's Audition / Pajama Party / How to Become Interesting"	TBA
9	"Cindy's a Celebrity / The Teacher's Secret Service / Pedro's Challenge"	TBA
10	"Bucket of Crabs / Max the Fibber / Has Anyone Seen Tarek?"	TBA
11	"Dust Bites / Stage Fright / Princess and Dragons"	TBA
12	"Abigail's Number One Fan / Desperately Seeking a Green Pen / Shrimps can Dunk Too"	TBA
13	"The Case of the Missing Case / Impossible Rescue / Shame about the Hair"	

== Broadcast ==
Mademoiselle Zazie debuted on France 5's Zouzous block on August 24, 2013. It also aired on France 4 and TV5Monde in France, and TFO and Yoopa in Canada. In the United States, the English dub of Mademoiselle Zazie premiered on Kabillion's Kabillion Girls Rule! on March 15, 2015. By December 2021, this series was also aired by TVRI in Indonesia.
