= Eesh Safari =

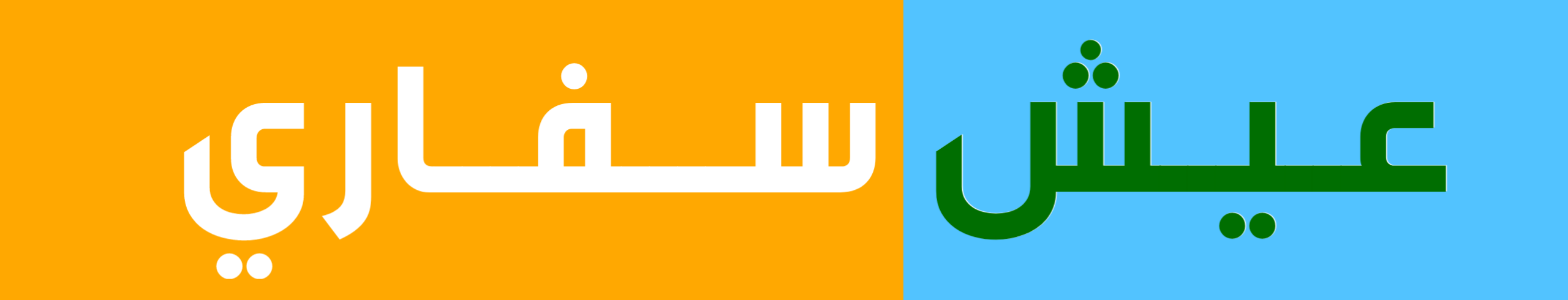
- Haitho La Makan Ella Lel Shoj'an
- Created by: MBC 3
- Starring: Jalal Shahda in (season 1), Hassan Al-Mula (season 2 - season 6), Asala Kamel
- Country of origin: United Arab Emirates
- Original language: Arabic
- No. of seasons: 10
- No. of episodes: 90 (incl. sequels)

Production
- Executive producer: Middle East Broadcasting Center
- Running time: 30 minutes (incl. commercials)

Original release
- Network: MBC Group
- Release: 9 May 2005 – present

Eesh Safari (Live Safari) is a TV reality show produced by the Middle East Broadcasting Center for the channel MBC 3. The show's main idea is to star a variety of children from around the Arab world to camp around with an organized team (by MBC 3) which is filled with coaches, traveling planners, and more. The show is exclusively aired on the channel it was designed for MBC 3. The show received huge success from Arab children, and so did its sequel, which was filmed in a different area located in Thailand.

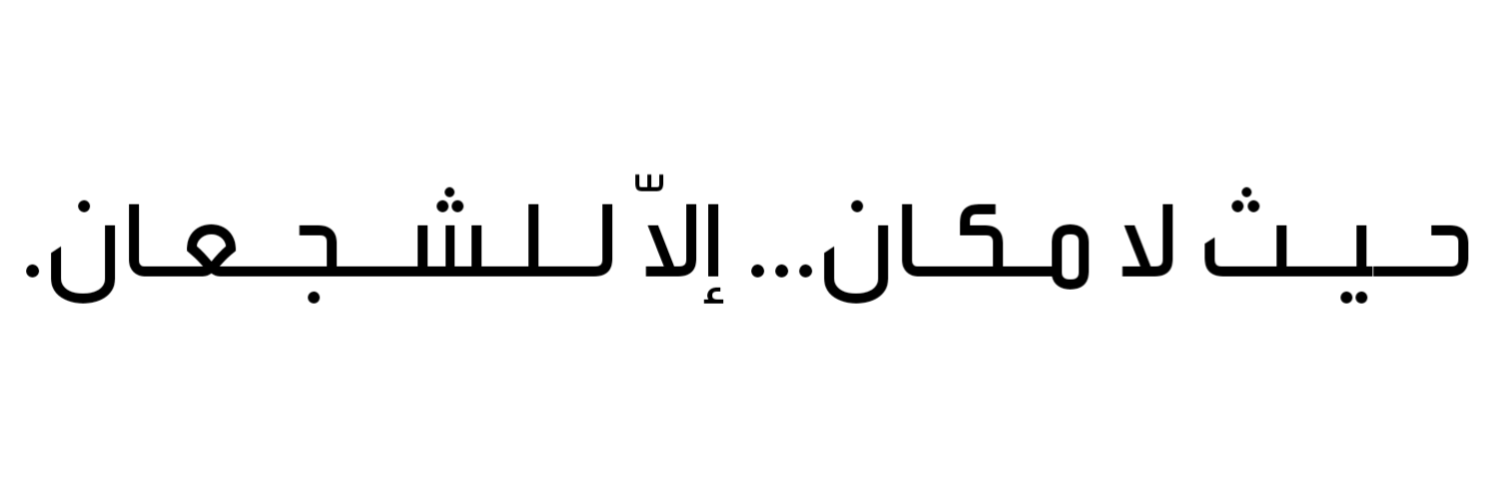
The program's slogan in Arabic translates into English as "Where there is no place... but for the brave."

== Information and parts ==
Eesh Safari mainly consists of 2 teams, which are named after the most 2 popular animals in the region they're traveling to, using the region's language. E.g. South Africa's giraffe and rhinoceros translated to Edubè and Umkumbè.

=== First season ===
==== Filming location and cultures ====
The first part of Eesh Safari was filmed in a natural sanctuary in South Africa. The culture was a South African tribe, called the Zulu. One of the main tasks in the Eesh Safari competition was completing the traditional Zulu house, which becomes the main task (but for Thai houses) in the sequel.

==== Teams ====
Edubè: This team is named after the Zulu name for the giraffe, and is the team that lost the competition. It is the orange team in Eesh Safari 1 and was led by participant Yasmin from Lebanon.

Umkumbè: This team is named after the Zulu name for the rhino, and is the team that won the competition. It is the green team in Eesh Safari 1 and was led by the participant Ammar from Jordan.

=== Second season ===
==== Filming location and cultures ====
The second part of Eesh Safari was filmed in another natural sanctuary but in Thailand. The culture was that of the typical Thai people living in an area near the sanctuary. One of the main tasks in the Eesh Safari competition was to build a traditional Thai house, which was similar to the first season, and is recognized as an Eesh Safari tradition. The participants of the Eesh Safari show also shared in learning kickboxing, which is a popular Thai type of martial arts.

==== Teams ====
Rachasi: This team is named after the Thai name for the tiger (which is one of the most popular animals in Thailand) and is the team that won the competition. It is the orange team in Eesh Safari 2 and was led by the participant Al-Khansa'a from Morocco.

Kochasan: This team is named after the Thai naming for the elephant (which is less popular than the tiger in Thailand), and is the team that lost the competition, although most fans and even the presenter Hassan Al-Mula and coaches think they did the most effort, and they're best known for their "team anthem" called "Ya Laleh", which is composed by the team's leader Mu'ayyad from Saudi Arabia.

=== Third season ===
The third part of Eesh Safari was filmed in Australia. The culture was that of the aboriginal Australians. It was the most unsuccessful season between the three, due to a lack of active personalities and so-called "very strict" coaches. The main teams were the Kangaroo Team and the Koala Team.

=== Fourth season ===
The fourth season is now in production. Participants in the fourth season were called and confirmed on-air on June 27, 2008.

== Eesh Safari's social, cultural, and physical help ==
Eesh Safari is a helper method to the native parts of the regions that the show uses for the contests. Participants of Eesh Safari usually clean up their left-overs and help themselves with problems that occur to their habitats or own property, such as a flood that occurred in the second part of the show. Other than teaching the children to help themselves, and teaching them teamwork, the show also helps the native parts of the region by "punishments" teams who lose, which, most of the time, brings fun to the punished team's hearts. The punishments are always dealing with helping the native people in the region, such as cleaning animals feces, collecting unnecessary weeds on the coast and in gardens, washing up farm animals, and many more. Also, participating in quizzes, visiting cultures, building traditional homes, going to scientific places and a lot of other activities teach participants and also the watchers of the show physical, scientific, cultural, and social help.

== See also ==
- MBC 3
- Middle East Broadcasting Center
