= Cyber Group Studios =

Liquidated French animation studio (2003–2025)

- Final logo used from 2010 to 2025
- Formerly: Cyber Group Animation (2003–2009)
- Industry: Animation
- Founded: August 11, 2003; 23 years ago
- Founder: Pierre Sissmann; Dominique Bourse; Billy "Frédéric" Richard; Olivier Lelardoux; Cécilia Bossel
- Defunct: April 28, 2025; 17 months ago
- Fate: Liquidation
- Successor: Euro Visual
- Headquarters: Paris, France
- Key people: Dominique Bourse (chairman and CEO); Richard Goldsmith; (president and CEO, Cyber Group Studios USA); Pierre Belaisch (CCO); Raphael Matthieu (COO)
- Subsidiaries: Cyber Group Studios USA; A Productions (2022–2025); Graphilm Entertainment; Scrawl Animation; CyberSplash Entertainment (50%; 2022–2025)
- Website: www.cybergroupstudios.com

Cyber Group Studios (formerly Cyber Group Animation) was a French developer, producer and distributor of animated television series and movies for children in France and internationally.

It was founded in 2003 by Pierre Sissmann, Dominique Bourse, Billy "Frédéric" Richard, Olivier Lelardoux and Cécilia Bosselin. In addition to licensing its own and third-party characters, the company produced 3D and 2D animations for television series and films, web series, news programs, and documentaries.

== History ==
Founded in 2003 as Cyber Group Animation, it changed its name to Cyber Group Studios (CGS) in March 2009. In January 2017, a year after acquiring Pictor Media, CGS launched Cyber Group Studios USA, a subsidiary located at Culver Studios in Culver City, California, headed by CEO Richard Goldsmith.

Six months after the investment firm L-GAM acquired the stakes of its minority investors, Cyber Group hired former VP and MD at Disney Interactive EMEA, Thierry Braille, as head of its new interactive division on March 1, 2018, and opened an animation studio in Roubaix, Francee in November.

Having acquired the UK-based production company A Productions on January 25, 2022, CGS purchased the Italian animation studio Graphilm Entertainment on February 8. Two months later, it announced that it had formed a new joint venture with Splash Entertainment called CyberSplash Entertainment.

On June 2, 2023, Dominique Bourse was named chairman and CEO of Cyber Group Studios, with Pierre Sissman retiring from the company. On March 11, 2024, Sissman was succeeded as the company's chief creative officer when Pierre Belaisch was appointed to the position.

On November 7, 2024, Cyber Group announced that it had entered the judicial recovery process from insolvency. In December, four takeover bids for CGS were registered: a joint venture between United Smile, Toonz Media Group and Atlas Global; Solent Productions; Newen Studios; and Hildegarde.

On April 28, 2025, the Paris Commercial Court ruled that Cyber Group Studios would be liquidated. On November 3, it was reported that one of its former subsidiaries, A Productions, had returned to 100% independent ownership.

In January 2026, it was reported that co-founder Pierre Sissmann had partnered with Grégoire Parcollet through the latter's company Euro Visual to acquire 80% of Cyber Group Studios' assets.

In February 2026, it was reported that former subsidiary Graphilm Entertainment had also returned to 100% independent ownership and regained the animated series McFire Family, which was in production when Cyber Group Studios closed down.

In March 2026, it was reported that EuroVisual Studios has gained the rights to the Final Fantasy IX series now titled Final Fantasy, Black Mages Legacy, and it is slated for 2028.

== Filmography ==
Some are adaptations, while others are licensed from other countries.

- 50/50 Heroes
- Adam's Bakery
- Animalia
- Balloopo
- The Bellflower Bunnies
- Underdogs United
- Bambalayé
- Blondes
- Cloud Bread
- Cotoons
- Calimero
- Crime Time
- Dragon Striker
- Droners
- Ernest & Rebecca
- Fish 'n' Chips
- Farmkids
- Final Fantasy IX
- G-Fighters
- Gigantosaurus
- Grenadine and Peppermint
- Guess What? Timothy and Annabel
- The Happos Family
- Iqbal: Tales of a Fearless Child
- The Last Kids on Earth
- Leo the Wildlife Ranger
- The Long Long Holiday
- Mademoiselle Zazie
- Manon
- Menino and the Children of the World
- Mia
- Mini Ninjas
- Mirette Investigates
- My Goldfish Is Evil!
- Nina Patalo
- Orange Moocow
- Ozie Boo!
- Patch Pillows
- Pet Alien
- The Pirates Next Door (fr)
- Pom Pom and Friends
- Precious Moments
- Press Start!
- Raju the Rickshaw
- Sadie Sparks
- Squared Zebra
- The Space Commanders
- Taffy
- Tales of Tatonka
- Tom Sawyer
- Zak Jinks (fr)
- Zorro: The Chronicles
- Zou
