= Toupie =

French children's magazine

Toupie is a French magazine for children 3 to 6 years of age. The magazine was established in 1985. It is part of Milan Presse, a division of Bayard Presse. The magazine is published on a monthly basis.
