= Tales of Tatonka =

French computer-animated cartoon series

- Genre: Children's television series Adventure
- Created by: Olivier Lelardoux
- Composers: Didler Ledan; Joseph Refalo
- Country of origin: France
- Original language: French
- No. of seasons: 2
- No. of episodes: 52

Production
- Executive producer: Heléne Maret
- Producers: Pierre Sissmann; Billy "Fredéric" Richard
- Editor: Cecile Rougnaux
- Running time: 13 minutes
- Production company: Cyber Group Studios

Original release
- Network: TiJi; France 3 Piwi+
- Release: 2010 – 2011

Tales of Tatonka (French: Les Légendes de Tatonka) is a 2010 French computer-animated series created by Olivier Lelardoux and produced by Cyber Group Studios.

The series depicts the adventures of four wolf cubs and their animal friends while being guided by the bison Tatonka. The end of each episode always has an educational segment about the lives of animals. The series first aired in France on TiJi, France 3 and Piwi+ and on Télé-Québec in Canada. The series has also aired in South Africa, Australia, India, Belgium, Italy, Russia, Brazil, United Kingdom, Portugal, Spain, China and Indonesia.

According to Animation Magazine, the series "received international recognition, including a nomination for a Golden Panda in China and Karusel TV’s Best Kids’ Series in Russia."

== Characters ==
- Tatonka: A wise and old bison who often guides the main characters and narrates every episode.
- Wanji: A wolf cub with dark brown fur with off white back legs and caramel brown muzzle. He is the oldest of the litter and next leader of the pack. He will face off against anyone who wants to harm him and his siblings.
- Cinksi: A bobcat kit who is best friends with Wanji. He is a risk taker and not afraid to speak his mind.
- Yamni: A wolf cub with sandy brown fur and white muzzle, legs, and under belly. The second oldest of the litter, she help anyone or challenge anyone for her family even when she's injured.
- Topa: A wolf cub with white fur and light brown mixed in. She is the youngest of the litter and most caring and is very shy and quiet and is scared of dangerous situations. She also is really afraid of Kallisca.
- Nunpa: A wolf cub with a mixture of white, brown, and tan fur. He is the third oldest in the litter and can be brave and enough to face anyone, is clumsy at times″
- Wahi: A red squirrel who can be very loud and hyper. He thinks mostly about his food and argues with about anything. He is afraid of any predators and will show his cowardice which the other kids make fun of him for. But he can be considerate.
- Poum: A grizzly bear cub with reddish patch of fur on his left eye. He also thinks about food and will beg for it. He is also prideful about being a bear, but is also sensitive.
- Moose: A moose calf with premature antlers and the son of Big Moose and is a part of a herd. He is kind and brave enough to push Kallisca off a cliff to save his friends. He can sometimes rush into conclusions.
- Basakai: A wolf cub whose fur is a mixture of white, and grey, with a white muzzle, she can be a bit braver and she is a friend of Cinksi. She stands up to Luta and Ska and stops their nasty tricks.
- Ayuhel: An adolescent moose with almost adult antlers, who often seen arguing with Big Moose.
- Pahin: A female North American porcupine who is scared of dangerous predators, and hyper. But can become brave and smart enough to deal with problems.
- Tap-Tap: A beaver who tries to build the best dam. But she can become bossy and a little rude when things don't go as planned, but she can be friendly and childish when she is playing with her friends.
- Wanbli: A female bald eagle who can sometimes become forgetful and scatterbrained but she will do anything for her friends.
- Luta: A wolf cub with grayish black fur with white fur on his face legs and underbelly. He is Wanji's cousin but he is jealous, mean, and rude sometimes even to Ska. He likes to make fun of and cause trouble for the other kids.
- Ska: A wolf cub with grayish black fur is Luta's younger brother. He can be mean but he shows a little cowardice at times. He likes to play tricks on the other kids with his brother who sometimes yells at him.
- Wicasa: The leader of the wolf pack, and the father of Wanji, Nunpa, Yamni, and Topa. A large wolf with reddish-grey fur that gives off deep purple hue. Stern, loving, and courageous.
- Winyan: The mother of Wanji, Nunpa, Yamni, and Topa. A large she-wolf with white fur that has hints of tan and brown. Loving, wise, and calm.
- Tanksi and Akewanji: Are adolescent wolves. Tanksi is a young female wolf with black, brown, and tan fur. She is very sweet and caring. Akewanji is a male wolf with ash grey fur with tints of darker grey. He is clever, responsible, often helps look after the cubs
- Winona: The mother of Luta and Ska. She has lovely brown fur with white under markings. Thoughtful, selfless, sincere.
- Willinam: The late father of Luta and Ska.
- Mato: The uncle of Poum. He often seems very aggressive and takes things seriously.
- Ina: The mother of Cinksi. Independent, quiet, and clever
- Alfa: The father of Wanbli who doesn't speak.
- Spirit Bear: A white bear who doesn't speak. A gentle and perceptive giant
- Big Moose: The father of Moose and leader of the moose herd. Strong, bold, and level-headed.
- Mallka : The father of Basakai.
- Luisa : The mother of Basakai.
- Renegade Wolves: The rival of Wicasa's pack, has 3 members and its chief is Taima. The Renegades are always trying to steal food and territory, or attacking/eating the young protagonists(including Wanji and his siblings) Taima is a large arrogant, cruel, and, selfish male wolf with reddish-black fur, a white face, grey legs, and yellowish-green eyes. His followers are two other young male wolves named Chaska and Hesutu, both have greyish-brown fur with tan and lighter grey markings; Although, Chaska has a tan face with black eye markings and a tan rump. His personality is rough and witty. On the other hand, Hesutu's face has tan markings on his brow, as the sides and underside of his muzzle and cheek fur, and his personality is more stoic but no less mean with a more gravelly voice
- Tork: A mountain lion with golden-brown fur with reddish brown and white markings. He is arrogant, cunning, stubborn, and disrespectful. Always looking for easy prey.
- Akicita: A male wolverine with black, white, and grey fur. He is vicious, greedy, and territorial
- The Coyotes: A trio of coyotes that try to hunt and eat the young protagonists
- Kallisca: The leader of the coyotes with a pale tan coat the most dangerous of his gang. Arrogant and sly, often calling Widco and Maslika idiots for failing simple tasks. But is quick to cower and flee when a larger animal is gunning for him.
- Widco: A reddish-brown coyote who argues with his brother Maslika about who is the chief of them both. Widco is brash and also tries to undercut Kallisca's authority when he and Maliska hunt, to take all the food for themselves. But he is also quick to cower and fall in line when Kallisca is around(because he both respects and fears Kallisca), and will even blame Maslika to take some of the heat off him.
- Maslika: A grey coyote who argues with his brother Widco about who is chief of both of them. While Maslika likes to throw his weight around his younger brother, Widco, he is shown to be more of a follower than a leader and a people-pleaser when Kallisca is around (because he both respects and fears Kallisca). He sometimes blames Widco for taking some of the heat off him.
- The Dark Eagle: A black golden eagle often seen trying to hunt the protagonists.
- The Snakes: Are a pair of bullsnakes who try to attack the protagonists and they do not speak.
