= Mirette Investigates =

- Genre: Adventure; Comedy; Mystery
- Directed by: Florence Heitz
- Composers: Jonathan Menard; Jean-Luc Daniel; Bastien Deshayes; Nicolas Clergue
- Countries of origin: France; Spain
- Original languages: French; English
- No. of seasons: 1
- No. of episodes: 52

Production
- Executive producer: Pierre Sissmann
- Producers: Helene Maret; Patricia Robert
- Editor: Elodie Liger
- Running time: 11 minutes
- Production companies: Cyber Group Studios; KD Productions

Original release
- Network: TF1 (France); Televisió de Catalunya (Spain)
- Release: 6 November 2016 – 2017

Mirette Investigates (French: Les enquêtes de Mirette) (Catalan: Les investigacións de la Mirette) is an animated series based on a series of picture books by the author Fanny Joly and published by Éditions Sarbacane. Laurent Audouin illustrated the books, which debuted in 2008. The show premiered on TF1's TFOU on 6 November 2016, and is billed as the "first travelling detective comedy".

== Premise ==
The show revolves on the international adventures of a young French detective named Mirette and her talking feline assistant Jean-Pat as they travel with Mirette's travel-agent father and solve mysteries.

== Characters ==
- Mirette: An eleven-year-old girl who wants to be the world's greatest detective under the age of twelve. She prefers using traditional technology to solve mysteries.
- Jean-Pat: A tech-savvy and lazy cat who is Mirette's main partner in their adventures.
- Detective Mollo: A detective who has an unreliable performance in his job.
- Sophie Scoop: A thirteen-year-old girl who is Mirette's best friend and wants to be a news reporter. She is also the number one fan of Jean-Pat.
- The Grand Villain International (GVI): The only member of the FPECTRE secret organization, he wants to turn the world into a giant minigolf course and attempts to harm Mirette. He has a dog named Gérard.

== Production ==
Mirette Investigates was one of the projects pitched at the European animation event Cartoon Forum in 2013. Production began in October 2014. It was produced by Cyber Group Studios and KD Productions.

== Release ==
The show was sold to TF1 and Canal+ (France), TV3 (Catalonia), WDR (Germany), Teletoon+ (Poland), Sveriges Television (Sweden), RTS (Switzerland), Minimax (Central Europe), and VRT (Belgium). In June 2016, Studio 100 announced it acquired the DVD and VoD rights to Mirette Investigates in German-speaking territories.

== Interactive features ==
Cyber Group founder Pierre Sissman said the show would have webisodes and websites, and tablet games requiring clues from the television series for solving investigations.
