= Zouzous =

French children's television programming block

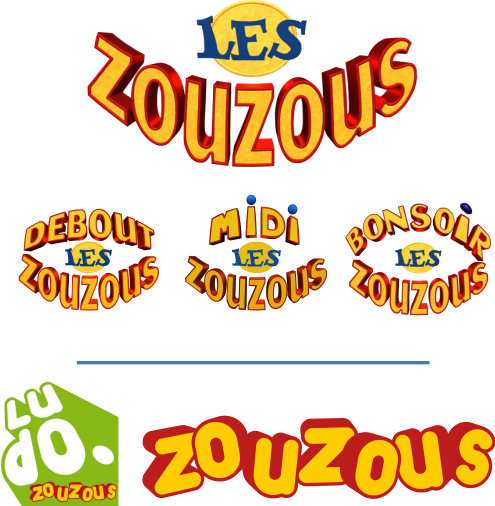
- Set of Zouzous programs logos.
- Network: La Cinquième then France 5 (1999–2019)
- Launched: 11 September 1999 (Les Zouzous); 19 December 2009 (Ludo Zouzous); 25 June 2011 (Zouzous)
- Closed: 18 December 2009 (Les Zouzous); 24 June 2011 (Ludo Zouzous); 8 December 2019 (Zouzous)
- Country of origin: France
- Owner: France Télévisions
- Headquarters: Issy-les-Moulineaux (Hauts-de-Seine, Ile-de-France); Paris 15th
- Formerly known as: Les Zouzous (1999–2009)
- Sister network: France 4
- Format: 4:3 (1999–2008); 16:9 (2008–2019)
- Running time: Zouzous (France 5): 105 min. (Monday) 130 min. (Tuesday-Friday) 210 min. (Saturday); Zouzous (France 4): 60 min. (Weekends) 50 min. (Saturday and Sunday)
- Original language(s): French
- Voices of: France 5: Mathilde Desgardin-Lamarre (female voiceover; 2009–2014) Diane Dassigny (replacement; 2009–2014) Olivier Blond (male voiceover); France 4: Celia Rosich (female voiceover) Unnamed male voiceover
- Official website: www.zouzous.fr

Zouzous, formerly Ludo Zouzous and Les Zouzous, was the children's brand of France Télévisions accompanying the preschool animated series on France 5 (then La Cinquième) from September 11, 1999, and on France 4 from March 31, 2014. Its replaced in 2019 by Okoo, a unitary brand of France Télévisions for all of their children programmes.

From 2009 to January 2011, Ludo Zouzous only aired in the morning, with Ludo airing at afternoon. After this date, it was broadcast during both slots. In June 2011, Ludo Zouzous became Zouzous.

== History ==
=== Les Zouzous ===
==== Debout les Zouzous ====
Created and broadcast on 11 September 1999, Debout les Zouzous was weekly before becoming daily from 6:50 a.m. to 9 a.m. from September 2000. Until 2005, the program was broadcast between each animation clip or one-minute sketch in form of poetry or even karaoke, often in the characters of the animated series Rolie Polie Olie. This program was intended for preschoolers since it broadcast cartoons such as Louie or even SamSam, unlike Midi les Zouzous and Bonsoir les Zouzous which broadcast animated series for older children.

==== Midi les Zouzous ====
This programme was created and aired on 5 November 2001, to replace the Cellulo programme, Monday to Friday from 12 p.m. to 1:35 p.m., and Saturday until June 2007. From 2002, the show was aimed at a wider audience around 1 p.m., including the broadcast of Japanese cartoons such as Olive and Tom, Princess Sarah, Diplodos, The Mysterious Cities of Gold, Magical Princess Minky Momo, Ulysses 31, and many more. The 1 p.m. box earned real success with the broadcasts of these Japanese anime from the 1970s, 1980s, and 1990s, then some unpublished cartoons.

==== Bonsoir les Zouzous ====
Created and broadcast on 9 September 2002, this program was broadcast from Monday to Sunday, over a time slot from 7:50 p.m. to 8:40 p.m. approximately. Subsequently, starting in 2007, it aired only during major school vacation periods and on weekends from 7:00 p.m. to 8:40 p.m. This show was broadcast only on cable and satellite until 2005, then on cable, satellite, ADSL, and DTT from 2005, since France 5 shared its channel with Arte at the time from 7 p.m. on the Hertzian network. The show discontinued airing on 30 August 2009.

==== Occasional broadcasts ====
France 5 sometimes broadcasts occasional Zouzous programs for specific events.

==== L'Été des Zouzous ====
Ephemeral program instead the programme C dans l'air, broadcast during the summer of 2004 on the occasion of the summer holidays, Monday to Friday from 5.50 p.m. to 6.55 p.m.

==== Joyeux Noël les Zouzous ====
Ephemeral program, broadcast during the 2007/2008 Christmas holidays in place of Debout les Zouzous, Midi les Zouzous and Bonsoir les Zouzous (only during the 2007 and 2008 Christmas holidays), with in particular a prime time on December 24 at 7 p.m. at 10:30 p.m. consisting of episodes of cartoons and special Christmas features.

=== Ludo Zouzous ===
Launched at Christmas 2009, on the occasion of the end-of-year celebrations on France 5 and on monludo.fr, Ludo Zouzous was the preschool label of France Télévisions' youth offer offering programs for toddlers from 3 to 6 years as Chloé Magique, Élasto Culbuto, etc. and their parents, broadcast without commercial interruption from Monday to Saturday at 6:50 a.m. then Monday to Friday at 12 p.m. (from January 2, 2011) on France 5. During the 2010 summer vacation and shortly after, Ludo Zouzous was also broadcast in the evening from 7 p.m., mainly to replace the Bonsoir les Zouzous program which had disappeared on August 30, 2009. The evening segment was also intended for 3 to 6 year olds, but it was broadcast only on cable, satellite, ADSL and DTT.

=== Zouzous ===
Launched on 25 June 2011 due to the breakup of the youth offer of France Télévisions (removal of the Ludo brand) and also during the summer holidays on France 5 and the zouzous.fr site (formerly monludo.fr from 2011 to 2013), Zouzous was the preschool label for France Télévisions' youth offer, programs for toddlers and their parents broadcast without advertising interruptions every morning on France 5 and at lunchtime on France 4. Chez Zouzous on France 5 as on France 4, advertising between cartoons did not exist. There has never been any advertising in the programs in the history of the Zouzous.

==== Rebroadcast ====
On March 31, 2014, France Télévisions remodeled its youth offer by making France 4 a channel dedicated to young people until 6:30 p.m. and to young adults (the "New Writings") in the evening. Zouzous becomes the "spearhead" of this new strategy by being rebroadcast from 31 March 2014 to 4 January 2015, all week in the afternoon and on weekends around noon.

The afternoon segment consisted of the Zouzous series rebroadcast at snack time and mainly aimed at children aged 3 to 6 with Mouk, Yakari, or Tales of Tatonka, Fireman Sam. From January 4, 2015, Zouzous on France 4 was no longer broadcast in the afternoon but in the noon hour, as was the case on France 5. Unlike the latter, this installment does not contain any classics (cartoons from the 1980s) and consisted mainly of cartoons formerly broadcast on France 5 (Mini-Loup, Fireman Sam, Bob the Builder).

== Deprogramming ==
Zouzous on France 4 was sometimes shortened or completely removed from the air for a few days (but this is rare) most often because of the sport (tennis, rugby...) that the channel broadcast (unlike France 5, which does not broadcast). Mainly, France 4 broadcast sports during the day during major events related to sports (Roland-Garros). This also concerned Ludo on France 3 and France 4.
