= Terrence Scammell =

Terrence Scammell may refer to:

- Terrence Scammell (British actor), born 1937
- Terrence Scammell (Canadian actor), born 1958
