= Sally Bollywood: Super Detective =

Animated television show

- Genre: Comedy; Children's; Mystery
- Created by: Pepper Sue; Elastik Jane
- Directed by: Jérémie Hoarau (S1); Alexis Ducord (S1); Eric Bastier (S2)
- Starring: Fily Keita; Alexandre Nguyen; François Jérosme; Danièle Hazan; Marie Diot; Marie Nonnenmacher; Gilbert Levy
- Composers: Nathalie Loriot; Franck Hedin; Nico Nocchi
- Countries of origin: France; Australia
- Original languages: French; English
- No. of seasons: 2
- No. of episodes: 104

Production
- Executive producer: Mr Manne
- Producers: Philippe Alessandri; Geoff Watson; Giorgio Welter
- Editors: Cyril Gastaud; Fabien Limousin
- Running time: 11 minutes
- Production companies: Tele Images Productions; Three's a Company

Original release
- Network: France 3 (France); Seven Network (S1) / 7Two (S2) (Australia)
- Release: 26 October 2009 – 18 December 2013

Sally Bollywood: Super Detective (known as simply Sally Bollywood) is an animated television show co-produced by the French company Tele Images Productions (formerly Tele Images Kids) and Three's a Company in Australia. The series was originally broadcast on France 3 in France and on Seven Network in Australia. Two series have been produced, each consisting of 52 11-minute episodes. Many networks air episodes in pairs, to fill a half-hour time slot.

== Overview ==
The series revolves around Sally Bollywood, a young 12-year-old Indian girl who lives in the city of Cosmopolis, where people of different nationalities and ethnic groups make up the population. Her father, Harry Bollywood, is a private detective, which has inspired Sally to start her own investigative service, Sally Bollywood Investigations (SBI), located in the basement of their home. Sally and her best friend Doowee McAdam generally investigate cases brought to them by their schoolmates by travelling around their local neighbourhood, with Sally using her skills of deduction and Doowee using technology he invents.

== Production ==
The series was developed in association with France 3 and Seven Network. It is co-produced by Tele Images Productions (formerly Tele Images Kids) and France Télévisions in France and Three's a Company in Australia, and distributed internationally by Zodiak Entertainment Distribution.

== Characters ==
=== Main ===
==== Current SBI members ====
- Sally Bollywood: An Indian girl detective. She investigates primarily by asking people questions. She has purple plum hair. She speaks with a British accent in the English dub. She's also a huge fan of the Fuzzy Frogs. She lives in Cosmopolis.
- Doowee MacAdam: A boy who is Sally's best friend. He assists Sally with her investigations, often by using technology invented by himself. He has red hair. He also likes the Fuzzy Frogs. He is of Scottish descent.

==== Former SBI members ====
- Jasmine Gupta: A girl who used to be the SBI's intern but got kicked out when she sorted Sally's papers incorrectly. She is snobbish and self centered. She is Rahani's sister and Alma is her best friend.

=== Supporting ===
==== Sally's parents ====
- Harry Bollywood: Sally's father, a private detective who inspired Sally to begin her own investigation service. He often worries about Sally taking on cases, but is honored that she has chosen to follow in his footsteps. He also has purple hair.
- Mrs. Apu: An older woman who is a friend of Harry. She acts as the Bollywoods' housekeeper and often offers advice to Sally, Doowee and other characters. She's sort of a mother figure for Sally. She also loves cooking and enjoys experimenting with new recipes.

==== Sally Bollywood's friends ====
This is a list of Sally's friends and classmates. Some have formed groups and clubs.

==== The Fuzzy Frogs ====
The Fuzzy Frogs is a school rock band. They used to be a boy band until the frogs realized how much Jenny wanted to be a member. The group makes rock music and has a huge following of mostly girls (although Doowee is a fan too). Groupies often mob them.

The following are current Fuzzy Frogs members:

- Tommy: Julie's brother
- Jeremy: The leader of the band
- Max
- Vanessa: A very good singer and participant in the school concert. She became a star within the school. Her stage name is Vanessa M.

===== Other recurring characters =====
- Lee: A boy and classmate of Sally and Doowee. His mother is a herbalist and owns a shop. After he was found sabotaging a swimming competition, Sally and Doowee discovered that Lee has six toes on each foot rather than five. Ironically, he ended up winning that swimming contest.
- Luna: Used to claim she was a sorceress and has an uncanny fascination of the spirit world. She also writes horror stories.
- Stephanie: The school's journalist
- Christina: Melody's best friend, Christina helps produce and prepare Melody's stage for live performances, acting as her personal assistant.
- Bridget Brickhouse: A girl best known in athletics. She's exceptionally strong, once even throwing Doowee onto a gym mat. However, she is quick-tempered and has terrible grades.
- Albert: A scientist, like Doowee, he often rivals him in science contests. Both he and Albert created particle analyzers. Albert also is of German ancestry and lisps.
- Mr. Bobby Shoebridge: A principal of Little Bombay Junior High. He gives Sally and Doowee tasks when things are going on around the school.
- Bob: A boy who is one of the school's biggest bullies
- Sam: A girl who loves drawing and making graffiti
- Achmed: An expert skateboarder and master of disguise.
- Nirmala Pashimbrana: A friend of Sally and Doowee who, despite being extremely shy, is so generous she never turns down a favor, and is very agile, as well as being quite a good dancer.
- Rahani Gupta: Jasmine's brother, and a lover of art. He once flirted with Christina, and it is rumored that they are or were in a relationship. He's also Sanjay's brother. Rahani is a really good cook too.
- Alma: A girl who is best friends with Jasmine and is also known for being extremely excitable. Sometimes, though, she can have a fierce temper, be rude and snobbish.
- Mr. Big: A former con man who also is a fortune teller. He later revealed to the SBI, though, that he simply tells his clients "what they want to hear." He is not very big.
- Stan: An eccentric boy who has weird tastes. He was revealed to have a pet rat and be the person behind internet phenomenon Blogger Boy, a popular blogger. He lets his little sister Ann borrow him whenever she wants.
- George: A popular boy. He has bad grades. Sally once had a crush on him. George also likes to garden. He is the older brother of Betty, and the two appear to be very close. He has black hair with a purple patch.
- Betty: A shy girl with black hair nearly covering her eyes. She becomes Sally and Dowee's friend after they help her with an investigation. She is the younger sister of George, and the two appear to be very close. Betty gets upset when faced with the threat of her brother transferring schools.
- Jaya Madurpore: The daughter of Mrs. Madurpore, Jaya is a smart student who comes to the SBI after losing her 'lucky charm'. She is shown to be a bit bossy and has green hair and green eyes.
- Indira Madurpore (née Kooptur) a.k.a. Mrs. Madurpore: A biology teacher at Sally and Dowee's school. She is the mother of Jaya and is shown to be quite strict at times. She has very dark green hair.
- Cassie: A girl who moved to the neighborhood. She once lied about having a cat hoping to gain friends, but Sally blows her cover. Luckily, Naomi showed sympathy for her. She can be bossy at times, but usually gets along with other people. She also has pink hair with clips.

== Episodes ==
Series	Episodes	Originally released	
Series	Episodes	First released	Last released
1	52	26 October 2009	31 March 2011
2	52	7 September 2012	18 December 2013

== International broadcasts ==
Germany - Toggo (Super RTL)

== Episode list ==
=== Season 1 (2009–11) ===
No. in season	Title	Air date (Australia)
1	"Cockroach Capers"	14 August 2010
Sally's father bans her from detective work. She disobeys him, however, and investigates a mysterious cockroach snatcher, with Doowee's assistance. Meanwhile, Sally's father is looking for a pick pocketer. Culprits: Bob and a crook. Note: This is the first episode of the series.
2	"Trapped by the Internet"	17 August 2010
Sally and Doowee attempt to find out who is placing digitally manipulated images on Blogger Boy's blog to shame him. Once users click the image, a virus is downloaded. The virus spread across the world. Culprit: Renan.
3	"Talent Will Out"	17 August 2010
When the performances of other contestants, including Sally's, get ruined at a talent show, she then deals with many suspects as she tries to determine who is sabotaging the rest of the performers. Culprit: Devindra.
4	"SOS Saris!"	17 August 2010
The saris of the Indian dance troupe have been stolen, so the dancers ask the S.B.I. to investigate. But Sally and Doowee suspect different people, so they have a disagreement and conduct separate investigations. Culprit: Nirmala.
5	"Window Pains"	28 August 2010
After three windows are broken at school, the Principal's son asks Sally to investigate. However, she questions his intentions when she learns the Principal has already found the culprit. They later discover that the principal's son is a secret skateboarder and the boy the principal caught outside the school was skateboarding with the principal's son. And the girl who they see is behind all of this. Culprit: Erna.
6	"Chemical Reaction"	28 August 2010
Sally and Doowee investigate the theft of a fellow student's chemistry books while Sally is in tension due to her chemistry test. Culprit: Alex.
7	"Trouble at the Museum"	4 September 2010
A very pretty girl, Sinitta, is accused of stealing sweets at a modern art museum, and she wants the S.B.I. to prove her innocence. Sally does not trust Sinitta and does not want to take the case, but Doowee is charmed by the pretty girl, and insists that they investigate. It turns out that Sally was right. The case is a trap set by Sinitta’s uncle, who wants to get Harry off his case. Culprit: Sinitta (along with the help of her uncle and two crooks).
8	"Double Trouble"	4 September 2010
Doowee invents a camera that makes masks of pupil after clicking their photos. Later, Sally is accused of stealing a teacher's purse and is suspended from school. Now Sally is secretly investigating. Culprit: Joseph.
9	"Don't Touch My Lucky Charm"	11 September 2010
Jaya, the best student in the class, has lost her good luck charm – right before a couple of important exams. She doesn’t feel confident enough to sit the exams without her charm, so she asks Sally and Doowee to investigate. At first, they suspect one of the teachers, Mrs. Madurpore, who is Jaya’s mother, but eventually they discover that the culprit is Jaya’s next door neighbour, a bad student who hoped to do well in the exams thanks to Jaya’s lucky charm. Culprit: Jessica (because she threw the lucky charm in the sewer where an alligator kept it while trying to confess Sally and Doowee that she was the one who stole Jaya's lucky charm).
10	"Mr. Big"	11 September 2010
The S.B.I. faces strong competition after a rival agency, Mr. Big Detective Agency, has been stealing their clients. Culprit: Mr. Big (he was committing the crimes he was then pretending to solve, so that he could cover it all up)
11	"George's Forced Labour"	18 September 2010
George, the most popular boy, is being blackmailed to do maths assignments after someone clicks his photo with his toy while sleeping. Not wanting to ruin his image, he comes to S.B.I. to investigate his case. They are able to find who was collecting his assignments. But, the real culprit is still unknown. Will they be able to find out? Culprit: Betty.
12	"From Bombay with Love"	18 September 2010
A famous TV star, yet a furious actor, Kareena Kahn asks Sally and Doowee to investigate after someone starts clicking her photos and been sending them to media to troll on her personality. Culprit: Wendy.
13	"The Case of the Missing Cat"	25 September 2010
Cassie, a new girl at school, becomes very popular when she boasts about her beautiful cat. However, when her friends ask to see it, the cat suddenly goes missing. Cassie then asks the S.B.I. to investigate her missing cat. But later on, Cassie revealed that she has no cat, and she also reveals that she made all of this up to the S.B.I. because she wanted to seem more interesting and to make friends. Culprit: Cassie.
14	"Cousin Bouleh"	25 September 2010
Sally's cousin, Bouleh, is due to return to India after staying with Sally for several days. Sally is glad that he is going because she found him very annoying. Unfortunately, however, Bouleh's plane ticket has suddenly gone missing! If Sally doesn't find them soon, she will have to put up with her cousin for several more days. Culprit: Alice.
15	"Room with a Curse"	2 October 2010
Vanille is terrified. She believes her bedroom is haunted by the spirit of a local legend. Sally, the pragmatist doesn't believe in ghosts and is determined to solve the mystery. However, she comes face to face with the ghost who is telling her to leave the room. Everybody has one question in mind, "Is this room cursed?" Culprit: Bill.
16	"Operation Nerd"	2 October 2010
Against the background of the election of the school's most popular student, Sally and Doowee have to uncover the identity of whoever is supplying the school students with highly sophisticated cheat notes. While doing so they have to disguise themselves as nerds, which is making their popularity quite low. Culprit: Nigel.
17	"Bus Stop"	9 October 2010
Before their class ski trip, someone has tampered with the bus, and it's up to Sally and Doowee to find the solution before their trip is canceled. Culprit: Ernest.
18	"Liz's Secret Diary"	9 October 2010
Someone has broken into some of the school lockers and has taken Liz's diary. The suspect is now posting each page from the diary to expose and humiliate Liz for unknown reasons. Sally and Doowee must search for the diary while at the same time dealing with one of their most uncooperative and meanest client yet. Culprit: Maria.
19	"The White Bear"	16 October 2010
Louis' dog along with his dad's diamond, the "White Bear" goes missing. Louis then approaches the S.B.I. to investigate his case of the missing dog and his dad's diamond. However, the case may be more than just of the dog and the diamond. Culprits: Two burglars.
20	"The Guardians"	16 October 2010
A group of kids dressed up as superheroes from a graphic novel have been creating chaos during the night in the alleys. To uncover the troublers, Sally disguises herself as UltraGirl. But she is expelled from the group. Can she gain their trust and find their identities? Culprit: Dennis.
21	"The Dating Agency"	23 October 2010
Sally’s and Doowee’s mathematics teacher, Ms. Smith, has been behaving strangely and day-dreaming in class, getting the students marks confused and giving them detentions when they complain. When the S.B.I. investigate, they discover that Ms. Smith's problem is that she is in love. But, the man she has a crush on, Mr. Jerome, the sports teacher, doesn't seem to be noticing her. Doowee and Sally try to match-make the two teachers, but soon discover that running a dating agency is more difficult than investigating. Culprits: Mr. Jerome and Ms. Smith.
22	"Go Kart Wars"	2 November 2010
While practicing for a go-kart race at the school, Mika, the school's favorite go-kart race driver, loses control of his kart and crashes. Believing it to be sabotage, Mika asks the S.B.I. to investigate. While Doowee looks into the cause of the crash, Sally tries to establish a list of suspects. However, their investigation is hampered by Stephanie, a journalist from the school paper who, looking for a big scoop, attaches herself to the S.B.I. Culprit: Stephanie.
23	"The Killer Curry"	2010
When a Grade-A student, Nigel gets bad grades on his report card, he was punished and it was up to Sally to find out where his real report card is. They suspect that Bridget, Nigel's rival is the one who has switched his report card when he and Bridget got their report cards at class. But after a series of harshful events, she gives up. Just then, they discover that the curry from the school's cook, Marchelo has been stolen. And the S.B.I. must find out why. Culprits: Bridget and a burglar.
24	"Serial Thief"	Unknown
Someone has cleaned up all the pencils that belongs to Sam and were now shrunk. Sam asks the S.B.I. to figure out how this happen. They suspect some students that were responsible for this incident, But, no one listens. Until with the help of Sally's pen pal, Anna. They finally found out who's the real person responsible for this cause. Culprit: Cristelle.
25	"Cold Case"	Unknown
Someone is breaking the trophy case in school. So the S.B.I. help the innocent school janitor, Mr. Cubbins to find out who did it. They investigate that last night, a man who is told not to kick the ball in the hallway was a strange man who was the one who accidentally break the trophy case and secretly hides one trophy to make it like a theft. So, Sally and Doowee must find out that he's the one who actually did it while blaming Mr. Cubbins for the damage. Culprit: Basil Postlethwaite.
26	"That's Rock 'N' Roll"	6 November 2010
A high school rock band, the Fuzzy Frogs, discover that one of their songs has been plagiarized by a TV star, Dizzie Mulligan. Despite the band’s protests that their song has been stolen, Mulligan insists that it is his own work. Sally and Doowee have to prove that the song has been illegally copied and try to find out who did it. Culprit: Vanessa.
27	"The Walls of Cosmopolis"	Unknown
Someone is doing graffiti in one of the walls in Cosmopolis. Sam comes to the S.B.I. to find out who is causing the scene. But, they later find out that a cranky old neighbor was the one who did it for real. Culprit: Mr. Helmart.
28	"The Delayed Action Chili Pepper"	Unknown
Someone is sabotaging the spaghetti lunch that the students are having at the cafeteria. Marchelo asks Sally and Doowee that they need to investigate about someone who is sabotaging his food. Also, the students get their taste buds burned off because of the incident. After that, the students (along with Doowee) were taken to a hospital and Marchelo asks Sally about a student who is behind the incident put a spicy ingredient in the food when he and the students are not looking. Sally then knows that it was revealed to be a spicy chili pepper that an unknown student put in there before the students were about to eat the food. So it's up to Sally to stop the person from corrupting a crime. Culprit: Lee Wang.
29	"The Attack of the Giant Chicken"	Unknown
Jason is having horrible nightmares about a giant chicken and gets the S.B.I. to figure out why he might be having them. This is proven to be a tough case as Sally and Doowee must study new means of investigating, hypnosis. And they will try to find the one who is being a chicken in Jason's nightmares. Culprit: Zoe.
30	"Art For Art's Sake"	Unknown
When someone steals Edna's famous portrait. She calls the S.B.I. to find her missing portrait. But then, they reveal that the two boys are the ones who both stole her portrait. Will the S.B.I. and Edna stop them from taking her portrait? Culprits: Sanjay and Rahani.
31	"The S.B.I. Sees Double"	Unknown
Someone broke into Kevina's locker and stole her scrunchies and she quickly visits the S.B.I. to report this. They see Leo who also helps them two about who is the real thief broken into Kevina's locker. And they actually found the culprit, who is Leo himself. Because he is the one who broke into his girlfriend, Kevina's locker. The reason why he steals the scrunchies for Kevina is that he wanted her to notice him when he found them. And the one who is also behind it was none other than, Leo's twin brother, Tiger. Because he's the one who is responsible for the crime scene at school too. But in the end, Leo was forgiven by Kevina. But, now she falls in love with his twin brother, Tiger. Much to his and the S.B.I.'s dismay. Culprits: Leo and Tiger.
32	"Bling Bling"	Unknown
Someone stole all the gold in Cosmopolis. Sacha enters the S.B.I. in an investigation about somebody who stole all the gold in the town. They found the culprit, who revealed to be a rap student who likes gold. Culprit: Paul.
33	"Close Protection"	Unknown
Francis, a Fantasy game player, commissions the SBI for a special mission: to protect him when he goes to the "Fantastik" cards contest, so rivals can’t steal his best cards. Sally is really happy to take on the protection-case, but Doowee is worried that they won’t be strong enough if they meet some big bullies. However, Sally is sure that to be effective bodyguards, they just need to outsmart any foes, rather than out-fight them - and she seeks some strategic advice from her father. Culprit: Dennis.
34	"Mrs. Apu's Old Friend"	Unknown
It's almost Christmas in Cosmopolis! Everyone is having fun on the jolly day that Santa Claus will deliver presents to the nice people and coal to the naughty people. Everybody is having fun, all except for one. An unknown stranger who sneaks into the basement and steals a very special Santa suit in the chest. The next day, It's Christmas Eve. Sally and Doowee are so excited that it's almost Christmas and they can't wait to see Santa and have their best Christmas ever by also waiting to open their presents and eat figgy pudding too. But things are going awry when Mrs. Apu starts talking to them about her old friend, who hasn't see him for several days since they first met. So, Sally, along with her best friend, Doowee investigate what's in this case. When they visit the old man's house, they find him very upset because somebody has stolen his rare Santa suit he always wear every Christmas. Without it, he can't deliver presents to the children and adults of the town. So, The S.B.I. set out to find the thief by inviting all the department store Santas to a party, to see the one who is wearing the missing suit. Culprit: Kevin. Note: This is the series' first Christmas special.
35	"High School Musical Mystery"	Unknown
TBA. Culprit: Alma. Note: This episode is a parody of the 2006 original movie on Disney Channel, High School Musical, and this is the second episode to have singing due to the episode being a musical.
36	"The Formidable Miss Chicago"	Unknown
When Ms. Smith starts to get angry at two of her students for being too noisy, she quits teaching and is replaced by a substitute teacher, Miss Chicago. She starts to turn her class into a somewhat of a military camp and strictly treats her students like soldiers. So, the S.B.I. helps two kids, Rahani and Alex to end this "Miss Chicago" thing before it gets any worse for the school. But then, Ms. Chicago meets the S.B.I. outside. As the S.B.I. figures this, will they get the old Ms. Smith back? Culprit: Ms. Smith (as Miss Chicago)
37	"The Midnight Stitch-Up"	Unknown
TBA. Culprit: The Lunch Lady.
38	"The Shy Mystery"	Unknown
TBA. Culprit: Jaya.
39	"Halloween Heist"	Unknown
TBA. Culprits: Jaya, Nirmala and Lee Wang. Note: This is the series' first halloween special.
40	"Mr. Big Returns"	Unknown
When somebody steals Doowee's future telling machine and Mr. Big's crystal ball. Mr. Big (formerly the founder of the rival agency) goes to the S.B.I. to find out who stole his lucky crystal ball and Doowee's future telling machine. So, they find out the culprit who is responsible for taking both of Mr. Big and Doowee's stuff. And the culprit is... Culprit: Jason.
41	"Doowee's Luck Runs Out"	Unknown
Cristelle needs help from the S.B.I. when her blueberries go missing. Sally and Doowee investigate for the thief. However, Doowee's equipments continuously malfunction. With no idea how his gadgets are faulting, Doowee concludes that he is bad luck. But his friends, Sally and Cristelle don't think that he has bad luck. It was somebody who's the one doing all of this, A girl who has a crush on him. Culprit: Emma.
42	"The Party"	Unknown
Cassie is having a party for high-level students only. Just then, the party is crashed by four kids, who are then chased away by Cassie's grandma. Sally is called to investigate, but scolds Cassie for not inviting her to her party. It gets worse when she realizes that her friend, Doowee was invited. She was shocked by this and storms out. But, when Doowee explains that the party was actually pretty boring, the two reconcile. And they start investigating. They find out that the culprit was actually Cassie's younger brother, David. Who explains that he was the one who's not invited to his older sister's party because he's too young. Cassie then apologizes to her little brother and they reconcile. Culprits: Matt, Renan, Phil and David.
43	"The Client in the Clouds"	Unknown
TBA. Culprits: Vanille and Jeremy.
44	"Call My Lawyer"	Unknown
Someone has come in the kitchen to sabotage the cake baking competition by eating and ruining the cakes made. Sally Bollywood and Doowee McAdam came to the school to prepare for the cake baking contest, but all of a sudden, Lee Wang came and explain that there was a sabotage. When they arrive at the kitchen, there was a big mess of their cakes ruined. However, Sally's cake was not ruined for some reason. Sally and Doowee take on the case to find out who is sabotaging the cake-baking competition. And they get Albert, Louis and Jessica with them. And the culprits are... Culprits: Bob, Angus (who is Bob's lawyer) and Ferret (who was disguised as a spy).
45	"The Stink Bomb"	Unknown
TBA. Culprit: Stanley.
46	"The Egg War"	Unknown
There are eggs everywhere in Ms. Smith's classroom, and she punishes the whole class for the incident. Cindy and Bob were the top 2 kids who weren't okay with this. They said to Sally Bollywood and Doowee McAdam that they don't want to keep this going and they asked Sally and Doowee to investigate who's actually causing this mess. They suspected different people, but 9 of them are responsible for it. And the culprits are... Culprits: Melvin, Phil, Lee Wang, Betty, Bridget, Cassie, Jason, Sacha and Jessica (because all 9 of them started the egg war at school in the first place).
47	"The Fortune Teller"	Unknown
TBA. Culprit: Alex Lex.
48	"Two Heads are Better than One"	Unknown
Someone ripped off Stephanie's presidential election poster off the election board. Stephanie quickly asked Sally Bollywood and Doowee McAdam to investigate on who is coming to expose her. They suspected Oliver, Stephanie's election rival, who confessed that he's the one who did it. But he denies this because if he was the one who did it, then he would be disqualified in the election for ripping Stephanie's poster. Then they suspect Andy, who was an excellent helper to Stephanie. But he also denies this, because he's super busy on helping Stephanie win the election. Then they suspect Jenny, who is Stephanie's ex-helper. But she asks the S.B.I. and Stephanie about someone who came in school last night who was the one who revealed to ripped Stephanie's poster. And that criminal happens to be... Andy. Because he's the one who ripped Stephanie's poster so he wouldn't get credit for Stephanie and he did it for revenge. So, since Andy was the one who did it, Stephanie forgives him and they won the election. Culprit: Andy.
49	"Caught Red Handed"	Unknown
When Sally and Doowee accidentally get detention after finding an empty can of red paint on the floor, they get blamed for it. They investigate who did it so they can prove their innocence. Culprit: Ferret.
50	"The Missing Stamp"	Unknown
TBA. Culprit: Cassie.
51	"Stranger than Fiction"	Unknown
TBA. Culprit: Albert.
52	"International Day"	Unknown
TBA. Culprit: a Monkey. Note: This episode is the season 1 finale.

=== Season 2 (2012–13) ===
No. overall	No. in season	Title	Air date (Australia)
53	1	"Rock n Roll Dad"	7 September 2012
Things keep going wrong at the Fuzzy Frogs’ performances. Somebody is clearly sabotaging the young band, so they hire the SBI to investigate. Sally and Doowee check out the usual suspects – an ex-band member, a former back-up singer and some avid fans – without finding the culprit. When the band’s new guitarist, the father of one of the band members, is late for an important gig, Doowee has to take his place – but he has no musical talent whatsoever! However, Doowee’s unique guitar solo saves the gig – while Sally uncovers who the real saboteur is. Culprit: Julie.
54	2	"Comic Book Caper"	14 September 2012
At a school flea market, someone steals a prized comic book and runs off with it. Sally and Doowee chase after the thief, who tosses the comic and gets away. Sally and Doowee retrieve the comic and give it back to the owner. Case solved? Far from it. The owner says this is not his original comic – but a counterfeit! The SBI track down the thief, but she says she didn’t swap comics and doesn’t have the original. Meanwhile, a collector has arrived who is willing to pay a big price for the comic. The SBI have to race against time to find the culprit and the comic before the collector leaves. Culprit: Melvin.
55	3	"Performing Magic"	28 September 2012
Devindra, a boy magician, makes Stan the goth’s pet rat disappear, but can’t make it reappear! Stan asks the SBI to investigate and they draw up a list of possibilities: Devindra stole the rat to use in his act; a rival magician sabotaged his act; or a cat ate it. However, Devindra claims he really did make the mouse disappear, because he is magic – thanks to a special meteorite with mysterious powers. The SBI investigate the meteorite and a rival magician, but when Sally recreates Devindra’s disappearing act, she reveals that the real culprit is much closer to home. Culprit: Ann.
56	4	"New Teacher"	17 December 2012
57	5	"The Sorceress"	18 December 2012
58	6	"Muckraking"	24 December 2012
59	7	"Poster Boy"	25 December 2012
60	8	"Exchange Student"	8 January 2013
61	9	"The Crystal Guitar"	22 January 2013
62	10	"Ancient History"	TBA
63	11	"Night At The Museum"	TBA
64	12	"The Sad Clown Gang"	TBA
65	13	"Everyone's a Private Eye"	TBA
66	14	"Burglary 2.0"	TBA
67	15	"The Black Sheep"	TBA
68	16	"The Haunted House"	TBA
69	17	"The Big Stink"	TBA
70	18	"Storm Clouds over the SBI"	TBA
71	19	"Pet Sitting"	TBA
72	20	"Crime Flash"	TBA
73	21	"Missing Mobiles"	TBA
74	22	"Eye in the Sky"	TBA
75	23	"Whodunnit"	TBA
76	24	"Stolen Clothes"	
77	25	"Singing & Dancing Sally"	TBA
78	26	"Sally's Circus"	TBA
79	27	"Camp of Doom"	TBA
80	28	"A Bird in the Hand"	TBA
81	29	"Detention"	TBA
82	30	"Serial Treachery"	TBA
83	31	"Starry Eyed"	TBA
84	32	"Miss Mystery"	TBA
85	33	"Pyjama Party"	TBA
86	34	"Sally's Pen Pal"	TBA
87	35	"Too Many Cooks"	TBA
88	36	"The White Knight"	TBA
89	37	"Fangs a Lot"	TBA
90	38	"Ripped off Rap"	TBA
91	39	"Party Pooper"	TBA
92	40	"Doowee's Urn"	TBA
93	41	"Beauty Pageant"	TBA
94	42	"Ring My Bell"	TBA
95	43	"Catch Me If You Can"	TBA
96	44	"The Invincible Racer"	TBA
97	45	"Dinosaur Danger"	TBA
98	46	"New Girl"	6 November 2013
99	47	"All Made Up"	13 November 2013
100	48	"Asphalt Jungle"	20 November 2013
101	49	"Birthday Surprise"	27 November 2013
102	50	"Champion"	4 December 2013
103	51	"Hot Potatoes"	11 December 2013
104	52	"Fundraising Felony"	18 December 2013

== See also ==
- Mira, Royal Detective
