= BreakThru Films =

Polish film production company

- Type: Private
- Industry: Motion pictures
- Founded: 2002
- Founder: Hugh Welchman
- Headquarters: Sopot, Poland,
- Key people: Sean Bobbitt (CEO); Dorota Kobiela (CCO)
- Website: www.breakthrufilms.pl

BreakThru Films is an independent film production company based in Sopot in Poland. Founded in 2002 by Hugh Welchman and initially based in the United Kingdom. The company concentrated mostly in the production of short films, animation, documentary and live-stage shows but has since focused mainly on feature films. Their 2006 short film Peter and the Wolf was awarded an Academy Award for Best Animated Short Film and their 2017 feature film Loving Vincent was Academy nominated for Academy Award for Best Animated Feature.

== History ==
BreakThru Films was founded in 2002 by Hugh Welchman, initially producing a number of short films before diversifying into feature, animation and theatre-based projects.

In 2007, they produced Alex, a stage show based on the Daily Telegraph comic strip of the same name, that combined live performances and animation. It premiered in London West End in Autumn 2007 and has since been touring in Sydney, Hong Kong, Singapore and Dubai.

In 2008, the BreakThru animated short, Peter and the Wolf, won an Academy Award for Best Short Film (Animated). They have also produced a number of live-action films, such as Scratch and The Last Thakur, as well as The Flying Machine, a film which combines live-action and stop-motion animation, and stars Heather Graham and Lang Lang.

As well as developing their own productions, BreakThru have served as Visual Effects producers for La Vie En Rose, and were the UK distributor for the 2006 animated film, Free Jimmy.

Since 2012, BreakThru films has been based in the tricity area of Poland, with main production of Loving Vincent being completed in Gdańsk.

=== Loving Vincent ===
In 2017, Breakthru Films released Loving Vincent, the world's first fully painted feature film, completed in the painting style of Vincent van Gogh. Initial production of the film began in 2012 after the idea was picked up by BreakThru, based on director Dorota Kobiela's concept for a short film that told the story of Vincent van Gogh's life through his moving paintings. Together with finding appropriate painters and training them, live action shooting and actual painting for the film, the project took 5 years to complete and was finished by early 2017. It was then shown for the first time at the Annecy International Animated Film Festival in June 2017. The film went on to receive numerous awards as well as Oscar, Golden Globe and BAFTA nominations.

In early 2019 a documentary film about Loving Vincent came out called Loving Vincent: The Impossible Dream.

== Production and distribution ==
- The Clap (2005)
- Peter and the Wolf (2006)
- Free Jimmy (2006) — Distributor
- La Vie En Rose (2007) — Special Effects Company
- The Last Thakur (2008)
- Scratch (2010)
- Battle for Britain (2010)
- Papa's Boy (2011)
- The Flying Machine (2011)
- Hound (2014-2018) — Original publisher
- Loving Vincent (2017)
- The Peasants (2023)
- A Winter's Journey (TBA)
