= Scratch (2010 film) =

- Directed by: Jakob Rørvik
- Written by: Jakob Rørvik
- Produced by: Tamsin Lyons; Yngve Sæther
- Starring: Viktoria Winge; Luke Treadaway
- Cinematography: Sebastián Sarraute
- Edited by: Benjamin Binderup
- Distributed by: BreakThru Films; Motlys
- Release date: 17 January 2010
- Running time: 35 minutes
- Countries: United Kingdom; Norway
- Language: English

Scratch is a short film directed by Jakob Rørvik, and stars Viktoria Winge and Luke Treadaway.

== Plot ==
Scratch follows Lena, an art student who is living in London. She searches for inspiration for her art project and finds it in Sol. He is a scruffy young man who drifts around, engaging in seemingly detached relationships with a variety of people. Lena begins to follow Sol, gaining a voyeur's perspective on the young man's life, and taking pictures of him when he is unaware. Things take a wrong turn when Sol discovers her. He is fascinated by her odd behaviour, and so Sol is now the one following her. The two form a strange relationship, gradually exposing each other's dreams, fears and lies.

== Awards ==
In March 2010, Scratch won the Best Short Fiction award at the Aubagne Film Festival.
