= Hugh Welchman =

British filmmaker, screenwriter, and producer

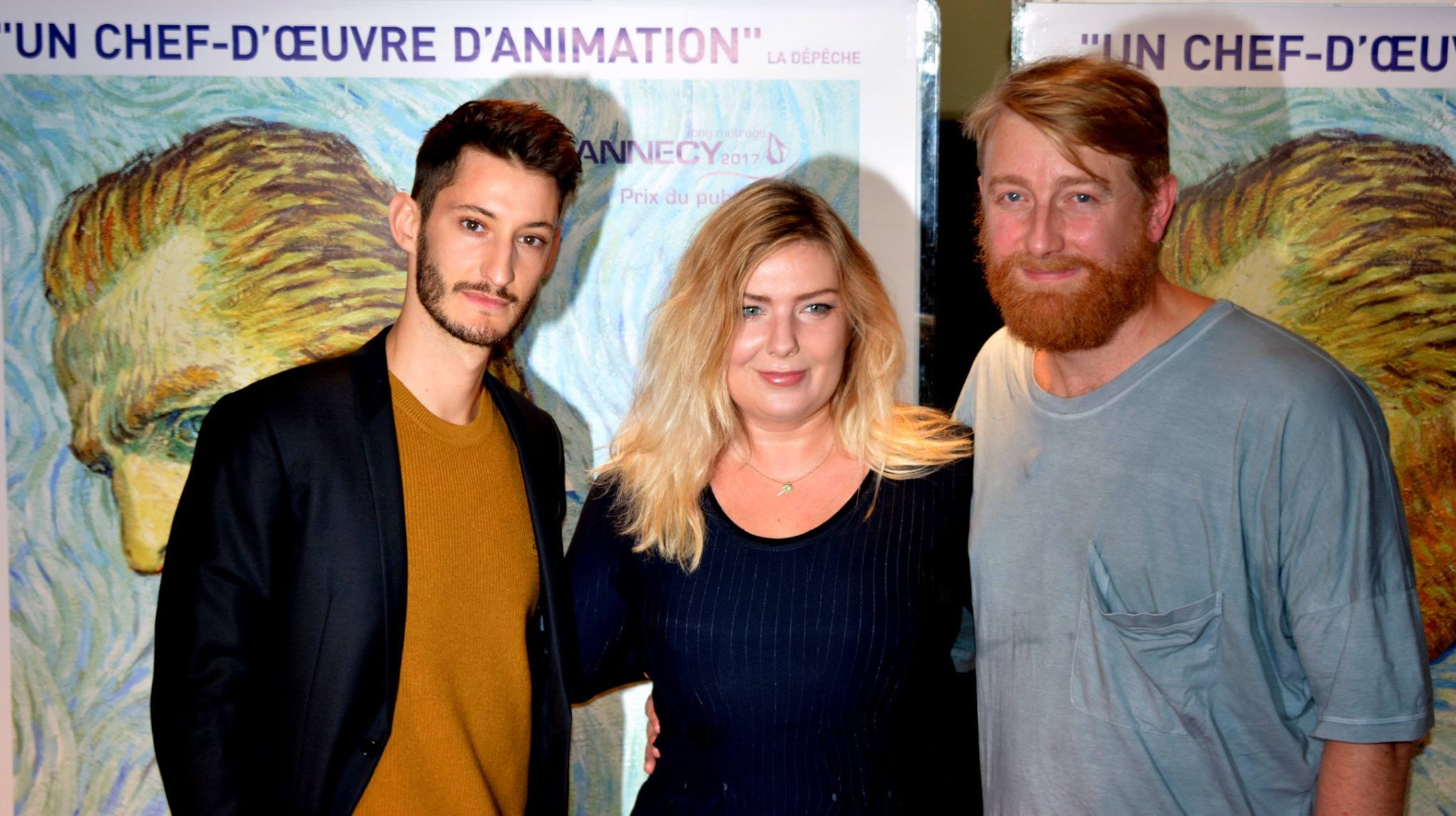
The actor Pierre Niney with Dorota Kobiela, who devised Loving Vincent, and Welchman (right)

Hugh Stewart Jasper Welchman (born February 1975) is a British filmmaker, screenwriter, and producer.

== Life and career ==
Welchman comes from Bracknell in Berkshire and attended the Dolphin School in nearby Hurst until moving on to Keble College, Oxford during the 1990s and graduated with a degree from Oxford University in politics, philosophy and economics (PPE).

In 2002, Welchman founded the film company BreakThru Films. This led to him becoming the joint winner of the Academy Award for Best Animated Short Film in 2007. This was for the 2006 film Peter and the Wolf. The other winner was the film's director Suzie Templeton.

Welchman edited the graphic novel Hound (2014-2018) by Paul J. Bolger and Barry Devlin.

Welchman co-directed the first fully painted animated feature film Loving Vincent (2017) with Dorota Kobiela. In 2023, he co-directed another fully painted animated feature film, The Peasants, with Dorota Kobiela.
