= The Roulin Family =

Collection of Van gogh paintings at the Barnes Foundation

Portrait of the Postman Joseph Roulin (1841–1903) F432
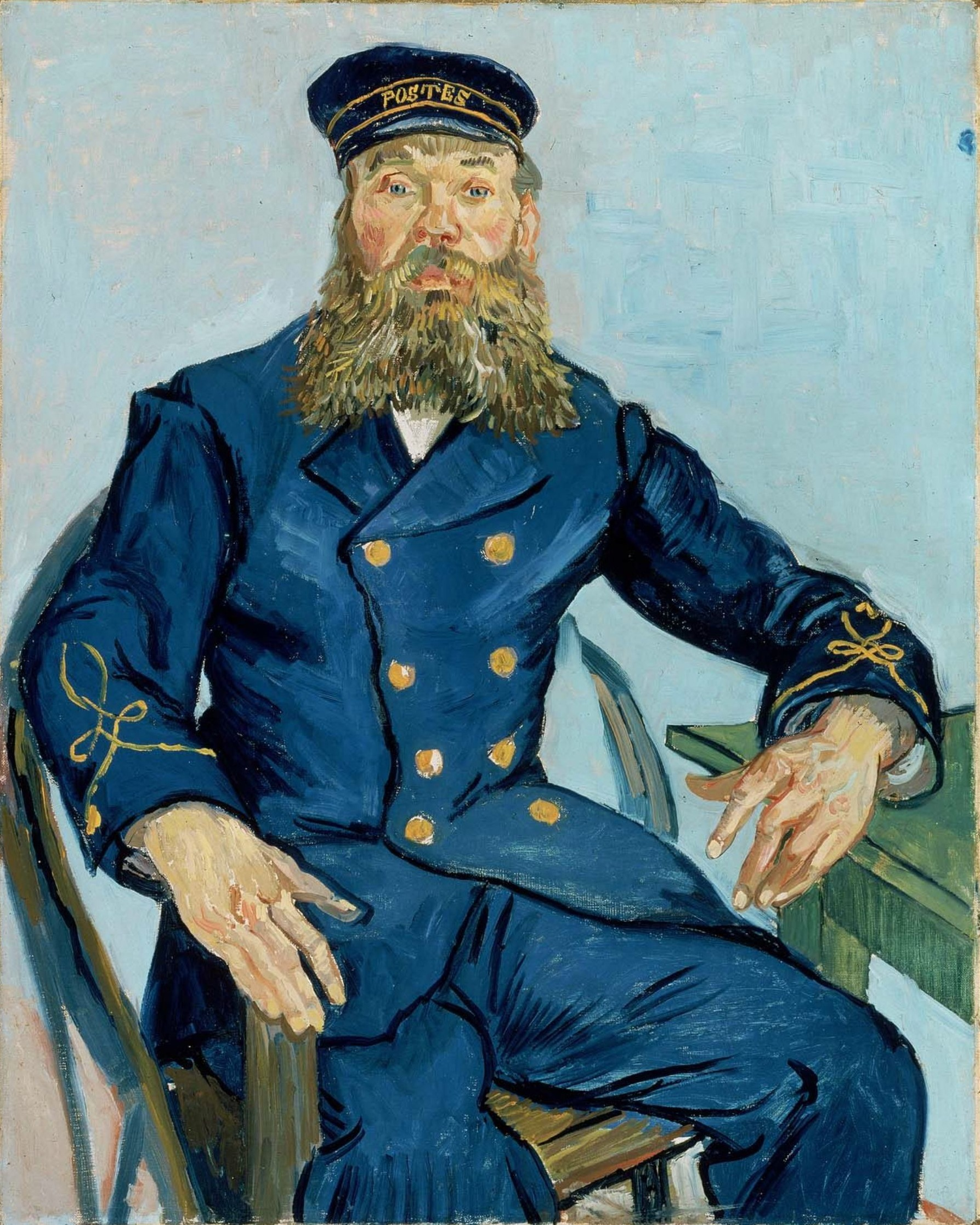
- First painting of Joseph Roulin
- Artist: Vincent van Gogh
- Year: early August, 1888
- Medium: Oil on canvas
- Dimensions: 81.3 cm × 65.4 cm (32.0 in × 25.7 in)
- Location: Museum of Fine Arts, Boston

The Roulin Family is a group of portrait paintings Vincent van Gogh executed in Arles in 1888 and 1889 of Joseph, his wife Augustine and their three children: Armand, Camille, and Marcelle. This series is unique in many ways. Although Van Gogh loved to paint portraits, it was difficult for financial and other reasons for him to find models. So, finding an entire family that agreed to sit for paintings — in fact, for several sittings each — was a bounty.

Joseph Roulin became a friend to Van Gogh during his stay in Arles. Representing a man he admired was important to him. The family, with children ranging in age from four months to seventeen years, also gave him the opportunity to produce works of individuals in several different stages of life.

Rather than pursuing realism, Van Gogh used his imagination, colours, and themes artistically and creatively to evoke desired emotions from the audience.

== Background ==
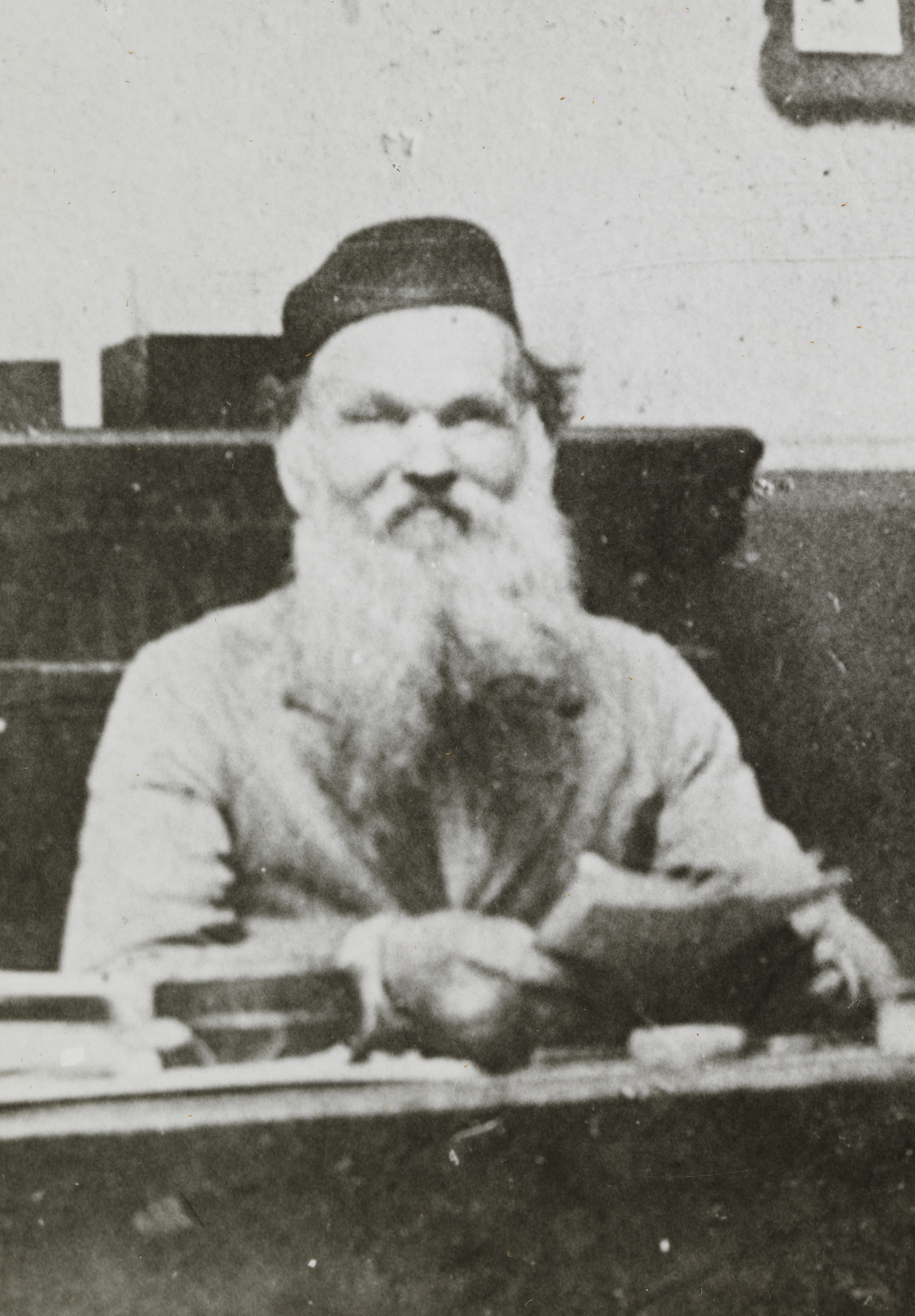
Joseph Roulin in 1902

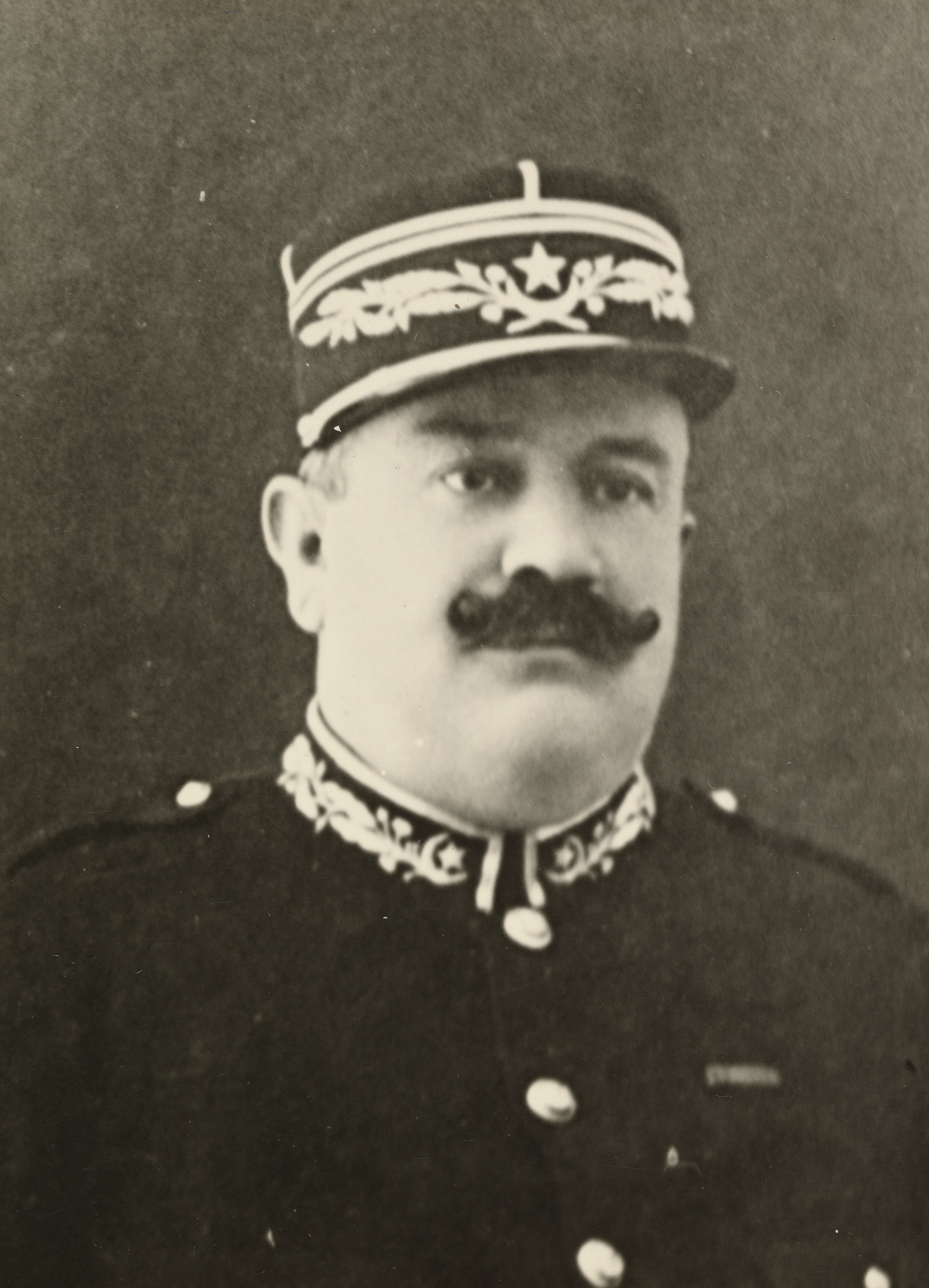
Armand Roulin in 1921

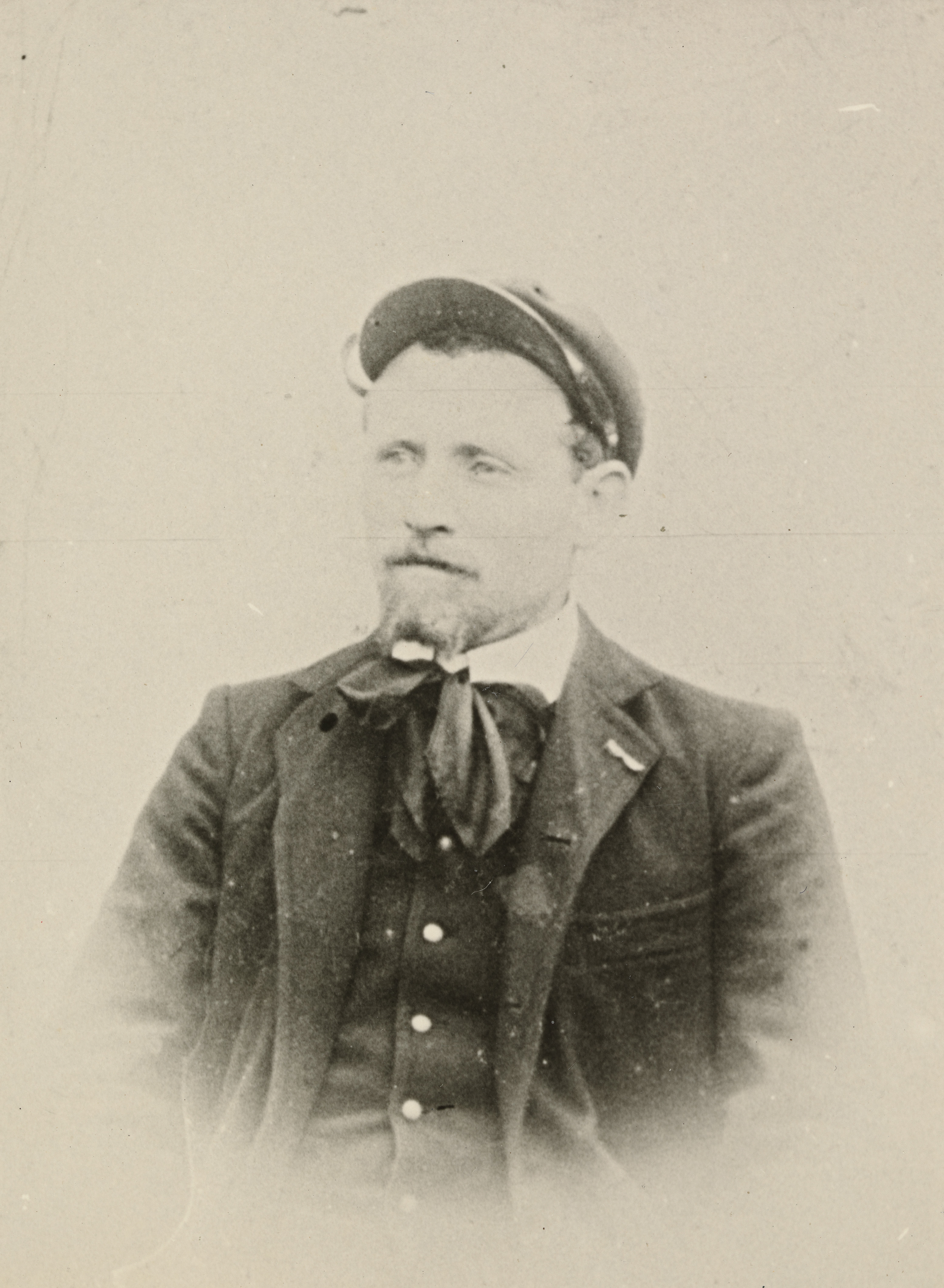
Camille Roulin in 1909

Photographs of members of the Roulin family

In February 1888, Van Gogh left Paris for Arles, a small town in southern France. The house he lived in was the subject of his painting The Yellow House. He had difficulties making friends in the area but became acquainted with postman Joseph Roulin. Van Gogh and Roulin drank at a café owned by Marie Ginoux and were described as "like brothers" by Marie Ginoux. Roulin helped Van Gogh recover after he mutilated his left ear. Roulin wrote to Theo, paid Van Gogh's rent, and made sure that he received treatment at a psychiatric hospital.

His paintings represented different aspects of ordinary life, such as portraits of members of the Roulin family. The sunflower paintings, some of the most recognizable of Van Gogh's paintings, were created at this time. He worked continuously to keep up with his ideas for paintings. This is likely one of Van Gogh's happier periods of life. He is confident, clear-minded, and seemingly content.

In a letter to Theo he wrote, "Painting as it is now, promises to become more subtle – more like music and less like sculpture – and above all, it promises colour." As a means of explanation, Vincent explains that being like music means being comforting.

== Portrait ==
Van Gogh, known for his landscapes, seemed to find painting portraits his greatest ambition. He said of portrait studies, "the only thing in painting that excites me to the depths of my soul, and which makes me feel the infinite more than anything else." Van Gogh wrote further of the meaning he wished to evoke: "in a picture I want to say something comforting as music is comforting. I want to paint men and women with that something of the eternal which the halo used to symbolize, and which we seek to communicate by the actual radiance and vibration of our colouring."

As much as Van Gogh liked to paint portraits of people, there were few opportunities for him to pay or arrange for models for his work. He found a bounty in the work of the Roulin family, for which he made several images of each person. In exchange, Van Gogh gave the Roulins one painting for each family member.

As the Roulin family was similar in size to Van Gogh's own, in his psychological approach Lubin suggested that Van Gogh may have adopted them as a substitute.

Van Gogh painted the family of postman Joseph Roulin in the winter of 1888, every member more than once. The family included Joseph Roulin, the postman; his wife, Augustine; and their three children. Van Gogh described the family as "really French, even if they look like Russians." Over the course of just a few weeks, he painted Augustine and the children several times. The reason for multiple works was partly so that the Roulins could have a painting of each family member, so that with these pictures and others, their bedroom became a virtual "museum of modern art." The family's consent to modeling for van Gogh also gave him the opportunity to create more portraits, which was both meaningful and inspirational to van Gogh.

Van Gogh used color for dramatic effect. Each family member's clothes are done in bold primary colours and van Gogh used contrasting colours in the background to intensify the impact of the work.

=== Joseph ===
Joseph Roulin was born on 4 April 1841 in Lambesc. His wife, née Augustine-Alix Pellicot, was also from Lambesc; they married on 31 August 1868. Joseph, 47 years of age at the time of these paintings, was ten years his wife's senior. Theirs was a working class household. Joseph worked at the railroad station as an entreposeur des postes. Van Gogh compared Roulin to Socrates on many occasions; while Roulin was not the most attractive man, van Gogh found him to be "such a good soul and so wise and so full of feeling and so trustful." Strictly by appearance, Roulin reminded van Gogh of Russian novelist Fyodor Dostoyevsky – the same broad forehead, broad nose, and shape of the beard. Roulin saw van Gogh through the good and the most difficult times, corresponding with his brother, Theo following his rift with Gauguin and being at his side during and following the hospital stay in Arles.

Joseph was a "fervent republican and socialist" according to Van Gogh and he noticed how Joseph looked "like something out of Delacroix, out of Daumier" while singing La Marseillaise. He described Joseph's voice as "a distant echo of the clarion of revolutionary France".

Joseph first posed for Van Gogh on the day his daughter Marcelle was born. The willow armchair that he sat in for the first painting is now in the collection of the Van Gogh Museum.

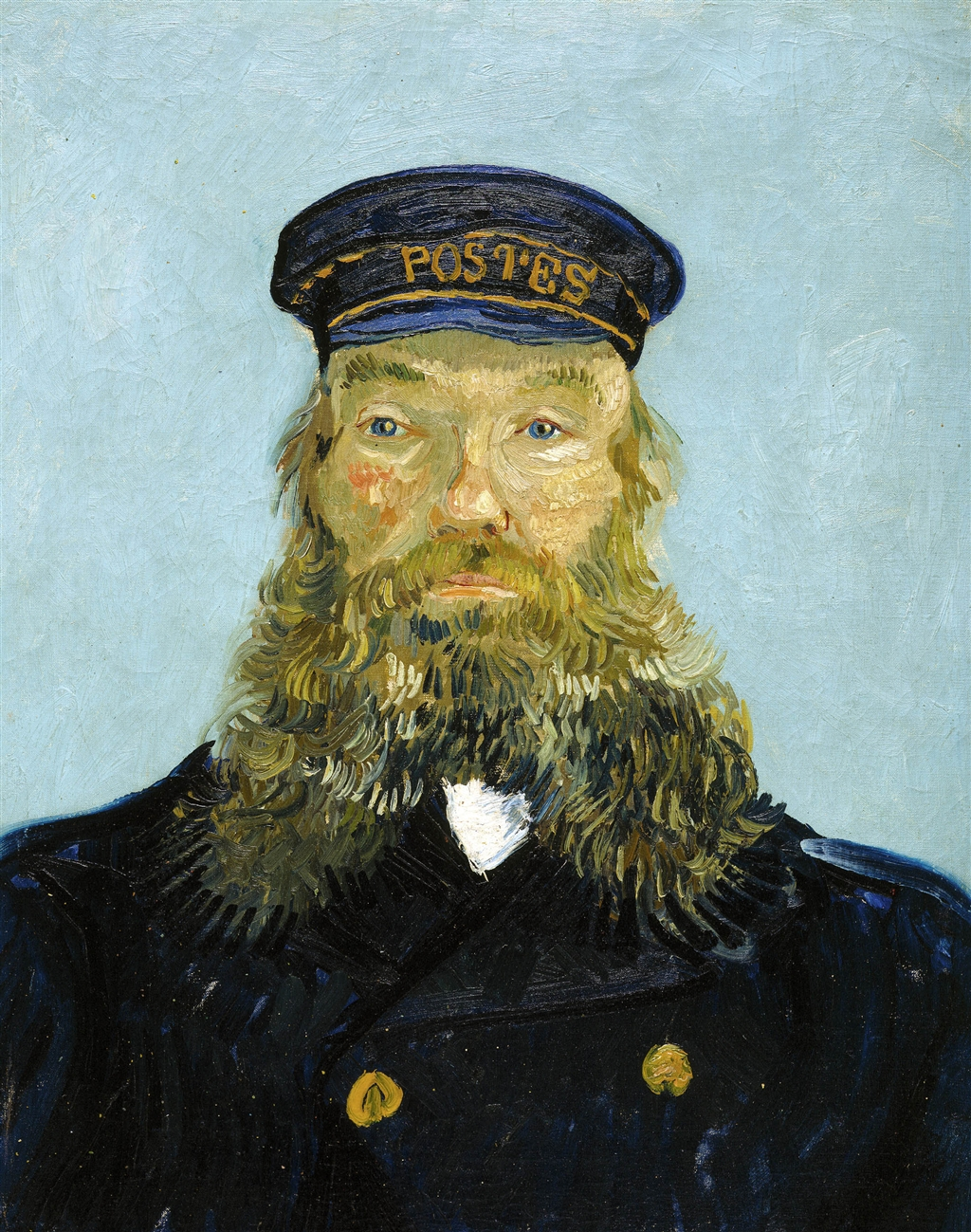
Portrait of the Postman Joseph Roulin, second version, early August, 1888, Detroit Institute of Arts (F433)

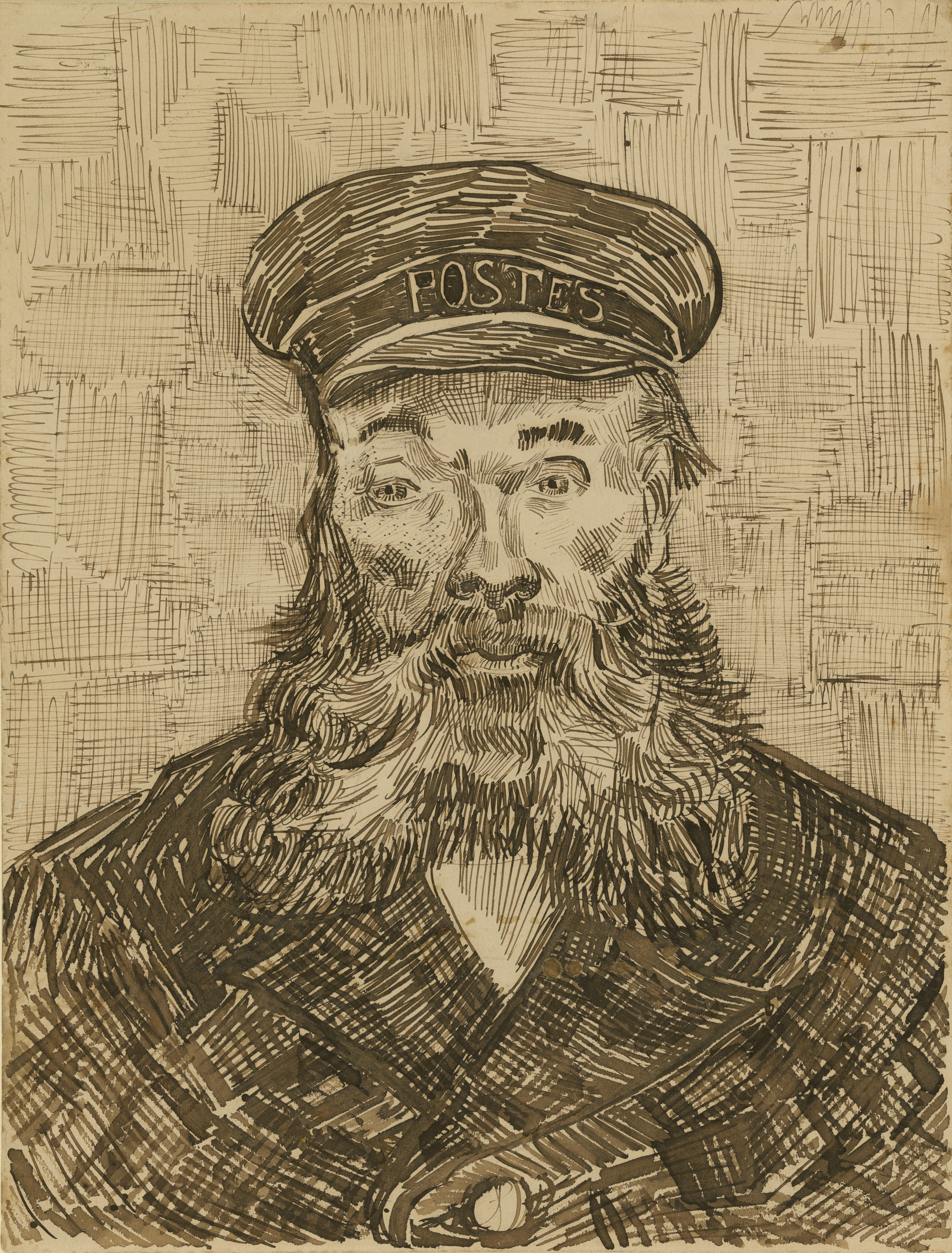
Drawing after the second version, Getty Museum

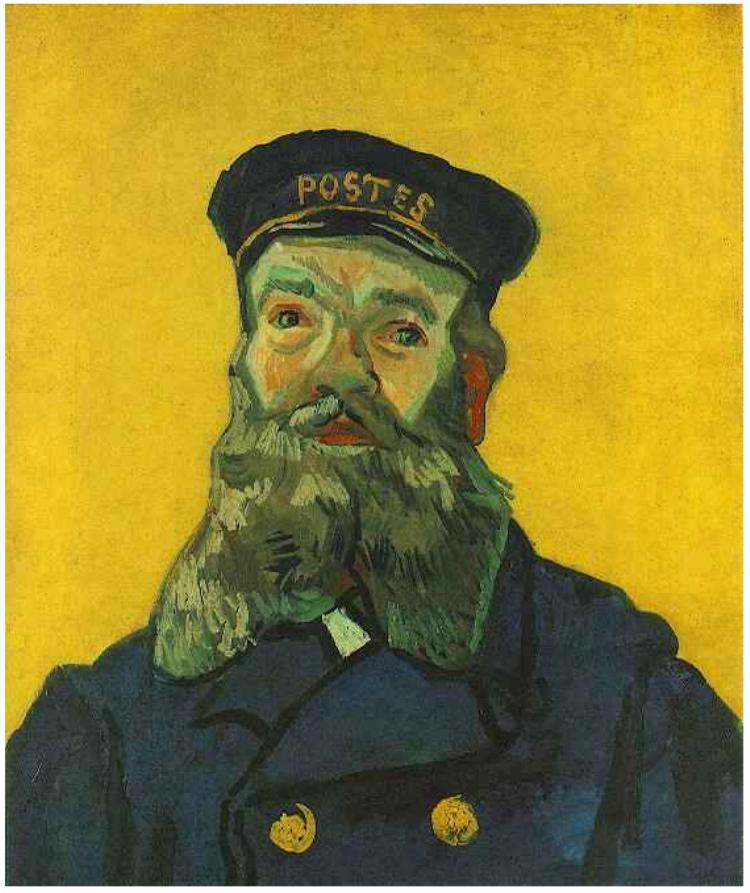
The Father or Portrait of the Postman Joseph Roulin, Nov–Dec 1888, Kunstmuseum Winterthur, Switzerland (F434)

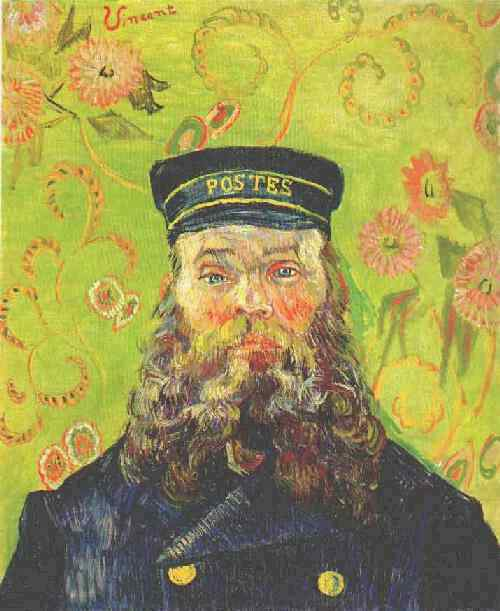
Portrait of the Postman Joseph Roulin, April 1889, Barnes Foundation, Philadelphia (F435)

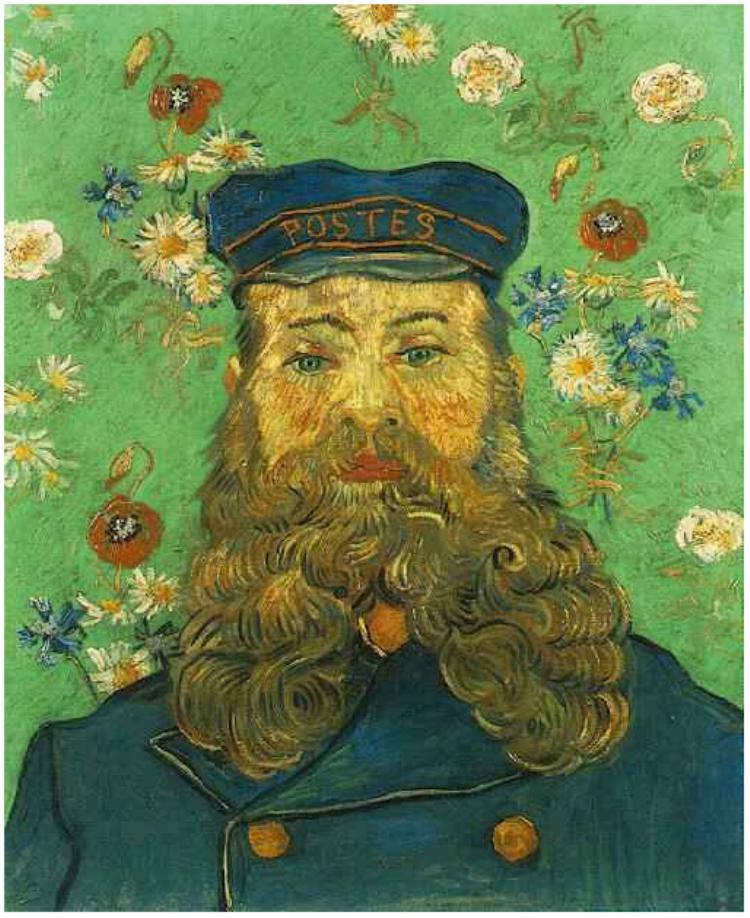
Portrait of the Postman Joseph Roulin, April 1889, Kröller-Müller Museum, Otterlo, Netherlands (F439)

In the very first days of December 1888 Vincent told his brother Theo:

I have made portraits of a whole family, that of the postman whose head I had done previously – the man, his wife, the baby, the young boy, and the son of sixteen, all of them real characters and very French, though they look like Russians. Size 15 canvases. You know how I feel about this, how I feel in my element, and that it consoles me up to a certain point for not being a doctor. I hope to get on with this and to be able to get more careful posing, paid for by portraits. And if I manage to do this whole family better still, at least I shall have done something to my liking and something individual. Just now I am completely swamped with studies, studies, studies, and this will go on for quite a while – it makes such a mess that it breaks my heart, and yet it will provide me with some property when I'm forty.

The size given (Toile de 15, c. 65 × 54 cm), the complete set can be identified:

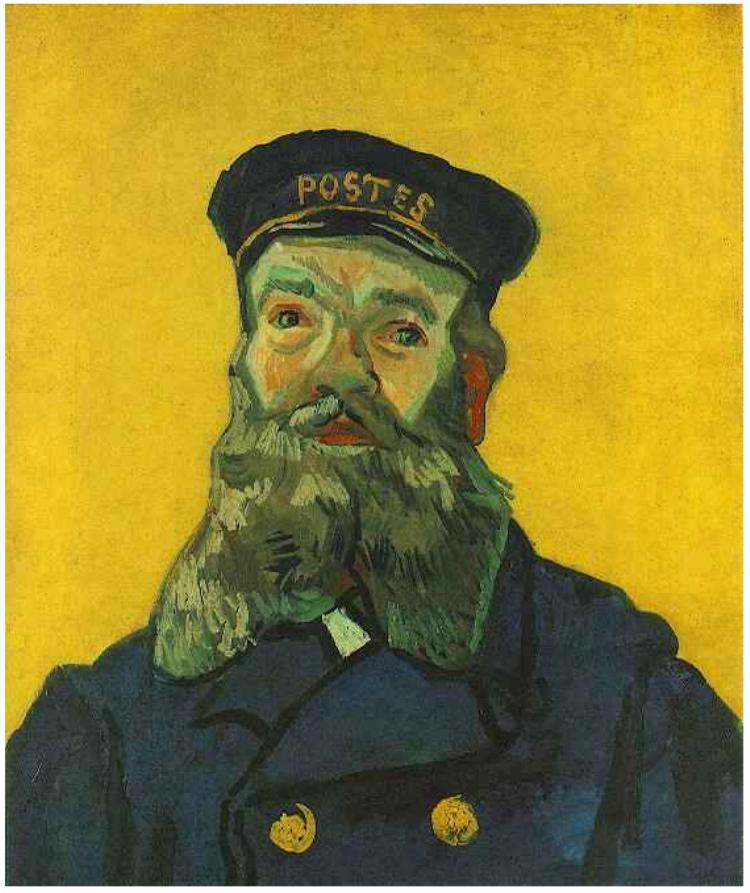
Joseph

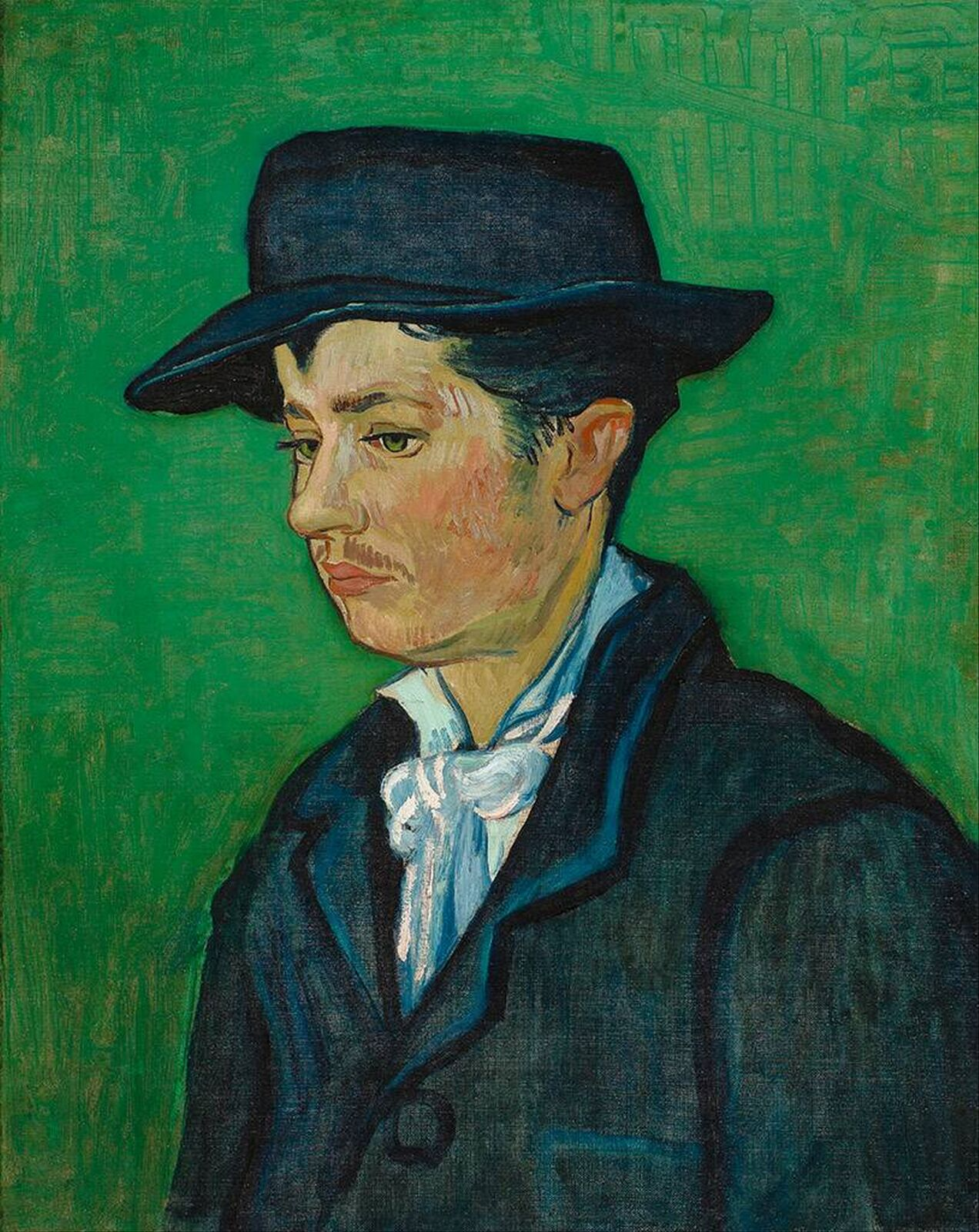
Armand

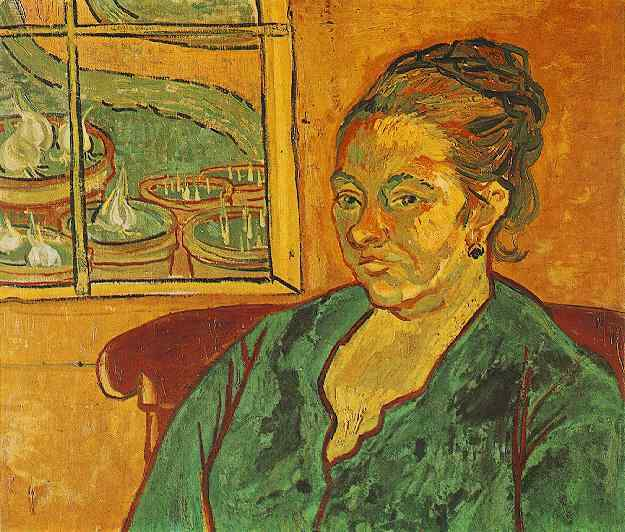
Augustine

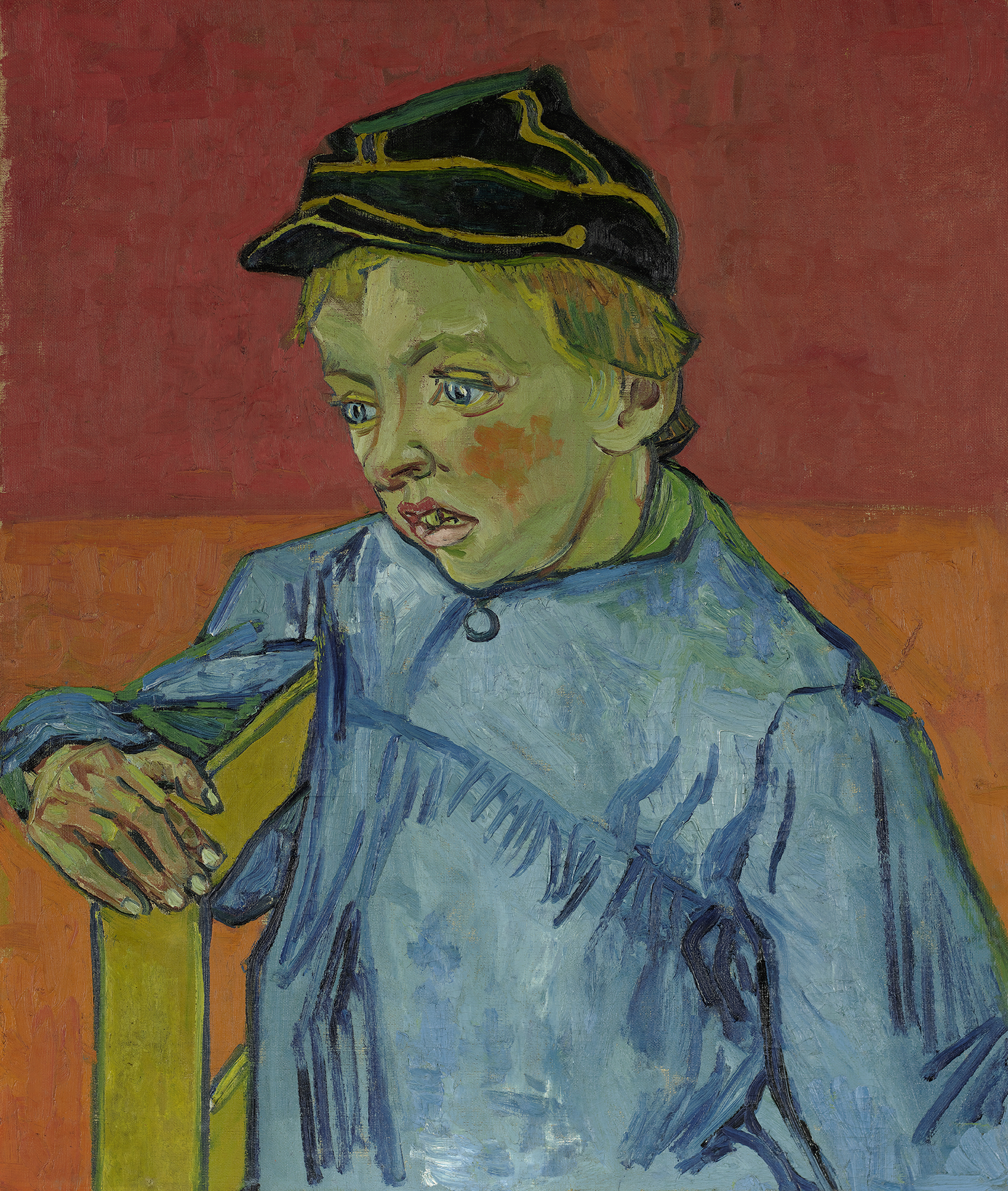
Camille

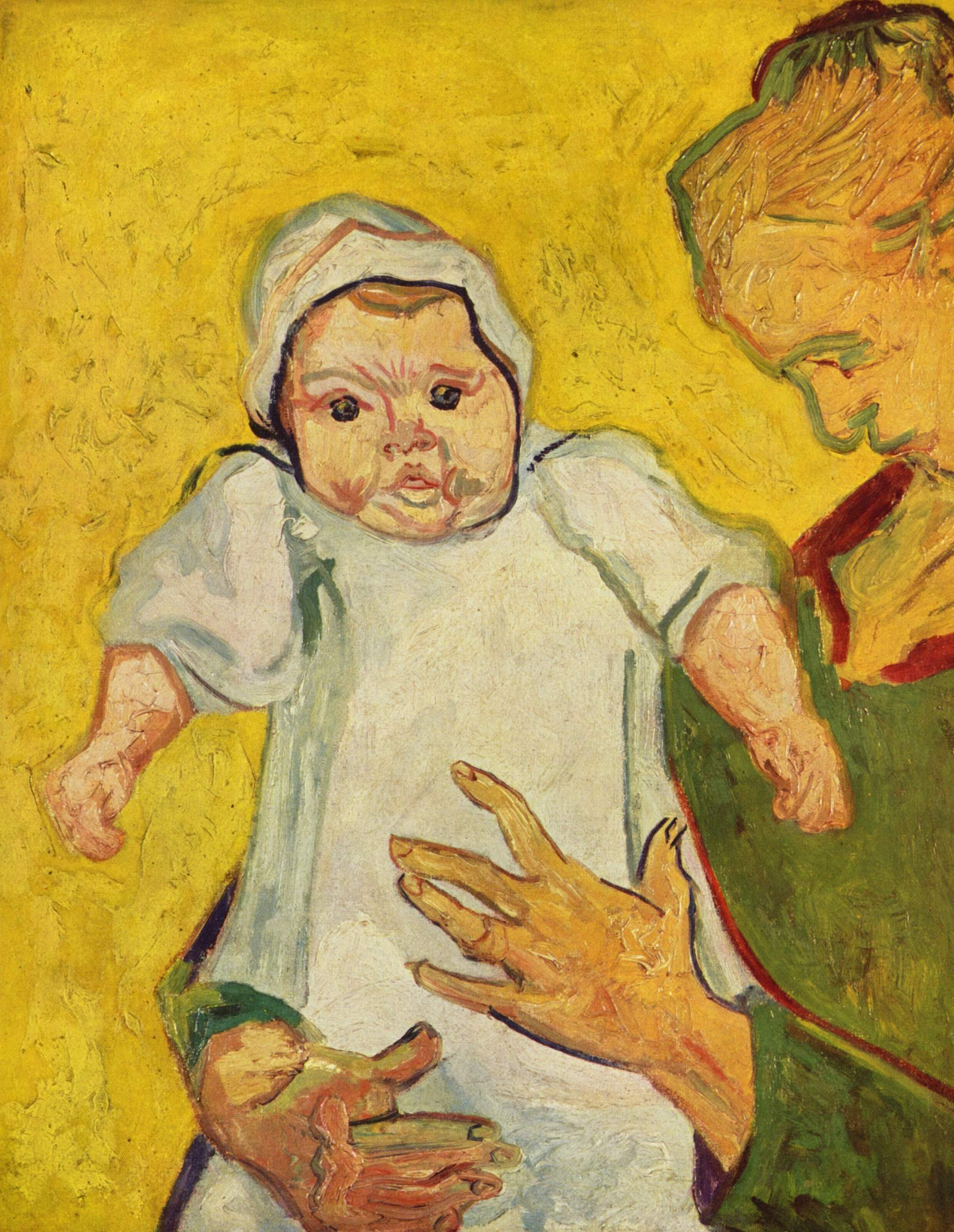
Marcelle

=== Augustine ===
Augustine Roulin (née Augustine-Alix Pellicot) was born on 9 October 1851 in Lambesc and died on 5 April 1930.

After her husband had posed for several works with van Gogh, Augustine sat for Van Gogh and Paul Gauguin in the Yellow House the two men shared. During the sitting, she kept her gaze on Gauguin, possibly for reassurance because, according to her daughter, she was not comfortable in the presence of van Gogh. She sat in the corner of the room for the evening sitting. The resulting paintings were quite different, as was typical of the sessions where the artists shared the same model. Gauguin's portrait included as background a picture he recently completed entitled Blue Trees. He painted Augustine in a straightforward, literal way.

In comparison, Van Gogh's work appeared more quickly executed and more thickly painted than that of Gauguin's painting. Van Gogh admired the work of Dutch master Frans Hals whose portraits display lively brushwork and the direct, spontaneous style of alla prima, or wet-on-wet. The yellow brushstrokes on the side of her head depict the gaslight. Instead of depicting the evening mood, he painted pots of sprouting bulbs. Van Gogh made a connection to her earthy nature by the depiction of germinating bulbs, essentially declaring her a "human tuber." Days after working on this painting Van Gogh began painting the remaining Roulin family members, including the four-month-old baby, Marcelle.

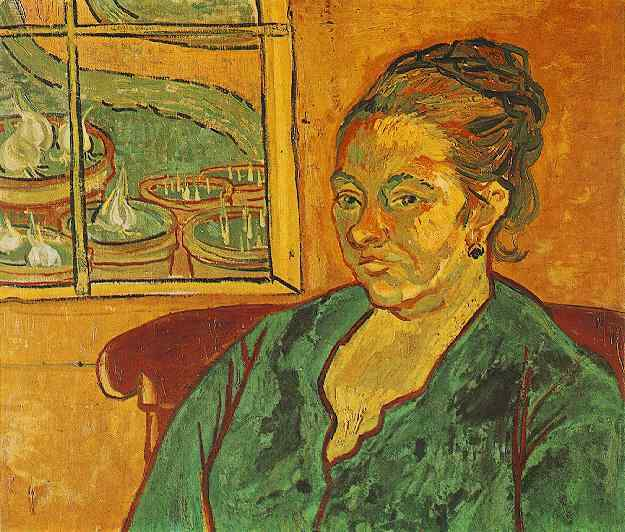
The Mother or Portrait of Madame Augustine Roulin, Nov–Dec 1888, Oskar Reinhart Collection "Am Römerholz", Winterthur (F503)

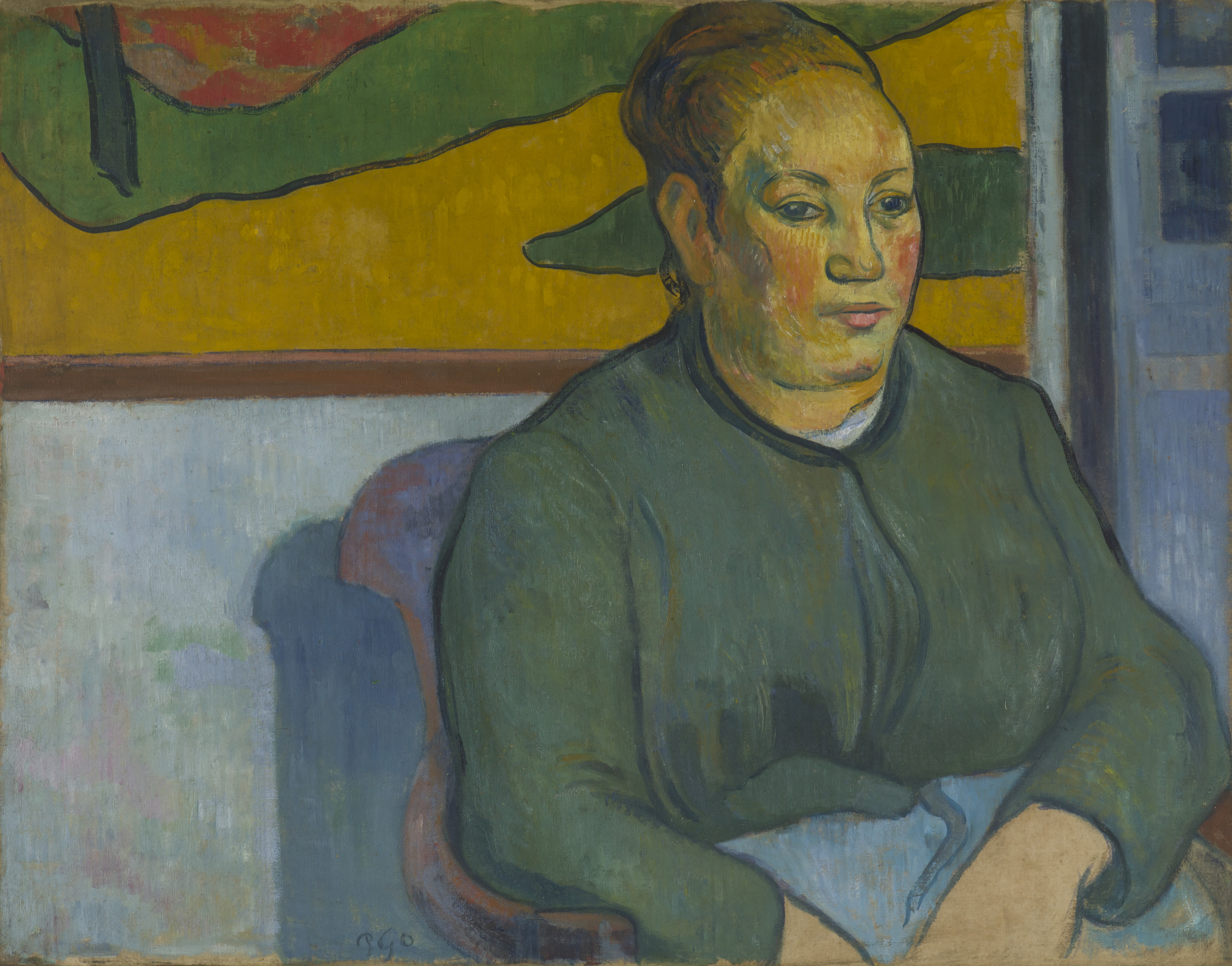
Portrait of Madame Roulin, by Paul Gauguin.

In addition to the mother-daughter works where Marcelle is visible, Van Gogh also created several La Berceuse [la bɛʁsøz] works where Augustine rocked her unseen cradle by a string. Van Gogh labeled the group of work La Berceuse meaning "our lullaby or the woman rocking the cradle." The colour and setting were intended to set the scene of a lullaby, meant to give comfort to "lonely souls." Van Gogh imagined the painting in several types of settings, such as on an Icelandic fishing boat cabin walls—or the centerpiece to two Sunflower paintings.

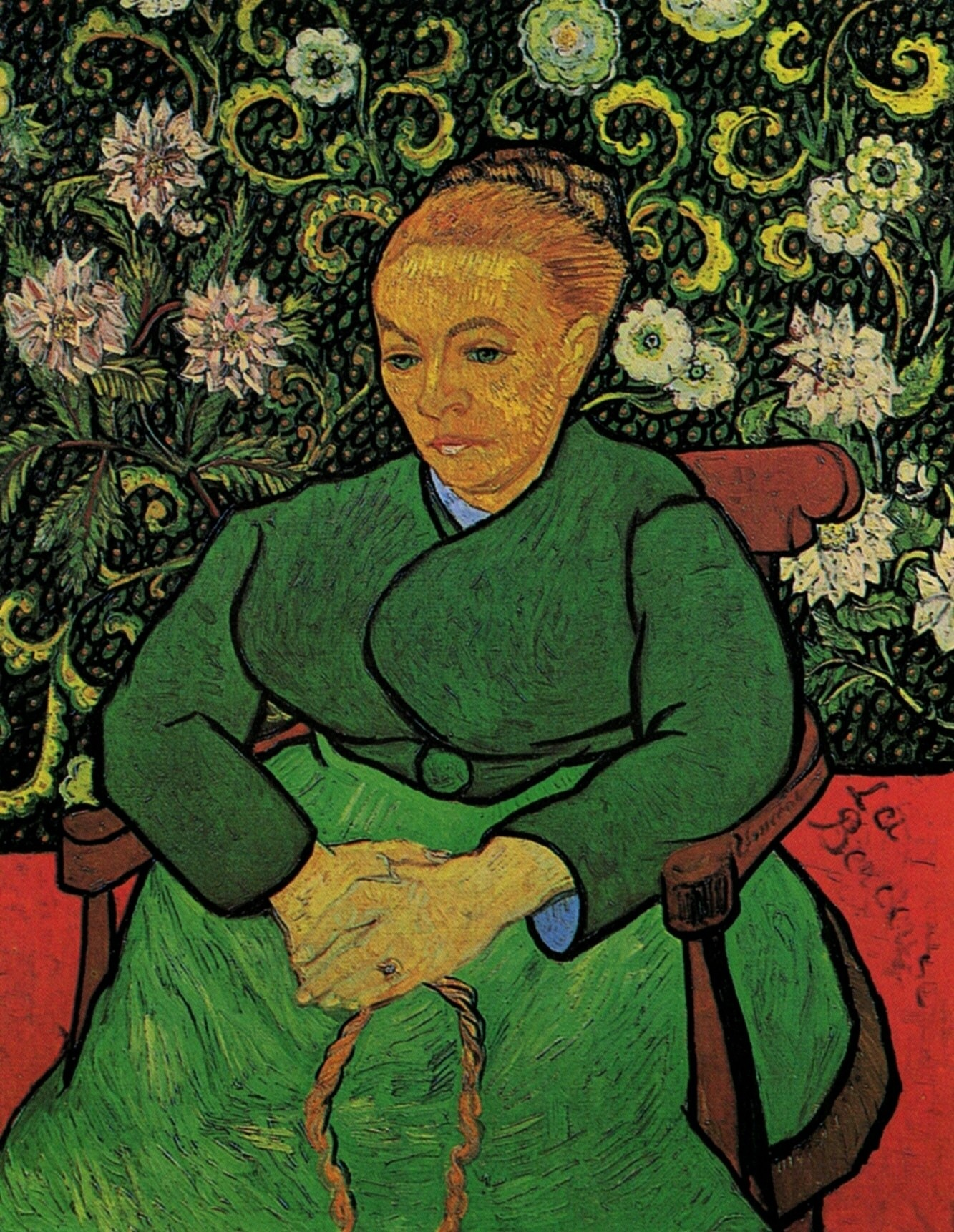
La Berceuse (Augustine Roulin), December, 1888, Kröller-Müller Museum, Otterlo, Netherlands (F504)

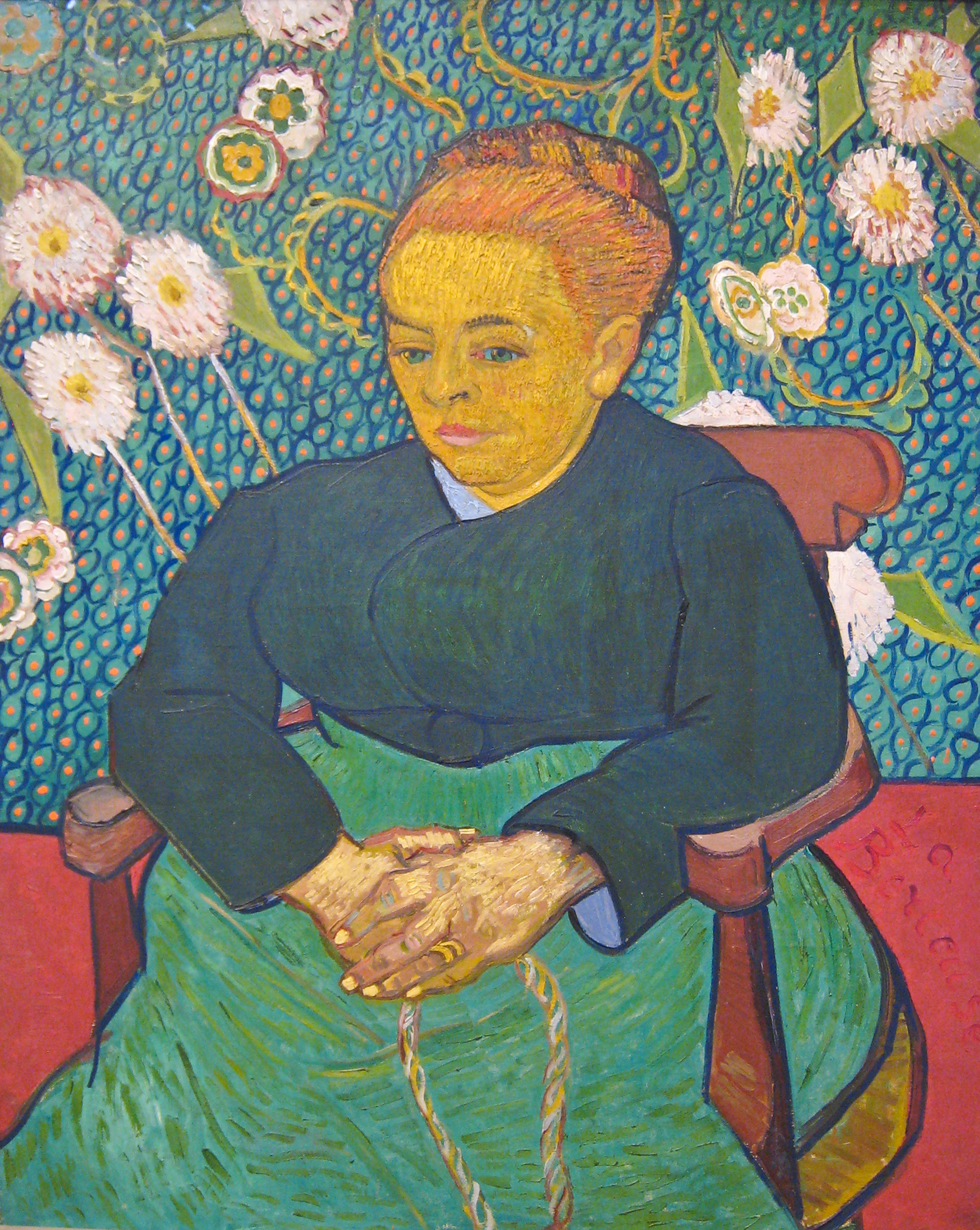
La Berceuse (Augustine Roulin), Museum of Fine Arts, Boston (F508)

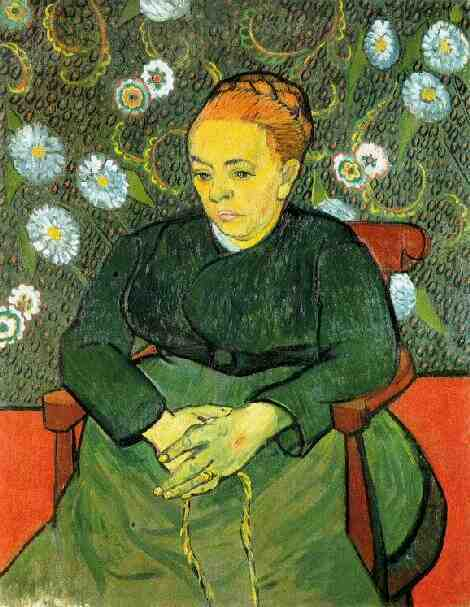
La Berceuse (Augustine Roulin), March 1889, Stedelijk Museum, Amsterdam (F507)

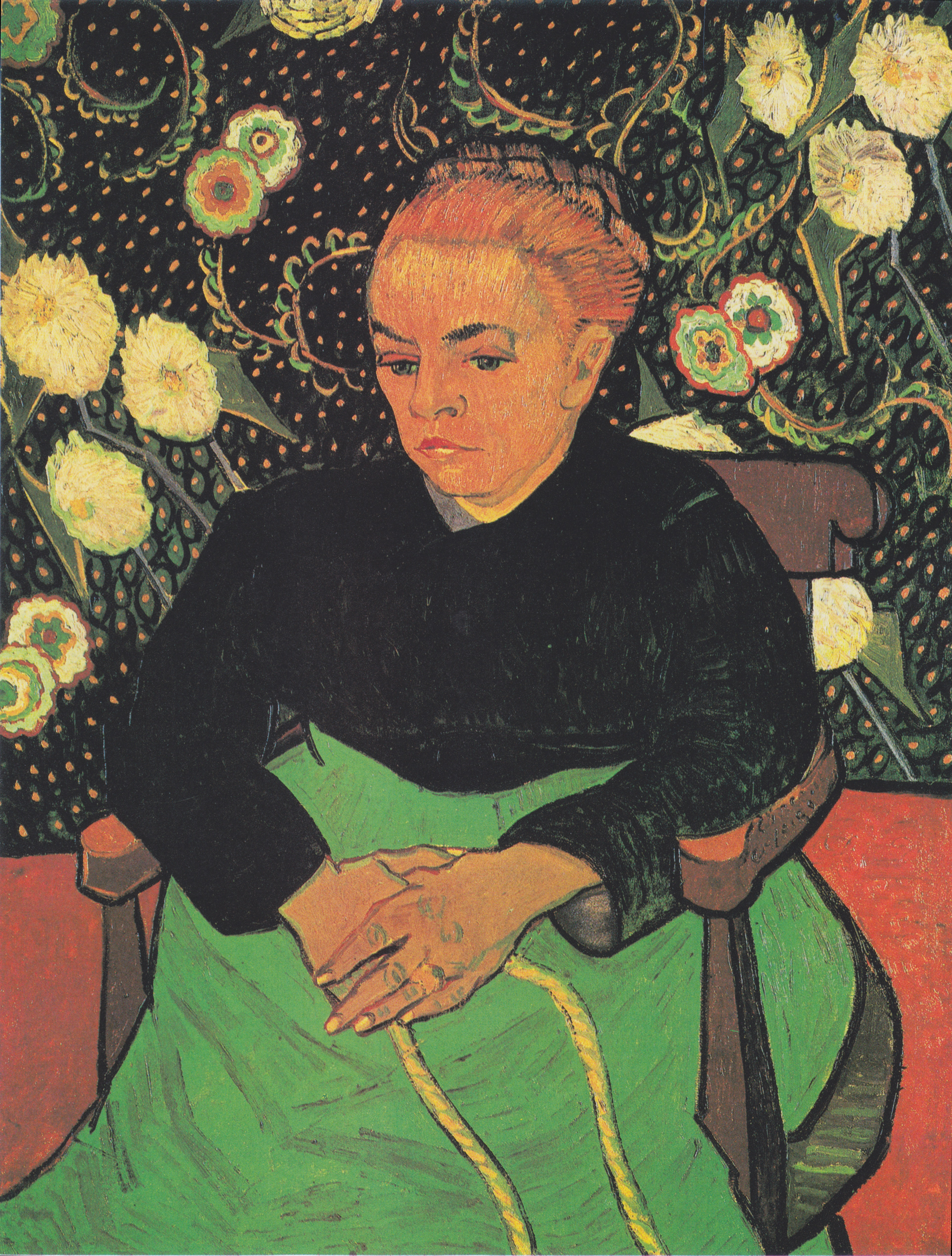
La Berceuse (Augustine Roulin), February 1889, The Art Institute of Chicago, Illinois (F506)

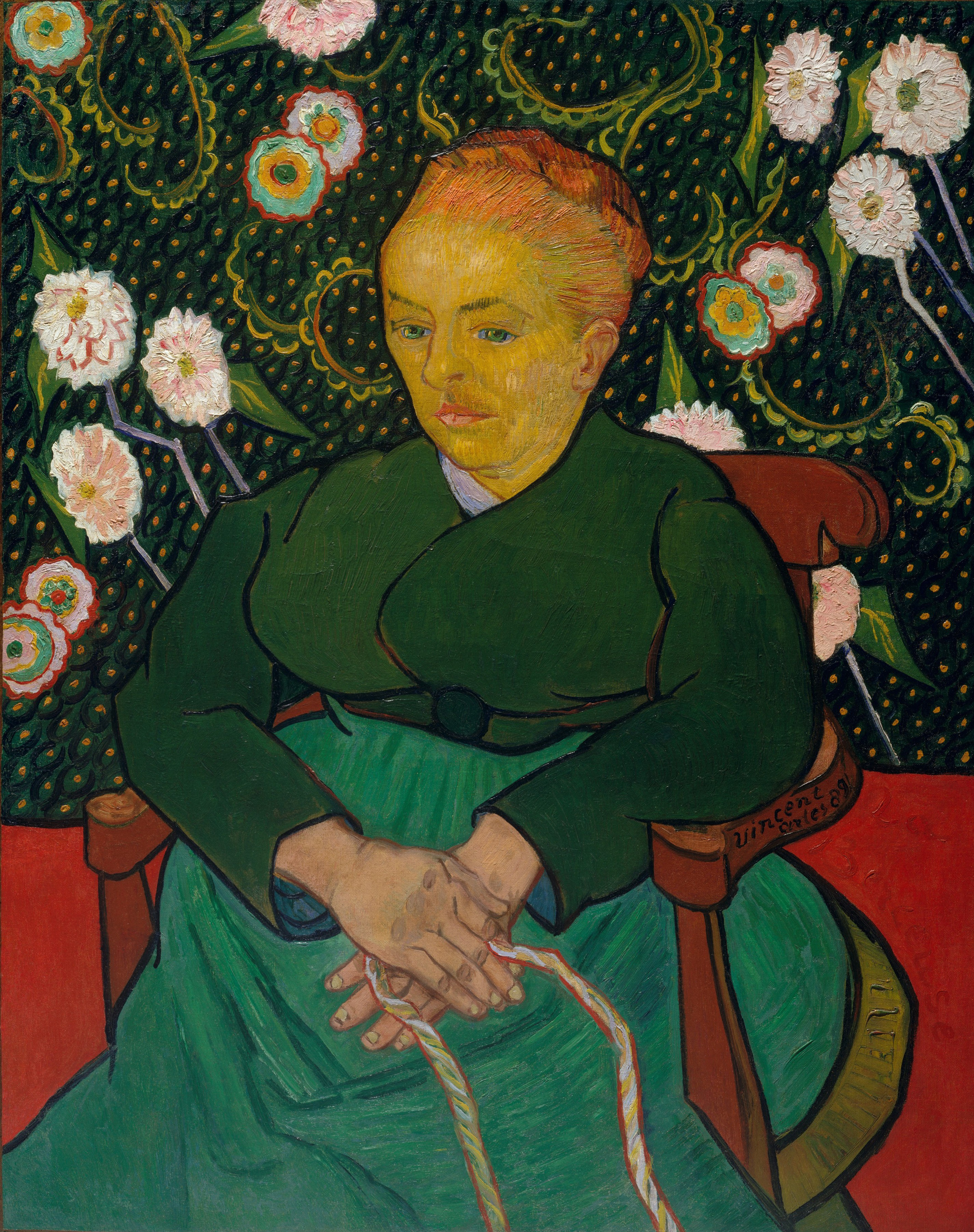
La Berceuse (Augustine Roulin), January 1889, The Metropolitan Museum of Art, New York (F505)

There is a fifth version of the painting at the Art Institute of Chicago.

=== Armand ===
Armand Roulin, the eldest son, was born on 5 May 1871 in Lambesc, and died on 14 November 1945. He was 17 years of age when portrayed by Van Gogh. Van Gogh's works depict a serious young man who at the time the paintings were made had left his parents' home, working as a blacksmith's apprentice. The Museum Folkwang work depicts Armand in what are likely his best clothes: an elegant fedora, vivid yellow coat, black waistcoat and tie. Armand's manner seems a bit sad, or perhaps bored by sitting. His figure fills the picture plane giving the impression that he is a confident, masculine young man.

The second work, with his body slightly turned aside and his eyes looking down, appears to be a sad young man. Even the angle of the hat seems to indicate sadness. Both museum paintings were made on large canvas, 65 × 54 cm.

Loving Vincent, a movie based on the life of Vincent van Gogh, features Armand Roulin as the main character. In it, Roulin is asked by his father, Joseph, to deliver a letter to Vincent's brother, Theo van Gogh. The critically acclaimed film employed oil painters trained to paint like van Gogh. Their paintings were used in each frame of the movie, using stills of van Gogh's real paintings and basing Armand Roulin's character design on another of van Gogh's paintings. Many of van Gogh's portraits, like Portrait of Armand Roulin (1888), provided designs for the movie's characters.

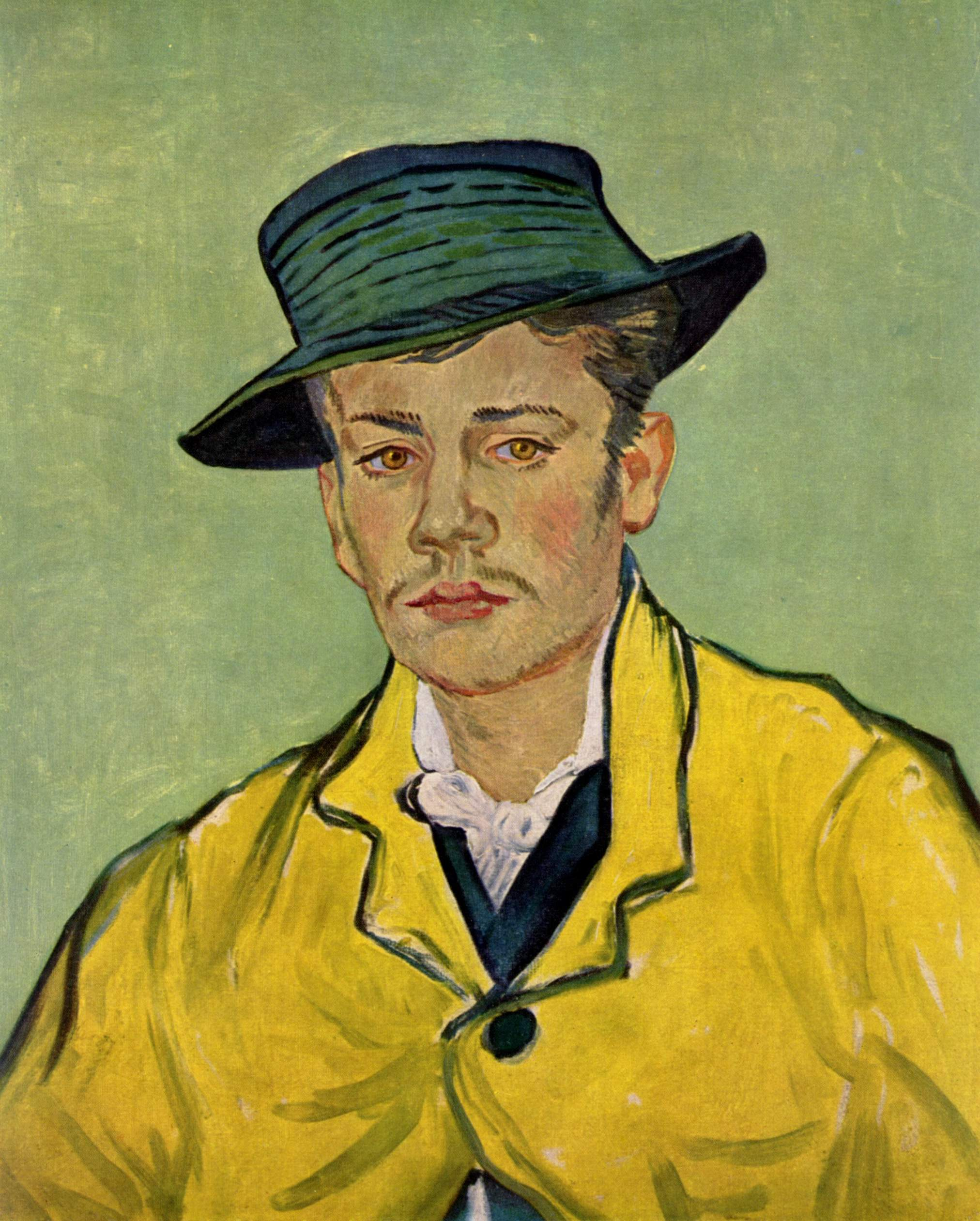
Portrait of Armand Roulin, 1888, Museum Folkwang, Essen (F492)

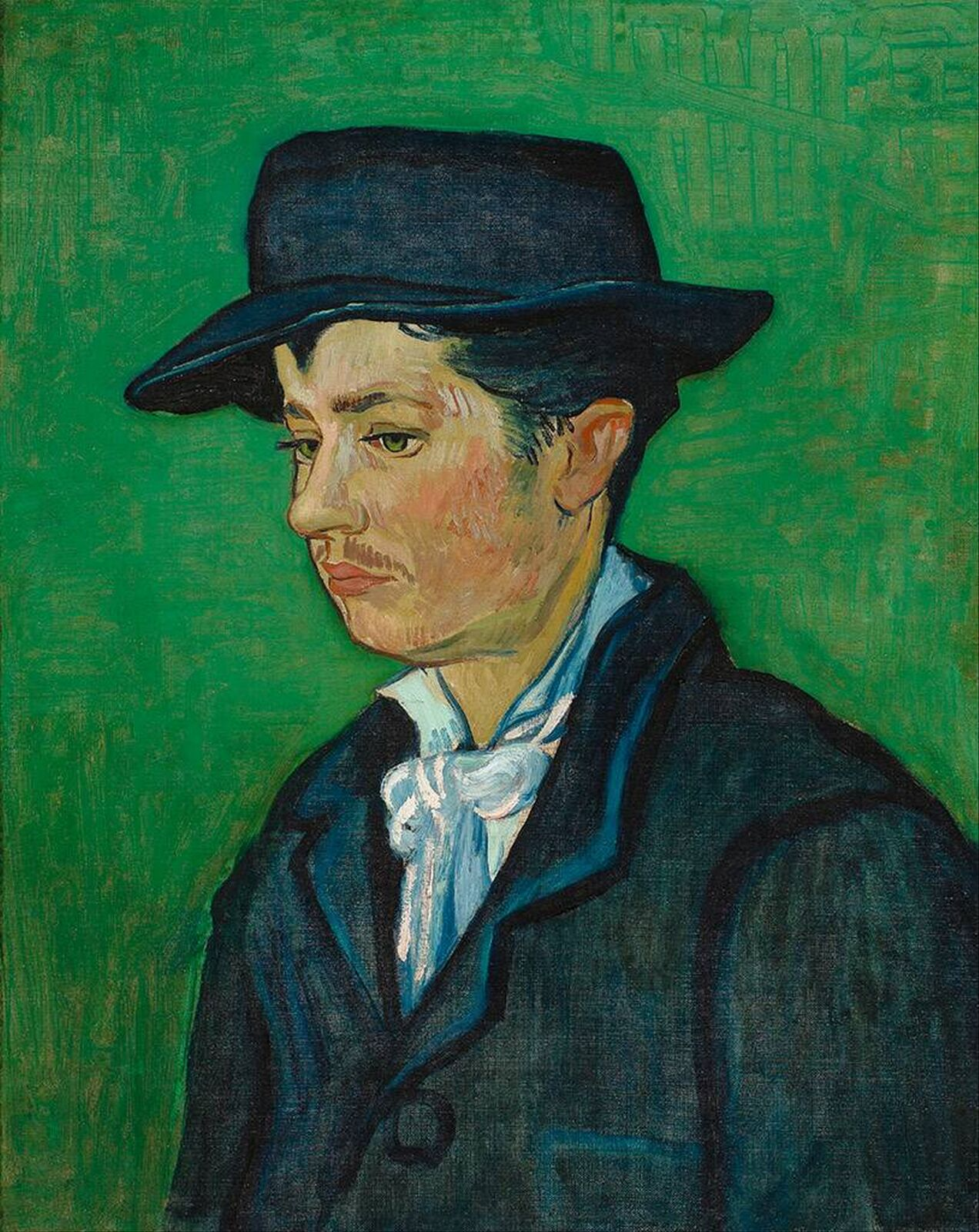
Portrait of Armand Roulin, 1888, Museum Boijmans Van Beuningen, Rotterdam (F493)

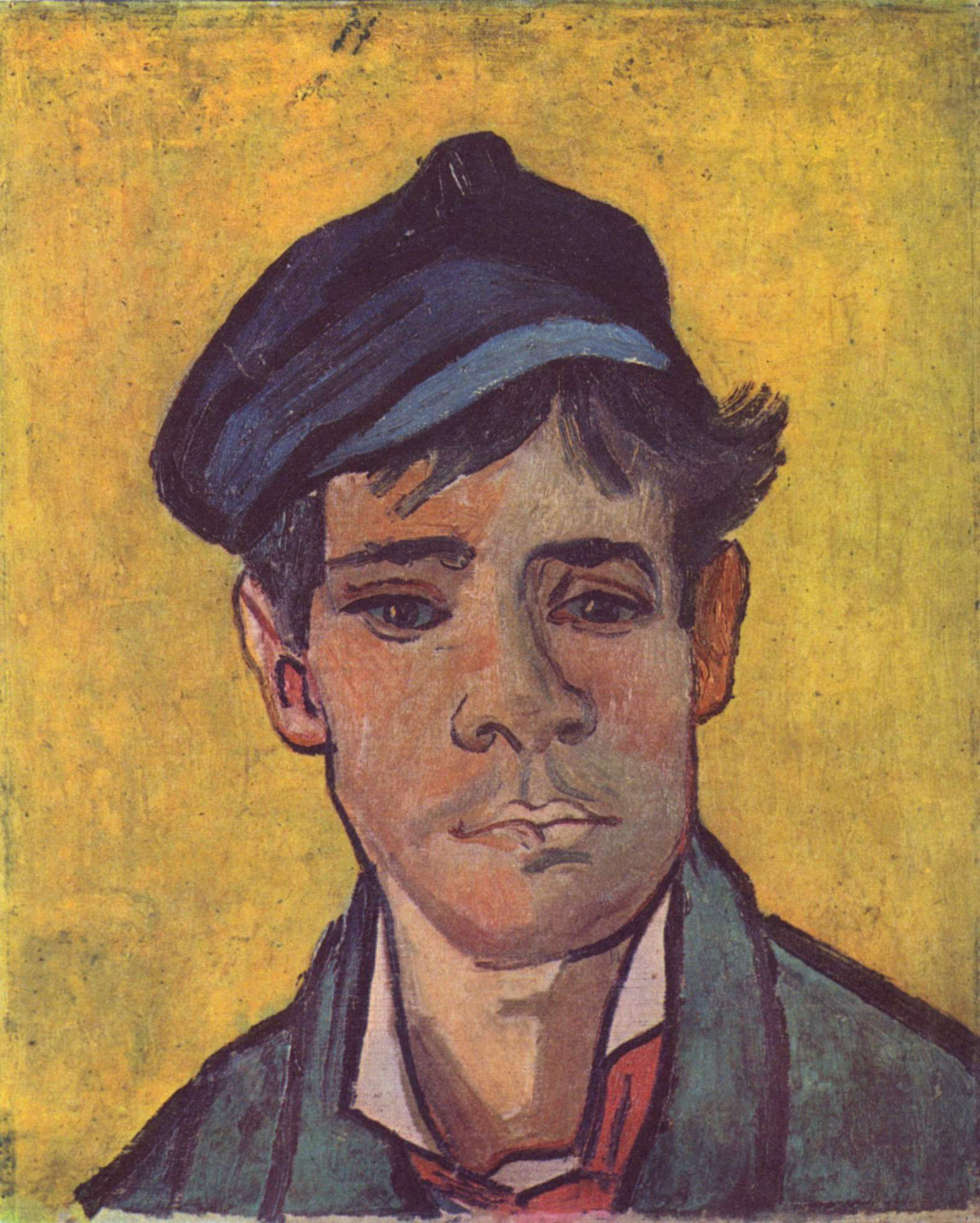
Young Man with a Cap (Armand Roulin), 1888, Private Collection, Zürich, Switzerland (F536)

=== Camille ===
Camille Roulin, the middle child, was born in Lambesc in southern France, on 10 July 1877, and died on 4 June 1922. When his portrait was painted, Camille was eleven years of age. The Van Gogh Museum painting shows Camille's head and shoulders. Yellow brush strokes behind him are evocative of the sun.

A very similar painting resides at the Philadelphia Museum of Art (F537).

In The Schoolboy with Uniform Cap Camille seems to be staring off in space. His arm is over the back of a chair, mouth gaped open, possibly lost in thought. This was the larger of the two works made of Camille.

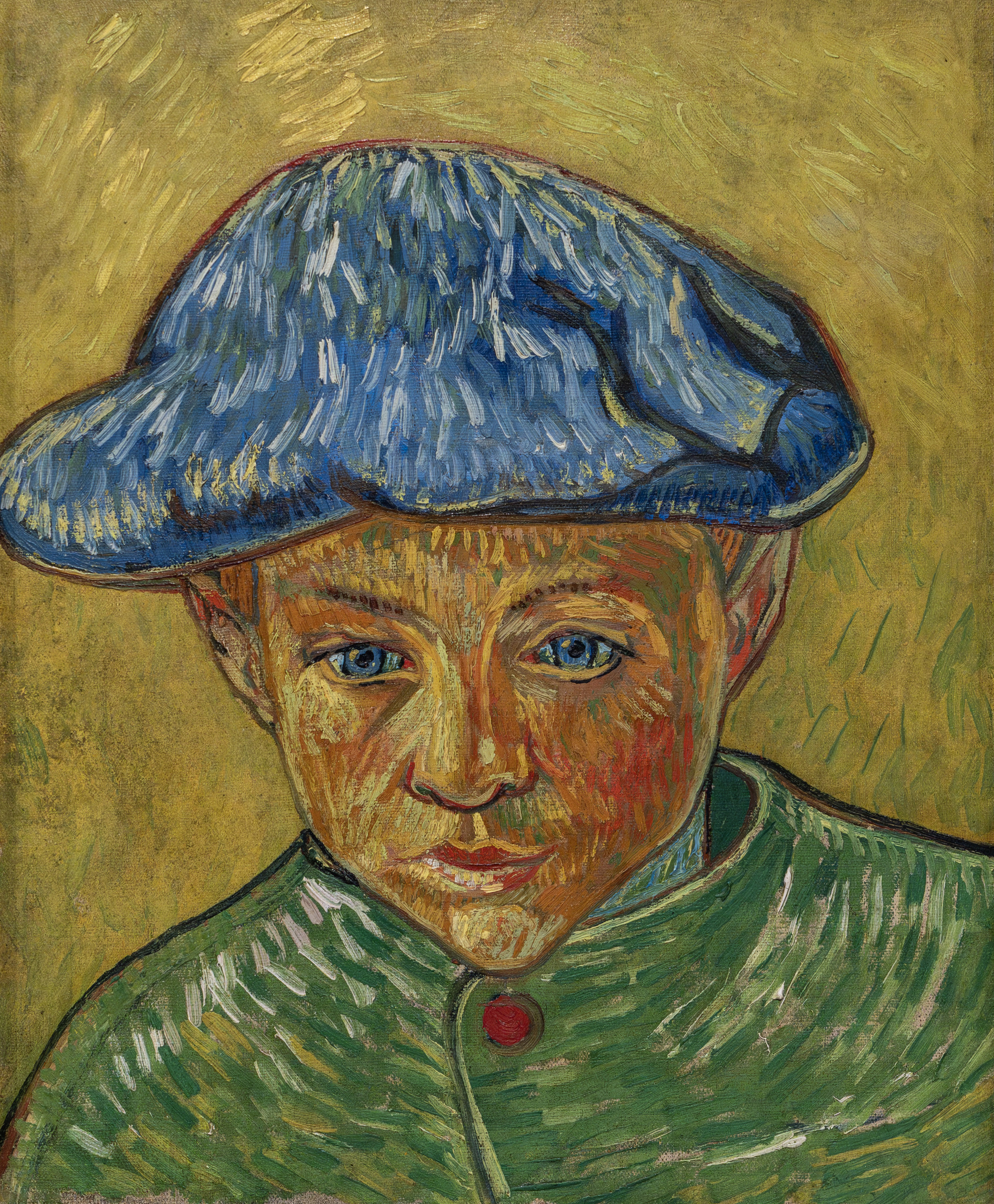
Portrait of Camille Roulin, 1888, Oil on Canvas, 40.5 × 32.5 cm, Van Gogh Museum, Amsterdam, Netherlands (F538)

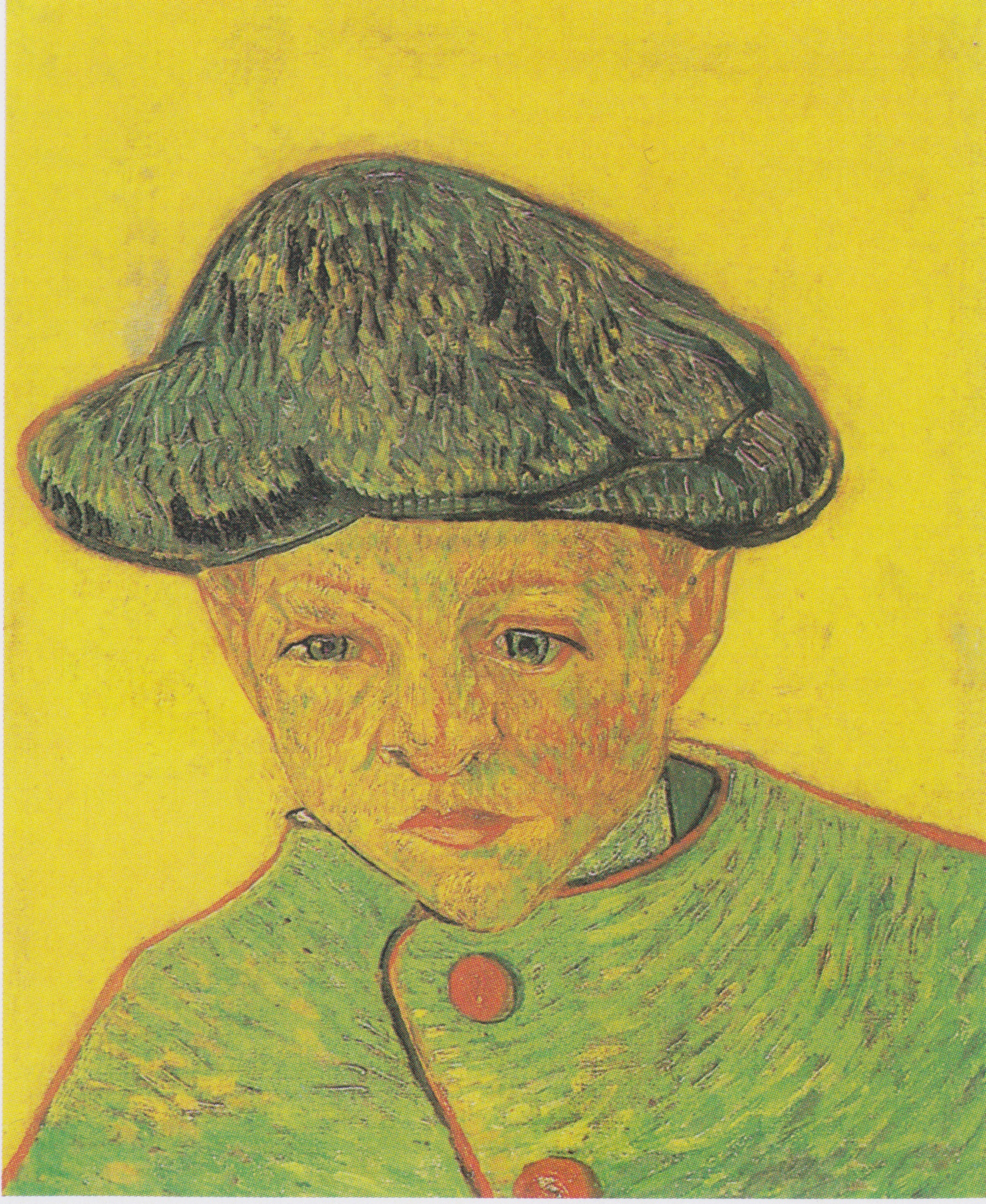
Portrait of Camille Roulin, 1888, Oil on Canvas, Philadelphia Museum of Art, Philadelphia, Pennsylvania (F537).

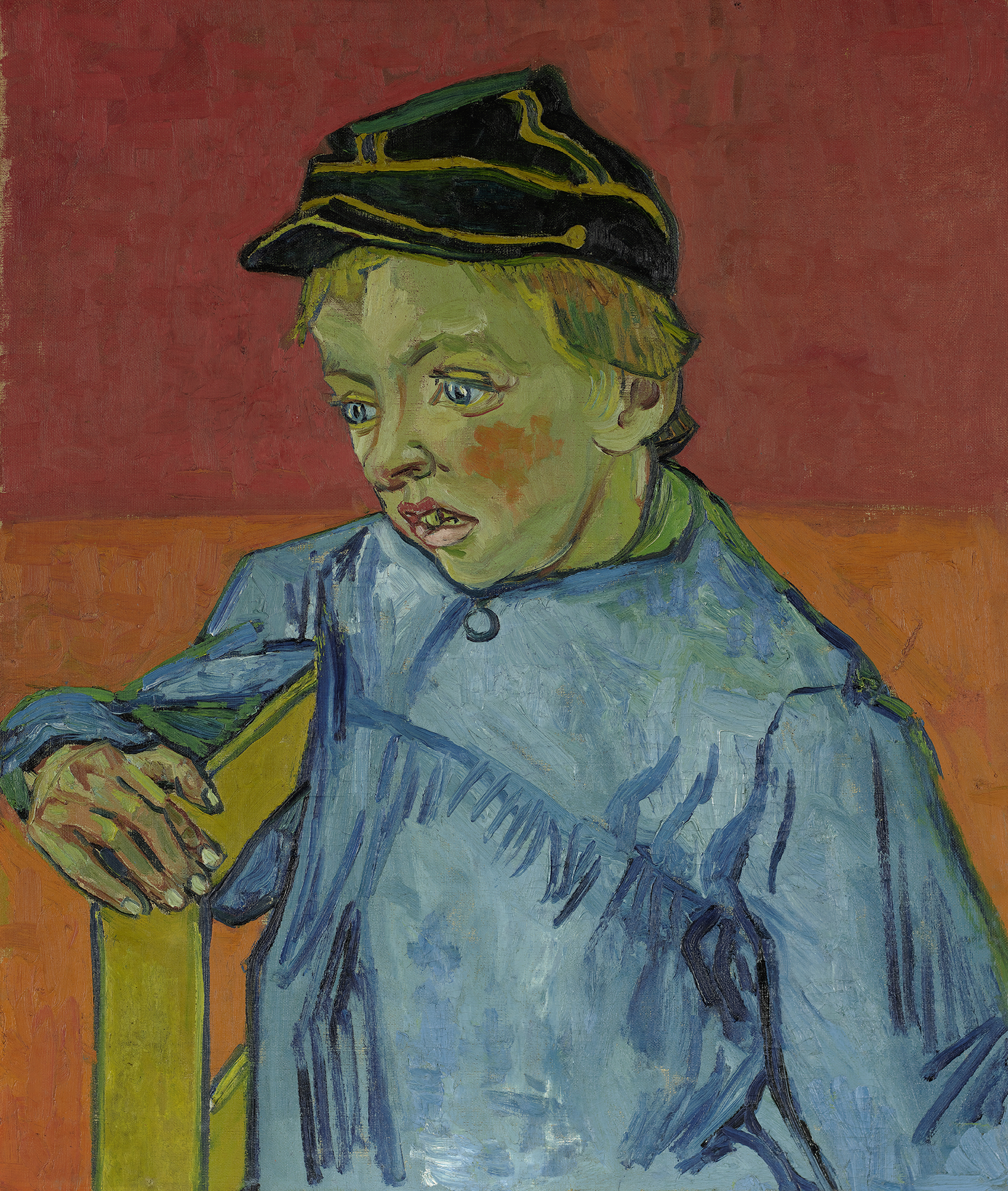
The Schoolboy with Uniform Cap (Camille Roulin), early December, 1888, São Paulo Museum of Art, São Paulo, Brazil (F665)

=== Marcelle ===
Marcelle Roulin, the youngest child (31 July 1888 – 22 February 1980) was four months old, when Van Gogh made her portraits. She was painted three times by herself and twice on her mother’s lap. The three works show the same head and shoulders image of Marcelle with her chubby cheeks and arms against a green background.

When Johanna van Gogh, pregnant at the time, saw the painting, she wrote: "I like to imagine that ours will be just as strong, just as beautiful – and that his uncle will one day paint his portrait!" A version titled Roulin's Baby resides at the National Gallery of Art in Washington, D.C.

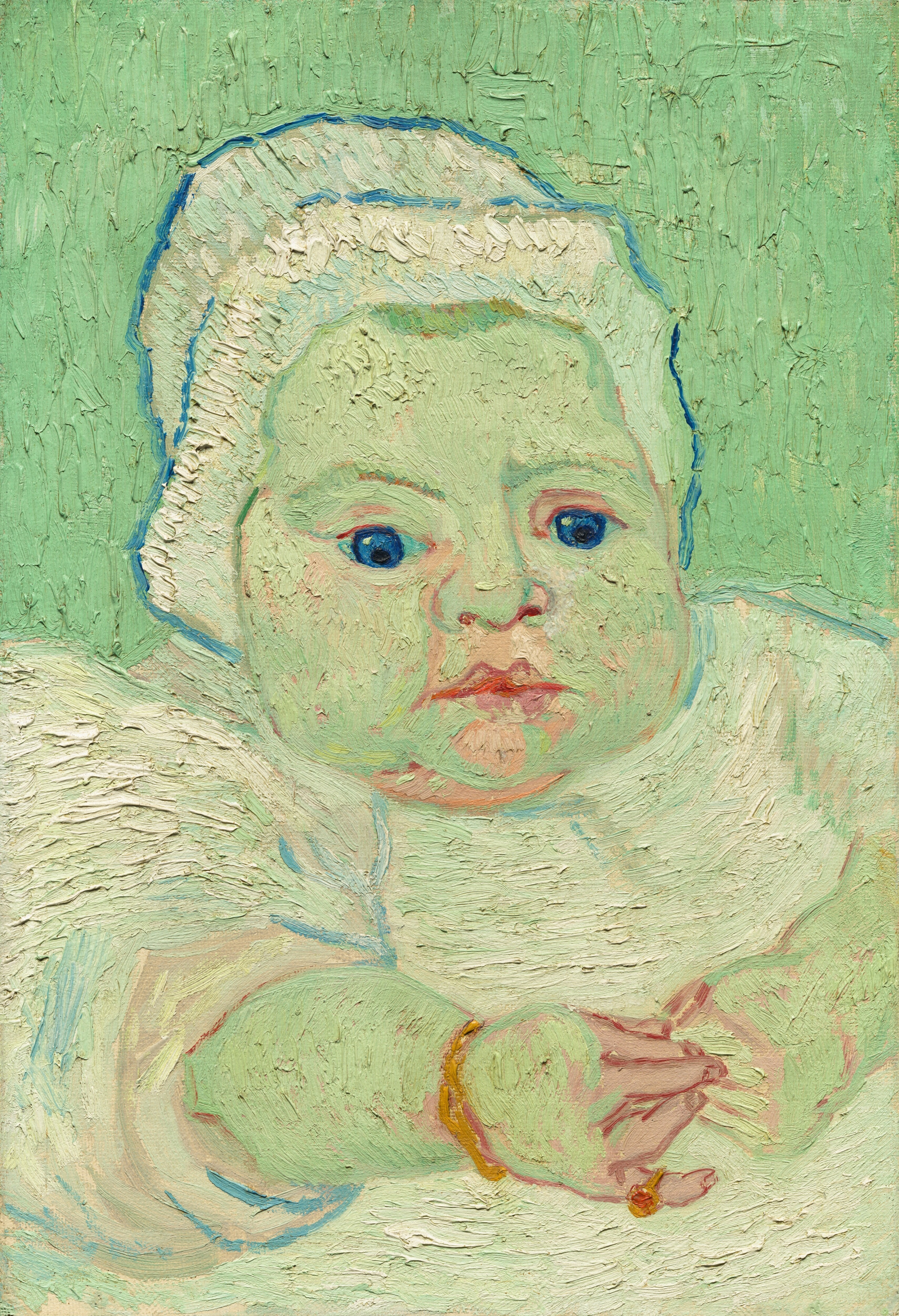
Baby Marcelle Roulin, Dec 1888, National Gallery of Art, Washington D.C., 35 x 24cm (F440)

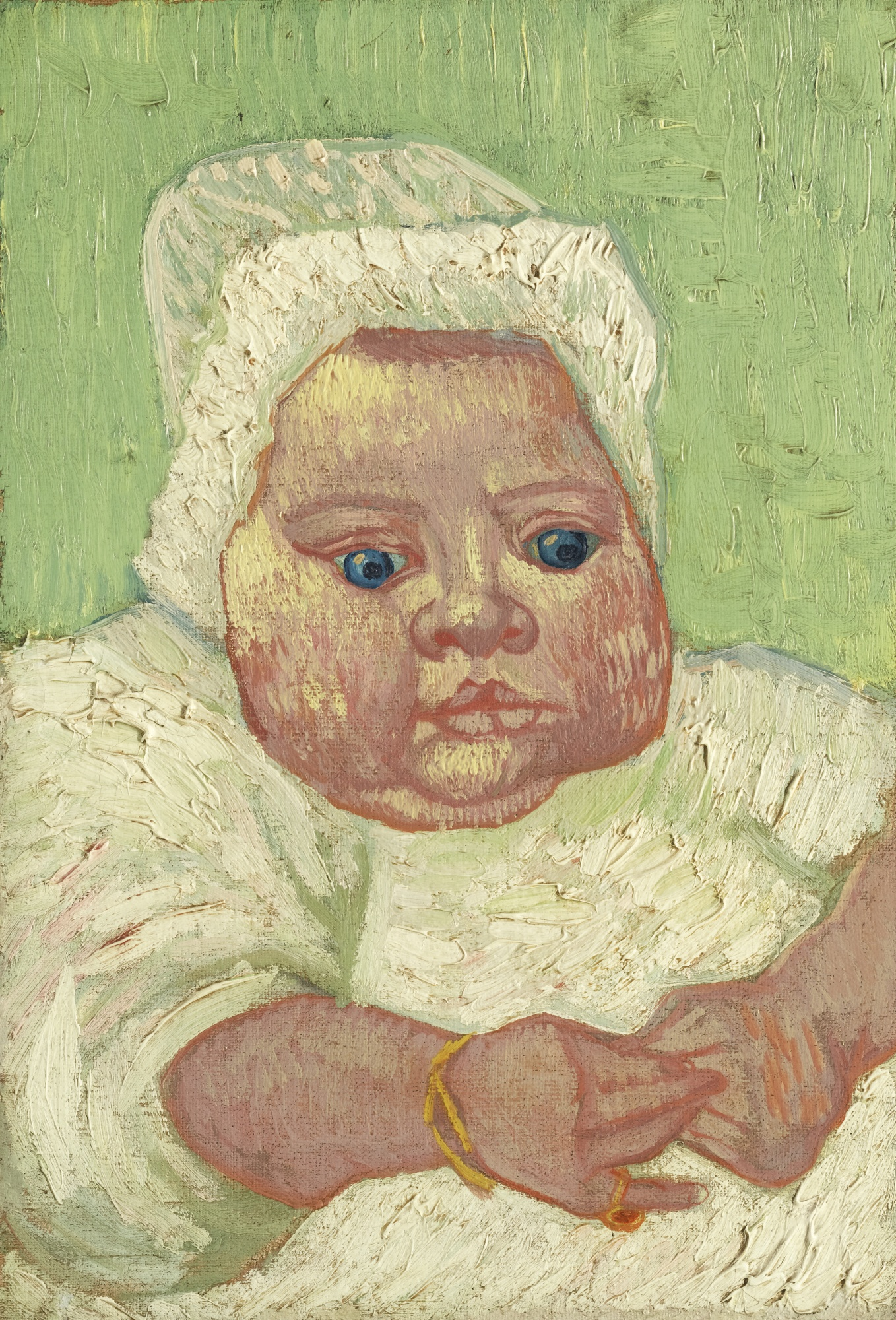
Baby Marcelle Roulin, Dec 1888, Private collection, 34.3 x 23.5cm (F441a)

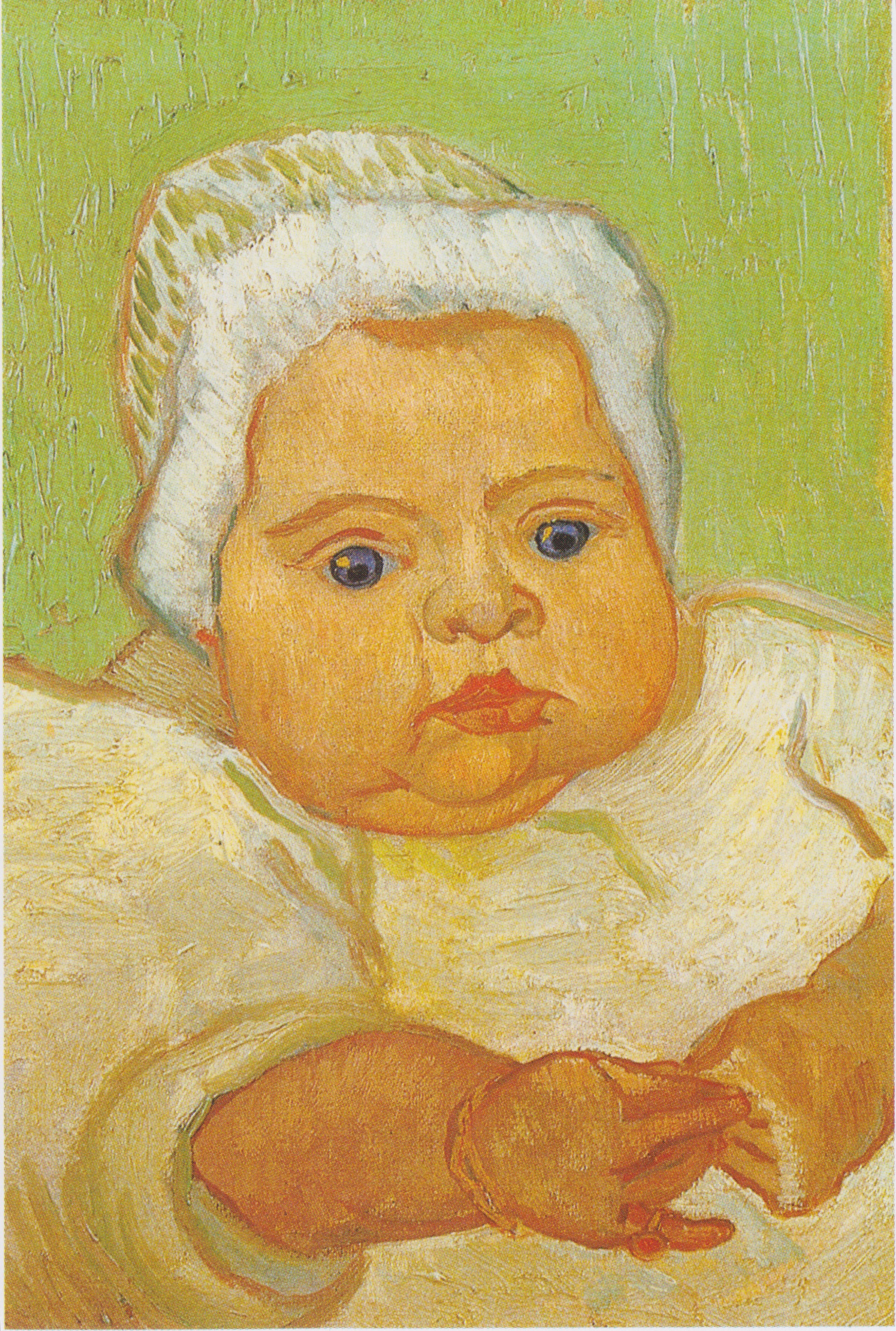
Baby Marcelle Roulin, Dec 1888, Van Gogh Museum, Amsterdam, 35 x 24.5cm, (F441)

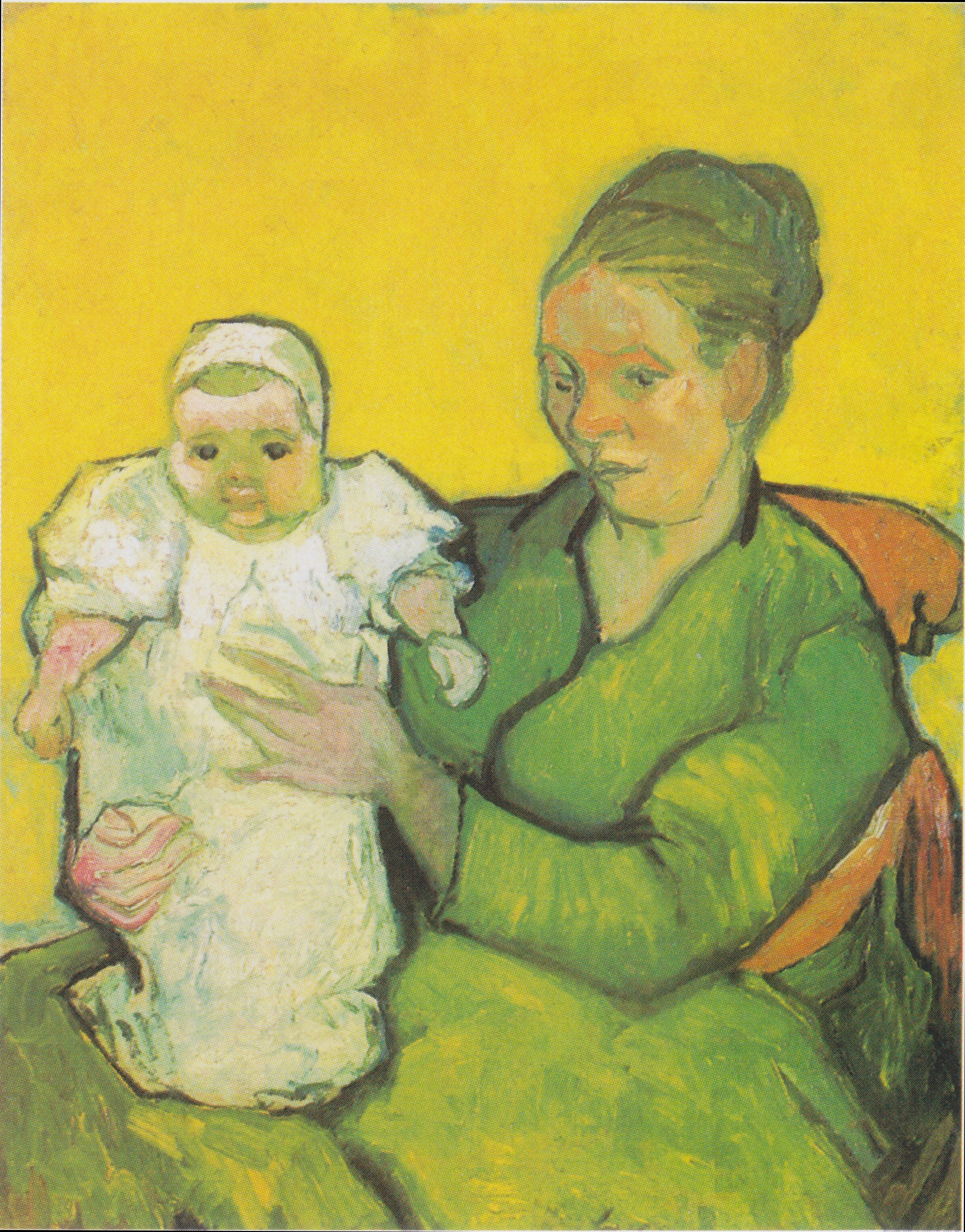
Mother Roulin with Her Baby, Nov–Dec 1888, Philadelphia Museum of Art, 92 x 73.5cm (F490)

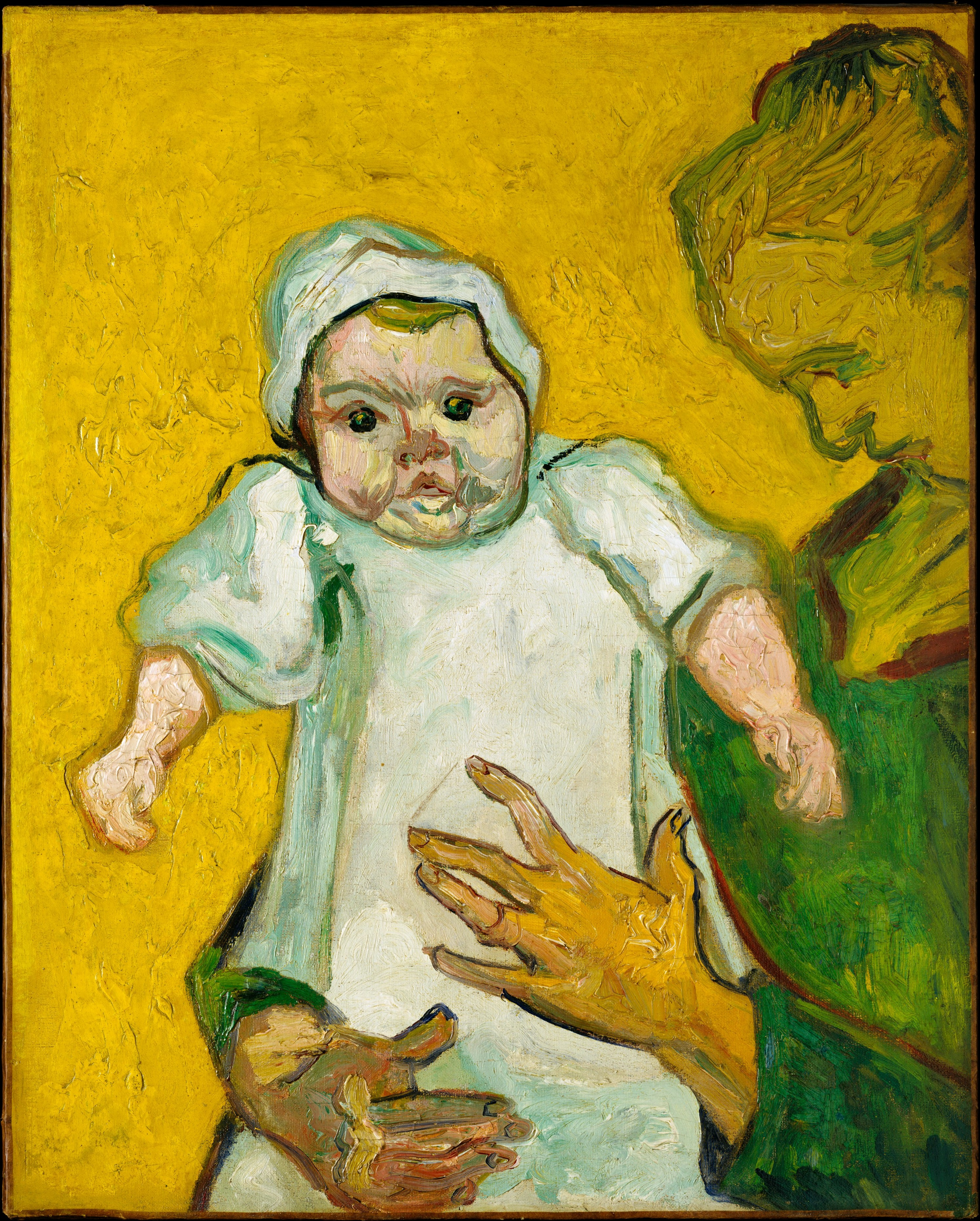
Mother Roulin with Her Baby, Nov–Dec 1888, Metropolitan Museum of Art, New York, 63.5 x 51cm, (F491)

In Philadelphia Museum of Art's Portrait of Madame Augustine Roulin and Baby Marcelle Augustine holds baby Marcelle who was born in July 1888. The mother, relaxed and her face in a shadow, is passive. We can see by the size of Augustine's sloping shoulders, arm, and hands that she worked hard to take care of her family. For instance, there were no modern conveniences like washing machines. In a traditional pose of mothers and new babies, Augustine is holding her baby upright, supporting the baby's back with her right arm and steadying the baby's midsection with her left hand. Marcelle, whose face is directed outward, is more active and engages the audience. Van Gogh used heavy outlines in blue around the images of mother and baby.

To symbolize the closeness of mother and baby, he used adjacent colours of the colour wheel, green, blue, and yellow in this work. The vibrant yellow background creates a warm glow around the mother and baby, like a very large halo. Of his use of colour, Van Gogh wrote: "instead of trying to reproduce exactly what I have before my eyes, I use colour...to express myself more forcibly." The work contains varying brushstrokes, some straight, some turbulent – which allow us to see the movement of energy "like water in a rushing stream." Émile Bernard, Van Gogh's friend, was the initial owner of this painting in its provenance.

== Legacy ==
Camille died from tuberculosis in 1922, which he contracted during World War I. Armand worked as a police officer and died in 1945. Due to Marcelle's youth when she met Van Gogh, her death in 1980, at age 91 made her one of the last people to have met him.

Many of Van Gogh's paintings in Arles were sent to his brother Theo, but he kept his paintings of Joseph Roulin. These were among the paintings that remained with his landlords, the Ginoux, when he left in May 1889. It is unknown if he left these paintings as a gift or in storage and that they were discovered after his death. In 1900, Joseph sold six paintings to Ambroise Vollard for 450 francs, equivalent to €2,100 in 2025; The Red Vineyard, the only painting Van Gogh sold in his lifetime, was sold for 400 francs.

Only two of the portraits, for Camille and Marcelle, remained with Theo Van Gogh's family and eventually became a part of the Van Gogh Museum's collection. The portrait of Augustine held by the Museum of Fine Arts, Boston suffered from fading, with the pink portions of the flowers fading to white. One of the portraits of Armand sold for $13 million in 1995, while a portrait of Marcelle was sold for $8 million in 2015.

12 of the paintings, on loan from museums around the world, were featured together for the Van Gogh and the Roulins. Together Again at Last exhibition by the Museum of Fine Arts, Boston, which has two of the paintings in its collection, from 30 March to 7 September 2025. 15 paintings will be shown at the Van Gogh Museum from 3 October 2025 to 11 January 2026. This is the largest exhibition of the Roulin Family portraits.

Image	Subject	Provenance	Location	Dimensions	References
	Joseph Roulin	Joseph and Marie Ginoux (1889–9 July 1897); Ambroise Vollard (9 July 1897–1 September 1897); Cornelis Hoogendijk (1 September 1897–22 May 1912); Carl Sternheim and Thea Sternheim (22 May 1912–1928); Étienne Bignou (1928); Knoedler and the Lefevre Gallery (1928); Robert Treat Paine II (1928–1935); Museum of Fine Arts, Boston (1935–present)	Museum of Fine Arts, Boston	81.3 cm × 65.4 cm (32.0 in × 25.7 in)	
	Joseph Roulin				
	Joseph Roulin				
	Joseph Roulin				
	Joseph Roulin				
	Augustine Roulin				
	Augustine Roulin				
	Augustine Roulin				
	Augustine Roulin				
	Augustine Roulin				
	Augustine Roulin				
	Augustine Roulin				
	Armand Roulin				
	Armand Roulin				
	Armand Roulin				
	Camille Roulin	Theo van Gogh (1889–25 January 1891); Johanna van Gogh-Bonger (25 January 1891–2 September 1925); Vincent Willem van Gogh (2 September 1925–10 July 1965); Vincent van Gogh Foundation (10 July 1965–present)	Van Gogh Museum	40.5 cm × 32.5 cm	
	Camille Roulin	Amédée Schuffenecker (1901); Julius Meier-Graefe (1901–1905); Paul Cassirer (1905–1909); Julius Meier-Graefe (1909–1912); Paul Cassirer (1912–1916); Marius de Zayas (1921–1923); Josef Stránský (1931–1936); Wildenstein & Company (1936–1940); Rodolphe Meyer de Schauensee (1940–1973); Philadelphia Museum of Art (1973–present)	Philadelphia Museum of Art	43.2 cm × 34.9 cm (17 in × 13.75 in)	
	Camille Roulin				
	Marcelle Roulin				
	Marcelle Roulin	Theo van Gogh (1889–25 January 1891); Johanna van Gogh-Bonger (25 January 1891–2 September 1925); Vincent Willem van Gogh (2 September 1925–10 July 1965); Vincent van Gogh Foundation (10 July 1965–present)	Van Gogh Museum	35.2 cm × 24.6 cm	
	Marcelle Roulin	Arles hospital (disputed); Kraushaar Galleries (?–9 March 1927); Chester Dale (9 March 1927–1963); National Gallery of Art (1963–present)	National Gallery of Art	35 cm × 23.9 cm (13.75 in × 9.44 in)	
	Marcelle Roulin; Augustine Roulin	Knoedler and Paul Guillaume (1937–1946); William McIntire Elkins and Elizabeth Elkins (1946–1950); Philadelphia Museum of Art (1950–present)	Philadelphia Museum of Art	92.4 cm × 73.5 cm (36.38 in × 28.94 in)	
	Marcelle Roulin; Augustine Roulin	Joseph and Marie Ginoux (1889–1896); Ambroise Vollard (1896–1898); Eugène Blot (1898–1935); Paul von Mendelssohn-Bartholdy and family (1935–1946); Walter Feilchenfeldt (1946–1948); Robert Lehman (1948–1968); Metropolitan Museum of Art (1968–present)	Metropolitan Museum of Art	63.5 cm × 50.8 cm (25.0 in × 20.0 in)	

== See also ==
- List of works by Vincent van Gogh
- Portraits by Vincent van Gogh
- Paintings of Children (Van Gogh series)

== Works cited ==
=== News ===
- Anderson, Sonja (19 March 2025). "Why Did Vincent van Gogh Paint 26 Portraits of a Postman and His Family While Staying in the South of France?". Smithsonian.
- Bailey, Martin (11 October 2024). "Van Gogh's postman: the artist's favourite portrait subject to be explored in Boston and Amsterdam shows". The Art Newspaper. Archived from the original on 20 March 2025.
- Bailey, Martin (14 March 2025). "You've got mail: pathbreaking exhibition on Van Gogh's postman opens shortly in Boston, then heads to Amsterdam". The Art Newspaper. Archived from the original on 21 March 2025.
- Mimms, Walker (19 June 2025). "When van Gogh Fled South, This Family Gave Him Purpose". New York Times. Archived from the original on 25 June 2025.
- Nicholls-Lee, Deborah (18 March 2025). "'A very deep bond of friendship': The surprising story of Van Gogh's guardian angel". BBC. Archived from the original on 20 March 2025.

=== Web ===
- "Madame Roulin and Her Baby". Metropolitan Museum of Art. Archived from the original on 21 March 2025.
- "Portrait of Camille Roulin". Philadelphia Museum of Art. Archived from the original on 21 March 2025.
- "Portrait of Camille Roulin". Van Gogh Museum. Archived from the original on 21 March 2025.
- "Portrait of Madame Augustine Roulin and Baby Marcelle". Philadelphia Museum of Art. Archived from the original on 21 March 2025.
- "Portrait of Marcelle Roulin". Van Gogh Museum. Archived from the original on 21 March 2025.
- "Postman Joseph Roulin". Museum of Fine Arts, Boston. Archived from the original on 20 March 2025.
- "Robert Lehman Collection, The Metropolitan Museum of Art". Robert Lehman Foundation. Archived from the original on 21 March 2025.
- "Roulin's Baby, 1888". National Gallery of Art. Archived from the original on 21 March 2025.
- "Van Gogh and the Roulins. Together Again at Last". Van Gogh Museum. 11 March 2025. Archived from the original on 20 March 2025.
