= Loving Vincent =

2017 animated biographical drama film

- Theatrical release poster
- Directed by: Dorota Kobiela; Hugh Welchman
- Written by: Dorota Kobiela; Hugh Welchman; Jacek Dehnel
- Produced by: Hugh Welchman; Ivan Mactaggart; Sean M. Bobbitt
- Starring: Robert Gulaczyk; Douglas Booth; Jerome Flynn; Saoirse Ronan; Helen McCrory; Chris O'Dowd; John Sessions; Eleanor Tomlinson; Aidan Turner
- Cinematography: Tristan Oliver; Łukasz Żal
- Edited by: Dorota Kobiela; Justyna Wierszynska
- Music by: Clint Mansell
- Production companies: BreakThru Films; Trademark Films; Silver Reel
- Distributed by: Altitude Film Distribution (United Kingdom); Next Film (Poland)
- Release dates: 12 June 2017 (Annecy); 22 September 2017 (United States); 6 October 2017 (Poland); 13 October 2017 (United Kingdom)
- Running time: 95 minutes
- Countries: Poland; United Kingdom
- Language: English
- Budget: $5.5 million
- Box office: $42.1 million

Loving Vincent is a 2017 experimental adult animated historical drama film directed by Dorota Kobiela and Hugh Welchman, and written by Kobiela, Welchman, and Jacek Dehnel. It is based on the life of the painter Vincent van Gogh, in particular the circumstances of his death. It is the first fully painted animated feature film. The film is a co-production between Poland and the United Kingdom, funded by the Polish Film Institute, and partially through a Kickstarter campaign. The film stars Robert Gulaczyk, Douglas Booth, Jerome Flynn, Saoirse Ronan, Helen McCrory, Chris O'Dowd, John Sessions, Eleanor Tomlinson, and Aidan Turner.

First conceived as a seven-minute short film in 2008, Loving Vincent was realized by Kobiela, a painter herself, after studying the techniques and the artist's story through his letters. With an additional use of rotoscoping animation, each of the film's 65,000 frames is an oil painting on canvas, created using the same techniques as Van Gogh by a team of 125 artists drawn from around the globe. The film premiered at the 2017 Annecy International Animated Film Festival. The film received critical acclaim and won Best Animated Feature Film Award at the 30th European Film Awards in Berlin and was nominated for Best Animated Feature at the 90th Academy Awards. The film marked Helen McCrory's final film role before her death in April 2021.

== Plot ==
One year after Vincent van Gogh's suicide, postman Joseph Roulin asks his son Armand to deliver Van Gogh's last letter to his brother, Theo. Roulin finds the death suspicious, as merely weeks earlier Van Gogh claimed through letters that his mood was calm and normal. Armand reluctantly agrees and heads for Paris.

Père Tanguy, a Montmartre art supplier, tells Armand that Theo actually died six months after Vincent. He suggests that Armand travel to Auvers-sur-Oise and look for Dr. Paul Gachet, who housed Van Gogh after his release from an asylum, shared his love for art, and attended the funeral. Once there, Armand learns that the doctor is out on business, so he stays at the same inn that Van Gogh did during his time in the area. There, he meets the temporary proprietress Adeline Ravoux, who was fond of Van Gogh and also surprised by his death. At her suggestion, Armand visits the local boatman, who informs him that Van Gogh kept close company with Dr. Gachet's sheltered daughter, Marguerite. When Armand visits her, Marguerite denies and is angered when Armand implies that Van Gogh's suicidal mood could have resulted from an argument with her father.

Throughout the investigation, Armand begins to suspect a local boy named René Secretan, who reportedly liked to torment Van Gogh, owned a gun, and had often drunkenly brandished it around town. Dr. Mazery, who examined Van Gogh, also claims that the shot must have come from a few feet away, ruling out suicide. When Armand implicates René, Marguerite confesses that she was in close, but not romantic, relations with Van Gogh, but she does not believe that René was capable of murder.

Dr. Gachet finally returns and promises to deliver Armand's letter to Theo's widow. He admits there was an argument between them – Van Gogh accused Gachet of being a coward for not pursuing his dreams, to which Gachet angrily accused Van Gogh of worsening Theo's health by overly depending on his brother. Gachet posits that this accusation drove Van Gogh to suicide in order to release Theo from the burden. After Armand returns home, postman Roulin later receives word from Theo's widow, Johanna, thanking Armand for returning the letter. Johanna attaches to her letter to Armand one of Van Gogh's letters to her – signed, "Your loving Vincent."

== Cast ==
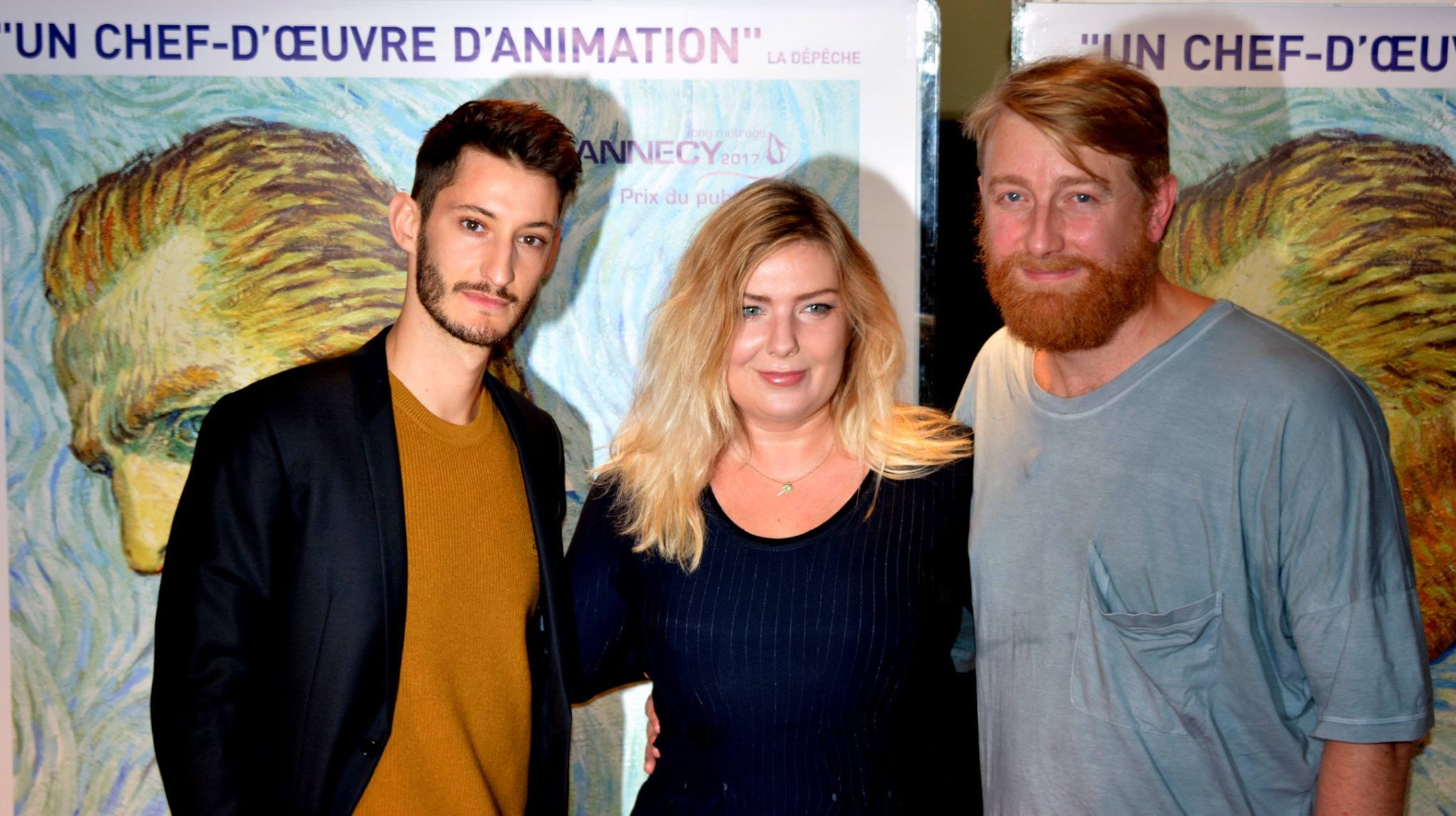
Directors Dorota Kobiela (center) and Hugh Welchman (right) at the film's French premiere in Paris, with actor Pierre Niney (left).

The leading cast is as follows:

- Robert Gulaczyk as Vincent van Gogh
- Douglas Booth as Armand Roulin
- Jerome Flynn as Paul Gachet
- Saoirse Ronan as Marguerite Gachet
- Helen McCrory as Louise Chevalier
- Chris O'Dowd as Postman Joseph Roulin
- John Sessions as Père Tanguy
- Eleanor Tomlinson as Adeline Ravoux
- Aidan Turner as Boatman
- James Greene as Old Man
- Bill Thomas as Dr. Mazery
- Martin Herdman as Gendarme Rigaumon
- Robin Hodges as Lieutenant Milliet
- Josh Burdett as the Zouave
- Holly Earl as La Mousmé
- Graham Pavey as Mr Ravoux
- Joe Stuckey as Idiot Boy
- Piotr Pamula as Paul Gauguin
- Cezary Lukaszewicz as Theo van Gogh
- Marcin Sosinski as René Secretan

== Production ==
The filmmakers chose classically trained painters over traditional animators because, as Welchman said later, he wanted to avoid artists with "personalised styles" and employ people who were "very pure oil painters" instead. A total of 125 painters from over 20 countries traveled to Poland to work on the project following selection from around 5,000 applicants, many of whom responded to an online "recruitment teaser". The number of participants was greater than originally envisaged, which meant that due to difficulties in obtaining funding the task had to be completed in a correspondingly shorter period of time.

The creation of the film storyboard was informed by Van Gogh's paintings, sometimes with only minor alterations to the latter, but on occasions more complex transformations involving changes to the weather or time of day were carried out. Since artists typically painted over frames once they had been photographed, only 1,000 of the total 65,000 paintings produced during the course of the project survived.

The film uses a form of rotoscoping. Production for the film began with a live-action cast filming against a green screen. After filming, editors composited Van Gogh's paintings into scene backgrounds and finally cut the film together as usual. However, once the actual film was complete, they shot each individual frame onto a blank canvas, and artists painted over each image. In all the project took 6 years to complete, and in describing the laborious process involved Welchman noted that the film's creators had "definitely without a doubt invented the slowest form of filmmaking ever devised in 120 years."

== Reception ==
=== Box office ===
The movie is considered a box office success, grossing over an estimated $42.1 million (in USD) worldwide on a budget of $5.5 million, with United States earnings totaling $6.7 million. The film has most notably grossed $3 million in South Korea, $2.1 million in Italy, and $10.8 million in China.

=== Critical response ===
On the review aggregator Rotten Tomatoes, the film has an approval rating of 84% based on 161 reviews, with an average rating of 7.3/10. The website's critical consensus states, "Loving Vincent's dazzling visual achievements make this Van Gogh biopic well worth seeking out – even if its narrative is far less effectively composed." Metacritic reports a score of 62 out of 100 based on 21 critics, indicating "generally favorable reviews".

A. O. Scott, writing for The New York Times, found the visual aspects of the film to be innovative, stating: "the viewer also becomes accustomed to the images, and astonishment at the film's innovative, painstaking technique begins to fade. But its charm never quite wears off, for reasons summed up in the title." Actress Angourie Rice had similar sentiments, writing in an essay that “it was such a fascinating experience to witness the actors’ performances turned into Van Gogh style paintings. The great thing about this film is that it also made me question what the merging of art forms meant for art, film, and everything in between.”

Giuseppe Sedia of the Krakow Post praised the impressive visual style of the movie. However, he added, "In their concern to keep the viewers interested, directors Kobiela and Welchman have built an over-narrated and spirit-dampening movie in which the preponderance of the dialogues hinders the viewers’ immersion into the violent beauty and materiality of Van Gogh’s oeuvre".

In one of the most positive reviews, Cameron Meier of The Orlando Weekly called it "the best animated film of this century and the most nobly conceived of all time."

== Awards and accolades ==
The film won the "Most Popular International Feature" award at the 2017 Vancouver International Film Festival. It was nominated in the Hollywood Music in Media Awards 2017 for Best Original Score in an Animated Film. It won the Audience Award at the 2017 Annecy International Animated Film Festival and the Golden Goblet for Best Animation Film at the Shanghai International Film Festival. It won the XII Festival de Cine Inédito de Mérida (FCIM) after obtaining the highest score among the projected films and also the highest score obtained in the history of the event. On 9 December 2017, the film won Best Animated Feature Film Award at the 30th European Film Awards in Berlin. The film also received Best Animated Feature nominations at both the Academy Awards and Golden Globes.

Year	Ceremony	Category	Recipient(s)	Result	Ref.
2017	30th European Film Awards	Best Animated Feature Film	Dorota Kobiela, Hugh Welchman	Won	
2017	Columbus Film Critics Association Awards	Best Animated Feature	Loving Vincent	Runner-up	
2017	Shanghai International Film Festival	Best Animation Film	Dorota Kobiela, Hugh Welchman	Won	
2017	Hollywood Music in Media Awards 2017	Best Original Score	Clint Mansell	Nominated	
2017	Florida Film Critics Circle	Best Animated Film	Loving Vincent	Nominated	
2018	Vilnius International Film Festival	The Audience Award	Loving Vincent	Won	
2018	75th Golden Globe Awards	Best Animated Feature Film	Dorota Kobiela and Hugh Welchman	Nominated	
2018	St. Louis Film Critics Association	Best Animated Feature	Dorota Kobiela and Hugh Welchman	Nominated	
2018	Washington, D.C. Area Film Critics Association Awards	Best Animated Feature	Dorota Kobiela and Hugh Welchman	Nominated	
2018	22nd Satellite Awards	Best Animated or Mixed Media Feature	Loving Vincent	Nominated	
2018	Boston Society of Film Critics	Best Animated Film	Loving Vincent	2nd Place	
2018	23rd Critics' Choice Awards	Best Animated Feature	Dorota Kobiela and Hugh Welchman	Nominated	
2018	90th Academy Awards	Best Animated Feature	Dorota Kobiela, Hugh Welchman and Ivan Mactaggart	Nominated	
2018	45th Annie Awards	Best Animated Feature — Independent	Hugh Welchman and Ivan Mactaggart	Nominated	
2018	45th Annie Awards	Outstanding Achievement for Music in an Animated Feature Production	Clint Mansell	Nominated	
2018	45th Annie Awards	Outstanding Achievement for Writing in an Animated Feature Production	Dorota Kobiela, Hugh Welchman and Jacek Dehnel	Nominated	
2018	71st British Academy Film Awards	Best Animated Film	Dorota Kobiela, Hugh Welchman and Ivan Mactaggart	Nominated	
2018	St. Louis Film Critics Association	Best Animated Feature	Dorota Kobiela, Hugh Welchman and Ivan Mactaggart	Nominated	
2018	Alliance of Women Film Journalists	Best Animated Film	Dorota Kobiela, Hugh Welchman and Ivan Mactaggart	Won	
2018	Georgia Film Critics Association	Best Animated Film	Dorota Kobiela, Hugh Welchman and Ivan Mactaggart	Nominated	
2018	Art Directors Guild	Production Design in an Animated Feature	Matthew Button	Nominated	
2018	Golden Eagle Award (Russia)	Best Foreign Language Film	Loving Vincent	Won	
