= Ivan Mactaggart =

British film producer

Ivan Mactaggart is a British film producer best known for his 2017 production Loving Vincent, which earned him an Academy Award nomination for Best Animated Feature at the 90th Academy Awards and a BAFTA Award nomination for Best Animated Film.

== Biography ==
Ivan Mactaggart has previously worked for several production companies (BBC Film, BBC Worldwide, Baker Street Media Finance, BMS Finance, the latter being where he worked on the production of Moon and Made in Dagenham). Since 2010, he was a partner at David Parfitt's Trademark Films before setting up the film and TV production company Cambridge Picture Company in 2018. In 2019, Cambridge Picture joined the production of the period drama series The Galapagos Affair. In 2020, he bought options on nine short stories by Mike Carey to create a TV drama series. In 2024, Cambridge Picture announced the production of Niall Johnson's feature film Humanoid.
