= DK Welchman =

Polish filmmaker

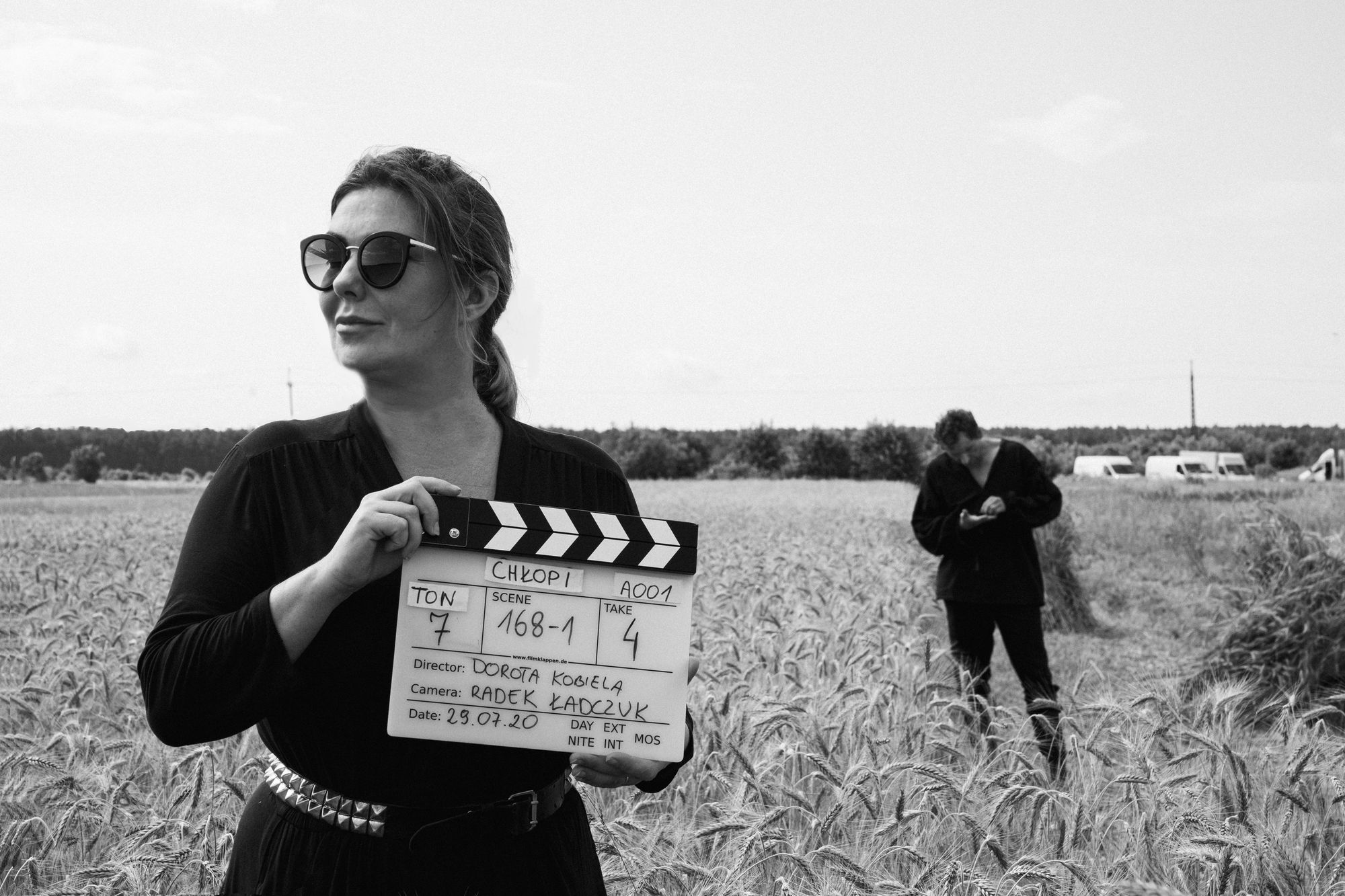
- Kobiela in 2017
- Born: 1978 (age 47–48); Bytom, Poland
- Education: Academy of Fine Arts in Warsaw
- Occupations: director, producer and screenwriter
- Years active: 2004–present

Dorota Karolina Welchman (née Kobiela) (born 1978) is a Polish filmmaker, screenwriter, and producer. She is best known for co-directing her first fully painted animated feature film Loving Vincent (2017) with her husband Hugh Welchman.

== Career ==
DK Welchman conceived Loving Vincent as a 7-minute short movie in 2008, Loving Vincent was idealized by Kobiela, a painter herself, after studying the techniques and the artist's story through his letters.

== Filmography ==
- 2023: The Peasants (directed, writer)
- 2017: Loving Vincent (directed, writer, editor, visual effects)
- 2011: Little Postman (short, director, writer)
- 2011: Chopin's Drawings (short, director, writer)
- 2011: The Flying Machine (short, director, writer)

== Awards and nominations ==
Year	Ceremony	Category	Recipient(s)	Result	Ref.
2017	Shanghai International Film Festival	Best Animation Film	DK Welchman, Hugh Welchman	Won	
2018	75th Golden Globe Awards	Best Animated Feature Film	DK Welchman and Hugh Welchman	Nominated	
2018	St. Louis Film Critics Association	Best Animated Feature	DK Welchman and Hugh Welchman	Nominated	
2018	Washington, D.C. Area Film Critics Association Awards	Best Animated Feature	DK Welchman and Hugh Welchman	Nominated	
2018	23rd Critics' Choice Awards	Best Animated Feature	DK Welchman and Hugh Welchman	Nominated	
2018	90th Academy Awards	Best Animated Feature	DK Welchman, Hugh Welchman and Ivan Mactaggart	Nominated	
2018	30th European Film Awards	Best Animated Feature Film	DK Welchman, Hugh Welchman	Won	
2018	45th Annie Awards	Outstanding Achievement for Writing in an Animated Feature Production	DK Welchman, Hugh Welchman and Jacek Dehnel	Nominated	
2018	71st British Academy Film Awards	Best Animated Film	DK Welchman, Hugh Welchman and Ivan Mactaggart	Nominated	
2018	North Texas Film Critics Association	Best Animated Film	DK Welchman and Hugh Welchman	2nd Place	
2018	St. Louis Film Critics Association	Best Animated Feature	DK Welchman and Hugh Welchman	Nominated	
