= List of submissions for the Academy Award for Best Animated Feature =

This is a list of submissions for the Academy Award for Best Animated Feature since it started in 2001 (where DreamWorks Animation's Shrek was the inaugural winner.). An animated feature is defined by the academy as a film with a running time of more than 40 minutes in which characters' performances are created using a frame-by-frame technique, a significant number of the major characters are animated, and animation figures in no less than 75 percent of the running time.

== History ==
The entire AMPAS membership has been eligible to choose the winner since the award's inception. If there are sixteen or more films submitted for the category, the winner is voted from a shortlist of five films, which has happened nine times, otherwise there will only be three films on the shortlist. Additionally, eight eligible animated features must have been theatrically released in Los Angeles County within the calendar year for this category to be activated.

Some submissions to the Best Animated Feature category were live-action/animation hybrids, but only three films were disqualified for not meeting the 75 percent threshold. This happened with Arthur and the Invisibles in 2006, Yogi Bear in 2010, and The Smurfs in 2011. Consequently, the former two disqualifications reduced the shortlist from five films to three films in 2006 and 2010 respectively, while the latter in 2011 did not.

Only one submission was withdrawn from the competition. This happened in 2020 when The SpongeBob Movie: Sponge on the Run was withdrawn for failing to complete qualification runs needed to be eligible.

== 2000s ==
=== 2001 ===
Film	Director(s)	Studio(s)	Production Country	Result
Final Fantasy: The Spirits Within	Hironobu Sakaguchi	Square Pictures	Japan; United States	Not nominated
Jimmy Neutron: Boy Genius	John A. Davis	Nickelodeon Movies, O Entertainment, DNA Productions	United States	Nominated
Marco Polo: Return to Xanadu	Ron Merk	The Tooniversal Company	Australia	Not nominated
Monsters, Inc.	Pete Docter	Pixar Animation Studios	United States	Nominated
Osmosis Jones	Tom Sito and Piet Kroon	Warner Bros. Feature Animation	United States	Not nominated
The Prince of Light	Yugo Sako	Nippon Ramayana Film Co.	Japan; India	Not nominated
Shrek	Andrew Adamson and Vicky Jenson	DreamWorks Animation	United States	Won Academy Award
The Trumpet of the Swan	Richard Rich and Terry L. Noss	RichCrest Animation Studios	United States	Not nominated
Waking Life	Richard Linklater	Thousand Words	United States	Not nominated

=== 2002 ===
Film	Director(s)	Studio(s)	Production Country	Result
Adam Sandler's Eight Crazy Nights	Seth Kearsley	Happy Madison Productions	United States	Not nominated
Alibaba & the Forty Thieves	Usha Ganesarajah	Pentamedia Graphics	India	Not nominated
Eden	Andrzej Czeczot	Unknown	Poland	Not nominated
Hey Arnold!: The Movie	Tuck Tucker	Nickelodeon Movies, Snee-Oosh	United States	Not nominated
Ice Age	Chris Wedge	Blue Sky Studios	United States	Nominated
Jonah: A VeggieTales Movie	Phil Vischer and Mike Nawrocki	Big Idea Entertainment	United States	Not nominated
Lilo & Stitch	Chris Sanders and Dean DeBlois	Walt Disney Feature Animation	United States	Nominated
The Living Forest	Manolo Gómez and Ángel de la Cruz	Dygra Films	Spain	Not nominated
Mutant Aliens	Bill Plympton	Plymptoons	United States	Not nominated
The Powerpuff Girls Movie	Craig McCracken	Cartoon Network Studios	United States	Not nominated
The Princess and the Pea	Mark Swan	Swan Productions	United States	Not nominated
Return to Never Land	Donovan Cook and Robin Budd	Disneytoon Studios	United States	Not nominated
Spirit: Stallion of the Cimarron	Kelly Asbury and Lorna Cook	DreamWorks Animation	United States	Nominated
Spirited Away	Hayao Miyazaki	Studio Ghibli	Japan	Won Academy Award
Stuart Little 2	Rob Minkoff	Columbia Pictures	United States	Not nominated
Treasure Planet	Ron Clements and John Musker	Walt Disney Feature Animation	United States	Nominated
The Wild Thornberrys Movie	Cathy Malkasian and Jeff McGrath	Nickelodeon Movies, Klasky Csupo	United States	Not nominated

=== 2003 ===
Film	Director(s)	Studio(s)	Production Country	Result
Brother Bear	Aaron Blaise and Robert Walker	Walt Disney Feature Animation	United States	Nominated
Finding Nemo	Andrew Stanton	Pixar Animation Studios	United States	Won Academy Award
Jester Till	Eberhard Junkersdorf	Munich Animation	Germany	Not nominated
The Jungle Book 2	Steve Trenbirth	Disneytoon Studios	United States	Not nominated
Looney Tunes: Back in Action	Joe Dante	Warner Bros. Feature Animation	United States	Not nominated
Millennium Actress	Satoshi Kon	Madhouse	Japan	Not nominated
Piglet's Big Movie	Francis Glebas	Disneytoon Studios	United States	Not nominated
Pokémon Heroes	Kunihiko Yuyama	OLM, Inc.	Japan	Not nominated
Rugrats Go Wild	Norton Virgien and John Eng	Nickelodeon Movies, Klasky Csupo	United States	Not nominated
Tokyo Godfathers	Satoshi Kon	Madhouse	Japan	Not nominated
The Triplets of Belleville	Sylvain Chomet	Les Armateurs	France	Nominated

=== 2004 ===
Film	Director(s)	Studio(s)	Production Country	Result
Clifford's Really Big Movie	Robert Ramirez and Steve Trenbirth	Scholastic Entertainment	United States	Not nominated
Ghost in the Shell 2: Innocence	Mamoru Oshii	Production I.G; Studio Ghibli	Japan	Not nominated
Home on the Range	Will Finn and John Sanford	Walt Disney Feature Animation	United States	Not nominated
The Incredibles	Brad Bird	Pixar Animation Studios	United States	Won Academy Award
The Legend of Buddha	Shamboo Falke	Pentamedia Graphics Ltd	India	Not nominated
The Polar Express	Robert Zemeckis	Castle Rock Entertainment, ImageMovers	United States	Not nominated
Shrek 2	Andrew Adamson, Kelly Asbury and Conrad Vernon	DreamWorks Animation	United States	Nominated
Shark Tale	Vicky Jenson, Bibo Bergeron and Rob Letterman	DreamWorks Animation	United States	Nominated
Sky Blue	Kim Moon-saeng	Endgame Productions Inc.	South Korea	Not nominated
The SpongeBob SquarePants Movie	Stephen Hillenburg	Nickelodeon Movies, United Plankton Pictures	United States	Not nominated
Teacher's Pet	Timothy Björklund	Disney Television Animation	United States	Not nominated

=== 2005 ===
Film	Director(s)	Studio(s)	Production Country	Result
Chicken Little	Mark Dindal	Walt Disney Feature Animation	United States	Not nominated
Gulliver's Travel	Anita Udeep	Pentamedia Graphics	India	Not nominated
Hoodwinked!	Cory Edwards, Todd Edwards and Tony Leech	Kanbar Entertainment	United States	Not nominated
Howl's Moving Castle	Hayao Miyazaki	Studio Ghibli	Japan	Nominated
Madagascar	Eric Darnell and Tom McGrath	DreamWorks Animation	United States	Not nominated
Robots	Chris Wedge	Blue Sky Studios	United States	Not nominated
Steamboy	Katsuhiro Otomo	Sunrise	Japan	Not nominated
Tim Burton's Corpse Bride	Mike Johnson and Tim Burton	Tim Burton Productions, Laika	United States	Nominated
Valiant	Gary Chapman	Vanguard Animation	United Kingdom; United States	Not nominated
Wallace & Gromit: The Curse of the Were-Rabbit	Nick Park and Steve Box	Aardman Animations	United Kingdom; United States	Won Academy Award

=== 2006 ===
Film	Director(s)	Studio(s)	Production Country	Result
The Ant Bully	John A. Davis	Legendary Pictures, DNA Productions, Warner Bros. Pictures	United States	Not nominated
~~Arthur and the Invisibles~~ (Note: Arthur and the Invisibles was disqualified for not meeting the requirements of the rules, which required 75% of the entire film to be animated)	~~Luc Besson~~	~~EuropaCorp~~, ~~Canal+~~	France	Disqualified
Barnyard	Steve Oedekerk	Paramount Pictures, Nickelodeon Movies, O Entertainment	United States	Not nominated
Cars	John Lasseter	Pixar Animation Studios	United States	Nominated
Curious George	Matthew O'Callaghan	Universal Pictures, Imagine Entertainment, Universal Animation Studios	United States; Germany	Not nominated
Everyone's Hero	Christopher Reeve, Daniel St. Pierre and Colin Brady	IDT Entertainment, 20th Century Fox	United States	Not nominated
Flushed Away	David Bowers and Sam Fell	Aardman Animations, DreamWorks Animation	United Kingdom; United States	Not nominated
Happy Feet	George Miller	Animal Logic, Village Roadshow Pictures, Warner Bros. Pictures	Australia; United States	Won Academy Award
Ice Age: The Meltdown	Carlos Saldanha	Blue Sky Studios, 20th Century Fox	United States	Not nominated
Monster House	Gil Kenan	ImageMovers, Amblin Entertainment, Columbia Pictures	United States	Nominated
Open Season	Jill Culton and Roger Allers	Sony Pictures Animation, Columbia Pictures	United States	Not nominated
Over the Hedge	Tim Johnson and Karey Kirkpatrick	DreamWorks Animation	United States	Not nominated
Paprika	Satoshi Kon	Madhouse	Japan	Not nominated
Renaissance	Christian Volckman	Onyx Films, Millimages, LuxAnimation	France	Not nominated
A Scanner Darkly	Richard Linklater	Thousand Words	United States	Not nominated
The Wild	Steve "Spaz" Williams	C.O.R.E. Feature Animation, Walt Disney Pictures	United States	Not nominated

=== 2007 ===
Film	Director(s)	Studio(s)	Production Country	Result
Alvin and the Chipmunks	Tim Hill	Regency Enterprises; Bagdasarian Company	United States	Not nominated
Aqua Teen Hunger Force Colon Movie Film for Theaters	Matt Maiellaro and Dave Willis	Adult Swim, Williams Street	United States	Not nominated
Bee Movie	Simon J. Smith and Steve Hickner	DreamWorks Animation	United States	Not nominated
Beowulf	Robert Zemeckis	ImageMovers	United States	Not nominated
Meet the Robinsons	Stephen Anderson	Walt Disney Animation Studios	United States	Not nominated
Persepolis	Marjane Satrapi and Vincent Paronnaud	Celluloid Dreams	France	Nominated
Ratatouille	Brad Bird	Pixar Animation Studios	United States	Won Academy Award
Shrek the Third	Chris Miller and Raman Hui	DreamWorks Animation	United States	Not nominated
The Simpsons Movie	David Silverman	Gracie Films, Rough Draft Studios	United States	Not nominated
Surf's Up	Ash Brannon and Chris Buck	Sony Pictures Animation	United States	Nominated
Tekkonkinkreet	Michael Arias	Studio 4°C	Japan	Not nominated
TMNT	Kevin Munroe	Imagi Animation Studios	United States; Hong Kong	Not nominated

=== 2008 ===
Film	Director(s)	Studio(s)	Production Country	Result
Bolt	Chris Williams and Byron Howard	Walt Disney Animation Studios	United States	Nominated
Delgo	Marc F. Adler and Jason Maurer	Electric Eye Entertainment Corporation	United States	Not nominated
Dr. Seuss' Horton Hears a Who!	Jimmy Hayward and Steve Martino	Blue Sky Studios	United States	Not nominated
Dragon Hunters	Guillaume Ivernel and Arthur Qwak	Futurikon, LuxAnimation, Trixter, Mac Guff Ligne	France; Luxembourg; Germany	Not nominated
Fly Me to the Moon	Ben Stassen	nWave Pictures	Belgium; United States	Not nominated
Igor	Tony Leondis	Exodus Film Group	United States	Not nominated
Kung Fu Panda	John Stevenson and Mark Osborne	DreamWorks Animation	United States	Nominated
Madagascar: Escape 2 Africa	Eric Darnell and Tom McGrath	DreamWorks Animation	United States	Not nominated
$9.99	Tatia Rosenthal	Lama Films	Australia	Not nominated
The Sky Crawlers	Mamoru Oshii	Production I.G	Japan	Not nominated
Sword of the Stranger	Masahiro Andō	Bones	Japan	Not nominated
The Tale of Despereaux	Sam Fell and Robert Stevenhagen	Framestore Feature Animation, Universal Animation Studios	United Kingdom; United States	Not nominated
WALL-E	Andrew Stanton	Pixar Animation Studios	United States	Won Academy Award
Waltz with Bashir	Ari Folman	Bridgit Folman Film Gang, Les Films d'Ici, Razor Film Produktion	Israel; Germany; France	Not nominated

=== 2009 ===
Film	Director(s)	Studio(s)	Production Country	Result
Alvin and the Chipmunks: The Squeakquel	Betty Thomas	Regency Enterprises, Bagdasarian Company	United States	Not nominated
Astro Boy	David Bowers	Imagi Animation Studios	United States; Hong Kong	Not nominated
Battle for Terra	Aristomenis Tsirbas	Roadside Attractions	United States	Not nominated
Cloudy with a Chance of Meatballs	Phil Lord and Christopher Miller	Sony Pictures Animation	United States	Not nominated
Coraline	Henry Selick	Laika	United States	Nominated
Disney's A Christmas Carol	Robert Zemeckis	ImageMovers Digital	United States	Not nominated
The Dolphin: Story of a Dreamer	Eduardo Schuldt	Passworld, Dolphin Films	Peru	Not nominated
Fantastic Mr. Fox	Wes Anderson	American Empirical Pictures, Regency Enterprises, Indian Paintbrush	United States	Nominated
Ice Age: Dawn of the Dinosaurs	Carlos Saldanha	Blue Sky Studios	United States	Not nominated
Mary and Max	Adam Elliot	Melodrama Pictures	Australia	Not nominated
The Missing Lynx	Raul Garcia and Manuel Sicilia	Kandor Graphics	United Kingdom; Spain	Not nominated
Monsters vs. Aliens	Conrad Vernon and Rob Letterman	DreamWorks Animation	United States	Not nominated
9	Shane Acker	Focus Features	United States	Not nominated
Planet 51	Jorge Blanco	Ilion Animation Studios	Spain; United Kingdom; United States	Not nominated
Ponyo	Hayao Miyazaki	Studio Ghibli	Japan	Not nominated
The Princess and the Frog	Ron Clements and John Musker	Walt Disney Animation Studios	United States	Nominated
The Secret of Kells	Tomm Moore	Cartoon Saloon	Ireland; France; Belgium	Nominated
Tinker Bell and the Lost Treasure	Klay Hall	Disneytoon Studios	United States	Not nominated
A Town Called Panic	Stéphane Aubier and Vincent Patar	La Parti Productions, Coproduction Office	Belgium; Luxembourg; France	Not nominated
Up	Pete Docter	Pixar Animation Studios	United States	Won Academy Award

== 2010s ==
=== 2010 ===
Film	Director(s)	Studio(s)	Production Country	Result
Alpha and Omega	Anthony Bell	Crest Animation Productions	United States	Not nominated
Cats & Dogs: The Revenge of Kitty Galore	Brad Peyton	Village Roadshow Pictures	United States; Australia	Not nominated
Despicable Me	Pierre Coffin and Chris Renaud	Illumination Entertainment	United States	Not nominated
The Dreams of Jinsha	Daming Chen	Hangzhou C&L Digital Prod. Co.	China	Not nominated
How to Train Your Dragon	Chris Sanders and Dean DeBlois	DreamWorks Animation	United States	Nominated
Idiots and Angels	Bill Plympton	Plymptoons Studio	United States	Not nominated
The Illusionist	Sylvain Chomet	Pathé, Django Films	France; United Kingdom	Nominated
Legend of the Guardians: The Owls of Ga'Hoole	Zack Snyder	GOG Productions	Australia; United States	Not nominated
Megamind	Tom McGrath	DreamWorks Animation	United States	Not nominated
My Dog Tulip	Paul Fierlinger	Axiom Films	United States	Not nominated
Shrek Forever After	Mike Mitchell	DreamWorks Animation	United States	Not nominated
Summer Wars	Mamoru Hosoda	Madhouse	Japan	Not nominated
Tangled	Nathan Greno and Byron Howard	Walt Disney Animation Studios	United States	Not nominated
Tinker Bell and the Great Fairy Rescue	Bradley Raymond	Disneytoon Studios	United States	Not nominated
Toy Story 3	Lee Unkrich	Pixar Animation Studios	United States	Won Academy Award
~~Yogi Bear~~ (Note: Yogi Bear was disqualified for not meeting the requirements of the rules, which required 75% of the entire film to be animated)	~~Eric Brevig~~	~~Sunswept Entertainment~~, ~~De Line Pictures,~~ ~~Rhythm and Hues Studios~~	United States	Disqualified

=== 2011 ===
Film	Director(s)	Studio(s)	Production Country	Result
The Adventures of Tintin	Steven Spielberg	Nickelodeon Movies, Amblin Entertainment	United States; New Zealand	Not nominated
Alois Nebel	Tomáš Luňák	Negativ	Czech Republic; Germany	Not nominated
Alvin and the Chipmunks: Chipwrecked	Mike Mitchell	Regency Enterprises, Bagdasarian Company	United States	Not nominated
Arthur Christmas	Sarah Smith	Aardman Animations, Sony Pictures Animation	United Kingdom; United States	Not nominated
Cars 2	John Lasseter	Pixar Animation Studios	United States	Not nominated
A Cat in Paris	Jean-Loup Felicioli and Alain Gagnol	Digit Anima, Folimage, France 3 Cinéma, Emage Animation Studios	France; Netherlands; Switzerland; Belgium	Nominated
Chico & Rita	Fernando Trueba, Javier Mariscal and Tono Errando	Fernando Trueba PC, Estudio Mariscal, Magic Light Pictures	Spain	Nominated
Gnomeo & Juliet	Kelly Asbury	Touchstone Pictures, Rocket Pictures	United Kingdom; United States	Not nominated
Happy Feet Two	George Miller	Village Roadshow Pictures, Kennedy Miller Mitchell, Dr. D Studios	Australia; United States	Not nominated
Hoodwinked Too! Hood vs. Evil	Mike Disa	Kanbar Entertainment, Kanbar Animation, Arc Productions	United States	Not nominated
Kung Fu Panda 2	Jennifer Yuh Nelson	DreamWorks Animation	United States	Nominated
Mars Needs Moms	Simon Wells	ImageMovers Digital	United States	Not nominated
Puss in Boots	Chris Miller	DreamWorks Animation	United States	Nominated
Rango	Gore Verbinski	Nickelodeon Movies, Blind Wink Productions, GK Films, Industrial Light & Magic	United States	Won Academy Award
Rio	Carlos Saldanha	Blue Sky Studios	United States	Not nominated
~~The Smurfs~~ (Note: The Smurfs was disqualified for not meeting the requirements of the rules, which required 75% of the entire film to be animated)	~~Raja Gosnell~~	~~Sony Pictures Animation~~, ~~Kerner Entertainment Company~~	United States	Disqualified
Winnie the Pooh	Stephen Anderson and Don Hall	Walt Disney Animation Studios	United States	Not nominated
Wrinkles	Ignacio Ferreras	Perro Verde Films	Spain	Not nominated

=== 2012 ===
Film	Director(s)	Studio(s)	Production Country	Result
Adventures in Zambezia	Wayne Thornley	Triggerfish Animation Studios	South Africa	Not nominated
Brave	Mark Andrews and Brenda Chapman	Pixar Animation Studios	United States	Won Academy Award
Delhi Safari	Nikkhil Advani	Krayon Pictures	India	Not nominated
Dr. Seuss' The Lorax	Chris Renaud and Kyle Balda	Illumination Entertainment	United States	Not nominated
Frankenweenie	Tim Burton	Tim Burton Productions	United States	Nominated
From Up on Poppy Hill	Goro Miyazaki	Studio Ghibli	Japan	Not nominated
Hey Krishna	Vikram Veturi	Reliance Entertainment	India	Not nominated
Hotel Transylvania	Genndy Tartakovsky	Sony Pictures Animation	United States	Not nominated
Ice Age: Continental Drift	Steve Martino and Michael Thurmeier	Blue Sky Studios	United States	Not nominated
A Liar's Autobiography: The Untrue Story of Monty Python's Graham Chapman	Bill Jones, Jeff Simpson and Ben Timlett	Bill and Ben Productions	United Kingdom	Not nominated
Madagascar 3: Europe's Most Wanted	Eric Darnell, Tom McGrath, and Conrad Vernon	DreamWorks Animation	United States	Not nominated
The Mystical Laws	Isamu Imakake	Happy Science	Japan	Not nominated
The Painting	Jean-François Laguionie	Blue Spirit, Be-Films	France; Belgium	Not nominated
ParaNorman	Sam Fell and Chris Butler	Laika	United States	Nominated
The Pirates! Band of Misfits	Peter Lord	Aardman Animations, Sony Pictures Animation	United Kingdom; United States	Nominated
The Rabbi's Cat	Joann Sfar and Antoine Delesvaux	Autochenille Production	France	Not nominated
Rise of the Guardians	Peter Ramsey	DreamWorks Animation	United States	Not nominated
Secret of the Wings	Peggy Holmes	Disneytoon Studios	United States	Not nominated
Walter & Tandoori's Christmas	Sylvain Viau	Image Entertainment Corporation	Canada	Not nominated
Wreck-It Ralph	Rich Moore	Walt Disney Animation Studios	United States	Nominated
Zarafa	Rémi Bezançon and Jean-Christophe Lie	Pathé, Prima Linea Productions, France 3 Cinéma	France	Not nominated

=== 2013 ===
Film	Director(s)	Studio(s)	Production Country	Result
Cloudy with a Chance of Meatballs 2	Cody Cameron and Kris Pearn	Sony Pictures Animation	United States	Not nominated
The Croods	Kirk DeMicco and Chris Sanders	DreamWorks Animation	United States	Nominated
Despicable Me 2	Pierre Coffin and Chris Renaud	Illumination Entertainment	United States	Nominated
Epic	Chris Wedge	Blue Sky Studios	United States	Not nominated
Ernest & Celestine	Stéphane Aubier, Vincent Patar and Benjamin Renner	La Parti Productions, Les Armateurs	France	Nominated
The Fake	Yeon Sang-ho	Studio Dada Show	South Korea	Not nominated
Free Birds	Jimmy Hayward	Reel FX Creative Studios	United States	Not nominated
Frozen	Chris Buck and Jennifer Lee	Walt Disney Animation Studios	United States	Won Academy Award
Khumba	Anthony Silverston	Triggerfish Animation Studios	South Africa	Not nominated
The Legend of Sarila	Nancy Florence Savard	10th Ave Productions	Canada	Not nominated
A Letter to Momo	Hiroyuki Okiura	Production I.G	Japan	Not nominated
Monsters University	Dan Scanlon	Pixar Animation Studios	United States	Not nominated
O Apóstolo	Fernando Cortizo	Rosp Coruña	Spain	Not nominated
Planes	Klay Hall	Disneytoon Studios	United States	Not nominated
Puella Magi Madoka Magica: The Movie: Rebellion	Akiyuki Shinbo and Yukihiro Miyamoto	Shaft	Japan	Not nominated
Rio 2096: A Story of Love and Fury	Luiz Bolognesi	Buriti Filmes, Gullane	Brazil	Not nominated
The Smurfs 2	Raja Gosnell	Sony Pictures Animation, Kerner Entertainment Company	United States	Not nominated
Turbo	David Soren	DreamWorks Animation	United States	Not nominated
The Wind Rises	Hayao Miyazaki	Studio Ghibli	Japan	Nominated

=== 2014 ===
Film	Director(s)	Studio(s)	Production Country	Result
Big Hero 6	Don Hall and Chris Williams	Walt Disney Animation Studios	United States	Won Academy Award
The Book of Life	Jorge R. Gutierrez	Reel FX Creative Studios	United States	Not nominated
The Boxtrolls	Graham Annable and Anthony Stacchi	Laika	United States	Nominated
Cheatin'	Bill Plympton	Plymptoons Studio	United States	Not nominated
Giovanni's Island	Mizuho Nishikubo	Production I.G	Japan	Not nominated
Henry & Me	Barrett Esposito	Reveal Animation Studios	United States	Not nominated
The Hero of Color City	Frank Gladstone	Exodus Film Group	United States	Not nominated
How to Train Your Dragon 2	Dean DeBlois	DreamWorks Animation	United States	Nominated
Jack and the Cuckoo-Clock Heart	Stéphane Berla and Mathias Malzieu	Duran, EuropaCorp, France 3 Cinéma	France	Not nominated
Legends of Oz: Dorothy's Return	Will Finn and Dan St. Pierre	Prana Studios	United States; India	Not nominated
The Lego Movie	Phil Lord and Christopher Miller	Warner Animation Group, Animal Logic	United States	Not nominated
Minuscule: Valley of the Lost Ants	Hélène Giraud and Thomas Szabo	Futurikon	France; Belgium	Not nominated
Mr. Peabody & Sherman	Rob Minkoff	DreamWorks Animation	United States	Not nominated
Penguins of Madagascar	Eric Darnell and Simon J. Smith	DreamWorks Animation	United States	Not nominated
The Pirate Fairy	Peggy Holmes	Disneytoon Studios	United States	Not nominated
Planes: Fire & Rescue	Roberts Gannaway	Disneytoon Studios	United States	Not nominated
Rio 2	Carlos Saldanha	Blue Sky Studios	United States	Not nominated
Rocks in My Pockets	Signe Baumane	Locomotive Productions	Latvia	Not nominated
Song of the Sea	Tomm Moore	Cartoon Saloon	Ireland	Nominated
The Tale of the Princess Kaguya	Isao Takahata	Studio Ghibli	Japan	Nominated

=== 2015 ===
Film	Director(s)	Studio(s)	Production Country	Result	Ref.
Anomalisa	Charlie Kaufman and Duke Johnson	HanWay Films, Starburns Industries, Snoot Films	United States	Nominated	
The Boy and the Beast	Mamoru Hosoda	Studio Chizu	Japan	Not nominated	
Boy and the World	Alê Abreu	Filme de Papel	Brazil	Nominated	
The Good Dinosaur	Peter Sohn	Pixar Animation Studios	United States	Not nominated	
Home	Tim Johnson	DreamWorks Animation	United States	Not nominated	
Hotel Transylvania 2	Genndy Tartakovsky	Sony Pictures Animation	United States	Not nominated	
Inside Out	Pete Docter	Pixar Animation Studios	United States	Won Academy Award	
Kahlil Gibran's The Prophet	Roger Allers	Ventanarosa	Canada; France; United States	Not nominated	
The Laws of the Universe: Part 0	Isamu Imakake	HS Pictures Studio	Japan	Not nominated	
Minions	Pierre Coffin; Kyle Balda	Illumination	United States	Not nominated	
Moomins on the Riviera	Xavier Picard	Handle Productions, Pictak Cie, Moomin Characters	Finland; France	Not nominated	
The Peanuts Movie	Steve Martino	Blue Sky Studios	United States	Not nominated	
Regular Show: The Movie	J. G. Quintel	Cartoon Network Studios	United States	Not nominated	
Shaun the Sheep Movie	Mark Burton; Richard Starzak	Aardman Animations	United Kingdom	Nominated	
The SpongeBob Movie: Sponge Out of Water	Paul Tibbitt	Nickelodeon Movies, United Plankton Pictures	United States	Not nominated	
When Marnie Was There	Hiromasa Yonebayashi	Studio Ghibli	Japan	Nominated	

=== 2016 ===
Film	Director(s)	Studio(s)	Production Country	Result
The Angry Birds Movie	Clay Kaytis and Fergal Reilly	Rovio Animation	United States; Finland	Not nominated
April and the Extraordinary World	Christian Desmares and Franck Ekinci	StudioCanal	France; Belgium; Canada	Not nominated
Bilal: A New Breed of Hero	Khurram H. Alavi and Ayman Jamal	Barajoun Entertainment	United Arab Emirates	Not nominated
Finding Dory	Andrew Stanton	Pixar Animation Studios	United States	Not nominated
Ice Age: Collision Course	Mike Thurmeier	Blue Sky Studios	United States	Not nominated
Kingsglaive: Final Fantasy XV	Takeshi Nozue	Visual Works, Digic Pictures, Image Engine	Japan	Not nominated
Kubo and the Two Strings	Travis Knight	Laika	United States	Nominated
Kung Fu Panda 3	Jennifer Yuh Nelson and Alessandro Carloni	DreamWorks Animation	United States	Not nominated
The Little Prince	Mark Osborne	On Animation Studios, Orange Studio, LPPTV, M6 Films	France	Not nominated
Long Way North	Rémi Chayé	Sacrebleu Productions, Maybe Movies, France 3 Cinéma, 2 Minutes, Nørlum	France; Denmark	Not nominated
Miss Hokusai	Keiichi Hara	Production I.G	Japan	Not nominated
Moana	Ron Clements and John Musker	Walt Disney Animation Studios	United States	Nominated
Monkey King: Hero Is Back	Tian Xiaopeng	Beijing Weiyingshidai Culture & Media, Hengdian Chinese Film Production Co., October Animation Studio. S&C Pictures	China	Not nominated
Mune: Guardian of the Moon	Alexandre Heboyan and Benoît Philippon	On Animation Studios, Onyx Films, Kinology, Orange Studio	France	Not nominated
Mustafa and the Magician	V. Chandrasekaran	Pentamedia	India	Not nominated
My Life as a Zucchini	Claude Barras	Rita Productions, Blue Spirit Productions, Gebeka Films, KNM	Switzerland; France	Nominated
Phantom Boy	Jean-Loup Felicioli and Alain Gagnol	Folimage, Lunanime, France 3 Cinema, Rhone-Alpes Cinema	France; Belgium	Not nominated
The Red Turtle	Michaël Dudok de Wit	Wild Bunch, Studio Ghibli	France; Japan	Nominated
Rock Dog	Ash Brannon	Huayi Brothers, Reel FX Creative Studios	United States; China	Not nominated
Sausage Party	Conrad Vernon and Greg Tiernan	Annapurna Pictures, Point Grey Pictures, Nitrogen Studios	United States	Not nominated
The Secret Life of Pets	Chris Renaud	Illumination Entertainment	United States	Not nominated
Sing	Garth Jennings	Illumination Entertainment	United States	Not nominated
Snowtime!	Jean-François Pouliot	CarpeDiem Film & TV, Singing Frog Studio	Canada	Not nominated
Storks	Nicholas Stoller and Doug Sweetland	Warner Animation Group	United States	Not nominated
Trolls	Mike Mitchell	DreamWorks Animation	United States	Not nominated
25 April	Leanne Pooley	Unknown	New Zealand	Not nominated
Your Name	Makoto Shinkai	CoMix Wave Films	Japan	Not nominated
Zootopia	Byron Howard and Rich Moore	Walt Disney Animation Studios	United States	Won Academy Award

=== 2017 ===
Film	Director(s)	Studio(s)	Country	Result
The Big Bad Fox and Other Tales...	Benjamin Renner and Patrick Imbert	Folivari, Panique! Production	France; Belgium	Not nominated
Birdboy: The Forgotten Children	Alberto Vázquez and Pedro Rivero	ZircoZine, Basque Films, Abrakam Estudio, La Competencia Producciones, Studio 4°C	Spain	Not nominated
The Boss Baby	Tom McGrath	DreamWorks Animation	United States	Nominated
The Breadwinner	Nora Twomey	Cartoon Saloon	Canada; Ireland; Luxembourg	Nominated
Captain Underpants: The First Epic Movie	David Soren	DreamWorks Animation	United States	Not nominated
Cars 3	Brian Fee	Pixar Animation Studios	United States	Not nominated
Cinderella the Cat	Alessandro Rak, Ivan Cappiello, Marino Guarnieri and Dario Sansone	Rai Cinema	Italy	Not nominated
Coco	Lee Unkrich	Pixar Animation Studios	United States	Won Academy Award
Despicable Me 3	Pierre Coffin and Kyle Balda	Illumination	United States	Not nominated
The Emoji Movie	Tony Leondis	Sony Pictures Animation	United States	Not nominated
Ethel & Ernest	Roger Mainwood	Lupus Films, Cloth Cat Animation	United Kingdom	Not nominated
Ferdinand	Carlos Saldanha	Blue Sky Studios	United States	Nominated
The Girl Without Hands	Sébastien Laudenbach	Les Films Sauvages, Les Films Pelléas	France	Not nominated
In This Corner of the World	Sunao Katabuchi	MAPPA	Japan	Not nominated
The Lego Batman Movie	Chris McKay	Warner Animation Group	United States	Not nominated
The Lego Ninjago Movie	Charlie Bean, Paul Fisher and Bob Logan	Warner Animation Group	United States	Not nominated
Loving Vincent	Dorota Kobiela and Hugh Welchman	BreakThru Productions; Trademark Films	Poland; United Kingdom; United States	Nominated
Mary and the Witch's Flower	Hiromasa Yonebayashi	Studio Ponoc	Japan	Not nominated
Moomins and the Winter Wonderland	Ira Carpelan and Jakub Wronski	Oy Filmkompaniet Alpha Ab; Animoon	Finland; Poland	Not nominated
My Entire High School Sinking into the Sea	Dash Shaw	Washington Square Films, Electric Chinoland, Low Spark Films	United States	Not nominated
Napping Princess	Kenji Kamiyama	Signal.MD	Japan	Not nominated
A Silent Voice	Naoko Yamada	Kyoto Animation	Japan	Not nominated
Smurfs: The Lost Village	Kelly Asbury	Sony Pictures Animation, The Kerner Entertainment Company	United States	Not nominated
The Star	Timothy Reckart	Sony Pictures Animation, Walden Media, The Jim Henson Company	United States	Not nominated
Sword Art Online The Movie: Ordinal Scale	Tomohiko Itō	A-1 Pictures	Japan	Not nominated
Window Horses: The Poetic Persian Epiphany of Rosie Ming	Ann Marie Fleming	Stickgirl Productions	Canada	Not nominated

=== 2018 ===
Film	Director(s)	Studio(s)	Production Country	Result
Ana y Bruno	Carlos Carrera	Discreet Arts Productions	Mexico	Not nominated
Dr. Seuss' The Grinch	Scott Mosier and Yarrow Cheney	Illumination	United States	Not nominated
Early Man	Nick Park	Aardman Animations	United Kingdom	Not nominated
Fireworks	Akiyuki Shinbō	Shaft	Japan	Not nominated
Have a Nice Day	Liu Jian	Nezha Bros. Pictures, Le-joy Animation Studio	China	Not nominated
Hotel Transylvania 3: Summer Vacation	Genndy Tartakovsky	Sony Pictures Animation	United States	Not nominated
Incredibles 2	Brad Bird	Pixar Animation Studios	United States	Nominated
Isle of Dogs	Wes Anderson	Indian Paintbrush, American Empirical Pictures	United States	Nominated
The Laws of the Universe: Part 1	Isamu Imakake	HS Pictures Studio	Japan	Not nominated
Liz and the Blue Bird	Naoko Yamada	Kyoto Animation	Japan	Not nominated
Lu Over the Wall	Masaaki Yuasa	Science Saru	Japan	Not nominated
MFKZ	Shōjirō Nishimi and Guillaume "Run" Renard	Ankama Animations, Studio 4°C	France; Japan	Not nominated
Maquia: When the Promised Flower Blooms	Mari Okada	P.A. Works	Japan	Not nominated
Mirai	Mamoru Hosoda	Studio Chizu	Japan	Nominated
The Night Is Short, Walk on Girl	Masaaki Yuasa	Science Saru	Japan	Not nominated
On Happiness Road	Hsin Yin Sung	Ifilm	Taiwan	Not nominated
Ralph Breaks the Internet	Rich Moore and Phil Johnston	Walt Disney Animation Studios	United States	Nominated
Ruben Brandt, Collector	Milorad Krstić	Mozinet	Hungary	Not nominated
Sgt. Stubby: An American Hero	Richard Lanni	Fun Academy Motion Pictures, Mikros Image	United States	Not nominated
Sherlock Gnomes	John Stevenson	Paramount Animation, Metro-Goldwyn-Mayer, Rocket Pictures	United Kingdom; United States	Not nominated
Smallfoot	Karey Kirkpatrick	Warner Animation Group	United States	Not nominated
Spider-Man: Into the Spider-Verse	Bob Persichetti, Peter Ramsey, and Rodney Rothman	Sony Pictures Animation, Marvel Entertainment, Pascal Pictures	United States	Won Academy Award
Tall Tales	Antoon Krings and Arnaud Bouron	France 3, Onyx Films	France	Not nominated
Teen Titans Go! To The Movies	Peter Rida Michail and Aaron Horvath	Warner Bros. Animation, DC Entertainment	United States	Not nominated
Tito and the Birds	Gustavo Steinberg, André Catoto and Gabriel Bitar	Bits Produções	Brazil	Not nominated

=== 2019 ===
Film	Director(s)	Studio(s)	Production Country	Result	Ref.
Abominable	Jill Culton	DreamWorks Animation, Pearl Studio	United States; China	Not nominated	
The Addams Family	Conrad Vernon and Greg Tiernan	Cinesite Studios, Nitrogen Studios	United States	Not nominated	
The Angry Birds Movie 2	Thurop Van Orman	Rovio Animation, Sony Pictures Animation	Finland; United States	Not nominated	
Another Day of Life	Raúl de la Fuente and Damian Nenow	Platige Image	Poland; Spain; Belgium; Germany; Hungary	Not nominated	
Away	Gints Zilbalodis	Bilibaba	Latvia	Not nominated	
Buñuel in the Labyrinth of the Turtles	Salvador Simó Busom	Sygnatia	Spain	Not nominated	
Children of the Sea	Ayumu Watanabe	Studio 4 °C	Japan	Not nominated	
Dilili in Paris	Michel Ocelot	Wild Bunch, Mac Guff	France; Germany; Belgium	Not nominated	
Frozen II	Chris Buck and Jennifer Lee	Walt Disney Animation Studios	United States	Not nominated	
Funan	Denis Do	Bac Films	France; Luxembourg; Belgium	Not nominated	
Genndy Tartakovsky’s ‘Primal’ – Tales of Savagery	Genndy Tartakovsky	Cartoon Network Studios, Williams Street	United States	Not nominated	
How to Train Your Dragon: The Hidden World	Dean DeBlois	DreamWorks Animation	United States	Nominated	
I Lost My Body	Jérémy Clapin	Xilam	France	Nominated	
Klaus	Sergio Pablos	Sergio Pablos Animation Studios, Atresmedia Cine, Aniventure	Spain	Nominated	
The Last Fiction	Ashkan Rahgozar	Hoorakhsh Studio	Iran	Not nominated	
The Lego Movie 2: The Second Part	Mike Mitchell	Warner Animation Group, Lego System A/S, Animal Logic	United States	Not nominated	
Marona's Fantastic Tale	Anca Damian	Aparte Film	France; Romania; Belgium	Not nominated	
Missing Link	Chris Butler	Annapurna Pictures, Laika	United States	Nominated	
Ne Zha	Jiaozi	Chengdu Coco Cartoon	China	Not nominated	
Okko's Inn	Kitaro Kosaka	DLE, Madhouse	Japan	Not nominated	
Pachamama	Juan Antin	Folivari, O2B Films, Doghouse Films	France; Luxembourg; Canada	Not nominated	
Promare	Hiroyuki Imaishi	Trigger, XFLAG, Sanzigen	Japan	Not nominated	
Rezo	Levan Gabriadze	Bazelevs Production	Russia	Not nominated	
The Secret Life of Pets 2	Chris Renaud	Illumination	United States	Not nominated	
Spies in Disguise	Nick Bruno; Troy Quane	Blue Sky Studios	United States	Not nominated	
The Swallows of Kabul	Zabou Breitman; Eléa Gobé Mévellec	Les Armateurs	France	Not nominated	
This Magnificent Cake! (Ce magnifique gâteau !)	Emma De Swaef and Marc James Roels	Beast Animation, Vivement Lundi, Pedri Animation	Belgium; France; Netherlands	Not nominated	
The Tower	Mats Grorud	Tenk.tv, Les Contes Modernes, Cinenic Film	Norway	Not nominated	
Toy Story 4	Josh Cooley	Pixar Animation Studios	United States	Won Academy Award	
Upin & Ipin: The Lone Gibbon Kris	Adam B Amiruddin; Syed Nurfaiz Khalid B Syed Ibrahim; Ahmad Razuri B Roseli	Les' Copaque Production	Malaysia	Not nominated	
Weathering With You	Makoto Shinkai	CoMix Wave Films, Story Inc.	Japan	Not nominated	
White Snake	Amp Wong; Zhao Ji	Light Chaser Animation	China	Not nominated	

== 2020s ==
=== 2020 ===
Film	Director(s)	Studio(s)	Production Country	Result	Ref.
Accidental Luxuriance of the Translucent Watery Rebus	Dalibor Barić	Kaos	Croatia	Not nominated	
Bombay Rose	Gitanjali Rao	Cinestaan Film Company, Netflix	India	Not nominated	
Calamity, a Childhood of Martha Jane Cannary	Rémi Chayé	Maybe Movies, vNoerlum Studios	France; Denmark	Not nominated	
The Croods: A New Age	Joel Crawford	DreamWorks Animation	United States	Not nominated	
Demon Slayer: Kimetsu no Yaiba the Movie: Mugen Train	Haruo Sotozaki	Ufotable, Toho, Aniplex	Japan	Not nominated	
Dreambuilders	Kim Hagen Jensen	First Lady Film	Denmark	Not nominated	
Earwig and the Witch	Gorō Miyazaki	Studio Ghibli, NHK Enterprises	Japan	Not nominated	
Kill It and Leave This Town	Mariusz Wilczynski	Bombonierka	Poland	Not nominated	
Lupin III: The First	Takashi Yamazaki	TMS Entertainment, Marza Animation Planet, Toho	Japan	Not nominated	
Mosley	Kirby Atkins	Huhu Studios, China Film Animation	New Zealand	Not nominated	
My Favorite War	Ilze Burkovska Jacobsen	Bivrost Film, Ego Media	Latvia; Norway	Not nominated	
The Nose or the Conspiracy of Mavericks	Andrei Khrzhanovsky	School-Studio "Shar"	Russia	Not nominated	
No.7 Cherry Lane	Yonfan	Far Sun Film Co. Ltd.	Hong Kong; China	Not nominated	
On-Gaku: Our Sound	Kenji Iwaisawa	Rock’n Roll Mountain; Tip Top	Japan	Not nominated	
Onward	Dan Scanlon	Pixar Animation Studios	United States	Nominated	
Over the Moon	Glen Keane	Netflix Animation, Pearl Studio, Sony Pictures Imageworks, Glen Keane Productions	United States; China	Nominated	
Red Shoes and the Seven Dwarfs	Sung-ho Hong	Locus Corporation	South Korea	Not nominated	
Ride Your Wave	Masaaki Yuasa	Science Saru, Toho	Japan	Not nominated	
Scoob!	Tony Cervone	Warner Animation Group, Atlas Entertainment, 1492 Pictures	United States	Not nominated	
A Shaun the Sheep Movie: Farmageddon	Richard Phelan and Will Becher	Aardman Animations, Creative Europe MEDIA, Anton Capital Entertainment	United Kingdom	Nominated	
Soul	Pete Docter	Pixar Animation Studios	United States	Won Academy Award	
~~The SpongeBob Movie: Sponge on the Run~~ (Note: The SpongeBob Movie: Sponge on the Run was withdrawn by the distributor for not meeting the requirements of the rules, which required the film to complete qualification runs, whether in a theater, drive-in, streaming service or on VOD.)	~~Tim Hill~~	~~Paramount Animation~~, ~~Nickelodeon Movies~~, ~~United Plankton Pictures~~, ~~MRC~~	United States	Withdrawn	
Terra Willy	Éric Tosti	TAT Productions	France	Not nominated	
Trolls World Tour	Walt Dohrn	DreamWorks Animation	United States	Not nominated	
A Whisker Away	Junichi Sato andTomotaka Shibayama	Studio Colorido, Toho Animation, Twin Engine	Japan	Not nominated	
The Willoughbys	Kris Pearn	Netflix Animation, Bron Animation, Creative Wealth Media	Canada; United States	Not nominated	
Wolfwalkers	Tomm Moore; Ross Stewart	Cartoon Saloon, Mélusine	Ireland; Luxembourg; United Kingdom; France	Nominated	

=== 2021 ===
Film	Director(s)	Studio(s)	Production Country	Result	Ref.
The Addams Family 2	Greg Tiernan and Conrad Vernon	Metro-Goldwyn-Mayer, Bron Creative, Cinesite Studios; Nitrogen Studios, The Jackal Group, Glickmania	United States	Not nominated	
The Ape Star	Linda Hambäck	Lee Film	Sweden; Norway; Denmark	Not nominated	
Back to the Outback	Clare Knight and Harry Cripps	Netflix Animation, Reel FX Animation Studios, Weed Road Pictures	Australia; United States	Not nominated	
Belle	Mamoru Hosoda	Studio Chizu	Japan	Not nominated	
Bob Spit – We Do Not Like People	Cesar Cabral	Coala Filmes	Brazil	Not nominated	
The Boss Baby: Family Business	Tom McGrath	DreamWorks Animation	United States	Not nominated	
Cryptozoo	Dash Shaw	Fit Via Fi, Electro Chinoland, Washington Square Films, Low Spark Films, Cinereach	United States	Not nominated	
Encanto	Byron Howard and Jared Bush	Walt Disney Animation Studios	United States	Won Academy Award	
Flee	Jonas Poher Rasmussen	Vice Studios, Sun Creature Studio, Danish Film Institute	Denmark; Norway; Sweden; France; United Kingdom; United States	Nominated	
Fortune Favors Lady Nikuko	Ayumu Watanabe	Studio 4°C	Japan	Not nominated	
Josee, the Tiger and the Fish	Kotaro Tamura	Bones	Japan	Not nominated	
The Laws of the Universe – The Age of Elohim	Isamu Imakake	HS Pictures Studio	Japan	Not nominated	
Luca	Enrico Casarosa	Pixar Animation Studios	United States	Nominated	
The Mitchells vs. the Machines	Mike Rianda	Columbia Pictures, Sony Pictures Animation, Lord Miller Productions, One Cool Films	United States	Nominated	
My Sunny Maad	Michaela Pavlátová	Negativ Film; Sacrebleu Productions	Czech Republic; France; Slovakia	Not nominated	
PAW Patrol: The Movie	Cal Brunker	Spin Master Entertainment, Mikros Image, Nickelodeon Movies	Canada; United States	Not nominated	
Pompo: The Cinéphile	Takayuki Hirao	Kadokawa Productions	Japan	Not nominated	
Poupelle of Chimney Town	Yusuke Hirota	Studio 4°C, Yoshimoto Kogyo Company	Japan	Not nominated	
Raya and the Last Dragon	Don Hall and Carlos López Estrada	Walt Disney Animation Studios	United States	Nominated	
Ron's Gone Wrong	Sarah Smith and Jean-Philippe Vine	DNEG, Locksmith Animation, 20th Century Animation	United Kingdom; United States	Not nominated	
Sing 2	Garth Jennings	Illumination	United States	Not nominated	
The Spine of Night	Philip Gelatt; Morgan Galen King	Gorgonaut, Reno Productions	United States	Not nominated	
Spirit Untamed	Elaine Bogan	DreamWorks Animation	United States	Not nominated	
The Summit of the Gods	Patrick Imbert	Folivari, Mélusine Productions	France; Luxembourg	Not nominated	
Vivo	Kirk DeMicco	Columbia Pictures, Sony Pictures Animation, One Cool Films, Laurence Mark Productions	United States	Not nominated	
Wish Dragon	Chris Appelhans	Columbia Pictures, Sony Pictures Animation, Beijing Sparkle Roll Media Corporation; Tencent Pictures, Base FX	China; United States	Not nominated	

=== 2022 ===
Film	Director(s)	Studio(s)	Production Country	Result	Ref.
Apollo 10 1/2: A Space Age Childhood	Richard Linklater	Netflix Animation, Minnow Mountain, Submarine, Detour Filmproduction	United States	Not nominated	
The Bad Guys	Pierre Perifel	DreamWorks Animation	United States	Not nominated	
The Bob's Burgers Movie	Loren Bouchard and Bernard Derriman	20th Century Animation, 20th Century Family, Bento Box Entertainment, Wilo Productions	United States	Not nominated	
Charlotte	Éric Warin and Tahir Rana	January Films, Sons of Manual, Les Productions Balthazar, Walking the Dog	Canada; France; Belgium	Not nominated	
DC League of Super-Pets	Jared Stern	Warner Animation Group, DC Entertainment, Seven Bucks Productions	United States	Not nominated	
Drifting Home	Hiroyasu Ishida	Studio Colorido	Japan	Not nominated	
Eternal Spring	Jason Loftus	Lofty Sky Entertainment	Canada	Not nominated	
Goodbye, Don Glees!	Atsuko Ishizuka	Madhouse	Japan	Not nominated	
Guillermo del Toro's Pinocchio	Guillermo del Toro and Mark Gustafson	Netflix Animation, The Jim Henson Company, Pathé, ShadowMachine, Double Dare You! Productions; Necropia Entertainment	United States; Mexico	Won Academy Award	
Inu-Oh	Masaaki Yuasa	Science SARU	Japan	Not nominated	
Lamya's Poem	Alex Kronemer	Unity Productions; PiP Animation Services	United States; Canada	Not nominated	
Lightyear	Angus MacLane	Pixar Animation Studios	United States	Not nominated	
Little Nicholas, Happy As Can Be	Amandine Fredon and Benjamin Massoubre	On Classics	France	Not nominated	
Luck	Peggy Holmes	Skydance Animation	United States	Not nominated	
Mad God	Phil Tippett	Tippett Studio	United States	Not nominated	
Marcel the Shell with Shoes On	Dean Fleisher Camp	Cinereach, You Want I Should LLC., Human Woman Inc., Sunbeam TV & Films; Chiodo Bros. Productions	United States	Nominated	
Minions: The Rise of Gru	Kyle Balda	Illumination	United States	Not nominated	
My Father’s Dragon	Nora Twomey	Cartoon Saloon, Mockingbird Pictures	Ireland; United States	Not nominated	
New Gods: Yang Jian	Ji Zhao	Light Chaser Animation Studios, Zhejiang Dongyang, Xiaoyuzhou Movie & Media	China	Not nominated	
Oink	Mascha Halberstad	Viking Film	Netherlands	Not nominated	
Paws of Fury: The Legend of Hank	Rob Minkoff; Mark Koetsier; Chris Bailey	Nickelodeon Movies, Align; Aniventure, HB Wink Animation, GFM Animation, Flying Tigers Entertainment, Cinesite, Brooksfilms	United States	Not nominated	
Puss in Boots: The Last Wish	Joel Crawford	DreamWorks Animation	United States	Nominated	
Run, Tiger Run!	Stanley Tsang; Joey Zou	Beijing Xinxi Pictures	China	Not nominated	
The Sea Beast	Chris Williams	Netflix Animation	United States	Nominated	
Strange World	Don Hall	Walt Disney Animation Studios	United States	Not nominated	
Turning Red	Domee Shi	Pixar Animation Studios	United States	Nominated	
Wendell and Wild	Henry Selick	Monkeypaw Productions, Gotham Group	United States	Not nominated	

=== 2023 ===
Film	Director(s)	Studio(s)	Production Country	Result	Ref.
The Amazing Maurice	Toby Genkel	Ulysses Filmproduktion, Cantilever Media, Narrativian Moonshot Films	United Kingdom; Germany	Not nominated	
Blue Giant	Yuzuru Tachikawa	NUT	Japan	Not nominated	
The Boy and the Heron	Hayao Miyazaki	Studio Ghibli	Japan	Won Academy Award	
Chang'an	Xie Junwei and Zou Jing	Light Chaser Animation Studios	China	Not nominated	
Chicken Run: Dawn of the Nugget	Sam Fell	Aardman Animations	United Kingdom	Not nominated	
Deep Sea	Tian Xiaopeng	October Media	China	Not nominated	
Elemental	Peter Sohn	Pixar Animation Studios	United States	Nominated	
Ernest & Celestine: A Trip to Gibberitia	Julien Chheng, Jean-Christophe Roger	La Parti Productions, Les Armateurs	France	Not nominated	
The First Slam Dunk	Takehiko Inoue	Toei Animation	Japan	Not nominated	
The Inventor	Jim Capobianco	Curiosity Studio	United States	Not nominated	
Leo	Robert Marianetti, David Wachtenheim and Robert Smigel	Netflix Animation, Happy Madison Productions	United States	Not nominated	
Lonely Castle in the Mirror	Keiichi Hara	A-1 Pictures	Japan	Not nominated	
The Magician's Elephant	Wendy Rogers	Netflix Animation	United States	Not nominated	
Migration	Benjamin Renner	Illumination	United States	Not nominated	
Ladybug & Cat Noir: The Movie	Jeremy Zag	The Awakening Production; SND	France	Not nominated	
The Monkey King	Anthony Stacchi	Netflix Animation, Reel FX Animation	United States	Not nominated	
My Love Affair with Marriage	Signe Baumane	Studio Locomotive	Latvia; United States; Luxembourg	Not nominated	
Nimona	Nick Bruno and Troy Quane	Annapurna Animation	United States	Nominated	
PAW Patrol: The Mighty Movie	Cal Brunker	Nickelodeon Movies, Spin Master Entertainment	Canada; United States	Not nominated	
The Peasants	Dorota Kobiela and Hugh Welchman	BreakThru Productions, Trademark Films	Poland; Serbia; Lithuania	Not nominated	
Perlimps	Alê Abreu	Globo Filmes, Buriti Filmes, Gloob	Brazil	Not nominated	
Robot Dreams	Pablo Berger	Arcadia Motion Pictures, Noodles Production, Les Films du Worso, RTVE, Movistar Plus+	Spain; France	Nominated	
Ruby Gillman, Teenage Kraken	Kirk DeMicco	DreamWorks Animation	United States	Not nominated	
Spider-Man: Across the Spider-Verse	Joaquim Dos Santos, Kemp Powers and Justin K. Thompson	Sony Pictures Animation	United States	Nominated	
The Super Mario Bros. Movie	Michael Jelenic and Aaron Horvath	Illumination, Nintendo	United States	Not nominated	
Suzume	Makoto Shinkai	CoMix Wave Films	Japan	Not nominated	
Teenage Mutant Ninja Turtles: Mutant Mayhem	Jeff Rowe	Nickelodeon Movies, Point Grey Pictures	United States	Not nominated	
They Shot the Piano Player	Fernando Trueba and Javier Mariscal	Fernando Trueba PC, Gao Shan Pictures, Les Films D’ici, Prima Linea, Submarine Animanostra	Spain; France; Netherlands; Portugal; Peru	Not nominated	
Titina	Kajsa Næss	Mikrofilm, Vivi Film	Norway; Belgium	Not nominated	
Trolls Band Together	Walt Dohrn	DreamWorks Animation	United States	Not nominated	
Unicorn Wars	Alberto Vázquez	Abano Producións, Uniko, Unicorn Wars AIE, Autour de Minuit, Schmuby Productions	Spain; France	Not nominated	
Warrior King	Lu Qi	Cineverse	China	Not nominated	
Wish	Chris Buck and Fawn Veerasunthorn	Walt Disney Animation Studios	United States	Not nominated	

=== 2024 ===
Film	Director(s)	Studio(s)	Production Country	Result	Ref.
Art College 1994	Liu Jian	China Academy Of Art’s School of Animation and Game	China	Not nominated	
Captain Avispa	Jean Gabriel Guerra and Jonnathan Melendez	Guerra Toons	Dominican Republic	Not nominated	
Chicken for Linda!	Chiara Malta and Sébastien Laudenbach	Miyu Productions	France	Not nominated	
The Colors Within	Naoko Yamada	Science Saru	Japan	Not nominated	
The Day the Earth Blew Up: A Looney Tunes Movie	Pete Browngardt	Warner Bros. Animation	United States	Not nominated	
Despicable Me 4	Chris Renaud	Illumination	United States	Not nominated	
Flow	Gints Zilbalodis	Dream Well Studio	Latvia; France; Belgium	Won Academy Award	
The Garfield Movie	Mark Dindal	DNEG Animation, Alcon Entertainment, Columbia Pictures	United States	Not nominated	
Ghost Cat Anzu	Yōko Kuno and Nobuhiro Yamashita	Shin-Ei Animation, Miyu Productions	Japan; France	Not nominated	
The Glassworker	Usman Riaz	Mano Animation Studios	Pakistan	Not nominated	
The Imaginary	Yoshiyuki Momose	Studio Ponoc	Japan	Not nominated	
Inside Out 2	Kelsey Mann	Pixar Animation Studios	United States	Nominated	
Kensuke’s Kingdom	Neil Boyle and Kirk Hendry	Lupus Films	United Kingdom; Luxembourg; France	Not nominated	
Kung Fu Panda 4	Mike Mitchell	DreamWorks Animation	United States	Not nominated	
Living Large	Kristina Dufková	Barletta, Czech Television, Novanima Productions, NOVINSKI	Czech Republic; France; Slovakia	Not nominated	
Look Back	Kiyotaka Oshiyama	Studio Durian	Japan	Not nominated	
The Lord of the Rings: The War of the Rohirrim	Kenji Kamiyama	Warner Bros. Animation, Sola Entertainment	United States; Japan	Not nominated	
Mars Express	Jérémie Périn	Everybody on Deck	France	Not nominated	
Memoir of a Snail	Adam Elliot	Arenamedia, Snails Pace Films	Australia	Nominated	
Moana 2	David Derrick Jr., Jason Hand and Dana Ledoux Miller	Walt Disney Animation Studios	United States	Not nominated	
Piece by Piece	Morgan Neville	The Lego Group	United States	Not nominated	
Rocket Club: Across the Cosmos	Steve Ball and Hailey Kathler	ICON Creative Studio	Canada	Not nominated	
Sirocco and the Kingdom of Winds	Benoît Chieux	Haut et Court	Belgium; France	Not nominated	
Spellbound	Vicky Jenson	Skydance Animation	United States	Not nominated	
Sultana’s Dream	Isabel Herguera	Sultana Films	Spain; Germany	Not nominated	
That Christmas	Simon Otto	Netflix Animation, Locksmith Animation, DNEG Animation	United Kingdom; United States	Not nominated	
Thelma the Unicorn	Jared and Jerusha Hess	Netflix Animation	United States	Not nominated	
Transformers One	Josh Cooley	Hasbro Entertainment, Paramount Animation	United States	Not nominated	
Ultraman: Rising	Shannon Tindle	Netflix Animation, Tsuburaya Productions	United States; Japan	Not nominated	
Wallace & Gromit: Vengeance Most Fowl	Nick Park and Merlin Crossingham	Aardman Animations	United Kingdom	Nominated	
The Wild Robot	Chris Sanders	DreamWorks Animation	United States	Nominated	

=== 2025 ===
Film	Director(s)	Studio(s)	Production Country	Result	Ref.
All Operators are Currently Unavailable	Dalibor Barić	Kaos	Switzerland; Croatia	Not nominated	
Arco	Ugo Bienvenu	Fit Via Vi Film Productions, MountainA, Remembers	France; United States	Nominated	
The Bad Guys 2	Pierre Perifel	Universal Pictures, DreamWorks Animation	United States	Not nominated	
Black Butterflies	David Baute	Ikiru Films, Tinglado Films, Anangu Grup, Tunche Films	Spain; Panama	Not nominated	
Boys Go to Jupiter	Julian Glander	Glanderco	United States	Not nominated	
Chainsaw Man – The Movie: Reze Arc	Tatsuya Yoshihara	MAPPA	Japan	Not nominated	
ChaO	Yasuhiro Aoki	Studio 4°C	Japan	Not nominated	
Colorful Stage! The Movie: A Miku Who Can't Sing	Hiroyuki Hata	P.A. Works	Japan	Not nominated	
David	Brent Dawes and Phil Cunningham	2521 Entertainment, Slingshot Productions, Sunrise Animation Studios, Angel Studios	United States	Not nominated	
Demon Slayer: Kimetsu no Yaiba – The Movie: Infinity Castle	Haruo Sotozaki	Ufotable, Aniplex, Toho, Crunchyroll	Japan	Not nominated	
Dog Man	Peter Hastings	Universal Pictures, DreamWorks Animation	United States	Not nominated	
Dog of God	Lauris Ābele and Raitis Ābele	Tritone Studio, Lumiere Lab	Latvia; United States	Not nominated	
Dragon Heart: Adventures Beyond This World	Isamu Imakake	HS Pictures Studio, IRH Press Co.	Japan	Not nominated	
Elio	Domee Shi, Adrian Molina and Madeline Sharafian	Disney, Pixar Animation Studios	United States	Nominated	
Endless Cookie	Seth Scriver and Peter Scriver	Scythia Films	Canada	Not nominated	
Fixed	Genndy Tartakovsky	Netflix Animation, Sony Pictures Animation	United States	Not nominated	
Gabby's Dollhouse: The Movie	Ryan Crego	Universal Pictures, DreamWorks Animation	United States	Not nominated	
In Your Dreams	Alex Woo and Erik Benson	Netflix Animation, Kuku Studios	United States	Not nominated	
KPop Demon Hunters	Maggie Kang and Chris Appelhans	Sony Pictures Animation	United States	Won Academy Award	
The Legend of Hei II	MTJJ and Gu Jie	HMCH	China	Not nominated	
Light of the World	John Schafer	Salvation Poem Project	United States	Not nominated	
Little Amélie or the Character of Rain	Maïlys Vallade and Liane-Cho Han	Ikki Films, Maybe Movies	France	Nominated	
Lost in Starlight	Han Ji-won	Netflix Animation, Climax Studio	South Korea	Not nominated	
A Magnificent Life	Sylvain Chomet	What The Prod, Mediawan, Bidibul Productions, Walking The Dog	France; Belgium; United States; Luxembourg	Not nominated	
Mahavatar Narsimha	Ashwin Kumar	Hombale Films, Kleem Productions	India	Not nominated	
Night of the Zoopocalypse	Rodrigo Perez-Castro, Ricardo Curtis	Copperheart Entertainment, Anton Capital Entertainment, Charades, UMedia, Mac Guff, IDL Films, House of Cool	Canada; France; Belgium	Not nominated	
Olivia & the Clouds	Tomás Pichardo Espaillat	Guasábara Cine, Historias de Bibi, Cine Chani	Dominican Republic	Not nominated	
100 Meters	Kenji Iwaisawa	Asmik Ace, GKIDS, NYAV Post	Japan	Not nominated	
Out of the Nest	Andrew Gordon, Andrew Gordon and Veerapatra Jinanavin	Base FX, Shellhut Entertainment	Thailand; China	Not nominated	
Scarlet	Mamoru Hosoda	Studio Chizu	Japan	Not nominated	
Slide	Bill Plympton	Plymptoons	France; United States	Not nominated	
The SpongeBob Movie: Search for SquarePants	Derek Drymon	Paramount Animation, Nickelodeon Movies, United Plankton Pictures	United States	Not nominated	
Stitch Head	Steve Hudson and Toby Genkel	Gringo Films, Aniventure, Assemblage Entertainment, Fabrique d'Images, Traumhaus Studios	Germany; Luxembourg; France; United Kingdom; India	Not nominated	
The Twits	Phil Johnston	Netflix Animation, Jellyfish Pictures	United States	Not nominated	
Zootopia 2	Jared Bush and Byron Howard	Walt Disney Animation Studios	United States	Nominated	

== See also ==
- Submissions for Best Animated Short Academy Award
- Academy Award for Best Animated Feature
- Academy Award for Best Animated Short Film
