= Annie Award for Best Animated Feature – Independent =

Annual US film award

Annie Award for Best Animated Feature — Independent
- Awarded for: Excellence in independent animated films
- Country: United States
- Presented by: ASIFA-Hollywood
- First award: Boy and the World (2015)
- Currently held by: Arco (2025)
- Website: annieawards.org

The Annie Award for Best Animated Feature – Independent is an Annie Award introduced in 2015, awarded annually.

== Recognition ==
The category was created to recognize full-length films that did not get a wide release in the United States, such as the work of independent animators and international studios.

== Statistics ==
Cartoon Saloon, the Irish animation studio responsible for The Breadwinner and Wolfwalkers, have the most wins in this category with two. The French animation studio Folivari have the most nominations with four (winning for co-producing the aforementioned Wolfwalkers). GKIDS is the distributor with the most wins in this category with four.

Every winner in this category since its inception has gone on to be nominated for the Academy Award for Best Animated Feature. Flow became the first winner in this category to later go on to win said latter category.

== Winners and nominees ==
=== 2010s ===
| Year | Film | Director(s) | Studios | Country |
2015 (43rd)
| 2015 (43rd) | Boy and the World | Alê Abreu | Filme de Papel, GKIDS | Brazil |
| 2015 (43rd) | Kahlil Gibran's The Prophet | Roger Allers | Ventanarosa | Canada; France; Lebanon; Qatar; United States |
| 2015 (43rd) | The Boy and the Beast | Mamoru Hosoda | Studio Chizu | Japan |
| 2015 (43rd) | When Marnie Was There | Hiromasa Yonebayashi | Studio Ghibli | Japan |
2016 (44th)
| 2016 (44th) | The Red Turtle | Michaël Dudok de Wit | Studio Ghibli, Prima Linea Productions, Why Not Productions | Japan; France |
| 2016 (44th) | Long Way North | Rémi Chayé | Sacrebleu Productions, Maybe Movies, France 3 Cinéma | France; Denmark |
| 2016 (44th) | Miss Hokusai | Keiichi Hara | Production I.G | Japan |
| 2016 (44th) | Your Name | Makoto Shinkai | CoMix Wave Films | Japan |
| 2016 (44th) | My Life as a Zucchini | Claude Barras | Rita Productions, Blue Spirit Productions, Gebeka Films | Switzerland; France |
2017 (45th)
| 2017 (45th) | The Breadwinner | Nora Twomey | Cartoon Saloon, Aircraft Pictures, Melusine Productions, GKIDS | Canada; Ireland; Luxembourg |
| 2017 (45th) | The Big Bad Fox and Other Tales... | Benjamin Renner, Patrick Imbert | Folivari, Panique!, StudioCanal, GKIDS | France; Belgium |
| 2017 (45th) | In This Corner of the World | Sunao Katabuchi | MAPPA | Japan |
| 2017 (45th) | Napping Princess | Kenji Kamiyama | Nippon TV, Production I.G, GKIDS | Japan |
| 2017 (45th) | Loving Vincent | Dorota Kobiela, Hugh Welchman | BreakThru Films | Poland; United Kingdom |
2018 (46th)
| 2018 (46th) | Mirai | Mamoru Hosoda | Studio Chizu, GKIDS | Japan |
| 2018 (46th) | Ruben Brandt, Collector | Milorad Krstić | Hungarian National Film Fund | Hungary |
| 2018 (46th) | MFKZ | Shōjirō Nishimi, Guillaume "Run" Renard | Ankama, Studio 4°C, GKIDS | France; Japan |
| 2018 (46th) | This Magnificent Cake! | Marc James Roels, Emma de Swaef | Beast Animation, Vivement Lundi!, Pedri Animation | Belgium; France; Netherlands |
| 2018 (46th) | Tito and the Birds | Gabriel Bitar, André Catoto, Gustavo Steinberg | Bits Productions, Split Studio | Brazil |
2019 (47th)
| 2019 (47th) | I Lost My Body | Jérémy Clapin | Xilam | France |
| 2019 (47th) | Buñuel in the Labyrinth of the Turtles | Salvador Simó | Hampa Animation Studio | Spain |
| 2019 (47th) | Okko's Inn | Kitaro Kosaka | Madhouse Studios | Japan |
| 2019 (47th) | Promare | Hiroyuki Imaishi | Studio Trigger, XFLAG | Japan |
| 2019 (47th) | Weathering with You | Makoto Shinkai | CoMix Wave Films | Japan |

=== 2020s ===
| Year | Film | Director(s) | Studios | Country |
2020 (48th)
| 2020 (48th) | Wolfwalkers | Tomm Moore, Ross Stewart | Apple TV+, GKIDS, Folivari, Cartoon Saloon | Ireland; Luxembourg; France |
| 2020 (48th) | A Shaun the Sheep Movie: Farmageddon | Richard Phelan, Will Becher | StudioCanal, Aardman Animations, Anton Capital Entertainment, Netflix | United Kingdom; France |
| 2020 (48th) | Calamity Jane | Rémi Chayé | Maybe Movies | France; Denmark |
| 2020 (48th) | On-Gaku: Our Sound | Kenji Iwaizawa | Rock'n Roll Mountain, Tip Top | Japan |
| 2020 (48th) | Ride Your Wave | Masaaki Yuasa | Science Saru | Japan |
2021 (49th)
| 2021 (49th) | Flee | Jonas Poher Rasmussen | Final Cut for Real, Sun Creature, Vivement Lundi, MostFilm, Mer Film, VICE, Left HandFilms, Participant, NEON | Denmark; France; Norway; Sweden; United Kingdom; United States |
| 2021 (49th) | Belle | Mamoru Hosoda | Studio Chizu, GKIDS | Japan |
| 2021 (49th) | Fortune Favors Lady Nikuko | Ayumu Watanabe | Studio 4°C, GKIDS | Japan |
| 2021 (49th) | Pompo the Cinephile | Takayuki Hirao | CLAP Animation Studio, GKIDS | Japan |
| 2021 (49th) | The Summit of the Gods | Patrick Imbert | Julianne Films, Folivari, Mélusine Productions, France 3 Cinéma, Auvergne-Rhône-Alpes Cinéma, Wild Bunch, Palatine Etoile 17, Cinémage 14, Indéfilms 8, Netflix | France; Luxembourg |
2022 (50th)
| 2022 (50th) | Marcel the Shell with Shoes On | Dean Fleischer Camp | Marcel the Movie LLC, A24 | United States |
| 2022 (50th) | Charlotte | Éric Warin, Tahir Rana | January Films, Ltd., Balthazar Productions, Walking the Dog | Canada; Belgium; France |
| 2022 (50th) | Inu-Oh | Masaaki Yuasa | Science Saru, GKIDS | Japan |
| 2022 (50th) | Little Nicholas: Happy as Can Be | Amandine Fredon, Benjamin Massoubre | On Classics (Mediawan), Bidibul Productions | France |
| 2022 (50th) | My Father's Dragon | Nora Twomey | Cartoon Saloon, Netflix | Ireland; United States |
2023 (51st)
| 2023 (51st) | Robot Dreams | Pablo Berger | Arcadia Motion Pictures, Wild Bunch, NEON | Spain; France |
| 2023 (51st) | Ernest & Celestine: A Trip to Gibberitia | Julien Chheng, Jean-Christophe Roger | Folivari, Mélusine Productions, StudioCanal, GKIDS | France; Luxembourg |
| 2023 (51st) | Four Souls of Coyote | Áron Gauder | Cinemon Entertainment | Hungary |
| 2023 (51st) | The Inventor | Jim Capobianco | Curiosity Studios | United States; France; Ireland |
| 2023 (51st) | White Plastic Sky | Tibor Bánóczki, Sarolta Szabó | SALTO Films & Artichoke | Hungary; Slovakia |
2024 (52nd)
| 2024 (52nd) | Flow | Gints Zilbalodis | Sacrebleu Productions, Take Five, Dream Well Studio, Janus Films | Latvia; France; Belgium |
| 2024 (52nd) | Chicken for Linda! | Chiara Malta, Sébastien Laudenbach | Dolce Vita Films, Miyu Productions, Palosanto Films, France 3 Cinéma | France; Italy |
| 2024 (52nd) | Kensuke’s Kingdom | Neil Boyle, Kirk Hendry | Mélusine Productions | United Kingdom; Luxembourg; France |
| 2024 (52nd) | Look Back | Kiyotaka Oshiyama | Studio Durian | Japan |
| 2024 (52nd) | Mars Express | Jérémie Périn | Everybody on Deck, Je Suis Bien Content | France |
| 2024 (52nd) | Memoir of a Snail | Adam Elliot | Snails Pace Films / Arenamedia, IFC Films | Australia |
2025 (53rd)
| 2025 (53rd) | Arco | Ugo Bienvenu | Remembers, MountainA France, France 3 Cinéma, NEON | France |
| 2025 (53rd) | I Am Frankelda | Arturo and Roy Ambriz | Cinema Fantasma, Warner Bros. Discovery, Woo Films, Cine Vendaval | Mexico; United States |
| 2025 (53rd) | A Magnificent Life | Sylvain Chomet | Mediawan, What the Prod, Bidibul Productions | France; Belgium; United States; Luxembourg |
| 2025 (53rd) | Lost in Starlight | Han Ji-won | Netflix, Climax Studio | South Korea |
| 2025 (53rd) | Scarlet | Mamoru Hosoda | Studio Chizu | Japan |

== Multiple wins and nominations by studio ==
Wins by studio
| Wins | Studio |
|---|---|
| 2 | Cartoon Saloon |

Nominations by studio
| Nominations | Studio |
|---|---|
| 4 | Folivari |
| 4 | Mélusine Productions |
| 4 | Studio Chizu |
| 3 | Cartoon Saloon |
| 3 | StudioCanal |
| 2 | Studio Ghibli |
| 2 | CoMix Wave Films |
| 2 | Maybe Movies |
| 2 | Production I.G |
| 2 | Studio 4°C |
| 2 | Science Saru |
| 2 | Wild Bunch |
| 2 | Sacrebleu Productions |
| 2 | Bidibul Productions |
| 2 | Method Animation |

== See also ==
- Annecy Crystal for a Feature Film
- Golden Globe Award for Best Animated Feature Film
- Annie Award for Best Animated Feature
- Producers Guild of America Award for Best Animated Motion Picture
- BAFTA Award for Best Animated Film
- European Film Award for Best Animated Feature Film
