= Summer Ghost =

2021 Japanese animated short film by Loundraw

- Theatrical release poster
- Kanji: サマーゴースト
- Revised Hepburn: Samā Gōsuto
- Directed by: Loundraw
- Written by: Hirotaka Adachi
- Story by: Loundraw
- Starring: Chiaki Kobayashi; Miyuri Shimabukuro; Nobunaga Shimazaki; Rina Kawaei
- Music by: Akira Kosemura; Itoko Toma; Guiano; Hideya Kojima
- Production companies: Flat Studio; Flagship Line
- Distributed by: Avex Pictures
- Release date: November 12, 2021 (Japan)
- Running time: 40 minutes
- Country: Japan
- Language: Japanese

Summer Ghost (Japanese: サマーゴースト, Hepburn: Samā Gōsuto) is a Japanese animated fantasy drama short film produced by Flat Studio and directed by Loundraw. It was released in Japanese theaters by Avex Pictures on November 12, 2021.

== Plot ==
High school students Tomoya, Aoi and Ryō, who met via social media, decide to investigate rumors of a "Summer Ghost", which shows up at night on an abandoned airfield when fireworks are set off. As they do so, the ghost does in fact appear - it is a young woman named Ayane. She tells them that she can only be seen by people who have already reached out towards death. In flashbacks, it is revealed how this applies to the students: Tomoya has lost hope for his future because his controlling mother is forcing him to abandon his passion for art in favor of academic studies, Aoi is suicidal because of bullying, and Ryō has a terminal disease with less than a year to live.

Tomoya returns to meet Ayane again, and learns that she died after being hit by a car, whose driver then buried her in a suitcase to evade punishment. Helping Ayane find her body to give closure to her mother becomes an obsession for Tomoya, and when Aoi sees him by coincidence, she and Ryō decide to help, which eventually leads to success.

A year later, it is summer again, and Tomoya, Aoi and Ryō meet on the abandoned airfield. Their friendship has given Tomoya the courage to oppose his mother and pursue his artistic ambitions, and Aoi has found the confidence to confront her bullies. However, Ryō died in a hospital, in the presence of the other two. They have now come to meet him as a ghost.

== Voice cast ==
Character	Voice actor	
Character	Japanese	English
Tomoya Sugisaki (杉崎 友也, Sugisaki Tomoya)	Chiaki Kobayashi	David Errigo Jr.
Aoi Harukawa (春川 あおい, Harukawa Aoi)	Miyuri Shimabukuro	Kyla Carter
Ryō Kobayashi (小林 涼, Kobayashi Ryō)	Nobunaga Shimazaki	Clifford Chapin
Ayane Satō (佐藤 絢音, Satō Ayane)	Rina Kawaei	Megan Harvey

== Production ==
In June 2020, animator and illustrator Loundraw revealed that he is producing a short theatrical anime film as part of the Project Common multimedia project. The film was unveiled in February 2021, with the project serving as Loundraw's directorial debut. It is produced by Loundraw's company Flat Studio, with scripts written by Hirotaka Adachi, and music composed by Akira Kosemura, Itoko Toma, Guiano, and Hideya Kojima.

== Release ==
=== Theatrical ===
Summer Ghost was released in Japanese theaters on November 12, 2021, by its distributor Avex Pictures. It had its international premiere on the same day at the Leeds International Film Festival in England.

In North America, GKIDS screened the film in Japanese and English language formats in 2022. The film premiered at Anime Expo on July 3, 2022.

=== Home media ===
The film was released on Blu-ray in Japan on March 25, 2022. The limited-edition version includes the original soundtrack, an 80-minute documentary of the film's production, animatics, and a special booklet. GKIDS and Shout! Factory released the film in North America on November 1, 2022, on Blu-ray and digital platforms.

== Related media ==
A manga adaptation by Yoshi Inomi was serialized in Shueisha's Tonari no Young Jump website from October 8, 2021, to June 3, 2022. The chapters were compiled into two tankōbon volumes, released on November 19, 2021, and June 17, 2022.

Two novels were written by the film's scriptwriter Hirotaka Adachi. The first is a novelization that expands on the film's story which was released on October 29, 2021. The second is an original spin-off novel titled Ichinose Yūna ga Uiteiru (Yūna Ichinose Is Floating) which was released on November 26 of the same year.

In February 2023, Seven Seas Entertainment announced that they licensed the novel and manga adaptations. They were both released in digital and print formats on August 8 of the same year.
