= Alibaba (2002 film) =

- Directed by: Usha Ganeshrajah
- Written by: Sujatha
- Music by: Pravin Mani
- Production company: Pentamedia Graphics
- Release date: 26 July 2002 (United States)
- Running time: 90 minutes
- Country: India
- Language: English
- Budget: $15 million

Alibaba is a 2002 Indian English-language computer animated film directed by Usha Ganeshrajah. It was submitted for the Academy Award for Best Animated Feature at the 75th Academy Awards, but it was not nominated.

== Voice cast ==
- Robert Andrew as Alibaba
- Manny Rush as Kasim
- Sadie Leblanc as Margina
- Chris Nolan as Nur

== Soundtrack ==
The music was composed by Pravin Mani. The audio rights were bagged by Universal Studios.

- "Thieves of the Desert"
- "Long long time"
- "Ishq Deewana" - Sukhwinder Singh

== Release ==
The film was released in Las Vegas on 26 July 2002.

== Reception ==
Savitha Gautam of The Hindu wrote that "Whatever the quality of the production values may be, what matters most is that here is a group that is trying to fill a large gap... by making movies for children".
