= Satellite Girl and Milk Cow =

2014 film by Jang Hyung-yoon

- Directed by: Jang Hyung-yoon
- Written by: Jang Hyung-yoon; Park Ji-yoon; Jung Eun-kyung; Kang Sun-mi
- Produced by: Jo Young-gak
- Starring: Yoo Ah-in; Jung Yu-mi; Lee Don-yong; Hwang Seok-jung; Jo Young-bin; Jo Eun-sun
- Edited by: Lee Yeon-jung
- Music by: Ko Kyung-choon
- Production company: Now or Never
- Distributed by: Indieplug
- Release date: February 20, 2014
- Running time: 81 minutes
- Country: South Korea
- Language: Korean

Satellite Girl and Milk Cow (Korean: 우리별 일호와 얼룩소; RR: Uribyeol ilhowa eollukso) is a South Korean animated feature film that premiered in 2014. It was directed by Jang Hyung-yoon, who is known for short animations such as The Private Life of a Martial Arts Master and I Need a Dad. It was released in South Korea on February 20, 2014, and in North America on June 2, 2018, by GKIDS.

== Plot ==
Kyung-cheon, an ordinary college student with dreams of becoming a musician, loses his heart as everything in life, including music and love, seems to go wrong. One day, he transforms into a milk cow due to an unknown magical power and is chased by a man looking to harvest the livers of animals turned into humans, as well as a burner who wants to incinerate these transformed beings. Meanwhile, a satellite named Our Star No. 1, which has been drifting in space after losing contact with Earth, becomes interested in Kyung-cheon's song and descends to find its singer. In the process of descending, the satellite accidentally turns into a girl due to a magic spell cast by a wizard named Merlin. Eventually, Kyung-cheon, who has turned into a milk cow, meets the satellite and Merlin in his rooftop room, and their strange cohabitation begins.

== Characteristics ==
Jang Hyung-yoon, a graduate of the Korea Academy of Film Arts (KAFA), is one of the most well-known directors in the Korean independent animation scene, having established the studio 'Now or Never'. His works are described as having a "somewhat clumsy look and atmosphere, sweet love stories, and unpredictable comedic sense." He has created a unique world in his works, and this particular piece can be seen as an extension of that.

Notably, this film features Our Star No. 1, the first national satellite of South Korea, as the female protagonist. Jang Hyung-yoon explained the choice of featuring Our Star No. 1 as a character, stating, "Our Star No. 1 is in its early 20s in human years, has a similar weight to humans, and the fact that the satellite continues to look toward Earth despite losing contact is quite appealing."

The protagonist Kyung-cheon's name is derived from the music director Go Kyung-choon. Both the name and the character being a musician are similar. Reflecting the lives of modern Korean youth, the film prominently features real-life locations such as Hongdae, Seoul Tower, and the Han River.

=== Connections to Jang Hyung-yoon's previous works ===
The concept of a satellite turning into a human is similar to the premise of Jang Hyung-yoon's previous work 'The Private Life of a Martial Arts Master', where the protagonist Jin Yeong-young takes on the form of a vending machine and can transform back into a human at will. Additionally, the love story between a human-turned-satellite and a milk cow resembles the unique love stories shown in works such as 'Tea Time' and 'The Private Life of a Martial Arts Master'. Moreover, this film contains various settings, expressions, and characters drawn from Jang Hyung-yoon's past works. A specific short film from 2008 titled 'Oh! Indieful Film Festival Trailer' features a situation very similar to scenes in this film, and another 2009 short, 'Tomorrow Will Be Normal', shares notable similarities in character design and story elements.

== Characters ==
=== Main characters ===
- Kyung-cheon: Yoo Ah-in, Daniel J. Edwards (English)

A college student with a passion for music, he performs on Hongdae streets and even reaches the finals of an audition program. However, upon learning his love interest Eun-jin likes someone else, he loses his heart and turns into a milk cow. After being chased by the hunter and burner as a milk cow, he is saved by Il-ho and ends up living together with her in his studio apartment.

- Il-ho: Jung Yu-mi, Ryan Bartley (English)

Her full name is 'Our Star No. 1'. Originally an artificial satellite for observing Earth, she comes down after hearing Kyung-cheon's song as it drifts in space. During her descent, she accidentally acquires the form of a girl due to a spell cast by Merlin while saving Kyung-cheon. Although she has a human form, she retains special functions of a satellite, which helps her rescue Kyung-cheon during crises. Initially enamored with Kyung-cheon's music, she gradually develops feelings for him.

- Merlin: Lee Don-yong, Kirk Thornton (English)

A grand wizard descended from fairies but appears as a roll of toilet paper due to a tree being cut down for a golf course. He has magical power in his body, allowing him to cast spells and assist Kyung-cheon and Il-ho in various ways.

- Osa-jang: Jo Young-bin, Cam Clarke (English)

A hunter pursuing animals transformed from humans to obtain their livers. He can teleport via glass objects or cast spells, and he has recently made Kyung-cheon, the milk cow, his target.

- Burner:

A monster that captures humans who lost their hearts and turned into animals to burn them.

- Eun-jin: Jo Eun-sun

A junior in the same department as Kyung-cheon, whom he has a crush on.

- North Witch: Hwang Seok-jung, Julie Ann Taylor (English)

A witch who protects humans turned into animals by taking them to the forest. She resembles a wild boar.

- Black Dog: Jang Hyung-yoon

A black dog that Kyung-cheon keeps in his studio apartment.

- Landlady: Jo Tae-im, Jean Brownwell (English)

The owner of the studio apartment where Kyung-cheon lives.

=== Other characters ===
- Fantasy Couple Woman: Jung Yu-mi
- Fantasy Boy: Choi Do-young
- Professor: Jang Hyuk-jin
- Teaching Assistant: Choi Si-hyung
- Loan Shark: Jang Hyuk-jin
- Club Owner: Lee Don-yong
- News Anchor: Choi Jin-woo
- News Reporter: Jo Eun-sun
- Playground Kid: Choi Do-young
- Playground Mom: Choi Do-young
- Playground Police: Jang Hyuk-jin
- Playground People: Yeon Sang-ho, Hwang Seok-jung, Choi Jin-woo, Kim Chang-soo, Choi Si-hyung, Kim Hyung-mi, Kim Hye-jin
- General Yi Sun-sin: Jo Young-gak
- Bicycle Boy: Choi Si-hyung
- Passersby: Kim Yae-jin, Choi Jin-woo, Kim Chang-soo, Yeon Sang-ho, Jang Hyung-yoon
- Voice in the Dark: Jo Young-gak, Go Eun-ha, Pyo Yong-su

== Crew ==
- Production: Now or Never
- Provided/Distributed by: Indieplug
- Director: Jang Hyung-yoon
- Producer: Jo Young-gak
- Screenplay: Jang Hyung-yoon, Park Ji-yoon, Jung Eun-kyung, Kang Sun-mi
- Assistant Director: Park Ji-yoon
- Storyboard: Jang Hyung-yoon, Park Ji-yoon
- Character Design: Jang Hyung-yoon, Park Ji-yoon
- Animation Director: Kim Chang-soo
- Layout: Park Ji-yoon, Kim Chang-soo
- Production Producer: Lee Ho
- Original Art: Kim Young-guk, Lee Hyun-dae, Lee Eun-hye
- Digital Coloring: Kim Min-ho
- Editing: Lee Yeon-jung
- Art Director: Kim Young-jae
- Art Supervisor: Kim Eun-sook
- 3D Supervisor: Choi Dong-hyuk
- Digital Animation: Jo Yong-ik, Kwon Eun-jin
- Music Director: Go Kyung-choon
- Sound Supervisor: Pyo Yong-su

== OST ==
The ending song of the film "Beautiful Memory" serves as the main theme for the protagonist Kyung-cheon, while "Wait for Me" is the theme for the protagonist Il-ho.

No.	Title	Writer(s)	Artist	Length
1.	"Beautiful Memory"	Jang Hyung-yoon	Go Kyung-choon	5:12
2.	"Liar"	Go Kyung-choon	Go Kyung-choon	2:45
3.	"Your Worries"	Go Kyung-choon	Go Kyung-choon	4:41
4.	"Us"	Go Kyung-choon	Go Kyung-choon	2:51
5.	"Wait for Me"	Lee Hye-jun	Lee Hye-jun	2:59
6.	"Lake"	Go Kyung-choon	Go Kyung-choon	3:43

== Awards and nominations ==
Year	Awards/Festivals	Category	Nomination type	Result
2014	13th Dallas Asian Film Festival	Best Asian Feature Film	Feature Competition	Nominated
2014	18th Fantasia Film Festival	Satoshi Kon Award (Best Animation)	Fantasia Axis (Animation Competition)	Nominated
2014	18th Fantasia Film Festival	Jury Special Mention	Fantasia Axis (Animation Competition)	Won
2014	18th Seoul International Cartoon and Animation Festival	Grand Prix	Official Competition (Feature)	Nominated
2014	2nd Muju Film Festival	New Vision Award (Grand Prize)	Window (Korean Feature Film Competition)	Nominated
2014	47th Sitges Film Festival	Best Animated Feature Film	Anima't	Won
2014	52nd Gijón International Film Festival	AnimaFICX Award	AnimaFICX Feature	Nominated
2014	2014 Korean Content Awards	Minister of Culture, Sports and Tourism Award		Won
2014	8th Asia Pacific Screen Awards	Best Animation		Nominated
2015	32nd Anima – Brussels International Animation Festival	Grand Prix in International Competition	International Feature Film Competition	Nominated
2015	18th New York International Children's Film Festival	Grand Prize (Features)	Feature Film	Nominated
2015	18th Holland Animation Film Festival	Grand Prix in Feature	International Competition	Nominated
2015	17th Future Film Festival	Platinum Grand Prize	Platinum Competition	Nominated
2015	41st Seattle International Film Festival	Youth Jury Award	Films4Families	Nominated
2015	19th Golden Elephant International Children's Film Festival in India	Golden Elephant Award (Animated Feature)	International Animation Competition	Nominated
2015	13th Anilog International Animation Festival	Best Work Award	Feature Competition	Nominated
2016	17th Stockholm Junior Film Festival	Bronze Horse Award	11+ Category	Nominated

== Miscellaneous ==
On February 13, 2014, a premiere was held at the Lotte Cinema Hongdae Branch, attended by alumni from KAIST, who played a significant role in the development of Our Star No. 1. Among those present was Park Seong-dong (CEO of Satrec Initiative), who was responsible for mission analysis, thermal interpretation, and designing the receiver, demodulator, and antenna for Our Star No. 1. Other attendees included Lee Woo-kyung (a professor at Korea Aerospace University), Cheon Jin-hwan (director of the KAIST Alumni Association), Park Seong-jin (CEO of Storytoon), and Chu Gil-jae (CSO of Kaistory). Director Jang Hyung-yoon mentioned that it was his first time meeting someone involved with the satellite's development. Park Seong-dong expressed gratitude, saying, "Last August marked the 20th anniversary of the launch of Our Star No. 1. I felt grateful and pleased that someone used this subject to make a film."

== See also ==
- KITSAT-1
