= Pompo: The Cinéphile (film) =

2021 Japanese animated film by Takayuki Hirao

- Theatrical release poster
- Directed by: Takayuki Hirao
- Written by: Takayuki Hirao
- Based on: Pompo: The Cinéphile by Shogo Sugitani
- Produced by: Ryoichiro Matsuo; Kosuke Arai; Yoshinori Hasegawa; Tomohiko Iwase; Motoko Kaneiwa
- Starring: Konomi Kohara; Hiroya Shimizu; Ai Kakuma; Akio Otsuka; Ryuichi Kijima; Rinka Otani
- Cinematography: Kô Hoshina; Masashi Uoyama
- Edited by: Tsuyoshi Imai
- Music by: Kenta Matsukuma
- Production company: CLAP Animation Studio
- Distributed by: GKIDS
- Release date: June 4, 2021
- Running time: 90 minutes
- Country: Japan
- Language: Japanese
- Box office: ¥200,000,000 ($1.8 million)

Pompo: The Cinéphile (Japanese: 映画大好きポンポさん, Hepburn: Eiga Daisuki Ponpo-san) is a 2021 Japanese animated comedy-drama film written and directed by Takayuki Hirao. It is based on Shogo Sugitani's manga series of the same name. It stars the voices of Konomi Kohara, Hiroya Shimizu, Ai Kakuma, Akio Otsuka, Ryuichi Kijima, and Rinka Otani.

== Plot ==
Gene Fini, a nerdy, wannabe director with terrible bags under his eyes has been working as a production assistant to Joelle Davidovich Pomponett, or "Pompo" for around a year. Pompo is the owner of "Peterzen Films" in the fictional city "Nyallywood" (Parody of Hollywood with the Japanese onomatopoeia "Nyaa"). Pompo is a gutsy, outlandish, rude, and tomboyish film producer who, despite her talent, mostly works on cheesy B-movies. Pompo's new film, "Marine", starring her constant collaborator Mystia, wraps up shooting and asks Gene to edit the 15-second ad spot, which he reluctantly agrees to. He does so using unused footage, bringing concern from Pompo and the director, but pleasing them nonetheless.

Gene meets Pompo's grandfather, J.D Peterzen (Possibly a parody of Francis Ford Coppola), a former legend in the film industry and founder of Peterzen Films, at an early screening of Marine. Here, Gene asks Peterzen what it takes to be a great film director, and he tells him that he can make it for himself. While Gene watches Cinema Paradiso, Pompo scolds Gene for enjoying it due to it being a longer film. She admits that she dislikes films that run over 90 minutes, as she was forced by her grandfather to watch many over-lengthed films.

Gene then walks into Pompo's office to find a completed script for a film called "Meister", written by Pompo. Pompo tells him to read it, and it details a film about a burnt-out, obsessed, and distraught orchestra conductor, named Domergue, who finds meaning again after meeting a small girl named Lily in the Swiss Alps. Gene remarks that it is cliche, but very well written, but it will also need strong actors since the story's carried by only two characters. Then, a girl he'd seen at auditions a few days before named Natalie Woodward walks in with a haircut as requested by Pompo, who is being cast by Pompo as Lily, causing her to freak out.

We then rewind through Lily's life, and her early ambitions as an actress, moving to Nyallywood from the deep country, failures and rejections as an actress, working a variety of odd jobs, eventually auditioning for Pompo, and being denied. However, Pompo, with her "producer sense", was able to find something in her, and brought her back to the studio, though is once again unimpressed with her resume. Pompo tells Lily to be Mystia's protege for two weeks, which slowly helps her develop her acting skills.

Once in the present, Pompo reveals she wrote the role of Lily specifically for Nathalie, and that she had been starring alongside Martin Braddock (Possibly a parody of Marlon Brando), the semi-retired greatest actor in the world as Domergue. Pompo also reveals to Gene he will be the director, causing him to freak out as well. Due to this, at a party for the crew of the film, Gene and Natalie reveal to each other their doubts about their ability to direct and act respectively, but that they're going to give it their all.

On-location shooting for the film in the Alps begins. Gene is forced to work around the script and schedule after a rainstorm hits, allowing them to capture a rainbow not intended in the script. Gene also meets Alan Gardner, an old classmate of his from high school, who is unhappy with his job at a large bank. Alan apologizes for making fun of him for his obsession with film in high school and tells him to call him up if he needs anything.

On-location shooting wraps up, set shooting very quickly wraps up as well, and the film enters editing. Pompo assigns Gene as the editor, and Gene begins to find it hard to be able to get the film to a reasonable length with all the footage. Eventually, he decides to consult Peterzen once again, the director with who Pompo often works, telling him to think of the person he wants to make the film for the most. He decides to re-do the editing from the start, pushing it over schedule. This angers Pompo, as many financial sponsors pull out of the film. Gene pleads for an extra scene featuring Domergue's family, which she reluctantly agrees. The scene features Mystia playing Domergue's wife, though she is disguised due to not wanting to spoil Gene and Lily's potential fame from the film.

Meanwhile, Alan's bank, which was financing the film, is about to pull out funds due to the film going overschedule, before Alan notices and agrees to take up their account. He prepares a presentation involving interviews from the cast and crew of Meister but is still unconvincing to the bankers. So, Alan reveals that he had been publicly live streaming the meeting, causing a higher-up in the bank to intervene and agree to further fund the film.

Gene begins grinding out the Editing, sacrificing sleep and his health to continue editing, stating the film would not be his if he could not finish editing on time. Natalie agrees to accompany during this, although she is shocked by the amount Gene has to cut. Eventually, Gene is hospitalized due to fatigue, but wakes up and continues to edit against all odds. He finally finishes editing and shows it to Pompo, who for once is moved enough by a movie to sit through the credits. She then tells Gene that it's bound to win a Nyacamedy Award (Parody of the Academy Awards).

The film releases, and it's as big as Pompo predicted. The Nyacademy Awards come around, and it wins Best Original Screenplay for Pompo, Best Actor for Braddock (The seventh time allegedly), and Best Actress for Nathalie, much to her surprise. Gene is receiving an award for Best New Director, and during his acceptance speech, he is asked what his favorite thing about Meister is. Gene replies, "That it's only 90 minutes long".

== Cast ==
The actors participating in this film are:

- Konomi Kohara (Japanese); Brianna Gentilella (English) as Joelle Davidovich "Pompo" Pomponett
- Hiroya Shimizu (Japanese); Christopher Trindade (English) as Gene Fini
- Rinka Otani (Japanese); Jackie Lastra (English) as Natalie "Lily" Woodward
- Ai Kakuma (Japanese); Anne Yatco (English) as Mystia
- Akio Otsuka (Japanese); Kenneth Cavett (English) as Martín Braddock
- Ryuichi Kijima (Japanese); Jonah Platt (English) as Alan Gardner

== Release ==
Initially, its theatrical release was scheduled for some time in 2020, but was delayed to March 19, 2021. However, the film was further delayed due to the COVID-19 pandemic. The film was released on June 4, 2021, in Japanese theaters.

Pompo: The Cinéphile had a limited theatrical release in the United States on April 29, 2022, after GKIDS acquired the distribution rights.

=== Home media ===
Pompo: The Cinéphile was released digitally on June 28, 2022, followed by a Blu-ray/DVD combo release on July 12 of the same year.

== Reception ==
=== Critical reception ===
On the review aggregator website Rotten Tomatoes, 96% of 24 critics' reviews are positive, with an average rating of 7.7/10. Metacritic, which uses a weighted average, gave the film a score of 61 out of 100, based on 7 critics, indicating "generally favorable reviews".

=== Accolades ===
| Year | Award / Festival | Category | Recipient | Result | Ref. |
|---|---|---|---|---|---|
| 2021 | Fantasy Film Festival | Satoshi Kon Award - Best Animated Feature Film | Pompo: The Cinéphile | Nominated | |
| 2022 | Annie Awards | Best Animated Feature – Independent | Pompo: The Cinéphile | Nominated | |
| 2023 | Anime Trending Awards | Anime Movie of the Year | Pompo: The Cinéphile | Nominated | |
| 2023 | Chlotrudis Awards | Buried Treasure | Pompo: The Cinéphile | Nominated | |
