= On-Gaku: Our Sound =

2019 animated musical comedy film

- Directed by: Kenji Iwaizawa
- Written by: Kenji Iwaisawa
- Produced by: Tetsuaki Matsue
- Edited by: Kenji Iwaisawa
- Music by: Tomohiko Banse; Grandfunk; Wataru Sawabe
- Production companies: Rock’n Roll Mountain; Tip Top
- Distributed by: Nikkatsu Corporation; GKIDS (United States)
- Release date: 26 September 2019
- Running time: 71 minutes
- Country: Japan
- Language: Japanese

On-Gaku: Our Sound (Japanese: 音楽; lit. "Music") is a 2019 Japanese adult-animated jukebox musical comedy-drama film written, directed and animated by Kenji Iwaizawa, based on the 2005 self-published manga Ongaku to Manga by Hiroyuki Oohashi. The film was produced by the studios Rock'n Roll Mountain and Tip Top, and stars the voices of Shintaro Sakamoto, Tateto Serizawa, Tomoya Maeno, Ren Komai, Naoto Takenaka and Kami Hiraiwa. The plot concerns three high school delinquents with no prior musical experience who form their own rock music band.

On-Gaku had its world premiere at the Ottawa International Animation Festival on 26 September 2019, followed by a limited release in Japan on 11 January 2020. It received praise for its deadpan humour, musical score and vocal performances, and won Best Feature at the Ottawa International Animation Festival and the Ōfuji Noburō Award at the 75th Mainichi Film Awards. It was also nominated for Best Independent Animated Feature at the 48th Annie Awards and Best Animation Film at the 75th Mainichi Film Awards.

== Plot ==
Kenji, Ota and Asakura are presented as three high school delinquents who usually spend their time hanging out with each other and beating people up, though no fighting is ever shown on screen. Ota casually asks Kenji if he wants to go beat up the rival gang at Marutake High. Kenji agrees, and the three head out, but after realizing they have no idea where Marutake is, they lose interest.

Later on, Kenji is walking down the street when he witnesses a robbery. A passing musician thrusts his guitar into Kenji's hands while he tackles the thief. Kenji takes the guitar home, and tells his friends the next day that they are going to start a band. They steal more instruments from the school to complete their ensemble. Kenji was unaware the guitar he stole was a bass, so the band ends up consisting of two basses, a snare and a tom drum. Knowing nothing about music, the only music they make is harsh, rhythmic noise. Still, the boys are inspired. Their first audience is their only other friend, Aya. When she asks what the band name is, Asakura suggests Kobujutsu (ancient martial arts), which Kenji agrees to without further thought.

Throughout the film, the story occasionally cuts to the mohawked gang at Marutake, led by a boy named Oba. The gang believes Kenji is taking its members out in fights, when in reality they are being scared off by Kenji's mere presence. Oba plots to teach Kenji a lesson.

The next day, Asakura learns that there's a band at their school with an incredibly similar name, Kobijitsu (ancient fine arts). Instead of confronting the other band, Kenji decides to hear them play first. Kobijitsu is an acoustic folk trio led by singer Morita. While Kobijitsu are incredibly nervous to play for the school thugs, Kenji appreciates their music. In return, Kenji has Morita's band listen to their music. Morita is absolutely blown away by the raw, primal energy of the band, and asks if they will play an upcoming rock festival with them. Kenji agrees. The band begins to practice for the festival, but Kenji becomes despondent, claiming he's now bored of the band. Aya tries to talk some sense into him, but is unable to change his mind. After a short fight, Aya storms off, leaving the apathetic Kenji laying on the ground. Ota and Asakura are confident that Kenji will show up at the festival anyway.

On the day of the festival, Kenji is finally confronted by Oba's gang. Before Oba can fight him, Kenji smashes his bass and pulls out a recorder, playing it for a stunned Oba before running off, the gang chasing after him. At the festival, Ota and Asakura plan to play alone as Kobujutsu. Morita's Kobijitsu plays first. Inspired by Kenji's band, Morita's folk act has now become a fully fledged rock band. However, near the end, Morita's guitar breaks, and they walk off dejectedly. When Ota and Asakura get on stage, they freeze up, as Kenji has still not arrived.

Kenji, still being chased while playing recorder, leaps on stage. Kobujutsu, reunited, begins to play, and Morita's band joins in. Oba watches in disbelief as the crowd starts to get into the music. The band finishes their song, and Kenji, ecstatic, finally breaks out of his neutral exterior, and sings out passionately to the crowd.

The day after, Kenji has returned to his stoic self. Aya sits with him alone in an empty classroom, where Kenji reveals the band has broken up. Aya is disappointed, but Kenji goes on to ask if Aya will go to Disneyland with him. Ota sees the two talking, but quickly leaves. Outside, Ota asks Asakura if they should ask Kenji for a band reunion. Asakura agrees that Kenji will likely say yes later that day.

== Voice cast ==
- Shintaro Sakamoto as Kenji
- Tateto Serizawa as Asakura
- Tomoya Maeno as Ota
- Ren Komai as Aya
- Naoto Takenaka as Oba
- Kami Hiraiwa as Morita

== Release ==
On-Gaku has its world premiere at the Ottawa International Animation Festival on 26 September 2019, followed by a limited release in Japan on 11 January 2020.

== Reception ==
=== Critical reception ===
The film received praise from critics for its deadpan humour, musical score and vocal performances. On review aggregator Rotten Tomatoes, the film has an approval rating of 100% based on 12 reviews, and an average rating of 8.5/10. On Metacritic, the film has a score of 86 out of 100 based on 4 critical reviews, indicating "universal acclaim".

=== Accolades ===
Award	Date of ceremony	Category	Recipient(s)	Result	Ref.
Ottawa International Animation Festival	28 September 2019	Best Feature	Kenji Iwaisawa	Won	
Asian Film Awards	28 October 2020	Best Original Music	Tomohiko Banse, Grandfunk and Wataru Sawabe	Nominated	
Mainichi Film Awards	31 December 2020	Best Animation Film	On-Gaku: Our Sound	Nominated	
Mainichi Film Awards	31 December 2020	Ōfuji Noburō Award	On-Gaku: Our Sound	Won	
Annie Awards	16 April 2021	Best Animated Feature – Independent	On-Gaku: Our Sound	Nominated	
