= Sirocco and the Kingdom of Winds =

- French film poster
- French: Sirocco et le Royaume des courants d'air
- Directed by: Benoît Chieux
- Written by: Alain Gagnol; Benoît Chieux
- Produced by: Ron Dyens
- Starring: Loïse Charpentier; Maryne Bertieaux; Aurélie Konaté; Pierre Lognay; Laurent Morteau; Eric de Staercke; David Dos Santos; Géraldine Asselin
- Music by: Pablo Pico
- Production company: Sacrebleu Productions
- Distributed by: Haut et Court (France); Le Parc (Belgium)
- Release dates: 11 June 2023 (Annecy); 13 December 2023 (France); 13 December 2023 (Belgium)
- Running time: 74 minutes (Note: Sources vary on the film's runtime. Some sources, such as Box Office Mojo and the Toronto International Film Festival list the film's runtime as 74 minutes, while others, such as the Dallas Observer and the Seattle International Film Festival, list it as 80 minutes. Meanwhile, the Annecy International Animation Film Festival and Animation World Network have listed it at 76 minutes.)
- Countries: France; Belgium
- Language: French
- Box office: $902,063

Sirocco and the Kingdom of Winds (French: Sirocco et le Royaume des courants d'air, also known as Sirocco and the Kingdom of Air Streams) is a 2023 animated film directed by Benoît Chieux. Chieux also wrote the screenplay, along with Alain Gagnol.

== Plot ==
Agnès, author of the popular children’s book series The Kingdom of Winds, is writing a story of when Sirocco the wind magician created wooden toys to ease his loneliness but unleashed a storm upon the Kingdom after still feeling sad. As Agnès finishes the chapter she is visited by young girls Juliette and Carmen who are dropped off by their mother to be watched over by Agnès over the weekend. Having worked all night, Agnès goes for a nap while Juliette and Carmen tend to themselves.

When Juliette reads through one of Agnès' books, a wooden toy from the story Agnès just wrote falls out after having been accidentally transported from the Kingdom. Annoyed, it draws up a magical hopscotch which acts as a portal back. An elated Juliette chases it while a shocked Carmen follows behind.

The girls find themselves in a village in the Kingdom and also discover they have been transformed into cats. Juliette convinces Carmen to do some sightseeing before they return as it happens to be her birthday, however she almost immediately upsets the locals by accidentally destroying a gift they have prepared for travelling opera singer Selma. The toy is also damaged, preventing their return. As punishment for the destroyed gift the village leader condemns Carmen to marry his son and Juliette to be given to Selma as a replacement gift.

Juliette befriends Selma after the opera performance and explains the situation. Selma realizes the toy was made by Sirocco as she briefly met him once in the past before a mysterious storm separated them. Together, Selma and Juliette rescue Carmen and they go on a journey to find Sirocco for help. Upon entering the Forbidden Lands, Carmen and Selma are separated from Juliette and end up at a large stone structure that begins to crumble and unleashes a mysterious creature, the storm. Selma infers that Sirocco is not the maker of the storm that has been ravaging the Kingdom, but rather its jailer. His feeling of love towards her, first emerged in their past meeting and now by Juliette having found and informed him of their arrival, destabilizes his power and allows the storm to escape.

The storm's winds critically injure Selma just as Sirocco and Juliette arrive. Sirocco uses his power to revive her, also sacrificing himself. Through wit, cooperation, and the last of Sirocco's powers, Selma and the others neutralize the storm and save the Kingdom. Later, Selma manages to return Juliette and Carmen to their world where hardly no time has passed.

Juliette, Carmen, and Agnès gather to celebrate Juliette's birthday and suggest her to make birthday cake wishes. Juliette wishes to see Selma again and for Sirocco to return. A gust of wind with Sirocco's visage briefly in it enters the house and helps her extinguish all the cake candles, suggesting her wishes will come true.

== Cast ==
Character	French voice	English voice
Juliette	Loïse Charpentier	Élia St-Pierre
Carmen	Maryne Bertieaux	Tallula Dinsmoore
Selma	Aurélie Konaté	Lucina Davis
Sirocco	Pierre Lognay	Terrence Scammell
Le maire	Eric de Staercke	Marcel Jeannin
Le fils du maire	David Dos Santos	Wyatt Bowen
Agnès	Géraldine Asselin	Briauna James
Le jouet	Laurent Morteau	Bruce Dinsmoore

Célia Kameni provides the singing voice for Selma.

== Production and release ==
A French and Belgian co-production, Sirocco was directed by French filmmaker Benoît Chieux and written by Alain Gagnol and Chieux. Chieux drew inspiration from Yellow Submarine, the French illustrator Mœbius, and Japanese animation filmmaker Hayao Miyazaki.

Its world premiere was at the 2023 Annecy International Animation Film Festival, where it served as the festival's opening night feature. Sirocco had its French theatrical release on 13 December 2023, with Haut et Court distributing the film. In January 2024, film distributor GKIDS acquired the Northern American rights of the film. Sirocco received various screenings at American film festivals prior to its theatrical release in the United States. Its U.S. debut came at the 2023 Animation Is Film Festival. The film was theatrically released in Hungary and Russia in June 2024, and later in Romania on 30 August. Through GKIDS, the film received its limited theatrical release in the United States on 11 August 2024.

== Reception ==
=== Box office ===
The film has grossed $910,319 worldwide. Much of its gross comes from its home market of France, where it has grossed $827,680.

=== Critical reception ===
Sirocco received positive critical reception. Due to its plot and psychedelic visual style, critics likened the film to Alice in Wonderland, Yellow Submarine, and Studio Ghibli films. Writing for Variety, Peter Debruge wrote that Sirocco "suggests France's answer to a film like Spirited Away, by way of all the other aforementioned references — and yet, there's an originality to it that keeps things surprising." Debruge opined that the film would be most appreciated by "the oddity-seeking art-house crowd". Hannah Baek, writing for the Seattle International Film Festival praised Sirocco's "portrayals of empathy, unapologetic confidence, and enduring sisterly love", as well as its style. Both Baek and Debruge also added praise for French-Cameroonian jazz vocalist Célia Kameni's contributions to the film's soundtrack.

Sirocco won the award for best animated film at the 2024 Stuttgart Festival for Animated Film.

== See also ==
- List of animated feature films of 2023
- List of French films of 2023
