= Okko's Inn =

Series of novels by Hiroko Reijō

- North American film poster

若おかみは小学生！ (Waka Okami wa Shōgakusei!)
- Genre: Family
- Novel series
- Written by: Hiroko Reijō
- Illustrated by: Asami
- Published by: Kodansha
- Imprint: Aoi Tori Bunko
- Original run: 2003 – 2013
- Volumes: 20 (list of volumes)
- Manga
- Illustrated by: Eiko Ōuchi
- Published by: Kodansha
- Imprint: Kodansha Comics Nakayoshi
- Magazine: Nakayoshi
- Original run: 2006 – 2012
- Volumes: 7
- Anime television series
- Directed by: Mitsuyuki Masuhara; Azuma Tani
- Written by: Michiko Yokote
- Music by: Takeshi Hama
- Studio: DLE; Madhouse
- Original network: TXN (TV Tokyo)
- Original run: April 8, 2018 – September 23, 2018
- Episodes: 24
- Anime film
- Directed by: Kitaro Kosaka
- Written by: Reiko Yoshida
- Music by: Keiichi Suzuki
- Studio: DLE; Madhouse
- Licensed by: BI: Manga Entertainment; NA: GKIDS
- Released: June 11, 2018
- Runtime: 94 minutes

Okko's Inn (若おかみは小学生！, Waka Okami wa Shōgakusei!; transl. "The Young Innkeeper is a Student!") is a series of Japanese children's novels, written by Hiroko Reijō and illustrated by Asami. Kodansha released twenty volumes between 2003 and 2013 under the Aoi Tori Bunko imprint. A manga adaptation with art by Eiko Ōuchi was serialized in Kodansha's shōjo manga Nakayoshi and collected in seven tankōbon volumes.

== Plot ==
One March, Oriko "Okko" Seki with her parents Shoji and Sakiko travel to Hananoyu's ritual dance for an annual Shinto spring festival celebrating the hot springs. After surviving a car accident where her parents are killed, Okko moves in with her grandmother Mineko at the Harunoya Inn, a ryokan in Hananoyu hot spa town in the shadow of Mount Ikoma in Kongō-Ikoma-Kisen Quasi-National Park near Osaka. There, the gawky and creature-shy young girl befriends the ghost of a boy named Makoto "Uribo" Tachiuri, the late childhood friend and one-time next-door neighbour of Mineko. Uribo convinces Okko into becoming the junior innkeeper for her grandmother. At first, she finds her job exhausting and it hard to do it all wearing a formal kimono, but Uribo encourages her to do well.

At school, Okko meets Matsuki Akino — nicknamed Frilly Pink — a snobbish and haughty girl with a pink lolita fashion sense, whose family runs Shuko Ryokan at Hananoyu, a competing inn, but considerably larger and more up-market. Uribo tries to provoke Matsuki by painting her face, but a blond girl ghost retaliates by painting Okko's. Later, the ghost reveals herself to be Miyo, Matsuki's late sister, who died before the latter was born. She mocks Okko and her innkeeping abilities. However, since Okko can see her and talk with her, Miyo decides to move in at Harunoya Inn instead of her family's at Hananoyu.

Okko invites a disheveled man and his son Akane to the inn, since it "rejects no one". The staff learn of the death of Akane's mother and of his recalcitrance due to his grief. He requests a cake from the kitchen. The inn has none, but Okko feels inspired to make a new recipe for a "hot bath" pudding resembling hot spring water. Akane and his father are impressed by the pudding and the shrine. Okko assists everyone and Akane's father writes a magazine review praising the inn. The review brings in admirers of Okko who regularly fill the inn.

One of the summer guests is a fortune teller named Glory Suiryo. She invites Okko on a shopping trip. On the way Okko is paralyzed in a panic attack by a flashback of the fatal car crash, but Glory comforts her when she reveals her story. Okko imagines her parents near her, along with Uribo and Miyo, which comforts her.

Okko unwraps a box containing a bell received from her late grandfather and accidentally releases Suzuki, a baby demon, whom Okko greets with a bad temper. Okko puts the ghosts and demon to work in helping her run the inn. As Okko becomes cheerier, and so less grief-stricken, though, Suzuki notices Okko is losing the ability to see ghosts.

Matsuki and Okko are selected to perform the town's ritual dance at the annual Shinto spring festival. In a rehearsal at which Matsuki dances perfectly, Okko innate clumsiness causes her to fall whereupon the two end up bickering at one another and go on to a full-throated slanging match to the consternation of the dance instructor. The two then storm off in anger.

As winter approaches, an infant boy named Shota Kise arrives with his mother and father, who has recently recovered from his traumatic injuries, at the inn for the healing waters. Shota's father finds his food bland and unsatisfying. Okko remembers Matsuki was working on a menu. Setting aside her rivalry to please Mr Kise, she swallows her pride and visits Matsuki at her inn to ask for help. Matsuki gives her a sample of beef and cooking tips for food that the father does not find so bland. But then the Kises reveal Shota's father survived a road accident where he hit another car and became comatose. The family that was in the other car died in the crash, leaving their only daughter alive. Okko realizes that Mr Kise had inadvertently caused her parents' deaths and hurriedly leaves sobbing. Uribo and Miyo try to comfort Okko, but it seems that she has lost her ability to see and talk to supernatural beings, causing her to cry even more, believing that she had been left behind. On a premonition, Glory suddenly arrives and consoles Okko. She sees the Kises preparing to leave the inn, much to their son's distress. Okko invites the Kises to stay at the inn.

Reconciled months later, Okko and Matsuki perform at the local annual ritual dance at the Shinto spring festival. The ghosts move on to their next life and visit them once again someday.

== Voice cast ==
Characters	Japanese	English
Oriko "Okko" Seki (関 織子, Seki Oriko)	Seiran Kobayashi	Madigan Kacmar
Makoto "Uribo" Tateuri (立売 誠, Tateuri Makoto)	Satsumi Matsuda	KJ Aikens
Matsuki Akino (秋野 真月, Akino Matsuki)	Nana Mizuki	Carly Williams
Miyo Akino		Tessa Frascogna
Mineko Seki (関 峰子, Seki Mineko)	Yōko Asagami (old); Kana Hanazawa (young)	Glynis Ellis (old); Fiona Fatuova (young)
Kōnosuke Minoda (蓑田 康之介, Minoda Kōnosuke)	Masaki Terasoma	Scott Williams
Etsuko Tajima (田島 エツ子, Tajima Etsuko)	Teiyū Ichiryūsai	Noelle DePaula
Suzuki (鈴鬼)	Etsuko Kozakura	Colleen O'Shaughnessey
Glory Suiryo (グローリー水領, Suiryō Gurōrī)	Chiaki Horan	Brittany Cox
Shoji Seki (関 正次, Seki Shōji)	Hirohide Yakumaru	James Weaver Clark
Sakiko Seki (関 咲子, Seki Sakīko)	Anju Suzuki	Alyson Leigh Rosenfeld

== Release ==
An anime television series aired from April 8 to September 23, 2018, and was produced by DLE and Madhouse. The anime film premiered at the Annecy International Animation Film Festival on June 11, 2018 and on September 12 in France and September 21 in Japan. It was licensed by GKIDS in North America, and was released in the United States on 22 and 23 April 2019. The film was released on DVD and Blu-ray by Shout! Factory on July 2, 2019.

== Reception ==
=== Novel ===
The novel series has over 3 million volumes in print.

=== Anime film ===
The anime film received the Excellence Award in the animation category at the 22nd Japan Media Arts Festival. It was nominated for an Annie Award for Best Animated Feature - Independent.
