= GKIDS =

American animated films distributor

GKIDS, Inc.
- Type: Subsidiary
- Industry: Entertainment
- Founded: 2008; 18 years ago
- Founder: Eric Beckman
- Headquarters: 225 Broadway, Lower Manhattan, New York City, U.S.
- Key people: Eric Beckman (CEO); Dave Jesteadt (president)
- Products: Motion pictures; Television series
- Owner: Toho
- Parent: Toho International (2025–present)
- Website: gkids.com

GKIDS, Inc. is an American film and television distributor. Based in New York City, GKIDS releases mostly international animated films and television series to North American audiences, as well as American films by independent filmmakers. The name is said to be an acronym for "Guerrilla Kids International Distribution Syndicate".

In March 2024, The Boy and the Heron became the company's first theatrical release to win Best Animated Feature Film at the Academy Awards. In October 2024, it was announced GKIDS would be sold to Japanese entertainment company Toho, becoming a subsidiary of the Los Angeles–based Toho International. The deal was completed in 2025.

== History ==
GKIDS was founded by Eric Beckman in 2008. He previously co-founded and ran the New York International Children's Film Festival. Their first general release was Azur & Asmar, a French film dubbed in English for British and Irish audiences.

The company attained national recognition with the 2010 release of The Secret of Kells, which received a nomination for Best Animated Feature at the 82nd Academy Awards. They also received two more Best Animated Feature nominations at the 84th Academy Awards, Spanish-language Chico and Rita and French-language A Cat in Paris. Both nominations were considered highly surprising by film insiders, beating out such notables as The Adventures of Tintin and Cars 2. This marked the first time that an independent distributor had two films in the Best Animated Feature category in the same year, a decision which Puss in Boots director Chris Miller said indicated the academy's "respect for diversity."

In September 2011, GKIDS announced the acquisition of the North American theatrical distribution rights to the Studio Ghibli library, which were previously held by Walt Disney Studios Motion Pictures. Walt Disney Studios Home Entertainment, however, retained the home media distribution rights. GKIDS would later also managed the North American distribution of three new Studio Ghibli films: From Up on Poppy Hill in 2013, The Tale of the Princess Kaguya in 2014, and When Marnie Was There in 2015 as well as the first-time North American releases of Only Yesterday and Ocean Waves in 2016.

On July 17, 2017, it was announced that the North American home media rights to the Ghibli library (with the exception of Grave of the Fireflies and The Wind Rises) had transitioned from Disney to GKIDS, with the distributor announcing plans to begin re-issuing the films beginning in October. The Wind Rises would eventually be reissued by GKIDS on September 2020.

In 2020, partnering with TMS Entertainment, GKIDS handled the American and Canadian release of Lupin III: The First, a 3DCG film adaptation of Monkey Punch's (Kazuhiko Kato) Lupin the Third franchise.

In October 2020, GKIDS announced their license to the Neon Genesis Evangelion TV series, as well as the films Death (True)^{2} and The End of Evangelion for a release in 2021.

In February 2022, GKIDS and Fox Corporation's Tubi announced that they had entered into a content partnership deal.

In March 2022, GKIDS announced their license to Makoto Shinkai's earlier works, Voices of a Distant Star, The Place Promised in Our Early Days, 5 Centimeters per Second (2007), and Children Who Chase Lost Voices, all of which were scheduled for release on home video in 2022.

On October 15, 2024, Toho announced its intent to acquire GKIDS for an undisclosed amount. The deal was completed in 2025, with GKIDS officially becoming a subsidiary of Toho International.

On July 2, 2026, under a partnership with sister company Anime Limited, GKIDS announced it had acquired the distribution rights to Studio Ghibli's catalogue in the United Kingdom and Ireland, aligning with Toho's European expansion.

== Style and reception ==
Founder Eric Beckman has described the animated market in the U.S. as "dominated by expensive-to-produce, expensive-to-distribute movies." GKIDS received Oscar nominations for each of its first three films.

GKIDS has been called "one of the most notable independent distribution companies in the US," and "the country's best distributor [for] traditional hand-drawn animation." Industry magazine Film Journal International said, "The reason GKIDS films keep getting nominated despite the company's low profile is that, simply put, their films tend to be really good."

Twenty-two feature films released by GKIDS have a perfect, 100% "Fresh" rating on review aggregator Rotten Tomatoes: Sita Sings the Blues, Approved for Adoption, The Tale of the Princess Kaguya, Only Yesterday, Mind Game, Grave of the Fireflies, Never-Ending Man: Hayao Miyazaki, This Magnificent Cake!, Okko's Inn, On-Gaku: Our Sound, Goodbye, Don Glees!, Summer Ghost, Evangelion: 3.0+1.0 Thrice Upon a Time, The First Slam Dunk, Ernest & Celestine: A Trip to Gibberitia, Blue Giant, Mars Express, Sirocco and the Kingdom of the Winds, Look Back (2024), 100 Meters, Angel's Egg, and The Last Blossom. Sita Sings the Blues, combining stylistic elements of Rajput painting, shadow puppetry, vector graphic animation, and Squigglevision, was selected by Chicago Sun-Times reviewer Roger Ebert for his annual Ebertfest, calling it "one of the year's best films".

Not all have been broadly successful with critics, though: Mia and the Migoo (38%), Tales from Earthsea (37%), Fireworks (45%), MFKZ (39%), Earwig and the Witch (28%), The Deer King (59%) Lonely Castle in the Mirror (50%), and Labyrinth (20%) are, as of August 2026, the only eight with "Rotten" ratings.

== Films distributed by GKIDS ==
US title	Original title	Country	US release	Rotten Tomatoes score
Tahaan: A Boy With a Grenade	Tahaan	India	September 5, 2008	—N/a
Azur & Asmar: The Princes' Quest	Azur et Asmar	France	October 17, 2008 (New York); November 27, 2008	80%
Trouble at Timpetill	Les Enfants de Timpelbach	France	August 22, 2009 (New York)	—N/a
Sita Sings the Blues	Sita Sings the Blues	United States	December 25, 2009 (New York)	100%
The Secret of Kells	The Secret of Kells	France, Belgium, Ireland	March 5, 2010 (New York); March 19, 2010	90%
West of Pluto	À l'ouest de Pluton	Canada	March 26, 2010	—N/a
Summer Wars	Samā Wōzu	Japan	December 3, 2010	81%
Eleanor's Secret	Kérity, la maison des contes	France	January 21, 2011	—N/a
Mia and the Migoo	Mia et le Migou	France-Italy	March 25, 2011 (New York); April 22, 2011	38%
The Studio Ghibli Collection Nausicaä of the Valley of the Wind Castle in the Sky My Neighbor Totoro Kiki's Delivery Service Only Yesterday Porco Rosso Ocean Waves Pom Poko Whisper of the Heart Princess Mononoke My Neighbors the Yamadas Spirited Away The Cat Returns	The Studio Ghibli Collection Kaze no Tani no Naushika Tenkū no Shiro Rapyuta Tonari no Totoro Majo no Takkyūbin Omohide Poroporo Kurenai no Buta Umi ga Kikoeru Heisei Tanuki-Gassen Ponpoko Mimi o Sumaseba Mononoke-hime Hōhokekyo: Tonari no Yamada-kun Sen to Chihiro no Kamikakushi Neko no Ongaeshi	Japan	December 16, 2011	89% 96% 93% 98% 100% 95% 88% 83% 92% 93% 78% 96% 90%
Chico & Rita	Chico y Rita	Spain	February 10, 2012 (New York); February 17, 2012	88%
A Cat in Paris	Une vie de chat	France	June 1, 2012	83%
Tales of the Night	Les Contes de la nuit	France	September 26, 2012	80%
The Rabbi's Cat	Le Chat du rabbin	France	December 7, 2012 (New York); January 4, 2013	94%
Approved for Adoption	Couleur de peau: miel	France-Belgium	February 8, 2013 (New York)	100%
Wrinkles	Arrugas	Spain	February 8, 2013	93%
A Letter to Momo	Momo e no Tegami	Japan	February 10, 2013	80%
From Up on Poppy Hill	Kokuriko-zaka kara	Japan	March 15, 2013	87%
The Painting	Le Tableau	France	May 10, 2013	81%
Ernest & Celestine	Ernest et Célestine	France-Belgium	February 28, 2014	98%
Patema Inverted	Sakasama no Patema	Japan	August 29, 2014	73%
Nocturna	Nocturna, una aventura magica	Spain-France	September 4, 2014	—N/a
Welcome to The Space Show	Uchū Show e Yōkoso	Japan	October 14, 2014	—N/a
The Tale of the Princess Kaguya	Kaguya-hime no Monogatari	Japan	October 17, 2014	100%
Song of the Sea	Song of the Sea	Ireland	December 19, 2014	99%
The Kingdom of Dreams and Madness	Yume to Kyōki no Ōkoku	Japan	January 27, 2015	92%
When Marnie Was There	Omoide no Marnie	Japan	May 22, 2015	92%
Zarafa	Zarafa	France-Belgium	July 3, 2015	76%
Kahlil Gibran's The Prophet	Kahlil Gibran's The Prophet	Canada	August 7, 2015	65%
Boy and the World	O Menino e o Mundo	Brazil	December 11, 2015	93%
Only Yesterday	Omoide Poroporo	Japan	January 1, 2016	100%
April and the Extraordinary World	Avril et le Monde truqué	France-Belgium-Canada	April 1, 2016	97%
Phantom Boy	Phantom Boy	France-Belgium	July 15, 2016	88%
A Town Called Panic: Double Fun	Panique au Village: Double Plaisir	France-Belgium	September 24, 2016	—N/a
Miss Hokusai	Sarusuberi: Miss Hokusai	Japan	October 14, 2016	93%
Ocean Waves	Umi ga Kikoeru	Japan	December 28, 2016	89%
My Life as a Zucchini	Ma vie de Courgette	Switzerland-France	February 24, 2017	99%
My Entire High School Sinking into the Sea	My Entire High School Sinking into the Sea	United States	April 14, 2017	84%
The Girl Without Hands	La Jeune Fille sans mains	France	July 21, 2017	95%
Mune: Guardian of the Moon	Mune, le gardien de la lune	France	August 12, 2017	80%
Revolting Rhymes	Revolting Rhymes	United Kingdom	August 15, 2017	86%
Napping Princess	Hirune-hime: Shiranai Watashi no Monogatari	Japan	September 8, 2017	68%
The Breadwinner	The Breadwinner	Canada-Ireland-Luxembourg	November 17, 2017	95%
Howl's Moving Castle	Hauru no Ugoku Shiro	Japan	November 26, 2017	88%
Mary and the Witch's Flower	Meari to Majo no Hana	Japan	January 18, 2018	89%
Tales from Earthsea	Gedo Senki	Japan	February 6, 2018	37%
Mind Game	Maindo Gēmu	Japan	February 16, 2018	100%
Birdboy: The Forgotten Children	Psiconautas, los niños olvidados	Spain	March 13, 2018	94%
Ponyo	Gake no Ue no Ponyo	Japan	March 25, 2018	91%
Lu Over the Wall	Yoaketsugeru Rū no Uta	Japan	May 11, 2018	78%
Satellite Girl and Milk Cow	Uribyeol Ilho-wa Eollukso	South Korea	June 5, 2018	—N/a
Fireworks	Uchiage Hanabi, Shita Kara Miru ka? Yoko Kara Miru ka?	Japan	July 3, 2018	45%
Grave of the Fireflies	Hotaru no Haka	Japan	August 12, 2018	100%
The Night Is Short, Walk On Girl	Yoru wa Mijikashi Aruke yo Otome	Japan	August 21, 2018	90%
Perfect Blue	Pāfekuto Burū	Japan	September 6, 2018	84%
The Big Bad Fox and Other Tales...	Le Grand Méchant Renard et autres contes...	France-Belgium	September 23, 2018	97%
MFKZ	Mutafukaz	France-Japan	October 11, 2018	39%
Mirai	Mirai no Mirai	Japan	November 29, 2018	90%
Never-Ending Man: Hayao Miyazaki	Owaranai Hito Miyazaki Hayao	Japan	December 13, 2018	100%
Modest Heroes	Chīsana Eiyū: Kani to Tamago to Tōmei Ningen	Japan	January 7, 2019	86%
This Magnificent Cake!	Ce magnifique gâteau!	Belgium, France, The Netherlands	March 1, 2019	100%
Okko's Inn	Waka Okami wa Shōgakusei!	Japan	April 22, 2019	100%
Funan	Funan	France-Luxembourg-Belgium	June 7, 2019	93%
Buñuel in the Labyrinth of the Turtles	Buñuel en el laberinto de las tortugas	Spain	August 16, 2019	98%
Another Day of Life	Jeszcze dzień życia	Poland, Spain, Belgium, Germany, Hungary	September 13, 2019	89%
The Case of Hana & Alice	Hana to Arisu Satsujin Jiken	Japan	September 17, 2019	—N/a
Promare	Promare	Japan	September 20, 2019	97%
The Secret World of Arrietty	Kari-gurashi no Arietti	Japan	September 29, 2019	94%
Genius Party	Jīniasu Pāti	Japan	October 15, 2019	—N/a
Genius Party Beyond	Jīniasu Pāti Biyondo	Japan	October 15, 2019	—N/a
Weathering with You	Tenki no Ko	Japan	October 18, 2019 (award-qualifying run); January 17, 2020	93%
White Snake	Báishé: Yuánqǐ	China	November 15, 2019	70%
Aya of Yop City	Aya de Yopougon	France	November 26, 2019	—N/a
Summer Days with Coo	Kappa no Kū to Natsuyasumi	Japan	January 21, 2020	—N/a
Ride Your Wave	Kimi to, Nami ni Noretara	Japan	February 19, 2020	93%
Tokyo Godfathers	Tōkyō Goddofāzāzu	Japan	March 9, 2020	92%
Marona's Fantastic Tale	L'Extraordinaire Voyage de Marona	France	June 21, 2020	96%
Children of the Sea	Kaijū no Kodomo	Japan	August 11, 2020	62%
The Wind Rises	Kaze Tachinu	Japan	September 1, 2020	88%
Wolfwalkers	Wolfwalkers	Ireland, Luxembourg, France	November 13, 2020	99%
On-Gaku: Our Sound	Music	Japan	November 20, 2020	100%
Lupin III: The First	Rupan Sansei Za Fāsuto	Japan	December 11, 2020	95%
Earwig and the Witch	Āya to Majo	Japan	February 3, 2021	28%
Lupin III: The Castle of Cagliostro	Rupan Sansei Kariosutoro no Shiro	Japan	July 16, 2021	96%
Evangelion: Death (True)²	Shin Seiki Evangerion Gekijōban: Shi to Shinsei	Japan	December 8, 2021	—N/a
The End of Evangelion	Shin Seiki Evangerion Gekijōban: Air/Magokoro wo, Kimi ni	Japan	December 8, 2021	92%
Belle	Belle: Ryū to Sobakasu no Hime	Japan	January 14, 2022	95%
Pompo the Cinephile	Eiga Daisuki Pompo-san	Japan	April 29, 2022	96%
Panda! Go, Panda!	Panda Kopanda	Japan	May 6, 2022	—N/a
Panda! Go, Panda!: Rainy Day Circus	Panda Kopanda: Amefuri Circus no Maki	Japan	May 6, 2022	—N/a
Fortune Favors Lady Nikuko	Gyokō no Nikuko-chan	Japan	June 3, 2022	91%
5 Centimeters per Second (2007)	Byōsoku Go Senchimētoru (2007)	Japan	June 7, 2022	—N/a
Voices of a Distant Star	Hoshi no Koe	Japan	June 7, 2022	—N/a
The Place Promised in Our Early Days	Kumo no Mukō, Yakusoku no Basho	Japan	June 7, 2022	71%
Children Who Chase Lost Voices	Hoshi wo Ou Kodomo	Japan	June 7, 2022	—N/a
The Deer King	Shika no Ō: Yuna to Yakusoku no Tabi	Japan	July 13, 2022	59%
Inu-Oh	Inu-Oh	Japan	August 12, 2022	91%
Goodbye, Don Glees!	Gubbai, Don Gurīzu!	Japan	September 14, 2022	100%
Summer Ghost	Samā Gōsuto	Japan	November 1, 2022	100%
Evangelion: 3.0+1.0 Thrice Upon a Time	Shin Evangerion Gekijō-ban: 𝄂	Japan	December 6, 2022	100%
New Gods: Yang Jian	Xin Shen Bang: Yang Jian	China	January 20, 2023	63%
Giovanni's Island	Joban'ni no Shima	Japan	February 21, 2023	78%
Unicorn Wars	Unicorn Wars	Spain	March 10, 2023	81%
Spirited Away: Live on Stage	Butai "Sen to Chihiro no Kamikakushi"	Japan	April 23, 2023	—N/a
Lonely Castle in the Mirror	Kagami no Kojō	Japan	June 21, 2023	50%
The First Slam Dunk	The First Slam Dunk	Japan	July 28, 2023	100%
Ernest & Celestine: A Trip to Gibberitia	Ernest et Célestine: Le voyage en Charabie	France	September 1, 2023	100%
Blue Giant	Blue Giant	Japan	October 8, 2023	100%
The Boy and the Heron	Kimitachi wa Dō Ikiru ka	Japan	December 8, 2023	96%
Chicken for Linda!	Linda veut du poulet!	France	April 5, 2024	94%
Mars Express	Mars Express	France	May 3, 2024	100%
Ghost in the Shell 2: Innocence	Innocence	Japan	June 23, 2024	65%
Sirocco and the Kingdom of the Winds	Sirocco et le Royaume des courants d'air	France-Belgium	August 11, 2024	100%
Dan Da Dan: First Encounter	Dandadan: Fāsuto Enkauntā	Japan	September 13, 2024	—N/a
Look Back (2024)	Rukku Bakku (2024)	Japan	October 4, 2024	100%
Ghost Cat Anzu	Bakeneko Anzu-chan	France-Japan	November 15, 2024	74%
A Silent Voice	Koe no Katachi	Japan	December 15, 2024	95%
The Colors Within	Kimi no Iro	Japan	January 24, 2025	92%
Mobile Suit Gundam GQuuuuuuX -Beginning-	Kidō Senshi Gandamu Jīkuakusu -Beginning-	Japan	February 28, 2025	—N/a
Witch Watch: Watch Party	Witchi Wotchi: Wotchi Pātī	Japan	March 16, 2025	—N/a
COLORFUL STAGE! The Movie: A Miku Who Can't Sing	Gekijōban Purojekuto Sekai: Kowareta Sekai to Utaenai Miku	Japan	April 17, 2025	—N/a
Wolf Children	Ōkami Kodomo no Ame to Yuki	Japan	May 11, 2025	95%
Dan Da Dan: Evil Eye	Dandadan: Jashi	Japan	June 6, 2025	—N/a
Jujutsu Kaisen: Hidden Inventory / Premature Death – The Movie	Jujutsu Kaisen: Kaigyoku / Gyokusetsu	Japan	July 16, 2025	—N/a
Shin Godzilla	Shin Gojira	Japan	August 14, 2025	87%
Love & Pop	Rabu & Poppu	Japan	September 1, 2025	—N/a
Your Name	Kimi no Na wa	Japan	September 1, 2025	98%
The Legend of Hei II	Luo Xiaohei Zhan Ji 2	China	September 5, 2025	—N/a
Linda Linda Linda	Rinda Rinda Rinda	Japan	September 5, 2025	88%
The Girl Who Leapt Through Time	Toki o Kakeru Shōjo	Japan	September 14, 2025	87%
100 Meters	Hyakuemu	Japan	October 10, 2025	100%
Evangelion: 1.11 You Are (Not) Alone	Evangerion Shin Gekijō-ban: Jo	Japan	October 21, 2025	63%
Evangelion: 2.22 You Can (Not) Advance	Evangerion Shin Gekijō-ban: Ha	Japan	October 21, 2025	82%
Little Amélie or the Character of Rain	Amélie et la Métaphysique des Tubes	France	October 31, 2025	97%
Kokuho	Kokuho	Japan	November 14, 2025	95%
Angel's Egg	Tenshi no Tamago	Japan	November 19, 2025	100%
Liz and the Blue Bird	Rizu to Aoi Tori	Japan	December 1, 2025	83%
Millennium Actress	Sennen Joyū	Japan	December 1, 2025	93%
Jujutsu Kaisen: Execution – Shibuya Incident x The Culling Game Begins	Jujutsu Kaisen: Shibuya Jihen x Shimetsu Kaiyū	Japan	December 5, 2025	67%
Lupin the IIIrd the Movie: The Immortal Bloodline	Lupin the IIIrd the Movie: Fujimi no Ketsuzoku	Japan	January 4, 2026	—N/a
All You Need Is Kill	All You Need Is Kill	Japan	January 16, 2026	81%
Hard Boiled	Lat Sau San Taam	Hong Kong	January 25, 2026	92%
Hypnosis Mic: Division Rap Battle – Interactive Movie	Hipunoshisu Maiku: Division Rap Battle – Interactive Movie	Japan	February 27, 2026	—N/a
A Better Tomorrow	Ying Hung Boon Sik	Hong Kong	March 1, 2026	95%
The Boy and the Beast	Bakemono no Ko	Japan	March 17, 2026	90%
Allegro non Troppo	Allegro non Troppo	Italy	March 27, 2026	89%
The Killer	Dip Huet Seung Hung	Hong Kong	April 5, 2026	96%
ChaO	ChaO	Japan	April 10, 2026	86%
Labyrinth	Meikyū no Shiori	Japan	May 10, 2026	20%
Decorado	Decorado	Portugal, Spain	May 15, 2026	89%
Tekkonkinkreet	Tekkonkinkurīto	Japan	May 31, 2026	79%
Another World	Another World	Hong Kong	June 5, 2026	87%
Adolescence of Utena	Shōjo Kakumei Utena: Aduresensu Mokushiroku	Japan	June 21, 2026	—N/a
The Last Blossom	Housenka	Japan	August 30, 2026	100%
Cocoon – One Summer of Girlhood	Cocoon – Aru Natsu no Shōjo-tachi Yori	Japan	September 4, 2026	—N/a
Shaun the Sheep: The Beast of Mossy Bottom	Shaun the Sheep: The Beast of Mossy Bottom	United Kingdom	September 18, 2026	99%
5 Centimeters per Second (2025)	Byōsoku Go Senchimētoru (2025)	Japan	October 23, 2026	—N/a
Godzilla Minus Zero	Gojira Mainasu Zero	Japan	November 6, 2026	90%
Look Back (2026)	Rukku Bakku (2026)	Japan	December 30, 2026	—N/a
Julián	Julián	Ireland, Canada, Denmark, Luxembourg, United Kingdom	March 26, 2027	93%
Vampire Hunter D: Bloodlust	Banpaia Hantā Dī	Japan	2027	71%
Sunny	Sunny	Japan	2029	—N/a
Allah Is Not Obliged	Allah N'est pas Obligé	France, Luxembourg, Belgium, Canada	TBA	—N/a

Some Studio Ghibli films currently theatrically distributed by GKIDS were distributed by Walt Disney Studios Motion Pictures for DVD and Blu-ray Disc. However, on July 17, 2017, GKIDS announced that they have acquired the home video rights for the entire Studio Ghibli catalog except Grave of the Fireflies, which the U.S. home video rights had been licensed under Sentai Filmworks, although GKIDS did own the U.S. theatrical rights to the film and would eventually acquire the home media rights with a Blu-ray and DVD release on July 8, 2025; and The Wind Rises, which GKIDS would eventually release digitally on September 1, 2020, and on Blu-ray and DVD on September 22, 2020.

The company also tours selections of short and feature films screened at NYICFF across the country. In mid-2009, the live-action features Tahaan and West of Pluto (À l'ouest de Pluton) were licensed for potential general releases but plans for both were dropped by late 2011 in favor of a focus on animation. GKIDS would eventually refocus on live-action films in 2025 with a limited screening of Love & Pop, as well as a nationwide screening for Shin Godzilla and Linda Linda Linda.

=== Studio Ghibli Fest ===
Since 2017, GKIDS has partnered with Fathom Events to host an annual yearlong event called Studio Ghibli Fest, which features limited theatrical screenings of select Studio Ghibli films in select AMC, Cinemark, Regal and other venues. The only year since inception without Ghibli Fest was 2020.

Studio Ghibli Fest 2017
My Neighbor Totoro	June 25, 26
Kiki's Delivery Service	July 23, 24
Castle in the Sky	August 27, 28
Nausicaä of the Valley of the Wind	September 24, 25
Spirited Away	October 29, 30
Howl's Moving Castle	November 26, 27

Studio Ghibli Fest 2018
Ponyo (10th Anniversary)	March 25, 26, 28
The Cat Returns	April 22, 23, 25
Porco Rosso	May 20, 21, 23
Pom Poko	June 17, 18, 20
Princess Mononoke	July 22, 23, 25
Grave of the Fireflies (30th Anniversary)	August 12, 13, 15
My Neighbor Totoro (30th Anniversary)	September 30, October 1, 3
Spirited Away	October 28, 29, 30
Castle in the Sky	November 18, 19, 20

Studio Ghibli Fest 2019
Howl's Moving Castle (15th Anniversary)	April 7, 8, 10
Nausicaä of the Valley of the Wind (35th Anniversary)	May 20, 21
Whisper of the Heart	July 1, 2
Kiki's Delivery Service (30th Anniversary)	July 28, 29, 31
My Neighbor Totoro	August 25, 26, 28
The Secret World of Arrietty	September 29, 30
Spirited Away	October 27, 28, 30
Princess Mononoke	November 17, 18, 20
The Tale of the Princess Kaguya	December 16, 18

Studio Ghibli Fest 2021
Spirited Away (20th Anniversary)	October 3, 4, 6
Howl's Moving Castle	October 24, 25, 28
Castle in the Sky (35th Anniversary)	November 14, 15, 18
My Neighbor Totoro	December 5, 6, 9

Studio Ghibli Fest 2022
Princess Mononoke (25th Anniversary)	April 3, 4, 6
Ponyo	May 15, 16, 18
The Cat Returns (20th Anniversary)	June 26, 27
Kiki's Delivery Service	July 31, August 1, 3
Only Yesterday	August 28, 29
Howl's Moving Castle	September 25, 26, 28
Spirited Away	October 30, November 1, 2

Studio Ghibli Fest 2023
My Neighbor Totoro (35th Anniversary)	March 25, 26, 27, 28, 29
Spirited Away: Live on Stage	April 23, 25, 27, May 2
Ponyo (15th Anniversary)	May 7, 8, 10
Kiki's Delivery Service	June 11, 12, 14
Nausicaä of the Valley of the Wind	July 9, 11
Castle in the Sky	July 10, 12
Princess Mononoke	August 5, 6, 7, 8, 9
Porco Rosso	August 20, 22
The Wind Rises (10th Anniversary)	August 21, 23
Howl's Moving Castle	September 23, 24, 25, 26, 27
Spirited Away	October 28, 29, 30, 31, November 1

Studio Ghibli Fest 2024
Spirited Away	April 27, 28, 29, 30, May 1
Nausicaä of the Valley of the Wind (40th Anniversary)	May 19, 21
Castle in the Sky	May 20, 22
The Secret World of Arrietty	June 9, 11
When Marnie Was There (10th Anniversary)	June 10, 12
Princess Mononoke	July 13, 14, 15, 16, 17
Ponyo	August 3, 4, 5, 6, 7
Whisper of the Heart	August 25, 27
The Cat Returns	August 26, 28
Howl's Moving Castle (20th Anniversary)	September 26, 27, 28, 29, 30, October 1, 2, 3
Kiki's Delivery Service (35th Anniversary)	October 26, 27, 28, 29, 30
Pom Poko (30th Anniversary)	November 24, 26
The Tale of the Princess Kaguya	November 25, 27
My Neighbor Totoro	December 7, 8, 9, 10, 11

Studio Ghibli Fest 2025
Kiki's Delivery Service	May 17, 18, 19, 20, 21
The Secret World of Arrietty (15th Anniversary)	June 22, 23, 24
My Neighbor Totoro	July 19, 20, 21, 22, 23
Grave of the Fireflies	August 10, 11, 12
Ponyo	August 23, 24, 25, 26, 27
Howl's Moving Castle	September 20, 21, 22, 23, 24
Spirited Away	October 18, 19, 20, 21, 22
The Boy and the Heron	November 15, 16, 17, 18, 19

Studio Ghibli Fest 2026
Ponyo	June 13, 14, 15, 16, 17
My Neighbor Totoro	July 11, 12, 13, 14, 15
Tales from Earthsea (20th Anniversary)	August 8, 10
Only Yesterday (35th Anniversary)	August 9, 11
Castle in the Sky (40th Anniversary)	August 22, 23, 24, 25, 26
Princess Mononoke	September 26, 27, 28, 29, 30
Spirited Away: Live on Stage	October 1, 8
Spirited Away (25th Anniversary)	October 17, 18, 19, 20, 21

== Television series distributed by GKIDS ==
US title	Original title	Country	US release
A Town Called Panic	Panique au Village	France-Belgium	December 19, 2017
Ronja, The Robber's Daughter	Sanzoku no Musume Rōnya	Japan	August 20, 2019
Future Boy Conan	Mirai Shōnen Konan	Japan	November 16, 2021
Neon Genesis Evangelion	Shinseiki Evangerion	Japan	December 8, 2021
"Deji" Meets Girl	Dēji Mītsu Gāru	Japan	June 3, 2022
Nadia: The Secret of Blue Water	Fushigi no Umi no Nadia	Japan	August 2, 2022
Arcane	Arcane	United States, France	September 24, 2024
Dandadan	Dandadan	Japan	October 4, 2024
Witch Watch	Witchi Wotchi	Japan	April 6, 2025
City the Animation	Shiti za Animēshon	Japan	December 15, 2026

== Awards and nominations ==
=== Academy Awards ===
Year	Nominee / work	Award	Result	Ref.
2009	The Secret of Kells	Best Animated Feature	Nominated	
2011	A Cat in Paris	Best Animated Feature	Nominated	
2011	Chico and Rita	Best Animated Feature	Nominated	
2013	Ernest & Celestine	Best Animated Feature	Nominated	
2014	Song of the Sea	Best Animated Feature	Nominated	
2014	The Tale of the Princess Kaguya	Best Animated Feature	Nominated	
2015	Boy and the World	Best Animated Feature	Nominated	
2015	When Marnie Was There	Best Animated Feature	Nominated	
2016	My Life as a Zucchini	Best Animated Feature	Nominated	
2017	The Breadwinner	Best Animated Feature	Nominated	
2017	Revolting Rhymes	Best Animated Short Film	Nominated	
2018	Mirai	Best Animated Feature	Nominated	
2020	Wolfwalkers	Best Animated Feature	Nominated	
2023	The Boy and the Heron	Best Animated Feature	Won	
2025	Little Amélie or the Character of Rain	Best Animated Feature	Nominated	
2025	Kokuho	Best Makeup and Hairstyling	Nominated	

=== Annie Award ===
Year	Nominee / work	Award	Result
2009	The Secret of Kells	Best Animated Feature	Nominated
2011	A Cat in Paris	Best Animated Feature	Nominated
2011	Chico and Rita	Best Animated Feature	Nominated
2011	Wrinkles	Best Animated Feature	Nominated
2012	The Rabbi's Cat	Best Animated Feature	Nominated
2013	Ernest & Celestine	Best Animated Feature	Nominated
2013	A Letter to Momo	Best Animated Feature	Nominated
2014	Song of the Sea	Best Animated Feature	Nominated
2014	The Tale of the Princess Kaguya	Best Animated Feature	Nominated
2015	Boy and the World	Best Animated Feature – Independent	Won
2015	The Prophet	Best Animated Feature – Independent	Nominated
2015	When Marnie Was There	Best Animated Feature – Independent	Nominated
2016	Miss Hokusai	Best Animated Feature – Independent	Nominated
2016	My Life as a Zucchini	Best Animated Feature – Independent	Nominated
2017	The Big Bad Fox and Other Tales...	Best Animated Feature – Independent	Nominated
2017	The Breadwinner	Best Animated Feature – Independent	Won
2017	Napping Princess	Best Animated Feature – Independent	Nominated
2018	MFKZ	Best Animated Feature – Independent	Nominated
2018	Mirai	Best Animated Feature – Independent	Won
2018	This Magnificent Cake!	Best Animated Feature – Independent	Nominated
2019	Buñuel in the Labyrinth of the Turtles	Best Animated Feature – Independent	Nominated
2019	Okko's Inn	Best Animated Feature – Independent	Nominated
2019	Promare	Best Animated Feature – Independent	Nominated
2019	Weathering with You	Best Animated Feature – Independent	Nominated
2020	On-Gaku: Our Sound	Best Animated Feature – Independent	Nominated
2020	Ride Your Wave	Best Animated Feature – Independent	Nominated
2020	Wolfwalkers	Best Animated Feature – Independent	Won
2021	Belle	Best Animated Feature – Independent	Nominated
2021	Fortune Favors Lady Nikuko	Best Animated Feature – Independent	Nominated
2021	Pompo the Cinephile	Best Animated Feature – Independent	Nominated
2022	Inu-Oh	Best Animated Feature – Independent	Nominated
2023	Ernest & Celestine: A Trip to Gibberitia	Best Animated Feature – Independent	Nominated
2023	The Boy and the Heron	Best Animated Feature	Nominated
2024	Chicken for Linda!	Best Animated Feature – Independent	Nominated
2024	Look Back (2024)	Best Animated Feature – Independent	Nominated
2024	Mars Express	Best Animated Feature – Independent	Nominated
2025	Little Amélie or the Character of Rain	Best Animated Feature	Nominated
