= Tito and the Birds =

2018 film directed by Gabriel Bitar, André Catoto

Tito and the Birds (Portuguese: Tito e os Pássaros) is a 2018 Brazilian animated film.

It was nominated for the Best Independent Animated Feature category at the 45th Annie Awards.

== Summary ==
The film is an eccentric but impassioned allegory about fear in Brazil affecting a boy named Tito who loves helping his scientist dad Rufus with his inventions (despite his worrisome skeptic mom); the latest involving a machine that can understand bird songs which break down thus resulting in separation. Years later, the fear epidemic is spreading and Tito must resist it relying on his friends Sarah and Buiú to find a cure for his father and his research for his machine before it's too late.

== Release ==
The film was released in Northern America on DVD and Blu-ray Disc by Shout Factory on April 23, 2019.

== See also ==
- Cinema of Brazil
- Independent animation
