= This Magnificent Cake! =

2018 Belgian animation film

- Theatrical release poster
- French: Ce magnifique gàteau !
- Directed by: Marc James Roels; Emma de Swaef
- Written by: Marc James Roels; Emma de Swaef
- Produced by: Steven de Beul; Ben Tesseur; Koen Vermaanen
- Cinematography: Marc James Roels
- Animation by: Iris Alexandre; Élodie Bonnaure; Andreas de Ridder; Mirjam Plettinx; Patricia Sourdes
- Production companies: Beast Animation; Vivement Lundi; Pedri Animation
- Distributed by: Cinemien; GKIDS
- Release date: May 14, 2018 (Cannes)
- Running time: 44 minutes
- Countries: Belgium; France; Netherlands
- Languages: French; Dutch

This Magnificent Cake! is a stop motion animated short film released in 2018, directed by Marc James Roels and Emma de Swaef. A coproduction of companies from Belgium, France and the Netherlands, the film centres on the history of Belgian colonialism in Africa.

The film premiered in the Directors' Fortnight program at the 2018 Cannes Film Festival.

== Cast ==
- Wim Willaert: Van Molle
- Paul Huvenne:
- Goua Grovogui: the lost carrier
- Sébastien Dewaele: Pierre
- Jan Decleir: the king
- Michel Kossi: Ota's brother
- Bruno Levie: Georges
- Gaston Motambo: Ota
- Alexander Rolies: Little Philippe
- Dirk Rypens: the soulful man on the boat
- Anna Schoonbroodt: mother
- Jamal Tahri: the angry neighbor
- Angelo Tijssens: Louis
- Aziz Azam, Sébastien Brodzic, Walter Canipel, Xavier Dumont, Michel Gallois, Michèle Hublau, Juan Maldonado and Céline Seutin : additional voices

== Awards ==
It won the André-Martin Prize for a French short film at the 2018 edition of the Annecy International Animation Film Festival, the Grand Prix at the 2018 Animafest Zagreb, the Grand Prize at the 2018 Ottawa International Animation Festival, and the National Grand Prix at the 2019 Clermont-Ferrand International Short Film Festival.

At the 2018 Toronto International Film Festival, it received an honorable mention for the Best International Short Film award.

It received a César Award nomination for Best Animated Short Film at the 45th César Awards in 2020.
