= The Magic Mountain (2015 film) =

- Film poster
- Directed by: Anca Damian
- Written by: Anca Damian; Anna Winkler
- Produced by: Anca Damian
- Edited by: Ion Ioachim Stroe
- Music by: Alexander Bălănescu
- Production companies: Aparte Film; Filmograf
- Distributed by: Aparte Film (Romania); Arizona Films (France)
- Release dates: 17 June 2015 (Annecy); 9 October 2015 (Romania); 23 December 2015 (France)
- Running time: 89 minutes
- Countries: Romania; Poland; France
- Languages: English; French

The Magic Mountain is a 2015 Romanian animated drama film directed by Anca Damian. It tells the story of Adam Jacek Winkler, a Polish anti-communist who in the 1980s fought against the Soviet Union in the Soviet–Afghan War, alongside Ahmad Shah Massoud. The film was co-produced with French and Polish companies. It was made using a mix of animation techniques and Winkler's personal photographs, sketches and film footage. The English-language version of the film stars Jean-Marc Barr as the voice of Winkler.

== Cast ==
- Jean-Marc Barr as Adam Jacek Winkler (English version)
- Christophe Miossec as Adam Jacek Winkler (French version)
- Lizzie Brocheré as Anna Winkler

== Reception ==
Boyd van Hoeij of The Hollywood Reporter found the early parts of the film, before Winkler reaches Afghanistan, to be messy and too light on facts. He also found the mixed technique problematic: "While this approach shows off the versatility of Damian in different media and visually suggests something of the protagonist's agitation and anarchic streak, this choice works against the film because the narrative itself is also restless and somewhat haphazard, at least for the film's first half." Hoeij wrote that Winkler's "emotional journey or journeys are never quite made tangible".

The film received a Special Jury Mention at the 2015 Karlovy Vary International Film Festival. Damian envisions the film as the second part in a trilogy about heroism, after Crulic: The Path to Beyond from 2011.

In 2015, he obtained the prize ANIMAFICX section of the 53rd International Festival of Gijon.

In 2016, the film won Grand Prix - Best Feature Film award at the 26th edition of Animafest Zagreb - World Festival of Animated Film Zagreb, and the Eurimages Audentia Award at the International Istanbul Film Festival.
