= Tram (film) =

- Film poster
- Tramvaj
- Directed by: Michaela Pavlátová
- Produced by: Ron Dyens; Pavel Strnad
- Music by: Petr Marek
- Distributed by: Canal+
- Release date: May 2012 (Cannes)
- Running time: 8 minutes
- Country: Czech Republic

Tram (Czech: Tramvaj) is a 2012 Czech short animated film directed by Michaela Pavlátová about the conductress of a tram and her sexual fantasies on it.

== Premiere ==
The film premiered at the 2012 Cannes Film Festival. It won the Annecy Cristal in 2012.
