= Yobi, the Five Tailed Fox =

- Theatrical poster
- Hangul: 천년여우 여우비
- Hanja: 千年여우 여우비
- RR: Cheonnyeonyeou yeoubi
- MR: Ch'ŏnnyŏnyŏu yŏubi
- Directed by: Lee Sung-gang
- Written by: Lee Sung-gang
- Produced by: Kang Han-young; Oh Min-ho
- Starring: Son Ye-jin; Ryu Deok-hwan; Gong Hyung-jin
- Music by: Yang Bang-ean; Ryo Kunihiko
- Production companies: Sunwoo Entertainment; Yellow Film; Korean Film Council
- Distributed by: CJ Entertainment
- Release date: January 25, 2007
- Running time: 85 minutes
- Country: South Korea
- Language: Korean
- Box office: US$2.3 million

Yobi, the Five Tailed Fox (Korean: 천년여우 여우비) is a 2007 animated South Korean film by Lee Sung-gang, the director of My Beautiful Girl, Mari. The film loosely draws upon the Korean folk tales of the kumiho.

== Story ==
One hundred years ago, aliens landed on a mountain near where a small, white five tailed fox lived. After being stranded on Earth for one hundred years, they are ready for a test flight to see if they can return home. The test fails as one of the aliens makes a mistake, and the other aliens tell him to leave.

The runaway alien finds itself taken in by a class of students at the foot of the mountain. There, a teacher named Kang trains students who do not fit in at a regular school. In order to save the alien, the five tailed fox takes on the form of a human girl, and joins the school under the name of Yobi.

Staying at the school, Yobi becomes friends with one of the students, a boy named Geum-ee. She grows more and more attached to humans and enjoys her time with them, until a fox hunter appears, as well as a shadow detective named Mr. Shadow who gives Yobi a device which will allow her to become human by taking the soul from a human.

Yobi becomes exposed to the hunter, which makes her leave. With the fox hunter set upon hunting her down, Geum-ee tries to save her, but falls down in a lake which makes Geum-ee's soul trapped in a cage as a bird. Yobi tries to save him, but Mr. Shadow takes Geum-ee's soul. He states that his soul was taken from him long ago and that he needs one to become solid. Yobi defeats the shadow, grabbing the soul from his core whilst getting attacked in the soul lake.

Since they fell into the soul lake, Geum-ee crosses the dimension only to be told by the soul lake's gatekeepers that the number of souls in the lake must remain the same, and a soul can never go out unless another soul replaces it. Yobi then allows for Geum-ee's departure back to the human world by placing her own soul in the bird cage. Once he comes back to consciousness, Geum-ee tries to call for Yobi, but to no avail. He is last seen leaving with the teacher and the other students.

Some time later, Yobi's soul is released. Yobi becomes human and is most likely reincarnated to become human not too long after her soul had been exchanged. It is unknown if Yobi and Geum-ee see each other again or not.

== Cast ==
Character	Korean voice actor	English voice actor
Yobi	Son Ye-jin	
Hwang Geum-ee	Ryu Deok-hwan	
Joo-Hee	Choi Do-yeong	
Jung Jong-ee / Jung-Wook / News Anchor / Jong's Mother	Jeong Ok-joo	
Kang Han-moo	Gong Hyung-jin	
The Fox Hunter / Village Headman	Lee Jong-goo	
Mr. Shadow / Captain Yo / Policeman	Kim So-hyeong	
Forest Spirit / Ju Hye-Seung	Lee Hyang-sook	
Naughty Yo / Saeng-Kee / Sung-Chan	Lee Hyun-joo	
Jumbo Yo / News Reporter / Jong's Father / Tae Soo	Sa Seong-ung	
Chubby Yo / Sambaba / Reporter / Policeman / News Anchor	Seo Yun-seok	
Hairy Yo / Sambaba	Choi Moon-ja	
Tiny Yo / Jung-Won	Lee Sun-ho	
Sambaba / Jung Woo / Min Ho / Nurse	Chae Eui-jin	

== See also ==
- Foxes in popular culture, films and literature
