= Annecy International Animation Film Festival =

Annual film festival in Annecy, France

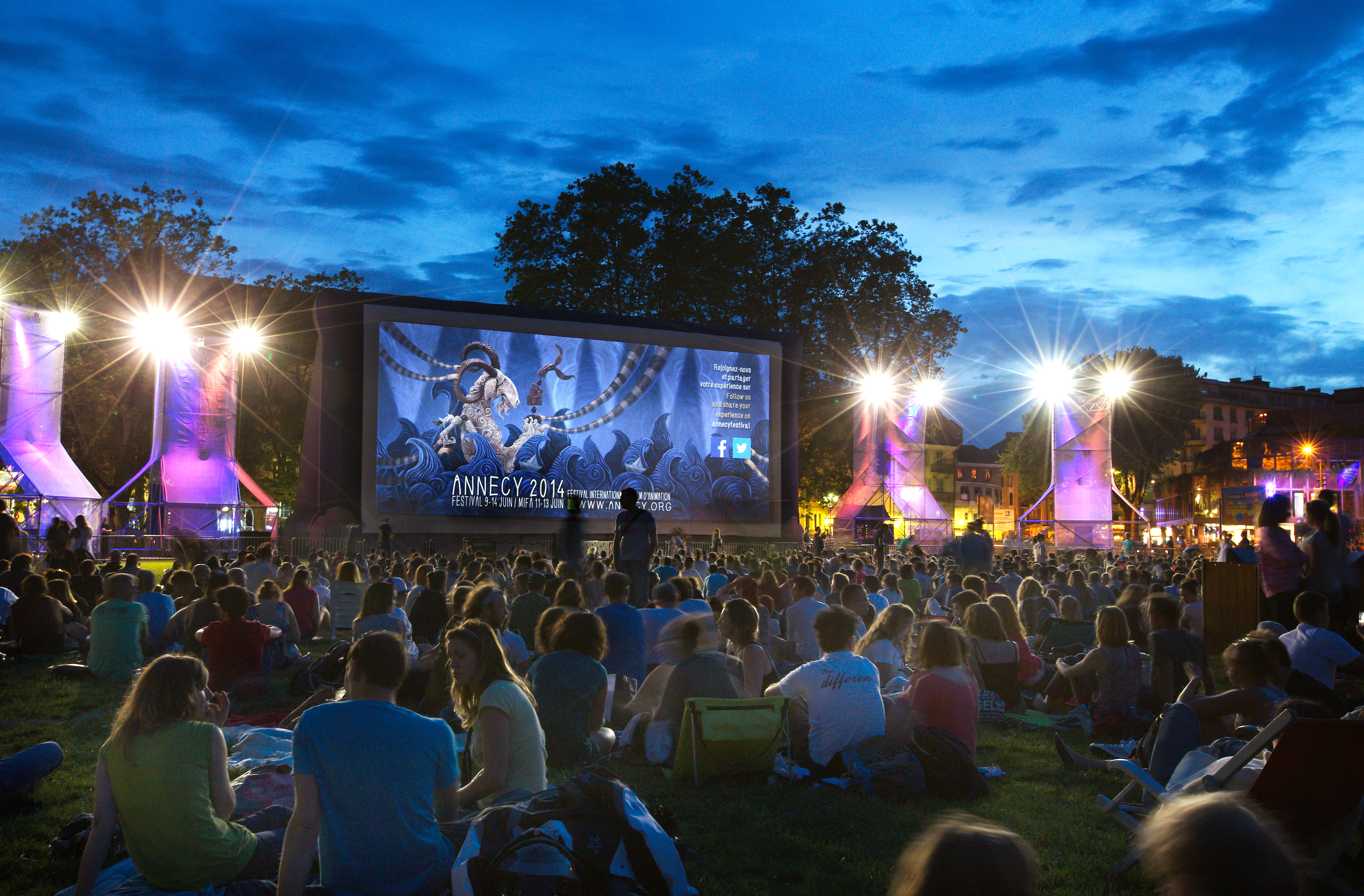
- Annecy outdoor projection, 2014
- Location: Annecy, France
- Founded: 7 June 1960; 66 years ago
- Most recent: 2026
- Directors: Mickaël Marin
- Language: International
- Website: www.annecyfestival.com

The Annecy International Animation Film Festival (French: Festival international du film d'animation d'Annecy, officially abbreviated in English as the Annecy Festival, or simply Annecy) was created in 1960 and takes place at the beginning of June in the city of Annecy, France. Initially occurring every two years, the festival became an annual event in 1998.

== History ==
In the 1960s, the existence of a very active film club in the Savoy region, combined with the encounters of its organizers with the team from the Journées du Cinéma (Cinema Days), facilitated the establishment of the Journées Internationales du Cinéma d'Animation (JICA) in Annecy. Pierre Barbin, André Martin, and Michel Boschet were the founding members. In 1956, the directors of the Savoy film club, who were attending the first edition of the JICA alongside the Cannes Film Festival, realized that the big festival wasn't working because film stars monopolized the attention of the public and journalists. The meeting between the two teams gave rise to the idea of establishing an animation festival in Annecy.

In 1968, the festival, like many others that year, was interrupted by the May 68. In 1971, discussions took place between the organizers and the International Animated Film Association (ASIFA) regarding the method of selecting the films presented. Until 1975, the Festival experienced a sharp increase in attendance, both among professionals and foreign delegations, subscribers and spectators. The arrival of the first images produced using computers created a split between conventional artists and those who were in favor of these new techniques.

In the 1980s, the festival popularized by the audiences included Hungarian animator József Gémes' Heroic Times, which won the first feature film award in 1985. At the same year, the first edition of the International Animation Film Market (MIFA) was organized concurrently, with a complementary role. American studios became increasingly visible at the event, notably with a public screening of a program of 9 Oscar-winning Disney films, with a tribute to Warner Bros. Animation in 1987, and with the reception of a large delegation from Walt Disney Pictures for the first time in 1989. Between 1983 and 1997, the number of participants increased from 900 accredited in 1983 to 4,300 in 1997 and the number of films received from 386 to 1,271. These factors led to increasingly significant media coverage, with nearly 300 journalists present at the end of the 1990s. From 1983, the success of the event led to an increase in the number of professionals with a cultural or economic orientation.

In the 2000s, the Annecy Festival was booming, with preview screenings multiplying, leading to greater media coverage of the event. France and Europe began producing animated films as well in Japan, South Korea, the United States, Canada, Latin America, etc.

In 2006, the Cité de l'Image en Mouvement (CITIA) was created. Its project revolved around three pillars (culture, economy, and training), and various initiatives were implemented at the local level: a permanent exhibition on animated cinema, the development of arts education programs, the establishment of higher education programs with the Gobelins Film School, the creation of an event dedicated to content and new media, the White Forum, and the establishment of a fund to support the production of digital works.

At the end of the 2012 edition of the festival, Marcel Jean was appointed artistic delegate. He succeeded Serge Bromberg, who had held the position since 1999. In 2015, he decided to honor women and formed an all-female jury, dedicating numerous heritage programs to women directors who have made their mark on history. He created new competitive sections with the aim of promoting the presence of all kinds of films in the selection. This led to the creation of the short film sections Off Limits (2014), Perspectives (2017), and Young Audiences (2017), as well as a second competitive section dedicated to feature films, called Contrechamp (2019).

The 60th edition, initially scheduled for 15–19 June 2020, was canceled on 7 April due to the COVID-19 pandemic, and the 61st edition were held on 14–19 June 2021.

Director Steve Martino expressed his admiration of the festival in the Hollywood Reporter, saying, “For one week in June, the city of Annecy transforms into this amazing melting pot that celebrates all styles and techniques of animation. We can't think of a better place to debut our process and research that went into the making of the film.”

== Features ==
The festival is a competition between animated films of various techniques (traditional, cut-outs, claymation, CGI, etc.) classified in various categories:

- Feature films
- Short films
- Films produced for television and advertising
- Student films
- Films made for the internet (since 2002)
- Feature films contrechamp in competition (since 2007)

Throughout the festival, in addition to the competing films projected in various cinemas of the city, an open-air night projection is organized on Pâquier, in the centre of the town, amongst the lake and with the mountains. According to the topic of the festival, classic or recent films are projected upon the giant screen. On Saturday evening, all the award winners are presented.

== Award winners ==
=== Feature films in competition ===
Year	English title	Original title	Director(s)	Countrie(s)
1985	Heroic Times	Daliás idők	József Gémes	Hungary
1985	Gwen, or the Book of Sand	Gwen, ou le livre de sable	Jean-François Laguionie	France
1985	The Invisible Child	L'Enfant invisible	André Lindon	France
1985	The Soldier's Tale		R.O. Blechman	United States
1985	The Wind in the Willows		Arthur Rankin Jr. and Jules Bass	United States
1987	When the Wind Blows		Jimmy Murakami	United Kingdom
1987	The Monkey King Conquers the Demon	金猴降妖	Te Wei, Yan Dingxian, and Lin Wenxiao	China
1987	The Adventures of Mark Twain		Will Vinton	United States
1987	The Pied Piper	Krysař	Jiří Barta	Czechoslovakia; West Germany
1987	Valhalla		Peter Madsen and Jeffrey J. Varab	Denmark
1989	Alice	Něco z Alenky	Jan Švankmajer	Czechoslovakia; Switzerland; West Germany; United Kingdom
1989	Akira		Katsuhiro Otomo	Japan
1989	Gandahar	Gandahar, les Années lumière	René Laloux	France
1989	Papobo		Juan Alea	Cuba
1989	The Land Before Time		Don Bluth	United States; Ireland
1991	Robinson & Co.	Robinson et compagnie	Jacques Colombat	France
1991	Little Nemo: Adventures in Slumberland		Masami Hata and William Hurtz	Japan; United States
1991	The Journey to Melonia	Resan till Melonia	Per Åhlin	Sweden; Norway
1991	The School of Fine Arts – Part 2	Школа Изящных Искусств (Shkola Izyashchnykh Iskusstv)	Andrei Khrjanovsky	USSR
1991	War of the Birds	Fuglekrigen i Kanøfleskoven	Jannik Hastrup	Denmark
1993	Porco Rosso	紅の豚	Hayao Miyazaki	Japan
1993	The Flying Sneaker	Motýlí cas	Břetislav Pojar	Czech Republic
1993	The Tune		Bill Plympton	United States
1993	Under Milk Wood		Les Orton	United Kingdom
1995	Pom Poko	平成狸合戦ぽんぽこ	Isao Takahata	Japan
1995	Close to You		Maciek Albrecht	United States
1995	Hugo, the Jungle Creature	Jungledyret Hugo	Stefan Fjeldmark and Flemming Quist Møller	Denmark
1995	The Hero of Two Worlds	L'eroe dei due mondi	Guido Manuli	Italy
1997	James and the Giant Peach		Henry Selick	United Kingdom; United States
1997	Beavis and Butt-Head Do America		Mike Judge and Yvette Kaplan	United States
1997	How the Toys Saved Christmas	La freccia azzurra	Enzo D'Alò	Italy
1997	Joe's Apartment		John Payson	United States
1997	The Real Shliem	Die Schelme von Schelm	Hanan Kaminski	Germany
1997	Werner: Eat My Dust!!!	Werner – Das muß kesseln!!!	Michael Schaack	Germany
1998	I Married a Strange Person!		Bill Plympton	United States
1998	H.C. Andersen's The Long Shadow	H.C. Andersen Og Den Skæve Skygge	Jannik Hastrup	Denmark
1998	Peccato		Manuel Gómez	Belgium
1998	Pippi Longstocking		Clive A. Smith	Sweden; Germany; Canada
1998	The Hunt for the Key to Heaven	Jakten på himlens nyckel	Karl Gunnar Holmqvist	Sweden
1999	Kirikou and the Sorceress	Kirikou et la sorcière	Michel Ocelot	France; Belgium; Luxembourg
1999	Gurin with the Foxtail	Solan, Ludvig og Gurin med reverompa	John M. Jacobsen and Nille Tystad	Norway
1999	Jin-Roh: The Wolf Brigade	人狼	Hiroyuki Okiura	Japan
1999	Lucky and Zorba	La gabbianella e il gatto	Enzo D'Alò	Italy
1999	The Rugrats Movie		Igor Kovalyov and Norton Virgien	United States
2000	The 2000 prize was declared void, due to technical and economic problems.			
2000	Adolescence of Utena	少女革命ウテナ アドゥレセンス黙示録	Kunihiko Ikuhara	Japan
2000	Optimus Mundus		Vladimir Golovanov and Oleg Yegorov	Russia
2000	Pettson and Findus	Pettson och Findus – Kattonauten	Torbjörn Hansson and Hanan Kaminski	Sweden
2000	The Miracle Maker		Derek Hayes and Stanislav Sokolov	United Kingdom; Russia
2001	Mutant Aliens		Bill Plympton	United States
2001	Blood: The Last Vampire		Hiroyuki Kitakubo	Japan
2001	Help! I'm a Fish	Hjælp, jeg er en fisk	Stefan Fjeldmark and Michael Hegner	Denmark; Germany; Ireland
2001	The Dog Hotel	Hundhotellet – En mystisk historia	Per Åhlin	Sweden; Denmark; Norway
2002	My Beautiful Girl, Mari	마리 이야기	Lee Sung-gang	South Korea
2002	Mercano the Martian	Mercano el marciano	Juan Antín	Argentina
2002	Metropolis	メトロポリス	Rintaro	Japan
2002	Momo	Momo alla conquista del tempo	Enzo D'Alò	Italy; France; Germany; United Kingdom
2002	Tristan and Isolde	Tristan et Iseut	Thierry Schiel	Luxembourg; France
2003	My Life as McDull	麥兜故事	Brian Tse and Tou Yuen	Hong Kong
2003	Kaena: The Prophecy	Kaena, la Prophétie	Chris Delaporte and Pascal Pinon	France; Canada
2003	The Boy Who Wanted to Be a Bear	Drengen der ville gøre det umulige	Jannik Hastrup	Denmark
2003	The Egg	L'uovo	Dario Picciau	Italy
2003	The Legend of the Sky Kingdom		Roger Hawkins	Zimbabwe
2004	Oseam	오세암	Sung Baek-yeop	South Korea
2004	El Cid: The Legend	El Cid: La leyenda	José Pozo	Spain
2004	Hair High		Bill Plympton	United States
2004	Pinocchio 3000		Daniel "Donald" Robichaud	Canada; France; Germany; Italy; Portugal; Spain
2004	Totò Sapore and the Magic Story of Pizza	Totò Sapore e la magica storia della pizza	Maurizio Forestieri	Italy
2005	The District!	Nyócker!	Áron Gauder	Hungary
2005	Alosha	Алеша Попович и Тугарин Змей	Konstantin Bronzin	Russia
2005	Among the Thorns	Bland tistlar	Uzi Geffenblad and Lotta Geffenblad	Sweden
2005	Frank & Wendy		Kaspar Jancis, Ülo Pikkov and Priit Tender	Estonia
2005	Terkel in Trouble	Terkel i knibe	Thorbjørn Christoffersen and Stefan Fjeldmark	Denmark
2006	Renaissance		Christian Volckman	France; United Kingdom; Luxembourg
2006	Asterix and the Vikings	Astérix et les Vikings	Stefan Fjeldmark and Jesper Møller	France; Denmark
2006	Origin: Spirits of the Past	銀色の髪のアギト	Keiichi Sugiyama	Japan
2006	Wallace & Gromit: The Curse of the Were-Rabbit		Nick Park and Steve Box	United Kingdom; United States
2006	xxxHolic: A Midsummer Night's Dream	劇場版 ×××HOLiC 真夏ノ夜ノ夢	Tsutomu Mizushima	Japan
2007	Free Jimmy	Slipp Jimmy fri	Christopher Nielsen	Norway; United Kingdom
2007	Azur & Asmar: The Princes' Quest	Azur et Asmar	Michel Ocelot	France; Belgium; Spain; Italy
2007	Brave Story	ブレイブ・ストーリー	Koichi Chigira	Japan
2007	Film Noir		Srđa Penezić and Risto Topaloski	Serbia
2007	Flushed Away		David Bowers and Sam Fell	United Kingdom; United States
2007	Max & Co		Frédéric Guillaume and Sam Guillaume	Switzerland; France; Belgium; United Kingdom
2007	Paprika	パプリカ	Satoshi Kon	Japan
2007	The Blue Elephant	ก้านกล้วย	Kompin Kemgumnird	Thailand
2007	The Girl Who Leapt Through Time	時をかける少女	Mamoru Hosoda	Japan
2008	Sita Sings the Blues		Nina Paley	United States
2008	Appleseed: Ex Machina	エクスマキナ	Shinji Aramaki	Japan; United States
2008	Dragon Hunters	Chasseurs de dragons	Guillaume Ivernel and Arthur Qwak	France; Luxembourg; Germany
2008	Fear[s] of the Dark	Peur[s] du noir	Christian "Blutch" Hincker, Charles Burns, Marie Caillou, Pierre di Sciullo, Lorenzo Mattotti, and Richard McGuire	France
2008	Go West! A Lucky Luke Adventure	Tous à l'Ouest, une aventure de Lucky Luke	Olivier Jean-Marie	France
2008	Idiots and Angels		Bill Plympton	United States
2008	Nocturna	Nocturna, una aventura mágica	Adrià García and Víctor Maldonado	Spain; France
2008	The Perfect World of Kai	ピアノの森	Masayuki Kojima	Japan
2008	The Three Robbers	Die drei Räuber	Hayo Freitag	Germany
2009	Coraline		Henry Selick	United States
2009	Mary and Max		Adam Elliot	Australia
2009	Battle for Terra		Aristomenis Tsirbas	United States
2009	Boogie	Boogie, el aceitoso	Gustavo Cova	Argentina
2009	Kurt Turns Evil	Kurt blir grusom	Rasmus Sivertson	Norway
2009	Monsters vs. Aliens		Rob Letterman and Conrad Vernon	United States
2009	My Dog Tulip		Paul Fierlinger and Sandra Fierlinger	United States; United Kingdom
2009	The Secret of Kells		Tomm Moore and Nora Twomey	Ireland; France; Belgium
2009	The Story of Mr. Sorry	제불찰씨 이야기	Kim Il-hyun, Kwak In-keun and Ryu Ji-na	South Korea
2010	Fantastic Mr. Fox		Wes Anderson	United States
2010	Eleanor's Secret	Kérity, la Maison des contes	Dominique Monféry	France; Italy
2010	Metropia		Tarik Saleh	Sweden; Denmark; Norway
2010	One Piece Film: Strong World		Munehisa Sakai	Japan
2010	Piercing I	刺痛我	Liu Jian	China
2010	Summer Wars	サマーウォーズ	Mamoru Hosoda	Japan
2010	The Storytelling Show	Allez raconte!	Jean-Christophe Roger	France; Luxembourg
2011	The Rabbi's Cat	Le Chat du rabbin	Joann Sfar and Antoine Delesvaux	France
2011	A Cat in Paris	Une vie de chat	Jean-Loup Felicioli and Alain Gagnol	France; Netherlands; Switzerland; Belgium
2011	Chico & Rita		Javier Mariscal and Fernando Trueba	Spain; United Kingdom; France; Canada
2011	Colorful	カラフル	Keiichi Hara	Japan
2011	Green Days: Dinosaur and I	소중한 날의 꿈	An Jae-hoon and Han Hye-jin	South Korea
2011	Ray Harryhausen: Special Effects Titan		Gilles Penso	United Kingdom; France
2011	Santa's Apprentice	L'Apprenti Père Noël	Luc Vinciguerra	France; Australia
2011	The Great Bear	Den Kaempestore Bjorn	Esben Toft Jacobsen	Denmark
2011	The House	집	Ban Ju-young, Park Mi-sun and Park Eun-young	South Korea
2011	The Tibetan Dog	チベット犬物語	Masayuki Kojima	China; Japan
2012	Crulic: The Path to Beyond	Crulic – drumul spre dincolo	Anca Damian	Poland; Romania
2012	Approved for Adoption	Couleur de peau: miel	Laurent Boileau and Jung Henin	France; Belgium; South Korea; Switzerland
2012	Asura	アシュラ	Keiichi Sato	Japan
2012	Children Who Chase Lost Voices	星を追う子ども	Makoto Shinkai	Japan
2012	ParaNorman		Chris Butler and Sam Fell	United States
2012	Ronal the Barbarian	Ronal Barbaren	Thorbjørn Christoffersen and Kresten Vestbjerg	Denmark
2012	Tad, the Lost Explorer	Las aventuras de Tadeo Jones	Enrique Gato	Spain
2012	The Dearest	은실이	Kim Sun-ah and Park See-he	South Korea
2012	The Nature of Frédéric Back	Frédéric Back, Grande Nature	Phil Comeau	Canada
2012	The Painting	Le Tableau	Jean-François Laguionie	France; Belgium
2012	Wrinkles	Arrugas	Ignacio Ferreras	Spain
2012	Zarafa		Rémi Bezançon and Jean-Christoph Lie	France; Belgium
2013	Rio 2096: A Story of Love and Fury	Uma História de Amor e Fúria	Luiz Bolognesi	Brazil
2013	Arjun: The Warrior Prince		Arnab Chaudhuri	India
2013	Berserk: The Golden Age Arc II – The Battle for Doldrey	ベルセルク 黄金時代篇II ドルドレイ攻略	Toshiyuki Kubooka	Japan
2013	Epic		Chris Wedge	United States
2013	Jack and the Cuckoo-Clock Heart	Jack et la Mécanique du cœur	Stéphane Berla and Mathias Malzieu	France
2013	Jasmine		Alain Ughetto	France
2013	Khumba		Anthony Silverston	South Africa
2013	Legends of Oz: Dorothy's Return		Will Finn and Dan St. Pierre	United States
2013	My Mommy is in America and She Met Buffalo Bill	Ma Maman est en Amérique, elle a rencontré Buffalo Bill	Marc Boréal and Thibaut Chatel	France
2013	Pinocchio		Enzo D'Alò	Italy; France; Belgium; Luxembourg
2013	The Apostle	O Apóstolo	Fernando Cortizo	Spain
2014	Boy and the World	O Menino e o Mundo	Alê Abreu	Brazil
2014	Asphalt Watches		Shayne Ehman and Seth Scriver	Canada
2014	Cheatin'		Bill Plympton	United States
2014	Giovanni's Island	ジョバンニの島	Mizuho Nishikubo	Japan
2014	The Art of Happiness	L'arte della felicità	Alessandro Rak	Italy
2014	Last Hijack		Femke Wolting and Tommy Pallotta	Germany
2014	Lisa Limone and Maroc Orange: A Rapid Love Story	Lisa Limone ja Maroc Orange, tormakas armulugu	Mait Laas	Estonia
2014	Minuscule: Valley of the Lost Ants	Minuscule: La Vallée des fourmis perdues	Hélène Giraud and Thomas Szabo	France; Belgium
2014	The Fake	사이비	Yeon Sang-ho	South Korea
2015	April and the Extraordinary World	Avril et le Monde Truqué	Christian Desmares and Franck Ekinci	France; Belgium; Canada
2015	Adama		Simon Rouby	France
2015	Mune: Guardian of the Moon	Mune, le Gardien de la Lune	Alexandre Heboyan and Benoît Philippon	France
2015	Possessed	Pos eso	Samuel Ortí Martí	Spain
2015	Sabogal		Juan José Lozano and Sergio Mejía Forero	Colombia
2015	Miss Hokusai	百日紅 〜Miss HOKUSAI〜	Keiichi Hara	Japan
2015	The Case of Hana & Alice	花とアリス殺人事件	Shunji Iwai	Japan
2015	Long Way North	Tout en haut du monde	Rémi Chayé	France; Denmark
2016	My Life as a Zucchini	Ma vie de courgette	Claude Barras	France; Switzerland
2016	25 April		Leanne Pooley	New Zealand
2016	Blinky Bill the Movie		Deane Taylor	Australia; United Kingdom
2016	Snowtime!	La Guerre des tuques 3D	Jean-François Pouliot and François Brisson	Canada
2016	The Girl Without Hands	La Jeune Fille sans mains	Sébastien Laudenbach	France
2016	Nuts!		Penny Lane	United States
2016	Birdboy: The Forgotten Children	Psiconautas, los niños olvidados	Pedro Rivero and Alberto Vázquez	Spain; France
2016	Seoul Station	서울역	Yeon Sang-ho	South Korea
2016	Sheep and Wolves	Волки и овцы: бееезумное превращение	Maxim Volkov	Russia
2016	Window Horses		Ann Marie Fleming	Canada
2017	Lu over the Wall	夜明け告げるルーのうた	Masaaki Yuasa	Japan
2017	Loving Vincent		Dorota Kobiela and Hugh Welchman	Poland; United Kingdom
2017	In This Corner of the World	この世界の片隅に	Sunao Katabuchi	Japan
2017	A Silent Voice: The Movie	映画 聲の形	Naoko Yamada	Japan
2017	Animal Crackers		Scott Christian Sava and Tony Bancroft	United States; China
2017	Big Fish & Begonia	大鱼海棠	Liang Xuan and Zhang Chun	China
2017	Ethel & Ernest		Roger Mainwood	United Kingdom
2017	Tehran Taboo	تهران تابو	Ali Soozandeh	Austria; Germany
2017	Zombillenium	Zombillénium	Arthur de Pins and Alexis Ducord	France; Belgium
2018	Funan		Denis Do	France; Luxembourg; Belgium
2018	The Breadwinner		Nora Twomey	Canada; Ireland; Luxembourg
2018	Cinderella the Cat	Gatta Cenerentola	Alessandro Rak, Ivan Cappiello, Marino Guarnieri and Dario Sansone	Italy
2018	The Wolf House	La casa lobo	Cristobal León & Joaquín Cociña	Chile; Germany
2018	Mirai	未来のミライ	Mamoru Hosoda	Japan
2018	Seder-Masochism		Nina Paley	United States
2018	Tito and the Birds	Tito e os Pássaros	Gabriel Bitar, André Catoto and Gustavo Steinberg	Brazil
2018	Virus Tropical		Santiago Caicedo	Colombia; Ecuador
2018	Okko's Inn	若おかみは小学生!	Kitaro Kosaka	Japan
2018	Wall		Cam Christiansen	Canada
2019	I Lost My Body	J'ai perdu mon corps	Jérémy Clapin	France
2019	Buñuel in the Labyrinth of the Turtles	Buñuel en el laberinto de las tortugas	Salvador Simó	Spain
2019	Marona's Fantastic Tale	L'Extraordinaire Voyage de Marona	Anca Damian	France
2019	The Bears' Famous Invasion of Sicily	La famosa invasione degli orsi in Sicilia; La Fameuse Invasion des ours en Sicile	Lorenzo Mattotti	Italy; France
2019	The Swallows of Kabul	Les Hirondelles de Kaboul	Zabou Breitman and Eléa Gobé Mévellec	France; Switzerland; Luxembourg
2019	Promare	プロメア	Hiroyuki Imaishi	Japan
2019	Ride Your Wave	きみと、波にのれたら	Masaaki Yuasa	Japan
2019	The Relative Worlds	あした世界が終わるとしても	Yūhei Sakuragi	Japan
2019	Checkered Ninja	Ternet Ninja	Anders Matthesen and Thorbjørn Christoffersen	Denmark
2019	White Snake	白蛇：缘起	Amp Wong and Zhao Ji	China; United States
2019	The Wonderland	バースデー・ワンダーランド	Keiichi Hara	Japan
2019	Zero Impunity		Nicolas Blies, Stéphane Hueber-Blies and Denis Lambert	France; Luxembourg
2020	Calamity, a Childhood of Martha Jane Cannary	Calamity, une enfance de Martha Jane Cannary	Rémi Chayé	France; Denmark
2020	Bigfoot Family		Ben Stassen and Jeremy Degruson	Belgium; France
2020	Ginger's Tale	Огонек-Огниво	Konstantin Schchekin	Russia
2020	Hello World		Tomohiko Ito	Japan
2020	Jungle Beat: The Movie		Brent Dawes	Mauritius; South Africa
2020	Kill It and Leave This Town	Zabij to i wyjedź z tego miasta	Mariusz Wilczyński	Poland
2020	Lupin III: The First	ルパン三世 THE FIRST	Takashi Yamazaki	Japan
2020	Nahuel and the Magic Book	Nahuel y el Libro Mágico	Germán Acuña	Chile; Brazil
2020	Seven Days War	ぼくらの7日間戦争	Yūta Murano	Japan
2020	Little Vampire	Petit Vampire	Joann Sfar	France
2020	The Nose, or the Conspiracy of Mavericks	Нос, или Заговор «не таких»	Andrey Khrzhanovskiy	Russia
2021	Flee		Jonas Poher Rasmussen	United Kingdom; United States; Denmark; France; Norway; Sweden
2021	Hayop Ka! The Nimfa Dimaano Story		Avid Liongoren	Philippines
2021	Jiang Ziya	姜子牙	Cheng Teng and Li Wei	China
2021	Josee, the Tiger and the Fish	ジョゼと虎と魚たち	Kotaro Tamura	Japan
2021	The Crossing	La Traversée	Florence Miailhe	Germany; France; Czech Republic
2021	Lamya's Poem		Alex Kronemer	Canada; United States
2021	My Sunny Maad	Ma Famille Afghane	Michaela Pavlátová	Czech Republic; France; Slovakia
2021	Poupelle of Chimney Town	映画 えんとつ町のプペル	Yusuke Hirota	Japan
2021	Snotty Boy	Rotzbub	Marcus H. Rosenmüller and Santiago Lopez Jover	Austria; Germany
2021	The Ape Star		Linda Hambäck	Sweden; Norway; Denmark
2021	The Deer King	鹿の王 ユナと約束の旅	Masashi Ando and Masayuki Miyaji	Japan
2022	Little Nicholas: Happy As Can Be	Le Petit Nicolas – Qu'est-ce qu'on attend pour être heureux?	Amandine Fredon and Benjamin Massoubre	France; Luxembourg
2022	Blind Willow, Sleeping Woman	Saules aveugles, femme endormie	Pierre Foldes	Canada; France; Luxembourg; Germany
2022	Charlotte		Eric Warin and Tahir Rana	Canada; France; Belgium; United Kingdom
2022	No Dogs or Italians Allowed	Interdit aux chiens et aux Italiens	Alain Ughetto	Italy; France
2022	Goodbye, Don Glees!	グッバイ、ドン・グリーズ!	Atsuko Ishizuka	Japan; Canada; United States
2022	The House of the Lost on the Cape	岬のマヨイガ	Shinya Kawatsura	Japan
2022	The Island	L'Île	Anca Damian	Romania; France; Belgium
2022	My Love Affair with Marriage		Signe Baumane	Latvia; United States; Luxembourg
2022	Nayola		José Miguel Ribeiro	Portugal; Netherlands; France; Belgium
2022	Unicorn Wars		Alberto Vázquez	Spain; Italy; France
2023	Chicken for Linda!	Linda veut du poulet!	Chiara Malta and Sébastien Laudenbach	France; Italy; Germany
2023	Art College 1994		Liu Jian	China
2023	Four Souls of Coyote	Kojot négy lelke	Aron Gauder	Hungary
2023	Kensuke's Kingdom		Neil Boyle and Kirk Hendry	United Kingdom; Luxembourg
2023	The Siren	La Sirène	Sepideh Farsi	Germany; Belgium; France; Luxembourg
2023	Lonely Castle in the Mirror	かがみの孤城	Keiichi Hara	Japan
2023	Mars Express		Jérémie Périn	France
2023	Sirocco and the Kingdom of the Winds	Sirocco et le Royaume des courants d'air	Benoît Chieux	Belgium; France
2023	The Inseparables		Jérémie Degruson	Belgium; Spain; France
2023	The Inventor		Jim Capobianco and Pierre-Luc Granjon	United States; France; Ireland
2023	The Tunnel to Summer, the Exit of Goodbyes	夏へのトンネル、さよならの出口	Tomohisa Taguchi	Japan
2024	Memoir of a Snail		Adam Elliot	Australia
2024	Ghost Cat Anzu	化け猫あんずちゃん	Yoko Kuno	Japan; France
2024	Into the Wonderwoods	Angelo, dans la forêt mystérieuse	Alexis Ducord	France; Luxembourg
2024	Flow	Straume	Gints Zilbalodis	Latvia; Belgium; France
2024	The Colors Within	きみの色	Naoko Yamada	Japan
2024	Totto-Chan: The Little Girl at the Window	窓ぎわのトットちゃん	Shinnosuke Yakuwa	Japan
2024	Rock Bottom		María Trénor	Spain; Poland
2024	Savages	Sauvages	Claude Barras	Switzerland
2024	A Boat in the Garden	Slocum et Moi	Jean-François Laguionie	France
2024	The Imaginary	屋根裏のラジャー	Yoshiyuki Momose	Japan
2024	The Storm		Zhigang "Busifan" Yang	China
2024	The Most Precious of Cargoes	La Plus Précieuse des marchandises	Michel Hazanavicius	France; Belgium
2025	Arco		Ugo Bienvenu	France; United States
2025	A Magnificent Life	Marcel et Monsieur Pagnol	Sylvain Chomet	France; Belgium; Luxembourg
2025	Allah Is Not Obliged	Allah n'est pas obligé	Zaven Najjar	Belgium; Canada; France; Luxembourg
2025	ChaO		Yasuhiro Aoki	Japan
2025	Dandelion's Odyssey	Planètes	Momoko Seto	Belgium; France
2025	Death Does Not Exist	La mort n'existe pas	Félix Dufour-Laperrière	Canada; France
2025	Into the Mortal World	落凡尘	Zhong Ding	China
2025	Little Amélie or the Character of Rain	Amélie et la Métaphysique des tubes	Maïlys Vallade, Liane-Cho Han	France
2025	Olivia and the Invisible Earthquake	L'Olívia i el terratrèmol invisible	Irene Iborra	Belgium; Chile; Spain; France
2025	The Last Blossom	ホウセンカ	Baku Kinoshita	Japan
2026	The Violinist		Raul Garcia, Ervin Han	Singapore; Spain; Italy
2026	Decorado		Alberto Vázquez	Spain
2026	In Waves		Phuong Mai Nguyen	Belgium; France
2026	Iron Boy	Le Corset	Louis Clichy	Belgium; France
2026	Lucy Lost	Lucy perdue	Olivier Clert	France
2026	Nobody	Làng làng shān xiǎo yāo guài (浪浪山小妖怪)	Yu Shiu	China
2026	The Sunrise File	Les dossiers de l’aube	Emilie Phuong, Rupert Wyatt	France; Luxembourg
2026	Tana	Xiao Na	Ji Zhao, Ying Shuang Zhou, Ke Er Zhu	China
2026	Tangles		Leah Nelson	Canada; United States
2026	Viva Carmen	Carmen l'Oiseau Rebel	Sebastien Laundenbach	Finland; France; Spain
2026	We Are Aliens	我々は宇宙人	Kohei Kadowaki	France; Japan

=== Feature films contrechamp in competition ===
Year	English title	Original title	Director(s)	Countrie(s)
2019	Away		Gints Zilbalodis	Latvia
2019	The Big Wish	Dia de Muertos	Carlos Gutiérrez Medrano	Mexico
2019	Children of the Sea	海獣の子供	Ayumu Watanabe	Japan
2019	Homeless		José Ignacio Navarro, Jorge Campusano, and Santiago O'Ryan	Chile; Argentina
2019	Kung Food	美食大冒险	Sun Haipeng	China
2019	Underdog	언더독	Oh Sung-yoon and Lee Chun-baek	South Korea
2019	Ville Neuve		Félix Dufour-Laperrière	Canada
2020	My Favorite War	Mans Mīļākais Karš	Ilze Burkovska Jacobsen	Latvia; Norway
2020	Accidental Luxuriance of the Translucent Watery Rebus	Slučajna Raskoš Prozirnog Vodenog Rebusa	Dalibor Barić	Croatia
2020	Beauty Water	기기괴괴 성형수	Cho Kyung-hun	South Korea
2020	The Knight and the Princess	الفارس والأميرة	Bashir el-Deek	Egypt
2020	Lava		Ayar Blasco	Argentina
2020	The Legend of Hei	罗小黑战记	Zhang Ping	China
2020	The Old Man	Vanamehe Film	Mikk Mägi and Oskar Lehemaa	Estonia
2020	On-Gaku: Our Sound	音楽	Kenji Iwaisawa	Japan
2020	The Shaman Sorceress	무녀도	Ahn Jae-hoon	South Korea
2020	True North		Eiji Han Shimizu	Japan; Indonesia
2021	Bob Cuspe - We Don't Like People	Bob Cuspe - Nós Não Gostamos de Gente	Cesar Cabral	Brazil
2021	Absolute Denial		Ryan Braund	United Kingdom
2021	Archipelago	Archipel	Félix Dufour-Laperrière	Canada
2021	Chicken of the Mound	土鸡	Xi Chen	China; Germany
2021	City of Lost Things	廢棄之城	Yee Chih-yen	Taiwan
2021	Climbing	클라이밍	Kim Hye-mi	South Korea
2021	Cryptozoo		Dash Shaw	United States
2021	Mount Fuji Seen from a Moving Train	Le Mont Fuji vu d'un Train en Marche	Pierre Hébert	Canada
2021	My Uncle José	Meu Tio José	Ducca Rios	Brazil
2022	Dozens of Norths	幾多の北	Kōji Yamamura	Japan
2022	Aurora's Sunrise		Inna Sahakyan	Germany; Lithuania; Armenia
2022	Chun Tae-il: A Flame That Lives On	전태일	Johnny Hong Jung-pyo	South Korea
2022	Home Is Somewhere Else		Carlos Hagerman and Jorge Villalobos	Mexico; Canada; United States
2022	Khamsa – The Well of Oblivion	خامسة – بئر النسيان	Khaled Chiheb	Algeria
2022	My Grandfather's Demons	Os demónios do meu avô	Nuno Beato	Spain; France; Portugal
2022	The Other Shape	La Otra Forma	Diego Guzman	Colombia
2022	Quantum Cowboys		Geoff Marslett	United States
2022	Silver Bird and Rainbow Fish		Lei Lei	Netherlands; United States
2022	Yaya e Lennie – The Walking Liberty		Alessandro Rak	Italy; France
2023	Robot Dreams		Pablo Berger	Spain; France
2023	When Adam Changes	Adam change lentement	Joël Vaudreuil	Canada
2023	Tender Metalheads	Heavies tendres	Carlos Perez-Reche and Joan Tomas	Spain
2023	Johnny & Me – A Journey through Time with John Heartfield	Johnny & Me - Eine Zeitreise mit John Heartfield	Katrin Rothe	Germany; Austria; Switzerland
2023	Komada: A Whisky Family	駒田蒸留所へようこそ	Masayuki Yoshihara	Japan
2023	The Sacred Cave	La Grotte sacrée	Daniel Minlo and Cyrille Masso	Cameroon
2023	Rosa and the Stone Troll		Karla Nor Holmbäck	Denmark
2023	Saleem		Cynthia Madanat Sharaiha	Jordan
2023	Slide		Bill Plympton	United States
2023	Toldi		Marcell Jankovics and Csakovics Lajos	Hungary
2023	Tony, Shelly and the Magic Light	Tonda, Slávka a kouzelné světlo	Filip Pošivač	Hungary; Czech Republic; Slovakia
2023	White Plastic Sky	Műanyag égbolt	Tibor Banoczki and Sarolta Szabo	Hungary; Slovakia
2024	Sultana's Dream	El Sueño de Sultana	Isabel Herguera	Spain; France
2024	Gill		Ahn Jae-huun	South Korea
2024	The Missing	Iti Mapukpukaw	Carl Joseph Papa	Philippines
2024	Living Large	Život k sežrání	Kristina Dufkova	Czech Republic
2024	Black Butterflies	Mariposas Negras	David Baute	Spain; Panama
2024	Our Crazy Love		Nelson Botter Jr.	Brazil
2024	Pelikan Blue	Kék Pelikan	László Csáki	Hungary
2024	Journey of Shadows	Reise der Schatten	Yves Netzhammer	Switzerland
2024	Sunburnt Unicorn		Nick Johnson	Canada
2024	Birth of Kitarō: The Mystery of GeGeGe	鬼太郎誕生 ゲゲゲの謎	Gō Koga	Japan
2024	The Glassworker	شیشہ گر	Usman Riaz	Pakistan
2025	Endless Cookie		Seth Scriver, Peter Scriver	Canada
2025	Balentes		Giovanni Columbu	Italy
2025	Jinsei	無名の人生	Ryuya Suzuki	Japan
2025	Lesbian Space Princess		Emma Hough Hobbs, Leela Varghese	Australia
2025	Memory Hotel		Heinrich Sabl	Germany; France
2025	Nimuendajú		Tania Cristina Anaya	Brazil; Peru
2025	Olivia & the Clouds	Olivia & Las Nubes	Tomás Pichardo Espaillat	Dominican Republic
2025	Space Cadet		Eric San (Kid Koala)	Canada
2025	Tales from the Magic Garden		David Sukup, Patrick Pašš, Leon Vidmar, Jean-Claude Rozec	Czech Republic; France; Slovakia; Slovenia
2025	The Great History of Western Philosophy	La gran historia de la filosofía occidental	Aria Covamonas	Mexico
2025	The Square	광장	Kim Bo-sol	South Korea
2026	Blaise		Dimitri Planchon, Jean-Paul Guigue	France
2026	58th		Carl Joseph Papa	Philippines
2026	Muyi	Muyi, la légende du village des femmes	Julien Chheng	France
2026	A New Dawn	花緑青が明ける日に	Yoshitoshi Shinomiya	Japan; France
2026	The Obsessed	トリツカレ男	Wataru Takahashi	Japan
2026	The Orbit of Minor Satellites		Christopher Sullivan	Japan
2026	Peleliu: Guernica of Paradise	ペリリュー -楽園のゲルニカ-	Gorō Kuji	Japan
2026	The Son of a Bitch	O filho da puta	Érica Maradona, Otto Guerra, Tania Anaya, Sávio Leite	Brazil
2026	Spacetime Chronicles		Stefano Bertelli	Italy
2026	Welcome to Dolly's House		Seven Ych, Rady Fu, Tree Muta	Taiwan
2026	Winnipeg, the Seed of Hope	Winnipeg, el barco de la esperanza	Beñat Beitia, Elio Quiroga	Spain; Chile; Argentina

=== Palmarès by producing countries ===
Countrie(s)	First awarded	Latest awarded	Total
France	1991	2025	24
10 Cristals du long metrage for Robinson & Co, Kirikou and the Sorceress, Renaissance, The Rabbi's Cat, April and the Extraordinary World, My Life as a Zucchini, Funan, I Lost My Body, Calamity, a Childhood of Martha Jane Cannary, Flee, Little Nicholas: Happy As Can Be and Arco. 6 Audience Awards for Max & Co, The Secret of Kells, Approved for Adoption, Long Way North, My Life as a Zucchini and I Lost My Body. 4 Jury Awards for Eleanor's Secret, My Mommy is in America and she has met Buffalo Bill, The Girl Without Hands and No Dogs or Italians Allowed. Directors: Jacques Colombat, Michel Ocelot, Christian Volckman, Dominique Monféry, Joann Sfar, Antoine Delesvaux, Laurent Boileau, Marc Boréal, Thibaut Chatel, Franck Ekinci, Christian Desmares, Rémi Chayé, Sébastien Laudenbach, Denis Do, Amandine Fredon and Benjamin Massoubre. 1 Audience Award for Little Amélie or the Character of Rain. Directors: Maïlys Vallade and Liane-Cho Han. 2 Contrechamp Awards for Robot Dreams and Sultana's Dream
United States	1997	2025	11
7 Cristals du long metrage for James and the Giant Peach, I Married a Strange Person!, Mutant Aliens, Sita Sings the Blues, Coraline, Fantastic Mr. Fox, Flee and Arco. 1 Audience Award for Fantastic Mr. Fox. 2 Jury Awards for Idiots and Angels and Cheatin'. Directors: Bill Plympton two times, Henry Selick twice, and Wes Anderson and Nina Paley once.
Japan	1993	2017	8
3 Cristals du long metrage for Porco Rosso, Pom Poko and Lu over the Wall. 1 Audience Award for Colorful. 4 Jury Awards for The Girl Who Leapt Through Time, Colorful, Miss Hokusai and In This Corner of the World. Directors: Keiichi Hara twice and Hayao Miyazaki, Isao Takahata, Mamoru Hosoda, Masaaki Yuasa and Sunao Katabuchi once.
United Kingdom	1987	2025	8
6 Cristals du long metrage for When the Wind Blows, Alice, James and the Giant Peach, Renaissance, Flee, Free Jimmy and Arco 2 Audience Awards for Max & Co and Loving Vincent. Directors: Jimmy T. Murakami, Hugh Welchman.
Belgium	1999	2018	6
3 Cristals du long metrage for Kirikou and the Sorceress, April and the Extraordinary World and Funan. 3 Audience Awards for Max & Co, The Secret of Kells and Approved for Adoption.
Luxembourg	1999	2018	6
3 Cristals du long metrage for Kirikou and the Sorceress, Renaissance and Funan. 1 Audience Award for The Breadwinner. 2 Jury Awards for My Mommy is in America and she has met Buffalo Bill and The Breadwinner.
Switzerland	1989	2016	5
2 Cristals du long metrage for Alice and My Life as a Zucchini. 3 Audience Awards for Max & Co, Approved for Adoption and My Life as a Zucchini. Directors: Frédéric and Samuel Guillaume, and Claude Barras.
South Korea	2002	2012	3
2 Cristals du long metrage for My Beautiful Girl, Mari and Oseam. 1 Audience Award for Approved for Adoption. Directors: Lee Sung-gang, Sung Baek-yeop and Jung Henin.
Brazil	2013	2014	3
2 Cristals du long metrage for Rio 2096: A Story of Love and Fury and The Boy and the World. 1 Audience Award for The Boy and the World. Directors: Luz Bolognesi and Alê Abreu.
Canada	2015	2025	4
1 Cristal du long metrage for April and the Extraordinary World. 1 Audience Award for The Breadwinner. 1 Jury Award for The Breadwinner. 1 Contrechamp Award for Endless Cookie.
Denmark	2015	2021	3
1 Audience Award for Long Way North. 2 Cristals du long metrage for Calamity, a Childhood of Martha Jane Cannary and Flee.
Australia	2009	2024	2
2 Cristal du long metrage for Mary and Max and Memoir of a Snail. Directors: Adam Elliot.
Hungary	1985	2005	2
2 Cristals du long metrage for Heroic Times and The District!. Directors: József Gémes and Áron Gauder.
Germany	1989	2008	2
1 Cristal du long metrage for Alice. 1 Audience Award for The Three Robbers. Directors: Hayo Freitag.
Norway	2007	2021	2
2 Cristals du long metrage for Free Jimmy and Flee.
Poland	2012	2017	2
1 Cristal du long metrage for Crulic: The Path to Beyond. 1 Audience Award for Loving Vincent. Directors: Dorota Kobiela. 1 Mention du jury for Kill It and Leave This Town. Directors: Mariusz Wilczyński.
Czechoslovakia	1989		1
1 Cristal du long metrage for Alice. Directors: Jan Švankmajer.
USSR / Russia	1989		1
1 Cristal du long metrage for Alice.
Hong Kong	2003		1
1 Cristal du long metrage for My Life as McDull. Directors: Brian Tse.
Romania	2012		1
1 Cristal du long metrage for Crulic: The Path to Beyond. Directors: Anca Damian.
Sweden	2021		1
1 Cristal du long metrage for Flee.
Ireland	2009	2018	3
2 Audience Awards for The Secret of Kells and The Breadwinner. 1 Jury Award for The Breadwinner. Directors: Nora Twomey twice and Tomm Moore once.
Spain	2012	2023	5
1 Audience Award for O Apóstolo. 2 Jury Awards for Wrinkles and Buñuel in the Labyrinth of the Turtles. Directors: Ignacio Ferreras, Fernando Cortizo and Salvador Simó. 2 Contrechamp Awards for Robot Dreams and Sultana's Dream
Italy	2010	2022	2
2 Jury Awards for Eleanor's Secret and No Dogs or Italians Allowed.
Netherlands	2019		1
1 Jury Award for Buñuel in the Labyrinth of the Turtles.

=== Annecy Crystal short films ===
- This prize was originally named the Grand Prix. In 1987 it was renamed the Grand Prix du court métrage to differentiate it from the feature film prize. In 2003 it took its current name, the Annecy Crystal (le Cristal d'Annecy).

Year	English title	Original title	Director(s)	Countrie(s)
1960	The Lion and the Song	Lev a písnička	Břetislav Pojar	Czechoslovakia
1962	The Flying Man		George Dunning	United Kingdom
1963	Incorrectly Drawn Hen	Špatně namalovaná slepice	Jiří Brdečka	Czechoslovakia
1965	The Lady and the Cellist	La Demoiselle et le Violoncelliste	Jean-François Laguionie	France
1967	Ares vs. Atlas	Arès contre Atlas	Manolo Otero	France
1967	Cages	Klatki	Mirosław Kijowicz	Poland
1967	Tamer of the Wild Horses	Krotitelj divljih konja	Nedeljko Dragić	Yugoslavia
1967	The Breath		Jimmy Murakami	United Kingdom
1971	The Appeal	Apel	Ryszard Czekała	Poland
1971	The Bride	Nevesta	Borislav Sajtinac	Yugoslavia
1971	The Further Adventures of Uncle Sam		Dale Case and Robert Michell	United States
1973	Frank Film		Frank Mouris	United States
1975	The Step	Le Pas	Piotr Kamler	France
1977	David		Paul Driessen	Netherlands
1977	The Sand Castle	Le Château de sable	Co Hoedeman	Canada
1979	Afterlife		Ishu Patel	Canada
1979	Mr. Pascal		Alison De Vere	United Kingdom
1981	Tango		Zbigniew Rybczyński	Poland
1983	Dimensions of Dialogue	Možnosti dialogu	Jan Švankmajer	Czechoslovakia
1985	A Greek Tragedy	Een griekse tragedie	Nicole van Goethem	Belgium
1987	The Man Who Planted Trees	L'Homme qui plantait des arbres	Frédéric Back	Canada
1987	Crushed World	Smatchkan sviat	Boiko Kanev	Bulgaria
1989	The Hill Farm		Mark Baker	United Kingdom
1991	Grey Wolf and Little Riding Hood	Seryi Volk & Krasnaya Shapochka	Garri Bardin	USSR
1993	The Mighty River	Le Fleuve aux grandes eaux	Frédéric Back	Canada
1995	Switchcraft		Konstantin Bronzit	Russia
1997	The Old Lady and the Pigeons	La Vieille Dame et les Pigeons	Sylvain Chomet	France
1998	Nocturnal Butterflies	Nachtvlinders	Paul Delvaux and Raoul Servais	Belgium
1999	When the Day Breaks		Wendy Tilby and Amanda Forbis	Canada
2000	The Old Man and the Sea	Starik i more	Aleksandr Petrov	Russia
2001	Father and Daughter		Michael Dudok de Wit	Netherlands
2002	Barcode		Adriaan Lokman	Netherlands
2003	Mt. Head	Atamayama (頭山)	Koji Yamamura	Japan
2004	Lorenzo		Mike Gabriel	United States
2005	The Mysterious Geographic Explorations of Jasper Morello		Anthony Lucas	Australia
2006	Tragic Story with Happy Ending	Histoire tragique avec fin heureuse	Regina Pessoa	Portugal
2007	Peter & the Wolf		Suzie Templeton	United Kingdom
2008	La Maison en petits cubes	Tsumiki no Ie (つみきのいえ)	Kunio Katō	Japan
2009	Slaves	Slavar	David Aronowitsch and Hanna Heilborn	Sweden
2010	The Lost Thing		Andrew Ruhemann and Shaun Tan	Australia
2011	Pixels		Patrick Jean	France
2012	Tram	Tramvaj	Michaela Pavlátová	Czech Republic
2013	Subconscious Password		Chris Landreth	Canada
2014	Man on the Chair		Dahee Jeong	South Korea
2015	We Can't Live Without Cosmos	Mi ne mozhem zhit bez kosmosa	Konstantin Bronzit	Russia
2016	The Head Vanishes	Une tête disparaît	Franck Dion	Canada; France
2017	The Burden	Min Börda	Niki Lindroth von Bahr	Sweden
2018	Bloeistraat 11		Nienke Deutz	Belgium; Netherlands
2019	Mémorable		Bruno Collet	France
2020	The Physics of Sorrow		Theodore Ushev	Canada
2021	Peel	Écorce	Samuel Patthey, Silvain Monney	Switzerland
2022	Amok		Balázs Turai	Hungary; Romania
2023	27		Flóra Anna Buda	France; Hungary
2024	Percebes		Alexandra Ramires and Laura Gonçalves	Portugal; France
2025	The Night Boots		Pierre-Luc Granjon	France
2026	Paper Trail		Don Hertzfeldt	United States

=== Films produced for television ===
Year	Title
1995	Insektors: Le pont de la Konkorde (Grand Prix pour un spécial TV)
1997	Famous Fred (Grand prix du film TV)
1998	Die Hard (Grand prix attribué à une série TV)
2000	The Periwig-Maker (Grand prix du film TV)
2002	Hamilton Mattress (Grand prix)
2003	Verte (Le Cristal pour une production TV)
2004	Creature Comforts "Cats or Dogs?" (Le Cristal pour une production TV)
2005	Peppa Pig "Mummy Pig at Work" (Le Cristal pour une production TV)
2006	Pocoyo "A Little Something Between Friends" (Le Cristal pour une production TV)
2007	Shaun the Sheep "Still Life" (Le Cristal pour une production TV)
2008	Moot Moot 'L'enfer de la mode (Le Cristal pour une production TV)
2009	Log Jam "The Log", "The Rain", "The Moon", "The Snake" (Le Cristal pour une production TV)
2010	Der Kleine und das Biest (The Little Boy and the Beast) (Le Cristal pour une production TV)
2011	The Amazing World of Gumball, "The Quest" (Le Cristal pour une production TV)
2012	Secret Mountain Fort Awesome, "Nightmare Sauce" (Le Cristal pour une production TV)
2013	Room on the Broom (Le Cristal pour une production TV)
2014	En sortant de l'école "Tant de forêts" (Le Cristal pour une production TV)
2015	Hello World! "Long-Eared Owl" (Le Cristal pour une production TV)
2016	Stick Man (Le Cristal pour une production TV)
2017	Revolting Rhymes (Le Cristal pour une production TV)
2018	PIG: The Dam Keeper Poems "Yellow Flower", "Hello Nice to Meet You" (Le Cristal pour une production TV)
2019	Panique au village "La Foire agricole" (Panic in the Village "The County Fair") (Le Cristal pour une production TV)
2020	L'Odyssée de Choum (Shooom's Odyssey) (Le Cristal pour une production TV)
2021	Vanille (Le Cristal pour une production TV)
2022	My Year of Dicks (Le Cristal pour une production TV)
2023	Pebble Hill (Le Cristal pour une production TV)
2024	The Drifting Guitar (Le Cristal pour une production TV)
2025	Christo The Civilized Barbarian "Hunting Party"(Le Cristal pour une production TV)
2026	The Great Dreamscape(Le Cristal pour une production TV)

== See also ==
- List of animation awards
- Independent animation
