= Marona's Fantastic Tale =

2019 film by Anca Damian

- French theatrical release poster
- Romanian: Călătoria fantastică a Maronei
- Directed by: Anca Damian
- Written by: Anghel Damian
- Produced by: Anca Damian; Ron Dyens; Tomas Leyers
- Production companies: Aparte Film; Minds Meet; Sacrebleu Productions
- Distributed by: Cinéma Public Films (France); Aparte Film (Romania)
- Release dates: 10 June 2019 (Annecy International Animation Film Festival); 4 October 2019 (Romania); 8 January 2020 (France)
- Running time: 92 minutes
- Countries: France; Belgium; Romania
- Language: French
- Budget: €2,700,000
- Box office: $46,707

Marona's Fantastic Tale (French: L'extraordinaire voyage de Marona, Romanian: Călătoria fantastică a Maronei) is a 2019 animated feature film directed by Anca Damian and written by Anghel Damian. The film tells the life story of a dog as she travels between various owners and learns to navigate the challenges of being a pet.

== Plot ==
Having just been hit by a car, a dog narrator sets up a frame story in which the events of the film are established as her life flashing before her eyes. The dog was born to a street dog and a purebred dog that purports to hate non-purebreds, thus the narrator muses that this is a shining example of blind love. Born as the youngest of a litter of nine, the narrator acquires her first name Nine. She is quickly given up and ends up as a stray for a period of time until she is taken in by an acrobat named Manole.

Manole names her Ana, and provides her with a humble, yet happy life as they travel around performing on the streets. Ana experiences love for a human for the first time, becoming extremely loyal and satisfied with the state of her life. However, she realizes that she is holding Manole back from achieving his dreams, and when she sees how unhappy he is, she decides to run away.

Once again living on the streets, the next human to find her is a construction worker named Istvan, who brings food to her every day. The narrator acquires her third name: Sara. Eventually, he decides to take her to his sick mother's house. After an accident that results in his mother hurting Sara, Istvan decides to take her in himself. While his wife initially seems eager to have a pet, she quickly grows tired of the dog. Once again, Sara reminisces how she could smell the unhappiness of Istvan, and decides that it is best for her to leave.

As she is walking through a park, a little girl named Solange finds the dog and decides to take her in and name her Marona. Solange lives with her single mother and her grandfather, who are both skeptical of Marona at first, but grow to love her. Years pass by and Solange, now a teenager, takes Marona on a walk and decides to tie her to a tree and sneak off — presumably to go to a party. Marona escapes and chases after her, eventually resulting in her being hit by a car.

== Cast ==
| Character | Original Actor | Dub Actor |
|---|---|---|
| Marona | Lizzie Brocheré | Cherami Leigh |
| Manole | Bruno Salomone | Ryan Nicolls |
| Istvan | Thierry Hancisse | Marc Thompson |
| Medeea | Nathalie Boutefeu | Tara Platt |
| Solange | Shyrelle Mai Yvert (child) | Valerie Steller (child) |
| Solange | Maïra Schmitt (teen) | Kiana Thompson (teen) |
| Solange's Grandpa | Georges Claisse | Kim Strauss |
| Istvan's Mother | Annie Mercier | Dale Edwards |
| Madalina | Isabelle Vitari | Lynn Norris |
| Doctor | Philippe Sax | Ryan Nicolls |
| Vet | Etienne Guillou-Kervern | Michael Sinterniklaas |

== Reception ==
=== Critical response ===
As of October 2021, on the review aggregator website Rotten Tomatoes, Marona's Fantastic Tale has a 96% approval rating based on 23 reviews, with an average rating of 8/10. On Metacritic, the film has an average score of 77 out of 100 based on 7 reviews, indicating "generally favorable reviews".

The film has received mostly positive reviews with critics praising its unique visual style. Writing in the New York Times, Teo Bugbee says "images appear pasted together like a collage, with elements assembled from distinct styles." Its unique combination of hand-drawn and computer-generated elements is noted by Reuben Baron of CBR, "the hand-painted and crayon-scribbled co-exist with the digital; the animation ranges from extremely fluid to hyper-limited, at times in different elements of the same shot."

Marona's Fantastic Tale has also been applauded for avoiding a formulaic storytelling approach, instead exploring themes of belonging and love in a thoughtful manner. Michael Ordoña of the Chicago Tribune states "amid the trappings of the story of a cute dog are meditations on the need for purpose, the simplicity of joy and the joy of simplicity, the willingness to be loyal and committed, and the heartbreak that so often follows." Similarly, Matt Zoller Seitz says "this is a movie about existence, about the ordinary yet often wrenching truth of what it means to live, age, and die, leaving a legacy of love and regret, if not necessarily children or achievements."

=== Accolades ===
| Year | Award | Category | Result | Ref. |
|---|---|---|---|---|
| 2019 | Bucheon International Animation Film Festival | Best Animated Feature | Won | |
| 2019 | Festival européen du film fantastique de Strasbourg | Prix spécial du jury | Won | |
| 2020 | Dublin International Film Festival | Dublin Film Critics Special Jury Prize | Won | |
| 2019 | European Film Awards | European Animated Feature Film | Nominated | |
| 2019 | Gijón International Film Festival | Audience Award Feature Film | Won | |
| 2020 | Tokyo Anime Award | Feature Animation film - Grand Prize | Won | |
