= Max & Co =

- Directed by: Samuel Guillaume; Frédéric Guillaume
- Written by: Emmanuel Salinger; Christine Dory
- Produced by: Samuel Guillaume; Emmanuel Salinger
- Starring: Lorànt Deutsch; Amélie Lerma; Virginie Efira; Patrick Bouchitey; Micheline Dax; Denis Podalydès
- Cinematography: Renato Berta
- Edited by: Mackinnon & Saunders
- Music by: Bruno Coulais
- Production companies: MAX-LeFilm-Sàrl; Ciné-Manufacture SA; Nexus Factory; Future Films; With The Support of: CNC; Fonds Government of Belgium Tax Shelter; Fonds Suisse Regio Films; Television Suisse Romande
- Distributed by: WilDBuncH InternationaL
- Release dates: 11 June 2007 (Annecy); 6 February 2008 (Belgium); 13 February 2008 (France)
- Running time: 76 minutes
- Countries: Switzerland; France; Belgium
- Language: French
- Box office: $1 million

Max & Co is a 2007 stop-motion animated feature film released in Belgium, France, and Switzerland in February 2008. It won the Audience Award at the 2007 Annecy International Animated Film Festival. With its budget of CHF 30 million (€18.6 million), of which CHF 1.5 million were subsidised by the Swiss Federal Office of Culture, it was the most expensive Swiss film ever.

== Plot ==
15-year-old fox Max sets off for Saint-Hilare in search of his father, the famous troubadour Johnny Bigoude, who disappeared shortly before Max's birth. He is waylaid by Sam, a rascally fairground entertainer, and introduced to the delights of the amazing Fly Swatter Festival. When Max finally gets there, Saint-Hilaire turns out to be the private kingdom of Bzzz & Co., infamous manufacturers of flyswatters, run by the degenerate frog Rodolfo. Musical virtuoso Max makes a big impression, especially on the smart, lovely, resourceful mouse Felicie, who convinces Rodolfo to hire him.

== Cast ==
Character	French voice actor	Swiss German voice actor
Max	Lorant Deutsch	Patrick Venetz
Sam	Stéphane Sanseverino	Beat Schlatter
Cathy	Virginie Efira	Viola Tami
Felicie	Amélie Lerma	Fabienne Hadorn
Rodolfo	Patrick Bouchitey	Gilles Tschudi
Martin	Denis Podalydès	Patrick Frey
Doudou	Micheline Dax	Dodo Hug
Bobole	Mathias Mlekuz	
Bernard	François Levantal	
Marcel	Bernard Ballet	

== Reception ==
Although well-received critically, the "anti-capitalist ecological fable" was a commercial failure. Only 16,000 tickets were sold instead of the projected 110,000, and the production companies filed for bankruptcy in August 2008.

== See also ==
- List of animated feature-length films
- List of stop-motion films
