= Oxmo Puccino =

Malian-French rapper (born 1974)

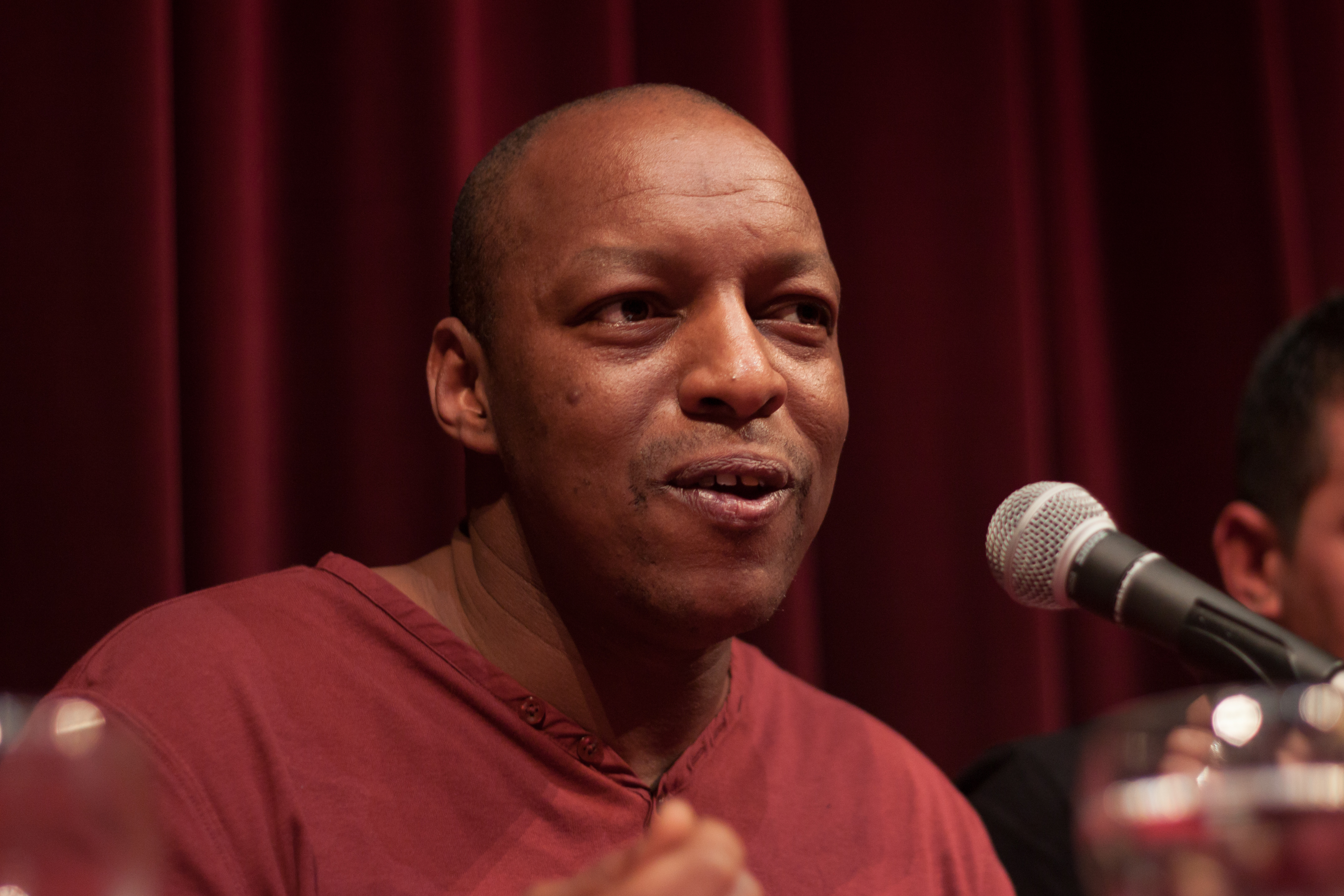
- Oxmo Puccino in 2013

Background information
- Also known as: Jon Smoke; Jonxmoke; Black Desperado; Black Popeye; Black Jacques Brel; Jacques Brel du hip-hop
- Born: Abdoulaye Plea Diarra; 3 August 1974 (age 51); Ségou, Mali
- Origin: Paris, France
- Genres: Hip hop
- Occupations: Rapper, singer, songwriter, composer
- Labels: Cinq7, Wagram Music
- Website: https://www.oxmo.net/

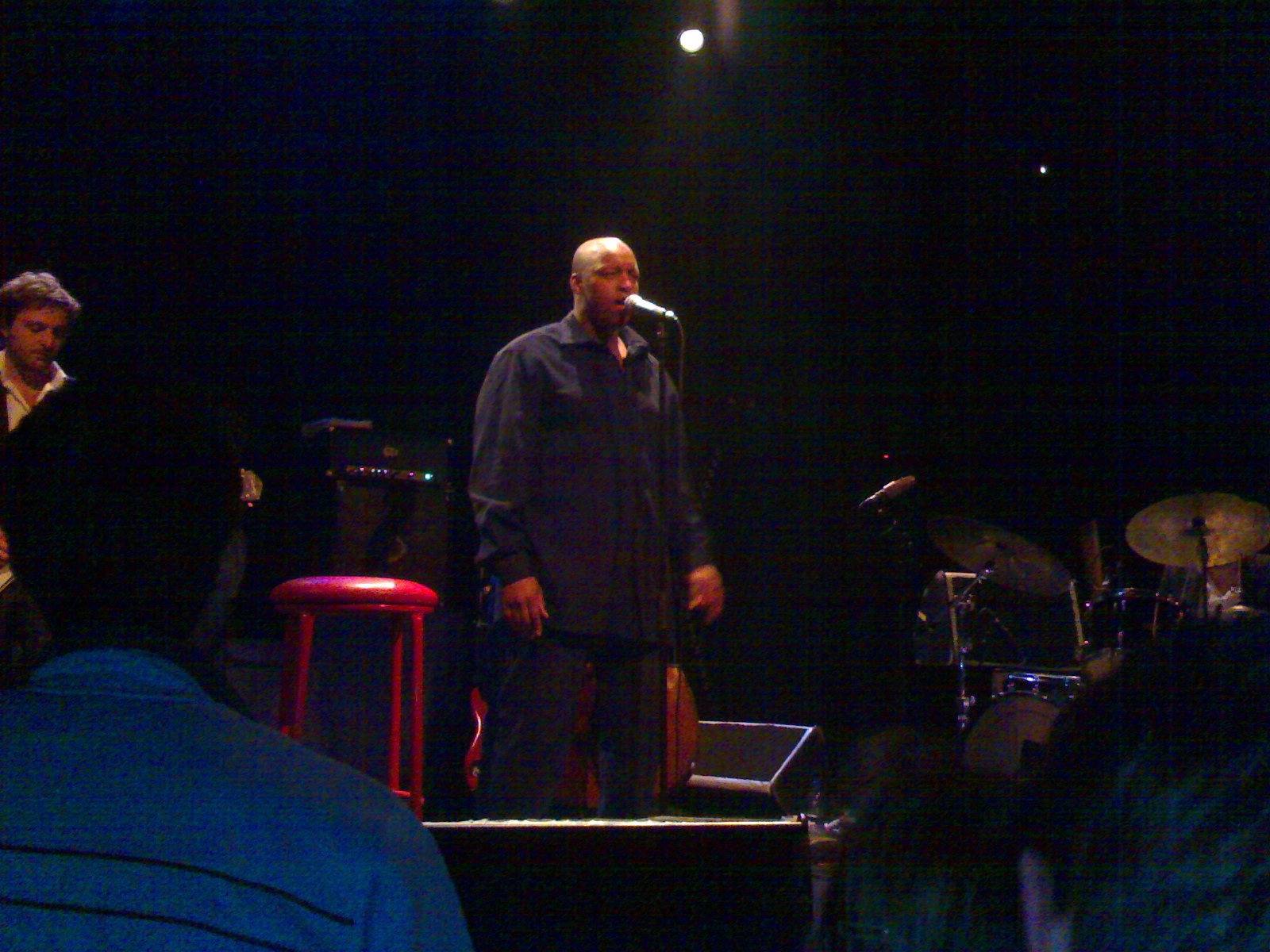
Oxmo Puccino

Abdoulaye Plea Diarra (French pronunciation: [abdulaj plea djaʁa]; born 3 August 1974), better known by his stage name Oxmo Puccino (French: [ɔksmo putʃino], Italian: [putˈtʃiːno]), is a Malian-French rapper.

== Career ==
A longtime hip hop fan, at age 21 Diarra began his collaboration with the fledgling rap collective Time Bomb, honing his craft alongside future superstars like Booba and Diam's. He quickly developed into a lyricist with a metaphorical ingenuity far more advanced than his contemporaries, crafting violent yet strangely poetic portraits of urban Paris life and drawing on the street-smart American hip-hop of the Notorious B.I.G. and other icons to document life in Paris' hardscrabble 19th district. In 1996 Oxmo Puccino made his recorded debut with Pucc. Fiction, a contribution to the compilation L432. A series of subsequent mixtape appearances solidified his growing reputation within the French rap underground, and in 1998 he issued his solo debut, Opéra Puccino. Its 2001 follow-up, L'Amour Est Mort, proved Puccino's creative and commercial breakthrough, while 2004's Le Cactus de Sibérie confirmed his star status. After signing to the venerable jazz label Blue Note, Puccino assembled a new backing group, the Jazzbastards, to record 2006's Lipopette Bar.

== In popular culture ==
- In 2007, rapper Styles P. used the instrumental of "Black Desperado" in his own album Super Gangster (Extraordinary Gentleman), in the song "Holiday". The track was produced by DJ Green Lantern.
- In 2011, he was in a Nike ad promotion reciting a passage from Cyrano de Bergerac
- He has appeared in 2011 music video for "1990" by Orelsan, as a tribute to the 1990s. He was invited to sing the track in Orelsan's live tour as a guest in the Paris Olympia gig in 2012.
- He is featured as the spoken word artist on Ibrahim Maalouf's track, "Douce", from the 2011 studio album, "Diagnostic".

== Personal life ==
Puccino was born in 1974 in Ségou, Mali. He came to Paris one year later, and lived in the 19th arrondissement from the age of 5. Oxmo Puccino is the older brother of the French international basketball player Mamoutou Diarra.

== Discography ==
=== Albums ===
Studio albums

Year	Album	Charts			Certification
Year	Album	BEL Wa	FRA	SWI	Certification
1998	Opéra Puccino	—	7	—	
2001	L'amour est mort	37	13	—	
2004	Le cactus de Sibérie	—	20	—	
2007	Lipopette Bar (Oxmo Puccino & The Jazzbastards)	—	22	—	
2009	L'arme de paix	41	8	68	
2012	Roi sans carosse	28	15	41	
2014	Au pays d'Alice (Ibrahim Maalouf & Oxmo Puccino)	113	43	—	
2015	La voix lactée	147	34	84	
2019	La nuit du reveil	63	17	47	

Live albums

Year	Album	Charts	Certification
Year	Album	FR	Certification
2005	Black Tour Desperado	154	
2010	Minutes magiques	—	

=== Mixtapes ===
Year	Album	Charts	Certification
Year	Album	FR	Certification
2005	La Réconciliation (DJ Cream présente Oxmo Puccino)	45	

Non-charting

- 2003: The Best of Puccino Tape (Vol.8 - Mixed by DJ Nels)
- 2004: Puccino Airlines
- 2004: Time Bomb, Vol.8 - Puccino Tape
- 2012: Doux or Die Mixtape (Mixed by DJ Cream)

=== Singles / Maxi singles ===
Year	Single	Charts	Certification	Album
Year	Single	FR	Certification	Album
1998	"Mama Lova" (Kheops / Oxmo Puccino)	96		
1998	"Amour et Jalousie"	—		
1998	"Le mensongeur"	55		
1999	"L'enfant seul"	84		
1999	"Le jour ou tu partiras"	—		
2001	"Ghetto du monde"	—		
2002	"Avoir des potes"	52		
2004	"Quand j'arrive / J'ai mal au mic"	—		
2004	"On danse pas"	—		
2015	Une Chance	—		

=== Featured in ===
Year	Single	Charts	Album
Year	Single	FR	Album
2016	"Bal de Bamako" (M, Toumani Diabaté & Sidiki Diabaté feat. Fatoumata Diawara & Oxmo Puccino)	140	Lamomali
2019	"26 décembre 1999" (Lacrim feat. Oxmo Puccino)	130	Lacrim
2022	"ça veut rien dire" (Achile feat. Oxmo Puccino)	-	Achile

== Filmography ==
Writer

- 2005: Dans tes rêves

Actor

- 2006: Arthur and the Invisibles (French title Arthur et les Minimoys) as Mover (film directed by Luc Besson)
- 2006: Sheitan (film directed by Kim Chapiron)
- 2008: Écrire pour un chanteur as Harry in episode "Demain peut-être" (TV series)
- 2009: Storytelling, la machine à raconter des histoires as host and himself (documentary)
- 2010: Rubik's Cube as Teacher (short film)
- 2010: Histoires de vies as François in episode "Conte de la frustration" (TV series)
- 2015: Adama as Djo (voice)
- 2025: Arco as Arco's father (voice)
