= Adama (film) =

- Film poster
- Directed by: Simon Rouby
- Written by: Julien Lilti; Simon Rouby; Bénédicte Galup (collaboration)
- Produced by: Azmina Goulamaly; Séverine Lathuillière; Alain Seraphine
- Edited by: Jean-Baptiste Alazard
- Music by: Pablo Pico
- Production companies: Pipangai Production; Naïa Productions; France 3 Cinéma; Albatros Productions
- Distributed by: Océan Films
- Release dates: 15 June 2015 (Annecy); 21 October 2015 (France)
- Running time: 82 minutes
- Country: France
- Language: French
- Budget: $3.7 million
- Box office: $505.000

Adama is a 2015 French animated drama film directed by Simon Rouby. It tells the story of a young West African boy who sets off across Europe in search of his older brother during the First World War. It premiered at the Annecy International Animated Film Festival in June 2015.

== Voice cast ==
- Azize Diabaté Abdoulaye as Adama
- Pascal N'Zonzi as Abdou
- Oxmo Puccino as Djo
- Jack Mba as Samba

== Accolades ==
Award / Film Festival	Category	Recipients	Result
Annecy International Animated Film Festival	Gan Foundation Aid for Distribution for a Work in Progress Award		Won
César Awards	Best Animated Feature Film		Nominated
European Film Awards	Best Animated Feature Film		Nominated
Prix Jacques Prévert du Scénario	Best Original Screenplay	Julien Lilti, Simon Rouby and Bénédicte Galup	Nominated
