= Khamsa – The Well of Oblivion =

2024 Algerian animated film

- Theatrical release poster
- Directed by: Khaled Chiheb
- Written by: Khaled Chiheb
- Produced by: Kamal Mouhoune; Khaled Boumriche
- Starring: Dima Tourgane
- Music by: Tobias Lilja
- Production company: D-clik Production
- Release dates: June 2022 (Annecy); August 23, 2024 (Algeria)
- Running time: 77 minutes
- Country: Algeria
- Language: Arabic

Khamsa – The Well of Oblivion (Arabic: خامسة – بئر النسيان) is a 2022 Algerian animated film directed by Khaled Chiheb, who goes by the alias "Vynom," and produced by D-clik Production. The film is 77 minutes long, in the Arabic language, and represents Algeria's first animated feature film.

The film was selected for competition at major festivals, including the 2022 Annecy International Animation Film Festival and the Ottawa International Animation Festival. In 2023, it won the Kabuku Award at the inaugural Niigata International Animation Film Festival in Japan.

== Synopsis ==
The story follows a young boy named Adi, who wakes up at the bottom of a dark well with complete amnesia. He finds himself lying on sand and walks through a fire-lit gallery until he meets Tidar, a large, benevolent creature. Tidar explains to Adi that his memories are locked behind an immense door that he must open before they are lost forever. Accompanied by Tidar and another companion – a small one-eyed blue flame creature named Khamsa – Adi journeys through strange, surreal landscapes (including buried cities, petrified forests, and marshlands) in search of his past.

== Production ==
In 2016, a team of three Algerian illustrators, Khaled Chiheb (Vynom), Kamel Zakour and Chafik Rouag, created an animated short film titled Khamsa, which was selected for pitching at the Annecy International Animation Film Market (MIFA).

Vynom developed the project further, and eventually expanded it into a feature-length film. The completed feature, Khamsa – The Well of Oblivion, was finished in 2022.

Vynom served as director and screenwriter, with art direction by Kamal Zakour, and production by Kamal Mouhoune and Khaled Boumriche (under D-clik production). Dima Tourgane was the voice acting lead, and music was done by Tobias Lilja.

Vynom stated that the main inspiration for his movie was Mamoru Oshii’s Angel's Egg. In addition to this, he mentioned Tsutomu Nihei's Blame!, and video games such as Shadow of the colossus and Bloodborne as other influences.

== Release ==
After completion, Khamsa – The Well of Oblivion was entered into the 2022 festival circuit. It was officially selected for the feature competition at the Annecy International Animation Film Festival (June 2022) and at the Ottawa International Animation Festival (September 2022).

In 2023, Khamsa was invited to the first Niigata International Animation Film Festival (Japan), where it won the Kabuku Award, a prize for films “not constrained by conventional values”.

The film was released theatrically in Algeria in August 23, 2024, in Algiers, Oran and Constantine. It has drawn attention in Algeria for being produced to international standards, and is often cited as the first feature-length animation made in the country.
