= Lee Sung-gang =

South Korean film director and screenwriter

- Born: October 25, 1962 (age 64); South Korea
- Education: Yonsei University - Psychology
- Occupations: Film director; screenwriter
- Years active: 1995-present

Korean name
- Hangul: 이성강
- Hanja: 李成彊
- RR: I Seonggang
- MR: I Sŏnggang

Lee Sung-gang (Korean: 이성강; born October 25, 1962) is a South Korean film director and screenwriter. He is recognized for the lyricism in his animated films, the best known of which are My Beautiful Girl, Mari (2002) and Yobi, the Five Tailed Fox (2007).

== Career ==
Lee Sung-gang entered Yonsei university in 1981 and graduated with a Psychology degree from Yonsei University in 1991. Lee was originally part of a Minjung art collective called Ganeunpae (Korean: 가는패) in the 1980s. He started his career as an animator in 1995 under the Korean animation group Dal by directing numerous animated short films such as Soul, Lovers, Umbrella, and Ashes in the Thicket. He debuted as a feature-length animation director with My Beautiful Girl, Mari in 2002. For his sophomore effort, he directed the live-action feature film Texture of Skin in 2005 (which received a theatrical release in 2007). He returned to animation in 2007, with Yobi, the Five Tailed Fox.

Lee was awarded at the 26th Annecy International Animated Film Festival (Grand Prix, Best Feature Film) in 2002, Animafest Zagreb (Special Award) in 2004, and Chicago International Children's Film Festival (Certificate of Excellence Prize) in 2005.

== Filmography ==
- Princess Aya(프린세스 아야) (2019)
- Kai (카이: 거울 호수의 전설) (2016)
- Aksim (악심) (2014) (director)
- A Monster in the Reservoir (저수지의 괴물) (2012) (director, writer, cinematographer, editor, producer)
- The House (2010) (producer)
- A Day of Water Giant (2008) (director)
- Yobi, the Five Tailed Fox (2007) (director, writer)
- If You Were Me: Anima Vision "Bicycle Trip" (2005) (director, writer, editor)
- Texture of Skin (살결) (2005) (director, writer)
- O-nu-ri (2004) (director, writer)
- My Beautiful Girl, Mari (2002) (director, writer)
- Room of Sound (소리의 방) (2000)
- Record of April 23 (2000) (director, writer)
- Ashes in the Thicket (덤불 속의 재) (1999) (director, writer)
- Ocean (1998) (director, editor, sound)
- Umbrella (우산) (1997) (director, writer, sound)
- 낫 (1997) (director)
- Thief (도둑놈) (1997) (director)
- Lovers (연인) (1996) (director, writer, sound)
- Soul (넋) (1995) (director, writer)
- Torso (1995) (director)
- Du Gaeui Bang (Room for Two) (1995) (director, writer)
