= Funan (film) =

2019 animated period drama film directed by Denis Do

- French theatrical release poster
- Directed by: Denis Do
- Written by: Denis Do; Magali Pouzol; Elise Trinh (participation of)
- Produced by: Sébastien Onomo; David Grumbach; Annemie Degryse; Louise Génis Cosserat; Justin Stewart
- Starring: Bérénice Bejo; Louis Garrel
- Edited by: Laurent Prim
- Music by: Thibault Kientz Agyeman
- Production companies: Les Films d'ici; Sébastien Onomo; BAC Films
- Distributed by: BAC Films (France); Lumière (Belgium)
- Release dates: 11 June 2018 (Annecy International Animation Film Festival); 6 March 2019 (France); 24 April 2019 (Belgium)
- Running time: 84 minutes
- Countries: France; Luxembourg; Belgium
- Language: French
- Box office: $15,152

Funan is a 2018 period drama animated film directed by Denis Do and written by Do and Magali Pouzol with the participation of Elise Trinh, about a Cambodian woman's search for her son, who was separated from her during a chaotic forced relocation at the beginning of the Khmer Rouge revolution in April 1975.

The original-language version of the film, in which the dialogue is principally in French, stars the voices of Bérénice Bejo and Louis Garrel.

== Plot ==
Chou lives in Phnom Penh with her husband, Khuon, their youngest son Sovanh, and their family, including Khuon's brother Meng, Chou's mother and grandmother, and their other children, Hout, Tuch, and Lili. In 1975, the Khmer Rouge topple the government and the family is forcibly evacuated from the city by the revolutionaries. Along the grueling trip, Sovanh and his grandmother become separated from the family, and the Khmer Rouge guards forbid Chou from trying to find them.

When they reach the neighboring town, they realize that their Cousin Sok has become one of the revolutionaries and the entire town converted into a commune. The family is stripped of what possessions they cannot hide and worked to the bone with barely any food. Chou asks after her son and is assured he's in a different labor camp but is forbidden to see him. Meng wants to leave, but Khuon insists they have no choice but to be subservient. At Chou's insistence, Khuon tries to cross the river to find Sovanh, but is captured and beaten. Tuch falls ill, and the family gives their last valuables to a woman from the camp, known for sleeping with the Khmer Rouge, to try and find medicine. But Tuch dies before she can return. The woman returns having been unable to find medicine and is beaten by the other women of the camp. Before dying, she leaves her own son in Chou's care. Sok takes pity on Khuon and allows him to try to find Sovanh, but by the time he arrives, the child has been moved again.

Throughout, Sovanh lives on with his grandma, and a girl he befriends at his work camp. Horrific deaths unfold around him, and the girl eventually sacrifices herself to allow Sovanh to avoid capture while they steal food.

Unable to stand it any longer, Meng makes a break for the border - Khuon runs after to wish him luck but is caught by a Khmer Rouge guard. Sok kills him, saving Khuon's life. Khuon and Chou make it back, but another vengeful Khmer Rouge kills Sok in retribution. The group is moved again on trains, and Chou is separated from the child she was trusted to look after. The train stops when one of the Khmer Rouge's daughters is drowning in a well, and Khuon helps save her, angering Chou. Soon after, the men and woman are driven to separate camps leaving only Chou, her mother, and Lili. Months pass. The Khmer Rouge woman who would have drowned, Peuv, attempts to give thanks by sneaking food to Chou and her family, but Chou rejects it despite their starvation, as a means of keeping her dignity. Chou's mother notices that one of the guards fancies Lili, and encourages her to use this to attain food. But after it is implied that the guard rapes her, Lili hangs herself. At long last, Hout makes it back from the men's camp, saying he got separated from Khuon. But when he hears about what happened to Lili, he finds the guard who did it and burns him alive in a thatched hut. He is killed, alongside an innocent old woman accused of being a sympathizer. Chou's mother dies of starvation.

Years pass and an emaciated Khuon finds Chou in an infirmary. He says he's found Sovanh, and she musters the last of her strength to move on. The Cambodian-Vietnamese War begins, and as Vietnamese forces advance on their camp, the two make one final break to find Sovanh. They're seen by Peuv, who covers for them, allowing their escape. After journeying far and wide, they finally find the group of children, seemingly abandoned, and among them is Sovanh.

Reunited, the family makes one final break for the Thailand border. Along the way, they encounter a mob of vigilantes killing Khmer Rouge members, as they are about to kill Peuv. Chou confronts the group, tearing open her shirt to show that she has suffered just as they have and successfully saves Peuv. They encourage her to follow them to Thailand, but she refuses, as she still has family in Cambodia. The family reaches the border. Khuon scouts up ahead. As Chou and Sovanh watch, Khuon is spotted by Khmer Rouge guards. He purposefully runs away, allowing his family to sneak past the border, and is shot. Sovanh and Chou, as the last of their family, finally walk through a field to Thailand, hand in hand.

== Production ==
Director and writer Denis Do was born in France and is of mixed French, Chinese and Cambodian heritage. The film is based on his own research and the memories of his mother, on whom the main protagonist, Chou, is based.

== Release ==
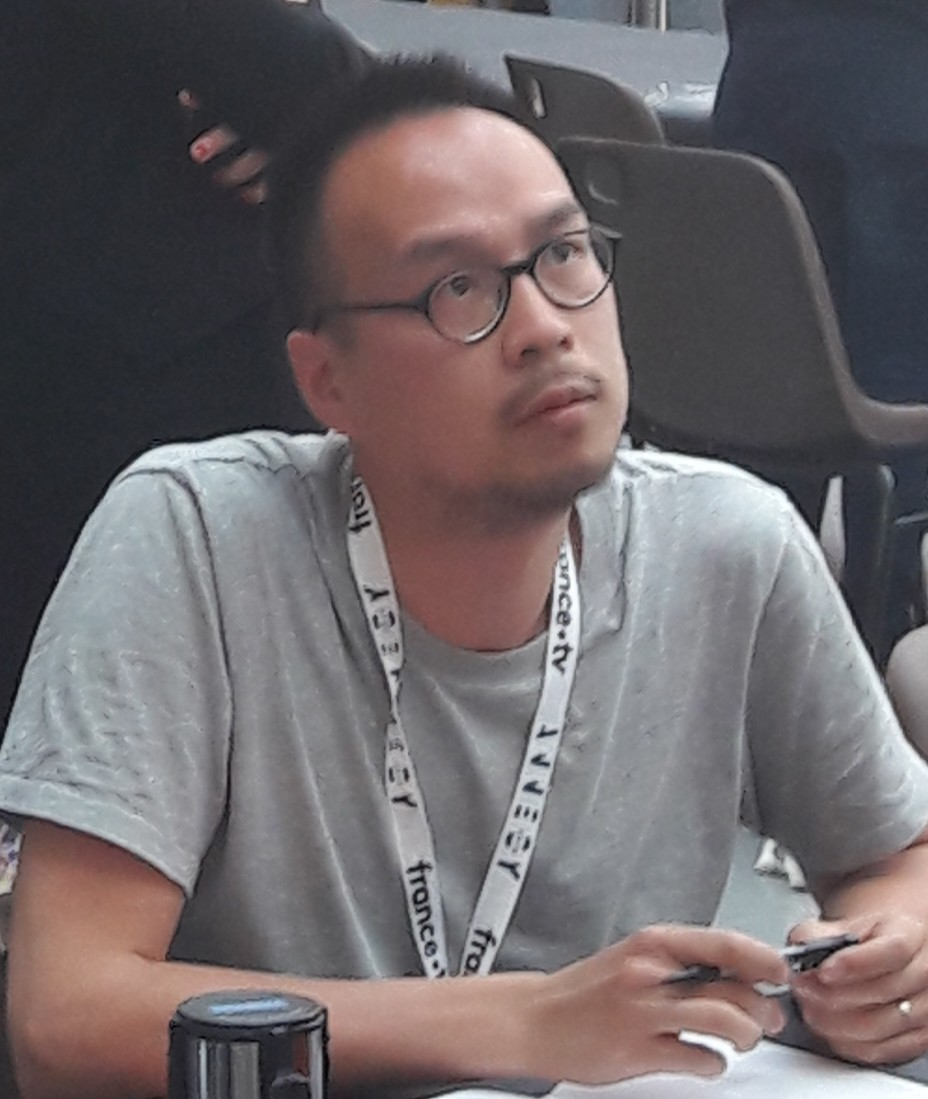
Director Denis Do at the 2019 Annecy International Animation Festival

The world premiere of the film was held on 11 June 2018, at that year's Annecy International Animation Film Festival, where it played in competition in the feature films category.

It was played at several other festivals throughout the remainder of 2018, including making its Australian premiere on October 17 at the Adelaide Film Festival and its North American premiere on 20 October in competition at the Animation Is Film Festival.

It was released nationally in cinemas on March 6, 2019, in France by Bac Films and on April 24, 2019, in Belgium by Lumière.

In English-speaking regions, it had a limited release beginning on 7 June 2019, in the United States distributed by GKIDS, in the original French with English subtitles only.

== Reception ==
On the review aggregator website Rotten Tomatoes, 93% of 28 critics' reviews are positive, with an average rating of 7.4/10. Metacritic, which uses a weighted average, assigned the film a score of 79 out of 100, based on 9 critics, indicating "generally favorable" reviews.

=== Accolades ===
Funan was well received by juries and audiences at festivals, winning several awards.

It won the Cristal for a Feature Film (the jury's top prize for the category) at the Annecy Festival, both the jury's Grand Prize and the Audience Award at the Animation Is Film Festival and the second-place Jury Prize (behind This Magnificent Cake! winning the BIAF Grand Prize) in the Feature Film category of the 20th Bucheon International Animation Festival.

It received four nominations for the 2nd Emile Awards, held on 8 December 2018, of which Best Writing in a Feature Film was won by Denis Do and Magali Pouzol for their work on the film and Best Sound Design in a Feature Film by Nicolas Leroy, Michel Schillings and Nicolas Tran Trong for theirs.
