= True North (2020 film) =

2020 animated film by Eiji Han Shimizu

- Japanese: トゥルーノース
- Indonesian: True North
- Directed by: Eiji Han Shimizu
- Written by: Eiji Han Shimizu
- Produced by: Eiji Han Shimizu
- Starring: Sammy T. Anderson; Jacquelyn Palmquist; Michael Sasaki; Ann Smith; Joel Sutton; Zachary Westerman
- Edited by: Eiji Han Shimizu
- Music by: Matthew Wilder
- Production companies: Sumimasen Pte. Ltd. (in Japan); Studio Raboon (in Indonesia)
- Distributed by: Toei Video
- Release dates: 15 June 2020 (Annecy International Animation Film Festival, France); 4 June 2021 (Japan)
- Running time: 93 minutes
- Countries: Japan; Indonesia
- Language: English

True North (Japanese: トゥルーノース) is a 2020 Japanese-Indonesian 3D animated film written, edited, directed and produced by a South Korean-Japanese filmmaker Eiji Han Shimizu, co-produced by Sumimasen led by Shimizu and Studio Raboon.

It is based on years of research and interviews with former political prisoners who defected to South Korea by Shimizu, depicting a family held captive in a prisons in North Korea in English. Produced over 10 years, spent on funding and gathering collaborators over 5 years of that.

The film was screened at the 2020 Annecy International Animation Film Festival, nominated for feature films contrechamp in competition.

== Plot ==
Park Yohan, a nine-year-old boy living in Pyongyang, his mother, and his younger sister are forcibly relocated to a notoriously cruel political prison camp in North Korea. His parents are Zainichi Koreans in the 1960s. His innocence is gradually eroded by the harsh brutality of the camp, while the rest of his family tries to maintain their decency and compassion for their fellow humans. Years later, after being devastated by the sudden and tragic loss of a loved one, he begins to reassess the meaning of his life - even as he struggles to survive in the worst imaginable living conditions.

== Voice cast ==
- Joel Sutton as Park Yohan
- Michael Sasaki as Insu
- Brandin Stennis
- Emily Helles

== Reception ==
- The Hollywood Reporter: "A rare glimpse inside a North Korean prison camp. This tale is for anyone interested in learning more about one of the world's most blatant crimes against humanity."
- Comic Book Resources: "TRUE NORTH will make you righteously angry, but it also manages to leave you with some sense of hope."
- Rotten Tomatoes: "Through this young boy's eyes we witness the worst and the best of humanity. Proving once again that the medium can do more than children's content, the animation here helps the subject matter leave a strong emotional mark and enables the filmmaker to access an unseen reality."
