= My Sunny Maad =

- French release poster
- Directed by: Michaela Pavlátová
- Produced by: Ron Dyens
- Release date: 14 June 2021 (Annecy Festival)
- Running time: 85 minutes
- Countries: Czech Republic; Slovakia; France
- Language: French
- Box office: $64,162

My Sunny Maad (Czech: Moje slunce Mad), (French: Ma famille afghane) is a 2021 animated drama film directed by Michaela Pavlátová.

== Plot ==
Herra is a Czech student. She meets Nazir, who is Afghan, and they fall in love. Nazir has to return to Afghanistan, and Herra decides to accompany him; they get married there. However the couple is childless, which greatly disappoints Nazir's family. An aunt then brings Herra, Maad, an abandoned child, so that they can adopt her.

Nazir finds a job as a driver for a Western NGO. When his employers discover that he has a European wife, they offer to hire him to work as an interpreter in their gynecological clinic.

Kaiz, the husband of Nazir's sister Freshta, decides to marry his daughter Roshangol to a much older man. The young woman refuses and eventually runs away. Kaiz's family forces him to divorce Freshta and take their children from her.

Nazir refuses to collaborate with the Taliban, and he is killed by a bomb planted in his car.

Freshta decides to leave Afghanistan with one of the doctors working for the NGO. Herra also wants to leave, but ultimately decides to stay because Maad prefers to remain in Afghanistan.

== Accolades ==
The feature was nominated for the Golden Globe Award for Best Animated Feature Film.

It also won the Cesar Award for Best Animated Film.
