= Moon Hotel Kabul =

2018 film directed by Anca Damian

- Theatrical release poster
- Directed by: Anca Damian
- Screenplay by: Anca Damian; Lia Bugnar
- Produced by: Anca Damian; Tom Dercourt; Sophie Erbs; Codin Maticiuc; Frantz Richard
- Starring: Florin Piersic Jr.; Ofelia Popii; Adrian Titieni; Alexandru Nagy; Rodica Negrea
- Cinematography: Dominique Colin
- Edited by: Basile Belkhiri
- Music by: Romain Trouillet
- Production companies: Aparte Film; Cinéma Defacto
- Release dates: 18 October 2018 (Warsaw Film Festival); 30 November 2018 (Romania)
- Running time: 100 minutes
- Language: Romanian
- Budget: €800,000
- Box office: $2,577

Moon Hotel Kabul is a 2018 Romanian-French drama film directed by Anca Damian and written by Damian and Lia Bugnar. It tells the story of Ivan (played by Florin Piersic Jr.), a charismatic but cynical journalist who starts to reconsider his life after Ioana (played by Ofelia Popii), a translator with whom he has had a one-night stand in a hotel in Kabul, commits suicide one day later. The film was shot in 2016, in Bucharest and Morocco, "as it was too risky to shoot in Kabul at that time".

The film premiered on October 18, 2018, at the Warsaw Film Festival where Damian received the Best Director award. It was theatrically released in Romanian on November 30, 2018. At the 2019 Gopo Awards, Alexandru Nagy was nominated for Best Actor in a Supporting Role, and Popii and Rodica Negrea were nominated for Best Actress in a Supporting Role.
