= Iron Kid =

Animated television series

- Russian DVD cover
- Also known as: Eon Kid
- Genre: Science fiction; Action; Adventure; Superhero
- Countries of origin: South Korea; Spain
- Original languages: Korean; Spanish
- No. of episodes: 26 (Note: In the United States, 25 episodes were aired.)

Production
- Running time: 23 minutes
- Production companies: BRB Internacional; Daewon C.I.; Design Storm; Televisión Española

Original release
- Network: KBS2
- Release: 6 April – 28 September 2006
- Network: La 2
- Release: 2006 – 2007

Iron Kid (or Eon Kid) is an animated television series produced by Daewon C.I. and Design Storm in South Korea and BRB Internacional and Televisión Española (TVE) in Spain.

The series is known as Iron Kid (Korean: 아이언 키드) in South Korea, and is broadcast under that name in Spain, South Africa, the United Kingdom and Ireland. It is broadcast as Eon Kid in the United States and other English-speaking countries.

The series premiered in South Korea on KBS2 on 6 April 2006, and in Spain on La 2 in late 2006. In the United States, it is distributed by Manga Entertainment and premiered on The CW's Saturday morning Kids' WB block on 22 September 2007.

== Characters ==
=== Eon family ===
The Eon family is the legendary family that defeated the General. Only Eon, Marty, and his father have been mentioned, but all members are great warriors and martial artists. The General's forces wiped out the family through the years, leaving Marty as the sole blood heir to the family legacy. Their ancestral home is a huge fortress surrounded by a bamboo forest. Underneath the home is the family's ancestral training ground that includes wood training drones and tests to hone the family's martial arts skills. The home has fallen into great disrepair since the death of Marty's father.

- Eon – Eon was the hero who ended the Second Robot War by destroying the General, but unfortunately he died in the process. His weapon, later called the Fist of Eon, was passed down through his family for 100 years. He has only spoke to Marty once, although it was a hologram of him that actually spoke to him in The Temple of the Iron Soul where he once trained to learn control of the fist.
- Martin (Marty) – Marty, or Iron Kid, is the lead character of the series. While scavenging for robot parts to sell he finds the Fist of Eon and puts it on, although unwillingly. Marty later discovers that he is a direct descendant of Eon, who 100 years prior to the series' start defeated the General and ended the Robot War. Endowed with the power of the Fist, he must fight the evil forces of the General. He was originally named Iron Kid in the original Korean version. Marty is the last descendant of the Eon family and is also the last heir of Eon. He is the final carrier of the Fist. He's shown to possess a natural talent for fighting and grows stronger as the series goes on.
- Gaff – An ancient robot who has served the Eon family for more than 130 years. He safeguarded the fist for one hundred years until its successor, Marty, was found. Somewhat a mentor to Marty, has watched over the Eon family for years and defended the family from the General's forces as best he could. His weapon is the Dragon Sword.
- Master Zhang – An unofficial member of the Eon family, Master Zhang waited for the Fist's successor at the family's ancestral home. He is a martial artist master who has trained several generations of the Eon family. Although he is quite old, he is still a formidable teacher and opponent but can be quite silly.
- Charlie – Charlie is another unofficial member of the Eon family. It is revealed that he was the administrator of the Eon family, a student of Marty's biological father, and perhaps his best friend. During an attack he flees with Marty and raises him as his own, per his real father's instructions. He was later captured by Black Beauty shortly after Marty flees to Crystal City and he was freed after Marty defeated the General.
- Marty's father – While his name was not revealed. he is seen in multiple episodes, most notably his final moments against Scar and his army of ninjas.

=== Marty's friends ===
- Ally — A mysterious girl who runs into Marty and becomes his friend. She is the adoptive daughter of Duke Von Rhymer. She has the ability to read and decipher the computer code that was used to make the General and other robotic creations during that time. Most of her life has been spent in the Iron Tower, but she quickly adapts to the outside world and becomes Marty's close friend and also crush and likes him back.
- Buttons — Marty's robotic dog and good friend. He constantly talks too much and provides great comic relief. He has a stretched out tail, that stretches super far, and by twisting his ear, it puts him on bark mode.

=== Government Central Defence Federation (CDF) ===
- Captain Magnum — The leader of a group of soldiers in the Central Federation Army. He and his troops wear blue armor. He brought Marty to the government's attention. His weapons are a pair of cannons mounted in his arms and a set of missiles hidden within his upper body armor. He is a robot created by the CDF.
- Violet — A special agent and spy for the CDF. She infiltrates the Iron Tower and discovers the General's resurrection. She later tutors Ally and becomes her good friend and surrogate big sister. She uses purple force fields and some purple attacks launched from her hands (an example was seen during her battle against Steeljaw Jack). She is a robot created by the CDF.
- Shadow — A rehabilitated criminal who now works for the CDF. He has 108 combat weapons and is an expert at covert ops. He was reprogrammed after an 18-month hunt for him, only Captain Magnum was able to subdue him. He is 99% loyal as he sometimes forgets which side he is on, and could constantly change as he did once while fighting the invincible lords, and he saved Marty from falling but then almost released him.
- Chief Gibson — The leader of the CDF. He is the one in charge of all the operations and duties of the soldiers and makes all the decisions about what to do, although sometimes his decisions come too late. He has access to the vault where the General's mechanical heart is stored in the top floor.
- Kelly — Chief Gibson's secretary and right-hand woman. She does all the research for Chief Gibson and is the main speaker who briefs the leaders of the CDF forces in.

The ace squadrobots — A squadron of robots for the CDF that can turn into mini planes with rockets.

=== The General's forces ===
- General (or Great General Kaiser (Korean: 대장군 카이저; RR: Daejanggun Kaijeo) in the Korean version) — The General was the ultimate robot in his day who ended the first Robot War that involved the Gigantors. He was created by a pooling of the world's greatest technology around a supernatural human brain. The experiment was a success, but the General started the Second Robot War when he decided robots were superior and he should rule. The Second Robot War ended with his defeat 100 years before the series began when Eon used his mighty fist to destroy him in a suicide attack. Unfortunately the General's brain survived and was saved by his followers. Since his defeat his followers have worked in secret to collect his many pieces and rebuild him so that they can once again take over the world. However, since his defeat, the General lost his sense of honor and resorted to more harsh methods like using the very Gigantor he was built to destroy. He has a red coating which is so powerful even light cannot enter it. Also using his red force field gave headaches to the CDF troops and then killed them. Note: In the English version of the series, he was infrequently called 'General Khan' before a second character named Khan was formally introduced in the episode 'The Fall of Iron Tower'.
- Doctor Chen — An evil man who was a CDF scientist named Wayne Wang who secretly left abandoned and betrayed the organization with the General's heart. Years later, Chen personally spearheads the General's reconstruction, later becoming his chief strategist when he sets out to take over the world. After Ally took control over The Giganator he escaped and was never seen anymore.
- Khan — Khan is second-in-command only to the General himself, following him out of honor. During the Robot War, he was unstoppable like in taking out an entire Federation battalion alone. He acts as a leader to the General's forces after his defeat until he is rebuilt, with Khan horrified of his leader's new outlook. He mainly battles using his fighting skills and brute strength, but is also capable of creating winds from his hand that either pull or push his enemies, and can fire a set of rockets from his shoulder armor. Sometimes he'll arm himself with a personal convoy of heavy infantry missile packs worn on both arms to fight colossal threats such as the Giganator.
- The Four Invincible Lords—The four invincible lords are four of the General's most powerful allies (also his henchmen). They are each named after a weather condition; Lightning, Rain, Wind, and Cloud. They are quite large and carry abilities that link them to their names. They each are designed with gold-colored armour and red and orange flame patterned loincloths. There is one female robot and three males. Combined they can create a powerful storm. The robot named Lighting uses his blade to fire attacks, Rain uses his two shields which have spikes on them, Wind (the most powerful member and leader of the Four Invincible Lords) uses some ropes to fight and Cloud uses a large club in battle.
- Black Beauty — A kunoichi robot whose main goal is to take the Fist of Eon from Marty and is a rival to Gaff who defeated her while Marty was training. She was at the General's side during the Robot War and never let a target escape. She leads an army of black-armored ninja robots and fights with the black knife, the black dagger, the black decker, her secret sword, the black sword, and other daggers and illusion powers.
- Scar — Scar was one of the General's most trusted fighters during the Robot Wars, a rival of Black Beauty's in rank and has his own personal lackeys. His past is shrouded in mystery and no one knows where he came from. However he and his ninjas are responsible for wiping out all of the eon family except for Marty. He carries two large axes that he uses for battle. He is also equipped with battle claws that have an organic toxin that he uses when in close combat against other robots. He was eventually defeated for good by Marty while he was under the influence of the Fist of Eon.
- Eiger — Eiger is an enormous robot who was the General's most powerful warrior. He was encased in ice by Eon 100 years ago. As a statue of ice he is easily recognizable at the entrance to the Temple of the Iron Soul in the Mystic Glacier. When Marty comes near the glacier the ice is melted from the sheer power of the fist, with Eiger attacking Marty under the assumption that he was Eon. But in the end, Marty defeats him. His strongest skill is the ability to create a snow storm which he uses against Marty but Marty uses his meteor blast attack, finally killing him.
- Centaurs — Centaurs are the main component of the General's army. They are called his cavalry, resemble their mythological counterparts and are led by one with golden armor.
- The Giganator — A giant robotic creature with many weapons. Khan and the General tried to stop him but when the General was resurrected he uses Chen to bring back the Giganator and use it against the CDF.

=== Other villains ===
- Duke Von Rhymer— The evil chairman of the Iron Tower and Ally's stepfather. He was secretly helping Chen in rebuilding the General while carrying his own agenda involving the Gigantor. However, Von Rhymer was betrayed by Chen once the Gigantor is operational and ends up incarcerated in CDF.
- Steeljaw Jack — A robot created by Doctor Chen who currently sits atop the government's most wanted list as a hired mercenary. He is an accomplished fighter and has no match in the government forces. Though he overpowered Marty when he was sent to bring Ally back to the Iron Tower, Steeljaw Jack is defeated by the boy and Violet in their rematch. He drives a silver convertible that acts as his personal mode of transportation which resembles an Aston Martin. His design looks similar to Cad Bane from Star Wars: The Clone Wars.

=== Others ===
- Orange Mama – Orange Mama is the leader of the Orange Bandit, a group of outlaw robots that ravage the desert.
- George – A former robot fighting champion who helped Marty and Ally through the Orange Valley.
- Jenny – Orange Mama's granddaughter and a friend of Ally.
- The Bullybots – These three robots try to become master thieves like Espinoza, their idol and lead the good life. The group consists of Och, Tito, and Waddy. They follow Marty to try and steal the fist of Eon. They consider Buttons their boss, after he defeated them in a quick sparring match, and help out Marty and Buttons in the future.
- The White Monks – A group of small robots that guard the Temple of the Iron Soul. They worship Eiger and follow a very different story about him. They believe that he is Eiger the Patient, who 100 years ago, roamed the glaciers in search of enlightenment in which he came to a stop at the Temple of the Iron Soul and has since then waited patiently.
- The Great Espinoza – The greatest master thief amongst all robots and the idol of the three bullybots.
- Ranzi's Law – a gargantuan enemy Marty fights in the seventh episode.

== Voice cast ==
- Marty – Son Jeong Ah (Korean), Aidan Drummond (English)
- Ally – Bak Seon-yeong (Korean), Claire Renaud (English)
- Buttons – Lee In Seong (Korean), Andrew Toth (English)
- Duke von Rhymer – Garry Chalk (English)
- Violet – Chae Eui-jin (Korean), Cathy Weseluck (English)
- Chief Gibson – Lim Chae Heon (Korean), Scott McNeil (English)
- Gaff – Seong Wan Kyeong (Korean), Ron Halder (English)
- Eon – Lee Tockar (English)
- Och – Kim Il (Korean), Lee Tockar (English)
- Charlie – Scott McNeil (English)
- Tito – Yoon Se Woong (Korean) Evan Sabba (English)
- Waddy – Yang Seok Jeong (Korean) Glen Cross (English)
- Black Beauty – Nicole Oliver (English)
- Steeljaw Jack - Brian Drummond (English)

== History ==
Manga Entertainment announced the show as Iron Kid on September 8, 2005, and its initial coproduction partners Daewon C.I. (Korea), animation studio DesignStorm (Korea) and BRB Internacional (Spain). Screen21 and TVE were added as coproduction partners by January 2007. In January 2007, BRB Internacional signed Jetix Latin America to carry Iron Kid after Jetix had picked up the show for France and Spain. Famosa picked up toy licensing rights for the Iberian Peninsula, while Portugal video rights went to LNK.

As of 2019, the show has been airing on the free Pluto TV service in the United Kingdom until 2021. In the United States, it is viewable on Plex, Vudu, and Roku Channel. The entire series is also available on YouTube as "Iron Kid"

== Carriage ==
| Country /Market | Channel | Premiered |
|---|---|---|
| Spain | Clan | |
| Spain | TVE2 | |
| Spain | TVE | June 2006 |
| Spain | Jetix (Spain) | November 18, 2006 |
| France | Jetix (France) | |
| France | France 3 | |
| South Korea | KBS | April 6, 2006 |
| Latin America | Jetix (Latin America) | |
| US | Kids' WB | September 22, 2007 |
| UK | Disney XD (UK and Ireland) | 2009 |
| Hong Kong; Macau | TVB Kids | September 17, 2008 |
| Pakistan | Cartoon Network (Pakistan) | 2007 |
| India | Cartoon Network (India) | 2008 |
| Japan | Animax (Japan) | December 10, 2010 |
| The Netherlands | Nicktoons (Dutch TV channel) | |
| Australia | Network 10 | September 23, 2008 |
| Middle East | Spacetoon | June 4, 2007 |
| Colombia | Canal TRO | 2019 |
| Ireland | The Den (RTE2 block) | |
| Romania | Megamax | |
| Russia | Carousel | |
| Slovenia | Pop TV | |
| Portugal | SIC K | 2013 |
| Italy | Italia 1 | |
| Belgium | Nickelodeon (Dutch TV channel) | |
| Chile | Telecanal | 2020 |
| Hungary | Megamax | |
| Serbia | TV Ultra | |

== Merchandise ==
Eon Kid toys were produced by the company Playmates in the United States in the year 2007 in the form of action figures. Famosa picked up the license for toys and action figures that were sold in Europe and the company NewBoy in the Middle East. In the Middle East, a confectionery company called Sweetoon promoted and marketed Iron Kid in the form of cereal and milk products. Books were also released in South Korea by Daewon C.I. A video game was also released in South Korea on the Game Boy Advance.

== Home video releases ==
Anchor Bay Entertainment released Eon Kid on DVD in the United States and Australia. DVDs were also released in Spain, Brazil, the Netherlands, Hungary and the Middle East. The series was also streamed on Netflix in the United States and Canada. It is now streaming on Amazon Video in the United States, Canada and the United Kingdom (where it is known as Iron Kid). Episodes have also been streamed on YouTube on Animakids, a channel owned by BRB Internacional who made the show. The show was released on DVD in South Africa by Impact Video.

== Live stage show ==
There was a live musical show based on Iron Kid that was performed from August 4, 2006, to August 20, 2006, in South Korea.

== Episodes ==
There are 26 episodes

1. - The Legendary Fist (Korean: 전설의 철권)
2. - The Heir to the Fist (Korean: 전설의 계승자)
3. - The Journey Begins (Korean: 여정의 시작)
4. - Strength Isn't Everything (Korean: 마티의 카운터펀치)
5. - Ally's Secret (Korean: 40인의 폭주단)
6. - Orange Mama (Korean: 지하도시 오랜지벨리)
7. - The Grand Wrestling Tournament (Korean: 대사막 지하격투대회)
8. - Marty the Iron Kid (Korean: 폭주왕 투야)
9. - Escape From the Orange Valley (Korean: 오랜지벨리 탈출작전)
10. - The Maxes Attack (Korean: 맥스단의 역습)
11. - Confronting Fate (Korean: 마티의 비밀)
12. - The 18 Woodenmen (Korean: 비밀수련장의 18봉인)
13. - A Hero is Born (Korean: 탄생 철권의 전사)
14. - To the Iron Tower (Korean: 아이언타워를 향하여)
15. - Hang On, Ally! (Korean: 초거대병기의 부활)
16. - Fall of the Tower (Korean: 아이언타워의 함락)
17. - Nightmares (Korean: 악몽)
18. - Out of Control (Korean: 철권의 폭주)
19. - The Four Lords of Invincibility (Korean: 신비로운 빙하)
20. - The Temple of the Iron Soul (Korean: 하얀 수도승)
21. - The General Awakes (Korean: 권신의 탄생)
22. - The God of the Glacier (Korean: 설원의 거신 아이거)
23. - The Revolt of Kahn (Korean: 칸의 반란)
24. - To the Iron Tower! Charge! (Korean: 총진격 아이언타워)
25. - The Last Battle, I (Korean: 최후의 결전(전편))
26. - The Last Battle, II (Korean: 최후의 결전(후편))

== Reception ==
Common Sense Media gave the show 3 out of 5 stars and the disclaimer: "Robotic arm points to adventure, fantasy violence."

== Soundtrack ==
Javier Mellado composed and orchestrated the music. The theme song for the version broadcast in Europe is called Wonder Boy by Erik Nilsson. While in the Korean version, the theme song is known as Run to the Sky and is performed by M.C the Max. The Italian theme song titled "Iron Kid" was performed by Antonio Di Vincenzo.

== Video game ==
A video game adaptation of the same name was released for the Game Boy Advance in 2007 exclusively in South Korea.

== See also ==
- Aeni
- DesignStorm's webpage
- BRB Internacional
- Daewon Media
- Manga Entertainment
