= Michaela Pavlátová =

Czech animator and film director

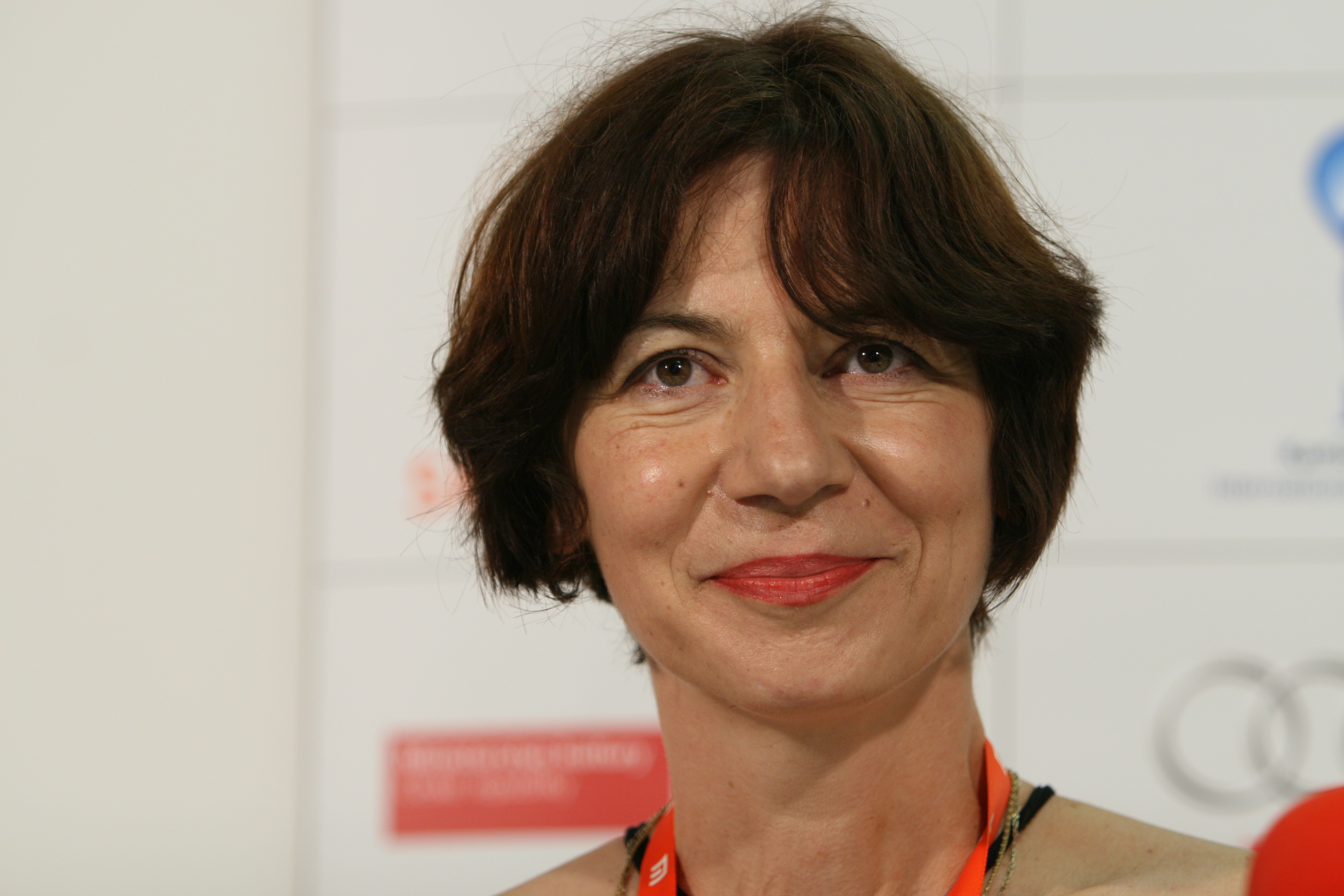
- Pavlátová at the 2008 Karlovy Vary International Film Festival
- Born: 27 February 1961 (age 64); Prague, Czechoslovakia
- Education: Academy of Arts, Architecture and Design in Prague
- Occupation(s): Animator; Film director
- Years active: 1987–present
- Website: michaelapavlatova.com

Michaela Pavlátová (born 27 February 1961) is a Czech animator, film director and teacher. She was nominated for an Academy Award for Best Animated Short Film for Words, Words, Words (1991) and won the Short Film Golden Bear for Repete (1995). As a feminist experimental animator Michaela's work explores themes of sex, gender, philosophy and relationality. Beyond her independent work she worked as the art director for Wildbrain Inc. She currently teaches animation at the Academy of Performing Arts, film and TV School in Prague. Michaela has also taught at the Academy of Arts, Architecture, and Design in Prague, the Academy of Art College, Computer Arts Institute in San Francisco and at Harvard University in Prague.

== Education ==
Michaela attended the Academy of Arts, Architecture and Design in Prague.

== Accolades ==
Reci, Reci, Reci was nominated for the 1992 Academy Award for Best Animated Short.

Her awards for the short animated film Repete include the Golden Bear, the Special Jury Prize at Annecy and the Grand Prix at the Hiroshima International Animation Festival. She won the Cristal Annecy in 2012 for her short film Tram, which was also short-listed for an Academy Award.

Her film 2021 My Sunny Maad was nominated for the Golden Globe Award for Best Animated Feature Film.

== Selected filmography ==
=== Animation films ===
- Reci, Reci, Reci (Words, Words, Words) (1991)
- Repete (1995)
- This Could Be Me (1996)
- Carnival of Animals (2006)
- Tram (2012)
- Mario And The Magician (2014)
- My Sunny Maad (2021)

=== Live action films ===
- Prague Stories (1999) - Director and writer
- Faithless Games (2003) - Director
- Night Owls (2008) - Director and writer
