= Anca Damian =

Romanian film director

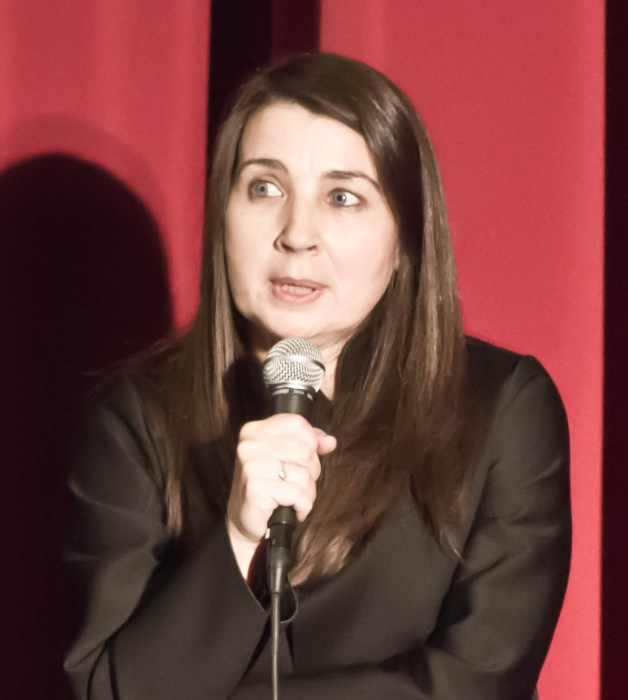
- Damian during the Crossing Europe 2012 festival
- Born: Cluj-Napoca, Romania
- Occupations: Film director; writer; producer
- Years active: 1992–present

Anca Damian is a Romanian film director, writer, and producer.

== Career ==
She has directed the film Marona's Fantastic Tale (2019), as well as the film Moon Hotel Kabul, for which she won the Best Director award at the Warsaw International Film Festival.

She also has an upcoming project involving the topic of albinism, titled Starseed.

== Partial filmography ==
=== Feature films ===
- Marona's Fantastic Tale (2019)
- Moon Hotel Kabul (2018)
- The Magic Mountain (2015)
- Crulic: The Path to Beyond (2011)

=== Short films ===
- Motherhood (2026)
