= Simon Rouby =

French film director

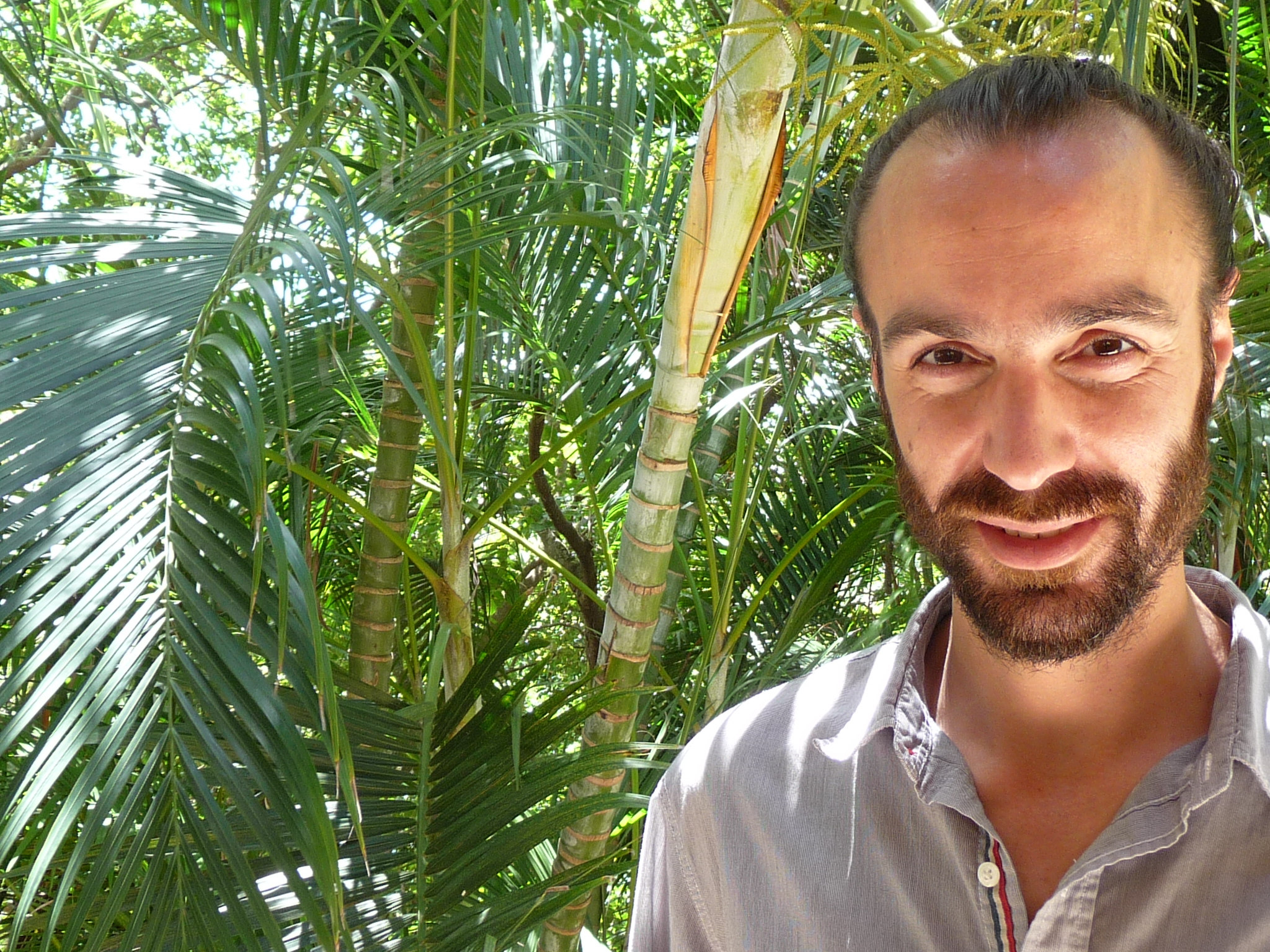
- Born: 1980 (age 45–46); Lyon, France
- Years active: 2007–present
- Website: www.simonrouby.com

Simon Rouby is a French director of animated films.

== Biography ==
Simon Rouby was born in Lyon, France, in 1980. At a very young age, he learned how to paint and sculpt. He studied drawing for two years at École Émile-Cohl and later decided to pursue animation at Ecole des Gobelins in Paris before leaving to study at Calarts in Los Angeles, US. These studies allowed him to direct his first short films: Blindspot and Le Présage in the same year. In 2010, he directs La Marche, another short film, produced by Naïa Productions. La Marche is selected in several animation festivals in France and abroad. In 2011, he started working with the scriptwriter Julien Lilti on the conception of his first feature film, Adama, which was released in 2015. Simon Rouby is interested in hybrid animation techniques, notably mixing sculpture with CGI modeling.

== Filmography ==
- 2007 : Blindspot (animated short film, Gobelins)
- 2007 : Le Présage (animated short film, Calarts)
- 2010 : La Marche (animated short film, Naïa Productions)
- 2015 : Adama (animated feature film, Naïa Productions and Pipangaï Productions)
