= Chae Eui-jin =

South Korean voice actress

- Occupation: Voice actress
- Employers: Tooniverse; Munhwa Broadcasting Corporation

Korean name
- Hangul: 채의진
- RR: Chae Uijin
- MR: Ch'ae Ŭijin

Chae Eui-jin (Korean: 채의진) is a South Korean voice actress who joined the Tooniverse Voice Acting Division in 1997, which she left for the Munhwa Broadcasting Corporation's Voice Acting Division in 1999.

== Roles ==
=== Broadcast TV ===
- Futari wa Pretty Cure (Korea TV Edition, SBS)
- Magical DoReMi (Magical Remi from 1st - 3rd Series, Korea TV Edition, MBC and 4th series, Korea TV Edition, Tooniverse)
- CSI: Crime Scene Investigation (extra guest, Korea TV Series, MBC)
- CSI: Miami (extra guest, Korea TV Edition, MBC)
- Chobits (Korea TV Edition, Tooniverse)
- Dr. Slump (Korea TV Edition, MBC)
- Bikkuriman (Bumerang Fighter, Korea TV Edition, MBC)
- Wa E-Nice World (narration, MBC)
- TV Clinic (narration, KBS)
- E3 Game (narration, MBC Game)
- Gangbada (Korea TV Edition, MBC)
- Dolphin Plliper (Korea TV Edition, MBC)
- Dog Charlie (Korea TV Edition, MBC)
- Metal Jack (Korea TV Edition, Tooniverse)
- Wangbawoo (Korea TV Edition, MBC)
- Doraemon (Korea TV Edition, MBC)
- Mononoke Hime (Korea TV Edition by OVA, Tooniverse)
- Glass Mask (Korea TV Edition, Tooniverse)
- Hit 50 Years (Radio Drama, MBC)
- Cartoon Fight (Radio Drama in Hotel Africa, MBC)
- Iron Kid (KBS)
- Winx Club (SBS) - Musa
- The Powerpuff Girls (Cartoon Network) (Bubbles)
- Powerpuff Girls Z (Cartoon Network)(Sara Bellum, Peach, Lil' Arturo, Miko Shirogane, Kuriko Akatsutsumi)

=== Film dubbing ===
- What Women Want (Korea TV Edition, MBC)
- Bucsy (Korea TV Edition, MBC)
- Antonia's Line (Korea TV Edition, MBC)
- Bring it On (Korea TV Edition, MBC)
- Random Hearts (Korea TV Edition, MBC)
- Sim Dong (Korea TV Edition, MBC)
- Entrapment (Korea TV Edition, MBC)
- Yulee's Gold (Korea TV Edition, MBC)
- Dark City (Korea TV Edition, MBC)
- There's Something About Mary (Korea TV Edition, MBC)
- Nick of Time (Korea TV Edition, MBC)
- Twilight (Korea TV Edition, MBC) (Replacing Kristen Stewart)

=== Video games ===
- Sentimental Graffiti - Taeko Adachi
- Tokimeki Memorial - Rei Ijyuin / Miharu Tatebayashi

=== Other roles ===
- Asiana Airlines - Kids Club Magic Miles Friends
- Yoon's English
- KTF - Coloring Main Guide
- Seoul International Cartoon Festival - Just voice actor event

== See also ==
- Munhwa Broadcasting Corporation
- MBC Voice Acting Division
