= Crulic: The Path to Beyond =

- Romanian theatrical release poster
- Release dates: 11 August 2011 (Locarno Film Festival); 21 October 2011 (Romania); 1 December 2011 (Poland)
- Running time: 73 minutes
- Countries: Romania; Poland
- Language: Romanian
- Budget: 292,000 Euros

Crulic: The Path to Beyond (Romanian: Crulic - Drumul spre dincolo) is a 2011 Romanian-Polish adult animated biographical docudrama film, directed by Anca Damian and starring Vlad Ivanov. It tells the story of Claudiu Crulic, a Romanian citizen who died in a Polish prison while on a hunger strike. The film was made with a mix of techniques including hand-drawn animation and animated photographs. Artwork and animation was done at the animation studio DSG, by Dan Panaitescu, Raluca Popa, Dragos Stefan, Roxana Bentu and Tuliu Oltean. The film won the Cristal for Best Feature Film at the 2012 Annecy International Animated Film Festival.

== Synopsis ==
Claudiu Crulic is dead and recounts from beyond the grave how his mother and sister have difficulties recognising his body. He is significantly thinner than last time they saw him, and looks closer to 70 years old than his actual age of 33. Crulic had supported himself by buying goods in Poland and then selling them in his native Romania. In 2007 he was arrested for theft in Poland. At the time of the crime he had been in Italy. Crulic's protests were dismissed and his pleads to the Romanian consul for help were fruitless. Crulic began a hunger strike. Prison doctors dismissed signs of his deteriorating health. When they finally agreed to force-feed him, his lung was injured by a needle. After Crulic's death, authorities and the doctors deny responsibility.

== Production ==
Claudiu Crulic, a 33-year-old Romanian, was arrested for theft in Poland in 2007. Crulic asked the Romanian consulate in Poland for help, but when nothing happened he began a four-month hunger strike, which ended with his death from starvation in January 2008. The case received significant media attention and led to the resignation of the Romanian foreign minister and the recall of the consul in Poland. Three prison doctors were trialed for their responsibility in the death.

Anca Damian had debuted as a feature-film director in 2009. She became interested in Crulic's case and fascinated by the slow nature of a death caused by hunger strike. She therefore wanted to make a film which captured the emotional aspects of Crulic's death. Damian researched the case for one year. She interviewed Crulic's family, neighbours and co-prisoners, and was, unlike the journalists who wrote about the case, eventually allowed to read every page in the Polish police files. The film was produced by Damian's Romanian company Aparte Film and co-produced by the Polish company Fundacja Magellana. Further co-production support came from Editura Video and Kraków Festival Office. The film received financial support from the Romanian National Centre for Cinema, the Polish Film Institute, the Kraków Film Commission, the Romanian Ministry of Culture and Editura Video.

The film was made with a mix of techniques including hand-drawn animation, cutout animation from photographs, scanned documents, projection, stop motion and digital 3D. It was the first Romanian animated feature film in two decades, and the team of animators was formed specifically for the film. All the artwork and animation for the film were done at the animation and visual effects studio DSG, in Bucharest, by a team made of Dan Panaitescu, Raluca Popa, Dragos Stefan, Roxana Bentu and Tuliu Oltean, with Vlad Pascanu and Andrei Saraliischi. As a stylistic choice, Damian decided to use photos mixed with drawing, and to make the outlines of the drawings gradually thinner as Crulic comes closer to death. At the end of the film there is live-action news footage; Damian intended this to remind the viewer that the story did take place in the real world.

== Release ==
The film premiered at the 2011 Locarno International Film Festival. It was released in Romania on 21 October 2011 and in Poland on 1 December. It was not initially planned to be released theatrically in Poland, but after positive festival reactions, the Polish co-producer decided to give it a release. The Polish version was dubbed by Maciej Stuhr. The French release was on 12.12.2012, and the French version was dubbed by Vlad Ivanov and Sandrine Bonnaire. The movie was theatrically released also in Czech Republic, Italy, Hungary, Germany.

== Reception ==
Giuseppe Sedia of the Krakow Post compared the film to the journalistic comics of Chappatte, and the darkly humouristic sensibilities of the Romanian filmmaker Lucian Pintilie. Sedia wrote that the film "has, deservedly, been cherished across Europe." Jay Weissberg of Variety praised the artwork and Damian's straightforward style of storytelling, but had a reservation about how he sometimes found it difficult to process all information on the screen. Weissberg wrote: "Beautiful artwork and a powerful story are the key elements of animated docu Crulic — The Path to Beyond, recounting the Kafkaesque history of a Romanian man arrested in Poland and abandoned by everyone until his death following a hunger strike in 2008. ... Animation is especially appealing, featuring attractive watercolors and lovely washes forming the background to an imaginative use of drawings, cutouts and photos. Even if overloaded at times, the individual frames are beautifully rendered and clear, accompanied by Piotr Dziubek's seamless and understated compositions."

The film won the Special Mention Don Quixote at the Locarno Film Festival. The Romanian Filmmakers Union honoured it with its Grand Prix for best domestic film of 2011. It won the Cristal for Best Feature film at the 2012 Annecy International Animated Film Festival. It also received awards at the Cottbus, Warsaw, Jihlava, ASTRA Film Fest Sibiu, CPH DOX, Istanbul, FICUNAM and Gdynia film festivals.
