= My Beautiful Girl, Mari =

- Theatrical poster
- Hangul: 마리이야기
- RR: Mari iyagi
- MR: Mari iyagi
- Directed by: Lee Sung-gang
- Written by: Kang Su-jeong; Lee Sung-gang; Seo Mi-ae
- Produced by: Cho Sung-won
- Cinematography: Kwon Geun-wook
- Edited by: Park Gok-ji
- Music by: Lee Byung-woo
- Production companies: Daewoo Entertainment; Kuk Dong; Siz Entertainment
- Distributed by: Chungeorahm Film; ADV Films
- Release date: January 18, 2002
- Running time: 80 minutes
- Country: South Korea
- Language: Korean

My Beautiful Girl, Mari (Korean: 마리이야기; lit. 'The Story of Mari') is a 2002 South Korean animated film. It follows the story of a young boy during summer vacation and ascends into flights of surrealistic fantasy, which may or may not be dream sequences. The English-language dub was directed and produced by Carl Macek and licensed by A.D. Vision.

== Plot ==
Kim Nam-woo struggles through life as people around him constantly leave him; his best friend, Jun-ho, is going to study in Seoul and in some ways his widowed mother is "leaving" him too by paying more attention to her new boyfriend. To escape, he goes to a dream world, where he meets a girl named Mari. The story follows Nam-woo in discovering himself and maturing.

== Cast ==
Character	Korean voice actor	English voice actor
Nam-woo	Ryu Deok-hwan	Alejandro Fallick
Adult Nam-woo	Lee Byung-hun	Jay Hickman
Jun-ho	Sung In-gyu	Clint Bickham
Adult Jun-ho	Gong Hyung-jin	Chris Patton
Nam-woo's Mom	Bae Jong-ok	Christine Auten
Nam-woo's Grandma	Na Moon-hee	Shelley Calene-Black
Jun-ho's Father	Jang Hang-sun	John Swasey
Soog-Y	Lee Nari	Kira Vincent-Davis
Kyung-min	Ahn Sung-ki	Andy McAvin

== Awards ==
- Grand Prix Winner (Best Feature Film) at the 26th Annecy International Animation Film Festival (Annecy, France)
