= Ron Dyens =

French film producer

Ron Dyens (born 15 January 1970) is a French film producer and the founder of Sacrebleu Productions, established in 1999 in Paris. He received the Academy Award for Best Animated Feature in 2025 for producing Flow. Also, he has received three César Awards, for Flow, My Sunny Maad and L'heure de l'ours.

He has also been awarded the Knight of the National Order of Merit as well as Knight of the Order of Arts and Letters both in France, and Latvia's Order of the Three Stars, 3rd Class.
