= 1946 in animation =

Events in 1946 in animation.

== Events ==
=== January ===
- January 4: Terrytoons produces The Talking Magpies, in which Heckle and Jeckle make their debut.
- January 5: Bob Clampett's Book Revue premieres, produced by Warner Bros. Cartoons and starring Daffy Duck.

=== February ===
- February 2: Friz Freleng's Bugs Bunny cartoon Baseball Bugs premieres, produced by Warner Bros. Cartoons.

=== March ===
- March 7: 18th Academy Awards: Hanna-Barbera's Tom and Jerry cartoon Quiet Please!, produced by MGM's Cartoon Studio, wins the Academy Award for Best Animated Short.
- March 8: Jack Hannah's Goofy cartoon A Knight for a Day, produced by Walt Disney Animation Studios, premieres.
- March 9: Tex Avery's Lonesome Lenny premieres, produced by MGM's Cartoon Studio. It is the final Screwy Squirrel cartoon.
- March 16: Bob Clampett's Porky Pig and Daffy Duck cartoon Baby Bottleneck premieres, produced by Warner Bros. Cartoons.
- March 23: Frank Tashlin & Robert McKimson's Bugs Bunny and Elmer Fudd cartoon Hare Remover premieres, produced by Warner Bros. Cartoons. This was Tashlin's final cartoon for Warner Bros. as he had left to go write scripts for live-action films belonging to other movie companies such as Paramount Pictures, United Arts, & Columbia Pictures.
- March 30: Hanna-Barbera's Tom and Jerry cartoon Springtime for Thomas premieres, produced by MGM's Cartoon Studio. Also starring Butch and Toodles Galore (in which the latter marks her debut in).

=== April ===
- April 6: Robert McKimson's Daffy Duck and Porky Pig cartoon Daffy Doodles premieres, produced by Warner Bros. Cartoons.
  - This was McKimson's first solo cartoon for Warner Bros. that was released to the public, as he previously directed The Return of Mr. Hook (1944) exclusively for the U.S. Navy and co-directed the shorts Tale of Two Mice (1945) & Hare Remover (1946) with Frank Tashlin.
- April 20:
  - Jack Kinney, Clyde Geronimi, Hamilton Luske and Joshua Meador's Make Mine Music, produced by Walt Disney Animation Studios, is first released. It is an anthology film and consists of ten animated segments accompanied by music.
  - Robert McKimson's Hollywood Canine Canteen premieres, produced by Warner Bros. Cartoons, featuring caricatures of Hollywood actors as anthropomorphic dogs.

=== May ===
- May 4: Chuck Jones' final Sniffles cartoon Hush My Mouse premieres, produced by Warner Bros. Cartoons. This is the final Looney Tunes short to feature Porky Pig's iconic drum end card.
- May 16: The first Danish animated feature film, The Tinderbox, based on the fairy tale by Hans Christian Andersen and directed by Svend Methling, is first released.
- May 18: Hanna-Barbera's Tom and Jerry cartoon The Milky Waif premieres, produced by MGM's Cartoon Studio. The short marks the debut of Jerry's nephew Nibbles (who would later be renamed as Tuffy).
- May 25: Chuck Jones' Bugs Bunny cartoon Hair-Raising Hare is first released, produced by Warner Bros. Cartoons. It marks the debut of Gossamer.

=== June ===
- June 8: Bob Clampett's Porky Pig and Sylvester the Cat cartoon Kitty Kornered is first released, produced by Warner Bros. Cartoons.
- June 15: Tex Avery's The Hick Chick premieres, produced by MGM's Cartoon Studio.
- June 22: Friz Freleng & Hawley Pratt's Hollywood Daffy premieres, produced by Warner Bros. Cartoons, in which Daffy Duck visits Hollywood and meets and impersonates celebrity actors.
- June 28: Jack King's Donald Duck cartoon Donald's Double Trouble premieres, produced by Walt Disney Animation Studios. In it, Donald uses a well-mannered lookalike to make a good impression on Daisy Duck.
- June 29:
  - William Hanna and Joseph Barbera's Tom and Jerry cartoon Trap Happy premieres, produced by MGM's Cartoon Studio and also starring Butch.
  - Robert McKimson's first Bugs Bunny cartoon Acrobatty Bunny premieres, produced by Warner Bros. Cartoons.

=== July ===
- July 20: Bob Clampett's final & iconic Daffy Duck cartoon The Great Piggy Bank Robbery, produced by Warner Bros. Cartoons, is first released. Porky Pig makes a cameo as a tram driver.

=== August ===
- August 3: Tex Avery's Droopy cartoon Northwest Hounded Police, produced by MGM's Cartoon Studio.
- August 9: Jack King's Donald Duck cartoon Wet Paint premieres, produced by Walt Disney Animation Studios.
- August 30: Jack King's Donald Duck cartoon Dumb Bell of the Yukon premieres, produced by Walt Disney Animation Studios.
- August 31:
  - Robert McKimson's Walky Talky Hawky premieres, produced by Warner Bros. Cartoons. It marks the debuts of Foghorn Leghorn and his arch-nemesis Barnyard Dawg, also McKimson's first short starring Henery Hawk.
  - William Hanna and Joseph Barbera's Tom and Jerry cartoon Solid Serenade premieres, produced MGM's Cartoon Studio. Also starring Spike and Toodles Galore.

=== September ===
- September 6: George Pal's John Henry and the Inky-Poo premieres.
- September 14: Friz Freleng's Bugs Bunny cartoon Racketeer Rabbit is first released, produced by Warner Bros. Cartoons.
- September 20: Jack Hannah's Donald Duck cartoon Lighthouse Keeping premieres, produced by Walt Disney Animation Studios.
- September 28: Chuck Jones' Fair and Worm-er premieres, produced by Warner Bros. Cartoons.

=== October ===
- October 5: Bob Clampett's Bugs Bunny short The Big Snooze is first released. It is the final Warner Bros. Cartoons cartoon directed by Clampett before his retirement.
- October 26: Tex Avery's Henpecked Hoboes premieres, produced by MGM's Cartoon Studio which marks the debut of George and Junior.

=== November ===
- November 1: The Story of Menstruation, an educational film for young teenagers about menstruation produced by Walt Disney Animation Studios, premieres.
- November 1: The Donald Duck and Goofy cartoon Frank Duck Brings 'Em Back Alive is released by RKO Radio Pictures.
- November 2: Arthur Davis' first Porky Pig cartoon Mouse Menace premieres, produced by Warner Bros. Cartoons.
- November 9: Friz Freleng's Bugs Bunny cartoon Rhapsody Rabbit premieres, produced by Warner Bros. Cartoons.
- November 12: Song of the South, a film combining live-action and animation, is first released. The live-action scenes are directed by Harve Foster, while the animated scenes are directed by Wilfred Jackson and produced by Walt Disney Animation Studios. It marks the debut of the characters Br'er Rabbit, Br'er Fox and Br'er Bear who will become popular comic characters. However, decades later prior to the George Floyd protests in 2020, it became controversial due to being accused of promoting racial stereotypes and romanticizing slavery.

=== December ===
- December 20: Jack Hannah's Goofy cartoon Double Dribble premieres, produced by Walt Disney Animation Studios.

== Specific date unknown ==
- Karel Zeman's Podkova pro štěstí ("Horseshoe for Luck") premieres which marks the debut of Mr. Prokouk.

== Films released ==
- April 20 - Make Mine Music (United States)
- May 16 - The Tinderbox (Denmark)
- November 12 - Song of the South (United States)

== Births ==
=== January ===
- January 5: Diane Keaton, American actress (voice of Jenny in Finding Dory, Michellee Weebie-Am-I in Green Eggs and Ham), (d. 2025).
- January 19: Dolly Parton, American singer-songwriter, actress, philanthropist, and businesswoman (voice of Dolly Gnome in Gnomeo and Juliet, Katrina Murphy in The Magic School Bus episode "The Family Holiday Special", Noleen Hen in the Lily's Driftwood Bay episode "The Salty Chicken", herself in the Alvin and the Chipmunks episode "Urban Chipmunk" and The Simpsons episode "Sunday, Cruddy Sunday"), (d. 2026).
- January 20: David Lynch, American filmmaker (Six Men Getting Sick (Six Times)), visual artist, musician and actor (voice of Gus the Bartender in The Cleveland Show, Mad Scientist in Robot Chicken, all characters in DumbLand, himself in the Family Guy episode "How the Griffin Stole Christmas"), (d. 2025).

=== February ===
- February 2: Blake Clark, American actor and comedian (voice of Hogwash in The New Woody Woodpecker Show, RadioShack Walkie-Talkie in Eight Crazy Nights, Buford in Rango, Chief in Fish Hooks, Sheriff Cantaloupe and Asparagus in The High Fructose Adventures of Annoying Orange, Roland in Harvey Beaks, continued voice of Slinky Dog in the Toy Story franchise).
- February 14: Gregory Hines, American dancer, actor, choreographer and singer (voice of Big Bill in Little Bill), (d. 2003).
- February 19: Hiroshi Fujioka, Japanese actor (voice of Phantom in Pokémon Ranger and the Temple of the Sea, Japanese dub voice of Shan Yu in Mulan).
- February 20:
  - Sandy Duncan, American actress, comedian, dancer and singer (voice of Vixey in The Fox and the Hound, Firefly, Applejack and Medley in My Little Pony: Rescue at Midnight Castle, Peepers in Rock-a-Doodle, Queen Uberta in The Swan Princess, herself in The New Scooby-Doo Movies episode "Sandy Duncan's Jekyll and Hyde" and the Scooby-Doo and Guess Who? episode "The Dreaded Remake of Jekyll & Hyde!").
  - Brenda Blethyn, English actress (voice of Alice Fairgood in The Wild Thornberrys Movie, Mama Heffalump in the Winnie the Pooh franchise, Ethel Briggs in Ethel & Ernest, Grossmama in Charlotte).
- February 21:
  - Anthony Daniels, English actor (voice of C-3PO in the Star Wars franchise, Robot Chicken, The Lego Movie, and Ralph Breaks the Internet, Legolas in The Lord of the Rings).
  - Alan Rickman, English actor and director (voice of Joe in Help! I'm a Fish, Absolem in Alice in Wonderland and Alice Through the Looking Glass, King Philip in the King of the Hill episode "Joust Like a Woman"), (d. 2016).

=== March ===
- March 6: Jacques Verbeek, Dutch animator and comics artist (made animated films with Karin Wiertz), (d. 1993).
- March 12: Frank Welker, American voice actor (voice of Fred Jones in the Scooby-Doo franchise, Megatron and Soundwave in The Transformers and Transformers: Prime, Iceman in Spider-Man and His Amazing Friends, the title characters in Dynomutt, Dog Wonder and Jabberjaw, Hefty Smurf in The Smurfs, Brain, Dr. Claw, and Mad Cat in Inspector Gadget, Ray Stantz and Slimer in The Real Ghostbusters, Kermit in Muppet Babies, Bigtime and Baggy Beagle in DuckTales, Abu in Aladdin, Thaddeus Plotz, Ralph the Guard, Runt, Buttons, and Chicken Boo in Animaniacs, Nibbler in Futurama, Garfield in The Garfield Show, continued voice of Barney Rubble, Dino, and Scooby-Doo).
- March 18: Gary Dontzig, American television producer, screenwriter, and actor (W.I.T.C.H.), (d. 2026).
- March 21: Timothy Dalton, English actor (voice of Mr. Pricklepants in the Toy Story franchise, Ged/Sparrowhawk in Tales from Earthsea, Lord Milori in Secret of the Wings, Demanitus in Rapunzel's Tangled Adventure).
- March 29: Bob Richardson, American animator and producer (Popeye the Sailor, A Pup Named Scooby-Doo, Bobby's World).
- March 27: Carl Weintraub, American actor (voice of DeSoto in Oliver & Company).
- March 31: Dave Thomson, American animator and scene-planner (Walt Disney Animation Studios, Bebe's Kids, The Pagemaster, Cats Don't Dance), (d. 2021).

=== April ===
- April 8: Stuart Pankin, American actor (voice of Sultan Pasta Al-Dente in Aladdin, Donald Tannor in The Zeta Project, Condiment King in the Batman: The Animated Series episode "Make 'Em Laugh", additional voices in Hercules and The Brothers Flub).
- April 12: Ed O'Neill, American actor (voice of Mr. Litwak in Wreck-It Ralph and Ralph Breaks the Internet, Hank in Finding Dory, Grandpa in the Kick Buttowski: Suburban Daredevil episode "Truth or Daredevil", Mayor Thompson in the Handy Manny episode "Great Garage Rescue", Orson in The Penguins of Madagascar episode "Operation: Antarctica", Bud Swanson in the Family Guy episode "Papa Has a Rollin' Son").
- April 18: Hayley Mills, English actress (voice of The Little Mermaid in The Daydreamer, Hillary in A Troll in Central Park).
- April 19: Tim Curry, English actor and singer (voice of Taurus Bulba in Darkwing Duck, Captain Hook in Peter Pan and the Pirates, Hexxus in Ferngully: The Last Rainforest, Nigel Thornberry in The Wild Thornberrys, Forte in Beauty and the Beast: The Enchanted Christmas, Ben Ravencroft in Scooby-Doo and the Witch's Ghost, Joseph Chadwick in the Ben 10 franchise, Drake in The Pebble and the Penguin, Lord Dragonus in Mighty Ducks, Palpatine in Seasons 5 and 6 of Star Wars: The Clone Wars, Pretorius in The Mask: Animated Series, King Acorn in Sonic the Hedgehog, Professor Finbarr Calamitous in The Adventures of Jimmy Neutron, Boy Genius, Auntie Whispers in the Over the Garden Wall episode, "The Ringing of the Bell", Dr. Mystico in the Freakazoid episode "Island of Dr. Mystico", The Sorcerer in Randy Cunningham: 9th Grade Ninja, Dr. Anton Sevarius in Gargoyles, Zimbo (and additional voices) in Aaahh!!! Real Monsters, Prince in Garfield: A Tail of Two Kitties, Muthro Botha in the Batman Beyond episode "Final Cut", English dub voice of the Cat King in The Cat Returns), (d. 2026).
- April 22: John Waters, American filmmaker, writer, actor and artist (voice of John in The Simpsons episode "Homer's Phobia", Quetzalpacatlan in the Superjail! episode "Ghosts", Yeti Lobster in the Fish Hooks episode "Rock Yeti Lobster", Dr. Kelton in the Mr. Pickles episode "Coma", Captain Tom in the Clarence episode "Plane Excited", Wadworth Thorndyke the Third in the Mickey Mouse episode "The Fancy Gentleman").
- April 23: Michael Sporn, American animator and film director (Doctor DeSoto, The Man Who Walked Between the Towers) and producer (Michael Sporn Animation), (d. 2014).
- April 26: Claude Viseur, aka Clovis, Belgian comic artist and animator (Belvision), (d. 2018).
- April 29: Wayne Robson, Canadian actor (voice of Frank in The Rescuers Down Under), (d. 2011).
- April 30: Bill Plympton, American animator, graphic designer, cartoonist and filmmaker (Your Face, The Tune, I Married a Strange Person!, Mutant Aliens, Guard Dog, Hair High, Idiots and Angels, The Cow Who Wanted to Be a Hamburger, Cheatin', animated the couch gags for The Simpsons episodes "Beware My Cheating Bart", "Black Eyed, Please", "Married to the Blob", "Lisa the Veterinarian", "22 for 30", "3 Scenes Plus a Tag from a Marriage", "Manger Things" and "One Angry Lisa").

=== May ===
- May 1: Nellie Bellflower, American actress (voice of Princess Ariel in Thundarr the Barbarian, Danielle in The Flight of Dragons, Lady Boreal in Rudolph and Frosty's Christmas in July).
- May 6:
  - Larry Huber, American animator, television writer and producer (Hanna-Barbera, Ruby-Spears Enterprises, Nickelodeon Animation Studio, Danger Rangers, co-creator of ChalkZone).
  - Lulu Roman, American comedian and singer (voice of Lulu Ladybug in the Gaither's Pond episode "Fish Tales"), (d. 2025).
- May 10: Donovan, Scottish musician (voiced himself in the Futurama episode "The Deep South").
- May 13: Marv Wolfman, American comic book and television writer (Jem, The Transformers, Monster Force, ReBoot, Pocket Dragon Adventures, voiced himself in the Teen Titans Go! episodes "Marv Wolfman & George Perez" and "Creative Geniuses").
- May 20: Cher, American singer and actress (voice of Chercophonie in the Home: Adventures with Tip & Oh episode "Chercophonie" and herself in The New Scooby-Doo Movies episode "The Secret of Shark Island", the Scooby-Doo and Guess Who? episode "Cher, Scooby, and the Sargasso Sea!" and Bobbleheads: The Movie).

=== June ===
- June 1: Brian Cox, Scottish actor (voice of Dan Peabody in Fantastic Mr. Fox, Green Dragon in Scooby-Doo! and the Samurai Sword, Niander Wallace Sr. in Blade Runner: Black Lotus, Earl Garver in the Superman: The Animated Series episode "Two's A Crowd", Pariah Dark in the Danny Phantom episode "Reign Storm", Kostas Becker in The Simpsons episode "A Serious Flanders", Helm Hammerhand in The Lord of the Rings: The War of the Rohirrim).
- June 2: Tomomichi Nishimura, Japanese voice actor (voice of Steeljaw and Cyclonus in Transformers: The Headmasters, Clock Tower Keeper in Kiki's Delivery Service, Gail in Supernatural: The Animation, Kuru in Dragon Ball Super, Anzai in Slam Dunk, Narrator in YuYu Hakusho, Japanese dub voice of Topolino in Cars 2), (d. 2025).
- June 3: Tristan Rogers, Australian actor (voice of Jake in The Rescuers Down Under, Nohrin Officer in Delgo, Hawkins in The Real Adventures of Jonny Quest episode "Ndovu's Last Journey", Simon Harper in the Batman Beyond episode "Sentries of the Last Cosmos"), (d. 2025).
- June 19: Jennifer Darling, American actress (voice of Ayeka Masaki Jurai in Tenchi Muyo!, Pythona in G.I. Joe: The Movie, Irma in Teenage Mutant Ninja Turtles, Pixlee Trollsom and Deputroll Dolly in Trollkins, Angelica in The Gary Coleman Show, Amber in The Centurions, Muffet in Christmas in Tattertown, Wiggle in The Biskitts, Berkeley in Capitol Critters, Princess Sabina in The Smurfs).
- June 24: Robert Reich, American professor, author, lawyer and political commentator (voiced himself in The Simpsons episode "Poorhouse Rock").
- June 26: Ricky Jay, American stage magician, actor and writer (narrator in the Teen Titans Go! episode "Double Trouble", voiced himself in The Simpsons episode "The Great Simpsina"), (d. 2018).
- June 28:
  - Gilda Radner, American comedian and actress (voice of the Witch in Witch's Night Out, various characters in Animalympics), (d. 1989).
  - Bruce Davison, American actor (voice of Slade Wilson in Justice League: Crisis on Two Earths, Zuko in The Legend of Korra).

=== July ===
- July 6:
  - Sylvester Stallone, American actor and film director (voice of Corporal Weaver in Antz, Lieutenant Victor von Ion in Ratchet & Clank, Bulletman in Animal Crackers, Paul Revere in the Liberty's Kids episode "Midnight Ride").
  - Fred Dryer, American actor and former football player (voice of Sgt. Rock in the Justice League episode "The Savage Time").
- July 7: Joe Spano, American actor (voice of Agent Bennet in Batman Beyond, Mr. Osgood in the Static Shock episode "Jimmy").
- July 13: Cheech Marin, American actor (voice of Tito in Oliver & Company, Stump in FernGully: The Last Rainforest, Banzai in The Lion King franchise, Ramone in the Cars franchise, Mad Hog in Hoodwinked Too! Hood vs. Evil, Pancho Rodriguez in The Book of Life, Quita Moz in Elena of Avalor, Carlos Ramirez in the South Park episode "Cherokee Hair Tampons", himself in The Simpsons episode "A Midsummer's Nice Dream").
- July 14: Vincent Pastore, American actor (voice of Luca in Shark Tale, Terry in Aqua Teen Hunger Force, Mr. Castaneda in the Fillmore! episode "Code Name: Electric Haircut", Big Pussy in the Animals episode "Cats"), (d. 2026).
- July 15: Linda Ronstadt, American retired singer (voiced herself in The Simpsons episode "Mr. Plow", performed the song "Somewhere Out There" in An American Tail).
- July 16:
  - Dave Goelz, American puppeteer (voice of Subconscious Guard Frank in the Inside Out franchise, Mr. Caterpillar in the Ask the StoryBots episode "How Do Flowers Grow?").
  - Toshio Furukawa Japanese actor (voice of Piccolo in the Dragon Ball franchise).
- July 17: Giannalberto Bendazzi, Italian animation historian (Cartoons - 100 Years of Cinema Animation), (d. 2021).
- July 20: Bob Heatlie, Scottish songwriter, record producer and composer (The Trap Door, HIT Entertainment, Little Robots), (d. 2023).
- July 21: Timothy Harris, American author, screenwriter and producer (Space Jam, Astro Boy).
- July 22: Danny Glover, American actor, director and activist (voice of Barbatus in Antz, Jethro in The Prince of Egypt, President Chen in Battle for Terra, Professor Apollo in the Captain Planet and the Planeteers episode "Isle of Solar Energy", Krampus in the American Dad! episode "Minstrel Krampus").

=== August ===
- August 9: Alain Dorval, French voice actor (French dub voice of Pete in the Mickey Mouse franchise, Weaver in Antz, Tiger in the American Tail franchise, Victor in Ratchet & Clank, Lex Luthor in Superman: The Animated Series, Sylvester Stallone in Solar Opposites, voice of Goliath the Rhino in The Jungle Bunch), (d. 2024).
- August 12: Caroline Leaf, Canadian-American filmmaker, animator, director, producer, and tutor (Sand Animation).
- August 19: Ferenc Rófusz, Hungarian animator (The Fly).
- August 26: Rickie Sorensen, American actor (voice of Spotty in 101 Dalmatians, Arthur in The Sword in the Stone), (d. 1994).
- August 27: Yuriy Meshcheryakov, Russian-Ukrainian animator (The Tale of Tsar Saltan), (d. 2001).

=== September ===
- September 11: Julie Payne, American actress (voice of Liz Wilson in the Garfield franchise).
- September 22: Roberto Espriú Sen, Mexican actor and voice actor (Latin American voice of General White and Commander Red in Dragon Ball, Hercule Satan in Dragon Ball Z, Three Star Dragon in Dragon Ball GT, Boris in The Vision of Escaflowne, Baron Fullmoon in Gulliver Boy, Mr. Kerrigan in Steamboy), (d. 2024).
- September 26: Togo Igawa, Japanese actor (voice of Hiro in Thomas & Friends, Professor Moshimo in Robotboy).
- September 28: Jeffrey Jones, American actor (voice of Presidentman and Shadow Hog in Invader Zim, Uncle Crenshaw in Stuart Little, Warden in the Duckman episode "I, Duckman", Nivens and Vinnie in the Batman: The Animated Series episode "A Bullet for Bullock", Nurse and Man in White in the Aaahh!!! Real Monsters episode "This is Your Brain on Ickis", Detective Marcus in The Zeta Project episode "The Wrong Morph", Sir Swami in the Justice League episode "Legends").
- September 30: Fran Brill, American retired puppeteer (Sesame Street, The Muppet Show, Dog City, Big Bag) and actress (voice of Loretta LaQuigley and Mrs. Perigrew in Doug, Little Girl in the Sheep in the Big City episode "Baah-Dern Times", Eliza and Elisa Stitch in the Courage the Cowardly Dog episode "The Quilt Club", Lightening Snail and List Text in the Wallykazam! episode "Dragon Hiccups", Bluejay and Sparrow in the HBO Storybook Musicals episode "The Tale of Peter Rabbit").

=== October ===
- October 2: Dale Soules, American actress (voice of Darby Steel in Lightyear, Agatha in Digman!).
- October 4: Susan Sarandon, American actress and activist (portrayed and voiced Queen Narissa in Enchanted, voice of Miss Spider in James and the Giant Peach, Mrs. Clark in Our Friend, Martin, Golden Queen in Skylanders Academy, the Narrator in Goodnight Moon and Other Sleepy Time Tales, Coco LaBouche in Rugrats in Paris: The Movie, Chimène in April and the Extraordinary World, Barb the Angel in Hell and Back, Bananny in Spark: A Space Tail, Lorraine in My Entire High School Sinking Into the Sea, Aunt Agatha and Mom Shopper in Neo Yokio, Dr. Wong in Rick and Morty, Mom in Fearless, Ballet Teacher in The Simpsons episode "Homer vs. Patty and Selma", Mrs. Jasperterian in the American Dad! episode "Portrait of Francine's Genitals", Louise, Chloe, Gen Z Advertising Executive and Handmaid in the Robot Chicken episode "Ginger Hill in: Bursting Pipes", herself in The Simpsons episode "Bart Has Two Mommies", Fishionary in Courage the Cowardly Dog episode "Fishy Business").
- October 6: John Hostetter, American actor (voice of Bazooka in G.I. Joe: A Real American Hero, Honda in Tekkaman Blade II, Jake in Spicy City, Polk in Vampire Hunter D: Bloodlust, additional voices in Spawn), (d. 2016).
- October 16: Suzanne Somers, American actress, author, singer, businesswoman and health spokesperson (voiced herself in The Simpsons episode "The Day the Violence Died"), (d. 2023).
- October 21: Lux Interior, American singer (voice of Bird Brains Lead Singer in SpongeBob SquarePants, Rayo X, Tarzan Eightball and Goth Boy in Los Campeones de la Lucha Libre), (d. 2009).
- October 22: Richard McGonagle, American actor (voice of Four Arms and Exo-Skull in Ben 10, General Grievous in Star Wars: Clone Wars, Dr. I.Q. Hi in Duck Dodgers, Abin Sur in Green Lantern: First Flight, Eight-Armed Willy in The Marvelous Misadventures of Flapjack, Reinrassig III in Ben 10: Alien Force, Brainiac in the Batman: The Brave and the Bold episode "Battle of the Superheroes!", Chameleon Sr. in the OK K.O.! Let's Be Heroes episode "My Dad Can Beat Up Your Dad").
- October 23: Bill Millar, English visual effect and animator (The Transformers: The Movie, G.I. Joe: The Movie), (d. 2026).
- October 27: Ivan Reitman, Slovak-born Canadian film and television director, screenwriter and producer (Heavy Metal, Beethoven, Space Jam, Mummies Alive!, Alienators: Evolution Continues), (d. 2022).

=== November ===
- November 1: Yuko Shimizu, Japanese designer (creator of Hello Kitty).
- November 2: Richard Newman, American-Canadian actor (voice of Mr. Turtle in Franklin, Rhinox in Beast Wars: Transformers and Beast Machines: Transformers, High Evolutionary and J. Jonah Jameson in Spider-Man Unlimited, Cranky Doodle Donkey in My Little Pony: Friendship Is Magic).
- November 3: Tom Savini, American prosthetic makeup artist, actor, stunt performer and film director (voiced himself in The Simpsons episode "Worst Episode Ever").
- November 6: Sally Field, American actress (voice of Marina del Ray in The Little Mermaid: Ariel's Beginning, Junie Harper in the King of the Hill episode "Hilloween").
- November 10: Jim Gilstrap, American singer and session musician (performed the theme song from TaleSpin), dies at age 79.
- November 20: Samuel E. Wright, American actor and singer (voice of Sebastian in The Little Mermaid franchise, Raw Toonage, Marsupilami, and House of Mouse, Kron in Dinosaur), (d. 2021).
- November 24: Joel Sill, American music supervisor (Animalympics, Space Chimps, The Adventures of Rocky and Bullwinkle), (d. 2025).
- November 25: Marc Brown, American author and illustrator (creator of Arthur).
- November 26: Lina Gagnon, Canadian animator (National Film Board of Canada), (d. 2022).
- November 28: Joe Dante, American actor, film editor, producer and director (Small Soldiers, Looney Tunes: Back in Action, Gremlins: Secrets of the Mogwai).

=== December ===
- December 1:
  - Jonathan Katz, American comedian and actor (voice of Dr. Katz in Dr. Katz, Professional Therapist, Erik Robbins in Home Movies).
  - Germana Dominici, Italian actress, (Italian dub voice of Georgette in Oliver & Company, Mrs. Beakley in DuckTales, and DuckTales the Movie: Treasure of the Lost Lamp, Eema in Dinosaur), (d. 2024).
- December 4: Sherry Alberoni, American actress (voice of Alexandra Cabot in Josie and the Pussycats, Wendy Harris in Super Friends, Laurie Partridge in Partridge Family 2200 A.D., Bo in Mighty Orbots).
- December 14: Lynne Marie Stewart, American actress (voice of Shirley Feeney in Mork & Mindy/Laverne & Shirley/Fonz Hour, Jessica Morganberry and young Clark Kent in Superman, Aunt Harriet in Batman: Return of the Caped Crusaders and Batman vs. Two-Face, Kitty Grunewald in Life with Louie, Clara, Izzie's Mother, and Beatrice in Izzie's Way Home, Sister Agnes and Barb Kleffman in Mike Tyson Mysteries, Mona Lisa in The Tick episode "Leonardo da Vinci and His Fightin' Genius Time Commandos!", Violet in the Batman: The Animated Series episode "Eternal Youth", additional voices in Barnyard, Family Dog, and A Pup Named Scooby-Doo), (d. 2025).
- December 15: Indira Stefanianna, American actress and singer (voice of Princess Dawn in Here Comes the Grump, Daphne Blake in season 1 of Scooby-Doo, Where Are You!).
- December 16: Charles Dennis, Canadian actor (voice of Rico in Home on the Range).
- December 17:
  - Eugene Levy, Canadian actor and comedian (voice of Captain Sternn and Edsel in Heavy Metal, Craig Ehrlich in Duckman, Joe Larsen in Committed, Clovis in Curious George, Lou in Over the Hedge, Orrin in Astro Boy, Charlie in Finding Dory, Midas in the Hercules episode "Hercules and the Golden Touch", Plug Guard in the Dilbert episode "The Return", additional voices in the Camp Candy episode "When It Rains... It Snows").
  - Jayne Eastwood, Canadian actress (voice of Birthday Bear and Bedtime Bear in the Care Bears franchise).
- December 18: Steven Spielberg, American film director (The Adventures of Tintin), screenwriter and producer (Warner Bros. Animation, An American Tail, Who Framed Roger Rabbit, The Land Before Time, A Wish for Wings That Work, Fievel's American Tails, Casper, Monster House, The Adventures of Tintin, Jurassic World Camp Cretaceous, founder of Amblimation, co-founder of Amblin Entertainment and DreamWorks Animation, voice of White Rabbit and himself in the Tiny Toon Adventures episodes "New Character Day" and "Buster and Babs Go Hawaiian").
- December 24:
  - Daniel Beretta, French actor (French dub voice of Mr. Swackhammer in Space Jam, Lumiere in Beauty and the Beast, Batou in the Ghost in the Shell franchise, President Arnold Schwarzenegger in The Simpsons Movie, Winston Zeddemore in The Real Ghostbusters, Mr. T in Johnny Bravo, King K. Rool and Krusha in Donkey Kong Country, Hugo in The Legend of Tarzan, Professor Cooper in Bubble Guppies, Foghorn Leghorn in The Looney Tunes Show), (d. 2024).
  - Arlene Banas, American actress (voice of Carly Witwicky in The Transformers).

=== Specific date unknown ===
- Bob Dermer, Canadian actor (voice of Grumpy Bear in Care Bears, Ralph Raccoon in The Raccoons).
- Eric Peterson, Canadian actor (voice of Noble Heart Horse in The Care Bears Family, Teebo in Ewoks).

== Deaths ==
=== January ===
- January 2: O'Galop, French painter, illustrator, graphic designer, animator, and comics artist, dies at age 78.

=== November ===
- November 9: Scotty Mattraw, American actor (voice of Bashful in Snow White and the Seven Dwarfs), dies at age 66.
- November 24: Charles Bowers, American comedian, animator and cartoonist (Raoul Barré, Walter Lantz), dies at age 59.

== See also ==
- List of anime by release date (1946–1959)
