= Ken Mora =

American film producer

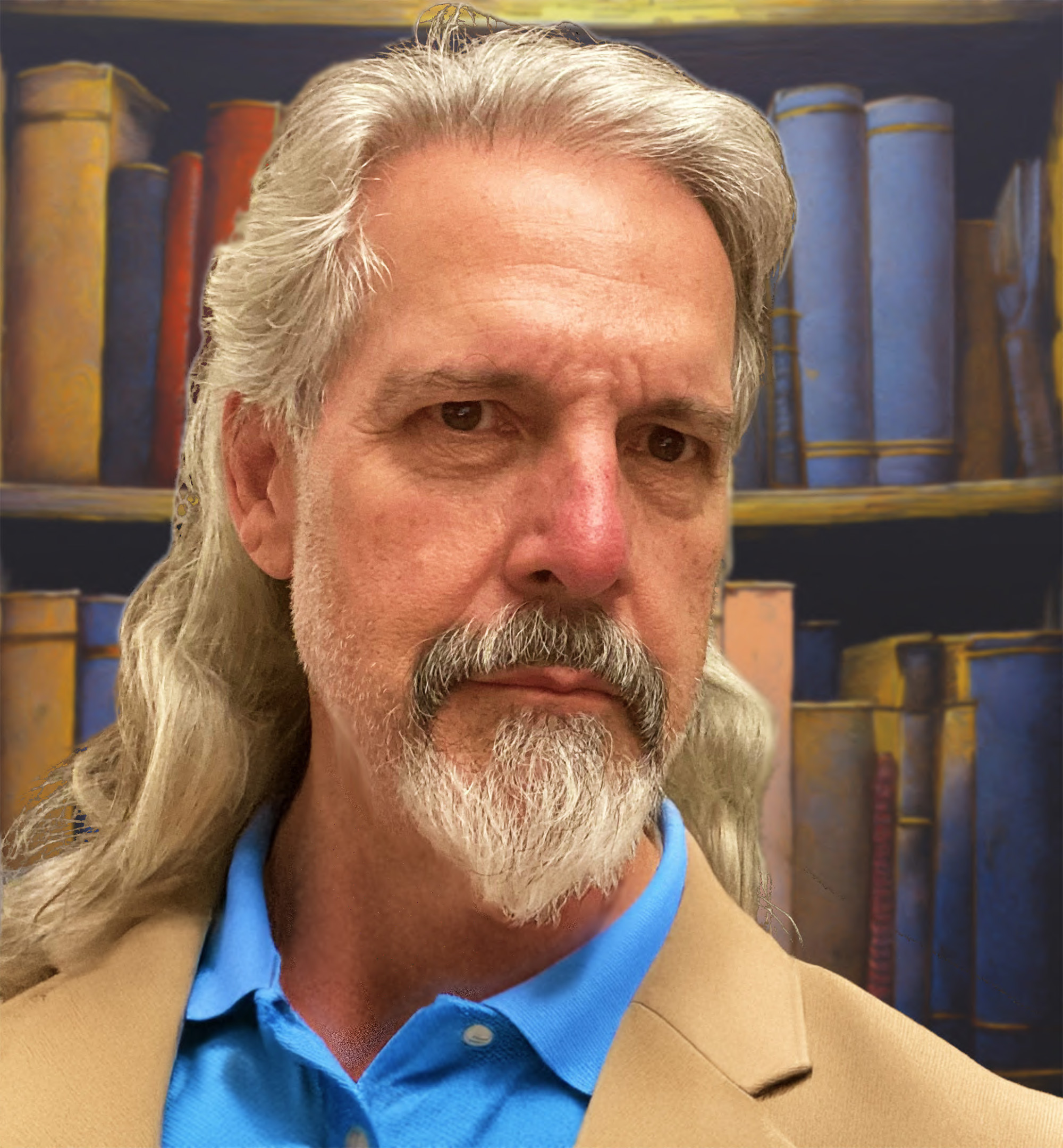
- Ken Mora: Author, Filmmaker. Photo by Ken Mora Creates.
- Born: December 17, 1960 (age 65)
- Education: University of Southern California (ROSKI School of Fine Arts), Los Angeles
- Known for: Animator, Publisher, Screenwriter, Film Director, Film Producer
- Notable work: Caravaggio: A Light Before The Darkness (Graphic Novel); Caged Birds #1 (serialized comic book); Revengeance (Feature Film, Animation); Adventures in Plymptoons (Feature Film, Documentary); Your Face Global Jam (Short, animation); Magnum Farce: A Shot in the Park (Short, animation)
- Awards: Caravaggio: A Light Before The Darkness, Best eComic 2022 * Your Face Global Jam, Best Micro-Animation, Indie Gathering 2018 * Your Face Global Jam, Best Short Animation, Benicia Film Festival 2018
- Website: http://www.kenmora.com/

Kenneth Oscar Mora (born December 17, 1960) is an American graphic novel publisher, screenplay writer, director, producer, and voice actor. In film, he is best known for creating the animated shorts entitled Magnum Farce: (2009, 2011) and the mixed-media Your Face Global Jam (2017). In publishing, Mora is creator/producer of the serialized Comic Book and subsequent Graphic Novel biography of Caravaggio Caravaggio: A Light Before The Darkness (2015,2019). Mora is also executive producer of Adventures in Plymptoons (2012) the official biographical documentary of animator Bill Plympton, and associate producer of Revengeance (2017) the feature animated film by Plympton and Jim Lujan.

== Early life ==
Mora was born in Hollywood, the youngest of two siblings. His father, Oscar Mora, is a native of Costa Rica, Central America. His mother, Betty Paulina Wood y Meza, was also a native of Costa Rica, and emigrated to the United States in 1957. His parents met in Los Angeles. The couple were married in April 1959 and were divorced in September 1961.

An avid comic book fan since childhood, when his father bought him How To Draw Comics The Marvel Way, Mora began his relationship with art and storytelling.

== Education and early career ==
After graduating from North High School (Torrance) in 1979, Mora studied variously at El Camino College, worked a variety of jobs, often two at once, and later continued his studies at DeVry University, Santa Monica College, and various private non-accredited learning institutions.

In 1984, with the release of the Apple Macintosh personal computer, Mora began his parallel development of computer and artistic skills. After receiving a layoff from Hughes Spacecraft, in El Segundo, CA, he work freelance with his graphic designer with MacTemps (now Aquent) and was ultimately hired away to the post of Art Director at The Verity Group, a management consulting firm in Sherman Oaks, Los Angeles.

In 1995 Mora returned to Santa Monica College to major in Art and Art History, and under the advisement of artist/professor Ronn Davis, transfer to University of Southern California (USC Roski School of Fine Arts) in 1997. At USC he earned his BFA, graduating with distinction with the class of 1999, where he shared speaking honors at the commencement ceremony during the tenure of then dean, Ruth Weisberg.

== Career in entertainment industry ==
In 2003 Mora's first screenplay A Light Before The Darkness, based on the volatile Baroque-era artist Caravaggio won several screenwriting competition awards, gained him representation via the Jack Scagnetti literary and talent agency, and an option from Buzzmedia Network for the feature film to be directed by Heinrich Dams.

By the time rights to A Light Before The Darkness reverted to him, he had completed his second and third screenplays, Magnum Farce, and Ms. Valkyrie. After several near-misses with production of Magnum Farce, he established his own sole-proprietorship production company Bella Fe Films in 2008, to produce the short film adaptation Magnum Farce: A Shot in the Park which garnered top accolades at film festivals.

In 2010, Mora, who had been a long-time fan of Bill Plympton who has been cited variously as "The King" or "Dean" of Indie Animation, became executive producer of the documentary on Plympton, Adventures in Plymptoons, directed by Alexia Anastasio.

In 2013, Mora established the pay-per-download New media venture Screenplay Theater. The venture produces "Audiomovies" which dramatize previously optioned or award-winning Screenplays, that have not been produced as Movies. Like most audiobooks these "Audiomovies" employ SAG-AFTRA actors, but also feature Foley and musical scores.

In 2017, Your Face Global Jam, an international collaborative tribute to Bill Plympton's first Academy Award-nominated short, produced and directed by Mora was released on his Bella Fe Media channel on YouTube.

== Career in publishing ==
In 2015, Mora published the first issue of his serialized graphic novel A Light Before the Darkness, a biography of the artist Caravaggio on the cloud-based distribution platform comiXology with a limited first printing for patrons of his successful Kickstarter campaign. The concluding issue of the series was published in March 2018. In 2020 the premiere Trade paperback (comics) edition won the Screencraft Cinematic Book Award (Graphic Novel) for 2019. The publication was also a finalist in the Eric Hoffer Award 2020 and finalist in Billy Bob Buttons The Wishing Shelf Independent Book Awards, 2019. June 2020, Mora published the first internationally available print edition in association with U.K. publisher Markosia.

== Screenwriter ==
- Magnum Farce (IMDb) (2013 – in development)
- Magnum Farce: Along Came a Sniper (IMDb) (2011)
- Magnum Farce: A Shot in the Park (IMDb) (2009)
- The Cook and the Thief (IMDb) (in development)
- A Light Before The Darkness (optioned, not produced)

== Director ==
- Your Face Global Jam (2018)
- Magnum Farce: Along Came a Sniper (2011)
- Magnum Farce: A Shot in the Park (2009)

== Producer ==
- Magnum Farce (IMDb) (2013 – in production)
- Magnum Farce: Along Came a Sniper (2011, short)
- Adventures in Plymptoons! (2011, documentary)
- Magnum Farce: A Shot in the Park (2009, short)

== Actor ==
- Slide - as J. Lyle Pendergrass (2024, feature film)
- Revengeance - as Cujo (2017, feature film)
- Magnum Farce: A Shot in the Park - as Sammie (2009, short)

== Consultant / crew / other ==
- Revengeance - Associate Producer, Sound Recordist, Voice Actor (2017, feature film)
- Wong Flew Over the Cukoo's Nest - Production Assistant (2010, drama)
- Townies - Script Consultant (2009, short)
- A Mass of Wine - Special Thanks (2010, short, documentary)
- The Other Side of Paradise - Very Special Thanks (2009, feature film)
- board member, Burbank International Film Festival, 2011, 2012, 2015
