= Guard Dog (film) =

2004 animated film by Bill Plympton

- Directed by: Bill Plympton
- Written by: Bill Plympton
- Release date: 2004

Guard Dog is a 2004 5-minute animated dark comedy short film that was hand-drawn and produced by independent animator Bill Plympton at his Plymptoons Studio. In 2005, the film was nominated for Best Animated Short Film at the 77th Academy Awards held in 2005 and produced by the Academy of Motion Picture Arts and Sciences. Also, in 2005, Guard Dog won Best Animated Short at Toronto World of Comedy International Film Festival, and won a Special Jury Mention for Animated Stories at Córdoba International Animation Festival – ANIMA. This film marked the second Oscar nomination for Plympton, his first being the animated short Your Face at the 60th Academy Awards.

The film is a humorous and violently surreal answer to the question "Why do dogs bark at such innocent creatures as pigeons and squirrels?" and gives the audience a window into the paranoid mind of a loyal guard dog as it imagines depicted dangers from harmless flora and fauna on a walk through a neighborhood park. Each potential threat, from flower, butterfly, and grasshopper, to bird, squirrel, and rope-jumping girl, is treated to its own improbable and often bloody vignette.

The eponymous Guard Dog has gone on to be featured in three more Bill Plympton short films to date, and appears in cameo in his feature films Idiots and Angels (2009), Cheatin' (2013) and the Weird Al Yankovic music video TMZ (2011). The character Guard Dog is referred to by the artist himself, as Plymptoon's 'Mickey Mouse'.

In 2010, Plympton orchestrated the reprise of this short film called "Guard Dog Global Jam" (debuting in 2011) which featured 75 international artists and animators each of whom worked on re-interpreting a fraction of the film's multiple vignettes.

Guard Dog was preserved by the Academy Film Archive in 2015.
