= AAMC =

AAMC may refer to:

- Archives of African American Music and Culture
- Al Ain Men's College, one of 12 colleges that constitute the Higher Colleges of Technology, Emirate of Abu Dhabi
- American Alliance for Medical Cannabis, a pro-medical cannabis organization, US
- Anne Arundel Medical Center, regional health system, US
- Association of American Medical Colleges, a non-profit organization established in 1876, US
- Association of Art Museum Curators
- Australian Army Medical Corps, established 1903, and granted "Royal" prefix in 1948
