= 42nd Annie Awards =

US animation awards ceremony held in 2015

- Date: January 31, 2015
- Site: Royce Hall; Los Angeles, California, U.S.
- Hosted by: Grey DeLisle
- Organized by: ASIFA-Hollywood

Highlights
- Best Animated Feature: How to Train Your Dragon 2
- Best Direction: Dean DeBlois; How to Train Your Dragon 2
- Most awards: How to Train Your Dragon 2 (6)
- Most nominations: The Boxtrolls (13)

The 42nd Annual Annie Awards honoring excellence in the field of animation of 2014 was held on January 31, 2015, at the University of California, Los Angeles's Royce Hall in Los Angeles, California, presenting in 36 categories. This year, a new category called Best Character Animation in a Video Game was added.

== Production nominees ==
On December 1, 2014, the nominations for Annie Awards were announced. The Boxtrolls earned the most nominations with 13 nominations, followed by How to Train Your Dragon 2 with 10 nominations. Big Hero 6 and Song of the Sea received 7 nominations each.

Best Animated Feature	Best Animated Special Production
How to Train Your Dragon 2 – DreamWorks Animation SKG: Big Hero 6 – Walt Disney Animation Studios; Cheatin' – Plymptoons Studio; Song of the Sea – GKIDS / Cartoon Saloon; The Book of Life – Reel FX Animation Studios / Twentieth Century Fox; The Boxtrolls – Focus Features / Laika; The Lego Movie – Warner Bros. Pictures; The Tale of the Princess Kaguya – GKIDS / Studio Ghibli	Cosmos: A Spacetime Odyssey – Voyager Pictures LLC: Dawn of the Dragon Racers – DreamWorks Animation; How Murray Saved Christmas – Universal Television; Polariffic – Bent Image Lab / Pershing Road Productions; Toy Story That Time Forgot – Pixar
Best Animated Short Subject	Best Animated TV/Broadcast Commercial
Feast – Walt Disney Animation Studios: Coda – And Maps And Plans Ltd.; Duet – Glen Keane Productions / Google ATAP; The Simpsons – “Michal Socha Couch Gag” – Gracie Films in Association with 20th Century Fox Television; Me and My Moulton – Mikrofilm AS / National Film Board of Canada; Silent – Moonbot Studios; The Dam Keeper – Tonko House LLC; The Raven – Moonbot Studios	Flight of the Stories – Aardman Animations: Citizen M: "Swan Song" – PES Film / Stoopid Buddy Studios / RESET; LEGO Batman 3: Beyond Gotham – Plastic Wax Studios
Best General Audience Animated TV/Broadcast Production For Preschool Children	Best Animated TV/Broadcast Production For Children's Audience
Tumble Leaf – Amazon Studios / Bix Pix Entertainment: Doc McStuffins – Brown Bag Films / Disney Junior; Peter Rabbit – Brown Bag Films / Silvergate Media; Wallykazam! – Nickelodeon Productions; Zack & Quack – The Foundation / QQD Ltd / High1 Entertainment	Gravity Falls – Disney Television Animation: Adventure Time – Cartoon Network Studios; The Legend of Korra – Nickelodeon Animation Studio; Over the Garden Wall – Cartoon Network Studios; Wander Over Yonder – Disney Television Animation
Best General Audience Animated TV/Broadcast Production	Best Animated Video Game
The Simpsons – Gracie Films in association with 20th Century Fox Television: Archer – FX Productions; Back to Backspace – Cartoon Network Studios; Bob's Burgers – Twentieth Century Fox Studios; Rick and Morty – Starburns Industries, Inc.; Mike Tyson Mysteries – Warner Bros. Animation; Regular Show – Cartoon Network Studios	Valiant Hearts: The Great War – Ubisoft Montpellier: Forza Horizon 2 – Microsoft Studios / Turn 10 / Playground Games; Child of Light – Ubisoft Montreal
Best Student Film
My Big Brother – Jason Rayner: After School – Junyi Xiao; Dead Over Heels – Jose Matheu; El Coyote – Javier Barboza; Frog's Legs – Katie Tamboer; Tiny Nomad – Toniko Pantoja

== Individual achievement categories ==
Outstanding Achievement, Animated Effects in an Animated Production	Outstanding Achievement, Animated Effects in a Live Action Production
Michael Kaschalk, Peter DeMund, David Hutchins, Henrik Falt, John Kosnik – Big Hero 6 – Walt Disney Animation Studios: James Jackson, Lucas Janin, Tobin Jones, Baptiste Van Opstal, Jason Mayer – How to Train Your Dragon 2 – DreamWorks Animation SKG; Fangwei Lee, Krzysztof Rost, Jihyun Yoon, Robert Chen – Mr. Peabody & Sherman – DreamWorks Animation; Mitul Patel, Nicolas Delbecq, Santosh Khedkar, Yash Argawal – Penguins of Madagascar – DreamWorks Animation; Augusto Schillaci, Erich Turner, Bill Konersman, Chris Rasch, Joseph Burnette – The Book of Life – Reel FX Animation Studios/Twentieth Century Fox; Rick Sevy, Peter Vickery, Kent Estep, Peter Stuart, Ralph Procida – The Boxtrolls – Focus Features/Laika; Jayandera Danappal, Matt Ebb, Christian Epunan Hernandez, Danielle Brooks, Raphael Gadot – The Lego Movie – Warner Bros. Pictures	Steve Avoujageli, Atsushi Ikarashi, Pawel Grochola, Paul Waggoner, Viktor Lundqvist – Edge of Tomorrow – Warner Bros./Village Roadshow Pictures: Raul Essig, Karin Cooper, Rick Hankins, Owen Calouro – Noah – Paramount Pictures; Charles-Felix Chabert, Daniel La Chapelle, Spencer Lueders, Klaus Seitschek, Chris Messineo – The Amazing Spider-Man 2 – Columbia Pictures/Marvel Enterprises; Areito Echevarria, Andreas Soderstrom, Ronnie Menahem, Christoph Sprenger, Kevin Romond – The Hobbit: The Desolation of Smaug – Metro Goldwyn Mayer/New Line Cinema/WingNut Films; Michael Balog, Jim Van Allen, Rick Hankins, John Hansen – Transformers: Age of Extinction – Paramount Pictures; Jeremy Hampton, Daniel Stern, Edmond Smith III, Hiroshi Tsubokawa, Daniel Jenkins – X-Men: Days of Future Past – Digital Domain 3.0, Inc.
Outstanding Achievement, Character Animation in an Animated Television/Broadcast Production	Outstanding Achievement, Character Animation in a Feature Production
Justin Nichols – Wander Over Yonder – Disney Television Animation: Don Crum – Toy Story That Time Forgot – Pixar; Carlo Vogele – Toy Story That Time Forgot – Pixar; Ken Kim – Toy Story That Time Forgot – Pixar; Michael Granberry – Tumble Leaf – Amazon Studios/Bix Pix Entertainment; Teresa Drilling – Tumble Leaf – Amazon Studios/Bix Pix Entertainment	Fabio Lignini – How to Train Your Dragon 2 – DreamWorks Animation SKG: Steven "Shaggy" Hornby – How to Train Your Dragon 2 – DreamWorks Animation SKG; Thomas Grummt – How to Train Your Dragon 2 – DreamWorks Animation SKG; Ravi Kamble – Penguins of Madagascar – DreamWorks Animation SKG; Travis Knight – The Boxtrolls – Focus Features/Laika; Malcolm Lamont – The Boxtrolls – Focus Features/Laika; Jason Stalman – The Boxtrolls – Focus Features/Laika
Outstanding Achievement, Character Animation in a Live Action Production	Outstanding Achievement, Character Animation in a Video Game
Daniel Barrett, Paul Story, Eteuati Tema, Alessandro Bonora, Dejan Momcilovic – Dawn of the Planet of the Apes – Chernin Entertainment/Ingenious Media: Kevin Spruce, Dale Newton, Sidney Kombo, Chris Mullins, Brad Silby – Guardians of the Galaxy – Marvel Studios; Eric Reynolds, David Clayton, Andreja Vuckovic, Guillaume Francois, Gios Johnston – The Hobbit: The Desolation of Smaug – Metro Goldwyn Mayer/New Line Cinema/WingNut Films	Mike Mennillo – Assassin's Creed Unity – Ubisoft Montreal: Don't Starve: Console Edition – Klei Entertainment Inc.; Alex Drouin – Child of Light – Ubisoft Montreal
Outstanding Achievement, Character Design in an Animated TV/Broadcast Production	Outstanding Achievement, Character Design in an Animated Feature Production
Benjamin Balistreri – Wander Over Yonder – Disney Television Animation: Andy Suriano – Mickey Mouse – Disney Television Animation; Zac Gorman – Welcome to the Wayne – Nickelodeon in association with Switch Animation	Paul Sullivan, Sandra Equihua, Jorge R. Gutierrez – The Book of Life – Reel FX Creative Studios/20th Century Fox: Shiyoon Kim, Jin Kim – Big Hero 6 – Walt Disney Animation Studios; Timothy Lamb, Joe Moshier – Mr. Peabody & Sherman – DreamWorks Animation; Craig Kellman, Joe Moshier, Stevie Lewis, Todd Kurosawa – Penguins of Madagascar – DreamWorks Animation; Sang Jun Lee, Jason Sadler, José Manuel Fernandez Oli – Rio 2 – Blue Sky Studios/20th Century Fox Animation; Tomm Moore, Marie Thorhauge, Sandra Anderson, Rosa Ballester Cabo – Song of the Sea – GKIDS/Cartoon Saloon; Mike Smith – The Boxtrolls – Focus Features/Laika
Outstanding Achievement, Directing in an Animated TV/Broadcast Production	Outstanding Achievement, Directing in an Animated Feature Production
Aaron Springer – Mickey Mouse – Disney Television Animation: Yuasa Masaaki, Eunyoung Choi – Adventure Time – Cartoon Network Studios; Bryan Fordney – Archer – FX Productions; Jennifer Coyle & Bernard Derriman – Bob's Burgers – 20th Century Fox Television; Rob Renzetti – Gravity Falls – Disney Television Animation; Robert Alvarez, Ken Bruce, Larry Leichliter – Over the Garden Wall – Cartoon Network Studios; Matthew Nastuk – The Simpsons – Gracie Films in association with 20th Century Fox Television; David Thomas – Wander Over Yonder – Disney Television Animation	Dean DeBlois – How to Train Your Dragon 2 – DreamWorks Animation SKG: Don Hall & Chris Williams – Big Hero 6 – Walt Disney Animation Studios; Bill Plympton – Cheatin' – Plymptoons Studio; Tomm Moore – Song of the Sea – GKIDS/Cartoon Saloon; Jorge R. Gutierrez – The Book of Life – Reel FX Animation Studios/20th Century Fox; Anthony Stacchi & Graham Annable – The Boxtrolls – Focus Features/Laika; Phil Lord and Christopher Miller, Directors; Chris McKay, Co-director – The Lego Movie – Warner Bros. Pictures; Isao Takahata – The Tale of the Princess Kaguya – GKIDS/Studio Ghibli
Outstanding Achievement, Music in an Animated TV/Broadcast Production	Outstanding Achievement, Music in an Animated Feature Production
Christopher Willis – Mickey Mouse – Disney Television Animation: Peter Lurye, George Gabriel, Chris Gifford – Dora and Friends: Into the City! – Nickelodeon Productions; Jay Vincent, Michael Kramer, Jeppe Riddervold, Erin Chapman – Lego Ninjago: Masters of Spinjitzu – Wil Film ApS; Lolita Ritmanis, Kristopher Carter & Michael McCuistion – Avengers Assemble – Marvel Animation; Nathan Barr & Lisbeth Scott – Tumble Leaf – Amazon Studios/Bix Pix Entertainment	John Powell, Jónsi – How to Train Your Dragon 2 – DreamWorks Animation SKG: Nicole Renaud – Cheatin' – Plymptoons Studio; Danny Elfman – Mr. Peabody & Sherman – DreamWorks Animation; Bruno Coulais & Kíla – Song of the Sea – GKIDS/Cartoon Saloon; Joe Hisaishi – The Tale of the Princess Kaguya – GKIDS/Studio Ghibli
Outstanding Achievement, Production Design in an Animated TV/Broadcast Production	Outstanding Achievement, Production Design in an Animated Feature Production
Narina Sokolova – Mickey Shorts – Disney: Kara Vallow, Brent Woods, Lucas Gray & Andrew Brandou – Cosmos: A Spacetime Odyssey – Voyager Pictures LLC; Joseph Holt – Disney Mickey Mouse – Disney Television Animation; Kevin Dart, Chris Turnham, Jasmin Lai & Elle Michalka – The Powerpuff Girls – Cartoon Network; Antonio Canobbio, Khang Le, Mark Taihei, Howard Chen & Brandon Cuellar – Turbo FAST – DreamWorks Animation; Alex Kirwan, Chris Tsirigotis, Alexander Duckworth, Janice Kubo & Francis Giglio – Wander Over Yonder – Disney Television Animation; Erez Gavish – Zack & Quack – The Foundation / QQD Ltd / High1 Entertainment	Paul Lasaine, Tom McClure & August Hall – The Boxtrolls – Focus Features/Laika: David James, Ruben Perez, Priscilla Wong, Timothy Lamb & Alexandre Puvilland – Mr. Peabody & Sherman – DreamWorks Animation; Adrien Merigeau – Song of the Sea – GKIDS/Cartoon Saloon; Simon Varela & Paul Sullivan – The Book of Life – Reel FX Animation Studios/Twentieth Century Fox; Grant Freckelton – The Lego Movie – Warner Bros. Pictures
Outstanding Achievement, Storyboarding in an Animated TV/Broadcast Production	Outstanding Achievement, Storyboarding in an Animated Feature Production
Joaquim Dos Santos - The Legend of Korra - Nickelodeon: Heiko Drengenberg - Disney Mickey Mouse – Disney Television Animation; Luke Weber, Alonso Ramirez Ramos, Neil Graf & Steve Heneveld - Gravity Falls - Disney Television Animation; Nathaniel Villanueva & Douglas Lovelace - Star Wars Rebels - Lucasfilm, Ltd/Disney XD; Brad Ableson, Matthew Faughnan & Stephen Reis - The Simpsons - Gracie Films in association with 20th Century Fox Television; Louise Smythe - Toy Story That Time Forgot - Pixar; Mark Ackland - Wander Over Yonder - Disney Television Animation	Truong "Tron" Son Mai - How to Train Your Dragon 2 - DreamWorks Animation SKG: Marc E. Smith – Big Hero 6 – Walt Disney Animation Studios; Piero Piluso - Planes: Fire & Rescue - Disneytoon Studios; John Hurst - Rio 2 - Blue Sky Studios/20th Century Fox Animation; Rodrigo Perez-Castro - Rio 2 - Blue Sky Studios/20th Century Fox Animation; Julian Nariño – The Boxtrolls – Focus Features/Laika; Emanuela Cozzi – The Boxtrolls – Focus Features/Laika
Outstanding Achievement, Voice Acting in an Animated TV/Broadcast Production	Outstanding Achievement, Voice Acting in an Animated Feature Production
Bill Farmer as the voices of Goofy and Grandma - Disney Mickey Mouse – Disney Television Animation: Carlos Alazraqui as the voice of Crocker - The Fairly OddParents - Nickelodeon; Seth Green as the voice of Robot Chicken Nerd - Robot Chicken - A Stoopid Buddy Stoodios Production in association with Stoopid Monkey and Williams Street	Sir Ben Kingsley as the voice of Archibald Snatcher - The Boxtrolls – Focus Features/Laika: Cyndi Lauper as the voice of Nurse Cyndi - Henry & Me - Henry & Me Productions LLC; Andy Garcia as the voice of Eduardo - Rio 2 - Blue Sky Studios/20th Century Fox Animation; Dee Bradley Baker as the voice of Fish - The Boxtrolls – Focus Features/Laika
Outstanding Achievement, Writing in an Animated TV/Broadcast Production	Outstanding Achievement, Writing in an Animated Feature Production
Darrick Bachman - Disney Mickey Mouse – Disney Television Animation: Dave Tennant, David P. Smith, Chris Mitchell & Will Mata - The Powerpuff Girls - Cartoon Network Studios; Rob LaZebnik - The Simpsons - Gracie Films in association with 20th Century Fox Television; Tim Long - The Simpsons - Gracie Films in association with 20th Century Fox Television; Steve Purcell - Toy Story That Time Forgot - Pixar	Phil Lord & Christopher Miller – The Lego Movie – Warner Bros. Pictures: Robert L. Baird, Daniel Gerson & Jordan Roberts – Big Hero 6 – Walt Disney Animation Studios; Dean DeBlois - How to Train Your Dragon 2 - DreamWorks Animation SKG; Will Collins – Song of the Sea – GKIDS/Cartoon Saloon; Irena Brignull & Adam Pava - The Boxtrolls – Focus Features/Laika
Outstanding Achievement, Editorial in an Animated TV/Broadcast Production	Outstanding Achievement, Editorial in an Animated Feature Production
Illya Owens - Disney Mickey Mouse – Disney Television Animation: Ernesto Matamoros - Dragons: Defenders of Berk - DreamWorks Animation; Mike Elias - Family Guy - 20th Century Fox Television; David Suther, Bradley Furnish & David Condolora - Toy Story That Time Forgot - Pixar; Todd Raleigh & Doug Vito - Turbo FAST - DreamWorks Animation	John K. Carr - How to Train Your Dragon 2 - DreamWorks Animation SKG: Tim Mertens – Big Hero 6 – Walt Disney Animation Studios; Dan Molina, Mark Keefer & Karen Hathawa - Planes: Fire & Rescue - Disneytoon Studios; Darragh Byrne – Song of the Sea – GKIDS/Cartoon Saloon; David Burrows, Todd Hansen, Doug Nicholas, Jonathan Tappin & Courtney O'Brien-Brown – The Lego Movie – Warner Bros. Pictures

== Juried awards ==
Winsor McCay Award
Didier Brunner, Don Lusk and Lee Mendelson
for their career contributions to the art of animation
June Foray Award
Charles Solomon
for his significant and benevolent or charitable impact on the art and industry of animation
Ub Iwerks Award
DreamWorks Animation's Apollo Software
for technical advancement that has made a significant impact on the art or industry of animation
Special Achievement Award
The Walt Disney Family Museum
recognizing the unique and significant impact on the art and industry of animation
Certificate of Merit
Lawrence Shapiro
for the film I Know That Voice, a documentary about American voice acting.

== Dates and deadlines ==
Dates	Events
September 3, 2014	Call for Entries
November 5, 2014	Deadline to receive Annie Award entries and materials (midnight)
November 5, 2014	Deadline to renew or join ASIFA-Hollywood to be able to participate in Annie Award voting
November 5, 2014	Deadline to become an Annies Sponsor
December 1, 2014	Annie Award Nominations announced
December 8, 2014	Deadline to reserve an ad in the Program Book
December 8, 2014	Materials for Annie Awards ballot and ceremony due
January 2, 2015	Online Balloting Begins
January 9, 2015	Deadline to receive Sponsor advertising artwork
January 19, 2015	Deadline to cast Annie ballots
January 31, 2015	42nd Annie Awards at UCLA's Royce Hall
