= 38th Annie Awards =

US media awards ceremony held in 2011

- Date: February 5, 2011
- Site: Royce Hall; Los Angeles, California, U.S.
- Hosted by: Tom Kenny
- Organized by: ASIFA-Hollywood

Highlights
- Best Animated Feature: How to Train Your Dragon
- Best Direction: Chris Sanders and Dean DeBlois; How to Train Your Dragon
- Most awards: How to Train Your Dragon (10)
- Most nominations: How to Train Your Dragon (15)

The 38th Annual Annie Awards honoring the best in animation of 2010 was held February 5, 2011, at Royce Hall in Los Angeles, California. DreamWorks Animation's How to Train Your Dragon was the big winner winning 10 out of its 15 nominations, sparking a big controversy over Disney and Pixar's boycott.

== Production nominees ==
Nominations announced on December 6, 2010.

=== Best Animated Feature ===
How to Train Your Dragon – DreamWorks Animation

- Despicable Me – Illumination Entertainment
- Tangled – Walt Disney Pictures
- The Illusionist – Django Films
- Toy Story 3 – Disney/Pixar

=== Best Animated Short Subject ===
Day & Night – Disney/Pixar

- Coyote Falls - Warner Bros. Animation
- Enrique Wrecks the World - House of Chai
- The Cow Who Wanted To Be A Hamburger - Plymptoons Studio
- The Renter - Jason Carpenter

=== Best Animated Television Commercial ===
Children's Medical Center - DUCK Studios

- Frito Lay Dips "And Then There Was Salsa" - LAIKA/house
- ‘How To Train Your Dragon’ Winter Olympic Interstitial "Speed Skating" - DreamWorks Animation
- McDonald's "Spaceman Stu" - DUCK Studios & Kompost
- Pop Secret "When Harry Met Sally" - Nathan Love

=== Best Animated Television Production ===
- Futurama - The Curiosity Company in association with 20th Century Fox Television
- Scared Shrekless - DreamWorks Animation
- Kung Fu Panda Holiday - DreamWorks Animation
- Star Wars: The Clone Wars “Arc Troopers” - Lucasfilm Animation, Ltd.
- The Simpsons - Gracie Films

=== Best Animated Television Production for Children ===
SpongeBob SquarePants – Nickelodeon

- Adventure Time - Cartoon Network Studios
- Cloudbread – GIMC
- Fanboy & Chum Chum - Nickelodeon, Frederator
- Regular Show - Cartoon Network Studios

=== Best Animated Video Game ===
Limbo – Playdead

- Heavy Rain - Quantic Dream
- Kirby's Epic Yarn - Good-Feel & HAL Laboratory
- Shank - Klei Entertainment Inc.

== Individual Achievement Categories ==
=== Animated Effects in an Animated Production ===
Brett Miller - How To Train Your Dragon - DreamWorks Animation

- Andrew Young Kim - Shrek Forever After - DreamWorks Animation
- Jason Mayer - How To Train Your Dragon - DreamWorks Animation
- Sebastian Quessy - Legend of the Guardians: The Owls of Ga'Hoole - Warner Bros. Pictures
- Kryzstof Rost - Megamind - DreamWorks Animation

=== Character Animation in a Television Production ===
David Pate - Kung Fu Panda Holiday - DreamWorks Animation

- Nicolas A. Chauvelot - "Scared Shrekless" - DreamWorks Animation
- Savelon Forrest - Robot Chicken: Star Wars Episode III - ShadowMachine
- Elizabeth Havetine - Robot Chicken: Star Wars Episode III – ShadowMachine
- Nideep Varghese - Scared Shrekless - DreamWorks Animation

=== Character Animation in a Feature Production ===
Gabe Hordos - How To Train Your Dragon - DreamWorks Animation

- Mark Donald - Megamind - DreamWorks Animation
- Anthony Hodgson - Megamind - DreamWorks Animation
- Jakob Hjort Jensen - How To Train Your Dragon - DreamWorks Animation
- David Torres - How To Train Your Dragon - DreamWorks Animation

=== Character Animation in a Live Action Production ===
Ryan Page - Alice in Wonderland

- Quentin Miles - Clash of the Titans

=== Character Design in a Television Production ===
Ernie Gilbert - T.U.F.F. Puppy – Nickelodeon

- Andy Bialk - The Ricky Gervais Show - W!LDBRAIN Entertainment
- Stephan DeStefano - Sym-Bionic Titan - Cartoon Network
- Gordon Hammond - T.U.F.F. Puppy – Nickelodeon
- Steve Lam - Fanboy & Chum Chum - Nickelodeon, Frederator

=== Character Design in a Feature Production ===
Nico Marlet - How To Train Your Dragon - DreamWorks Animation

- Sylvain Chomet - The Illusionist - Django Films
- Carter Goodrich - Despicable Me - Illumination Entertainment
- Timothy Lamb - Megamind - DreamWorks Animation

=== Directing in a Television Production ===
Tim Johnson - Kung Fu Panda Holiday - DreamWorks Animation

- Bob Anderson - The Simpsons - Gracie Films
- Peter Chung - Firebreather - Cartoon Network Studios
- Duke Johnson - Frankenhole: Humanitas – ShadowMachine
- Gary Trousdale - Scared Shrekless - DreamWorks Animation

=== Directing in a Feature Production ===
Chris Sanders, Dean DeBlois - How To Train Your Dragon - DreamWorks Animation

- Sylvain Chomet - The Illusionist - Django Films
- Pierre Coffin - Despicable Me – Illumination Entertainment
- Mamoru Hosoda - Summer Wars – Madhouse/Funimation
- Lee Unkrich - Toy Story 3 – Pixar

=== Music in a Television Production ===
Jeremy Wakefield, Sage Guyton, Nick Carr and Tuck Tucker - SpongeBob SquarePants – Nickelodeon

- J. Walter Hawkes - Wonder Pets! - Nickelodeon Production & Little Airplane Productions
- Henry Jackman, Hans Zimmer and John Powell - Kung Fu Panda Holiday - DreamWorks Animation
- Tim Long, Alf Clausen, Bret McKenzie, Jemaine Clement - The Simpsons: Elementary School Musical - Gracie Films
- Shawn Patterson - Robot Chicken's DP Christmas Special – ShadowMachine

=== Music in a Feature Production ===
John Powell - How To Train Your Dragon - DreamWorks Animation

- Sylvain Chomet - The Illusionist - Django Films
- David Hirschfelder - Legend of the Guardians: The Owls of Ga'Hoole - Warner Bros. Pictures
- Harry Gregson Williams - Shrek Forever After - DreamWorks Animation
- Pharrell Williams, Heitor Pereira - Despicable Me - Illumination Entertainment

=== Production Design in a Television Production ===
Richie Sacilioc - Kung Fu Panda Holiday - DreamWorks Animation

- Alan Bodner - Neighbors from Hell - 20th Century Fox Television
- Barry Jackson - Firebreather - Cartoon Network Studios
- Pete Oswald - Doubtsourcing - Badmash Animation Studios
- Scott Wills - Sym-Bionic Titan - Cartoon Network Studios

=== Production Design in a Feature Production ===
Pierre Olivier Vincent - How To Train Your Dragon - DreamWorks Animation

- Yarrow Cheney - Despicable Me - Illumination Entertainment
- Eric Guillon - Despicable Me - Illumination Entertainment
- Dan Hee Ryu - Legend of the Guardians: The Owls of Ga'Hoole - Warner Bros. Pictures
- Peter Zaslav - Shrek Forever After - DreamWorks Animation

=== Storyboarding in a Television Production ===
Fred Gonzales - T.U.F.F. Puppy – Nickelodeon

- Sean Bishop - Scared Shrekless - DreamWorks Animation
- Tom Owens - Kung Fu Panda Holiday - DreamWorks Animation
- Dave Thomas - Fairly OddParents – Nickelodeon

=== Storyboarding in a Feature Production ===
Tom Owens - How To Train Your Dragon - DreamWorks Animation

- Alessandro Carloni - How To Train Your Dragon - DreamWorks Animation
- Paul Fisher - Shrek Forever After - DreamWorks Animation
- Catherine Yuh Rader - Megamind - DreamWorks Animation

=== Voice Acting in a Feature Production ===
Jay Baruchel as Hiccup - How To Train Your Dragon - DreamWorks Animation

- Gerard Butler as Stoick - How To Train Your Dragon - DreamWorks Animation
- Steve Carell as Gru - Despicable Me - Illumination Entertainment
- Cameron Diaz as Fiona - Shrek Forever After - DreamWorks Animation
- Geoffrey Rush as Ezylryb - Legend of the Guardians: The Owls of Ga'Hoole - Warner Bros. Pictures

=== Voice Acting in a Television Production ===
James Hong as Mr. Ping - Kung Fu Panda Holiday - DreamWorks Animation

- Jeff Bennett as The Necronomicon - Fanboy & Chum Chum - Nickelodeon & Frederator
- Corey Burton as Baron Papanoida - Star Wars: The Clone Wars - Cartoon Network
- Nika Futterman as Asajj Ventress - Star Wars: The Clone Wars - Cartoon Network
- Mike Henry as Cleveland Brown - The Cleveland Show - Fox Television Animation

=== Writing in a Television Production ===
Geoff Johns, Matthew Beans, Zeb Wells, Hugh Sterbakov, Matthew Senreich, Breckin Meyer, Seth Green, Mike Fasolo, Douglas Goldstein, Tom Root, Dan Milano, Kevin Shinick & Hugh Davidson - "Robot Chicken: Star Wars Episode III" – ShadowMachine

- Daniel Arkin - "Star Wars: The Clone Wars: Heroes on Both Sides" - Lucasfilm Animation Ltd.
- Jon Colton Barry & Piero Piluso - "Phineas & Ferb: Nerds of a Feather" - Disney Channel
- Billy Kimball & Ian Maxtone-Graham - "The Simpsons: Stealing First Base" - Gracie Films
- Michael Rowe - "Futurama" - The Curiosity Company in association with 20th Century Fox Television

=== Writing in a Feature Production ===
William Davies, Dean DeBlois, Chris Sanders - How to Train Your Dragon – DreamWorks Animation

- Michael Arndt - Toy Story 3 – Pixar
- Sylvain Chomet - The Illusionist – Django Films
- Dan Fogelman - Tangled - Disney
- Alan J. Schoolcraft, Brent Simons - Megamind – DreamWorks Animation
