= Mutant Aliens =

2001 film by Bill Plympton

- Directed by: Bill Plympton
- Written by: Bill Plympton
- Produced by: Bill Plympton
- Starring: Dan McComas; Francine Lobis; George Casden; Matthew Brown; Jay Cavanaugh; Amy Allison; Christopher Schukai; Kevin Kolack; Vera Beren; Bill Plympton
- Cinematography: John Donnelly
- Edited by: Anthony Arcidi
- Music by: Hank Bones; Maureen McElheron
- Production company: Plymptoons
- Distributed by: Apollo Cinema
- Release date: January 24, 2001 (Sundance Film Festival)
- Running time: 81 minutes
- Country: United States
- Language: English

Mutant Aliens is a 2001 American adult animated science fiction comedy film written and directed by Bill Plympton.

== Synopsis ==
After leaving his 5-years old daughter Josie, astronaut of the USA government Earl Jensen is stranded in space intentionally by the head of the Department of Space. Years later, he returns to Earth. To gain the people's trust, he tells the story of the time he has spent on a planet inhabited by humanoid aliens with animal body parts. Jensen later tells he has an interest in crossbreeding the aliens to create an army of mutants, in order to exact his revenge on the Department of Space head.

== Production ==
The film was fully made at Plympton´s studio in New York City Plymptoons and is a spoof of B monster movies, featuring Plympton's own distinctive animation style consisting in hand-drawn animation made using colored pencils with backgrounds painted in brushes and gratuitous sex and violence.
