= Revengeance (film) =

- Directed by: Bill Plympton; Jim Lujan
- Screenplay by: Bill Plympton; Jim Lujan
- Produced by: Bill Plympton; Wendy Cong Zhao; Marco Milone; Georges Schoucair
- Starring: Dave Foley; Matthew Modine; Jim Lujan; Ruby Modine; Sara Ulloa; Keith Knight; Ken Mora
- Edited by: Sam Welch
- Music by: Jim Lujan
- Production company: Schortcut Films
- Distributed by: E.D. Distribution; The Criterion Channel
- Release dates: September 15, 2016 (L'Étrange Festival, Paris, France)
- Running time: 76 minutes
- Country: United States
- Language: English

Revengeance is a 2016 American independent adult animated buddy cop crime biker action black comedy film directed by Bill Plympton and Jim Lujan. The film, which has a writing style similar to exploitation flicks and Quentin Tarantino films, tells the story of a low-rent bounty hunter named Rod Rosse, "The One-Man Posse," who becomes entangled in a web of danger when he takes on a job from an ex-biker/ex-wrestler turned U.S. Senator named "Deathface." Lujan wrote, composed, and voiced several characters in the film, while Plympton single-handedly animated the entire feature by pencil on paper. The character of Rod Rosse originated in Lujan's 2011 independent animated short, Rod Rosse The One Man Posse.

== Plot ==
In the sun-bleached Inland Empire, Rod Rosse (Jim Lujan), a diminutive bounty hunter known as the "One-Man Posse," lives with his tech-savvy, cat-loving Mom (Jim Lujan). After apprehending criminal Luis Escobar, Rod is hired by Deathface (Jim Lujan), an ex-biker and ex-pro-wrestler turned corrupt U.S. Senator, to track down a teenage fugitive named Lana Oswald (Sara Ulloa).

Lana is suspected of committing an arson attack on the "Den"—the headquarters of the Inland Emperors biker gang—to steal a high-stakes VHS tape. The tape contains footage of Deathface and his strategist, Royce Vargas (Lalo Alcaraz), performing a choreographed dance in ridiculous costumes; the exposure of this footage would dismantle Deathface’s hyper-masculine "tough guy" political reputation. The hunt attracts several mercenaries, including the Blaxploitation-styled Odell Braxton and the devious truck-driving troll Ace of Spades (Dave Foley). When Ace refuses Rod’s offer to team up, Rod has him drugged with his signature "Nightie Night" drops and shipped to Mexico to eliminate the competition.

As Rod navigates a desert underbelly of strippers and cult members, the truth behind Lana’s mission emerges: she is the daughter of Kurt and Kristie Oswald, the original founders of the Inland Emperors. Years prior, Royce Vargas manipulated Deathface into murdering the Oswalds in a staged fire to seize control of the gang. Deathface’s history of treachery is extensive, including the betrayal of his former wrestling peer, Big Papa Booyah. Lana, raised in the desert by her Aunt (Ruby Modine)—the sister of Kristie Oswald—was trained in lethal archery to "fix what needs to be fixed." She is aided by Chaw, a local informant, and her stepbrother Eric, a DJ at the bar Cha Cha Boom who goes by the name E-Money.

The conflict culminates at "Face Cares," a vanity charity music festival. When Lana corners Deathface’s assistant, Ms. Candy, with an arrow, Deathface refuses to help her, prompting Ms. Candy to defect. Utilizing the festival’s media equipment, Rod’s Mother and investigative reporter Connie Sanchez broadcast the "dancing tape" to the crowd. In the ensuing chaos, Deathface is killed and Vargas is imprisoned. In the aftermath, a handful of bikers still loyal to Deathface quit the gang following the exposure, and Lana Oswald becomes the sole new leader of the Inland Emperors.

== Cast ==
The cast features a combination of longtime collaborators and high-profile guest stars in uncredited cameos.

- Jim Lujan as Rod Rosse / Deathface / Mom / Ms. Candy / The Master / Gary the Clerk / Connie Sanchez / Sandman / Luis Escobar / Big Papa Booyah (uncredited) / Chaw (uncredited) / Kurt Oswald (uncredited).
- Sara Ulloa as Lana Oswald.
- Lalo Alcaraz as Royce Vargas.
- John Holderried as Eric ("E-Money").
- Kaya Rogue as Odell Braxton.
- Keith Knight as Pawnshop Slim
- Ken Mora as Cujo
- Geo Brawn as The Shademan.
- Matthew Modine as Sid (uncredited).
- Dave Foley as Ace of Spades (uncredited).
- Kristina Wong as Kristie Oswald (uncredited).
- Ruby Modine as Lana's Aunt (uncredited).

== Release ==
Revengeance premiered at the L'Étrange Festival in Paris, France, in September 2016. It made its US premiere on February 18, 2017, at the 40th Portland International Film Festival.

It was later released on DVD and Blu-Ray.

== Release ==
Revengeance premiered at the L'Étrange Festival in Paris, France, in September 2016. It made its US premiere on February 18, 2017, at the 40th Portland International Film Festival.

It was later released on DVD and Blu-Ray.

== Production ==
The development of Revengeance began as a collaboration between Bill Plympton and Jim Lujan after Plympton became a fan of Lujan’s independent animated shorts. The film is noted for its traditional production method; Plympton hand-drew every frame of the feature in pencil on paper, a technique that provides the animation with a signature "vibrating" or "shimmering" line quality. These drawings were later digitally colored by Plympton's studio staff using a color palette designed by Lujan to reflect a gritty, 1970s "dirty noir" atmosphere.

Lujan wrote the screenplay and composed the film's soundtrack, which features a mix of 1970s funk, heavy biker rock, and ambient noir themes. The character of Rod Rosse and his specific tactical use of "Nightie Night" sedative drops were established in Lujan's 2011 original short film, Rod Rosse The One Man Posse.

The project was partially funded through a successful Kickstarter campaign in 2015, which helped support the coloring and post-production phases of the film.

== Soundtrack ==
The original score for Revengeance was composed and performed by Jim Lujan. The soundtrack is heavily influenced by 1970s exploitation film scores, featuring a mix of funk, heavy biker rock, and ambient noir themes.

Lujan utilized vintage synthesizer sounds and distorted guitar riffs to establish the "dirty noir" tone of the Inland Empire setting. Several tracks from the film were released as a companion CD within the "Mediabook" physical release of the movie.

== Awards ==
- 2017 Nashville Film Festival Animated Feature Competition Grand Jury Prize Winner
