= Hitler's Folly =

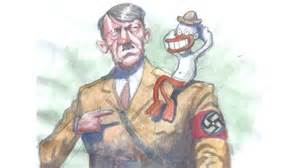
- Screenshot from the film
- Directed by: Bill Plympton
- Screenplay by: Bill Plympton
- Produced by: Bill Plympton
- Starring: Nate Steinwachs; Dana Ashbrook
- Production company: Plymptoons Studio
- Release date: June 3, 2016
- Running time: 67 minutes
- Country: United States
- Language: English

Hitler's Folly is a 2016 American mockumentary film directed, written, designed and animated by Bill Plympton.

== Plot ==
A satirical reimagining of the life and dreams of the Nazi dictator Adolf Hitler. The film explores Hitler's unfulfilled animation career, involving creating a Disneyland-like place called Nazi-land.

== Cast ==
- Nate Steinwachs as Adolf Hitler
- Dana Ashbrook as Josh
- Michael Sullivan as Michael S.
- Kristin Samuelson as Gerte, German dancer
- Andreas Hykade as concentration camp survivor
- Morton Hall Millen as Advertising Executive
- David Shakopi as Chief of Police
- Kevin Kolack as Head of Forensics
- Edie Bales as Eva Braun
- Alfred Rosenblatt as Bijou Kino Cinema Owner
- Ari Taub as Nazi SS Soldier
- James Hancock as Nazi SS Soldier
- Bill Plympton as Interviewer

== Production ==
According to Plympton's blog, three of his "studio staffers have quit because they were so offended by the project."
