= Idiots and Angels =

- Promotional Poster
- Directed by: Bill Plympton
- Screenplay by: Bill Plympton
- Produced by: Bill Plympton
- Starring: Mike Juarez; Carrie Keranen; Marc Diraison; Arielle Doneson; Greg Sextro; Michael Sinterniklass
- Music by: Greg Sextro
- Production company: Bill Plympton Studios
- Distributed by: E.D. Distribution
- Release date: 2008
- Running time: 78 minutes
- Country: United States
- Language: English

Idiots and Angels is a 2008 adult animated urban fantasy black comedy film directed by Bill Plympton.

== Plot ==
Angel is a selfish, abusive, morally bankrupt man who hangs out at a local bar, berating the other patrons. One day, Angel mysteriously wakes up with a pair of wings on his back. The wings make him do good deeds, contrary to his nature. He tries to rid himself of the wings, but eventually finds himself fighting for those who view his wings as their ticket to fame and fortune.

== Cast ==
- Mike Juarez as Angel: A selfish, broke, and arrogant man who changes his views after he starts to grow wings on his back.
- Carrie Keranen as Blonde: The sweet-natured blonde woman and wife of Bart. Also Angel's love interest and former enemy.
- Marc Diraison as Bart: The greedy local bar owner.
- Arielle Doneson as Fatty: The mean, harsh and also materialistic fat woman who hangs out in the bar hoping to gain fame, fortune and the attraction of men.
- Greg Sextro as Doctor Hartman
- Michael Sinterniklass as Mystery Guy: A bearded man who tried to rob the bar, but was later caught by the police. He was later revealed to be the crossword puzzle guy.

== Production ==
According to Bill Plympton, the concept for the film came from the top of his head when asked by an audience member what his next film would be about. Plympton said "It's about an asshole guy who wakes up one morning with wings on his back". Interested in the idea, Plympton built a whole story around it.

After the commercial disappointment of Plympton's last feature, Hair High, he decided to do something different, in style, writing, etc. Terry Gilliam allowed Plympton to use his name to promote the film, and it was titled Terry Gilliam Presents Idiots And Angels: A Bill Plympton Production on promotional posters.

The film has no dialogue, as Plympton became more interested in telling a story through straight visuals.
