= American Alliance for Medical Cannabis =

US health organization

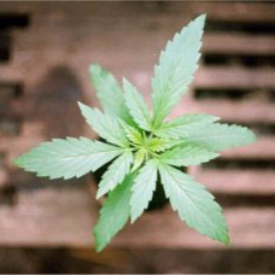
- Triple leaf cannabis plant
- Formation: May 1, 2001
- Purpose: Promote the legal access to medical marijuana
- Website: letfreedomgrow.org

The American Alliance for Medical Cannabis (AAMC) is an organization that promotes the legal access to medical cannabis, with the help of health professionals, members of the community, educators, patients, clergy and caregivers. The National Director from 2001 to 2005 was Dr. Jay Cavanaugh. The current National Director is Arthur H Livermore Jr.

== Membership ==
Included in AAMC membership are experts in the field of cannabis medicine including clinical applications, organic farming, patient advocacy, history, medical preparations, patient rights, and support, some additional aspects of the AAMC Mission include clinical research and educating the decision makers about the issue.

== Mission ==
The Primary Mission of AAMC is to give patients, caregivers and volunteers all the facts they will need to make the informed decision about whether Cannabis is the right medicine for them, and at the same time letting them know all the laws surrounding Medicinal Marijuana in their area, all while helping expand political activism and providing handy recipes and guides to help them grow their own Organic medicine.
