= Matt Jaffe =

American singer-songwriter (born 1995)

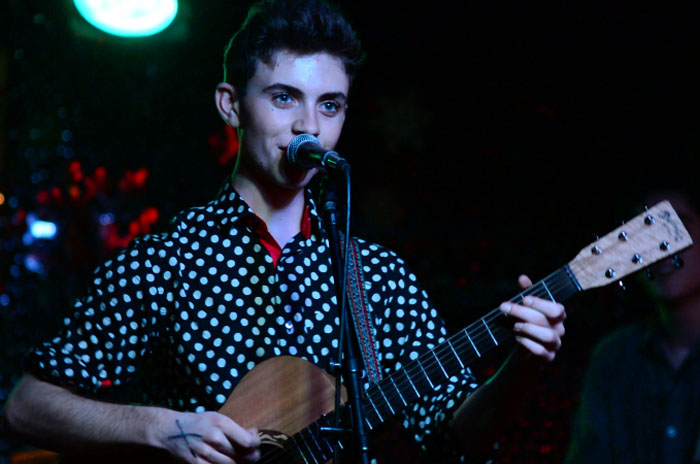
- Jaffe in 2015

Background information
- Born: Matthew Frederick Jaffe; April 20, 1995 (age 31); San Francisco, California, U.S.
- Genres: Rock; power pop; post-punk; new wave
- Occupation: Singer-songwriter
- Instruments: Vocals; guitar; violin; piano
- Years active: 2006–present
- Website: mattjaffemusic.com

Matthew Frederick Jaffe (born April 20, 1995) is an independent American singer-songwriter, guitarist and founder of the bands Matt Jaffe & The Distractions,& Lost Cosmonauts from San Francisco, California.

== Biography ==
Jaffe learnt his first chords by watching David Byrne play in the Jonathan Demme–directed Talking Heads concert film, Stop Making Sense. Four years later, Jerry Harrison, keyboardist and guitarist for Talking Heads, discovered Jaffe at an open-mic showcase.

Harrison offered to record some of Jaffe's music. Before entering his junior year in high school, Jaffe had recorded 50 acoustic demos in Harrison's studio in Sausalito, California. During their collaboration, Harrison became a friend and advisor.

In 2013, Jaffe entered Yale University, but left school a year and a half later to continue to pursue music. While touring to support the EP, the band has opened for Mavis Staples and The Damnwells. The band embarked on its first extensive U.S. tour in 2015, opening for Blues Traveler. In 2018, Jaffe retired the Distractions name.

== Discography ==
(with The Distractions)

Blast Off (EP, Elm City Music, 2015)

California's Burning (Album, 2017)

(Solo)

The Spirit Catches You (Album, 2018)

Undertoad + Kintsugi (Double Album, 2021)

White Roses in the Snow (Album, 2022)

Gone Enough to Miss (Album, 2024)

Rooms by the Sea (Album, 2025)
