= The Cow Who Wanted to Be a Hamburger =

- Directed by: Bill Plympton
- Written by: Bill Plympton
- Produced by: Bill Plympton
- Music by: Corey A. Jackson; Nicole Renaud
- Production company: Bill Plympton Studios
- Release date: March 12, 2010 (SXSW)
- Running time: 5 minutes
- Country: United States
- Language: English

The Cow Who Wanted to Be a Hamburger is an American independent short film directed by Bill Plympton. It was screened first at the Annecy Film Festival and after a running at numerous other festival was nominated for Best Short Film at the 38th Annie Awards.

== Production ==
Director Bill Plympton said the film "was made almost by accident".

== Awards ==
The Cow Who Wanted to Be a Hamburger was screened in the official selection of the Annecy Film Festival, being nominated for best short film. It is one of the five nominated short animated films at the 38th Annie Awards and one of the six nominated short animated films at Oaxaca Film Fest. Also, it is one of the ten pre-selected short animated films for the 2011 Academy Awards.

== Preservation ==
The Academy Film Archive preserved The Cow Who Wanted to Be a Hamburger in 2016.
