= Acrobatty Bunny =

1946 Bugs Bunny cartoon

- Title card
- Directed by: Robert McKimson
- Story by: Warren Foster
- Starring: Mel Blanc
- Music by: Carl W. Stalling
- Animation by: Arthur Davis; Cal Dalton; Richard Bickenbach; Don Williams (unc.); Anatole Kirsanoff (unc.)
- Layouts by: Cornett Wood
- Backgrounds by: Richard H. Thomas
- Color process: Technicolor
- Production company: Warner Bros. Cartoons
- Distributed by: Warner Bros. Pictures
- Release date: June 29, 1946
- Running time: 7:43
- Language: English

Acrobatty Bunny is a 1946 Warner Bros. Looney Tunes short directed by Robert McKimson. The short was released on June 29, 1946, and stars Bugs Bunny and Nero the Lion. This was the first cartoon McKimson directed that starred Bugs Bunny.

== Plot ==
Bugs Bunny meets Nero the Lion, animated by Richard Bickenbach.

Bugs Bunny has an encounter with Nero, a lion residing above his rabbit hole amidst the setup of a circus. Bugs navigates a series of comical escapades as he evades Nero's attempts to capture him, leading to a lively chase throughout the circus grounds.

In a turn of events, Bugs dons a clown disguise to engage Nero in playful antics, but their interaction escalates into a frenzied pursuit under the circus tent. After Bugs does the high dive into the wooden bucket that Nero uses as a funnel, Bugs shows Nero a pair of rubber heels. Employing his ingenuity, Bugs outwits Nero by using the heels, bouncing away to which Nero follows and tricks Nero into following him after jumping into the muzzle of the human cannonball cannon. Nero dives in but ends up getting stuck headfirst in the muzzle of a cannon. Nero struggles trying to get out while Bugs emerges out of the rear hatch of the cannon. Bugs lights the fuse, and then attempts to stuff a roaring Nero further into the cannon wedging him tight. Bugs takes a Quick Look at his work, and runs off before the cannon explodes. The cannon blows apart unable to propel Nero due to Bugs stuffing him in tight, leaving a skirt of metal around Nero’s waist. This culminates in a humorous spectacle where Nero unwittingly performs a hula dance while Bugs entertains with a ukulele.

Bugs then breaks the fourth wall, addressing the audience in a jovial manner and offering their services for various events, all while continuing to provide entertainment through music.

== Reception ==
Animation critic Jerry Beck writes, "Nonstop action and gags, Acrobatty Bunny is a pure Bugs Bunny cartoon, demonstrating what the rabbit does best: using his brains to heckle an aggressive bully and stay one step ahead of his opponent. Robert McKimson's very first Bugs Bunny cartoon is one of the funniest ever made."

== Home media ==
The cartoon is available on the Marx Brothers' Night in Casablanca DVD (2004). It can also be found on the Looney Tunes Golden Collection: Volume 3 DVD, and the Looney Tunes Platinum Collection: Volume 3 Blu-ray.

== See also ==
- Bugs Bunny filmography
- Looney Tunes and Merrie Melodies filmography (1940–1949)

Preceded by Hair-Raising Hare	Bugs Bunny Cartoons; 1946	Succeeded by Racketeer Rabbit
