= Your Face (film) =

- Directed by: Bill Plympton
- Music by: Maureen McElheron
- Production company: Plymptoons Studio
- Distributed by: Media, Inc.
- Release date: 1987
- Running time: 3 minutes
- Country: United States
- Language: English

Your Face is a 1987 animated short film by Bill Plympton. It involves a man seated in a chair crooning about the face of his lover, and as he sings, his own face starts to distort in various ways. His face is distorted into many different shapes, such as a balloon, a cube and an ice cream cone. His song ends abruptly when a mouth opens in the floor and swallows him and the chair whole; after the closing credits, the mouth reappears and licks its lips.

== Music ==
The vocals are by Maureen McElheron, known for composing the songs in The Tune, also by Bill Plympton. After the song was recorded, it was slowed by one-third, giving the desired and unusual effect, also making the voice more masculine.

== Lyrics ==
The song is original, made specifically for this short film, and the lyrics depict a metaphorical description of someone's face by using musical vocabulary to describe the beauty of their features.

== Legacy ==
The short received a nomination for Academy Award for Best Animated Short Film at the 60th Academy Awards.

A variation of this short was used as the couch gag on The Simpsons's 29th season episode "3 Scenes Plus a Tag from a Marriage", with Homer Simpson's face replacing the original man, and Dan Castellaneta singing the vocals. This version ends with the Simpson family sitting on their living room couch.

Your Face was preserved by the Academy Film Archive in 2015.

The short was restored and uploaded to Bill Plympton's YouTube channel in 2024.
