= Billy Bob Buttons =

Writer

Edward Hugh Trayer
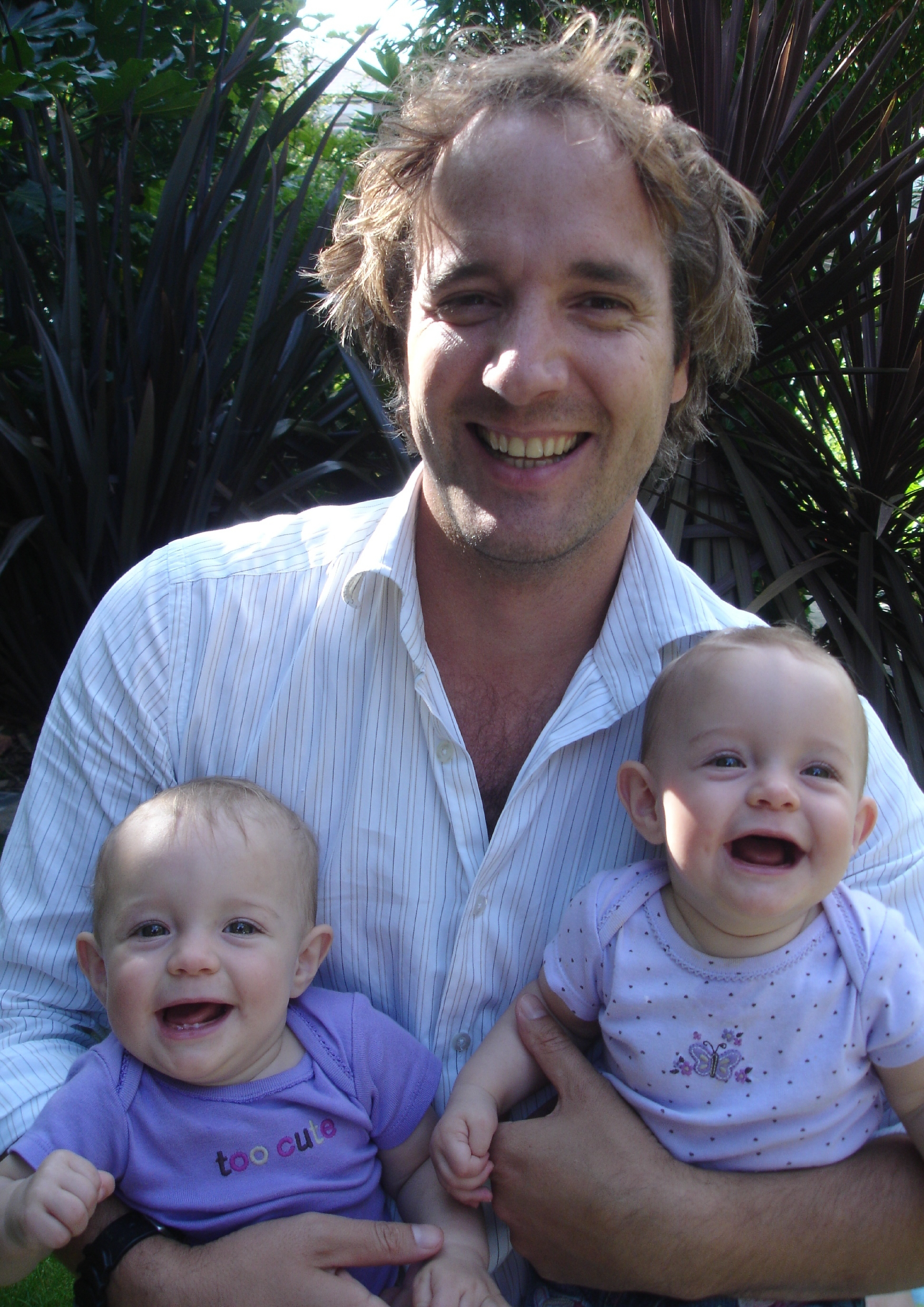
- Born: September 25, 1970 (age 56); London, England
- Occupation: Author
- Writing career
- Pen name: Edward Hugh Trayer

Billy Bob Buttons, the pen name of Edward Hugh Trayer (born 25 September 1970), is a British-born children, young adult and adult novelist. He is the author of sixteen books to date including: Felicity Brady and the Wizard's Bookshop (Galibrath's Will, Articulus Quest, Incantus Gothmog, Glumweedy's Devil and Crowl's Creepers), The Gullfoss LegendsTor Assassin Hunter, Tor Wolf Rising, Tiffany Sparrow and I Think I Murdered Miss. He is published by The Wishing Shelf Press.

In 2011, Felicity Brady and the Wizard's Bookshop was longlisted for the International Rubery Book Award, and Tor Assassin Hunter was a runner up in the 2012 UK People's Book Prize. In 2014, I Think I Murdered Miss won the UK People's Book Prize. The award was presented to Billy Bob Buttons at a ceremony in London.

His picture book The Boy Who Piddled in His Grandad's Slippers was produced as an animated short film in 2018.

He visits over to 200 UK primary schools every year delivering literacy workshops; it is estimated he has met with over 250,000 children over the last six years. He is also the founder and organiser of The Wishing Shelf Independent Book Awards.

He is also the author of two books for adults written under the pen name Hickory Crowl: Tor Assassin Hunter, Book 1: Wolf Rising and a murder/mystery entitled Bewitcher.

Born in Yorkshire, Trayer has a wife, Therese Råsbäck, and three children.
