= Jay Cavanaugh =

American activist (1949–2005)

Dr. Jay Cavanaugh
- Born: 1949
- Died: 2005 (aged 55–56)
- Known for: National Director of the American Alliance for Medical Cannabis
- Medical career
- Profession: Drug Abuse Recovery Program's executive director

Dr. Jay Cavanaugh (1949–2005) was a prominent supporter of medical marijuana. He was appointed to the California State Board of Pharmacy for ten years by three Governors. He also worked in drug abuse recovery. In 2001 he became National Director of the American Alliance for Medical Cannabis.

== Biography ==
From 1970-73 he worked at the Los Angeles County Health Department as an outpatient drug treatment caseworker. From 1973-89 he was the Interagency Drug Abuse Recovery Programs first paid executive director. The program was created by community organizers supported by Los Angeles County and run by volunteers until it was professionalized by the hiring of Jay and other staff. From 1980-82 He served on the California State Board of Pharmacy, and was reappointed twice, ending in 1990.

He assisted in developing and coordinating drug enforcement against pharmacies, wholesalers, and manufacturers for diverting narcotics. He developed and implemented the Recovering Pharmacist Program. He assisted in ensuring pharmacist consultation with patients.

=== Medical cannabis support ===
In 1994 he completed a PhD in Molecular Biology at Tulane University. In 1997 he became a medical marijuana patient and Los Angeles County Director of the American Alliance for Medical Cannabis. In 2001 he became National Director of the American Alliance for Medical Cannabis. He also provided crisis intervention consultation and employee assistance training for NASA, the Los Angeles Lakers, the Los Angeles Police Department and the Los Angeles Unified School District.

Cavanaugh published an online article entitled "Reckless Disregard", in which he stated:

Don't ask for the truth in the ads we all read and see ad nauseam. Don't ask for the truth on the Internet either. Ask a health question on nearly any major health website and you'll get information from experts that are consultants for the drug companies and the sites themselves are sponsored and censored by the same drug companies. Any mention of cheap, safe, and effective cannabis as medicine is banned as promoting illegal activities. This as pop-up ads tell us that we need Viagra to make a marriage work, Prozac for when times seem dark, and above all that little purple pill.

We are fighting the wrong drug war on the wrong people and we are paying for this terrible mistake through great suffering and loss of life. Intentional and reckless disregard for human life is the very definition of homicide. Why then are we punishing the sick growing medical marijuana while ignoring the real holocaust being perpetrated by supposedly responsible and humanitarian companies? In today's America greed is only rewarded and mass murder ignored.

- The robber barons of the drug industry, the real drug pushers of America, are determined that we live or die or suffer in ways that help their bottom line regardless of science, logic, medicine, compassion, or any other consideration.
- When considering the witches brew of concoctions the drug companies want to pour down my throat and into my veins I say a resounding "Just Say No".
  - Dr. Jay Cavanaugh, Overgrow forums, March 11, 2003.

== Family ==
He was survived by his wife Nancy (a nurse) and children Erin and John-Paul. His father was Big Dave Cavanaugh an American composer, arranger, musician and producer of Frank Sinatra, Nat "King" Cole, Peggy Lee, Kay Starr, and Nancy Wilson. He won a Grammy in 1959.

== Articles ==
- Cavanaugh, Jay (2003-01-21). "Reckless Disregard". DrugWar.com.
- "The Plight of The Chronically Ill". AAMC. 2002.
- "The New King George". Christians for Cannabis. 2002-05-15. Archived from the original on January 1, 2010.
- "The New Salem". DrugWar.org. 2003-02-27.
