= 22 for 30 =

- The Simpsons episode
- Episode no.: Season 28; Episode 16
- Directed by: Chris Clements
- Written by: Joel H. Cohen
- Production code: WABF10
- Original air date: March 12, 2017

Guest appearances
- Stephen Curry as himself; Earl Mann as Narrator (Eddie Muntz); Joe Mantegna as Fat Tony

Episode features
- Couch gag: Animated by Bill Plympton. The family is crudely-drawn on the couch. The scene pans out to reveal Maggie is the artist. Each family member is subsequently drawn by the next oldest, ending with Homer Simpson holding a spare pencil and a donut in his non-drawing hand. When he bites into the donut, he stabs himself in the eye with the pencil.

Episode chronology
← Previous "Kamp Krustier"	Next → "A Father's Watch"
- The Simpsons season 28

"22 for 30" is the seventeenth episode of the twenty-eighth season of the American animated television series The Simpsons, and the 613th episode of the series overall. The episode was directed by Chris Clements and written by Joel H. Cohen. It aired in the United States on Fox on March 12, 2017.

In a parody of 30 for 30, Bart goes from delinquent with detention to the star basketball player at Springfield Elementary. Lisa covers Bart's success for the school paper, and Homer becomes the team's coach. Things go awry when Bart gets involved with the mafia. Earl Mann guest starred as the narrator. Basketball player Stephen Curry appeared as himself. The episode received positive reviews.

== Plot ==
The story is done as a documentary about the rise and the fall of Bart Simpson's career on the Springfield Elementary School basketball team. It all started with a joke that got him in the longest detention in history, where he started shooting baskets in the detention room wastebasket. Bart became a starter and then a star, reveling in his abilities while also letting his success go to his head. Homer Simpson became the coach of the team, and Bart started disrespecting Homer, leading to ugly clashes between them. Fat Tony noticed this and came up with a plan to enrich both himself and Bart via Bart's unwitting point shaving practices (the mobsters would tell Bart how much they wanted the SES team to win by, and Bart didn't know this was based on a betting line that the mob would then cover and make a lot of cash from).

At the City Champions Final Four, Bart won the game after Homer choked him. However, Bart found out how much money Fat Tony was making, meaning that Fat Tony wanted him to lose the finals. The town hated him for that.

In the game, Milhouse (who was Fat Tony's other point shaving asset) tried to keep Bart from hitting the game-winning shot but failed. Lisa then used her journalism skills to get Fat Tony to back off his plan to murder Bart. When the mob boss was Bart's age, he was an incompetent player for the only city league team where he could play for: an all-girls' team.

Homer and Marge then tell the documentary crew that Bart's heyday didn't last much longer, as the minute he moved up to a league he was overshadowed by a tall kid on the court. The status of Lisa and Milhouse is outlined (along with a cameo by Stephen Curry), and the narrator of the story reveals himself to be Nelson's dad, Eddie Muntz, who gives Nelson sleeves for his vest and stays long enough just for a picture of the family to be taken before he disappears again.

== Production ==
For the fifth time, the couch gag was created by animator Bill Plympton. Voiceover artist Earl Mann was cast as the narrator for this episode.

This episode is included as a bonus episode on the DVD set for the eighteenth season.

== Cultural references ==
The episode is a parody of ESPN's sports documentary series 30 for 30.

== Reception ==
Dennis Perkins of The A.V. Club gave the episode a B stating, "'22 For 30' dresses up The Simpsons’ formula in the gym togs of ESPN’s 30 For 30 sports documentary series, and, as far as stunts go, it’s a well-executed one. The arc of a traditional Simpsons episode and that of the average 'troubled sports figure' doc mesh up neatly, as Bart, after honing his crumpled paper ball shooting skills in an extra long detention, becomes the star of Springfield Elementary’s hoops team. Conflict comes in various forms: Bart adopts an entitled attitude; Homer coaching the team leads to father-son drama; and, naturally, Fat Tony pressures Bart into a little point-shaving. The episode—woven together further by the silky-smooth tones of professional sports voiceover legend Earl Mann—works by essentially wallpapering over the choppy and under-realized storytelling endemic to much present-day Simpsons with the glib packaging of the feel-good (or feel-bad) sports narrative. It’s a cheat, but an ambitious and well-realized one that results in a refreshing little season 28 detour."

Tony Sokol of Den of Geek gave the episode 3.5 out of 5 stars. He called it one of the funniest episodes but did not like the perceived slickness.

"22 for 30" scored a 1.1 rating with a 4 share and was watched by 2.61 million people, making it Fox's highest rated show of the night.
