= Racketeer Rabbit =

1946 film by Friz Freleng

- Title card
- Directed by: I. Freleng
- Story by: Michael Maltese
- Starring: Mel Blanc
- Music by: Carl Stalling
- Animation by: Gerry Chiniquy; Manuel Perez; Virgil Ross; Ken Champin
- Layouts by: Hawley Pratt
- Backgrounds by: Paul Julian
- Color process: Technicolor
- Production company: Warner Bros. Cartoons
- Distributed by: Warner Bros. Pictures; The Vitaphone Corporation
- Release date: September 14, 1946
- Running time: 8 minutes
- Language: English

Racketeer Rabbit is a 1946 Warner Bros. Looney Tunes cartoon directed by Friz Freleng. The short was released on September 14, 1946, and features Bugs Bunny.

== Plot ==
Bugs Bunny seeks shelter for the night and unwittingly ends up in an abandoned gothic farmhouse, which serves as the hideout for two gangsters, Rocky (caricature of Edward G. Robinson) and Hugo (caricature of Peter Lorre). A chaotic series of events unfolds when Rocky and Hugo return, pursued by rival gangsters, leading to a frenzied gunfight inside the farmhouse. Despite the chaos, Bugs nonchalantly interrupts the mayhem to attend to his basic needs before returning to bed.

During a division of the loot from a recent heist, Bugs cleverly tricks Rocky into relinquishing all the money by assuming various disguises. However, Rocky catches on and demands the money back, leading to a confrontation. Bugs outwits Rocky again by posing as different characters, ultimately causing Rocky's humiliation.

In a final showdown, Bugs assumes the role of a gangster and engages in a comedic altercation with Rocky, culminating in Bugs orchestrating a mock police raid. Using his wit and ingenuity, Bugs ultimately triumphs over Rocky, leaving the gangster defeated and fleeing the scene in a panic. Bugs, with a sigh, reflects on the inability of some individuals to handle humorous situations before returning to his carefree demeanor.

== Details ==
When entering the house, Bugs remarks "Huh? Sounds like Inner Sanctum!", a reference to the popular mystery radio program that aired from January 7, 1941, to October 5, 1952. Bugs impersonates Bugsy Siegel and flips a coin like George Raft in Scarface (1932). His Brooklynite accent serves to complete the image of a tough crook.

The short's copyright was renewed in 1973. (Note: Under R562346)

== See also ==
- Bugs Bunny filmography
- Bugs and Thugs in which Bugs Bunny treats Rocky and Mugsy to hide the villains' routine
- Bah, Humduck! A Looney Tunes Christmas in which Bugs Bunny treats Daffy Duck to hide the villains' routine

Preceded by Acrobatty Bunny	Bugs Bunny Cartoons; 1946	Succeeded by The Big Snooze
