= Cheatin' (film) =

2013 American animated comedy drama

- Promotional Poster
- Directed by: Bill Plympton
- Written by: Bill Plympton
- Produced by: Bill Plympton
- Starring: Sophia Takal; Jeremy Baumann
- Edited by: Kevin Palmer
- Music by: Nicole Renaud
- Production company: Plymptoons Studio
- Distributed by: levelFILM
- Release dates: October 11, 2013 (Sitges); August 15, 2014
- Running time: 76 minutes
- Country: United States

Cheatin' is a 2013 American adult animated romantic comedy-drama film by Bill Plympton.

== Plot ==
Ella, a beautiful woman tired of unwanted attention from men, strolls through a carnival while reading a book. A barker talks her into trying the bumper cars, but the result is a perilous accident that leaves Ella trapped. A stranger, the handsome and muscular Jake, rescues her, and the two fall in love and are soon married. Various women attempt to seduce Jake, but he remains steadfastly faithful.

Enraged by this slight, one of these women stages a photo of Ella, changing in a room full of male mannequins, and gives it to Jake. Jake, distraught by what he believes to be his wife's infidelity, contemplates suicide, but soon takes solace in a series of affairs. When Ella discovers this infidelity, she tries to hire a man to kill Jake, before finding a magician who has a machine that will allow her to temporarily transport her consciousness into the bodies of the women Jake is sleeping with.

== Cast ==
- Sophia Takal as Ella, a beautiful woman who used to be lonely until she met the man of her life, Jake. She starts off as an innocent, sweet, and strong young woman, but once she finds her husband sleeping with other women, she becomes more vengeful and hatred.
- Jeremy Baumann as Jake, a handsome, buff man and Ella's husband. At first loving and devoted to her, but after assuming she had an affair with a bunch of other men, he decides to do the same.

== Background ==
The Cheatin' animation consists of monochrome pencil-sketches, which are then digitally colored and composited to create a watercolor-like image. All animation was drawn by Plympton himself, but the colorization and compositing was done by a staff of other artists. The watercolor work was so intensive that he had to hire four extra artists, and due to the extra costs the project ran out of money, which is why Plympton launched a crowdfunding campaign on Kickstarter.

The campaign was launched on Dec 3, 2012, with a goal of $75,000. On February 1, 2013, the campaign completed with $100,916. On August 22, 2014, an online streaming version was delivered to backers. Physical copies of the film began shipping that December.

== Accolades ==
List of Awards and Nominations
Year	Award	Category	Recipients and nominees	Results
2013	51st Gijon International Film Festival	ANIMAFicx Award	Cheatin'	Won
2014	42nd Annual Annie Awards	Best Animated Feature	Cheatin'	Nominated
2014	42nd Annual Annie Awards	Directing in an Animated Feature Production	Bill Plympton	Nominated
2014	42nd Annual Annie Awards	Music in a Feature Production	Nicole Renaud	Nominated
