= The Tune =

1992 animated American film

- DVD cover
- Directed by: Bill Plympton
- Written by: Bill Plympton; Maureen McElheron; P. C. Vey
- Produced by: Bill Plympton
- Starring: Daniel Neiden; Maureen McElheron; Marty Nelson; Emily Bindiger; Chris Hoffman; Jimmy Ceribello; Ned Reynolds; Jeffrey Knight; Jennifer Senko
- Cinematography: John Donnelly
- Edited by: Merril Stern
- Music by: Maureen McElheron
- Distributed by: October Films
- Release dates: April 25, 1992 (Sundance); September 4, 1992 (U.S.)
- Running time: 69 minutes
- Country: United States
- Language: English
- Budget: $175,000

The Tune is a 1992 independent animated musical-comedy film directed by Bill Plympton.

== Plot summary ==
Del, a hard-working songwriter, is trying to write the perfect song for his slimeball boss, Mr. Mega, so he can keep his job and his girlfriend, Didi. As he rushes to work, he gets lost in a cloverleaf highway and ends up lost in a town called Flooby Nooby, where he meets the town's singing and swingin' mayor, an Elvis-impersonating dog, a noseless cab driver, and a psychotic bellhop as he tries to get to Mr. Mega's office to deliver the song.

== Production ==
After collecting all of his shorts done in a five year period on a cassette, and noticed that it was 58 minutes of animation in total, he realized it was possible to make a feature. The Tune was Bill Plympton's first feature-length film, and incorporates earlier shorts released by Plympton, including The Wiseman (1991), Dig My Do (1990), and Tango Schmango (1990). The movie was inspired by Yellow Submarine, and was self-funded by selling his shorts to MTV, BBC and other customers. Halfway through he started to run out of money, and made two commercials; one for NutraSweet and another for Trivial Pursuit, that allowed him to complete the movie, which took two years to make. Its music was composed by Maureen McElheron, a longtime friend of Plympton's who has composed the music for most of his films.

== Reception ==
The Tune premiered April 25, 1992 at the Sundance Film Festival. It was also shown at the Cannes Film Festival before being released in the United States on September 4, 1992. At least one critic observed that the incorporated shorts seemed out-of-place with the film's original material. The Tune was nominated for a number of awards in 1992 and 1993. The film was preserved by the Academy Film Archive in 2016.

== See also ==
- The Point!
- List of animated feature films
