= Bill Plympton =

American illustrator, animator, and film director

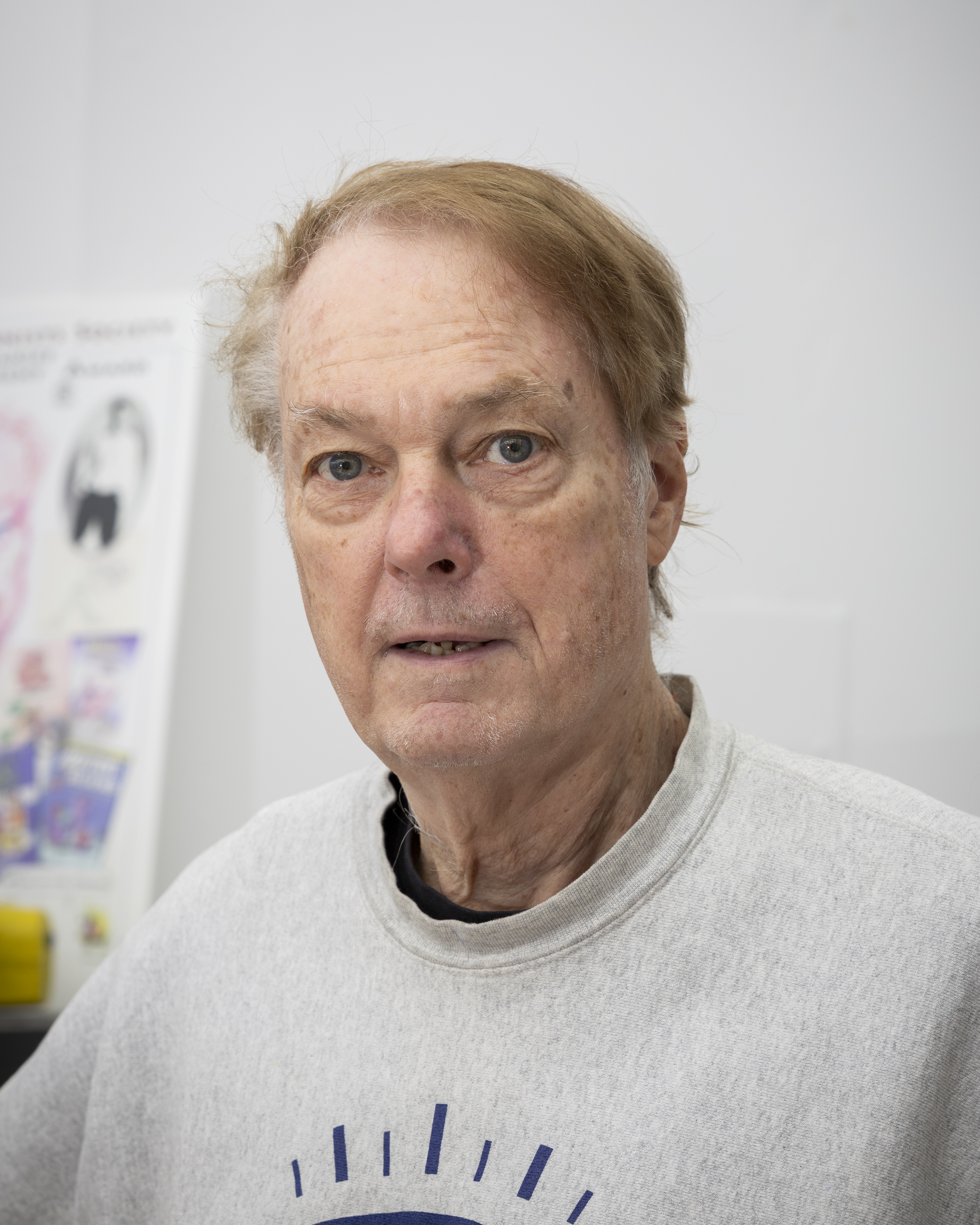
- Plympton in 2025
- Born: April 30, 1946 (age 80); Portland, Oregon, U.S.
- Education: Portland State University; School of Visual Arts
- Known for: Animation
- Notable work: Your Face, Guard Dog, The Tune, Cheatin'
- Relatives: Martha Plimpton (cousin)

Signature
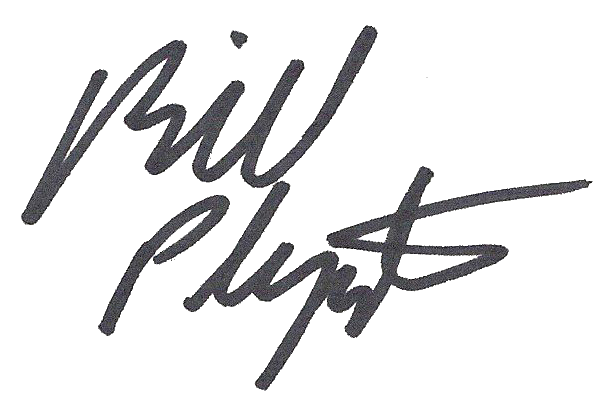

Bill Plympton (born April 30, 1946) is an American animator, graphic designer, cartoonist, and filmmaker best known for his 1987 Academy Award–nominated animated short Your Face and his series of shorts featuring a dog character starting with 2004's Guard Dog.

== Early life ==
Plympton was born in Portland, Oregon, the son of Wilda Jean (Jerman) and Donald F. Plympton, and was raised on a farm in nearby Oregon City with five siblings. From 1964 to 1968, he studied Graphic Design at Portland State University, where he was a member of the film society and worked on the yearbook. In 1968, he transferred to the School of Visual Arts in New York City, where he majored in cartooning. He graduated from SVA in 1969.

== Career ==
Plympton's illustrations and cartoons have been published in The New York Times and the weekly newspaper The Village Voice, as well as in the magazines Vogue, Rolling Stone, Vanity Fair, Penthouse, and National Lampoon. His political cartoon strip Plympton, which began in 1975 in the SoHo Weekly News, eventually was syndicated and appeared in over 20 newspapers.

In 1988, his animated short Your Face was nominated for the Academy Award for Best Animated Short Film. He also became known for other animated short films, including 25 Ways to Quit Smoking (1989) and Enemies (1991), the latter of which was part of the Animania series on MTV, where many of his other shorts were shown.

In 1991, Plympton won the Prix Spécial du Jury at the Cannes Film Festival for Push Comes to Shove which was featured on MTV's animated series Liquid Television. In 1992, his self-financed, first feature-length animated film, The Tune debuted at the Sundance Film Festival. His work also appeared on the 1992–1993 Fox comedy series The Edge. In 1993, he made his first live action film, J. Lyle.

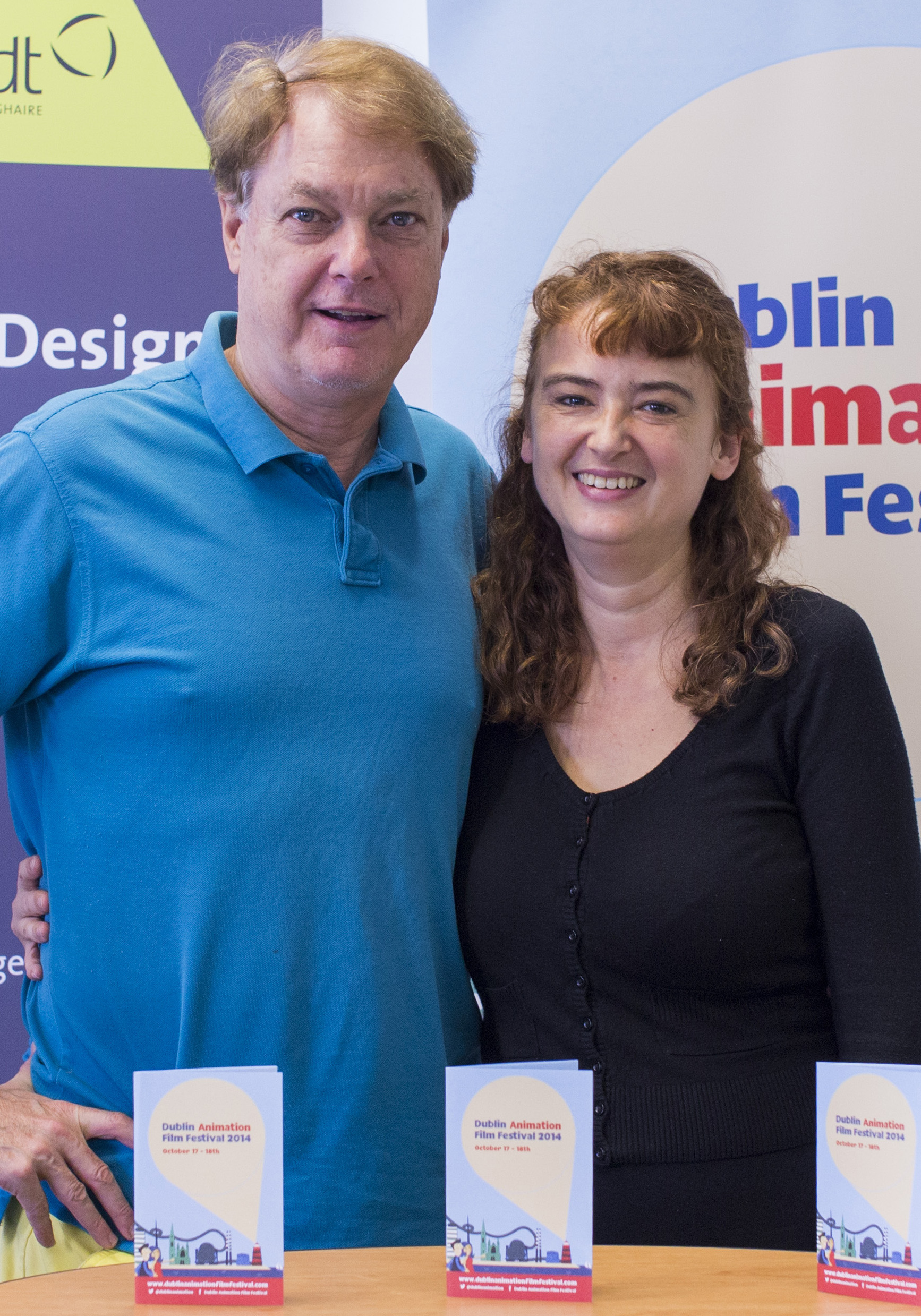
Bill and Sandrine Plympton in 2014

In 1995, he contributed animation and graphics to a computer game collection, Take Your Best Shot. In 1997, Plympton's work was also presented in Europe. In November, the Geneva-based publisher Éditions Paquet published the French-language collection ''Toute la vérité sur le sujet''. The following month, from December 6 to 20, Plympton was featured at the Geneva event "BD Fleuves", held at 1 rue de la Truite, with Paquet among the participating partners.

In 1997, Plympton released Mondo Plympton, an animated retrospective of his career combining earlier shorts and excerpts with new sequences depicting Plympton as an animated character discussing his work as a cartoonist and independent animator. Following its festival premiere at the World Animation Celebration and a screening at Seattle's Masters of Animation conference, Plympton self-distributed the film to selected U.S. theaters. Reviewing its San Francisco theatrical run, Edward Guthmann described the film as a career retrospective in which Plympton placed his earlier films in autobiographical context.

He also published a comic book in 2003, The Sleazy Cartoons of Bill Plympton. The actress Martha Plimpton, a distant relative of his, served as associate producer on Plympton's animated feature Hair High (2004), doing much of the casting. The movie's voice cast included her father Keith Carradine and her uncle David Carradine.

== Later works ==
Guard Dog (2004) was also nominated for the Academy Award for Best Animated Short Film. In 2005, Plympton animated a music video for Kanye West's "Heard 'Em Say" and the following year, he created the music video for "Weird Al" Yankovic's "Don't Download This Song". Plympton contributed animation to the 2006 History Channel series 10 Days That Unexpectedly Changed America, to illustrate the events of Shays' Rebellion. Together with other independent New York City animators, he has released two DVDs of animated shorts, both titled Avoid Eye Contact.

Plympton's 2008 80-minute feature, Idiots and Angels presented by Terry Gilliam, had no dialogue. The film premiered at the Tribeca Film Festival on 26 April 2008,

In 2011, Alexia Anastasio completed a documentary on Plympton's life, Adventures in Plymptoons!, released in September 2012 direct-to-DVD and on video-on-demand.

In 2011, Plympton collaborated with child film critic Perry Chen on Ingrid Pitt: Beyond the Forest, a 2011 short animated film directed by Kevin Sean Michaels, about actress and Holocaust survivor Ingrid Pitt.

Plympton's seventh animated feature, Cheatin' (2013), was partly financed through a Kickstarter campaign that raised more than $100,000. Plympton personally drew more than 40,000 frames for the film. Cheatin' won the Jury Award for a Feature Film at the 2014 Annecy International Animation Film Festival, as well as the ANIMAFICX Award at the 2013 Gijón International Film Festival.

Plympton directed the segment "On Eating and Drinking" in the 2014 animated film The Prophet, adapted from Kahlil Gibran's book The Prophet.

In 2014, Plympton was one of four artists featured in the Icons of Animation exhibition at New York's Society of Illustrators, alongside Peter de Sève, William Joyce and Carlos Nine. The exhibition was accompanied by an Academy of Motion Picture Arts and Sciences program in which Plympton and de Sève participated in a panel discussion on the craft of animation.

In 2016, Plympton completed two feature-length projects. Hitler's Folly was conceived as a satirical mockumentary, while Revengeance was made in collaboration with animator Jim Lujan. Lujan wrote, designed and voiced Revengeance, while Plympton produced, co-directed and animated the film. Revengeance received the Grand Jury Prize in the Animated Feature Competition at the 2017 Nashville Film Festival.

In 2018, Plympton created the animated series of shorts Trump Bites for The New York Times. One installment, Trump and Putin: A Love Story, depicting Donald Trump and Vladimir Putin in an intimate relationship, drew criticism for relying on imagery that some commentators described as homophobic.

In 2019, Plympton received the Pulcinella Career Award at Cartoons on the Bay in Turin, recognizing his career in independent animation.

His 2021 short Demi's Panic, written by Danny Leonard and inspired by experiences of the COVID-19 pandemic, marked an unusually dramatic departure from Plympton's predominantly comic work.

In 2020, Plympton launched a Kickstarter campaign for a new animated musical western, Slide. The campaign raised approximately $60,000 from 400 backers. The film screened at the 2023 Annecy International Animation Film Festival and at other festivals during 2023 and 2024. Plympton's studio states that the production officially wrapped in late 2024. In November 2025, the film was released theatrically in France as Duel à Monte-Carlo del Norte.

In 2023, the National Cartoonists Society awarded Plympton the Milton Caniff Lifetime Achievement Award for his career as a cartoonist.

In August 2025, Plympton announced a new animated short entitled Whale 52 - Suite for Man, Boy, and Whale, which had its New York premiere the following month at the IFC Center during a multi-day Plympton retrospective presented by "Weird Al" Yankovic. Another Plympton short, Duckville, also had its New York premiere during the retrospective. Whale 52 subsequently screened at the 2025 Woodstock Film Festival and was among the animated shorts that qualified for consideration for the Academy Award for Best Animated Short Film. Although it was not nominated for an Academy Award, in February 2026 Whale 52 received the Crystal Bear for Best Short Film at the Berlin International Film Festival.

In April 2026, Plympton received the Romics d'Oro at the 36th edition of Romics in Rome, in recognition of his career in independent animation.

== Technique ==
By sometimes alternating the same drawings back and forth, it creates a shimmering effect, known in animation as a 'boil', that makes it look like the images are pulsating.

== Legacy ==
A collection of more than 180 Plympton items is held at the Academy Film Archive. The archive has preserved Plympton's films such as Your Face, The Tune, Guard Dog, and The Cow Who Wanted to Be a Hamburger.

His films have featured in the Animation Show of Shows including Your Face, Guard Dog, Eat (2001), The Fan and the Flower (2005), and Santa: The Fascist Years (2009).

On June 1, 2026, Plympton was inducted into the Animation Hall of Fame.

== Personal life ==
On December 23, 2011, Plympton married animator/artist/illustrator Sandrine Flament. Their son, Lucas, was born in September 2012.

== Influences ==
Plympton has stated he has many influences, the biggest being the work of the Walt Disney with others including Tex Avery, Bob Clampett, Robert Crumb, Milton Glaser, Charles Addams, Charles M. Schulz, Frank Capra, Bob Godfrey, Chuck Jones, Tomi Ungerer, Quentin Tarantino, Jacques Tati, Don Martin, Harvey Kurtzman, Spain Rodriguez and Jules Feiffer. He said I Married a Strange Person! "was influenced by Peter Jackson, some of his earlier films ... where he used gore and violence and blood as humor." He also included references to Jacques Tati, Carlos Nine, and Milt Kahl.

== Awards ==
- 1988 Academy Award nomination for Short Animation: "Your Face"
- 1991 Jury Prize for Short Films, "Push Comes to Shove", Cannes Film Festival
- 2004 Inkpot Award winner
- 2005 Academy Award nomination for Short Animation: "Guard Dog"
- 2006 Winsor McCay Award Annie Awards by ASIFA-Hollywood
- 2011 20th Annual Cinema St. Louis Film Festival (traditional name: St. Louis International Film Festival), Lifetime Achievement Award
- 2011 Burbank International Film Festival, Pioneer in Theatrical Animation Award
- 2011 Action On Film International Film Festival, Lifetime Achievement Award
- 2013 ANIMAFicx Award, 51st Gijón International Film Festival: "Cheatin'"
- 2014 Annecy International Animation Film Festival, Jury Award for a Feature Film: Cheatin'
- 2017 Nashville Film Festival, Grand Jury Prize, Animated Feature Competition: Revengeance
- 2019 Cartoons on the Bay, Pulcinella Career Award
- 2023 National Cartoonists Society, Milton Caniff Lifetime Achievement Award
- 2023 Los Angeles Animation Festival
  - Winner Best Feature Film: "Slide"
  - Best Feature Film Director: "Slide"
  - Winner Music Video: "Lipstick of the Brave"
- 2026 Berlin International Film Festival, Winner Crystal Bear for Best Short Film: "Whale 52"
- 2026 Iron Mule Short Comedy Film Festival, Winner Judges Award for "Duckville"
- 2026 Romics, Romics d'Oro

== Filmography ==
=== Animated features ===
- The Tune (1992)
- I Married a Strange Person! (1997)
- Mutant Aliens (2001)
- Hair High (2004)
- Idiots and Angels (2008)
- Cheatin' (2013)
- Revengeance (2016)
- Slide (2024)

=== Documentaries ===
- Walt Curtis: The Peckerneck Poet (1997)
- Fuck (2005; provided animated sequences)
- Adventures in Plymptoons! by Alexia Anastasio (2011)

=== Live-action features ===
- J. Lyle (1993)
- Guns on the Clackamas(1995)
- Walt Curtis, the Peckerneck Poet (1997)
- Hitler's Folly (a mockumentary) (2016)

=== Animated shorts ===
Source unless otherwise noted:

- The Turn On (1968; 2:00) (Note: Produced in collage)
- Lucas the Ear of Corn (1977; 4:00) (Note: abandoned)
- Boomtown (1985; 6:00)
- Love in the Fast Lane (1985; 3:00)
- Your Face (1987; 3:10)
- Drawing Lesson #2 (1988; 6:00)
- One of Those Days (1988: 7:50)
- How to Kiss (1989; 6:35)
- 25 Ways to Quit Smoking (1989; 5:00)
- Plymptoons (1990; 6:45)
- Tango Schmango (1991)
- Dig My Do (1990; 4:00)
- The Wiseman (1990: 4:30)
- Push Comes to Shove (1991; 6:30)
- Draw (1993; 2:00)
- Faded Roads (1994; 2:30)
- Nosehair (1994; 7:00)
- How to Make Love to a Woman (1995; 5:00)
- Smell the Flowers (1996; 2:00)
- Boney D (1996; 3:00)
- Plympmania (1996; 8:00)
- Sex & Violence (1997; 8:00)
- The Exciting Life of a Tree (1998; 7:00)
- More Sex & Violence (1998; 7;00)
- Surprise Cinema (1999; 7:00)
- The Exciting Life of a Tree (1999, 6:10) (presenter, animator)
- Can't Drag Race with Jesus (2000; 2:00)
- Eat (2001; 9:00)
- Parking (2002; 5:22)
- Guard Dog (2004; 5:00)
- The Fan and The Flower (2005; 7:10)
- Guide Dog (2006; 5:45) (sequel to Guard Dog)
- Shuteye Hotel (2007; 7:00)
- Gary Guitar (2008) (episode of Random! Cartoons)
- Hot Dog (2008) (third in the Guard Dog series)
- Santa: The Fascist Years (2009)
- Horn Dog (2009) (fourth in the Guard Dog series)
- The Cow Who Wanted to Be a Hamburger (2010)
- Summer Bummer (2011; 1:49)
- Waiting For Her Sailor (2011; 0:30)
- Tiffany the Whale: Death on the Runway (2012; 8:56)
- Drunker Than a Skunk (2013; 3:30)
- Footprints (2014; 4:01)
- The Prophet (segment, On Eating & Drinking) (2014)
- ABCs of Death 2 (segment-H is for Head Games) (2014)
- The Loneliest Stoplight (2015; 6:18)
- Cop Dog (2017) (fifth in the Guard Dog series)
- Demi’s Panic (2021)
- Duckville (2024)
- Whale 52 - Suite for Man, Boy and Whale (2025)

=== Animated TV shorts ===
- 12 Tiny Christmas Tales (2001)
- ChalkZone “That Thing You Drew”
- Random! Cartoons - Gary Guitar
- The Simpsons couch gags (2012–2022; Beware My Cheating Bart, Black Eyed, Please, Married to the Blob, Lisa the Veterinarian, 22 for 30, 3 Scenes Plus a Tag from a Marriage, Manger Things, One Angry Lisa)

=== Compilations (DVD) ===
- Avoid Eye Contact Vol. 1
- Avoid Eye Contact Vol. 2
- Plymptoons: The Complete Early Works of Bill Plympton (1992)
- Bill Plympton's Dirty Shorts (2006)
- Mondo Plympton (2007)
- Bill Plympton's Dog Days (2009)
- Bill Plympton's Dogs & Cows (2013)

=== Music videos ===
- Peter Himmelman – "245 Days" (1990)
- Kanye West – "Heard 'Em Say" (2005)
- "Weird Al" Yankovic – "Don't Download This Song" (2006)
- Parson Brown, "Mexican Standoff" (2008)
- "Weird Al" Yankovic – "TMZ" (2011)
- Cousin Joe Twoshacks (Joe Cartoon) - "Deep End" (2014)
- Matt Jaffe — Wicked World (2019)
- "Weird Al" Yankovic – "Polkamania" ("Shape of You" segment) (2024)
- Jon Bellion – "Rich and Broke" (2025)
- Wendy Maybury — The Vagina Song (2026)

=== Commercials ===
- MTV public service announcement "Acid Rain" (1989)
- Trivial Pursuit (3) (1990–91)
- Nutrasweet (1991)
- Soloflex "Transformation" (1992)
- Oregon Lottery "Blackjack" (1992)
- Taco Bell "Fuddy Duddy" (1993)
- Nik Naks (UK) (1993)
- Microsoft Windows '95 (1995)
- AirTouch Cellular (1996)
- AT&T "Longshot" (1996)
- AT&T Wireless "Map-O-Rama" (1997)
- NBC "Peacock Bumper" (1997)
- 7-11/PBS "Head" & "Explore" (1997)
- The Money Store "End of the World" & "Rollercoaster" (1998)
- Geico Direct (6) (1999)
- Wilson Tennis (3) (2002)
- United Airlines "Signature" (2005)
- Ford Motor Company (2016)
