= Awa Sène Sarr =

Senegalese actress and comedian

- Education: University of Dakar
- Occupation: Actress
- Years active: 1989-present
- Notable work: Kirikou and the Sorceress

Awa Sène Sarr is a Senegalese actress and comedian.

== Biography ==
Desiring to become a lawyer, Sarr studied law at the University of Dakar. She later enrolled in the National Institute of the Arts of Dakar in Senegal and graduated in 1980.

She has been a resident at the Daniel-Sorano National Theater in Dakar since 1980. Sarr has participated in several film festivals, including Cannes in 2005. In 2000, she played Mada in Ousmane Sembène's Faat Kiné.

Sarr has performed in over forty plays, including texts by Marie N'Diaye, Ahmadou Kourouma, Catherine Anne and Philippe Blasband. She organizes the Horlonge du Sud literary café every month in Brussels, intended to highlight African literature.

She hosted a radio program on Wolof language poetry entitled Taalifi Doomi Réewmi on the Radiodiffusion Télévision Sénégalaise (RTS).

Sarr has voiced Karaba the witch in Michel Ocelot's film trilogy Kirikou and the Sorceress (1998), Kirikou and the Wild Beasts (2005), and Kirikou and the Men and Women (2012). In the final film, she advised Ocelot to include a scene under a baobab tree in the village with a griot.

== Partial filmography ==
- 1989 : Dakar Clando
- 1989 : Le grotto de Sou Jacob
- 1997 : Une couleur café d'Henri Duparc
- 1998 : Kirikou and the Sorceress
- 2000 : Faat Kiné
- 2000 : Amul Yakaar
- 2000 : Battù
- 2001 : Karmen Geï
- 2005 : Kirikou and the Wild Beasts
- 2012 : Kirikou and the Men and Women
