= Mac Guff =

French visual effects company

- Industry: Visual effects Animation
- Founded: 1986; 40 years ago (as MGL Studio)
- Founders: Jacques Bled; Rodolphe Chabrier; Philippe Sonrier; Martial Vallanchon; Thierry Bravais
- Defunct: 2011; 15 years ago (animation studio)
- Successor: Illumination Studios Paris (animation department)
- Headquarters: Paris, France
- Products: Animated films
- Website: macguff.com

Mac Guff (also known as Mac Guff Ligne) is a French visual effects company based in Los Angeles, United States, Brussels, Belgium and Paris, France, where it is headquartered. Mac Guff specializes in the creation of computer graphics for commercials, music videos, television series, and feature films. 270 graphic designers, VFX supervisors and producers, computer engineers, and administrators are usually working on over 100 million files (for Despicable Me). In mid-2011, the company was split in two, and the animation department was acquired by Illumination Entertainment (Universal Studios). The new company was named Illumination Mac Guff (now known as Illumination Studios Paris) and has capital worth 3.2 million euro.

== Company name ==
The company name Mac Guff was inspired by the term MacGuffin. The director and producer Alfred Hitchcock popularized both the term "MacGuffin" and the technique.

== Animated productions ==
- La Vie des bêtes (1988, design. Philippe Starck)
- "Love Don't Let Me Go" (2002, music video for David Guetta dir. Olivier Boscovitch)
- Pat & Stan (2004–2010, television series dir. Pierre Coffin)
- Azur & Asmar: The Princes' Quest (2006, feature film dir. Michel Ocelot)
- Dragon Hunters (2008, feature film dir. Arthur Qwak and Guillaume Ivernel)
- Despicable Me (2010, feature film dir. Pierre Coffin and Chris Renaud)
- Home Makeover, Orientation Day, and Banana (2010, short films)
- Hop (2011, feature film dir. Tim Hill, Illumination opening logo variant only)
- Brad & Gary (2011, short film)
- A Monster in Paris (2011, feature film dir. Bibo Bergeron)
- The Lorax (2012, feature film dir. Chris Renaud)
- Kirikou and the Men and Women (2012, feature film dir. Michel Ocelot)
- Life, Animated (2016, feature film dir. Roger Ross Williams, animated sequences only)
- Dilili in Paris (2018, feature film dir. Michel Ocelot)
- SamSam (2020, feature film dir. Tanguy de Kermel)
- Around the World in 80 Days (2021, feature film dir. Samuel Tourneux)
- Night of the Zoopocalypse (2024, feature film dir. Rodrigo Perez-Castro and Ricardo Curtis)

== Features ==
- 1995: La Haine
- 1997: Dobermann
- 1997: Contact
- 1998: Quasimodo d'El Paris
- 1998: The Visitors II: The Corridors of Time
- 1999: Train de vie
- 2000: Cours toujours
- 2000: Scènes de crimes
- 2001: Vidocq
- 2001: Safe Conduct
- 2001: G@mer
- 2001: Snowboarder
- 2001: Le Petit Poucet
- 2002: Monsieur Batignole
- 2002: Irréversible
- 2002: Brocéliande
- 2002: Filles perdues, cheveux gras
- 2002: Ginostra
- 2002: Quelqu'un de bien
- 2003: Love Me If You Dare
- 2003: Blueberry
- 2003: A Species Odyssey (TV)
- 2004: L'Américain
- 2004: L'Équipier
- 2004: Agents secrets
- 2004: Arsène Lupin
- 2005: La Boîte noire
- 2005: Ma vie en l'air
- 2005: Danny the Dog
- 2005: Joyeux Noël
- 2005: Homo sapiens (TV)
- 2006: Bandidas
- 2006: Azur et Asmar
- 2006: Tell No One
- 2007: Truands
- 2007: La Tête de maman
- 2007: 3 Amis
- 2007: L'Invité
- 2007: 99 francs
- 2007: Les Femmes de l'ombre
- 2008: Dragon Hunters
- 2008: Un conte de Noël
- 2008: The First Day of the Rest of Your Life
- 2008: Comme les autres
- 2008: Mes stars et moi
- 2008: Transporter 3
- 2008: Largo Winch
- 2009: Welcome
- 2009: Coco
- 2009: Un prophète
- 2009: Park Benches
- 2009: Happy End
- 2009: L'affaire Farewell
- 2009: Le Petit Nicolas
- 2009: Une affaire d'État
- 2009: 22 Bullets
- 2009: Coco and Igor
- 2009: Splice
- 2010: With Love... from the Age of Reason
- 2010: Sarah's Key
- 2010: Despicable Me
- 2011: Hop (Illumination opening logo variant only)
- 2011: A Monster in Paris
- 2012: The Lorax
- 2012: The Gatekeepers
- 2012: Taken 2
- 2014: Brick Mansions
- 2014: 3 Days to Kill
- 2015: The Transporter Refueled
- 2015: Taken 3
- 2016: Life, Animated
- 2017: Valerian and the City of a Thousand Planets
