= Lumière Award for Best Animated Film =

Annual French film award

- Country: France
- Presented by: Académie des Lumières
- First award: 2017
- Currently held by: Arco (2026)
- Website: academiedeslumieres.com

The Lumière Award for Best Animated Film (French: Lumière du meilleur film d'animation) is an award presented annually by the Académie des Lumières since 2017 to honour the year's best animated feature film.

== Winners and nominees ==
In the following lists, the titles and names with a blue background are the winners and recipients respectively; those not in bold are the nominees.

=== 2010s ===
Year	English title	Original title	Director (s)	Ref
2017 (22nd)	**My Life as a Courgette**	**Ma vie de Courgette**	**Claude Barras**	
2017 (22nd)	The Girl Without Hands	La Jeune Fille sans mains	Sébastien Laudenbach	
2017 (22nd)	Long Way North	Tout en haut du monde	Rémi Chayé	
2017 (22nd)	Louise by the Shore	Louise en hiver	Jean-François Laguionie	
2017 (22nd)	The Red Turtle	La Tortue rouge	Michaël Dudok de Wit	
2018 (23rd)	**The Big Bad Fox and Other Tales...**	**Le Grand Méchant Renard et autres contes...**	**Benjamin Renner, Patrick Imbert**	
2018 (23rd)	Tall Tales from the Magical Garden of Antoon Krings	Drôles de petites bêtes	Antoon Krings, Arnaud Bouron	
2018 (23rd)	Zombillenium	Zombillénium	Arthur de Pins, Alexis Ducord	
2019 (24th)	**Dilili in Paris**	**Dilili à Paris**	**Michel Ocelot**	
2019 (24th)	Asterix: The Secret of the Magic Potion	Astérix: Le Secret de la potion magique	Louis Clichy, Alexandre Astier	
2019 (24th)	Mutafukaz		Shojiro Nishimi, Run	
2019 (24th)	Pachamama		Juan Antín	

=== 2020s ===
Year	English title	Original title	Director (s)	Ref
2020 (25th)	**I Lost My Body**	**J'ai perdu mon corps**	**Jérémy Clapin**	
2020 (25th)	The Bears' Famous Invasion of Sicily	La Fameuse Invasion des ours en Sicile	Lorenzo Mattotti	
2020 (25th)	Funan		Denis Do	
2020 (25th)	The Swallows of Kabul	Les Hirondelles de Kaboul	Zabou Breitman, Eléa Gobé Mévellec	
2020 (25th)	Wardi		Mats Grorud	
2021 (26th)	**Josep**		**Aurel**	
2021 (26th)	Calamity, a Childhood of Martha Jane Cannary	Calamity, une enfance de Martha Jane Cannary	Rémi Chayé	
2021 (26th)	Little Vampire	Petit Vampire	Joann Sfar	
2021 (26th)	Marona's Fantastic Tale	L'Extraordinaire Voyage de Marona	Anca Damian	
2022 (27th)	**The Summit of the Gods**	**Le Sommet des dieux**	**Patrick Imbert**	
2022 (27th)	Around the World in 80 Days	Le Tour du monde en quatre-vingts jours	Samuel Tourneux	
2022 (27th)	The Crossing	La Traversée	Florence Miailhe	
2022 (27th)	Pil's Adventures	Pil	Julien Fournet	
2022 (27th)	Princess Dragon	Princesse Dragon	Anthony Roux, Jean-Jacques Denis	
2023 (28th)	**Little Nicholas: Happy as Can Be**	**Le Petit Nicolas : Qu'est-ce qu'on attend pour être heureux ?**	**Amandine Fredon, Benjamin Massoubre**	
2023 (28th)	The Black Pharaoh, the Savage and the Princess	Le Pharaon, le Sauvage et la Princesse	Michel Ocelot	
2023 (28th)	Ernest & Celestine: A Trip to Gibberitia	Ernest et Célestine: Le Voyage en Charabie	Julien Chheng, Jean-Christophe Roger	
2023 (28th)	My Father's Secrets	Les Secrets de mon père	Véra Belmont	
2023 (28th)	My Neighbours of My Neighbours Are My Neighbours	Les voisins de mes voisins sont mes voisins	Anne-Laure Daffis, Léo Marchand	
2024 (29th)	**Chicken for Linda!**	**Linda veut du poulet !**	**Chiara Malta, Sébastien Laudenbach**	
2024 (29th)	Blind Willow, Sleeping Woman	Saules aveugles, femme endormie	Pierre Földes	
2024 (29th)	Mars Express		Jérémie Périn	
2024 (29th)	No Dogs or Italians Allowed	Interdit aux chiens et aux Italiens	Alain Ughetto	
2024 (29th)	The Siren	La Sirène	Sepideh Farsi	
2025 (30th)	**Flow**	**Straume**	**Gints Zilbalodis**	
2025 (30th)	Into the Wonderwoods	Angelo dans la forêt mystérieuse	Vincent Paronnaud and Alexis Ducord	
2025 (30th)	Maya, Give Me a Title	Maya, donne-moi un titre	Michel Gondry	
2025 (30th)	The Most Precious of Cargoes	La Plus Précieuse des marchandises	Michel Hazanavicius	
2025 (30th)	Savages	Sauvages	Claude Barras	
2026 (31st)	**Arco**		**Ugo Bienvenu**	
2026 (31st)	A Magnificent Life	Marcel et Monsieur Pagnol	Sylvain Chomet	
2026 (31st)	A Boat In The Garden	Slocum et moi	Jean-François Laguionie	
2026 (31st)	Little Amélie or the Character of Rain	Amélie et la métaphysique des tubes	Maïlys Vallade and Liane-Cho Han	
2026 (31st)	My Life In Versailles	La Vie de château : Mon enfance à Versailles	Nathaniel H’Limi and Clémence Madeleine-Perdrillat	

== See also ==
- Academy Award for Best Animated Feature
