= The Black Pharaoh, the Savage and the Princess =

- French theatrical release poster
- Le Pharaon, le Sauvage et la Princesse
- Directed by: Michel Ocelot
- Screenplay by: Michel Ocelot
- Story by: Michel Ocelot; Henri Pourrat
- Based on: Le Pharaon, le Sauvage et la Princesse, Henri Pourrat
- Produced by: Philip Boëffard; Christophe Rossignon; Dany Boon; Patrick Quinet; Pierre Guyard; Ève François Machuel
- Narrated by: Aïssa Maïga
- Cinematography: Valentin Durning; Géraldine Rétif
- Music by: Pascal Le Pennec
- Animation by: Nicolas Sainte-Rose; Léo Silly Pélissier
- Backgrounds by: Thierry Buron
- Color process: Color
- Production companies: Nord-Ouest Films; Studio O; Les Productions du Ch'Timi; Louvre Museum; Artemis Productions
- Release dates: June 14, 2022 (premier); October 19, 2022 (France)
- Running time: 83 min.
- Countries: France; Belgium
- Language: French
- Budget: €3.7 million

The Black Pharaoh, the Savage and the Princess (French: Le Pharaon, le Sauvage et la Princesse) is a 2022 French-Belgian animated film written and directed by Michel Ocelot.

== Synopsis ==
The film features a frame structure in which a narrator tells her audience three stories: one set in ancient Egypt, one in medieval Auvergne, and one in the 18th-century Middle East.

=== The Black Pharaoh ===
In Kush, the princess Nasalsa and the prince Tanouékamani cannot marry because of her mother, who will only allow the Pharaoh of Egypt to marry her daughter. The young prince thus conquers Egypt in order to marry his beloved, not by force but by wisdom and the help of the gods. Finally, he returns to Kush and this time he can marry Nasalsa, who become Queen of Egypt.

=== The Savage ===
In medieval Auvergne, the son of a tyrannical Lord befriends a prisoner, whom he then helps escape. The father then sentences him to death, but the executioner allows him to escape into the woods, where the boy becomes an outlaw who incites the people to rebel against the tyrant. Eventually, the tyrant is defeated by a rival Lord, who turns out to be the escaped prisoner, and who thanks the boy by giving him his daughter in marriage.

=== The Princess ===
In 18th-century Turkey, a prince escapes assassins and becomes a donut vendor in a new town, where he meets and falls in love with the local princess. Discovered by her father, the two are locked up, but manage to escape and live a series of adventures that leave them rich, happy, and together.

== Cast ==
- Aïssa Maïga: narrator

=== The Pharaoh ===
- Oscar Lesage: Tanouékamani (Tanwetamani)
- Claire de la Rüe du Can: Nasalsa
- Olivier Claverie: Vizir
- Didier Sandre: Amun
- Bruno Paviot: Osiris
- Thissa d'Avila Bensalah: Isis
- Annie Mercier: Nasalsa's mother
- Isabelle Guiard: Sekhmet
- Michel Elias: Khnum

=== The Savage ===
- Patrick Rocca: the Lord
- Gaël Raës: the baby boy
- Oscar Lesage: the Savage
- Didier Sandre: the Duke
- Serge Bagdassarian: the provost
- Olivier Claverie: the superintendent
- Michel Elias: the monk

=== The Princess ===
- Claire de la Rüe du Can: the Princess
- Oscar Lesage: the Prince
- Bruno Paviot: the Merchant
- Annie Mercier, Isabelle Guiard, Thissa d'Avila Bensalah: the Dames
- Nicolas Planchais: the bandits leader
- Isabelle Guiard: Madame
- Olivier Claverie: The Sultan
- Serge Bagdassarian: the Visir

== Genre and themes ==
The three stories, told in the manner of fantastical French contes, revolve around emancipation, youthful rebellion, various forms of parental abuse, and star-crossed lovers, framed within the nobility, themes which run through Ocelot's earlier works, but intentionally simpler than those.

== Production ==
Made for about 3.7 million euros, the film was produced in collaboration with the Louvre Museum, its first animated co-production, in adapting the story of Tantamani's conquest of Egypt. The second tale is an adaptation of Henri Pourrat's Le conte du beau sauvage.

== Release ==
The film premiered at the 46th Annecy International Animation Film Festival on June 14, 2022, prior to its generasl release in France on October 19, 2022.

Within days of the Annecy premiere, Playtime distribution rights had been acquired for Italy (Movies Inspired), Canada (Axia), the former Yugoslavia (MCF) and Portugal (Leopardo).

== Accolades ==
- 2022 - Seville European Film Festival
  - Candidature for the Golden Giraldillo
- 2023 - Lumière Awards
  - Candidature for the Lumière Award for Best Animated Film
