= Kirikou and the Sorceress =

1998 animated film by Michel Ocelot

- Original French film poster
- Directed by: Michel Ocelot
- Written by: Michel Ocelot
- Produced by: Didier Brunner
- Starring: Doudou Gueye Thiaw; Maimouna N'Diaye; Awa Sène Sarr
- Edited by: Dominique Lefevre
- Music by: Youssou N'Dour
- Production companies: France 3 Cinéma; Les Armateurs; Monipoly Productions; Odec Kid Cartoons; Rija Studio; Studio O; Trans Europe Film
- Distributed by: Gébéka Films
- Release date: 9 December 1998
- Running time: 71 minutes
- Countries: France; Belgium; Luxembourg
- Language: French
- Budget: €3,800,000

Kirikou and the Sorceress (French: Kirikou et la Sorcière, pronounced [kiʁiku e la sɔʁsjɛʁ]) is a 1998 French-language animated adventure fantasy film written and directed by Michel Ocelot. Drawn from elements of West African folk tales, it depicts how a newborn boy, Kirikou, saves his village from the evil witch Karaba. The film was originally released on 9 December 1998. It is a co-production between companies in France (Exposure, France 3 Cinéma, Les Armateurs, Monipoly, Odec Kid Cartoons), Belgium (Radio-Télévision Belge) and Luxembourg (Studio O, Trans Europe Film) and animated at Rija Films' studio in Latvia and Studio Exist in Hungary.

Kirikou and the Sorceress was a major commercial and critical success in France, becoming a modern classic of French animation. Its success led to a sequel, Kirikou et les bêtes sauvages, released in 2005, and a stage musical adaptation, Kirikou et Karaba, first performed in 2007. Another follow-up, Kirikou et les hommes et les femmes, was released in late 2012.

== Plot ==
In a little West African village, an unusual boy named Kirikou is born, who can speak before birth and walk immediately after birth. After Kirikou's mother tells him that an evil sorceress, Karaba, has dried up their spring and eaten all the men of the village except for one, he decides to accompany the last warrior, his uncle, to visit her and try to stop her.

Kirikou manages to trick the sorceress and save his uncle by waiting inside his uncle's hat and pretending that it is magic. Additionally, he saves the village's children from being kidnapped both by the sorceress's boat and tree, and kills the monster who was drinking all the village's water, gaining trust and stature in the eyes of the previously skeptical villagers. With the help of his mother and various animals, Kirikou then evades Karaba's watchmen and travels into a forbidden mountain to ask his wise old grandfather about the sorceress.

His grandfather tells him that she is evil because she suffers from a poisoned thorn in her back, which causes her great pain and also gives her great power. After learning this, Kirikou manages to take the sorceress's stolen gold, thus luring her outside to where he can trick her and extract the poisoned thorn. As a result, the sorceress is cured of her suffering, and she kisses Kirikou, who then becomes an adult.

When Kirikou and Karaba arrive back at the village, no one believes that the sorceress is cured until a procession of drummers arrive with Kirikou's grandfather. The drummers turn out to be the sorceress's watchmen and henchmen restored to their original human forms, the missing men of the village, whom she hadn't eaten after all.

== Cast ==
=== French voice cast ===
- Doudou Gueye Thiaw: Child Kirikou
- Awa Sene Sarr: Karaba
- Maimouna N'Diaye: Kirikou's mother
- Robert Liensol: Kirikou's grandfather
- William Nadylam: Adult Kirikou
- Sébastien Hébrant: Adult Kirikou
- Rémi Bichet: Adult Kirikou
- Thilombo Lubambu: Kirikou's uncle
- Marie Augustine Diatta: the force woman
- Moustafa Diop: the fetish on the roof
- Isseu Niang: the small woman
- Selly Raby Kane: Zoé, the big girl
- Erick Patrick Correa: Boris, the big boy
- Adjoua Barry: Boulette, a girl
- Charles Edouard Gomis Correa: a boy
- Marie-Louise Shedeye Diiddi: the little girl
- Abdoulayé Diop Yama: the old person
- Josephine Theodora M'Boup: a woman
- Tabata N'Diaye: the old woman
- Samba Wane: fetish talked
- Aminatha N'Diaye: a mother
- François Chicaïa: man of the village
- N'Deyé Aïta N'Diaye: woman of the village
- Abdou El Aziz Gueye: man of the village
- Boury Kandé: woman of the village
- Assy Dieng Bâ: Karaba's scream
- Michel Elias: animal sounds

=== English voice cast ===
- Theodore Sibusiso Sibeko: Kirikou
- Antoinette Kellermann: Karaba
- Fezile Mpela: Uncle
- Kombisile Sangweni: The Mother
- Mabutho Kid Sithole: The Old Man

=== Swahili voice cast ===
- Samson Komeka: Kirikou

=== Japanese voice cast ===
- Ryūnosuke Kamiki: Kirikou
- Atsuko Asano: Karaba
- Kaori Yamagata: Mother

=== Brazilian voice cast ===
- Thiago Keplmair: Kirikou
- Sérgio Moreno: Adult Kirikou
- Lúcia Helena: Karaba
- Wendel Bezerra: the fetish on the roof
- Rosa Maria Baroli: Mother
- Marcelo Pissardini: Uncle
- João Ângelo: Grandfather
- Eleu Salvador: The Old Man
- Tatiane Keplmair as Zoé, the big girl
- Fábio Lucindo: Boris, the big boy
- Rosana Beltrame: the force woman
- Thelma Lúcia: the old woman

== Production ==
The film was a co-production of Les Armateurs, Trans Europe Film, Studio O, France 3 cinéma, RTBF and Exposure in France, Odec Kid Cartoons in Belgium and Monipoly in Luxembourg. It was animated at Rija Films' animation studio in Latvia and Studio Exist in Hungary, with backgrounds painted at Les Armateurs and Paul Thiltges' animation studio, Tiramisu, in Luxembourg, digital ink and paint and compositing by Les Armateurs and Odec Kid Cartoons in Belgium and voices and music recorded in Senegal.

The original French voice acting was performed by a cast of West African actors and schoolchildren and recorded in Dakar. The English dubbing, also directed by Ocelot, was made in South Africa. A dub of the film in the Swahili language was produced in Tanzania in 2009 through the help of the Danish Film Institute (DFI) and John Riber of Media for Development in Dar es Salaam.

=== Financing ===
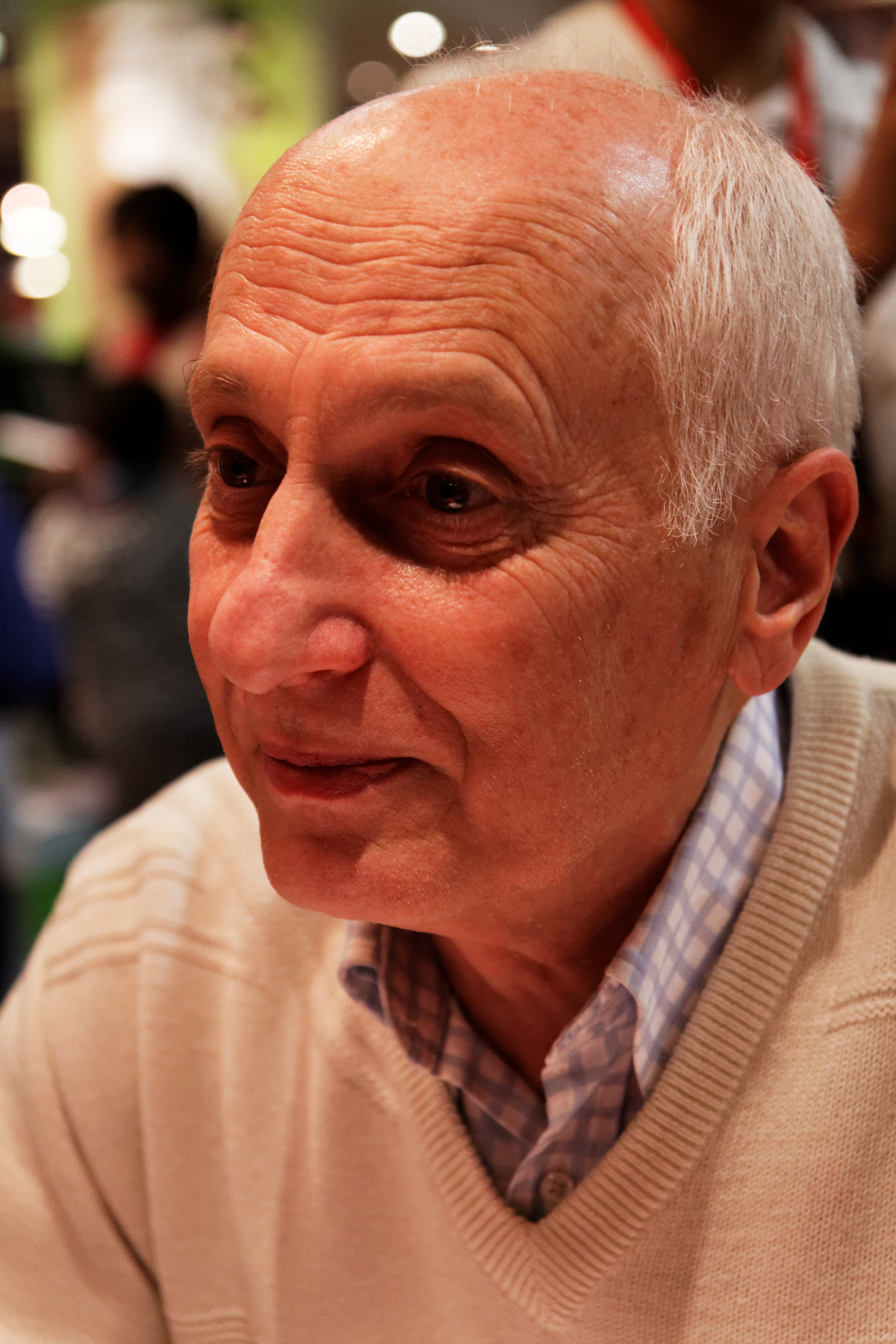
Michel Ocelot, director of Kirikou and the Sorceress (here in Montreuil in 2012).

Kirikou and the Sorceress was a low-budget film: one of the producers, Didier Brunner, explains this by the fact that the film was seen as an art/experimental project in the eyes of investors, as opposed to other more commercial projects (such as A Monkey's Tale by Jean-François Laguionie, which was closer to mainstream animated films like Disney). The planned budget, although small, was still not easy to raise, and the process of gathering it took time. The first funds assembled were an advance on receipts from the National Center of Cinematography of 2.2 million francs, and a participation from the Canal+ channel amounted to 3.5 million francs; the rest of the budget was raised internationally, which resulted in the production being scattered across several countries (as is more common for television series), complicating its creation further. The film greatly benefited from grants from several institutions: the CNC, the Eurimages Fund from the Council of Europe, the EU Media Programme, the Cinema and Audiovisual Center of the French Community of Belgium, the Agency for Cultural and Technical Cooperation, the International Fund for the Support of Audiovisual Production from Luxembourg, and Procirep.

Two years were needed to gather sufficient financial support for the film, and four years were needed for its actual production. The final budget of the film amounted to a total of 25 million francs at the time, or 3.8 million euros.

=== Screenplay ===
Michel Ocelot wrote the screenplay, although it was loosely inspired by African folktales. He found the initial idea in a collection of popular traditional stories from West Africa, compiled by Equilbecq, an administrator from the French Colonies, in 1912. In one of the tales, a child speaks while still inside his mother's belly and demands to be born; she responds calmly, and the child is then born by himself and, afterwards, washes himself, and immediately goes to confront a sorceress who threatens the village. This prodigious child who inspired Kirikou is Izé Gani, made famous by the version given by Boubou Hama. Michel Ocelot retained the beginning of the tale largely untouched, but made many modifications to the rest of the story, so that the final screenplay was largely his own, if influenced, invention. In the original tale, the child had just as many powers as the sorceress, whom he ultimately killed outright; additionally, here was no further mention of his mother after his birth. In the animated film, however, Kirikou questions more and heals the sorceress instead of killing her; the sorceress was described as very powerful (she was said to have devoured all of the warriors of the village and dried up their single spring), and Kirikou's mother retained a role after the hero's birth. Some narrative techniques, however, that Ocelot borrow devices from Western tales, including the aggression of Karaba by men and the thorn that gives her magical powers form another unique element of the film's screenplay; likewise, the singular kiss that transformed Kirikou into an adult at the end of the story, which Ocelot borrowed from narrative techniques in Western tales. The names "Kirikou" and "Karaba" are also Ocelot's inventions and do not have any particular meaning; however, the name Karaba can be related to the fairy Carabosse. Ocelot insists that Kirikou, unlike the sorceress, has no special powers or magical talisman. The story is established in a week, followed by many rereadings.

=== Graphic design ===
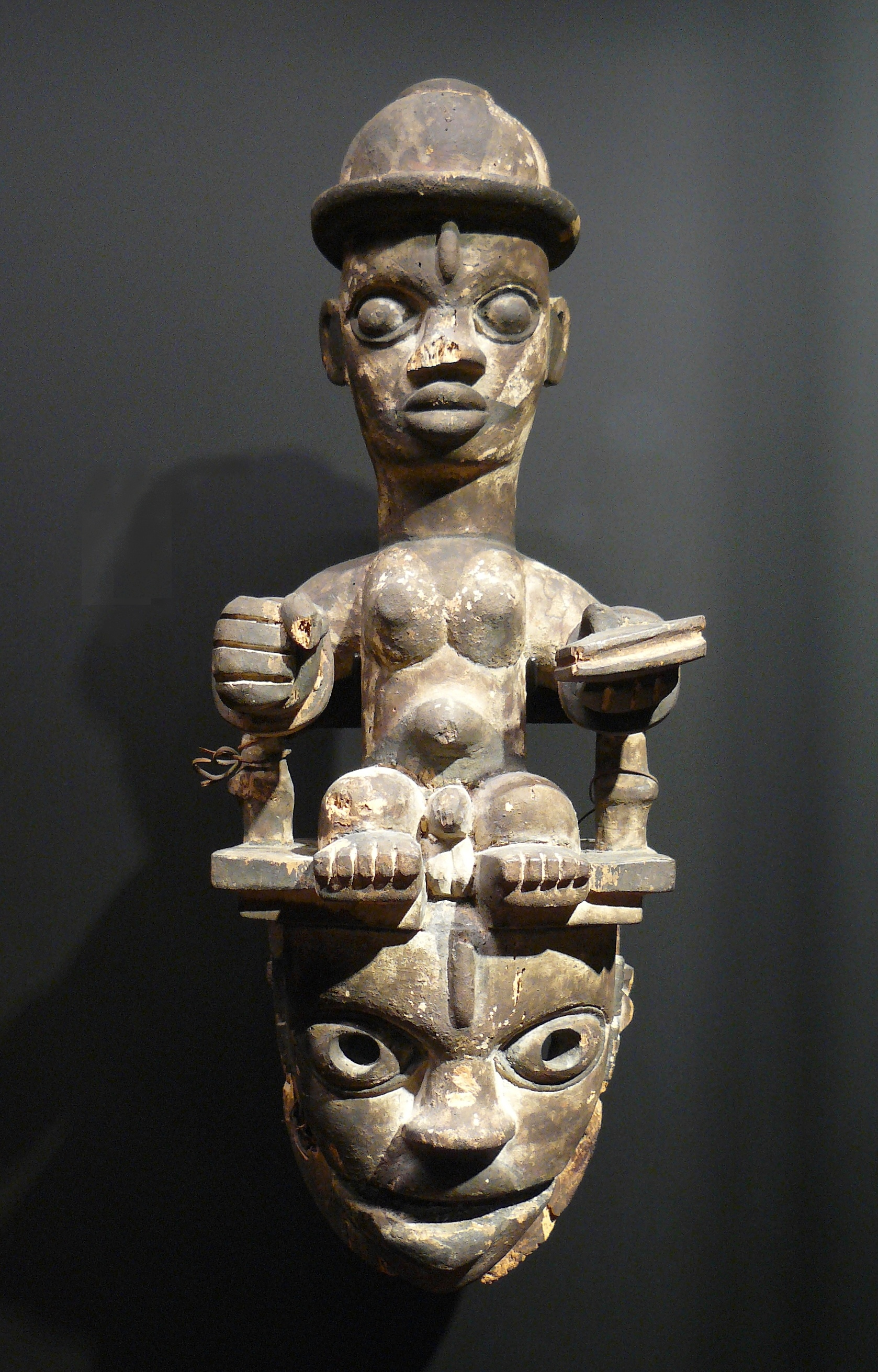
Ogoni wooden mask from the ~~20~~ (Musée du quai Branly, Paris).

Michel Ocelot dedicates several months to the visual design of characters and key sets. The graphic representation of Africa poses a problem, as African arts have a rich decorative tradition but rather few figurative graphic arts; Michel Ocelot draws inspiration from the paintings of Henri Rousseau to design the visual universe of the film, and from ancient Egyptian art for the appearance of the characters.

For the characters, Michel Ocelot starts by making sketches and outlines, aided by photographs, then simplifies and adapts the lines to arrive at well-defined models that meet the technical constraints of animation. A first version of the project used almost entirely black silhouettes moving over colored backgrounds, in a style close to shadow theater, similar to the short films previously made by Ocelot (including those later grouped in Princes and Princesses in 2000); but Ocelot has to abandon these initial visuals, as his advisors fear they won't be able to convince investors, and thus he develops a new project using colored line drawings, more akin to conventional animated films.

However, some elements of this first version remain in the follow-up, such as the general appearance of the sorceress Karaba, whose numerous jewels around her neck, arms, and chest make her gestures more legible in the shadow version. These many adornments, as well as Karaba's complex hairstyle, make her harder to animate later, but they are retained as she is a central character in the story. The other characters undergo numerous tweaks due to animation constraints: for instance, a rounded braid on Kirikou's mother's forehead is removed, and the grandfather's headdress must be simplified. The grandfather's final headdress, reminiscent of those worn by pharaohs of ancient Egypt, is actually inspired by a bronze from Benin dating back to the 16th century; likewise, Ocelot draws on statues from Sub-Saharan Africa and photographs of elderly men for the particular arrangement of his goatee.

For the animated fetishes that are under the command of the sorceress Karaba, Michel Ocelot draws inspiration from fetishes of traditional African art, borrowing from several styles and adding an aggressiveness unique to the servants of an evil sorceress. For example, the appearance of the "fetching fetish" (responsible for bringing objects to Karaba) is inspired by the Mumuye style, while the "speaking fetish" (the sorceress's spokesperson) draws from the Ogoni style, while others, like the "sniffing fetish", are pure visual inventions.

The settings are designed jointly by Michel Ocelot and Anne-Lise Koehler, followed by Thierry Million. Michel Ocelot's guidelines concerning the representation of vegetation are to combine botanical accuracy, which requires great attention to detail, with stylization inspired by Egyptian art and colors adapted from the paintings of Henri Rousseau.

=== Sound design ===
==== Voices ====
To complement the African identity of the film, the French voices are provided by Senegalese actors, and the English dubbing is done by black South Africans. The other voiceovers, however, do not carry any particular accent, as Ocelot wishes to limit the African accent to the Western languages actually spoken in Africa (i.e., French and English) without attempting to mimic an African accent in others.

The film's voices are recorded in Senegal, in Dakar. Ocelot and his team audition actors and schoolchildren. For the voice of the child Kirikou, Ocelot chooses Doudou Gueye Thiaw, whose accent is not deemed very pronounced but proves to be the best voice actor. The English dubbing is recorded in South Africa, also under the direction of Michel Ocelot.

==== Music ====
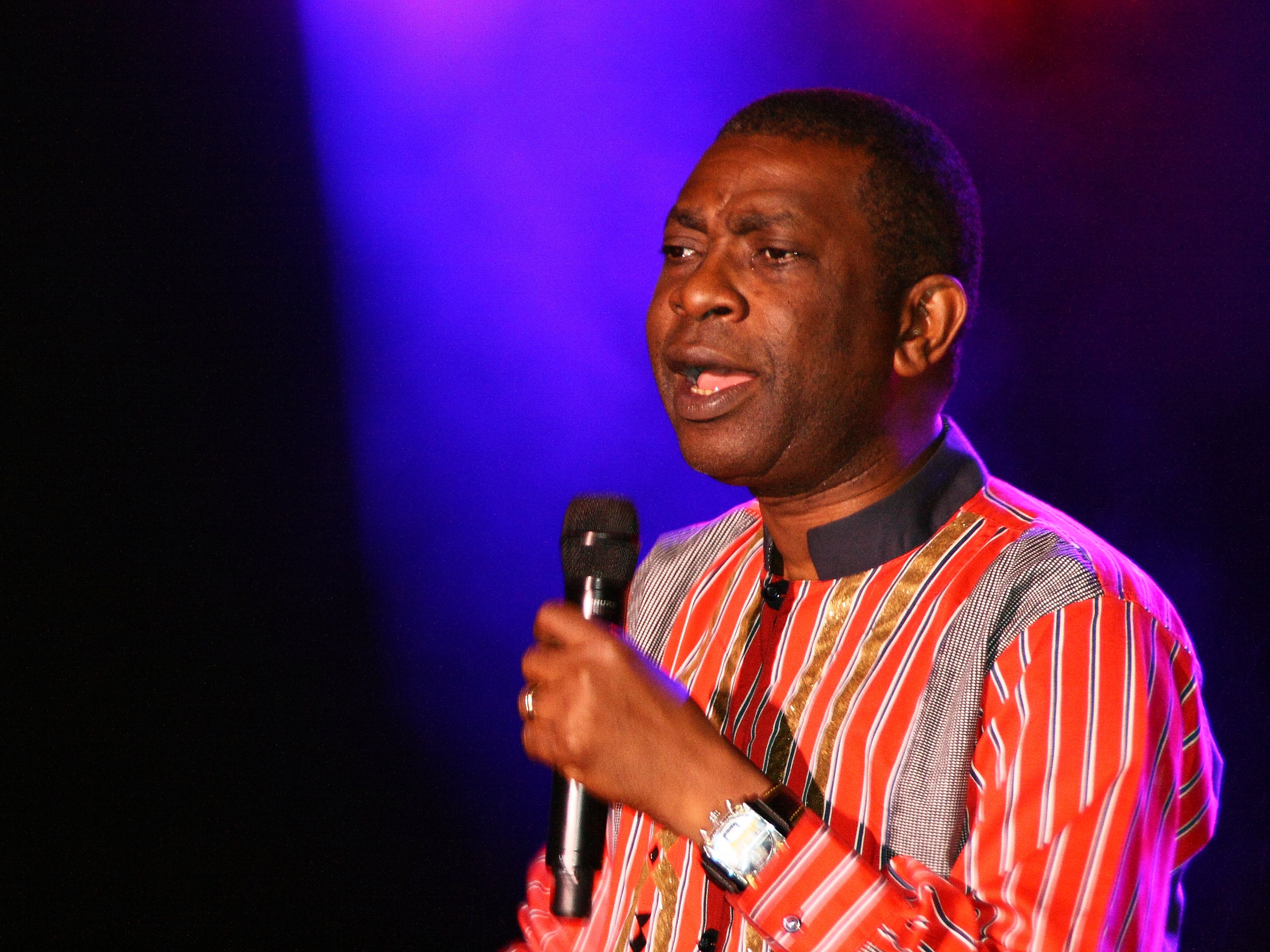
Youssou N'Dour (here in 2011), composes the music for the film.

The music is also recorded in Africa. The film's crew sends the script of Kirikou to Senegalese singer Youssou N'Dour, who agrees to compose the film's music. Michel Ocelot imposes several constraints: the use of the same actors for both dialogue and sung parts, the use of traditional African instruments, and the restriction of drums (traditional men's instruments) to the very last scenes of the film, since the men of Kirikou's village, abducted by Karaba, remain absent until the conclusion. The film's original soundtrack uses instruments such as the kora (for the birth sequence), the tokoro flute (for the scene where Kirikou ventures into a zorilla's burrow), the balafon, and the sanza (for the spring scene).

Youssou N'Dour also composes the end credits song, with lyrics in Wolof, the main language spoken in Senegal. Initially, it was agreed that Youssou N'Dour would perform the song himself, and the recording did indeed take place in Dakar; but Youssou N'Dour's label, Sony, later forbids its use, claiming it would harm the singer's albums. It is ultimately Mendy Boubacar, another singer living in Dakar, who performs the song in the film.

=== Manufacturing ===
The film's production is scattered among six studios located in five countries: Paris, Riga, Budapest, Brussels, Angoulême, and Dakar. Michel Ocelot is constantly moving between the different studios to guide the teams and ensure the project's coherence. In his book All About Kirikou published in 2003, he recalls the tumultuous production marked by tensions between the eight co-producers of the film, whose collaboration was originally due to financial constraints rather than a common artistic project. Ocelot's workload is further increased by the fact that he is managing the production of Kirikou and his role as president of the International Animation Film Association.

==== Storyboard and setup ====
Michel Ocelot himself creates an initial storyboard that the producers find too inadequate; a second one is commissioned from professionals but is, conversely, too far removed from Ocelot's vision of his story, and unfeasible due to shadow and perspective effects incompatible with the project's financial constraints; ultimately, it is Ocelot's storyboard that is used.

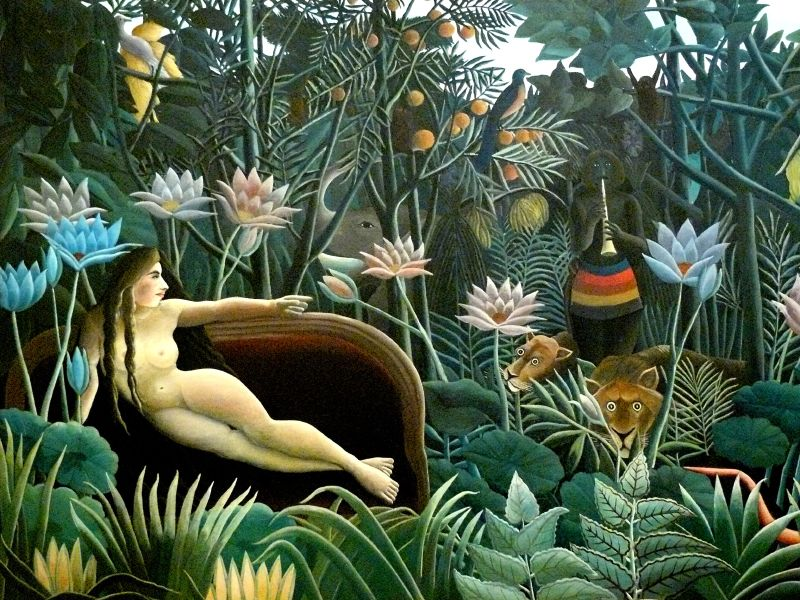
The Dream, painting by Henri Rousseau (1910) which inspired the visual universe of Kirikou.

The storyboard serves as the basis for the team responsible for setting up the film. The setup consists of preparing the work for the 1,200 shots of Kirikou, providing the animators with all the necessary elements for executing the animation. Each shot, numbered, is the subject of a complete preparatory file, which mainly includes sound detection guidelines (which allow animators to animate the characters according to the pre-recorded dialogues), drawings of the set elements, the framing in which the animation will later be drawn, precise indications of camera movements, a frame-by-frame shooting sheet, and scaled drawings of the characters as they will later be executed by the animators, along with all indications about their expressions, attitudes, and gestures during the scene, their respective sizes, their distances from each other, etc. The setup team also ensures consistency among the shots of the film. This team works in Angoulême, then in Paris; it includes several artists who create multiple drawings of sets, props, and secondary characters.

Based on his research, Michel Ocelot creates rotation models for the main characters, which are drawings showing each character from the front, back, profile, and three-quarter views, indicating how to draw their different expressions and key gestures, etc., to serve as reference models for the various animation teams. Eric Serre draws the models of secondary characters and most animals. Anne-Lise Koehler draws the models of birds. The setup team (Eric Serre, Christophe Lourdelet, Bénédicte Galup, Anne-Lise Koehler, Stéfane Sichère, Pascal Lemaire, etc.) is responsible for creating the models of the various objects and props that appear in the film. As often happens in animation, artists sometimes use improvised live models (themselves or their colleagues) to accurately draw gestures and expressions. The models are created at multiple scales (full size, half size, etc.) with varying levels of detail depending on whether they are intended for wide shots or close-ups; all drawings included in the files for a given scene are to the same scale to avoid size inconsistencies during the animation.

The film's sets are first drawn in outline based on the still very general indications of the storyboard, then colored by the colorists, sometimes by hand (in watercolor or gouache), and sometimes using computer tools. Complex sets (like forests) are created using a series of individually drawn elements that are then assembled to form the final backdrop.

==== Animation ====
The actual animation of Kirikou takes place in two studios in Eastern Europe: Exist Studio in Budapest, Hungary, and Rija Studio based in Riga, Latvia. Exist Studio's work poses a problem in the early days, as the team is accustomed to small TV orders and is poorly paid; but they do produce some animations integrated into the film. In fact, the payment for the work they provide for Kirikou also poses a problem, as the company responsible for paying the team goes bankrupt during production, having kept its financial situation secret: the team is ultimately paid, albeit late. The majority of the animation is carried out by the animators from the Riga studio; Michel Ocelot spends a week each month in Riga for checking and corrections. The drawings are done by hand, often starting with a blue pencil sketch, followed by a strict final clear line that facilitates animation and coloring. The drawings are then scanned, and the animation is tested on a computer in a low-definition render, which allows for adjustments in the placements of the different elements of a scene and the durations of the animations. The film contains no elements modeled in CGI, only flat drawings arranged in layers.

Once the drawings are made, they are checked and retouched if necessary to refine the animation. In addition to studio verifiers, Michel Ocelot conducts an initial check of the drawings in Riga, then the general verification team takes over in France.

==== Computer shooting and post-production ====
The computer shooting of the film takes place in two studios: Les Armateurs, in Angoulême, France, and Odec Kid Cartoons, in Brussels, Belgium. The computer shooting consists of assembling on the computer all the completed elements of the film (sets, characters, props, etc.) while completing any omissions, managing movements of multipane cameras, and adding special effects, to produce the final images of the feature film as they will be projected in theaters. Each frame consists of numerous elements: several layers of backgrounds, varying numbers of props and characters, the characters themselves being composed of multiple levels of drawings.

The film's final phase is post-production, during which the video editing of the image and sound is performed, with the addition of various sound tracks (dialogues, music, ambiance, and sound effects) and their mixing.

The Brussels animation studio Odec Kid Cartoons handles just over half of the computer treatment of Kirikou, along with post-production, editing, and sound mixing.

=== Distribution ===
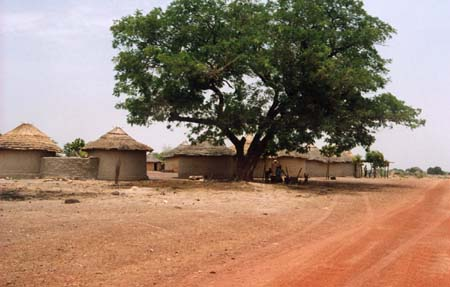
Siguiri, Guinea village, whose architecture is similar to that of Kirikou's village.

During production, European and American distributors are convinced that the film will not sell well. The film's producer, Didier Brunner, mentions in 2007 the concerns of commercial advisors at the time:

Perfectly well-intentioned advisors warned me: this project is impossible to animate and it's also impossible to market, it only shows Africans too. Partners were uncomfortable with the issue of nudity. But I have always been convinced it would be a beautiful film.

Another argument raised by distributors concerns the nudity of the main character and scenes showing women with bare breasts: they demand that Kirikou wear pants and women wear bras, but Michel Ocelot refuses, particularly because he wants to provide a vision of Africa close to what he experienced during his childhood in Guinea. The question of bare breasts nearly derailed the project when Les Armateurs had to request an additional budget from the France 3 channel to finish the film, as the responsible person at the time imposed covering the breasts as a sine qua non condition for funding. Fortunately for the film team, this person left the channel shortly after, and their replacement agreed to complete the budget without requiring the addition of bras.

The choice of a distributor for the French release of the film ultimately occurs only shortly before the release. Producer Didier Brunner contracts with Gebeka Films, a recently founded provincial distributor, for a theatrical release at the beginning of December 1998. The distribution also receives support from the French Association of Art and Experimental Cinemas. The issues regarding the nudity of the characters ultimately pose no problems at the time of the film's reception in France.

The sale of the film to foreign distributors does not pose a problem in most cases; when the film does not have a theatrical release, it is screened by French cultural centers. Only distribution in the Anglo-Saxon world poses problems, as distributors refuse to accept the nudity of Kirikou and several other characters. In the United States, Universal Pictures attempts to impose the addition of pants and bras as conditions for distributing the film. The film was ultimately distributed in the United States by a small Franco-American company, which bypasses the issue by choosing not to present Kirikou to the ratings board, at the risk of making it suspect; they do, however, decide to warn parents about the nudity shown in the film by placing notices at the entrances to screening rooms. In the United Kingdom, the BBC declares it impossible to show Kirikou's "frontal nudity"; the film does not find a distributor in Great Britain until 2003, the year in which distributors' interest is revived by the British Animation Award given to the film.

The film does not find a distributor in Japan until 2002; Michel Ocelot, then invited to a meeting at the Maison Franco-Japonaise in Tokyo, has the opportunity to meet Isao Takahata. He appreciates the film and arranges its theatrical release in Japan through Studio Ghibli. Takahata, who studied French and knows French culture well, translates Ocelot's Kirikou novel into Japanese, writes the Japanese subtitles for the original version screenings, translates dialogues for the Japanese dubbing, and takes care of the casting. The theme song for the Japanese release is "Hadaka no Kiriku" by Taeko Ōnuki.

In 2007, the film was distributed in Mali, Niger, and Benin through the digital cinema association, which organizes itinerant screenings of the film in popular neighborhoods or villages. The family audience warmly welcomes this film and the subsequent works of Michel Ocelot.

== Reception ==
=== Critical reception in France ===
Upon its release in France, the film receives a favorable critical reception in mainstream media. Jacques Mandelbaum, in Le Monde, highlights the originality of Kirikou, which "stands out from the traditional celluloid behemoths landing at this time of year simply because, by showing things differently, it says something else, thinks in a different way, dreams in another manner." Bernard Génin, in Télérama, considers the film "colorful, funny, and lively", "very simple and very beautiful", and believes that the story takes on "timeless resonances, avoiding heaviness and didacticism". Michel Roudevitch, in Libération, states that the film "is full of delightful adventures and stands out for its originality (and beauty) of its craftsmanship, free from caricature stereotypes." Michel Pascal, in Le Point, writes a short yet very positive review, where he describes the whole as a "splendid graphic success, enhanced by the music of Youssou N'Dour" and sees it as "a gem of European animation".

The reception from specialized press is also favorable. Gilles Ciment, in Positif, gives the film a generally positive reception: he sees it as an "ambitious" work that presents all the characteristics of a fairy tale while ingeniously avoiding the archetypes of the genre. While praising the splendor of the sets, bodies, and faces, he regrets a certain stiffness in the animation and "computer graphics shortcuts that contrast with the overall aesthetics". He views Kirikou as "a fable about Africa's fate" that also contains reflections on gender relations. In the summer of 2000, a little over a year after the film's release, the magazine Ciné-Bulles devotes a detailed review to it, in which Yves Schaëffner analyzes the subtleties of the screenplay and praises the African identity of the tale as well as its refusal to adhere to the standards established by Disney studios.

=== Critical reception elsewhere in the world ===
In Belgium, where the film is released at the end of March 1999, the newspaper Le Soir gives it an excellent review: Fabienne Bradfer is fully convinced, by both the screenplay and the graphics, and judges that "the quality of the original screenplay and the direction place this animated film among the best of the decade."

The film is released in the United States in February 2000, in conjunction with Black History Month: it opens in theaters in New York, followed by Chicago and Los Angeles. A preview screening takes place in December 1999 at the African Diaspora Film Festival in New York. Elvis Mitchell, in The New York Times, gives an overall positive assessment of the film, highlighting its originality compared to American productions, the quality of the soundtrack and music, and the coherence of the graphic choices: "It is a large-scale animated delivery with its own cultural imperative." Mitchell specifically compares the graphic style of the characters to the pictograms of African-American artist Romare Bearden. However, he feels that the film retains "a modesty of scale that limits its power", concluding: "It's more a piece to admire than to be involved by, yet it's easy to imagine children hypnotized by a hero tinier than they are when Kirikou is continually loaded into the VCR."

In the United Kingdom, where the film only sees a real theatrical release in 2003, Kirikou also enjoys a favorable reception. BBC critic Jamie Russell, emphasizes that the different levels of meaning in the story make it accessible to both young children and adults, and judges that the result is "one of the most enchanting animated features in quite some time." Peter Bradshaw in The Guardian writes one of the more negative reviews, considering the film "reasonable, but perhaps only for very young children."

=== Influence on the animation industry ===
The success of Kirikou and the Sorceress greatly benefits French animated cinema in the following years: by demonstrating that a French animated feature film can be very profitable, it encourages investors to take ongoing projects more seriously, whereas previously, filmmakers struggled to finance them. Interviewed by Le Monde in December 2004, Stéphane Le Bars, General Delegate of the Syndicate of Animation Film Producers, states: "Since then, we have witnessed a real revival in feature film production. (...) In 2003, five out of the seven French animated films were among the fifty most viewed films of the year."

The same article does nuance this renewal by indicating that financing in the animation sector remains delicate, but this period allows several other feature films to gather less precarious budgets than that of Kirikou. Thus, Michel Ocelot encounters far fewer difficulties in raising 8.5 million euros to make Azur and Asmar, which he is also able to produce entirely in Paris rather than in a dispersed manner like Kirikou. In a 2006 interview, Michel Ocelot summarizes: "All professionals agree that there was a before and after Kirikou and the Sorceress. By surpassing a million viewers, I showed that a French animated film could be profitable." That same year, Jacques-Rémy Girerd, another feature film director, emphasizes that Kirikou also attracted public attention: "It took Kirikou for the public to reconnect with animated films." In a 2007 interview, animation film producer Philippe Alessandri speaks of a Kirikou effect that facilitated the financing of the film he was preparing in 1998, The Children of the Rain, directed by Philippe Leclerc and released in 2003.

The success of Kirikou and the Sorceress can be seen in retrospect as part of a series of successes of French animation films such as The Triplets of Belleville by Sylvain Chomet (2003) and Persepolis by Vincent Paronnaud and Marjane Satrapi (2007), which achieve both critical and commercial success, both in France and abroad; these films earn the expertise of French animators international recognition and contribute to representing French culture abroad. A book on French animation published in 2017, nearly twenty years after the film's release, refers to the twenty years from 1998 to 2017 as "a genuine little golden age" and discusses the role of the success of Kirikou in these terms: "Legend or reality, the microcosm of French animation now considers that the rebirth of French animated film results from the unexpected success of Kirikou and the Sorceress by Michel Ocelot, proving that auteur cinema and commercial success are not only compatible but represent the specificity and strength of European animation cinema."

In Africa, the success of Kirikou's adventures is viewed as a good sign for the dissemination of African cultures abroad and for the development of a film industry specific to the continent, which already has many animators and directors but lacks entirely African studios. At the same time, it sparks a reaction from African directors eager to create their own films about their cultures. Franco-Cameroon animator Pierre Awoulbe Sauvalle, co-founder in 1998 of the Senegalese animation studio Pictoon, wants to overcome the paradox of Africa being represented solely by foreign works: "Our cultural richness and our imagination are a part of the escapism that youth needs. When we look at the global success of Kirikou (made by a Frenchman, note) or The Lion King (which is actually the animated film that has brought in the most money for Disney studios) it is quite revealing. We must know how to market our culture, or others will do it for us."

== Analysis ==
=== A tale ===
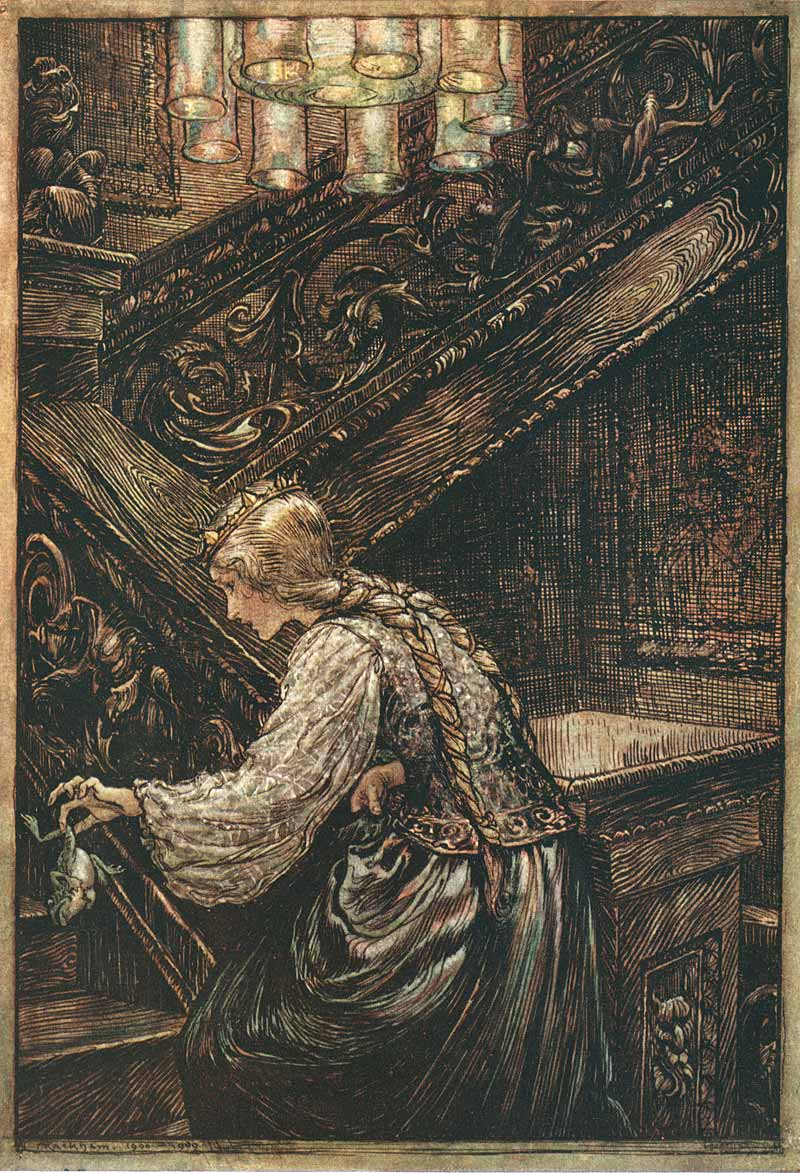
Kirikou borrows from Western fairy tales the motif of the magic kiss, present for example in The Frog King by the Brothers Grimm, illustrated here by Arthur Rackham in 1909.

Through its sources of inspiration and structure, Kirikou and the Sorceress is connected to the genre of fairy tale, just like several previous works by Michel Ocelot (especially his series of short films for television, The Insensitive Princess in 1986 and Ciné si in 1989). Critics agree that the story of Kirikou carries the characteristics of a tale while appreciating that the archetypes mobilized do not confine the result to easy manichaeism. Gilles Ciment, in Positif, notes that while Kirikou's quest is part of an initiatory journey (Kirikou seeks to understand "why Karaba is evil") and the struggle against the forces of evil (to prevent Karaba from imposing her reign of terror on the village), the film's universe escapes schematism and stereotypes: not all "elders" are "wise", Kirikou himself is not without faults, and Karaba's wickedness does not originate from an evil essence but from the suffering caused by others. Yves Schaëffner, in Ciné-Bulles, sees Kirikou's quest as a battle between superstition, represented by the village marabout, and reason, embodied on one hand by Kirikou's intelligence and on the other by the wise man of the mountain, whom he must reach, while Karaba's agents do everything to prevent villagers from accessing knowledge.

=== Gender relations and sexual violence ===
Gender relationships are another important theme of the film. Femininity is associated with round forms (village huts, calabashes, breasts, mother's belly) while the masculine world is characterized by long and sharp objects (daggers, sticks, etc.).

The relationships between men and women are particularly underscored by the interactions between Kirikou and Karaba. The sorceress Karaba, who has kidnapped all the men of the village and turned them into servile fetishes, is herself originally a victim: she was assaulted by a group of men who forced a thorn into her back, which causes her terrible suffering and gives her magical powers. According to Gilles Ciment, Karaba's story allows an allegorical reading: adults could interpret it as a narrative of the trauma of a collective rape. This reading has been developed in psychotherapy. Covered in shame, Karaba has likely been ostracized by her community. Karaba's traumatic experience drives her to turn against those who attacked her and all the villagers. In contrast to the traditional image of the sorceress as inherently evil, Karaba has become mean due to the violence inflicted by men. The inhabitants accuse her of all the misfortunes that befall the village and find her a convenient scapegoat, not going beyond their superstitions or beliefs. Feminist illustrator Sabbah Blanche adds that Karaba, covered in shame, has likely been ousted by her community, driving her to seek revenge. The story told in Kirikou thus, in the background, represents the failure of a community to protect a victim of rape.

For Sabbah Blanche, Karaba carries a trauma that she cannot heal alone, like many victims of sexual violence. Véronique Cormon adds that Karaba exists in a state of dissociation with her body: "She only shows one side of her body and remains still, as if it had no thickness. She is dissociated from her body, the seat of emotions, which represents for her the cause of her suffering."

In response, she also breaks bodies by transforming men into fetishes and killing plants wherever she goes. However, she refuses to reveal her secret, as removing the thorn would make her relive the trauma she experienced. Kirikou must burst the abscess, just as he pierced the monster that drank all the water from the spring, to resolve the situation. The cry Karaba makes when the thorn is removed represents, for Cormon, the symbol of freed speech, no longer imprisoned by the silence imposed on the victim by their aggressors about what they endured.

Kirikou reaches adulthood, and thus masculinity, by removing the thorn from Karaba's back, that is to say, redeeming the harm done by other men with their virility. Thus, violent relationships between the sexes, characterized by an authoritarian conception of masculinity, which later experienced with Karaba the opposite excess of terror imposed by a woman, are succeeded by a reconciliation that opens up to peaceful relationships between the sexes. In seeking the reason for Karaba's wickedness, Kirikou engages in an act of repair rather than revenge. Catherine Lanone sees Kirikou's metamorphosis as a feminist perspective: unlike classic tales, it is not a charming prince who awakens a sleeping princess, but a woman who makes a child into a man through a kiss. This message "advocates resilience and autonomy, but also openness to others."

=== Political and religious readings ===
Several critics also see a political dimension in the film related to the contemporary situation of African countries. Gilles Ciment sees Kirikou's journey as "the complicated adventure of Africa's emancipation, which must stop enduring and take its destiny into its own hands." According to Yves Schaëffner, Ocelot, through this tale, professes "his discomfort with an Africa still imprisoned by an elite that misuses its power and keeps people in ignorance."

Religious readings of the film, or the search for religious inspirations in the plot, have been common among remarks and questions that Michel Ocelot reports having received in various regions of the world: Kirikou was compared, for example, to Christianity, Buddhism, or Islam; Ocelot indicates that he did not draw inspiration from any particular religion.

== Adaptations and merchandise ==
=== Merchandise ===
No derivative rights from the film are exploited at the time of the release of Kirikou; it is only with the unexpected success of the film that merchandise begins to be gradually developed. Michel Ocelot closely monitors the commercial exploitation of Kirikou, which he says he has accepted "sometimes with amusement, sometimes with reluctance", on the one hand to secure less limited budgets for his subsequent films, and on the other because some objects made around Kirikou seemed interesting in themselves. Ocelot is compelled to register the name "Kirikou" as a trademark to control its use.

The film's music is not released in full. Only a CD single is released by EMI Virgin Music in December 1998; it contains the main song of the film, written, composed, and produced by Youssou N'Dour and performed by Mendy Boubacar, as well as the instrumental version of the song. This single is released in Japan by Toshiba in June 2003. The two versions of the song are reissued in 2003 in the compilation Youssou N'Dour et ses amis released by Warner Music. In 2003, another single is released in Japan dedicated to the song "Hadaka no Kiriku", the Japanese version of "Kirikou, the Naked Child", in its sung version (performed by Taeko Ōnuki) and its instrumental version.

A novel retelling the film, written by Michel Ocelot, is published by Livre de Poche, followed by an illustrated book recounting the film, published by Milan in 2001. In the following years, several illustrated children's books developing original adventures of Kirikou (Kirikou and the Black Hyena, Kirikou and the Golden Horned Buffalo, Kirikou and the Lost Fetish) are published by the same publisher. The successful bookstore sales of these works lead to the conception of a project for new adventures of Kirikou on DVD, which ultimately results in the feature film Kirikou and the Wild Beasts. An illustrated book by Michel Ocelot recounting the creation of Kirikou and the Sorceress, All About Kirikou, is published in 2003 by Éditions du Seuil.

A video game based on the film, Kirikou, was designed by Étranges Libellules and published by Wanadoo Éditions in November 2001. It is an action game on CD-ROM for PC, playable in Windows 95, 98, Windows Me, and Windows XP. Aimed at young children, it follows the story of the film through eight levels in which the player embodies Kirikou.

=== Video releases ===
==== DVD ====
The DVD of Kirikou and the Sorceress, published by France Télévisions Distribution, was released at the end of September 1999. It contained only the film, without any extras. Another edition was released by the same publisher in December 2002 and this included a set of extras (the trailer, production notes, filmographies, a documentary, and a making of). Another DVD edition was released, also from France Télévisions, in April 2005, including production notes, the film's song, a quiz, and a question-and-answer session with Michel Ocelot.

A collector's edition in two DVDs was released in October 2003. It included a karaoke, an interview with Michel Ocelot, a scene in multiple languages, a comparison between the animated storyboard and the finished scene, as well as DVD-Rom tracks (games, coloring books, wallpapers, and a screensaver). The film was then reissued in October 2008 in a set called the "Kirikou Complete Collection" which also included the second film Kirikou and the Wild Beasts, the musical Kirikou and Karaba, a documentary Kirikou Presents the Animals of Africa, and a coloring booklet with colored pencils.

The film's DVD releases were commercially successful. By December 2005, 700,000 copies of the DVD had been sold.

==== Blu-ray ====
The film was released on Blu-ray by France Télévisions in August 2008. The extras were the same as those included with the DVD edition from 2005, with the addition of a presentation of characters, a glossary, and a session of children's questions to Michel Ocelot.

== Accolades ==
Year	Award Show	Award	Category	Result
1999	Annecy International Animation Film Festival	Grand Prix	Best Animation Film	Won
1999	Castellinaria International Festival of Young Cinema		Environment and Health Award	Won
1999	Castellinaria International Festival of Young Cinema		Silver Castle	Won
1999	Chicago International Children's Film Festival	Adult's Jury Award	Feature Film and Video – Animation	Won
1999	Chicago International Children's Film Festival	Children's Jury Award	Feature Film and Video – Animation	Won
1999	Cinekid Festival		Cinekid Film Award	Won
1999	Kecskemét Animation Film Festival	Kecskemét City Prize	KAFF Award	Won
1999	Oulu International Children's Film Festival		C.I.F.E.J. Award	Won
1999	Oulu International Children's Film Festival		Starboy Award	Nominated
2000	18th Ale Kino! International Young Audience Film Festival	Silver Poznan Goats	Best Animation Film	Won
2000	18th Ale Kino! International Young Audience Film Festival	Poznan Goats	Best Original Script in Foreign Movie	Won
2000	18th Ale Kino! International Young Audience Film Festival	Marcinek – Children's Jury Special Mention	Animation for Older Children	Won
2000	Cartagena Film Festival	Prize of the Children's Cinema Competition Jury	Best Feature Film for Children	Won
2000	Montréal International Children's Film Festival	Special Jury Prize	Feature Film	Won
2002	British Animation Awards	British Animation Award	Best European Feature Film	Won (tied with Chicken Run)
2009	Lola Kenya Children's Screen		Audience's Choice Award	Won

== Sources ==
- Ocelot, Michel (5 December 2003). "Des noms". Tout sur Kirikou [All about Kirikou] (in French). Paris: Seuil. ISBN 2-02-062827-9.
