= Didier Brunner =

French film producer

Didier Brunner is a French film producer.

Brunner originally began working in the film industry as an assistant director and later director on educational documentary films. He later moved into working in the field of animation.

In 1987, Brunner founded Trans-Europe Film, in which he produced animated productions such as Michel Ocelot's Tales of the Night.

In 1994, he left Trans-Europe Film and started Les Armateurs where he has produced animations such as The Old Lady and the Pigeons, Lupo Alberto, Carland Cross and The Triplets of Belleville by Sylvain Chomet, and Kirikou and the Sorceress and other films by Michel Ocelot.

== Filmography as producer ==
- 1992: Tales of the Night (TV movie)
- 1996: Carland Cross (TV series)
- 1998: Lupo Alberto (TV series)
- 1998: The Old Lady and the Pigeons (short film)
- 1998: Kirikou and the Sorceress
- 1999: Charley and Mimmo (TV series)
- 2000: Princes and Princesses
- 2001: Belphegor (TV series)
- 2001: The Boy Who Wanted to Be a Bear
- 2003: The Triplets of Belleville
- 2005: Kiri le clown (TV series)
- 2005: Kirikou and the Wild Beasts
- 2006: L'Equilibre de la terreur
- 2009: The Secret of Kells
- 2010: Kill Me Please (live-action film)
- 2012: Ernest & Celestine
- 2012: Kirikou and the Men and Women
- 2015: The Long Long Holiday
- 2020: Wolfwalkers
- 2021: The Summit of the Gods
