= Dilili in Paris =

2018 animated film

- French theatrical release poster
- French: Dilili à Paris
- Directed by: Michel Ocelot
- Written by: Michel Ocelot
- Produced by: Christophe Rossignon; Philip Boëffard
- Starring: Prunelle Charles-Ambron; Enzo Ratsito; Natalie Dessay; Liliane Rovère
- Edited by: Patrick Ducruet
- Music by: Gabriel Yared
- Production companies: Nord-Ouest Films; Studio O; Arte France Cinéma; Mars Films; Wild Bunch; Artémis Productions; Senator Film Produktion; Mac Guff
- Distributed by: Mars Films (France); Cinéart (Belgium); Wild Bunch Germany (Germany)
- Release dates: 11 June 2018 (Annecy Festival); 10 October 2018 (France); 24 October 2018 (Belgium); 1 May 2019 (Germany)
- Running time: 95 minutes
- Countries: France; Germany; Belgium
- Language: French
- Budget: €6.9 million
- Box office: $5.1 million

Dilili in Paris (French: Dilili à Paris) is a 2018 animated period adventure film written and directed by Michel Ocelot, with pre-production by Studio O and animation production by Mac Guff, about a Kanak girl investigating a mystery in Paris in the Belle Époque. It stars the voices of Prunelle Charles-Ambron, Enzo Ratsito, and Natalie Dessay as Emma Calvé in the original, French-language version.

The film had an invitation-only world premiere on 11 June 2018 as the opening ceremony feature, and its public premiere on June 12, at the Annecy International Animation Film Festival before being released in cinemas on October 10 in France, on October 24 in Belgium and in 2019 in Germany. It won the César Award for Best Animated Feature at the 44th César Awards.

It has been licensed for distribution in the United States and English-speaking Canada by Samuel Goldwyn Films (having already been released in Quebec by Axia Films), who released it in cinemas in 2019.

== Synopsis ==
During the Belle Époque, the little mixed race girl Dilili was part of a Kanak village set up in a Parisian public garden. Orel, a scooter driver, slips into the enclosure to meet Dilili, who finds him in the evening. She tells him her story: she has both European ancestors and Kanak ancestors, she was educated by Madame Michel (who is none other than Louise Michel), then on her arrival in Paris, she met a countess who taught her good manners. Orel offers Dilili a ride around Paris on his scooter while he makes his deliveries. Enthusiastic, Dilili discovers the streets and squares of Paris. They meet Marie Curie, to whom Orel had to bring her daughter Ève, then the singer Emma Calvé, friend of Orel, who likes to sing on the underground lake which extends under the Garnier Opera, as well as the writer Marcel Proust in the company of his friend Reynaldo Hahn. The little girl writes down in her notebook the names of the celebrities she meets and who give her all kinds of ideas for jobs she would like to do later. Very quickly, Dilili is intrigued by the announcements from newspaper sellers: little girls are regularly kidnapped by a network of bandits who sign their crimes under the name “Male-Masters”. Dilili immediately decides to investigate to find the missing girls. Herself the victim of a first kidnapping attempt in a public garden, she is saved by Orel.

The investigation leads Dilili and Orel to the Moulin du Diable, in Montparnasse, in the poor neighbourhoods where they are poorly received. They cross the fence, but are attacked by a rabid mastiff who bites Orel at the risk of transmitting the disease to him. Dilili puts Orel in the scooter and races back down the slope to the Pasteur Institute, where she begs Louis Pasteur to vaccinate Orel. Once the latter is out of danger, the investigation can resume. Pasteur and his entourage give new leads to the investigative duo. They then go to the boat wash, a building which houses many painters of the moment. There, they learn that the bandits regularly meet in front of the Moulin Rouge shows . Dilili meets Colette there, then the painter and poster artist Henri de Toulouse-Lautrec, who helps them spot two Male Masters. By eavesdropping on their conversation, Dilili learns that they are preparing to rob a jewelry store using equipment that one of the bandits will collect "at the gates of hell" . The two young detectives immediately go to the police, but no one believes them. Their painter friends direct them to the workshop of the sculptor Auguste Rodin, because the “gate of hell” is the name of one of his sculptures. Dilili admires a work by Camille Claudel there. When they arrive in the garden where the “door to hell” is located, the bandit is already there and Orel pursues him without success: as soon as he steps out into the street, the Male Master inexplicably disappears. However, they take their post to watch for the robbery around the jewelry store. Dilili distracts the bandit who stands guard, while Orel unharnesses the horse from his carriage. When the bandit responsible for the robbery comes out of the jewellery store, Dilili uses his skipping rope to entangle his legs and make him fall: his loot spills on the ground and the two bandits are arrested by the police. An admiring witness, who turns out to be the Prince of Wales passing through Paris, supports Dilili in the face of an unfriendly police officer.

Dilili and Orel rest with Emma Calvé, who helps them with her advice. His driver, Lebeuf, makes racist and unpleasant remarks to Dilili at their first meeting. Some time later, Dilili is the victim of a second kidnapping attempt by an old man who pretends to fall. But Dilili recognizes the Male Master by the ring he wears in his nose and Orel's intervention pushes the “old man” to flee. Unfortunately, Emma Calvé entrusts Dilili to Lebeuf some time later. However, he was approached by a Male Master who promised to improve his lot if he delivered the little girl to them. In the evening, Emma Calvé and Orel wait for Dilili in vain: she has been kidnapped. The next day, Lebeuf comes to Emma Calvé's house. In front of her and Orel, stunned, he tells them what happened: he delivered Dilili to the Male Masters as agreed and was able to enter their underground lair. Male Masters control the sewers, allowing them to appear and disappear very quickly. Their leader, the Grand Male Master, dressed in a plum-colored tunic, is convinced that women risk taking power and he seeks to enslave them. In the den of the Male Masters, the kidnapped little girls are educated to be nothing but“four-legged”, who are dressed in black, walk on all fours and are slaves to men to the point of serving them as seats. It was too much even for Lebeuf, who slipped away and now wants to help Emma Calvé and Orel fight against the Male Masters.

Lebeuf guides Emma Calvé and Orel into the sewers under the Garnier opera house, to one of the entrances to the Male-Masters' lair. Orel finds, floating on the water, pages torn by Dilili from her notebook and which she has scattered to indicate where the Male Masters have taken her. While everyone searches for her, Dilili is re-educated with the other little girls, forced to walk on all fours. But she escapes by diving into the sewers. Just when she comes across a closed gate and despairs, Orel, Emma Calvé and Lebeuf arrive and rescue her. Everyone returns to rest at the opera. They then meet Sarah Bernhardt, who welcomes them to her luxurious residence. Dilili rests there and regains hope while everyone devises a plan to rescue the little girls. The Male-Masters' lair is ventilated by an old factory chimney equipped with a weather vane in the shape of a snake. We can therefore deliver the little girls from the air using a light airship operated by pedals. It was the engineer Alberto Santos-Dumont who designed the plan for the balloon, but its large dimensions and the urgency of the situation were such that Sarah Bernhardt called on the German baron Ferdinand von Zeppelin to manufacture it.

In the evening, the airship waits for the investigators on the roof of the Garnier opera house. The plan works as planned and the young girls climb back up the chimney using a rope ladder. The airship then reaches the Eiffel Tower and the Champ de Mars, where Emma Calvé sings a divine tune in honor of the little girls and Dilili. The kidnapped little girls are reunited with their parents and the Male Masters network is dismantled. For Dilili, life in Paris is only just beginning.

== Cast ==
- Prunelle Charles-Ambron as Dilili
- Enzo Ratsito as Orel
- Natalie Dessay as Emma Calvé
- Elisabeth Duda as Marie Curie, Gertrude Stein, Élisabeth Greffulhe, Madeleine Lemaire
- Olivier Voisin as Erik Satie
- Liliane Rovère as Louise Michel
- Bruno Paviot as Lebeuf, Louis Pasteur, The Lumière brothers, the sewerman
- Jérémy Lopez as Toulouse-Lautrec, Paul Poiret, Félix Vallotton, the Male-Master Coachman
- Harrison Arevalo as Pablo Picasso
- Thissa d'Avila Bensalah as Colette, Camille Claudel, Suzanne Valadon, Berthe Morisot
- Michel Elias as Pierre-Auguste Renoir, Constantin Brâncuși, Ernest Renan, the Male Master at the opera, the false old man, the impresario
- Nicolas Planchais as Sergei Diaghilev, the Grand Male Master, Bancroche
- Pascal Pestel as Amedeo Modigliani
- Paul Bandey as Prince of Wales, future Edward VII
- Isabelle Guiard as Sarah Bernhardt, Anna de Noailles, La Goulue, the mistress supervisor, the mother of the family
- Karim M'Riba as Claude Debussy
- Olivier Claverie as Edgar Degas, Claude Monet, Gustave Eiffel, Auguste Rodin, Georges Clemenceau, the police commissioner
- Nicolas Lormeau as Henri Rousseau, Marcel Proust, André Gide, Chocolat, Antoine Bourdelle, the Male-Master Supervisor
- Nicolas Gonzalès as Alberto Santos-Dumont, Reynaldo Hahn, Maurice Ravel
- Julien Azoulay as Henri Matisse
- David Bertrand as Filippo Tommaso Marinetti
- Swan Mirabeau as Ève and Irène Curie
- Serge Bagdassarian as the butter plate salesman, the Bike Master, Randolphe, the inspector at the Moulin Rouge

== Production ==
=== Development ===
Director, writer, and designer Michel Ocelot has said that two starting points for the production were his desire to create a work set in Paris, and an originally separate desire to create one on the topic of male suppression and abuse of women and girls.

He chose to combine these in a narrative which takes place in the Belle Époque, roughly in the 1900s, a decade in which several historical firsts for women in France were made.

The film depicts some of the many notable historical figures who were often present in the city at the time, and features a fictionalized version of the opera singer Emma Calvé as a supporting character. However, it simultaneously intentionally diverges from real history (and, as the director readily admits, laws of science) in its metaphorical main plot and inclusion of retrofuturist technology influenced by various works of Jules Verne and The Phantom of the Opera by Gaston Leroux.

=== Animation production ===
The 3D rendering style continues in that used in Azur & Asmar, in that the fabric, hair, and so on of the three-dimensional models is rendered as solid colours with no shading, though it differs in that the characters' bodies (which in Azur & Asmar were shaded from a fixed angle, in a style inspired by late medieval art) are defined with a tracing effect developed from that used in Kirikou and the Men and Women.

The scenery incorporates photographs, taken by Ocelot over four years, of structures which survive from the depicted era or earlier, including the Palais Garnier, Bouillon Racine, Maxim's and the Paris sewers and objects from the collections of the Musée d'Orsay, Musée de l'École de Nancy, Musée Carnavalet, Musée Rodin, Musée du quai Branly – Jacques Chirac, and Musée Marmottan Monet, which are used directly as two-dimensional elements or for texture mapping rather than as reference material. Others were recreated in three dimensions, including the Eiffel Tower, which was based directly on architectural drawings from Gustave Eiffel's company. The digital library of the Bibliothèque nationale de France, Gallica, was used for research and for two-dimensional empherea that were incorporated directly.

Unlike Ocelot's two previous feature films, Tales of the Night and Kirikou and the Men and Women, Dilili has not been released in stereoscopic 3D.

== Release ==
In North America, the film was released in cinemas in Quebec on 21 December 2018 by Axia Films and on video on demand throughout Canada by them on 7 March 2019, in both instances in French with no English options. It was released in cinemas in the United States and English-speaking Canada on 4 October 2019 by Samuel Goldwyn Films, with an English-language dub.

In Australia, the film was played in cinemas as part of the 30th Alliance Française French Film Festival, which ran from 5 March to 18 April 2019 in 9 cities across the country, and it was released on DVD and video on demand in Australia and New Zealand on 10 July 2019 by Madman Entertainment, in both instances in French with English subtitles only.

In China, the film was selected for competition at the 2019 Shanghai International Film Festival.

== Reception ==
On the review aggregator website Rotten Tomatoes, 67% of 27 critics' reviews are positive, with an average rating of 6.6/10. Metacritic, which uses a weighted average, assigned the film a score of 37 out of 100, based on 4 critics, indicating "generally unfavorable" reviews.

== Accolades ==
At the 4th International Historical Fiction Film Festival, held in Plaisance-du-Touch in September 2018, Dilili won the Press Award for Best Feature Film. On 4 February 2019 at the 24th Lumière Awards it won Best Animated Film, and on 22 February 2019 at the 44th César Awards it won the César Award for Best Animated Feature.
