= The Insensitive Princess =

- Original French title card
- Also known as: The Impassive Princess; The Insensitive Princess
- La Princesse insensible
- Genre: Fairy tale cartoon series
- Created by: Michel Ocelot
- Written by: Michel Ocelot
- Directed by: Michel Ocelot
- Voices of: Yves Arcanel
- Narrated by: Michel Ocelot
- Composer: Christian Maire
- Country of origin: France
- Original language: French
- No. of seasons: 1
- No. of episodes: 13

Production
- Editor: Michèle Péju
- Running time: 4 minutes
- Production companies: Antenne 2 animation art graphique audiovisuel

Original release
- Network: Antenne 2
- Release: December 21, 1983

The Insensitive Princess (French: La Princesse insensible) is a 1983 French animated television series written and directed by Michel Ocelot. The animation is a combination of cel and cutout animation (with the opening credits in silhouette animation) while the elaborate architectural style of the production design has been said to be reminiscent, through visual association, of Charles Perrault and Jean de La Fontaine's fairy tales; like Ocelot's Les Trois Inventeurs before it and several episodes of the later Ciné si it takes place in a literary fairy-tale fantasy setting, specifically a palatial theater, which mixes the ornate styles of decoration and dress of the upper classes of both the time of the Ancien Régime and the Belle Époque and includes such fanciful technology as a baroque submarine, elements of outright fantasy such as dragons and such anachronisms as a reference to motorcycles.

It won first prize in its category at the 3rd Bourg-en-Bresse Animation Festival for Youth and the audience prize at the 6th Odense Film Festival.

== Plot ==
The king's daughter, nicknamed the insensitive princess, is in need of a suitor. It has been decided that the prince who will make her show emotion will win her hand in marriage. Multiple princes attempt the feat of entertaining the princess, combining elaborate acts of artistry, prowess and more. However, at the end of each episode, the princess remains unfazed, appearing confused, to the dismay of the princes. At last, when all seems lost, a schoolboy prince presents himself in the palace theater with a large heart, surprising the princess. The schoolboy had correctly predicted that the princess was short-sighted. He suits her with a pair of glasses, allowing her to witness the acts and theatricals she had previously been unable to distinguish, and is now entertained. The schoolboy prince wins the princess over and everyone celebrates.

== Episodes ==
1. Le Prince dompteur (The Tamer Prince)
2. Le Prince jardinier (The Gardener Prince)
3. Le Prince à transformations (The Transforming Prince)
4. Le Prince météorologue (The Meteorologist Prince)
5. Le Prince sourcier (The Dowser Prince)
6. Le Prince volant (The Flying Prince)
7. Le Prince sous-marin (The Submarine Prince)
8. Le Prince peintre (The Painter Prince)
9. Le Prince décorateur (The Decorator Prince)
10. Le Prince magicien (The Magician Prince)
11. Le Prince qui fait semblant (The Pretending Prince)
12. Le Prince artificier (The Pyrotechnist Prince)
13. Le Prince écolier (The Schoolboy Prince)

== International broadcasts ==
Country	Title	Network
Argentina	La Princesa insensible	
Mexico	La Princesa insensible	Once TV
Israel	הנסיכה האדישה	Israeli Educational Television
Portugal	A Princesa insensível	Canal 1
