= The Old Lady and the Pigeons =

- Theatrical release poster
- Directed by: Sylvain Chomet
- Written by: Sylvain Chomet
- Produced by: Didier Brunner; Bernard Lajoie
- Edited by: Chantal Colibert; Hélène Girard
- Music by: Jean Corti
- Production companies: Les Armateurs; Django Films; Folimage; BBC; Téléfilm Canada
- Distributed by: Les Grands Films Classiques
- Release dates: 1997 (Annecy Film Festival); 27 May 1998
- Running time: 24 minutes
- Countries: France; Belgium; United Kingdom; Canada
- Language: English

The Old Lady and the Pigeons (French: La vieille dame et les pigeons) is a 1997 animated short film written and directed by Sylvain Chomet. It tells the slightly surreal story of a starving policeman who dresses up as a pigeon and tricks an old lady into feeding him. The film was produced through the French company Les Armateurs with support from companies in Canada, Belgium and the United Kingdom. It was Chomet's debut film and won several awards including the Grand Prix at the Annecy International Animated Film Festival.

== Plot ==
A Parisian police officer who lives in squalor observes an old lady overfeeding pigeons in a garden square. The sight haunts his thoughts as the old lady gives the pigeons delicate and refined dishes while he himself is starving. After having a nightmare in which giant anthropomorphic pigeons disembowel him, the officer tracks the old lady to her apartment, constructs a giant pigeon costume, and invites himself into the old lady's home. Despite the officer's rudeness, the old lady sees no inconvenience and feeds him copiously upon each visit, causing him to gradually gain weight. Each day, the officer passes by a concierge, and one of the old lady's portraits shows her younger self surrounded by overweight cats.

On Christmas Eve, the officer drunkenly ventures into the old lady's kitchen, where he discovers the old lady sharpening shears in preparation for a meal for the concierge, who is dressed like a cat. Realizing the old lady's true intent for the pigeons, the officer unsuccessfully attempts to remove his costume and escape the apartment. Pursued by the old lady to the top of a cupboard, the officer manages to remove his shoe and show his bare foot, but the proof of his humanity does not deter the madwoman. The cupboard topples over and sends the officer crashing through the window. He plummets to the ground much like the corpulent and imbalanced pigeons in the square.

In the epilogue, some American tourists are scared off by the shirtless officer, now thin again and behaving as a pigeon.

== Dialogue ==
In Tati-esque fashion, the bulk of the film is without any dialogue at all. And what there is in English: supplied by overweight American tourists in the opening and closing scenes.

== Production ==
Sylvain Chomet had been based in London and worked as an animator in advertisement since the 1980s. He returned to his native France in 1990 and, inspired by Nick Park's Creature Comforts, set about making his own film. Chomet pitched The Old Lady and the Pigeons to Didier Brunner, producer at Les Amateurs, with whom he began to work on the film in 1991. The producers had difficulties raising enough money, but decided to start anyway, with money from the National Center of Cinematography. The backgrounds were designed by Nicolas de Crécy, who had studied with Chomet and previously collaborated on comics projects. The team produced the film's first four minutes at the Folimage studios in Bourg-lès-Valence. They then attempted to use the finished footage to attract more investors, but failed. In 1993, Chomet relocated to Canada in hope of a fresh start; however, Brunner suddenly managed to pre-sell the film to the BBC and several other broadcasters, and production could continue. Five years after production started the film was completed.

== Reception ==
The film competed at the 1997 Annecy International Animated Film Festival. On 27 May 1998, it was released theatrically in France through Les Grands Films Classiques. It was screened together with the animated short film Bob's Birthday, directed by Alison Snowden and David Fine. Bernard Génin reviewed The Old Lady and the Pigeons for Télérama and called Chomet's directing "brilliant". He also complimented Crécy's background art, and wrote: "Paris streets, cozy interiors, characters' puffy faces – each shot is a beauty! Yes, the traditional, handmade cartoon can still surprise us."

=== Accolades ===
The film won the Grand Prix for best short film at the Annecy Festival. It went on to win the British BAFTA Award and Canadian Genie Award for Best Animated Short. It was nominated for best animated short at France's 1998 César Awards, and the United States' Academy Award for Best Animated Short Film at the 70th Academy Awards.

Event	Award	Outcome
70th Academy Awards	Best Animated Short Film	Nominated
1999 Algarve International Film Festival	Grand Prize of the City of Portimão	Nominated
1998 Angers European First Film Festival	Audience Award, Short Film	Won
1998 Angers European First Film Festival	European Jury Award, Short Film	Won
1997 Annecy International Animated Film Festival	Grand Prix, Best Animated Short	Won
50th British Academy Film Awards	Best Animated Short Film	Won
1997 Cartoon Forum	Cartoon d'or	Won
César Awards 1998	Best Short Film, animation	Nominated
18th Genie Awards	Best Animated Short	Won
1998 Hiroshima International Animation Festival	Grand Prize	Won
1997 World Animation Celebration	Grand Prize	Won

== Bibliography ==
- Lenburg, Jeff (2006). Who's who in animated cartoons. New York, NY: Applause Theatre & Cinema Books. p. 45. ISBN 9781557836717.
