= César Award for Best Animated Film =

French animation award

- Country: France
- Presented by: Académie des Arts et Techniques du Cinéma
- First award: 2011
- Currently held by: Arco (2026)
- Website: academie-cinema.org

The César Award for Best Animated Film is awarded annually by the Académie des Arts et Techniques du Cinéma since 2011.

== Winners and nominees ==
=== 2010s ===
Year	English title	Original title	Director(s)
2011 (36th)	The Illusionist	L'Illusionniste	Sylvain Chomet
2011 (36th)	Arthur 3: The War of the Two Worlds	Arthur et la Guerre des deux mondes	Luc Besson
2011 (36th)	The Man in the Blue Gordini	L'Homme à la Gordini	Jean-Christophe Lie
2011 (36th)	Logorama		H5 (François Alaux, Hervé de Crécy, Ludovic Houplain)
2011 (36th)	A Cat in Paris	Une vie de chat	Jean-Loup Felicioli and Alain Gagnol
2012 (37th)	The Rabbi's Cat	Le Chat du rabbin	Joann Sfar and Antoine Delesvaux
2012 (37th)	The Circus	Le Cirque	Nicolas Brault
2012 (37th)	Mouse's Tale	La Queue de la souris	Benjamin Renner
2012 (37th)	A Monster in Paris	Un monstre à Paris	Bibo Bergeron
2012 (37th)	The Painting	Le Tableau	Jean-François Laguionie
2013 (38th)	Ernest & Celestine	Ernest et Célestine	Benjamin Renner, Vincent Patar and Stéphane Aubier
2013 (38th)	Edmond Was a Donkey	Edmond était un âne	Franck Dion
2013 (38th)	Kirikou and the Men and Women	Kirikou et les hommes et les femmes	Michel Ocelot
2013 (38th)	Oh Willy		Emma de Swaef and Marc Roels
2013 (38th)	Zarafa		Rémi Bezançon and Jean-Christophe Lie
2014 (39th)	Loulou, l'incroyable secret		Éric Omond
2014 (39th)	My Mummy is in America and She Met Buffalo Bill	Ma maman est en Amérique, elle a rencontré Buffalo Bill	Marc Boréal and Thibaut Chatel
2014 (39th)	Aya of Yop City	Aya de Yopougon	Marguerite Abouet and Clément Oubrerie
2015 (40th)	Minuscule: Valley of the Lost Ants	Minuscule - La vallée des fourmis perdues	Thomas Szabo and Hélène Giraud
2015 (40th)	Song of the Sea	Le Chant de la mer	Tomm Moore
2015 (40th)	Jack and the Cuckoo-Clock Heart	Jack et la Mécanique du cœur	Mathias Malzieu and Stéphane Berla
2016 (41st)	The Little Prince	Le Petit Prince	Mark Osborne
2016 (41st)	Adama		Simon Rouby
2016 (41st)	April and the Extraordinary World	Avril et le monde truqué	Franck Ekinci and Christian Desmares
2017 (42nd)	My Life as a Zucchini	Ma vie de Courgette	Claude Barras
2017 (42nd)	The Girl Without Hands	La jeune fille sans mains	Sébastien Laudenbach
2017 (42nd)	The Red Turtle	La tortue rouge	Michaël Dudok de Wit
2018 (43rd)	The Big Bad Fox and Other Tales...	Le Grand méchant renard et autres contes...	Benjamin Renner and Patrick Imbert
2018 (43rd)	Sahara		Pierre Coré
2018 (43rd)	Zombillenium	Zombillénium	Arthur de Pins and Alexis Ducord
2019 (44th)	Dilili in Paris	Dilili à Paris	Michel Ocelot
2019 (44th)	Asterix: The Secret of the Magic Potion	Astérix: Le Secret de la Potion Magique	Alexandre Astier and Louis Clichy
2019 (44th)	Pachamama	Pachamama	Juan Antin

=== 2020s ===
Year	English title	Original title	Director(s)
2020 (45th)	I Lost My Body	J'ai perdu mon corps	Jérémy Clapin
2020 (45th)	The Bears' Famous Invasion of Sicily	La Fameuse Invasion des ours en Sicile	Lorenzo Mattotti
2020 (45th)	The Swallows of Kabul	Les hirondelles de Kaboul	Zabou Breitman and Eléa Gobé Mévellec
2021 (46th)	Josep		Aurel
2021 (46th)	Calamity, a Childhood of Martha Jane Cannary	Calamity, Une Enfance de Martha Jane Cannary	Rémi Chayé
2021 (46th)	Little Vampire	Petit vampire	Joann Sfar
2022 (47th)	The Summit of the Gods	Le Sommet des Dieux	Patrick Imbert
2022 (47th)	The Crossing	La traversée	Florence Miailhe
2022 (47th)	Even Mice Belong in Heaven	Même les souris appartiennent au paradis	Denisa Grimmová and Jan Bubeníček
2023 (48th)	My Sunny Maad	Ma famille afghane	Michaela Pavlátová
2023 (48th)	Ernest & Celestine: A Trip to Gibberitia	Ernest and Célestine: Le Voyage en Charabie	Jean-Christophe Roger, Julien Chheng
2023 (48th)	Little Nicholas: Happy As Can Be	Le Petit Nicolas: Qu'est-ce qu'on attend pour être heureux?	Amandine Fredon, Benjamin Massoubre
2024 (49th)	Chicken for Linda!	Linda veut du poulet!	Chiara Malta, Sébastien Laudenbach
2024 (49th)	Mars Express		Jérémie Périn
2024 (49th)	No Dogs or Italians Allowed	Interdit aux chiens et aux italiens	Alain Unghetto
2025 (50th)	Flow	Straume	Gints Zilbalodis
2025 (50th)	The Most Precious of Cargoes	La Plus Précieuse des marchandises	Michel Hazanavicius
2025 (50th)	Savages	Sauvages	Claude Barras
2026 (51st)	Arco		Ugo Bienvenu
2026 (51st)	Little Amélie or the Character of Rain	Amélie et la métaphysique des tubes	Maïlys Vallade and Liane-Cho Han
2026 (51st)	My Castle Life: Growing Up in Versailles	La vie de château - Mon enfance à Versailles	Clémence Madeleine-Perdrillat and Nathaniel H’Lim

== Multiple wins/nominations ==
=== Wins ===
- Benjamin Renner - 2
- Patrick Imbert - 2

=== Nominations ===
- Benjamin Renner - 3
- Claude Barras - 2
- Michel Ocelot - 2

== See also ==
- César Award for Best Animated Short Film
- Academy Award for Best Animated Feature
- Academy Award for Best Animated Short Film
- BAFTA Award for Best Animated Film
- European Film Award for Best Animated Feature Film
