= Princes et Princesses =

- French film poster.
- Directed by: Michel Ocelot
- Written by: Michel Ocelot
- Produced by: Didier Brunner; Jean-François Laguionie
- Starring: Arlette Mirapeu; Philippe Cheytion; Yves Barsacq
- Edited by: Anita Vilfrid; Michèle Péju; Dominique Lefever
- Music by: Christian Maire
- Production companies: La Fabrique; Les Armateurs; Salud Productions; Studio O
- Distributed by: Gébéka films (France)
- Release dates: 26 January 2000 (France); 16 March 2001 (United States)
- Running time: 70 minutes
- Country: France
- Language: French
- Box office: $43,379 (United States)

Princes et Princesses (Princes and Princesses) is a 2000 compilation film by French animator Michel Ocelot.

The film consists of six episodes of the 1989 French silhouette animation television series Ciné si.

== Release ==
Produced in 1999 by Les Armateurs and released to French cinemas on 26 January 2000, Princes et princesses became Ocelot's second feature film (following 1998's Kirikou and the Sorceress). The feature version comprises slightly edited versions of 6 of the 8 12-minute episodes, with the addition of a 1-minute intermission at the half-way point. In Japan, it was distributed on DVD-Video with the co-operation of Studio Ghibli, initially in the Ghibli Cinema Library and re-released under the Ghibli Museum Library label. The film won both the adult and children's jury awards at the Chicago International Children's Film Festival.

=== Home media ===
As of November 2010, there are no known plans to release Princes et princesses in the United Kingdom or Australia. It has seen home video releases in the United States and earlier in Canada, however, where it is only available as the second disc of a Kirikou and the Sorceress two-DVD set. Both discs have English subtitles, though only for the main feature on each. Also, there is no DVD which uses the full, original, 1.5:1 aspect ratio; they are optimised for either 4:3 or 16:9 screens and playing the pillarboxed widescreen version on a 4:3 television will result in windowboxing.

Country	Title	Format	Region code	Publisher	Date	Catalogue No.	Aspect ratio	Subtitles
South Korea	프린스 앤 프린세스	NTSC	All	Daum Media	2003-05-30	DAD-158	1.37:1 fullscreen	English, Korean
Canada	Kirikou et la sorcière	NTSC	1	Alliance Atlantis	2004-12-21		1.37:1 fullscreen	English, French
United States	Princes and Princesses	NTSC	1	KimStim	2008-07-29		1.37:1 fullscreen	English
France	Princes et princesses	PAL	2	France Télévisions	2004-07-28	EDV 174	1.56:1 anamorphic widescreen	English, French
Japan	プリンス＆プリンセス	NTSC	2	Ghibli Cinema Library/Buena Vista Home Entertainment	2004-12-03; 2007-07-18 (Re-release)	VWDZ8716	1.56:1 anamorphic widescreen	English, French, Japanese
Taiwan	王子與公主	NTSC	3	Power International Multimedia	2005-09-30		1.37:1 fullscreen	English, French, Traditional Chinese
Italy	Principi e Principesse	PAL	2	Alfadiesis; Edizioni Cineteca di Bologna (re-release)	2005-05-05 (first release); 2022-09-25 (re-release)		4:3	Italian, French
