= Henri Pourrat =

French writer and folklore collector

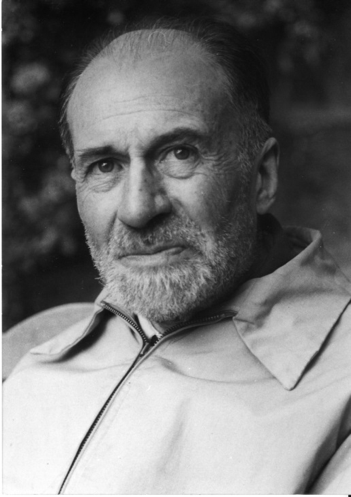
- Henri Pourrat (1954)
- Born: 1887; Ambert, France
- Died: 1959 (aged 71–72); Ambert, France
- Occupations: Writer and folklore collector

Henri Pourrat (7 May 1887- 16 July 1959) was a French writer and folklore collector.

== Biography ==
Pourrat was born in 1887 in Ambert, a town in the mountainous Auvergne region of central France. Born to an Ambert shop-owner, he finished secondary school in 1904 and went to Paris the following year, to prepare for a career in agronomy at the national School of Forestry in Nancy. However, he contracted tuberculosis almost immediately and had to return home, to be long confined to bed in stillness and silence. When sufficiently recovered, he began walking daily, in every weather, the hills and villages around Ambert.

In 1906-1909 Pourrat published locally, under various pseudonyms, extravagant stories in collaboration with his close friend Jean Angeli (1886-1915, pen name Jean L’Olagne) and others. He also wrote poetry and articles on the local dialect or on notable figures of the region. In 1911 he began collecting and publishing folktales and songs, partly under the guidance of the French ethnographer Arnold van Gennep (1873-1957). However, this association did not last. The two differed too greatly in their approach. Unlike van Gennep, Pourrat could not bear to publish tales precisely as received from the teller, flaws and all.

World War I broke out in July 1914, and the young men of the region were soon gone. Unable to join them, Pourrat felt rejected and humiliated. Angeli’s death in action (June 1915) plunged him into “black anguish.” He could only write articles and songs in support of the soldiers from Auvergne. The Ambert region lost 2,500 men out of a total population of about 60,000, and among his age group Pourrat almost alone survived. He also survived the Spanish flu, with which he was bedridden in November 1918. Three months earlier, an accident had killed one younger brother, and the other died in 1923 of injuries suffered as a prisoner of war.

In 1926 Pourrat was at last declared fully healed. An ardent Catholic devoted to the peasantry of his region, he became a vocal champion of the land. World War I had only accelerated the decline of the countryside, and in various ways Pourrat urged a return to the soil. After the French defeat in 1940, the government of Vichy France adopted this stance—one shared by many Catholic conservatives—as official policy. Pourrat’s eloquent and very public support of it and of the régime caused him trouble late in the war and beyond, when association with Vichy endangered many. However, the difficulty passed.

Thereafter Pourrat turned above all to what he considered his life-work: Le Trésor des Contes (The Treasury of Tales), a collection of over 1,000 folktales gathered over the decades from the region around Ambert. He meant it as a compendium of the Auvergne peasant memory. The complete collection first appeared in thirteen volumes (Gallimard, 1948–1962); then in a seven-volume, thematically reorganized edition (Gallimard 1977–1986); and finally in two compact volumes (Omnibus, 2009).

== Literary career ==
Pourrat published some 100 works, from Sur la colline ronde (On the Round Hill, 1912, signed jointly with Jean l’Olagne) to Histoire des gens dans les montagnes du Centre (A History of the People of the Central Mountains, 1959, the year of his death). More appeared posthumously. Novels, essays, historical studies, folktales, and, in his later years, works of Catholic devotion flowed from his pen. In 1928 he received the Legion of Honor and an honorary doctorate from Trinity College Dublin.

Pourrat achieved national literary prominence with Les vaillances, farces et aventures de Gaspard des montagnes (The Mighty Deeds, Pranks, and Adventures of Gaspard from the Mountains), a four-volume novel woven from folktales collected by him, and presented as though told evening after evening by a single old woman teller. In 1921 the first volume won the literary prize given by a major Paris daily, and in 1931 the Académie Française awarded the complete work its Grand Prix du Roman. Pourrat called it “a sort of epic novel of Auvergne a hundred years ago, based on tradition.” In all, Pourrat received five prizes from the Academy, the last being the Prix Gustave Le Métais-Larivière (1957) for the ensemble of his work. In 1941 another major prize, the venerable Prix Goncourt, honored Vent de mars (March Wind), a volume of essays and reflections on the plight of the French peasantry.

Pourrat befriended and corresponded with many distinguished literary figures, among them Francis Jammes, Alexandre Vialatte, Lucien Gachon, Jean Paulhan, Jean Giono, Claude Dravaine, Charles-Ferdinand Ramuz, and Valery Larbaud. Some of this voluminous correspondence has been published, most prominently that with Vialatte and with Paulhan.

== Representative works ==
Initial publication year shown. Many have later editions.

- Sur la colline ronde, with Jean l'Olagne (1912)
- Les vaillances, farces et aventures de Gaspard des montagnes (1922–1931, 4 vols)
- Les jardins sauvages (1923)
- Le mauvais garçon (1925)
- Dans l'herbe des trois vallées (1927)
- Ceux d'Auvergne (1928)
- La ligne verte (1929)
- Les sorciers du canton (1933)
- Monts et merveilles (1934)
- Toucher terre (1936)
- Le Secret des Compagnons (1937)
- La Porte du verger (1938)
- Georges ou les journées d'Avril (1940)
- L'Homme à la bêche (1940)
- Vent de mars (1941)
- Le Chef français (1942)
- Sully et sa grande passion (1942)
- Le Blé de Noël (1943)
- La Maison-Dieu (1944)
- La Bienheureuse Passion (1946)
- Histoire fidèle de la bête en Gévaudan (1946)
- Le Trésor des contes (1948-1962, 13 vols.)
- L'école buissonnière (1949)
- Le chasseur de la nuit (1951)
- Les Saints de France (1951)
- L'Exorciste (1954)
- Histoire des gens dans les montagnes du Centre (1959)

== Translations ==
- Mary Mian, A Treasury of French Tales, Houghton Mifflin, 1954.
- Royall Tyler, French Folktales, Pantheon, 1989 (105 tales).
- Royall Tyler, Henri Pourrat and Le Trésor des Contes, Blue-Tongue Books, 2020 (an extended introduction to Pourrat, with 81 tales).

== Bibliography ==
- Bernadette Bricout, ed. Contes et récits du Livradois: Textes recueillis par Henri Pourrat. Paris: Maisonneuve et Larose, 1989.
- Bernadette Bricout. Le Savoir et la Saveur: Henri Pourrat et Le Trésor des contes. Paris: Gallimard, 1992.
- Paul Delarue, ed. The Borzoi Book of French Folktales, tr. Austin E. Fife. New York: Alfred A. Knopf, 1956.
- Christian Faure. Littérature et société (1940-1944): la mystique vichyssoise du "Retour à la terre" selon l'oeuvre d'Henri Pourrat. Avignon: Edition régionale du Livradois-Forez, Revue archéologique Sites (Chroniques historiques d'Ambert et de son arrondissement. Hors-série, no. 11), 1988.
- Dany Hadjaj, ed. Henri Pourrat et le Trésor des Contes (Actes du colloque organisé par la Faculté des Lettres de l’Université Blaise Pascal). Cahiers Henri Pourrat 6. Clermont-Ferrand: Bibliothèque Municipale, Centre Henri Pourrat, 1988.
- Geneviève Massignon, ed. Folktales of France', tr. Jacqueline Hyland (Folktales of the World). London: Routledge & Kegan Paul, 1968.
- Françoise Morvan, ed. Contes d’Auvergne: Paul Sébillot, Henri Pourrat, Félix Remize. Éditions Ouest-France, 2011.
- Robert O Paxton. Vichy France: Old Guard and New Order, 1940-1944. New York: Knopf, 1972.
- Pierre Pupier. Henri Pourrat et la grande question. Paris: Sang de la Terre, 1999.
- Gisèle Sapiro. The French Writers’ War, 1940-1953, tr. Vanessa Doriott Anderson and Dorrit Cohn. Durham, N.C.: Duke University Press, 2014.
- Marie-Louise Ténèze. Récits & contes populaires d’Auvergne/1. Paris: Gallimard, 1978.
- Anne-Marie Thiesse. Écrire la France. Paris: Presses universitaires de France, 1991.
- Royall Tyler. Henri Pourrat and Le Trésor des Contes. Charley’s Forest, NSW: Blue-Tongue Books, 2020.
- Jack Zipes. The Brothers Grimm: From Enchanted Forests to the Modern World, New York and London: Routledge, 1988.

== Legacy ==
- In 1974-1975 Pourrat’s son and daughter founded the Centre Henri Pourrat in Clermont-Ferrand by donating to the city’s municipal and interuniversity library their father’s manuscripts, note files, correspondence (over 20,000 letters), and personal library.
- The film Gaspard des montagnes, directed by Claude Santelli, was released in 1968.
- The film Chasseur de la nuit, directed by Jacques Santamaria, was released in 1993.
- The Société des amis d'Henri Pourrat (Society of Friends of Henri Pourrat), founded in 1982, is dedicated to promoting knowledge and academic study of Pourrat’s work.
