= Kirikou and the Men and Women =

- Directed by: Michel Ocelot
- Written by: Michel Ocelot; Bénédicte Galup; Susie Morgenstern; Cendrine Maubourguet
- Produced by: Didier Brunner; Jacques Bled; Ivan Rouvreure
- Starring: Romann Berrux; Awa Sene Sarr
- Edited by: Patrick Ducruet
- Music by: Thibault Agyeman
- Production companies: Les Armateurs; Mac Guff Ligne; France 3 Cinéma; Studio O
- Distributed by: StudioCanal
- Release date: 3 October 2012
- Running time: 89 minutes
- Country: France
- Language: French
- Budget: $7.5 million
- Box office: $9.4 million

Kirikou and the Men and Women (French: Kirikou et les Hommes et les Femmes) is a 2012 French animated fantasy children's film written and directed by Michel Ocelot. The second sequel to Ocelot's 1998 film Kirikou and the Sorceress, following Kirikou and the Wild Beasts (2005), the film is an anthology, telling five tales woven together by a loose framing device.

The film was originally released on 3 October 2012. While successful at the box office, it received mixed reviews from critics.

== Synopsis ==
The third film by celebrated French animator Michel Ocelot about the exploits of the irrepressible young Kirikou, a feisty infant with a big heart, follows his adventures as he uses his wits to save his fellow villagers from a host of problems—including the threats of an evil sorceress. Told through the eyes of Kirikou’s grandfather, the Wise Man who lives in the Forbidden Mountain, the stories mix history, fable, and humor to teach important lessons about courage, self-belief, and tolerance.

== Cast ==
- Romann Berrux: Kirikou
- Awa Sene Sarr: Karaba
- Jessica Tougloh: Madela (Kirikou's mother) / The Dancer
- Pierre Poudewa: Kirikou's Grandfather
- Sabine Pakora: Monkuga (the Strong Woman) / Neutral
- Umbañ U Kset and Pascal Nzonzi: Aboulou (the Old Man)
- Jean Landruphe Diby: Apo (Kirikou's uncle) / The Fetish on the Roof / The Talking Fetishes / The Dancer
- Evelyne Pèlerin-Ngo Maa: The Griot
- Rissa Wanaghil: Anigourran
- Elika Bozorgi: The Big Girl
- Gary Mihaileanu: The Big Boy
- Antoinette Gomis: Izari (the Thin Woman)
- Eythan Solomon: The Little One / Cube
- Lola Giovanetti: Pompon

== Reception ==
=== Critical reception ===
==== In France ====
Upon its release in France on 3, Kirikou and the Men and the Women received generally positive reviews from critics. While the graphics, animation, and soundtrack were unanimously praised, there were sometimes differing opinions about Michel Ocelot's ability to renew himself in this third film focused on Kirikou.

The visual universe, animation, and music were still appreciated: Le Parisien described the film as ''an animation, graphics, and music still as enchanting'', while Ouest-France said it was ''beautiful work, accomplished and delicate. The specialized cinema magazine Positif noted that ''The rhythm, the golden colors of Kirikou's universe suit this filmmaker (Michel Ocelot) wonderfully, in an expression of fullness that warms the heart''. Ouest-France and Le Monde appreciated the use of 3D to create depth effects on several planes rather than volume, a technique already employed by the director in his previous film, Tales of the Night.

The five stories are mostly considered successful, though not without some differences of opinion. According to Noémie Luciani from Le Monde, ''in this second series of tales derived from ''Kirikou and the Sorceress'', the smallest of animated heroes is not idle, Michel Ocelot's imagination remains inexhaustible, and the result is once again a delight'', with the five stories ranging ''from musical fable to moral tale''. According to Le Parisien, ''[Kirikou's] mischief, his quick actions, but also and above all his philosophy, his wisdom, and his open-mindedness never cease to captivate the viewer, young or old'', especially since the whole ''sends beautiful messages about racism or love''. In La Croix, Arnaud Schwartz finds the five stories ''still as delightful'', with increasing intensity throughout the film and stressing the themes of welcoming the stranger and the transmission through storytelling. Some critics, however, were more skeptical: in Télérama, Cécile Mury thinks that ''even the most ardent ''Kirikou'' fan might find some rather trivial stories a bit long'', while Romain Blondeau, in Les Inrockuptibles, finds that ''Michel Ocelot chain together five generally uninspired nursery rhymes with no narrative link or sense of rhythm''.

The ability of this third installment to renew the Kirikou universe has elicited mixed reviews. The daily newspaper Le Monde is convinced. In the specialized review Les Cahiers du cinéma, Thierry Méranger judges that ''Beyond the play of masks that identifies the creator with his character, it is indeed his ability to renew a tested success that gives strength to the film.''

For 20 minutes and Ouest-France, the loss of the element of surprise does not prevent the same mixture from operating with the same effectiveness. Ouest-France, while acknowledging that the film ''works with the ingredients of its previous successes'', further notes that this return to a tried-and-true recipe could be explained by the fact that ''the filmmaker was not sufficiently followed by the audience when he wanted to turn the page with Azur and Asmar and then Tales of the Night''. Télérama mentions a ''slight feeling of weariness'' partly due to a ''sense of déjà vu'', so that ''you have to wait a bit to contemplate pure splashes of beauty''. In Première, Pamela Pianezza believes that ''If Ocelot gives in to the easy route by chaining stories rather than focusing on narrating a unique adventure (as in his superb ''Azur and Asmar''), he nevertheless confirms his exceptional storytelling talent.''

Les Inrockuptibles, on the other hand, are not convinced: ''what is especially missing here is a little novelty or risk-taking''.

==== In Belgium ====
In Belgium, Kirikou and the Men and the Women was released on 24. In Le Focus Vif, Louis Danvers gives the film four out of five stars, writing a very positive review praising the simplicity of the stories and the ''mature creativity'' they display. In Le Soir, Fabienne Bradfer argues that despite the 3D, the beauty of the graphics and the lovely humanistic message, this third film ''lacks creativity'' and succumbs to commercial easiness in Le Soir on October 24, 2012.

== Accolades ==
Year	Award	Category	Result
2013	César Award	Best Animated Film	Nominated
