= Around the World in 80 Days (2021 film) =

- Poster
- Directed by: Samuel Tourneux
- Screenplay by: Gerry Swallow; David Michel
- Based on: Around the World in Eighty Days; 1873 novel by Jules Verne
- Produced by: Zoé Carrera Allaix; Cécile Lauritano; David Michel
- Edited by: Benjamin Massoubre
- Music by: Norbert Gilbert
- Production company: Cottonwood Media
- Distributed by: StudioCanal
- Release date: 4 August 2021
- Running time: 82 minutes
- Countries: France; Belgium
- Language: French
- Budget: $20 million
- Box office: $3.987 million

Around the World in 80 Days (French: Le Tour du monde en 80 jours) is a 2021 French-language animated adventure comedy film based on Jules Verne's 1873 novel of the same name. Directed by Samuel Tourneux (in his feature directorial debut) from a screenplay by Gerry Swallow and David Michel (who also acted as an executive producer), the film was produced by Cottonwood Media and distributed by StudioCanal. Around the World in 80 Days was released in France on 4 August 2021, and had a worldwide gross of $3.987 million. Grossing €3.7 million ($4,375,990) from 762,917 admissions, it was the highest-grossing French-language film in foreign markets of 2021.

== Premise ==
Passepartout, a naive but well-spirited marmoset, dreams of circumnavigating the world in eighty days, however his over-protective mother does not allow him to go on the journey. One day, Passepartout gets the opportunity to travel the world with Phileas Frog, an explorer and con artist, after Frog makes a wager with the locals that he can circumnavigate the globe in under eighty days.

== Voice cast ==
The original French voice cast is as follows:

- Damien Frette as Phileas Frog
- Julien Crampon as Jean Passepartout
- Kaycie Chase as Aouda
- Céline Ronte as Fix
- Véronique Augereau as Passepartout's mother
- Emmanuel Garijo as Herman
- Gabriel Le Doze as Juan Frog de Leon
- Serge Biavan as scorpion leader
- Mickaël Aragones as a scorpion
- Grégory Quidel as scorpion beta

=== English dub ===
- Rob Tinkler as Phileas Frog
- Cory Doran as Jean Passepartout. Raphael Alejandro voices him in the American dub.
- Katie Griffin as Aouda. Madi Monroe voices her in the American dub.
- Heather Bambrick as Fix. Aida Rodriguez voices her in the American dub.
- Shoshana Sperling as Passepartout's mother. Gwen La Roka voices her in the American dub.
- Brandon McGibbon as Herman
- Juan Chioran as Juan Frog de Leon
- Jamie Watson as scorpion leader
- Deven Mack as a scorpion

== Production ==
Director Samuel Tourneux and producers David Michel and Zoé Carrera Allaix first began discussing the project in 2016. The film was screened to distributors at Cannes Film Festival in May 2019 under the working title Around the World. Tourneux explained at Cannes that, while a 3D-CGI film, he wanted to combine it with 2D visual effects, such as water and smoke, to give it a distinctive style from other animated films. Tourneux also noted that he wanted to combine steampunk elements with an animal world built by animals, and as such the animals in the film have managed to build machines out of materials such as wood, leaves, shells, rocks and sand.

Over 17,000 drawings were made for the storyboard, of which 9,300 were used in the final version.

== Release ==
Around the World in 80 Days was released in France on 4 August 2021, and in the United Kingdom on 20 August.

=== Box office ===
During its entire theatrical run, Around the World in 80 Days had a worldwide gross of $3,987,613 (excluding Africa), including $164,477 in the United Kingdom. It grossed €3.7 million ($4,375,990) from 762,917 admissions in 2021 from approximately forty countries, making it the highest-grossing French-language film in foreign markets of the year. During the film's first month, it grossed €446,273 ($527,807.08) from 53,740 admissions in three countries. In September, Around the World in 80 Days grossed an additional €1,552,714 ($1,836,394.85) from 411,151 admissions in ten countries; €738,315 ($873,205.15) from 118,523 admissions in October; €148,607 ($175,757.5) from 15,045 admissions in eight countries in November, and; €387,005 ($457,710.81) from 83,061 admissions in seven countries in December.

=== Critical reception ===
Olivier Bachelard, writing for Abus de Ciné, gave the film three out of five stars, praising the animation style and 2D elements, but criticised the animal adaptations of human society (as such using clams as currency) as uninventive. Leslie Felperin of The Guardian also gave the film three out of five stars, calling it "modest" and adding "it's hard to hate on this gentle, goofy interpretation, populated by simply designed animal characters with exaggerated features."

=== Awards ===
Award	Date	Category	Nominee	Result	Ref
Lumière Awards	17 January 2022	Best Animated Film	Samuel Tourneux	Nominated	
Trophées du Film français	1 February 2022	UniFrance Trophy	Around the World in 80 Days	Won	
