= Azur & Asmar: The Princes' Quest =

Azur et Asmar
- Original French theatrical film release poster
- Directed by: Michel Ocelot
- Written by: Michel Ocelot
- Produced by: Christophe Rossignon
- Starring: Cyril Mourali; Karim M'Riba; Hiam Abbass; Patrick Timsit
- Edited by: Michèle Péju
- Music by: Gabriel Yared
- Production companies: Nord-Ouest Production; Mac Guff Ligne; Studio O France 3 Cinema; Rhóne-Alpes Cinema; Artemis Productions; Lucky Red; Zahori Media; Intuitions Films
- Distributed by: Diaphana (France); Lucky Red (Italy)
- Release dates: May 21, 2006 (Directors' Fortnight); October 25, 2006 (France)
- Running time: 99 minutes
- Countries: France; Belgium; Spain; Italy
- Language: French
- Budget: €9,000,000 (estimated)
- Box office: $11,939,023

Azur & Asmar: The Princes' Quest (French: Azur et Asmar) is a 2006 animated fairytale fantasy film written and directed by Michel Ocelot and animated at the Paris animation and visual effects studio Mac Guff Ligne. It was released in theaters in North America as just Azur & Asmar.

An international co-production between France, Belgium, Italy and Spain, it is Ocelot's fourth feature, though his first wholly original creation since Kirikou and the Sorceress, and his first use of 3D computer graphics, albeit an atypical employment of this medium with two-dimensional, painted backgrounds and non-photorealistic rendering. Like most of his films, it is an original fairy tale, in this case, inspired by the folklore (such as the One Thousand and One Nights) and decorative art of Maghreb, Algeria and Morocco and with an increased degree of characterisation relative to his previous works which push it into the genre of fairytale fantasy.

The original-language version of the film has significant amounts of dialogue in both French and Arabic; however, the Arabic was not subtitled in the original French theatrical release and is not intended to be subtitled nor replaced for any other audiences.

== Plot ==
Once upon a time, there were two children nursed by Jénane: Azur, a blond, blue-eyed son of a nobleman, and Asmar, the tan-skinned and dark-eyed child of Jénane. The nurse tells them the story of the Djinn-fairy waiting to be freed from her prison by a good and heroic prince. Brought up together, the two boys are as close as brothers until the day Azur's father cruelly separates them, banishing his nurse and Asmar from his home and sending Azur away to receive schooling from a personal tutor. Years later, Azur is haunted by memories of the legendary Djinn-fairy and takes it upon himself to journey all the way to Asmar's homeland to seek her out and marry her. Now reunited, he finds that Jénane has since become a successful and rich merchant, while Asmar is now a member of the Royal Guard. However, Asmar and Azur's separation has damaged their bond and Asmar also longs to find and marry the Djinn-fairy. They must learn to work together and get along again, but only one of the two princes can be successful in his quest.

== Cast ==
Character	Original Actor	Dub Actor
Azur	Cyril Mourali	Steven Kynman
Azur	Rayan Mahjoub (young)	Leopold Benedict (young)
Asmar	Karim M'Riba	Nigel Pilkington
Asmar	Abdelsselem Ben Amar (young)	Freddie Benedict (young)
Jénane	Hiam Abbass	Suzanna Nour
Crapoux	Patrick Timsit	Nigel Lambert
Princess Chamsous Sabah	Fatma Ben Khell	Imogen Bailey
The Djinn Fairy	Thissa d'Avila Bensalah	Emma Tate
The Elf Fairy	Sofia Boutella	Suzanne David
Wise Man Yadoa	Olivier Claverie	Sean Barrett
The Father	Jacques Pater	Keith Wickham

== Production ==
=== Direction ===
==== Inspiration ====
Michel Ocelot conceived his film as a ''celebration of the Maghreb and Islamic civilization in the Middle Ages''. Having cherished memories of a trip to Algeria during his adolescence, he visited the ''three countries of the Maghreb to sketch the scenery for his film''. The city of Timgad particularly marked him. From another trip in 2001, the Bastion 23 and the Bardo Museum in Algiers inspired him a "beautiful Moorish dwelling."

For the characters’ costumes, Ocelot particularly researched using a book about Algerian costume and those seen in the Bardo Museum. The women in the film wear Berber outfits, and the headdress of the Djinn Fairy is inspired by a headdress preserved in the Bardo Museum in Algiers Algeria.

The journey of Azur and Asmar to the land across the sea is a means of evoking the theme of immigration and the difficulty of being an immigrant. This is why the dialogues in Arabic in the film are neither dubbed nor subtitled: ''One of the problems of the immigrant is also not understanding or being understood''. As Michel Ocelot explains in the DVD supplements of the film, Crapoux is the character who represents the director's difficulty in integrating when he arrived in France in the 1950s.

==== Design ====
The film is entirely created using computer animation.

Concerned with maintaining the authenticity of the Arabic language, Ocelot enlisted Hiam Abbass, a Palestinian screenwriter, director, and author, to verify the dialogues. Hiam Abbass also provided the voice for the mother and nurse character of Azur and Asmar.

The Song of Azur and Asmar (adapted into French by Philippe Latger and Michel Ocelot) was written and performed by Souad Massi, an Algerian singer of Kabyle ethnic origin.

=== Financing ===
To produce and complete Azur and Asmar, the production company Nord-Ouest Production led by producers Christophe Rossignon and Philip Boëffard gathered ten million euros, including one million euros in the form of a tax credit granted by the French Ministry of Finance because the film was made in France.

This amount, larger than that for a live-action feature film, explains the significant number of financiers listed in the opening credits: two television channels (France 3 and Canal+), the regions of Île-de-France and Rhône-Alpes, the distributor for theaters and DVDs Diaphana, as well as various co-producers and European institutions.

These contributions were supplemented by pre-sales for the film's release in 35 countries signed after the world premiere at the 2006 Cannes Film Festival, where the film was presented during the Quinzaine des Réalisateurs. In Japan, the film was distributed by Studio Ghibli.

== Release ==
Azur & Asmar premièred on 21 May 2006 as part of the Directors' Fortnight of the 2006 Cannes Film Festival and was released to French theatres nationwide on 25 October 2006.

An English-subtitled version was shown at numerous film festivals including the Montreal Film Festival for Children and Sprockets Toronto International Film Festival for Children – in both cases winning the festival's audience award. At the World Festival of Animated Film Zagreb - Animafest Zagreb the film won the Grand Prix - Best Feature Film award in 2007.

In Germany, Michel Ocelot was offered to dub all the dialogues into German, while a large part of the work had been done in Classical Arabic in the original version. Michel Ocelot preferred to forgo a major German distributor for a smaller one rather than mutilate his work.

The film was subsequently dubbed into English and distributed in the United Kingdom and Ireland by Soda Pictures (now known as Thunderbird Releasing) under the expanded title Azur & Asmar: The Princes' Quest, receiving a limited release which began on 8 February 2008 and lasted several months, most likely due to the small number of dubbed prints made (as of 27 June 2008, it was still showing at one cinema in Cleethorpes). It was rated U by the British Board of Film Classification for "mild fantasy violence"

=== North America ===
The film had difficulty finding a distributor in the United States due to the breastfeeding scene between Jenane and the two babies at the beginning of the film, with American distributors considering the exposure of breasts to be obscene.

The film was licensed for distribution in the United States by the Weinstein Company on 13 February 2007, during the European Film Market at the Berlin International Film Festival. However, as of September 2008 – over a year later – no plans to release the film in the United States had been announced. Similarly, Seville Pictures announced that they would distribute the film to both English and French speakers in Canada, but as September 2008 they have only released a DVD with only the original French dialogue and no English subtitles. Some commentators had theorised that a United States release would be impossible due to Jénane's nipples being visible during a breastfeeding scene early in the film (Kirikou and the Sorceress went unrated to avoid the PG-13 or higher rating it would have received from the Motion Picture Association of America despite the similarly non-sexual nature of the nudity in that film) and the director's refusal to allow his films to be distributed in a censored version; the Weinsteins' apparent dropping of the title seemed attributable to this. However, in early September 2008 it was revealed to have been submitted to the MPAA by Genius Products (a home media distributor then co-owned the Weinstein Company) and received only a PG rating for "thematic material, some mild action and peril," with no explicit reference made to the nudity.

The British-dubbed version had its American première at IFC Center in New York City on 17 October 2008, and was distributed in theatres by GKIDS in collaboration with the Weinstein Company and under the shorter title of just Azur & Asmar. It was originally planned to run for one week in New York, before touring to other cities. However, due to the success of the first week (all screenings were sold out) its residency was extended for a second week of screenings. When these too sold out, a "third and final" week was announced. Cities it had toured to included Chicago, Columbus, Tucson, Hartford, Seattle, and Washington, D.C. The film screened at the San Joaquin Children's Film Festival, in Stockton, California from January 16 to 18, 2009.

=== Home media ===
In the United Kingdom and Ireland, Soda Pictures followed their theatrical release with a region 2 DVD-Video release on 28 July 2008. Unlike the theatrical release, this DVD includes the French- and Arabic-language versions with English subtitles for the French as well as the English dub.Azur and Asmar - The Princes Quest

The Japanese region 2 DVD and region A Blu-ray Disc was released on 19 December 2007, the South Korean region 3 DVD released on 17 July 2008 and all regional Blu-ray Discs released on January 29, 2014 all include English subtitles.

As of February 2019, the film is not available in high definition with English subtitles or the English dub on Blu-ray Disc, download or streaming in the United Kingdom, Ireland, or the United States. However, it can be seen with English subtitles with either of the Japanese or South Korean Blu-ray Disc releases.

== Video game ==
A platform game was released for the PlayStation 2 and Microsoft Windows, and was developed by OUAT Entertainment and Wizarbox SARL, and published by EMME Interactive.

== Soundtrack ==
Music is by Lebanese-born composer Gabriel Yared with the exception of one short song composed and performed by Afida Tahri; Souad Massi an Algerian singer of kabylian ethnicity contributes vocals and lyrics to the Yared-composed ending theme "La Chanson d'Azur et Asmar". The score was nominated for the César Award for Best Music Written for a Film at the César Awards 2007.
