= Michel Ocelot =

French writer and director (born 1943)

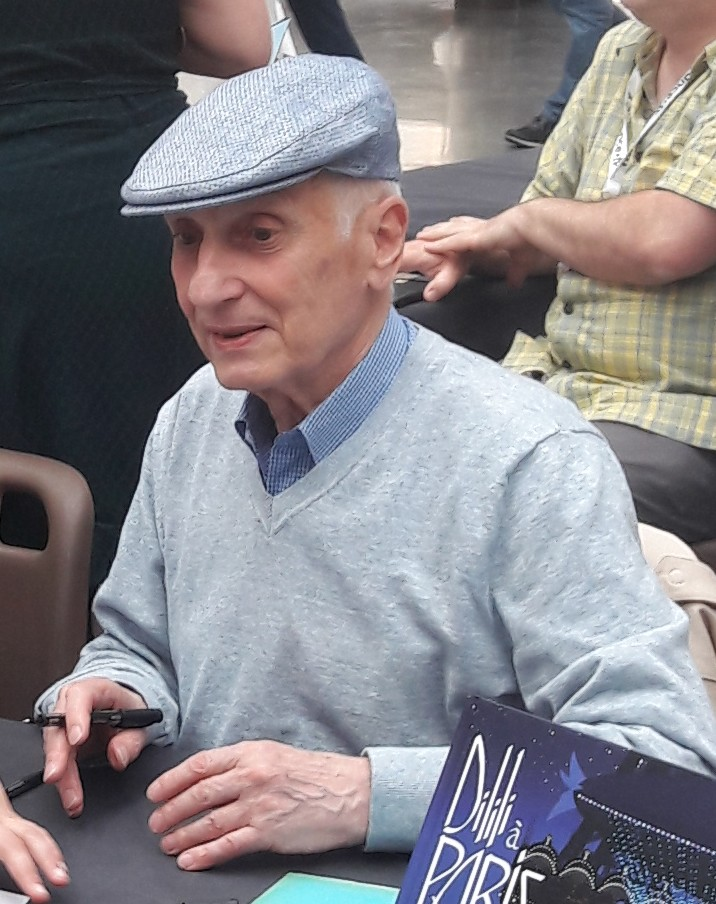
- Ocelot in 2019
- Born: 27 October 1943 (age 82); Villefranche-sur-Mer, French Riviera, France
- Education: Ecole régionale des Beaux-Arts, Angers; École nationale supérieure des arts décoratifs, Paris; California Institute of the Arts, Los Angeles
- Title: President of ASIFA
- Term: 1994–1999
- Predecessor: Raoul Servais
- Awards: Chevalier of the Légion d'honneur

Michel Ocelot (French: [miʃɛl ɔslo]; born 27 October 1943) is a French screenwriter, designer, storyboard artist and director of animated films and television programs (formerly also animator, background artist, narrator and other roles in earlier works) and a former president of the International Animated Film Association. Though best known for his 1998 debut feature Kirikou and the Sorceress, his earlier films and television work had already won Césars and British Academy Film Awards among others and he was made a chevalier of the Légion d'honneur on 23 October 2009, presented to him by Agnès Varda who had been promoted to commandeur earlier the same year. In 2015 he got the Lifetime Achievement Award at the World Festival of Animated Film – Animafest Zagreb.

== Biography ==
=== Education and short films (1980s) ===
He was born in 1943 to a Catholic family then in Villefranche-sur-Mer, on the French Riviera, who relocated to Guinea, West Africa for much of his childhood, moving back to Anjou in France during his adolescence. As a teenager he played with and created toy theatre productions and was inspired to become an animator through viewing Hermína Týrlová's Vzpoura hraček (The Revolt of Toys, 1946) and discovering a book on DIY stop motion animation. He was never formally taught animation, however, and instead studied the decorative arts, first at the Ecole régionale des Beaux-Arts in Angers, then the École nationale supérieure des arts décoratifs in Paris and the California Institute of the Arts in Los Angeles. He now lives and operates from an atelier-apartment in Paris.

In 1976, he created the series The Adventures of Gédéon (based on Benjamin Rabier), then his first professionally produced short film, The Three Inventors, was produced in 1979 by AAA (which also produced Jacques Rouxel, the creator of the Shadoks). He received an award at the BAFTA that same year for this film in London.

In 1983, he won the César Award for Best Animated Short Film for The Legend of the Poor Hunchback, also produced by AAA.

=== Feature films and success (1990s–2000s) ===
In 1994, Michel Ocelot was elected president of the International Animated Film Association (ASIFA) for two terms.

His œuvre is characterised by having worked in a variety of animation techniques, typically employing a different medium for each new project, but almost exclusively within the genres of fairy tales and fairytale fantasy. Some, such as Kirikou and the Sorceress, are loose adaptations of existing folk tales, others are original stories constructed from the "building blocks" of such tales. He describes the process as "I play with balls that innumerable jugglers have already used for countless centuries. These balls, passed down from hand to hand, are not new. But today I'm the one doing the juggling." Visually, they are characterised by a rigid use, excepting brief transitions between them, of the side-on, straight-on and ¾ viewpoints TF1 INFO – Actualités du jour en direct : Actualité en France et à l'International of silhouette and cutout animation (such as that of Lotte Reiniger and Karel Zeman) even when working in mediums which allow for greater flexibility and dynamic viewpoints. Though often likened to Reiniger, he himself finds her films "rather archaic and not very attractive" and does not list them among his favourites. He also admires the art of ancient Egypt, pottery of ancient Greece, Hokusai and illustrators such as Arthur Rackham, W. Heath Robinson and his brothers and, most of all, Aubrey Beardsley. He was president of the Association international du film d'animation (ASIFA) from 1994 to 2000.

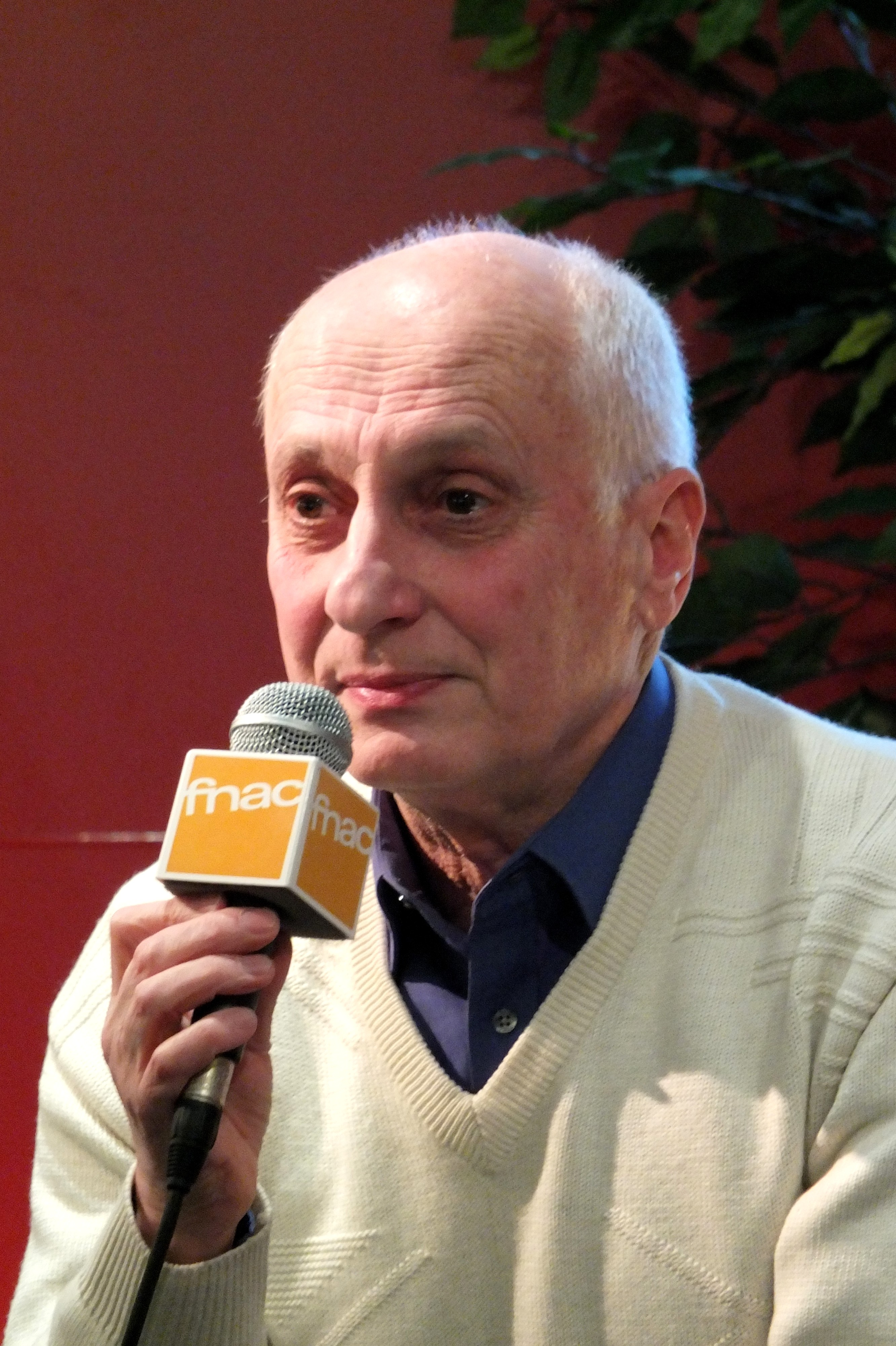
The filmmaker in Paris promoting the video release of Kirikou and the Wild Beasts

To celebrate "World Animation Day," Michel Ocelot participated on 28 in a special day on animation techniques at the Forum des Images, in Paris, to conclude the "Animation Film Festival". He demonstrated the simplicity of his techniques live.

While already a household name in much of continental Europe, and greatly respected by Studio Ghibli's Isao Takahata (who directed Japanese dubs of his films), his success in the more conservative markets of the United Kingdom, United States and Germany has been restricted by a mixed reaction to the realistic and non-sexual, but nevertheless omnipresent nudity in his breakout film Kirikou and the Sorceress. Although all of these countries' boards of film classification have approved it as being suitable for all ages, cinemas and TV channels have been reluctant to show it due to the possible backlash from offended parents. In 2007, he gained some further recognition within the English-speaking world by directing a music video for the Icelandic musician Björk, the lead single from her album Volta.

In another 2008 interview he mentioned as further examples of favourite and influential artistic works Voltaire's letters, The Heron and the Crane, Crac, Father and Daughter, the first part of Grand Illusion, Neighbors, the Eiffel Tower, Millesgården, Persian miniatures, Jean Giraud's free drawing and illustrations by Kay Nielsen.

=== Recognition (2010s) ===
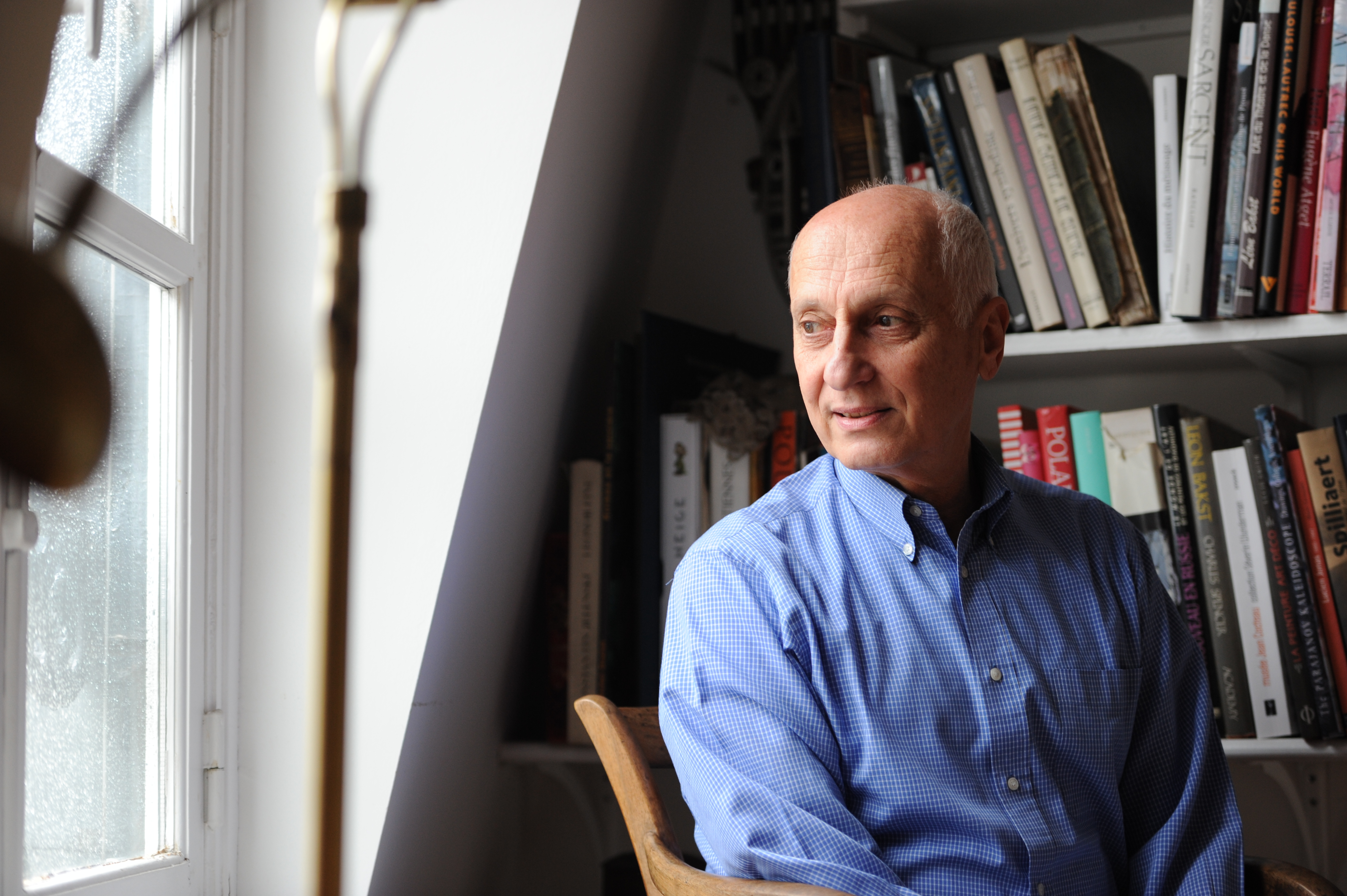
Michel Ocelot at his Paris home on 24 September 2012.

In 2008, he was awarded an international prize, the Klingsor Award (for his entire body of work) at the Bratislava Animation Biennale (BAB).

Two years later, he created the animated fantasy series Dragons and Princesses for the television channel Canal+ Family, which employs the cut-out paper technique from Princes and Princesses. The following year, he adapted these 10 episodes into a feature film titled Tales of the Night. The film attracted only about 500000 amissions but received several nominations at the 2011 Berlinale. In addition, the Henri-Langlois Prize for Animated Film and Moving Image was awarded to him in that same year for his entire body of work.

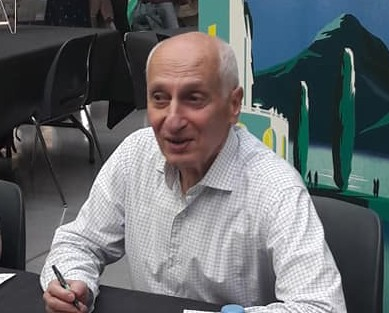
Michel Ocelot at the Annecy International Animation Film Festival 2018 for the premiere of Dilili in Paris.

The following year, he concluded his trilogy with Kirikou and the Men and Women. As the title suggests, this time the author focuses on telling stories of villagers rather than animals, as in the second installment. Technically, the filmmaker complemented 2D animation with 3D cinema technology. This project was originally conceived as a six-episode animated series for France Télévisions.

At the end of 2018, he unveiled his fifth animated feature, Dilili in Paris, which tells the adventures of a young Franco-Kanak girl in Paris during the Belle Époque. While the filmmaker has fun depicting a visually imagined Paris, with the heroine encountering prominent figures of the time, he also confronts serious and realistic themes, discussing colonialism and racism. The film gathered more than 600000 viewers and won the César Award for Best Animated Feature in 2019.

== Filmography ==
Year	Title (English)	Format	Medium	Other notes
1974	Le Tabac (lit. "The Newsagent")	1 min short film		
1976	Gideon (Gédéon)	60 × 5 min TV series	Cut-out animation	Based on the comics by Benjamin Rabier
1979	Les 3 Inventeurs (lit. "The Three Inventors")	13 min short film	Cut-out animation	Best animated short at the 34th British Academy Film Awards, 1980Zagreb World Festival of Animated Films and 1981 Odense Film Festival (tied with Crac !); Extract featured in the "Globe Trotting" segment of the 2003 documentary The Animated Century
1981	Daughters of Equality (Les Filles de l'égalité)	1 min short film	Traditional animation	Special jury prize at the 1982 Albi Film Festival
1982	Beyond Oil	20 min educational film	Cut-out animation	Animated segments only; live action directed by Philippe Vallois Full transfer available on YouTube from production company aaa
1982	The Legend of the Poor Hunchback (La Légende du pauvre bossu)	7 min short film	Animatic	Best animated short at the 8th César Awards
1983	La Princesse insensible (lit. "The Impassive Princess")	13 × 4 min TV series	Mixed	
1987	Les Quatre Vœux du Vilain et de sa femme (lit. "The Four Wishes of Vilain and of His Wife")	5 min short film	Traditional animation	Featured in the 1989 package film Outrageous Animation compiled and distributed in cinemas and on home video in North America by Expanded Cinema
1989	Ciné si	8 × 12 min TV series	Mixed silhouette animation	Best TV series episode at the 1990 Ottawa International Animation Festival and 1991 Annecy Festival 1991; Compiled into Princes and Princesses
1992	Les Contes de la nuit (lit. "Tales of the Night")	26 min TV special	Mixed silhouette animation	Contains "La Belle Fille et le sorcier" (lit. "The Beautiful Girl and the Sorcerer"), "Bergère qui danse" (lit. "The Dancing Shepherdess") and "Le Prince des joyaux" (lit. "The Prince of Gems")
1998	Kirikou and the Sorceress (Kirikou et la Sorcière)	71 min feature film	Digital traditional animation	Best animated feature at the 1999 Annecy Festival; best European feature at the 2002 British Animation Awards (tied with Chicken Run)
2000	Princes and Princesses (Princes et Princesses)	70 min feature film	Mixed silhouette animation	Compilation movie of Ciné si
2005	Kirikou and the Wild Beasts (Kirikou et les Bêtes sauvages)	75 min feature film	Digital traditional animation	Co-directed with Bénédicte Galup
2006	Azur & Asmar (Azur et Asmar, aka Azur & Asmar: The Princes' Quest)	90 min feature film	Computer animation	Best animated feature at the 2007 Zagreb World Festival of Animated Films; Also serves as voice director for the English version
2007	"Earth Intruders"	4 min music video for Björk	Mixed live action and animation	Nominated for best video at the 2007 Q Awards
2007	Kirikou et Karaba (lit. "Kirikou and Karaba")	Play	Musical theatre	
2008	L'Invité aux noces (lit. "The Wedding Guest")	Original video short	Animatic	
2010	Dragons et Princesses (lit. "Dragons and Princesses")	10 × 13 min TV series for Canal+	Computer silhouette animation	Special award for a TV series at the 2010 Annecy Festival; Compiled into Tales of the Night (2011) and Ivan Tsarevitch and the Changing Princess
2011	Tales of the Night (Les Contes de la nuit)	84 min feature film	Computer silhouette animation	Compilation movie of Dragons et Princesses; Premiered in competition for the Golden Bear at the 61st Berlin International Film Festival; played in competition at the 2011 Sitges Film Festival
2012	Kirikou and the Men and Women (Kirikou et les Hommes et les Femmes)	88 min feature film	Computer animation	
2016	Ivan Tsarevitch and the Changing Princess (Ivan Tsarévitch et la Princesse Changeante, aka Ivan Tsarevitch and the Changing Princess: Four Enchanting Tales)	53 min feature film	Computer silhouette animation	Compilation movie of Dragons et Princesses
2018	Dilili in Paris (Dilili à Paris)	Feature film	Computer animation	
2022	Le Pharaon, le Sauvage et la Princesse	Feature film	Computer animation	

== Distinctions ==
=== Awards ===
- BAFTA 1981: BAFTA Award for Best Animated Film for The Three Inventors
- Festival of Albi 1981: Special Jury Prize for The Daughters of Equality
- César 1983: César Award for Best Animated Short Film for The Legend of the Poor Hunchback
- Bratislava Animation Biennial 2008: Klingsor Prize for lifetime achievement
- Henri Langlois Prize 2011 in the category of Animated Film and Moving Image, for lifetime achievement
- César 2019: César Award for Best Animated Film for Dilili in Paris
- Annecy International Animation Film Festival 2022: Honorary Crystal

=== Decorations ===
- Decor: Commander of the Order of Arts and Letters: Promoted to the rank of commander by decree on 25 September 2017.
- Decor: Knight of the Legion of Honor: Elevated to the rank of knight by decree on 10 April 2009 in recognition of his 33 years of artistic activity.
