= History of French animation =

The history of French animation is one of the longest in the world, as France has created some of the earliest animated films dating back to the late 19th century, and invented many of the foundational technologies of early animation.

The first pictured movie was from Frenchman Émile Reynaud, who created the praxinoscope, an advanced successor to the zoetrope that could project animated films up to 16 frames long, and films of about 500~600 pictures, projected on its own Théâtre Optique at Musée Grévin in Paris, France, on 28 October 1892.

Émile Cohl created what is most likely the first real animated cartoon to be drawn on paper, Fantasmagorie in 1908. The film featured many morphing figures. He is also thought to have pioneered puppet animation in 1910, pixilation in 1911 and to have started the first animated series in 1916 with La journée de Flambeau (also known as Flambeau, chien perdu).

== Other notable French animations ==
Une Nuit sur le Mont Chauve (Night on Bald Mountain), 1933, directed by Alexander Alexeieff and Claire Parker. Animated entirely using the pinscreen apparatus, a device invented by Alexieff and Parker that gives the impression of animated engravings.

Le Roman de Renart (The Tale of the Fox), 1930/1937, directed by Ladislas Starevich. The first French animated feature film. The animation was finished in 1930 but a soundtrack was only added in 1937, and it was a German one. A French-language version was released in 1941.

La Demoiselle et le violoncelliste (The Girl and the Cellist), 1965, directed by Jean-François Laguionie. Laguionie's first film, which won the Annecy Grand Prix in 1965.

1967 saw the release of Astérix le Gaulois (Asterix the Gaul), directed by Ray Goossens. This was the first movie based on the long-running Asterix comics; it was made without the knowledge of the comics' creators René Goscinny and Albert Uderzo, and is not widely liked by fans. The following year (1968), Goscinny and Uderzo worked with co-director Lee Payant on a sequel, Astérix et Cléopâtre (Asterix and Cleopatra).

René Laloux's first feature film La Planète sauvage (The Savage Planet, 1973), a cutout animation science fantasy that was animated in Czechoslovakia, which won the Grand Prix at the 1973 Cannes Film Festival. Laloux went on to direct two other features; Les Maîtres du temps (1982, a collaboration with the famed French comics artist Mœbius animated in Hungary) and Gandahar (1988, animated in North Korea).

Le Roi et l'oiseau (The King and the Mockingbird), 1980, directed by Paul Grimault. Begun in 1948 as The Sheperdess and the Chimney Sweep; cited by the Japanese directors Hayao Miyazaki and Isao Takahata as an influence. Originally produced in 1948, it had a production time of over 30 years, making it one of the longest production periods in history.

Quarxs 1989–1993 by Maurice Benayoun and François Schuiten, was one of the earliest computer-animated series and the first one produced in HD. Widely broadcast and awarded, Quarxs opened the path to 3D animated series on TV.

Les Aventures de Tintin (The Adventures of Tintin), began 1990, directed by Stéphane Bernasconi. TV series based on the famous Belgian comic of the same name.

Kirikou et la sorcière (Kirikou and the Sorceress), 1998, directed by Michel Ocelot. Critically acclaimed movie based on a West African folktale; the Japanese dub was written by Isao Takahata and released by Studio Ghibli. Azur & Asmar: The Princes' Quest, by the same director and co-produced in Italy, Belgium and Spain, was nominated for a Goya Award for Best Animated Film, its score was nominated for the César Award for Best Music Written for a Film at the César Awards 2007 and it won the best animated feature at the Zagreb World Festival of Animated Films 2007.

Les Triplettes de Belleville (The Triplets of Belleville), 2003, directed by Sylvain Chomet was nominated for two Academy Awards – Best Animated Feature and Best Original Song for "Belleville Rendez-vous" in 2004. Another movie of Chomet, The Illusionist, was nominated for the Academy Award for Best Animated Feature in 2011 (it was also nominated for a Golden Globe Award for Best Animated Feature Film).

Kaena: La prophétie (Kaena: The Prophecy), 2003, directed by Chris Delaporte and Pascal Pinon. A CGI fantasy movie co-produced with Canada. It was both critical and commercial failure.

Totally Spies, began 2001, created by Vincent Chalvon-Demersay and David Michel. TV series co-produced with the USA; one of French animation's biggest hits Stateside.

Persepolis, directed by Marjane Satrapi, was released in 2007 and was nominated for an Academy Award for Best Animated Feature at the 80th Academy Awards (it was also nominated for a BAFTA Award for Best Animated Film).

A Cat in Paris, directed by Alain Gagnol and Jean-Loup Felicioli, was nominated for an Academy Award for Best Animated Feature at the 84th Academy Awards.

The Little Prince is actually the most successful French and Italian animated film.

=== Films from the 1930s to the 1960s ===
- 1937 : Le Roman de Renard – by Ladislas Starevitch – (France/Germany)
- 1949 : Alice au pays des merveilles – by Lou Bunin – (United Kingdom/France)
- 1950 : Jeannot l'intrépide – by Jean Image – (France)
- 1952 : La Bergère et le ramoneur – by Paul Grimault – (France)
- 1953 : Bonjour Paris – by Jean Image – (France)
- 1956 : La Création du monde (Stvorení sveta) – (France/Czechoslovakia)
- 1956 : Une fée... pas comme les autres – (Italy/France)
- 1965 : La Demoiselle et le Violoncelliste – by Jean-François Laguionie
- 1967 : Astérix le Gaulois – (France/Belgium)
- 1967 : Le Théâtre de Monsieur et Madame Kabal – by Walerian Borowczyk – (France)
- 1968 : Astérix et Cléopâtre – by René Goscinny and Albert Uderzo – (France)
- 1969 : Tintin et le temple du soleil – by Eddie Lateste – (France/Belgium/Switzerland)

=== Films of the 1970s ===
- 1970 : Aladin et la lampe merveilleuse – by Jean Image – (France)
- 1970 : Fablio le magicien – by Georges de La Grandière, Attila Dargay, Radka Badcharova and Victor Antonescu
- 1970 : Pollux et le chat bleu – by Serge Danot – (United Kingdom/France)
- 1971 : Daisy Town – by René Goscinny – (Belgium/France)
- 1972 : Tintin et le lac aux requins – by Raymond Leblanc – (Belgium/France)
- 1973 : Joe le petit boum-boum – by Jean Image
- 1973 : La Planète sauvage – by René Laloux – (Czechoslovakia/France)
- 1974 : La Genèse – by Pierre Alibert
- 1974 : Around the World with Peynet's Lovers – by Cesare Perfetto – (Italy/France)
- 1975 : La Honte de la jungle – by Picha and Boris Szulzinger – (France/Belgium)
- 1976 : Les Douze travaux d'Astérix – by René Goscinny and Albert Uderzo – (France/Belgium)
- 1978 : La Ballade des Dalton – by Morris and René Goscinny – (France)
- 1979 : Les Fabuleuses aventures du légendaire Baron de Munchausen – by Jean Image
- 1979 : Pluk, naufragé de l'espace – by Jean Image – (France)
- 1979 : Ubu et la grande gidouille – by Jan Lenica – (France)

=== Films of the 1980s ===
- 1980 : Le Chaînon manquant – by Picha – (France/Belgium)
- 1980 : Le Roi et l'Oiseau – by Paul Grimault – (France)
- 1981 : Minoïe – by Jean Jabely and Philippe Landrot
- 1982 : Les Maîtres du temps – by René Laloux – (France/West Germany/Switzerland/United Kingdom/Hungary)
- 1983 : L'Enfant invisible – by André Lindon
- 1983 : Lucky Luke: The Daltons on the Loose – by Morris, William Hanna, Joseph Barbera – (France/United Kingdom)
- 1983 : Revenge of the Humanoids – by Albert Barillé – (France)
- 1983 : Le Secret des Sélénites – by Jean Image
- 1984 : Gwen, le livre de sable – by Jean-François Laguionie – (France)
- 1985 : Astérix et la Surprise de César – by Paul Brizzi and Gaëtan Brizzi – (France/Belgium)
- 1986 : Astérix chez les Bretons – by Pino van Lamsweerde – (France/Belgium)
- 1987 : Le Big Bang – by Picha – (France/Belgium)
- 1988 : Gandahar – by René Laloux – (France)
- 1988 : La Table tournante – by Paul Grimault
- 1989 : Astérix et le coup du menhir – by Philippe Grimond – (France/West Germany)
- 1989 : Le Triomphe de Babar – by Alan Bunce – (Canada/France)

=== Films of the 1990s ===
- 1991 : Robinson et compagnie – by Jacques Colombat – (France)
- 1993 : Les Mille et une farces de Pif et Hercule – by Bruno Desraisses and Charles by Latour – (France)
- 1995 : Le monde est un grand Chelm – by Albert Hanan Kaminski – (France/Germany/Hungary)
- 1996 : Les Boulugres – by Jean Hurtado – Finished in 1984, the film was finally released in 1996 – (France)
- 1996 : Nanook - Le grand combat – by Gérald Fleury – (France/Canada)
- 1998 : Kirikou et la Sorcière – by Michel Ocelot – (France/Belgium/Luxembourg)
- 1999 : Babar, roi des éléphants – by Raymond Jafelice – (Canada/France/Germany)
- 1999 : Carnival – by Deane Taylor – (Ireland/France)
- 1999 : Le Château des singes – by Jean-François Laguionie – (France/United Kingdom/Germany)

=== Films of the 2000s ===
- 2000 : Princes et princesses – by Michel Ocelot – (France)
- 2001 : Bécassine, le trésor viking – by Philippe Vidal – (France)
- 2001 : Petit Potam – by Christian Choquet and Bernard Deyriès – (France)
- 2002 : Corto Maltese : La cour secrète des Arcanes – by Pascal Morelli – (France/Italy/Luxembourg)
- 2002 : L'Enfant qui voulait être un ours – by Jannick Astrup – (Denmark/France)
- 2002 : Tristan and Iseut – by Thierry Schiel
- 2003 : Le Chien, le Général et les Oiseaux – by Francis Nielsen – (Italy/France)
- 2003 : Les Enfants de la pluie – by Philippe Leclerc – (France/South Korea)
- 2003 : Kaena, la prophétie – by Chris Delaporte and Pascal Pinon – (France/Canada)
- 2003 : La Légende de Parva – by Jean Cubaud – (France/Italy)
- 2003 : La Prophétie des grenouilles – by Jacques-Rémy Girerd – (France)
- 2003 : Interstella 5555: The 5tory of the 5ecret 5tar 5ystem – by Katsuhisa Takenouchi – (France/Japan)
- 2003 : The Triplets of Belleville (Les Triplettes de Belleville) – by Sylvain Chomet – (France/Belgium/Canada/United Kingdom)
- 2003 : Les Trois rois mages – by Antonio Navarro (France/Spain)
- 2004 : Les Aventures extraordinaires de Michel Strogoff – by Bruno-René Huchez – (France)
- 2004 : L'Île de Black Mór – by Jean-François Laguionie – (France)
- 2004 : Pinocchio le robot – by Daniel Robichaud – (Canada/France/Spain)
- 2004 : T'choupi – by Jean-Luc François – (France)
- 2005 : Kirikou et les bêtes sauvages – by Michel Ocelot and Bénédicte Galup – (France/Vietnam)
- 2005 : Pollux, le manège enchanté – by Jean Duval (animator) – (United Kingdom/France)
- 2006 : Arthur et les Minimoys – by Luc Besson – (France)
- 2006 : Astérix et les Vikings – by Stefan Fjeldmark and Jesper Møller – (France/Denmark)
- 2006 : Azur et Asmar – by Michel Ocelot – (France/Italy/Belgium/Spain)
- 2006 : Franklin et le trésor du lac – by Dominique Monféry – (Canada/France)
- 2006 : Piccolo, Saxo et Cie – by Marco Villamizar and Éric Gutierrez- (France/Romania)
- 2006 : Le Vilain Petit Canard et moi – by Michael Hegner and Karsten Kiilerich – (Denmark/France/Germany/Ireland) – inspired by Andersen's tale
- 2006 : Renaissance – by Christian Volckman – (France/United Kingdom)
- 2006 : U – by Serge Elissalde and Grégoire Solotareff – (France)
- 2007 : Blanche-Neige, la suite – by Picha – (Belgium/France)
- 2007 : La Reine Soleil – by Philippe Leclerc – (France/Hungary/Belgium)
- 2007 : Nocturna – by Victor Maldonado, Adrian Garcia – (Spain/France/United Kingdom)
- 2007 : Persepolis – by Vincent Paronnaud and Marjane Satrapi – (France/Iran)
- 2007 : Tous à l'Ouest: Une Aventure de Lucky Luke – by Olivier Jean-Marie – (France) – An adaptation of Lucky Luke's album called "La Caravane"
- 2008 : Arthur et la Vengeance de Maltazard – by Luc Besson – (France)
- 2008 : Chasseurs de dragons – by Guillaume Ivernel – (France)
- 2008 : Igor – by Anthony Leondis – (United Kingdom/France) – réalisé dans les studios d'animation Sparx, à Paris.
- 2008 : Max & Co – by Samuel and Frédéric Guillaume – (Switzerland/Belgium/France/United Kingdom)
- 2008 : Mia et le Migou – by Jacques-Rémy Girerd – (France/Italy)
- 2008 : Peur(s) du noir – by Christian "Blutch" Hincker, Charles Burns, Marie Caillou, Pierre di Sciullo, Lorenzo Mattotti and Richard McGuire – (France/Italy)
- 2008 : La Véritable Histoire du chat botté – by Jérôme Deschamps – (France/Belgium/Switzerland)
- 2009 : Lascars : Pas de vacances pour les vrais gars ! – by Albert Pereira-Lazaro and Emmanuel Klotz – (France/Germany) – produced by the Borisfen-Lutece studio in Ukraine
- 2009 : Kérity, la maison des contes – by Dominique Monféry – (France/Italy)
- 2009 : Brendan et le Secret de Kells – by Tomm Moore and Nora Twomey – (Belgium/France/Ireland)

=== Films of the 2010s ===
- 2010 : Santa's Apprentice – by Luc Vinciguerra – (France/Australia/Ireland)
- 2010 : L'Illusionniste – by Sylvain Chomet – (France/United Kingdom)
- 2010 : Le Voyage extraordinaire de Samy – by Ben Stassen – (France/Belgium)
- 2010 : Une vie de chat – by d'Alain Gagnol and Jean-Loup Felicioli – (France/Netherlands/Switzerland/Belgium)
- 2010 : Arthur 3 – la Guerre des deux mondes by Luc Besson – (France)
- 2011 : Émilie Jolie – by Francis Nielsen and Philippe Chatel – (France)
- 2011 : Le Chat du rabbin – by Joann Sfar and Antoine Delesvaux – (France)
- 2011 : Les Contes de la nuit – by Michel Ocelot – (France)
- 2011 : The Prodigies – d'Antoine Charreyron – (France/United Kingdom/India/Belgium/Canada/Luxembourg/Poland)
- 2011 : Titeuf, le film – by Zep – (France/Switzerland)
- 2011 : A Monster in Paris – by Bibo Bergeron – (France)
- 2011 : Le Rêve de Galiléo – by Gil Alkabetz, Ghislain Avrillon, Alex Cervantes and Fabienne Collet – (France/Germany/Spain)
- 2011 : Le tableau – by Jean-François Laguionie – (France/Belgium)
- 2012 : Couleur de peau: miel – by Laurent Boileau and Jung Sik-jun – (France/Belgium)
- 2012 : Zarafa – by Rémi Bezançon and Jean-Christophe Lie – (France/Belgium)
- 2012 : Sammy 2 – by Vincent Kesteloot and Ben Stassen – (France/Belgium)
- 2012 : Kirikou et les hommes et les femmes – by Michel Ocelot – (France)
- 2012 : Le Jour Des Corniellies/ The Day of the Crows – by – (France/Belgium/Canada)
- 2012 : Ernest et Célestine – by Benjamin Renner, Stéphane Aubier and Vincent Patar – (Belgium/France/Luxembourg)
- 2013 : Aya de Yopougon – by Marguerite Abouet and Clément Oubrerie – (France)
- 2013 : L'Apprenti Père Noël et le flocon magique – by Luc Vinciguerra – (France/Belgium)
- 2013 : Ma maman est en Amérique, elle a rencontré Buffalo Bill – by Marc Boréal and Thibaut Chatel – (France/Luxembourg)
- 2013 : Le Manoir magique – by Jeremy Degruson and Ben Stassen – (France/Belgium)
- 2014 : Astérix: Le Domaine des Dieux – by Alexandre Astier – (France/Belgium)
- 2015 : April and the Extraordinary World – by Christian Desmares and Franck Ekinci – (France/Belgium/Canada)
- 2015 : Long Way North – by Rémi Chayé – (France/Denmark)
- 2016 : Robinson Crusoe – by Vincent Kesteloot and Ben Stassen – (France/Belgium)
- 2016 : Louise by the Shore – by Jean-François Laguionie – (France)
- 2017 : The Big Bad Fox and Other Tales... – by Benjamin Renner and Patrick Imbert – (France/Belgium)
- 2017 : Bigfoot Junior – by Ben Stassen and Jeremy Degruson – (France/Belgium)
- 2018 : Astérix: Le Secret de la Potion Magique – by Louis Clichy – (France)
- 2018 : White Fang – by Alexandre Espigares – (France/Luxembourg)
- 2019 : Playmobil, le film – by Lino DiSalvo – (France)
- 2019 : Les hirondelles de Kaboul – by Zabou Breitman and Éléa Gobbé-Mévellec – (France/Switzerland/Luxembourg/Monaco)
- 2019 : La Fameuse Invasion des ours en Sicile – by Lorenzo Mattotti – (France/Italy)
- 2019 : I Lost My Body – by Jeremy Clapin – (France)
- 2019 : Le Voyage du prince – by Jean-François Laguionie and Xavier Picard – (France/Luxembourg)
- 2019 : SamSam – by Tanguy de Kermel – (France/Belgium)

=== Films of the 2020s ===
- 2020 : L'extraordinaire Voyage de Marona – by Anca Damian – (France/Belgium/Romania)
- 2020 : Bigfoot Family – by Ben Stassen and Jeremy Degruson – (France/Belgium)
- 2020 : Yakari : La Grande Aventure – by Xavier Giacometti and Toby Genkel – (France/Belgium/Germany)
- 2020 : Josep – by Aurel – (France/Belgium/Spain)
- 2020 : Calamity, a Childhood of Martha Jane Cannary – by Rémi Chayé – (France/Denmark)
- 2020 : Petit Vampire – by Joann Sfar – (France/Belgium)
- 2021 : The Summit of the Gods – by Patrick Imbert – (France/Luxembourg)
- 2021 : Opal – by Alain Bidard – (France)
- 2021 : Where Is Anne Frank – by Ari Folman – (Belgium/Luxembourg/France/Netherlands/Israel)
- 2021 : Princesse Dragon – by Anthony Roux and Jean-Jacques Denis (France)
- 2022 : Hopper et le Hamster des ténèbres – by Benjamin Mousquet and Ben Stassen – (France/Belgium)
- 2022 : Yuku et la Fleur de l'Himalaya – by Arnaud Demuynck and Rémi Durin – (France/Belgium/Switzerland)
- 2022 : My Father's Secrets – by Vera Belmont – (France/Belgium)
- 2022 : My Grandfather's Demons – by Nuno Beato – (Portugal/Spain/France)
- 2022 : Le Petit Nicolas : Qu'est-ce qu'on attend pour être heureux? – by Amandine Fredon and Benjamin Massoubre – (France/Luxembourg/Canada)
- 2022 : Ernest & Celestine: A Trip to Gibberitia – by Julien Chheng and Jean-Christophe Roger – (France/Luxembourg)
- 2023 : Dounia and the Princess of Aleppo – by André Kadi and Marya Zarif – (Canada/France)
- 2023 : Mars Express – by Jérémie Périn – (France)
- 2023 : Pattie et la Colère de Poséidon – by David Alaux – (France)
- 2023 : La Sirène – by Sepideh Farsi – (France/Germany/Luxembourg/Belgium)
- 2023 : Miraculous, le film – by Jeremy Zag – (France)
- 2023 : Les As de la jungle 2 : Opération tour du monde – by Benoît Somville – (France)
- 2023 : Nina et le secret du hérisson – by Jean-Loup Felicioli and Alain Gagnol – (France/Luxembourg)
- 2023 : Linda veut du poulet! – by Sébastien Laudenbach and Chiara Malta – (France/Italy)
- 2023 : Les Inséparables – by Jérémie Degruson – (Belgium/France/Spain)
- 2023 : Sirocco et le Royaume des courants d'air – by Benoît Chieux – (Belgium/France)
- 2023 : Migration – by Benjamin Renner – (United States/France)
- 2024 : Léo – by Jim Capobianco – (United States/France/Ireland)
- 2024 : They Shot the Piano Player – by Fernando Trueba and Javier Mariscal – (Spain/France/Netherlands/Portugal/Peru)
- 2024 : Le Royaume de Kensuké – by Neil Boyle and Kirk Hendry – (France/Luxembourg/United Kingdom)
- 2024 : Flow: Le chat qui n'avait plus peur de l'eau – by Gints Zilbalodis – (Belgium/France/Latvia)
- 2024 : La Plus Précieuse des marchandises – by Michel Hazanavicius – (France/Belgium)

== Featurettes ==
- 1982 : Chronopolis – by Piotr Kamler – (France/Poland)
- 1983 : La princesse insensible – by Michel Ocelot
- 1997 : Du tableau noir à l'écran blanc – by Paul Dopff
- 2002 : Solitudine – by Bernard Cerf
- 2003 : Corto Maltese : La Ballade de la mer salée
- 2003 : Corto Maltese : Sous le signe du Capricorne
- 2003 : Corto Maltese : Les Celtiques
- 2003 : Corto Maltese : La Maison dorée de Samarkand
- 2003 : Halman's Walk – by Jean-Baptiste Decavèle
- 2003 : Demake-up – by Marc Bruimaud
- 2003 : La Cure Stories – by Frédérique Lecerf
- 2004 : Grenze – by Patrick Fontana

== Shorts ==
=== Short films of the 1910s ===
- 1912 : Le Chinois and le Bourriquot articulé by Marius O'Galop
- 1914 : Quelques principes d’hygiène by Marius O'Galop and Jean Comandon
- 1917 : Les Aventures by Clémentine – by Benjamin Rabier and Émile Cohl
- 1917 : Les Aventures des Pieds Nickelés - 1er épisode – by Émile Cohl – série Les Aventures des Pieds Nickelés
- 1917 : Les Aventures des Pieds Nickelés - 2e épisode – by Émile Cohl – série Les Aventures des Pieds Nickelés
- 1917 : Le Bon fricot – by Marius O'Galop
- 1917 : Les Tracas by Zigouillot – by Émile Cohl – série Les Aventures des Pieds Nickelés
- 1917 : Clémentine and Flambeau – by Benjamin Rabier
- 1917 : Conseils pour la vie chère – by Robert Lortac
- 1917 : Et nos poilus qu’en pensent-ils ? – by Robert Lortac
- 1917 : Les Exploits by Marius – by Robert Lortac
- 1917 : Les Fiançailles by Flambeau – by Benjamin Rabier and Émile Cohl
- 1917 : M. Wilson président des USA and l’espion obstiné – by Robert Lortac
- 1917 : Misti le nain by la forêt – by Benjamin Rabier
- 1917 : Une nouveauté pratique : la marmite norvégienne – by Robert Lortac
- 1918 : Les Aventures des Pieds Nickelés – 5e épisode – by Émile Cohl – série Les Aventures des Pieds Nickelés
- 1918 : L’Évasion by Latude – by Robert Lortac
- 1918 : Filochard se distingue – by Émile Cohl – série Les Aventures des Pieds Nickelés
- 1918 : On doit le dire by Marius O'Galop and Jean Comandon
- 1918 : L'Oubli par l'alcool by Marius O'Galop and Jean Comandon
- 1918 : Le Taudis doit être vaincu by Marius O'Galop and Jean Comandon
- 1918 : La Tuberculose menace tout le monde – by Robert Lortac and Jean Comandon
- 1918 : Tenfaipas se marie ce matin… – by Robert Lortac
- 1918 : Touchatout ami des bêtes – by Marius O'Galop
- 1919 : Bécassotte bonne à Quimper – by Marius O'Galop – série Bécassotte
- 1919 : Bécassotte and son cochon – by Marius O'Galop – série Bécassotte
- 1919 : Caramel – by Benjamin Rabier
- 1919 : Le Circuit by l’alcool – by Marius O'Galop and Jean Comandon
- 1919 : Comment Pécopin épousa la belle Ugénie – by Marius O'Galop
- 1919 : La Journée by Flambeau – by Benjamin Rabier and Émile Cohl
- 1919 : Flambeau au pays des surprises – by Benjamin Rabier and Émile Cohl
- 1919 : Misti and le géant Rustic – by Benjamin Rabier
- 1919 : La Mouche – by Marius O'Galop and Jean Comandon
- 1919 : Petites causes grands effets – by Marius O'Galop and Jean Comandon
- 1919 : Touchatout peintre by talent – by Marius O'Galop
- 1919 : Touchatout joue Faust – by Marius O'Galop
- 1919 : La Tuberculose se prend sur le zinc – by Marius O'Galop and Jean Comandon
- 1919 : Un rude lapin – by Benjamin Rabier

=== Short films of the 1920s ===
- 1920 : Les Amours d'un escargot – by Benjamin Rabier
- 1920 : Les Animaux domestiques ou Une aventure zoologicomique – by Robert Lortac and Landelle
- 1920 : Bécassotte à la mer – by Marius O'Galop – série Bécassotte
- 1920 : Bécassotte au jardin zoologique – by Marius O'Galop – série Bécassotte
- 1920 : La Chasse aux rats est ouverte – by Robert Lortac
- 1920 : Les Chevaliers by la cloche by bois – by Robert Lortac and Cheval
- 1920 : Cœur by grenouille – by Benjamin Rabier
- 1920 : Dans les griffes by l'araignée – by Ladislas Starewitch
- 1920 : Les Éruptions célèbres – by Robert Lortac and Cheval
- 1920 : Faites comme le nègre – by Robert Lortac and Landelle
- 1920 : Gringalet and Ducosto ou La Revanche by Gringalet dentiste – by Robert Lortac and Landelle
- 1920 : J'ai perdu mon enfant – by Benjamin Rabier
- 1920 : Le Meilleur argument – by Robert Lortac and Landelle
- 1920 : Microbus, Bigfellow and la crise des domestiques – by Robert Lortac and Landelle
- 1920 : Monsieur Difficile a des visions – by Robert Lortac and Paulme
- 1920 : Physique amusante – by Robert Lortac and Landelle
- 1920 : On doit le dire – by Marius O'Galop
- 1920 : Physique amusante – by Robert Lortac and Landelle
- 1920 : La Réponse by l’au-delà – by Robert Lortac
- 1920 : Le Testament by Findubec – by Robert Lortac
- 1920 : Tom and Tim policemen d’occasion – by Robert Lortac and J.J. Rouseau
- 1920 : Un drame à la cuisine – by Robert Lortac
- 1921 : L'Aspirateur du professeur Mécanicas – by Robert Lortac
- 1921 : Bicard a résolu la crise du logement – by Raymond Galoyer and André Yvetot
- 1921 : La Bonne cuisinière – by Robert Lortac – série Mécanicas
- 1921 : Compère Guilleri, chanson ancienne – by Marius O'Galop
- 1921 : La Consigne by Toby – by Robert Lortac – série Toby
- 1921 : Le Corbeau and le Renard – by Marius O'Galop
- 1921 : L'Épouvantail – by Ladislas Starewitch
- 1921 : La Grenouille qui veut se faire aussi grosse que le bœuf – by Marius O'Galop
- 1921 : Le Lièvre and la Tortue – by Marius O'Galop
- 1921 : Le Mariage by Babylas – by Ladislas Starewitch
- 1921 : Mistouffle dîne à l’oeil – by Robert Lortac
- 1921 : Mistouffle au violon – by Robert Lortac
- 1921 : Monsieur Duncam zoologiste anglais – by Robert Lortac
- 1921 : Monsieur Vieux-Bois – by Robert Lortac and Cavé
- 1921 : L'Ours and les Deux Compagnons – by Marius O'Galop
- 1921 : Le Pot by terre contre le Pot by fer – by Robert Lortac and Cavé
- 1921 : Potiron fait by l'auto – by Albert Mourlan – série Potiron
- 1921 : Potiron, homme invisible – by Albert Mourlan – série Potiron
- 1921 : Potiron garçon by café – by Albert Mourlan – série Potiron
- 1921 : La Maison automatique ou Le Réveil du professeur Mécanicas – by Robert Lortac – série Mécanicas
- 1921 : Toby a soif – by Robert Lortac – série Toby
- 1921 : Toto au berceau – by Robert Lortac and Landelle – série Toto
- 1921 : Une invention du professeur Mécanicas – by Robert Lortac – série Mécanicas
- 1921 : Potiron agent by police – by Albert Mourlan – série Potiron
- 1922 : L'Affaire by la rue Lepic – by Raymond Galoyer and André Yvetot
- 1922 : Bigfellow craint les autos – by Robert Lortac and Landelle
- 1922 : La Cigale and la Fourmi – by Robert Lortac and Landelle
- 1922 : Les Déboires d'un piéton – by Robert Lortac and Landelle
- 1922 : En vitesse – by Robert Lortac and Landelle
- 1922 : Les Grenouilles qui demandent un roi – by Ladislas Starewitch
- 1922 : Le Lion and le Rat – by Robert Lortac and Landelle
- 1922 : Mère l'oie a mangé la grenouille – by Benjamin Rabier
- 1922 : Monsieur by la Palisse – by Marius O'Galop
- 1922 : Le Noël by Toto – by Robert Lortac and Landelle – série Toto
- 1922 : Le Petit Poucet – by Marius O'Galop
- 1922 : Les Quatre Cents Coups by Flambeau – by Benjamin Rabier
- 1922 : La Queue en trompette – by Benjamin Rabier
- 1922 : Un horrible cauchemar – by Robert Lortac and Landelle
- 1923 : Bécassotte and le papillon – by Marius O'Galop – série Bécassotte
- 1923 : La Belette entrée dans un grenier – by Marius O'Galop
- 1923 : Cendrillon ou la petite pantoufle by vair – by Robert Lortac and Cheval
- 1923 : L'Eau des géants and la poudre des nains – by Robert Lortac and Landelle
- 1923 : Le Loup and la Cigogne – by Marius O'Galop and Louis Forest
- 1923 : Mécanicas and la réclame – by Robert Lortac – série Mécanicas
- 1923 : Le Rat des villes and le Rat des champs – by Marius O'Galop and Louis Forest
- 1923 : Le Renard and les Raisins – by Marius O'Galop
- 1923 : Le Roman by la momie – by Robert Lortac and André Rigal
- 1923 : Gulliver chez les lilliputiens – by Albert Mourlan and Raymond Villette
- 1923 : Toto acrobate – by Robert Lortac – série Toto
- 1923 : Toto artiste peintre ou Toto est un artiste précoce – by Robert Lortac and Landelle – série Toto
- 1923 : La Voix du rossignol – by Ladislas Starewitch
- 1924 : Ballet mécanique – by Fernand Léger
- 1924 : Boby prend la mouche – by Robert Lortac
- 1924 : La Colombe and la Fourmi – by Marius O'Galop
- 1924 : Entr'acte – by René Clair
- 1924 : Les Malheurs by Collignon – by Robert Lortac and André Rigal
- 1924 : La Petite Chanteuse des rues – by Ladislas Starewitch
- 1924 : Les Inventions by Mécanicas, la Sève poilifère – by Robert Lortac – série Mécanicas
- 1924 : Toto aviateur – by Robert Lortac – série Toto
- 1924 : Toto musicien – by Robert Lortac – série Toto
- 1924 : Un chien trop bien dressé – by Robert Lortac
- 1925 : Mécanicas and la greffe animale – by Robert Lortac – série Mécanicas
- 1925 : Mécanicas and la machine à guérir – by Robert Lortac – série Mécanicas
- 1925 : La Révolte des betteraves – by Albert Mourlan
- 1925 : Les Yeux du dragon – by Ladislas Starewitch
- 1926 : Le Rat des villes and le Rat des champs – by Ladislas Starewitch
- 1927 : La Coquille and le clergyman – by Germaine Dulac
- 1928 : L'Étoile by mer – by Man Ray
- 1928 : Joko le singe – by Antoine Payen – série Joko le singe
- 1928 : L'Horloge magique ou la petite fille qui voulait être princesse – by Ladislas Starewitch
- 1928 : La Petite Parade – by Ladislas Starewitch
- 1929 : Conte by la 1002e nuit – by Albert Mourlan
- 1929 : Les Mystères du Château by Dé – by Man Ray
- 1929 : Zut épouse Flûte – by André Daix – série Zut, Flûte and Trotte
- 1929 : Zut chez les sorcières – by André Daix – série Zut, Flûte and Trotte

=== Short films of the 1930s ===
- 1930 : Monsieur Grostacot and Madame Petitoto en voyage – by Robert Lortac and Mallet
- 1930 : Les Petits Héros – by André Daix
- 1931 : Ce soir à 8 heures – by Pierre Charbonnier
- 1931 : L'Histoire du soldat inconnu – by Henri Storck
- 1931 : Meunier, tu dors... – by Jean Delaurier and Jean Varé
- 1931 : Natalité – by André Rigal
- 1931 : Zut and Flûte passagers clandestins – by André Daix – série Zut, Flûte and Trotte
- 1931 : Zut détective – by André Daix – série Zut, Flûte and Trotte
- 1931 : Panouillard à bord – by André Daix
- 1932 : L'Idée – by Berthold Bartosch
- 1932 : Le Rat des villes and le rat des champs – by Ladislas Starewitch
- 1932 : Un concours by beauté – by Alain Saint-Ogan
- 1932 : Zut chez les sportifs – by André Daix – série Zut, Flûte and Trotte
- 1933 : Fétiche mascotte – by Ladislas Starewitch
- 1933 : Les Funérailles – by Anthony Gross
- 1933 : Une journée en Afrique – by Anthony Gross
- 1933 : Une nuit sur le mont Chauve – by Alexandre Alexeieff and Claire Parker
- 1934 : La Découverte by l'Amérique – by Mimma Indelli
- 1934 : Fétiche prestidigitateur by Ladislas Starewitch and Irène Starewitch
- 1934 : Histoire sans paroles : À l'est rien by nouveau – by Bogdan Zoubowitch
- 1934 : La Joie by vivre – by Anthony Gross and Hector Hoppins
- 1935 : Couchés dans le foin – by Jean Delaurier, Georges Bouisset and Raymond by Villepreux
- 1935 : Michka – by Bogdan Zoubowitch
- 1936 : Anatole compositeur – by Érik (André Jolly)
- 1936 : Les Aventures du professeur Nimbus – by André Daix and Jacques Noël
- 1936 : Fétiche en voyage by noce – by Ladislas Starewitch and Irène Starewitch
- 1936 : La Fortune enchantée – by Pierre Charbonnier
- 1936 : Le Jour and la Nuit – by Anthony Gross
- 1936 : Perrette and le pot au lait – by Pierre Bourgeon
- 1938 : Barbe-Bleue – by Jean Painlevé and René Bertrand
- 1939 : La Danse macabre – by Jean Giaume and Alex Giaume
- 1939 : La Flûte enchantée – by Jean Giaume and Alex Giaume
- 1939 : Les Galéjeurs by la mer – by Jean Giaume and Alex Giaume – série Olive and Marius
- 1939 : Un certain Gérald – by Érik (André Jolly)

=== Short films of the 1940s ===
- 1940 : François Lefranc défend la pomme by terre – by Robert Lortac
- 1941 : Prof toc savant – by Georges Arnstam – série Les Aventures du professeur Toc and by son robot
- 1941 : La Vie idéale – by Pierre Bourgeon
- 1941 : La Visite au zoo – by Pierre Bourgeon
- 1942 : Cigalon chez les fourmis : Après l'orage by Pierre Bourgeon
- 1942 : Élixir by longue vie – by Georges Arnstam – série Les Aventures du professeur Toc and by son robot
- 1942 : L'Épouvantail – by Paul Grimault
- 1942 : Le Marchand by notes – by Paul Grimault
- 1942 : Les Théorèmes du professeur Pym : Qui pèse bien... – by Arcady Brachlianoff
- 1942 : Une mouche sur le mur – by Érik (André Jolly)
- 1943 : Les Aventures by Kapok l'esquimau and by son ours Oscar – by Arcady Brachlianoff – série Les Aventures by Kapok l'esquimau and by son ours Oscar
- 1943 : Callisto, la petite nymphe by Diane – by André Édouard Marty
- 1943 : Cap'taine Sabord appareille – by André Rigal – série Les Aventures du Cap'tain Sabord
- 1943 : Le Carillon du vieux manoir – by Arcady Brachlianoff
- 1943 : La Chasse infernale – by Jean Giaume and Alex Giaume
- 1943 : La Nuit enchantée – by Raymond Jeannin
- 1943 : Les Noirs jouent and gagnent – by Jean Image
- 1943 : Puck baladin – by Érik (André Jolly)
- 1943 : V'là l'beau temps – by André Rigal – série Les Aventures du Cap'tain Sabord
- 1944 : À la découverte – by Arcady Brachlianoff
- 1944 : Au clair by la lune – by Bogdan Zoubowitch
- 1944 : Cap'taine Sabord dans l'île mystérieuse – by André Rigal – série Les Aventures du Cap'tain Sabord
- 1944 : Leurs premières aventures by Jean-Louis Daniel
- 1944 : Nimbus libéré by Raymond Jeannin
- 1944 : Le Scaphandrier – by Arcady Brachlianoff
- 1944 : La Vie des styles – by Érik (André Jolly)
- 1944 : Le Voleur by paratonnerres by Paul Grimault
- 1944 : Princesse Clé by Sol – by Jean Image
- 1945 : Astres and désastres – by Arcady Brachlianoff – série Les Aventures by Kapok l'esquimau and by son ours Oscar
- 1945 : Pierrot se libère – by Jean-Bernard Bosc
- 1946 : Les Aventures d'Oscar la Bricole – by Paul by Roubaix
- 1946 : Le Briquet magique – by Bogdan Zoubowitch
- 1946 : Choupinet au ciel – by Omer Boucquey
- 1946 : Cri-Cri, Ludo and l'orage – by Antoine Payen
- 1946 : Les Enfants du ciel – by Wilma by Quiche
- 1946 : La Flûte magique – by Paul Grimault
- 1946 : Rhapsodie by Saturne – by Jean Image
- 1947 : Anatole fait du camping – by Albert Dubout
- 1947 : Anatole à la tour by Nesle – by Albert Dubout
- 1947 : Le Petit Soldat – by Paul Grimault / Jacques Prévert
- 1947 : Querelles by cœurs – by Marcel-Évelyn Floris
- 1948 : Ballade atomique – by Jean Image and Albert Champeaux
- 1948 : Jacky, Jackotte and les sortilèges – by Antoine Payen
- 1949 : Le Base Ball – by Arcady Brachlianoff
- 1949 : Fleur by fougère – by Ladislas Starewitch and Irène Starewitch
- 1949 : Le Troubadour by la Joie – by Omer Boucquey
- 1949 : Monsieur Tout-le-Monde – by Jean Image

=== Short films of the 1950s ===
- 1951 : Légende cruelle – by Arcady Brachlianoff and Gilles Pommerand
- 1952 : Grrr – by André Rigal
- 1952 : Léonard by Vinci – by Arcady Brachlianoff
- 1953 : Pieter Brueghel l'Ancien – by Arcady Brachlianoff, Edmond Lévy and Gérard Pignol
- 1954 : La Cigale and la Fourmi – by Jean Image
- 1954 : Le Mystère by la licorne – by Arcady Brachlianoff and Jean-Claude Sée
- 1955 : Images préhistoriques – by Arcady Brachlianoff and Thomas Rowe
- 1955 : Le Loup and l'Agneau – by Jean Image
- 1956 : Monsieur Victor ou la Machine à retrouver le temps – by Jean Image
- 1957 : L'Aventure du Père Noël – by Jean Image
- 1957 : Gag Express – by Albert Champeaux and Pierre Watrin
- 1958 : Le Messager by l'hiver – by Bogdan Zoubowitch and Antoine Payen
- 1958 : Paris-Flash – by Albert Champeaux and Pierre Watrin
- 1958 : Le Petit Peintre and la Sirène – by Jean Image
- 1958 : Voyage en Boscavie – by Jean Vautrin and Claude Choublier
- 1959 : Les Astronautes – by Walerian Borowczyk / Chris Marker
- 1959 : François s'évade – by Jean Image
- 1959 : L'Horrible, bizarre and incroyable histoire by Monsieur Tête – by Jan Lenica and Henri Gruel
- 1959 : Prélude pour orchestre, voix and caméra ou La Fille by la mer and by la nuit – by Arcady Brachlianoff

=== Short films of the 1960s ===
- 1960 : Le Chêne and le Roseau – by Jean Image and Denis Baupin
- 1960 : Les Dents du singe – by René Laloux
- 1960 : Moukengue – by Denise Charvein
- 1960 : L'Ondomane – by Arcady Brachlianoff
- 1960 : Villa mon rêve – by Albert Champeaux and Pierre Watrin
- 1961 : Le Cadeau – by Jacques Vausseur and Dick Roberts
- 1961 : Marcel, ta mère t'appelle – by Jacques Colombat
- 1961 : Un oiseau en papier journal – by Julien Pappé
- 1962 : Albert Marquet – by Arcady Brachlianoff
- 1962 : La Chanson du jardinier fou – by Jacques Espagne
- 1962 : Le Concert by M. and Mme Kabal – by Walerian Borowczyk
- 1962: La Fourmi géante – by Jean Image
- 1962 : Mais où sont les nègres d'antan ? – by Michel Boschet and André Martin
- 1962 : Maître – by Manuel Otéro and Jacques Leroux
- 1962 : Les Nuages fous – by Henri Lacam
- 1962 : Résurrection – by Germaine Prudhommeaux
- 1962 : Sirène – by Jean Hurtado
- 1963 : L'Encyclopédie by grand'maman – by Walerian Borowczyk
- 1963 : L'Impossible géométrie – Jean-Pierre Rhein
- 1963 : Merci, Monsieur Schmtz – by Albert Champeaux and Pierre Watrin
- 1963 : Le Nez – by Alexandre Alexeieff and Claire Parker
- 1963 : L'Œuf à la coque – by Marc Andrieux and Bernard Brévent
- 1963 : Renaissance – by Walerian Borowczyk
- 1963 : Vélodrame – by Robert Lapoujade
- 1964 : A – by Jan Lenica (France/Allemagne)
- 1964 : Acte sans parole – by Bruno Bettiol and Italo Bettiol
- 1964: Appétit d'oiseau – by Peter Foldès
- 1964 : Contons fleurette – by Albert Champeaux and Pierre Watrin
- 1964 : La Demoiselle and le Violoncelliste – by Jean-François Laguionie
- 1964 : Les Jeux des anges – by Walerian Borowczyk
- 1964 : Meurtre – by Piotr Kamler
- 1964 : La Porte – by Jacques Vausseur
- 1964 : Les Oiseaux sont des cons – by Chaval
- 1964 : Les Temps morts – by René Laloux
- 1965 : Les Automanes – by Arcady Brachlianoff
- 1965 : Comme chien and chat – by Ladislas Starewitch
- 1965 : Les Escargots – by René Laloux
- 1965 : Le Jongleur by Notre-Dame – by Stefano Lonati and Italo Bettiol
- 1965 : Martien 0001 – by José Piquer
- 1965 : Pierrot – by Jacques Leroux
- 1965 : La Planète verte – by Piotr Kamler
- 1965 : Plus vite – by Peter Földes
- 1965 : Souvenir d’Épinal – by Jean Image
- 1965 : Un garçon plein d'avenir – by Peter Foldes
- 1966 : L'Arche by Noé – by Jean-François Laguionie
- 1966 : La Ballade d'Émile – by Manuel Otéro
- 1966 : Contre-pied – by Manuel Otéro
- 1966 : La Nativité racontée en image d'après les Écritures – by André-Édouard Marty
- 1966 : Paris-Nice en voiture – by Albert Champeaux
- 1966 : Space dance – by Albert Pierru
- 1967 : Arès contre Atlas – by Manuel Otéro
- 1967 : Éveil – by Peter Földes
- 1967 : Images pour un clown – by Richard Guillon
- 1967 : L'Ombre by la pomme – by Robert Lapoujade
- 1968 : L'Araignéléphant – by Piotr Kamler
- 1968 : Les Enfants by l'espace – by Jean Image
- 1969 : Calaveras – by Jacques Colombat
- 1969 : Le Dernier fantôme – by Jacques Ansan
- 1969 : Labyrinthe – by Piotr Kamler
- 1969 : Sourire – by Paul Dopff
- 1969 : Une bombe par hasard – by Jean-François Laguionie
- 1969 : Univers – by Manuel Otéro
- 1969 : Visages by femmes – by Peter Foldès
- 1969 : What happened to Eva Braun – by David McNeil

=== Short films of the 1970s ===
- 1970 : Les Chouettes – by Jean Rubak
- 1970 : Délicieuse catastrophe – by Piotr Kamler
- 1970 : Le Miroir – by Roger Amiot
- 1970 : Patatomanie – by Jean Image
- 1970 : Patchwork – by Manuel Otéro, Daniel Suter, Claude Luyet, Gérald Poussin and Georges Schwizgebel
- 1971 : Le Cagouince migrateur – by Francis Masse
- 1971 : Fantorro, le dernier justicier – by Jan Lenica
- 1971 : Quand les gourous s'gourent – by C. Desaegher and B. Dessauvages
- 1971 : 14 juillet – by Paul Tousch, Christian Ginsberg, Jean-Luc Blanchet, Francis Masse and Jean-Louis Forain
- 1971 : Retour au bois joli – by Anna Harda – (France/Poland)
- 1971 : Le Robot – by Albert Champeaux and Pierre Watrin
- 1971 : Vive les bains by mer – by Jean Hurtado
- 1972 : La Chute – by Paul Dopff
- 1972 : Fin – by Roger Amiot
- 1972 : Le Fumaillon – by Gilles Baur
- 1972 : Le Masque du diable – by Jean-François Laguionie
- 1972 : Le Pays beau – by Martin Boschet
- 1972 : Potr' and la fille des eaux – by Jean-François Laguionie
- 1972 : Prolégomènes – by Alexis Poliakoff
- 1972 : Raffiner toujours – by Jean Aurance
- 1972 : Tableaux d'une exposition – by Alexandre Alexeieff and Claire Parker
- 1972 : Un oiseau pas comme les autres – by Jean-Pierre Rhein
- 1972 : Visuels – Catherine Lapras
- 1973 : Le Chien mélomane – by Paul Grimault
- 1973 : Cœur by secours – by Piotr Kamler
- 1973 : Évasion express – by Francis Masse
- 1973 : Folies Bergère – by Philippe Fausten
- 1973 : La Montagne qui accouche – by Jacques Colombat
- 1973 : L'Œuf by Colomb – by Christian Davi
- 1973 : L'Oie bleue – by Gilles Baur
- 1973 : L'Oiseau – by Ihab Shaker
- 1973 : Le Pépin – by Reynald Bellot
- 1973 : Souvenirs – by Nicole Dufour
- 1973 : Tant qu'il y aura des feuilles – by Henri Heidsieck
- 1973 : La Tête – by Émile Bourget
- 1973 : Tour d'ivoire – by Bernard Palacios
- 1973 : Un – by Paul Brizzi and Gaëtan Brizzi
- 1973 : La Version originelle – by Paul Dopff
- 1973 : Tour d'ivoire – by Bernard Palacios
- 1974 : L'Acteur – by Jean-François Laguionie
- 1974 : À la vôtre – by Monique Renault
- 1974 : Comme il pleut sur la ville – by Didier Pourcel
- 1974 : L'Empreinte – by Jacques Cardon
- 1974 : Les Nouvelles aventures by la Tête – by Yan Brzozowski and Jean-Jacques Netter
- 1974 : Le Pas – by Piotr Kamler
- 1974 : Paysage – by Jan Lenica
- 1974 : Square des abbesses – by Yves Brangolo
- 1974 : Un comédien sans paradoxe – by Robert Lapoujade
- 1974 : Un grain by sable dans le mécanisme – by Philippe Leclerc
- 1974 : Un pied sous le chapeau – by Jean-Louis Miriel
- 1975 : Ad vitam aeternam – by Gilles Baur
- 1975 : Blanc bonnet and bonnet blanc – by Jean-Pierre Jacquet
- 1975 : Claustrophobie – by Philippe Leclerc
- 1975 : Dog Song ou les chiens voyageurs – by Julien Pappé and Michel Roudevitch
- 1975 : Illusions – Nicole Dufour
- 1975 : Oiseau by nuit – by Bernard Palacios
- 1975 : La Perdue – by Dominique Fournier
- 1975 : La Rosette arrosée – by Paul Dopff
- 1976 : Autre-là – by Paul Cornet
- 1976 : Le Déjeuner sous l'herbe – by Gilles Baur
- 1976 : Dé profondis – by Henri Heidsieck
- 1976 : Le Fantôme by l'infirmière – by Michel Longuet
- 1976 : On voyage – by André Lindon
- 1976 : La Petite Sardine rose – by Jean Image
- 1976 : Une vieille soupière – by Michel Longuet
- 1977 : L'Anatomiste – by Yves Brangolo
- 1977 : Conclusion – by Jacques Barsac
- 1977 : La Nichée – by M. G. Collin
- 1977 : Les Nuits by Casimir and Lætitia – by Christine Deplante and Christian Deplante
- 1977 : Le Phénomène – by Paul Dopff
- 1977 : Tentation enfantine – by Christian Thomas
- 1978 : Barbe-Bleue – by Olivier Gillon
- 1978 : L'Évasion – by Jean-Pierre Jeunet and Marc Caro
- 1978 : La Traversée – by Paul Dopff and Gabriel Cotto
- 1978 : La Traversée by l'Atlantique à la rame – by Jean-François Laguionie
- 1979 : Belzebuth roi des mouches – by Patrick Traon and Jean-Claude Langlart
- 1979 : Blaise – by Hippolyte Girardot
- 1979 : Cavalier mécanique – by Françoise Gloagen
- 1979 : Drame dans la forêt – by Thérèse Mallinson
- 1979 : D'une gompa l'autre – by Jacques-Rémy Girerd
- 1979 : L'E motif – by Jean-Christophe Villard
- 1979 : Flagrant délit – by Jean-Pierre Jacquet
- 1979 : Harlem nocturne – by Pierre Barletta
- 1979 : Jean-Émile – by Hippolyte Girardot
- 1979 : Nuits blanches – by Nicole Dufour
- 1979 : Supermouche – by Paul Dopff
- 1979 : Le Temps d'aspirer – by Jean Gillet
- 1979 : Le Trouble-fête – by Bernard Palacios
- 1979 : Quatre mille images fœtales – by Jacques-Rémy Girerd

=== Short films of the 1980s ===
- 1980 : Actualités – by Jean-Jacques Sebbane
- 1980 : L'Échelle – by Alain Ughetto
- 1980 : Hunga – by Kali Carlini
- 1980 : Le Manège – by Jean-Pierre Jeunet and Marc Caro
- 1980 : Les Musus – by Otmar Gutmann
- 1980 : Rien by spécial – by Jacques-Rémy Girerd
- 1980 : La Tendresse du maudit – by Jean-Manuel Costa
- 1980 : Tendre moignon – by Jean-Yves Amir and Olivier Langlois
- 1980 : Les Trois Inventeurs – by Michel Ocelot
- 1980 : Trois thèmes – by Alexandre Alexeieff and Claire Parker
- 1980 : Un matin ordinaire – by Michel Gauthier
- 1981 : L'Argent ne fait pas le moine – by Jean-Luc Trotignon
- 1981 : Allons-y la jeunesse – by Gérard Collin
- 1981 : Désert – by José Xavier
- 1981 : Les Filles by l'égalité – by Michel Ocelot
- 1981 : Morfocipris – by Jean-Christophe Villard
- 1981 : Les Pieds Nickelés and le trésor d'Ali-Naja – by René Charles
- 1981 : Trou – by Pascal Tirmant
- 1982 : Chronique 1909 – by Paul Brizzi and Gaëtan Brizzi
- 1982 : Je demain – by Jean-Pierre Ader
- 1982 : La Légende du pauvre bossu – by Michel Ocelot
- 1982 : Le Rêve by Pygmalion – by Josiane Perillat
- 1982 : Sans préavis – by Michel Gauthier
- 1982 : Le Voyage d'Orphée – by Jean-Manuel Costa
- 1983 : Au-delà by minuit – by Pierre Barletta
- 1983 : Compte courant – by Paul Dopff
- 1983 : L'Invité – by Guy Jacques
- 1983 : Maison vole – by André Martin and Philippe Quéau
- 1983 : Néantderthal – by Jean-Christophe Villard
- 1983 : Pedibus – by Paul Dopff
- 1983 : La Photographie – by Gérald Frydman – (Belgium/France)
- 1983 : La Princesse insensible – by Michel Ocelot
- 1983 : Râ – by Thierry Barthes and Pierre Jamin
- 1984 : La Boule – by Alain Ughetto
- 1984 : La Campagne est si belle – by Michel Gauthier
- 1984 : Carnet by voyage Quebec-La Rochelle – by Bruce Krebs
- 1984 : 5 doigts pour el pueblo – by Bruce Krebs and Mireille Boucard
- 1984 : Le Cirque des trois petits animaux tristes – by Jacques-Rémy Girerd
- 1984 : Coloclip – by Jacques-Rémy Girerd
- 1984 : L'Enfant by la haute mer – by Patrick Deniau
- 1984 : Paysage by rêve – by Paul Dopff
- 1984 : Question by forme – by Alain Monclin
- 1985 : Bleu marine and rouge pompon – by Jacques Rouxel
- 1985 : Carnets d'esquisses – by Michaël Gaumnitz
- 1985 : Contes crépusculaires – by Yves Charnay
- 1985 : Criminal Tango – by Solweig von Kleist
- 1985 : 2 ou 3 choses que je sais by la Bretagne – by Bruce Krebs
- 1985 : Les Deux petits noctambules – by Jacques-Rémy Girerd
- 1985 : Le Petit Cirque dans les étoiles – by Jacques-Rémy Girerd
- 1985 : La Prisonnière – by René Laloux and Philippe Caza
- 1985 : La Quête du vieux clown – by Jacques-Rémy Girerd
- 1985 : Spirale – by Henri Heidsieck
- 1985 : Traverses – by Antoine Lopez
- 1985 : Un beau matin – by Serge Avédikian
- 1986 : L'Éléphant and la Baleine – by Jacques-Rémy Girerd
- 1986 : Le Film file – by Nicolas Gautron
- 1986 : Frankenstein circus – by Jacques-Rémy Girerd
- 1986 : French Gallup – by Claude Huhardeaux
- 1986 : La Montagne du loup – by Henri Heidsieck
- 1986 : Les Perles by l'amour – by Francis Leroi
- 1986 : Le Petit Cirque by toutes les couleurs – by Jacques-Rémy Girerd
- 1986 : Les Quatre Vœux – by Michel Ocelot
- 1986 : Taureau – by Marianne Guilhou
- 1986 : Un point c'est tout – by Claude Rocher
- 1986 : La Ville – by Sophie Mariller
- 1986 : Zebra Crossing Blues – by Bruce Krebs
- 1987 : Brume, escale trop courte – by Hugues Bourdoncle
- 1987 : Comment Wang Fo fut sauvé – by René Laloux
- 1987 : Cythère, l'apprentie sorcière – by Jacques-Rémy Girerd
- 1987 : Élégance and joyeux anniversaire – by Paul Dopff
- 1987 : L'Île fantôme – by Jean-François Laguionie
- 1987 : Lucie s'est échappée – by Nicole Dufour
- 1987 : Métamorphoses (série by sept jingles) – by Jacques-Rémy Girerd
- 1987 : Pépère and Mémère – by Federico Vitali
- 1987 : Transatlantique – by Bruce Krebs
- 1987 : Variations – by Patrick Deniau
- 1988 : Déchirure vaudou – by Bruce Krebs
- 1988 : L'Escalier chimérique – by Daniel Guyonnet
- 1988 : Jumpin' Jacques Splash – by Jerzy Kular and Isabelle Foucher
- 1988 : La Princesse des diamants – by Michel Ocelot
- 1988 : La Rage du désert – by Jacques-Rémy Girerd
- 1988 : Sculpture, sculptures – by Jean-Loup Felicioli
- 1988 : Stylo – by Paul Coudsi and Daniel Borenstein
- 1988 : Thulé – by Serge Verny
- 1988 : Le Topologue – by Marc Caro
- 1988 : Toujours plus vite – by Jacques-Rémy Girerd
- 1988 : Valence je t'aime – by Jacques-Rémy Girerd
- 1988 : Une minute pour les droits by l'homme – by Jacques-Rémy Girerd
- 1989 : À la recherche du temps perdu – by Gilles Burgard
- 1989 : Amerlock – by Jacques-Rémy Girerd
- 1989 : La Belle France – Bob Godfrey
- 1989 : Book toon – by Jacques-Rémy Girerd
- 1989 : Ça n'colle plus – by Vincent Bonnet
- 1989 : Nos adieux au music-hall – by Laurent Pouvaret
- 1989 : La Planète des salades – by Paul Dopff
- 1989 : La Reine cruelle – by Michel Ocelot
- 1989 : Princes and Princesses – by Michel Ocelot

=== Short films of the 1990s ===
- 1990 : Haut pays des neiges – by Bernard Palacios
- 1990 : L'Intrus – by Michel Gauthier
- 1990 : Le Manteau by la vieille dame (Ciné Si) – by Michel Ocelot
- 1990 : Nature morte – by Georges Le Piouffle
- 1991 : Les Effaceurs – by Gérald Frydman – (Belgium/France)
- 1991 : Elles – by Joanna Quinn
- 1991 : L'Encadré – by Manuel Gómez – (Belgium/France)
- 1991 : Hammam – by Florence Miailhe
- 1991 : I love you my Cerise – by Valérie Carmona
- 1991 : L'Elasto Fragmentoplast, Les Quarxs pilote – by Maurice Benayoun, François Schuiten and Benoît Peeters – (Belgium/France)
- 1992 : L'Amour est un poisson – by Éric Vaschetti
- 1992 : La Ballerine and le ramoneur – by Jean Manuel Costa
- 1992 : Le Dressage des nouvelles par Valentin le désossé – by Jean-Christophe Villard
- 1992 : Le Horla – by Fréderic Wojtyczka
- 1992 : Lugne Poe dans l'image – by Dirk Van Devondel
- 1992 : Mondrian Variations – by Jaroslaw Kapuscinski
- 1992 : Le Triangle des Bermudes – by Bruce Krebs and Eric Krebs
- 1992 : Une mission éphémère – Piotr Kamler
- 1992 : Le Wall – by Jean-Loup Felicioli
- 1993 : Le Criminel – by Gianluigi Toccafondo
- 1993 : Noi Siamo zingarelle – by Guionne Leroy
- 1993 : Tableau d’amour – by Bériou
- 1994 : Deux alpinistes – by Bruce Krebs and Pierre Grolleron
- 1994 : Odeur by ville – by Georges Sifianos – (France/Greece)
- 1994 : Histoire by papier – by Jean-Manuel Costa
- 1994 : Histoire extraordinaire by Mme Veuve Kecskemet – by Béla Weisz
- 1994 : Machinerie II – by Michel Digout
- 1994 : Le Moine and le poisson – by Michaël Dudok De Wit
- 1994 : Pedro – by Igor Leon
- 1994 : Un nouveau départ – by Bruce Krebs
- 1994 : Une bonne journée – by Matthias Bruhn
- 1994 : Variations – by Daniel Borenstein
- 1994 : Voleur d’écran – by Michel Aurousseau, Hervé Huneau and Guy Tual
- 1995 : L'Abri – by Arnaud Pendrié
- 1995 : La Grande migration – by Iouri Tcherenkov
- 1995 : Paroles en l'air – by Sylvain Vincendeau
- 1995 : Terra Incognita – by Olivier Cotte
- 1995 : Schéhérazade – by Florence Miailhe
- 1996 : ADN – by Patrice Chéreau and Marc Thonon
- 1996 : Déjeuner sur l'herbe – by Bruce Krebs
- 1996 : L'Égoïste – by Alain Gagnol and Jean-Loup Felicioli
- 1996 : Ferrailles – by Laurent Pouvaret
- 1996 : La Petite Sirène – by André Lindon
- 1996 : Silenzio and Tralala – by Pierre Clément
- 1996 : Silicose vallée – by Didier Guyard
- 1996 : Taxi by nuit – by Marco Castilla
- 1996 : Toro by nuit – by Philippe Archer
- 1997 : Le Chat – by Benjamin Fleury
- 1997 : Chéri, viens voir ! – by Claire Fouquet
- 1997 : Du tableau noir à l'écran blanc – by Paul Dopff
- 1997 : Dernière invention – by Lolo Zazar
- 1997 : Du Sel pour les œufs ! – by Jean-Pascal Princiaux
- 1997 : L'Envol des frères Wright – by Stéphane Roche and Fabrice Turrier
- 1997 : Gudule – by Sylvie Guérard
- 1997 : L'Homme aux bras ballants – by Laurent Gorgiard
- 1997 : Hors-jeu – by Éric Belliardo
- 1997 : Marcel attaque – by Diane Delavallée
- 1997 : Paint Movie – by Rafaël Gray
- 1997 : Pings 1 – by Pierre Coffin
- 1997 : Pings 2 – by Pierre Coffin
- 1997 : Le Roman by mon âme – by Solweig Von Kleist
- 1997 : Un jour – by Marie Paccou
- 1997 : La Vache qui voulait sauter par-dessus l'église – by Guillaume Casset
- 1997 : Vilain Crapaud – by David Garcia
- 1997 : 23, rue des Martyrs – by Luc Perez
- 1997 : Ziboo – by Christophe Devaux and Christos Kokkinidis
- 1997 : Zob by Moor – by François Perreau and Franck Guillou
- 1998 : Amour… by gare – by Rémi Lucas
- 1998 : Au bout du monde – by Konstantin Bronzit
- 1998 : La Bouche cousue – by Jean-Luc Gréco and Catherine Buffat
- 1998 : Captain Scott – by Arnaud Maironi
- 1998 : Carnavallée – by Aline Ahond
- 1998 : Le Cavalier bleu – by Bertrand Mandico
- 1998 : Le Chat d'appartement – by Sarah Roper
- 1998 : Cloison – by Bériou
- 1998 : Le Cyclope by la mer – by Philippe Jullien
- 1998 : Eden – by Diane Delavallée
- 1998 : Mon Île, c'est le paradis – by Franck Guillem
- 1998 : Mon placard – by Stéphane Blanquet and Stéphanie Michel
- 1998 : La Neige qui tombe – by Stéphane Roche
- 1998 : L'Œil du loup – by Hoël Caouissin
- 1998 : La Vieille Dame and les Pigeons – by Sylvain Chomet
- 1998 : Viva la Muerte – by Laurent Gorgiard
- 1999 : A Summer Night Rendez-vous (Au premier dimanche d'août) – by Florence Miaïlhe
- 1999 : Harold's Planet – by Serge Elissalde
- 1999 : Joyeux Anniversaire – by Darielle Tillon
- 1999 : Maaz – by Christian Volckman
- 1999 : Les Misérables – by Geoffroy by Crécy
- 1999 : Les Noces by Viardot – by Jean Rubak
- 1999 : Nous sommes immortels – by Daniel Guyonnet
- 1999 : Paf le Moustique – by Jérôme Calvet and Jean-François Bourrel
- 1999 : Ponpon – by Fabien Drouet
- 1999 : Premier domicile connu – by Laurent Bénégui
- 1999 : Le Puits – by Jérôme Boulbès
- 1999 : Share Brothers – by Guillaume Le Gouill
- 1999 : Squat – by Savin Yeatman-Eiffel
- 1999 : Tant qu'il y aura des pommes – by Manuel Otéro
- 1999 : The Gnome's Quest – by Pierre Coffin and Jean-Colas Prunier – (Japan/France)
- 1999 : Un couteau dans les fourchettes – by Jean-Loup Felicioli and Alain Gagnol

=== Short films of the 2000s ===
- 2000 : Ainsi font... – by Sébastien Chort, Paul Guerillon, Florence Pernet
- 2000 : Le Bain – by Florent Mounier
- 2000 : La Danse des asperges sarrasines – by Christophe Le Borgne
- 2000 : Disparitions – by Claire Fouquet
- 2000 : Des Plofs à Noireilles – by Pauline Rebufat
- 2000 : L'Enfant by la haute mer – by Laëtitia Gabrielli, Pierre Marteel, Mathieu Renoux and Max Tourret
- 2000 : L'Escargot by Marion – by Manuel Hauss, Sophie Penziki, Mathieu Pavageau, Pierre Lutic, Charles Beirnaert
- 2000 : Fini Zayo – by Catherine Buffat and Jean-Luc Gréco
- 2000 : Geraldine – by Arthur by Pins
- 2000 : Les Oiseaux en cage ne peuvent pas voler – by Luis Briceno
- 2000 : On n'est pas des sauvages ! – by Aline Ahond, Marie-Christine Perrodin, Philippe Jullien and Guillaume Casset
- 2000 : Raoul and Jocelyne – by Serge Elissalde
- 2000 : Révolution – by Manuel Otéro
- 2000 : Ronde – by Fabrice Piéton
- 2000 : Tadeus – by Philippe Jullien and Jean-Pierre Lemouland
- 2000 : Le Train en marche – by Robert Sahakiants (France/Armenia)
- 2000 : Tutu – by Pascal Dalet and Georges Sifianos
- 2000 : Zèbres – by Bruce Krebs
- 2001 : Bas les masses – by Arnaud Pendrie
- 2001 : La Belle au bois d'or – by Bernard Palacios
- 2001 : Le Conte du monde flottant – by Alain Escalle – (France/Japan)
- 2001 : La Fabrik – by Yann Jouette
- 2001 : Les Filles, l'âne and les bœufs – by Francine Chassagnac
- 2001 : Icebergclub – by Jean-Pascal Princiaux
- 2001 : La Mort by Tau – by Jérôme Boulbès
- 2001 : Le Nez à la fenêtre – by Alain Gagnol and Jean-Loup Felicioli
- 2001 : Noé Noé – by Manuel Hauss
- 2001 : Petite escapade – by Pierre-Luc Granjon
- 2001 : Le Petit Vélo dans la tête – by Fabrice Fouquet
- 2001 : Sommeils – by Ira Vicari
- 2001 : Toro Loco – by Manuel Otéro
- 2001 : Tso-ji – by Jean-young Kim
- 2001 : Un âne – by Aline Ahond
- 2001 : Zodiac – by Oerd Van Cuijlenborg
- 2002 : La Cancion du microsillon – by Laurent Pouvaret
- 2002 : Cœur en panne – by Bruce Krebs, Pierre Veck and Pierre Grolleron
- 2002 : La Femme papillon – by Virginie Bourdin – (Belgium/France)
- 2002 : François le Vaillant – by Carles Porta
- 2002 : Le Jardin – by Marie Paccou
- 2002 : Jean Paille – by Marc Ménager
- 2002 : Ligne by vie – by Serge Avédikian
- 2002 : Le Papillon – by Antoine Antin and Jenny Rakotomamonjy
- 2002 : Insult to Injury – by Sébastien Cazes
- 2002 : L'Odeur du chien mouillé – by Éric Montchaud
- 2002 : Les Oiseaux blancs, les oiseaux noirs – by Florence Miailhe
- 2002 : Le Trop petit prince – by Zoïa Trofimova
- 2003 : Bip-Bip – by Romain Segaud
- 2003 : Casa – by Sylvie Léonard
- 2003 : Calypso Is Like So – by Bruno Collet
- 2003 : Le Château des autres – by Pierre-Luc Granjon
- 2003 : Circuit marine – by Isabelle Favez – (France/Canada)
- 2003 : Destino – by Dominique Monféry – (France/United Kingdom)
- 2003 : Circuit Marine – by Isabelle Favez
- 2003 : L'Écrivain – by Frits Standaert – (France/Belgium)
- 2003 : Electronic Performers – by Arnaud Ganzerli, Laurent Bourdoiseau and Jérôme Blanquet
- 2003 : Merveilleusement gris – by Geoffroy Barbet Massin
- 2003 : Patates – by Éric Reynier
- 2003 : Le Portefeuille – by Vincent Bierrewaerts – (Belgium/France)
- 2003 : Pour faire le portrait d’un loup – by Philippe Petit-Roulet
- 2003 : Raging Blues – by Vincent Paronnaud and Lyonel Mathieu
- 2003 : Rascagnes – by Jérôme Boulbès
- 2003 : La Routine – by Cédric Babouche
- 2003 : Salace – by Pierre Tasso
- 2003 : Spirale – by Michael Le Meur
- 2003 : Tueurs français – by Nicolas Jacquet
- 2004 : 2002 nature – by Bruce Krebs
- 2004 : L'Ami y'a bon – by Rachid Bouchareb
- 2004 : L'Attaque des pieds by l'espace – by Yann Jouette
- 2004 : La Dernière minute – by Nicolas Salis
- 2004 : Des câlins dans la cuisine – by Sébastien Laudenbach
- 2004 : L'Éléphant and les quatre aveugles – by Vladimir Petkevitch
- 2004 : L'Inventaire fantôme – by Franck Dion
- 2004 : La Parole by vie – by Pierre La Police
- 2004 : La Poupée cassée – by Louise-Marie Colon – (Belgium/France)
- 2004 : Le Régulateur – by Philippe Grammaticopoulos
- 2004 : La Révolution des crabes – by Arthur by Pins
- 2004 : Sept tonnes deux – by Nicolas Deveaux
- 2004 : Signes by vie – by Arnaud Demuynck – (France/Belgium)
- 2004 : Une histoire vertébrale – by Jérémy Clapin
- 2005 : À l'époque… – by Nadine Buss
- 2005 : Le Building – Marco Nguyen, Pierre Perifel, Xavier Ramonède, Olivier Staphylas, and Rémi Zaarour.
- 2005 : Chahut – by Gilles Cuvelier – (France/Belgium)
- 2005 : La Chute by l'ange – by Geoffroy Barbet Massin
- 2005 : Le Couloir – by Jean-Loup Felicioli and Alain Gagnol
- 2005 : Dies irae – by Jean-Gabriel Périot
- 2005 : Le Fumeur by cigare – by Antoine Roegiers
- 2005 : Le Génie by la boîte by raviolis – by Claude Barras
- 2005 : L'Harmonie cosmique – by Jean-Marc Rohart
- 2005 : Histoire tragique avec fin heureuse – by Regina Pessoa – (France/Canada/Portugal)
- 2005 : Imago... – by Cédric Babouche
- 2005 : James Monde – by Soandsau
- 2005 : Ligne verte – by Laurent Mareschal
- 2005 : Ma bohème – by Jean-Yves Parent, Mickaël Moercant and Joël Pinto
- 2005 : Marottes – by Benoît Razy
- 2005 : Nature morte – by Dominique Hoareau
- 2005 : Novecento : Pianiste – by Sarah Van den Boom
- 2005 : Les Proverbes flamands – by Antoine Roegiers
- 2005 : Ruzz and Ben (Ruzz et Ben) – by Philippe Jullien
- 2005 : Sucré – by Gaël Brisou
- 2005 : La Tête dans les étoiles – by Sylvain Vincendeau
- 2005 : Un beau matin – by Serge Avédikian
- 2006 : Dog Days – by Geoffroy by Crécy
- 2006 : Éclosion – by Jérôme Boulbès
- 2006 : L'Homme by la lune – by Serge Elissalde
- 2006 : Laïka 1957 – by Khaï-dong Luong and Bruno Bonhoure
- 2006 : Mauvais Temps – by Alain Gagnol and Jean-Loup Felicioli
- 2006 : Même en rêve – by Alice Taylor
- 2006 : Même les pigeons vont au paradis – by Samuel Tourneux – (France)
- 2006 : Morceau – by Sébastien Laudenbach
- 2006 : Raymond – by Fabrice Le Nezet, François Roisin, Jules Janaud – (France/United Kingdom)
- 2006 : Street Life – by Kosal Sok
- 2006 : The Return of Sergeant Pecker – by Pierre Delarue
- 2006 : Une petite histoire by l'image animée – by Joris Clerté à voir sur le site by Mikros image en QuickTime ou en Flash
- 2007 : Arrosez-les bien ! – by Christelle Soutif
- 2007 : Aubade – by Pierre Bourrigault
- 2007 : Bâmiyân – by Patrick Pleutin
- 2007 : Berni's Doll – by Yann J.
- 2007 : Boby le zombie – by Loïc Guetat
- 2007 : Ça ne rime à rien – by Claude Duty
- 2007 : Christmas Time Is Here – by Sébastien Lasserre
- 2007 : Contre la montre – by Michaël Le Meur
- 2007 : L'Homme est le seul oiseau qui porte sa cage – by Claude Weiss
- 2007 : Je suis une voix – by Cécile Rousset and Jeanne Paturle
- 2007 : Le jour by gloire... – by Bruno Collet
- 2007 : Le Manteau – by Orlanda Laforêt
- 2007 : Nijuman no Borei – by Jean-Gabriel Périot
- 2007 : Portraits ratés à Sainte-Hélène – by Cédric Villain
- 2007 : Premier voyage – by Grégoire Sivan
- 2007 : Prof Nieto Show: Lesson 3 (Cuniculus) – by Luis Nieto
- 2007 : Soudain – by Vân Ta-minh
- 2007 : Oktapodi – by Julien Bocabeille, François-Xavier Chanioux, Olivier Delabarre, Thierry Marchand, Quentin Marmier and Emud Mokhberi – (France)
- 2007 : La Saint Festin – by Anne-Laure Daffis and Léo Marchand
- 2007 : Le Vol du poisson – by Nicolas Jacquet
- 2008 : Le Cœur d'Amos Klein – by Uri Kranot and Michelle Kranot
- 2008 : En attendant – by Richard Negre
- 2008 : Escale – by Éléa Gobbé-Mévellec
- 2008 : Fêlures – by Alexis Ducord and Nicolas Pawlowski
- 2008 : French Roast – by Fabrice O. Joubert – (France)
- 2008 : Inukshuk – by Camillelvis Thery
- 2008 : Jazzed – by Anton Setola – (Belgium/France/Netherlands)
- 2008 : Mon chinois – by Cédric Villain
- 2008 : Monsieur COK – by Franck Dion
- 2008 : Morana – by Simon Bogojevic Narath – (France/Croatia)
- 2008 : Nuvole, Mani – by Simone Massi
- 2008 : L'Ondée – by David Coquard-Dassault
- 2008 : Popolei – by Frédéric Mayer
- 2008 : Rosa Rosa – by Félix Dufour-Laperrière
- 2008 : Shaman – by Luc Perez – (Denmark/France)
- 2008 : Skhizein – by Jérémy Clapin
- 2008 : La Vita nuova – by Christophe Gautry and Arnaud Demuynck – (France/Belgium)
- 2009 : Adieu général – by Luis Briceno
- 2009 : Le Bûcheron des mots – by Izù Troin
- 2009 : J'ai encore rêvé d'elle – by Geoffroy Barbet Massin
- 2009 : Jean-François – by Tom Haugomat and Bruno Mangyoku
- 2009 : Je criais contre la vie. Ou pour elle – by Vergine Keaton
- 2009 : Les Escargots by Joseph – by Sophie Roze
- 2009 : Fard – by David Alapont and Luis Briceno
- 2009 : La Femme-squelette – by Sarah Van den Boom
- 2009 : L'Homme à la Gordini – by Jean-Christophe Lie
- 2009 : Logorama – du studio H5 – (France)
- 2009 : Masques - by Jérôme Boulbès
- 2009 : Madagascar, carnet de Voyage – by Bastien Dubois – (France)
- 2009 : Mei Ling – by Stéphanie Lansaque and François Leroy
- 2009 : Mémoire fossile – by Anne-Laure Totaro and Arnaud Demuynck – (France/Belgium)
- 2009 : Monstre sacré – by Jean-Claude Rozec
- 2009 : L'Oiseau – by Samuel Yal
- 2009 : Le Petit Dragon – by Bruno Collet – (France/Switzerland)
- 2009 : La Promenade du dimanche – by José Miguel Ribeiro
- 2009 : Regarder Oana – by Sébastien Laudenbach – (France/Belgium)
- 2009 : Le Silence sous l'écorce – by Joanna Lurie
- 2009 : Ru – by Florentine Grelier
- 2009 : Thé noir – by Serge Elissalde
- 2009 : Une nouvelle vie ! – by Fred Joyeux
- 2009 : Les Ventres – by Philippe Grammaticopoulos
- 2009 : Yulia – by Antoine Arditti

=== Short films of the 2010s ===
- 2010 : Après moi – by Paul-Émile Boucher, Thomas Bozovic, Madeleine Charruaud, Dorianne Fibleuil, Benjamin Flouw, Mickaël Riciotti and Antoine Robert
- 2010 : Babioles – by Mathieu Auvray
- 2010 : Chienne d'histoire – by Serge Avédikian
- 2010 : Chroniques by la poisse – by Osman Cerfon
- 2010 : Cliché ! – by Cédric Villain
- 2010 : Le Cirque – by Nicolas Brault
- 2010 : Les Ciseaux pointus – by Laurent Foudrot
- 2010 : Cul by bouteille – by Jean-Claude Rozec
- 2010 : Daniel, une vie en bouteille – by Emmanuel Briand, Louis Tardivier and Antoine Tardivier
- 2010 : La Détente – by Pierre Ducos and Bertrand Bey
- 2010 : Dripped – by Léo Verrier
- 2010 : Ego sum petrus – by Julien Dexant
- 2010 : La Femme à cordes – by Vladimir Mavounia-Kouka – (France/Belgium)
- 2010 : La Femme du lac – by Mathilde Philippon-Aginski
- 2010 : Françoise – by Elsa Duhamel
- 2010 : L'Inventeur – by Gary Fouchy, Jérémy Guerrieri, Paul Jaulmes, Nicolas Leroy, Leslie Martin, Maud Sertour etAlexandre Toufaili
- 2010 : Le Loup à poil – by Joke Van Der Steen and Valère Lommel
- 2010 : Love patate – by Gilles Cuvelier
- 2010 : Miss Daisy Cutter – by Laen Sanches
- 2010 : Muzorama – by Elsa Bréhin, Raphaël Calamote, Mauro Carraro, Maxime Cazaux, Émilien Davaud, Laurent Monneron, Axel Tillement
- 2010 : Pixels – by Patrick Jean
- 2010 : Rubika
- 2010 : Vasco – by Sébastien Laudenbach
- 2010 : La Vénus by Rabo – by François Bertin
- 2010 : The Waterwalk – by Johannes Ridder
- 2011 : Aalterate – by Christobal by Oliveira – (France/Netherlands)
- 2011 : Bao – by Sandra Desmazieres
- 2011 : Bisclavret – by Émilie Mercier
- 2011 : Chase – by Adriaan Lokman – (France/Netherlands)
- 2011 : De riz ou d'Arménie – by Hélène Marchal
- 2011 : Dripped – by Léo Verrier
- 2011 : Fire Waltz – by Marc Ménager
- 2011 : La Douce – by Anne Larricq
- 2011 : Le coût by la colonne – by Cédric Villain
- 2011 : Les Conquérants – by Sarolta Szabo and Tibor Banoczki
- 2011 : L'Histoire du petit Paolo – by Nicolas Liguori – (Belgium/France)
- 2011 : Mourir auprès by toi – by Spike Jonze and Simon Cahn
- 2011 : Une Seconde par jour – by Richard Negre
- 2012 : Au poil – by Hélène Friren
- 2012 : Ceux d'en haut – by Izù Troin
- 2012 : 5:46 am – by Olivier Campagne and Vivien Balzi
- 2012 : Cinq mètres quatre-vingt – by Nicolas Deveaux
- 2012 : Comme des lapins – by Osman Cerfon
- 2012 : Edmond était un âne – by Franck Dion – (France/Canada)
- 2012 : Kali le petit vampire – by Regina Pessoa
- 2012 : La Queste de Digduguesclin – by Sébastien Lasserre
- 2012 : Le Banquet by la concubine – by Hefang Wei – (France/Canada/Switzerland)
- 2012 : Le Printemps – by Jérôme Boulbès
- 2012 : Les Souvenirs – by Renaud Martin
- 2012 : Mademoiselle Kiki and les Montparnos – by Amélie Harrault
- 2012 : Merci mon chien – by Julie Rembauville and Nicolas Bianco-Levrin
- 2012 : N'Djekoh – by Grégory Sukiennik
- 2012 : Palmipedarium – by Jérémy Clapin
- 2012 : Peau by chien – by Nicolas Jacquet
- 2012 : Pixel Joy – by Florentine Grelier
- 2012 : Premier automne – by Aude Danset and Carlos by Carvalho
- 2012 : Tram – by Michaela Pavlátová – (France/Czech Republic)
- 2012 : The Caketrope of Burton's Team – by Alexandre Dubosc
- 2012 : The People Who Never Stop – by Florian Piento – (France/Japan)
- 2013 : Betty's Blues – by Rémi Vandenitte – (France/Belgium)
- 2013 : Braise – by Hugo Frassetto
- 2013 : Cargo Cult – by Bastien Dubois
- 2013 : El canto – by Inès Sedan
- 2013 : Gli immacolati – by Ronny Trocker
- 2013 : La Grosse Bête – by Pierre-Luc Granjon
- 2013 : Hasta Santiago – by Mauro Carraro – (France/Switzerland)
- 2013 : Lonely Bones – by Rosto – (France/Netherlands)
- 2013 : Lettres by femmes – by Augusto Zanovello
- 2013 : La Maison by poussière – by Jean-Claude Rozec
- 2013 : Maman – by Ugo Bienvenu and Kevin Manach
- 2013 : Marchant grenu – by François Vogel
- 2013 : Méandres – by Élodie Bouédec, Florence Miailhe and Mathilde Philippon-Aginski
- 2013 : Mr Hublot – by Laurent Witz and Alexandre Espigares – (France/Luxembourg)
- 2013 : Mustapha and la clématite – by Sabine Allard and Marie-Jo Long
- 2013 : Nain géant – by Fabienne Giezendanner – (France/Switzerland)
- 2013 : Padre by Santiago Bou Grasso – (France/Argentina)
- 2013 : Professor Kliq - Wire and Flashing Lights – by Victor Haeglin
- 2013 : Sneh – by Ivana Ebestová – (France/Slovakia)
- 2013 : Sonata – by Nadia Micault
- 2013 : Vigia – by Marcel Barelli – (France/Switzerland)
- 2013 : Les Voiles du partage – by Pierre Mousquet and Jérôme Cauwe – (France/Belgium)
- 2014 : La Chair by ma chère – by Antoine Blandin
- 2014 : La Faillite – by Jean-Jean Arnoux
- 2014 : Invasion – by Hugo Ramirez and Olivier Patté
- 2014 : Man on the Chair – by Dahee Jeong – (France/South Korea)
- 2014 : La Petite Casserole d'Anatole – by Éric Montchaud
- 2014 : Le Sens du toucher – by Jean-Charles Mbotti Malolo – (France/Switzerland)
- 2014 : Tempête sur anorak – by Paul Cabon
- 2014 : Wonder – by Mirai Mizue – (France/Japan)

== See also ==
- History of animation
- Annecy International Animated Film Festival
