= Ode (ballet) =

Ballet by Nicolas Nabokov

- Choreographer: Léonide Massine
- Music: Nicolas Nabokov
- Based on: verses by Mikhail Lomonosov, libretto by Boris Kochno
- Premiere: 6 June 1928; Sarah Bernhardt Theater, Paris
- Original ballet company: Ballets Russes
- Design: Pavel Tchelitchew (set design), Pierre Charbonnier (light projection)
- Genre: ballet-oratorio

Ode is a ballet-oratorio by Nicolas Nabokov, the first major musical work by the composer. It was created for Serge Diaghilev's Ballets Russes, with choreography by Léonide Massine, a scenario by Boris Kochno (based on verses of Mikhail Lomonosov Evening meditation on God's majesty on the occasion of the great northern lights), stage design by Pavel Tchelitchew, and light projections by Pierre Charbonnier. The ballet was premiered on June 6, 1928, in Paris, at the Sarah Bernhardt Theater. The orchestra was conducted by Roger Désormière.

- Apprentice (Poet and Glare of Light) – Serge Lifar
- Nature – Irina Bellin (Beliankina, niece of Igor Stravinsky)
- Participants in the Festival of Nature – Felia Doubrovska, Alice Nikitina, Alexandra Danilova, Léonide Massine, Nikolai Efimov, Konstantin Cherkas, Leon Woizikovsky.

== Literature ==
- Norton L. Léonid Massine and 20th Century Ballet. McFarland & Company, 2004
