= Détente (disambiguation) =

Détente (French for 'relaxation') is the easing of strained relations, especially in a political situation.

Détente may also refer to:

- La Détente, French short film
- Detente (band), American metal band
- Détente (book), book by former director of Radio Free Europe, George R. Urban
- Detente (album), a 1980 album by the Brecker Brothers

== See also ==
- Detente bala, an inscription used by Spanish soldiers
