= Robert Collard =

Robert Alphonse Collard (November 19, 1884 – April 10, 1973), also known as Robert Lortac or simply Lortac, was a French writer, illustrator, portraitist, animator, and art critic. He was born in Cherbourg and died in Paris.

== Biography ==
During his youth Collard produced cartoon and caricatures for periodicals such as Bon Vivant, Le Petit Illustré amusant and Fillette. Lorac began his first animated cartoon in 1914. After meeting with Émile Cohl, he created his own production company in 1916. The Lortac workshop was in the 1920s a rich crucible – the only one in France at the time – where the young animators of the time learned their craft. Notable names included: Antoine Payen, André Rigal, Chaval and Ragonneau. He made several cartoons of fiction that the Pathé company later incorporated into the 9.5 mm Pathé-Baby film library. Among the best known, one can mention La Cigale et la fourmi (The Grasshopper and the ant), Le Lion et le rat (The Lion and the Rat), and Toto cuisinier.

In 1922, he published a satirical daily newspaper in cartoons entitled Le Canard en ciné, screened in theaters with the news Pathé.

He is also known to have written under his name the novel Demonax, which he illustrated (Tallandier – Great Adventures, 3rd series, no. 16) in 1938. He also publishes detective and science fiction novels, including L'aventures commence ton soir (Éditions Colbert) in 1943, and Les bagnards du ciel (Éditions Métal no 4) in 1954.

== See also ==
- Histoire de Monsieur Vieux-Bois

== Sources ==
- Eric Le Roy, « Filmographies Robert Lortac », 1895. Mille huit cent quatre-vingt-quinze, no 59, 2009, p. 289-324 (lire en ligne [archive])
- Biographie de Lortac sur le site Les Indépendants du Premier siècle [archive]
