= The Tale of the Fox =

1930 film by Ladislas Starevich

- Original French poster
- Directed by: Ladislas Starevich; Irène Starevich
- Screenplay by: Roger Richebé; Jean Nohain (dialogue); Antoinette Nordmann (dialogue)
- Story by: Irène Starevich
- Based on: Reynard the Fox
- Produced by: Louis Nalpas (1929–1931); Roger Richebé (1939–1941)
- Starring: Claude Dauphin; Romain Bouquet; Laine; Sylvain Itkine; Léon Larive
- Cinematography: Ladislas Starevich
- Edited by: Laura Sejourné
- Music by: Vincent Scotto
- Release dates: 10 April 1937 (Germany); 10 April 1941 (France)
- Running time: 65 minutes
- Country: France
- Languages: German (1937); French (1941)

The Tale of the Fox (French: Le Roman de Renard; Dutch: Van den vos Reynaerde; German: Reineke Fuchs) was stop-motion animation pioneer Ladislas Starevich's first fully animated feature film. The film is based on the tales of Renard the Fox. Although the animation was finished in Paris after an 18-month period (1929–1930), there were major problems with adding a soundtrack to the film. Finally, funding was given for a German soundtrack by the UFA—Goethe had written a classic version of the Renard legend—and this version had its premiere in Berlin in April 1937.

Released eight months before Walt Disney's Snow White and the Seven Dwarfs, it is the world's eighth-ever animated feature film (Note: By release date (1937). It was the sixth animated film ever produced when completed in 1930.) (and the third surviving animated film, as well as the second to use puppet animation, following The New Gulliver from the USSR). The film was released in France with a French language soundtrack in 1941; this is the version which is currently available on DVD.

== Plot ==
In the kingdom of animals, the fox Renard is used to tricking and fooling everyone. Consequently, the King (a lion) receives more and more complaints. Finally, he orders Renard to be arrested and brought before the throne.

== Voice cast ==
- Claude Dauphin as Monkey.
- Romain Bouquet as Fox.
- Laine as Lion.
- Sylvain Itkine as Wolf.
- Léon Larive as Bear.
- Robert Seller as Cock.
- Eddy Debray as Badger.
- Nicolas Amato as Cat.
- Pons as Donkey.
- Sylvia Bataille as Rabbit.
- Suzy Dornac as Fox Cub.
- Jaime Plama as Cat. (singing voice)

== Reception ==
On the review aggregator website Rotten Tomatoes, 100% of 5 critics' reviews are positive, with an average rating of 10/10.

== See also ==
- History of French animation
- List of animated feature-length films
- List of stop-motion films
