= Johnny the Giant Killer =

1950 French animated film

- The poster art for the U.S. theatrical premiere of Johnny the Giant Killer
- Directed by: Jean Image
- Produced by: Jean Image
- Cinematography: Kostia Tchikine
- Music by: René Cloërec
- Production company: Jean Image Films
- Distributed by: Lippert Pictures (United States)
- Release date: 13 December 1950
- Running time: 80 minutes
- Country: France
- Language: French

Johnny the Giant Killer aka Johnny vs the Giant or Johnny Little and the Giant (French: Jeannot l'intrépide) is a 1950 French fantasy animated film directed by Jean Image. The film was made in 1 1/2 years with a very small crew. The first feature-length animated film made in France, the work's music was composed by René Cloërec.

The film won the Venice Film Festival's Grand Prix for children's films, and was picked up for U.S. distribution in 1953 by Lippert Pictures, a company specialising in B-movies.

The bees would later appear in the 1960-1963 television series Joe the Little Boom Boom and the 1973 film of the same name which was released as Johnny in the Valley of the Giants in English-speaking territories.

== Plot ==
Johnny and a troop of boy scouts are camping in a forest. One night Johnny reads a tentful of scouts a fairy tale book about the evil giant. They sneak out to find the giant's castle. The giant captures them all except for Johnny, whom he shrinks to insect size. A bird carries Johnny from the castle to the forest, where he sees the friendly insects of Insect-ville, saves them from a lizard, is captured by spiders, and is rescued by bees. A bee majordomo shows him how bees live. The queen bee favors Johnny, which makes the drones jealous. After Johnny defeats the head drone in a sword fight, the drone sneaks out to help the evil wasps to capture the beehive. Johnny defeats them, and the grateful queen mobilizes all the forest insects into an army to help Johnny defeat the giant and rescue the other boys. Johnny and the boys are restored to full size. The film ends with them returning to the scout camp, with the giant shrunk to insect size in a birdcage as a souvenir.

== See also ==
- List of animated feature-length films
