= Bériou =

French videographer and visual artist

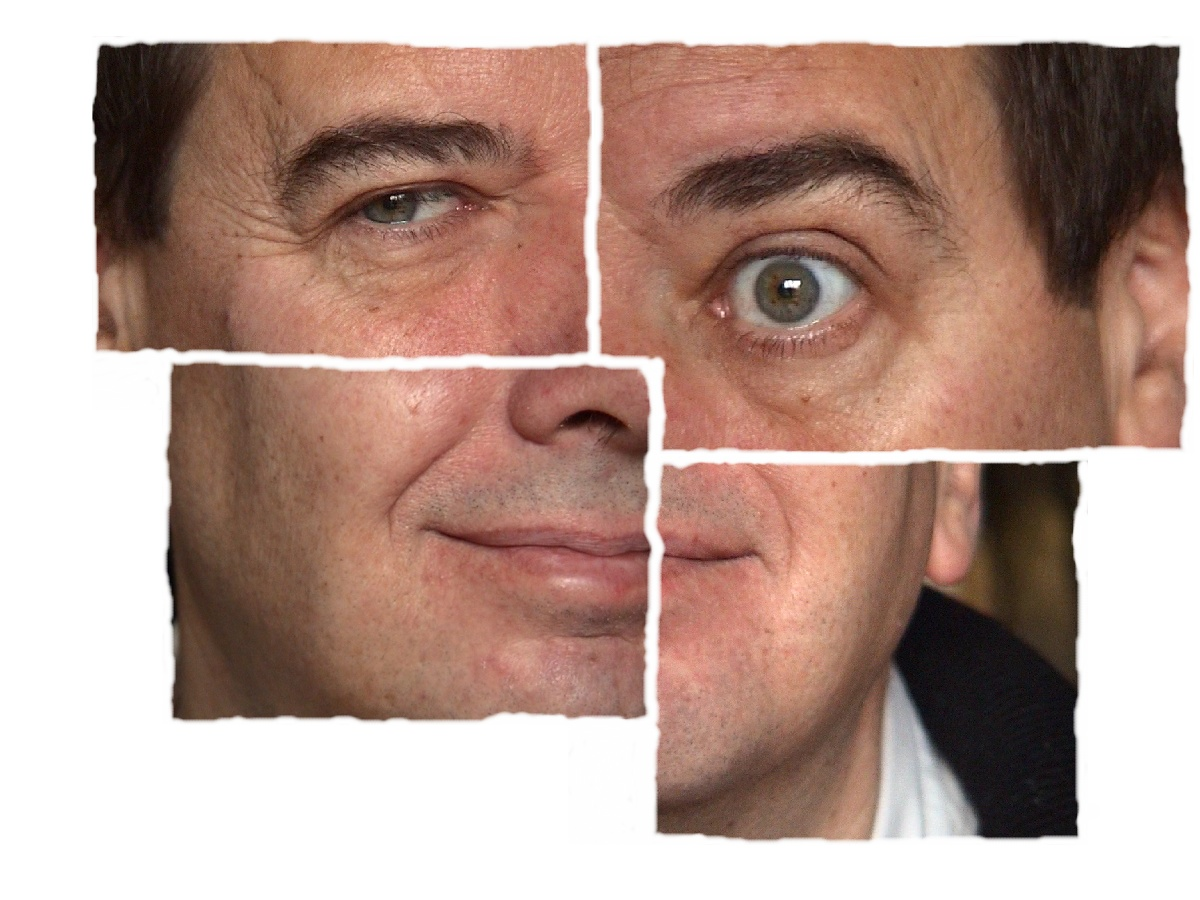
- Born: Jean-François Matteudi; 17 October 1952 (age 73)
- Known for: video, plastic arts
- Notable work: Digitaline (1990), Ex memoriam (1992), Tableau d'amour (1993), Limbes (1995), Cloison (1997)

Bériou, a pseudonym of Jean-François Matteudi, is a French videographer and visual artist born in 1952. Some of his computer generated short films, produced by Canal+ and released in many countries, were widely broadcast in the 1990s.

His work mainly explores questions of hybridization, combinatorics and networks, creating a labyrinthine aesthetic that is difficult to classify but rooted in contemporary concerns.

He has also made documentaries for television and numerous videos involving a wide range of generally marginalized groups.

Bériou holds a PhD in social and cultural anthropology.

== Filmography (main films in computer generated images) ==
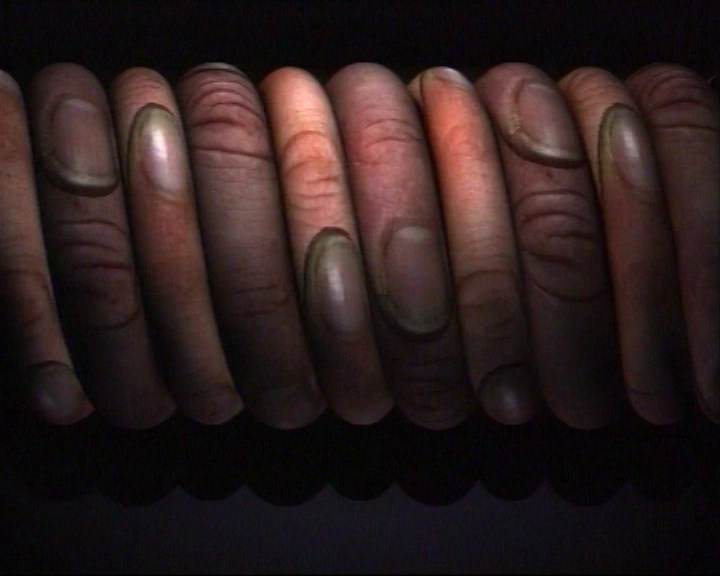
Digitaline (1990)

=== Digitaline (1990) ===
Video and 35 mm film. Duration: 1:30. AGAVE production.

==== Awards ====
- United States: Electronic Theater, SIGGRAPH, Chicago (1991)
- Canada: 1st prize Art, Production 92, Montreal (1991)
- Austria: Award of Distinction, Ars Electronica, Linz (1992)

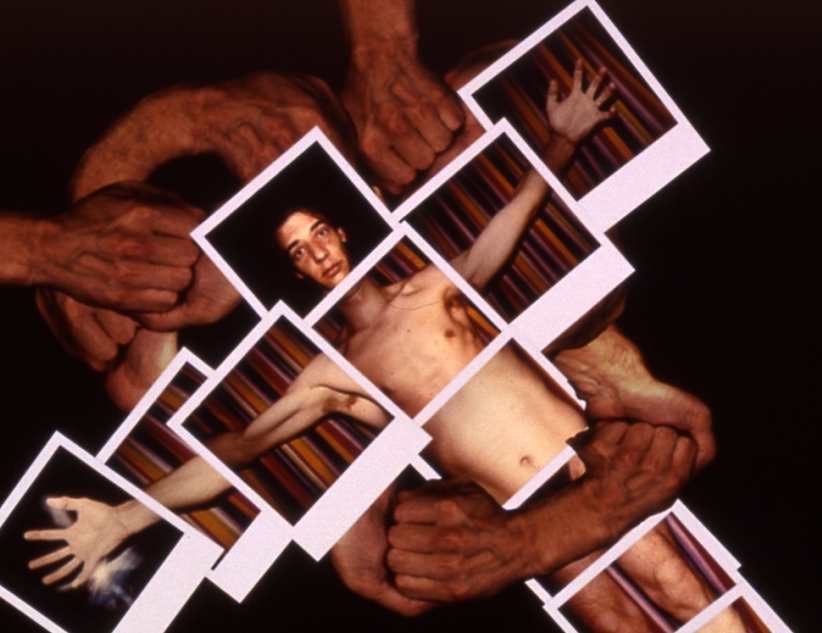
Ex memoriam (1992)

=== Ex memoriam (1992) ===
Video and 35 mm film. Duration: 5:10. AGAVE Production, with the participation of CANAL+ and the Centre National de la Cinématographie (Nouvelles Technologies et Compte de soutien), and the support of the PROCIREP Television Commission.

==== Awards ====
- United States: Electronic Theater, SIGGRAPH, Chicago (1992)
- Japan: Multimedia Grand Prize "Computer Graphics", Nicograph, Tokyo (1993)
- Monaco: 1st Prize "Art", Imagina (1993)
- Quebec: 1st prize "Art", Images of the Future, Montreal (1993)
- Austria: Award of Distinction, Ars Electronica, Linz (1993)
- France: "Research" Prize, Short Film Festival, Clermont-Ferrand (1993)
- Germany: 2nd prize, Videofest, Berlin (1993)
- France: "Troisième Dimension" Prize, SCAM (1993)
- France: Quality Award, Centre National de la Cinématographie (1994)
- Germany: Prisma Preis, Hamburg (1993)
- Poland: 3rd prize, Wro Festival (1993)

==== Nominations ====
- France: Nomination for the César for best short film (1994)

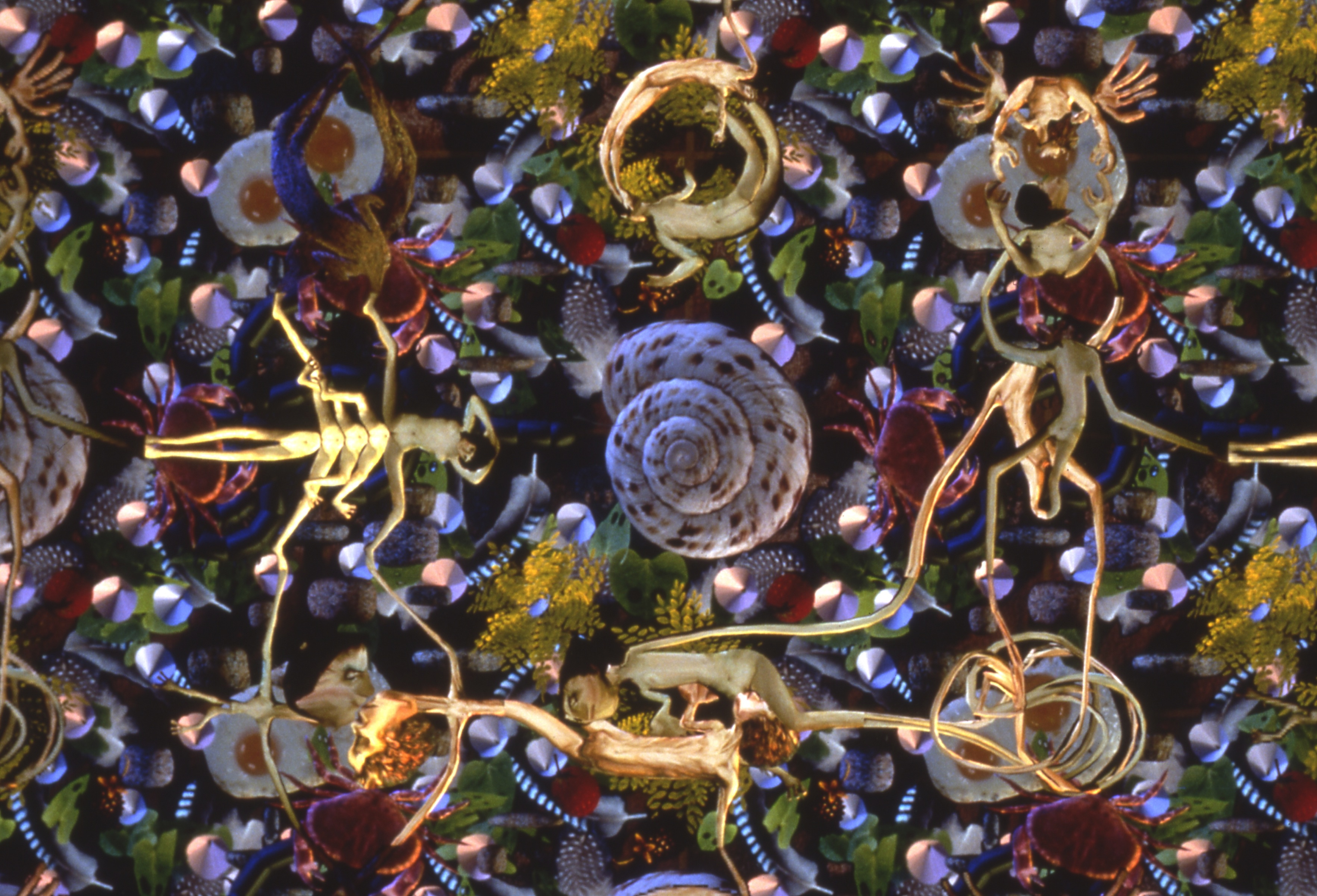
Tableau d'amour (1993)

=== Tableau d’amour (1993) ===
Video and 35 mm film. Duration: 5:25. Coproduction AGAVE, CANAL+ and Club d'Investissement Media (Media Programme of the European Community), with the participation of the Centre National de la Cinématographie (Nouvelles Technologies et Compte de Soutien)

==== Awards ====
- Monaco: 1st prize "Art" and special mention of the CST for the soundtrack, Imagina (1994)
- Japan: Multimedia Grand Prize "Computer Graphics", Nicograph, Tokyo (1994)
- Quebec: 1st prize "Art", Images of the Future, Montreal (1994)
- Austria: Honorary Mention, Ars Electronica, Linz (1994)
- Portugal: Espinho City Prize and Special Jury Prize, Animation Film Festival, Espinho (1994)
- Italy: 1st prize in the "Video Graphics Workstation" section, Bit Movie, Riccione (1994)
- Spain: Accessit Animación Infografica, Anima, Terruel (1994)
- Finland: "Video" section prize, Jazz Bit', Pori (1995)
- Turkey: Art and Cultural Foundation Video Award, Golden Orange, Antalya (1996)

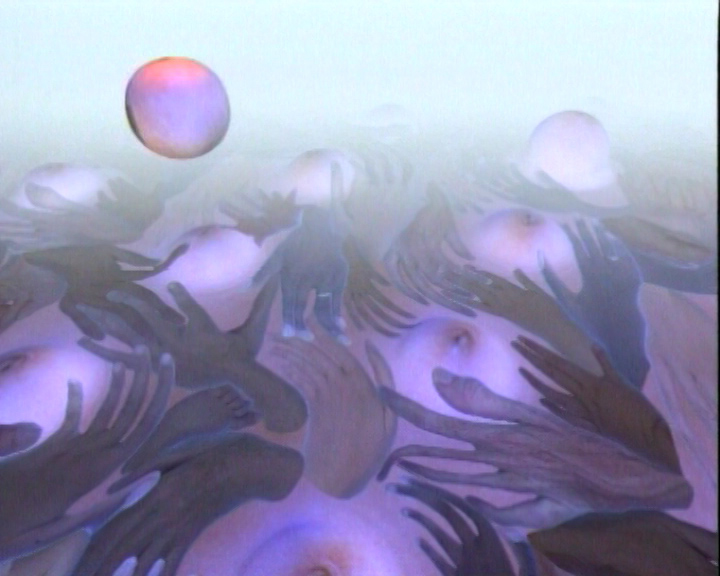
Limbes (1995)

=== Limbes (1995) ===
Video. Duration: 5:25. Coproduction AGAVE and CANAL+, with the participation of the Centre National de la Cinématographie (Nouvelles Technologies et Compte de Soutien à l'Industrie des Programmes Audiovisuels) and the support of the PROCIREP.

==== Awards ====
- Quebec: 1st prize "Art", Images of the Future, Montreal (1996)
- Sweden: Honorary Prize of the Jury, International Short Film Festival, Uppsala (1996)
- Finland: Prize in the "Video Animation" section, Jazz Bit', Pori (1996)
- Hungary: Best Animated Film Award, Hungarian History Film Foundation, Alternative 45, Mures (1996)
- Germany: ZKM Internationaler Videokunstpreis, Baden-Baden (1997)
- France: Quality Award, Centre National de la Cinématographie (1997)
- Korea: "The Prize for Outstanding Film", AnimExpo Korea, Seoul, (1997)

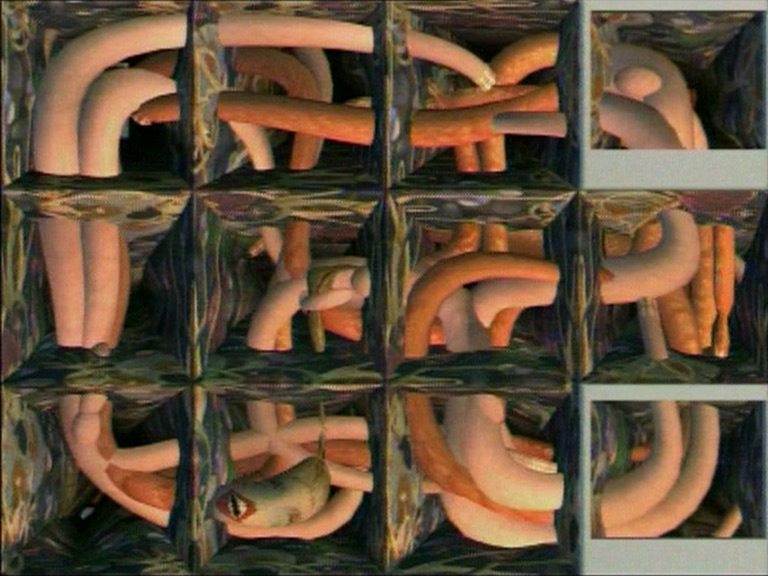
Cloison (1997)

=== Cloison (1997) ===
Video. Duration: 5:03. Co-production AGAVE and CANAL+, with the participation of the Centre National de la Cinématographie (Nouvelles Technologies et Compte de Soutien à l'Industrie des Programmes Audiovisuels).

==== Awards ====
- Japan: Multimedia Grand Prize "Computer Graphics", MMCA (Nicograph), Tokyo (1997)
- United States: Electronic Theater, SIGGRAPH, Orlando (1998)
- Canada: 1st prize "Art" and Public Prize, Cybermonde, Montreal (1998)

== Reviews ==
"Disconcerting and funny, disturbing even in its aesthetic biases, Bériou's work introduces fresh air into the world of synthesis.” Véronique Godé, NOV'ART (1993)

"Personal and profound, Beriou's work stands out, is noticed, touches. His tableaux, his mobile moments, surprise and amaze, sometimes frighten, often disturb but never leave anyone indifferent.” VHR, Dictionnaire du jeune cinéma français : les réalisateurs (1998)
