= Piotr Kamler =

Polish animator and director

Piotr Kamler (born June 30, 1936 in Warsaw, Poland) is a Polish avant-garde animator, director, cinematographer, and writer best known for his films Chronopolis (1982) and The Step (1975).

== Education ==
Kamler began his studies at Academy of Fine Arts, Warsaw later he studied in Paris, where he has spent his subsequent career. He made his first film, Conte, in 1960.

== Chronopolis ==
A stop-motion animated film, Chronopolis, is Kamler's only feature length film and his best known. It took 5 years to finish and was completed in 1982. The film is essentially an experimental science fiction story. It was screened at the Cannes Film Festival the year it was completed, after which Kamler removed all narration and cut 14 minutes from the film.

== Collaborations ==
Many of Kamler's films include collaborations with European avant-garde composers, including members of the Groupe de Recherches Musicales (GRM), including Iannis Xenakis, Bernard Parmegiani, Beatriz Ferreyra, François Bayle, and Luc Ferrari.

== Filmography ==
- Conte (France, 1960)
- L'Interior (France, 1961)
- Etude (France, 1961)
- Continu-Discontinu (France, 1961)
- Danse (France, 1961)
- Lignes et Points (France, 1961)
- Structures (France, 1961)
- Composition (France, 1961)
- Reflets (France, 1961)
- Hiver (France, 1964)
- The Green Planet (France, 1965)
- Etude 65 (France, 1965)
- Tourni (France, 1966)
- Jeu (France, 1966)
- L'Araignelephant (France, 1968)
- Le Trou (France, 1968)
- Meutre (France, 1968)
- Enfance (France, 1968)
- Delicious Catastophe (France, 1970)
- Labyrinthe (France, 1970)
- The Heart (France, 1970)
- Les Pas(The Step) (France, 1975)
- Interlude (with Gerard Marinelli) (France, 1979)
- Chronopolis (Poland, 1982)
- Un Mission Ephemere (France, 1993)
- Continu-Discontinu 2010 (Poland 2011)
- Perpetuem Mobile (Poland, 2015)
