= Cavé =

Cavé is the name of several persons:

- François Cavé (1794–1875), French inventor, namesake of rue Cavé in Paris (fr:François Cavé)
- Hygin-Edmond-Ludovic-Auguste Cavé (1796–1852), French administrator and playwright, subject of Ingres' Portrait de Edmond Cavé
- Marie-Élisabeth Blavot-Boulanger (1806–1883), French artist and intimate of Eugène Delacroix, later Madame Edmond Cavé
- Jean-Cyrille Cavé (1834–1909), French pioneer of free education (fr:Jean-Cyrille Cavé)
- Alan Cavé (born 1966), US kompa singer
