= Chronopolis (film) =

- Title screen
- Directed by: Piotr Kamler
- Written by: Piotr Kamler
- Produced by: Piotr Kamler
- Starring: Michael Lonsdale
- Edited by: Michèle Peju
- Music by: Luc Ferrari
- Distributed by: Saint-André-des-Arts
- Release date: May 1982
- Running time: 52 minutes
- Countries: France; Poland
- Budget: <$400,000

Chronopolis is a 1982 experimental stop motion science fiction film directed by Polish animator Piotr Kamler, with music composed by renowned composer Luc Ferrari, and, originally, narration by Michael Lonsdale. It was Kamler's only full-length film. The film won "Best Children's Film" at Fantafestival in 1982 and "Critics' Award - Special Mention" at Fantasporto, and it was shown out of competition alongside Patrick Bokanowski's L'ange at the 1982 Cannes Film Festival.

== Plot ==
Chronopolis tells the story of a gargantuan city lurking in the sky, colonised by powerful immortals who have become jaded and bored with eternal life, and thus have decided to manipulate elements of time. They play with atomic particles and electricity, and monotonously construct bizarre and unusual objects to assist in this, including a ball that communicates with higher technology, but in reality they are waiting for the ultimate gift to arrive in their hands.

== Production ==
With a grant under $400,000 from the Institut National de l'Audiovisuel of Paris and Centre National du Cinema, Piotr Kamler completed the film within a five-year period from 1977 to 1982. Most of the animation and CGI he accomplished on his own. Kamler openly admitted that the script he provided to obtain his funding had nothing to do with his original concept. Only after building the characters and set did the film's "story" take shape.

There are two versions of the film. The original 1982 version runs at 66 minutes and was released in North America through a company in Boston. The official and final cut, re-released in 1988, has 14 minutes of footage taken out leaving it at 52 minutes. Within that version:

- All of the narration is omitted.
- The scene where the explorer flies around the giants is cut.
- Additional dancing between the explorer and the ball was taken out.
- The ending is cut by 10 minutes which includes extra scenes of the immortals and both the ball and the explorer leaving Chronopolis.
