= Jean Image =

French filmmaker

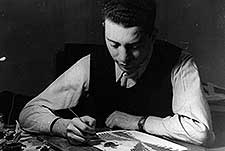
- Born: Imre Hajdú; 26 January 1911; Budapest, Hungary
- Died: 21 October 1989 (aged 78); Paris, France
- Occupations: Animator, Director, Script-writer, Producer
- Years active: 1932–1986
- Spouses: Eraine Image; France Image

Imre Hajdú (Hungarian: [ˈimrɛ ˈhɒjduː]; 26 January 1911 – 21 October 1989) better known by his stage name Jean Image (French: [ʒɑ̃ imaʒ]) was a Hungarian-French director, script writer and producer of French animation films.

His stage name, "Image" is based upon the French pronunciation of "Im-Haj", the first syllables of his name.

In 1959, he participated in the creation of Annecy International Animated Film Festival.

Jean Image was also the author of a book on animation titled Le Dessin animé : initiation à la technique (lit. Animation film: A technical introduction) (1979).

== Career ==
He emigrated to France in 1932 where he worked on films and eventually produced several shorts on his own. After the war, influenced by the classic style of Walt Disney's films, he became the first French producer of the full-length animated film (Johnny the Giant Killer). In 1948, he founded the Films Jean Image company and in 1960 he devoted himself to producing television cartoon series. Two of these series (Kiri le Clown and Joe), have become very popular.

== Personal life ==
His first wife was Eraine Image (born Germaine Suzanne Charvot). He was later married to France Image, with whom he co-wrote his later movies and series.

== Filmography ==
=== Film ===
Year	Film	Director	Producer	Notes
1950	Johnny the Giant Killer	Yes		Debut feature film
1953	Bonjour Paris	Yes		
1970	Aladin et la lampe merveilleuse	Yes		
1973	Joe the Little Boom Boom (Joe petit boum-boum)	Yes		
1979	Little Orbit the Astrodog and the Screechers from Outer Space (Pluk, naufragé de l'espace)	Yes		
1979	Les Fabuleuses Aventures du légendaire baron de Münchhausen	Yes		
1984	Le Secret des sélénites	Yes		

=== Short-film ===
Year	Film	Director	Producer	Notes
1944	Les Noirs jouent et gagnent la révolte des notes	Yes	Yes	short-film
1946	Rhapsodie de Saturne	Yes	Yes	Short-film
1948	Ballade Atomique	Yes	Yes	Short-film
1949	Monsieur Tout-le-Monde	Yes	Yes	Short-film
1954	La Cigale et la fourmi	Yes		short-film
1955	Monsieur Victor ou La Machine à explorer le temps	Yes		Short-film
1956	Le Loup et l'agneau	Yes		Short-film
1956	Un grain de bon sens	Yes		Short-film
1956	L'Aventure du Père Noël	Yes		Short-film
1958	La Petite reine	Yes		Short-film
1974	Le Crayon magique	Yes		Short-film

=== Television ===
- Joe the Little Boom Boom (TV series, 1960 – 1963)
- Joë chez les fourmis (1962)
- La Fontaine des trois soldats, TV series of 26 episodes (1963)
- Joë au royaume des mouches (1964)
- Picolo et Piccolette (1964)
- Kiri le clown (1966)
- Patatomanie (1970)
- Au clair de lune (1971–1972)
- Arago X-001 (1972–1973)
- Le Crayon magique (1973)
- Les Rêves de Jeannot (series, 1985–1986)
