= Benjamin Rabier =

French illustrator and animator (1874–1939)

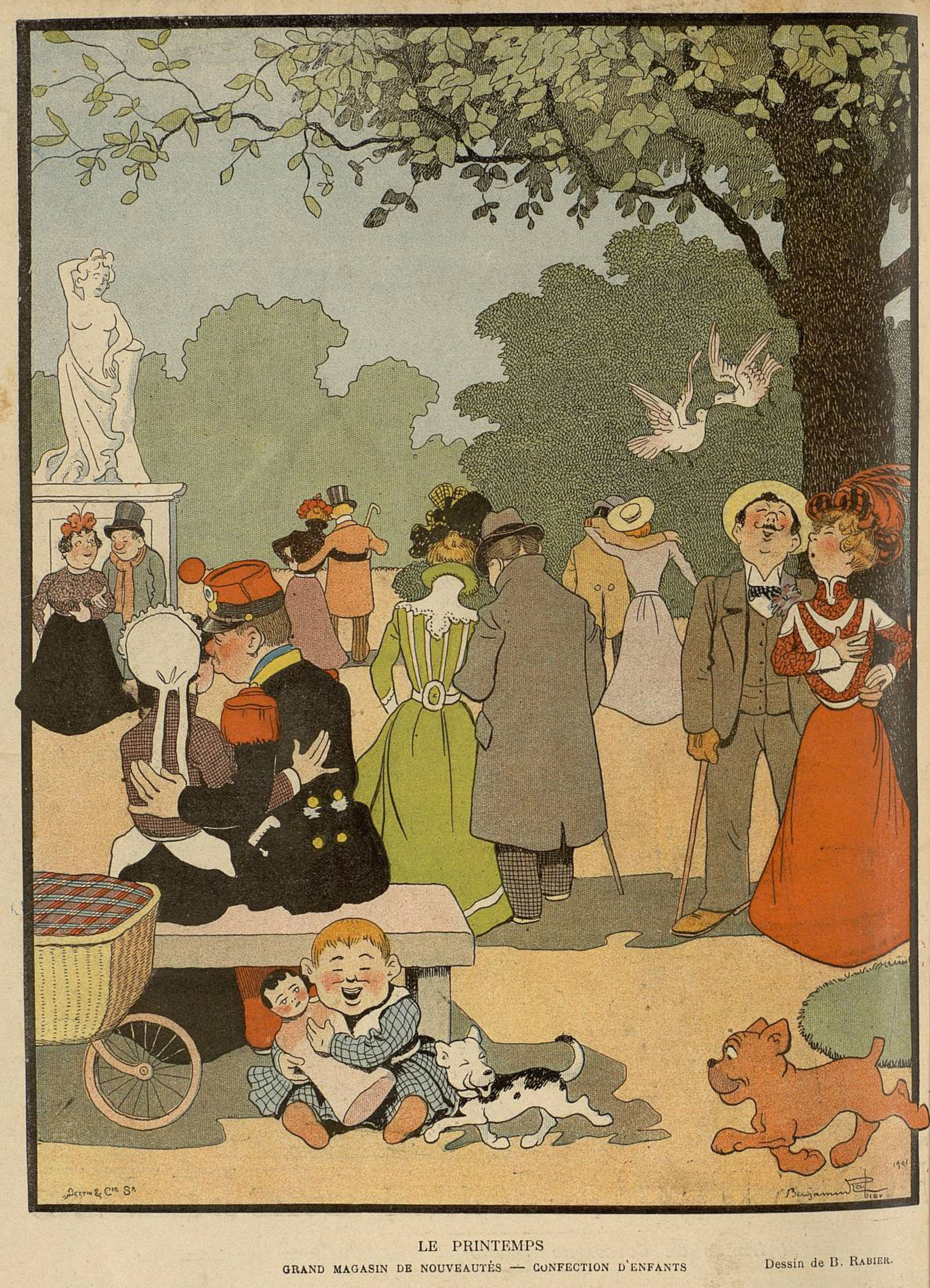
"Le printemps" published in Le Rire (May 1902)

Benjamin Rabier (1864–1939) was a French illustrator, comic book artist and animator. He became famous for creating the logo for Laughing Cow Cheese (La vache qui rit), and is one of the precursors of animal comics. His work has inspired many other artists, notably Hergé and Edmond-François Calvo.

A native of La Roche-sur-Yon, Vendée, Rabier started to work as an illustrator for various newspapers after meeting political cartoonist Caran d'Ache. His first album for children was the story of Tintin-Lutin, published in 1898, which told of a young lutin or "imp"; here his main characters are human and not animals, as they came to be in later albums. His most famous creations are Gideon the duck and the characters he drew for Le roman de Renart.

He died at Faverolles, Indre, in 1939.

== Bibliography ==
- Olivier Calon, Benjamin Rabier, Paris, Tallandier, 2004 ISBN 2-84734-102-1
