= Little Orbit the Astrodog and the Screechers from Outer Space =

Pluk, naufragé de l'espace
- Directed by: Jean Image
- Written by: France Image; Jean Image
- Release date: 14 March 1979
- Running time: 74 minutes
- Country: France
- Language: French

Little Orbit the Astrodog and the Screechers from Outer Space (French: Pluk, naufragé de l'espace) is a 1979 French animated science fiction film directed by Jean Image. It is based on the 1972 TV series Arago X-001.

The film is also known in English as Pluk in Cosmos and Pluk in the Space.

== Synopsis ==
Pluk, an extraterrestrial robot endowed with extraordinary strength, is stranded on Earth. He befriends the boy genius Niki, his girlfriend Babette and Niki's smart dog Jupiter. They all leave Earth in Niki's spacecraft l'Arago X-001, searching for Pluk's ship Le Cosmos. They stop on several planets before reaching Plukastre, the home planet of Pluk.
