= Joe the Little Boom Boom =

- Country of origin: France
- No. of episodes: 13

Production
- Running time: 5 minutes approx.

Original release
- Network: ORTF (France); IBA1 (Israel)
- Release: December 1960 – 1963

Joe the Little Boom Boom (French: Joë chez les Abeilles / Joë petit boum-boum) is an animated television series first produced between 1960 and 1963 and later remade into an animated feature film in 1973 (the English title for the film was Johnny in the Valley of the Giants). It was originally broadcast in 1960 by the ORTF.

In Wales, the series was dubbed and aired as part of the "Teli-Ho!" children's programming strand on TWW in Wales from the late 60s, as the first known animated series to dubbed in Welsh.

The show and the film were created by Jean Image, one of the leading French animators of his time.

== The original series (1960–1963) ==
Joe, a young boy, stops two youths trying to steal honey from a beehive. To thank him, the queen bee, Reine Fleur de Miel 145 (Queen Honey Flower 145), requests Bzz, her favorite adviser, to shrink Joe down to the size of an insect so he can visit her kingdom of the bees as a sign of gratitude. Accompanied by his new friend Bzz, Joe discovers a kingdom full of surprises and dangers.

== The film (1973) ==
Joe the Little Boom Boom
- Directed by: Jean Image
- Written by: Michel Emer; France Image
- Starring: Roger Carel; Laurence Badie; Christiane Legrand; Linette Lemercier
- Edited by: Per Olaf Csongova
- Music by: Michel Emer
- Production company: Films Jean Image
- Distributed by: Premiere Entertainment International
- Release date: 19 April 1973
- Running time: 60 minutes
- Country: France
- Language: French

In the 60-minute-long film, a group of boys encounter a spooky castle during a camping trip. The boys discover a very large man living there. The man traps the boys in a shrinking machine and reduces them to the size of flies. One boy, Joe, escapes and has an adventure in a beehive. When he gallantly saves the hive, the Queen Bee, Reine Fleur de Miel 145 (Queen Honey Flower 145) knights him. Eventually, they organize the bees and other woodland animals to attack the castle and rescue (and restore) his trapped friends.

== Alternative titles ==
- בזיק ויויו (Bzik VeYoyo) (Israeli Title)
- Joë chez les Abeilles / Joë petit boum-boum (French title)
- Joe e le api / Joe e le formiche (Italian title)

== See also ==
- List of animated feature films
