= Jean Comandon =

French microbiologist and filmmaker

Jean Comandon (3 August 1877 – 30 October 1970) was a French microbiologist and filmmaker. He was one of the leading figures in the development of microcinematography in Paris and its use in science research and education.

== Biography ==
Comandon studied microbiology in Paris from 1902 to 1906 and, afterwards, attended the University of Paris until 1909. Inspired by early films capturing Brownian motion, he learned how to use the ultramicroscope. For his doctoral thesis he used the ultramicroscope to study spirochaete obtained from syphilis patients at the Hôpital Saint-Louis. His mentor, Paul Gastou, connected him with Charles Pathé who allowed Comandon to perform his research at Pathé's film studio in Vincennes. The two of them developed a new camera system that allowed Comandon to better isolate syphilis spirochetes based on their characteristic movements. He published his thesis, along with his film Spirochaeta Pallida (Agent de la Syphilis), in October 1909.

Before and after serving as a physician for the French military during World War I, Comandon worked with Pathé to produce hundreds of educational scientific films on several topics such as microbiology, botany, and infant health. In the process he made several achievements in the practice of microcinematography, including the creation of the first x-ray film and, later, the first x-ray film of a human heart. However, most of the films he made during this time have been lost.

After Pathé discontinued development of scientific films, Comandon earned a position at the Pasteur Institute with Pierre de Fonbrune, with whom he would go on to found a microcinematography center in Garches.

== Legacy ==
Comandon's doctoral thesis attracted much attention from the scientific community in France and around the world. Although much of Comandon's work was done for commercial purposes, his developments to the practice of microcinematography proved useful in studying bacteria and diagnosing bacterial infections much earlier than previously possible. Still, his involvement with a major film producer allowed the technology to be distributed to more scientists, making its use in medical sciences possible. His work was one of the major catalysts for the popularization of cinematography in scientific research, allowing for temporal manipulation of scientific perception in addition to spatial.

The popularity of Comandon's films helped bring scientific film at large into the public eye. The ability to see microbes in motion and, later, the implementation of time-lapse cinematography proved a compelling novelty and made Comandon's films a source of entertainment as well as education. These films demonstrated that cinema depicting more abstract figures could appeal to mass audiences.

== Selected filmography ==
- Spirochaeta Pallida (Agent de la Syphilis) (1909)
- Microbes contenus dans l'intestin d'une souris (1910)
- Lavez-vous les mains avant chaque repas (1918)
- La Croissance des végétaux (1929)
