= Pierre Charbonnier =

French philosopher

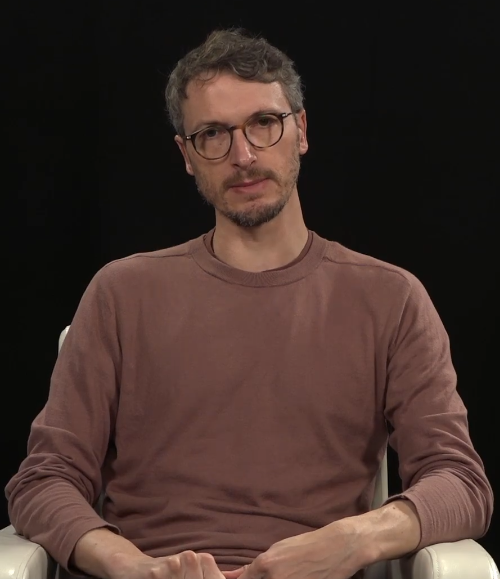
- In a 2024 interview
- Education: École Normale Supérieure
- Occupation: Philosopher

Pierre Charbonnier is a French philosopher. His main fields of work are political philosophy and environmental philosophy.

He studied at the École Normale Supérieure. He did his PhD in philosophy and works as a researcher at the Centre National de la Recherche Scientifique (CNRS) in Paris. He also coordinates a seminar about environmental theories at the Paris Nanterre University.

His work primarily deals with the development of political ideas and their dependence on the availability and use of environmental resources. His thinking is indebted to theorists such as Emile Durkheim, Claude Levi-Strauss and Philippe Descola. In particular his book "Abondance et Liberté" (2021, English: "Affluence and Freedom") has received widespread attention. Besides French and English, it has been published in Spanish, Portuguese and German.

== Publications ==
- La Fin d'un grand partage (CNRS, 2015).
- La Composition des mondes (Flammarion, 2014).
- Abondance et liberté (La Découverte, 2019; in English, Affluence and Freedom, Polity Press, 2021).
