= La Détente =

- A screenshot from the film
- Directed by: Pierre Ducos; Bertrand Bey
- Produced by: Kawanimation
- Edited by: Pierre Ducos; Bertrand Bey
- Music by: Patrick Stemelen
- Release date: October 2011
- Running time: 9 minutes
- Country: France
- Language: French

La Détente is a 2011 short French film directed by Pierre Ducos and Betrand Bey. It has won several prizes, including Best of show award at SIGGRAPH Asia 2011 and Best Animation award at the Sapporo International Short Film Festival. The film tells the story of a French soldier in World War I who becomes paralyzed with fear while in the trenches. He escapes in his head to an imaginary world where toys fight wars instead of humans. Eric Liu, chair of the Computer animation festival at SIGGRAPH Asia 2011, called La Détente a standout of the festival, saying "This animation short brings a unique and visually stunning computer-generated animation to the audience."

== Awards ==
- Jury Special Mention award - Larissa 2012, Greece
- Best Short Film award - Anirmau 2012, Spain
- Best International Short film award - Cortoons 2012, Rome
- Public award - Festival Cinecourtanimé 2012, Roanne France
- Best Short film award - Festival Ciné-Jeune 2012, St-Quentin France
- 3rd Prize International Short Film award - Animfest 2012, Athènes
- Best Animated film award - L'ombre d'un court 2012, Jouy en Josas
- Official selection Clermont-Ferrand 2012, France
- Best of Show award - SIGGRAPH ASIA 2011, Hong Kong
- Prix de la Jeunesse - Festival national du film d’animation, Bruz France
- Jury Special Award - IAF, Istanbul Turkey
- Best Environment Design - View awards 2011, Turin Italy
- Best Animation award - 6th Sapporo International Short Film Festival, Japan
- Jury Prize - OFF Court Festival 2011, Trouville France
- Jury Special Mention - Les Percéides Québec
- Best Short film - Festival du film francophone d’Angoulême, France
- Official selection Annecy 2011, France
