= Chaval (cartoonist) =

French caricaturist and cartoonist

- Born: Yvan Francis Le Louarn; 10 February 1914; Bordeaux, France
- Died: 22 January 1968; Paris, France
- Education: École des beaux-arts de Bordeaux
- Known for: cartoons, caricatures, drawing, film

Chaval, civil name Yvan Francis Le Louarn (* 10 February 1915 in Bordeaux; † 22 January 1968 by suicide in Paris), was a French caricaturist and cartoonist. German editions of his oeuvre were mostly published by Diogenes Verlag.

== Career ==
- Painters schools
  - School of Fine Arts, Bordeaux
  - Ecole des Beaux-Arts de Paris

== Oeuvre ==
=== Books ===
- Coproduced with Jean Bosc, Bob van den Born: Kleine Nachtmusik. Diogenes, Zürich 1954.
- Zum Heulen. Französischer Galgenhumor in 66 Zeichnungen. Diogenes, Zürich 1954.
- Diesseits von Gut und Böse. 99 Zeichnungen ohne jeden Kommentar. Diogenes, Zürich 1955.
- Mein Name ist Hase. 91 neue Zeichnungen. Diogenes, Zürich 1958.
- Autofahren kann jeder! Ein neuer Leitfaden für den modernen Kraftfahrer. Text Christian Strich. Diogenes, Zürich 1959.
- Chaval's Fotoschule. Ein unkonventioneller Leitfaden für Foto- und Filmamateure. Diogenes, Zürich 1960.
- Pechvogel und andere Zeichnungen ohne jeden Kommentar. Diogenes, Zürich 1963.
- Wissen Sie, dass Sie prächtig aussehen für Ihr Alter! Und 111 Cartoons ohne Worte. Ullstein, Berlin, Frankfurt am Main 1966.
- Zum Lachen und zum Heulen. Die 400 besten Zeichnungen. Diogenes, Zürich 1969.
- Hochbegabter Mann, befähigt, durch die blosse Erdumdrehung einen Eindruck von Geschwindigkeit zu empfinden. 54 Zeichnungen. Diogenes, Zürich 1970.
- Sie sollten weniger rauchen. Deutscher Taschenbuch Verlag, München 1972.
- Guten Morgen! 64 Cartoons. Diogenes, Zürich 1974.
- Gute Reise! 51 Cartoons. Diogenes, Zürich 1974.
- Gesundheit! 55 Cartoons. Diogenes, Zürich 1974.
- Gute Nacht! Diogenes, Zürich 1975.
- Lauter liebe Leute. Diogenes, Zürich 1974.
- Mensch bleibt Mensch. Deutscher Taschenbuch Verlag, München 1981.
- Eva, hinter dem erstbesten Mann her. Diogenes, Zürich 1986.
- Take it easy. Die besten Cartoons. Mit einem Nachwort von Daniel Keel. Diogenes, Zürich 2006, ISBN 3-257-02100-3.

=== Work in newspapers ===
His cartoons were also published in:

- Paris Match
- Le Figaro
- Le Rire
- Punch et
  - Le Bordelais

=== Book illustrations ===
He illustrated the following books:

- Swift
  - INSTRUCTIONS AUX DOMESTIQUES & Opuscules Humoristiques
- Erich Kästner
  - Die Schule der Diktatoren
- Raymond Queneau
  - Perrot, mon ami
- Denise Haraari
- Slawomir Mrozek
  - Das Leben für Fortgeschrittene,
  - Das Leben für Anfänger

=== Films ===
- Conte médiocre
- Les oiseaux sont des cons

== Awards ==
- Prix Carrizey
- Coupe Internationale du Meilleur Dessinateur

== Exhibitions ==
- Japan
- USA
- Paris
- Germany

== Personal ==
Chaval's political opinions are seen controversially in France.
