= Antoine Payen (animator) =

French animator

Antoine Payen (20 June 1902 - 1985) was a French animator whose most notable work was in advertising. He was born in Paris.
