= Patrick Ridremont =

Belgian comedian and actor (born 1967)

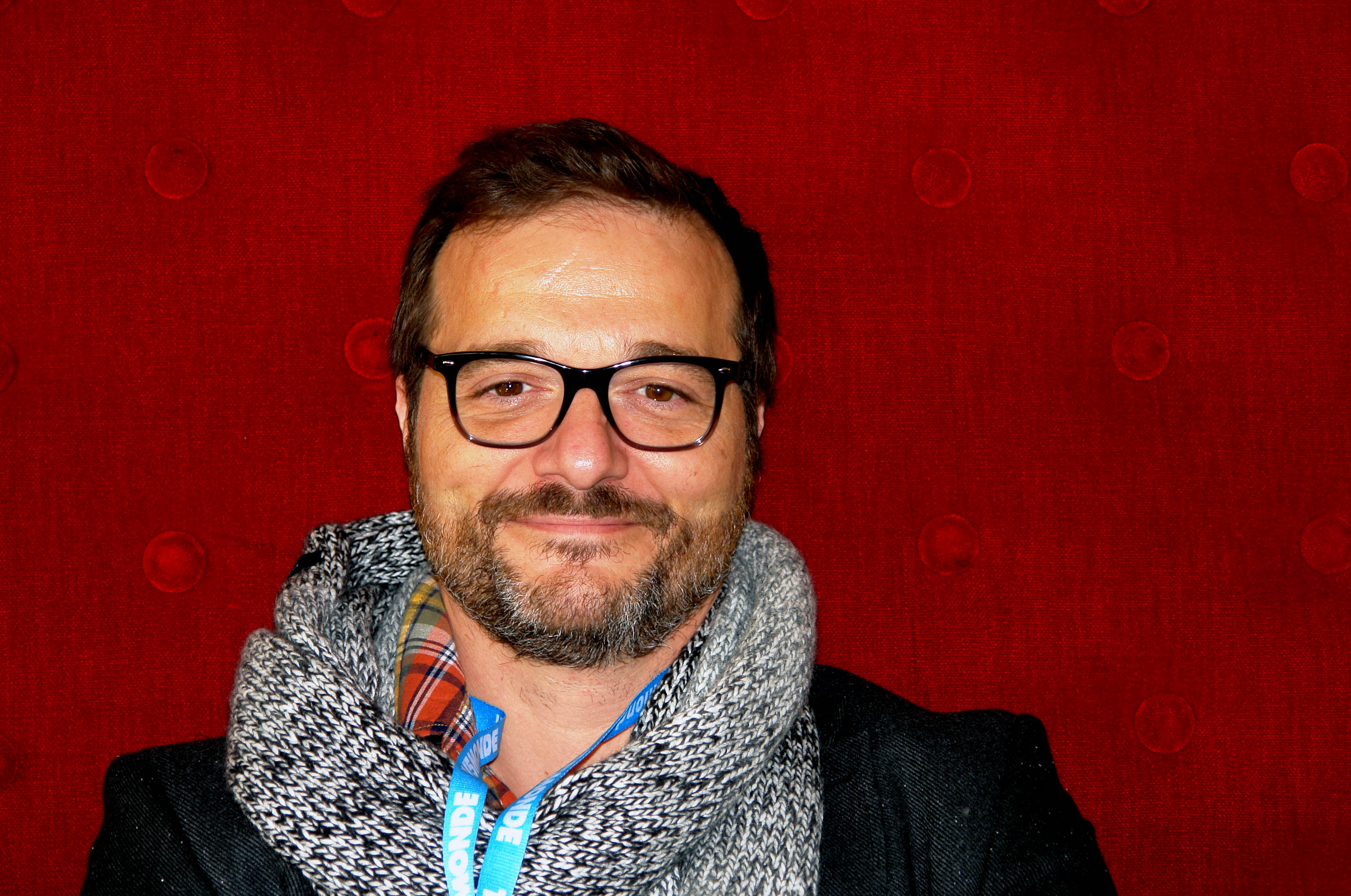
- Patrick Ridremont in 2012
- Born: 9 August 1967 (age 58); Léopoldville, Congo-Kinshasa
- Occupations: Comedian, actor
- Notable work: Dead Man Talking, Unit 42

Patrick Ridremont (born 9 August 1967) is a Belgian comedian and actor. He was born in Kinshasa (formerly Léopoldville) in the Democratic Republic of the Congo.

== Personal life ==
Ridremont has three daughters with Arielle Harcq. He was married to actress Virginie Efira from 2002 to 2005.

== Filmography ==
=== Actor ===
- 2001: Mauvais genres by François Girod
- 2005: Comme sur des roulettes by Jean-Paul Lilienfeld
- 2006: De si vieux amis (short film) by Michael Alalouf
- 2007: Mamie (short film) by Michaël Alalouf
- 2007: Deux sœurs (short film) by Emmanuel Jespers
- 2010: Zéro zéro belge by Pascal Rocteur
- 2010: A Cat in Paris by Alain Gagnol and Jean-Loup Felicioli (voice)
- 2010: La Chance de ma vie by Nicolas Cuche
- 2011: BXL/USA (TV movie) by Gaëtan Bevernaege
- 2012: Dead Man Talking
- 2014: Kontainer Kats
- 2015: En immersion (TV series) by Philippe Haïm
- 2015: Flic tout simplement by Yves Rénier
- 2015: Phantom Boy by Alain Gagnol and Jean-Loup Felicioli (voice)
- 2016: Radin! by Fred Cavayé
- 2016: Emma (TV series) by Alfred Lot
- 2017: La Forêt by Julius Berg
- 2017: Unit 42
- 2017: Parole contre parole by Didier Bivel
- 2018: Les Rivières pourpres (TV series)
- 2019: Rebelles by Allan Mauduit

=== Director ===
- 2012: Dead Man Talking
- 2017: La Station (short film)
- 2021: The Advent Calendar
