= Folimage =

French animation studio

- Industry: Animation
- Founded: 1981
- Founder: Jacques-Rémy Girerd
- Headquarters: Bourg-lès-Valence, Drôme, France
- Key people: Reginald de Guillebon (Director)
- Number of employees: 63 (2017)
- Website: www.folimage.fr

Folimage is a French animation studio, based in Bourg-lès-Valence, Drôme, France. It was founded in 1981 by Jacques-Rémy Girerd. The studio produces animation films for cinema and TV (short films, TV specials and series, feature films). In 1999, the company founded an animation school, La Poudrière, also in Valence. In 2009, Folimage and La Poudrière moved to La Cartoucherie, a former munitions factory in Bourg-lès-Valence.

== Filmography ==
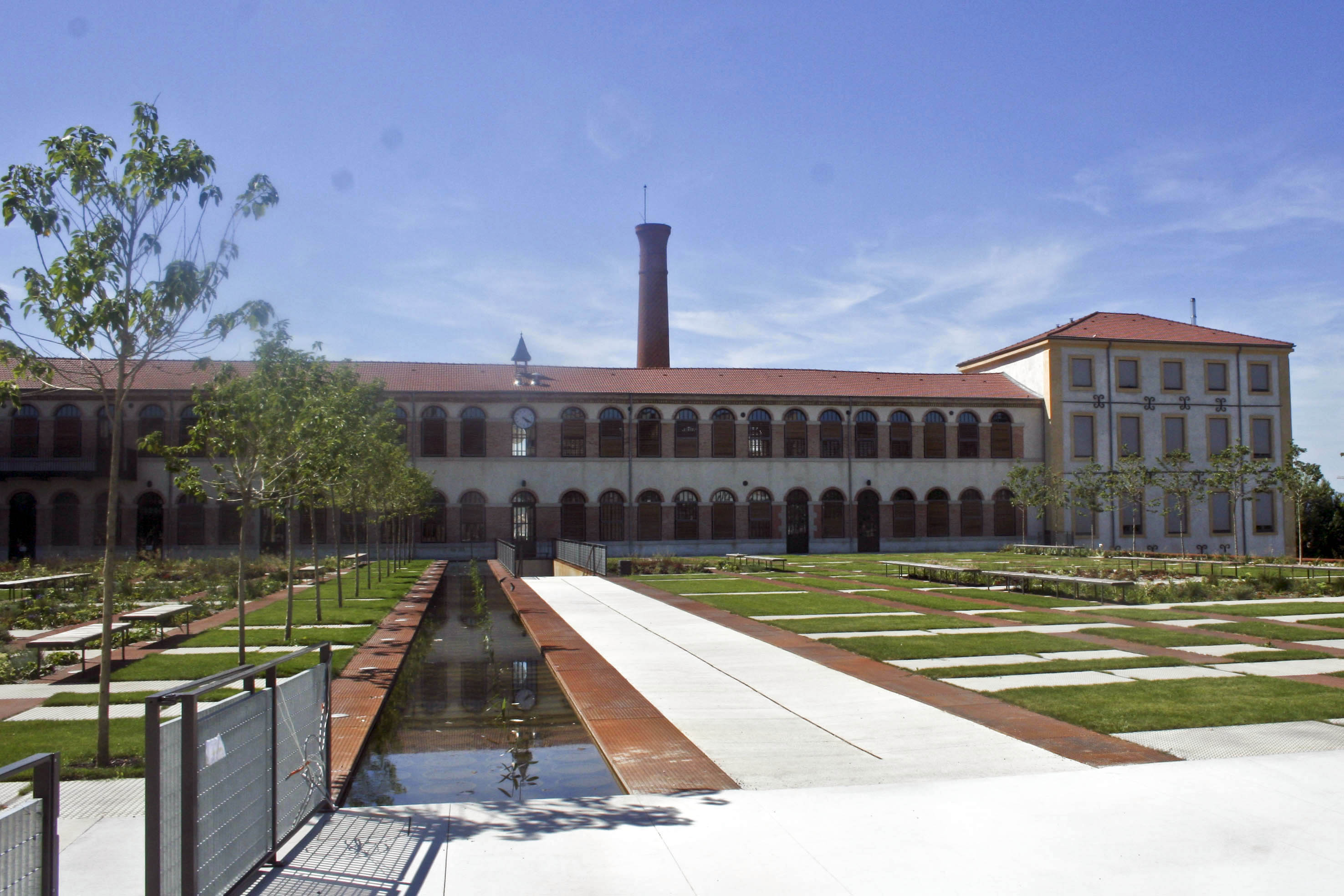
Folimage headquarters at La Cartoucherie, Bourg-lès-Valence

=== Short length ===
- L'Eléphant et la baleine (The Elephant and the Whale, 1986), directed by Jacques-Rémy Girerd
- Le Petit cirque de toutes les couleurs (The Little Circus and Other Tales, 1986), directed by Jacques-Rémy Girerd
- Sculpture, sculptures (1988), directed by Jean-Loup Felicioli
- Amerlock (1988), directed by Jacques-Rémy Girerd
- Nos adieux au music-hall (Farewell Musical, 1989), directed by Laurent Pouvaret
- Le Wall (The Wall, 1992), directed by Jean-Loup Felicioli
- Histoire extraordinaire de Mme Veuve Kecskemet (Extraordinary story of Madame Veuve Kecskemet, 1994), directed by Bela Weisz
- Une Bonne journée (A Pleasant Day, 1994), directed by Matthias Bruhn
- Le Moine et le poisson (The Monk and the Fish, 1994), directed by Michaël Dudok de Wit
- L'Abri (The Shelter, 1995), directed by Arnaud Pendrié
- Paroles en L'air (Winged Words, 1995), directed by Sylvain Vincendeau
- Le Grande Migration (The Great Migration, 1995), directed by Youri Tcherenkov
- Na kraju zemli (Au bout du monde in French, At the Ends of the Earth, 1999), directed by Konstantin Bronzit
- Histoire Tragique avec fin heureuse (Tragic Story with Happy Ending, 2005) directed by Regina Pessoa
- Les Conquérants (The Conquerors, 2011) directed by Tibor Bánóczki and Sarolta Szabó aka Domestic Infelicity

=== Medium length (TV Specials, 26') ===
- L'Enfant au grelot (Charlie's Christmas, 1998) directed by Jacques-Rémy Girerd
- Patate et le jardin potager (Spud and the vegetable garden, 2000) directed by Damien Louche-Pelissier and Benoit Chieux
- L'Hiver de Léon (Leon in Wintertime, 2008) directed by Pierre-Luc Granjon and Pascal Le Nôtre
- Le Printemps de Mélie (Molly in Springtime, 2009) directed by Pierre-Luc Granjon

=== TV series ===
- Ariol: 78 episodes, directed by Emilie Sengelin and Amandine Fredon. Broadcasting on TF1 (French channel) in 2009/2010
- Hilltop Hospital: 5 seasons of 10 episodes, directed by Pascal Le Nôtre
- My Little Planet: 2 seasons of 13 épisodes, directed by Jacques-Rémy Girerd
- Tidbits for Toddlers: 40 episodes, directed by Jacques-Rémy Girerd
- The Joy of Life: 20 episodes, directed by Jacques-Rémy Girerd
- My Donkey: 30 traditional French folksongs, directed by Pascal Le Nôtre
- Michel

=== Full-length Feature ===
- Raining Cats and Frogs (La Prophétie des grenouilles, 2003) directed by Jacques-Rémy Girerd
- Mia and the Migoo (Mia et le Migou, 2008) directed by Jacques-Rémy Girerd. The film won in 2009 the European Film Award for Best European animated feature film (European Film Academy)
- A Cat in Paris (Une vie de chat, 2010) directed by Alain Gagnol and Jean-Loup Felicioli. Release date in French theaters : 2010 December, 15th. International distribution : Films Distribution, Paris. The film received in 2012 a nomination for Academy Award for Best Animated Feature Film
- Aunt Hilda! (Tante Hilda!, 2014) directed by Jacques-Rémy Girerd
- Phantom Boy (2015) directed by Alain Gagnol and Jean-Loup Felicioli. Release date in French theaters : 2015 October, 14th
