= Constance Gay =

French actress (born 1992)

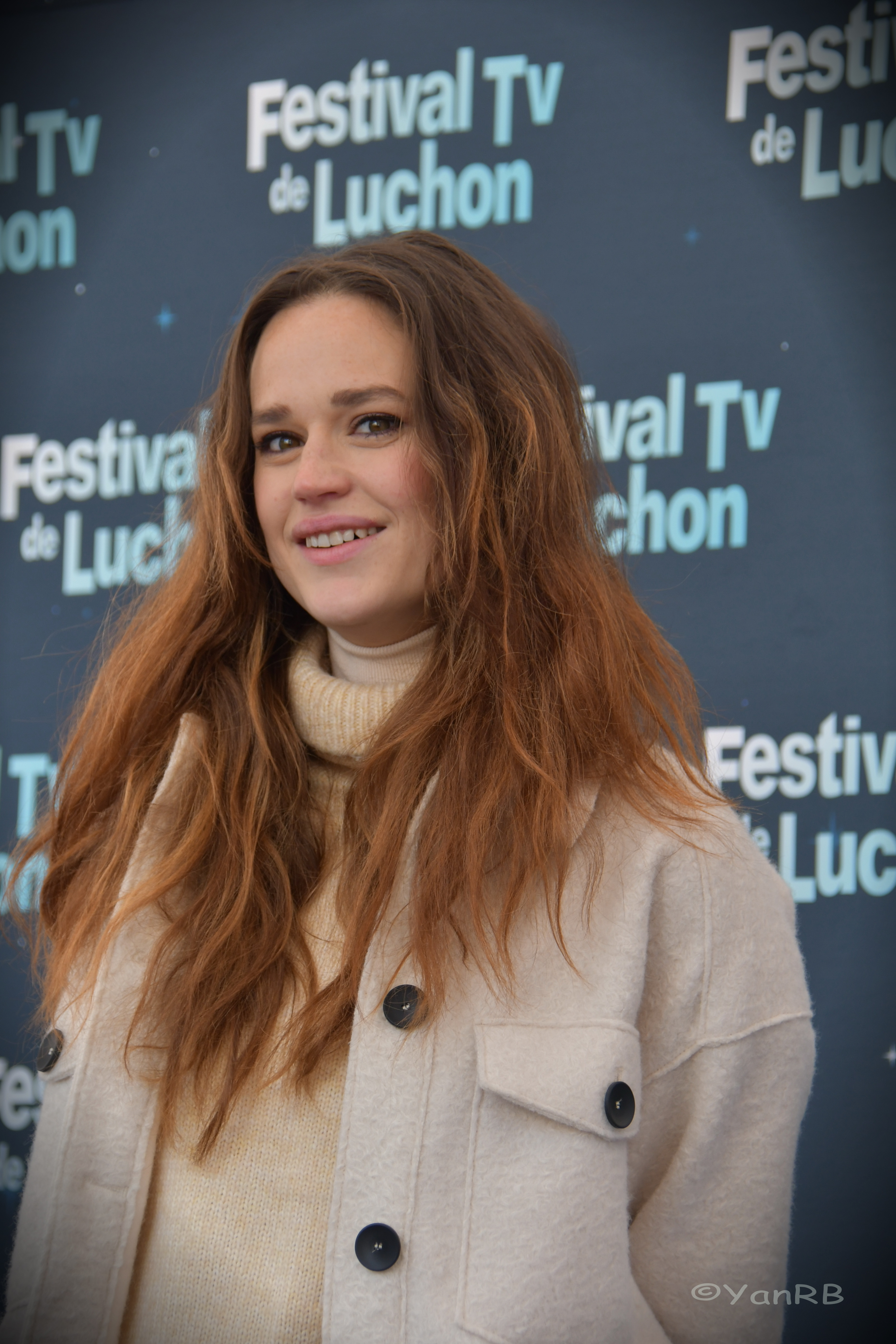
- Born: February 20, 1992 (age 34)
- Occupation: Actress
- Known for: Unit 42; Vous êtes jeunes vous êtes beaux

Constance Gay (born February 20, 1992) is a French actress best known for playing a lead role in the Unit 42 series. She also participated in the series Spiral.

== Personal life ==
Born in the Paris region on February 20, 1992, she studied at La Bruyère and Blanche de Castille high schools. She joined a business school to finally devote herself to journalism in print and radio.

== Career ==
Gay's first role on camera was during the first episode of the French police procedural, Spiral. Her first starring role was as Billie Veber, a young hacker who joins the cybercrime team on Unit 42, broadcast on RTBF and France 2.

She performs at the theater regularly.

She played a lead role in the Netflix series Eté 36 (2026).

== Filmography ==
Year	Title	Role	Director	Notes
2014	Spiral	Young Judge		TV series (1 episodes)
2017	Unit 42	Billie Vebber		TV series (20 episodes)
2018	Les Ombres de Lisieux	Laetitia Green	Nicolas Guicheteau	TV movie
2019	Chamboultout	Publishing house secretary	Eric Lavaine	
2019	La Belle Époque	Margot's replacement	Nicolas Bedos	
2019	Vous êtes jeunes vous êtes beaux	Gwen	Franchin Don	
2021	Face à face	Vanessa Tancelin		TV series (12 episodes)
2022	Vaincre ou mourir	Céleste Bulkeley	Paul Mignot; Vincent Mottez	
2026	Summer of 36	Léonie Morel	Frédéric Garson	TV series (6 episodes)

=== Short film ===
- Demi-Sang - Dublin Films - Réal : Laetitia Mikles & Pierre Primetens
- Qu'est ce qu'on attend? - Réal : A+W Bureau BADASS
- Loop
- Retcon (prix de la meilleure actrice du 48H Film Festival)
- Summer Wine in Time (2015)

== Theater ==
- 2014 La chair des sentiments
- 2014 Festin (Company Les Epis Noirs)
- 2016 Rien ne pouvait nous arriver Directed by Sébastien Pouderoux of the Comédie Française
- 2016 Le petit théâtre de Treplev Directed by Jean-Pierre Garnier
- 2018 J'avais un pays autrefois Directed by Jean-Christophe Blondel at the Théâtre de l'Etoile du Nord
