= Phantom Boy =

- Theatrical release poster
- Directed by: Jean-Loup Felicioli; Alain Gagnol
- Written by: Alain Gagnol
- Produced by: Jacques-Rémy Girerd
- Starring: Édouard Baer; Jean-Pierre Marielle; Audrey Tautou; Jackie Berroyer; Gaspard Gagnol; Noa Bernaoui-Savreux
- Edited by: Herve Guichard
- Music by: Serge Besset
- Production companies: Folimage; Lunanime; France 3 Cinema; Rhone-Alpes Cinema
- Distributed by: Diaphana Films
- Release dates: September 12, 2015 (TIFF); October 14, 2015 (France)
- Running time: 84 minutes
- Countries: France; Belgium
- Language: French
- Budget: €5.5 million
- Box office: $221,016

Phantom Boy is a 2015 animated fantasy film directed by Jean-Loup Felicioli and Alain Gagnol and written by Alain Gagnol. The film stars Édouard Baer, Jean-Pierre Marielle, Audrey Tautou, Jackie Berroyer, Gaspard Gagnol and Noa Bernaoui-Savreux. The film was released in France on October 14, 2015, by Diaphana Films.

== Plot ==
11-year-old Leo, dealing with cancer, reads a bedtime story to his younger sister Lily, before sharing a special secret with her: the illness has given Leo the ability to separate his spirit from his physical body, allowing him to hover and fly through the air in an intangible, invisible, and impalpable form, with his body remaining mostly asleep. He refers to this state as a "Phantom", but if he spends too much time away from his body, he will begin to fade away before disappearing entirely.

Meanwhile, NYPD Lieutenant Alex Tanner is demoted by his boss, Captain Simon, and assigned grunt work after he manages to catch two burglars robbing a supermarket, but blows up part of the building in the process. Leo is taken to the hospital for more tests, as his illness worsens. He laments over the loss of his hair and follows his mother home as a phantom. She weeps over Leo's health but does not let Lily see her cry.

That night, a strange man with a greatly disfigured face makes a phone call to the Mayor. He proceeds to cause a blackout that affects all of New York City: he informs the Mayor the blackout was done by a powerful computer virus he has put into the internet, that will destroy the entire city's infrastructure in the next 24 hours unless he receives a payment of one billion dollars. While the man refers to himself as the King of New York, newspaper outlets begin calling him "The Face". Tanner attempts to apprehend The Face at the docks but is outsmarted and left for dead under a broken crate.

Tanner is taken to a hospital, where his phantom encounters Leo's. Leo guides Tanner's phantom back into his body, as Leo has done for countless other patients, just as Tanner's phantom starts to fade. When Tanner awakens, Leo is amazed to find that Tanner remembers his phantom, as all other patients forget. Tanner meets with Miss Mary Delaney, a reporter with an anonymous lead as to the location of The Face. Leo convinces Tanner to let his phantom tag along since Tanner's leg is still broken.

Mary is ambushed by The Face but manages to escape with the help of Leo's phantom and Tanner (via telephone). Then the two blackmail The Mole, an ex-con on parole, to help Mary look for information pertaining to The Face's whereabouts as Leo's phantom follows. When his phantom returns to the hospital, Leo sees his parents crying and Lily reading to an imaginary version of Leo so she does not get lonely.

The Face captures Mary after The Mole fails to rescue her and is knocked unconscious. The Big Guy and The Little Guy, The Face's henchmen, arrive at the hospital with orders to kill Tanner. Tanner manages to gain the upper hand but The Big Guy runs off with Leo's body. Leo's phantom is able to return just as hospital security arrests the two hitmen. Leo's phantom follows The Face's dog back to the docks. It leads Leo to a ship called Vizir where Mary is held captive.

Nearing midnight, The Face leaves Mary onboard the ship and detonates a bomb. She frantically attempts to stop the virus by guessing the password that will shut it down, eventually succeeding when she realizes from The Face's words that the password is "Eyelids". Tanner and Leo's fading phantom help her escape the sinking ship but The Face returns, enraged over his plan destroyed. During the confrontation, The Face lashes out at his dog, resulting in the dog attacking him. Mary makes it off the ship as it finally sinks.

Leo's phantom races back to the hospital but disappears just outside the building. Spiritless, Leo's body falls into a coma. Tanner, guilty about Leo endangering his life to save Mary, tells her about Leo's abilities. Lily reads one of her bedtime stories to Leo's body, and his spirit is able to return. He tearfully reunites with his family.

Some time later, Tanner's leg has healed and he begins a relationship with Mary. He receives a call from Captain Simon informing him that the Mayor wants to congratulate him with a ceremony and a promotion, much to the Captain's dismay. Back at home, Leo finishes reading Lily a bedtime story and gazes out at the New York City skyline.

== Voice cast ==
Character	French voice actor	English dubbing actor
Lt. Alex Tanner (Alex Tanguy)	Édouard Baer	Jared Padalecki
The Face (L'homme au visage cassé)	Jean-Pierre Marielle	Vincent D'Onofrio
Mary Delaney (Mary Delauney)	Audrey Tatou	Melissa Disney
The Mole (La Taupe)	Jackie Berroyer	Dana Snyder
Leo (Léo)	Gaspard Gagnol	Marcus D'Angelo
Lily (Titi)	Noa Bernaoui-Savreux	Rachel Salvatierra
The Little Guy (Le petit nerveux)	Patrick Ridremont	Fred Armisen
The Big Guy (Le géant)	Patrick Descamps	Joey Camen
Captain Simon (Le commissaire)	Yves Barbaut	Bill Lobley

== Production ==
=== Screenplay ===
Phantom Boy is the second film co-directed by Alain Gagnol and Jean-Loup Felicioli, who had already worked together on A Cat in Paris, an animated film inspired by film noir set in Paris. For Phantom Boy, the two directors chose to mix the detective genre with the fantastic, two genres not often associated in animated films, and to create a detective film for children. They also drew some of their inspiration from American superhero stories. The character of Leo, aka Phantom Boy, is inspired by comic book superheroes created by writer Stan Lee for the publisher Marvel Comics in the 1960s (Stan Lee is best known for inventing Spider-Man, the web-slinger, and Hulk, who transforms into a green-skinned colossus with superhuman strength); the directors particularly appreciate his work because he chose to invent fallible superheroes, making them relatable to real-world people. Leo's nickname, Phantom Boy, is intended as an allusion to the names often used for American superheroes. Alain Gagnol and Jean-Loup Felicioli intertwine in the screenplay typical elements of detective films (characters wearing hats and trench coats, investigations, a journalist assisting the police occasionally) with others borrowed from superhero adventures (Leo's extraordinary power, the "supervillains" recognizable by their distinctive and picturesque traits), with the two genres converging in a common urban imaginary.

The film's title uses the English word phantom, chosen because it evokes less the idea of a ghost than the word ghost, as its sounds are closer to French and the film's creators find them more poetic. In its early stages, the project also had a French title, Insaisissable.

=== Animation ===
The visual universe of Phantom Boy is similar to that of A Cat in Paris. Again, the directors opted for a cartoon whose animation is done by hand on paper, with computer work taking place only at a later stage. Likewise, the adopted graphic style aims to showcase the "touch" of the artists. In the directors' statement included in the film's press kit, they indicated that this choice ''serves to remind that films are not mere consumer products but the result of the meticulous work of a group of artists and technicians''.

The New York of Phantom Boy is designed from photos of modern-day New York, but by relocating certain buildings or changing their angles to invent a slightly different New York. The sets are drawn in wax chalk on paper before being refined on a computer, without erasing the traces of pencil and chalk strokes.

The OpenToonz software, also used by Studio Ghibli, is one of the tools used to create this animated feature film.

=== Music ===
The film's music is composed by Serge Besset, who had previously composed the soundtrack for A Cat in Paris. The soundtrack of Phantom Boy is primarily composed of symphonic music intended to give breath to the adventure. Children's choirs further enhance the strangeness of the fantastic sequences where Leo uses his power.

== Box Office ==
Phantom Boy was released in theaters in France on October 14, 2015; it was shown in 173 theaters. During its opening week, the film gathered just over 33,600 admissions, including 8,450 in Paris. Towards the end of its theater run, Phantom Boy accumulated just over 151,450 admissions in France, and broke even at 24%.

== Release ==
The film premiered at the 2015 Toronto International Film Festival on September 12, 2015. The film was released in France on October 14, 2015, by Diaphana Films.

== Reception ==
On review aggregation site Rotten Tomatoes, the film holds and approval rating of 88% based on 52 reviews, with an average rating of 7/10. The website's critics consensus reads, "Stunning animation and old-fashioned charm more than make up for a relative lack of narrative depth." Metacritic, which uses a weighted average, assigned the film a score of 66 out of 100 based on 18 critics, indicating "generally favorable reviews".
