= Bastards y Diablos =

2015 film

- Spanish: Bastards y Diablos
- Directed by: A.D. Freese
- Written by: Andrew Perez
- Produced by: A.D. Freese; Dillon Porter
- Starring: Andrew Perez; Dillon Porter; JB Blanc; Sebastian Eslava; Brunhilde Otto; Juana Arias; Constanza Marek Otto; Rubén Arciniegas; Vicky Zorrilla Vaughn; Gabriel Antonio Mejia Montoya; Brian Porter
- Cinematography: Peter Grigsby
- Edited by: A.D. Freese
- Music by: Louis Febre
- Release dates: 14 June 2015 (Los Angeles Film Festival); 19 October 2018 (Colombia); 7 September 2020 (France); 9 November 2020 (United States)
- Country: Colombia
- Languages: Spanish, English

Bastards y Diablos (lit. Bastards and Devils) is a 2015 Colombian-American co-production drama film directed by A.D. Freese and written by Andrew Perez, which is based on Perez's own experiences growing up between two cultures and his relationship with his half-brother from his Colombian father. The bilingual film follows two estranged half-brothers, Ed (portrayed by screenwriter Andrew Perez) and Dion (played by co-producer Dillon Porter) who reunite when their father, Gabriel (JB Blanc) passes away, leaving behind a will for his sons to scatter his ashes across the Caribbean scenery that he had a deep connection to in his motherland, Colombia.

== Plot ==
The film opens with the delicate voiceover of Gabriel Rojas (Blanc), figuratively speaking to his sons from death where his boys were mothered by separate American women. Ed and Dion are introduced as children through nostalgic, grainy home movies, until we meet them in the present as young men, speaking to each other for the first time since childhood, facing the busy road behind an industrial airport. As Dion, the oldest of the two, exhibiting a worldly demeanor yet deep insecurities, smokes a cigarette and engages in distant, awkward small talk (effortlessly switching between Spanish and English) with the younger Eduardo, or Ed, a childish "frat boy," it becomes apparent that a single event has obligated the brothers to meet again: their father is dead (the cause: cirrhosis) and a will he has left behind with his family in Colombia pleads for his sons to return home for his funeral.

The men uncomfortably joke around with one another as they arrive at their relatives' house, attempting to bury their true feelings: they do not really want to be here and each harbor misgivings, notably Dion, of the lack of parental affection their father had given them. Despite this, Ed and Dion vow to honor their father's last wishes, staying together in an attic room and reuniting (or in other cases, being introduced to for the first time) their many cousins, including a troubled young man, Jairo (Arciniegas) who has bipolar disorder (though refuses to take medication) and a young woman who Ed expresses sexual attraction to (indicating that he didn't know her well as a boy).

Sometime during the memorial service, the brothers gain legal access to the will in writing as well as snapshots and detailed notes, learning that their dad, Gabriel has something larger in store for them: he wants his sons to partake in a country road trip from one location to the next, visiting old friends, relatives and places in order to learn about their essentially absent father and the life he lived (an opportunity he had lost when he was alive). All the while, Gabriel desires for his ashes to be scattered throughout the country in such places that held emotional meaning to him. The men respect Gabriel's request and embark on their odyssey, riding by bus and hopping from city to city (Bogotá, Medellín, Cali, Cartagena and Santa Marta), following the trail of breadcrumbs in their father's photographs. All the while, the brothers' scenic journey is interjected with flashbacks of a young Gabriel (Eslava) acting foolishly in his excessive drinking and pursuits of women. The brothers are often equally as careless with their hard partying and sexuality, finding themselves in all sorts of conflicts in their attraction (and immature behavior) to the local women. Eventually, the brothers receive a vivid picture of their father through conversations with relatives, such as Aunt Ana (Zorrilla Vaughand). Despite the competition between them as they are starved of their father's presence, they grow closer to one another, coming to realize that they have more in common than initially believed apart from their polar opposite personalities. They do discover, tragically, that their father was responsible for his downfall as a deadbeat parent.

Young Gabriel fell in love with Dion's mother (or so he believed), fathering her son. That was, until he had eyes on Ed's mother, deciding to abandon his "first love" and their son, and begin a new relationship with his "ultimate love." However, Young Gabriel's self-absorbed personality kept him from being fully committed to any relationship. He never married and, in fact, had a "true lover," Bruni (Arias as her younger version; Brunhilde Otto as her older version) - a woman whom the brothers decide to provide the update of Gabriel's death (albeit, with darkly humorous incompetence). Thus, Gabriel left his sons with their respective mothers and "half of a father" up until his death. The boys were robbed of a father and of brotherhood; Ed largely grew up in his native Colombia (though identifies as American because of the influence of his mother's family) while Dion relocated and was mainly raised in the United States (therefore, the siblings almost never saw each other).

More revealing is that Ed and Dion turned out, more or less, like their irresponsible father. Whether the men decide to change themselves for the better or meet the same ill-fate as their lonely father is up for them to decide. The brothers ultimately depart on a sombre note, confessing their brotherly love for one another.

== Cast ==
- Andrew Perez as Eduardo "Ed" Rojas
- Dillon Porter as Dion Rojas
- JB Blanc as Gabriel Rojas
- Sebastian "Sebas" Eslava as Young Gabriel Rojas
- Brunhilde Otto as Bruni
- Juana Arias (credited as Juanita Arias) as Young Bruni
- Constanza Marek Otto as Constanza
- Rubén Arciniegas as Jairo Rojas
- Vicky Zorrilla Vaughn as Aunt Ana
- Gabriel Antonio Mejia Montoya as Padre Gabriel
- Brian Porter as Joseph
- Sylvana Acosta Perez as Young Cousin

== Production ==
Andrew Perez, who wrote the screenplay and cast himself as one of the leads, Eduardo "Ed" Rojas, revealed that the film is semi-autobiographical, based on the events surrounding his father's death and the relationship he formed with his half-brother. Though American and raised in Los Angeles, his family originally hails from Colombia.

While a chiefly American production, produced by RadioactiveGiant, the film was shot all across Colombia through the joint efforts of Pico y Placa, except for one scene which takes place at a coffee plantation; Montenegro, Querétaro, Mexico stood in for the fictional setting. The principal photography followed a tight schedule and operated under little sleep for the crew, being shot in just thirty-five days in over a dozen Colombian cities and five principal locations with a crew of six people.

In an interview with SHOUTOUT LA, actor and screenwriter Andrew Perez commented that he and his small team "hopped on a plane to Bogotá with a first draft" and no production funding, commenting that "everything would be funded on credit cards." Most of the characters had not been cast at this stage, "yet we were burning to leap and take advantage of the lightning in a bottle we had." In a little over a month, he and his crew had a rough version of a feature-length film.

Actor and producer, Dillon Porter was determined to make a bilingual production, saying: "It's really rare to see that [from a film that isn't Bollywood]." He realized that the language barrier for the intended audience, leading up to the premiere in Colombia, would present challenges, although, "this character is speaking English but in a thick accent," he explained. "He's speaking Spanish, but so slow, so gringo that even [someone who doesn't speak Spanish] can understand." While he and actor-screenwriter Perez were eager to depict the beauty of the Colombian landscape, Porter noted that the unpredictable weather was often an issue when filming exterior shots. Thus, he and Perez found solutions by working it into the story somehow.

Perez and Porter pooled whatever resources were easily available to them. Family members played a huge role in standing in for the brothers' numerous relatives and friends (plus, local actors with no acting experience) and preparing locations for the shoot. Some characters portrayed themselves, such as Brunhilde Otto (cast as the grown-up version of Gabriel's lover, Bruni). In real life, she actually was Perez's late father's girlfriend and Perez, indeed, delivered the tragic news of his father's passing to her personally. For the scene in question, she re-enacted the emotional moment.

Director A.D. Freese and Perez (friends from Casa Grande High School) turned to the work of independent filmmaker John Cassavetes as a "mood board" for the documentary-style filming techniques.

== Release ==
In June 2015, the film was submitted for competition to the Los Angeles Film Festival (LAFF). Sheri Linden of The Hollywood Reporter had received the film positively, however, it only had a limited theatrical release in Colombia, having its national premiere in Bogotá in October 2018. It wasn't released elsewhere (on streaming or physically) until late in 2020.

== Reception ==
=== Critical response ===
Bastards y Diablos received generally positive reception at its world premiere festival run. Sheri Linden for The Hollywood Reporter, in an unrated review, expressed that director, A.D. Freese "captures the journey with a documentary immediacy" and called screenwriter Andrew Perez's screenplay "sharp." She praised Peter Grigsby's "evocative" cinematography and Louis Febre's "romantic" soundtrack, though criticized the bloated use of voiceover, saying: "The somewhat heavy-handed poeticism of Gabriel's voiceover commentary, delivered in the rich baritone of J.B. Blanc, takes some getting used to." Despite this, she positively singled out the film's careful balance of comedic and dramatic tones, which were "deftly shot and played" by Perez and Porter. Of Porter's performance, he "embodies the recklessness and the resilience of Dion" while "Perez captures another type of emotional edge, less electrifying than Dion's experience but potentially as life-changing." She highlighted Rubén Arciniegas as the "extraordinary" Jairo, Ed's cousin who would rather experience the beauty and horrors of his bipolar disorder without the influence of drugs because essentially, life "is terrible," yet beautiful all the same.

Felipe Rocha of The Bogotá Post shared mixed sentiments, rating the film two stars out of five. In his review, Rocha said the cinematography by Peter Grigsy "beautifully captures the colourful and vibrant landscape of the Caribbean region." He added that Grigsby had "impressive shots of the salt cathedral of Zipaquirá" as well. On the negative side, he declared that the story had very little to offer. Of young Gabriel's character, he stated, unamusingly: "[He is] a spoiled brat who spends his days drinking and mistreating women. Bad news is that his two sons turned out exactly like him." He stressed that all the women characters were written as "props in a selfish journey," and "the foulest thing about Bastards y Diablos, is the treatment of the women." He commented further, believing the most interesting character was Jairo, the mentally ill cousin, concluding that the film "is basically a frat boy road trip disguised as a profound drama," pointing out: "[N]o matter how much piano music or violin strings the director decides to use, the movie is still distasteful."

Brian Gibson writing for Film Threat gave a positive review. He said when the brothers travel across their father's homeland carrying his ashes: "What follows evolves into a buddy road movie that shows the heart of a nation, the beauty of a culture you may not know, and the story of two strangers becoming brothers and friends." He added that due to the filmmakers' insistence on casting family members and un-trained locals to flesh out the setting, the actors gave "raw, naturalistic performances that are very compelling."

Bob Strauss of Los Angeles Daily News critiqued positively: "[The film] bears the ring of spontaneous, specific experience, much like another notable Los Angeles Film Festival entry, French Dirty, does. Particularly engaging is a geopolitical rant by an emotionally unbalanced Bogotá cousin, but there are many moments almost as good." However, his main criticism was that Blanc's voiceover of the father's spirit "can get too poetic sentimentalist."

Rolling Stone Colombia offered a mixed review. Critic André Didyme held the opinion that the film was basically a college movie "full of the typical flaws" of amateur filmmaking. However, he commended the film's "passion and ingenuity."

=== Awards and nominations ===
Award	Date of ceremony	Category	Recipient(s)	Result	Ref(s)
Los Angeles Film Festival	14 June 2015	US Fiction Award	A.D. Freese	Nominated	
Ashland Independent Film Festival	11 April 2016	Best Feature	A.D. Freese	Won	
Ashland Independent Film Festival	11 April 2016	Audience Award for Best Narrative Feature	A.D. Freese	Won	
Durango Independent Film Festival	5 March 2017	Audience Award & Jury Commendation for Best Narrative Feature	A.D. Freese, Andrew Perez	Won	

== See also ==
- Entre nos (2009 semi-autobiographical Colombian film)
- Prayers for the Stolen (2021 Mexican film on Netflix)
- The Other Son (2023 Colombian film shot in Bogotá)
