= Unit 42 =

Belgian television series

- French: Unité 42
- Genre: Crime drama
- Created by: Julie Bertrand; Annie Carels; Charlotte Joulia
- Screenplay by: Charlotte Joulia, Julie Bertrand, Sammy Fransquet, Annie Carels, Anne-Charlotte Kassab
- Directed by: Mathieu Mortelmans, Indra Siera, Hendrik Moonen
- Starring: Patrick Ridremont; Constance Gay
- Composers: Michel Duprez and Thierry Plas
- Country of origin: Belgium
- Original language: French
- No. of seasons: 2
- No. of episodes: 20

Production
- Running time: 52 minutes
- Production companies: Left Field Ventures; RTBF

Original release
- Network: La Une
- Release: November 19, 2017 – December 17, 2019

Unit 42 (original title: Unité 42) is a Belgian television series written by Julie Bertrand, Annie Carels and Charlotte Joulia. It premiered in Belgium on La Une on 19 November 2017, and it was released worldwide on Netflix on 14 June 2019.

After The Break and Public Enemy, Unit 42 came out of the second joint call for projects between RTBF and the Wallonia-Brussels Federation.

== Synopsis ==
A Federal Police unit fights against new forms of cybercrime.

== Cast ==
=== Main cast ===
- Patrick Ridremont as Sam Leroy
- Constance Gay as Billie Vebber
- Tom Audenaert as Bob Franck
- Roda Fawaz as Nassim Khaoulani
- Danitza Athanassiadis as Alice Meerks
- Thomas Demarez as Tom Leroy
- Simon Caudry as Robin Leroy
- Caroline Stas as Camille Leroy
- Nola Tilman as Emmy Leroy
- Hélène Theunissen as Hélène Janssen

=== Series 1 ===
- Tania Garbarski as Manuela Desmet
- Anne-Pascale Clairembourg as Sandra Magnot
- Selma Alaoui as Dianne Wauters
- Éric De Staercke as Léon Neefs
- Alain Eloy as Henri Ravet
- Jean-Michel Balthazar as Lambert Hammers
- Bastiste Sornin as Michel Van Deck
- Olivier Bonjour as Dominic Dalmot
- Christophe Lambert as Le Ravisseur
- Adonis Danieletto as Marc Descamps

=== Series 2 ===
- Mirza Kilic as Jocelyn

== Production information ==
- Original title: Unité 42
- Director: Indra Siera (4 episodes), Mathieu Mortelmans (4 episodes), Roel Mondelaers (3 episodes), Hendrik Moonen (7 episodes)
- Screenplay: Charlotte Joulia, Julie Bertrand, Annie Carels, Sammy Fransquet and Anne-Charlotte Kassab
- Costumes: Vanessa Evrard
- Photography: Sander Vandenbroucke
- Editing: Marc de Coster, Philippe Ravoet and Steven Sanders
- Makeup: Elodie Lienard, Juan-Carlos Salazar, Valérie Tomasi
- Special Effects Makeup: Lionel Lê
- Music: Michel Duprez and Thierry Plas
- Producers: John Engel (producer/executive producer); Marie Queffeulou (associate producer); Christelle Mahy (line producer)
- Production companies: Left Field Ventures, Steel Fish Pictures, RTBF
- Country of origin: Belgium
- Original language: French
- Genre: Crime drama, thriller
- Duration: 52 minutes
- Release dates:
  - Season 1:
  - Belgium: 19 November 2017 on La Une, 7 October 2019 on VRT
  - France: 15 January 2018 on France 2
  - Switzerland: 12 April 2018 on RTS Un
  - Germany and Austria: November 2018 - January 2019 on Sony Channel (German TV channel) (dubbed in German)
  - Season 2:
  - Belgium: 3 November 2019 on La Une and Auvio3

== Series overview ==
Season	Episodes	Originally released	
Season	Episodes	First released	Last released
1	10	November 19, 2017	December 17, 2017
2	10	November 3, 2019	December 17, 2019

== Episodes ==
=== Season 1 (2017) ===
No.	Title	Directed by	Written by	Original release date
1	"Face to Face" (French: Face à Face)	Indra Siera	Julie Bertrand	November 19, 2017
Several women are found dead, naked, in front of their computer screen. Their internet installation completely disconnected suggests a hacking. Sam and Billie will have all the trouble in the world to stop the serial killer who uses his computer skills to put them on false leads. Can they stop him before he makes a new victim?
2	"Of Faith and Law" (French: Foi et Loi)	Indra Siera	Annie Carels	November 19, 2017
The assassination of a cyber-preacher who has just returned from Syria is causing trouble and revealing rivalries between recruiters. Sam and Billie will have to find the truth at the heart of human conflict, but also at the heart of the infernal machine that is propaganda 2.0. An infernal machine that sometimes pushes the best of us to the irreparable.
3	"Avatar" (French: Avatar)	Indra Siera	Annie Carels	November 26, 2017
4	"Blood and Virtue" (French: Sang et Vertu)	Roel Mondelaers	Annie Carels	November 26, 2017
5	"Live Memory" (French: Mémoire Vive)	Roel Mondelaers	Annie Carels	December 3, 2017
6	"Helpful Votes" (French: Vote Ultime)	Roel Mondelaers	Annie Carels	December 3, 2017
7	"Connected" (French: Connectée)	Hendrik Moonen	Annie Carels	December 10, 2017
8	"An Eye for an Eye" (French: Oeil pour Oeil)	Hendrik Moonen	Annie Carels	December 10, 2017
9	"Standby Mode" (French: Standby Mode)	Hendrik Moonen	Annie Carels	December 17, 2017
10	"Reboot" (French: Reboot)	Indra Siera	Annie Carels	December 17, 2017

=== Season 2 (2019) ===
Season 2 was produced in 2019 and aired on RTBF La Une on 3 November 2019 after its first exclusive run on Belgian payTV platform Proximus.

No.	Title	Directed by	Written by	Original release date
1	"Blog Mom - Part 1" (French: Blogomum - part 1)	Mathieu Mortelmans	Charlotte Joulia	November 3, 2019
2	"Blog Mom - Part 2" (French: Blogomum - part 2)	Mathieu Mortelmans	Charlotte Joulia	November 3, 2019
3	"Game Tort" (French: Délit de jeu)	Christophe Wagner	Xavier Vairé, Sammy Fransquet	November 26, 2019
4	"Hot Spot" (French: Hot Spot)	Christophe Wagner	Nacim Mehtar, Vincent Guillemot, Daphnis O. Boelens	November 26, 2019
5	"Fire Wall" (French: Pare-feu)	Hendrik Moonen	Vincent Robert, Daphnis o. Boelens	December 3, 2019
6	"Cyber Love" (French: Cyber Love)	Hendrik Moonen	Julie Bertrand	December 3, 2019
7	"Skin Deep" (French: Sous la peau)	Hendrik Moonen	Charlotte Joulia, Daphnis O. Boelens	December 10, 2019
8	"The Afterlife" (French: La vie d'après)	Hendrik Moonen	Sammy Fransquet, Xavier Vairé	December 10, 2019
9	"False Pretenses" (French: Faux-semblants)	Mathieu Mortelmans	Julie Bertrand	December 17, 2019
10	"Chaos" (French: Chaos)	Mathieu Mortelmans	Vincent Robert, Nacim Mehtar, Charlotte Joulia	December 17, 2019
