= L/R: Licensed by Royalty =

Japanese anime television series

- DVD cover of L/R: Licensed by Royalty in North America, Volume 1

エルアール ライセンスド バイ ロイアル (Eruaru Raisensudo Bai Royaru)
- Genre: Action, mystery
- Anime television series
- Directed by: Itsuro Kawasaki
- Produced by: Akio Matsuda; Hideki "Henry" Goto; Yoko Matsuzaki
- Written by: Kazuki Matsui
- Music by: Masara Nishida
- Studio: TNK
- Licensed by: AUS: Madman Entertainment; NA: Geneon Entertainment (Defunct)
- Original network: Fuji TV
- Original run: January 9, 2003 – March 27, 2003
- Episodes: 12 + OVA

L/R: Licensed by Royalty is a Japanese anime television series written by Kazuki Matsui, directed by Itsuro Kawasaki, and animated by TNK.

The show is set in an alternate world where the United Kingdom and Ireland do not exist with Ishtar and Ivory taking their places with the rest of the world. It centers on Cloud 7, an intelligence organization whose mandate is to protect the Ishtarian Royal Family and their property from criminals/terrorists/assassins. The two main characters of the show are Jack Hofner and Rowe Rickenbacker, who are known in the intelligence world and by criminals, terrorists and assassins as L/R. The series focuses mainly on the protection of Noelle Ardelade, a 14-year-old girl from Ivory as she has links to the Ishtarian monarchy.

The title name is changed from the original Japanese title, L/R: Licensed by Royal, for North America and Europe.

== Plot ==
Jack Hofner and Rowe Rickenbacker, Cloud 7's top agents, are mandated to protect the Ishtarian royal family and their reputation while also protecting their property from crime and terrorism. While a few of their cases involved the protection of royal artifacts and royal family affiliates, Jack and Rowe were tasked by Commander Camille Freed to secure Noelle Ardelade, a girl of Ivory Island and candidate for the "15-year princess". As time passes, the two agents become involved in solving cases of corruption, bombings and murder that could rock the Ishtar nation. Jack and Rowe, working under Mister's orders, are placed in a black operation to expose top officials of DTI and Duke Regent Rand for their involvement in the assassination of Prince Sparda who found that there were illegal dealings in securing Ivorystone from Ivory Island. The two agents fake the assassination of Noelle in front of a live audience, which is also televised worldwide, in order to arrest the Duke and DTI Chairman Taylor for the prince's death.

The series ends with Noelle continuing her life as a civilian after her supposed death. While returning on an errand, Rowe is stabbed in the back by Frost, son of the former director of the now disgraced DTI. The ending is open to interpretation as to whether Rowe survived the stabbing.

== Characters ==
Cloud 7 is an intelligence agency mandated by the Ishtaran Royal Family to protect them and their property, under the control of the Royal Houseguard. Because of this, they are freely able to operate locally and abroad if the cases they are working on concerns the royal family. The agency is run by Holden Pennylane, known as Mister. Among the personnel of Cloud 7 are Jack Hofner, Rowe Rickenbaker, Claire Pennylane and Desmond (Dez) McCarthy. Their headquarters is located in downtown Ishtar.

The main heroes of L/R: Licensed by Royalty. From left to right: Rowe Rickenbacker and Jack Hofner.

Jack Hofner (ジャック・ヘフナー, Jyaku Hefunaa)
Voiced by: Hiroaki Hirata (Japanese); Freddy Douglas (English)
Jack Hofner is one of the agents working for Cloud 7 and one of the members of the L/R duo. He is a blonde-haired man, cool, relaxed and sophisticated, enjoys smoking and wears a white suit with a yellow and blue dress shirt. He works closely with his partner Rowe Rickenbacker, and previously worked with Claudia Eastman.
His symbol on the Cloud 7 gameboard is a Roadster token for when he is summoned to headquarters.
Rowe Rickenbacker (ロウ・リッケンヴァッカー, Rowo Riikenbackaa)
Voiced by: Yuji Ueda (Japanese); JB Blanc (English)
Rowe Rickenbacker is also a secret agent working for Cloud 7 and the partner of Jack Hoffman. He is more outspoken Jack and has brown hair tied in a ponytail and wears a red shirt and a black trench coat. Like Jack, he smokes when he is not on an operation. Rowe is a master of disguise is most likely to work undercover wearing one of his many disguises. At the end of the series, Rowe was stabbed in the back by a disgraced Frost after the ex-DTI Information Director secretly followed him. It is unknown whether Rowe survived the attack.
His symbol on the Cloud 7 gameboard is a boot, which was never used in the series.
Mister Holden Pennylane (ミスター / オールデン・ペニーレイン, Misuta Alden Pennylein)
Voiced by: Akio Ōtsuka (Japanese); W. Morgan Sheppard (English)
Mister is the head of Cloud 7 and a retired secret agent who was appointed by Camille Freed to run the agency. He was a close friend of the former Prince Sparda and his family His full name is Holden Pennylane and has a daughter named Claire Pennylane, who also works with Cloud 7.
His symbol on the Cloud 7 gameboard is a Top hat token.
Claire Pennylane (クレア・ペニーレイン, Kureia Peniirein)
Voiced by: Megumi Toyoguchi (Japanese); Siobhan Flynn (English)
Claire Pennylane is the daughter of Mister Holden Pennylane and is a member of Cloud 7. Generally she works in headquarters, running dispatches to call for Jack and Rowe whenever there is a debriefing. She sometimes goes into the field on missions and assists if Jack or Rowe need additional help. She is romantically attracted to Rowe Rickenbacker.
Desmond McCarthy (Dez) (デズモンド・マッカーシー, Dezumondo makkāshī)
Voiced by: Tadashi Tsuji
Dez is the developer of special weapons for Cloud 7 and provides L/R with technical support.
Ms. Camille (カミール女史, Kamīru joshi)
Voiced by: Masako Masaru
Camille Freed serves as captain of the Isharu Royal Chamber of Commerce and commander of Royal Houseguards. She is the daughter of Prince Sparda Freed and although she can be quite stern and authoritarian, she has a kind heart.

== Media ==
=== Music ===
The opening sequence of the L/R, "Go where no ones gone before" by Billy Preston, was released on a CD single on February 3, 2003, under the JVC Victor label. The ending sequence of L/R, "Negai no Toki" by Mikako Takahashi, was released on January 22, 2003, under the same label.

Two OSTs were released on the show, consisting of VOCAL SIDE and INST SIDE. VOCAL SIDE was released on February 21, 2003, with 13 tracks under JVC Victor. INST SIDE was released on the same date with 18 tracks under the same label.

=== Drama CD ===
Two Drama CDs were released consisting of L SIDE and the R SIDE. The L SIDE was released on March 21, 2003, under JVC Victor. The R SIDE was released on the same day. The premise centers on some missions from Jack and Rowe's perspectives. Both of these CDs have the TV version of "Go where no ones gone before" while the VOCAL SIDE has the full version.

=== Anime ===
L/R: Licensed by Royal had originally aired on Fuji Television from January 8, 2003, to March 26, 2003, without the fourth episode, making it a 12-episode run. Another run was placed on AT-X from July 17, 2006, to October 9, 2006, with the full run of 13 episodes including the DVD-only episode "Sweet enemies in the same desert". Production of the series was done under TNK.

Broadcast No.	DVD No.	Title	Original air date
1	1	"Be traced" Transliteration: "Ningyo no Ashi" (Japanese: 人魚の足)	January 9, 2003
Jack and Rowe board an airship to investigate the proposed illegal sale of a replica "mermaid's foot", an Ishtar sacred object. The royal family is trying to remove these replicas from the market and Jack and Rowe suspect Professor Freud and his assistant Linda are the sellers. Jack and Rowe fake the death of their buyer, but Freud and Linda implement an elaborate plan to pretend the object was stolen from them. However, Jack and Rowe are not fooled and Linda, a professional bodyguard, attacks Rowe, but they are defeated and caught.
2	2	"A Taste of Secret"; Transliteration: "Mitsu no Aji" (Japanese: 蜜の味)	January 16, 2003
International actor and Cloud 7 agent Moriya Kou, is abducted by the Schwartz Stravinsky of the Hornet crime syndicate to find the location of the Empest Conference and assassinate the world's intelligence bureaus' chiefs. Jack and Rowe infiltrate Hornet headquarters and free Moriya, but they are captured and then try to cause confusion about the real location of the conference. Moriya is a actually double-agent, and after overhearing Jack and Rowe communicate with Cloud 7, he signals the location to Stravinsky who then sends his forces there. However, the information is incorrect, and when Stravinsky and his forces arrive at the false location, they are surrounded and captured by Ishtar troops.
3	3	"A Girl Goes to City"; Transliteration: "Shōjo, to e iku" (Japanese: 少女、都へ行く)	January 23, 2003
Jack and Rowe are introduced to Commander Camille and asked to escort Noelle Adelaide, one of the reject "15-year Princess" candidates, back to Ivory Island in the utmost secrecy to avoid the media. On the train journey to the island, they encounter Drisden, the rude director of the Ivorystone mining company. Noelle reveals that her grandfather is the caretaker of island's iconic clock tower which has been damaged in a recent storm and the island lacks funding to repair it. Jack and Rowe deposit Noelle at the railway station, but she returns to the capital and begins busking to raise money for the island's clock tower.
NA	4	"Sweet enemies in the same desert" Transliteration: "Sabaku no Saiten" (Japanese: 砂漠の祭典)	April 25, 2003
The Edelweiss satellite which is used for artillery testing in the Nabla Dunes area, under the control of the Dilmond dynasty, is due to be shut down for maintenance for 12 hours. Jack and Rowe are sent in to protect the royal treasures while the satellite is not functioning. When they arrive, they are fired upon by assassins dressed as just like themselves. They encounter more agents, and then are informed by headquarters that they are to compete against the other Cloud 7 agents to retrieve "Elisa's Crystal" to determine who will be awarded an exclusive contract working for the Royal Houseguard and Lord Miralio. Jack and Rowe successfully retrieve the crystal and all three teams manage to evacuate the area within the deadline.
4	5	"Tear Drop"; Transliteration: "Dōkoku no Jūdan" (Japanese: 慟哭の銃弾)	January 30, 2003
Actor Eric O'Connell is killed by the sniper Gray F. Stratos, known as Tear Drop, while on board a cruise ship. By coincidence, Rowe encounters Stratos' daughter Leila at a city fountain and takes her to Cloud headquarters. Dez plants a bug under her cup and when she returns home, Cloud 7 learn that Gray's target will be at a banquet. However both his daughter Leila and Claire are captured. At the banquet, Jack and Rowe discover that they are the targets, but they avoid being shot. They determine that Gray's employer is the crime boss Dice who has abducted Leila and Claire, and Jack goes to rescue them while Rowe goes after Gray.
5	6	"Lost Recognition"; Transliteration: "Kao no nai Sei Tenshi" (Japanese: 顔のない聖天使)	February 13, 2003
After a building explosion at a mining facility, the DTI corporation announces that it was caused by a malfunction in a cooling system. Jack and Rowe receive a tip off from Mark/Margaret that the explosion was deliberate, then DTI's executive director Taylor's car is bombed and Cloud 7 suspect the bomber called Angel. They are assigned to investigate, however Frost, Director of DTI's Information Management Division, says that they will handle it themselves. Nevertheless they examine a bomb threat note, which the DTI executive Claudia suggests means Sunday at midnight. Jack reveals to Rowe that he and Claudia were partners some years ago, but suspects that she is the bomber. She admits her attack on DTI because of its unprincipled practices, but she is then shot dead by one of their agents.
6	7	"Ivory"; Transliteration: "Kaigō no Hijiri Tenshi" (Japanese: 邂逅の聖天使)	February 20, 2003
A bomb explodes in a tower of the royal palace and Duke Regent Rand falsely announces that it was caused by an electrical fault. Commander Camille berates Cloud 7 for not apprehending Angel and preventing the bombing. Jack and Rowe examine an Ivory Island nursery rhyme which appears to provide clues to the bombings, and travel to the island. While ejecting Drisden from Tola's tavern, Jack and Rowe again meet Noelle. They realize that Ishtar and DTI make all the profits from Ivorystone mining, leaving the islanders with only their salaries to sustain them. Meanwhile, Duke Regent Rand realizes that Noelle really is the 15-year princes, and Istar troops attempt to capture her. Jack and Rowe fight them off and Camille lands on the island and acknowledges Noelle as the princess.
7	8	"Out of Phase"; Transliteration: "Omowaku no Sōtai" (Japanese: 思惑の相対)	February 27, 2003
Jack and Rowe are assigned to deal with Stephen Vincent, a crime syndicate courier, while Noelle is moved into the royal palace. The two agents also note that Noelle is also referred to as Angel, and the bombings have ceased since she moved to Ishtar. Meanwhile, Jack and Rowe track down Stephen Vincent and attempt to recover the Midnight Sun Emerald in his possession. They broadcast details throughout the palace which helps trap his accomplice Dent, when he arranges to meet Stephen Vincent to pick up the gem. He is caught by Jack and Rowe, however his girlfriend Matilda actually has the gem, and with Claire's help they apprehend her as well.
8	9	"Suspended Game"; Transliteration: "Gyakuten no Hōsoku" (Japanese: 逆転の法則)	March 6, 2003
Claire masquerades as Noelle at a baseball game so that Jack can take Noelle on an outing. Meanwhile, Rowe becomes trapped with a group of passengers in a cable car with the diabetic father of the great player, Maurice Butterfield. Through a great team effort, Rowe and the passengers manage to retrieve a medical package sent along the cable and save the sick man as well defusing a bomb on the cable car.
9	10	"The Discard"; Transliteration: "Gyakuzoku no Keifu" (Japanese: 逆賊の系譜)	March 13, 2003
A news item explains that Prince Spada Freed was imprisoned on charges of murdering his younger brother, and his wife Ciel Sado disappeared, the love between them transcending the rivalries between the two royal families. Noelle is still adjusting to her role as a princess, and Rowe realizes that she is not Angel, the bomber. Meanwhile there is mounting suspicion over Mister's meeting with Taylor from DTI during the baseball game. Rowe encounters one of the passengers from the cable car, which leads to an Ivory Island resistance group who he suspects is Angel. He lays a trap and apprehends them before they can detonate a bomb at a ceremony at which Noelle is the guest of honor.
10	11	"Tug of War"; Transliteration: "Zai no Fukinkō" (Japanese: 在の不均衡)	March 20, 2003
Mercenary Jude McManus is hired by DTI and proves his worth by defeating Rowe Rikenbacker, meanwhile Mister also joins DTI. Cloud 7 is removed from guarding the princess and DTI is given the task of protecting her. Later, Mister orders Rowe to kill princess Noelle on the day of her coronation. Coincidentally, Claire declares her love for Rowe and they kiss for the first time.
11	12	"A Day In The Life"; Transliteration: "Jūgonen no Zanzō" (Japanese: 十五年の残像)	March 27, 2003
Taylor of the DTI holds Mister Pennylane and Dez captive as he waits for Rowe to assassinate Noelle on Pennylane's orders. Meanwhile Camille receives information that the sniper Gray F. Stratos has entered the country. On the evening of the coronation, Noelle speaks to the people of Ishtar, telling the story of her heritage, but also how Duke Regent Rand made a secret agreement with DTI to jointly exploit the Ivorystone deposits. Suddenly Rowe rushes forward and shoots, and Noelle falls to the ground.
12	13	"Two of Us"; Transliteration: "Gunzō" (Japanese: 群像)	March 27, 2003
The citizens are shocked by Rowe's shooting of Noelle, although she is still alive. Rowe is caught and Taylor then announces that the assassination plot was carried out by the Royal Houseguard under the orders of Mister Pennylane. However, Camille reveals that the man captured is actually Taylor's own son Frost whom Jack and Rowe have disguised as Rowe. Pennylane also accuses Taylor of conspiring with Duke Regent Rand to frame Prince Spada. Panicked, Taylor sets of a series of explosions and escapes in the confusion, but he is caught by Jack and Rowe although he is shot by the sniper Stratos, as a public service and for earlier abducting his daughter. A short while later, Noelle has recovered from her gunshot wound and flies over Ivory Island which has a new clock tower, and where the mining lease is now controlled by the royal family. As Rowe is walking home with groceries, he is stabbed from behind by Frost, however Jack arrives and shoots Frost.

== Reception ==
=== Critical response ===
Zac Bertschy of Anime News Network commented that the work was an "undercooked" show, presenting a good dub while having trouble with episode structure and plot progression. He added that the opening theme song by Billy Preston was catchy because "[it's] probably one of the best anime theme songs from the past five years, mostly because it doesn't sound like an anime theme song". Adam Arseneau felt the series was "too dull to be intriguing or compelling, but too comfortable and easygoing to be a total failure". A critic for AnimePRO compared the "fluid and loose" exaggerated actions and fight scenes to Lupin III, and enjoyed the rapport between Jack and Rowe. They felt that the second volume had the right blend of action, an engaging story, and the right amount of humour.

Andrew MacLennan enjoyed the use of a British cast for the English dub, feeling it added to the espionage atmosphere, but felt that the story was not sufficiently engaging for an adult audience, despite the M rating. Tiffani Nadeau praised VOCAL SIDE's arrangement, saying that the CD flowed well from one track to the next, and Patrick King praised the variety in the songs, feeling the CD held up well even without the context of the series.

Bamboo Dong was one of many journalists to underscore the dub, citing it as "one of the best English dubs I've ever heard." Despite the general lukewarm response, Dub Review singled out the quality of the English dub as well and the authenticity of the British dialects, notably JB Blanc in his portrayal of Rowe.

== Awards and nominations ==
Year	Category	Recipient	Result	Ref.
2004	Anime Dub Recognition (ADR) Awards – Actor of the Month	JB Blanc	Won	
2004	Anime Dub Recognition (ADR) Awards – Performance of the Year by a Voice Actor	JB Blanc	Won	
