= The Advent Calendar =

2021 French film

- French: Le calendrier
- Directed by: Patrick Ridremont
- Starring: Eugénie Derouand
- Release date: 1 December 2021
- Running time: 104 minutes
- Countries: France; Belgium
- Language: French

The Advent Calendar (French: Le calendrier) is a 2021 French-Belgian horror film directed by Patrick Ridremont.

== Cast ==
- Eugénie Derouand - Eva Roussel
- Honorine Magnier - Sophie
- Clément Olivieri - William

== Reception ==
On review aggregator website Rotten Tomatoes, the film holds an approval rating of 82% based on 33 reviews, with an average rating of 6.7/10. The website's consensus reads: "It may not be the most effective holiday horror entry, but The Advent Calendar has its share of nasty treats for genre fans." Metacritic, which uses a weighted average, assigned the film a score of 51 out of 100, based on 4 critics, indicating "mixed or average" reviews.
