= JB Blanc =

French actor

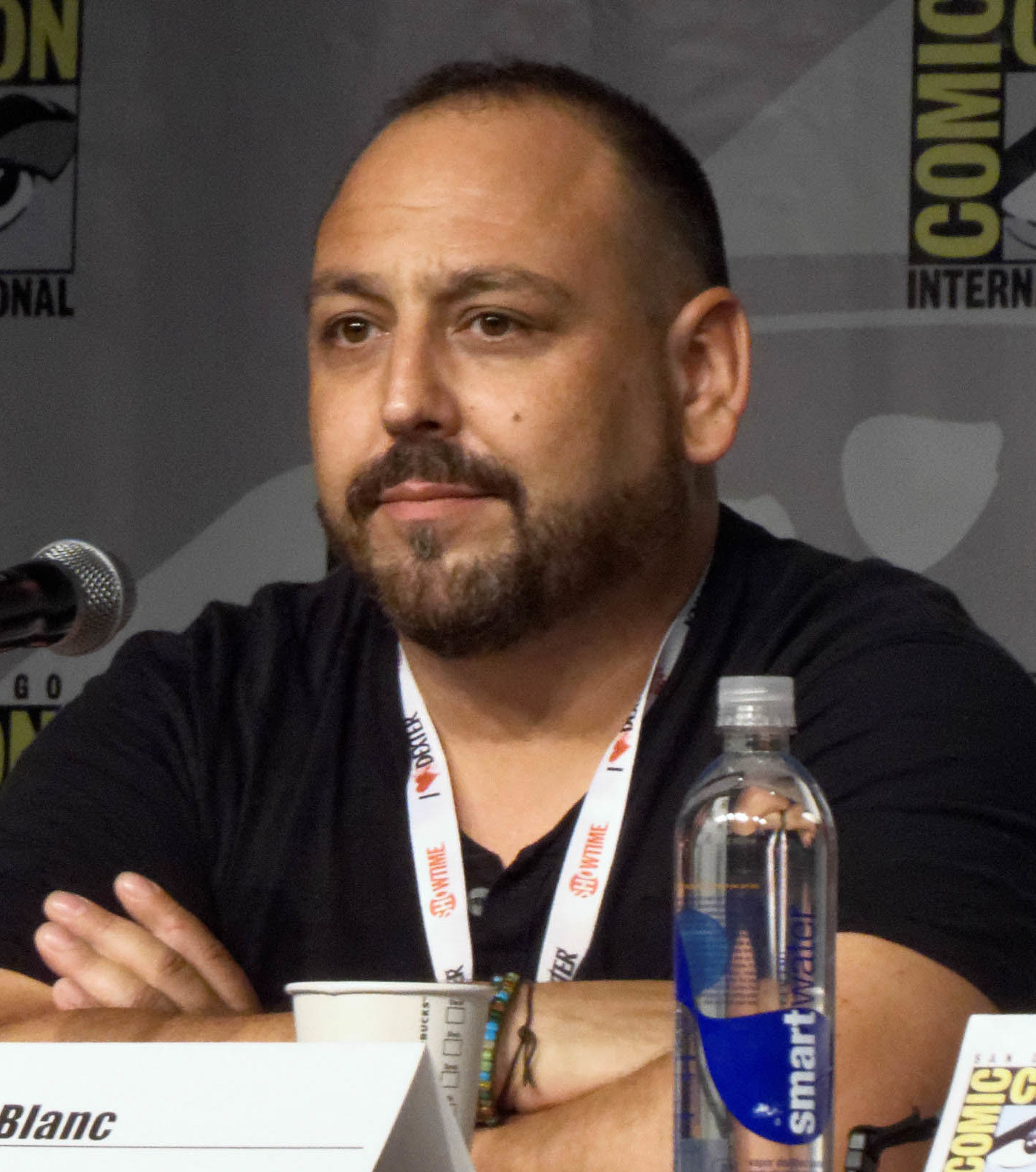
- Blanc at San Diego Comic-Con in 2013
- Born: Jean-Benoît Blanc; Paris, France
- Occupations: Actor; director
- Years active: 1990–present
- Children: 1
- Website: jbblanc.com

Jean-Benoît "JB" Blanc is a French actor who has worked on animations and video games in Los Angeles, coming from a drama education at the Royal Academy of Dramatic Art and with an extensive background in British theatre. He is most recognised for his recurring role on Breaking Bad and its spinoff, Better Call Saul as Gus Fring's Mexican cartel doctor, nicknamed unofficially "Dr. Barry Goodman", (Note: Television Academy, 2025. Alan Sepinwall: "Gus [Fring]'s doctor, the guy in Mexico [played by JB Blanc]. So, I'm going through my old show recaps, my old notes, and at a certain point, I realized — I should know this doctor's name. It's easier to refer to him that way. So I go to the Breaking Bad and Better Call Saul Wiki pages, and he is listed as Barry Goodman. And I'm like, 'Wait, first of all, how is this a name for a Mexican doctor? And second of all, why would they name a character on a show with Saul Goodman on it Barry Goodman?' So, I reached out to one of the writers on the show. I said, without context, 'I'm curious where the name Barry Goodman came from?' And the writer writes back, 'Wait, who's Barry Goodman?' Then I explained who it was, and they're like, 'There is no way we named that guy Barry Goodman.' He guessed that maybe the [actor's] agent changed it on IMDb or something, because it's always — if you talk to character actors — it's much better if their character has a name than if they're referred to by their job, just in terms of getting other work, because it looks more impressive on your resume.") as well as for lending his voice to Caustic in the long-running video game franchise, Apex Legends and Vander/Warwick in the highly-acclaimed Netflix animated series, Arcane where both the production team and cast have garnered positive attention. (Note: The Art and Making of Arcane: League of Legends, 2024, p. 206. "When it came to voice talent, the Arcane actors were chosen because they could, first and foremost, bring their characters to life.")

He made his voice directing debut on the English dub for L/R: Licensed by Royalty as well as provided the voice of Rowe Rickenbacker where he won a Performance of the Year Award by the Anime Dub Recognition Awards in 2004. The same year, he took over the role of Joe Carpenter from Crispin Freeman in the television series sequel to the OVA, R.O.D the TV, for which he was awarded a second Anime Dub Recognition Award (in this case, for Actor of the Month). He has interpreted the character of Enrico Maxwell in both Hellsing and Hellsing Ultimate, and has received recognition for his incarnation of Rubeus Hagrid in numerous Harry Potter video game adaptations. In 2023, he was awarded a Voice Arts Award for Outstanding Video Game Character by the Society of Voice Arts and Sciences for his work in Harry Potter: Magic Awakened. Blanc is also a voice director in video games and directs both live action performance capture and voiceover.

== Early life ==
Blanc was born in Paris, the son of an English mother and a French father. "My mother met a Frenchman when she was working for BB [Balenciaga, a retail chain] in Paris," Blanc related in a 2017 podcast interview with VO Buzz Weekly. "He swept her off her feet, and then she realised that he was very French... and so, they divorced when I was very young." Following the separation, he moved to England with his mother at the age of five "about halfway between London and Scotland — a little more towards Scotland [...] in a tiny little village in Yorkshire with about four hundred people." The family's financial situation was tight, therefore, he and his mother lodged with an aunt. His mother eventually remarried and he was chiefly raised by her and his stepfather. Blanc wouldn't reconnect with his birth father until much later in his life when he was twenty-four.

Although his parents would send him away to "a bit of a [boys only] posh private boarding school" when he was seven, he came from a working-class background. When his mother acquired a small inheritance, she was able to afford his schooling where he was educated at Bramcote School in Scarborough and Sedbergh School in Sedbergh, (Note: Bramcote School merged with Scarborough College in 2012.) (Note: The Independent, 2007. "Mr Blanc, a coach, actor and director who grew up in rural North Yorkshire...") staying there until he turned 18. "When you're a kid, you're just, 'Get me out of here, please'," he said. "And when I looked at my seven-year-old kid, I was just — I cannot imagine sending her away. But it was a different time."

Speaking of his childhood experiences, he has described that growing up French-speaking left him a social outcast in school. Because he was "slightly darker than the average kid" and spoke in a heavy French accent, he faced bullying and racial slurs. He said: "Growing up in the '70s and being a French kid wasn't pleasant in England [...] but I had to learn English properly to go to school and so, in order to not be different, I kind of eliminated any kind of hint of French there might be. [Even now] I always sort of sound culturally English, but my blood is very French — very much French." In 2007, when he was hired as a dialect coach for the American production of the English play, The History Boys, The Express found it bizarre that Blanc originated from Yorkshire, though also happened to be French.

For The Live Life video game/voice artist U.K. publication in 2021, he remembered: "Being a little overweight gave me a lot of shit [too]." To cope, he found escapism in drama and singing lessons, becoming Head Chorister in his school's choir, learning to play instruments and training in opera. He would add that "there weren't any performers or actors in my family." Despite this, he had his heart set on the performing arts, but in "the most impoverished kind in England."

Apart from the bullying from his peers, he sought mentorship from his "little revolutionary English teachers" and performed in school plays, namely Gilbert and Sullivan musicals and an American work, The Zoo Story by Edward Albee. One supportive teacher encouraged him to audition for the National Youth Theatre in London which, to 16-year-old Blanc, was "another world for us [in Yorkshire]." His audition proved successful and in 1987 at 18, he was accepted at the Royal Academy of Dramatic Art (RADA), the youngest person to do so that year. (Note: CCP News, 2013. Blanc: "I always loved being in plays at school, but I think I was 16 when I realized that I would never forgive myself if I didn't give it a shot... So I applied to RADA and got in somehow.") The drama institution was where he first met Victoria Harwood and he graduated in 1990. After a short sabbatical travelling, he then made his debut in professional theatre.

== Career ==
=== 1992–2002: Arts Threshold, National Theatre and The Count of Monte Cristo ===
Blanc began his professional stage career as a member of the Arts Threshold theatre company and worked mainly in the London fringe scene, collaborating with directors such as Rufus Norris, (Note: South China Morning Post, 1994. "Arts Threshold, The Lizzie Play, Fringe Club Theatre, January 14–19. [...] Jon Benoit (J. Vinnicum Morse) join[s] [Nicola] Blackwell...") Howard Davies (Note: Variety, 1997. "Production: A Royal National Theater presentation of a play in two acts by Arnold Wesker. Directed by Howard Davies. Cast: Jean-Benoit Blanc...") and Peter Hall at the Royal National Theatre. As an inexperienced actor in London, he has credited Judi Dench with mentoring him during his stint with the Royal National Theatre. (Note: The Live Life, 2021. Blanc: "At the National Theatre years ago, I was talking to Judi Dench and I said: 'Why do you always seem nervous about where you're next job is coming from? You seem to believe that you'll never work again.' She looked at me and said: 'You know JB, I think that's what keeps me honest.' It was then I learned that [acting] was a different energy...")

One of his first major credits was his portrayal of Mr Andrew Jackson Borden and "the Watcher" (later, he would alternate as Uncle J. Vinnicum Morse, a key player in the Borden trials) in the U.K productions and world tour of The Lizzie Play, based on Angela Carter's short story, "The Fall River Axe Murders". Written by Deirdre Strath, an American student of RADA, it was first produced in late 1992 to early 1993 by the Arts Threshold at the Gloucester Terrace in London as well as Scotland's Edinburgh Fringe Festival and directed by Rufus Norris, also a RADA alum. A subsequent staging in June 1993 was held at the Theatr Clwyd in North East Wales. Playwright Strath has mused that as a native of New York, the play was the first she had successfully staged in the U.K. since leaving RADA, which performed to sold-out houses. Actress Emma Thompson reported to the West Briton and Royal Cornwall Gazette that the play was "really gripping stuff" when she sat in the audience of one of the tour's Cornwall venues. In a review for the South China Morning Post, theatre critic Zelda Cawthorne praised the production staged at Hong Kong's Fringe Club Theatre during its world tour, writing that Blanc and lead actress Nicola Blackwell (as Lizzie Borden) performed "in a near-faultless display of ensemble acting. Director Rufus Norris ensures that [the play is] not for the squeamish."

Blanc received a taste for many Shakespearean plays, including 1992's The Comedy of Errors as Angelo — part of an ensemble that "aim[ed] to be a cut above the rest [and] put through their paces" under the direction of Renny Krupinski at the New Victoria Theatre and "a modern dress" interpretation of Romeo and Juliet at the New End Theatre in Hampstead which was performed in winter 1996. Directed by Simon Parry, Blanc portrayed the minor supporting role and friend to Romeo, Mercutio. Rejecting period set dressings, video monitors stood in place of a traditional Chorus, which displayed "sound bites and television news flashes of civil strife." John Thaxter, writing for The Stage, noted that the modern dressings were distracting and the casting was uneven, though the play still managed to offer "some sharp characterisations." Matthew Lewis (Note: No relation to the actor from Leeds.) and Joanne Mitchell were praised as the title leads while Blanc had "some of the best comic business" in his version of "a sophisticated bawd." Kate Basset for The Times was also displeased by the modern interpretation as well as the inclusion of mugging on housing estates. Though she added: "Some of this young company show real promise. Jean-Benoit Blanc's albeit beefy Mercutio has unflagging boisterous drive. He just needs a decent director to check his hyperactivity." Blanc recalled decades later: "I love that role [Mercutio]. Who doesn't like being killed at half-time? He's just really, really fun to play. Also, this was a role people didn't expect me to play, which was nice because often you don't get that challenge."

Blanc then reunited with Lizzie Play director Rufus Norris and playwright Deirdre Strath for a modern re-telling of Sleeping Beauty, retitled Waking Beauty, which opened at the Arts Threshold in mid-January 1995. Antonia Quirke, reviewing for The Stage, named the production "anarchic," commenting that "the action [of the story] was 'devised by the company'" within five weeks of rehearsals, even though Strath was credited for the writing. The cast replaced traditional fairytale dress with Reebok boots and hand-crafted wigs made of straw, which Quirke found "inspirational." The production was noteworthy, she added, for its "joyous exposure of the tricky little perversions frequently smudged in mainstream fairytales." Blanc also appeared in Love for Love, directed by Jon Harris at the New End Theatre in August 1995. Critic Paul Taylor of The Independent was unimpressed with the small stage placed closely to the audience's seats, the casting, which he felt was uneven and lacking chemistry between scenes, or the quality of line deliveries, which he described as "screamingly high pitch[ed]." However, he was partial to some of the performances, namely the leads and Blanc, writing: "[T]here are some extremely enjoyable characterisations, particularly that of Jean-Benoit Blanc as Valentine's blunt sailor brother, a nautical image-addict. [...] Arriving in Act 3, he comes as a tonic after all the mincing landlubbers."

In late 1996, he joined the Royal National Theatre company of Sir Peter Hall's self-prescribed "first thriller" Oedipus the King, called "the most influential play ever" by the Lincolnshire Echo, which premiered in Greece's Epidaurus Theatre before transferring to the Olivier Theatre. Re-adapted and translated by Ranjit Bolt, Hall's version had the cast wear masks and opted for "20th-century colloquialisms and irony [...] a very rich translation," quoted Hall, "which encourages the actors' intensity." The production was well-received and promoted nationally where it was revived with the original cast for Radio 4 in March 1997. He would also feature in an adaptation of Anton Chekhov's The Duel at the Lyric Studio in May 1997, starring Paul McEwan as Layevsky who raged "virtually against everyone" in the ensemble, "even the wonderfully jolly and philanthropic Doctor Samolyenko" interpreted by Blanc. The Times' James Christopher thought Blanc had "bluff appeal [as] a big-hearted army doctor who lets his alcoholic friend abuse his bar tab." In autumn 1997, he would go on to work with Howard Davies in his National Theatre revival of Arnold Wesker's Chips with Everything as the Second Corporal and showcased his musical talents by alternating in the orchestra, performing guitars and vocals. Variety, in a positive assessment, identified the cast as "a crackerjack [which] charge[d] ahead [...] even when the writing doesn't rise to the production," concluding: "Not since Noises Off has a cast's physical dexterity elicited such applause."

Blanc would eventually make his foray into professional opera, appearing in director Sarah Alexander's Cavalleria rusticana and Pagliacci at the Opera Holland Park Theatre in June 1998. Blanc's "well-rehearsed choral movement," said a review for The Stage, "provides a vivid impression of Sicilian village life," which played to a full house.

For over a decade, he almost exclusively worked in theatre before he dropped acting temporarily. He mentioned that on stage work "is the 'real stuff' because it's the best job in town, but I could barely pay my bills." For a time, he worked odd jobs, including construction work and in the sales department at a web design company to earn a stable income, where he recalled feeling miserable. "I was a part of this corporate world and it was horrible." He later elaborated on why he quit acting: "Even when you're working in professional theatre and I worked in some great theatres, including The National Theatre, it's still hard to make money."

After being contacted by an agent he knew in the U.K. for a role in a Hollywood production, he left his corporate job and was cast as the Italian bandit, Luigi Vampa in The Count of Monte Cristo for Touchstone Pictures, which he has named fondly as "the movie that brought me to America." Reviews were generally positive. Critic Walter Chaw expressed that Blanc "as [the] insouciant pirate king" Vampa was "a character greatly expanded from the novel though still underused." Roger Moore of Desert Dispatch felt that Blanc's performance was "droll in the extreme," calling his line deliveries "classic."

=== 2002–2013: Anime dubs, Western animation and American theatre ===
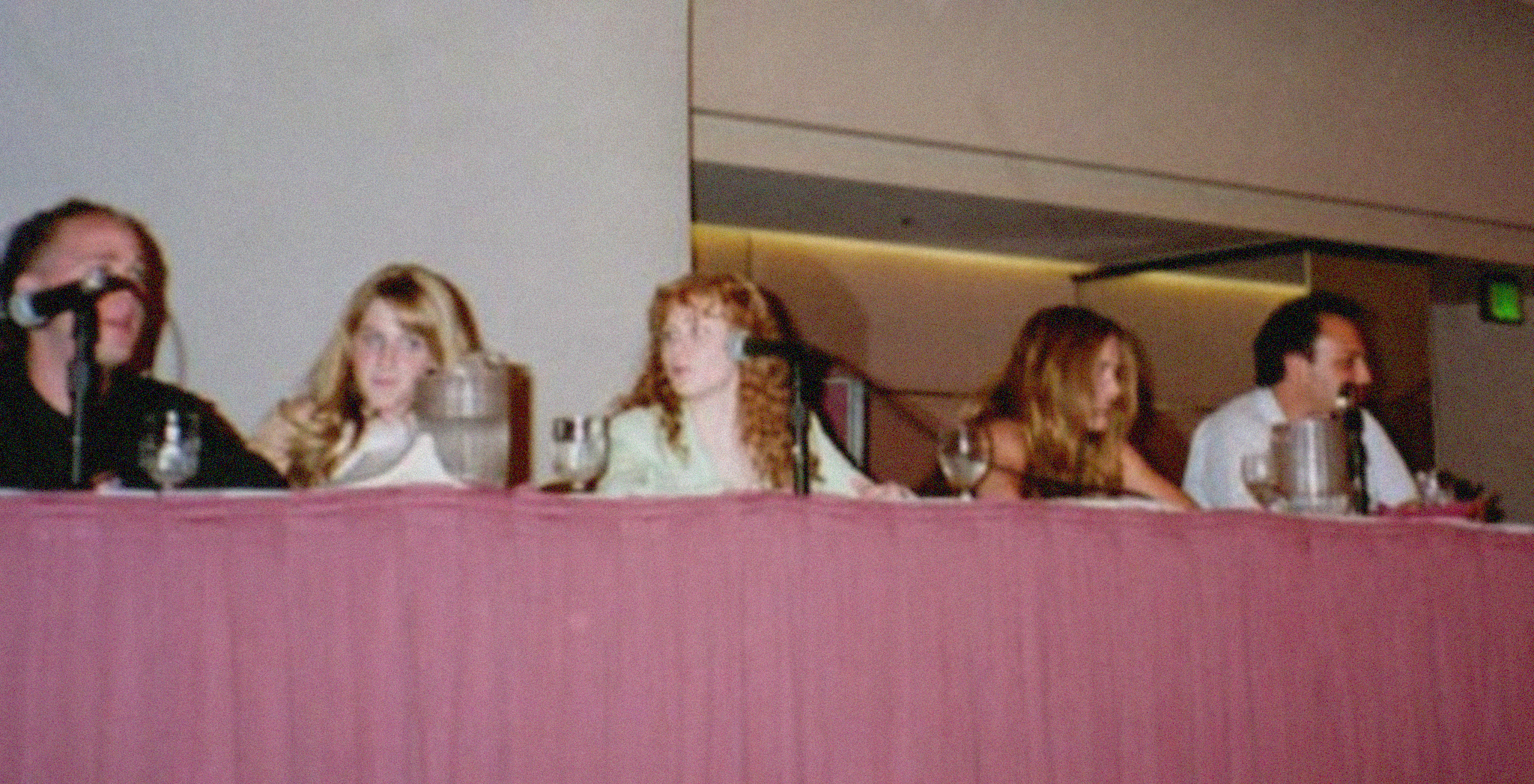
Taliesin Jaffe (ADR director), Rachel Hirschfeld (Anita), Jessica D. Stone (Junior), Siobhan Flynn (Wendy) and JB Blanc (Joker) at the R.O.D the TV panel at Anime Expo in Anaheim, California (3 July 2005).

Since relocating to the United States in 2001, he entered voice acting through connections with his friend from RADA, Victoria Harwood. "[I] met [Victoria] twenty years ago [at RADA]," said Blanc in a 2006 interview included with the DVD extras of Hellsing Ultimate. "And I think I was genuinely eighteen — sweet and eighteen and very naïve," he continued. "And then she just took me under her wing and she was my greatest friend. [...] And then when I moved to L.A., she was the only person I knew here. [...] She's introduced me to the world of anime." Harwood recommended Blanc to the staff at New Generation Pictures during their casting phase for Hellsing, and he was ultimately cast in the English dub. (Note: Hellsing Review, 2018: "Additional voice talents like JB Blanc... etc [sic] while their parts are changed compared to its original source material they each do a great job with the roles they are given...") According to ADR director and script adapter Taliesin Jaffe, Blanc was cast on the spot. He happened to be present at the studio for an entirely separate reason when the first session recordings were well underway. Blanc was immediately called into the room by Jaffe for a phone audition with the production team in Japan (a screening process that was agreed upon by both the Japanese and American productions in order to select the best fit for the characters' voices). "[It] was very strange," remembered Blanc. "And then, I just did [all of my scenes] in a day or two." He filled a small role as "the Cheddar Priest" in Episode 1, returning in later segments as Enrico Maxwell, a member of the Vatican and rival of Sir Integra Hellsing. He has said that the anime dubbing industry is "where I got to know Crispin Freeman, Taliesin Jaffe, Liam O'Brien, Sam Riegel and all those people from early anime gigs. It was a very fond time in my life."

Blanc's relationship with New Generation Pictures led to a co-starring role in L/R: Licensed by Royalty and a main villain role, Joe "Joker" Carpenter in R.O.D the TV, which gained him some recognition in the anime community. Zack Bertschy of Anime News Network said favourably of the English dub for L/R: "New Generation elected to find a completely British cast for this show and the results are astounding and refreshing." Writing for Dub Review, Nathan Thorell said: "Rowe is able to handle anything coming his way, just like JB Blanc did in this role." Though apart from voicing Rowe, Blanc worked behind the scenes as voice director. In an interview with Jonathan Klein, vice president of New Generation Pictures, he explained that the production team wanted to "add that sort of British flair to [the show]," based on the original source material. "We didn't just have a British cast this time," he continued, "we got a British director, too: J.B. Blanc, who's done a lot of excellent work both on-camera and off. He vocal coached the American actors we had, as well." Blanc won two Anime Dub Recognition (ADR) Awards for his work on the show, including Actor of the Month (May 2004) and Performance of the Year by a Voice Actor (2004).

According to the production extras that came with the American DVD release of R.O.D the TV, Blanc commented: "When [voice director Taliesin Jaffe] talked to me about the character of Joker in Read or Die [after working on L/R], I had to stop myself from saying 'yes!' before he'd finished the pitch. What actor wouldn't jump at the chance to play the gentleman villain?" Behind the scenes, Blanc juggled his skills as an actor and teacher, working closely as an accent coach with some of the non-British cast, namely Jessica D. Stone who played Joker's youngest field agent, Junior, in order to perfect their dialects. Blanc would interpret his character, Joker beyond an archetype for which he was given an Anime Dub Recognition (ADR) Award for the December 2004 release of Volume 4, adding that "like most evil people, he sincerely believes in his cause and each action he takes seems to him to be the most natural thing in the world." Due to this approach, Way Jeng of Mania emphasized that "Joker's cool demeanor is very natural" in an otherwise "fantastic [dub]." He added that Blanc exhibited "one of the most appealing performances [of the show]. It's soft but carries a subtle edge" that wasn't afraid to delve into bitterness, explaining that his "sinister side provides the most enjoyable moments." By the finale, Jeng believed that "Joker's calm focus and unwavering vision [whenever his] obsession bubbles to the surface [...] have made him an extremely compelling villain" that avoided the trap of feeling "overplayed [...] which grounds the character." Anime Insider expressed similar sentiments. "Joker [has a] vision of a future free from crime and suffering [...] at the cost of all other culture and even all individual thought, and [he] does not hesitate to kill, lie, steal, cheat and even burn books to get there... all with a smile on his lips."

In 2005, Blanc appeared in a guest-starring role in Season 12 of NYPD Blue, portraying Alex Stratis, the son of a Greek immigrant and coffee shop owner who was murdered under mysterious circumstances. Amanda Wilson in a review admitted that episode fourteen was not "much to write home about," though the performances by the ensemble cast were singled out. "The story was crafted and acted well enough," she said, "prior to [the] revelation [about Alex's father] to make the moment something of a shocker." Additionally, he was set to appear in the film, Kiss Kiss Bang Bang, though his scenes were ultimately cut. The same year, his voice was featured in the Electronic Arts game, James Bond 007: From Russia with Love in the role of Pedro Armendáriz with a Turkish-Latin accent, which was released in November on PlayStation 2.

He returned to the stage in L.A., appearing in the ensemble of the World War II drama, iWitness, presented by Center Theatre Group and directed by Barry Edelstein at the Mark Taper Forum in April 2006, (Note: Jewish Sightseeing, 2006. "Even the jail guard, played by J.B. Blanc, seeks to convince Franz to change his mind.") which is set in 1943 within the confines of a single set — a Berlin prison — and was based on the final days and execution of Franz Jägerstätter, an Austrian farmer who was arrested and killed for refusing to support the Nazi Party; one "incriminating" act that he was accused of involved his defiance for not putting on their uniform. Joshua Sobol, the playwright, composed the play in his native Israel during the ongoing war between Israel and Palestine, drawing parallels to Jägerstätter and his comrades who wanted no part in the military occupation of Palestine. The Hollywood Reporter lauded the production, naming Blanc's performance as Sgt. Bastian "first-rate." Theatre critic Jeff Favre felt the opposite, writing that the acting was melodramatic and the tone too bleak for its nearly two-hour runtime, especially Blanc's prison guard stories of the guillotine told to the protagonist to dissuade him from his inevitable sentence. He was also cast as the supporting character Leon in Tristan & Isolde, directed by Kevin Reynolds and released by 20th Century Fox in January 2006.

In November 2007, due to his background living in North Yorkshire, he was brought on as a dialect coach for the American premiere of the English play, The History Boys, directed by Paul Miller at the Ahmanson Theatre, (Note: Variety, 2007. "... in [the actors'] many group scenes, bolstered by JB Blanc's strong coaching in the difficult Northern England Sheffield dialect...") which the Yorkshire Post noted would be "interesting to judge how successful he has been" once the play opened in the States, acknowledging Blanc's Yorkshire upbringing, though arguing that Yorkshire has a wide range of accents spread across a few miles, from Sheffiled to Holme Valley. Blanc commented that the origin of an accent was the core to authenticity, not the sounds alone, which he instilled in the young American cast — all deriving from various backgrounds and U.S. states — in an intense rehearsal that lasted five weeks, plus a full reading that was scheduled at the Music Center in early October. As homework, Blanc produced a CD for the cast to practice vocal exercises when not in the rehearsal space as well as assigned viewings of such films as The Full Monty. Reportedly, some of his choices in exercises were less appropriate with a single goal in mind: "[W]ith a little practice you'll be able to say any word that rhymes with 'luck' like a dyed-in-the-wool Sheffielder," which the cast treated with humour, even when criticized profanely when blundering through their dialects repeatedly. Although he had originally signed onto the production for two weeks, his role as a coach was extended all the way through dress rehearsals. The play opened on 14 November and ran until early December. Later that month, he co-starred in the L.A. Theatre Works' production, Major Barbara, directed by Dakin Matthews at the Skirball Cultural Center. He worked as a dialect coach once again for The Fountain Theatre's production of Victory, directed by Stephen Sachs, opening in January and closing on March 9, 2008, which transferred to Los Angeles after well-received stagings in South Africa and the Edinburgh Festival in Scotland, respectively in 2007.

In 2009, an English dub licensed by Viz Media of mangaka Naoki Urasawa's critically-acclaimed Monster was set to air on Syfy's Ani-Mondays Block as well as the Chiller television network. Later in the season, Blanc was featured as Roberto, Johan Liebert's unhinged follower and survivor of the Cold War experiment, Kinderheim 511. The themes and characters have been widely praised. Carl Kimlinger of Anime News Network positively received the "veracity" of the Japanese voice cast as well Viz's English version. "Viz goes for a similar level of anal fidelity," he said. "Their English adaptation is one of their most carefully cast and deliberately accurate in recent memory. [...] The performances range from good [...] to superb." Writing for CBR, Daniella Fois interpreted of the series finale that "Roberto's sole anchor that keeps him from completely drowning in nihilism [is his childhood memory of hot cocoa]," thus, adding layers to his role as a secondary villain. However, she noted, Roberto's memory "is also the same reason that Johan deems him unworthy to see the scenery for a doomsday. Because Roberto, unlike Johan, is not truly empty. He only claims to be." Blanc was also featured as the hero's deceased father, Alighiero in Visceral Games' Dante's Inferno, released by Electronic Arts in early 2010, and joined the American production of The Train Driver, a play by South African writer Athol Fugard, as a dialect coach for the Africaans dialects, which was directed by Stephen Sachs at the Fountain Theatre from October through December 2010.

In 2012, he starred as Al Capone in the 1920s short film, The Lift, directed by Lyndon Barrois. At the 14th Annual Independent Filmmakers Showcase Film Festival held in Santa Monica, Blanc was awarded Best Actor for his performance. He also joined the creative team of The Fountain Theatre, working as a dialect coach for the Los Angeles premiere of the play, In the Red and Brown Water. The same year, he lent his voice to the English dub of the French animated film, A Cat in Paris, playing a low-time criminal, Victor Costa who is responsible for leaving the heroine fatherless. Writing for ScreenAnarchy, critic Jim Tudor called Blanc a "fiend [who] is an intrinsically watchable loon." He praised his take on a gangster, saying his performance "at least in spirit [hails] from the Joe Pesci/Goodfellas school of psycho mob nut with his own crazed obsession." Betsy Sharkey of the Los Angeles Times was notably mixed in her review, believing the film struggled in finding its tone, not knowing when to "be serious or silly," though went on to single out the animation and characterizations, which were boasted by recognizable performances. Gil Mansergh, on the other hand, was left confused by Blanc's depiction, pointing out that Costa is, obviously, meant to be French — "albeit with a Cockney accent."

He would return to the world of Hellsing with the release of the OVA, Hellsing Ultimate which aimed to readapt the manga faithfully (compared to the thirteen-episode television series), reprising his dual roles as the Cheddar Priest and Enrico Maxwell, respectively. The majority of the original cast and crew reunited for the Japanese production as well as the American team heading the translation. New Generation Pictures was again responsible for the English dub with Taliesin Jaffe serving as ADR director and Jonathan Klein producing. "It was the first voice gig I did in the U.S.," said Blanc on the DVD extras. "[Enrico is] slightly Italian, dangerous, fantastically fun to play, ingratiating while he's killing you, he's just a great character." Commenting on his return to the franchise, Blanc was quoted: "[Hellsing Ultimate is] bigger and camper [sic] and there's more of Enrico Maxwell which, you know, I'm always happy with. [...] It's good to come back to something that feels familiar, and yet it's having its boundaries pushed further and further."

Though only ten episodes long, each episode held a one-hour runtime with a lengthy production period that spanned seven years, switching between several animation studios and two American distributors. The first set of episodes premiered in late 2006, dropping physically on DVD (though scheduled inconsistently) until it aired on Starz Edge in early 2008. The show later appeared on Adult Swim's Toonami block, which ran all segments until late 2014; the final two episodes were eventually given a DVD and Blu-Ray release the same year. Bamboo Dong of Anime News Network felt that the OVA was "pretty incredible." However, he criticized the quality of the English dub, saying: "[F]ans were psyched that some of the British characters were recorded using British voice actors [in the original TV series] but that wasn't done across the board," emphasizing the weakness of K.T. Gray's South London dialect. A British reviewer held a similar perception, commenting: "It doesn't matter when the majority of the main cast are of British origin when the voices are still filtered through a Hollywood mindset of what UK accents should be." Despite the criticisms, Behind the Voice Actors would award the English dub with a Best Vocal Ensemble nod as well as individual nominations for some of the cast, including a Best Male Supporting Vocal Performance for Blanc in 2012.

He would later portray Alfred Pennyworth in the Cartoon Network series, Beware the Batman, which was promoted at San Diego Comic-Con along with the game, Saints Row IV, and aired from 2013 to 2014. The show was praised for its "predictably solid" vocal performances as well as the individual personalities the cast embedded in their characters, recognised by the Pennsylvania publication, Reading Eagle. As Deacon Frost in the anime adaptation of the Marvel Comics property Blade, Wichita Anime Examiner thought that Blanc "did a great job voicing him as he has this low growl of a voice." While the majority of the performances for Marvel Anime's Iron Man title received criticism from the Chicago Geek Culture Examiner for the lack of believability, John Eric Bentley was noted for being "spot on" as Nick Fury as well as Blanc as Ezekiel Stane, who's performance was "properly creepy." He had also aided the development of a sci-fi/action web series project, Subject 5 through the promotional "Subject Five Con," created by artist LaQuita Cleare.

=== 2014–present: Hollywood, Breaking Bad, Video games and Arcane ===
Blanc was cast in the Colombian-American joint produced indie film, Bastards y Diablos, directed by A.D. Freese, which was screened at the Los Angeles Film Festival in 2015. While Blanc never makes an appearance onscreen, he portrays the main characters' deceased father Gabriel, speaking to his sons through voiceover in fluent Spanish. Though the film was received favourably by Sheri Linden of The Hollywood Reporter, she noted less enthusiastically: "The somewhat heavy-handed poeticism of Gabriel's voiceover commentary, delivered in the rich baritone of J.B. Blanc, takes some getting used to." In March 2015, it was confirmed that Blanc had joined the cast of War Dogs (originally titled Arms and the Dudes), directed by Todd Phillips, playing an Albanian driver named Bashkim opposite Jonah Hill and Miles Teller. In summer 2016, he lent his voice to the Academy Film Archive, under the aide of Audio Mechanics engineer, John Polito with the purpose of restoring damaged or missing sound reels recorded for classic pre-Code films, notably the Howard Hughes feature, Cock of the Air. Other actors of the preservationist project involved Martin Hinkle and Hamish Linklater.

He has since appeared in television series such as Barry, which has earned praise, (Note: Vocal Media, 2022. "JB Blanc did a noteworthy job in the confrontation with Hank.") Masters of Sex, Shameless, Nikita, Cold Case, CSI: New York, Raising the Bar, The Unit, Crash, Prison Break, Dr. Vegas and The Company.

Blanc has appeared in films, including The Incredible Hulk, Pirates of the Caribbean: At World's End, and Moonlight Serenade. He has done voice-work for video games such as Minecraft: Story Mode, Dante's Inferno, Darksiders, Wildstar and James Bond 007: From Russia with Love, in which he played Turkish agent Kerim Bey. In 2013, he voiced Zinyak and Phillipe Loren in Saints Row IV. In 2014, he voiced Commander Kuben Blisk in Titanfall.

He made his debut in Breaking Bad as Gus Fring's Mexican cartel doctor in the third half of Season 4 and reprised his role in the spin-off, Better Call Saul, marking his debut in Episode 3 of Season 3. While the character was written into the show to serve as a plot device for Walter White's climax with Gus, thus functioning as a minor supporting role, Collider stated that Gus' Doctor was one of many underrated characters in Vince Gilligan's franchise. "Although Barry may be a convenient plot device on the surface, his rounded performance and dry humor give him and Gus' cartel overall a believability worthy of the world." He also voiced Caustic in Apex Legends in 2019.

In 2021, it was announced that Blanc had joined the voice cast of Arcane, based on the characters and lore of the popular game, League of Legends. He was one of a few cast members who were asked to return from the original game, though as a different character, filling the role of Vi and Powder's adoptive father, Vander, the "peacemaker" of the Lanes who meets a horrific end early in the series as he is betrayed by his "brother," Silco. Co-creator Christian Linke commented of the casting: "There is definitely a family of voice acting talent that has been part of the League of Legends world who were happy to find ways to bring them back in Arcane." Blanc would return in Season 2 as the voice of Warwick and a younger Vander in flashbacks. Cameryn Barnett of Collider praised the writing and animation of Vander/Warwick, noting that his "beastly return [in Season 2] marks a tragic end for his character." Likewise, The Quinnipiac Chronicle argued that the voice acting for Season 2 was so realistic that viewers would be hard pressed to forget that the characters were only drawings, yet still manage to be believable and relatable.

== Personal life ==
He lives in Los Angeles with his daughter, Malia and was once married to author Cynthia Bond, a relationship in which his friend, Victoria Harwood had encouraged. "She's responsible for most of the misery in my life," joked Blanc in a 2006 interview. Though separated, Bond included him in the acknowledgements of her 2015 novel, Ruby, saying he had an "unyielding beacon" in the years she had known him.

Blanc has been an avid participant in Los Angeles charity events. He was one of many voice actors signed with New Generation Pictures that auctioned several autographed items in September 2009 in order to raise funds for a seven-year-old boy who was severely injured in a traffic accident. When the 2011 Tōhoku earthquake and tsunami caused massive devastation in Japan, veterans of the anime voiceover industry, Blanc included among them, organised the "We Heart Japan" fundraiser in downtown Sunset Boulevard at Meltdown Comics, sending all donations to the Japan NGO Earthquake Relief and Recovery Fund for the victims. "Like everyone, you know, around the world, we've all been very deeply affected by events in Japan over the last week," Blanc commented in a radio interview on 91.8 The Fan. (Note: 91.8 The Fan, 2011. Blanc: "We have a very special event in Los Angeles tomorrow night at 8 'o clock at Meltdown Comics...")

In October 2016, Blanc, along with several voice actors under SAG-AFTRA, went on strike, protesting poor working conditions and inadequate pay. Blanc said: "They led off undervaluing what we provide to the video game industry." He was further quoted: "My performance is an indelible print on the game. It's my gestures, my features. The intellectual property I'm putting into the game is the same as an actor on camera."

In July 2024, Blanc stood his ground with a second actors' strike over the lack of protections against the rise of artificial intelligence in the industry, saying: "[AI] is the biggest existential threat I think we've ever faced as actors."

== Filmography ==
=== Theatre ===
Year	Title	Role	Notes
1988	The Caucasian Chalk Circle	(as Jon Benoit)	directed by Richard Williams at the Royal Academy of Dramatic Art (RADA), London
1989	Charley's Aunt	(as Jon Benoit)	directed by John Normington at the Royal Academy of Dramatic Art (RADA), London
1991	The Taming of the Shrew	Lucentio, Troilus the Mongrel (as Jon Benoit)	directed by Caroline Eves at the Arts Threshold, Gloucester Terrace, London
1992	On the Way to the River	Larson (as Jon Benoit)	directed by Juli Mahr at the Arts Threshold, Gloucester Terrace, London
1992	The Jolly Potters	(as Jon Benoit)	at the New Vic Theatre, Newcastle-under-Lyme
1992	The Comedy of Errors	Angelo (as Jon Benoit)	directed by Chris Martin and Renny Krupinski at the New Vic Theatre, Newcastle-under-Lyme and the Victoria Theatre, Stoke-on-Trent
1992–93	The Lizzie Play	Mr Borden, the Watcher, J. Vinnicum Morse (as Jon Benoit)	presented by Wink Productions, directed by Rufus Norris at the Arts Threshold, Paddington, London and National Tour, UK
1993	The Love of a Good Man	(as Jon Benoit)	at the Arts Threshold, Gloucester Terrace, London
1994	The Lizzie Play (International Tour)	J. Vinnicum Morse (as Jon Benoit)	presented by Wink Productions, directed by Rufus Norris at the Fringe Club Theatre, Lower Albert Road, Central, Hong Kong
1994–95	Waking Beauty	(as Jon Benoit)	directed by Rufus Norris at the Arts Threshold, Gloucester Terrace, London
1995	Love for Love	Ben (as Jean-Benoit Blanc, in reviews, Jon Benoit, in ads)	directed by Jon Harris at the New End Theatre, UK
1995–96	Romeo and Juliet	Mercutio (as Jean-Benoit Blanc)	directed by Simon Parry at the New End Theatre, UK
1996	Oedipus Plays: Oedipus the King	Chorus/Company (as Jean-Benoit Blanc)	directed by Peter Hall at the Royal National Theatre, Olivier National Theatre, UK
1996	Oedipus Plays: Oedipus Colonus	Chorus/Company (as Jean-Benoit Blanc)	directed by Peter Hall at the Royal National Theatre, Olivier National Theatre, UK
1996	Mary Stuart	Officer (as Jean-Benoit Blanc)	directed by Howard Davies at the Royal National Theatre, National Theatre Lyttelton, UK
1997	Chips with Everything	Second Corporal, Guitar, Vocals (as Jean-Benoit Blanc)	directed by Howard Davies at the Royal National Theatre, National Theatre Lyttelton, UK
1997	Amy's View	Ensemble/Understudy (as Jean-Benoit Blanc)	directed by Richard Eyre at the Royal National Theatre, National Theatre Lyttelton, UK (featured Judi Dench)
1997	The Duel	Doctor Samolyenko (as Jean-Benoit Blanc)	the Lyric Studio, UK (featured Paul McEwan
1998	Flight	Comrade Commander Bayev (as Jean-Benoit Blanc)	directed by Howard Davies at the Royal National Theatre, Olivier National Theatre, UK
1998	Cavalleria rusticana	(as Jean Benoit-Blanc)	directed by Sarah Alexander at the Opera Holland Park Theatre, UK
1998	Pagliacci	(as Jean Benoit-Blanc)	directed by Sarah Alexander at the Opera Holland Park Theatre, UK
2006	iWitness	Bastian, Mussoff	written by Joshua Sobol, directed by Barry Edelstein at the Mark Taper Forum, Los Angeles
2007	The History Boys	Dialect Coach	directed by Paul Miller at the Ahmanson Theatre, the Music Center, Los Angeles
2007	Major Barbara	Bill Walker, Dialect Coach	directed by Dakin Matthews at the Skirball Cultural Center, Los Angeles
2008	Victory	Dialect Coach	directed by Stephen Sachs at The Fountain Theatre, Los Angeles
2009–10	The Complete Works of William Shakespeare (Abridged): The Comedy of Errors	Angelo	presented by the Reduced Shakespeare Company at the New Victory Theater, New York City
2010	The Blue Room	Dialect Coach	presented by Solocat Productions, directed by Elina de Santos at The Odyssey Theatre, Los Angeles (Note: The Blue Room Theatre Program, 2010. "... credits include: Theatre: Shining City, Coming Home, Photograph 51, Gem of the Ocean, Accomplices, Victory (Fountain Theatre), The Importance of Being Earnest, Summer and Smoke, Major Barbara (LA Theaterworks), The History Boys, iwitness (Mark Taper Forum, CTG), The Oedipus Plays, Mary Stuart, Chips With Everything, Flight (Royal National Theatre, London), The Duel (Lyric, London), Romeo and Juliet, Love for Love (New End Theatre, London), The Lizzie Play (World Tour), The Taming of the Shrew, The Phantom Lady, Julius Caesar, The Love of a Good Man (Arts Threshold, London), A Comedy of Errors (New Victoria, Stoke).")
2010	Loot	Dialect Coach	presented by The Ensemble Theatre Company, directed by Jonathan Foxat the Alhecama Theatre, Santa Barbara
2010	The Train Driver	Dialect Coach	directed by Stephen Sachs at The Fountain Theatre, Los Angeles
2010	Tartuffe	Ensemble	presented by L.A. Theatre Works Radio Theatre Series on 89.3 KPCC
2011	A House Not Meant to Stand	Dialect Coach	directed by Simon Levy at The Fountain Theatre, Los Angeles
2012	In the Red and Brown Water	Dialect Coach	directed by Shirley Jo Finney at The Fountain Theatre, Los Angeles
2012	The Blue Iris	Dialect Coach	directed by Stephen Sachs at The Fountain Theatre, Los Angeles
2013	Cyrano	Backer/Producer	presented by The Fountain Theatre and Deaf West Theatre, directed by Simon Levy at the New York Theatre Workshop, New York City
2014	Unscreened 2014 Summer Theater Series: H40+1	Various	directed by Daria Polatin at the Lillian Theatre, Hollywood (featured Nikolaj Coster-Waldau)
2015	Cardamom	Various	presented by the Piece Project, directed by Devon Gummersall at the VS. Theatre Company, Los Angeles
2023	Last Summer at Bluefish Cove	Backer/Producer	directed by Hannah Wolf at The Fountain Theatre, Los Angeles

=== Voice over roles ===
==== Anime ====
Year	Title	Role	Notes
2002	Hellsing	Enrico Maxwell, Cheddar Priest	
2003	Strawberry Eggs	Fortune Teller	
2004	L/R: Licensed by Royalty	Waiter, Rowe Rickenbacker	
2004	R.O.D the TV	Editor B (Ep. 10), Joe "Joker" Carpenter	
2005	Daphne in the Brilliant Blue	Lee, Leonskii	
2005	Ghost in the Shell: S.A.C 2nd GIG	Rod (Ep. 40)	
2005	Naruto	Pakkun, Jiga, Hashirama Senju, Additional Voices	
2006	Bleach	Makizō Aramaki, Sajin Komamura (Ep. 99+), Nakeem Greendina, Demora, Patros, Genga, Ginrei Kuchiki, Additional Voices	
2006	Gun Sword	Domingo	
2007	Blue Dragon	Lt. Dragnov	
2007	Texhnolyze	Mizuno	
2008	Code Geass: Lelouch of the Rebellion R2	General Upson (Ep. 6), Kolchak (Ep. 7)	
2008	Freedom Project	Chairman (Ep. 7), Additional Voices	
2009	Monster	Roberto	
2010	Kekkaishi	Ichirou Ogi, Ohdo (Eps. 43–44)	
2010	Kurokami: The Animation	General Gustav (Eps. 13, 16), Howard (Ep. 14)	
2011	Marvel Anime: Blade	Deacon Frost	
2011	Marvel Anime: Iron Man	Prof. Michelinie	
2011	Marvel Anime: Wolverine	Omega Red, Master Koh	
2011	Mobile Suit Gundam Unicorn	Alberto Vist, additional voices	
2012	Persona 4: The Animation	Ryotaro Dojima	(as John White)
2013	Hellsing Ultimate	Science Expert (Ep. 8), Enrico Maxwell, Cheddar Priest	
2013	Digimon Fusion	KingWhamon, AncientVolcanomon, Pharaohmon	
2014	Naruto: Shippuden	Hiruko, Pakkun, Gataro Hashirama Senju (Ep. 226)	
2017	Marvel Future Avengers	Ares, Ursa Major	
2021	Dota: Dragon's Blood	Terrorblade	

==== Animation ====
Year	Title	Role	Notes
2010	Black Panther	Batroc the Leaper, Black Knight, Male Cannibal, additional voices	
2011–2012	The Avengers: Earth's Mightiest Heroes	Wrecker, Heimdall, additional voices	
2013–2014	Beware the Batman	Alfred Pennyworth, Batcomputer, Key, Lunkhead, additional voices	
2014	Transformers: Rescue Bots	Ansel Ambrose	Episode: "Phantom of the Sea"
2014	Ultimate Spider-Man	Titus, Chitauri	Episode: "The Return of the Guardians of the Galaxy"
2014	Avengers Assemble	Mangog	Episode: "All-Father's Day"
2014–2016	TripTank	Various voices	
2015	Hulk and the Agents of S.M.A.S.H.	Red Ghost	Episode: "The Defiant Hulks"
2015	Be Cool, Scooby-Doo!	Colander, Vic	Episode: "Party Like It's 1899"
2015–2016	Turbo Fast	Aiden Hardshell, Ari Goldfish, Snail Vendor	2 episodes
2015–2017	Guardians of the Galaxy	Titus	4 episodes
2016–2017	DreamWorks Dragons	Ryker, Jarg	22 episodes
2017	Penn Zero: Part-Time Hero	Captain of the Guard	Episode: "Rockullan, Papyron, Scissorian"
2017	All Hail King Julien	Various voices	11 episodes
2017	Jeff & Some Aliens	Alien Video Host, Butler	Episode: "Jeff & Some Laughs"
2018	Califia and the Timeless Sentries	William Tell	Web series
2018–2019	Kung Fu Panda: The Paws of Destiny	General Fang, Blue Dragon	13 episodes
2019	OK K.O.! Let's Be Heroes	Coach	Episode: "Planet X"
2019	Scooby-Doo and Guess Who?	Antiques Dealer	Episode: "Ollie Ollie In-Come Free!"
2019, 2025	Love, Death & Robots	Supervisor, British Man, Jeoffry	2 episodes
2020	The Owl House	Professor Hermonculus	Episode: "I Was a Teenage Abomination"
2021	Arcane	Vander, Warwick, Bolbok	7 episodes
2021–2022	Dota: Dragon's Blood	Terrorblade, additional voices	13 episodes
2023	Kung Fu Panda: The Dragon Knight	Nigel	2 episodes
2024	Blood of Zeus	Rhadamanthus	2 episodes
2025	The Mighty Nein	Ruzimir, additional voices	
2025	Tomb Raider: The Legend of Lara Croft	Kane	

==== Film ====
Year	Title	Role	Notes
2006	Bleach: Memories of Nobody	Jai	English dub
2007	Bleach: The DiamondDust Rebellion	Sajin Komamura	English dub
2008	The Incredible Hulk	Hulk, Abomination	Uncredited
2008	Bleach: Fade to Black	Sajin Komamura	English dub
2009	Redline	Lynchman	English dub
2010	Naruto Shippuden the Movie: The Lost Tower	Mukade, Anrokuzan	English dub
2010	Bleach: Hell Verse	Sajin Komamura	English dub
2011	El Gran Miagro (The Greatest Miracle)	Don Chema	
2012	A Cat in Paris	Victor Costa	English dub
2012	Delhi Safari	Director, Prime Minister	English dub
2012	009 Re:Cyborg	007, Great Britain	English dub
2013	Iron Man: Rise of Technovore	Obadiah Stane	English dub
2013	Berserk: The Golden Age Arc III – The Advent	Silat	English dub
2014	Avengers Confidential: Black Widow & Punisher	Orion	
2015	The Snow Queen 2: Magic of the Ice Mirror	Guard	
2016	Sheep and Wolves	Louis	English dub
2016	Lego Scooby-Doo! Haunted Hollywood	Atticus Fink, Director	
2017	Justice League Dark	Merlin, Abnegazar	
2017	The Jetsons & WWE: Robo-WrestleMania!	Usher Robot	
2018	The Last Prince of Atlantis	Professor	
2019	Spies in Disguise	Agency Employees, Agents	
2021	Earwig and the Witch	Mr. Jenkins	English dub

==== Video games ====
Year	Title	Role	Notes
2001	James Bond 007: Agent Under Fire	Nigel Bloch	
2003	Cabela's Dangerous Hunts	Dimitri Benedek	
2003	Naruto: Clash of Ninja Revolution 3	Sasori (Hiruko)	
2003	Star Wars: Knights of the Old Republic	Additional Voices	
2004	EverQuest II	Additional Voices	
2004	World of Warcraft	Ignis, Imperator Mar'gok	
2005	James Bond 007: From Russia with Love	Kerim Bey	
2006	Bleach: Shattered Blade	Arturo Plateado	
2006	SOCOM: US Navy SEALs Fireteam Bravo 2	Condor	
2007	Naruto: Ultimate Ninja 2	Traveling Merchant	
2007	Team Fortress 2	Saxton Hale	
2008	Bleach: The 3rd Phantom	Arturo Plateado, Sajin Komamura	
2008	Command & Conquer: Red Alert 3	Guardian Tank, Mirage Tank	
2008	Klonoa	Ghadius	
2008	Naruto: Ultimate Ninja 3	First Hokage, Hashirama Senju	
2008	Persona 4	Ryotaro Dojima	
2008	Street Fighter IV	El Fuerte	
2008	Tales of Vesperia	Barbos	
2008	Wanted: Weapons of Fate	Chicago Grunt, French Grunt	
2008	World of Warcraft: Wrath of the Lich King	Mage-Lord Urom, Ignis the Furnace Master	
2009	Coraline	Sergei Bobinsky	
2009	Final Fantasy XIII	Cocoon Inhabitants	
2009	League of Legends	Braum, The Heart of the Freljord	
2009	Naruto: Ninja Council 4	Sasori (Hiruko)	
2009	Naruto: Ultimate Ninja 4	Sasori (Hiruko)	
2009	Naruto: Ultimate Ninja 5	Sasori (Hiruko)	
2009	Resident Evil: The Darkside Chronicles	Brian Irons	
2010	Dante's Inferno	Alighiero	
2010	Darksiders	Ulthane	
2010	Despicable Me: The Game	Dr. Nefario	
2010	Sengoku Basara: Samurai Heroes	Additional Voices (Warriors)	
2010	Super Street Fighter IV	El Fuerte	
2010	World of Warcraft: Cataclysm	Asaad, High Priest Venoxis	
2011	Assassin's Creed: Revelations	Tarik Barleti	
2011	Infamous 2	Various	
2011	Uncharted 3: Drake's Deception	Thugs	
2011	Uncharted: Golden Abyss	Roberto Guerro	
2011	WildStar	Caretaker, Ionis the Watcher, Luminai Male	
2012	Assassin's Creed: Liberation	Roussilon	
2012	Darksiders II	Thane, Valus, Angel Hellguard	
2012	Diablo III	Diablo	
2012	Fuse	Luther Deveraux, Scientists	
2012	Kingdoms of Amalur: Reckoning	Nyralim	
2012	Resident Evil 6	Enemies	
2012	World of Warcraft: Mists of Pandaria	Riko, Commander Durand, Manchu	
2013	Ben 10: Omniverse 2	Incursean Scout	
2013	Batman: Arkham Origins	Bane	
2013	Saints Row IV	Emperor Zinyak, Phillipe Loren	Also contributed to the soundtrack as DJ.
2013	Ingress	Roland Jarvis	
2013	Killer Is Dead	Victor	
2013	Knack	Dr. Vargas	
2013	Lego Marvel Super Heroes	Captain Britain, Kraven the Hunter, Heimdall	
2013	Lightning Returns: Final Fantasy XIII	Additional voices	
2013	Metal Gear Rising: Revengeance	Boris Popov	
2013	Metro: Last Light		English Voice Talent
2013	Skylanders: Swap Force	Spy Rise	
2013	The Wonderful 101	Wonder-Yellow, Gah-Goojin	
2014	Far Cry 4	Additional voices	
2014	Game of Thrones	Malcolm Branfield, Thermund, Father Tuttle	
2014	Guilty Gear Xrd Sign	Slayer	
2014	Hearthstone	Various Minions	
2014	Lego Batman 3: Beyond Gotham	Swamp Thing, Arkillo, The Penguin, Bane	
2014	Middle-earth: Shadow of Mordor	Tower of Sauron, Thuggish Orc	
2014	Mother of Myth	Acis	
2014	Skylanders: Trap Team	Spy Rise, Hood Sickle	
2014	The Amazing Spider-Man 2	Wilson Fisk / Kingpin	
2014	The Crew	Omar	
2014	The Elder Scrolls Online	Sheogorath, King Kurog, Divyath Fyr, Male Altmer, Male Breton, Male Dunmer, Male Khajiit	
2014	Titanfall	Kuben Blisk	
2014	World of Warcraft: Warlords of Draenor	Additional voices	
2015	Batman: Arkham Knight	Chief Underhill, Edward Burke, Officer Thraves, Officer Anderson, Sergeant Badowsky, Harley Thugs	
2015	Code Name: S.T.E.A.M.	Grant, Milton, Newscaster	
2015	Evolve	Griffin	
2015	Infinite Crisis	Various	
2015	Lego Dimensions	Franz Krieger	
2015	Lego Jurassic World	Additional Voices	
2015	Mad Max	Additional voices	
2015	Minecraft: Story Mode - Season Two	The Admin/Romeo, Vos, Additional Voices	
2015	Rainbow Six Siege	Oryx	
2015	Skylanders: SuperChargers	Spy Rise, Hood Sickle	
2016	Batman: Arkham VR	Coroner, Thug	
2016	Batman: The Enemy Within	Bane, additional voices	
2016	Lego Marvel's Avengers	Trevor Slattery, The Other	
2016	Master of Orion: Conquer the Stars	Bulrathi Advisor, Meklar Advisor, Additional Voices	
2016	Skylanders: Imaginators	Spy Rise, Hood Sickle, Ambush	
2016	Titanfall 2	Kuben Blisk	
2016	Uncharted 4: A Thief's End	Knot	
2017	Fortnite	Dr. Vinderman, AI Vinderman, the Scientist (Season X), Chaos Agent (STW Dungeon:The Lab)	
2017	Horizon Zero Dawn	Rost	
2018	Call of Duty: Black Ops 4	Mercenary Announcer	
2018	Darksiders III	Various Voices	
2018	Fallout 76: Steel Dawn	Mr. Clark	
2018	Judgment	Ozaki, Mitsugu Matsugane	
2018	Lego DC Super-Villains	Bane, Penguin, Ra's al Ghul, Solovar	
2018	Spyro Reignited Trilogy	Moneybags	
2018	World of Warcraft: Battle for Azeroth	Captain Jolly	
2019	Apex Legends	Kuben Blisk, Caustic	
2019	Harry Potter: Wizards Unite	Rubeus Hagrid	
2019	Indivisible	Eurynomos	
2019	Metro Exodus	Yermak, additional voices	
2019	Mortal Kombat 11	Kano	
2019	Star Wars Jedi: Fallen Order	Prauf	
2020	Legends of Runeterra	Braum, Laurent Bladekeeper, Jack the Winner	
2020	Yakuza: Like a Dragon	Ryuhei Hoshino	
2021	Guilty Gear Strive	Slayer	
2021	Ruined King: A League of Legends Story	Braum, The Heart of the Freljord	
2022	Return to Monkey Island	Gullet	
2023	Hogwarts Legacy	Various characters	
2023	Star Wars Jedi: Survivor	Skoova Stev	
2024	Harry Potter: Quidditch Champions	Rubeus Hagrid	
2024	Lego Horizon Adventures	Rost	
2024	Wayfinder – Gloom Break: Founder's Season One	Wingrave	
2025	Date Everything!	Captain Jacques Pierrot, Narrator	
2026	Highguard	Trader Flynn	
2026	Castlevania: Belmont's Curse	Trevor Belmont	
2026	Star Wars: Zero Company	Kabb Uppercut	
TBA	Deadlock	Bebop	

=== Live action roles ===
==== Film ====
Year	Title	Role	Notes
1993	Shadowlands	Undergraduate	(Note: Uncredited)
2000	102 Dalmatians	Captain	
2002	The Count of Monte Cristo	Luigi Vampa	
2006	Tristan & Isolde	Leon	
2006	Garfield: A Tail of Two Kitties	Porter	
2007	Pirates of the Caribbean: At World's End	East Indian Clerk	
2009	Moonlight Serenade	Paul Holtzman	
2012	Red Dawn	Newscaster (voice)	
2015	Bastards y Diablos	Gabriel Rojas	
2016	War Dogs	Bashkim	

==== Television ====
Year	Title	Role	Notes
1998	Vanity Fair	Hussar	(as Jean-Benoit Blanc)
2004	Dr. Vegas	Fraser	Episode: "Lust for Life"
2005	NYPD Blue	Alex Stratis	Episode: "Stratis Fear"
2006	Prison Break	Jerry Curtin	Episode: "First Down"
2007	The Company	Manuel Pinero	2 episodes
2008	The Unit	Dr. Leon Rocha	3 episodes
2008	Crash	Father Donal	Episode: "Three Men and a Bebe"
2008	Raising the Bar	Johan Sharifi	Episode: "Bobbi Ba-Bing"
2010	CSI: NY	Tripp Walker	Episode: "Flag on the Play"
2010	Cold Case	Paul Shepard '10	2 episodes
2010	I'm in the Band	Agent Yurislavislavislavi	Episode: "Weasels on Deck"
2011–2012	Breaking Bad	Dr. Barry Goodman	2 episodes
2012	Vegas	Max Chandler	Episode: "Masquerade"
2013	Burn Notice	Ivan	Episode: "Brother in Arms"
2015	Shameless	Hanzi	Episode: "The Two Lisas"
2017–2018	NCIS: Los Angeles	Anzor Daudov	
2017–2020	Better Call Saul	Dr. Barry Goodman	3 episodes
2019–2023	Barry	Batir	5 episodes

=== Staff work ===
Year	Title	Role	Notes
2004	L/R: Licensed by Royalty	ADR Director	
2004	R.O.D the TV	Dialect Coach	
2004	World of Warcraft	Voice Director	
2009	League of Legends	Voice Director	
2014	Hearthstone	Voice Director	
2014	Lego Batman 3: Beyond Gotham	Voice Director	
2014	Middle-earth: Shadow of Mordor	Voice Director	
2015	Heroes of the Storm	Voice Director	
2015	Lego Dimensions	Voice Director	
2016	Overwatch	Voice Director	
2016	Mafia III	Voice Director	
2016	Uncharted 4: A Thief's End	Dialect Coach (Nadine Ross)	
2016	XCOM 2	Voice Director	
2017	Fortnite	Voice Director	
2017	Middle Earth: Shadow of War	Voice Director	
2020	Legends of Runeterra	Voice Director	
2021	Call of Duty: Vanguard	Voice and Performance Capture Director – Character Select	
2022	Diablo Immortal	Voice Director	
2023	Diablo 4	Voice Director	
2024	Rubber Soul	Dialogue Coach	
2024	Sugartown	Acting Coach, Executive Producer	
2024	The Informers	Dialect Coach	

== Awards and nominations ==
Year	Award	Category	Nominated work	Result	Ref.
2004	Anime Dub Recognition (ADR) Awards	Actor of the Month (May)	L/R: Licensed by Royalty	Won	
2004	Anime Dub Recognition (ADR) Awards	Actor of the Month (December)	R.O.D the TV	Won	
2004	Anime Dub Recognition (ADR) Awards	Performance of the Year by a Voice Actor	L/R: Licensed by Royalty	Won	
2005	Anime Dub Recognition (ADR) Awards	Dub of the Month (June)	R.O.D the TV (Vol. 7)	Won	
2007	Anime Dub Recognition (ADR) Awards	Dub of the Month (June)	Hellsing Ultimate (Vol. 2)	Won	
2012	14th Annual Independent Filmmakers Showcase Film Festival	Best Actor	The Lift	Won	
2012	Madrid International Film Festival	Best Actor in a Lead Role	The Lift	Nominated	
2012	Behind the Voice Actors (BTVA) Anime Dub Awards	Best Vocal Ensemble in an Anime Television Series/OVA	Hellsing Ultimate	Won	
2012	Behind the Voice Actors (BTVA) Anime Dub Awards	Best Male Supporting Vocal Performance in an Anime Television Series/OVA (Enrico Maxwell)	Hellsing Ultimate	Nominated	
2013	Behind the Voice Actors (BTVA) Voice Acting Awards	Best Male Supporting Vocal Performance in a Video Game (Bane)	Batman: Arkham Origins	Won	
2013	Behind the Voice Actors (BTVA) Voice Acting Awards	Best Vocal Ensemble in a Video Game	Batman: Arkham Origins	Nominated	
2013	Behind the Voice Actors (BTVA) Voice Acting Awards	Best Male Lead Vocal Performance in a Television Series – Action/Drama (Alfred Pennyworth)	Beware the Batman	Nominated	
2013	Behind the Voice Actors (BTVA) Voice Acting Awards	Voice Actor of the Year	Batman: Arkham Origins, Beware the Batman, Dragon's Crown, The Bureau: XCOM Declassified, Saints Row IV, The Wonderful 101, Killer Is Dead, Skylanders: SWAP Force, Lego Marvel Super Heroes, Ben 10 Omniverse 2, Knack, Lightning Returns: Final Fantasy XIII	Nominated	
2014	Behind the Voice Actors (BTVA) Anime Dub Awards	Best Vocal Ensemble in an Anime Movie/Special	Berserk: The Golden Age Arc III – The Advent	Nominated	
2014	Behind the Voice Actors (BTVA) Voice Acting Awards	Best Male Vocal Performance in a Television Series in a Guest Role – Action/Drama (Titus)	Ultimate Spider-Man	Nominated	
2014	Behind the Voice Actors (BTVA) Voice Acting Awards	Best Male Vocal Performance in a Television Series – Children's/Educational (Ansel Ambrose)	Transformers: Rescue Bots	Nominated	
2014	Behind the Voice Actors (BTVA) Voice Acting Awards	Best Vocal Ensemble in a New Television Series	All Hail King Julien	Nominated	
2014	Behind the Voice Actors (BTVA) Voice Acting Awards	Best Vocal Ensemble in a Video Game	Lightning Returns: Final Fantasy XIII	Nominated	
2017	Behind the Voice Actors (BTVA) Voice Acting Awards	Best Vocal Ensemble in a Video Game	Batman: The Enemy Within	Nominated	
2023	Society of Voice Arts and Sciences (SOVAS): Voice Arts Awards	Outstanding Video Game Character (Rubeus Hagrid) – Best Voiceover	Harry Potter: Magic Awakened	Won	
2023	Society of Voice Arts and Sciences (SOVAS): Voice Arts Awards	Outstanding Video Game Ensemble – Best Voiceover	Harry Potter: Magic Awakened	Nominated	
