= A Cat in Paris =

2010 film by Jean-Loup Felicioli and Alain Gagnol

- French theatrical release poster
- French: Une vie de chat
- Directed by: Jean-Loup Felicioli; Alain Gagnol
- Screenplay by: Alain Gagnol
- Dialogue by: Jacques-Rémy Girerd
- Produced by: Jacques-Rémy Girerd
- Starring: Dominique Blanc; Bernadette Lafont; Jean Benguigui; Bruno Salomone; Oriane Zani
- Edited by: Hervé Guichard
- Music by: Serge Besset
- Production companies: Folimage; Lunanime; Lumière; Digit Anima; France 3 Cinéma; Rhône-Alpes Cinéma; RTBF
- Distributed by: Gébéka Films (France); Benelux Film Distributors (Benelux); Agora Films (Switzerland)
- Release dates: 15 October 2010 (Saint-Quentin Ciné-Jeune Film Festival); 15 December 2010 (Belgium, France and Netherlands); 22 December 2010 (Switzerland)
- Running time: 65 minutes
- Countries: France; Belgium; Netherlands; Switzerland
- Languages: French; English
- Budget: $7.5 million
- Box office: $3.3 million

A Cat in Paris (French: Une vie de chat, lit. 'A Cat's Life') is a 2010 animated adventure crime comedy film by the French 2D animation studio Folimage, directed by Jean-Loup Felicioli and Alain Gagnol. An international co-production of France, Belgium, the Netherlands and Switzerland, the film follows a young Parisian girl whose cat leads her to unravel a thrilling mystery over the course of a single evening.

A Cat in Paris premiered at the Saint-Quentin Ciné-Jeune Film Festival on 15 October 2010. It was released theatrically on 15 December 2010 in France by Gébéka Films and in Belgium and the Netherlands by Benelux Film Distributors, and on 22 December 2010 in Switzerland by Agora Films.

The film was nominated for the Academy Award for Best Animated Feature.

== Plot ==
A black cat with red stripes leads a double life. During the night, he accompanies a cat burglar named Nico (who calls him Mr. Cat), who performs heists to steal jewels. During the day, he lives with a girl named Zoé (who calls him Dino). Zoé, who lost her voice after the loss of her father, has become distant from her mother Jeanne who works as a police superintendent, and is looked after by a nanny named Claudine.

Nico gives Dino a fish-shaped bracelet, which he passes on to Zoé. At the police station, Jeanne briefs her colleagues on protecting the Colossus of Nairobi statue, which cost her husband his life at the hands of the notorious Victor Costa. Victor Costa intends to have another go at the statue while it is being moved, with help from his codenamed accomplices, M. Bébé (Mr. Baby), M. Hulot, M. Grenouille (Mr. Frog), and M. Patate (Mr. Potato).

Back at home, Jeanne takes interest in the fish-shaped bracelet and brings it to her colleague Lucas. Lucas deduces that the bracelet matches up with burgled items from Rue Mouffetard. That night, Zoé sneaks out of her house and follows Dino. She spies Victor's lot, and finds Claudine is working for Victor and has been gaining insight on police movements. Zoé is spotted, but is rescued by Nico. Nico takes Zoé to hide in the zoo, but Victor's gang pick up her trail. Zoé escapes in a boat.

Lucas finds a lead on the robberies trailing directly to Nico's residence. When Nico returns to find Zoé at his place, he is arrested by Jeanne and Lucas, presumably having kidnapped Zoé. Jeanne leaves Zoé in Claudine's custody and goes with Lucas to find Victor. Unable to convince Jeanne and Lucas of Zoé's predicament, Nico escapes in order to find Zoé. Jeanne is able to confirm that Nico's claim about Zoé is true.

Claudine has taken Zoé to Costa's house, where she is locked away. Thanks to Claudine's perfume, Dino follows the scent and leads Nico to the house. Nico is able to whisk Zoé away after he cuts the power and dons his night goggles. Victor pursues Nico and Zoé to Notre Dame. Nico falls while trying to mislead Victor, but is saved by Jeanne, who has just arrived at the scene.

As Victor captures Zoé, Jeanne, with Nico and Dino, come to the rescue. Nico has to save Dino when Victor pushes the cat over the edge of a nearby crane, leaving Jeanne to confront Victor. Plucking up her courage, Jeanne saves her daughter and strikes Victor, putting him in a hallucinatory trance. Before Jeanne can help Victor, the gang leader swings from the crane to what he imagines is the Colossus of Nairobi, but falls to his death to a truck below. The rest of the gang, including Claudine, are arrested and Zoé regains her voice.

Nico reforms himself, gives up thievery, and becomes a member of the family, while Dino becomes the household pet. Nico gives Jeanne a snow globe with the Cathedral of Notre Dame in it as a Christmas present.

== Voice cast ==
Character	French voice	English voice
Jeanne	Dominique Blanc	Marcia Gay Harden
Claudine	Bernadette Lafont	Anjelica Huston
Nico	Bruno Salomone	Steve Blum
Victor Costa	Jean Benguigui	JB Blanc
Zoe	Oriane Zani	Lauren Weintraub
Lucas	Bernard Bouillon	Matthew Modine
Mr. Baby	Jacques Ramade	Mike Pollock
Mr. Hulot	Jean-Pierre Yvars	Philippe Hartmann
Mr. Frog	Patrick Ridremont	Gregory Cupoli
Mr. Potato	Patrick Descamps	Marc Thompson
Policeman #1	Yves Barbaut	
Zookeeper	Yves Barbaut	Mike Pollock
Old lady	Line Wiblé	Barbara Goodson
Frank		Marc Thompson
Dom		Eric Bauza
Dog owner		Eric Bauza

== Reception ==
On the review aggregator website Rotten Tomatoes, A Cat in Paris holds an approval rating of 83% based on 64 reviews, with an average rating of 6.8/10. The website's critics consensus reads, "A Cat in Paris depicts a stylish, imaginative world with a wonderful soundtrack and Hitchcockian overtones." Metacritic, which uses a weighted average, assigned the film a score of 63 out of 100, based on 20 critics, indicating "generally favorable" reviews.

Prior to the Oscar nomination, the film was little-seen in the United States, although it had its world premiere for the first time to the public as the grand opening matinee of an international children’s competition in the Championship Finals category for a young audience during the opening night of the Saint-Quentin Ciné-Jeune Film Festival’s Grand Opening Celebration’s Fanfare Highlights Showcase event as a special Ciné-Jeune headliner, becoming the first ever animated film in history to open the Saint-Quentin symposium and the showcase's "biggest opening night event in decades". The New York Times called it "a gorgeous hand-drawn feature that is one of the highlights of this festival. ... Without being too frightening, it projects a sense of danger, both physical and emotional, that is more engaging than the high-pitched thrills of the domestic films."

Web Behrens of Time Out Chicago gave the film four out of five stars, describing how "this cartoon noir distills Hitchcock into 64 brisk minutes for middle-schoolers and up"; the review elaborated that the film "announces its retro visual style with a dynamic title sequence that zips across the screen, bursting with Saul Bass-influenced dynamism."

== See also ==
- The Aristocats
- Gay Purr-ee
