= Vous êtes jeunes vous êtes beaux =

- Directed by: Franchin Don
- Written by: Franchin Don; Tarik Noui
- Produced by: Céline Zen
- Starring: Gérard Darmon; Josiane Balasko; Patrick Bouchitey; Denis Lavant; Vincent Winterhalter; Victor Belmondo; Cyrille Eldin
- Edited by: Thomas Maitrot
- Music by: Axel Guenoun
- Production company: KOI Films
- Release dates: 6 October 2018 (Festival International du Film de Saint-Jean-de-Luz); 2 October 2019
- Country: France
- Language: French

Vous êtes jeunes vous êtes beaux is a French drama directed by Franchin Don.

== Plot ==
Lucius Marnant is a retiree who feels that his life is three quarters behind him. Returning from a funeral, Lucius meets Lahire a young man who offers him to improve his daily life by participating in clandestine fights between old men. Very quickly Lucius takes a liking to this new life, to money and forgetting oneself and death.

== Cast ==
- Gérard Darmon: Lucius Marnant
- Josiane Balasko: Mona
- Vincent Winterhalter: Lahire
- Patrick Bouchitey: Aldo
- Denis Lavant: Monsieur Loyal
- Victor Belmondo: Alexandre
- Cyrille Eldin: Costa
- Marie Sambourg: Sarah

== Production ==
Principal photography on the film began on January 22, 2018, and lasted until March 2, 2018, in Colombes, Asnières-sur-Seine and Villeneuve-la-Garenne.
