= Alain Gagnol =

French film maker (born 1967)

- Born: 1967 (age 57–58); Roanne, Loire, France
- Occupation: Filmmaker
- Years active: 1997–present

Alain Gagnol (born 1967) is a French filmmaker. In January 2012, he was nominated for an Academy Award for the animated film A Cat in Paris. He also co-directed Phantom Boy.
