= Jean-Loup Felicioli =

French film maker

- Born: 1960 (age 64–65); Albertville, France
- Occupation: Filmmaker

Jean-Loup Felicioli (born 1960) is a French film maker. In January 2012, he was nominated for an Academy Award for the animated film A Cat in Paris. He also co-directed Phantom Boy.

Born in 1960 in Albertville, Felicioli studied at Schools of Fine Arts in Annecy, Strasbourg, Perpignan and Valence.
