= Animation Nation =

Annual film festival in Singapore

Animation Nation is an annual film festival in Singapore featuring animation feature films, short films, seminars and workshops. The festival was created by the Singapore Film Society in 2004 and took place every year until 2011. The 2025 edition will be held at the Alliance Française de Singapour, from 10 to 19 October.

Besides films from around the world, the festival also screens local animation works in a programme called Singapore Showcase. This is to promote talents in Singapore and bring awareness to the public.

== History ==
Animation Nation stopped in 2012 and returned in 2016.

In April 2025, Animation Nation collaborated with DreamWorks Channel for short film award 2025.

== 2004 (24 to 29 June) ==
=== Film Programme ===
Feature films

- Hair High (2004) by Bill Plympton
- A Winter's Tale / 冬の日 (2003) by Kawamoto Kihachirō / 川本 喜八郎 et al.
- My Life as McDull / 麥兜故事 (2001) by Toe Yuen
- Belleville Rendez-vous (2003) by Sylvain Chomet
- Matsumoto Leiji / 松本 零士 and Daft Punk's Interstella 5555: The 5tory of the 5ecret 5tar 5ystem (2003)
- Invasion: Anime (2002 documentary) by Angela Alexander

Selected Short films

- She and Her Cat: Their Standing Points / 彼女と彼女の猫 (1999) by Shinkai Makoto / 新海 誠
- Voices of a Distant Star / ほしのこえ (2002) by Shinkai Makoto / 新海 誠
- Doggy Poo / 강아지 똥 (2003) by Kwon Oh-sung
- Harvie Krumpet (2003) by Adam Elliot
- Father and Daughter (2000) by Michaël Dudok de Wit
- The Monk and the Fish (1994) by Michaël Dudok de Wit
- Tom Sweep (1992) by Michaël Dudok de Wit

== 2005 (17 to 23 November) ==
=== Selected Film Programme ===
- Wallace and Gromit: The Curse of the Were-Rabbit (2005) by Nick Park and Steve Box
- Wallace and Gromit short films: A Grand Day Out (1989), The Wrong Trousers (1993), A Close Shave (1995)
- Mind Game (2004) by Yuasa Masaaki / 湯浅 政明
- McDull, Prince de la Bun / 麥兜菠蘿油王子 (2004) by Toe Yuen
- The Place Promised in Our Early Days / 雲のむこう、約束の場所 (2004) by Shinkai Makoto / 新海 誠
- Jonathan Nix Animation Showcase
- Ninja Tunes Retrospective
- In the Realms of the Unreal (2004 documentary) by Jessica Yu
- The District (2004) by Áron Gauder
- Kakurenbo / カクレンボ (2004) by Morita Shuuhei / 森田 修平
- Aeon Flux shorts

== 2006 (16 to 22 November) ==
=== Festival Highlights (Bill Plympton Retrospective) ===
Director in attendance: Bill Plympton

=== Film Programme ===
Bill Plympton Retrospective

- Feature film The Tune (1992)
- Short films including Your Face (1987) and Guard Dog (2004)
- Bill Plympton's Animation Master class

Feature films

- Renaissance (2006) by Christian Volckman
- Paprika / パプリカ (2006) by Kon Satoshi / 今 敏
- Nagasaki 1945 – The Angelus Bells / 長崎 1945 アンゼラスの鐘 (2005) by Arihara Seiji / 有原 誠治

Selected Short films

- Animation Runner Kuromi / アニメ制作進行くろみちゃん (2001) by Daichi Akitarō / 大地 丙太郎
- Animation Runner Kuromi 2 (2004) by Daichi Akitarō / 大地 丙太郎
- Moongirl (2005) by Henry Selick
- The Moon and the Son: An Imagined Conversation (2005) by John Canemaker
- Yonna in the Solitary Fortress (2006) by Takeuchi Kengo / 竹内 謙吾
- Negadon: The Monster from Mars / 惑星大怪獣ネガドン (2005) by Awazu Jun / 粟津 順
- Best of Ottawa 2006
- studio aka showcase

== 2007 (23 November to 1 December) ==
=== Selected Film Programme ===
- Tekkon Kinkreet / 鉄コン筋クリート (2006) by Michael Arias
- Khan Kluay (2006) by Kompin Kemgumnird
- Blood Tea and Red String (2006) by Christiane Cegavske
- Tokyo Loop (2007)
- 5cm per second by Shinkai Makoto / 新海 誠
- Komaneko – The Curious Cat (2006) by Gōda Tsuneo / 合田 経郎
- I am a Bear (2006) by Gōda Tsuneo / 合田 経郎
- Gisaku (2006) by Baltasar Pedrosa
- Freedom Project (2006)
- Moebius Redux (2007) by Hasko Baumann
- The Pixar Story (2007) by Leslie Iwerks

== 2008 (24 October to 2 November) ==
The 5th Animation Nation festival was held from 24 October to 2 November 2008 at Alliance Française de Singapour and the National Museum of Singapore's Gallery Theatre. Other venues include the Fusionopolis and the library@esplanade.

=== Selected Film Programme ===
- The Piano Forest (2007) by Kojima Masayuki / 小島 正幸
- Sita Sings The Blues (2008) by Nina Paley
- Idiots and Angels (2008) with Hot Dog (2008) by Bill Plympton
- Genius Party (2008)
- Fear(s) of the Dark (2007) by Blutch, Charles Burns, Marie Caillou, Pierre Di Sciullo, Lorenzo Mattotti, Richard McGuire
- Tachigui: The Amazing Lives of the Fast Food Grifters (2006) by Oshii Mamoru / 押井守
- Nocturna (2007) by Víctor Maldonado and Adrià García
- One night in one city (2007) by Jan Balej
- Freedom Project 1 - 7 (2007)
- Dead Space: Downfall (2008) by Chuck Patton

== 2009 (14 to 21 October) ==
=== Selected Film Programme ===
- Secret of Kells (2009) by Tomm Moore and Nora Twomey
- Mary and Max (2009) by Adam Elliot
- Waltz with Bashir (2008) by Ari Folman
- Musashi: The Dream of the Last Samurai (2009) by Nishikubo Mizuho / 西久保 瑞穂
- Barefoot Gen / はだしのゲン (1983) by Masaki Mori / 真崎 守
- Barefoot Gen 2 / はだしのゲン2 (1986) by Hirata Toshio / 平田 敏夫
- From Inside (2008) by John Bergin
- A Town Called Panic (Panique au village) (2009) by Stéphane Aubier and Vincent Patar
- Pleasant Goat and Big Big Wolf: The Super Adventure / 喜洋洋与灰太狼之牛气冲天 (2009)
- Genius Party Beyond (2008)
- Usavich (2006-9) by Tomioka Satoshi / 富岡 聡
