= Tales of the Night =

Tales of the Night may refer to:

- Tales of the Night (TV special), a 1992 French silhouette animation television special
- Tales of the Night (film), a 2011 French computer silhouette animation film
- Tales of the Night (book), a 1997 story collection by Peter Høeg
