= Margo the Mouse =

Polish animated series

- Title card
- Created by: Eugeniusz Kotowski
- Written by: Jerzy Flisak; Leszek Mech; Renata Mech; Wladyslaw Nehrebecki; Ewa Kulig
- Directed by: Eugeniusz Kotowski
- Composer: Alojzy Mol
- Country of origin: Poland
- Original language: No dialogue
- No. of seasons: 1
- No. of episodes: 13

Production
- Executive producers: Aleksandra Kordek; Romana Mis
- Producers: Eugeniusz Kotowski; Otokar Balcy
- Running time: 10 minutes
- Production company: Studio Filmów Rysunkowych

Original release
- Network: TVP Polonia
- Release: 13 September 1976 – 18 November 1983

Margo the Mouse (Polish: Przygody Myszki) is a Polish animated series created and directed by Eugeniusz Kotowski. The animated series was made between 1976 and 1983, and was produced by Otokar Balcy.

Margo the Mouse stars a little Mouse called Margo (Myszka in the original Polish version) who lives in a big tree with her neighbours, a squirrel and a mole. It aired as part of the container TV animated series TVP Polonia.

== Description ==
It is the story and adventures of Margo, a little mouse who lives in a large tree made chalet. Small Margo has as neighbours Eliana, a squirrel who lives on the top floor; and Dennis, a dormouse that lives in the basement.

However, all is not happiness for Margo. The little mouse must deal with some enemies. One day, Eliana goes to visit her mother because she is sick and Margo must look after the house. Then, at night, a sullen owl settles in Eliana's house illegally. So Margo seeks ways to take the owl out of the house of her friend.

On another occasion, Margo prevents a beggar rat from occupying her home without her permission. Like while hiking should avoid being eaten by a stork. Although Margo has good friends like Anna, a sparrow; or Christophe, a cricket who likes to play the violin.

With her friends, Margo lives many adventures.

== Distribution ==
Telewizja Polska broadcast the animated series sporadically for seven years. In the 1980s, Margo the Mouse was sold for international distribution. In several European countries, the series was released direct-to-video, as in France, Russia or Germany where the series was titled with different names as Jeannette, la petite souris, Priklyucheniya myshki and Die kleine Maus Margot respectively and was made a feature film with a combination of some episodes. Due to the success of the film in several countries, in Poland it was decided to release it also like compilation movie in 1987. Something similar happened with Ciné si, the animated TV series by French director Michel Ocelot, who later premiered some fragments in his package-film Princes and Princesses. In Spain, the compilation film was released in 1990 and the TV series was broadcast on regional television channels in 2001. In France, the Netherlands and Switzerland, the TV series was released on DVD in the early 2000s, as did in the United Kingdom and the USA.

In United Kingdom, Margo the Mouse was released by GM Distribution with English subtitles. In North America, Margo the Mouse was distributed by Facets Video under the name The Adventures of Little Mouse although series is titled Margo the Mouse was aired on PBS in the USA. TV series was broadcast in Russia in 1989.

In Japan, Margo the Mouse was released as a compilation film, as Spanish and French edition and, later, this feature version was also released in Poland, officially. Przygody Myszki, film was distributed by Studio Ghibli in the collection of classic films of Ghibli Museum Library in collaboration with Disney and Cinema ANGELICA. Films like Moya Iyubov and The Humpbacked Horse of soviet Soyuzmultfilm animation studio are part of the same collection.

== Episodes ==
Number	Polish title	English title
1	Myszka nad wodą	Margo Over the Water
2	Myszka na wycieczce	Margo on a Trip
3	Wyprawa do lasu	Expedition to The Forest
4	Imieniny cioci	Aunt Adelina's Birthday
5	Myszka i mucha	Margo and the Fly
6	Myszka i samochód	Margo and the Car
7	Awantura z kretem	The Row of Mole
8	Koncert świerszcza	The Concert of Cricket
9	Myszka i bocian	The Mouse and the Stork
10	Myszka i kot	Margo and the Cat
11	Myszka i włóczęga	Margo and the Tramp
12	Myszka i sowa	Margo and the Owl
13	Zimowa wycieczka	Winter Trip
