= Margo the Mouse (film) =

- Polish film poster.
- Directed by: Eugeniusz Kotowski
- Written by: Jerzy Flisak; Leszek Mech; Renata Mech; Wladyslaw Nehrebecki; Ewa Kulig; Ida Paleta
- Produced by: Otokar Balcy; Eugeniusz Kotowski
- Cinematography: Stanislaw Golab; Dorota Poraniewska; Marek Raczek
- Edited by: Alojzy Mol; Bogdan Nowicki; Ryszard Sulewski
- Music by: Waldemar Kazanecki; Antoni Mleczko; Alojzy Mol; Bogumit Pasternak
- Production companies: Studio Filmów Rysunkowych; Film Polski
- Distributed by: Film Polski (Poland)
- Release date: 20 November 1987 (Poland)
- Running time: 78 minutes
- Country: Poland
- Languages: Polish; English; German; Dutch; Russian

Margo the Mouse (Polish: Przygody Myszki) is a Polish compilation movie from original TV animated series Margo the Mouse, created and directed by Eugeniusz Kotowski. It was produced as a feature-length film in 1985 and released in several countries since 1986. The movie was produced in 1985 and released that year in the former Soviet Union. In 1986, a year later, it was released in the former East Germany directly to video. Due to the good reception of the compilation movie, the film was released in its native Poland in 1987. Subsequently, this version was released to other countries.

The movie consists of eight episodes of the 1976 Polish animation television series Margo the Mouse.

== Plot ==
The movie is a selection of several episodes of the original television series Margo the Mouse and it has no dialogue. The film narrates the life of the beloved Margo, a little mouse that she lives in a tree located in a beautiful countryside. Other animals live in the tree, which are her neighbors. There's Eliana, a nice squirrel that lives on the top floor or Dennis, a dormouse that lives in the back of the tree. Margo will live incredible adventures in her day to day. It will not be easy experiences for Margo, since the little mouse will also have to face fearsome creatures like a giant fish, an evil stork or a sullen cat. Thanks to her intelligence and her friends, Margo will learn a life lesson in each moment that will help her grow and mature.

Between her experiences she will be helping her friend Eliana when she must go to take care of her sick mother, since an owl will invade the floor of the squirrel at night. Thanks to her intelligence and the help of a technical mole, Margo will be able to face the fearsome owl, which has caused all the neighbors to flee from the tree of the field. Another of her experiences will be to face a vagabond rat that he wants to throw her out of her own home. Without knowing anything, the tramp will hang around Margo's house to enter, throw her out and live at her expense. The vagabond will draw a plan to cause Margo to leave. In his plan, the vagabond will cause the chimney of the tree to spoil, as well as try to scare Margo during the night, as well as to scare the little mouse by putting a robot in the shape of a cat in her house. However, she is very intelligent and brave and does not get scared easily. When Margo leaves her house to visit some friends, the tramp will create a trap to expel the mouse from her house. However, the vagabond's ambition will be excessive and that will cause him to fall into his own trap.

Not everything will be bad experiences for Margo. In a sequence, Margo will visit her lovely Aunt Adelina to celebrate her birthday. During the journey, the little mouse will meet Jurand, a bitter beaver who will be very rude to her and her aunt. Margo and Adelina will teach him that he should be kinder to people, otherwise he will be left alone. In another moment, Margo and her friend Anna, a sparrow, will have to face an evil cat that he will want to eat them. One day, Margo invited her friend Anna to have tea at her house and then weave a tapestry with the melodies that Anna sang. Her pleasant song reaches the ears of the bad cat that he will want to eat the mouse and the sparrow. The cat will try to break the windows of Margo's house, also create holes to enter, but the intelligence and rapidity of the two friends will make their plans fail. However, when the cat decides to flood Margo's house with water, she decides to take out her gramophone and put a disc with barking dog sounds to scare the bad cat away.

Among her other adventures will be to defeat a terrifying stork that wants to eat it or face the owl that lives in an old castle. Thanks to her intelligence and the strong friendship she has with other characters, Margo will learn to live and mature at every moment.

== Production ==
Originally, TV series was broadcast sporadically between 1976 and 1983 on TVP Poland. After finishing TV animated series in 1983, Studio Filmów Rysunkowych decided to release Margo the Mouse in several countries. In 1985, the movie premiered in the former Soviet Union turned into a compilation movie with eight episodes of original TV animated-series. It's that compilation movie that premiered the same year in the former East Germany. Its good reception caused that it was re-released in Poland in 1987, as a compilation movie. The film, then, premiered in direct domestic format to video in several countries of the world such as France or Spain. In France it was premiered by Facets Video, while in Spain the license was held by Megavisión S.L.

Years later, in 2007, the film was part of the Ghibli Museum Library, the selection of television series, short films and international feature films that the prestigious Japanese animation studio, Studio Ghibli, distributes in Japan.

== Distribution ==
In the 80s, Margo the Mouse was sold for international distribution. In most of the countries where the film was released it went directly to video. In the former Soviet Union and in Poland it had a limited release in cinemas, in Poland it was distributed by Film Polski. The film was available in domestic distribution in several countries of the world in the 80s and 90s. Main protagonist, the little Mouse Myszka, was titled with differente names as Jeannette, Tina or Margo, her internacional and official name. Something similar happened with Ciné si, the animated TV series by French director Michel Ocelot, who later premiered some fragments as a package-film called Princes and Princesses. In Spain, the compilation movie was released in 1990.

In the early 2000s, the television series began to be distributed instead of the movie. For example, in Spain, Margo the Mouse TV series was broadcast on regional television channels in 2001. In France, the Netherlands and Switzerland, the television series was released on DVD in the early 2000s, as did the UK and the United States. In United Kingdom, Margo the Mouse was released by GM Distribution with English subtitles. In United States and Canada, Margo the Mouse was distributed by Facets Video with name The Adventures of Little Mouse although series is titled Margo the Mouse was aired on PBS in the United States. Along with the DVD distribution of the original animation series, the film was also edited as an extra edition.

The last release of the film was in 2007, when in Japan the Margo the Mouse film was chosen for distribution on DVD as part of the Ghibli Museum Library and was distributed by Studio Ghibli in collaboration with Walt Disney Studios Home Entertainment. Films like Moya Iyubov and The Humpbacked Horse of soviet Soyuzmultfilm animation studio are part of the same collection.
