= Le Petit Cirque et autres contes =

Le Petit Cirque et autres contes (The Little Circus and Other Tales) is a 1994 French package film. It is 50 minutes long and contains the following seven short films for young children and their families from the Folimage studio:

1. Au clair de la lune, a stop motion animation by Pascal Le Nôtre
2. Le Petit Cirque de toutes les couleurs, a stop motion animation by Jacques-Rémy Girerd
3. Nos adieux au music-hall, a pastamation by Laurent Pouvaret
4. Le Prince des joyaux, a silhouette animation by Michel Ocelot
5. Le Wall, a clay animation by Jean-Loup Felicioli
6. Paroles en l'air, a traditional animation in charcoal by Sylvain Vincendeau
7. Le Moine et le poisson, a traditional animation in India ink by Michaël Dudok de Wit
