= Corrado Invernizzi =

Italian actor (born 1965)

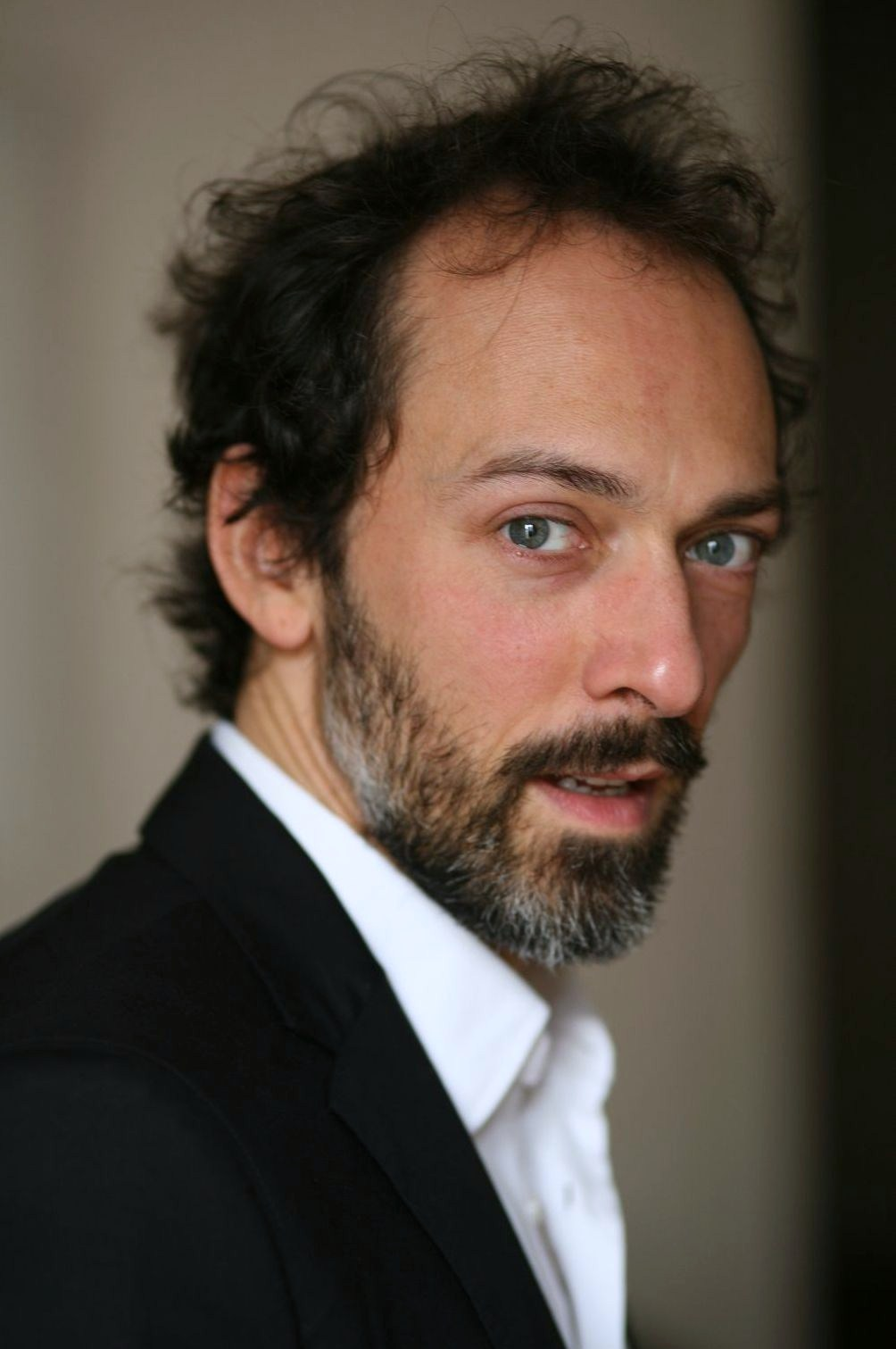
- Invernizzi in 2008
- Born: 25 April 1965 (age 61); Genoa, Italy
- Occupation: Actor

Corrado Invernizzi (born 25 April 1965) is an Italian actor.

== Biography ==
In movies, he appeared in Vincere as a psychiatrist and in Kidnapped as Judge Carboni (both directed by Marco Bellocchio). Both debuted at the Cannes Film Festival, followed by the New York Film Festival. He worked twice with James Mangold, in Ford v. Ferrari where he played Franco Gozzi (Enzo Ferrari's right hand) and in Indiana Jones and the Dial of Destiny where he was Luigi, the pilot who helps to save the archeologist and his team. He appeared in Piazza Fontana: The Italian Conspiracy directed by Marco Tullio Giordana as judge Pietro Calogero.

In theater, he appeared in The Coast of Utopia by Tom Stoppard also directed by Marco Tullio Giordana, in the role of literary critic Belinskij. The play received the Ubu Awards, the Le Maschere Awards and the Critic's Award in 2012. In 2010, he worked with the Beijing Opera under Patrick Sommier in the play Water Margin by Shi Nai'an.

In the new television series Marco Polo, released on 12 December 2014 and produced by Netflix, he plays Maffeo Polo, brother of Niccolò and Marco's uncle. In 2016, he was part of the cast of Genius, the first US television series produced by National Geographic. The series was created by Ron Howard and is based on the life of Albert Einstein. He played the role of French physicist Pierre Curie. The same year he also appeared as a protagonist in an episode of the British TV series Doctor Who, titled 'Extremis,' released on 20 May 2017 on BBC One. In 2018 he co-starred in The Name of the Rose, the drama series based on the international bestseller novel of the same name by Umberto Eco, where he plays the role of Michele of Cesena.

Invernizzi's career also includes voice-over work (or voice acting) with The Bears' Famous Invasion of Sicily directed by Lorenzo Mattotti that premiered at the Cannes Film Festival in 2019, where he played the role of the Grand Duke.

He is a tenor and studied opera singing at Conservatorio Giacomo Puccini in La Spezia.

== Filmography ==
=== Film ===
Year	Title	Role(s)	Notes
1997	Freshwater Man	Tenor singer	
1998	Shooting the Moon	Laboratory technician	Cameo appearance
2005	Guido che sfidò le Brigate Rosse	Workman	
2009	Vincere	Dr. Cappelletti	
2010	Requiem for a Killer	Vittorio Biamonte	
2011	Zabana!	Atlan	
2012	Piazza Fontana: The Italian Conspiracy	Judge Piero Calogero	
2013	The Unlikely Prince	Patient	
2014	The Silent Mountain	Nicola Quinziato	
2014	The Face of an Angel	Francesco	
2015	Né Giulietta né Romeo	Manuele Bordin	
2015	Long Live The Bride	Concellino	
2019	The Bears' Famous Invasion of Sicily	Grand Duke of Sicily	Voice role
2019	Ford v Ferrari	Franco Gozzi	
2019	Io sono Mia	Charles Aznavour	
2021	Caught by a Wave	Boris	
2021	The Catholic School	The Principal	
2023	Kidnapped	Judge Carboni	
2023	Indiana Jones and the Dial of Destiny	Luigi	
2023	Limonov: The Ballad	Lënja	
2024	Woken	Peter	

=== Television ===
Year	Title	Role(s)	Notes
1997	Doctor Giorgia	Cesare	Episode: "Martina"
1999, 2001	Inspector Montalbano	Lattes	2 episodes
2006	Mafiosa	Italian technician	Episode: "Épisode 5"
2007	Carabinieri	Oliviero Batti	Episode: "La pista sbagliata"
2007	Grand Star	Bodgan	3 episodes
2012	Les Fauves	Attorney Munez	Television film
2012	The Young Montalbano	Saverio Ostellino	Episode: "Sette lunedì"
2013	Braquo	Dr. Franco Belletti	Episode: "Nos funérailles"
2014	Marco Polo	Maffeo Polo	4 episodes
2017	Genius	Pierre Curie	Episode: "Einstein: Chapter Four"
2017	Doctor Who	Cardinal Angelo	Episode: "Extremis"
2019	The Name of the Rose	Michael of Cesena	Main role
2020	Romulus	Eulinos	3 episodes
2021	Leonardo	Piero Soderini	3 episodes
2024	Martin Scorsese Presents: The Saints	Caius	1 episode
2025	The Leopard †	Chevalley	Upcoming TV series
TBA	Assassin's Creed †	TBA	Upcoming TV series

== Theatre ==
- Six Characters in Search of an Author by Luigi Pirandello, directed by Giuseppe Patroni Griffi (1999)
- The Misanthrope by Molière, directed by Gabriele Lavia (2000)
- The Lost Years by Vitaliano Brancati, directed by Francis Aiqui (2000)
- Bar by Spiro Scimone, directed by Laurent Vacher (2004)
- Water Margin by Shi Nai'an, directed by Patrick Sommier (2010)
- The Coast of Utopia by Tom Stoppard, directed by Marco Tullio Giordana (2012)
- Bien Lotis by Philippe Malone, directed by Laurent Vacher (2013)
