= Rites, rivières, montagnes et châteaux =

2021 book by Lorenzo Mattotti

- Illustrator: Lorenzo Mattotti
- Publisher: Actes Sud BD
- Publication date: 7 April 2021
- Publication place: France
- Pages: 128
- ISBN: 978-2-330-14956-7

Rites, rivières, montagnes et châteaux (lit. 'Rites, Rivers, Mountains and Castles') is a 2021 collection of illustrations by the Italian painter and draughtsman Lorenzo Mattotti.

== Description ==
Lorenzo Mattotti was inspired to make Rites, rivières, montagnes et châteaux by his experiences with animation techniques while making the film The Bears' Famous Invasion of Sicily, released in 2019. The book contains illustrations with various techniques, sometimes depicting the same subjects in multiple ways and varying degrees of refinement.

== Reception ==
The French comic-book publisher Actes Sud BD published the book on 7 April 2021. Planète BD wrote that many themes from Mattotti's previous works recur, describing the pictures as "choreographed love rituals, buried daydreams, landscapes with a nature that captivates with its movements, ghostly scenes, and castles with architecture born from his imagination". Télérama wrote that Mattotti invites readers to think up stories by using motifs and colour combinations that produce "echoes of time immemorial" and "visual reminiscences of our collective memory". ActuaBD wrote that there are typical Mattotti elements such as wanderers, outcasts and architecture reminiscent of Giorgio de Chirico's paintings. The critic wrote that the pictures often are dreamlike and emanate "a unique poetry", and show how Mattotti constructs and develops his pictures through different techniques.
