= Tom Sweep =

- Screenshot
- Directed by: Michaël Dudok de Wit
- Written by: Michaël Dudok de Wit
- Produced by: Jill Thomas; Richard Purdum Productions
- Release date: 1992
- Running time: 3 minutes
- Country: France
- Language: no dialogue

Tom Sweep is an animated short film made by Michaël Dudok de Wit in 1992.

== About the film ==
The author, Michaël Dudok de Wit, said that "Tom Sweep" was intended to be one of a series of films. Unlike the two following films "The Monk and the Fish" (1994) and "Father and Daughter" (2000), it is structured around a single camera angle.
