= The Red Turtle =

2016 animated fantasy drama film

- French theatrical release poster
- Directed by: Michaël Dudok de Wit
- Written by: Michaël Dudok de Wit; Pascale Ferran
- Produced by: Toshio Suzuki; Isao Takahata; Vincent Maraval; Pascal Caucheteux; Grégoire Sorlat
- Edited by: Céline Kélépikis
- Music by: Laurent Perez del Mar
- Production companies: Studio Ghibli; Wild Bunch; Prima Linea Productions; Why Not Productions; Arte France Cinéma; CN4 Productions; Belvision
- Distributed by: Wild Bunch (France); Toho (Japan)
- Release dates: 18 May 2016 (Cannes); 29 June 2016 (France); 17 September 2016 (Japan)
- Running time: 80 minutes
- Countries: Japan; France
- Budget: €10 million
- Box office: $6.6 million

The Red Turtle (Note: French: La Tortue rouge; Japanese: レッドタートル ある島の物語, romanized: Reddo Tātoru: Aru Shima no Monogatari, lit. 'Red Turtle: A Tale of an Island') is a 2016 animated fantasy drama film directed by Michaël Dudok de Wit who co-wrote it with Pascale Ferran. The film is an international co-production between Japanese animation studio Studio Ghibli and several French companies, including Wild Bunch and Belvision. (Note: Produced with the support of Eurimages, La Région Poitou-Charentes, Le Département de la Charente (with Pôle Image Magelis and CNC), La Region Wallonne, Nippon Television Network, Dentsu, Hakudodo DY Media Partners, Walt Disney Japan, Mitsubishi Corporation, and Toho, with the participation of Canal+, Ciné+ and Arte France Cinéma, in association with Cinémage 9, Palatine Etoile 11, Palatine Etoile 12, and the BNP Paribas Fortis Film Fiance.) The film, which has no dialogue, tells the story of a man who becomes shipwrecked on an uninhabited island where his attempts at escape are repeatedly thwarted by a red turtle.

The film premiered in the Un Certain Regard section at the 69th Cannes Film Festival on 18 May 2016. The film was nominated for Best Animated Feature at the 89th Academy Awards.

== Plot ==
A man set adrift by a storm wakes up on a beach. He discovers that he is on an uninhabited island with plenty of fresh water, fruit, and a dense bamboo forest. It is dominated by a smooth rock hill. After a few nights he begins to hallucinate, seeing a bridge to lead him offshore and later a string quartet playing on the beach. He builds a raft from bamboo and attempts to sail away, but his raft is destroyed by an unseen creature in the sea, forcing him back to the island. He tries again with a larger raft, but is again foiled by the creature. A third attempt ends similarly, but this time he sees the creature: a giant red sea turtle.

That evening, the man sees the red turtle crawling up the beach. In anger, he hits it on the head with a bamboo stick, then flips it over onto its back, stranding it. While working on another raft, he feels remorse and returns to the turtle but it is too heavy for him to flip over. He fetches water for it, but when he returns, it is dead. He falls asleep next to it. In the morning, the man is surprised to find a red-haired woman lying unconscious inside the shell, which has split. He fetches water for her and builds a shelter to protect her from the sun. When rain hits, the woman wakes up and goes swimming. The woman casts the shell adrift on the sea and the man does the same to his raft. The two reconcile and fall in love.

The couple have a red-haired son. The curious boy finds a glass bottle and his father and mother tell him their story through pictographs. After accidentally falling into the sea, the boy learns he is a natural swimmer, and swims with some green sea turtles. He swims back to his mother, who hugs him and looks out at the sea with apprehension. The boy grows into a young man.

One day, a tsunami hits the island, destroying most of the bamboo forest and separating the family. After the tsunami recedes, the young man searches for his parents and finds his mother wounded with no sign of his father. He swims out to sea and is joined by three turtles. They find his father clinging to a large bamboo tree. Just as he slips under the water, they arrive and rescue him. The young man also finds his glass bottle, and the family clean up the wreckage and burn the dead bamboo.

A few years later, the young man has a dream about swimming away into the sea; the water becomes static, allowing him to swim to the top of a huge wave, from which he can see further over the horizon. Seeing this as his calling, he says goodbye to his parents in the morning and swims away with the three green turtles. The man and woman continue to live on the island and grow old together. One night, after gazing at the Moon, the man closes his eyes and dies. The woman grieves. She lies next to him, and lays her hand on his. As her hand transforms into a flipper and she transforms back into the red turtle, she crawls down the beach and swims away.

== Production ==
The film was co-produced by Wild Bunch and Studio Ghibli in association with Why Not Productions, along with funding and support from Prima Linea Productions, Arte France Cinéma, CN4 Productions, and Belvision in France, and Nippon Television Network, Dentsu, Hakudodo DY Media Partners, Walt Disney Japan, Mitsubishi Corporation, and Toho in Japan.

The film originated in 2008 when Wild Bunch co-founder Vincent Maraval visited the Japanese animation studio Studio Ghibli in Tokyo. Maraval met Ghibli co-founder Hayao Miyazaki who showed him Father and Daughter (2000), an animated short film written and directed by Dutch animator Michaël Dudok de Wit. Miyazaki told Maraval that if the studio was to ever produce a film with a foreign animator Dudok de Wit would be the one, and asked Maraval to locate him. The head of acquisitions at Wild Bunch tracked Dudok de Wit in London, where Maraval subsequently met him to discuss the possibility of producing an animated feature film. Dudok de Wit was uninterested at first, but changed his mind when he learned Miyazaki was interested to collaborate with him. The screenplay was written by Dudok de Wit and Pascale Ferran.

Dudok de Wit had originally intended for the animation to be done on paper, before scanning the drawings into a computer for digital coloring, but decided to use a graphics tablet instead after he did some tests on a Cintiq. The backgrounds were drawn with charcoal on paper and then scanned. Colors were then added in Photoshop, before light and shadow effects were composited into the scenes. Live action references for the scenes were shot, but nothing was rotoscoped. The live action footage was used only for references in what is called "analytic animation", where the actors' strongest poses are isolated by the animators. Both the raft and the turtle was created as CGI, and the turtle shell texture was created separately in Photoshop before being added. The animation team would retrace the linework of the CGI frame-by-frame, and manually draw the shadow effects, before all of it was laid over the CGI.

== Release ==
The film had its world premiere on 18 May at the 2016 Cannes Film Festival, where it competed in the Un Certain Regard section. On 13 June, it was screened as the opening film of the 2016 Annecy International Animated Film Festival. The regular French release was 29 June 2016.

It was released in Japan on 17 September 2016, by Toho. The movie was released on DVD and Blu-Ray by Walt Disney Japan through the Ghibli Ga Ippai label on March 17, 2017, with the Blu-Ray version also containing Michaël Dudok de Wit's other short films.

In May 2016, Sony Pictures Classics acquired the North and Latin American distribution rights for the film and was released in the United States on 20 January 2017.

The Red Turtle was played in the London Film Festival on 5 October 2016 and eventually released in the United Kingdom by StudioCanal on 26 May 2017. Wild Side Vidéo (through Warner Home Video) released the film on DVD and Blu-ray in France in 2017.

== Reception ==
=== Box office ===
In Japan it was released in theaters on 17 September and grossed a total of $328,750 during its first weekend.

=== Critical response ===
On the review aggregator website Rotten Tomatoes, 93% of 172 critics' reviews are positive. The website's consensus reads: "The Red Turtle adds to Studio Ghibli's estimable legacy with a beautifully animated effort whose deceptively simple story boasts narrative layers as richly absorbing as its lovely visuals." Metacritic, which uses a weighted average, assigned the film a score of 86 out of 100, based on 32 critics, indicating "universal acclaim".

=== Accolades ===
| Award | Date of ceremony | Category | Recipient(s) | Result | Ref(s) |
|---|---|---|---|---|---|
| Academy Awards | 26 February 2017 | Best Animated Feature | Michaël Dudok de Wit and Toshio Suzuki | Nominated | |
| Annie Awards | 4 February 2017 | Best Animated Feature – Independent | The Red Turtle | Won | |
| Annie Awards | 4 February 2017 | Outstanding Achievement, Animated Effects in an Animated Production | Mouloud Oussid | Nominated | |
| Annie Awards | 4 February 2017 | Outstanding Achievement, Directing in an Animated Feature Production | Michaël Dudok de Wit | Nominated | |
| Annie Awards | 4 February 2017 | Outstanding Achievement, Music in an Animated Feature Production | Laurent Perez del Mar | Nominated | |
| Annie Awards | 4 February 2017 | Outstanding Achievement, Writing in an Animated Feature Production | Michaël Dudok de Wit and Pascale Ferran | Nominated | |
| Cannes Film Festival | 21 May 2016 | Un Certain Regard Special Prize | Michaël Dudok de Wit | Won | |
| Cannes Film Festival | 21 May 2016 | Prize Un Certain Regard | Michaël Dudok de Wit | Nominated | |
| Cannes Film Festival | 21 May 2016 | Camera d'Or | Michaël Dudok de Wit | Nominated | |
| Chicago Film Critics Association | 15 December 2016 | Best Animated Film | The Red Turtle | Nominated | |
| Critics' Choice Awards | 11 December 2016 | Best Animated Feature | The Red Turtle | Nominated | |
| Los Angeles Film Critics Association | 4 December 2016 | Best Animated Film | The Red Turtle | Runner-up | |
| Magritte Award | 4 February 2017 | Best Foreign Film in Coproduction | The Red Turtle | Won | |
| Magritte Award | 4 February 2017 | Best Sound | Nils Fauth and Peter Soldan | Nominated | |
| Online Film Critics Society | 3 January 2017 | Best Animated Feature | The Red Turtle | Nominated | |
| San Francisco Film Critics Circle | 11 December 2016 | Best Animated Feature | The Red Turtle | Won | |
| Satellite Awards | 19 February 2017 | Best Animated or Mixed Media Feature | The Red Turtle | Nominated | |
| Toronto Film Critics Association | 11 December 2016 | Best Animated Film | The Red Turtle | Runner-up | |

== See also ==
- Selkie
- Song of the Sea (2014 film)
