= Jamie Richards (translator) =

American translator

Jamie Richards is an American translator of Italian literature.

== Biography ==
Jamie Richards is originally from the Los Angeles area and was educated at Scripps College in Claremont, California. She first studied translation under Lawrence Venuti at Temple University, Rome, completed an MFA in Literary Translation at the University of Iowa in 2004, and earned a PhD in Comparative Literature from the University of Oregon in 2014. She published her first short translations in Words Without Borders in 2005. She has been the recipient of several awards and fellowships, including the American Literary Translators Association Travel Fellowship in 2004, the Dalkey Archive Press Translation Fellowship in 2005, the National Endowment for the Arts Translation Fellowship in 2021, and the National Translation Award in Prose in 2024.

== Translations ==
- Claudia Durastanti, Missitalia (Fitzcarraldo Editions, Summit Books, 2027).
- Antonella Lattanzi, Things That Go Unspoken (Akoya Publishing, 2026).
- Attilio Micheluzzi, The Farewell Song of Marcel Labrume (Fantagraphics, 2024).
- Massimo Mattioli, Joe Galaxy, co-translated with Adrian Nathan West (Fantagraphics, 2024).
- Marosia Castaldi, The Hunger of Women (And Other Stories, 2023).
- Viola di Grado, Blue Hunger (Bloomsbury, Scribe, 2023).
- Guido Buzzelli, Collected Works (Floating World Comics, 2023).
- Roberto Saviano, I’m Still Here (Boom Studios, 2022).
- Ermanno Cavazzoni, Brief Lives of Idiots (Wakefield Press, 2020).
- Gipi, One Story (Fantagraphics, 2020).
- Lorenzo Mattotti and Jerry Kramsky, Garlandia (Fantagraphics, 2018).
- Igiaba Scego, Adua (New Vessel Press, 2017).
- Zerocalcare, Kobane Calling (Lion Forge, 2017).
- Manuele Fior, 5,000 km per Second (Fantagraphics, 2016).
- Igort, The Ukrainian & Russian Notebooks (Simon & Schuster, 2016).
- Giovanni Orelli, Walaschek’s Dream (Dalkey Archive Press, 2012).
- Viktor Shklovsky and Serena Vitale, Witness to an Era (Dalkey Archive Press, 2012).
