= Fires (comic book) =

1984 comic book by Lorenzo Mattotti

Fires (Fuochi)
- Date: 1988
- Page count: 68 pages
- Publisher: Dolce Vita

Creative team
- Writer: Lorenzo Mattotti
- Artist: Lorenzo Mattotti

Original publication
- Published in: alter alter
- Date of publication: 1984
- Language: Italian

Translation
- Publisher: Catalan Communications
- Date: 1988
- ISBN: 978-0-87416-048-2
- Translator: Tom Leighton

Fires (Italian: Fuochi) is a 1984 Italian comic book by Lorenzo Mattotti. It follows a young naval officer as he investigates an island which mysteriously is on fire and around which many vessels have disappeared, discovering that it is inhabited by supernatural beings.

Fires was published in the Italian comics magazine alter alter in 1984. It was first published as a book in French by Albin Michel in 1986 and in Italian by Dolce Vita in 1988. It was published in an English translation via French in 1988.

The book was very well received by critics and led Vanity Fair to hire Mattotti as its main illustrator. Publishers Weekly wrote that it "displays the artistry of European comics at their very best". The German edition received the 1992 Max und Moritz Award.
