= Dragons et Princesses =

- Genre: Fairy tale anthology series
- Written by: Michel Ocelot
- Directed by: Michel Ocelot
- Voices of: Yves Barsacq; Olivier Claverie; Michel Elias; Isabelle Guiard; Michel Ocelot
- Composer: Christian Maire
- Country of origin: France
- Original language: French
- No. of seasons: 1
- No. of episodes: 10

Production
- Producers: Christophe Rossignon; Michel Ocelot
- Editor: Patrick Ducruet
- Running time: 13 minutes
- Production companies: Nord-Ouest Films; Studio O Canal+

Original release
- Network: Canal+ Family
- Release: October 25 – November 5, 2010

Related
- Les Contes de la nuit (1992); Ciné si (1989)

Dragons et Princesses (French for "Dragons and Princesses") is a 2010 French computer animation television program written, storyboarded and directed by Michel Ocelot and produced at Studio O for Canal+. It is a fairy tale anthology series of ten further 13-minute episodes in the format established in Ciné si, though made in computer animation rendered in a silhouette instead of traditional silhouette animation made with backlit cut-outs. Five of the episodes are edited, with a feature-exclusive sixth, into the 2011 stereoscopic compilation movie Tales of the Night.

== Production ==
The series, which Ocelot also voice acted in, co-produced, art directed and designed, returns to the format of short silhouette animation fairy tales established by 1989's Ciné si and continued in 1992's Tales of the Night to produce further stories originally conceived for the then-unsuccessful Ciné si, episodes of which have since enjoyed popularity in the form of the compilation movie Princes and Princesses.

At least as early as September 2006, when Azur & Asmar: The Princes' Quest was previewing in France, Ocelot was mentioning in interviews that he was planning to return to silhouettes and the anthology format with a project then planned to be titled Bergères et Dragons ("Shepherdesses and dragons") and released in 2008 but wavered on whether it would it take the format of a feature film or television series and if it would consist of a combination of existing and new or all-new footage (the title suggests the inclusion of the "Bergère qui danse" segment of the earlier Tales of the Night). Instead, 2008 saw the inclusion of these earlier silhouette films in the Les Trésors cachés de Michel Ocelot short film collection and the new project, set back by production of several others, was announced in June 2010 as taking its eventual form of both a television series of ten new silhouette films and a new Tales of the Night for movie theaters drawn from it.

Dragons also notably sees him return to working with once-regular composer Christian Maire, who had last scored Ciné si for him two decades ago, and is the first production animated by his own Studio O in Paris, which previously had covered only pre-production for projects animated at larger animation studios. A total of over 300 characters and 800 sets were designed for the project, which was animated by a team of five in Autodesk Maya.

== Release ==
At least two of the episodes had pre-television premieres, with "L'Élue de la Ville d'or" ("The Electress of the City of Gold") screening at the Festival international de cinéma d'animation de Meknès in May 2010 and "Le Garçon qui ne mentait jamais" ("The Boy Who Never Lied") in competition for the Cristal for best TV production at the Annecy International Animation Film Festival in June, for which it lost to Studio Soi's Der Kleine und das Biest (The Little Boy and the Beast) but was instead given a special award for a television series. The series then began its run on the satellite and cable channel Canal+ Family with the first episode, "La Maîtresse des monstres" ("The Mistress of Monsters"), on October 25 at 20:25, being broadcast in the same time slot each weekday until all ten episodes had been aired, the last on November 5.

Two picture books drawn from two other episodes, "Le Loup-garou" ("The Werewolf") and "Ti Jean et la belle-sans-connaître" ("Ti Jean and the Beauty-That-Didn't-Know-It"), have been published and a DVD-Video of the series was released in France on November 30, 2010. It is region 2-locked and the only subtitles are French-language captions.
