= Ghibli Museum Library =

Collection of works by Studio Ghibli

The Ghibli Museum Library (三鷹の森ジブリ美術館ライブラリー, Mitaka no Mori Jiburi Bijutsukan Raiburarī; literally, Three Hawks (Mitaka) Forest Ghibli (Art) Museum Library) is the collection of non-Japanese animated films which have been dubbed or subtitled and released in Japan by Studio Ghibli under the Ghibli ga Ippai label, in collaboration with Walt Disney Studios Home Entertainment (with the partnership of Pony Canyon) and Cinema ANGELIKA. Three of the current titles were previously released as part of the now mostly defunct Ghibli Cinema Library (ジブリCINEMAライブラリー, Jiburi CINEMA Raiburarī). The collection is named after the Ghibli Museum in Mitaka.

== Films ==
- Le Roi et l'Oiseau (1980) – Cinema 2006.7.29, DVD 2007.4.4
- Kirikou et la Sorcière (1998) – DVD 2007.7.18
- Princes et Princesses (2000) – DVD 2007.7.18
- Les Triplettes de Belleville (2003) – DVD 2007.7.18
- Moya lyubov (2006) – Cinema 2007.3.17, DVD 2007.7.18
- Azur et Asmar (2006) – Cinema 2007.7.21, DVD and Blu-ray Disc 2007.12.19
- Przygody Myszki (1985) - DVD 2007.12.19
- Snezhnaya Koroleva (1957) – Cinema 2007.12.15, DVD 2008.7.2
- Panda Kopanda (1972–73) – Cinema 2008.3.15, DVD 2008.7.2
- Cheburashka (1969–83) – Cinema 2008.7.19, DVD 2008.11.21
- Animal Farm (1954) – Cinema 2008.12.20, DVD 2009.6.10
- Lupin Sansei 1st. TV series (1971–72) – Cinema (only) 2009.3.14
- A Matter of Loaf and Death (2008) – Cinema 2009.7.18, DVD and Blu-ray Disc 2009.11.27
- Mr. Bug Goes to Town (1941) – Cinema 2009.12.19, DVD 2010.4.21
- Konyok-Gorbunok (1947) and Seraya Sheyka (1948) – DVD (only) 2010.7.14
- Akage no Anne ~Green Gables no Michi~ – Cinema 2010.7.17, DVD and Blu-ray Disc 2010.11.17
- Shaun the Sheep series 1 (2007) – DVD and Blu-ray Disc (only) 2010.10.20 and 2010.11.17
- A Grand Day Out (1989), The Wrong Trousers (1993) and A Close Shave (1995) – DVD and Blu-ray Disc (only) 2010.10.20
- Shaun the Sheep series 2 (2009–2010) – DVD and Blu-ray Disc (only) 2011.1.19 and 2011.2.16
- L'Illusionniste (2010) – Cinema 2011.3.26, DVD and Blu-ray Disc 2011.10.8
- Tout-rien (1978), Crac (1981), L'Homme qui plantait des arbres (1987) and Le Fleuve aux grandes eaux (1993) – Cinema 2011.7.2, DVD 2011.7.20
- Les Contes de la nuit (2011) – Cinema 2012.6.30, DVD and Blu-ray Disc 2012.12.5
- Yoru no Tobari no Monogatari: Samenai Yume (夜のとばりの物語 －醒めない夢－) (2013) – Cinema 2013.1.19, DVD and Blu-ray Disc 2013.4.17
- Arrugas (2011) – Cinema 2013.6.22, DVD and Blu-ray Disc 2013.11.6
- Shaun the Sheep series 3 (2012–2013) – DVD and Blu-ray Disc (only) 2013.8.21
- Shaun the Sheep Movie – DVD, Blu-ray Disc and video on demand 2015.12.16
- Dilili à Paris – DVD, Blu-ray Disc and video on demand 2020.1.22 (following theatrical distribution by Child Film)
- Long Way North – DVD, Blu-ray Disc and video on demand 2020.12.2
- Shaun the Sheep: The Flight Before Christmas – DVD, Blu-ray Disc and video on demand 2020.2.15
- Le Pharaon, le Sauvage et la Princesse – DVD, Blu-ray Disc and video on demand 2023.12.6
