= The Aroma of Tea =

- Screenshot from The Aroma of Tea
- Directed by: Michaël Dudok de Wit
- Written by: Michaël Dudok de Wit
- Produced by: Willem Thijssen
- Release date: 2006
- Running time: 3:20 minutes
- Country: Netherlands
- Language: no dialogue

The Aroma of Tea is a 2006 Dutch animated short film written and directed by Michaël Dudok de Wit. It shows how a small sphere travels in a determined and rhythmical manner through land-scapes, emerging at the end into a larger sphere of white light. Both the graphic brushstroke and the music, with its haunting rhythms, are strikingly simple and direct. The theme of the film, a quest followed by a union, is as old as time and recognizable despite its limitless variations.
