= Alex Dudok de Wit =

British journalist and writer

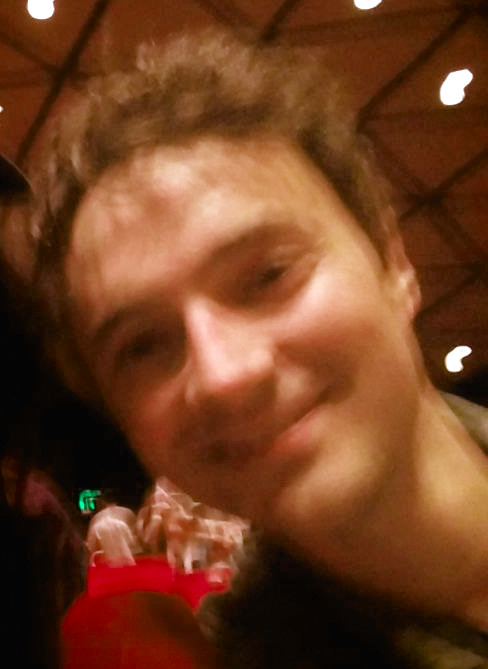
Dudok de Wit in 2022

Alex Dudok de Wit is a British journalist and writer.

== Biography ==
Dudok de Wit is the associate editor at the Cartoon Brew magazine, and has written for several other publications, including Sight and Sound, The Independent, and Time Out. He also works as a Japanese translator, and translated Hayao Miyazaki's manga Shuna's Journey (1983) into English in 2022. He is the son of the animation director Michaël Dudok de Wit.

Dudok de Wit published a book examining the film Grave of the Fireflies (1988), directed by Isao Takahata, through the British Film Institute in 2021. It is the first English-language reference work to focus on the film. He had started the project in 2018, when Takahata's death brought renewed attention to his filmography. Dudok de Wit was also inspired by a Japanese collection of materials on the film, as well as Andrew Osmond's reference work on Spirited Away (2001).

Anime News Network's Rebecca Silverman wrote that the work was "thoughtfully and engagingly written", and took a naturalist perspective on the film that recontextualised many other war stories by deemphasising their overtly emotional and tragic aspects. Sight and Sound's Michael Leader praised Dudok de Wit's "uncompromising attention to detail" and depth of research. Osmond, also writing for Anime News Network, said that the work analyses "a mentality that Japan was the 'victim' in World War II." Oliver Jia of the Asia Times wrote that the book was a "valuable service to Japanese animation studies", but felt that Dudok de Wit's conclusions lacked depth.

== Bibliography ==
- Dudok de Wit, Alex (2021). Grave of the Fireflies. British Film Institute. ISBN 978-1-83871-924-1.
