= Manuele Fior =

Italian cartoonist and illustrator (born 1975)

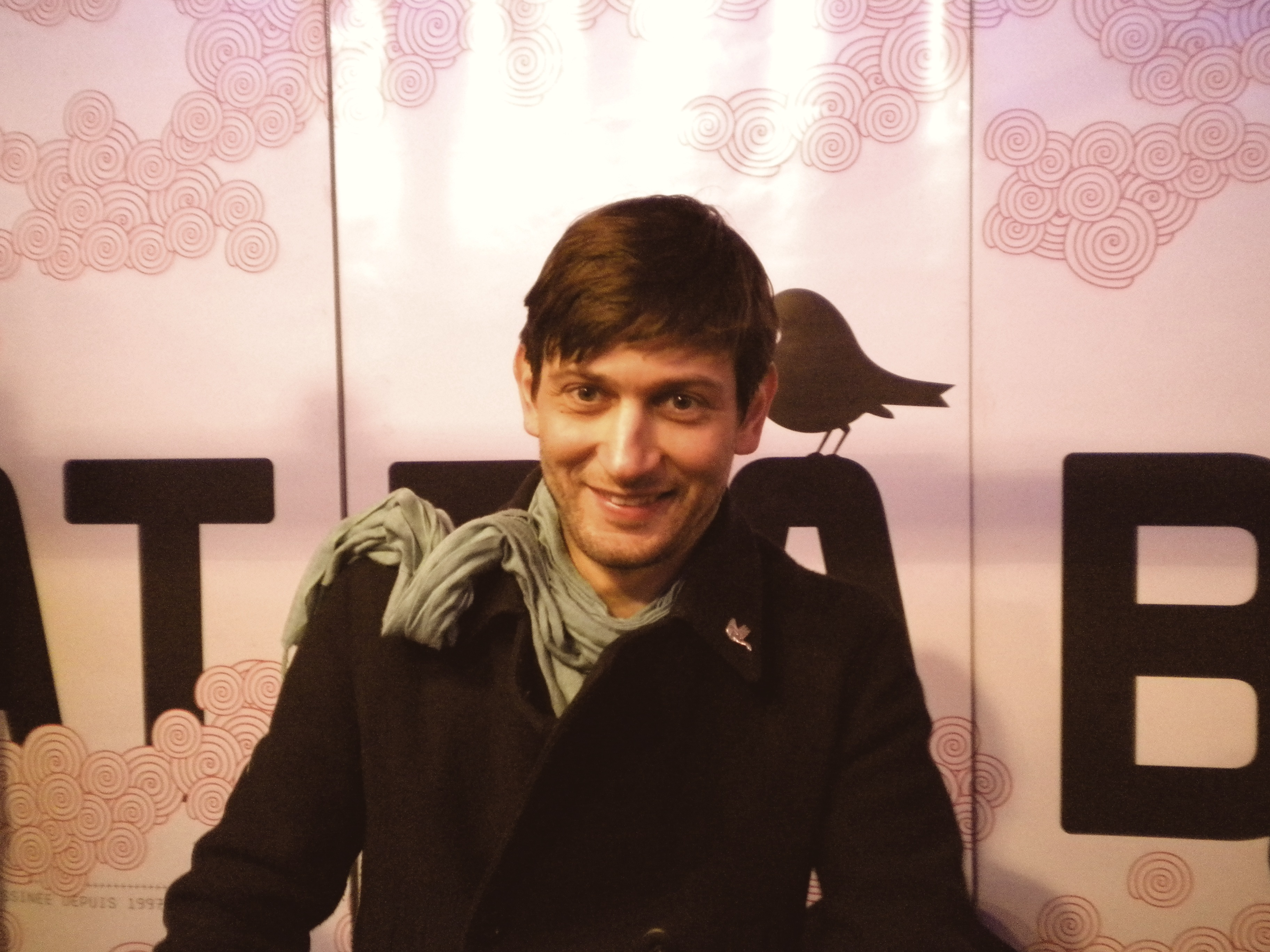
- Born: 1975 (age 50–51); Cesena, Italy
- Occupations: Comics artist, illustrator

Manuele Fior (born 1975) is an Italian comics author and illustrator.

== Biography ==
Manuele Fior was born in Cesena en 1975. He graduated in architecture at the IUAV University of Venice in 2000. He then moved to Berlin, where he worked as an architect and illustrator. In 2001, he published short stories in the magazine Plaque, published by Avant-Verlag. From that point on, he published numerous short stories—some written by his brother Daniele—in various magazines such as Black, Bile Noire, Stripburger, Forresten, and Osmosa. In 2005, he moved to Oslo, then to Paris, where he currently lives.

He illustrated an episode of the online series Les Autres Gens (written by Thomas Cadène) as well as the cover of the second volume of the collections published by Dupuis (2011).

In 2011, he won the Best Album Award at the Angoulême International Comics Festival for 5,000 Per Second.

In April 2013, his album Entrevue was released by Futuropolis, which had previously published some of the pages on its website. In early 2011, the author announced that he was working on this new project, this time in black and white, drawing graphic inspiration in particular from the work of American photographer Cindy Sherman.

"Les variations d'Orsay" was published in 2015, co-published by Futuropolis and the Musée d'Orsay Press. In it, Manuele Fior indulges in a reverie about the museum, featuring in particular works by Degas, Ingres, Pissarro, and the Impressionists

In 2020, he published Celestia with Atrabile. The book was shortlisted for the Grand Prix de la Critique 2021.

Hypericon was published in 2022 by Dargaud. In it, Fior tells the story of Teresa, an Italian student who arrives in Berlin in the late 1990s to work on an exhibition of Egyptian art and meets Ruben, an Italian punk living in a squat. This narrative is interwoven with the diary of Howard Carter, which Teresa reads, in which he recounts, among other things, his discovery of the Tomb of Tutankhamun. Fior lived in Berlin at the same time as his character and drew inspiration from his own experience for this graphic novel.

== Works ==
- 2004: Les gens le dimanche, Atrabile
- 2005: Quattro Buoni Motivi, written by Daniele Fior, Arti Grafiche Friulane
- 2006: Rosso oltremare, Coconino Press,
  - English version: Red Ultramarine. Translated by Jamie Richards. Fantagraphics, 2019
- 2009: La signorina Else, Coconino Press
- 2010: 5000 kilomètres par seconde, Atrabile Fauve d'or at the Festival d'Angoulême 2011
  - English edition:5,000 km Per Second. Translated by Jamie Richards. Fantagraphics, 2016
- 2013: L’Entrevue, Futuropolis
  - English edition:The Interview Translated by Jamie Richards. Fantagraphics, 2017
- 2015: Les variations d'Orsay, Futuropolis/Musée d'Orsay ISBN 978-2-7548-1409-6
- 2016: I Giorni della Merla, Coconino Press
  - English edition: Blackbird Days.Translated by Jamie Richards. Fantagraphics,2018.
- 2018: L'Heure des mirages, Ici même ISBN 9782369120421
- 2020: Celestia, Atrabile ISBN 978-2-8892-3091-4
  - English edition:Celestia. Translated by Jamie Richards. Fantagraphics 2021
- 2022: Hypericon, Dargaud ISBN 978-2-205-08981-3
  - English edition:Hypericum. Translated by Matt Madden. Fantagraphics, 2024
