= Garlandia =

2017 comic book by Lorenzo Mattotti and Jerry Kramsky

Garlandia (Ghirlanda)
- Page count: 392 pages
- Publisher: Logos Edizioni

Creative team
- Writer: Jerry Kramsky
- Artist: Lorenzo Mattotti

Original publication
- Date of publication: 13 March 2017
- Language: Italian
- ISBN: 9788857609003

Translation
- Publisher: Fantagraphics
- Date: 24 July 2018
- ISBN: 978-1-68396-097-3
- Translator: Jamie Richards

Garlandia (Italian: Ghirlanda) is a 2017 Italian comic book illustrated by Lorenzo Mattotti and written by Jerry Kramsky. A fantastical story in black-and-white, it is set in the pastoral land of Garlandia and especially follows the adventures of Hippolytes, the son of a shaman.

At almost 400 pages, the comic took 10 years to make and was published 15 years after Mattotti's and Kramsky's previous collaboration, Jekyll & Hyde. Garlandia was published in 2017 in Italian and French. The English translation by Jamie Richards was published in 2018.

Il Post wrote that the illustrations are reminiscent of Alley Oop and the Moomin comic strips. Publishers Weekly wrote that Garlandia focuses on its fictional world rather than characters. The critic praised the varied depictions of flowing landscapes and described the work as a "winding, dreamlike fantasy" with a "loose, stream-of-consciousness narrative".
