= The Bears' Famous Invasion of Sicily =

1945 Italian children's book

The Famous Bears Invasion of Sicily
- First edition
- Author: Dino Buzzati
- Original title: La famosa invasione degli orsi in Sicilia
- Translator: Frances Lobb
- Illustrator: Dino Buzzati
- Cover artist: Dino Buzzati
- Language: Italian
- Genre: Children's fiction
- Publisher: Rizzoli, Milano
- Publication date: 1945
- Publication place: Italy
- Media type: Print (hardback & paperback)
- ISBN: 0-06-072608-3 (2005 edition in English)
- OCLC: 55634012
- LC Class: PZ8.B965 Be 2005

The Bears' Famous Invasion of Sicily (Italian: La famosa invasione degli orsi in Sicilia) is a 1945 Italian children's book written and illustrated by Dino Buzzati. It tells the story of an armed conflict between the bears and humans of Sicily. It is written in novel format, with a great deal of poetry and illustrations as well.

== Synopsis ==
The book tells the story of a group of bears living in the mountains of Sicily under the command of King Leonzio. During a particularly harsh winter the bears find themselves without food, and then decide to invade the Grand Duchy of Sicily to survive; Leonzio also hopes to find his son Tonio, kidnapped by hunters a few years earlier.

The Grand Duke sends his army against the bears, whose inferiority is clear: the animals would be doomed if it were not for the intervention of their most valiant and strong warrior, the bear Babbone, who puts the enemy soldiers to flight by throwing huge snowballs at them. The bears feast in the enemy camp, where they meet Professor De Ambrosiis, the Grand Duke's sorcerer and ex-astrologer who he sacked for having predicted the fall of his kingdom. He possesses a magic wand, which can however be used only twice and which he retains to heal himself if he becomes ill; Professor De Ambrosiis, however, is forced to perform a spell to save the bears and himself from the attack of the boar army of the Sire of Molfetta, cousin and ally of the Grand Duke: this spell consists in causing the boars to swell until they then explode in the sky.

After several adventures, the bears reach the capital of the Grand Duchy, where they hope to find plenty of food. After a first day of unsuccessful fighting, the animals have the upper hand thanks to the ingenious inventions of the Frangipane bear, which allow them to enter the city. Leonzio and some of his followers break into the Excelsior theater, where the Grand Duke, kept by his collaborators unaware of the real situation, is witnessing the final show of the evening: Tonio, forced to perform as an acrobat. Leonzio immediately recognizes his son and rushes towards him, but the Grand Duke shoots the teddy bear wounding him mortally. Leonzio's companions kill the Grand Duke, while Professor De Ambrosiis, though with extreme reluctance, uses the second and final spell of his magic wand to heal Tonio. Thus began the reign of Leonzio on the city, in the name of peaceful coexistence between bears and men.

Over the years, however, the bears begin to corrupt, assuming human habits such as wearing clothes and drinking. The chamberlain, the Salnitro bear, is at the center of this process: distracting Leonzio's attention with the construction of a monument in his honor, Salnitro opens a gambling den (in which Leonzio surprises his son Tonio) and organizes wild parties in a hidden palace, then stealing from Professor De Ambrosiis a second magic wand that he had built for himself. The chamberlain, in his thirst for power, comes to mortally wound Leonzio when he, along with his faithful, goes out to sea to fight a terrible sea snake that threatens the city; But Salnitro is immediately killed by the bear Jasmine, the only one to have noticed his machinations.

On his deathbed King Leonzio asks the bears to leave the city and the riches that have corrupted them and to return to the mountains, where they will find peace of mind; animals respect his will, abandoning men forever.

== Publication ==
The book was published by Rizzoli in 1945. It was translated into English in 1947 by Frances Lobb. In 2003, a new American hardcover edition was published in the New York Review Children's Collection, followed by a paperback edition in 2005 by HarperCollins. In the HarperCollins edition, Lemony Snicket has written a Reader's Companion that sums up each chapter, provides some interesting questions for the reader to think about, and an interesting activity to go along with each chapter.

== Reception ==
Publishers Weekly wrote in 2004: "Buzzati's drawings retain a fun, retro-European feel, while his occasional full-color illustrations emphasize the town's red rooftops and celebrated architecture." Kirkus Reviews wrote that the book "will appeal perhaps as much to the adult who shares it with a child of ten and up, as to the child, who may read it simply as a fantasy." The critic further wrote that "the opera-comique effect, the substantial plot, the humorous drawings—and full pages in color—by the author, make it appealing to a selective audience."

== Film adaptation ==
The book has been adapted into the French-Italian animated film The Bears' Famous Invasion of Sicily, directed by Lorenzo Mattotti, which premiered in 2019.
