= Caught by a Wave =

2021 Italian film

- Film poster
- Italian: Sulla Stessa Onda
- Directed by: Massimiliano Camaiti
- Written by: Claudia Bottino; Massimiliano Camaiti
- Starring: Elvira Camarrone; Christian Roberto; Donatella Finocchiaro
- Production company: Cinemaundici
- Release date: 25 March 2021
- Running time: 99 minutes
- Country: Italy
- Language: Italian

Caught by a Wave (Italian: Sulla Stessa Onda) is a 2021 coming-of-age romance film directed by Massimiliano Camaiti, based on a screenplay written by Camaiti and Claudia Bottino. Produced by the Italian company Cinemaundici, the film stars Elvira Camarrone and Roberto Christian as two high school students who fall in love after meeting at a regatta-oriented summer camp on Sicily, though their romance is soon complicated when Camarrone's character, Sara, is diagnosed with muscular dystrophy. The film was released on Netflix on March 25, 2021.

Originally produced in Italian, the film features Donatella Finocchiaro, Corrado Invernizzi, and Vincenzo Amato, and features the voices of Anne Yatco and Josh Zuckerman in the English dub.

== Plot ==
Two high school students, Sara (16 years old) and Lorenzo (17 years old) meet in a summer camp and fall in love with each other. During a sailing session, Sara develops numbness in her muscles, a degenerative disease she is suffering from. Sara hides her illness from Lorenzo but the truth finally finds its way into their relationship. The story follows the struggle of the couple as they try to deal with the pain and keep their love sparkling.

== Cast ==
- Elvira Camarrone as Sara
- Christian Roberto as Lorenzo
- Donatella Finocchiaro as Susanna
- Corrado Invernizzi as Boris
- Vincenzo Amato as Antonio
- Manuela Ventura as Tuccia
- Rosalba Battaglia as Doctor
- Daniele Pilli as Mario
- Sofia Migliara as Barbara
- Fabio Orso as Francesco
- Angelica Alleruzzo as Marta
- Giovanni D'Aleo as Gianluca
- Giuseppe Severino as Andrea
- Marta Paris as Caterina
- Marco Feo as Ernesto
- Luciano Saladino as Club Director
- Marta Fullone as Lorenzo's Mother
- Mattia Monien as Lorenzo's Grandmother
- Simona Taormina as ISAF Technical Delegates
- Maurizio Cecconi as ISAF Technical Delegates
