= The Bears' Famous Invasion of Sicily (film) =

- Italian theatrical release poster
- Directed by: Lorenzo Mattotti
- Screenplay by: Jean-Luc Fromental; Thomas Bidegain; Lorenzo Mattotti
- Based on: The Bears' Famous Invasion of Sicily by Dino Buzzati
- Produced by: Valérie Schermann; Christophe Jankovic
- Starring: Toni Servillo; Antonio Albanese; Corrado Guzzanti; Linda Caridi; Maurizio Lombardi; Corrado Invernizzi; Alberto Boubakar Malanchino; Beppe Chierici; Roberto Ciufoli; Nicola Rignanese
- Edited by: Nassim Gordji Tehrani; Sophie Reine
- Music by: René Aubry
- Production company: Prima Linea Productions
- Distributed by: BIM Distribuzione (Italy); Pathé (France)
- Release dates: 21 May 2019 (Cannes); 9 October 2019 (France); 7 November 2019 (Italy)
- Running time: 82 minutes
- Countries: Italy; France
- Languages: Italian; French
- Budget: €11 million
- Box office: $2.2 million

The Bears' Famous Invasion of Sicily, also known as The Bears and the Invasion of Sicily in the United States (Italian: La famosa invasione degli orsi in Sicilia; French: La Fameuse Invasion des ours en Sicile), is a 2019 animated adventure film directed by Lorenzo Mattotti. The screenplay by Mattotti, Jean-Luc Fromental and Thomas Bidegain is based on the 1945 Italian children's book The Bears' Famous Invasion of Sicily by Dino Buzzati.

The film was selected to be screened in the Un Certain Regard section at the 2019 Cannes Film Festival. Pathé distributed the film in France on 9 October 2019 and by BIM Distribuzione in Italy on 7 November 2019. It received critical acclaim.

== Plot ==
While resting in a cave, Almerina and Gedeone are caught by an old bear sleeping in the same cave. To cheer the bear up, Gedeone tells the bear the story of the bears' famous invasion of Sicily.

Leoncio and Tonio are in the river, Tonio is being taught how to catch a fish when he is suddenly taken away by the river. This leads Leoncio to enter a depression, and soon his bear clan is starving. Leonzio suggests that Tonio is among the people in Sicily, and such Leoncio leads the bears to Sicily. The bears soon get attacked by the Sicilian army, though it does not take long for them to retreat. Leoncio befriends the human magician.

== Cast ==
Character	Italian voice actor	French voice actor
Almerina	Linda Caridi	Leïla Bekhti
Gedeone	Antonio Albanese	Thomas Bidegain
Old Bear	Andrea Camilleri	Jean-Claude Carrière
Bear Babbon	Roberto Ciufoli	Boris Rehlinger
Grand Duke of Sicily	Corrado Invernizzi	Pascal Demolon
Leonzio	Toni Servillo	Thierry Hancisse
Salpetre	Corrado Guzzanti	Jacky Nercessian
Tonio	Alberto Boubakar Malanchino	Arthur Dupont

== Production ==
The film was produced by the French company Prima Linea Productions. It is co-produced with Pathé and France 3 Cinéma in France and Indigo Film and Rai Cinema in Italy. It has a budget of €11 million. It received financial support from Canal+ and the CNC. It received 375,000 euros from the Ile-de-France region's Support Fund for Film and Audiovisual Technical Industries. The project also won the Gan Foundation's Special Prize for 2016.

The visual style is inspired by Buzzati's illustrations but also independent from the original book. The landscapes are inspired by real Mediterranean landscapes with liberties taken in order to create a fairytale-like atmosphere. Mattotti's ambition was to create a timeless visual style so that people who view the film in the future will not be able to see when it was made.

The film was in production in November 2016. In a November 2016 interview, Mattotti expected it to be released in two or three years.

== Reception ==
=== Critical response ===
On review aggregator website Rotten Tomatoes, the film holds an approval rating of 100% based on 16 reviews. Oneofus.net called the movie an "charming experience" and "refreshingly different" giving the adults a strong recommendation to take children see it.
