= Fear(s) of the Dark =

- Theatrical release poster
- Directed by: Christian "Blutch" Hincker; Charles Burns; Marie Caillou; Pierre di Sciullo; Lorenzo Mattotti; Richard McGuire
- Written by: Jerry Kramsky; Michel Pirus; Romain Slocombe; Christian "Blutch" Hincker; Charles Burns; Pierre di Sciullo
- Produced by: Valérie Schermann; Christophe Jankovic
- Starring: Aure Atika; Guillaume Depardieu; Louisa Pili; François Creton; Christian Hecq; Arthur H
- Narrated by: Nicole Garcia
- Distributed by: Diaphana Films
- Release dates: 21 October 2007 (Rome Film Festival); 13 February 2008 (France)
- Running time: 85 minutes
- Country: France
- Language: French

Fear(s) of the Dark (French: Peur(s) du noir) is a 2007 French black-and-white animated horror anthology film on the subject of fear produced by Prima Linéa Productions and written and directed by several notable comic book creators and graphic designers. It was premiered at the 2007 Roma Film Festival and released in France in February 2008.

== Plot ==
Throughout the film are a series of two-dimensional computer-animated intervals written, designed and directed by Pierre di Sciullo.

- In these intervals, the disembodied voice of a woman is heard; she expresses her fears through a monologue, making confessions from trivial anxiety, grotesque nightmares, to crippling sadness. These extend into the credits where the last thing the woman states that she is afraid of is being nice to people. She asks how life has been and gets a response from a male voice who simply utters "nice".

The first story is a traditional animation written, designed and directed by Christian "Blutch" Hincker.

- A sinister, sadistic old marquis and his four vicious dogs, whom he restrains on leashes, trek through the countryside; one-by-one, the marquis sets and releases each dog on a victim. The first dog is unleashed on a small young boy with black soulless eyes, the second on a constructionist while his fellow workers watch in terror, and the third is released on a dancing woman (who is also given cunnilingus by the same dog). The marquis then begins dancing gleefully and happily at his misdeeds, but fails to notice his fourth dog, who after staring at its reflection in a mirror suddenly turns on its own master and disembowels him.

The second story is a three-dimensional computer animation written, designed and directed by Charles Burns.

- An elderly obese-looking man named Eric awakens from his sleep to prepare for his "medication" and recounts a story in his youth. In the flashback as an intelligent introvert with a passion for entomology, Eric discovers and captures a mysterious humanoid beetle; it escapes, and yet the boy seems haunted by it. Once he begins attending college, Eric becomes infatuated with a female classmate named Laura. He invites her to his house one night, and they end up sleeping together. The next morning, Laura awakens with a deep gash in her arm, but she seems composed and nonchalant about it. Nevertheless, Eric bandages her arm. Laura soon becomes obsessed with cooking food, having sex with Eric, and begins acting more dominant. When Eric returns from class, he discovers that Laura had cut her hair short, dressed in more masculine clothes, and reveals that her gash has produced a small limb resembling the beetle's. He is rendered unconscious from a drink that Laura poured and wakes to find that he is tied up and now has a small gash on his hand. Laura arrives and removes a small egg from it. Back in the present it is now revealed that Eric is now covered with gashes and appears to have been mutated into an egg carrier of sorts. Laura arrives with a group of larger people-sized beetles (presumed to be her offspring) that enter the room and serve him food. Eric states that he wishes Laura still loved him or "at least pretended to".

The third story is a two-dimensional computer animation written by Romain Slocombe and designed and directed by Marie Caillou.

- The story begins with police investigating a murder. Ayakawa Sumako is a meek girl who is receiving clinical treatment for her nightmares, her doctor being a scientist who continues to sedate her to experience them again. She begins attending school in rural Japan where the students begin brutally picking on and torturing her due to being a newcomer and for living in an ancient house near a cemetery where a samurai named Hajime is buried. Sumako tries walking home through the woods, but comes across Hajime's burial site. As she tries to leave, she is accosted by a Chōchin-obake, a Kasa-obake, a Rokurokubi and various yōkai and other entities resembling her classmates. When she comes to, she is clearly possessed by the spirit of Hajime. She returns home, picks up a knife and presumably murders her family. As Sumako awakens, the scientist asks her if she saw the end of her dream. When she answers in the negative, the scientist tells her that she needs to see it to the end in order for her to be "cured". In response, Sumako breaks down into tears.

The fourth story is a traditional animation written by Jerry Kramsky and designed and directed by Lorenzo Mattotti.

- An unnamed man recounts his time as a young boy living in rural France. Having lost his uncle in a poaching trip, the boy confides in his friend, a mysterious orphan, who claims that the uncle could have been "mauled" by a beast from the sky. The friend disappears and a searching party is sent out to look for him. The boy encounters an inhumanly-breathing creature of some kind and becomes convinced that the beast and his friend are somehow one entity and the same. Later on, a professional ranger is hired to hunt down the alleged beast. He sets a trap and kills and captures a giant crocodile that is displayed in their local church. The town is convinced that this was the beast as people have stopped disappearing. One night, the boy awakens in the middle of the night to see a shadowy figure peaking through his window before disappearing. As he looks out the window, he sees a tailed figure hopping away into the distance, seemingly confirming the boy's hypothesis. Back in the present, as he checks on the crocodile hanging in the church, he laments that he never saw his friend again and wonders what other secrets he has kept from him.

The fifth story is written by Richard McGuire and Michel Pirus and designed and directed by McGuire.

- A burly mustached man breaks into a seemingly abandoned mansion to escape a blizzard. He uncovers a photo album of a woman, possibly the mistress of the house, who apparently tried living a normal life after her parents' passing. Due to unexplained circumstances, she began pushing away people by cutting their heads and faces out of their photos in the album. The man falls asleep and has a nightmare that the mistress comes and slices his head off. He angrily tosses the album into the fire, but the pages fly out and he has to put them out resulting in his foot going through the floorboards and him losing a shoe. He decides to venture upstairs where the mistress' spirit seems to follow him. He comes to a closet with shoes and as he tries to put one on as a replacement, the closet door suddenly closes behind him. He discovers a hatbox with an emaciated head inside and panics. He finally manages to break a small hole to the outside and tries to get the attention of two children playing, but he only succeeds in scaring them away, leaving him trapped and haunted.

== Cast ==
- Wraparound
  - Nicole Garcia as Le Femme (The Woman)
- 1st segment
  - Christian Hincker as L'homme Aux Chiens (The Man with the Dogs)
  - Lino Hincker as L'enfant (The Child)
- 2nd segment
  - Guillaume Depardieu as Eric
  - Aure Atika as Laura
  - Brigitte Sy as Mere de Eric (Eric's Mother)
  - Sarah-Laure Estragnat as Fille 1 (Girl #1)
  - Amélie Lerma as Fille 2 (Girl #2)
  - Gil Alma as L'acteur Cinema (Movie Actor)
  - Charlotte Vermeil as L'actrice Cinema (Movie Actress)
- 3rd segment
  - Louisa Pili as Ayakawa Sumako
  - Amaury Smets as Michio
  - Melaura Honnay as Rieko
  - Adriana Piasek-Wanski as Tomoko
  - Christian Hecq as Le Samourai / Le Docteur (The Samurai "Hajime" / The Doctor)
  - François Creton as L'instituteur (The Teacher)
  - Florence Maury as Mere de Sumako / 6 Yeux (Sumako's Mother / 6 Eyes)
- 4th segment
  - Arthur H as La Narrateur (The Narrator)
- 5th segment
  - Laurent Van den Rest as L'homme (The Man)
  - Nicolas Feroumont as Enfant (Child)
  - Andreas Vuillet as Enfant (Child)
