= Tales of the Night (TV special) =

1992 film directed by Michel Ocelot

- Still from the segment "Le Prince des joyaux."
- Created by: Michel Ocelot
- Written by: Michel Ocelot
- Directed by: Michel Ocelot
- Starring: Sophie Edmond; Cyrille Artaux; Eric Bottom; Philippe Destre; Pierre Jarillon; Patrice Leroy
- Theme music composer: Alain Marchal
- Country of origin: France
- Original language: French

Production
- Producer: Didier Brunner
- Editor: Michèle Péju
- Running time: 26 minutes

Original release
- Network: Canal+
- Release: 1992

Related
- Ciné si (1989); Dragons et Princesses (2010)

Tales of the Night (French: Les Contes de la nuit) is a 1992 French silhouette animation television special written and directed by Michel Ocelot. It aired on Canal+ in France, ZDF in Germany and Channel 4 in the United Kingdom. It is a trilogy of three further fairy tales in much the same format as Ciné si.

== Plot ==
A boy, a girl and an old technician get together in an abandoned cinema to invent stories, the boy and the girl play after then made costumes. The three stories are "La Belle Fille et le sorcier" ("The Pretty Girl and the Sorcerer"), "Bergère qui danse" ("The Dancing Shepherdess") and "Le Prince des joyaux" ("The Prince of Jewels"). Unlike La Princesse insensible and Ciné si, Tales of the Night is on 35mm film.

== Release ==
"Le Prince des joyaux" was also shown in French cinemas in 1994 (and later released on VHS) as part of the Folimage-organised package film Le Petit Cirque et autres contes. All three individual segments (though still lacking the original opening, ending and bridging segments) were made available on DVD-Video with the release of Les Trésors cachés de Michel Ocelot in 2008.
