= Marie Caillou =

French graphic artist

Marie Caillou (born 1971) is a French graphic artist who works on illustration, comic books and animated films.

She was born in Montbéliard and studied at the École supérieure des arts décoratifs de Strasbourg. Marie went on to study cartoon design in Brussels and began working with digital graphics. She now lives in Paris.

She has a large cult following in Japan.

== Selected work ==
=== Graphic novels ===
- Les monstres de Mayuko (2012)
- La ligne droite (2013)
- Adrian and the Tree of Secrets (2014) by Hubert and Caillou

=== Children's literature ===
- Le Chat botté
- Ali Baba (2013)
- Boucle d'Or et les trois ours (2013)
- Kongjwi, l'autre Cendrillon (2013)

=== Animated films ===
- Marika et le loup (2003)
- Peur(s) du noir (2007), English title Fear(s) of the Dark
