= The Monk and the Fish =

- Screenshot
- Directed by: Michaël Dudok de Wit
- Written by: Michaël Dudok de Wit
- Produced by: Patrick Eveno; Jacques-Remy Girerd
- Edited by: Hervé Guichard
- Music by: Serge Besset
- Release date: 1994
- Running time: 6 minutes 20 seconds
- Country: France
- Language: No dialogue

The Monk and the Fish (French: Le Moine et le poisson) is a 1994 animated short film made by Michaël Dudok de Wit at the studio Folimage.

== Plot ==
Standing next to a water reservoir in a monastery enclave, a monk sees a fish and goes to get his net to catch it. The fish eludes him and the monk gets rather agitated as he tries increasingly extreme ways of catching the fish. He gets into the pond himself, and enlists the help of other monks; he tries candles, and a bow and arrow to no avail. The more the fish manages to evade him, the more obsessed the monk gets. He follows the fish out of the pond into a canal, through different landscapes and out of the confines of the monastery. Eventually the chase gets less frantic and the monk and the fish move in harmony. They float through a door into the open space and drift off into the sky together.

== Production ==
The film was made using a traditional animation technique; Nowadays, hand-drawn animation is often assisted by computers with digital ink and paint or an graphics tablet, but this has been made in the traditional way using brush, Indian ink, and watercolour.

The specially created music score, by Serge Besset, is based on La Follia by Arcangelo Corelli.

== Reception ==
It was nominated for the Academy Award for Best Animated Short Film at the 67th Academy Awards and Best Short Animated Film at the 48th British Academy Film Awards. It was also one of seven short subjects shown in French cinemas and released on VHS as part of the package film Le Petit Cirque et autres contes. It was also included in the Animation Show of Shows.
