= Ciné si =

1989 French television series

- Title card
- Also known as: Cinema If (literal translation); We Are the Star (marketed as)
- Created by: Michel Ocelot
- Written by: Michel Ocelot
- Directed by: Michel Ocelot
- Voices of: Arlette Mirapeu; Philippe Cheytion; Yves Barsacq; François Voisin
- Composer: Christian Maire
- Country of origin: France
- Original language: French
- No. of seasons: 1
- No. of episodes: 8

Production
- Editor: Michèle Péju
- Camera setup: Single-camera setup
- Running time: 12 minutes
- Production companies: La Fabrique; Salud Productions

Original release
- Network: Canal+
- Release: 3 April 1989

Related
- Tales of the Night (1992); Princes et Princesses (2000); Dragons et Princesses (2010); Tales of the Night (2011)

Ciné si (French: [sineˈsi] Cinema If) is a 1989 French silhouette animation television series conceived, written and directed by Michel Ocelot and realised at La Fabrique, consisting of short fairy tale and retrofuture stories performed by the same animated "actors". A critical success but commercial failure at the time, no further episodes were commissioned beyond the initial eight but following the success of Ocelot's Kirikou and the Sorceress six were edited into the 2000 compilation movie Princes et Princesses (Princes and Princesses), in which form they finally saw wide exposure and acclaim both in France and internationally; a further episode was included in a home release of short works in 2008 but one remains unavailable for public consumption.

It is the first of Ocelot's projects to be filmed entirely in silhouette, an aesthetic he has since become particularly associated with, continuing in it and the "actor" conceit with 1992's Tales of the Night and conceiving Kirikou and the Sorceress as such, returning to it fully with the continuation of Ciné si he had always planned for in the form of Dragons et Princesses.

== Episodes ==
Two episodes of Ciné si were not compiled into Princes et princesses: "Icare" and "On ne saurait penser à tout". "Icare" was later included, with English subtitles on the French DVD release Les Trésors cachés de Michel Ocelot.

=== La Princesse des diamants ===
It is said that somewhere, an enchanted princess lies captive in a secret palace – a palace one can be sure that they're getting close to if they find diamonds lying in the grass. But in order to free the princess from the curse placed upon her, one would have to find all one-hundred and eleven of the diamonds which make up her broken necklace. Many princes have attempted to break the spell, but all have disappeared without a trace. An original story by Michel Ocelot; nominated for the César Award for best short animated film in 1989.

=== Le Garçon des figues ===
In the age of the Pharaohs, an honest young man is gifted a magical fig tree which sprouts fruit in the middle of winter. In honour of this miracle, he endeavours to present the figs to the queen of Egypt. However, a malicious royal steward would rather have it otherwise. Based on an ancient Egyptian tale.

=== La Sorcière ===
In northern Europe during the Middle Ages, a medieval king promises his daughter's hand in marriage to any man that can infiltrate the fortress of an evil sorceress, guarded by all manner of mechanical monsters. Is it possible that a simple unarmed boy can succeed where knights and princes have failed? An original story by Michel Ocelot.

=== Le Manteau de la vieille dame ===
In Japan during the time of Hokusai (the early 19th century to be exact) an adorable old poet-woman is travelling home when a devious bandit catches sight of her beautiful, expensive coat, and devises a plan to take it from her before the night is up. But unknown to him, she has a few of her own tricks up the sleeves of that beautiful coat. Won the Annecy International Animated Film Festival award for best TV series episode in 1991.

=== La Reine cruelle et le montreur de fabulo ===
In the year 3000 lives a pitiless queen who seeks out and kills all her would-be suitors with the powers of her mega radar and disintegrator ray. That is, until the trainer of a strange whistling creature takes up the challenge of evading the radar. Could it be that queen is not really cruel, and that her anger only stems from her loneliness? An original story by Michel Ocelot.

=== Prince et princesse ===
Within the sumptuous elegance of a French rococo garden, a young prince and princess, after some cajoling from the prince, swear their love for each other with a kiss – a kiss which turns out to have some side?effects which are more than just a little unexpected.

An original story by Michel Ocelot. Won the Ottawa International Animation Festival award for best TV series episode in 1990.

=== Icare ===
A retelling of the familiar mythological story of Icarus and Daedalus.

=== On ne saurait penser à tout ===
The title translates as "One Could Not Think of All".

== Production ==
The series was produced across two years starting in 1987, with animation done at La Fabrique in Saint-Laurent-le-Minier during the summer and post-production done in Paris during the intervening winters. It premiered at animation festivals in 1989, receiving critical acclaim and awards for best anthology series at Annecy and best children's series at Ottawa but no commission to create further episodes.

== Themes ==
Ciné si takes the format of an anthology series of fairy tales in which the male and female leads are always portrayed by the same animated "actors," the supporting cast being supposedly played by humanoid robots programmed by them. Each story is preceded by a prologue set in a disused movie theater, in which these actor-animators and an old man who is both the projectionist and theater organist think up the story, costumes and music for the play which they then perform. These short plays stretch the definition of fairy tales, some being set in specified countries, most having post-modern, trick endings and one set not at an unspecified point in the past but, instead, in the future, with a retro-futurist aesthetic in the style of Yakov Protazanov's Aelita. All have an obvious – though never explicitly stated – moral, in the style of traditional stories.

Ocelot had many more ideas for stories in this format, but the series was not as successful as he had expected and no further episodes than the initial eight were commissioned. A few years later, three of these stories were made into the TV special Tales of the Night (Les Contes de la nuit in French); in 2008 he returned to direct another ten of them as another television series, Bergères et dragons (Shepherdesses and Dragons), this time using computer animation to imitate the silhouette animation of Ciné si and Les Contes de la nuit.
