= Michaël Dudok de Wit =

Dutch animator, director and illustrator

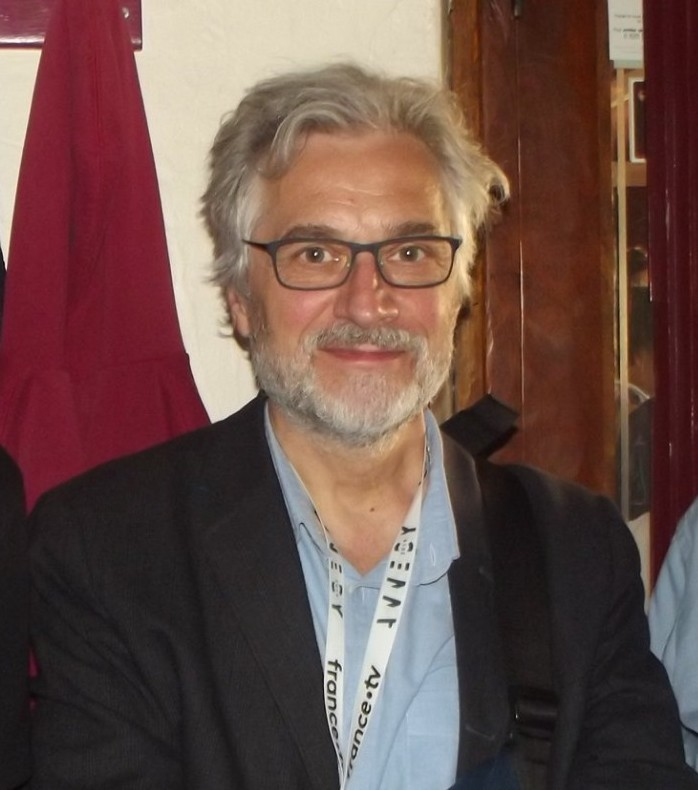
- Dudok de Wit at the 2019 Annecy International Animated Film Festival
- Born: 15 July 1953 (age 73); Abcoude, Netherlands
- Education: West Surrey College of Art
- Occupations: Animator, film director, illustrator
- Notable work: The Monk and the Fish; Father and Daughter; The Red Turtle
- Children: Alex Dudok de Wit

Michaël Dudok de Wit (Dutch pronunciation: [ˈmixaːɛl ˈdydɔɡ də ˈʋɪt]; born 15 July 1953) is a Dutch animator, director and illustrator based in London. He won an Academy Award for Best Animated Short Film for Father and Daughter (2000) and was nominated in the same category for The Monk and the Fish (1994) as well as for an Academy Award for Best Animated Feature for The Red Turtle (2016).

== Early life and education ==
Michaël Dudok de Wit was born in Abcoude in the Netherlands. After his high school education in the Netherlands, he attended the Geneva School of Fine Arts. In 1978, he graduated from the West Surrey College of Art & Design (now the University for the Creative Arts) with his first film The Interview. Dudok de Wit has a son, the journalist and writer Alex Dudok de Wit.

== Career ==
After working for a year in Barcelona, he settled in London where he directs and animates award-winning commercials for television and cinema. In 1992, he created the short film Tom Sweep, followed by The Monk and the Fish (1994), which was made in France with the studio Folimage. This film was nominated for the Academy Award for Best Animated Short Film at the 67th Academy Awards, Best Short Animated Film at the 48th British Academy Film Awards and has won numerous prizes including a César Award for Best Short Film and the Cartoon d'or. Michael also writes and illustrates children's picture books and teaches animation at art colleges in England and abroad.

His film Father and Daughter (2000) won an Academy Award, a BAFTA Award, the Grand Prix at Annecy, Grand Prix at Animafest Zagreb and dozens of other major awards. In 2006, he made the short film The Aroma of Tea, which was drawn entirely with tea. His films The Monk and the Fish and Father and Daughter were included in the Animation Show of Shows. In 2016, he released the feature-length film The Red Turtle. It was nominated for Best Animated Feature Film at the 89th Academy Awards.

De Wit became a recipient of the Winsor McCay Award in 2025.

== Style ==
Since Tom Sweep, all Dudok de Wit's films have his trademark brush stroke drawing and his use of ink and watercolour.

== Filmography ==
=== Animation ===
- The Interview (1978)
- Tom Sweep (1992), short film
- The Monk and the Fish (Le Moine et le poisson) (1994), short film
- Father and Daughter (2000), short film
- The Aroma of Tea (2006), short film
- The Red Turtle (2016), feature film

=== Commercials ===
- "Actifed Germ" The Welcome Foundation, Cough Medicine
- "Heinz Egg" Heinz Salad Cream
- "The Long Sleep" Mcallan Malt Whiskey
- "VW Sunrise" Volkswagen
- "Pink Foot" Owen's Corning Roof Insulation
- "Smart Illusions" Nestlé Smarties
- "Noah" The Irish Lottery"
- "AT&T" five TV commercials
- "A Life" United Airlines

=== Film and television animation contributions ===
- The Canterbury Tales/The Knight's Tale (Television series, Pizazz/S4C, UK)
- The Lion, the Witch and The Wardrobe (TV Feature, US, UK and Spain) 1979
- Den segment of Heavy Metal (Film featuring the animation of Gerald Potterton, Canada, US & UK) 1980
- Mickey's Audition (Mickey Mouse Special, Disney, US) 1989
- Prince Cinders (Television special, UK) 1991
- Beauty and the Beast (Storyboarding, Walt Disney Feature Animation, US) 1992
- T.R.A.N.S.I.T. (Short film directed by Piet Kroon, UK and NL) 1997
- Charlie's Christmas (Television Special, Folimage, France) 1998
- Fantasia 2000 (Walt Disney Feature Animation) 2000
- Raining Cats and Frogs (Folimage) 2003

== Illustrations in books ==
- "Snakes and Ladders" (card game, 1991)
- "The History of Geneva" (Editions Chenoises, Geneva 1991)
- "Oscar & Hoo" (HarperCollins 2001) ISBN 3-7941-5022-8 (translated in various languages)
- "Oscar and Hoo Forever"(HarperCollins 2003) ISBN 0-00-714008-8 (translated in various languages)
- "Vader en dochter" (Leopold, NL, 2001) ISBN 90-258-3494-9 (translated in various languages)
- "Vier bevertjes in de nacht" (Leopold, NL, 2004) ISBN 90-74336-90-6 (translated in various languages)
- "Vier bevertjes en een kastanje" (Leopold, NL, 2007) ISBN 978-90-258-5030-2 (translated in various languages)
