= Tales of the Night (film) =

- French pre-release promotional poster
- Directed by: Michel Ocelot
- Written by: Michel Ocelot
- Produced by: Christophe Rossignon; Philip Boëffard
- Edited by: Patrick Ducruet
- Music by: Christian Maire
- Production companies: Nord-Ouest Films; Studio O StudioCanal
- Distributed by: StudioCanal
- Release dates: February 13, 2011 (Berlin); July 20, 2011 (France)
- Running time: 84 minutes
- Country: France
- Language: French
- Box office: $1.8 million

Tales of the Night (French: Les Contes de la nuit) is a 2011 French computer silhouette animation feature film directed by Michel Ocelot. It is a compilation movie for movie theaters of five episodes of Dragons et Princesses in stereoscopic 3D and one additional, until then unseen story, "The Girl-Doe and the Architect's Son" ("La Fille-biche et le fils de l'architecte"), for a total of six. It premiered in competition for the Golden Bear at the 61st Berlin International Film Festival on February 13, 2011 before its general release in France by StudioCanal on July 20.

It was released in the United States by GKIDS and the United Kingdom by Soda Pictures in 2012. In Japan, it is the fourth feature directed by Ocelot in the Ghibli Museum Library, where it was shown at the 2012 Tokyo International Anime Fair before a wider release in June 2012.

== Plot ==
A girl, a boy and an old cinema technician tell stories every night in a small theater. Before each story, the boy and the girl decide, in accordance with the old technician, they will play the characters in the story they will interpret, they also choose a time and a country as well as costumes through documentation the technician brings them, and make clothing and accessories with a computer-controlled machine. They then perform the story on stage.

=== The Werewolf ===
The first story takes place in Medieval Europe. The story of two sisters who are in love with the same prince. The prince is betrothed to the older one, much to the sadness of the younger one who has loved him all her life. However, the prince reveals to his betrothed that he transforms into a werewolf during the full moon. She is not pleased, and tricks him into transforming in front of her, then steals the gold necklace that will make him turn back into a human. She throws the necklace in the well and tells the people that the prince was eaten by the wolf of the woods. The younger sister figures out what her sister has done, and exposes her cruel actions.

=== Tijean and Beauty-Not-Knowing ===
The second story takes place in the West Indies. While exploring a cave down so far beneath the ground, Tijean finds himself in the land of the dead. The shadow of an old man tells him how to defeat three monsters; a giant bee, a giant mongoose, and a giant iguana. He finds his way into the king's court, whose eldest daughter, Beauty-Not-Knowing, is to be married. Since Tijean overcame the three monsters without killing them, he is deemed unworthy to marry the princess and is sentenced to death via the "big chopper". The king gives him three impossible tasks while he is in the dungeon. Fortunately, Tijean is saved by the three animals whose lives he spared.

=== The Chosen One and The City Of Gold ===
The third story is set in Aztec times. The inhabitants of a city made of gold worship a being called the Benefactor who gives them gold in exchange for a human sacrifice of the prettiest women in the land. One day a stranger arrives at the city and after discovering this sinister act he resolves to break this cycle of killing. The man is convinced there is a way to stop the Benefactor, however a prophecy says the city will collapse when the Benefactor falls.

=== The Boy Tam-Tam ===
The fourth story is set in a village in West Africa. A young boy who enjoys playing the tam-tam drums every day is chased away by the villagers who believe he is noisy and useless. The boy dreams of finding a magic drum, which will allow him to play well, and force anyone who listens to dance. One day he saves the life of an old man who turns out to be the keeper of the magic drum. The old man agrees to let the boy play on the precious instrument, but he can not activate its powers until after a long and difficult training. However the boy is found useful when he is able to play the drum to save his village from invaders.

=== The Boy Who Never Lied ===
The fifth story takes place in Tibet. The boy who never lies is a servant of the king and good friends with the king's talking horse, Mélongi. One day the king receives a visit from the king of the neighbouring kingdom who claims to have a singing mare named Sumaki. They both make a bet that the boy who rides the nation's talking horse cannot be made to lie. The rival king hatches a plan and enlists his daughter to seduce the boy who never lies and make him lie. For this she fakes a deadly disease and claims that it can heal by eating the heart of Mélongi.

=== The Doe-Girl and the Architect's Son ===
The sixth and final story is set once again in medieval Europe. Maud and Thibaut are very much in love with each other. Thibaut is the son of a famous architect and apprentice to his father's best friend. Maud is servant to a powerful but tyrannical wizard. The wizard sets off to marry Maud but when she refuses, he shuts her up in a tower. However, Thibaut is determined to save her, which causes the wizard to turn Maud into a beast. Thibaut and his master must then find a way to restore her human form.

== Cast ==
- Julien Béramis : Boy
- Marine Griset : Girl
- Yves Barsacq : Théo
- Sabine Pakora : The cook
- Fatoumata Diawara
- Firmine Richard
- Michel Ocelot

== Production ==
Five of the "Tales of the Night," namely "The Werewolf," "Tijean and the Beautiful Without Knowledge," "The Chosen One of the Golden City," "The Tam-Tam Boy," and "The Boy Who Never Lied," are adapted from the series "Dragons and Princesses," which aired on television in France on Canal+ Family at the end of 2010. They have been adapted for cinema and converted to 3D. The sixth tale, "The Doe-girl and the Architect's Son," was created specifically for the film.

== Box Office ==
The film was released in France on July 20, 2011. In its first week, it was screened in 402 copies and accumulated 142,877 admissions; it accumulated 186,452 in its second week, 215,549 in its third week, and 229,572 in its fourth week. In total, the film garnered over 500,000 admissions.
