= Lorenzo Mattotti =

Italian comics artist

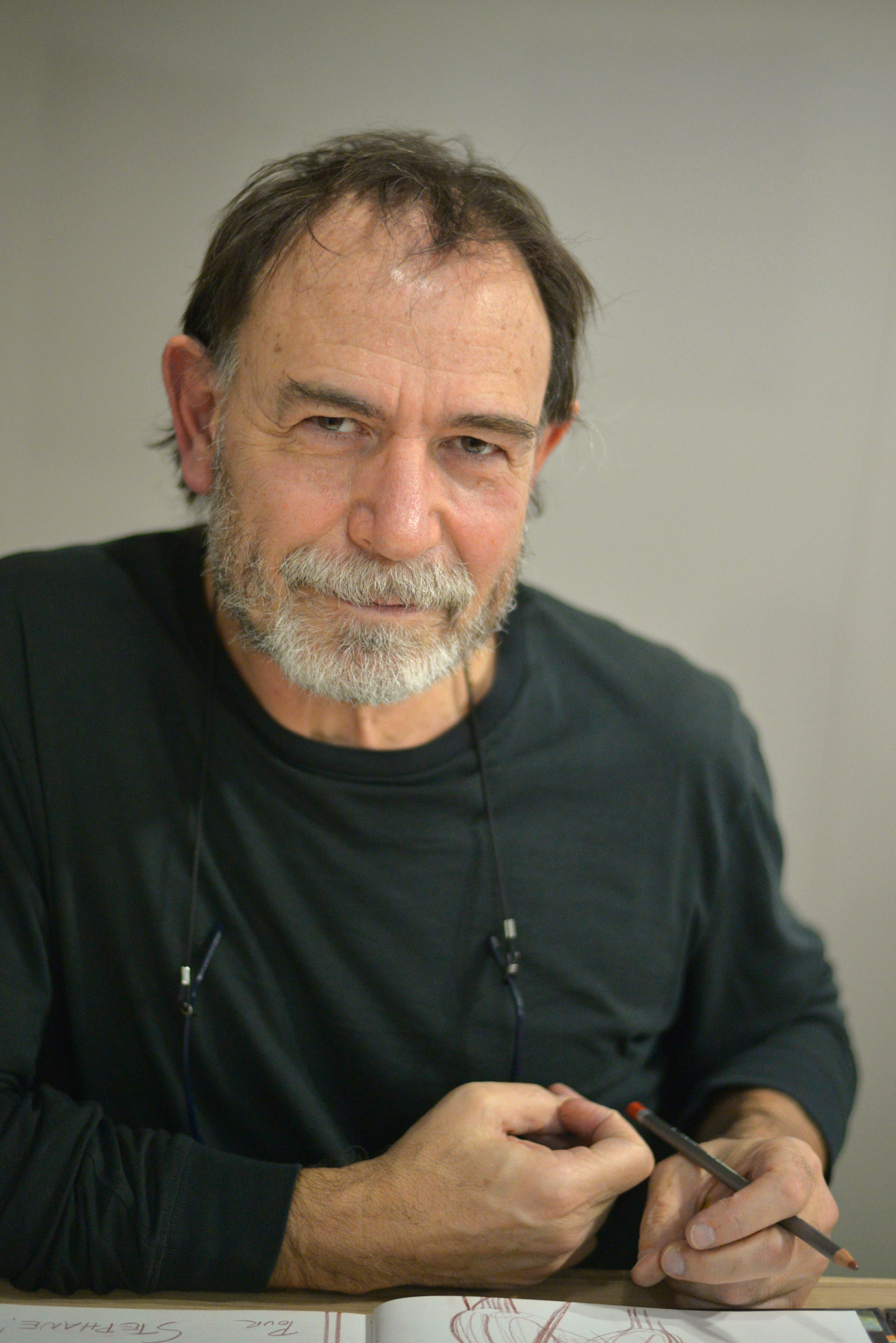
- Lorenzo Mattotti at Angoulême International Comics Festival in 2015.
- Born: January 24, 1954 (age 72) Brescia, Lombardy, Italy
- Area: Artist
- Awards: Full list

Lorenzo Mattotti (born 24 January 1954) is an Italian comics artist, illustrator and film director. He had an international breakthrough in the 1980s with the comic book Fires. His illustrations have been published in magazines such as Cosmopolitan, Vogue, The New Yorker, Le Monde and Vanity Fair. In comics, Mattotti won an Eisner Award in 2003 for his Dr Jekyll & Mr Hyde graphic novel. He directed the 2019 animated feature film The Bears' Famous Invasion of Sicily.

== Biography ==
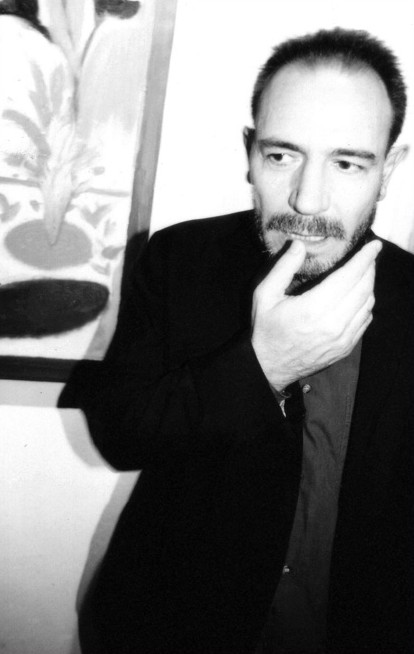
Mattotti in the 1990s

Born in Brescia, he studied architecture when he was young but did not finish the course. Instead, he became a comics artist. After a few traditional comic stories he decided he wanted to tell different kinds of stories and portray these in a different style.

Il Signor Spartaco was the first comic made under this ambition. The story centered on the dreams of a train passenger making it possible for Mattotti to use forms and colors in a way previously unseen in the classic French-Belgian comic world. He focused more on the inner world of his characters, and the total absence of an adventure was also a radical change in the comics universe.

Mattotti is mainly inspired by painters, musicians, writers and directors. To him, the relation between text and image should be the same as with text and music. The two should enrich each other. Unusually, in Mattotti's comics the text illustrates the illustration instead of the other way around. He always makes sure the text has enough ambiguity for multiple interpretations.

With Fires (1984) Mattotti made his name in the comics world. The story revolves around the struggle between nature and civilization. The main character is a crew member of a panzership who has to make sure a mysterious island is ready for civilization. Dreams and associations again play an important role. Although Fires has a clear story line, Mattotti evades an explicit, chronological story. The inner battle of the main character to change and get out of his strict environment is more important. Graphically the album is a highlight in his artistic career: he worked six years on the book, which resembles a gallery of paintings.

Having gained a reputation for his usage of colour, the black and white comic "The Man at the Window" (1992) surprised the public. Together with his ex-wife Lilia Ambrosi he made this comic about a man who searches his way in the world and who has troubles with relationships. The semi-autobiographical novel is a comic in which he uses different outings for pen drawings. He uses lines who as a text tell a story. The story is not so important and completely up to the reader to interpret.

In Caboto (1992), a comic book he drew as a commission from the Spanish government to commemorate the 500th birthday of Christopher Columbus' discovery of America, he tells the adventures of the explorer Sebastian Cabot. The story is poetic in tone and revolves around the fears and dreams of the people involved, including the women aboard the explorers' ship and the impressions the Indians might have had when first viewing the ships. Inspired by 16th century mannerism, he used a different style.

Stigmates (1998) was a new black and white comic with linear drawings, but darker and more nervous than The Man in the Window. It tells the tragic life of a drunk who wakes up one day with stigmata.

Apart from his comics Mattotti found fame as an illustrator. In 2011 Mattotti illustrated The Raven by famed musician Lou Reed. The book was published by the American publishing company Fantagraphics.

His debut as a film director was a segment in the animated horror anthology Fear(s) of the Dark, released in 2007. His first feature film was The Bears' Famous Invasion of Sicily, which premiered at the Cannes Film Festival 2019 in the section Un certain regard. The film is an animated adaptation of Dino Buzzati's 1945 children's book of the same title.

== Awards ==
- 1992: nominated for Best German-language Comic/Comic-related Publication at the Max & Moritz Prizes, Germany
- 1998: Inkpot Award, US
- 2003: Eisner Award for Best U.S. Edition of Foreign Material, USA

– nominated for the Artwork Award at the Angoulême International Comics Festival, France
– nominated for Outstanding Artist at the Ignatz Awards, USA

- 2009: U Giancu's Prize, International Cartoonists Exhibition
- 2017: Lucca Comics, Gran Guinigi for Best Graphic Novel, ITA

== Bibliography ==
=== Comics ===
- Il Signor Spartaco (1982)
- Incidenti (1984)
- Fires (1984) Published in English by Penguin Books
- Labyrinthes (1988, with Jerry Kramsky) Published in English by Penguin Books in a translation by Frank Wynne
- Murmur (1989) Published in English by Penguin Books in a translation by Frank Wynne
- Doctor Nefasto (1989, with Jerry Kramsky)
- Caboto (1992, with Jorge Zentner)
- L'Uomo alla Finestra (1992, with Lilia Ambrosi)
- L'Arbre du Penseur (1997)
- Stigmate (1998, with Claudio Piersanti)
- Dr Jekyll & Mr Hyde (2002, with Jerry Kramsky)
- El rumor de la escarcha (2003, with Jorge Zentner)
- Ghirlanda, (2017, with Jerry Kramsky)

=== Art portfolios/books ===
- Ligne Fragile (1999)
- Posters (2002)
- Angkor: Drawings Pastels Watercolors (2003)
- La stanza (2009), #logosedizioni
- Stanze/Chambres/Rooms (2010), #logosedizioni
- The Raven (2011), with Lou Reed, Fantagraphics
- Venezia (2011), #logosedizioni
- OLTREMAI (2013), #logosedizioni
- Mattotti Works 1: Pastels (2014), #logosedizioni
- Mattotti Works 2: Fashion (2014), #logosedizioni
- Vietnam (2014), Louis Vuitton Travelbooks
- Hansel and Gretel (2014, with Neil Gaiman)
- Blind (2017), #logosedizioni
- Covers for The New Yorker (2018), #logosedizioni (preface by Françoise Mouly)
- Rites, rivières, montagnes et châteaux (2021)

== Filmography ==
- Fear(s) of the Dark (Peur(s) du noir) (2007)
- The Bears' Famous Invasion of Sicily (La famosa invasione degli orsi in Sicilia) (2019)
