= Father and Daughter (film) =

Dutch film from 2000

- Screenshot
- Directed by: Michaël Dudok de Wit
- Written by: Michaël Dudok de Wit
- Produced by: Claire Jennings; Willem Thijssen
- Music by: Normand Roger; Denis L. Chartrand
- Production companies: CinéTé Filmproductie; Cloudrunner Ltd
- Release date: January 2000
- Running time: 8 minutes 30 seconds
- Countries: Netherlands; United Kingdom
- Language: No dialogue

Father and Daughter is a 2000 Dutch animated short film written and directed by Michaël Dudok de Wit. It won the Academy Award for Best Animated Short Film in 2001.

== Plot ==
A father tells his young daughter goodbye and leaves. The girl experiences her own seasons, similar to how the vast Dutch landscapes do. She grows into an older woman, starts a family, but she never stops yearning for her father. They are reunited at the film's ending in what seems to be a dream sequence or possibly the afterlife.

== Awards ==
The film received over 20 awards and 1 nomination, and is considered the most successful in the series of works by Dudok de Wit. It was also included in the Animation Show of Shows.

- BAFTA Award for Best Short Animation (25 February 2001)
- Academy Award for Best Animated Short Film (25 March 2001)
- Grand Prix at World Festival of Animated Film - Animafest Zagreb in 2002.

== See also ==
- 2000 in film
- Animation Show of Shows
