= List of adult animated feature films =

This is a list of adult animated feature films that were made from the 1910s onwards. These are films intended for a more mature audience than many animated feature films, all in theaters, direct-to-video, and streaming.

All of the animated films must follow to be include in the list with these rules:

- Judging from their MPAA ratings, any PG-rated animated films with highly use of subject matters or adult themes before the introduction of PG-13 rating in 1984 is included. After 1984, current PG-rated (or TV-PG below by the TV Parental Guidelines; if PG-13 film degraded with censorship as TV-PG per television premiere is included) animated films with similar themes (e.g. Corpse Bride and Shrek) is excluded.
- Television equivalents of MPA like TV-14 onwards must be included.
- Any animated films to be unrated by the MPA (e.g. Checkered Ninja and Chico and Rita) but with highly use of subject matters or adult themes must be included.
- Partial live-action films must have animation in no less than 65 percent of the running time.
  - Heavily use of photorealistic CGI and motion capture as visual effects (about 80-95 percent) in live-action or genre-driven films (e.g. James Cameron's Avatar franchise) is strictly excluded per violation guidelines of the animation medium.
- Short films, television series or web series are excluded.

== 1910s-1960s ==
| Year | Title | Country | Director(s) | Studio | Technique | Notes |
|---|---|---|---|---|---|---|
| 1917 | El Apóstol | Argentina | Quirino Cristiani | | Traditional/cutout | Lost film; first Argentine animated film |
| 1918 | Sin dejar rastros | Argentina | Quirino Cristiani | | Traditional/cutout | Lost film |
| 1931 | Peludópolis | Argentina | Quirino Cristiani | | Traditional/cutout | Lost film and the first animated feature film with sound |
| 1935 | The New Gulliver | Soviet Union | Aleksandr Ptushko | Mosfilm | Stop-motion/Live-action | The first animated feature film to be made in the Soviet Union. |
| 1937 | The Tale of the Fox | Germany, France | Ladislas Starevich, Irène Starevich | | Stop-motion | The first French animated film. |
| 1937 | The Seven Ravens | Germany | Ferdinand Diehl, Hermann Diehl | | Stop-motion | |
| 1941 | Princess Iron Fan | China | Wan Guchan, Wan Laiming | United China Film Company | Traditional | The first Chinese animated film. |
| 1945 | Momotaro: Sacred Sailors | Japan | Mitsuyo Seo | Shōchiku Dōga Kenkyūsho | Traditional | The first Japanese animated film. |
| 1951 | The Night Before Christmas | Soviet Union | Valentina Brumberg, Zinaida Brumberg | Soyuzmultfilm | Traditional | |
| 1953 | Tobias Knopp – Adventure of a Bachelor | West Germany | Gerhard Fieber | | Traditional | |
| 1953 | The Treasure of Bird Island | Czechoslovakia | Karel Zeman | | Traditional | |
| 1953 | Old Czech Legends | Czechoslovakia | Jiří Trnka | | Stop-motion | |
| 1954 | Animal Farm | UK | John Halas; Joy Batchelor | Halas and Batchelor | Traditional | First British animated feature. |
| 1961 | The Strange History of the Citizens of Shilda | East Germany | Johannes Hempel | DEFA-Studio für Trickfilme | Stop-motion | First animated film made in East Germany. |
| 1962 | Heaven and Earth Magic | US | Harry Everett Smith | Mystic Fire Video | Stop-motion | Originally released in 1957. |
| 1965 | West and Soda | Italy | Bruno Bozzetto | Cineriz | Traditional | |
| 1967 | Band of Ninja | Japan | Nagisa Oshima | Oshima Productions, Sozosha, Art Theatre Guild | Motion comic | |
| 1967 | Mr. and Mrs. Kabal's Theatre | France | Walerian Borowczyk | | Cutout/Traditional/Live action | |
| 1968 | Adam 2 | West Germany | Jan Lenica | Film Boris von Borrisholm, Lux-Film | Cutout | |
| 1968 | Yellow Submarine | US/UK | Robert Balser; George Dunning; Jack Stokes (animation) Dennis Abey; Al Brodax (live-action) | Apple Films; King Features Syndicate; TVC London; United Artists | Traditional; Live-action | |
| 1968 | Out of an Old Man's Head | Sweden | Per Åhlin (animation) Tage Danielsson (live-action) | Svensk Filmindustri | Traditional; Live-action | First Swedish animated feature.; (lit. 'I huvet på en gammal gubbe') |
| 1969 | A Thousand and One Nights | Japan | Eiichi Yamamoto | Mushi Production | Traditional | First animated film to receive the X rating in the US. |
| 1969 | Secret Picture: 1001 Nights of Ukiyo-ehiya | Japan | Leo Nisimura | Leo Production | Traditional | (lit. 'Maruhi Gekiga, Ukiyoe Senichiya'); First animated film to receive the R-18 in Japan.; Considered lost. |

== 1970s ==
| Year | Title | Country | Director | Studio | Technique | Notes |
|---|---|---|---|---|---|---|
| 1970 | Shinbone Alley | United States | John David Wilson | Fine Arts Films | Traditional | |
| 1970 | Cleopatra | Japan | Osamu Tezuka; Eiichi Yamamoto | Mushi Production | Traditional | |
| 1971 | Do It! Yasuji's Pornorama | Japan | Takateru Miwa; Shinichiro Takakuwa | Tokyo TV Movie | Traditional | Based on the erotic gag manga by Yasuji Tanioka |
| 1971 | Benny's Bathtub | Denmark | Jannik Hastrup, Flemming Quist Møller | Fiasco Film | Traditional | |
| 1972 | Fritz the Cat | US | Ralph Bakshi | Aurica Finance Company; Black Ink; Fritz Productions; Steve Krantz Productions | Traditional | First American animated film to receive the X rating. |
| 1973 | Heavy Traffic | US | Ralph Bakshi | Steve Krantz Productions | Traditional | |
| 1973 | Johnny Corncob | Hungary | Marcell Jankovics | Pannonia Film Studio | Traditional | First Hungarian animated feature.; (Hungarian: Kukorica Jancsi) |
| 1973 | Fantastic Planet | Czechoslovakia/France | René Laloux | Jiří Trnka Studio | Traditional | |
| 1973 | King Dick | Italy | Gibba | | Traditional | (lit. 'Il Nano e la Strega') |
| 1973 | Belladonna of Sadness | Japan/France | Eiichi Yamamoto | Mushi Production | Traditional | |
| 1973 | Once Upon a Time | Italy, West Germany | Roberto Gavioli, Rolf Kauka | Kauka-Film, Gamma Film | Traditional | |
| 1974 | The Nine Lives of Fritz the Cat | US | Robert Taylor | Steve Krantz Productions; Cine Camera; American International Pictures | Traditional | First American animated film to receive an R rating. |
| 1974 | Down and Dirty Duck | US | Charles Swenson | New World Pictures | Traditional | |
| 1975 | Coonskin | US | Ralph Bakshi | | Traditional | |
| 1975 | Tarzoon: Shame of the Jungle | Belgium/France | Picha; Boris Szulzinger | | Traditional | |
| 1976 | Allegro non troppo | Italy | Bruno Bozzetto | Bruno Bozzetto Film | Traditional | |
| 1976 | Once Upon a Girl | US | Don Jurwich | | Traditional | Originally rated X, rating surrendered by Severin Films for unrated DVD release. |
| 1976 | Everybody Rides the Carousel | US | John Hubley | Hubley Studios | Traditional | |
| 1977 | Fantastic Animation Festival | US | Richard M. Audd | Voyage Productions | Traditional | |
| 1977 | Wizards | US | Ralph Bakshi | | Traditional | |
| 1978 | The Lord of the Rings | US | Ralph Bakshi | | Traditional; Rotoscoping | |
| 1978 | Watership Down | UK | Martin Rosen | Nepenthe Productions | Traditional | Based on the 1972 novel by Richard Adams |
| 1978 | Metamorphoses | United States, Japan | Terry Ogisu, Takashi, Hiro Tsugawa | Sanrio | Traditional | |
| 1978 | Lupin III: The Mystery of Mamo | Japan | Sōji Yoshikawa | Tokyo Movie Shinsha | Traditional | |
| 1978 | Ringing Bell | Japan | Masami Hata | Sanrio | Traditional | Based on Ringing Bell by Takashi Yanase |
| 1978 | Tadhana | Philippines | Severino "Nonoy" Marcelo | National Media Production Center | Traditional | First Philippine animated feature. |
| 1979 | Galaxy Express 999 | Japan | Rintaro | Toei Animation | Traditional | |
| 1979 | The Adventure of Sudsakorn | Thailand | Payut Ngaokrachang | Jirabanterng Film | Traditional | |
| 1979 | Historias de amor y masacre | Spain | Jordi Amorós | Ediciones Amaika, Estudios Equip Dibujos Animados | Traditional/Live-action | |
| 1979 | Ubu et la Grande Gidouille | France | Jan Lenica | Les Films Armorial, Magic Film | Cutout | |

== 1980s ==
| Year | Title | Country | Director | Studio | Animation technique | Notes |
|---|---|---|---|---|---|---|
| 1980 | Foam Bath | Hungary | György Kovásznai | Pannonia Film Studio | Traditional | (lit. 'Habfürdö') |
| 1980 | The Missing Link | Belgium/France | Picha | Pils Film | Traditional | |
| 1980 | Bloody Lady | Czechoslovakia | Viktor Kubal | | Traditional | |
| 1981 | American Pop | US | Ralph Bakshi | Columbia Pictures; Bakshi Productions | Traditional; Rotoscoping | |
| 1981 | Rennyo and His Mother | Japan | Kihachirō Kawamoto | | Stop-motion; Puppet | |
| 1981 | Heavy Metal | Canada | Gerald Potterton | Columbia Pictures | Traditional | First Canadian animated feature. |
| 1981 | Grendel Grendel Grendel | Australia | Alexander Stitt | Victorian Film | Traditional | |
| 1981 | Adieu Galaxy Express 999 | Japan | Rintaro | Toei Animation | Traditional | |
| 1981 | Son of the White Mare | Hungary | Marcell Jankovics | Pannonia Film Studio; MOKÉP; Arbelos Films | Traditional | |
| 1982 | Time Masters | France/West Germany/Switzerland/UK/Hungary | René Laloux; Tibor Hernádi | Télécip; TF1 Films Production; Westdeutscher Rundfunk; Südwestrundfunk; Radio-Télévision Suisse Romande; British Broadcasting Corporation; Pannonia Film Studio; Hungarofilm | Traditional | (lit. 'Les Maîtres du temps') |
| 1982 | The Last Unicorn | US/Japan | Arthur Rankin Jr. Jules Bass | Rankin/Bass Productions; Topcraft ITC Films | Traditional | The Last Unicorn by Peter S. Beagle |
| 1982 | GoShogun | Japan | Kunihiko Yuyama | Ashi Productions | Traditional | Based on GoShogun by Kunihiko Yuyama |
| 1982 | The Black Planet | Australia | Paul Williams | Fable Film Productions | Traditional | |
| 1982 | The Plague Dogs | US/UK | Martin Rosen | United Artists; Nepenthe Productions | Traditional | In 1985, it became the first animated film to receive the PG-13 in the US. |
| 1982 | Space Adventure Cobra: The Movie | Japan | Osamu Dezaki | Tokyo Movie Shinsha | Traditional | |
| 1982 | Shalom Pharoh | West Germany | Curt Linda | Linda Film, Zweites Deutsches Fernsehen (ZDF), atlas Film | Traditional | |
| 1982 | Treasure Planet | Bulgaria | Rumen Petkov | Boyana Film | Traditional | |
| 1982 | Hey Good Lookin' | US | Ralph Bakshi | Warner Bros. Pictures | Traditional | |
| 1982 | Chronopolis | France, Poland | Piotr Kamler | Saint-André-des-Arts | Stop motion | |
| 1982 | Pink Floyd – The Wall | United Kingdom | Alan Parker, Gerald Scarfe | Metro-Goldwyn-Mayer | Live action/Traditional | |
| 1983 | Barefoot Gen | Japan | Mori Masaki | Madhouse | Traditional | |
| 1983 | Háry János | Hungary | Zsolt Richly, Marcell Jankovics | Pannónia Filmstúdió | Traditional | |
| 1983 | Twice Upon a Time | US | John Korty, Charles Swenson | Lucasfilm, Ltd. / The Ladd Company; Warner Bros. | Lumage Technique | |
| 1983 | Fire and Ice | US | Ralph Bakshi | 20th Century-Fox; Producers Sales Organization | Traditional; Rotoscoping | |
| 1983 | Rock & Rule | Canada | Clive A. Smith | Nelvana; United Artists | Traditional | |
| 1983 | Urusei Yatsura: Only You | Japan | Mamoru Oshii | Pierrot | Traditional | |
| 1983 | Golgo 13: The Professional | Japan | Osamu Dezaki | Tokyo Movie Shinsha | Traditional; CGI | |
| 1984 | Lensman | Japan | Yoshiaki Kawajiri; Kazuyuki Hirokawa | Madhouse | Traditional; CGI | |
| 1984 | Macross: Do You Remember Love? | Japan | Noboru Ishiguro; Shōji Kawamori | Artland; Tatsunoko Production; Topcraft | Traditional | |
| 1984 | Nausicaä of the Valley of the Wind | Japan | Hayao Miyazaki | Topcraft | Traditional | |
| 1984 | Urusei Yatsura: Beautiful Dreamer | Japan | Mamoru Oshii | Pierrot | Traditional | |
| 1984 | Bagi, the Monster of Mighty Nature | Japan | Osamu Tezuka | Tezuka Productions | Traditional | |
| 1984 | Snow White | Hungary | József Nepp | Pannónia Filmstúdió | Traditional | |
| 1984 | Samson & Sally | Denmark/Sweden | Jannik Hastrup | Dansk Tegnefilm | Traditional | |
| 1985 | Vampires in Havana | Cuba/Spain | Juan Padrón | | Traditional | |
| 1985 | Gwen, or the Book of Sand | France | Jean-François Laguionie | Gaumont | Traditional | |
| 1985 | Angel's Egg | Japan | Mamoru Oshii | Tokuma Shoten | Traditional | |
| 1985 | The Dagger of Kamui | Japan | Rintaro | Madhouse; Project Team Argos | Traditional | |
| 1985 | GoShogun: The Time Étranger | Japan | Kunihiko Yuyama | Ashi Productions | Traditional | Based on GoShogun by Kunihiko Yuyama |
| 1985 | Lupin III: Legend of the Gold of Babylon | Japan | Seijun Suzuki; Shigetsugu Yoshida | Tokyo Movie Shinsha | Traditional | |
| 1985 | Starchaser: The Legend of Orin | US | Steven Hahn | Young Sung Production Co. Ltd. | Traditional | |
| 1985 | Urusei Yatsura 3: Remember My Love | Japan | Kazuo Yamazaki | Studio Deen | Traditional | |
| 1985 | Urusei Yatsura: Ryoko's September Tea Party | Japan | | Studio Deen | Traditional | |
| 1985 | Vampire Hunter D | Japan | Toyoo Ashida | Toho; Ashi Production | Traditional | Based on Vampire Hunter D Volume 1 by Hideyuki Kikuchi |
| 1985 | Penguin's Memory: Shiawase Monogatari | Japan | Shinji Kimura | Animation Staff Room | Traditional | Uses the penguin mascots from the Suntory's CAN Beer. |
| 1986 | Arion | Japan | Yoshikazu Yasuhiko | Sunrise | Traditional | |
| 1986 | Barefoot Gen 2 | Japan | Toshio Hirata | Madhouse | Traditional | |
| 1986 | Fist of the North Star | Japan | Toyoo Ashida | Toei Animation | Traditional | |
| 1986 | When the Wind Blows | UK | Jimmy T. Murakami | Meltdown Productions | Traditional | |
| 1986 | Footrot Flats: The Dog's Tale | New Zealand | Murray Ball | Kerridge-Odeon | Traditional | |
| 1986 | The Cosmic Eye | United States | Faith Hubley | Hubley Studios | Traditional | |
| 1986 | Cat City | Hungary | Béla Ternovszky | | Traditional | |
| 1986 | Sophie's Place | United States | Larry Jordan | | Traditional | Experimental film. |
| 1987 | Neo Tokyo | Japan | Rintaro; Yoshiaki Kawajiri; Katsuhiro Otomo | Project Team Agros; Madhouse | Traditional | |
| 1987 | Robot Carnival | Japan | Atsuko Fukushima; Katsuhiro Otomo; Koji Morimoto; Hidetoshi Omori; Yasuomi Umetsu; Hiroyuki Kitazume; Mao Lamdo; Hiroyuki Kitakubo; Takashi Nakamura | A.P.P.P. | Traditional | |
| 1987 | Saint Seiya: The Movie | Japan | Kōzō Morishita | Toei Animation | | |
| 1987 | Wicked City | Japan | Yoshiaki Kawajiri | Madhouse | | |
| 1987 | Twilight of the Cockroaches | Japan | Hiroaki Yoshida | Madhouse; Kitty Films | Traditional; Live-action | |
| 1987 | The Amazing Mr. Bickford | US | Bruce Bickford, Frank Zappa | | Stop motion | |
| 1987 | The Big Bang | Belgium/France | Picha | | Traditional | |
| 1987 | Lupin III: The Fuma Conspiracy | Japan | Masayuki Ōzeki | Tokyo Movie Shinsha | Traditional | |
| 1987 | Laughter and Grief by the White Sea | Soviet Union | Leonid Nosyrev | Soyuzmultfilm | Traditional | |
| 1987 | Rock Odyssey | United States | Joseph Barbera, William Hanna, Robert Taylor (uncredited) | Hanna Barbera | Traditional | |
| 1987 | Gandahar | US/France | René Laloux | SEK Studio | Traditional | |
| 1988 | Mobile Suit Gundam: Char's Counterattack | Japan | Yoshiyuki Tomino | Sunrise | Traditional; CGI | |
| 1988 | Grave of the Fireflies | Japan | Isao Takahata | Studio Ghibli; Shinchosha | Traditional | |
| 1988 | Appleseed | Japan | Kazuyoshi Katayama | Gainax | Traditional | |
| 1988 | Akira | Japan | Katsuhiro Otomo | Tokyo Movie Shinsha | Traditional | |
| 1988 | Demon City Shinjuku | Japan | Yoshiaki Kawajiri | Madhouse | Traditional | |
| 1988 | Treasure Island | USSR | David Cherkassky | Kievnauchfilm | Live-action; Traditional | |
| 1988 | Alice | Czechoslovakia | Jan Švankmajer | Channel Four Films, Condor Films | Live-action; Stop-motion | |
| 1988 | The Cat Who Walked by Herself | Soviet Union | Ideya Garanina | Soyuzmultfilm | Stop-motion; Traditional | |
| 1988 | Who Framed Roger Rabbit | United States | Robert Zemeckis | Touchstone Pictures, Amblin Entertainment, Silver Screen Partners III, Walt Disney Feature Animation | Live-action; Traditional | |
| 1988 | The Son of the Stars | Romania | Mircea Toia | Animafilm, Româniafilm | Traditional | |
| 1989 | Marquis | Belgium/France | Henri Xhonneux | Aligator Producciones; Tchin Tchin Productions | Live-action; Stop-motion | |
| 1989 | Urotsukidōji | Japan | Hideki Takayama | Phoenix Entertainment; Shochiku-Fuji | Traditional | |
| 1989 | Riding Bean | Japan | Yasuo Hasegawa | AIC | Traditional | |

== 1990s ==
| Year | Title | Country | Director | Studio | Notes | Animation technique |
|---|---|---|---|---|---|---|
| 1990 | War of the Birds | Denmark | Jannik Hastrup | Dansk Tegnefilm | | Traditional |
| 1990 | A Wind Named Amnesia | Japan | Kazuo Yamazaki | Madhouse | | Traditional |
| 1990 | Werner – Beinhart! | Germany | Niki List; Gerhard Hahn; Michael Schaack | Constantin Film | | Traditional; Live-action |
| 1990 | Black Bento | Japan | Tetsu Dezaki | Kyodo Eiga | | Traditional |
| 1991 | To Want to Fly | Italy | Guido Manuli, Maurizio Nichetti | Pentafilm – Bambù, Pentafilm Distribuzione | | Live-action/Traditional |
| 1991 | Only Yesterday | Japan | Isao Takahata | Studio Ghibli | | Traditional |
| 1991 | Roujin Z | Japan | Hiroyuki Kitakubo | The Television Inc. Movic Co; TV Asahi; Sony Music Entertainment Japan; A.P.P.P. | | Traditional |
| 1991 | The Sensualist | Japan | Yukio Abe | Grouper Production | | Traditional |
| 1991 | Kayoko's Diary | Japan | Seiji Arihara | Mushi Production | | Traditional |
| 1992 | The Little Punker | Germany | Michael Schaack | Trickcompany | | Traditional |
| 1992 | Bebe's Kids | United States | Bruce W. Smith | Paramount Pictures; Hyperion Studio | Was one of the first animated films to have an all African-American cast. | Traditional |
| 1992 | Cool World | United States | Ralph Bakshi | Bakshi Animation; Paramount Pictures | | Traditional |
| 1992 | Shōjo Tsubaki | Japan | Hiroshi Harada | | | Traditional |
| 1992 | The Spirit of Christmas: Jesus vs. Frosty | United States | Trey Parker; Matt Stone | Avenging Conscience | | Cutout; Stop-motion |
| 1992 | Evil Toons | United States | Fred Olen Ray | | | Traditional; Live-action |
| 1992 | The Tune | United States | Bill Plympton | October Films | | Traditional |
| 1993 | Ninja Scroll | Japan | Yoshiaki Kawajiri | Toho | | Traditional |
| 1993 | Ocean Waves | Japan | Tomomi Mochizuki | Studio Ghibli | | Traditional |
| 1993 | Patlabor 2: The Movie | Japan | Mamoru Oshii | Production I.G | | Traditional |
| 1993 | Yu Yu Hakusho: The Movie | Japan | Noriyuki Abe | Studio Pierrot | | Traditional |
| 1993 | Zit: The Video | United Kingdom | Keith Bateman | Screen Entertainment; A.K. Music | | Traditional |
| 1993 | The Secret Adventures of Tom Thumb | United Kingdom | Dave Borthwick | bolexbrothers | | Stop motion |
| 1993 | Opéra imaginaire | France | | | | Traditional/Stop motion/CGI |
| 1993 | The Cat's Mill | Latvia | Roze Stiebra | Dauka | | Traditional |
| 1993 | The Thief and the Cobbler | United States/United Kingdom/Canada | Richard Williams | Richard Williams Productions / Allied Filmmakers | | Traditional |
| 1994 | Felidae | Germany | Michael Schaack | TFC Trickompany | Based on the novel by Akif Pirinçci | Traditional |
| 1994 | Rocky & Hudson | Brazil | Otto Guerra | Otto Desenhos Animados | | Traditional |
| 1994 | Blue Seagull | South Korea | Oh Jung-il | Yong Seong CineCom, Cine Line Korea | | Traditional |
| 1994 | Yu Yu Hakusho: Poltergeist Report | Japan | Masakatsu Iijima | Studio Pierrot; Movic | | Traditional |
| 1994 | Darkside Blues | Japan | Nobuyasu Furukawa | J.C.Staff | Based on the manga by Hideyuki Kikuchi | Traditional |
| 1995 | Ghost in the Shell | Japan; United Kingdom | Mamoru Oshii | Production I.G. | | Traditional |
| 1995 | Drawn from Memory | United States | Paul Fierlinger | | | Traditional |
| 1995 | Farewell to Nostradamus | Japan | Shunya Itō; Takeshi Shirato | Tokyo Movie Shinsha Telecom Animation Film | | Traditional |
| 1995 | Memories | Japan | Kōji Morimoto (Magnetic Rose); Tensai Okamura (Stink Bomb); Katsuhiro Otomo (Cannon Fodder) | Studio 4°C (Magnetic Rose, Cannon Fodder); Madhouse, Inc. (Stink Bomb) | | Traditional |
| 1995 | The Spirit of Christmas: Jesus vs. Santa | United States | Trey Parker; Matt Stone | Krankin-Brass Productions | | Cutout; Stop-motion |
| 1996 | Beavis and Butt-Head Do America | United States | Mike Judge | Paramount Pictures; MTV Films; MTV Feature Animation | | Traditional |
| 1996 | Werner – Das muß kesseln!!! | Germany | Udo Beissel, Michael Schaack | Neue Constantin Film, Hahn Film AG, Royal Film Produktion, TFC Trickompany Film Produktion | | Traditional |
| 1996 | Spring and Chaos | Japan | Shōji Kawamori | Group TAC, NNS | | Traditional |
| 1996 | Conspirators of Pleasure | Czech Republic; Switzerland; United Kingdom | Jan Švankmajer | | | Stop-motion; Live-action |
| 1996 | Lupin III: Dead or Alive | Japan | Monkey Punch | Tokyo Movie Shinsha | | Traditional |
| 1996 | Tenchi the Movie: Tenchi Muyo in Love | Japan | Hiroshi Negishi | Anime International Company | | Traditional |
| 1996 | The Wire | United States | Aaron Augenblick | School of Visual Arts | | Traditional |
| 1997 | Go to Hell!! | Australia | Ray Nowland | Energee Entertainment | | Traditional |
| 1997 | The Midnight Carnival | United States | Aaron Augenblick | School of Visual Arts | | Traditional |
| 1997 | The Little Bastard | Germany | Michael Schaack, Veit Vollmer | Hahn Film AG (uncredited), Senator Film Produktion, TCB Toon Company Berlin, TFC Trickompany Filmproduktion | | Traditional |
| 1997 | Katharina & Witt, Fiction & Reality | Germany | Mariola Brillowska, Charles Kissing | Interpol Studios Hamburg | | Traditional |
| 1997 | Neon Genesis Evangelion: Death & Rebirth | Japan | Hideaki Anno; Masayuki; Kazuya Tsurumaki | Gainax | | Traditional |
| 1997 | The End of Evangelion | Japan | Hideaki Anno; Kazuya Tsurumaki | Gainax | | Traditional |
| 1997 | Perfect Blue | Japan | Satoshi Kon | Madhouse | | Traditional; CGI |
| 1997 | Princess Mononoke | Japan | Hayao Miyazaki | Studio Ghibli | | Traditional |
| 1997 | Tenchi the Movie 2: The Daughter of Darkness | Japan | Tetsu Kimura | Anime International Company | | Traditional |
| 1997 | I Married a Strange Person! | United States | Bill Plympton | Lionsgate; Italtoons | | Traditional |
| 1998 | Galaxy Express 999: Eternal Fantasy | Japan | Kōnosuke Uda | Toei Animation | | Traditional |
| 1998 | Golgo 13: Queen Bee | Japan | Osamu Dezaki | Tezuka Productions | | Traditional |
| 1998 | Spriggan | Japan | Hirotsuga Kawasaki | Studio 4°C | | Traditional |
| 1998 | Martian Successor Nadesico: The Motion Picture – Prince of Darkness | Japan | Tatsuo Satō | Production I.G; Xebec | | Traditional |
| 1998 | Gen¹³ | United States | Kevin Altieri | WildStorm Productions; Aegis Entertainment | | Traditional |
| 1998 | Antz | United States | Eric Darnell; Tim Johnson | DreamWorks Pictures; DreamWorks Animation; PDI | | CGI |
| 1998 | Kirikou and the Sorceress | France; Belgium; Luxembourg | Michel Ocelot | France 3 Cinéma; Les Armateurs; Monipoly Productions; Odec Kid Cartoons; Rija Studio; Studio O Trans Europe Film; Gébéka Films | | Traditional |
| 1998 | Socializacija bika? | Slovenia | Zvonko Coh, Milan Eric | E-motion Film; RTV Slovenija; SKUC | | Traditional |
| 1998 | Kite | Japan | Yasuomi Umetsu | ARMS | | Traditional |
| 1999 | Jin-Roh: The Wolf Brigade | Japan | Hiroyuki Okiura | Production I.G; Bandai Visual | | Traditional |
| 1999 | South Park: Bigger, Longer & Uncut | United States | Trey Parker | Paramount Pictures; Warner Bros. Pictures; Comedy Central Films | | CGI |
| 1999 | Werner – Volles Rooäää!!! | Germany | Gerhard Hahn | Achterbahn AG, Constantin Film, Hahn Film AG | | Traditional |
| 1999 | Tenchi Forever! The Movie | Japan | Hiroshi Negishi | Anime International Company | | Traditional |

== 2000s ==
| Year | Title | Country | Director | Studio | Notes | Animation technique |
|---|---|---|---|---|---|---|
| 2000 | Amon: The Darkside of The Devilman | Japan | Kenichi Takeshita | Studio Live | | Traditional |
| 2000 | Blood: The Last Vampire | Japan | Hiroyuki Kitakubo | Production I.G. | | Traditional |
| 2000 | Escaflowne | Japan | Kazuki Akane | Bones (animation); Sunrise (production) | | Traditional |
| 2000 | Sin: The Movie | Japan | Yasunori Urata | Phoenix Entertainment | | Traditional |
| 2000 | Heavy Metal 2000 | Canada | Michael Coldewey; Michel Lemire | CineGroupe | | Traditional |
| 2000 | Little Otik | Czech Republic; United Kingdom | Jan Švankmajer | Zeitgeist Films | Based on Otesánek by Karel Jaromír Erben | Stop-motion; Live-action |
| 2000 | One Piece | Japan | Junji Shimizu | Toei Animation; Fuji Television; Shueisha; Toei Company | Based on One Piece by Eiichiro Oda | Traditional |
| 2000 | Is It Fall Yet? | United States | Glenn Eichler; Peggy Nicoll | MTV Animation | First of two film-length installments for MTV's animated series Daria. | Traditional |
| 2000 | Vampire Hunter D: Bloodlust | United States; Japan | Yoshiaki Kawajiri | Madhouse | Based on Vampire Hunter D Volume 3: Demon Deathcase by Hideyuki Kikuchi | Traditional |
| 2000 | Batman Beyond: Return of the Joker | United States | Curt Geda | Warner Bros. | Censored version released in 2000, uncut version released in 2002. | Traditional |
| 2001 | Mutant Aliens | United States | Bill Plympton | Plymptoons | | Traditional |
| 2001 | The House of Morecock | United States | Joe Phillips | | | Traditional |
| 2001 | Inuyasha the Movie: Affections Touching Across Time | Japan | Toshiya Shinohara | Sunrise | | Traditional |
| 2001 | Metropolis | Japan | Rintaro | Madhouse | Based on the manga of the same name | Traditional |
| 2001 | Cowboy Bebop, Knockin' on Heaven's Door | Japan | Shinichirō Watanabe | Bones | | Traditional |
| 2001 | Final Fantasy: The Spirits Within | United States; Japan | Hironobu Sakaguchi; Motonori Sakakibara | Square Pictures | | CGI; Motion capture |
| 2001 | Millennium Actress | Japan | Satoshi Kon | Madhouse | | Traditional |
| 2001 | Monkeybone | United States | Henry Selick | 20th Century Fox; 1492 Pictures | | Stop-motion; Live-action |
| 2001 | Waking Life | United States | Richard Linklater | Fox Searchlight | | Rotoscoping |
| 2002 | Eight Crazy Nights | United States | Seth Kearsley | Columbia Pictures; Happy Madison Productions | | Traditional |
| 2002 | Is It College Yet? | United States | Glenn Eichler; Peggy Nicoll | MTV Animation | Second of two film-length installments for MTV's animated series Daria. | Traditional |
| 2002 | WXIII: Patlabor the Movie 3 | Japan | Fumihiko Takayama; Takuji Endo | Madhouse | | Traditional |
| 2002 | Inuyasha the Movie: The Castle Beyond the Looking Glass | Japan | Toshiya Shinohara | Sunrise | | Traditional |
| 2002 | Tamala 2010: A Punk Cat in Space | Japan | t.o.L | Kinétique | | Traditional |
| 2002 | Lupin III: Return of Pycal | Japan | Mamoru Hamatsu | TMS Entertainment | | Traditional |
| 2002 | Mercano, the Martian | Argentina | Juan Antín | Universidad Del Cine | | Traditional; CGI |
| 2002 | Fimfárum | Czech Republic | Aurel Klimt; Vlasta Pospíšilová | Krátký film Praha | | Stop-motion |
| 2002 | My Beautiful Girl, Mari | South Korea | Lee Sung-gang | Daewoo Entertainment; Kuh Dong; Siz Entertainment | | Traditional |
| 2002 | Song of the Miraculous Hind | Hungary | Marcell Jankovics | Pannonia Film Studio; Budapest Film | | Traditional |
| 2003 | The Animatrix | United States; Japan | Kōji Morimoto; Shinichirō Watanabe; Mahiro Maeda; Peter Chung; Andrew R. Jones; Yoshiaki Kawajiri; Takeshi Koike | Village Roadshow Pictures; Square Pictures; Studio 4°C; Madhouse | Nine animated short films based on The Matrix trilogy | Traditional; CGI |
| 2003 | Dominator | United Kingdom | Tony Luke | Renga Media | | CGI |
| 2003 | Batman: Mystery of the Batwoman | United States | Curt Geda | Warner Bros. Television Animation | | Traditional |
| 2003 | Cesante | Chile | Ricardo Amunátegui | Emu Films; Sobras Producciones; ADN Digital | | Traditional |
| 2003 | Jake's Booty Call | United States | Eric Eisner; J. Chad Hammes | Romp Studios | | Flash |
| 2003 | Kaena: The Prophecy | France; Canada | Chris Delaporte; Pascal Pinon | Xilam Animation | | CGI |
| 2003 | Interstella 5555: The 5tory of the 5ecret 5tar 5ystem | France; Japan | Kazuhisa Takenouchi | Toei Animation; Daft Life Ltd; Wild Bunch; BAC Films | | Traditional |
| 2003 | Inuyasha the Movie: Swords of an Honorable Ruler | Japan | Toshiya Shinohara | Sunrise | | Traditional |
| 2003 | One Piece The Movie: Dead End no Bōken | Japan | Kōnosuke Uda | Toei Animation; Toei Company | Based on One Piece by Eiichiro Oda | Traditional |
| 2003 | Winter Days | Japan | Kihachirō Kawamoto | | | Traditional |
| 2003 | Sky Blue | South Korea | Kim Moon-saeng | Endgame Productions Inc. Masquerade Films; Maxmedia; Tin House Productions | | Traditional; CGI |
| 2003 | Mécanix | Canada | Rémy M. Larochelle | Ofilms, Avant-Gore | | Traditional; Live-action |
| 2003 | The Son of Satan | United States | JJ Villard | California Institute of the Arts | | Traditional |
| 2003 | Tokyo Godfathers | Japan | Satoshi Kon | Madhouse | | Traditional |
| 2003 | Werner – Gekotzt wird später! | Germany | | | | Traditional |
| 2003 | The Triplets of Belleville | France; United Kingdom; Canada | Sylvain Chomet | Les Armateurs; Production Champion; Vivi Film; France 3 Cinéma; RGP Productions | | Traditional |
| 2003 | More Vampires in Havana | Cuba; Spain | Juan Padrón | Cuban Institute of Cinematographic Art and Industry | | Traditional |
| 2004 | Terkel in Trouble | Denmark | Kresten Vestbjerg | Nordisk Film | | CGI |
| 2004 | Hair High | United States | Bill Plympton | Plymptoons | | Traditional |
| 2004 | Appleseed | Japan | Shinji Aramaki | Micott & Basara; Digital Frontier | | CGI |
| 2004 | Derrick – Duty Calls! | Germany, Ireland | | | | Traditional |
| 2004 | The Chronicles of Riddick: Dark Fury | United States | Peter Chung | Universal Studios Home Entertainment | Acts as a bridge passage between Pitch Black and The Chronicles of Riddick. | Traditional |
| 2004 | Dead Leaves | Japan | Hiroyuki Imaishi | Production I.G. | | Traditional |
| 2004 | Ghost in the Shell 2: Innocence | Japan | Mamoru Oshii | Production I.G. Studio Ghibli | | Traditional |
| 2004 | Inuyasha the Movie: Fire on the Mystic Island | Japan | Toshiya Shinohara | Sunrise | | Traditional |
| 2004 | Lady Death: The Motion Picture | United States | Andrew Orjuela | ADV Films | | Traditional |
| 2004 | Mind Game | Japan | Masaaki Yuasa | Studio 4°C | | Traditional |
| 2004 | Naruto the Movie: Ninja Clash in the Land of Snow | Japan | Tensai Okamura | Studio Pierrot | Based on Naruto by Masashi Kishimoto | Traditional |
| 2004 | One Piece: The Cursed Holy Sword | Japan | Kazuhisa Takenōchi | Toei Animation; Toei Company | Based on One Piece by Eiichiro Oda | Traditional |
| 2004 | Steamboy | Japan | Katsuhiro Otomo | Sunrise | | Traditional |
| 2004 | Van Helsing: The London Assignment | United States | Sharon Bridgeman | Universal Animation Studios | Animated prequel to the 2004 motion picture Van Helsing | Traditional |
| 2004 | Frank and Wendy | Estonia | Kaspar Jancis, Ülo Pikkov, Priit Tender | | | Traditional |
| 2004 | The District! | Hungary | Áron Gauder | | | Caricaturistic |
| 2004 | Strings | Denmark, Sweden, Norway, United Kingdom | Anders Rønnow Klarlund | BOB Film Sweden AB, Bald Film, Film and Music Entertainment, Mainstream ApS, Nordisk Film, Radar Film, Sandrew Metronome Distribution, Zentropa Entertainments | | Puppetry |
| 2004 | Team America: World Police | Germany, United States | Trey Parker | Scott Rudin Productions | | Puppetry |
| 2005 | Disaster! | United States | Roy T. Wood | | | Claymation |
| 2005 | Kirikou and the Wild Beasts | France; Vietnam | Michel Ocelot; Bénédicte Galup | Les Armateurs; Jet Media; Armada; Gébéka Films | | Traditional |
| 2005 | Final Fantasy VII: Advent Children | Japan | Tetsuya Nomura | Visual Works | Film sequel to the video game Final Fantasy VII | CGI |
| 2005 | Fullmetal Alchemist the Movie: Conqueror of Shamballa | Japan | Seiji Mizushima | Bones | Film sequel to the 2003 series Fullmetal Alchemist | Traditional |
| 2005 | Lil' Pimp | United States | Mark Brooks; Peter Gilstrap | | | Flash |
| 2005 | The Book of the Dead | Japan | Kihachirō Kawamoto | Sakura Motion Picture Co., Ltd. | | Stop-motion |
| 2005 | Lunacy | Czech Republic; Slovakia | Jan Švankmajer | Warner Bros. | Based on The System of Doctor Tarr and Professor Fether and The Premature Burial by Edgar Allan Poe | Stop-motion; Live-action |
| 2005 | Nagasaki 1945: The Angelus Bells | Japan | Seiji Arihara | Mushi Production | | Traditional |
| 2005 | Naruto the Movie: Legend of the Stone of Gelel | Japan | Hirotsugu Kawasaki | Studio Pierrot | Based on Naruto by Masashi Kishimoto | Traditional |
| 2005 | One Piece: Baron Omatsuri and the Secret Island | Japan | Mamoru Hosoda | Toei Animation; Toei Company | Based on One Piece by Eiichiro Oda | Traditional |
| 2005 | Tsubasa Reservoir Chronicle the Movie: The Princess in the Birdcage Kingdom | Japan | Itsuro Kawasaki | Production I.G | | Traditional |
| 2005 | Stewie Griffin: The Untold Story | United States | Pete Michels | Fuzzy Door Productions; 20th Century Fox Home Entertainment | | Traditional |
| 2005 | xxxHolic: A Midsummer Night's Dream | Japan | Tsutomu Mizushima | Production I.G | | Traditional |
| 2006 | 2 in the AM PM | United States | J. G. Quintel | California Institute of the Arts; Net Hat Co. | | Traditional |
| 2006 | Marvel Animated Features | United States | Jamie Simone | MLG Productions | | Traditional |
| 2006 | Aachi & Ssipak | South Korea | Jo Beom-jin | JTeam Studios | | Traditional |
| 2006 | Bleach: Memories of Nobody | Japan | Noriyuki Abe | Pierrot | | Traditional |
| 2006 | Blood Tea and Red String | United States | Christiane Cegavske | | | Stop-motion |
| 2006 | The Girl Who Leapt Through Time | Japan | Mamoru Hosoda | Madhouse | | Traditional |
| 2006 | Hellboy: Sword of Storms | United States | Phil Weinstein; Tad Stones | Film Roman | Part of the Hellboy Animated film series. | Traditional |
| 2006 | Live Freaky! Die Freaky! | United States | John Roecker | Hellcat Films | | Stop-motion |
| 2006 | Princess | Denmark; Germany | Anders Morgenthaler | Det Danske Filminstitut; Nordisk Film; Tartan Films | | Traditional |
| 2006 | Prince Vladimir | Russia | Yuriy Kulakov | Solnechniy Dom – DM | | Traditional |
| 2006 | Queer Duck: The Movie | United States | Xeth Feinberg | Disgrace Films; Icebox 2.0 | | Flash |
| 2006 | Fimfárum 2 | Czech Republic | Vlasta Pospíšilová, Břetislav Pojar, Aurel Klimt, Jan Balej | Ceská Televize, Krátký Film Praha, MAUR Film, Samuelson | | Stop-motion |
| 2006 | Dieter: Der Film | Germany | Michael Schaack, Toby Genkel | Universum Film | | Traditional |
| 2006 | The Little Bastard and the Old Fart: Death Sucks | Germany | Michael Schaack, Konrad Weise | Senator Film Produktion, TFC Trickompany Filmproduktion | | Traditional |
| 2006 | Renaissance | France | Christian Volckman | Pathé | | CGI |
| 2006 | U | France | Serge Élissalde, Grégoire Solotareff | Prima Linea Productions | | Traditional |
| 2006 | Tales from Earthsea | Japan | Gorō Miyazaki | Studio Ghibli | | Traditional |
| 2006 | Naruto the Movie: Guardians of the Crescent Moon Kingdom | Japan | Toshiyuki Tsuru | Studio Pierrot | Based on Naruto by Masashi Kishimoto | Traditional |
| 2006 | Origin: Spirits of the Past | Japan | Keiichi Sugiyama | Gonzo | | Traditional |
| 2006 | Paprika | Japan | Satoshi Kon | Madhouse | The last film directed by Satoshi Kon before his death in 2010. | Traditional |
| 2006 | A Scanner Darkly | United States | Richard Linklater | Thousand Words; Section Eight; Detour Filmproduction; 3 Arts Entertainment | | Rotoscoping |
| 2006 | Tekkonkinkreet | Japan | Michael Arias | Studio 4°C | | Traditional |
| 2006 | Wood & Stock: Sexo, Oregano e Rock'n'Roll | Brazil | Otto Guerra | Otto Desenhos Animados | | Traditional |
| 2006 | Free Jimmy | Norway | Christopher Nielsen | | | CGI |
| 2007 | One Night in One City | Czech Republic | Jan Balej | HAFAN film MAUR film | | Stop-motion |
| 2007 | Snow White: The Sequel | United Kingdom; Belgium; France | Picha | | Based on the fairy tale of the same name | Traditional |
| 2007 | Film Noir | Serbia | D. Jud Jones; Risto Topaloski | EasyE Films | | CGI |
| 2007 | Mosaic | United States | Roy Allen Smith | POW! Entertainment, Film Roman, Manga Entertainment | | Traditional |
| 2007 | Chicago 10: Speak Your Peace | United States | Brett Morgen | Consolidated Documentaries, Participant Productions, River Road Entertainment, Curious Pictures | | Traditional |
| 2007 | Dante's Inferno | United States | Sean Meredith | Dante Film LLC | | Hand-drawn paper puppets |
| 2007 | We Are the Strange | United States | M dot Strange | | | Stop-motion/CGI |
| 2007 | Aqua Teen Hunger Force Colon Movie Film for Theaters | United States | Matt Maiellaro; Dave Willis | Radical Axis; Williams Street; Adult Swim | | Flash; Traditional; CGI |
| 2007 | Noah's Ark | Argentina; Italy | Juan Pablo Buscarini | Patagonik Film Group; Buena Vista International | | Traditional |
| 2007 | Princess of the Sun | Belgium, France, Hungary | Philippe Leclerc | | | Traditional |
| 2007 | Appleseed Ex Machina | Japan | Shinji Aramaki | Micott & Basara; Digital Frontier | | CGI |
| 2007 | Beowulf | United States | Robert Zemeckis | ImageMovers | | CGI; Motion capture |
| 2007 | Battle for Terra | United States | Aristomenis Tsirbas | IM Global, Snoot Toons | | CGI |
| 2007 | Bleach: The DiamondDust Rebellion | Japan | Noriyuki Abe | Pierrot | | Traditional |
| 2007 | Evangelion: 1.0 You Are (Not) Alone | Japan | Masayuki; Kazuya Tsurumaki | Studio Khara | | Traditional |
| 2007 | Genius Party | Japan | | Studio 4°C | | Traditional |
| 2007 | Sword of the Stranger | Japan | Masahiro Andō | Bones | | Traditional |
| 2007 | Fear(s) of the Dark | France | Blutch and Various | Diaphana Films | | Traditional |
| 2007 | Futurama: Bender's Big Score | United States | Dwayne Carey-Hill | The Curiosity Company; 20th Century Fox | Part of four direct-to-DVD films based on the animated series Futurama. | Traditional |
| 2007 | Hellboy: Blood and Iron | United States | Victor Cook; Tad Stones | Film Roman | Part of the Hellboy Animated film series. | Traditional |
| 2007 | Highlander: The Search for Vengeance | United States; Japan | Yoshiaki Kawajiri; Hiroshi Hamasaki | Madhouse; Imagi Animation Studios | An anime instalment of the cult Highlander franchise. | Traditional |
| 2007 | JoJo's Bizarre Adventure: Phantom Blood | Japan | Jūnichi Hayama | A.P.P.P. | | Traditional |
| 2007 | Naruto Shippuden: The Movie | Japan | Hajime Kamegaki | Studio Pierrot | Based on Naruto by Masashi Kishimoto | Traditional |
| 2007 | One Piece Movie: The Desert Princess and the Pirates: Adventures in Alabasta | Japan | Takahiro Imamura | Toei Animation; Fuji Television; Shueisha; Bandai Entertainment; Toei Company | Based on One Piece by Eiichiro Oda | Traditional |
| 2007 | The Simpsons Movie | United States | David Silverman | 20th Century Fox; 20th Century Fox Animation; Gracie Films | | Traditional |
| 2007 | Summer Days with Coo | Japan | Keiichi Hara | Shin-Ei Animation | | Traditional |
| 2007 | Superman: Doomsday | United States | Bruce Timm; Lauren Montgomery; Brandon Vietti | Warner Premiere; DC Comics; Warner Bros. Animation | | Traditional |
| 2007 | Persepolis | France | Marjane Satrapi; Vincent Paronnaud | Celluloid Dreams; CNC; France 3 Cinéma; The Kennedy/Marshall Company; Région Ile-de-France | | Traditional |
| 2007 | Tengers | South Africa | Michael J. Rix | Filmhub | | Claymation |
| 2007 | Year of the Fish | United States | David Kaplan | Funny Cry Happy | | Rotoscope |
| 2007 | Elf Bowling the Movie: The Great North Pole Elf Strike | United States | Dave Kim, Rex Piano | Film Brokers International, Great Highway Company | | CGI |
| 2007 | Race | United States | Robert Brousseau | Phase 4 Films | | CGI |
| 2007 | Lissi and the Wild Emperor | Germany | Michael Herbig | CA Scanline Production, herbX film | | CGI |
| 2007 | RH+, The Vampire of Seville | Spain | Antonio Zurera | M5 Audiovisual, Milimetros Feature Animation | | Traditional |
| 2007 | Cat City 2: The Cat of Satan | Hungary | Béla Ternovszky | | | Traditional |
| 2008 | Chilly Beach: The World is Hot Enough | Canada | Eden Ibric | March Entertainment | | Flash |
| 2008 | Sita Sings the Blues | United States | Nina Paley | | | Flash |
| 2008 | 31 minutos, la película | Chile, Brazil | Álvaro Díaz, Pedro Peirano | Aplaplac, MGP Filmes, Total Entertainment LG, User T-38 | | Puppetry |
| 2008 | Batman: Gotham Knight | United States; Japan | Shōjirō Nishimi (#1); Futoshi Higashide (#2); Hiroshi Morioka (#3); Yasuhiro Aoki (#4); Toshiyuki Kubooka (#5); Jong-Sik Nam (#6); Yoshiaki Kawajiri (#6, uncredited) | Warner Premiere; DC Comics; Warner Bros. Animation; Studio 4°C (#1, 5); Production I.G (#2); Bee Train Production (#3); Madhouse (#4, 6) | Prequel to The Dark Knight | Traditional |
| 2008 | Bleach: Fade to Black | Japan | Noriyuki Abe | Pierrot | | Traditional |
| 2008 | Idiots and Angels | United States | Bill Plympton | Plymptoons | | Traditional |
| 2008 | The Garden of Sinners: Remaining Sense of Pain | Japan | Mitsuru Obunai | Ufotable; Aniplex | Based on the manga of the same name | Traditional |
| 2008 | $9.99 | Israel; Australia | Tatia Rosenthal | | | Stop-motion |
| 2008 | From Inside | United States | John Bergin | KC Grinder Productions | | Traditional |
| 2008 | Goat Story | Czech Republic | Jan Tománek | Art And Animation studio Visions in Technology; D production Ceská Televise | First Czech CGI feature. | CGI |
| 2008 | Dead Space: Downfall | United States | Chuck Patton | Film Roman; Electronic Arts | Animated film prequel to the video game Dead Space. | Traditional |
| 2008 | Justice League: The New Frontier | United States | Dave Bullock | Warner Premiere; DC Comics; Warner Bros. Animation | Direct-to-video | Traditional |
| 2008 | Edison and Leo | Canada | Neil Burns | TVA Films | | Stop-motion |
| 2008 | The Sky Crawlers | Japan | Mamoru Oshii | Production I.G; Warner Bros. Pictures | | Traditional |
| 2008 | Futurama: Bender's Game | United States | Dwayne Carey-Hill | The Curiosity Company; 20th Century Fox | Part of four direct-to-DVD films based on the animated series Futurama. | Traditional |
| 2008 | Futurama: The Beast with a Billion Backs | United States | Peter Avanzino | The Curiosity Company; 20th Century Fox | Part of four direct-to-DVD films based on the animated series Futurama. | Traditional |
| 2008 | Dead Fury | United States | Frank Sudol | BlackArro Productions | | Traditional |
| 2008 | Kite Liberator | Japan | Yasuomi Umetsu | ARMS | | Traditional |
| 2008 | Lupin III: Green vs. Red | Japan | Shigeyuki Miya | TMS Entertainment | | Traditional |
| 2008 | Genius Party Beyond | Japan | Mahiro Maeda, Kôji Morimoto, Kazuto Nakazawa, Shin'ya Ôhira, Tatsuyuki Tanaka | Studio 4°C | | Traditional |
| 2008 | Naruto Shippuden the Movie: Bonds | Japan | Hajime Kamegaki | Studio Pierrot | Based on Naruto by Masashi Kishimoto | Traditional |
| 2008 | Resident Evil: Degeneration | Japan; United States | Makoto Kamiya | Capcom; Digital Frontier | Set in the Resident Evil video game universe. | CGI |
| 2008 | Imaginationland: The Movie (South Park) | United States | Trey Parker | South Park Digital Studios | Direct-to-video | CGI |
| 2008 | Journey to Saturn | Denmark | Thorbjørn Christoffersen; Craig Frank | A. Film A/S; TV2 Denmark | | CGI |
| 2008 | Immigrants | Hungary; United States | Gábor Csupó | Klasky Csupo | | Traditional |
| 2008 | Tripping the Rift: The Movie | Canada | | CineGroupe; Film Roman | | CGI |
| 2008 | Waltz with Bashir | Israel; Germany; France | Ari Folman | Bridgit Folman Film Gang; Les Films d'Ici; Razor Film Produktion | First animated film nominated for Academy Award for Best Foreign Language Film. | Traditional; Flash |
| 2008 | Los Campeones de la Lucha Libre | United States | Eddie Mort | Fwak! Animation, Azteca Cine | | Flash |
| 2008 | The Toe Tactic | United States | Emily Hubley | Orchard Pictures, Hubbub, Hermetic Pictures | | Live-action/Traditional |
| 2008 | Turok: Son of Stone | United States | Curt Geda; Dan Riba; Frank Squillace; Tad Stones | Classic Media; Film Roman; Starz Media | Animated feature film based on the comic book character Turok | Traditional |
| 2008 | The Tale of Soldier Fedot, The Daring Fellow | Russia | Ludmila Steblyanko | Melnitsa Animation Studios; CTB Film Company; Channel One Russia | | Flash |
| 2008 | Dragonlance: Dragons of Autumn Twilight | United States | Will Meugniot | Toonz Animation; Commotion Pictures; Epic Level Entertainment | Based on the Dragonlance campaign setting of the Dungeons & Dragons role-playing game. | Traditional; CGI |
| 2009 | My Dog Tulip | United States | Paul Fierlinger | Axiom Films; New Yorker Films | | Traditional |
| 2009 | 9 | United States | Shane Acker | Focus Features; Bazelevs Company; Relativity Media; Starz Animation; Tim Burton Productions | Based on Acker's 2005 animated short of the same name | CGI |
| 2009 | Afro Samurai: Resurrection | Japan | Fuminori Kizaki | Gonzo | | Traditional |
| 2009 | Belowars | Brazil | Paulo Munhoz | Tecnokena | | Flash/Traditional |
| 2009 | Boogie | Argentina | Gustavo Cova | Illusion Studios; Proceso | | Flash |
| 2009 | Fantastic Mr. Fox | United States | Wes Anderson | 20th Century Fox Animation; Indian Paintbrush; Regency Enterprises; American Empirical Pictures; 3 Mills Studios | | Stop-motion |
| 2009 | Wonder Woman | United States | Lauren Montgomery | Warner Premiere; DC Comics; Warner Bros. Animation | Direct-to-video | Traditional |
| 2009 | Green Lantern: First Flight | United States | Lauren Montgomery | Warner Premiere; DC Comics; Warner Bros. Animation; Telecom Animation Film | Direct-to-video | Traditional |
| 2009 | Superman/Batman: Public Enemies | United States | Sam Liu | Warner Premiere; DC Entertainment; Warner Bros. Animation; Lotto Animation | Direct-to-video | Traditional |
| 2009 | Evangelion: 2.0 You Can (Not) Advance | Japan | Masayuki; Kazuya Tsurumaki | Studio Khara | | Traditional |
| 2009 | Futurama: Into the Wild Green Yonder | United States | Peter Avanzino | The Curiosity Company; 20th Century Fox | Part of four direct-to-DVD films based on the animated series Futurama. | Traditional |
| 2009 | The Garden of Sinners: A Study in Murder - Part 2 | Japan | Shinsuke Takizawa | Ufotable; Aniplex | Based on the manga of the same name | Traditional |
| 2009 | The Haunted World of El Superbeasto | United States | Rob Zombie | Film Roman | | Traditional |
| 2009 | Killer Bean Forever | United States | Jeff Lew | Killer Bean Studios | | CGI |
| 2009 | Mary and Max | Australia | Adam Elliot | Melodrama Pictures | | Stop-motion |
| 2009 | Metropia | Sweden; Denmark; Norway | Tarik Saleh | Atmo Media Network; Boulder Media Limited; Sandrew Metronome | | CGI |
| 2009 | Lascars | France; Germany | Emmanuel Klotz; Albert Pereira-Lazaro | Canal Plus; France 2 | | Traditional |
| 2009 | Naruto Shippuden the Movie: The Will of Fire | Japan | Masahiko Murata | Studio Pierrot | Based on Naruto by Masashi Kishimoto | Traditional |
| 2009 | One Piece Film: Strong World | Japan | Munehisa Sakai | Toei Animation; Toei Company | Based on One Piece by Eiichiro Oda | Traditional |
| 2009 | Redline | Japan | Takeshi Koike | Madhouse | | Traditional |
| 2009 | Summer Wars | Japan | Mamoru Hosoda | Madhouse | | Traditional |
| 2009 | Tales of Vesperia: The First Strike | Japan | Kanta Kamei | Production I.G. | Prequel to the 2008 video game Tales of Vesperia | Traditional |
| 2009 | Technotise: Edit & I | Serbia | Aleksa Gajić | Black White 'N' Green | | Flash/CGI |
| 2009 | Masha and the Magic Nut | Russia | Egor Konchalovskiy | Amedia, Gala-Film | | CGI |
| 2009 | Bye-Bye Bin Laden | United States | Scott Sublett | San Jose State University | | Traditional |
| 2009 | The Romantic | United States | Michael Heneghan | The Triumphant School of the Apocalyptic Love | | Traditional |
| 2009 | The Story of Mr. Sorry | South Korea | Kwak In-Keun, Il-hyun Kim, Eun Mi-lee, Lee Hae-young, Ji-na Ryu | CJ Entertainment | | Traditional |
| 2009 | First Squad | Japan/Russia | Yoshiharu Ashino | Studio 4°C, Molot Entertainment Film Company | | Traditional |
| 2009 | Włatcy móch: Ćmoki, czopki i mondzioły | Poland | Bartosz Kędzierski | | | |

== 2010s ==
| Year | Title | Country | Director | Studio | Notes | Animation technique |
|---|---|---|---|---|---|---|
| 2010 | Chico and Rita | United Kingdom; Spain | Fernando Trueba; Javier Mariscal; Tono Errando | Fernando Trueba PC; Estudio Mariscal; Magic Light Pictures | | Traditional |
| 2010 | Colorful | Japan | Keiichi Hara | Sunrise | | Traditional |
| 2010 | Dante's Inferno: An Animated Epic | United States; Japan; South Korea | Mike Disa | Film Roman; Production I.G | Animated feature film based on the Dante's Inferno video game. | Traditional |
| 2010 | The Drawn Together Movie: The Movie! | United States | Greg Franklin | Comedy Central Films; Double Hemm; Six Point Harness; Paramount Pictures | | Flash |
| 2010 | Godkiller: Walk Among Us | United States | Matt Pizzolo | Warner Bros. Warner Music Group; Rykodisc; Gravitas Ventures; Halo 8 Entertainment | Illustrated film based on the comic books. | Flash/CGI |
| 2010 | Halo Legends | Japan; United States; Germany | Frank O'Connor; Joseph Chou | Studio 4°C; Production I.G; Casio Entertainment; Toei Animation; Bones; Bee Train; Warner Bros. 343 Industries | Collection of seven short films set in the Halo science fiction universe. | Traditional; CGI |
| 2010 | Kayıp Armağan | Turkey | Kerem S. Hünal | Sobee Studios | | Flash/Traditional |
| 2010 | Justice League: Crisis on Two Earths | United States | Sam Liu; Lauren Montgomery | Warner Bros. Animation; Warner Premiere; DC Entertainment | | Traditional |
| 2010 | Superman/Batman: Apocalypse | United States | Lauren Montgomery | Warner Bros. Animation; Warner Premiere; DC Entertainment; MOI Animation | | Traditional |
| 2010 | The Illusionist | France; United Kingdom | Sylvain Chomet | Pathé, Django Films | | Traditional |
| 2010 | Piercing I | China | Liu Jian | | | Traditional |
| 2010 | Planzet | Japan | Jun Awazu | CoMix Wave | | CGI |
| 2010 | A Cat in Paris | France, Switzerland, Netherlands, Belgium | Alain Gagnol, Jean-Loup Felicioli | Folimage | | Traditional |
| 2010 | Surviving Life | Poland | Jan Švankmajer | Athanor; C-GA Film | | Live-action/Cutout |
| 2010 | Mars | United States | Geoff Marslett | Cinema Lapiniere, Film Science, Marsnaut Films | | Rotoscope |
| 2010 | Batman: Under the Red Hood | United States | Brandon Vietti | Warner Premiere; Warner Bros. Animation; DC Entertainment | | Traditional |
| 2010 | Bleach: Hell Verse | Japan | Noriyuki Abe | Pierrot | | Traditional |
| 2010 | Book Girl | Japan | Shunsuke Tada | Production I.G | | Traditional |
| 2010 | Loups=Garous | Japan | Junichi Fujisaku | Production I.G, TransArts | | Traditional |
| 2010 | King of Thorn | Japan | Kazuyoshi Katayama | Kadokawa Pictures | | Traditional |
| 2010 | Naruto Shippuden the Movie: The Lost Tower | Japan | Masahiko Murata | Studio Pierrot | Based on Naruto by Masashi Kishimoto | Traditional |
| 2010 | Trigun: Badlands Rumble | Japan | Satoshi Nishimura | Madhouse | | Traditional |
| 2010 | Jackboots on Whitehall | United Kingdom | McHenry Brothers | Vertigo Films; Matador Pictures; Entertainment Motion Pictures; McHenry Pictures | | Puppets; Stop-motion |
| 2010 | Ultramarines: A Warhammer 40,000 Movie | United Kingdom | Martyn Pick | Good Story Productions; Codex Pictures; POP6 | Set in Games Workshop's fictional Warhammer 40,000 universe. | CGI |
| 2011 | George the Hedgehog | Poland | Wojciech Wawszczyk; Jakub Tarkowski; Tomasz Lew Leśniak | Monolith Films | | Flash |
| 2011 | Rango | United States | Gore Verbinski | Nickelodeon Movies / Blind Wink / GK Films / Paramount Pictures | | CGI |
| 2011 | All-Star Superman | United States | Sam Liu | Warner Bros. Animation; Warner Premiere; DC Entertainment | | Traditional |
| 2011 | Green Lantern: Emerald Knights | United States | Christopher Berkeley; Lauren Montgomery; Jay Oliva | Warner Bros. Animation; Warner Premiere; DC Entertainment | | Traditional |
| 2011 | Marx Reloaded | Germany | Jason Barker | Films Noirs / Arte | | Traditional |
| 2011 | The King of Pigs | South Korea | Yeon Sang-ho | Studio Dadashow; KT&G Sangsangmadang | | Traditional |
| 2011 | The Rabbi's Cat | France | Joann Sfar; Antoine Delesvaux | Autochenille Production | | Traditional |
| 2011 | Ronal the Barbarian | Denmark | Kresten Vestbjerg Andersen; Thorbjørn Christoffersen; Philip Einstein Lipski | Det Danske Filminstitut; Einstein Film; Nordisk Film; TV2 Danmark | | CGI |
| 2011 | Appleseed XIII: Ouranos | Japan | Takayuki Hamana | Production I.G | | CGI |
| 2011 | Appleseed XIII: Tartaros | Japan | Takayuki Hamana | Production I.G | | CGI |
| 2011 | Batman: Year One | United States | Sam Liu; Lauren Montgomery | DC Entertainment; Warner Bros. Animation | | Traditional |
| 2011 | Children Who Chase Lost Voices | Japan | Makoto Shinkai | CoMix Wave Films | | Traditional |
| 2011 | Dead Space: Aftermath | United States | Mike Disa | Film Roman; Electronic Arts | Animated film that bridges the story between the first Dead Space video game and the sequel, Dead Space 2. | Traditional |
| 2011 | Fullmetal Alchemist: The Sacred Star of Milos | Japan | Kazuya Murata | Bones | | Traditional |
| 2011 | Heaven's Lost Property the Movie: The Angeloid of Clockwork | Japan | Tetsuya Yanagisawa | AIC | | Traditional |
| 2011 | Buddha: The Great Departure | Japan | Kozo Morishita | Toei Animation / Warner Bros. | | Traditional |
| 2011 | Legend of the Millennium Dragon | Japan | Hirotsugu Kawasaki | Studio Pierrot | | Traditional |
| 2011 | Leafie, A Hen into the Wild | South Korea | Oh Sung-yoon | Lotte Entertainment; Myung Films | | Traditional; CGI |
| 2011 | Naruto the Movie: Blood Prison | Japan | Masahiko Murata | Studio Pierrot | Based on Naruto by Masashi Kishimoto | Traditional |
| 2011 | Underworld: Endless War | United States | Juno John Lee | Lakeshore Entertainment; Titmouse, Inc. | Set in the universe of the Underworld films. | Traditional |
| 2011 | Werner – Eiskalt! | Germany | Rötger Feldmann; Thomas Platt; Herman Weigel; Gernot Roll | Trickompany Filmproduktion; Constantin Film | Based on Werner by Rötger Feldmann | Traditional |
| 2011 | Tekken: Blood Vengeance | Japan | Yōichi Mōri | Digital Frontier; Bandai Namco Games; Namco Pictures; Asmik Ace Entertainment | Based on the Tekken video game series | CGI |
| 2011 | Alois Nebel | Czech Republic; Germany | Tomáš Luňák | Negativ | | Traditional |
| 2011 | Wrinkles | Spain | Ignacio Ferreras | Perro Verde Films | | Traditional |
| 2011 | The Tragedy of Man | Hungary | Marcell Jankovics | Magyar Rajzfilm | | Traditional |
| 2011 | Crulic: The Path to Beyond | Romania; Poland | | | | Mixed |
| 2011 | The Green Wave | Germany | Ali Samadi Ahadi | Arte | | Traditional |
| 2011 | Tatsumi | Singapore | Eric Khoo | Zhao Wei Films | | Traditional |
| 2011 | The Princess and the Pilot | Japan | Jun Shishido | Madhouse / TMS Entertainment | | Traditional |
| 2011 | Fimfárum – Do třetice všeho dobrého | Czech Republic | Vlasta Pospíšilová, Kristina Dufková, David Súkup | MAUR Film | | Stop motion |
| 2011 | The Painting | Belgium, France | Jean-François Laguionie | Be-Films, Blue Spirit Animation, uFilm | | CGI/Traditional |
| 2011 | The Prodigies | France, Luxembourg, Belgium | Antoine Charreyron | Fidélité Films, Onyx Films, Studio 37 | | CGI |
| 2012 | Batman: The Dark Knight Returns Part One | United States | Jay Oliva | DC Entertainment; Warner Bros. Animation | | Traditional |
| 2012 | The Apostle | Spain | Fernando Cortizo | Artefact Productions | | Stop-motion |
| 2012 | An Oversimplification of Her Beauty | United States | Terence Nance | | | Mixed |
| 2012 | Heart String Marionette | United States | M dot Strange | | | CGI |
| 2012 | Approved for Adoption | France, Belgium, South Korea, Switzerland | Laurent Boileau, Jung | Artémis Productions, Mosaïque Films | | CGI/Traditional |
| 2012 | Arjun: The Warrior Prince | India | Arnab Chaudhuri | UTV Motion Pictures | | CGI/Traditional |
| 2012 | Evangelion: 3.0 You Can (Not) Redo | Japan | Hideaki Anno (chief); Mahiro Maeda; Kazuya Tsurumaki | Studio Khara | | Traditional |
| 2012 | Dragon Age: Dawn of the Seeker | Japan | Fumihiko Sori | BioWare; Electronic Arts; Funimation | Set in the Dragon Age universe. | CGI |
| 2012 | Gothicmade | Japan | Mamoru Nagano | | | Traditional |
| 2012 | El Santos vs. La Tetona Mendoza | Mexico | Alejandro Lozano; Andrés Couturier | Videocine; Átomo Films; Peyote Films | | Traditional |
| 2012 | Fat, Bald, Short Man | Colombia | Carlos Osuna | Malta Cine; Ciné-Sud Promotion; Perfect Circle Productions | | Rotoscoping |
| 2012 | Justice League: Doom | United States | Lauren Montgomery | DC Entertainment; Warner Bros. Animation | | Traditional |
| 2012 | Superman vs. The Elite | United States | Michael Chang | Warner Premiere; DC Entertainment; Warner Bros. Animation | | Traditional |
| 2012 | Mass Effect: Paragon Lost | United States; Japan | Atsushi Takeuchi | Production I.G. BioWare | Set in the Mass Effect universe during the events of the second instalment Mass Effect 2. | Traditional |
| 2012 | Road to Ninja: Naruto the Movie | Japan | Hayato Date | Studio Pierrot | Based on Naruto by Masashi Kishimoto | Traditional |
| 2012 | Puella Magi Madoka Magica: Beginnings | Japan | Akiyuki Shinbo; Yukihiro Miyamoto; Hiroyuki Terao | Shaft | | Traditional |
| 2012 | Puella Magi Madoka Magica: Eternal | Japan | Akiyuki Shinbo; Yukihiro Miyamoto; Hiroyuki Terao | Shaft | | Traditional |
| 2012 | One Piece Film: Z | Japan | Tatsuya Nagamine | Toei Animation; Toei Company | Based on One Piece by Eiichiro Oda | Traditional |
| 2012 | Resident Evil: Damnation | Japan | Makoto Kamiya | Capcom; Digital Frontier | Set in the Resident Evil video game universe. | CGI |
| 2012 | Wolf Children | Japan | Mamoru Hosoda | Studio Chizu | | Traditional |
| 2012 | Swimming to Sea | South Korea | Lee Dae-Hee | CJ Entertainment | | CGI |
| 2012 | Where the Dead Go to Die | United States | Jimmy ScreamerClauz | Chainsaw Kiss; Draconian Films | | CGI |
| 2012 | Goat Story 2 | Czech Republic | Jan Tománek | Art And Animation studio | | CGI |
| 2012 | The Amazing Bulk | United States | Lewis Schoenbrun | Laybl Productions | | CGI |
| 2012 | The Suicide Shop Le Magasin des suicides | France; Canada; Belgium | Patrice Leconte | ARP Sélection | | Traditional/Flash |
| 2012 | Starship Troopers: Invasion | Japan; US | Shinji Aramaki | Stage 6 Films; Sola Digital Arts; Lucent Pictures | Part of the Starship Troopers film series. | CGI |
| 2012 | It's Such a Beautiful Day | United States | Don Hertzfeldt | Bitter Films | | Traditional |
| 2012 | Strange Frame | United States | G.B. Hajim | Wolfe Releasing | | Cutout |
| 2012 | The Life of Budori Gusuko | Japan | Gisaburō Sugii | Tezuka Productions | | Traditional |
| 2012 | War of the Worlds: Goliath | United States, Malaysia | Bill Jones, Ben Timlett, Jeff Simpson | Bill and Ben Productions | | CGI/Traditional/Cutout |
| 2012 | Asura | Japan | Keiichi Sato | Toei Animation | | CGI/Traditional |
| 2012 | Psychic School Wars | Japan | Ryosuke Nakamura | Sunrise | | Traditional |
| 2012 | A Liar's Autobiography: The Untrue Story of Monty Python's Graham Chapman | United Kingdom | Joe Pearson | Tripod Entertainment | | CGI/Traditional |
| 2012 | Fuse Teppō Musume no Torimonochō | Japan | Masayuki Miyaji | | | Traditional |
| 2012 | 009 Re:Cyborg | Japan | Kenji Kamiyama | Production I.G | | CGI |
| 2012 | Kirikou and the Men and Women | France | Michel Ocelot | Les Armateurs; Mac Guff Ligne; France 3 Cinéma; Studio O StudioCanal | | CGI |
| 2012 | Consuming Spirits | United States | Chris Sullivan | | | Traditional |
| 2013 | Batman: The Dark Knight Returns Part Two | United States | Jay Oliva | DC Entertainment; Warner Bros. Animation | | Traditional |
| 2013 | Cheech & Chong's Animated Movie | United States | Branden Chambers; Eric D. Chambers | Houston Curtis Productions; Chamber Bros. Entertainment; 20th Century Studios | | Flash |
| 2013 | Justice League: The Flashpoint Paradox | United States | Jay Oliva | Warner Premiere; DC Entertainment; Warner Bros. Animation; Studio 4 °C | Direct-to-DVD | Traditional |
| 2013 | Puella Magi Madoka Magica: Rebellion | Japan | Akiyuki Shinbo; Yukihiro Miyamoto; Hiroyuki Terao | Shaft | | Traditional |
| 2013 | The Art of Happiness | Italy | Alessandro Rak | Big Sur; Mad Entertainment; Mai Cinema | | Traditional |
| 2013 | Bayonetta: Bloody Fate | Japan | Fuminori Kizaki | Gonzo | Based on the 2009 video game Bayonetta | Traditional |
| 2013 | Dick Figures: The Movie | United States | Ed Skudder; Zack Keller | Mondo Media; Remochoso; Six Point Harness | | Flash |
| 2013 | Superman: Unbound | United States | James Tucker | Warner Bros. Animation; Warner Premiere; DC Entertainment | | Traditional |
| 2013 | Lisa Limone ja Maroc Orange: tormakas armulugu | Estonia | Mait Laas | Nukufilm | | Stop-motion |
| 2013 | Silver Circle | United States | Pasha Roberts | Lineplot Productions | | CGI |
| 2013 | Dragon Ball Z: Battle of Gods | Japan | Masahiro Hosoda | Toei Animation | Based on Dragon Ball by Akira Toriyama | Traditional |
| 2013 | The Fake | South Korea | Yeon Sang-ho | Studio Dadashow | | Traditional |
| 2013 | Hunter × Hunter: The Last Mission | Japan | Keiichiro Kawaguchi | Madhouse | | Traditional |
| 2013 | Hunter × Hunter: Phantom Rouge | Japan | Yuzo Sato | Madhouse | | Traditional |
| 2013 | Savita Bhabhi | India | Puneet Agarwal | Unknown | Based on the Savita Bhabhi comic book | |
| 2013 | Iron Man: Rise of Technovore | Japan | Hiroshi Hamasaki | Madhouse | | Traditional |
| 2013 | Jay & Silent Bob's Super Groovy Cartoon Movie | United States | Steve Stark | SModcast Pictures; Phase 4 Films | | Flash |
| 2013 | The Congress | France, Israel, Belgium, Poland, Luxembourg, Germany | Ari Folman | Pandora Filmproduktion, ARP Sélection (France), Cinéart (Belgium/Luxembourg), Pandora Film Verleih (Germany), Gutek Film (Poland) | | Traditional/Live-action |
| 2013 | The Garden of Words | Japan | Makoto Shinkai | CoMix Wave Films | | Traditional |
| 2013 | Saint Young Men | Japan | Noriko Takao | A-1 Pictures | | Traditional |
| 2013 | Iron Man & Hulk: Heroes United | United States | Eric Radomski, Leo Riley | Marvel Animation, Brain Zoo Studios | | CGI |
| 2013 | Hal | Japan | Ryōtarō Makihara | Pony Canyon, Production I.G., Wit Studio, Shochiku | | Traditional |
| 2013 | Aya of Yop City | France | Marguerite Abouet, Clement Oubrerie | Autochenille Production | | Traditional/Flash |
| 2013 | Aura: Koga Maryuin's Last War | Japan | Seiji Kishi | AIC | | Traditional |
| 2013 | Rio 2096: A Story of Love and Fury | Brazil | Luiz Bolognesi | Buriti Filmes; Gullane | | Traditional |
| 2013 | Short Peace | Japan | Shuhei Morita; Katsuhiro Otomo; Hiroaki Ando; Hajime Katoki | Sunrise | The film is a multimedia project composed of four short anime films produced by Sunrise and Shochiku. | Traditional |
| 2013 | Space Pirate Captain Harlock | Japan | Shinji Aramaki | Toei Animation | | CGI |
| 2013 | The Wind Rises | Japan | Hayao Miyazaki | Studio Ghibli | | Traditional |
| 2013 | Asphalt Watches | Canada | Shayne Ehman; Seth Scriver | | | Flash |
| 2013 | Cheatin' | United States | Bill Plympton | Plymptoons | | Traditional |
| 2014 | Appleseed Alpha | Japan; US | Shinji Aramaki; Steven Foster | Sola Digital Arts | | CGI |
| 2014 | Achmed Saves America | United States | Frank Marino | Bento Box Entertainment, LEG | | Traditional |
| 2014 | Buddha 2: Tezuka Osamu no Buddha ~Owarinaki Tabi~ | Japan | Toshiaki Komura | Toei Animation, Tezuka Productions | | Traditional |
| 2014 | Dragon Nest: Warriors' Dawn | China; United States | Song Yuefeng | Mili Pictures | | CGI |
| 2014 | Possessed | Spain | Samuel Ortí Martí | Basque Films, Conflictivos Productions | | Stop-motion |
| 2014 | One Hundred Thousand Bad Jokes | China | Lu Hengyu, Li Shujie | Wanda Media, Shanghai Toonmax Media, Paramount Pictures, Nickelodeon Movies, Tencent Pictures, U-17, Spin Master Entertainment | | Flash |
| 2014 | Justice League: War | United States | Jay Olivia | Warner Bros. Animation; DC Entertainment; MOI Animation | | Traditional |
| 2014 | Son of Batman | United States | Ethan Spaulding | Warner Bros. Animation; DC Entertainment; The Answer Studio | | Traditional |
| 2014 | Batman: Assault on Arkham | United States | Jay Olivia; Ethan Spaulding | Warner Bros. Animation; DC Entertainment; MOI Animation | | Traditional |
| 2014 | Iron Man & Captain America: Heroes United | United States | Leo Riley | Marvel Animation | | CGI |
| 2014 | Até que a Sbórnia nos Separe | Brazil | Otto Guerra; Ennio Torresan Jr | Otto Desenhos Animados | | Traditional |
| 2014 | Avengers Confidential: Black Widow & Punisher | Japan | Kenichi Shimizu | Madhouse | | Traditional |
| 2014 | Expelled from Paradise | Japan | Seiji Mizushima | Toei Animation | | Traditional |
| 2014 | Heavenly Sword | United States | Gun Ho Jung | Blockade Entertainment | Based on the 2007 video game of the same name | CGI |
| 2014 | Mortadelo and Filemon: Mission Implausible | Spain | Javier Fesser | Ilion Animation Studios; Zeta Studios; Películas Pendleton; Televisión Española | | CGI |
| 2014 | Jigen's Gravestone | Japan | Takeshi Koike | TMS Entertainment; Telecom Animation Film | | Traditional |
| 2014 | The Idolmaster Movie: Beyond the Brilliant Future! | Japan | Atsushi Nishigori | A-1 Pictures; Bandai Namco Games | | Traditional |
| 2014 | Back to L.A. | United States; Spain | Pablo Fernandez | | | Traditional |
| 2014 | The Last: Naruto the Movie | Japan | Tsuneo Kobayashi | Studio Pierrot | Based on Naruto by Masashi Kishimoto | Traditional |
| 2014 | Saint Seiya: Legend of Sanctuary | Japan | Keiichi Sato | Toei Animation | | CGI |
| 2014 | Expelled from Paradise | Japan | Seiji Mizushima | Toei Animation; Graphinica | | CGI |
| 2014 | Rocks in My Pockets | United States | Signe Baumane | Zeitgeist Films; New Europe Film Sales; Locomotive Productions; Yekra, Ltd. | | Traditional |
| 2014 | Chaar Sahibzaade | India | Harry Baweja | Baweja Movies; Irealities Technology; Sippy Grewal Production | | CGI |
| 2015 | Anomalisa | United States | Charlie Kaufman; Duke Johnson | Paramount Pictures; Starburns Industries | Nominated for the Academy Award for Best Animated Feature. | Stop-motion |
| 2015 | The Case of Hana & Alice | Japan | Shunji Iwai | | | Traditional |
| 2015 | Miss Hokusai | Japan | Keiichi Hara | Production I.G | | Traditional |
| 2015 | Ghost in the Shell: The New Movie | Japan | Kazuya Nomura | Production I.G | | Traditional |
| 2015 | Harmony | Japan | Takashi Nakamura, Michael Arias | Studio 4°C | | Traditional |
| 2015 | Little from the Fish Shop | Czech Republic, France, Slovakia | Jan Balej | Miracle Film | | Stop-motion |
| 2015 | Cafard | France, Netherlands, Belgium | Jan Bultheel | Tarantula Belgique, Tondo Films, Topkapi Films | | CGI |
| 2015 | El Bandido Cucaracha | Spain | Juan Alonso, Héctor Pisa | Second Man Productions | | Stop-motion |
| 2015 | The Anthem of the Heart | Japan | Tatsuyuki Nagai | A-1 Pictures | | Traditional |
| 2015 | The Magic Mountain | Romania, France, Poland | Anca Damian | Aparte Film, Arizona Productions, Filmograf | | Mixed |
| 2015 | Halo: The Fall of Reach | Canada; US | Frank O'Connor | Sequence; 343 Industries | Set in the Halo universe and acts as a prelude to Halo: Combat Evolved. | CGI |
| 2015 | The Boy and the Beast | Japan | Mamoru Hosoda | Studio Chizu | | Traditional |
| 2015 | The Empire of Corpses | Japan | Ryoutarou Makihara | Wit Studio | | Traditional |
| 2015 | Hell and Back | United States | Tom Gianas; Ross Shuman | ShadowMachine | | Stop-motion |
| 2015 | Madea's Tough Love | United States | Frank Marino | Tyler Perry Studios; Bento Box Entertainment | | Traditional |
| 2015 | Manang Biring | Philippines | Carl Joseph Papa | Black Maria Pictures; Creative Programs Inc. | | Rotoscoping |
| 2015 | Justice League: Throne of Atlantis | United States | Ethan Spaulding | Warner Bros. Animation; DC Entertainment; MOI Animation | | Traditional |
| 2015 | Batman vs. Robin | United States | Jay Olivia | Warner Bros. Animation; DC Entertainment; The Answer Studio | | Traditional |
| 2015 | Justice League: Gods and Monsters | United States | Sam Liu | Warner Bros. Animation; DC Entertainment; MOI Animation | | Traditional |
| 2015 | Pirate's Passage | Canada | Mike Barth; Jamie Gallant | Martin's River Ink; PiP Animation Services | | Flash |
| 2015 | Boruto: Naruto the Movie | Japan | Hiroyuki Yamashita | Studio Pierrot | Based on Naruto by Masashi Kishimoto | Traditional |
| 2015 | Dragon Ball Z: Resurrection 'F' | Japan | Tadayoshi Yamamuro | Toei Animation; 20th Century Studios | Based on Dragon Ball by Akira Toriyama | Traditional |
| 2015 | Psycho-Pass: The Movie | Japan | Katsuyuki Motohiro; Naoyoshi Shiotani | Production I.G | | Traditional |
| 2015 | Huevos: Little Rooster's Egg-cellent Adventure Un gallo con muchos huevos | Mexico | Gabriel Riva Palacio Alatriste; Rodolfo Riva Palacio Alatriste | Huevocartoon Producciones | | CGI |
| 2015 | Last Days of Coney Island | United States | Ralph Bakshi | | | Traditional |
| 2015 | When Black Birds Fly | United States | Jimmy Screamer Clauz | Chainsaw Kiss; Draconian Films | | CGI |
| 2016 | A Silent Voice | Japan | Naoko Yamada | Kyoto Animation | | Traditional |
| 2016 | Accel World: Infinite Burst | Japan | Masakazu Obara | Sunrise | | Traditional |
| 2016 | Batman: Bad Blood | United States | Jay Oliva | DC Entertainment; Warner Bros. Animation | | Traditional |
| 2016 | Batman: The Killing Joke | United States | Sam Liu | DC Entertainment; Warner Bros. Animation | Initially planned as a direct-to-video release, but due to the positive feedback on the production, it was commissioned to a limited theatrical release. | Traditional |
| 2016 | Big Fish & Begonia | China | Liang Xuan; Zhang Chun | Beijing Enlight Media; Biantian (Beijing) Media | | Traditional |
| 2016 | Gantz: O | Japan | Yasushi Kawamura | Digital Frontier | | CGI |
| 2016 | Garo: Divine Flame | Japan | Yuichiro Hayashi | MAPPA | | CGI; Traditional |
| 2016 | In This Corner of the World | Japan | Sunao Katabuchi | MAPPA | | Traditional |
| 2016 | Justice League vs. Teen Titans | United States | Sam Liu | Warner Bros. Animation; DC Entertainment | | Traditional |
| 2016 | Kingsglaive: Final Fantasy XV | Japan | Takeshi Nozue | Visual Works; Digic Pictures, Image Engine | Based on the setting and story of the 2016 video game Final Fantasy XV. | CGI |
| 2016 | My Life as a Courgette | Switzerland; France | Claude Barras | Praesens-Film; Gébéka Films | Based on Autobiographie d'une Courgette by Gilles Paris | Stop-motion |
| 2016 | One Piece Film: Gold | Japan | Hiroaki Miyamoto | Toei Animation; Toei Company | Based on One Piece by Eiichiro Oda | Traditional |
| 2016 | Sausage Party | United States; Canada | Conrad Vernon; Greg Tiernan | Columbia Pictures; Point Grey Pictures; Annapurna Pictures; Nitrogen Studios Canada, Inc. | First computer-animated film in the United States to be rated R by the MPAA, it was originally going to be NC-17, but it was edited several times to be rated R. | CGI |
| 2016 | Saving Sally | Philippines | Avid Liongoren | Rocketsheep Studios; Mandrake Films; KB Studios; Alchemedia Productions | | Live-action/Flash/Traditional |
| 2016 | Seoul Station | South Korea | Yeon Sang-ho | Studio Dadashow; Red Peter Pictures | | Traditional |
| 2016 | Tower | United States | Keith Maitland | Kino Lorber | | Rotoscoping; Traditional |
| 2016 | Nerdland | United States | Chris Prynoski | Samuel Goldwyn Films; Titmouse, Inc. | | Flash |
| 2016 | Bad Cat | Turkey | Mehmet Kurtuluş | | | CGI |
| 2016 | Nova Seed | Japan, Canada | Nick DiLiberto | Gorgon Pictures, House of Cool | | Traditional |
| 2016 | The Red Turtle | France, Japan | Michaël Dudok de Wit | Studio Ghibli, Wild Bunch, Prima Linea Productions, Why Not Productions, Arte France Cinéma, CN4 Productions, Belvision | | Traditional |
| 2016 | Your Name | Japan | Makoto Shinkai | CoMix Wave Films | | Traditional |
| 2016 | The Girl Without Hands | France | Sébastien Laudenbach | Les Films Sauvages, Les Films Pelléas | | Traditional |
| 2016 | Revengeance | United States | Bill Plympton | Plymptoons | | Traditional |
| 2016 | Ethel & Ernest | United Kingdom | Roger Mainwood | Lupus Films | | Traditional |
| 2016 | Zoolander: Super Model | United States | Aaron Augenblick | Augenblick Studios; Insurge Pictures; Red Hour Productions | | Flash |
| 2016 | Boom Bust Boom | United Kingdom | Terry Jones, Bill Jones, Ben Timlett | | | Live-action/animation |
| 2016 | Max & Me | Spain; United States | Donovan Cook | Dos Corazones Films; Imagination Films | | CGI |
| 2017 | Justice League Dark | United States | Jay Oliva | Warner Bros. Animation; DC Entertainment | | Traditional |
| 2017 | My Entire High School Sinking Into the Sea | United States | Dash Shaw | Washington Square Films; Electric Chinoland; Low Spark Films | | Traditional |
| 2017 | Black Butler: Book of the Atlantic | Japan | Noriyuki Abe | A-1 Pictures | | Traditional |
| 2017 | Blame! | Japan | Hiroyuki Seshita | Polygon Pictures | Based on Blame! by Tsutomu Nihei | CGI |
| 2017 | Fate/stay night: Heaven's Feel | Japan | Tomodori Sudou | Ufotable | | Traditional |
| 2017 | Genocidal Organ | Japan | Shūkō Murase | Manglobe; Geno Studio | | Traditional |
| 2017 | Godzilla: Planet of the Monsters | Japan | Kōbun Shizuno; Hiroyuki Seshita | Polygon Pictures; Toho Animation | | CGI |
| 2017 | Resident Evil: Vendetta | Japan | Takanori Tsujimoto | Capcom; Marza Animation Planet | Set in the Resident Evil video game universe. | CGI |
| 2017 | Sword Art Online The Movie: Ordinal Scale | Japan | Tomohiko Itō | A-1 Pictures | | Traditional |
| 2017 | Birdboy: The Forgotten Children | Spain | Pedro Rivero; Alberto Vázquez | ZircoZine; Basque Films; Abrakam Estudio; La Competencia Producciones; Studio 4°C | | Traditional |
| 2017 | The Breadwinner | Canada; Ireland; Luxembourg | Nora Twomey | Aircraft Pictures; Cartoon Saloon; Guru Studio; Irish Film Board; Jolie Pas; Melusine Productions; Telefilm Canada | It received ten Annie Award nominations, winning Best Independent Animated Feature and lost all categories to Coco, making it the most nominations for an adult animated film ever at the awards. | Traditional |
| 2017 | Goemon's Blood Spray | Japan | Takeshi Koike | TMS Entertainment; Telecom Animation Film | | |
| 2017 | Have a Nice Day | China | Liu Chan | Nezha Bros. Pictures; Le-joy Animation Studio | | Traditional |
| 2017 | Mutafukaz | France; Japan | Shōjirō Nishimi; Guillaume "Run" Renard | Ankama Animations; Studio 4 °C | | Traditional |
| 2017 | Tehran Taboo | Germany; Austria | Ali Soozandeh | Little Dream Entertainment; Coop99 Filmproduktion; Österreichischer Rundfunk | | Traditional |
| 2017 | Loving Vincent | Poland; United Kingdom; United States | Dorota Kobiela; Hugh Welchman | BreakThru Productions; Trademark Films | | Oil-painted; Rotoscoping; Traditional |
| 2017 | Cinderella the Cat | Italy | Alessandro Rak; Ivan Cappiello; Marino Guarnieri; Dario Sansone | Mad Entertainment | | CGI |
| 2017 | Teen Titans: The Judas Contract | United States | Sam Liu | Warner Bros. Animation; DC Entertainment; The Answer Studio | | Traditional |
| 2017 | Batman and Harley Quinn | United States | Sam Liu | Warner Bros. Animation; DC Entertainment; DR Movie | | Traditional |
| 2017 | The Night Is Short, Walk On Girl | Japan | Masaaki Yuasa | Science Saru | | Traditional/Flash |
| 2017 | Zombillenium | France/Belgium | Arthur de Pins, Alexis Ducord | Maybe Movies | | CGI |
| 2017 | I'll Just Live in Bando | South Korea | Lee Young-sun | AniSEED | | Traditional |
| 2017 | Fireworks | Japan | Akiyuki Shinbo, Nobuyuki Takeuchi | Shaft | | Traditional |
| 2017 | Release From Heaven | Iran | Ali Noori-Oskouei | Eshragh Animation, Stunning Media | | Traditional |
| 2017 | Wall | Canada | Cam Christiansen | National Film Board of Canada | | CGI |
| 2017 | Kuso | United States | Steve | Brainfeeder Films; XYZ Films | | Live-action/animation |
| 2017 | On Happiness Road | Taiwan | Hsin Yin Sung | Happiness Road Productions | | Traditional |
| 2017 | Starship Troopers: Traitor of Mars | Japan; US | Shinji Aramaki; Masaru Matsumoto | Stage 6 Films; Sola Digital Arts; Lucent Pictures | Part of the Starship Troopers film series. | CGI |
| 2017 | Virus Tropical | Colombia; Ecuador | Santiago Caicedo | IKKI Films | | Flash |
| 2018 | Marcianos vs. Mexicanos | Mexico | Gabriel Riva Palacio Alatriste; Rodolfo Riva Palacio Alatriste | Huevocartoon Producciones | | Traditional |
| 2018 | Batman: Gotham by Gaslight | United States | Sam Liu | Warner Bros. Animation; DC Entertainment | | Traditional |
| 2018 | Suicide Squad: Hell to Pay | United States | Sam Liu | Warner Bros. Animation; DC Entertainment | | Traditional |
| 2018 | The Death of Superman | United States | Sam Liu | Warner Bros. Animation; DC Entertainment | | Traditional |
| 2018 | Batman Ninja | Japan; US | Junpei Mizusaki | Warner Bros. Animation; DC Entertainment | | CGI |
| 2018 | Ana y Bruno | Mexico | Carlos Carrera | Altavista Films; Lo Coloco Films; Ítaca Films; Ánima Estudios; Discreet Arts Productions | | CGI |
| 2018 | Buñuel in the Labyrinth of the Turtles | Spain | Salvador Simó | Sygnatia The Glow Submarine | | Traditional |
| 2018 | Isle of Dogs | United States; Germany | Wes Anderson | Fox Searchlight Pictures; Indian Paintbrush | | Stop-motion |
| 2018 | Chuck Steel: Night of the Trampires | United Kingdom | Mike Mort | Animortal Studio | | Stop-motion |
| 2018 | Bungo Stray Dogs: Dead Apple | Japan | Takuya Igarashi | Bones | | Traditional |
| 2018 | Black Is Beltza | Spain | Fermín Muguruza | Setmàgic Audiovisual; Talka Records and Films | | Traditional |
| 2018 | Flavors of Youth | Japan; China | Li Haoling; Jiaoshou Yi Xiaoxing; Yoshitaka Takeuchi | Haoliners Animation League; CoMix Wave Films | | Traditional |
| 2018 | Garo: The Fleeting Cherry Blossom | Japan | Satoshi Nishimura | Studio M2; Studio VOLN | | Traditional |
| 2018 | Godzilla: City on the Edge of Battle | Japan | Kobun Shizuno; Hiroyuki Seshita | Polygon Pictures; Toho Animation | | CGI |
| 2018 | Godzilla: The Planet Eater | Japan | Kobun Shizuno; Hiroyuki Seshita | Polygon Pictures; Toho Animation | | CGI |
| 2018 | Ready Player One | United States | Steven Spielberg | Warner Bros. Pictures; Amblin Partners; Amblin Entertainment; Village Roadshow Pictures; De Line Pictures; Farah Films & Management | | Live-action; CGI; Motion capture |
| 2018 | Ruben Brandt, Collector | United States; Hungary | Milorad Krstić | Sony Pictures Classics | | Traditional |
| 2018 | Memoirs of a Man in Pajamas | Spain | Carlos FerFer | Dream Team Concept Ladybug Films Movistar Plus+ Televisión de Galicia (TVG) RTVE | | Traditional |
| 2018 | Dragon Ball Super: Broly | Japan | Tatsuya Nagamine | Toei Animation | | Traditional |
| 2018 | My Hero Academia: Two Heroes | Japan | Kenji Nagasaki | Bones | | Traditional |
| 2018 | The Predator Holiday Special | United States | David Brooks; Alex Kamer | Stoopid Buddy Stoodios (20th Century Animation) | Based on Predator by Jim and John Thomas | Stop-motion |
| 2018 | Olimpia | Mexico | José Manuel Cravioto | Pirexia Films National Autonomous University of Mexico | It is the first Mexican animated film to fully use the rotoscoping technique. | Rotoscoping |
| 2018 | Another Day of Life | Poland; Spain; Belgium; Germany; Hungary | Raul de la Fuente; Damian Nenow | Platige Image; Kanaki Films | | CGI; Rotoscoping |
| 2018 | Checkered Ninja | Denmark | Thorbjørn Christoffersen; Anders Matthesen | A. Film; Pop Up Production; Sudoku ApS; Nordisk Film; LevelK | | CGI |
| 2018 | The Leaving | Philippines | Carl Joseph Papa | | | Rotoscoping/Traditional |
| 2018 | The Wolf House | Chile | Cristobal León Joaquín Cociña | Diluvio Globo Rojo Films | | Stop-motion |
| 2018 | North of Blue | United States | Joanna Priestley | Joanna Priestley Motion Pictures | | Traditional |
| 2018 | Chris the Swiss | Switzerland, Germany, Croatia, Finland | Anja Kofmel | Dschoint Ventschr, Ma.Ja.De, Nukleus film | | Traditional |
| 2018 | Constantine: City of Demons: The Movie | United States | Doug Murphy | Warner Bros. Animation; DC Entertainment | | Traditional |
| 2018 | Hoffmaniada | Russia | Stanislav Sokolov | Soyuzmultfilm | | Stop-motion |
| 2018 | Motel Rose | South Korea | Yeo Eun-a | | | Traditional |
| 2018 | ZOOks | Belgium | Dimitri Leue, Kristoff Leue | The Fridge, Potemkino, Sancta Media | | CGI |
| 2018 | Seder-Masochism | United States | Nina Paley | | | Flash |
| 2018 | Ville Neuve | Canada | Félix Dufour-Laperrière | Productions l'Unite Centrale | | Traditional |
| 2018 | Samouni Road | Italy, France | Stefano Savona | Dugong Films, Picofilms, Alterego Productions, Rai Cinema, Arte France Cinéma | | CGI/Traditional |
| 2018 | I Want to Eat Your Pancreas | Japan | Shinichiro Ushijima | Studio VOLN | | Traditional |
| 2018 | The Tower | France, Norway, Sweden | Mats Grorud | Les Contes modernes, Cinenic Film, Tenk.tv | | Flash/Stop-motion |
| 2018 | Funan | France, Belgium, Luxembourg, Cambodia | Denis Do | Les Films d'Ici, Lunanime, Bac Films, Web Spider Production, Ithinkasia | | Traditional |
| 2018 | Liz and the Blue Bird | Japan | Naoko Yamada | Kyoto Animation | | Traditional |
| 2018 | The Last Fiction | Iran | Ashkan Rahgozar | Hoorakhsh studio | | CGI |
| 2018 | Maquia: When the Promised Flower Blooms | Japan | Mari Okada | P.A. Works | | CGI/Traditional |
| 2019 | Justice League vs. the Fatal Five | United States | Sam Liu | Warner Bros. Animation; DC Entertainment | Direct-to-DVD | Traditional |
| 2019 | Reign of the Supermen | United States | Sam Liu | Warner Bros. Animation; DC Entertainment | Direct-to-DVD | Traditional |
| 2019 | Batman vs. Teenage Mutant Ninja Turtles | United States | Jake Castorena | Warner Bros. Animation; DC Entertainment | Direct-to-DVD | Traditional |
| 2019 | Batman: Hush | United States | Justin Copeland | Warner Bros. Animation; DC Entertainment | Direct-to-DVD | Traditional |
| 2019 | Wonder Woman: Bloodlines | United States | Justin Copeland; Sam Liu | Warner Bros. Animation; DC Entertainment | Direct-to-DVD | Traditional |
| 2019 | Homeless | Chile; Argentina | Jorge Campusano; José Ignacio Navarro; Santiago O'Ryan | Fábula; Laurent Lunes | | Flash/Traditional |
| 2019 | A Cidade dos Piratas | Brazil | Otto Guerra | Otto Desenhos Animados | | Traditional |
| 2019 | One Piece Film: Stampede | Japan | Takashi Otsuka | Toei Animation; Toei Company | Based on One Piece by Eiichiro Oda | Traditional |
| 2019 | Fujiko's Lie | Japan | Takeshi Koike | TMS Entertainment; Telecom Animation Film | | Traditional |
| 2019 | White Snake | China; United States | Amp Wong; Zhao Ji | Light Chaser Animation Studios; Warner Bros. Far East | | CGI |
| 2019 | I Lost My Body | France | Jérémy Clapin | SFXfilms; Xilam Animation | | Rotoscoping; Traditional; CGI |
| 2019 | Ne Zha | China | Jiaozi | Chengdu Coco Cartoon; Beijing Enlight Pictures | Based on Investiture of the Gods by Xu Zhonglin | CGI |
| 2019 | Away | Latvia | Gints Zilbalodis | Bilababa | | CGI |
| 2019 | Ride Your Wave | Japan | Masaaki Yuasa | Science SARU | | Traditional |
| 2019 | Weathering with You | Japan | Makoto Shinkai | CoMix Wave Films | | Traditional |
| 2019 | The Old Man Movie | Estonia | Mikk Mägi; Oskar Lehemaa | BOP Animation | | Stop-motion |
| 2019 | The Legend of Hei | China | MTJJ | Mutou, Beijing Joy Pictures, MTJJ Animation, Beijing Jiyin Yinghua, Beijing Han Mu Chun Hua Animation | | Traditional |
| 2019 | Hello World | Japan | Tomohiko Itō | Graphinica | | Traditional |
| 2019 | Cleaners | Philippines | Glenn Barit | Dambuhala Productions; Point Bee Multimedia; Wapak Sound Studios; Quantum Films plan.c Quezon City Film; Development Commission; Oktopus Productions | | Mixed |
| 2019 | Bombay Rose | India | Gitanjali Rao | Cinestaan Film Company | | Traditional |
| 2019 | The Swallows of Kabul | France; Switzerland; Luxembourg; Monaco | Zabou Breitman; Eléa Gobbé-Mévellec | Les Armateurs; Mélusine Productions Studio 352; Close Up Films | | Traditional |
| 2019 | No.7 Cherry Lane | Hong Kong; China | Yonfan | | | Traditional |
| 2019 | Human Lost | Japan | Fuminori Kizaki | Polygon Pictures | | CGI |
| 2019 | My Hero Academia: Heroes Rising | Japan | Kenji Nagasaki | Bones | | Traditional |
| 2019 | On-Gaku: Our Sound | Japan | Kenji Iwaisawa | Rock 'n Roll Mountain; TipTop | | Rotoscoping; Traditional |
| 2019 | The Big Lez Show: Choomah Island | Australia | Jarrad Wright | | | Flash |

== 2020s ==
| Year | Title | Country | Director | Studio | Notes | Animation Technique |
|---|---|---|---|---|---|---|
| 2020 | Deathstroke: Knights & Dragons: The Movie | United States | Sung Jin Ahn | Warner Bros. Animation; Blue Ribbon Content; DC Entertainment; Berlanti Productions | Direct-to-DVD | Traditional |
| 2020 | Justice League Dark: Apokolips War | United States | Matt Peters; Christian Sotta | Warner Bros. Animation; DC Entertainment | Direct-to-DVD | Traditional |
| 2020 | Masameer: The Movie | Saudi Arabia | Malik Nejer | Myrkott Animation Studio | | Flash |
| 2020 | Mortal Kombat Legends: Scorpion's Revenge | United States | Ethan Spaulding | Warner Bros. Animation | Direct-to-DVD | Traditional |
| 2020 | Superman: Man of Tomorrow | United States | Chris Palmer | Warner Bros. Animation; DC Entertainment | Direct-to-DVD | Traditional |
| 2020 | Superman: Red Son | United States | Sam Liu | Warner Bros. Animation; DC Entertainment | Direct-to-DVD | Traditional |
| 2020 | To Your Last Death | United States | Jason Axinn | Coverage Ink Films | | CGI |
| 2020 | Trump vs the Illuminati | United States | BC Fourteen | Ruthless Studios | | CGI |
| 2020 | Altered Carbon: Resleeved | Japan | Takeru Nakajima; Yoshiyuki Okuda | Anima | | CGI |
| 2020 | Batman: Death in the Family | United States | Brandon Vietti | Warner Bros. Animation; DC Entertainment | Direct-to-DVD | Traditional |
| 2020 | Hayop Ka! | Philippines | Avid Liongoren | Rocketsheep Studio; Spring Films | Also known as You Animal! | Flash |
| 2020 | If Anything Happens I Love You | United States | Will McCormack; Michael Govier | Gilbert Films; Oh Good Productions | | Traditional |
| 2020 | Kill It and Leave This Town | Poland | Mariusz Wilczyński | Bombonierka | | Traditional |
| 2020 | Demon Slayer: Kimetsu no Yaiba the Movie: Mugen Train | Japan | Haruo Sotozaki | Ufotable; Toho; Aniplex | Also known as Demon Slayer: Mugen Train/Infinity Train. First R-rated animated film to break several box office records, including the highest-grossing film of 2020. | Traditional |
| 2020 | Goblin Slayer: Goblin's Crown | Japan | Takaharu Ozaki | White Fox | | Traditional |
| 2020 | Soul Snatcher | China; Hong Kong | Song Haolin; Yi Liqi | Heroplus (Wuxi) Limited; Beijing White Horse Time TV & Movie Co., Ltd. Edko (Beijing) Films Limited; Edko Films Limited; Irresistible Alpha Limited; Beijing Weimeng Internet; Technology Co., Ltd. Huawen Picture Co., Ltd. Douyin Culture (Xiamen) Limited | | Live-action; CGI; Motion capture Rotoscoping |
| 2020 | Josep | France/Belgium/Spain | Aurel | Les Films d’Ici Méditerranée, Les Films du Poisson Rouge, In Effecto, Tchack, Les Films d’Ici, Lunanime, Promenons-nous dans les bois | | Traditional |
| 2020 | Accidental Luxuriance of the Translucent Watery Rebus | Croatia | Dalibor Baric | Kaos | | Multimedia |
| 2020 | Happy-Go-Lucky Days | Japan | Takuya Satō | Liden Films Kyoto Studio | | Traditional |
| 2020 | Love Me, Love Me Not | Japan | Toshimasa Kuroyanagi | A-1 Pictures | | Traditional |
| 2020 | The Nose or the Conspiracy of Mavericks | Russia | Andrey Khrzhanovsky | School-Studio "Shar" | | Traditional |
| 2020 | True North | Indonesia/Japan | Eiji Han Shimizu | Studio Raboon, Sumimasen Pte. Ltd. | | CGI |
| 2020 | Mr. Miao | China | Lingxiao Li | Gudong animation studio | | Traditional |
| 2020 | Beauty Water | South Korea | Kyung-hun Cho | SS ANIMENT INC. Byungjin JEON; STUDIO ANIMA | | Traditional |
| 2020 | Jiang Ziya | China | Cheng Teng, Li Wei | Beijing Enlight Pictures | | CGI |
| 2020 | My Favorite War | Norway/Latvia | Ilze Burkovska Jacobsen | Bivrost Film, Ego Media | | Flash |
| 2020 | Josee, the Tiger, and the Fish | Japan | Kotaro Tamura | Bones | | Traditional |
| 2021 | America: The Motion Picture | United States | Matt Thompson | Netflix Animation; Floyd County Productions; Lord Miller Productions | | Flash/Traditional |
| 2021 | Batman: Soul of the Dragon | United States | Sam Liu | Warner Bros. Animation; DC Entertainment | Direct-to-DVD | Traditional |
| 2021 | Batman: The Long Halloween | United States | Chris Palmer | Warner Bros. Animation; DC Entertainment | Direct-to-DVD | Traditional |
| 2021 | Belle | Japan | Mamoru Hosoda | Studio Chizu | | Traditional; CGI |
| 2021 | Charlotte | Canada; Belgium; France | Éric Warin, Tahir Rana | January Films; Sons of Manual; Les Productions Balthazar; Walking the Dog | | Flash/Traditional |
| 2021 | Checkered Ninja 2 | Denmark | Thorbjørn Christoffersen; Anders Matthesen | A. Film; Pop Up Production; Sudoku ApS; Nordisk Film; LevelK | | CGI |
| 2021 | Cryptozoo | United States | Dash Shaw | | | Flash |
| 2021 | Evangelion: 3.0+1.0 Thrice Upon a Time | Japan | Hideaki Anno; Kazuya Tsurumaki; Katsuichi Nakayama; Mahiro Maeda | | | Traditional |
| 2021 | Flee | United States; United Kingdom; France; Sweden; Norway; Denmark | Jonas Poher Rasmussen | Neon | | Traditional |
| 2021 | Green Snake | China | Amp Wong | Light Chaser Animation Studios; Alibaba Pictures; Tianjin Maoyan Weiying Culture Media; Bilibili | | CGI |
| 2021 | Gora Automatikoa | Spain | David Galán Galindo; Esaú Dharma; Pablo Vara | 39 Escalones Films; The Other Film Production | | Flash animation |
| 2021 | Jujutsu Kaisen 0 | Japan | Sunghoo Park | MAPPA | | Traditional |
| 2021 | Injustice | United States | Matt Peters | Warner Bros. Animation; DC Entertainment | Direct-to-DVD | Traditional |
| 2021 | Justice Society: World War II | United States | Jeff Wamester | Warner Bros. Animation; DC Entertainment | Direct-to-DVD | Traditional |
| 2021 | Mad God | United States | Phil Tippett | Tippett Studio; Shudder | Direct-to-DVD | Stop-motion |
| 2021 | Mortal Kombat Legends: Battle of the Realms | United States | Ethan Spaulding | Warner Bros. Animation | Direct-to-DVD | Traditional |
| 2021 | My Hero Academia: World Heroes' Mission | Japan | Kenji Nagasaki | Toho | Direct-to-DVD | Traditional |
| 2021 | Night of the Animated Dead | United States | Jason Axinn | Warner Bros. Home Entertainment | Direct-to-DVD | Traditional |
| 2021 | Nimuendajú | Brazil | Tania Anaya | | Direct-to-DVD | Rotoscoping; Traditional |
| 2021 | Bright: Samurai Soul | United States; Japan | Kyōhei Ishiguro | Arect | | CGI; Traditional |
| 2021 | Archipelago | Canada | Félix Dufour-Laperrière | La Distributrices de Films, Miyu Distribution, L'Embuscade Films | | Traditional |
| 2021 | New Gods: Nezha Reborn | China | Zhao Ji | Light Chaser Animation Studios, Alibaba Pictures, Bona Film Group, Bilibili, Pop Mart | | CGI |
| 2021 | Alephia 2053 | Lebanon/France | Jorj Abou Mhaya | Spring Entertainment | | Traditional |
| 2021 | The Spine of Night | United States | Philip Gelatt; Morgan Galen King | RLJE Films; Shudder; Gorgonaut; Reno Productions | | Traditional |
| 2021 | StEvEn & Parker | United States | John Krasinski | Columbia Pictures; Sunday Night Productions; Point Grey Pictures | | CGI; Traditional |
| 2021 | The Deer King | Japan | Masashi Ando, Masayuki Miyaji | Production I.G | | Traditional |
| 2021 | Hula Fulla Dance | Japan | Seiji Mizushima, Shinya Watada | Bandai Namco Pictures | | Traditional |
| 2021 | My Sunny Maad | Czech Republic, Slovakia, France | Michaela Pavlátová | Negativ Film, Sacrebleu Productions, BFILM.cz, Alkay Animation, Gao Shan Pictures, Innervision | | Traditional |
| 2021 | The Summit of the Gods | France | Patrick Imbert | Folivari | | Traditional |
| 2021 | The Witcher: Nightmare of the Wolf | United States; South Korea; Poland | Kwang Il Han | Studio Mir; Netflix | | Traditional |
| 2021 | Legend of Destruction | Israel, United States | Gidi Dar | Eddie King Films, Lama Films, Memento International, Nakhshon Films, HOT8, Kan 11 | | Oil-painted/Traditional |
| 2021 | A Crocodile Who Will Die in 100 Days | Japan | Shinichiro Ueda | TIA | | Traditional |
| 2021 | Bob Spit: We Do Not Like People | Brazil | César Cabral | Coala Filmes | | Stop-motion |
| 2021 | The Journey | Saudi Arabia, Japan | Shizuno Kobun | Toei Animation, Manga Productions | | Traditional |
| 2022 | The Adventures of Drunky | United States | Aaron Augenblick; Fletcher Moules | Augenblick Studios; Cartuna | | Flash |
| 2022 | Apollo 10½: A Space Age Childhood | United States | Richard Linklater | Netflix Animation; Minnow Mountain; Submarine | | Rotoscope |
| 2022 | Aqua Teen Forever: Plantasm | United States | Matt Maiellaro; Dave Willis | Williams Street | Direct-to-DVD | Flash/Traditional |
| 2022 | Aurora's Sunrise | Armenia; Lithuania; Germany | Inna Sahakyan | Bars Media Broom Films Gebrueder Beetz Filmproduktion | | Paper cutout CGI |
| 2022 | Batman and Superman: Battle of the Super Sons | United States | Matt Peters | Warner Bros. Animation; DC Entertainment | Direct-to-DVD | CGI |
| 2022 | Beavis and Butt-Head Do the Universe | United States | Mike Judge | MTV Entertainment Studios; Judgemental Films; Titmouse, Inc. | | Flash |
| 2022 | The Bob's Burgers Movie | United States | Loren Bouchard; Bernard Derriman | 20th Century Studios; 20th Century Animation; Bento Box Entertainment; Wilo Productions | | Traditional |
| 2022 | Catwoman: Hunted | United States | Shinsuke Terasawa | Warner Bros. Animation; DC Entertainment | Direct-to-DVD | Traditional |
| 2022 | Eien no 831 | Japan | Kenji Kamiyama | Craftar | | CGI |
| 2022 | Entergalatic | United States | Fletcher Moules | Netflix Animation | | CGI |
| 2022 | Eternal Spring | Canada | Jason Loftus | Lofty Sky Entertainment | | Traditional |
| 2022 | Fairytale | Russia; Belgium | Alexander Sokurov | Intonations | | Multimedia; Live-action |
| 2022 | The First Slam Dunk | Japan | Takehiko Inoue | Toei Animation; DandeLion Animation Studio | Sports | CGI; Traditional |
| 2022 | Icarus | Luxembourg | Carlo Vogele | Iris Productions | | CGI; Traditional |
| 2022 | Green Lantern: Beware My Power | United States | Jeff Wamester | Warner Bros. Animation; DC Entertainment | Direct-to-DVD | Traditional |
| 2022 | Home Is Somewhere Else | United States; Mexico | Carlos Hagerman; Jorge Villalobos | Brinca Animation Studio; Shine Global | Documentary | Traditional |
| 2022 | The House | United Kingdom | Paloma Baeza; Niki Lindroth von Bahr; Marc James Roels; Emma de Swaef | Netflix Animation; Nexus Studios | Anthology film special comprising three separate stories. | Stop-motion |
| 2022 | The People's Joker | United States | Vera Drew | Altered Innocence | Superhero parody and re-imagining | Live Action Mixed |
| 2022 | Mortal Kombat Legends: Snow Blind | United States | Rick Morales | Warner Bros. Animation | Direct-to-DVD | Traditional |
| 2022 | Nayola | Portugal; France; Belgium; Netherlands | José Miguel Ribeiro | Praça Filmes; S.O.I.L. Productions; JPL Films il Luster; Luna Blue Film | | Traditional |
| 2022 | Odd Taxi: In the Woods | Japan | Baku Kinoshita | OLM Team Yoshioka; P.I.C.S | Based on Odd Taxi by Kazuya Konomoto | Traditional |
| 2022 | One Piece Film: Red | Japan | Gorō Taniguchi | Toei Animation, Toei Company | Based on One Piece by Eiichiro Oda | Traditional |
| 2022 | The Other Shape | Colombia; Brazil | Diego Felipe Guzmán | RTVC Play; Hierro Animación; Estúdio GIZ; Dinamita Animación | | Traditional |
| 2022 | No Dogs or Italians Allowed | France; Italy; Belgium; Switzerland; Portugal | Alain Ughetto | Les Films du Tambour de Soie; Vivement Lundi! Foliascope; Graffiti Film; Lux Fugit Film; Umedia; Nadasdy Film; Ocidental Filmes; Auvergne-Rhône-Alpes Cinéma; Radio Télévision Suisse | | Stop-motion |
| 2022 | El paraíso | Argentina | Fernando Sirianni; Federico Breser | FS Entertainment; Nomad Cine; EOK Producciones; McFly Studio | | CGI |
| 2022 | Black Is Beltza II: Ainhoa | Spain; Argentina | Fermín Muguruza | BIB2 Ainhoa AIE; Talka Records; Draftoon; Lagarto | | Flash |
| 2022 | Dragon Ball Super: Super Hero | Japan | Tetsuro Kodama | Toei Animation | | CGI |
| 2022 | TeraStorm | Kenya | Andrew Kaggia | Afrikana Digital | | CGI |
| 2022 | My Father's Secrets | France, Belgium | Véra Belmont | Je Suis Bien Content | | Traditional |
| 2022 | Blind Willow, Sleeping Woman | Canada; France; Luxembourg; Netherlands | Pierre Földes | Miyu Productions, Cinéma De facto, Doghouse Films, micro_scope, Productions L'Unité Centrale, An Original Picture, Studio MA, Arte France Cinéma, Auvergne-Rhône-Alpes Cinéma | | Traditional |
| 2022 | My Love Affair with Marriage | Latvia; United States; Luxembourg | Signe Baumane | Studio Locomotive; The Marriage Project; Antevita Films | | Traditional; Stop-motion |
| 2022 | Unicorn Wars | Spain; France | Alberto Vázquez | Abano Producións; Uniko; Unicorn Wars AIE; Autour de Minuit; Schmuby Productions | | CGI; Traditional |
| 2022 | Wendell & Wild | United States | Henry Selick | Netflix Animation; Monkeypaw Productions; Gotham Group; Principato-Young Entertainment | | Stop-motion |
| 2023 | Art College 1994 | China | Liu Jian | Nezha Bros. Pictures Company Limited; Modern Sky Entertainment Company Limited; China Academy Of Art's School of Animation and Game | | Traditional |
| 2023 | Batman: The Doom That Came to Gotham | United States | Christopher Berkeley; Sam Liu | Warner Bros. Animation; DC Entertainment | Direct-to-DVD | Traditional |
| 2023 | Black Clover: Sword of the Wizard King | Japan | Ayataka Tanemura | Studio Pierrot | Based on Ayataka Tanemura by Yūki Tabata | Traditional |
| 2023 | Four Souls of Coyote | Hungary | Áron Gauder | Cinemon Entertainment | | Traditional |
| 2023 | Metalocalypse: Army of the Doomstar | United States | Brendon Small; Tommy Blacha | Williams Street; Titmouse, Inc. | Direct-to-DVD | Traditional |
| 2023 | The Missing | Philippines | Carl Joseph Papa | Project 8 Projects | | Rotoscope |
| 2023 | The Peasants | Poland; Serba; Lithuania | DK Welchman; Hugh Welchman | BreakThru Films; DigitalKraft; Art Shot | | Oil-painted; Rotoscoping; Traditional |
| 2023 | Robot Dreams | Spain; France | Pablo Berger | Arcadia | | Traditional |
| 2023 | They Shot the Piano Player | Spain; France; Netherlands | Fernando Trueba; Javier Mariscal | Fernando Trueba PC; Les Films D’ici; Submarine Animanostra | | Traditional |
| 2023 | Resident Evil: Death Island | Japan | Eiichirō Hasumi | Capcom; TMS Entertainment | Set in the Resident Evil video game universe. | CGI |
| 2023 | The Venture Bros.: Radiant Is the Blood of the Baboon Heart | United States | Jackson Publick | Williams Street; Astro Base GO! Titmouse, Inc. | Direct-to-DVD | Traditional |
| 2023 | Mortal Kombat Legends: Cage Match | United States | Ethan Spaulding | Warner Bros. Animation | Direct-to-DVD | Traditional |
| 2023 | The Boy and the Heron | Japan | Hayao Miyazaki | Studio Ghibli | Winner of the Academy Award for Best Animated Feature. | Traditional |
| 2023 | Stopmotion | United Kingdom | Robert Morgan | British Film Institute blueLight | | Live-action; Stop-motion |
| 2023 | Justice League: Warworld | United States | Jeff Wamester | Warner Bros. Animation; DC Entertainment | Direct-to-DVD | Traditional |
| 2023 | Legion of Super-Heroes | United States | Jeff Wamester | Warner Bros. Animation; DC Entertainment | Direct-to-DVD | Traditional |
| 2023 | When Adam Changes | Canada | Joël Vaudreuil | Parce Que Films | | Traditional |
| 2023 | Komada: A Whisky Family | Japan | Masayuki Yoshihara | P.A. Works | | Traditional |
| 2023 | Emesis Blue | Australia | Chad Payne | Fortress Films | | CGI |
| 2023 | The Siren | France, Germany, Luxembourg, Belgium | Sepideh Farsi | Les Films d'Ici, Katuh Studio, Bac Cinéma, Lunanime, TrickStudio Lutterbeck | | CGI |
| 2023 | White Plastic Sky | Hungary, Slovakia | Tibor Bánóczki, Sarolta Szabó | Salto Film, Artichoke | | Rotoscope/Traditional/CGI |
| 2023 | Pastacolypse | United States | Matt Maiellaro | Tubi; Fox Entertainment Studios; Bento Box Entertainment | | Traditional/Flash |
| 2023 | Pelikan Blue | Hungary | László Csáki | Cinemon Entertainment, Umbrella | | Traditional |
| 2023 | Sultana's Dream | Spain, Germany | Isabel Herguera | Sultana Films, Gatoverde Producciones, Abano Producións, Uniko Estudio Creativo, Fabian & Fred | | Oil-painted/Traditional |
| 2023 | Mars Express | France | Jérémie Périn | Everybody on Deck; Je Suis Bien Content; EV.L Prod; Plume Finance; France 3 Cinéma; Shine Conseils; Gebeka Films; Amopix | | CGI; Flash; Rotoscoping; Traditional |
| 2023 | Spy × Family Code: White | Japan | Takashi Katagiri | Wit Studio; CloverWorks | | Traditional |
| 2024 | Animalia Paradoxa | Chile | Niles Atallah | Diluvio; Globo Rojo Producciones | | Live-action; Stop-motion |
| 2024 | Boys Go to Jupiter | United States | Julian Glander | Glanderco | | CGI |
| 2024 | Bouchra | Italy; Morocco; United States | Meriem Bennani; Orian Barki | Fondazione Prada; 2 Lizards Production; Hi Production; SB Films | | CGI |
| 2024 | Dan Da Dan: First Encounter | Japan | Fūga Yamashiro | Science Saru | Based on Dandadan by Yukinobu Tatsu | Traditional/Flash/CGI |
| 2024 | Exorcism Chronicles: The Beginning | South Korea | Kim Dong-chul | Locus Animation Studios | | CGI |
| 2024 | Living Large | Czech Republic; France; Slovakia | Kristina Dufková | Barletta; Czech Television; NOVINSKI; Novanima Productions | | Stop-motion |
| 2024 | Look Back | Japan | Kiyotaka Oshiyama | Studio Durian | | Traditional |
| 2024 | The Most Precious of Cargoes | France | Michel Hazanavicius | Les Films du Fleuve, Prima Linea Productions, Studiocanal, Les Compagnons du Cinema, Ex Nihilo | | Traditional |
| 2024 | Isla Monstro | United States | Steven Shea | The Nacelle Company; Abyssmal Entertainment | | Flash |
| 2024 | Sunburnt Unicorn | Canada | Nick Johnson | 2448223 Alberta | | CGI |
| 2024 | Dongeng Sang Kancil | Malaysia | Ahmad Razuri Roseli | Les' Copaque Production, Astro Shaw | | CGI |
| 2024 | Maya, Give Me a Title | France | Michel Gondry | Partizan Films | | Cutout/Stop-motion |
| 2024 | Justice League: Crisis on Infinite Earths | United States | Jeff Wamester | Warner Bros. Animation; DC Entertainment | Direct-to-DVD; Trilogy | Traditional |
| 2024 | La familia del barrio: La película | Mexico | Rhajov Villafuerte | Lemon Studios | Based on La familia del barrio by Teco Lebrija and Arturo Navarro | Flash |
| 2024 | Liberato's Secret | Italy | Francesco Lettieri; Giorgio Testi; Giuseppe Squillaci; LRNZ | Red Private | | Live-action/Traditional |
| 2024 | Mars | United States | Sevan Najarian | Synergetic Films | | Flash |
| 2024 | Glove and Beanie with Bait | United States | Javier "Javigameboy" Flores | School of Visual Arts | | Flash; Traditional |
| 2024 | The Hyperboreans | Chile | Cristóbal León; Joaquín Cociña | Globo Rojo Producciones León; Cociña Films | | Live-action; Puppetry; Stop-motion |
| 2024 | The Lord of the Rings: The War of the Rohirrim | United States; Japan | Kenji Kamiyama | New Line Cinema; Warner Bros. Animation; Sola Entertainment; WingNut Films | Based on the characters created by J. R. R. Tolkien | Traditional |
| 2024 | Mahavatar Narsimha | India | Ashwin Kumar | Kleem Productions; Hombale Films (presenters only) | | CGI |
| 2024 | Memoir of a Snail | Australia | Adam Elliot | Arenamedia; Snails Pace Films | | Stop-motion |
| 2024 | Olivia & the Clouds | Dominican Republic | Tomás Pichardo Espaillat | Guasábara Cine; Historias de Bibi; Cine Chani | | Traditional |
| 2024 | Piece by Piece | United States | Morgan Neville | Focus Features (United States); Universal Pictures (International); The Lego Group; Tremolo Productions; I Am Other | | CGI |
| 2024 | Punk'd Pooch | Canada | Aberdeen Wasley | Seneca Polytechnic | | Flash; Traditional |
| 2024 | Sanatorium Under the Sign of the Hourglass | Poland; United Kingdom; United States | Stephen Quay; Timothy Quay | British Film Institute; Telewizja Polska S.A. Koninck Studios; SpK Galicia Limited; IKH Pictures Production; The Match Factory | | Live-action/Stop-motion |
| 2024 | Spermageddon | Norway | Tommy Wirkola; Rasmus A. Sivertsen | Qvisten Animation; 74Entertainment | | CGI |
| 2024 | Watchmen Chapter I | United States | Brandon Vietti | Warner Bros. Animation; Paramount Pictures; DC Entertainment | Based on Watchmen by Dave Gibbons | CGI |
| 2024 | Watchmen Chapter II | United States | Brandon Vietti | Warner Bros. Animation; Paramount Pictures; DC Entertainment | Based on Watchmen by Dave Gibbons | CGI |
| 2024 | White Snake: Afloat | China | Jianxi Chen; Jiakai Li | Light Chaser Animation Studios | Inspired by the Chinese folktale Legend of the White Snake | CGI |
| 2025 | Aztec Batman: Clash of Empires | United States; Mexico | Juan Meza-León | Ánima; Warner Bros. Animation; DC Entertainment; Chatrone; Particular Crowd | | Flash |
| 2025 | Decorado | Spain; Portugal | Alberto Vázquez | Abano Producións Uniko Estudio Creativo Glow Animation Sardinha Em Lata María y Arnold AIE | | Traditional |
| 2025 | Batman Ninja vs. Yakuza League | United States; Japan | Junpei Mizusaki; Shinji Takagi | Warner Bros. Japan; DC Entertainment; Warner Bros. Animation; Kamikaze Douga; YamatoWorks; Barnum Studio | | CGI |
| 2025 | Chainsaw Man – The Movie: Reze Arc | Japan | Tatsuya Yoshihara | MAPPA | | Traditional |
| 2025 | Dan Da Dan: Evil Eye | Japan | Fūga Yamashiro; Abel Góngora | Science Saru | Based on Dandadan by Yukinobu Tatsu | Traditional/Flash/CGI |
| 2025 | Demon Slayer: Kimetsu no Yaiba – The Movie: Infinity Castle | Japan | Haruo Sotozaki | Ufotable; Toho; Aniplex; Sony Pictures Releasing (via Crunchyroll; international) | Based on Demon Slayer: Kimetsu no Yaiba by Koyoharu Gotouge | Traditional/CGI |
| 2025 | Dog of God | Latvia; United States | Lauris Ābele; Raitis Ābele | Tritone Studio; Lumiere Lab | Based on the true story of Thiess of Kaltenbrun | Rotoscope |
| 2025 | Dandelion's Odyssey | Belgium; France | Momoko Seto | ARTE France Cinéma; Ecce Films; Fondation Gan pour le Cinéma; Umedia | | CGI/Stop-motion/Live-action |
| 2025 | Checkered Ninja 3 | Denmark | Thorbjørn Christoffersen; Anders Matthesen | A. Film; Pop Up Production; Sudoku ApS | | CGI |
| 2025 | The Rose of Versailles | Japan | Ai Yoshimura | MAPPA | | Traditional |
| 2025 | Death Does Not Exist | Canada; France | Félix Dufour-Laperrière | Embuscade Films; Miyu | | Traditional |
| 2025 | 100 Meters | Japan | Kenji Iwaisawa | Rock 'n' Roll Mountain | | Traditional |
| 2025 | All You Need Is Kill | Japan | Kenichiro Akimoto | Studio 4°C | | CGI/Traditional |
| 2025 | I Am Frankelda | Mexico | Arturo and Roy Ambriz | Cinema Fantasma, Warner Bros. Discovery, Cine Vendaval, Woo Films | | Stop-motion |
| 2025 | Fixed | United States | Genndy Tartakovsky | Netflix; Sony Pictures Animation | Sony Pictures Animation's first R-rated film. | Traditional |
| 2025 | Lost in Starlight | South Korea | Han Ji-won | Netflix | | Traditional |
| 2025 | ChaO | Japan | Yasuhiro Aoki | Studio 4°C | | Traditional |
| 2025 | Peleliu: Guernica of Paradise | Japan | Gorō Kuji | Shin-Ei Animation; Fugaku | | Traditional |
| 2025 | The Last Blossom | Japan | Baku Kinoshita | CLAP | | Traditional |
| 2025 | Awakening Beauty | Spain; United States | Manuel H. Martín; Amparo Martínez Barco | La Claqueta PC | | Traditional |
| 2025 | Lesbian Space Princess | Australia | Emma Hough Hobbs; Leela Varghese | We Made A Thing Studios | | Flash/Traditional |
| 2025 | Allah Is Not Obliged | France, Luxembourg, Belgium, Canada | Zaven Najjar | Creative Touch Studios, Paul Thiltges Distribution, Need Production, Lunamine, Yzanakio | | CGI/Traditional |
| 2025 | Masameer Junior | Saudi Arabia | Malik Nejer | Myrkott Animation Studio; Sirb Productions | | Flash |
| 2025 | The Legend of Hei II | China | MTJJ; Gu Jie | HMCH | | Traditional |
| 2025 | Another World | Hong Kong | Tommy Kai Chung Ng | Point Five Productions; SILVER MEDIA GROUP; Film Development Council | | Traditional |
| 2025 | Ne Zha 2 | China | Jiaozi | Chengdu Coco Cartoon; Beijing Enlight Media; Beijing Enlight Pictures; Chengdu Zizai Jingjie; Culture Media; Beijing Coloroom Technology | Based on Investiture of the Gods by Xu Zhonglin | CGI |
| 2025 | Endless Cookie | Canada | Seth Scriver; Peter Scriver | Scythia Films | | Traditional |
| 2025 | A Magnificent Life | France; Belgium; United States; Luxembourg | Sylvain Chomet | What The Prod; Mediawan; Bidibul Productions; Walking The Dog | | Traditional |
| 2025 | Predator: Killer of Killers | United States | Dan Trachtenberg; Micho Robert Rutare | 20th Century Studios; 20th Century Animation; Davis Entertainment; The Third Floor, Inc. | Based on Predator by Jim and John Thomas | CGI |
| 2025 | The Witcher: Sirens of the Deep | United States | Kang Hei Chul | Studio Mir; Studio IAM; Platige Image; Hivemind | | Traditional |
| 2025 | Scarlet | Japan | Mamoru Hosoda | Studio Chizu; Nippon Television; Columbia Pictures | | CGI/Traditional |
| 2026 | 58th | Philippines | Carl Joseph Papa | GMA Pictures | | Rotoscoping |
| 2026 | Light Pillar | China | Zao Xu | Fengduan Film Co., Ltd. La Fonte | | Traditional/CGI |
| 2026 | In Waves | France; Belgium; United States | Phuong Mai Nguyen | Silex Films; Panique! Charades; France 3 Cinéma; Anonymous Content; Gao Shan Pictures | | Traditional |
| 2026 | Blaise | France | Dimitri Planchon; Jean-Paul Guigue | KG Production | | Cut-out |
| 2026 | Jim Queen | France; Belgium | Marc Nguyen; Nicolas Athané | Bobbypills | | Flash/Traditional |
| 2026 | Viva Carmen | Finland; France; Spain | Sébastien Laudenbach | Folivari; Pikkukala; La Garde Montante Films; Pikkukala Barcelona | | Traditional |
| 2026 | Winnipeg, the Seed of Hope | Argentina; Chile; Spain | Beñat Beitia; Elio Quiroga | Dibulitoon Studio; El Otro Film; La Ballesta; Malabar | | Traditional |
| 2026 | A Neighborhood Family | Mexico | Ornella Artista Sergio Lebrija | F3 Media | | Flash |
| 2026 | O Filho da Puta | Brazil | Erica Maradona; Otto Guerra; Sávio Leite; Tania Anaya | Otto Desenhos Animados; Anaya | | Traditional |
| 2026 | The Orbit of Minor Satellites | United States; Japan | Chris Sullivan | Creative Capital; New Deer | | Mixed |
| 2026 | Welcome to Dolly's House | Taiwan | Rady Fu; Tree Muta; Seven YCH | Deep Sky Object | | Traditional |
| 2026 | Company Sports Day | South Korea | Lee Yong-sun | DAEGULDAEGUL STUDIO | | Traditional |
| 2026 | The Three Kingdoms Part 1: The Battle for Luoyang | China | Junwei Xie | | | CGI |
| 2026 | Magic Atlas | Singapore; China | Sun Xun | ShanghART Gallery; Embassy of the Republic of Austria; Trail Mix Media; Shuhua Fine Arts; Old Heaven Books; Pi Animation Studio | | Traditional |
| 2026 | Batman: Knightfall | United States | Jeff Wamester | Warner Bros. Animation; DC Entertainment | | Traditional |
| 2026 | Tangles | United States Canada | Leah Nelson | Point Grey Pictures Monarch Media Giant Ant Films Lylas Pictures | | Traditional |
| 2026 | Cherry and Virgin | Japan | Masanao Kawajiri | Toei Video Company | | Traditional |
| 2026 | Grotesqqque | Japan | Atsushi Nishigori | CloverWorks | | Traditional |
| 2026 | Wildwood | United States | Travis Knight | Laika; Fathom Entertainment | | Stop-Motion |
| 2026 | Moonfish | United States; Italy | Daniel Zvereff | La Biennale di Venezia; Opah; Present Company; Cartuna; Lucky Accident Productions | | Traditional |
| 2026 | The Amazing Digital Circus: The Last Act | Australia | Gooseworx | Glitch Productions Fathom Entertainment | | CGI |
| 2026 | Ghost | Japan | Shingo Natsume | Bandai Namco Filmworks; Madhouse | | Traditional |
| 2026 | Rogue Trooper | United States; United Kingdom | Duncan Jones | Rebellion Developments; Liberty Films | | CGI |
| 2026 | The Violinist | Singapore; Italy; Spain; Colombia | Raúl García; Ervin Han | Robot Playground Media; TV ON Producciones; Altri occhi Bombillo Amarillo; Mystic House Animation; Throne Inc. Select Entertainment; Little Green White; 108 Media; Infocomm Media Development Authority of Singapore; Inspidea Sdn Bhd; Valencian Institute of Culture | | Traditional |
| 2026 | Ray Gunn | United States | Brad Bird | Netflix; Skydance Animation | | CGI |
| 2026 | Zsazsa Zaturnnah vs the Amazonistas of Planet X | Philippines | Avid Liongoren | Rocketsheep Studio; Ghosts City Films; SC Films International | | Traditional |

== Upcoming ==
| Title | Country | Director | Studio | Notes | Animation Technique |
|---|---|---|---|---|---|
| Death Stranding | Japan | TBA | Kojima Productions; Line Mileage | | TBA |
| Beckoning | United Kingdom; Serbia; Spain | Sava Živković | Snafu Pictures; Bauk Pictures | Set to be animated using Unreal Engine. | CGI |
| Ella Arcangel: Ballad of Tooth and Claw | Philippines | Mervin Malonzo | GMA Pictures Rocketsheep Studio | | Traditional |
| Rage Radio | Philippines | Mark Mendoza | Friendly Foes | | Flash/Traditional |
| Lincoln in the Bardo | United States | Duke Johnson | Playtone; Starburns Industries | | Live-action/Stop-motion |
| Penelope of Sparta | France; US | Jérôme Combe; Silvia Martelossi | Fortiche | | CGI |
| The Trap | United States | Harmony Korine | EDGLRD | | Traditional/CGI |
| Sentinel | United States | Phil Tippett | Tippett Studio | | Stop-motion |
| Sentinel | United States | Philippines | Carl Joseph Papa | | Rotoscoping |
| Ally | South Korea | Bong Joon-ho | 4th Creative Party; CJ Entertainment | | CGI |
| Sunny | Japan | Michael Arias | GKIDS; Dwarf Studios | | Stop motion |
| Pesta | Norway; Germany; France; United States | Hanne Berkaak | GKIDS; Knudsen Pictures; Xilam Studios; Charades; Mikrofilm | | Traditional |
| Heads | United Kingdom | Tiffany Kimmel | Happy Outlier Pictures; Mackinnon & Saunders; Nihil Declarandum | | Stop motion |

== See also ==
- Animation in the United States in the television era
- LGBT representation in adult animation
- Modern animation in the United States
- Lists of animated feature films
- Independent animation
- Cartoon violence
