= Silver Circle =

Silver Circle may refer to:

- Silver Circle (film), a 2013 American animated thriller film
- Silver Circle (law firms), a group of corporate law firms headquartered in London, United Kingdom
- Silver Circle Celebration, an Emmy Award celebration honoring industry veterans
