= The King of Fighters (film) =

2009 film directed by Gordon Chan

- Theatrical release poster
- Directed by: Gordon Chan
- Screenplay by: Rita Augustine; Matthew Ryan Fischer
- Story by: Rita Augustine; Chris Chow
- Based on: The King of Fighters by SNK Playmore
- Produced by: Andrew Mann; Tilo Seiffert; Bobby Sheng; Joseph Chou; Tim Kwok
- Starring: Maggie Q; Sean Faris; Ray Park; David Leitch; Will Yun Lee
- Cinematography: Arthur Wong
- Edited by: Chan Ki-Hop
- Music by: Tetsuya Takahashi
- Production companies: Double Edge Entertainment; Inferno International; VIP Midienfonds 4; Rising Star; Convergence Entertainment; Axis Entertainment; Scion Films
- Distributed by: Micott & Basara (Japan); Well Go USA Entertainment (United States)
- Release dates: November 5, 2009 (United States); August 26, 2010 (Singapore); August 31, 2010 (Canada); June 2, 2011 (Japan)
- Running time: 93 minutes
- Countries: Germany; Japan; Taiwan; United States
- Language: English
- Budget: $12 million
- Box office: $502,153

The King of Fighters is a 2009 science fiction martial arts film directed by Gordon Chan from a screenplay by Rita Augustine and Matthew Ryan Fischer, based on the video game series of the same name published by SNK Playmore. The film stars Maggie Q, Sean Faris, Ray Park, David Leitch, and Will Yun Lee. In the plot, the last surviving descendants of three legendary clans are continuously transported to other dimensions to test their martial arts skills during the King of Fighters tournament against an evil force that seeks to invade and infect the real world.

== Plot ==
The King of Fighters 2009 tournament is held in an alternate dimension. When contestants are issued challenges, they enter the tournament via a special Bluetooth headset.

Mai Shiranui and her boyfriend Iori Yagami attend a private unveiling of three relics at a museum in Boston: The Kagura Mirror, the Yagami Necklace and the Kusanagi Sword. Rugal Bernstein storms into the exhibit and steals the three relics, and uses them to disappear into a dimensional portal to awaken the mythical entity known as the Orochi, which grants limitless powers. The sword is revealed to be a fake and the quest is delayed. Mai is told by an injured Chizuru Kagura the real sword is with Saisyu Kusanagi at a mental institution. She is warned that Iori should not be involved in her quest to defeat Rugal. At the institution, Mai meets a catatonic Saisyu and his son Kyo but Iori's presence suddenly breaks Saisyu's catatonic state, and the elder Kusanagi threatens to kill Iori before losing consciousness and dying.

At another hospital, Chizuru is informed by her colleague Scott that Rugal has altered the King of Fighters 2009 database and issued challenges to fighters around the world. CIA agent Terry Bogard enters Chizuru's room, demanding information on Rugal's whereabouts and the tournament. She tells that different dimensions exist, but when he does not believe it, she tells him to go to Seattle and ask Mai, who is an undercover operative sent by the CIA to infiltrate Chizuru's organization a year ago.

At a cemetery in Seattle, where Saisyu is buried, Kyo and Iori confront each other. Iori explains that both Kusanagi and Yagami clans were destined to be enemies. Mai hitches a ride with Kyo to his home, where she explains that she is looking for the Kusanagi Sword. Kyo tells her that centuries ago, a Yagami ancestor attempted to release the Orochi, but it consumed him with murderous rage. Kyo's ancestor killed the Yagami and returned the Orochi into its world. Mai tells Kyo that Rugal is out to unleash the Orochi. Kyo wants to confront Rugal, who destroyed his father's mental state.

At a hotel, Mai and Kyo meet up with Iori and Terry. Rugal is using the tournament dimension to merge it with the real world. After Mai blows her cover in front of Kyo, Iori puts on his Bluetooth headset and enters the tournament dimension to confront Rugal. There, he defeats Rugal's servants, Mature and Vice, only to have his mind consumed by the Orochi.

The next day, Kyo is lured into the tournament dimension, where he first fights Rugal and loses, but is allowed to live as a warning. Kyo brings out his ancestral sword and joins Chizuru and Terry into the tournament after Mai is dragged in by Rugal. When the four meet up, they are separated into different dimensions, with Kyo fighting Rugal, and Mai and Terry facing Mature and Vice. Rugal is about to decapitate Kyo, when Iori appears and intervenes. Rugal reveals to Kyo that several years back, he battled Saisyu, Chizuru, and Iori over control of the Orochi. During that fight, Iori allowed the Orochi to take over his body, defeating Rugal, but also destroying Saisyu's mental state by bashing his head against a wooden barrier several times. This leads to a fight between Kyo and Iori until Kyo slashes Iori in the back, releasing the Orochi from his body.

Disappointed by the outcome of the fight, Rugal sends Kyo, Iori, and Mai into another dimension to face them with his full potential. Chizuru and her multiple clones appear, revealing that she has found the mirror and the necklace. The heroes fail in their first attempt to combine the relics and trap Rugal, with Chizuru mortally wounded. Mai takes her place as the mirror holder, but as she, Kyo and Iori corner Rugal, they are once again overcome by his powers. Rugal destroys Kyo's sword, but as he is about to finish him off with a fireball, Kyo magically generates a new sword to block it. He then throws the sword and destroys Rugal.

Back in the real world, Scott places a lantern on the ocean in memory of Chizuru. Kyo decides to keep the family tradition by continuing with the tournament. He reflects on his late father's teachings while Iori stares at him from the other side of the pier.

== Cast ==
=== Savior Team ===
- Sean Faris as Kyo Kusanagi: A Japanese American motorcycle enthusiast and the son of Japanese martial artist Saisyu Kusanagi. He is also a descendant of the Kusanagi clan. Keanu Lam also portrays Kyo in his teen years. Faris spent a month learning how to use a katana in preparing for his role and took up basic Karate.
- Maggie Q as Mai Shiranui: An undercover CIA operative, MMA fighter, and the girlfriend of Iori.
- Will Yun Lee as Iori Yagami: a King of Fighters participant, a descendant of the Yagami clan, and the boyfriend of Mai.

=== Rugal Team ===
- Ray Park as Rugal Bernstein: A mysterious tyrannical fighter and leader of his own namesake K.O.F. team, the criminal from Europe takes over the King of Fighters dimension.
- Monique Ganderton as Mature: A femme fatale KOF participant and Vice's lover, who is lured into the tournament dimension and brainwashed by Rugal, her weapon of choice is a tonfa.
- Bernice Liu as Vice: She is the second femme fatale KOF participant and Mature's lover. Alongside Mature, she also becomes the enslaved servitress of Rugal.

=== Other fighters ===
- Françoise Yip as Chizuru Kagura: Descendant of the Kagura clan and host of the King of Fighters tournament. Due to a bullet injury, Mai takes Chizuru's place on the Savior Team with Iori and Kyo in the KOF tournament.
- Hiro Kanagawa as Saisyu Kusanagi: Descendant of the Kusanagi clan, the father of Kyo, and the keeper of the Kusanagi Sword. His appearance resembles that of Takuma Sakazaki from Art of Fighting.
- David Leitch as Terry Bogard: A skeptical CIA agent and amateur street fighter who investigates on the activities of the KOF tournament by being the assist fighter of the Savior Team. Leitch was also the film's fight choreographer.
- Sam Hargrave as Sam: a wealthy crime boss and Eskrima master from Australia who challenges Mai during her first match.

=== Non-canon characters ===
- Mike Dopud as CIA Agent
- Doug Abrahams as Mick O'Meara
- Candus Churchill as Berta
- Robin Nielsen as Junior Agent
- Scott Patey as Scott Hana
- Toshi Haraguchi as Takao Iwata

== Production ==
Filming began on November 3, 2008, at Aja Tan Studios, North Vancouver, British Columbia, Canada and finished on January 19, 2009.

== Reception ==
=== Release ===
The King of Fighters was released direct-to-DVD in the United States on September 7, 2010, through Vivendi Home Entertainment. It was re-released in the U.S. by Well Go USA Entertainment.

=== Criticism ===
Beyond Hollywood gave the film a negative review, saying that this movie:

"wastes a lot of unnecessary time trying to convince itself that the audience needs to know everything there is to know about its history (we don't, by the way), when it should have just accepted that it's a movie based on a 2D fighting game, spend 10 minutes tops on the explanations, and get to the fighting already."

Felix Vasquez, Jr. of Cinema Crazed gave the film one-and-a-half out of four stars, commenting:

"Yet another semi-classic video game from the nineties is butchered in to yet another half assed lazily made film"

== Reboot ==
Ledo Millennium announced that they are working with 37 Mutual Entertainment for new animated and live action adaptations of The King of Fighters.
