= Trump vs. the Illuminati =

- Film poster
- Directed by: BC Fourteen
- Written by: BC Fourteen
- Production company: Ruthless Studios
- Release date: October 6, 2020
- Running time: 1 hour 9 minutes
- Country: United States
- Language: English

Trump vs. the Illuminati is a 2020 adult animated science fiction comedy film directed by BC Fourteen. It follows a Chinese clone of Donald Trump, the 45th and 47th President of the United States, in a battle against an evil alien race known as the Illuminati. It received largely negative reviews from critics.

== Plot ==
In 2044, after advanced artificially-intelligent robots drain the earth of its natural resources, leaving nothing but a husk of a planet, humanity is forced to escape into space to fight for survival. A Chinese clone of Donald Trump survives the planet's destruction by escaping the maximum-security laboratory where he is kept and stowing away on the very last shuttle headed to space.

Trump's clone's ship crashes on Mars, leaving him alone for 999 years, which he spends joyriding in a Mars rover. Meanwhile, what is left of humanity fights against an alien race known as the Illuminati. Upon discovering that he is prophesized to destroy the Illuminati, the Trump clone joins forces with the surviving humans to bring the battle to the Illuminati's headquarters in Hell. In order to defeat the Illuminati, Trump's clone must battle Satan himself.

== Cast ==
- Rich Daigle as the narrator
- Timothy Banfield as Donald Trump's clone
- Marco Guzmán as Van Helsing
- Sophia Woods Stevens as Kali
- Edson Camacho as Dr. Jekyll
- Carlos Welos as Dr. Jekyll's assistant
- Robert Forth as Archon
- Carl Folds as Bort
- Neil Simmon as Heru
- Carrie Isaac as Varuna
- Wes Bruff as Crawley
- Simon Daigle as Flight Commander

== Reception ==
The film received very negative reviews. Some reviews called it "painstakingly and irrevocably bad", although others described it as "so bad, it's good". In 2021, Elisabeth Vincentelli from the New York Times linked the film's trailer but did not review it, stating that the premise alone was "pretty much all you need to know".

Samuel Williamson, of Collider, wrote: "It's a fever dream of an animated film that seems like it was made with free animation software and pumped out in a ridiculously short period of time. Every fantastical far-right fantasy that you can think of is probably in this movie. It's a terrible, terrible trip." while a review at Northern Lights stated: "there's something fascinatingly dense about how low the effort is." A review at Moria Reviews wrote: "The main problem with the film is that it has a thoroughly demented set-up that gets you sitting watching – but then has no idea what to do with any of it once the film starts. There is no real plot to anything that happens. Much of the film consists of Trump on a space journey to Hell (which would appear to be located in space) to confront The Devil. Nothing much happens along the way and the eventual confrontation ends up being flat. Moreover, the film has no real idea of satire – all there is to it is its wacky premise." Although the film was criticized for its poor voice acting in general, Banfield's performance as Donald Trump was praised by the website Horror Society as "pretty convincing", in an otherwise very negative review.

== See also ==
- Donald Trump in popular culture
