= Fat, Bald, Short Man =

2012 film

- Theatrical release poster
- Directed by: Carlos Osuna
- Written by: Carlos Osuna Juan Mauricio Ruiz Carlos Andrés Reyes
- Produced by: Jaime Osorio Gómez; Alejandro Prieto; Diego Hernandez; Jemay Herrera
- Starring: Álvaro Bayona; Fernando Arévalo; Julio Medina; Jairo Camargo; Ernesto Benjumea; Nicolás Montero; Sandra Reyes; Marcela Mar; Juan Manuel Combariza; Elkin Díaz
- Production companies: Malta Cine; Ciné-Sud Promotion; Perfect Circle Productions
- Release date: 30 September 2012
- Running time: 91 minutes
- Country: Colombia
- Language: Spanish

Fat, Bald, Short Man (Spanish: Gordo, calvo y bajito) is a 2012 Colombian adult animated comedy-drama film directed by Carlos Osuna (in his directorial debut) produced by Malta Cine. Osuna also co-wrote the screenplay along with Juan Mauricio Ruiz and Carlos Andrés Reyes. It was made using the rotoscoping technique.

It won and was screened at several film festivals around the world. On behalf of Guadalajara Construye, it received two awards at the Guadalajara International Film Festival, the Fix Communication Award and the Art Digital Award. And it has participated in festivals such as the Biarritz Film Festival, France in 2011; special mention at the Free Spirit Competition at the Warsaw Film Festival, Poland 2011, Havana, Bafici, Shanghai, Goa and Chicago, among many others. It was also part of the Animatopia section of the San Sebastián International Film Festival.

== Plot ==
Antonio Farfán, a civil servant in a notary's office, feels frustrated in several aspects, such as his work and his personal life, due to his appearance: he is fat, bald and short, and this has made him a victim of mockery and mistreatment. With the arrival of a new boss, fatter, balder and shorter, but successful, Antonio will have the opportunity to rethink the vision of the world that has been built by his appearance, thus facing his fears.

== Reception ==
Variety said, "The pic’s limited-animation artistry and oversimplistic storyline complement each other to reinvent the familiar: the fragile existence of a shy, middle-aged virgin with low self-esteem constantly battered by family and co-workers. Modest pic could pleasantly surprise at fests."

== See also ==
- Rotoscoping
