= Silver Circle (film) =

- Directed by: Pasha Roberts
- Written by: Steven Schwartz
- Produced by: Pasha Roberts; Ben Pugh
- Edited by: Ben Pugh
- Music by: Lee Strauss
- Production company: Lineplot Productions
- Distributed by: Area 23a
- Release date: March 22, 2013
- Running time: 90 minutes
- Country: United States
- Language: English
- Budget: $1.6 million
- Box office: $4,080

Silver Circle is a 2013 American animated thriller film. Set in a dystopian future, it follows a group called the Rebels, who have vowed to take down the Federal Reserve.

Silver Circle was given a limited release in the United States on March 22, 2013. The film drew criticism for its libertarian slant and for the quality of its animation.

== Reception ==
On Rotten Tomatoes, the film has an approval rating of 0% based on 6 reviews. On Metacritic, the film has a score of 21 out of 100 based on 6 critics, indicating "generally unfavorable reviews".
