= Micott & Basara =

Defunct Japanese film distributor

- Founded: 1997
- Defunct: 2011
- Fate: Bankruptcy
- Headquarters: Tokyo, Japan

Micott & Basara was a Japanese film production and film distributor company.

== Movies ==
- Appleseed (2004)
- Appleseed: Ex Machina (2007)
- Appleseed XIII (2011)

== Bankruptcy ==
On April 21, 2011, Teikoku Databank reported that Micott & Basara filed for voluntary bankruptcy at the Tokyo District Court after incurring 1.938 billion yen of debt at the end of March.
