= List of adult animated television series of the 1990s =

This is a list of adult animated television series of the 1990s (including streaming television series); that is, animated programs targeted towards audiences aged 18 and over in mind. Works in this medium could be considered adult for any number of reasons, which include the incorporation of explicit or suggestive sexual content, graphic violence, profane language, dark humour, or other thematic elements inappropriate for children. Works in this genre may explore philosophical, political, or social issues. Some productions are noted for their complex and/or experimental storytelling and animation techniques. Adult animation is typically defined as animation which skews toward adults. It is also described as something that "formative youths should stay far, far away from" or has adult humor and comes in various styles, but especially sitcoms and comedies. These animations can also "appeal to wide swaths of viewers," including those aged 18–34. AdWeek called adult animation "animated projects aimed at grown-ups, not kids."

In North America, there is children's animation, adult animation, and young adult animation, with various mature animations in the United States, especially in television series. This page mainly includes series in North America and Europe, on programming blocks such as Adult Swim, Animation Domination, Adult Swim (in Canada), and others, with other mature animations, including web series and animated films covered on other pages. These series should not be confused with cartoon pornography.

== List ==
=== United States ===
Title	Genre	Seasons/episodes	Show creator(s)	Original release	Network	Studio	Age rating	Technique	Source
Æon Flux	Avant-garde	3 seasons, 16 episodes	Peter Chung	November 30, 1991 – October 10, 1995	MTV	MTV Animation	TV-MA	Traditional	
Æon Flux	Science fiction	3 seasons, 16 episodes	Peter Chung	November 30, 1991 – October 10, 1995	MTV	MTV Animation	TV-MA	Traditional	
Liquid Television	Animation showcase	3 seasons, 27 episodes	Japhet Asher	November 30, 1991 – January 1, 1995	MTV	MTV Animation	TV-14	Traditional	
Liquid Television	Animation showcase	3 seasons, 27 episodes	Japhet Asher	November 30, 1991 – January 1, 1995	MTV	BBC Enterprises	TV-14	Traditional	
Liquid Television	Animation showcase	3 seasons, 27 episodes	Japhet Asher	November 30, 1991 – January 1, 1995	MTV	Colossal Pictures	TV-14	Traditional	
Liquid Television	Animation showcase	3 seasons, 27 episodes	Japhet Asher	November 30, 1991 – January 1, 1995	MTV	BIG Pictures	TV-14	Traditional	
Liquid Television	Animation showcase	3 seasons, 27 episodes	Japhet Asher	November 30, 1991 – January 1, 1995	MTV	Noyes & Laybourne Enterprises	TV-14	Traditional	
Capitol Critters	Comedy	1 season, 13 episodes	Nat Mauldin	January 28, 1992 – September 17, 1996	ABC	Hanna-Barbera	TV-PG	Traditional	
Capitol Critters	Comedy	1 season, 13 episodes	Steven Bochco	Cartoon Network	Steven Bochco Productions		TV-PG	Traditional	
Capitol Critters	Comedy	1 season, 13 episodes	Michael Wagner	Cartoon Network	20th Television		TV-PG	Traditional	
Fish Police	Crime	1 season, 6 episodes	based on the comic created by Steve Moncuse	February 28, 1992 – March 13, 1992	CBS	Hanna-Barbera	TV-PG	Traditional	
Fish Police	Comedy	1 season, 6 episodes	based on the comic created by Steve Moncuse	February 28, 1992 – March 13, 1992	CBS	Hanna-Barbera	TV-PG	Traditional	
The Specialists		1 season, 10 episodes		1992	MTV			Traditional	
Beavis and Butt-Head	Sitcom	11 seasons, 274 episodes	Mike Judge	Original series: March 8, 1993 – November 28, 1997	MTV	J.J. Sedelmaier Productions (Note: Season 1)	TV-14	Traditional	
Beavis and Butt-Head	Sitcom	11 seasons, 274 episodes	Mike Judge	Original series: March 8, 1993 – November 28, 1997	MTV	MTV Animation	TV-14	Traditional	
Beavis and Butt-Head	Sitcom	11 seasons, 274 episodes	Mike Judge	Revival series: October 27 – December 29, 2011	Comedy Central	Film Roman (Note: Season 8)	TV-14	Traditional	
Beavis and Butt-Head	Sitcom	11 seasons, 274 episodes	Mike Judge	2nd Revival series: August 4, 2022 – present	Paramount+	Judgemental Films	TV-14	Traditional	
Beavis and Butt-Head	Sitcom	11 seasons, 274 episodes	Mike Judge	2nd Revival series: August 4, 2022 – present	Paramount+	MTV Entertainment Studios	TV-14	Traditional	
Family Dog	Comedy	1 season, 10 episodes	Brad Bird	June 23, 1993 – July 28, 1993	CBS	• Nelvana • Amblin Television • Universal Television • Warner Bros. Television	TV-PG	Traditional	
The Critic	Sitcom	2 seasons, 23 episodes	Al Jean	January 26, 1994 – May 21, 1995	ABC (Note: Season 1)	Gracie Films	TV-14	Traditional	
The Critic	Sitcom	2 seasons, 23 episodes	Mike Reiss	January 26, 1994 – May 21, 1995	Fox (Note: Season 2)	Film Roman	TV-14	Traditional	
The Critic	Sitcom	2 seasons, 23 episodes	Mike Reiss	January 26, 1994 – May 21, 1995	Fox	Columbia Pictures Television	TV-14	Traditional	
The Critic	Sitcom	2 seasons, 23 episodes	Mike Reiss	January 26, 1994 – May 21, 1995	Fox	Rough Draft Studios	TV-14	Traditional	
Duckman	Sitcom	4 seasons, 70 episodes	Everett Peck	March 5, 1994 – September 6, 1997	USA Network	Klasky Csupo	TV-14	Traditional	
Duckman	Sitcom	4 seasons, 70 episodes	Everett Peck	March 5, 1994 – September 6, 1997	USA Network	Reno & Osburn Productions	TV-14	Traditional	
Duckman	Sitcom	4 seasons, 70 episodes	Everett Peck	March 5, 1994 – September 6, 1997	USA Network	Paramount Television	TV-14	Traditional	
Space Ghost Coast to Coast	Comedy	11 seasons, 110 episodes	Mike Lazzo	April 15, 1994 – May 31, 2008	Cartoon Network (Note: Seasons 1-6)	Ghost Planet Industries (Note: 1994–98)	TV-14	Traditional	
Space Ghost Coast to Coast	Comedy	11 seasons, 110 episodes	Mike Lazzo	April 15, 1994 – May 31, 2008	Adult Swim (Note: Seasons 7-9)	Williams Street (Note: 1999–2008)	TV-14		
Space Ghost Coast to Coast	Talk show	11 seasons, 110 episodes	Mike Lazzo	April 15, 1994 – May 31, 2008	Adult Swim	Williams Street	TV-14	Flash (Note: 1997-2008)	
Space Ghost Coast to Coast	Talk show	11 seasons, 110 episodes	Mike Lazzo	April 15, 1994 – May 31, 2008	GameTap (Note: Seasons 10-11)	Cartoon Network Studios (Note: 1994–2001)	TV-14	Flash	
The Head	Action	2 seasons, 14 episodes	Eric Fogel	September 1, 1994 – March 1, 1996	MTV	MTV Animation; MTV Productions	TV-14	Traditional	
The Head	Adventure	2 seasons, 14 episodes	Eric Fogel	September 1, 1994 – March 1, 1996	MTV	MTV Animation; MTV Productions	TV-14	Traditional	
The Maxx	Action	1 season, 13 episodes	Sam Kieth	April 8, 1995 – June 19, 1995	MTV	MTV Animation; MTV Productions		Traditional	
The Maxx	Adventure	1 season, 13 episodes	Bill Messner-Loebs	April 8, 1995 – June 19, 1995	MTV	MTV Animation; MTV Productions		Traditional	
Dr. Katz, Professional Therapist	Sitcom	6 seasons, 81 episodes	Jonathan Katz	May 28, 1995 – February 13, 2002	Comedy Central	HBO Downtown Productions	TV-PG	Traditional	
Dr. Katz, Professional Therapist	Sitcom	6 seasons, 81 episodes	Tom Snyder	May 28, 1995 – February 13, 2002	Comedy Central	Popular Arts Entertainment	TV-PG	Traditional	
Dr. Katz, Professional Therapist	Sitcom	6 seasons, 81 episodes	Tom Snyder	May 28, 1995 – February 13, 2002	Comedy Central	Tom Snyder Productions	TV-PG	Traditional	
The Ambiguously Gay Duo	Animation	1 season, 12 episodes	Robert Smigel; J. J. Sedelmaier	March 19, 1996 – May 15, 2011	ABC; NBC	J.J. Sedelmaier Productions, Inc.		Traditional	
King of the Hill	Sitcom	14 seasons, 269 episodes	Mike Judge	January 12, 1997 – present	Fox	Film Roman	TV-14	Traditional	
King of the Hill	Sitcom	14 seasons, 269 episodes	Greg Daniels	January 12, 1997 – present	Fox	3 Arts Entertainment	TV-14	Traditional	
King of the Hill	Sitcom	14 seasons, 269 episodes	Greg Daniels	January 12, 1997 – present	Fox	Deedle-Dee Productions	TV-14	Traditional	
King of the Hill	Sitcom	14 seasons, 269 episodes	Greg Daniels	January 12, 1997 – present	Fox	Judgemental Films	TV-14	Traditional	
King of the Hill	Sitcom	14 seasons, 269 episodes	Greg Daniels	January 12, 1997 – present	Fox	20th Television	TV-14	Traditional	
Daria	Sitcom	5 seasons, 65 episodes	Glenn Eichler	March 3, 1997 – January 21, 2002	MTV	Tenth Annual Industries	TV-14	Traditional	
Daria	Sitcom	5 seasons, 65 episodes	Susie Lewis	March 3, 1997 – January 21, 2002	MTV	MTV Animation	TV-14	Traditional	
Todd McFarlane's Spawn	Superhero	3 seasons, 18 episodes	Todd McFarlane	May 16, 1997 – May 28, 1999	HBO	HBO Animation	TV-MA	Traditional	
Todd McFarlane's Spawn	Drama	3 seasons, 18 episodes	Todd McFarlane	May 16, 1997 – May 28, 1999	HBO	HBO Animation	TV-MA	Traditional	
Spicy City	Science fiction	1 season, 6 episodes	Ralph Bakshi	July 11, 1997 – August 22, 1997	HBO	HBO Animation	TV-MA	Traditional	
South Park	Sitcom	25 seasons, 316 episodes	Trey Parker	August 13, 1997 – present	Comedy Central	Celluoid Studios (Note: 1997)	TV-MA	Stop-motion (Note: Pilot only)	
South Park	Sitcom	25 seasons, 316 episodes	Matt Stone	August 13, 1997 – present	Comedy Central	Braniff Productions (Note: 1997–2009)	TV-MA	Digital animation	
South Park	Sitcom	25 seasons, 316 episodes	Matt Stone	August 13, 1997 – present	Comedy Central	South Park Digital Studios, LLC. (Note: 2009–present)	TV-MA	Digital animation	
The Goddamn George Liquor Program	Drama	1 season, 8 episodes	John Kricfalusi	October 15, 1997 – 1998		Spümcø		Flash	
The PJs	Sitcom	3 seasons, 44 episodes	Eddie Murphy	January 10, 1999 – May 20, 2001	Fox (Note: Seasons 1-2)	Imagine Television	TV-14	Stop-Motion	
The PJs	Sitcom	3 seasons, 44 episodes	Larry Wilmore	January 10, 1999 – May 20, 2001	The WB (Note: Season 3)	Eddie Murphy Productions	TV-14	Stop-Motion	
The PJs	Sitcom	3 seasons, 44 episodes	Steve Tompkins	January 10, 1999 – May 20, 2001	The WB	Will Vinton Studios	TV-14	Stop-Motion	
The PJs	Sitcom	3 seasons, 44 episodes	Steve Tompkins	January 10, 1999 – May 20, 2001	The WB	Charged Productions (Note: 2000–01)	TV-14	Stop-Motion	
The PJs	Sitcom	3 seasons, 44 episodes	Steve Tompkins	January 10, 1999 – May 20, 2001	The WB	Touchstone Television (Note: Seasons 1-2)	TV-14	Stop-Motion	
The PJs	Sitcom	3 seasons, 44 episodes	Steve Tompkins	January 10, 1999 – May 20, 2001	The WB	Warner Bros. Television (Note: Season 3)	TV-14	Stop-Motion	
Dilbert	Sitcom	2 seasons, 30 episodes	based on the comic strip created by Scott Adams	January 25, 1999 – July 25, 2000	UPN	Idbox	TV-PG	Traditional	
Dilbert	Sitcom	2 seasons, 30 episodes	based on the comic strip created by Scott Adams	January 25, 1999 – July 25, 2000	UPN	United Media Productions	TV-PG	Traditional	
Dilbert	Sitcom	2 seasons, 30 episodes	based on the comic strip created by Scott Adams	January 25, 1999 – July 25, 2000	UPN	Columbia TriStar Television	TV-PG	Traditional	
Family Guy	Sitcom	24 seasons, 445 episodes	Seth MacFarlane	January 31, 1999 – present	Fox	Fuzzy Door Productions	TV-MA	Traditional (Digital ink-and-paint, and color) (Note: seasons 1-11)	
Family Guy	Sitcom	24 seasons, 445 episodes	Seth MacFarlane	January 31, 1999 – present	Fox	20th Television Animation	TV-MA	Flash (Note: season 1-present)	
Family Guy	Sitcom	24 seasons, 445 episodes	Seth MacFarlane	January 31, 1999 – present	Fox	20th Television	TV-MA	Toon Boom (Note: season 1-present)	
Station Zero	Comedy	1 season, 20 episodes	Tramp Daly	March 8, 1999 – April 6, 1999	MTV	Possible Worlds	TV-14	Traditional	
Station Zero	Musical	1 season, 20 episodes	Tramp Daly	March 8, 1999 – April 6, 1999	MTV	C-Traze Studios	TV-14	Traditional	
Station Zero	Musical	1 season, 20 episodes	Tramp Daly	March 8, 1999 – April 6, 1999	MTV	Upfront Entertainment	TV-14		
Station Zero	Musical	1 season, 20 episodes	Tramp Daly	March 8, 1999 – April 6, 1999	MTV	MTV Animation	TV-14		
Futurama	Science fiction	10 seasons, 170 episodes	Matt Groening	March 28, 1999 – present	Fox (Note: Seasons 1-4)	The Curiosity Company	TV-14	Traditional (Digital ink-and-paint, and color)	
Futurama	Sitcom	10 seasons, 170 episodes	Matt Groening	March 28, 1999 – present	Comedy Central (Note: Seasons 5-7)	20th Television (Note: credited as 30th Century Fox Television)	TV-14	Traditional (Digital ink-and-paint, and color)	
Futurama	Sitcom	10 seasons, 170 episodes	Matt Groening	March 28, 1999 – present	Hulu (Note: Season 8)	20th Television Animation (Note: credited as 30th Television Animation)	TV-14	Traditional (Digital ink-and-paint, and color)	
Home Movies	Sitcom	4 seasons, 52 episodes	Brendon Small	April 26, 1999 – April 4, 2004	UPN (1999-2001); Adult Swim (2001-2004)	Burns & Burns Productions	TV-PG	Traditional (Note: season 1); Flash (Note: seasons 2-4)	
The Dick & Paula Celebrity Special	Comedy	1 season, 7 episodes	Tom Snyder	July 20, 1999 – August 1999	FX	Soup2Nuts	TV-14	Traditional	
Downtown	Comedy	1 season, 13 episodes	Chris Prynoski	August 3 – November 8, 1999	MTV	MTV Animation	TV-14	Traditional	
Cita's World	Music		Trayce Z. Zinzer	September 20, 1999 – January 3, 2003	BET		TV-PG	CGI	
Mission Hill	Sitcom	1 season, 13 episodes	Bill Oakley	September 24, 1999 – August 11, 2002	The WB	Bill Oakley	TV-14	Traditional	
Mission Hill	Sitcom	1 season, 13 episodes	Josh Weinstein	September 24, 1999 – August 11, 2002	Adult Swim	Josh Weinstein Productions	TV-14	Traditional	
Mission Hill	Sitcom	1 season, 13 episodes	Josh Weinstein	September 24, 1999 – August 11, 2002	Adult Swim	Castle Rock Entertainment	TV-14	Traditional	

=== United Kingdom ===
Title	Genre	Seasons/episodes	Show creator(s)	Original release	Network	Studio	Technique	Source
Wicked Willie	Comedy	1 season, 11 episodes		1990 – 1991	Channel 5		Traditional	
Crapston Villas	Satire	2 seasons, 20 episodes	Sarah Ann Kennedy	October 27, 1995 – January 19, 1998	Channel 4	Spitting Image	Stop-Motion	
Crapston Villas	Black Comedy	2 seasons, 20 episodes	Sarah Ann Kennedy	October 27, 1995 – January 19, 1998	Channel 4	Spitting Image	Stop-Motion	
Crapston Villas	Soap Opera	2 seasons, 20 episodes	Sarah Ann Kennedy	October 27, 1995 – January 19, 1998	Channel 4	Spitting Image	Stop-Motion	
Pond Life	Comedy	2 seasons, 21 episodes	Candy Guard	December 2, 1996 – October 10, 2000	Channel 4	Collingwood & Co.	Traditional	
Angry Kid	Comedy	4 seasons, 66 episodes	Darren Walsh	December 5, 1998 – November 8, 2019	Atom.com	Aardman Animations	Stop-motion/Live-action	
Angry Kid	Comedy	4 seasons, 66 episodes	Darren Walsh	December 5, 1998 – November 8, 2019	YouTube	Mr. Morris Productions	Stop-motion/Live-action	
Angry Kid	Comedy	4 seasons, 66 episodes	Darren Walsh	December 5, 1998 – November 8, 2019	Channel 4 (Note: Seasons 1-2)	Mr. Morris Productions	Stop-motion/Live-action	
Angry Kid	Comedy	4 seasons, 66 episodes	Darren Walsh	December 5, 1998 – November 8, 2019	BBC Three (Note: Special)	Mr. Morris Productions		
Rex the Runt	Comedy	2 seasons, 26 episodes	Richard Goleszowski	December 21, 1998 – December 16, 2001	BBC Two	Aardman Animations	Stop-motion/Live-action	
Rex the Runt	Comedy	2 seasons, 26 episodes	Richard Goleszowski	December 21, 1998 – December 16, 2001	BBC Two	BBC Bristol	Stop-motion/Live-action	
Rex the Runt	Comedy	2 seasons, 26 episodes	Richard Goleszowski	December 21, 1998 – December 16, 2001	BBC Two	Egmont Imagination	Stop-motion/Live-action	
Rex the Runt	Comedy	2 seasons, 26 episodes	Richard Goleszowski	December 21, 1998 – December 16, 2001	BBC Two	EVA Entertainment	Stop-motion/Live-action	

=== Canada ===
Title	Genre	Seasons/episodes	Show creator(s)	Original release	Network	Studio	Technique	Source
Le JourNul	Satire	1 season, 360 episodes	Prix Gémeaux	1999 – 2001	TVA	Groupe TVA	CGI	
Kevin Spencer	Black comedy	8 seasons, 113 episodes	Greg Lawrence	January 17, 1999 – November 6, 2005	The Comedy Network	Ocnus Productions; Atomic Productions	Flash	

=== Latin America and Brazil ===
Title	Country	Genre	Seasons/episodes	Show creator(s)	Original release	Network	Studio	Source
El Siguiente Programa	Colombia	Comedy	5 seasons, 93 episodes	Santiago Moure	October 29, 1997 – September 1, 2000	Canal A (Note: Season 1) Canal 1 (Note: Seasons 2-4)	Gaira	
El Siguiente Programa	Colombia	Satire	5 seasons, 93 episodes	Martín de Francisco	November 14, 2019	Canal A Canal 1	Conexión Creativa Cenpro Televisión	
Mercano El Marciano	Argentina	Satire Science fiction	1 season, 40 episodes	Juan Antin, Ayar B	1998 – 2000	MuchMusic	Malcriados	

=== Co-productions ===
Title	Country	Genre	Seasons/episodes	Show creator(s)	Original release	Network	Studio	Source
The Brothers Grunt	Canada	Comedy	1 season, 35 episodes	Danny Antonucci	August 15, 1994 – April 9, 1995	MTV	a.k.a. Cartoon	
The Brothers Grunt	United States	Comedy	1 season, 35 episodes	Danny Antonucci	August 15, 1994 – April 9, 1995	MTV	MTV Animation	
Robin	Canada	Slapstick comedy	1 season, 30 episodes	Magnus Carlsson	1996	SVT1	TMO Film GmbH	
Robin	Germany	Slapstick comedy	1 season, 30 episodes	Magnus Carlsson	1996	SVT1	Nelvana	
Robin	Sweden	Slapstick comedy	1 season, 30 episodes	Magnus Carlsson	1996	SVT1	Nelvana	
Cartoon Sushi	Canada	Animation showcase	1 season, 15 episodes	Danny Antonucci	1997 – 1998	MTV	a.k.a. Cartoon	
Cartoon Sushi	United States	Animation showcase	1 season, 15 episodes	Keith Alcorn	1997 – 1998	MTV	MTV Animation	
Cartoon Sushi	United States	Animation showcase	1 season, 15 episodes	Keith Alcorn	1997 – 1998	MTV	D.N.A. Productions	
O Canada	Canada	Anthology	1 season, 13 episodes	Bob Jaques	March 5, 1997 – December 30, 2002	Cartoon Network	Cartoon Network Productions	
O Canada	United States	Anthology	1 season, 13 episodes	Kelly Armstrong	March 5, 1997 – December 30, 2002	Cartoon Network	Cartoon Network Productions	
O Canada	United States	Anthology	1 season, 13 episodes	Glen Kennedy	March 5, 1997 – December 30, 2002	Cartoon Network	Cartoon Network Productions	
Stressed Eric	United Kingdom	Black comedy	2 seasons, 13 episodes	Carl Gorham	April 20, 1998 – October 11, 2000	BBC Two	Klasky Csupo (Note: season 1)	
Stressed Eric	United States (Note: season 1)	Sitcom	2 seasons, 13 episodes	Carl Gorham	April 20, 1998 – October 11, 2000	NBC (Note: season 1)	Absolutely Productions	
Stressed Eric	Hungary (Note: season 2)	Satire	2 seasons, 13 episodes	Carl Gorham	April 20, 1998 – October 11, 2000	NBC	Absolutely Productions	
Celebrity Deathmatch	Canada (Note: Revival series)	Sports entertainment	6 seasons, 93 episodes	Eric Fogel	Original series: May 14, 1998 –June 6, 2002	MTV (Note: Original series)	MTV Animation	
Celebrity Deathmatch	United States	Parody	6 seasons, 93 episodes	Eric Fogel	Revival series: June 10, 2006 – March 30, 2007	MTV2 (Note: Revival series)	Cuppa Coffee Studios (Note: 2006–07)	
Celebrity Deathmatch	United States	Parody	6 seasons, 93 episodes	Eric Fogel	Revival series: June 10, 2006 – March 30, 2007	The Comedy Network (Note: Revival series)	Cuppa Coffee Studios	
Bob and Margaret	Canada	Comedy	4 seasons, 52 episodes	David Fine	June 22, 1998 – December 25, 2001	Comedy Central	Philippines Animation Studio	
Bob and Margaret	Canada	Comedy	4 seasons, 52 episodes	David Fine	June 22, 1998 – December 25, 2001	Global	Philippines Animation Studio	
Bob and Margaret	United Kingdom	Comedy	4 seasons, 52 episodes	Alison Snowden	June 22, 1998 – December 25, 2001	Global	Philippines Animation Studio	
Bob and Margaret	United Kingdom	Comedy	4 seasons, 52 episodes	Alison Snowden	June 22, 1998 – December 25, 2001	Channel 4	Nelvana	
Bob and Margaret	Philippines	Comedy	4 seasons, 52 episodes	Alison Snowden	June 22, 1998 – December 25, 2001	Channel 4	Nelvana	

== See also ==
- List of adult animated television series
  - List of adult animated television series of the 2000s
  - List of adult animated television series of the 2010s
  - List of adult animated television series of the 2020s
- LGBT representation in adult animation
- Modern animation in the United States
- Lists of animated feature films
- Independent animation
- Animation in the United States in the television era
- Cartoon violence
