= List of adult animated television series of the 2020s =

This is a list of adult animated television series of the 2020s (including streaming television series); that is, animated programs targeted towards audiences aged 18 years and over. Works in this medium could be considered adult for any number of reasons, which include the incorporation of explicit or suggestive sexual content, graphic violence, profane language, dark humour, or other thematic elements inappropriate for children. Works in this genre may explore philosophical, political, or social issues. Some productions are noted for their complex and/or experimental storytelling and animation techniques. Adult animation is typically defined as animation which skews toward teen/adult audiences. It is also described as something that "formative youths should stay far, far away from" or has adult humor and comes in various styles, but especially sitcoms and comedies. These animations can also "appeal to wide swaths of viewers," including those aged 18–34. AdWeek called adult animation "animated projects aimed at grown-ups, not kids."

In North America, there is children's animation, adult animation, and young adult animation, with various mature animations in the United States, especially in television series. This page mainly includes series in North America and Europe, on programming blocks such as Adult Swim, Animation Domination and others, with other mature animations, including web series and animated films covered on other pages. These series should not be confused with cartoon pornography.

== List ==
=== United States ===
Title	Genre	Seasons/episodes	Show creator(s)	Original release	Network	Studio	Age rating	Technique	Source	
Magical Girl Friendship Squad: Origins	Comedy	1 season, 6 episodes	Kelsey Stephanides	January 1, 2020	Syfy	Cartuna	TV-MA	Flash		
Deathstroke: Knights & Dragons	Action	1 season, 2 episodes	J. M. DeMatteis	January 6 – November 24, 2020	CW Seed	Warner Bros. Animation	TV-14	Traditional		
Deathstroke: Knights & Dragons	Adventure	1 season, 2 episodes	J. M. DeMatteis	January 6 – November 24, 2020	CW Seed	Blue Ribbon Content	TV-14	Traditional		
Deathstroke: Knights & Dragons	Superhero	1 season, 2 episodes	J. M. DeMatteis	January 6 – November 24, 2020	CW Seed	DC Entertainment	TV-14	Traditional		
Deathstroke: Knights & Dragons	Superhero	1 season, 2 episodes	J. M. DeMatteis	January 6 – November 24, 2020	CW Seed	Berlanti Productions	TV-14	Traditional		
Duncanville	Animated sitcom	3 seasons, 39 episodes	Mike Scully	February 16, 2020 – October 18, 2022	Fox (Note: Last six episodes were released on Hulu)	Bento Box Entertainment	TV-14	Traditional		
Duncanville	Animated sitcom	3 seasons, 39 episodes	Julie Thacker Scully	February 16, 2020 – October 18, 2022	Fox	Paper Kite Productions	TV-14	Traditional		
Duncanville	Animated sitcom	3 seasons, 39 episodes	Julie Thacker Scully	February 16, 2020 – October 18, 2022	Fox	Scullys	TV-14	Traditional		
Duncanville	Animated sitcom	3 seasons, 39 episodes	Julie Thacker Scully	February 16, 2020 – October 18, 2022	Fox	3 Arts Entertainment	TV-14	Traditional		
Duncanville	Animated sitcom	3 seasons, 39 episodes	Amy Poehler	February 16, 2020 – October 18, 2022	Fox	Universal Television	TV-14	Traditional		
Duncanville	Animated sitcom	3 seasons, 39 episodes	Amy Poehler	February 16, 2020 – October 18, 2022	Fox	Fox Entertainment	TV-14	Traditional		
Duncanville	Animated sitcom	3 seasons, 39 episodes	Amy Poehler	February 16, 2020 – October 18, 2022	Fox	20th Television Animation	TV-14	Traditional		
Tooning Out The News	Variety	3 seasons, 263 episodes	Stephen Colbert	April 7, 2020 – May 3, 2023	Paramount+, Comedy Central	Spartina Productions	TV-14	Flash/Live-Action		
Tooning Out The News	News parody	3 seasons, 263 episodes	Chris Licht	April 7, 2020 – May 3, 2023	Paramount+, Comedy Central	Licht Media Solutions	TV-14	Flash/Live-Action		
Tooning Out The News	Political satire	3 seasons, 263 episodes	R. J. Fried	April 7, 2020 – May 3, 2023	Paramount+, Comedy Central	RJ Fried Worldwide	TV-14	Flash/Live-Action		
Tooning Out The News	Comedy	3 seasons, 263 episodes	Tim Luecke	April 7, 2020 – May 3, 2023	Paramount+, Comedy Central	CBS Studios	TV-14	Flash/Live-Action		
Tooning Out The News	Comedy	3 seasons, 263 episodes	Zack Smilovitz	April 7, 2020 – May 3, 2023	Paramount+, Comedy Central	CBS Studios	TV-14	Flash/Live-Action		
Tooning Out The News	Comedy	3 seasons, 263 episodes	Mike Leech	April 7, 2020 – May 3, 2023	Paramount+, Comedy Central	CBS Studios	TV-14	Flash/Live-Action		
The Midnight Gospel	Science fantasy	1 season, 8 episodes	Pendleton Ward	April 20, 2020	Netflix	Oatmeal Madien	TV-MA	Flash/Traditional		
The Midnight Gospel	Surrealism	1 season, 8 episodes	Pendleton Ward	April 20, 2020	Netflix	Oatmeal Madien	TV-MA	Flash/Traditional		
The Midnight Gospel	Dark comedy	1 season, 8 episodes	Duncan Trussell	April 20, 2020	Netflix	Titmouse, Inc.	TV-MA	Flash/Traditional		
The Midnight Gospel	Adventure	1 season, 8 episodes	Duncan Trussell	April 20, 2020	Netflix	Titmouse, Inc.	TV-MA	Flash/Traditional		
Solar Opposites	Animated sitcom	6 seasons, 63 episodes	Justin Roiland	May 8, 2020 – October 13, 2025	Hulu	20th Television Animation	TV-MA	Flash		
Solar Opposites	Science fiction	6 seasons, 63 episodes	Mike McMahan	May 8, 2020 – October 13, 2025	Hulu	Important Science	TV-MA	Flash		
Solar Opposites	Science fiction	6 seasons, 63 episodes	Mike McMahan	May 8, 2020 – October 13, 2025	Hulu	Justin Roiland's Solo Vanity Card Productions!	TV-MA	Flash		
JJ Villard's Fairy Tales	Black comedy	1 season, 6 episodes	JJ Villard	May 11 – June 15, 2020	Adult Swim	Villard Film	TV-MA	Traditional		
JJ Villard's Fairy Tales	Comedy horror	1 season, 6 episodes	JJ Villard	May 11 – June 15, 2020	Adult Swim	Williams Street	TV-MA	Traditional		
JJ Villard's Fairy Tales	Surreal humour	1 season, 6 episodes	JJ Villard	May 11 – June 15, 2020	Adult Swim	Cartoon Network Studios	TV-MA	Traditional		
Central Park	Animated sitcom	3 seasons, 39 episodes	Josh Gad	May 29, 2020 – November 18, 2022	Apple TV+	Bento Box Entertainment	TV-PG	Traditional		
Central Park	Animated sitcom	3 seasons, 39 episodes	Loren Bouchard	May 29, 2020 – November 18, 2022	Apple TV+	Wilo Productions	TV-PG	Traditional		
Central Park	Animated sitcom	3 seasons, 39 episodes	Loren Bouchard	May 29, 2020 – November 18, 2022	Apple TV+	Angry Child Productions	TV-PG	Traditional		
Central Park	Musical	3 seasons, 39 episodes	Nora Smith	May 29, 2020 – November 18, 2022	Apple TV+	Brillstein Entertainment Partners	TV-PG	Traditional		
Central Park	Musical	3 seasons, 39 episodes	Nora Smith	May 29, 2020 – November 18, 2022	Apple TV+	20th Television Animation	TV-PG	Traditional		
Crossing Swords	Animated sitcom	2 seasons, 20 episodes	John Harvatine IV	June 12, 2020 – December 10, 2021	Hulu	Sony Pictures Television	TV-MA	Stop-Motion		
Crossing Swords	Fantasy	2 seasons, 20 episodes	Tom Root	June 12, 2020 – December 10, 2021	Hulu	Buddy Systems	TV-MA	Stop-Motion		
Crossing Swords	Adventure	2 seasons, 20 episodes	Tom Root	June 12, 2020 – December 10, 2021	Hulu	Tom is Awesome	TV-MA	Stop-Motion		
Crossing Swords	Black comedy	2 seasons, 20 episodes	Tom Root	June 12, 2020 – December 10, 2021	Hulu	Stoopid Buddy Stoodios	TV-MA	Stop-Motion		
Close Enough	Sitcom	3 seasons, 24 episodes	J.G. Quintel	July 9, 2020 – April 7, 2022	HBO Max	Cartoon Network Studios	TV-14	Traditional		
Dicktown	Animated sitcom	2 seasons, 20 episodes	John Hodgman	July 9, 2020 – March 31, 2022	FXX	SLAQR; FXP	TV-MA	Flash		
Star Trek: Lower Decks	Comedy	5 seasons, 50 episodes	Mike McMahan	August 6, 2020 – December 19, 2024	Paramount+	CBS Eye Animation Productions	TV-14	Traditional		
Star Trek: Lower Decks	Comedy	5 seasons, 50 episodes	Mike McMahan	August 6, 2020 – December 19, 2024	Paramount+	Secret Hideout	TV-14	Traditional		
Star Trek: Lower Decks	Science fiction	5 seasons, 50 episodes	Mike McMahan	August 6, 2020 – December 19, 2024	Paramount+	Important Science	TV-14	Traditional		
Star Trek: Lower Decks	Science fiction	5 seasons, 50 episodes	Mike McMahan	August 6, 2020 – December 19, 2024	Paramount+	Titmouse, Inc.	TV-14	Traditional		
YOLO	Comedy	3 seasons, 24 episodes	Michael Cusack	August 10, 2020 – April 28, 2025	Adult Swim	Princess Pictures	TV-14	Flash		
YOLO	Comedy	3 seasons, 24 episodes	Michael Cusack	August 10, 2020 – April 28, 2025	Adult Swim	Williams Street	TV-14	Flash		
Hoops	Animated sitcom	1 season, 10 episodes	Ben Hoffman	August 21, 2020	Netflix	Bento Box Entertainment	TV-MA	Flash		
Hoops	Comedy	1 season, 10 episodes	Ben Hoffman	August 21, 2020	Netflix	Pepper Hill Productions	TV-MA	Flash		
Hoops	Comedy	1 season, 10 episodes	Ben Hoffman	August 21, 2020	Netflix	Walcott Company	TV-MA	Flash		
Hoops	Comedy	1 season, 10 episodes	Ben Hoffman	August 21, 2020	Netflix	Lord Miller Productions	TV-MA	Flash		
Hoops	Comedy	1 season, 10 episodes	Ben Hoffman	August 21, 2020	Netflix	20th Century Fox Television	TV-MA	Flash		
Magical Girl Friendship Squad	Comedy	1 season, 6 episodes	Kelsey Stephanides	September 26 – October 31, 2020	Syfy	Cartuna	TV-MA	Flash		
Wild Life	Comedy	1 season, 6 episodes	Adam Davies	September 26 – October 31, 2020	Syfy	Nice Try.	TV-MA	Flash		
Wild Life	Comedy	1 season, 6 episodes	Adam Davies	September 26 – October 31, 2020	Syfy	Octopie Network	TV-MA	Flash		
Wild Life	Comedy	1 season, 6 episodes	Adam Davies	September 26 – October 31, 2020	Syfy	Valparaiso Pictures	TV-MA	Flash		
Wild Life	Comedy	1 season, 6 episodes	Adam Davies	September 26 – October 31, 2020	Syfy	TZGZ Productions	TV-MA	Flash		
Blood of Zeus	Drama	3 seasons, 24 episodes	Charley Parlapanides	October 27, 2020 – May 8, 2025	Netflix	Powerhouse Animation Studios	TV-MA	Traditional		
Blood of Zeus	Dark fantasy	3 seasons, 24 episodes	Vlas Parlapanides	October 27, 2020 – May 8, 2025	Netflix	Powerhouse Animation Studios	TV-MA	Traditional		
Helluva Boss	Black comedy	2 seasons, 21 episodes	Vivienne Medrano	October 31, 2020	YouTube	SpindleHorse Toons	TV-MA	Traditional		
Helluva Boss	Comedy drama	2 seasons, 21 episodes	Vivienne Medrano	October 31, 2020	YouTube	SpindleHorse Toons	TV-MA	Traditional		
Helluva Boss	Fantasy	2 seasons, 21 episodes	Vivienne Medrano	October 31, 2020	Amazon Prime Video	SpindleHorse Toons	TV-MA	Traditional		
Helluva Boss	Musical	2 seasons, 21 episodes	Vivienne Medrano	October 31, 2020	Amazon Prime Video	SpindleHorse Toons	TV-MA	Traditional		
The Liberator	Drama	1 season, 4 episodes	Jeb Stuart	November 11, 2020	Netflix	A&E Studios	TV-MA	Rotoscoping		
The Liberator	Drama	1 season, 4 episodes	Jeb Stuart	November 11, 2020	Netflix	Unique Features	TV-MA	Rotoscoping		
Onyx Equinox	Action	1 season, 12 episodes	Sofia Alexander	November 21 – December 26, 2020	Crunchyroll	Crunchyroll Studios	TV-MA	Traditional		
Onyx Equinox	Adventure	1 season, 12 episodes	Sofia Alexander	November 21 – December 26, 2020	Crunchyroll	Crunchyroll Studios	TV-MA	Traditional		
Onyx Equinox	Science fantasy	1 season, 12 episodes	Sofia Alexander	November 21 – December 26, 2020	Crunchyroll	Crunchyroll Studios	TV-MA	Traditional		
The Great North	Comedy	5 seasons, 97 episodes	Lizzie Molyneux-Logelin	January 3, 2021 – September 14, 2025	Fox	Bento Box Entertainment	TV-14	Traditional		
The Great North	Comedy	5 seasons, 97 episodes	Wendy Molyneux	January 3, 2021 – September 14, 2025	Fox	Double Molyneux Sister Sheux	TV-14	Traditional		
The Great North	Sitcom	5 seasons, 97 episodes	Wendy Molyneux	January 3, 2021 – September 14, 2025	Fox	Wilo Productions	TV-14	Traditional		
The Great North	Sitcom	5 seasons, 97 episodes	Minty Lewis	January 3, 2021 – September 14, 2025	Fox	Fox Entertainment	TV-14	Traditional		
The Great North	Sitcom	5 seasons, 97 episodes	Minty Lewis	January 3, 2021 – September 14, 2025	Fox	20th Television Animation	TV-14	Traditional		
Devil May Care	Comedy	1 season, 7 episodes	Douglas Goldstein	February 6 – March 31, 2021	Syfy	Titmouse, Inc.	TV-MA	Flash		
Devil May Care	Comedy	1 season, 7 episodes	Amanda Miller	February 6 – March 31, 2021	Syfy	Titmouse, Inc.	TV-MA	Flash		
Pacific Rim: The Black	Action	2 seasons, 14 episodes	Craig Kyle	March 4, 2021 – April 19, 2022	Netflix	Legendary Television	TV-14	CGI		
Pacific Rim: The Black	Action	2 seasons, 14 episodes	Greg Johnson	March 4, 2021 – April 19, 2022	Netflix	Polygon Pictures	TV-14	CGI		
The Pole	Comedy	1 season, 6 episodes	Matthew Bass	March 17 – April 21, 2021	Syfy	Yeti Farm	TV-MA	Flash		
The Pole	Comedy	1 season, 6 episodes	Theodore Bressman	March 17 – April 21, 2021	Syfy	Yeti Farm	TV-MA	Flash		
The Summoner	Comedy	1 season, 6 episodes	Charlie Hankin	March 17 – April 21, 2021	Syfy	Stoopid Buddy Stoodios	TV-MA	Flash		
Dota: Dragon's Blood	Action	3 books, 24 episodes	Ashley Miller	March 25, 2021 – August 11, 2022	Netflix	Studio Mir	TV-MA	Traditional		
Dota: Dragon's Blood	Action	3 books, 24 episodes	Ashley Miller	March 25, 2021 – August 11, 2022	Netflix	Kaiju Boulevard	TV-MA	Traditional		
Invincible	Superhero	4 seasons, 32 episodes	Robert Kirkman	March 26, 2021 – present	Amazon Prime Video	Skybound Entertainment	TV-MA	Traditional		
Invincible	Action	4 seasons, 32 episodes	Robert Kirkman	March 26, 2021 – present	Amazon Prime Video	Skybound North	TV-MA	Traditional		
Invincible	Adventure	4 seasons, 32 episodes	Robert Kirkman	March 26, 2021 – present	Amazon Prime Video	Amazon Studios	TV-MA	Traditional		
Invincible	Drama	4 seasons, 32 episodes	Robert Kirkman	March 26, 2021 – present	Amazon Prime Video	Point Grey Pictures	TV-MA	Traditional		
Invincible	Science fiction	4 seasons, 32 episodes	Robert Kirkman	March 26, 2021 – present	Amazon Prime Video	Wind Sun Sky Entertainment	TV-MA	Traditional		
Invincible	Thriller	4 seasons, 32 episodes	Robert Kirkman	March 26, 2021 – present	Amazon Prime Video	Wind Sun Sky Entertainment	TV-MA	Traditional		
Birdgirl	Comedy	2 seasons, 12 episodes	Michael Ouweleen	April 4, 2021 – July 17, 2022	Adult Swim	Awesome Inc (season 1)	TV-14	Flash		
Birdgirl	Comedy	2 seasons, 12 episodes	Michael Ouweleen	April 4, 2021 – July 17, 2022	Adult Swim	Global Mechanic (season 2)	TV-14	Flash		
Birdgirl	Superhero	2 seasons, 12 episodes	Erik Richter	April 4, 2021 – July 17, 2022	Adult Swim	Bedford Avenue	TV-MA (Note: One Episode)	Flash		
Birdgirl	Superhero	2 seasons, 12 episodes	Erik Richter	April 4, 2021 – July 17, 2022	Adult Swim	Williams Street	TV-MA	Flash		
M.O.D.O.K.	Sitcom	1 season, 10 episodes	Jordan Blum	May 21, 2021	Hulu	10k	TV-MA	Stop-Motion		
M.O.D.O.K.	Science Fiction	1 season, 10 episodes	Jordan Blum	May 21, 2021	Hulu	Multiverse Cowboy	TV-MA	Stop-Motion		
M.O.D.O.K.	Superhero	1 season, 10 episodes	Jordan Blum	May 21, 2021	Hulu	Stoopid Buddy Stoodies	TV-MA	Stop-Motion		
M.O.D.O.K.	Action	1 season, 10 episodes	Patton Oswalt	May 21, 2021	Hulu	Marvel Television	TV-MA	Stop-Motion		
HouseBroken	Animated sitcom	2 seasons, 30 episodes	Gabrielle Allan	May 31, 2021 – August 6, 2023	Fox	Kapital Entertainment	TV-14	Traditional		
HouseBroken	Animated sitcom	2 seasons, 30 episodes	Jennifer Crittenden	May 31, 2021 – August 6, 2023	Fox	Bento Box Entertainment	TV-14	Traditional		
HouseBroken	Animated sitcom	2 seasons, 30 episodes	Clea DuVall	May 31, 2021 – August 6, 2023	Fox	Merman	TV-14	Traditional		
HouseBroken	Animated sitcom	2 seasons, 30 episodes	Clea DuVall	May 31, 2021 – August 6, 2023	Fox	AllenDen	TV-14	Traditional		
Woman in the Book	Comedy-horror	1 season, 10 episodes		June 4 – August 6, 2021	Facebook Watch	Starburns Industries; Crypt TV		Flash		
The Goodbye Family: The Animated Series	Comedy	4 seasons, 27 episodes	Lorin Morgan-Richards	June 26, 2021 – present	Tubi		TV-PG	Flash		
The Goodbye Family: The Animated Series	Western	4 seasons, 27 episodes	Lorin Morgan-Richards	June 26, 2021 – present	Amazon Prime Video		TV-PG	Flash		
Ultra City Smiths	Comedy drama	1 season, 6 episodes	Steve Conrad	July 22, 2021 – present	AMC	Stoopid Buddy Stoodios	TV-14	Stop-Motion		
Ultra City Smiths	Crime	1 season, 6 episodes	Steve Conrad	July 22, 2021 – present	AMC	AMC Studios	TV-14	Stop-Motion		
Masters of the Universe	Superhero; Fantasy	2 seasons, 15 episodes	Kevin Smith	July 23, 2021 – January 25, 2024	Netflix	Powerhouse Animation Studios; Mattel Television	TV-PG	Traditional		
The Prince	Comedy	1 season, 12 episodes	Gary Janetti	July 29, 2021	HBO Max	20th Television	TV-MA	Flash		
The Prince	Comedy	1 season, 12 episodes	Gary Janetti	July 29, 2021	HBO Max	Nickelby, Inc.	TV-MA	Flash		
What If...?	Action-adventure	3 season, 26 episodes	A.C. Bradley	August 11, 2021 – December 29, 2024	Disney+	Marvel Studios	TV-14	CGI		
What If...?	Anthology	3 season, 26 episodes	A.C. Bradley	August 11, 2021 – December 29, 2024	Disney+	Marvel Studios	TV-14	CGI		
What If...?	Science fiction	3 season, 26 episodes	A.C. Bradley	August 11, 2021 – December 29, 2024	Disney+	Marvel Studios	TV-14	CGI		
What If...?	Superhero	3 season, 26 episodes	A.C. Bradley	August 11, 2021 – December 29, 2024	Disney+	Marvel Studios	TV-14	CGI		
Q-Force	Spy-fi	1 season, 10 episodes	Gabe Liedman	September 2, 2021	Netflix	Universal Television	TV-MA	Flash		
Q-Force	Action	1 season, 10 episodes	Gabe Liedman	September 2, 2021	Netflix	Hazy Mills Productions	TV-MA	Flash		
Q-Force	Comedy	1 season, 10 episodes	Gabe Liedman	September 2, 2021	Netflix	3 Arts Entertainment	TV-MA	Flash		
Q-Force	Comedy	1 season, 10 episodes	Gabe Liedman	September 2, 2021	Netflix	Titmouse, Inc	TV-MA	Flash		
Q-Force	Comedy	1 season, 10 episodes	Gabe Liedman	September 2, 2021	Netflix	Fremulon	TV-MA	Flash		
Q-Force	Comedy	1 season, 10 episodes	Gabe Liedman	September 2, 2021	Netflix	LOL... Send	TV-MA	Flash		
Teenage Euthanasia	Black comedy	2 seasons, 17 episodes	Alyson Levy	September 6, 2021 – September 28, 2023	Adult Swim	PFFR	TV-14	Flash		
Teenage Euthanasia	Black comedy	2 seasons, 17 episodes	Alyson Levy	September 6, 2021 – September 28, 2023	Adult Swim	Williams Street	TV-14	Flash		
Teenage Euthanasia	Black comedy	2 seasons, 17 episodes	Alissa Nutting	September 6, 2021 – September 28, 2023	Adult Swim	Augenblick Studios (season 1)	TV-14	Flash		
Teenage Euthanasia	Black comedy	2 seasons, 17 episodes	Alissa Nutting	September 6, 2021 – September 28, 2023	Adult Swim	Atomic Cartoons (season 2)	TV-14	Flash		
The Harper House	Animated sitcom	1 season, 10 episodes	Brad Neely	September 16 –November 4, 2021	Paramount+	CBS Studios	TV-MA	Flash		
The Harper House	Animated sitcom	1 season, 10 episodes	Brad Neely	September 16 –November 4, 2021	Paramount+	Titmouse, Inc.	TV-MA	Flash		
The Harper House	Animated sitcom	1 season, 10 episodes	Brad Neely	September 16 –November 4, 2021	Paramount+	219 Productions	TV-MA	Flash		
Chicago Party Aunt	Animated sitcom	2 seasons, 16 episodes	Chris Witaske	September 17, 2021 – December 22, 2022	Netflix	Olive Bridge Entertainment	TV-MA	Flash		
Chicago Party Aunt	Animated sitcom	2 seasons, 16 episodes	Jon Barinholtz	September 17, 2021 – December 22, 2022	Netflix	Titmouse, Inc.	TV-MA	Flash		
Star Wars: Visions	Anthology	3 seasons, 27 episodes		September 22, 2021 – present	Disney+	Lucasfilm	TV-PG	CGI/Stop-Motion/Flash/Traditional		
Ten Year Old Tom	Animated sitcom	2 season, 20 episodes	Steve Dildarian	September 30, 2021 – June 29, 2023	HBO Max	Tomorrow Studios	TV-MA	Flash		
Ten Year Old Tom	Animated sitcom	2 season, 20 episodes	Steve Dildarian	September 30, 2021 – June 29, 2023	HBO Max	Work Friends	TV-MA	Flash		
Ten Year Old Tom	Animated sitcom	2 season, 20 episodes	Steve Dildarian	September 30, 2021 – June 29, 2023	HBO Max	Insane Loon Productions	TV-MA	Flash		
Ten Year Old Tom	Animated sitcom	2 season, 20 episodes	Steve Dildarian	September 30, 2021 – June 29, 2023	HBO Max	ShadowMachine	TV-MA	Flash		
Adventure Beast	Comedy	1 season, 12 episodes	Mark Gravas	October 22, 2021	Netflix	Mission Control Media	TV-14	Flash		
Adventure Beast	Mockumentary	1 season, 12 episodes	Bradley Trevor Greive	October 22, 2021	Netflix	Kapow Pictures	TV-14	Flash		
Inside Job	Workplace comedy	1 season, 18 episodes	Shion Takeuchi	October 22, 2021 – November 18, 2022	Netflix	Netflix Animation	TV-MA	Flash		
Inside Job	Animated sitcom	1 season, 18 episodes	Shion Takeuchi	October 22, 2021 – November 18, 2022	Netflix	Taco Gucci	TV-MA	Flash		
High Guardian Spice	Magical girl Coming-of-age; Comedy	1 season, 12 episodes	Raye Rodriguez	October 26, 2021	Crunchyroll	Crunchyroll Studios	TV-14	Traditional		
Fairfax	Comedy	2 seasons, 16 episodes	Aaron Buchsbaum	October 29, 2021 – June 10, 2022	Amazon Prime Video	Amazon Studios	TV-MA	Flash		
Fairfax	Comedy	2 seasons, 16 episodes	Matt Hausfater	October 29, 2021 – June 10, 2022	Amazon Prime Video	Titmouse, Inc.	TV-MA	Flash		
Fairfax	Comedy	2 seasons, 16 episodes	Teddy Riley	October 29, 2021 – June 10, 2022	Amazon Prime Video	Serious Business	TV-MA	Flash		
Arcane	Action	2 seasons, 18 episodes	Ash Brannon	November 6, 2021 – November 23, 2024	Netflix	Riot Games	TV-14	CGI		
Arcane	Fantasy	2 seasons, 18 episodes	Ash Brannon	November 6, 2021 – November 23, 2024	Netflix	Riot Games	TV-14	CGI		
Arcane	Science fiction	2 seasons, 18 episodes	Ash Brannon	November 6, 2021 – November 23, 2024	Netflix	Riot Games	TV-14	CGI		
Arcane	Adventure	2 seasons, 18 episodes	Ash Brannon	November 6, 2021 – November 23, 2024	Netflix	Riot Games	TV-14	CGI		
The Freak Brothers	Comedy	2 seasons, 16 episodes	Gilbert Shelton (Original Characters)	November 14, 2021 – present	Tubi	Lionsgate Television	TV-MA	Flash		
The Freak Brothers	Comedy	2 seasons, 16 episodes	Gilbert Shelton (Original Characters)	November 14, 2021 – present	Tubi	Starburns Industries	TV-MA	Flash		
The Freak Brothers	Comedy	2 seasons, 16 episodes	Gilbert Shelton (Original Characters)	November 14, 2021 – present	Tubi	WTG Enterprises	TV-MA	Flash		
Blade Runner: Black Lotus	Action	1 season, 13 episodes	Philip K. Dick (Original Characters)	November 14, 2021 – February 6, 2022	Adult Swim	Alcon Entertainment	TV-14	CGI		
Blade Runner: Black Lotus	Action	1 season, 13 episodes	Kenji Kamiyama	November 14, 2021 – February 6, 2022	Adult Swim	Crunchyroll	TV-14	CGI		
Blade Runner: Black Lotus	Action	1 season, 13 episodes	Shinji Aramaki	November 14, 2021 – February 6, 2022	Adult Swim	Sola Digital Arts	TV-14	CGI		
Blade Runner: Black Lotus	Action	1 season, 13 episodes	Shinji Aramaki	November 14, 2021 – February 6, 2022	Adult Swim	Williams Street	TV-14	CGI		
Hit-Monkey	Action	2 seasons, 20 episodes	Will Speck and Josh Gordon	November 17, 2021 – July 15, 2024	Hulu	Speck Gordon Inc.	TV-MA	Traditional		
Hit-Monkey	Action	2 seasons, 20 episodes	Will Speck and Josh Gordon	November 17, 2021 – July 15, 2024	Hulu	Floyd County Productions	TV-MA	Traditional		
Hit-Monkey	Black comedy	2 seasons, 20 episodes	Will Speck and Josh Gordon	November 17, 2021 – July 15, 2024	Hulu	Floyd County Productions	TV-MA	Traditional		
Hit-Monkey	Black comedy	2 seasons, 20 episodes	Will Speck	November 17, 2021 – July 15, 2024	Hulu	Marvel Television (season 1)	TV-MA	Traditional		
Hit-Monkey	Crime drama	2 seasons, 20 episodes	Will Speck	November 17, 2021 – July 15, 2024	Hulu	20th Television Animation (season 2)	TV-MA	Traditional		
Hit-Monkey	Superhero	2 seasons, 20 episodes	Will Speck	November 17, 2021 – July 15, 2024	Hulu	20th Television Animation (season 2)	TV-MA	Traditional		
Super Crooks	Superhero	1 season, 13 episodes	Dai Satō; Tsukasa Kondō	November 25, 2021	Netflix	Millarworld; Bones	TV-MA	Traditional		
Santa Inc.	Comedy	1 season, 8 episodes	Alexandra Rushfield	December 2, 2021	HBO Max	Lionsgate Television	TV-MA	Stop-Motion		
Santa Inc.	Comedy	1 season, 8 episodes	Alexandra Rushfield	December 2, 2021	HBO Max	Point Grey Pictures	TV-MA	Stop-Motion		
Santa Inc.	Comedy	1 season, 8 episodes	Alexandra Rushfield	December 2, 2021	HBO Max	Stoopid Buddy Stoodios	TV-MA	Stop-Motion		
Santa Inc.	Comedy	1 season, 8 episodes	Alexandra Rushfield	December 2, 2021	HBO Max	Rushfield Productions	TV-MA	Stop-Motion		
Santa Inc.	Comedy	1 season, 8 episodes	Alexandra Rushfield	December 2, 2021	HBO Max	oh us.	TV-MA	Stop-Motion		
Saturday Morning All Star Hits!	Live-action animated	1 season, 8 episodes	Ben Jones	December 10, 2021	Netflix	Georgia Entertainment Industries	TV-14	Flash/Live-Action		
Saturday Morning All Star Hits!	Comedy	1 season, 8 episodes	Dave McCary	December 10, 2021	Netflix	Bento Box Entertainment	TV-14	Flash/Live-Action		
Saturday Morning All Star Hits!	Parody	1 season, 8 episodes	Kyle Mooney	December 10, 2021	Netflix	Broadway Video	TV-14	Flash/Live-Action		
Saturday Morning All Star Hits!	Sketch comedy	1 season, 8 episodes	Kyle Mooney	December 10, 2021	Netflix	Universal Television	TV-14	Flash/Live-Action		
Smiling Friends	Black comedy	3 seasons, 27 episodes	Michael Cusack	January 9, 2022 – April 12, 2026	Adult Swim	Williams Street	TV-MA	Flash (Note: Season 1)/Traditional (Note: Seasons 2–3)/CGI/Stop-Motion/Live-Action		
Smiling Friends	Surreal humor	3 seasons, 27 episodes	Zach Hadel	January 9, 2022 – April 12, 2026	Adult Swim	Princess Bento Studio	TV-MA	Flash/Traditional/CGI/Stop-Motion/Live-Action		
Smiling Friends	Absurdism	3 seasons, 27 episodes	Zach Hadel	January 9, 2022 – April 12, 2026	Adult Swim	Goblin Caught on Tape	TV-14	Flash/Traditional/CGI/Stop-Motion/Live-Action		
Supernatural Academy	Fantasy	1 season, 16 episodes	Matthew Wexler	January 20, 2022	Peacock	41 Entertainment	TV-14	CGI		
Supernatural Academy	Fantasy	1 season, 16 episodes	Matthew Wexler	January 20, 2022	Peacock	ICON Creative Studio	TV-14	CGI		
The Legend of Vox Machina	Action	3 seasons, 36 episodes	Critical Role	January 28, 2022 – present	Amazon Prime Video	Amazon Studios	TV-MA	Traditional		
The Legend of Vox Machina	Adventure	3 seasons, 36 episodes	Critical Role	January 28, 2022 – present	Amazon Prime Video	Titmouse, Inc.	TV-MA	Traditional		
The Legend of Vox Machina	Comedy drama	3 seasons, 36 episodes	Critical Role	January 28, 2022 – present	Amazon Prime Video	Titmouse, Inc.	TV-MA	Traditional		
The Legend of Vox Machina	Fantasy	3 seasons, 36 episodes	Critical Role	January 28, 2022 – present	Amazon Prime Video	Critical Role Productions	TV-MA	Traditional		
Fairview	Comedy	1 season, 8 episodes	RJ Fried	February 9 – March 30, 2022	Comedy Central	Spartina Productions	TV-MA	Flash		
Fairview	Comedy	1 season, 8 episodes	RJ Fried	February 9 – March 30, 2022	Comedy Central	Licht Media Solutions	TV-MA	Flash		
Fairview	Comedy	1 season, 8 episodes	RJ Fried	February 9 – March 30, 2022	Comedy Central	R.J. Fried Worldwide	TV-MA	Flash		
Fairview	Comedy	1 season, 8 episodes	RJ Fried	February 9 – March 30, 2022	Comedy Central	MTV Entertainment Studios	TV-MA	Flash		
Fairview	Comedy	1 season, 8 episodes	RJ Fried	February 9 – March 30, 2022	Comedy Central	CBS Studios	TV-MA	Flash		
The Guardians of Justice	Superhero	1 season, 7 episodes	Adi Shankar	March 1, 2022	Netflix	Bootleg Universe	TV-MA	Traditional/Live-Action		
The Boys Presents: Diabolical	Anthology series	1 season, 8 episodes	TBA	March 4, 2022	Amazon Prime Video	Sony Pictures Television	TV-MA	Flash/Traditional		
The Boys Presents: Diabolical	Anthology series	1 season, 8 episodes	TBA	March 4, 2022	Amazon Prime Video	Amazon Studios	TV-MA	Flash/Traditional		
The Boys Presents: Diabolical	Black comedy	1 season, 8 episodes	TBA	March 4, 2022	Amazon Prime Video	Titmouse, Inc.	TV-MA	Flash/Traditional		
The Boys Presents: Diabolical	Black comedy	1 season, 8 episodes	TBA	March 4, 2022	Amazon Prime Video	Kripke Enterprises	TV-MA	Flash/Traditional		
The Boys Presents: Diabolical	Superhero	1 season, 8 episodes	TBA	March 4, 2022	Amazon Prime Video	Original Film	TV-MA	Flash/Traditional		
The Boys Presents: Diabolical	Superhero	1 season, 8 episodes	TBA	March 4, 2022	Amazon Prime Video	Point Grey Pictures	TV-MA	Flash/Traditional		
Human Resources	Sitcom	1 season, 10 episodes	Nick Kroll	March 18, 2022 – June 9, 2023	Netflix	Brutus Pink	TV-MA	Flash		
Human Resources	Blue comedy	1 season, 10 episodes	Andrew Goldberg	March 18, 2022 – June 9, 2023	Netflix	Dance Face	TV-MA	Flash		
Human Resources	Blue comedy	1 season, 10 episodes	Kelly Galuska	March 18, 2022 – June 9, 2023	Netflix	Dance Face	TV-MA	Flash		
Human Resources	Surreal comedy	1 season, 10 episodes	Mark Levin	March 18, 2022 – June 9, 2023	Netflix	Dance Face	TV-MA	Flash		
Human Resources	Workplace comedy	1 season, 10 episodes	Jennifer Flackett	March 18, 2022 – June 9, 2023	Netflix	Titmouse, Inc.	TV-MA	Flash		
Slippin' Jimmy	Comedy	1 season, 6 episodes		May 23, 2022	AMC+	AMC Networks Content Room; Starburns Industries	TV-14	Flash		
Farzar	Comedy	1 season, 10 episodes	Waco O'Guin	July 15, 2022	Netflix	Netflix Animation	TV-MA	Flash		
Farzar	Comedy	1 season, 10 episodes	Waco O'Guin	July 15, 2022	Netflix	Damn! Show Productions	TV-MA	Flash		
Farzar	Sci-fi	1 season, 10 episodes	Roger Black	July 15, 2022	Netflix	Odenkirk Provissiero Entertainment	TV-MA	Flash		
Farzar	Sci-fi	1 season, 10 episodes	Roger Black	July 15, 2022	Netflix	Bento Box Entertainment	TV-MA	Flash		
Little Demon	Black comedy	1 season, 10 episodes	Darcy Fowler	August 25, 2022	FXX	Jersey Films 2nd Avenue	TV-MA	Flash		
Little Demon	Black comedy	1 season, 10 episodes	Darcy Fowler	August 25, 2022	FXX	Evil Hag Productions	TV-MA	Flash		
Little Demon	Sitcom	1 season, 10 episodes	Seth Kirschner	August 25, 2022	FXX	Harmonious Claptrap	TV-MA	Flash		
Little Demon	Sitcom	1 season, 10 episodes	Seth Kirschner	August 25, 2022	FXX	ShadowMachine	TV-MA	Flash		
Little Demon	Sitcom	1 season, 10 episodes	Kieran Valla	August 25, 2022	FXX	Atomic Cartoons	TV-MA	Flash		
Little Demon	Sitcom	1 season, 10 episodes	Kieran Valla	August 25, 2022	FXX	FXP	TV-MA	Flash		
Pantheon	Drama	2 seasons, 16 episodes	Craig Silverstein	September 1, 2022 – October 15, 2023	AMC+	Sesfonstein Productions	TV-14	Traditional		
Pantheon	Drama	2 seasons, 16 episodes	Craig Silverstein	September 1, 2022 – October 15, 2023	AMC+	AMC Studios	TV-14	Traditional		
Pantheon	Sci-fi	2 seasons, 16 episodes	Craig Silverstein	September 1, 2022 – October 15, 2023	AMC+	Titmouse, Inc.	TV-14	Traditional		
Dragon Age: Absolution	Fantasy	1 season, 6 episodes	Mairghread Scott	December 9, 2022	Netflix	Red Dog Culture House; BioWare	TV-MA	Traditional		
Velma	Mystery	2 seasons, 21 episodes	Charlie Grandy	January 12, 2023 – October 3, 2024	HBO Max	Charlie Grandy Productions	TV-MA	Traditional		
Velma	Horror	2 seasons, 21 episodes	Charlie Grandy	January 12, 2023 – October 3, 2024	HBO Max	Kaling International	TV-MA	Traditional		
Velma	Comedy	2 seasons, 21 episodes	Charlie Grandy	January 12, 2023 – October 3, 2024	HBO Max	3 Arts Entertainment	TV-MA	Traditional		
Velma	Thriller	2 seasons, 21 episodes	Charlie Grandy	January 12, 2023 – October 3, 2024	HBO Max	Warner Bros. Animation	TV-MA	Traditional		
Super Turbo Story Time		1 season, 8 episodes	TBA	March 14, 2023	Motortrend+	Titmouse, Inc.		Flash/Live-Action		
Super Turbo Story Time		1 season, 8 episodes	TBA	March 14, 2023	Motortrend+	MotorTrend Studio		Flash/Live-Action		
Agent Elvis	Comedy	1 season, 10 episodes	John Eddie	March 17, 2023	Netflix	Sony Pictures Animation	TV-MA	Flash		
Agent Elvis	Comedy	1 season, 10 episodes	Priscilla Presley	March 17, 2023	Netflix	Titmouse, Inc.	TV-MA	Flash		
Agent Elvis	Comedy	1 season, 10 episodes	Priscilla Presley	March 17, 2023	Netflix	Authentic Brands Group	TV-MA	Flash		
Digman!	Comedy	2 seasons, 16 episodes	Andy Samberg	March 22, 2023 – present	Comedy Central	Dandyflower Productions	TV-14	Flash		
Digman!	Comedy	2 seasons, 16 episodes	Andy Samberg	March 22, 2023 – present	Comedy Central	Lonely Island Classics	TV-14	Flash		
Digman!	Comedy	2 seasons, 16 episodes	Andy Samberg	March 22, 2023 – present	Comedy Central	Titmouse, Inc.	TV-14	Flash		
Digman!	Comedy	2 seasons, 16 episodes	Neil Campbell	March 22, 2023 – present	Comedy Central	CBS Studios	TV-14	Flash		
Digman!	Comedy	2 seasons, 16 episodes	Neil Campbell	March 22, 2023 – present	Comedy Central	MTV Entertainment Studios	TV-14	Flash		
Royal Crackers	Comedy	2 seasons, 20 episodes	Jason Ruiz	April 2, 2023 – May 2, 2024	Adult Swim	The Cheesesteak Factory	TV-MA	Flash		
Royal Crackers	Comedy	2 seasons, 20 episodes	Jason Ruiz	April 2, 2023 – May 2, 2024	Adult Swim	AntiLaugh	TV-MA	Flash		
Royal Crackers	Comedy	2 seasons, 20 episodes	Jason Ruiz	April 2, 2023 – May 2, 2024	Adult Swim	Titmouse, Inc.	TV-MA	Flash		
Royal Crackers	Comedy	2 seasons, 20 episodes	Jason Ruiz	April 2, 2023 – May 2, 2024	Adult Swim	Williams Street	TV-MA	Flash		
Fired on Mars	Sci-fi	1 season, 8 episodes	Carson Mell	April 20 – May 11, 2023	HBO Max	Pat & Mike Productions	TV-MA	Traditional		
Fired on Mars	Workplace comedy	1 season, 8 episodes	Carson Mell	April 20 – May 11, 2023	HBO Max	NN Productions	TV-MA	Traditional		
Fired on Mars	Workplace comedy	1 season, 8 episodes	Dave Sirus	April 20 – May 11, 2023	HBO Max	Rough Draft Studios	TV-MA	Traditional		
Unicorn: Warriors Eternal	Fantasy drama	1 season, 10 episodes	Genndy Tartakovsky	May 5 – June 30, 2023	Adult Swim	Cartoon Network Studios	TV-PG	Traditional		
Unicorn: Warriors Eternal	Steampunk	1 season, 10 episodes	Genndy Tartakovsky	May 5 – June 30, 2023	Adult Swim	Cartoon Network Studios	TV-PG	Traditional		
Mulligan	Comedy	1 season, 20 episodes	Robert Carlock	May 12, 2023 – May 24, 2024	Netflix	Little Stranger, Inc.	TV-14	Flash		
Mulligan	Comedy	1 season, 20 episodes	Robert Carlock	May 12, 2023 – May 24, 2024	Netflix	Bevel Gears	TV-14	Flash		
Mulligan	Comedy	1 season, 20 episodes	Robert Carlock	May 12, 2023 – May 24, 2024	Netflix	Means End Productions	TV-14	Flash		
Mulligan	Comedy	1 season, 20 episodes	Robert Carlock	May 12, 2023 – May 24, 2024	Netflix	3 Arts Entertainment	TV-14	Flash		
Mulligan	Comedy	1 season, 20 episodes	Sam Means	May 12, 2023 – May 24, 2024	Netflix	Bento Box Entertainment	TV-14	Flash		
Mulligan	Comedy	1 season, 20 episodes	Sam Means	May 12, 2023 – May 24, 2024	Netflix	Universal Television	TV-14	Flash		
Skull Island	Adventure	1 season, 8 episodes	Brian Duffield	June 22, 2023	Netflix	Powerhouse Animation; Legendary Television	TV-14	Traditional		
My Adventures with Superman	Superhero	2 seasons, 20 episodes	Jake Wyatt	July 7, 2023 – present	Adult Swim	Warner Bros. Animation	TV-PG	Traditional		
My Adventures with Superman	Action-adventure	2 seasons, 20 episodes	Jake Wyatt	July 7, 2023 – present	Adult Swim	DC Entertainment	TV-PG	Traditional		
Praise Petey	Comedy	1 season, 10 episodes	Anna Drezen	July 21, 2023	Freeform	20th Television Animation		Flash		
Praise Petey	Comedy	1 season, 10 episodes	Greg Daniels	July 21, 2023	Freeform	ShadowMachine		Flash		
Praise Petey	Comedy	1 season, 10 episodes	Mike Judge	July 21, 2023	Freeform	Bandera Entertainment		Flash		
Captain Fall	Comedy	1 season, 20 episodes	Joel Trussell	July 28, 2023	Netflix	Netflix Animation		Flash		
Captain Fall	Comedy	1 season, 20 episodes	Writers & Models	July 28, 2023	Netflix			Flash		
Strange Planet	Comedy	1 season, 10 episodes	Dan Harmon	August 9, 2023	Apple TV+	Apple Studios		Flash		
Strange Planet	Comedy	1 season, 10 episodes	Dan Harmon	August 9, 2023	Apple TV+	ShadowMachine		Flash		
Strange Planet	Comedy	1 season, 10 episodes	Nathan Pyle	August 9, 2023	Apple TV+	Harmonious Claptrap		Flash		
Strange Planet	Comedy	1 season, 10 episodes	Clint Eland	August 9, 2023	Apple TV+	Mercury Filmworks		Flash		
Adventure Time: Fionna and Cake	Science fantasy	2 seasons, 20 episodes	Adam Muto	August 31, 2023 – present	Max	Cartoon Network Studios		Traditional		
Adventure Time: Fionna and Cake	Adventure	2 seasons, 20 episodes	Adam Muto	August 31, 2023 – present	Max	Cartoon Network Studios		Traditional		
Adventure Time: Fionna and Cake	Comedy	2 seasons, 20 episodes	Adam Muto	August 31, 2023 – present	Max	Frederator Studios		Traditional		
Young Love	Animated sitcom	1 season, 12 episodes	Matthew A. Cherry	September 21 – October 19, 2023	Max	Sony Pictures Animation		Flash		
Young Love	Animated sitcom	1 season, 12 episodes	Matthew A. Cherry	September 21 – October 19, 2023	Max	Blue Key Entertainment		Flash		
Young Love	Animated sitcom	1 season, 12 episodes	Carl Jones	September 21 – October 19, 2023	Max	Lion Forge Animation		Flash		
Krapopolis	Sitcom	3 seasons, 56 episodes	Dan Harmon	September 24, 2023 – present	Fox	Fox Entertainment Studios		Flash		
Krapopolis	Sitcom	3 seasons, 56 episodes	Dan Harmon	September 24, 2023 – present	Fox	Bento Box Entertainment		Flash		
Krapopolis	Sitcom	3 seasons, 56 episodes	Dan Harmon	September 24, 2023 – present	Fox	Harmonious Claptrap		Flash		
Castlevania: Nocturne	Action	2 seasons, 16 episodes	Clive Bradley	September 28, 2023 – present	Netflix	Project 51 Productions		Traditional		
Castlevania: Nocturne	Adventure	2 seasons, 16 episodes	Clive Bradley	September 28, 2023 – present	Netflix	Powerhouse Animation		Traditional		
Castlevania: Nocturne	Dark fantasy	2 seasons, 16 episodes	Clive Bradley	September 28, 2023 – present	Netflix	Powerhouse Animation		Traditional		
Castlevania: Nocturne	Drama	2 seasons, 16 episodes	Clive Bradley	September 28, 2023 – present	Netflix	Frederator Studios		Traditional		
Castlevania: Nocturne	Horror	2 seasons, 16 episodes	Clive Bradley	September 28, 2023 – present	Netflix	Frederator Studios		Traditional		
Captain Laserhawk: A Blood Dragon Remix	Science fiction	1 season, 6 episodes	Adi Shankar	October 19, 2023	Netflix	Ubisoft Film & Television; Bobbypills; Bootleg Universe	TV-MA	Traditional		
Scavengers Reign	Sci-fi	1 season, 12 episodes	Joe Bennett	October 19 – November 9, 2023	Max	Titmouse, Inc.	TV-MA	Traditional		
Scavengers Reign	Drama	1 season, 12 episodes	Charles Huettner	October 19 – November 9, 2023	Max	Green Street Pictures	TV-MA	Traditional		
Blue Eye Samurai	Action	1 season, 8 episodes	Michael Green	November 3, 2023	Netflix	Netflix Animation	TV-MA	Traditional		
Blue Eye Samurai	Action	1 season, 8 episodes	Amber Noizumi	November 3, 2023	Netflix	3 Arts Entertainment	TV-MA	Traditional		
Scott Pilgrim Takes Off	Comedy	1 season, 8 episodes	Bryan Lee O'Malley	November 17, 2023	Netflix	Universal Content Productions	TV-MA	Traditional		
Scott Pilgrim Takes Off	Action	1 season, 8 episodes	Bryan Lee O'Malley	November 17, 2023	Netflix	Marc Platt Productions	TV-MA	Traditional		
Scott Pilgrim Takes Off	Fantasy	1 season, 8 episodes	BenDavid Grabinski	November 17, 2023	Netflix	Science Saru	TV-MA	Traditional		
Carol & the End of the World	Comedy drama	1 season, 10 episodes	Dan Guterman	December 15, 2023	Netflix	Netflix Animation	TV-MA	Flash		
Carol & the End of the World	Comedy drama	1 season, 10 episodes	Dan Guterman	December 15, 2023	Netflix	Bardel Entertainment	TV-MA	Flash		
Grimsburg	Sitcom	2 seasons, 26 episodes	Catlan McClelland	January 7, 2024 – present	Fox	Gizmotech Industries		Flash		
Grimsburg	Sitcom	2 seasons, 26 episodes	Catlan McClelland	January 7, 2024 – present	Fox	The Jackal Group		Flash		
Grimsburg	Sitcom	2 seasons, 26 episodes	Matthew Schlissel	January 7, 2024 – present	Fox	Fox Entertainment Studios		Flash		
Grimsburg	Sitcom	2 seasons, 26 episodes	Matthew Schlissel	January 7, 2024 – present	Fox	Bento Box Entertainment		Flash		
Hazbin Hotel	Musical	2 seasons, 16 episodes	Vivienne Medrano	January 19, 2024 – present	Amazon Prime Video	SpindleHorse Toons	TV-MA	Traditional		
Hazbin Hotel	Black comedy	2 seasons, 16 episodes	Vivienne Medrano	January 19, 2024 – present	Amazon Prime Video	A24 Television	TV-MA	Traditional		
Hazbin Hotel	Comedy drama	2 seasons, 16 episodes	Vivienne Medrano	January 19, 2024 – present	Amazon Prime Video	Bento Box Entertainment	TV-MA	Traditional		
Hazbin Hotel	Fantasy	2 seasons, 16 episodes	Vivienne Medrano	January 19, 2024 – present	Amazon Prime Video	Amazon MGM Studios	TV-MA	Traditional		
In the Know	Comedy	1 season, 6 episodes	Mike Judge	January 25, 2024	Peacock	ShadowMachine		Stop-Motion		
In the Know	Comedy	1 season, 6 episodes	Mike Judge	January 25, 2024	Peacock	Bandera Entertainment		Stop-Motion		
In the Know	Comedy	1 season, 6 episodes	Zach Woods	January 25, 2024	Peacock	Universal Television		Stop-Motion		
The Second Best Hospital in the Galaxy	Dark comedy	2 seasons, 16 episodes	Cirocco Dunlap	February 23, 2024 – present	Amazon Prime Video	Animal Pictures		Flash		
The Second Best Hospital in the Galaxy	Dark comedy	2 seasons, 16 episodes	Cirocco Dunlap	February 23, 2024 – present	Amazon Prime Video	Rat Ghost		Flash		
The Second Best Hospital in the Galaxy	Sci-fi	2 seasons, 16 episodes	Cirocco Dunlap	February 23, 2024 – present	Amazon Prime Video	Titmouse, Inc.		Flash		
The Second Best Hospital in the Galaxy	Sci-fi	2 seasons, 16 episodes	Cirocco Dunlap	February 23, 2024 – present	Amazon Prime Video	Amazon MGM Studios		Flash		
Ark: The Animated Series	Action-adventure	1 season, 6 episodes	Jeremy Stieglitz	March 21, 2024 – present	Paramount+	Lex + Otis	TV-14	Traditional		
Ark: The Animated Series	Drama	1 season, 6 episodes	Jeremy Stieglitz	March 21, 2024 – present	Paramount+	Studio Wildcard	TV-14	Traditional		
Ark: The Animated Series	Science fantasy	1 season, 6 episodes	Jesse Rapczak	March 21, 2024 – present	Paramount+	Tiger Animation	TV-14	Traditional		
Good Times: Black Again	Sitcom	1 season, 8 episodes	Carl Jones	April 12, 2024	Netflix	Act III Productions		Flash		
Good Times: Black Again	Sitcom	1 season, 8 episodes	Carl Jones	April 12, 2024	Netflix	Studio Moshi		Flash		
Good Times: Black Again	Sitcom	1 season, 8 episodes	Carl Jones	April 12, 2024	Netflix	Unanimous Media		Flash		
Good Times: Black Again	Sitcom	1 season, 8 episodes	Ranada Shepard	April 12, 2024	Netflix	Fuzzy Door Productions		Flash		
Good Times: Black Again	Sitcom	1 season, 8 episodes	Ranada Shepard	April 12, 2024	Netflix	CoCo Cubana Productions		Flash		
Good Times: Black Again	Sitcom	1 season, 8 episodes	Ranada Shepard	April 12, 2024	Netflix	Sony Pictures Television		Flash		
Mr. Birchum	Comedy	1 season, 6 episodes	Adam Carolla	May 12 – June 9, 2024	DailyWire+	Chassy Media; Wise Blue Studios	TV-MA	Flash		
Ren & Stimpy (2024)	Comedy	1 season, 10 episodes	Bob Camp	July 1, 2024	Comedy Central	Awesome Inc	TV-14	Traditional		
Ren & Stimpy (2024)	Slapstick	1 season, 10 episodes	John Kricfalusi (original characters, uncredited)	July 1, 2024	Comedy Central	Awesome Inc	TV-14	Traditional		
Sausage Party: Foodtopia	Comedy	2 seasons, 16 episodes	Seth Rogen	July 11, 2024 – present	Amazon Prime Video	Amazon MGM Studios	TV-MA	CGI		
Sausage Party: Foodtopia	Comedy	2 seasons, 16 episodes	Seth Rogen	July 11, 2024 – present	Amazon Prime Video	Point Grey Pictures	TV-MA	CGI		
Sausage Party: Foodtopia	Comedy	2 seasons, 16 episodes	Evan Goldberg	July 11, 2024 – present	Amazon Prime Video	Annapurna Television	TV-MA	CGI		
Sausage Party: Foodtopia	Comedy	2 seasons, 16 episodes	Conrad Vernon	July 11, 2024 – present	Amazon Prime Video	Sony Pictures Television	TV-MA	CGI		
Exploding Kittens	Sitcom	1 season, 9 episodes	Matthew Inman	July 12, 2024	Netflix	Netflix Animation	TV-14	Flash		
Exploding Kittens	Sitcom	1 season, 9 episodes	Matthew Inman	July 12, 2024	Netflix	Bandera Entertainment		Flash		
Exploding Kittens	Sitcom	1 season, 9 episodes	Matthew Inman	July 12, 2024	Netflix	Chomp City Productions		Flash		
Exploding Kittens	Sitcom	1 season, 9 episodes	Matthew Inman	July 12, 2024	Netflix	Chernin Entertainment		Flash		
Kite Man: Hell Yeah!	Superhero	1 season, 10 episodes	Justin Halpern	July 18, 2024	Max	Delicious Non-Sequitur		Traditional		
Kite Man: Hell Yeah!	Superhero	1 season, 10 episodes	Justin Halpern	July 18, 2024	Max	Yes, Norman Productions		Traditional		
Kite Man: Hell Yeah!	Comedy	1 season, 10 episodes	Lorey Stories	July 18, 2024	Max	Warner Bros. Animation		Traditional		
Kite Man: Hell Yeah!	Comedy	1 season, 10 episodes	Lorey Stories	July 18, 2024	Max	DC Entertainment		Traditional		
Batman: Caped Crusader	Action	1 season, 10 episodes	Bruce Timm	August 1, 2024	Amazon Prime Video	6th & Idaho		Traditional		
Batman: Caped Crusader	Action	1 season, 10 episodes	Bruce Timm	August 1, 2024	Amazon Prime Video	Bad Robot Productions		Traditional		
Batman: Caped Crusader	Superhero	1 season, 10 episodes	Matt Reeves	August 1, 2024	Amazon Prime Video	Warner Bros. Animation		Traditional		
Batman: Caped Crusader	Superhero	1 season, 10 episodes	Matt Reeves	August 1, 2024	Amazon Prime Video	DC Studios		Traditional		
Rick and Morty: The Anime	Science fiction	1 season, 10 episodes	Takashi Sano	August 16 – October 18, 2024	Adult Swim	Sola Entertainment; Telecom Animation Film; Studio Deen; Williams Street	TV-14	Traditional		
Universal Basic Guys	Comedy	2 seasons, 25 episodes	Adam and Craig Malamut	September 8, 2024 – present	Fox	Mutsack Productions		Flash		
Universal Basic Guys	Comedy	2 seasons, 25 episodes	Adam and Craig Malamut	September 8, 2024 – present	Fox	One Man Canoe		Flash		
Universal Basic Guys	Comedy	2 seasons, 25 episodes	Adam and Craig Malamut	September 8, 2024 – present	Fox	Fox Entertainment		Flash		
Universal Basic Guys	Comedy	2 seasons, 25 episodes	Adam and Craig Malamut	September 8, 2024 – present	Fox	Bento Box Entertainment		Flash		
Universal Basic Guys	Comedy	2 seasons, 25 episodes	Adam and Craig Malamut	September 8, 2024 – present	Fox	Sony Pictures Television		Flash		
Twilight of the Gods		1 season, 10 episodes	Zack Snyder; Jay Oliva; Eric Carrasco	September 19, 2024	Netflix	Stone Quarry Animation; Xilam Animation	TV-MA	Traditional		
Everybody Still Hates Chris	Comedy	1 season, 10 episodes	TBA	September 25, 2024 – present	Paramount+	CBS Eye Animation Productions		Flash		
Everybody Still Hates Chris	Comedy	1 season, 10 episodes	TBA	September 25, 2024 – present	Paramount+	Chris Rock Enterprises		Flash		
Everybody Still Hates Chris	Comedy	1 season, 10 episodes	TBA	September 25, 2024 – present	Comedy Central	3 Arts Entertainment		Flash		
Tomb Raider: The Legend of Lara Croft	Action-adventure	2 seasons, 16 episodes	Tasha Huo	October 10, 2024 – December 11, 2025	Netflix	Crystal Dynamics; DJ2 Entertainment; Powerhouse Animation Studios; Panda Burrow; Legendary Television	TV-14	Traditional		
Creature Commandos	Action	1 season, 7 episodes	James Gunn	December 5, 2024	Max	Warner Bros. Animation		Traditional		
Creature Commandos	Superhero	1 season, 7 episodes	James Gunn	December 5, 2024	Max	DC Studios		Traditional		
Secret Level	Anthology	1 season, 15 episodes	Tim Miller	December 10, 2024	Amazon Prime Video	Blur Studio		CGI		
Secret Level	Anthology	1 season, 15 episodes	Tim Miller	December 10, 2024	Amazon Prime Video	Amazon MGM Studios		CGI		
Common Side Effects	Sci-fi	1 season, 10 episodes	Joe Bennett	February 2, 2025 – present	Adult Swim	Bandera Entertainment	TV-MA	Flash		
Common Side Effects	Thriller	1 season, 10 episodes	Joe Bennett	February 2, 2025 – present	Adult Swim	Green Street Pictures	TV-MA	Flash		
Common Side Effects	mycology	1 season, 10 episodes	Steve Healy	February 2, 2025 – present	Adult Swim	Tell Me More	TV-MA	Flash		
Common Side Effects	mycology	1 season, 10 episodes	Steve Healy	February 2, 2025 – present	Adult Swim	Williams Street	TV-MA	Flash		
Lil Kev	Comedy	1 season 10 episodes	TBA	March 6, 2025	BET+	HartBeat Productions		Flash		
Lil Kev	Comedy	1 season 10 episodes	TBA	March 6, 2025	BET+	ShadowMachine		Flash		
Oh My God, Yes! A Series of Extremely Relatable Circumstances	Comedy	1 season, 7 episodes	Adele Williams	March 10, 2025 – present	Adult Swim	Williams Street	TV-MA	Flash		
Devil May Cry	Fantasy	1 season, 8 episodes	Adi Shankar	April 3, 2025 – present	Netflix	Studio Mir; Adi Shankar Animation; Capcom	TV-MA	Traditional		
#1 Happy Family USA	Comedy	1 season, 8 episodes	Ramy Youssef	April 17, 2025	Amazon Prime Video	Cairo Cowboy		Flash		
#1 Happy Family USA	Comedy	1 season, 8 episodes	Ramy Youssef	April 17, 2025	Amazon Prime Video	A24 Television		Flash		
#1 Happy Family USA	Comedy	1 season, 8 episodes	Ramy Youssef	April 17, 2025	Amazon Prime Video	Amazon MGM Studios		Flash		
Eyes of Wakanda	Anthology	1 season, 4 episodes	Todd Harris	August 1, 2025	Disney+	Marvel Studios Animation; Proximity Media	TV-14	CGI		
Long Story Short	Comedy Drama	1 season 10 episodes	Raphael Bob-Waksberg	August 22, 2025	Netflix	Netflix Animation	TV-14	Flash		
Long Story Short	Comedy Drama	1 season 10 episodes	Raphael Bob-Waksberg	August 22, 2025	Netflix	The Tornante Company	TV-14	Flash		
Long Story Short	Comedy Drama	1 season 10 episodes	Raphael Bob-Waksberg	August 22, 2025	Netflix	ShadowMachine	TV-14	Flash		
Haunted Hotel	Comedy	1 season, 10 episodes	Matt Roller	September 19, 2025	Netflix	Harmonious Claptrap	TV-14	Flash		
Haunted Hotel	Comedy	1 season, 10 episodes	Matt Roller	September 19, 2025	Netflix	Magic Giraffe	TV-14	Flash		
Haunted Hotel	Horror	1 season, 10 episodes	Matt Roller	September 19, 2025	Netflix	Titmouse, Inc.	TV-14	Flash		
Haunted Hotel	Horror	1 season, 10 episodes	Matt Roller	September 19, 2025	Netflix	Netflix Animation	TV-14	Flash		
Marvel Zombies	Superhero	1 season 4 episodes	TBA	September 24, 2025	Disney+	Marvel Studios	TV-MA	CGI		
Marvel Zombies	Horror	1 season 4 episodes	TBA	September 24, 2025	Disney+	Marvel Studios	TV-MA	CGI		
Splinter Cell: Deathwatch	Spy fiction	1 season, 8 episodes	Derek Kolstad	October 14, 2025 – present	Netflix	Tradecraft; Sun Creature Studio; FOST Studio; Ubisoft Film & Television	TV-MA	Traditional		
Haha, You Clowns	Comedy	1 season, 10 episodes	Joe Cappa	October 19, 2025 – present	Adult Swim	Williams Street	TV-MA	Flash		
The Mighty Nein	Fantasy	1 season, 8 episodes	Critical Role	November 19, 2025	Amazon Prime Video	Amazon MGM Studios		Traditional		
The Mighty Nein	Fantasy	1 season, 8 episodes	Critical Role	November 19, 2025	Amazon Prime Video	Titmouse, Inc.		Traditional		
The Mighty Nein	Fantasy	1 season, 8 episodes	Critical Role	November 19, 2025	Amazon Prime Video	Metapigeon		Traditional		
Strip Law	Comedy	1 season, 10 episodes	Cullen Crawford	February 20, 2026	Netflix	Underground	TV-MA	Flash		
Strip Law	Comedy	1 season, 10 episodes	Cullen Crawford	February 20, 2026	Netflix	Titmouse, Inc.	TV-MA	Flash		
Kevin	Comedy	1 season, 8 episodes	Aubrey Plaza	April 20, 2026	Amazon Prime Video	Titmouse, Inc.		Flash		
Kevin	Comedy	1 season, 8 episodes	Joe Wengert	April 20, 2026	Amazon Prime Video	Evil Hag Productions	Amazon MGM Studios	Flash		
Kevin	Comedy	1 season, 8 episodes	Joe Wengert	April 20, 2026	Amazon Prime Video	Evil Hag Productions	Amazon MGM Studios	Flash		TV-MA
Mating Season	Comedy	1 season, 10 episodes	TBA	May 22, 2026	Netflix	Titmouse, Inc.		Flash		
Among Us	Science Fiction	1 season, 10 episodes	Owen Dennis	June 5, 2026	Paramount+	CBS Eye Animation Productions		Flash/Traditional		
Among Us	Comedy	1 season, 10 episodes	Owen Dennis	June 5, 2026	Paramount+	Innersloth		Flash/Traditional		
Among Us	Murder Mystery	1 season, 10 episodes	Owen Dennis	June 5, 2026	Paramount+	Titmouse, Inc.		Flash/Traditional		
Breaking Bear	Comedy	1 season, 8 episodes	Julien Nitzberg	July 24, 2026	Tubi	Cartel Entertainment		Flash		
Breaking Bear	Comedy	1 season, 8 episodes	Julien Nitzberg	July 24, 2026	Tubi	To The Stars Media		Flash		
President Curtis	Comedy	1 season, 10 episodes	Dan Harmon	July 26, 2026 – present	Adult Swim	Harmonious Claptrap		Flash		
President Curtis	Comedy	1 season, 10 episodes	James Siciliano	July 26, 2026 – present	Adult Swim	Williams Street		Flash		
Alley Cats	Comedy	1 season, 6 episodes	Ricky Gervais	August 7, 2026	Netflix	Derek Production		Flash		
Alley Cats	Comedy	1 season, 6 episodes	Ricky Gervais	August 7, 2026	Netflix	Shush Creative		Flash		
Alley Cats	Comedy	1 season, 6 episodes	Ricky Gervais	August 7, 2026	Netflix	Blink Industries		Flash		
Dang!	Comedy	1 season, 8 episodes	TBA	September 8, 2026	Netflix	Titmouse, Inc.	TV-MA	Flash		
Dang!	Comedy	1 season, 8 episodes	TBA	September 8, 2026	Netflix	Universal Television	TV-MA	Flash		
Golden Axe		1 season, 10 episodes	TBA	September 16, 2026	Paramount+	Original Film		Traditional/Flash		
Golden Axe		1 season, 10 episodes	TBA	September 16, 2026	Paramount+	Titmouse, Inc.		Traditional/Flash		
Golden Axe		1 season, 10 episodes	TBA	September 16, 2026	Paramount+	Sony Pictures Television		Traditional/Flash		
Golden Axe		1 season, 10 episodes	TBA	September 16, 2026	Paramount+	CBS Eye Animation Productions		Traditional/Flash		
Bass X Machina	Action	1 season, 6 episodes	LeSean Thomas	November 3, 2026	Netflix	Studio Mir		Flash		

=== Australia ===
Title	Genre	Seasons/episodes	Show creator(s)	Original release	Network	Studio	Age rating	Technique	Source
Regular Old Bogan	Animated sitcom	1 season, 6 episodes	Mark Nicholson; Sebastian Peart	October 26, 2020	7mate	Stepmates Studios; Seven Studios	TV-MA	Flash	
Koala Man	Superhero	1 season, 8 episodes	Michael Cusack	January 9, 2023	Hulu	Cusack Creatures	TV-MA	Flash	
Koala Man	Superhero	1 season, 8 episodes	Michael Cusack	January 9, 2023	Hulu	Hermit House	TV-MA	Flash	
Koala Man	Superhero	1 season, 8 episodes	Michael Cusack	January 9, 2023	Hulu	Justin Roiland's Solo Vanity Card Productions!	TV-MA	Flash	
Koala Man	Superhero	1 season, 8 episodes	Michael Cusack	January 9, 2023	Hulu	Princess Bento Studio	TV-MA	Flash	
Koala Man	Comedy	1 season, 8 episodes	Michael Cusack	January 9, 2023	Hulu	20th Television Animation	TV-MA	Flash	

=== Canada ===
Title	Genre	Seasons/episodes	Show creator(s)	Original release	Network	Studio	Technique	Source
Doomsday Brothers	Sitcom	1 season, 18 episodes	Alain Dagenais	September 17, 2020 – March 4, 2021	Adult Swim	Portfolio Entertainment	Flash	
Doomsday Brothers	Sitcom	1 season, 18 episodes	Liliana Reyes	September 17, 2020 – March 4, 2021	Adult Swim	N12 Productions	Flash	
Doomsday Brothers	Sitcom	1 season, 18 episodes	Willem Wennekers	September 17, 2020 – March 4, 2021	Télétoon la nuit	N12 Productions	Flash	
Doomlands	Sitcom	2 seasons, 15 episodes	Josh O'Keefe	January 28, 2022 – September 3, 2024	Roku	Look Mom! Productions	TV-MA	Flash
Doomlands	Science fiction	2 seasons, 15 episodes	Josh O'Keefe	January 28, 2022 – September 3, 2024	Roku	Look Mom! Productions	TV-MA	Flash
Doomlands	Black comedy	2 seasons, 15 episodes	Josh O'Keefe	January 28, 2022 – September 3, 2024	Roku	Look Mom! Productions	TV-MA	Flash
Doomlands	Adventure	2 seasons, 15 episodes	Josh O'Keefe	January 28, 2022 – September 3, 2024	Roku	Look Mom! Productions	TV-MA	Flash
Red Ketchup		1 season, 20 episodes		April 20 – December 7, 2023	Adult Swim; Télétoon la nuit		Flash	
Psi Cops	Dark comedy Supernatural	1 season, 24 episodes	Bart Batchelor; Chris Nielsen	June 5 – August 28, 2023	Adult Swim; Télétoon la nuit	Corus Entertainment; Oddfellows Labs; Skybound Galactic; Wind Sun Sky Entertainment	Flash	
Super Team Canada	Comedy	1 season, 10 episodes	Robert Cohen	May 16, 2025	Crave	Atomic Cartoons		Flash
Super Team Canada	Comedy	1 season, 10 episodes	Joel H. Cohen	May 16, 2025	Crave	Electric Avenue		Flash

=== France ===
Title	Genre	Seasons/episodes	Show creator(s)	Original release	Network	Studio	Technique	Source
The Epic Time Leap	Action	1 season, 10 episodes	Cyprien Iov	April 9, 2021	Adult Swim	Périple Production	Flash	

=== Italy ===
Title	Genre	Seasons/episodes	Show creator(s)	Original release	Network	Studio	Technique	Source
Tear Along the Dotted Line	Comedy drama	1 season, 6 episodes	Zerocalcare	November 17, 2021	Netflix	Movements Production	TV-MA	Flash
Tear Along the Dotted Line	Comedy drama	1 season, 6 episodes	Zerocalcare	November 17, 2021	Netflix	Bao Publishing	TV-MA	Flash
Tear Along the Dotted Line	Comedy drama	1 season, 6 episodes	Zerocalcare	November 17, 2021	Netflix	DogHead Animation Studio	TV-MA	Flash
This World Can't Tear Me Down	Comedy	1 season, 6 episodes	Zerocalcare	June 9, 2023	Netflix	Movements Production	TV-MA	Flash
This World Can't Tear Me Down	Comedy	1 season, 6 episodes	Zerocalcare	June 9, 2023	Netflix	Bao Publishing	TV-MA	Flash
This World Can't Tear Me Down	Comedy	1 season, 6 episodes	Zerocalcare	June 9, 2023	Netflix	DogHead Animation Studio	TV-MA	Flash
Il Baracchino	Comedy drama	1 season, 6 episodes	Nicolò Cuccì; Salvo Di Paola	June 3, 2025 – present	Amazon Prime Video	Lucky Red; Megadrago	Mixed	
My Two Cents	Comedy	TBA	Zerocalcare	May 27, 2026	Netflix	Movements Production	TV-MA	Flash
My Two Cents	Comedy	TBA	Zerocalcare	May 27, 2026	Netflix	Bao Publishing	TV-MA	Flash
My Two Cents	Comedy	TBA	Zerocalcare	May 27, 2026	Netflix	DogHead Animation Studio	TV-MA	Flash

=== India ===
Title	Genre	Seasons/episodes	Show creator(s)	Original release	Network	Studio	Source
Baahubali: Crown of Blood	Action	1 season, 9 episodes	Sharad Devarajan; S. S. Rajamouli	May 17 – July 4, 2024	Disney+ Hotstar	Graphic India	

=== Spain ===
Title	Genre	Seasons, episodes	Show creator	Release date	Original channel	Studio	Age rating	Technique	Source
Poor Devil	Comedy	1 season, 8 episodes	TBA	February 17, 2023	HBO Max	Buendia Estudios	TV-MA	Flash	
Poor Devil	Comedy	1 season, 8 episodes	TBA	February 17, 2023	HBO Max	Rockyn Animation	TV-MA	Flash	

=== Latin America ===
Title	Country	Genre	Seasons, episodes	Show creator	Release date	Original channel	Studio	Age rating	Technique	Source
Los Lopeggs	Mexico	Comedy	1 season, 6 episodes	Rodolfo Riva Palacio Alatriste; Gabriel Riva Palacio Alatriste	June 17, 2021	Amazon Prime Video	Huevocartoon Producciones		Flash	
Women Wearing Shoulder Pads	Mexico	Comedy	1 season, 8 episodes	Gonzalo Cordova	August 17, 2025 – present	Adult Swim	Cinema Fantasma	TV-MA	Stop-Motion	
Women Wearing Shoulder Pads	Mexico	Comedy	1 season, 8 episodes	Gonzalo Cordova	August 17, 2025 – present	Adult Swim	Williams Street	TV-MA	Stop-Motion	

=== Malaysia ===
Title	Country	Genre	Seasons, episodes	Show creator	Release date	Original channel	Studio	Age rating	Technique	Source
Kisah Bawah Tanah	Malaysia	Comedy horror	1 season, 26 episodes	Hendra Wardi; Arzuan 'Alet' Anuar	March 9, 2026 – present	Astro Prima	Animasia Studio	TV-14	Flash	

== Upcoming ==
Title	Genre	Seasons/episodes	Show creator(s)	Original release	Network	Studio	Age rating	Technique	Source
Ted: The Animated Series	Comedy	TBA	TBA	December 17, 2026	Peacock	MRC		Traditional	
Ted: The Animated Series	Comedy	TBA	TBA	December 17, 2026	Peacock	Fuzzy Door Productions		Traditional	
Ted: The Animated Series	Comedy	TBA	TBA	December 17, 2026	Peacock	Universal Content Productions		Traditional	
Living the Dream	Comedy	1 season, 8 episodes	George Gendi	December 18, 2026	Netflix	Hanna-Barbera Studios Europe		Flash	
Planeswalker	Fantasy	TBA	Jeff Kline	2027	Netflix	Netflix Animation			
Planeswalker	Fantasy	TBA	Jeff Kline	2027	Netflix	Octopie Network			
Planeswalker	Fantasy	TBA	Jeff Kline	2027	Netflix	Bardel Entertainment			
Planeswalker	Fantasy	TBA	Jeff Kline	2027	Netflix	Entertainment One			
Stewie	Comedy	2 seasons	Seth MacFarlane	2027	Fox	Fuzzy Door Prouductions		Flash	
Stewie	Comedy	2 seasons	Seth MacFarlane	2027	Hulu	20th Television Animation		Flash	
SuperMutant Magic Academy		TBA	J. G. Quintel	2027	Adult Swim	Cartoon Network Studios		Traditional	
SuperMutant Magic Academy		TBA	Jillian Tamaki	2027	Adult Swim	Cartoon Network Studios		Traditional	
2051	Comedy	TBA	Mo Mandel	TBA	Amazon Prime Video	3 Arts Entertainment			
2051	Comedy	TBA	Jason Fuchs	TBA	Amazon Prime Video	Amazon MGM Studios			
Absolute Batman	Action	TBA	TBA	TBA	TBA	DC Studios		CGI	
Absolute Batman	Action	TBA	TBA	TBA	TBA	Warner Bros. Animation		CGI	
Adventure Time: Bubblegum & Marceline	Comedy	1 season, 10 episodes	TBA	TBA	HBO Max	FredFilms		Traditional	
Adventure Time: Bubblegum & Marceline	Comedy	1 season, 10 episodes	TBA	TBA	HBO Max	Cartoon Network Studios		Traditional	
Anchivo Motors	Comedy	TBA	Brett Cawley	TBA	Netflix	Underground			
Anchivo Motors	Comedy	TBA	Robert Maitia	TBA	Netflix	Underground			
Amberville	Crime comedy	TBA	Chris McCoy	TBA	Amazon Prime Video	Amazon MGM Studios		CGI	
Amberville	Crime comedy	TBA	Conrad Vernon	TBA	Amazon Prime Video	Annapurna Television		CGI	
Anything Factory	Comedy	TBA	Tom Kauffman	TBA	HBO Max	Searchlight Television			
Anything Factory	Comedy	TBA	David Seger	TBA	HBO Max	Searchlight Television			
Anything Factory	Comedy	TBA	Spencer Strauss	TBA	HBO Max	Searchlight Television			
Bad Friends	Comedy	TBA	Andrew Santino	TBA	Hulu	Underground			
Bad Friends	Comedy	TBA	Andrew Santino	TBA	Hulu	Five All In The Fifth			
Bad Friends	Comedy	TBA	Bobby Lee	TBA	Hulu	20th Television Animation			
Bananaman		TBA	TBA	TBA	Fox	Fox Entertainment			
Bananaman		TBA	TBA	TBA	Fox	Bento Box Entertainment			
Best Buds		TBA	Caitie Delaney	TBA	Peacock	Bandera Entertainment			
Best Buds		TBA	Caleb Hearon	TBA	Peacock	Universal Television			
The Blues Brothers		TBA	TBA	TBA	TBA	Bento Box Entertainment			
Buffalo Wings	Sitcom	TBA	Hugh Davidson	TBA	Fox	Fox Entertainment			
Buffalo Wings	Sitcom	TBA	Rachel Ramras	TBA	Fox	20th Television Animation			
Buffalo Wings	Sitcom	TBA	Larry Dorf	TBA	Fox	20th Television Animation			
Clue		TBA	TBA	TBA	Fox	Fox Entertainment			
Clue		TBA	TBA	TBA	Fox	Bento Box Entertainment			
Clue		TBA	TBA	TBA	Fox	Entertainment One			
Cocky		TBA	TBA	TBA	Fox	Fox Entertainment			
Cocky		TBA	TBA	TBA	Fox	Bento Box Entertainment			
Conan the Barbarian		TBA	Genndy Tartakovsky	TBA	Amazon Prime Video	Cartoon Network Studios		Traditional	
Crag Banyon P.I.		TBA	Shane Black	TBA	Fox	Fox Entertainment			
Crag Banyon P.I.		TBA	Shane Black	TBA	Fox	Bento Box Entertainment			
Dad’s House	Comedy	TBA	Michael Cusack	TBA	Netflix	Princess Pictures			
Dad’s House	Comedy	TBA	Dario Russo	TBA	Netflix	Princess Pictures			
Dad’s House	Comedy	TBA	David Ashby	TBA	Netflix	Bento Box Entertainment			
Daddy Issues		TBA	TBA	TBA	Fox	Fox Entertainment			
Daddy Issues		TBA	TBA	TBA	Fox	Bento Box Entertainment			
Dark Shadows	Soap opera	TBA	TBA	TBA	TBA	Warner Bros. Animation			
Dark Shadows	Horror	TBA	TBA	TBA	TBA	Warner Bros. Animation			
Dating the Lopez Ladies	Comedy	TBA	Calderón Kellett	TBA	Amazon Prime Video	Amazon MGM Studios			
Dating the Lopez Ladies	Comedy	TBA	Calderón Kellett	TBA	Amazon Prime Video	GloNation Studios			
Dead Henry		TBA	James Corden	TBA	Fox	Fox Entertainment			
Dead Henry		TBA	James Corden	TBA	Fox	CBS Studios			
Dead Henry		TBA	James Corden	TBA	Fox	Fulwell 73			
Dead Henry		TBA	James Corden	TBA	Fox	Rise Films			
Dealies	Comedy	TBA	Joe Bennett	TBA	Netflix	Green Street Pictures		Flash	
Dealies	Comedy	TBA	Ted Travelstead	TBA	Netflix	Green Street Pictures		Flash	
Deano	Comedy	TBA	Dean Thomas	TBA	Hulu	Hooligan Animation			
Deano	Comedy	TBA	David Ferrier	TBA	Hulu	BBC Studios			
Deano	Comedy	TBA	David Ferrier	TBA	Hulu	20th Television Animation			
Demi-God	Live-action animated	TBA	Katie Greenway	TBA	Fox	Fox Entertainment			
Demi-God	Single-cam	TBA	Katie Greenway	TBA	Fox	Fox Entertainment			
Dirt Girls	Comedy	TBA	Victoria Vincent	TBA	Fox	Fox Entertainment			
Dirt Girls	Comedy	TBA	Victoria Vincent	TBA	Fox	Bento Box Entertainment			
Elfquest	Fantasy	TBA	TBA	TBA	Fox	Modern Magic			
Elfquest	Drama	TBA	TBA	TBA	Fox	Bento Box Entertainment			
Energon Universe	Action	TBA	TBA	TBA	TBA	Skybound Entertainment			
Energon Universe	Action	TBA	TBA	TBA	TBA	Hasbro Entertainment			
Faust	Action	TBA	Matteo Pizzolo	TBA	TBA	Sony Pictures Television			
Firefly	Sci-fi	TBA	TBA	TBA	TBA	Collision33			
Firefly	Sci-fi	TBA	TBA	TBA	TBA	20th Television Animation			
Untitled Game of Thrones spin-off(s)	Fantasy	TBA	TBA	TBA	HBO Max	TBA			
Untitled Game of Thrones spin-off(s)	Drama	TBA	TBA	TBA	HBO Max	TBA			
Gears of War	Military	TBA	TBA	TBA	Netflix	The Coalition			
Gears of War	Sci-fi	TBA	TBA	TBA	Netflix	Netflix Animation			
Gerald’s World		TBA	Dillon Francis	TBA	Fox	Wonderland Sound and Vision			
Gerald’s World		TBA	Spencer Porter	TBA	Fox	20th Television Animation			
Get Jiro!		TBA	TBA	TBA	Adult Swim	Warner Bros. Animation			
Ghetto Brilliance	Comedy	TBA	GaTa	TBA	Hulu	3 Arts Entertainment			
Ghetto Brilliance	Comedy	TBA	GaTa	TBA	Hulu	Onyx Collective			
Ghetto Brilliance	Comedy	TBA	GaTa	TBA	Hulu	20th Television Animation			
Glowing Up	Musical	TBA	Calderón Kellett	TBA	Amazon Prime Video	Amazon MGM Studios			
Glowing Up	Musical	TBA	Calderón Kellett	TBA	Amazon Prime Video	GloNation Studios			
Greater Good	Workplace comedy	TBA	Mike Barker	TBA	Fox	Fox Entertainment			
Greater Good	Workplace comedy	TBA	Stoney Sharp	TBA	Fox	Fox Entertainment			
Gumby		TBA	TBA	TBA	TBA	Bento Box Entertainment			
HAVOC!	Comedy	TBA	Michael Glouberman	TBA	Fox	Fox Entertainment			
HAVOC!	Comedy	TBA	Michael Glouberman	TBA	Fox	Bento Box Entertainment			
HAVOC!	Comedy	TBA	Michael Glouberman	TBA	Fox	CRE84U Entertainment			
Hawkmaster	Fantasy	TBA	Mark Andrews	TBA	Fox	Fox Entertainment			
Hawkmaster	Drama	TBA	Andrew Gordon	TBA	Fox	Bento Box Entertainment			
Heaven's Forest	Action	TBA	Warren Ellis	TBA	Netflix	Netflix Animation			
Heaven's Forest	Drama	TBA	Warren Ellis	TBA	Netflix	Powerhouse Animation Studios			
Heist Brothers		TBA	Genndy Tartakovsky	TBA	Adult Swim	Cartoon Network Studios		Traditional	
Hellicious		TBA	TBA	TBA	TBS	Said and Done Entertainment			
Hellicious		TBA	TBA	TBA	TBS	Josephson Entertainment			
Hit Squad		TBA	TBA	TBA	TBA	Mr Morris Productions			
Hit Squad		TBA	TBA	TBA	TBA	Anderson Entertainment			
Hit Squad		TBA	TBA	TBA	TBA	Warner Bros. Animation			
Hit Squad		TBA	TBA	TBA	TBA	Hanna-Barbera Studios Europe			
His Majesty's Dragon	Drama	TBA	TBA	TBA	Fox	Fox Entertainment			
His Majesty's Dragon	Drama	TBA	TBA	TBA	Fox	Bento Box Entertainment			
His Majesty's Dragon	Drama	TBA	TBA	TBA	Fox	Orion Television			
The Hobblepots		TBA	Ben Schwartz	TBA	ABC	20th Television Animation			
The Hobblepots		TBA	Ben Schwartz	TBA	ABC	Mortal Media			
The Hobblepots		TBA	Ben Schwartz	TBA	ABC	Rooster Teeth			
How to Be Black		TBA	Baratunde Thurston	TBA	ABC	20th Television Animation			
Joe Dirt		TBA	TBA	TBA	Fox	Doug Robinson Productions			
Joe Dirt		TBA	TBA	TBA	Fox	Sony Pictures Television			
Joe Dirt		TBA	TBA	TBA	Fox	Fox Entertainment			
Journey to the Center of the Internet		TBA	Jon Eidson	TBA	Hulu	20th Television Animation			
Journey to the Center of the Internet		TBA	Nick Smith	TBA	Hulu	20th Television Animation			
Keeping Up with the Joneses	Comedy	TBA	Hugh Davidson	TBA	Adult Swim	Warner Bros. Animation		Flash	
Keeping Up with the Joneses	Comedy	TBA	Rachel Ramras	TBA	Adult Swim	Warner Bros. Animation		Traditional	
Keeping Up with the Joneses	Comedy	TBA	Larry Dorf	TBA	Adult Swim	Warner Bros. Animation		Traditional	
The Kids from S.I.P.P.Y.	Action	TBA	Branson Reese	TBA	Hulu	Underground			
The Kids from S.I.P.P.Y.	Comedy	TBA	Nicole Silverberg	TBA	Hulu	20th Television Animation			
Lady Danger		TBA	TBA	TBA	Amazon Freevee	G-Unit Film & TV			
Lady Danger		TBA	TBA	TBA	Amazon Freevee	Make Good Content			
Lady Danger		TBA	TBA	TBA	Amazon Freevee	Starburns Industries			
Lore Olympus		TBA	TBA	TBA	Amazon Prime Video	The Jim Henson Company			
Lore Olympus		TBA	TBA	TBA	Amazon Prime Video	Amazon MGM Studios			
Lyle & Caroline		TBA	TBA	TBA	Fox	Fox Entertainment			
Lyle & Caroline		TBA	TBA	TBA	Fox	Lionsgate Television			
Lyle & Caroline		TBA	TBA	TBA	Fox	3 Arts Entertainment			
Mikey and Miguel		TBA	Tara Reid	TBA	TBA	Instant Entertainment			
Mister Miracle	Superhero	TBA	TBA	TBA	TBA	Warner Bros. Animation			
Mister Miracle	Superhero	TBA	TBA	TBA	TBA	DC Studios			
Monstress		TBA	Steven Maeda	TBA	Amazon Prime Video	Amazon MGM Studios			
The Movers	Workplace comedy	TBA	TBA	TBA	Fox	Fox Entertainment			
The Movers	Workplace comedy	TBA	TBA	TBA	Fox	Bento Box Entertainment			
The Multivorce	Comedy	TBA	Kirker Butler	TBA	Paramount+	Kapital Entertainment			
The Multivorce	Comedy	TBA	Scott Mosier	TBA	Paramount+	CBS Studios			
My Two Cars	Comedy	TBA	Dan Licata	TBA	Adult Swim	Green Street Pictures			
My Two Cars	Comedy	TBA	Joe Pera	TBA	Adult Swim	Williams Street			
NIMH	Drama	TBA	TBA	TBA	Fox	Fox Entertainment			
NIMH	Drama	TBA	TBA	TBA	Fox	Orion Television			
Oaklandia	Sitcom	TBA	Daniel Dominguez	TBA	Amazon Prime Video	Amazon MGM Studios			
Oaklandia	Sitcom	TBA	Daniel Dominguez	TBA	Amazon Prime Video	Wild West Picture Show Productions			
Ocean Village		TBA	TBA	TBA	Fox	Fox Entertainment			
Ocean Village		TBA	TBA	TBA	Fox	Bento Box Entertainment			
Odd Jobs		TBA	Mike McMahan	TBA	Amazon Prime Video	Titmouse, Inc.			
Odd Jobs		TBA	Dominic Dierkes	TBA	Amazon Prime Video	CBS Studios			
Odd Jobs		TBA	Dominic Dierkes	TBA	Amazon Prime Video	Amazon MGM Studios			
The Post Guard		TBA	Thomas Lennon	TBA	Fox	Fox Entertainment			
The Post Guard		TBA	Thomas Lennon	TBA	Fox	Bento Box Entertainment			
Powers	Action	TBA	TBA	TBA	Netflix	Dark Horse Entertainment			
Prince Wawa		TBA	Jon Hurwitz	TBA	Fox	Fox Entertainment			
Prince Wawa		TBA	Josh Heald	TBA	Fox	Counterbalance Entertainment			
Prince Wawa		TBA	Hayden Schlossberg	TBA	Fox	Sony Pictures Television			
RAW10		TBA	Dan Dominguez	TBA	TBA	Rooster Teeth			
RAW10		TBA	Dan Dominguez	TBA	TBA	wiip			
RAW10		TBA	Dan Dominguez	TBA	TBA	McFarlane Films			
Ricky & Cricket	Comedy	TBA	Peter Murrieta	TBA	Amazon Prime Video	Amazon MGM Studios			
Ricky & Cricket	Comedy	TBA	Isaac Gonzalez	TBA	Amazon Prime Video	3 Arts Entertainment			
Ricky & Cricket	Comedy	TBA	Erik Rivera	TBA	Amazon Prime Video	3 Arts Entertainment			
Rude Dog	Comedy	TBA	Nic Izzi	TBA	TBA	RED20			
Saloon		TBA	Elliott Kalan	TBA	Fox	Fox Entertainment			
Saloon		TBA	Jenny Jaffe	TBA	Fox	SideCar			
Shell Beach		TBA	TBA	TBA	Fox	Fox Entertainment			
Shell Beach		TBA	TBA	TBA	Fox	Bento Box Entertainment			
Something is Killing the Children	Action	TBA	TBA	TBA	TBA	BOOM! Studios			
Something is Killing the Children	Horror	TBA	TBA	TBA	TBA	Blumhouse Productions			
Standing By	Comedy	TBA	Dan Levy	TBA	Hulu	Not a Real Production Company		Flash	
Standing By	Comedy	TBA	Dan Levy	TBA	Hulu	Straight on Till Morning Productions		Flash	
Standing By	Comedy	TBA	Ally Pankiw	TBA	Hulu	Bento Box Entertainment		Flash	
Standing By	Comedy	TBA	Ally Pankiw	TBA	Hulu	20th Television Animation		Flash	
Swap Meet		TBA	TBA	TBA	Hulu	Mortal Media			
Swap Meet		TBA	TBA	TBA	Hulu	Sony Pictures Television			
Swap Meet		TBA	TBA	TBA	Hulu	20th Television Animation			
Taskmasters		TBA	Brian Keith Etheridge	TBA	Fox	Fox Entertainment			
Taskmasters		TBA	Brendon Walsh	TBA	Fox	Fox Entertainment			
Taskmasters		TBA	Johnny Ryan	TBA	Fox	Bento Box Entertainment			
Temporary Humans	Comedy	TBA	TBA	TBA	Fox	Fox Entertainment			
Temporary Humans	Comedy	TBA	TBA	TBA	Fox	Sony Pictures Television			
The Trenches	Comedy	TBA	Drew Goddard	TBA	FX	Floyd County Productions			
The Trenches	Comedy	TBA	Drew Goddard	TBA	FX	Goddard Textiles			
The Trenches	Comedy	TBA	Drew Goddard	TBA	FX	20th Television Animation			
Uptown Bodega	Comedy	TBA	Oz Rodriguez	TBA	HBO Max	3 Arts Entertainment			
Uptown Bodega	Comedy	TBA	Lemon Andersen	TBA	HBO Max	Universal Television			
Wytches	Horror	TBA	TBA	TBA	Amazon Prime Video	Plan B Entertainment			
Wytches	Supernatural	TBA	TBA	TBA	Amazon Prime Video	Project 51 Productions			
Wytches	Supernatural	TBA	TBA	TBA	Amazon Prime Video	Amazon MGM Studios			
Zoo P.D.	Comedy	TBA	Alex Carter	TBA	Fox	Kapital Entertainment			
Zoo P.D.	Comedy	TBA	Alex Carter	TBA	Fox	Bento Box Entertainment			

== See also ==
- List of adult animated television series
  - List of adult animated television series before 1990
  - List of adult animated television series of the 1990s
- LGBT representation in adult animation
- Modern animation in the United States
- Lists of animated feature films
- Independent animation
- Animation in the United States in the television era
- Cartoon violence
