= List of adult animated television series before 1990 =

This is a list of adult animated television series before 1990 (including streaming television series); that is, animated programs targeted towards audiences aged 18 and over in mind. Works in this medium could be considered adult for any number of reasons, which include the incorporation of explicit or suggestive sexual content, graphic violence, profane language, dark humour, or other thematic elements inappropriate for children. Works in this genre may explore philosophical, political, or social issues. Some productions are noted for their complex and/or experimental storytelling and animation techniques. Adult animation is typically defined as animation which skews toward adults. It is also described as something that "formative youths should stay far, far away from" or has adult humor and comes in various styles, but especially sitcoms and comedies. These animations can also "appeal to wide swaths of viewers," including those aged 18–34. AdWeek called adult animation "animated projects aimed at grown-ups, not kids."

In North America, there is children's animation, adult animation, and young adult animation, with various mature animations in the United States, especially in television series. This page mainly includes series in North America and Europe, on programming blocks such as Adult Swim, Animation Domination, Adult Swim (in Canada), and others, with other mature animations, including web series and animated films covered on other pages. These series should not be confused with cartoon pornography.

== List ==
=== United States ===
Title	Genre	Seasons/episodes	Show creator(s)	Original release	Network	Studio	Age rating	Technique	Source
The Flintstones	Sitcom	6 seasons, 166 episodes	William Hanna; Joseph Barbera	September 30, 1960 – April 1, 1966	ABC	Hanna-Barbera Productions	TV-G	Traditional	
Where's Huddles?	Sitcom	1 season, 10 episodes	William Hanna	July 1, 1970 – September 2, 1970	CBS	Hanna-Barbera	TV-G	Traditional	
Where's Huddles?	Sitcom	1 season, 10 episodes	Joseph Barbera	July 1, 1970 – September 2, 1970	CBS	Hanna-Barbera	TV-G	Traditional	
Wait Till Your Father Gets Home	Sitcom	3 seasons, 48 episodes	William Hanna	September 12, 1972 – October 8, 1974	Syndication	Hanna-Barbera Productions	TV-PG	Traditional	
Wait Till Your Father Gets Home	Sitcom	3 seasons, 48 episodes	Joseph Barbera	September 12, 1972 – October 8, 1974	Syndication	Hanna-Barbera Productions	TV-PG	Traditional	
Jokebook	Animated comedy	1 season, 7 episodes (Note: 4 unaired)	William Hanna	April 23, 1982 – May 7, 1982	NBC	Hanna-Barbera Productions		Traditional	
Jokebook	Animated comedy	1 season, 7 episodes	Joseph Barbera	April 23, 1982 – May 7, 1982	NBC	Hanna-Barbera Productions		Traditional	
The Simpsons shorts for The Tracey Ullman Show	Sitcom	3 seasons, 48 episodes	Matt Groening	April 19, 1987 – May 14, 1989	Fox	Gracie Films Klasky Csupo	TV-PG	Traditional	
Stevie and Zoya	Action	1 season, 13 episodes	Joe Horne	1987 – 1989	MTV	MTV Animation	TV-14	Traditional	
The Simpsons	Sitcom	38 seasons, 815 episodes	Matt Groening	December 17, 1989 – present	Fox	Gracie Films	TV-PG; TV-14 (some episodes); TV-G (a few episodes); TV-MA (one episode)	Traditional	

=== United Kingdom ===
Title	Genre	Seasons/episodes	Show creator(s)	Original release	Network	Studio	Technique	Source
Dick Spanner, P.I.	Comedy	1 season, 22 episodes	Terry Adlam	May 3, 1987 -September 27, 1987	Channel 4	Virgin Group	Stop-motion	

== See also ==
- List of adult animated television series
  - List of adult animated television series of the 2010s
  - List of adult animated television series of the 2020s
- Modern animation in the United States
- Lists of animated feature films
- Independent animation
- Animation in the United States in the television era
- Cartoon violence
