= List of adult animated television series =

This is a list of adult animated television series (including streaming television series); that is, animated programs targeted towards audiences aged 18 to 34 and over in mind. Works in this medium could be considered adult for any number of reasons, which include the incorporation of nudity, explicit or suggestive sexual content, graphic violence, profane language, dark humour, or other thematic elements inappropriate for children. Works in this genre may explore philosophical, political, or social issues. Some productions are noted for their complex and/or experimental storytelling and animation techniques. Adult animation is typically defined as animation which skews toward adults. It is also described as something that "formative youths should stay far, far away from" or has adult humor and comes in various styles, but especially sitcoms and comedies. These animations can also "appeal to wide swaths of viewers," including those aged 18–34. AdWeek called adult animation "animated projects aimed at grown-ups, not kids."

In North America, there is children's animation, adult animation, and young adult animation, with various mature animations in the United States, especially in television series. This page mainly includes series in North America and Europe, on programming blocks such as Adult Swim, Animation Domination, Adult Swim (in Canada), and others, with other mature animations, including web series and animated films covered on other pages. These series should not be confused with cartoon pornography. This page does not include adult-oriented animations originated from Asian countries, Japan, China, South Korea, and other Asian nations, as such animations are more common there.

== Lists by decade ==
- List of adult animated television series before 1990
- List of adult animated television series of the 1990s
- List of adult animated television series of the 2000s
- List of adult animated television series of the 2010s
- List of adult animated television series of the 2020s

== See also ==
- Lists of animated feature films
- List of adult animated feature films
- Modern animation in the United States
- Independent animation
- Animation in the United States in the television era
- Cartoon violence
