= Adult animation =

Animation aimed at adults

Adult animation (Note: Also known as mature animation, mature cartoon or adult cartoon, and infrequently as adult-oriented animation or mature-oriented animation and adult-oriented cartoon or mature-oriented cartoon.) is animation in the form of films and television series that caters to general interests and is mainly targeted and marketed towards teenagers, young adults, and mature audiences as opposed to children or all-ages audiences.

== Characteristics and themes ==
Animated films, television series, and web series in this medium could be considered adult for any number of reasons, which include the incorporation of dark humour, violence, adult humour, mature themes, shock value, toilet humour, nudity, sexual content (either explicit or suggestive), profanity, political themes, or other thematic elements inappropriate for children and younger viewers. Works may explore philosophical, political, satirical, or social issues. Some animated productions are noted for their complex or experimental storytelling and animation techniques; the latter with many distinct styles.

Many working in animation feel that the public perception is that animation is either a genre for children or a sitcom for adults. The expression "Animation is a medium, not a genre" has become a way to advocate for more variety in animated projects with compelling mature stories and intricate artistry. Creators and young adult audiences crave narratively sophisticated animated shows with a commitment to aesthetics and complex mature themes. Series like Primal, Arcane, Love, Death & Robots, Hazbin Hotel, Rick and Morty, Scavengers Reign, Blue Eye Samurai, and Invincible showcase the narrative potential of adult animation. Some critics have called this artistic evolution the "Adult Animation Boom" or the "Adult Animation Revolution."

== Definitions ==
Adult animation is typically defined as animation that is aimed at an adult audience. It is described as animation that has adult humour, themes, situations, or explicit language that adults, and often teens, are more likely to understand or relate to. It can come in various genres, but sitcoms and other comedies are the most common. On television, such animations often run in the evening, but they are not generally pornographic or obscene. AdWeek called adult animation "animated projects aimed at grown-ups, not kids." They also focus on issues that adults handle, and often use irreverent humour "that has no limits—bouncing between funny and offensive" while evoking a "balance of reality and fantasy." They may also contain violence or sexual themes.

== See also ==
=== Animation and genres ===
- Animation in the United States in the television era
- Arthouse animation
- Black comedy
- Independent animation
- Modern animation in the United States

=== Adult animation lists ===
- Adult animation by country
- Cartoon violence
- List of adult animated television series
- List of adult animated web series
- List of adult animated feature films
- List of highest-grossing adult animated films

=== Other animation ===
- Firsts in animation
- History of animation
- List of years in animation
