= Cartoon violence =

Representation of violent actions in animation

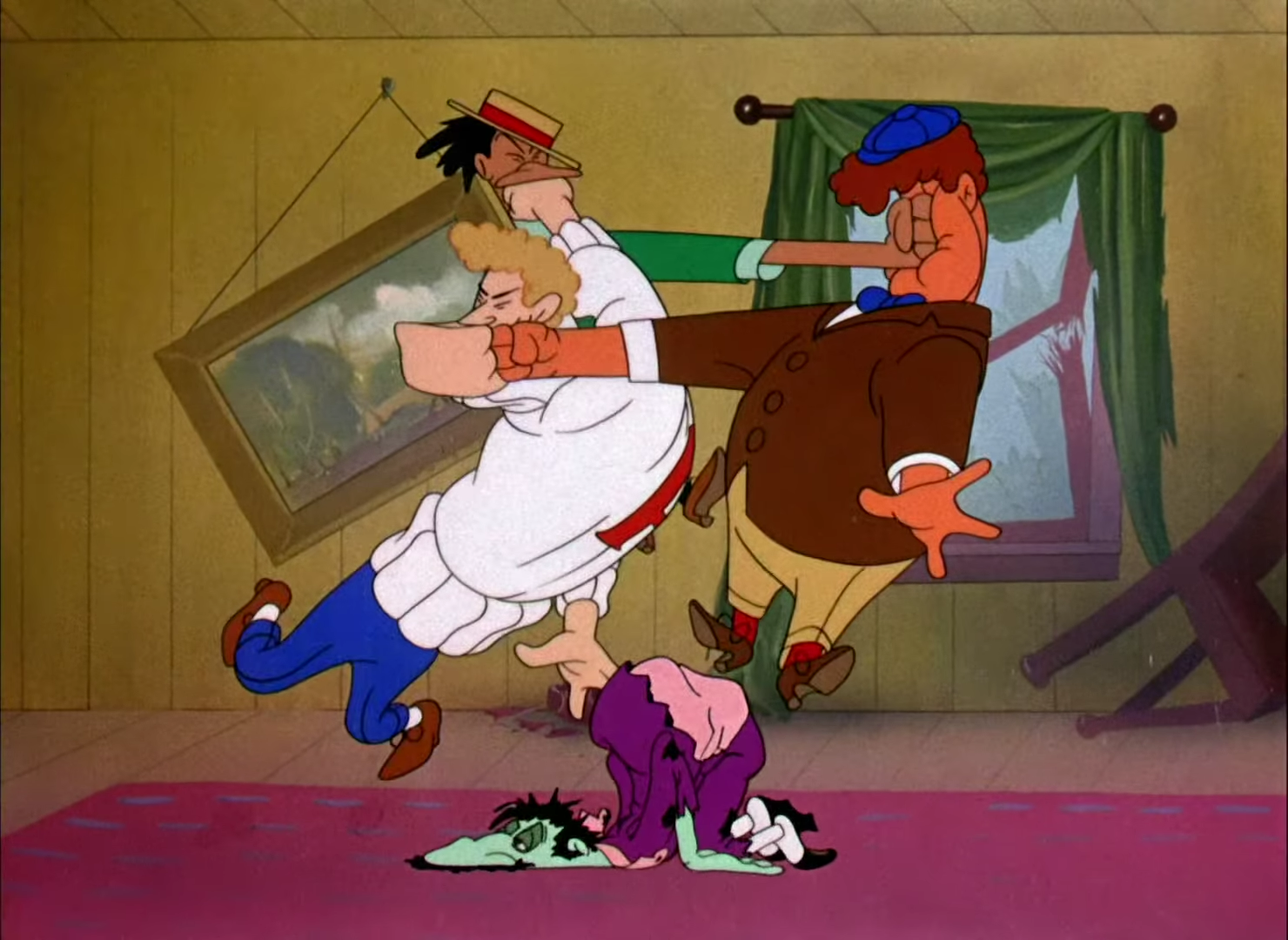
A scene of comedic violence in The Dover Boys at Pimento University

Cartoon violence is the representation of violent actions involving animated characters and situations. This may include violence where a character is unharmed after the action has been inflicted. Animated violence is sometimes partitioned into comedic and non-comedic cartoon violence.

Earlier cartoons demonstrated that using violence was a successful method for capturing viewership. Contemporary animated shows have adopted this approach and have elevated their levels of violence and graphic content. Saturday morning cartoons are considered the most popular time for children to witness violence on television because cartoons have more violence than comedies and dramas.

== History ==
Cartoon violence has a long history of being used to incite violence against minorities, beginning with the 1898 Wilmington, North Carolina newspaper cartoons. Since its inception, theatrical animated cartoons in the golden age of American animation were known for including a high degree of violence, only limited by their inability to depict nudity or gore due to the enforcement of the Hays Code. Warner Bros. Cartoons' productions became highly popular and appealed to a wide audience by balancing cartoon violence with clever humor and likable characters, influencing other studios such as Metro-Goldwyn-Mayer and Walter Lantz Productions, which had recruited Warner Bros. alumni to help modernize their output. This would come to an end as the advent of television meant reduced budgets for both theatrical and televised productions causing studios to resort to dialogue-based humor to compensate for the use of limited animation. After the golden age of American animation, television censorship rules limited the amount of cartoon violence allowed in children's programs and contributed to the quality of Hanna-Barbera and Filmation's series.

== Effects ==
Effects of cartoon violence on youth remain controversial. Research has generally been divided on this issue with no consensus reached regarding the effects of violence on behavior.

One such conclusion is that gender does not play a crucial role to the research. An article published by Andrew J. Weaver and his team provides data showing boys do prefer to watch cartoon violence more than girls but they still both equally enjoy them. It is also mentioned that children might just have a natural inclination towards watching violence.

Huesmann (2007) claimed that watching violent cartoons can make young children more aggressive. Steuer, Applefield and Smith claim that children emulate cartoon characters' activities, even when they aren't depicted as being human. Bandura, Ross, and Ross (1963) point out that what might seem clearly fictional to an adult might seem real to young children. Blumberg, Bierwirth and Schwartz claim the impact of exposure to violence may remain regardless of whether children choose to imitate it. This impact can be considered harmful to a child if that form of violence was an on-screen character death. With present day cartoons having an increased rate of on-screen death, if a child is not emotionally prepared this may lead to harmful effects. But if the subject of death is handled correctly, this can give children an early positive understanding of death.

=== Influence on real-life behavior ===
Opinions on the influences of cartoon violence vary. Some researchers believe that high levels of violence in cartoons can make children more aggressive. Their studies also found that young children tend to mimic the negative behavior they see on television. In a year, a child watching an average of 2 hours of cartoons a day will have seen 10,000 violent acts. Studies have shown that watching more cartoon violence is associated with higher levels of aggression among Taiwanese children. Cartoons targeted towards young children oftentimes have higher levels of violence compared to their adult counterparts.

According to an article published by Steven J. Kirsh, across the early and middle childhood, laboratory experiments using cartoons with comedic violence have consistently failed to demonstrate significant differences in reality-oriented aggression. By contrast, field experiments have consistently shown that aggressive behavior towards peers increases following the viewing of non-comedic violent cartoons. Depending on the type of cartoon, shows with cartoon violence could influence other behaviors in young children. An example of this is shown in a study where superhero cartoons were analyzed. A common theme emerged that police were not well equipped, and it is up to the heroes to take justice into their own hands. This raises concern that children may perceive this theme as the real world. Cartoon violence has become more intense and frequent in the modern age.

However, some researchers propose that other factors contribute to the impact of violence on children. For instance, research from 2015 has suggested that cartoon violence does not have a direct impact on children.

Blumberg, Bierwirth and Schwartz argue that children possess the ability to differentiate real life from animation, as well as the ability to understand right from wrong. They know that violent acts qualify as immoral and infringe on the welfare of others, therefore the violence witnessed in cartoons will register as "make believe" to children and will not be applied into their real lives. Children who were affected by harmful content are often excluded from the preceding discussions. Adults create idealized opinions for the general "child" instead of basing their beliefs over the feelings and experiences of a hurt child.

With technology improving, the youth can easily access the internet on a daily basis. Along with these technological improvements, settings at home have changed, creating environments where children are often left unmonitored. This adds further complications because it is difficult to calculate what influences the youth without knowing what they are consuming.

=== Alternative propositions ===
Publishers Jiayu Li, Xiaoli Zhang, and Qian Du did a study on children with left-behind adolescents and the aggression they have. The study showed that nearly all who were struggling with this aggression had very little if not any relationship with their father. As for a mother's absence or lack of involvement in a child's life could also lead to higher levels of aggression. Whether or not cartoon violence leads to higher levels of aggression can be hard to determine with the lack of a parental figure.

== Restriction ==
With parents' growing concern for how much violence was being shown in cartoons, some initiatives were put into place. The first is the Children's Television Act, which requires broadcasters to air shows which are educational and provide information for the children. The second initiative is the V-chip legislation that gives parents the opportunity to block out violent shows from their television. The third legislation against violent cartoons is the National Cable Television Association's TV Parental Guidelines, which is a system that rates the Television shows based on their contents.

=== Fantasy violence ===
In action-adventure oriented cartoons, the most consistent avenue of addressing violence is the use of a form of fantasy violence in which no one is injured or killed on screen. In science fiction cartoons, for example, enemy forces are typically portrayed as robots so they can be destroyed in bulk by the heroes without concern over killing living beings. In cases where tanks, aircraft, and other war vehicles piloted by living beings are destroyed in combat, time is always given for their operators to escape or bail out.

Realistic firearms are often replaced with futuristic beam weapons which still seldom hit anyone. Swords and other bladed weapons may be prohibited from being used as offensive weapons, but may be used defensively or be depicted as magical weapons. Guns are seen in 26% of violent incidents, specifically in cartoons based on real life. Direct violence is frequently limited to hand to hand combat where directly kicking or punching another character may or may not be allowed.

The majority of action adventure cartoons over the past decades have used these methods of depicting dynamic action scenes, although their use has been heavily criticized as "sanitized violence". This type of violence refers to when minimal to no physical harm is shown, as well as little attention is paid to the long-term effects.

In rare circumstances where blood is shown it will be censored with different colors. Despite studies demonstrating that this television category has the most violence, many individuals do not consider sanitized cartoons to be violent. Cartoons based on the Voltron, Transformers, G.I. Joe, and Masters of the Universe franchises (especially the versions produced during the 1980s) are notable examples using variations on fantasy violence.
