= Thematic elements =

Films ratings board terminology

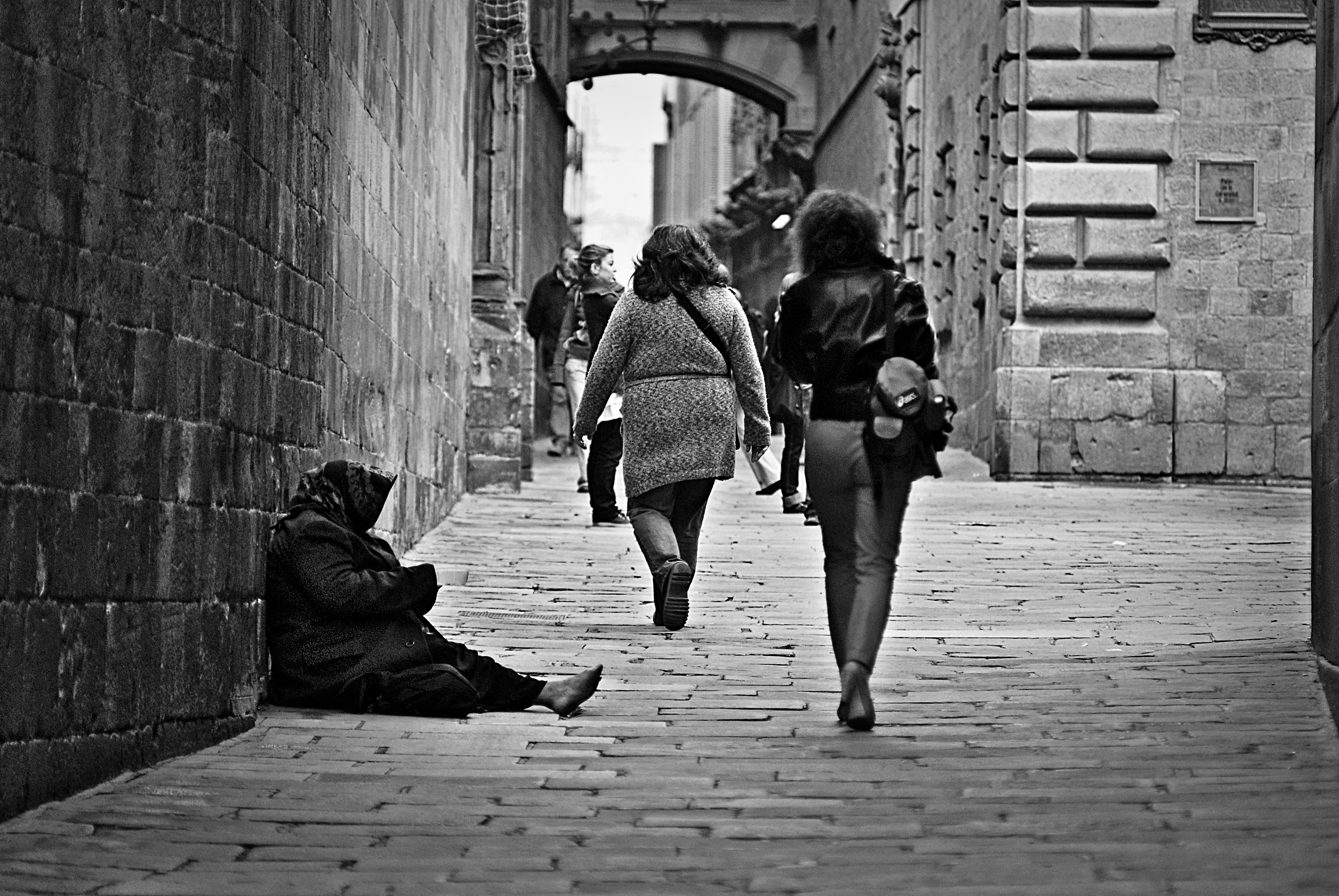
Poverty and corruption are common thematic elements in film.

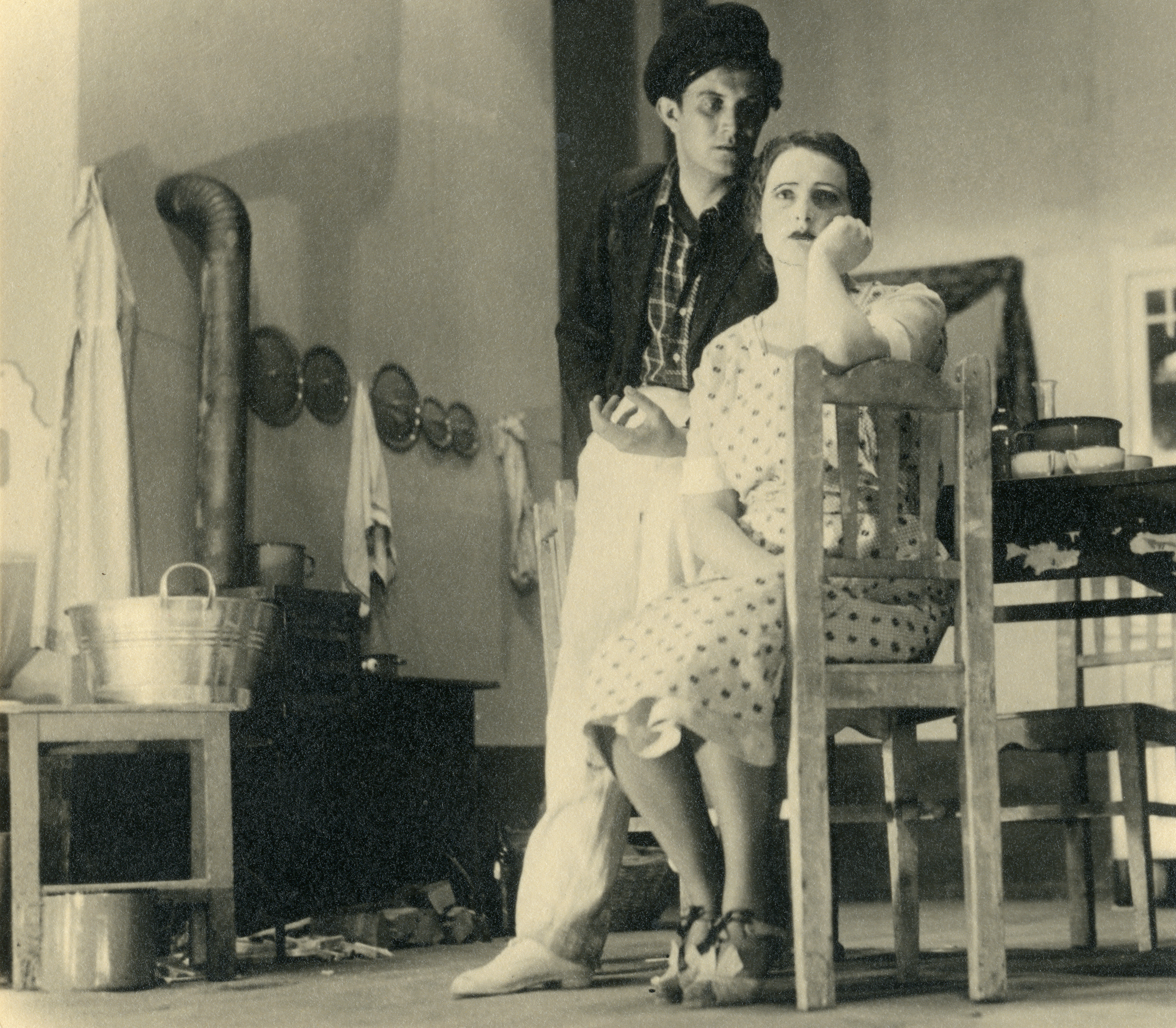
Grief and dysfunctional households are also common thematic material.

"Thematic elements", or "thematic material", is a term used by the Motion Picture Association and other film ratings boards to highlight elements of a film that do not fit into the traditional categories such as violence, sex, drug use, nudity, and language, but may also involve some degree of objectionable content. This rating reason raises a warning to parents and guardians to learn more about a film before they allow their children to view it.

In Australia, the term is equivalent to "adult themes", "mature themes" or just "themes" (which has been in use since 2005).

== Subject matter ==
These thematic elements may include abortion, addiction, animal cruelty, breastfeeding, child abuse, corruption, coming-of-age issues, non-violent crimes, death, defiance, disability (physical and/or mental), discrimination, disease, driving under the influence, dysfunctional families, dystopian societies, disasters, existential crises, gambling, hate, hazing, homelessness, infidelity, miscarriage, mental illness, politics, poverty, religion, self-harm, social issues, suicide, STDs, teenage pregnancy, truancy, verbal abuse, war and other serious subject matter or mature discussions that some parents and guardians feel may not be appropriate for their young children.

Thematic elements appear in many PG and PG-13-rated dramas and, primarily, documentary films. In addition, they can also be present in a number of animated, fantasy and romantic comedy films, and as well as psychological horror and supernatural horror films.
