= Sexual content =

Material depicting sexual behavior

In media discourse, sexual content is material depicting sexual behavior. The sexual behavior involved may be explicit, implicit sexual behavior such as flirting, or include sexual language and euphemisms.

Sexual content is a large factor in most content rating systems, such as those used for television programs, films, and video games. Its increasing availability, especially the Internet, has increased people's exposure to sexual content. Such exposure is not always wanted.

Research has suggested that exposure to sexual content affects people's thoughts and behavior, though there is disagreement as to the extent of the effect. Gert Martin Hald, a psychologist at the University of Copenhagen, who authored a study which found that watching "sexually explicit media" only accounted for 0.3 to 4 percent of behavior changes, said, "Our data suggest that other factors such as personal dispositions — specifically sensation-seeking — rather than consumption of sexually explicit material may play a more important role in a range of sexual behaviors of adolescents and young adults."

== Sexual content in film ==
Sexual content has been found in films since the early days of the industry, and the presentation of aspects of sexuality in film, especially human sexuality, has been controversial since the development of the medium. Films which display or suggest sexual behavior have been criticized by religious groups or have been banned or censored by governments, although attitudes have changed significantly over the years and a more permissive social environment has developed in certain parts of the world, notably in Europe, North America, Australia and New Zealand. In countries with a film rating system, films which contain explicit sex scenes typically receive a restricted classification. Nudity in film may be regarded as sexual or as non-sexual.

An erotic film is usually a film that has an erotic quality, meaning that it may arouse sexual feelings, even if the stated or suggested intention of the film maker is to induce philosophical contemplation concerning the aesthetics of sexual desire, sensuality and romantic love.

== Sexual content in video games ==
Sexual content in video games has featured since the early days of the industry, and games featuring sexual content can be found on most platforms and can be of any video game genre.

The inclusion of sex in games has been subject to varying levels of controversy over the decades, sometimes resulting in calls for increased regulation and legislation dealing directly with adult content.

In Western gaming, the promise of sexual content in games is commonly used as a marketing tool, but many highly sexualized games do not feature any explicitly adult content. Though some games do use sex acts or nudity as a narrative device, in-game reward, or a gameplay element, purely pornographic games are uncommon.

However, the Japanese pornographic eroge subgenre is popular worldwide. First appearing in the 1980s, these games vary significantly in narrative complexity as well as the level of interactivity, taking forms ranging from the visual novel to virtual reality experiences.

== See also ==
- Censorship
- Clop (erotic fan art)
- History of erotic depictions
- Erotica
- Not safe for work
- Obscenity
- Parental Advisory
- Pornography
- Rule 34
