= List of volumes of Flight =

Flight is a graphic novel anthology edited by Kazu Kibuishi and published annually since 2004. Originally published by Image Comics, it has since moved to Ballantine Books, an imprint of Random House. The most recent volume is number 8, published June 28, 2011.

Flight
Volume	Publication Date	Contents	Publisher	Pages	ISBN
1	August 25, 2004	"Air and Water" - Enrico Casarosa "Copper: Maiden Voyage" - Kazu Kibuishi "Hugo Earheart" - Jake Parker "I Wish..." - Vera Brosgol "Paper and String" - Jen Wang "Taj Mahal" - Neil Babra "Formidable" - Bengal "Outside My Window" - Khang Le "Untitled" - Chris Appelhans "Tumbleweed" - Catia Chien "Fall" - Catia Chien "Dummy Brother" - Jacob Magraw-Mickelson "All Time Low" - Dylan Meconis and Bill Mudron "The Maiden and the River Spirit" - Derek Kirk Kim "Beneath the Leaves: Jump" - Rad Sechrist "Tug McTaggart, Circus Detective" - Phil Craven "Deep Blue" - Phil Craven "Wing" - Joel Carroll "Migrations" - Kean Soo "Faith" - Erika Moen, colors by Hope Larson "The Bowl" - Clio Chiang "Copper: Picnic" - Kazu Kibuishi "Create" - Erika Moen, colors by Kazu Kibuishi	Image Comics	208	ISBN 1-58240-381-3
2	April 27, 2005	"Inner Sanctum" - Michel Gagné "Solomon Fix" - Doug TenNapel "Jelly Fruit" - Catia Chien "The Robot and the Sparrow" - Jake Parker "Dead Soul's Day Out" - Sonny Liew "Monster Slayers" - Khang Le "The Golden Temple" - Neil Babra "Dance of the Sugar Plums" - Don Hertzfeldt "Destiny Express" - Jen Wang "The Orange Grove" - Kazu Kibuishi "Weather Vain" - Hope Larson "Heads Up" - Becky Cloonan "Tendergrass" - Matthew Woodson "Last Things Last" - Kean Soo "Cellmates" - Phil Craven "The Ride" - Rodolphe Guenoden "Laika" - Doug Holgate "Ghost Trolley" - Rad Sechrist "Wilford's Stroll" - Justin Ridge "Impossible" - Herval "Dust on the Shelves" - Bannister "This Time!" - Clio Chiang "Blip Pop " - Ryan Sias "Mouse Trap" - Johane Matte "Sirius and Betelgeuse" - Jeff Smith "The Flying Bride" - Giuseppe Ferrario "The Plank" - Ben Hatke "Icarus" - Johane Matte "A Test For Cenri" - Amy Kim Ganter "La Sonadora " - Joana Carneiro "Sky Blue" - Kness "Beisbol" - Richard Pose "Salmoning" - Vera Brosgol	Image Comics	432	ISBN 1-58240-477-1
3	June 27, 2006	“Underworld” - Michel Gagné “Old Oak Trees” - Tony Cliff “The Edge” - Ben Hatke "Beneath the Leaves: Lemming City- Rad Sechrist “Hunter” - Johane Matte “Jellaby: The Tea Party” - Kean Soo “The Rescue” - Phil Craven “The Lumbering Beast” - Joey Weiser “Saturday” - Israel Sanchez “The Cloud” - Bill Plympton “Earl D.” - Yoko Tanaka “Polaris” - Azad Injejikian “In Due Time” - Neil Babra “The Iron Gate” - Kazu Kibuishi “Message in a Bottle” - Rodolphe Guenoden “So Far, So Close” - Bannister “Voodoo” - Matthew Forsythe “Ad Astra” - Chuck BB “Conquest” - Becky Cloonan “Tea” - Reagan Lodge “One Little Miracle for a Hungry Swarm” - Alex Fuentes “Wurmler of the West” - Paul Harmon “The Brave Sea” - Steve Hamaker “The Great Bunny Migration” - Dave Roman “Snow Cap” - Matthew S. Armstrong “Lala and the Bean” - Khang Le	Ballantine Books	352	ISBN 0-345-49039-8
4	July 10, 2007	“The Saga of Rex: Castaway” - Michel Gagné “Food from the Sea” - Amy Kim Ganter “Farewell, Little Karla” - Thomas Herpich “Cyclops!” - Israel Sanchez “Little Trouble in the Big Top” - Vera Brosgol “The Window Makers” - Kazu Kibuishi “...and Hope for the Best” - JP Ahonen “The Forever Box” - Sarah Mensinga “The Blue Guitar” - Neil Babra “Igloo Head and Tree Head” - Scott Campbell “The Rabbit Mayor: A Mayan Folk Tale” - Jon Klassen “Roomie-Pal!” - Graham Annable “From Here to There...” - Joey Weiser “Tripod” - Bannister and Joel Carroll “The Vampyres of Salem” - Azad Injejikian “The Storm” - Pascal Campion “Big Wheels” - Ovi Nedelcu “To Grandma's” - Clio Chiang “Dinosaur Egg” - Raina Telgemeier “It's Dangerous to Sleep” - Dave Roman “Mystical Monkey” - Ryan Estrada “The Story of Binny” - Lark Pien “Cortina” - Fábio Moon “Twenty-four Hours” - Andrea Offermann “The Perfect Spot” - Phil Craven	Ballantine Books	344	ISBN 0-345-49040-1
5	July 22, 2008	“The Broken Path” - Michel Gagné "Delilah Dirk And The Aqueduct" - Tony Cliff “The Dragon” - Reagan Lodge “Béisbol 2” - Richard Pose “The Courier” - Kazu Kibuishi “Malinky Robot” - Sonny Liew “Worry Dolls” - JP Ahonen “Igloo Head and Tree Head in Disguise” - Scott Campbell “Evidence” - Graham Annable “N” - Phil Craven “The Changeling” - Sarah Mensinga “Mountains” - Matthew Bernier “Big Dome: Flowers for Mama” - Paul Rivoche “The Chosen One” - Dave Roman “Jellaby: Lost” - Kean Soo “Two Kids” - Bannister, colors by Steve Hamaker “Scenes in Which the Earth Stops Spinning” - John Martz and Ryan North “Timecat” - Joey Weiser “Voyage” - Kness and Made “On The Importance Of Space Travel” - Svetlana Chmakova “Seasons: Frank and Frank” - Chris Appelhans	Ballantine Books	368	ISBN 0-345-50589-1
6	July 21, 2009	“The Saga of Rex: Soulmates" - Michel Gagné “The Excitingly Mundane Life of Kenneth Shuri" - JP Ahonen “Daisy Kutter: Phantoms" - Kazu Kibuishi “Magnus the Misfit" - Graham Annable “Dead at Noon" - Rodolphe Guenoden “Epitaph" - Phil Craven “Walters" - Cory Godbey "Mate" - Andrea Offermann "Kidnapped" - Rad Sechrist "Cooking Duel" - Bannister "Dead Bunny" - Justin Ridge "The Z's" - Richard Pose "Jellaby: Hide and Seek" - Kean Soo "Fish N Chips: Even the Smallest Creatures" - Steve Hamaker "Long-Winded" - Mike Dutton	Ballantine Books	283	ISBN 978-0-345-50590-3
7	July 20, 2010	“The Saga of Rex: The Harvest” - Michel Gagné “The Courier: Shortcut” - Kazu Kibuishi “Live Bait” - Justin Gerard “Kenneth Shuri & the Big Sweep” - JP Ahonen “Premium Cargo” - Kostas Kiriakakis “Sustain This Song” - Leland Myrick “Overhead” - Stuart Livingston “Onere and Piccola” - Cory Godbey “Fairy Market” - Katie and Steven Shanahan “I've Decided to Become A Skeptic” - Dave Roman “Jellaby: Guardian Angel” - Kean Soo “Career Day” - Bannister and Grimaldi “Sentinels” - Jason Caffoe “King of Beasts: What's Yours Is Mine!” - Paul Harmon “TT Challenge” - Dermot Walshe “B.L.T.” - Drew Dernavich	Random House	288	ISBN 978-0-345-51737-1
8	June 28, 2011	“Encore” - Kostas Kiriakakis “Kenneth Shuri & the Wrong Kill” - JP Ahonen “Riddle” - Kyla Vanderklugt “The Clockmaker's Daughter” - Corey Godbey “Echoes” - Jason Caffoe “The Hollow Men” - Nicholas Kole “The Gift” - Kazu Kibuishi “The Black Fountain” - Tony Cliff “The Collector” - Leland Myrick “New Year's Day” - Sonny Liew “Buttons and Jim in What's Stopping the Gravy Train?” - Katie and Steven Shanahan “Jellaby: Who Needs Friends?” - Kean Soo “Igloo Head and Tree Head in Accomplishments” - Scott Campbell “Rematch!” - Dermot Walshe “Checkers” - Jake Parker “Migration” - Der-shing Helmer “Winged” - Grimaldi and Bannister “Periwinkle in Try, Try Again” - Matthew S. Armstrong	Ballantine Books	288	ISBN 978-0-345-51738-8
