= Young adult (disambiguation) =

A young adult is a person in their late teens or early twenties.

Young adult may refer to:

- Young adult literature, literature aimed at readers aged 12 to 18 years
- Young adult animation
- Young Adult (film), a 2011 American comedy-drama film
