= Kipo and the Age of Wonderbeasts =

2020 animated Netflix series

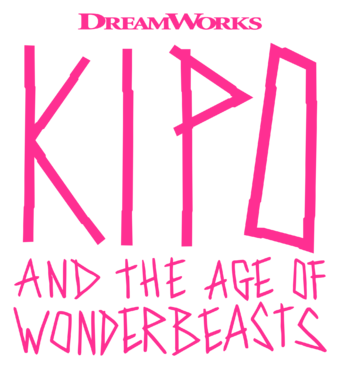
- Genre: Action; Adventure; Science fantasy; Comedy-drama; Post-apocalyptic
- Created by: Radford Sechrist
- Based on: Kipo by Radford Sechrist
- Developed by: Bill Wolkoff
- Showrunners: Radford Sechrist; Bill Wolkoff
- Directed by: Young Ki Yoon (chief)
- Voices of: Karen Fukuhara; Sydney Mikayla; Coy Stewart; Deon Cole; Dee Bradley Baker; Sterling K. Brown; Dan Stevens; Jee Young Han; Amy Landecker
- Theme music composer: Vanessa Ruby Sandberg
- Composer: Daniel Rojas
- Countries of origin: United States; South Korea
- Original language: English
- No. of seasons: 3
- No. of episodes: 30

Production
- Executive producers: Bill Wolkoff; Radford Sechrist; Yoo Jae Myung
- Producers: Kim Han Byeol; Park Sang Ah
- Running time: 23–24 minutes
- Production companies: DreamWorks Animation Television; Studio Mir

Original release
- Network: Netflix
- Release: January 14 – October 12, 2020

Kipo and the Age of Wonderbeasts is an animated television series created by Radford Sechrist and developed by Bill Wolkoff, adapted from Sechrist's 2015 webcomic Kipo. The series is produced by American company DreamWorks Animation Television in partnership with South Korean animation studio Mir.

The young adult animated series follows a teenage girl named Kipo Oak, who is searching for her father after being forced to flee from her burrow, and must explore the post-apocalyptic surface world ruled by mutated animals to find him. Along the way, she befriends human survivors Wolf and Benson, and the mutant animals Dave and Mandu.

The series has been critically acclaimed for its design, characterization, music, world-building, animation, voice acting, humor, diversity, and action sequences. The series is particularly notable for its representation of LGBT characters and characters of color. The series was removed from Netflix on June 26, 2026, due to the expiration of DreamWorks' license to keep the series on the streaming service.

== Plot ==
In 2020, animals mutated into anthropomorphic creatures called "mutes". Mutes rose up against the human race, forcing the majority of it to live in underground cities called burrows. In the 23rd century, Los Angeles has been reduced to a post-apocalyptic wasteland collectively known as "Las Vistas".

In the first season, Kipo Oak, a thirteen-year-old girl, is separated from her father Lio after their burrow is attacked by a "mega monkey", a colossal, mutated spider monkey. Traversing Las Vistas, she befriends Wolf, a cold and hardened girl who has been surviving on her own after her adoptive wolf family turned on her, the upbeat Benson and his insect companion Dave, and the mute pig Mandu. Together, they set out to find the burrow Kipo's community fled to after their first one was destroyed. During their adventures, Kipo discovers that she has the DNA of a mega jaguar, and can transform her body. As the five journey along they make many mute allies and enemies, including the tyrant Scarlemagne, a mandrill mute who intends to subjugate humanity with his mind-controlling pheromones and force the other mutes into an utopian empire which he will rule with a human army.

In the second season, Kipo learns she was experimented on with mute DNA by her parents before her birth, turning her into a half-human, half-jaguar hybrid, and that her mother Song, previously thought to be deceased, is actually the mega monkey who destroyed her burrow, mutated as a side effect from her pregnancy and mind-controlled with Scarlemagne's pheromones by Dr. Emilia, her parents' former employer who now leads a resistance group against mutes. She also discovers that Scarlemagne was originally an ordinary mandrill named Hugo whom Kipo's parents turned sentient and secretly raised as their son, but grew to hate them after they were forced to abandon him. Kipo frees Song from her mind control and defeats Scarlemagne, while Emilia plots to revert mutes back into normal animals.

In the third season, Kipo creates the "Human Mute Ultimate Friendship Alliance" (HMUFA) to fight Emilia, but struggles to make humans and mutes work together. Emilia creates an anti-mute cure with Kipo's DNA, and it is with this cure that Kipo turns her mother human again. Ultimately, Kipo succeeds in making peace between mutes and humans, reforming Scarlemagne in the process. With her plans foiled and unwilling to accept change, Emilia turns herself into a mega mute to kill Kipo and her friends, but she is defeated with Scarlemagne's help, who sacrifices himself to save Kipo. Five years later, Kipo happily lives on the surface where humans and mutes finally co-exist in harmony.

== Characters ==
=== Main ===
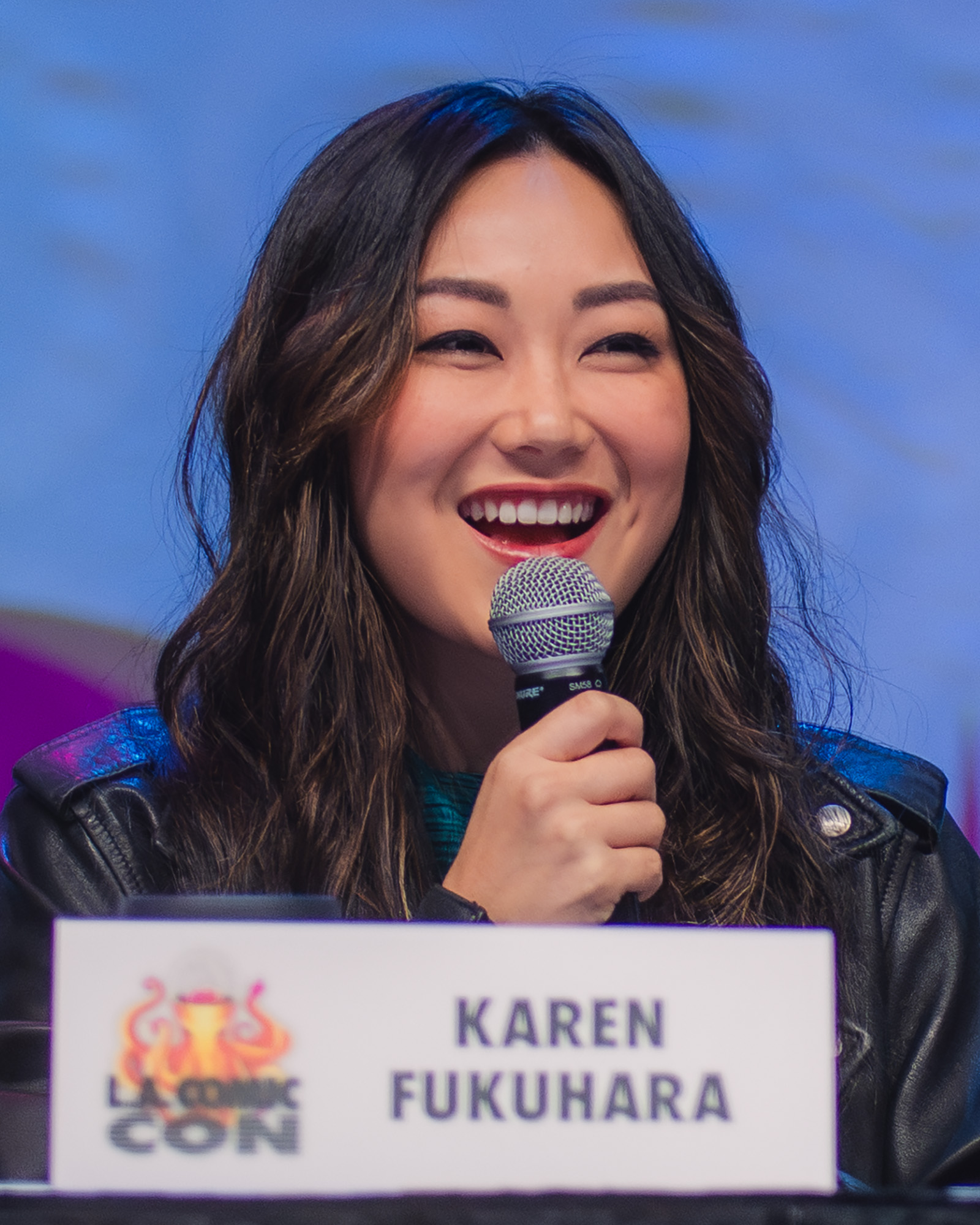
Karen Fukuhara voices Kipo.

- Kipo Oak (voiced by Karen Fukuhara) – An enthusiastic and curious young girl who is searching for her people. Later in the show, it is revealed that Kipo's parents injected her with mute DNA, giving her the powers of a huge purple jaguar.
- Wolf (voiced by Sydney Mikayla) – Kipo's best friend and adopted younger sister. A hardened and young survivor on the surface world who was raised by mutant wolves. She wields a spear made from the stinger of a deathstalker scorpion that she dubs "Stalkie".
- Benson Mekler (voiced by Coy Stewart) – A level-headed and happy-go-lucky surface survivor, Dave's best friend, and last of the "fanatics", a group previously at war with Dave's species for two centuries.
- Dave (voiced by Deon Cole) – A mutant insect and Benson's best friend who repeatedly molts from baby to child to teen to adult to elderly. Between his adult to elderly phase, he briefly assumes an extremely powerful, super saiyan-like form which has little to no longevity, a recurring gag. He is the last of his kind, a species of identical-looking insects who all shared the name Dave and were at war for over two centuries with the "fanatics" over a cooling fan.
- Mandu (voiced by Dee Bradley Baker) – A teal mutant pig with four eyes and six legs adopted by Kipo, who named her after a type of food prepared by her mother.
- Lio Oak (voiced by Sterling K. Brown) – Kipo's father, a scientist, and teacher of their underground community. He and Song were originally working for Dr. Emilia to turn mutes back into normal animals so humanity could reclaim the surface.
- Hugo "Scarlemagne" Oak (voiced by Dan Stevens) – A deranged, flamboyant, power-hungry mandrill and Kipo's adoptive older brother. He seeks to create a mute-only utopia and rule Las Vistas with an army of enslaved humans. Due to human experimentation, the pheromones in his sweat can control primate minds.
- Song Oak (voiced by Jee Young Han) – Kipo's mother and Lio's wife who originally worked with him to revert mutes back into normal animals before they changed their minds; thought to be deceased, she is later revealed to be alive.
- Dr. Emilia (voiced by Amy Landecker) – A cold-hearted, manipulative, remorseless, and arrogant human scientist who wants to end the mutes' existence.

=== Supporting ===
Mod Frogs

- Jamack (voiced by Jake Green) – A Mod Frog and enemy of Kipo after she caused him to be banished from his pack, but later becomes an ally.
- Mrs. Sartori (voiced by Grey Griffin) – Leader of the Mod Frogs.
- Harris and Kwat (voiced by Ian Harding and Grey Griffin) – A pair of Mod Frogs and Jamack's former goons.

Timbercats

- Yumyan Hammerpaw (voiced by Steve Blum) – Axe Lord of the Timbercats. His name is a parody of the tall tale character Paul Bunyan.
- Molly Yarnchopper (voiced by Lea Delaria) – A Timbercat and Yumyan Hammerpaw's second-in-command.
- Ruffles (voiced by Matt Lowe) – A Timbercat.

Newton Wolves

- Good Billions (voiced by John Hodgman - Astronomer, co-leader of the Newton Wolves.
- Bad Billions (voiced by GZA/Guy Lockard) – Astronomer, co-leader of the Newton Wolves.

Umlaut Snakes

- Cotton (voiced by Grey Griffin) – Rocker leader of the Umlaut Snakes from Cactus Town.
- Camille (voiced by Joan Jett and Grey Griffin) – An Umlaut Snake.

Humming Bombers

- Easy (voiced by Matt Lowe) – Leader of the Humming Bombers.
- Boom-Boom (voiced by Alanna Ubach) – A Humming Bomber.

Scooter Skunks

- Loretta (voiced by Grey Griffin) - Co-leader of the Scooter Skunks.
- Wheels (voiced by Alanna Ubach) – Co-leader of the Scooter Skunks.

Fitness Racoons

- Label (voiced by Betsy Sodaro) – A Fitness Raccoon.
- Tongue Depressor (voiced by David Neher) – A Fitness Raccoon.

Other Mutes

- Amy and Brad (voiced by Avrielle Corti and Ace Gibson) – A pair of rats who manage an amusement park called Ratland.
- Ida, Florabel, and Bev (voiced by Kay Bess, Chris Anthony Lansdowne, and Mindy Sterling) – The "Chevre Sisters", a trio of blind, soothsaying goats.
- Margot (voiced by Faith Graham and Victoria Grace) – Wolf's adoptive wolf sister.
- Puck (voiced by John Lavelle) – A theater musician otter.
- Hyun-soo (voiced by Raymond J. Lee) – Lead singer of a narwhal K-pop band.
- Gerard (voiced by Dee Bradley Baker) – An orangutan Noble.
- Lemieux (voiced by Grey Griffin) – A tarsier Noble.
- Tad Mulholland (voiced by Michael-Leon Wooley) – A sentient colony of tardigrades who traps others in dream worlds.
- Fun Gus (voiced by Jack Stanton) – A sentient mold with a child-like personality.

Humans

- Doag (voiced by Rebecca Husain) – Hoag's dance-obsessed daughter.
- Hoag (voiced by Jeff Bennett) – A member of Kipo's underground community and Doag's father.
- Troy Sandoval (voiced by Giullian Yao Gioiello) – A boy from Kipo's underground community and Benson's boyfriend.
- Roberto Sandoval (voiced by Antonio Alvarez) – Troy's father.
- Asher and Dahlia Berdacs (voiced by River Butcher and Fryda Wolff) – Twin siblings from Kipo's underground community. Asher is non-binary while Dahlia is female.
- Lily and Earl Berdacs (voiced by Kay Bess and Carlos Alazraqui) – Asher and Dahlia's parents.
- Mr. Filburn (voiced by Jake Green) – A member of Kipo's underground community.
- Zane and Greta (voiced by Carlos Alazraqui and Anna Vocino) – Dr. Emilia's assistants.

== Production ==
=== Development ===
Kipo and the Age of Wonderbeasts was created by Radford Sechrist, previously a storyboard artist for Dan Vs. and later director on the Voltron: Legendary Defender. After quitting his job as an animator, Sechrist began posting the webcomic Kipo on Tumblr in 2015. The animated series based on the webcomic was first announced at the Annecy International Animated Film Festival in June 2019. Sechrist compared the series to The Wizard of Oz, "but instead of ruby slippers [Kipo] has Converse on".

The series has five writers in addition to showrunner Sechrist and executive producer Bill Wolkoff. They worked in two teams, each comprising a director and three board artists. The animation is made by Studio Mir in South Korea using traditional animation methods. About sixty people worked on the series at DreamWorks, and about fifty-five at Studio Mir.

=== LGBTQ representation ===
As Netflix pushed forward, Kipo and the Age of Wonderbeasts became a notable example of expanded representation. In the first season of Kipo, which streamed on January 10, Benson said outright he was gay, saying he only liked the series protagonist, Kipo, in a platonic way. He also developed a crush on a male character, Troy, in the show's 10th episode. Due to these elements, some noted the show's "casual queerness."

The series was nominated for a GLAAD Media Award for Outstanding Kids & Family Programming.

In August 2021, Sechrist told Insider that he and Wolkoff realized that there weren't "iconic Superman or Spider-Man archetypes very often as a gay person in media" saying that gay people would be villains or comic relief, with their pitch for Benson as part of the show, making history, becoming the first Black gay protagonist and "second-known animated kids character" apart from a character in 6teen to "identify themselves as gay in dialogue."

=== Music ===
The soundtrack to the series, including several original songs, was composed by Daniel Rojas. Rojas was tasked with writing original songs as well as creating a score that could "blend seamlessly" together. He collaborated with the screenwriters, producers, and music supervisors for the original songs. Though the score is primarily pop-oriented, Rojas would often tap into different genres and blend elements of them together. Genres included are hip-hop, trap, folk, electronic dance, rock, and classical. Soundtrack albums for each of the three seasons in the series were released digitally by Back Lot Music on January 13, 2020, May 29, 2020, and October 16, 2020.

=== Release ===
The show's three seasons, each ten episodes long, were released in 2020. Season 1 was released on January 14, season 2 on June 12, and season 3 on October 12. The show made its linear debut on Pop in the United Kingdom on October 3, 2022. The series was removed from Netflix on June 26, 2026, although it was a Netflix Original, after the agreement between Dreamworks Animation Television and Netflix, to keep it on the streaming platform, expired.

== Episodes ==
=== Series overview ===
Season	Episodes	Originally released
1	10	January 14, 2020
2	10	June 12, 2020
3	10	October 12, 2020

=== Season 1 (2020) ===
No. overall	No. in season	Title	Directed by	Written by	Storyboard by	Original release date
1	1	"Burrow Girl"	Radford Sechrist	Bill Wolkoff	James P. Gibson, Radford Sechrist, and Young Ki Yoon	January 14, 2020
In a post-apocalyptic city known as Las Vistas, two hundred years into the future after mutant animals overran the surface, and humans moved into living in underground civilizations known as burrows, Kipo, a 12-year-old girl, washes up into a reservoir after being separated from her father. As she explores her surroundings, she meets a six-legged mutant pig she names Mandu, as well as a young hardened human survivor named Wolf; she begrudgingly agrees to help Kipo return to her burrow, but as they chart the course, they are targeted by the Mod Frogs. Kipo provokes the Mod Frogs into chasing her, and is rescued by Wolf, who knocks out the frogs' comrade Jamack before she and Kipo hide in an abandoned house. They discover a crying mute baby, and they try to calm it down to avoid being caught.
2	2	"Explosion Berries"	Radford Sechrist	Bill Wolkoff	James P. Gibson, Radford Sechrist, and Young Ki Yoon	January 14, 2020
A young man named Benson returns to the abandoned house after a supply run, finding the Mod Frogs looking for Kipo and Wolf. He fakes his death to scare the frogs away before introducing himself and his best friend, a mutant bug named Dave, who molts into different age-ranged versions of himself. They agree to help Kipo reach her burrow if Wolf trades her weapon, a staff with a Deathstalker stinger, but she refuses; the next morning, Benson and Dave take the Deathstalker from Wolf, and she vengefully pursues them with Kipo, but the Mod Frogs return and attempt to take Kipo to their leader. Wolf rescues her but leaves Benson and Dave to be caught. Worried for them, Kipo convinces Wolf to return for them, but they end up captured as well and taken to the Mod Frogs' territory. As an escape plan, Kipo smuggles the fur of a Megabunny with her to attract one, and with Mandu's help, they escape with Jamack on their tail. After Kipo tricks him into being taken by the Megabunny, she and her group arrive at the burrow, but find it destroyed; she discovers her community had gotten away and prepare to track them down before an army of axe-wielding cats appear.
3	3	"Real Cats Wear Plaid"	Chase Conley	Bill Wolkoff	Jacob V. Eaton, James P. Gibson, and Ben Li	January 14, 2020
In a flashback, Kipo's father Lio sends her into the river to get her away from the burrow when it was attacked by a mysterious mega mute; at the burrow's remains, Kipo, Wolf, Benson, Dave and Mandu encounter the axe-wielding Timbercats who are looking for the same mega mute, but Kipo's attempt to ally with them leads to the group's capture. She discovers that the Timbercats are lost without their leader, Yumyan Hammerpaw, to guide them, learning that he is stuck above the forest; though the group escape while the cats are distracted, Kipo sneaks back to search for Yumyan, finding he ran away from the mega mute when it attacked and is now too ashamed to face his comrades; Kipo convinces him to return and lead her group to the mega.
4	4	"Cäctustown"	Chris Copeland	Joanna Lewis & Kristine Songco	Bridget Underwood, Kalen Whitfield, and Zuke	January 14, 2020
With the Timbercats' help, Kipo and her friends reach Cäctustown, territory of the punk-rock loving Umlaüt Snakes; as the group separates from the cats' escalating turf war with the snakes, Kipo and Wolf argue over their ideal methods of finding the mega mute. As Wolf attempts to no avail to fight the snakes, Kipo earns their respect with a music performance. Led to the mega mute's lair, she and Wolf attempt to sneak past it, foiled when the Timbercats nosily charge at it. The mega, a six-armed monkey, awakens and attacks in a frenzied rage, but Kipo appeases it by playing a family song; her conversation uncovers that her community had escaped, but the monkey is frenzied once more by a collar that sprays a mysterious pink steam, and it flees. Wolf deduces the monkey's current state to be caused by one of the most treacherous mutes in Las Vistas, Scarlemagne, as Benson leads the group to a potential clue to find Kipo's community.
5	5	"The Astronomers in Turtlenecks"	Chris Copeland and Bridget Underwood	Christopher Amick & Ben Mekler	Max Lawson, Kalen Whitfield, and Zuke	January 14, 2020
Along their journey, Benson suggests using a telescope in an abandoned observatory to find the burrow people, but he also reveals it to be the territory of the astronomy-obsessed Newton Wolves; despite Wolf's hatred for wolves, she helps Kipo and the others blend in like a pack to earn the Newton Wolves' trust. During a feast, Kipo sneaks away to use the telescope, finding Jamack being held captive as the wolves' prey; she frees him after he reveals that the telescope is being used by Scarlemagne to search for humans. After the wolves' learn of Jamack's escape, Wolf lures them away to save the others, and they come to her aid. When the sky grows too dark for Wolf to see, Kipo gains a sudden and temporary advantage to help the group fight off the wolves. Before they destroy the telescope, Kipo discovers a message from her father on a nearby billboard.
6	6	"Ratland"	Chase Conley	Bill Wolkoff	Jacob V. Eaton, James P. Gibson, and Ben Li	January 14, 2020
Kipo and her friends arrive at the billboard containing her father's message (the number 3.262 - the digit of a parsec) as she attempts to uncover its meaning. After she reaches a dead end, the group learn that Kipo's birthday has come around, and Benson decides to take her somewhere to celebrate while Wolf, Dave and Mandu search for gifts; Benson escorts Kipo to a human-mute safe zone amusement park known as Ratland, run by rat siblings Amy and Brad. Meanwhile, in their search for gifts at an abandoned parts shop, Wolf finds Dave wearing a jacket Kipo took interest in at Cäctustown, but he accidentally rips it up. After Dave reveals the shop's name, Wolf discovers the remaining letters on the sign spelling "parsec", revealing it as another clue from Kipo's father, and finds a note from him leading to a backup burrow. At Ratland, Kipo begins catching feelings for Benson and later confesses, but he politely shuts her down, revealing he is gay; they are attacked by one of Scarlemagne's mind-controlled human nobles. Kipo's arm becomes covered in fur, increasing her physical strength as she and Benson escape, at which point the fur disappears. The two reunite with Wolf, Dave and Mandu, where Kipo gives Wolf a hairclip, while Wolf gives her the sleeve of the jacket, nervously keeping quiet about the note.
7	7	"Mulholland"	Chase Conley	Taylor Chapulín Orcí	Jacob V. Eaton, James P. Gibson, and Ben Li	January 14, 2020
Kipo continues trying to solve the meaning of her father's billboard message, but they end up thrown into dreams fabricated by Tad Mulholland, a community of tardigrades who plans to siphon their life force; Wolf dreams of living a survivalist life with Kipo; Benson and Dave dream of hosting a house party; Mandu dreams of a forest of cheese puffs, while Kipo dreams of reuniting with her late mother. Wolf, overshadowed by guilt for keeping the note secret, awakens from her dream and rescues the others, causing Mulholland to embark on a journey to rediscover himself. Later that night, Wolf reveals the map to an angered Kipo, tearfully confessing that she was afraid of being alone again when Kipo eventually returns home, which would lead to the group parting ways, and Kipo responds by comforting her.
8	8	"Twin Beaks"	Chris Copeland	Joanna Lewis & Kristine Songco	Adam Lucas, Bridget Underwood, and Kalen Whitfield	January 14, 2020
Kipo's group reaches the next clue from her father, a red lunchbox, accidentally losing it in a waste dump, the sanctuary to the Fitness Raccoons; as they search for it, Kipo tries to speak with Wolf, who remains reserved after the previous night's events, and convince her to join her at the burrow. Meanwhile, Jamack witnesses Scarlemagne put a bounty out on Kipo, promising to reward who captures her with high hierarchal status. However, the group discovers the raccoons are being scourged by giant mutant pigeon dubbed Beak-Beak, but refuse to try driving it away out of fear. Kipo and her friends hatch a plan to trick the raccoons into helping drive Beak-Beak away, and they succeed, as well as emboldening the raccoons to protect themselves. Kipo recovers the lunchbox, containing 3-D glasses that reveals the location of the backup burrow - under a valley where rambunctious Mega Dogs roam. Wolf agrees to join Kipo at the burrow, but discovers her fur-covered arm. Despite Kipo trying to convince her, a frightened Wolf flees. After Benson leaves to pursue her, Kipo and Dave are captured by Jamack.
9	9	"Mute-Eat-Mute World"	Chase Conley	Christopher Amick & Ben Mekler	Jacob V. Eaton, James P. Gibson, and Ben Li	January 14, 2020
Kipo and Dave end up captured by Jamack, who plans to turn them in to earn authoritative power alongside Scarlemagne, battling for her against other mute gangs with the same goal, including his former comrades. Meanwhile, Benson tries to track down Wolf, who recounts her childhood; she was adopted by a family of wolves, bonding with their youngest daughter. However, her adoptive parents trained her as prey for the pack to hunt, explaining her hatred for wolves. As the war for Kipo rages on, she and Jamack begin to bond, but as he still desires to gain power, Kipo flees from him with Dave. Wolf and Benson are surrounded by the other mute gangs, but as Kipo arrives to help them, a remorseful Jamack helps them escape and lets the group go free; a Dubstep Bee informs Scarlemagne of Jamack's treachery, and he uses the opportunity to track down the burrow.
10	10	"Beyond the Valley of the Dogs"	Kalvin Lee and Young Ki Yoon	Bill Wolkoff	Ben Li, Adam Lucas, and Bridget Underwood	January 14, 2020
Kipo and company call the Timbercats for help in passing through Mega Dog Valley to reach the burrow, but although Yumyan turns them down, he allows them to use his pet flea Pierre instead. After narrowly avoiding the dogs, Kipo finally arrives at the burrow and reunites with her father. Lio allows Kipo's friends sanctuary in the burrow, where Kipo reunites with her school friends Dahlia and Asher, while Benson develops a crush on a boy named Troy. However, Scarlemagne tracks the burrow and uses explosive nectar to stage an attack. Falling debris sends Kipo into a vision that causes her right arm to transform into a feline paw. Before Lio could explain the reason behind it, he lures Scarlemagne to him, revealing they know each other. Kipo uses her altered arm to fight off Scarlemagne's forces but fails to stop him from taking Lio and most of the burrow folk (save for Troy, Asher and Dahlia). Kipo steals a flamingo in an effort to go after them.

=== Season 2 (2020) ===
No. overall	No. in season	Title	Directed by	Written by	Storyboard by	Original release date
11	1	"Paw of the Jaguar"	Chase Conley	Joanna Lewis and Kristine Songco	Jacob V. Eaton, James P. Gibson, and Ben Li	June 12, 2020
While Kipo and Dave go after Scarlemagne, Wolf, Benson and Mandu take Troy, Dahlia and Asher to be protected by the Timbercats, where Benson and Troy plan a date together. Meanwhile, after freeing the Mega Monkey from its collar, Kipo storms Scarlemagne's palace and rescues her father, who explains that he and Kipo's mother altered her DNA with the genome of a Mega Jaguar, giving her the ability to transform into said creature; although Kipo is ecstatic of the revalation, Lio warns her that she may be forever lost in the transformation, advising her to see the Chevre Sisters. Lio gets recaptured to help his daughter escape, while Scarlemagne destroys Ratland to gather materials for his new kingdom and to remind rebellious mutes of the consequences of crossing him. Kipo returns to her friends, saddened and regretful of her power trip, but the others encourage her to move forward as they discover Ratland's destruction.
12	2	"The Goat Cheese Prophecy"	Bridget Underwood	Bill Wolkoff	Yasmin Khudari and Sean Song	June 12, 2020
Kipo and company begin their search for the Chevre Sisters, who may be the key to helping Kipo master her newfound abilities. The group is captured by a pair of mutant pigs and are taken to the Sisters, a trio a blind goats who use cheese to perform soothsaying rituals. They put Kipo into a sudden series of dangers to trigger her other jaguar attributes, including ears and a tail. With Kipo confused by her sudden state, the Chevre Sisters explain that her powers manifest under intense dangerous situations, teaching her a gesture to summon them at will. However, through a divination, the Sisters advise Kipo to find an anchor that will allow her to return to normal when she becomes a Mega Jaguar, and she decides to track down the burrow she was born in.
13	3	"The Ballad of Brunchington Beach"	Matt Ahrens	Christopher Amick & Ben Mekler	Steve Barr, Florent Lagrange, and Perin McLean	June 12, 2020
As Kipo and company begin their search for her birth burrow, they decide to follow Dave to a restaurant called Brunchington Beach to ask its head, Cappuccino, about the burrow. They come across a theatre troupe of otters named the TheaOtters. Their showrunner, Puck, reveals that Brunchington Beach is anti-human and disguise the group as their extra cast members, while Dave is captured and is sentenced to dish duty to pay off a bill he bailed from a long time ago, where he runs into Jamack. The show is a success, but Kipo accidentally blows their cover and Cappuccino has them fed to her pet; Jamack rescues them before Scarlemagne's lackeys Gerard and Lemieux offer an ultimatum for Scarlemagne's coronation as emperor. Kipo intervenes, using her powers to fight them off with help from her friends and Jamack. As the fight escalates, Kipo nearly loses control of herself as Gerard and Lemieux flee. Thankful for being saved by them, Cappuccino gives them a map to the burrow and offers the group a meal before they leave, while Jamack joins the TheaOtters.
14	4	"To Catch a Deathstalker"	Chase Conley	Taylor Chapulin Orci	James P. Gibson, Ben Li, and Sean Song	June 12, 2020
With Scarlemagne searching for them, Kipo and her friends decide to split up; while Benson, Dave and Mandu provide a distraction, Kipo and Wolf enter the territory of Deathstalkers, mutant scorpions that hunt their prey via their heartbeat. Kipo's stress cause them to be attacked by the Deathstalker Wolf attacked in the past. As they hide out in Wolf's old home, she tries teaching Kipo to control her stress, but she is too overwhelmed by the weight of her responsibilities. Wolf allows her to take a break, and the pick-me-up allows Kipo to remain calm and resume their trek. However, Wolf's worry for Kipo results in her being caught; Kipo arms herself with weapons to rescue her friend, and they escape and reunite with Benson, Dave and Mandu.
15	5	"Fun Gus Part One"	Bridget Underwood	Joanna Lewis & Kristine Songco	Michael Chang, Jacob V. Eaton, and Yasmin Khudari	June 12, 2020
Kipo's party reaches her birth burrow, now covered in an orange fungus. As they search for her parents' apartment, Dave is startled, believing the place is haunted. They eventually find the apartment, uncovering a hidden panel containing a journal titled "Project Kipo"; she reads the journal, revealing her parents' everyday life and experimentation with creating a half-mute human in the burrow leading up to Kipo's birth. Meanwhile, a masked woman and her allies chase after the Mega Monkey before Scarlemagne can claim it for himself. After Kipo's mother, Song, became pregnant with her, she had developed sudden side effects similar to Kipo, such as fur appearing on her arm and increased physical strength. Meanwhile, Dave continues to act paranoid, and Benson blows up at him, causing Dave to leave him alone. However, he and Mandu discover that the fungus is sentient, and it kidnaps them. The fungus steals the journal from Kipo, and she, Wolf and Benson are unnerved by the sound of childish laughing.
16	6	"Fun Gus Part Two"	Matt Ahrens	Leore Berris, Joanna Lewis & Kristine Songco	Ricardo Curtis, Florent Lagrange, Perin McLean, and Seema Virdi	June 12, 2020
Kipo, Wolf and Benson meet Fun Gus, the living fungus that has overtaken the burrow. Having spent most of his life lonely, Fun Gus is eager to play with them; as the group attempts to escape from Fun Gus, Kipo learns of the day that led to her mother's disappearance, discovering they were planning to take Scarlemagne (formerly known as Hugo) with them in the past to run from a bigger threat. Meanwhile, the masked woman, Dr. Emelia, attempts to reattach the collar to the Mega Monkey, but it escapes, eventually being cornered and mind-controlled by Scarlemagne. With Mulholland's help, Kipo and her friends escape, finding her anchor in a picture of her and her parents the day she was born, but after seeing a distinct clue, Kipo realizes the Mega Monkey is actually a transformed Song. Upon seeing the Mega Monkey being taken away by Scarlemagne, Kipo's anger triggers her transformation into the Mega Jaguar, and she follows after her mother.
17	7	"Benson and the Beast"	Michael Chang	Taylor Chapulin Orci	James P. Gibson, Ben Li, and Sean Song	June 12, 2020
As the Mega Jaguar, Kipo pursues Scarlemagne until Dr. Emelia and her forces attack her. Benson and the others arrive also as Benson uses the picture to return Kipo to normal. Emelia, revealed to be the threat Lio and Song were avoiding in the past, plans to use Kipo to capture Scarlemagne before disposing of her. At the base of operations for Emelia's human resistance, she reveals a sonic emitter and a cage for Scarlemagne, part of a plan to thwart his coronation, and joins Kipo in training to master her jaguar state but she remains nervous over losing control. The sonic emitter attracts a pair of alien-worshipping bats that intend to contact aliens with the emitter. Benson gets himself captured to inspire Kipo to overcome her nervousness and transform into the Mega Jaguar. After rescuing Benson, Kipo is tasked by Emelia to fight the Mega Monkey. Conflicted about fighting her mother, Kipo sneaks out to meet with Song and break her out, but ends up captured by Scarlemagne.
18	8	"Sympathy for the Mandrill"	Bridget Underwood	Christopher Amick & Ben Mekler	Michael Chang, Jacob V. Eaton, and Yasmin Khudari	June 12, 2020
Following her capture by Scarlemagne, Kipo reunites with her father as Scarlemagne demands she attend his coronation to use her reputation across the surface to bolster acceptance among the mute attendants. Confused at his grudge on Lio, Kipo learns of Scarlemagne's backstory as Hugo; back at Emelia's base, Wolf, Benson and Dave go after Kipo to break her out. Years ago in the birth burrow, Hugo was conceived as one of few remaining unmutated animals and was used to decipher a cure to revert the mutes to normal, monitored by Lio and Song. Hugo eventually gains intelligence and a personality, to the delight of the couple, and one fateful night, he is discovered by Dr. Emelia. As Emelia demands a sample from him, Hugo discovers his mind-controlling pheromones when he accidentally takes control of Emelia's colleague Zane; Emelia exploits the pheromones from forcing Hugo to sweat it out, and he waits for Lio to come for him after Song gives birth. However, the burrow is destroyed after Song becomes the Mega Monkey, forcing Hugo into the surface, where he joins a crew of gothic apes. He reunites with Lio, who introduces him to the infant Kipo, but Hugo is appalled that Lio never came back for him; embittered, he usurps the goth apes' leader and renames himself Scarlemagne. He has Lio taken away, and when Kipo talks with him, the others arrive to her aid.
19	9	"All That Glitters"	Matt Ahrens	Joanna Lewis & Kristine Songco	Florent Lagrange, Perin McLean, and Seema Virdi	June 12, 2020
Wolf, Benson and Dave break into Scarlemagne's palace to rescue Kipo, who fills them in on Dr. Emelia's true motives. While the others go back to sabotage Emelia's plans, Kipo decides to try and convince Scarlemagne to change his mind, in spite of Lio's doubts. She spends time with him playing piano and giving him a gift, and he is seemingly moved. Meanwhile, the others' plot to block the cave is thwarted when Emelia outsmarts them, plotting to use them to lure Kipo back; she knocks out Benson and Dave before defeating Wolf and trapping them, breaking Wolf's Deathstalker staff. Luckily, Mandu takes Emelia on herself and knocks her out with the Deathstalker stinger, freeing the others as they all leave to help Kipo. At the coronation, Kipo's hope that Scarlemagne will change begins to fade as he threatens to turn whoever doesn't follow him into gold trophies. A horrified Kipo convinces him to relent, and he decides to let the patrons choose to follow him if Kipo gilds her father; she refuses, and he decides to let the coronation proceed.
20	10	"Heroes on Fire"	Michael Chang	Bill Wolkoff	James P. Gibson, Ben Li, and Sean Song	June 12, 2020
After Scarlemagne is crowned emperor, he attempts to mind-control the humans into fighting each other, but Kipo reveals that she had altered his pheromone with Mulholland, rendering it useless. Angered, Scarlemagne attacks Kipo, and as her friends strike back against his forces, Benson's backpack, containing the family picture, is destroyed, preventing Kipo from transforming, while the humans escape into the sewers and are rallied by Dr. Emelia to join her, having acquired the Project Kipo journal to create the cure. The arena begins flooding with gold, and as Scarlemagne attempts to escape, his flamingo's wing gets coated in gold, crash-landing and getting knocked out. As the patrons get on high ground, but are unable to escape the rising gold, Kipo decides to transform to stop the gold from flooding by knocking down a tree to block the pipe. Despite Song's help, Kipo is unable to push it down until her jaguar form evolves, giving her enough strength to topple the tree and save the patrons. However, Kipo struggles to change back without her anchor, but through some uplifting words by Wolf, Kipo realizes her loved ones are the true anchor, and she returns to human form. After learning of Emelia's acquisition of the journal, Kipo resolves to stop her.

=== Season 3 (2020) ===
No. overall	No. in season	Title	Directed by	Written by	Storyboard by	Original release date
21	1	"Everything is Crabs"	Bridget Underwood	Bill Wolkoff	Jacob V. Eaton, James P. Gibson, and Yasmin Khudari	October 12, 2020
Several months after Scarlemagne's coronation, Kipo is on a seemingly futile search for Dr. Emelia; at Timbercat Village, she creates the Human-Mute Ultimate Friendship Alliance (HMUFA) to inspire harmony amongst humans and mutes. Learning from the TheaOtters that Jamack was kidnapped, Kipo and her friends investigate, learning that Camille, an Umlaüt Snake, and Boom-Boom, a HummingBomber, has also disappeared; with multiple tribes around Las Vistas pointing fingers, Kipo is at a standstill. However, when a trio of Mega Crabs attack the village, Kipo transforms to fight them off. As she and Song struggle to defeat the crabs, the cats and snakes work together to set a trap for the crabs, and they succeed. As they feast on the crabs' remains, Kipo realizes what had driven the crabs to the village - a sonic emitter, revealing Emelia is out at sea.
22	2	"Code Word Milkshake"	Matt Ahrens	Leore Berris	Florent Lagrange, Perin McLean, and Seema Virdi	October 12, 2020
Discovering the location of Dr. Emilia and her human entourage, Kipo leads a stealth mission to free the captured mutes from Emelia and sabotage her path to the cure, while Dave is forced to stay behind. Kipo, Wolf, Benson and Troy struggle to control their frustrations toward Emelia, inventing a code word to help them remain focused. Meanwhile, a lonely Dave decides to have a boys' night out with Lio; Kipo and her allies reach Emelia's boat, and during their infiltration, are discovered by Doag, a girl from Kipo's burrow community, who is doubtful of Emelia's scheme until the group breaks into the doctor's lab, freeing Jamack, Camille, Boom-Boom and a mute narwhal named Hyun-Soo, whom Doag bonds with. After Boom-Boom blows up the lab, Doag escapes with the hostages, and Kipo destroys the boat's sonic emitter before trying to convince her people of Emelia's treacherous motives; Emelia's manipulation causes her attempt to fail, and she and the others flee. In the aftermath, Emelia picks up the journal, destroyed in the explosion, and figures out the key to the cure: Kipo herself, recovering a patch of her jaguar fur in the process.
23	3	"A Wolf in Wolf's Clothing"	Michael Chang	Christopher Amick & Ben Mekler	Jacob V. Eaton, Ben Li, and Sean Song	October 12, 2020
To inspire others to join HMUFA, Kipo tasks herself with a difficult objective - convincing Scarlemagne to apologize for his past actions. Meanwhile, Margot, Wolf's former adoptive sister from the wolf pack she was raised from, comes to ask Wolf for help in rescuing her brother from Dr. Emelia; she reluctantly agrees, and while Benson and Dave accompany them, Kipo tries to reform Scarlemagne, and despite some snags, he begins to change for the better and genuinely apologizes to the mutes, but though they remain wary of him, they decide to join HMUFA; Wolf and her group cross Mega Dog Valley to arrive at the Deathstalker territory, where Margot confesses that Emelia had bargained her to bring them to her in exchange for her and her brother's freedom, and while Margot escapes, the others are cornered by Emelia's forces.
24	4	"Don't You Forget a Meow Me"	Bridget Underwood	Taylor Chapulin Orci	Jacob V. Eaton, James P. Gibson, Yasmin Khudari, and Jam Respicio	October 12, 2020
Zane, Emelia's colleague, is captured by Asher, Dahlia and Yumyan to deliver a message to Kipo: her friends have been captured, and she must come to an abandoned factory to surrender herself to her. With Mulholland's help, Kipo discovers that not only Emelia has created two doses of the cure, but she also plans to use them on Kipo to strip her of her powers, threatening to kill Wolf, Benson and Dave if her plan goes awry. Kipo tries to figure out a way to avoid either outcome to no avail. Song, worried for her daughter, allies with Scarlemagne to decipher a way to communicate with Kipo in a different way; stuck and worried for her friends, Kipo considers letting Emelia cure her, but Song, through Scarlemagne, devises an idea for Kipo to use Emelia's pride against her, while Mulholland leaves for his own safety. Kipo arrives at the factory and is seemingly cured by Emelia, revealing it as a ruse to distract her so Lio can steal the second dose, and Yumyan attacks her colleague, Greta; Kipo frees her friends as Emelia and Greta escape, but discovers Yumyan had been struck by a cure dart. He resigns to his fate, sharing some parting words before he reverts to a normal cat. Meanwhile, Emelia frees Margot and her brother, showing off the cure to the burrow people before they advance to Timbercat Village.
25	5	"Song ReMix"	Matt Ahrens	Joanna Lewis & Kristine Songco	Joe Giampapa, Perin McLean, Seema Virdi, and Steve Walker	October 12, 2020
Returning to Timbercat Village, Kipo reveals Yumyan's curing to the members of HMUFA, and to reverse the effects, Lio plans to turn the cure into a vaccine to restore cured mutes to normal, but declares he needs Song's assistance. Lio uses the cure to restore Song to normal, allowing her to finally reunite with her daughter and husband. Realizing that Emelia has perfected the cure, she proceeds to help create the vaccine. However, she fails to figure it out, and as a precautionary measure, decides to put up a wall of death ivy to deter Emelia's army, who is rapidly approaching. Joining Kipo, Wolf and Lio to recruit the Dubstep Bees to help with the death ivy wall, Song attempts and fails to impress her daughter. Meanwhile, Benson and Dave accidentally lose track of Yumyan and search for him. Kipo's group arrive to recruit the Dubstep Bees, but Kipo inadverdently insults their queen, and her sting sends Kipo into an uncontrolled dance fever that her parents and friend must free her from. Back at Timbercat Village, Yumyan turns up from the kitchen, revealing he never left. Meanwhile, the group's attempts to impress the Dubstep Bee queen with a dance fails, and Song manages to convince the queen to free Kipo and set up the death ivy wall, hoping that it will turn Emelia away from the village.
26	6	"It's a Trap"	Michael Chang	Leore Berris	Jacob V. Eaton, Ben Li, and Sean Song	October 12, 2020
Kipo and friends stop by the Chevre Sisters' refuge to escort them to Timbercat Village for their safety. Before leaving, the sisters perform a divination that depicts Kipo having to fight against her people in the impending attack by Dr. Emelia's forces. They return to Timbercat Village, where the death ivy wall had been completed, and as Emelia's army arrive, Kipo warns them of the death ivy, and the humans begin digging their way through. Inspired by Zane bonding with one of the Fitness Raccoons, Kipo plans to set a series of elaborate traps to peacefully stop the conflict. Once the humans breach the wall, the traps begin to work, but Greta's strength causes the plan to go awry, and multiple mutes are cured in the process. An enraged Kipo transforms to drive the army away, and when she is hit by a cure dart, she is discovered to be immune. After Emelia's army retreat, Kipo regrets not accepting the divination and is determined not to make the same mistake again.
27	7	"Requiem for a Dave"	Bridget Underwood	Christopher Amick & Ben Mekler	Jacob V. Eaton, Yasmin Khudari, and James Lien	October 12, 2020
In the aftermath of the previous episode's events, Lio and Song return to the village, discovering the cured mutes. They proclaim to get started with the vaccine, but Kipo, anguished over the further damage Emelia could cause in the meantime, leaves to sink the boat in retaliation. In an attempt to stop her, Dave tells a story of how he developed a bitter feud with a man and his army of "fanatics" over a small cooling fan 200 years ago. In the years that passed, Dave and his fellow kind waged war with the man's ancestors over the fan, and after Dave's brethren were wiped out, he wages war with the last fanatic. a little boy revealed to be a young Benson. After being caught in a trap, the two put their rivalry aside and became friends. Kipo, moved by the story, confronts Emelia's forces on the boat and makes an unexpected proposal to "PRAHM."
28	8	"Hidden Treasures"	Matt Ahrens	Taylor Chapulin Orci	Perin McLean, Seema Virdi, and Steve Walker	October 12, 2020
Kipo makes a surprising final move to create unity among humans and mutes by throwing a party she dubs "PRAHM" (Party Reconciling All Humans and Mutes). After most of the humans join, Kipo's friends remain suspicious when Emelia decides to attend as well. Digging out a platform, she plans to create a float for her friends and family to "Prahm-pose" to the mutes as an apology. However, when they plan to rehearse their dance, the float meticulously disappears, and as Kipo, Wolf and Scarlemagne track it down, they discover it stuffed into a tree by a pair of hyperactive, absentminded Treasure Squirrels; meanwhile, Lio helps Benson overcome his anxiety about asking Troy to the dance. With the squirrels' help, Kipo digs out the float as the group proceed across Las Vistas for their Prahm-posal, and while some of the mutes arrive, and Benson finally asks Troy to the dance, Wolf and Scarlemagne sneak away to strike down Emelia themselves.
29	9	"Prahmises"	Michael Chang	Joanna Lewis & Kristine Songco	Jacob V. Eaton, Ben Li, and Sean Song	October 12, 2020
Learning of Wolf and Scarlemagne's vendetta, Kipo is upset for them leaving. However, Song reveals a secret Emelia told her a long time ago, where, after becoming the research leader back at the old burrow, she and her brother Liam searched the surface for samples. Upon seeing Liam return from meeting Brad and Amy, and he expresses his newfound thoughts about mutes on the surface, Emelia kills him to prevent him from ruining her hard work, lying to everyone that he was killed in a mute attack. Despite this, Kipo remains hopeful she can change. Meanwhile, Emelia lures in a Mega Walrus to steal its DNA for a secret final plan. Wolf and Scarlemagne track down Greta, who nearly overpowers them both before she is knocked out by Wolf. During an interrogation, Greta makes Wolf realize their mistake in leaving Kipo's side, and they let her go before heading to the ruins of Scarlemagne's palace to dress up for PRAHM. More and more human and mute attendees arrive, and more friendships blossom as Wolf, who shed her wolf cloak, and Scarlemagne arrive on time. A heartfelt apology from Scarlemagne finally inspires harmony among humans and mutes, declaring PRAHM a success. However, before they set off some fireworks, Hoag, Doag's father, reveals he and Greta had sabotaged the fireworks to shower the entire party in cure-infused embers. Just as he confesses, Emelia appears and sets the fireworks off.
30	10	"Age of the Wonderbeasts"	Bridget Underwood	Bill Wolkoff	Jacob V. Eaton, Yasmin Khudari, and James Lien	October 12, 2020
After Dr. Emelia sets off the sabotaged fireworks, Kipo and the other humans protect the mutes from the embers; refusing to accept defeat, Emelia injects herself with altered Mega Walrus DNA, transforming herself into a mega mute to battle Kipo at equal footing. Kipo transforms herself as she and Emelia engage in a decisive fight, but begins to get outmatched by Emelia's brute strength, despite the others' help. However, in her mindscape, Emelia's consciousness begins to slowly sink down. While Wolf intercepts Greta to acquire a cure dart, Kipo is subdued by Emelia, and when she prepares to attack the patrons, Kipo takes the final blow to her stamina to protect them. With Kipo unconscious, Emelia attempts to finish her off, but Scarlemagne sacrifices himself to save her, distracting Emelia long enough for her consciousness to sink deep into her mind, causing her to lose herself in her transformed state. As Lio and Song leave to find Scarlemagne, Kipo and her friends find Emelia, and, refusing to leave her stuck, uses the cure dart to revert her to normal. Kipo convinces Emelia to join the new era of peace, but the latter fakes it to attack her; Mandu rescues Kipo, sending Emelia falling into her old burrow and stuck with Fun Gus. Kipo and her friends find a wounded Scarlemagne, who thanks a tearful Kipo for helping him and has her to refer to him as Hugo before dying. Five years later, in a new-and-improved Las Vistas, an 18-year-old Kipo visits Hugo's grave and wishes him a happy birthday before joining her friends in spending the day together.

== Mixtapes ==
Kipo and the Age of Wonderbeasts (Season 1 Mixtape)
No.	Title	Writer(s)	Performed by	Length
1.	"Age of Wonderbeasts"	Vanessa Ruby Sandberg	VenessaMichaels	0:28
2.	"Grrrl Like"	Cathrine Saint Jude, Peter John Bezuidenhout	Dope Saint Jude	2:53
3.	"Yumyan Hammerpaw"	Allen Kozak, Bill Wolkoff, Dov Rosenblatt, Duvid Swirsky	Lea DeLaria, Karen Fukahara, Justine Huxley, Matt Lowe	2:01
4.	"Don't Stop Now"	Daniel Rojas, Michelle Gonzalez Telford	Daniel Rojas, Michelle Gonzalez	2:07
5.	"Newton Wolves Rap"	Ben Mekler, Christopher Amik, Daniel Rojas, Mike Brown	GZA, John Hodgman	2:09
6.	"Purple Jaguar Eye"	Bill Wolkoff, Daniel Rojas, Michael Anthony Cionni	Sterling K. Brown	1:52
7.	"Fight The War"	Daniel Rojas, Kathryn Guerra, Stephen Lukach	Kittie Harloe	1:54
8.	"What We Have Is You"	Allen Kozak, Dov Rosenblatt, Duvid Swirsky, Joanna Lewis, Kristine Songco	Sterling K. Brown, Karen Fukahara	1:26
9.	"Scarlemagne's Waltz"	Daniel Rojas	Daniel Rojas	0:48
10.	"Wolf Chase"	Daniel Rojas	Daniel Rojas	1:16
11.	"Jamack Theme"	Daniel Rojas	Daniel Rojas	0:40
12.	"Timbercats"	Daniel Rojas	Daniel Rojas	0:42
13.	"Megabunny Attack"	Daniel Rojas	Daniel Rojas	1:09
14.	"We Will Find Them"	Daniel Rojas	Daniel Rojas	2:07
Total length:				21:39

Kipo and the Age of Wonderbeasts (Season 2 Mixtape)
No.	Title	Writer(s)	Performed by	Length
1.	"Heroes On Fire"	Daniel Rojas	Karen Fukahara, Sydney Mikayla	3:23
2.	"Down With Humans"	Daniel Rojas	John Lavelle	1:28
3.	"Play It In My Head"	Daniel Rojas	Dan Stevens	1:11
4.	"Chevre Sisters"	Daniel Rojas	Mindy Sterling, Kay Bess, Chris Anthony Lansdowne	1:44
5.	"Deathstalker Territory"	Daniel Rojas	Daniel Rojas	1:20
6.	"Humand In Capes"	Daniel Rojas	Daniel Rojas, Matthew Wang	2:15
7.	"Family Tale"	Daniel Rojas	Daniel Rojas	2:56
8.	"No Anchor"	Daniel Rojas	Daniel Rojas	1:20
9.	"King Hugo"	Daniel Rojas	Daniel Rojas	1:05
10.	"Heroes On Fire - Karaoke Version"	Daniel Rojas	Daniel Rojas	3:21
Total length:				20:07

Kipo and the Age of Wonderbeasts (Season 3 Mixtape)
No.	Title	Writer(s)	Performed by	Length
1.	"The Age of Wonderbeasts"	Vanessa Sandberg	Keeley Bumford, VenessaMichaels	2:24
2.	"Ocean of Love"	Daniel Rojas, Eun-Jae Kim, Leore Berris, Matthew Wang	Raymond J Lee	2:12
3.	"Drowning"	Daniel Rojas, Eun-Jae Kim, Leore Berris	Raymond J Lee	1:21
4.	"The Cure"	Bill Wolkoff, Daniel Rojas	Jake Green, John Lavelle	1:30
5.	"Cruel To The Beat"	Andra Gunter, Daniel Rojas	Andra Gunter	1:42
6.	"Yumyan HammerMeow"	Daniel Rojas	Daniel Rojas	1:35
7.	"Treetop Butterflies"	Daniel Rojas	Daniel Rojas	1:10
8.	"Family Hunt"	Daniel Rojas	Daniel Rojas	1:58
9.	"MegaWalrus Attack"	Daniel Rojas	Daniel Rojas	1:02
10.	"A World of Wonderbeasts"	Daniel Rojas	Daniel Rojas	1:09
11.	"Ferris Wheel"	Daniel Rojas	Daniel Rojas	1:54
12.	"Scooter Skunks"	Daniel Rojas	Daniel Rojas	0:53
13.	"Catch Me"	Daniel Rojas	Daniel Rojas	0:46
14.	"It's Really You"	Daniel Rojas	Daniel Rojas	0:59
15.	"Mullholland"	Daniel Rojas	Daniel Rojas	2:12
16.	"Your Majesty Bee"	Daniel Rojas	Daniel Rojas	0:51
17.	"The Brunch Bunch"	Daniel Rojas	Daniel Rojas	1:18
18.	"A Second Chance"	Daniel Rojas	Daniel Rojas	0:33
19.	"Just One More Time"	Daniel Rojas	Daniel Rojas	1:30
20.	"Goodbyes"	Daniel Rojas	Daniel Rojas	0:53
21.	"A Safe Zone"	Daniel Rojas	Daniel Rojas	1:07
22.	"Las Vistas"	Daniel Rojas	Daniel Rojas	1:53
Total length:				31:02

== Reception ==
=== Critical response ===
All three seasons of Kipo and the Age of Wonderbeasts have a 100% score on Rotten Tomatoes, with too few reviews for a consensus. At io9, Beth Elderkin described Kipo as a "must-watch", writing that it joined the likes of She-Ra and the Princesses of Power, Gravity Falls and Steven Universe as a series with a broad appeal to many age groups, and highlighting its music and art design. At Collider, Dave Trumbore noted Kipo's similarity to other recent female-led animated portal fantasy series such as Amphibia and The Owl House, and described it as a "classic in the making" that drew on cultural touchstones such as Fallout, The Warriors, The Island of Doctor Moreau, Planet of the Apes and Alice in Wonderland. NPR argued that the series is colorful and funny, with its diversity allowing it comment on sexuality, race, and class, combining the world-building in Avatar: The Last Airbender and the inclusivity, and heart, of a show like Steven Universe. Forbes said that Kipo, like the "fellow empath Steven Universe," attempts to talk antagonists about their feelings.

Writing for Polygon, Petrana Radulovic appreciated that beneath a standard fantasy exploration quest, the series is a "vibrant mosaic, with a unique world, multidimensional character relationships, and a deeper underlying plot" about the tensions between mutes and humans. She also noted that Benson was the first character to have an explicit coming out as gay in an all-ages animation series, and that the understated manner of the scene, in episode 6, made it all the more noteworthy. Charles Pulliam-Moore at io9 likewise wrote that the series's "casual queerness is fantastic" because Benson's orientation is not treated as a plot point to complicate Kipo's feelings for him, but, "with a distinct matter-of-factness", as just one aspect of his character. Dave Trumbore of Collider noted that the show explores "burgeoning same-sex relationships in a positive manner," referring to the relations between Benson and Troy. A review of the season by Shamus Kelley pointed out the continued flirting between Troy and Benson, with Benson trying to impress him, and his dad, praising that their relationship has had "zero drama...[and] zero subtext," treated as a "regular thing without any of the restrictions gay characters have had before." Kevin Johnson wrote about how in Kipo, "the surface world of earth is genuinely dangerous, and each character, still couched in their Blackness, represents different perspectives," exploring race like Steven Universe explored gender, and is willing to "explore the messiness of racial issue," believing that Kipo could become "a beacon through the thorny, fraught issues of race," just as Steven taught young viewers how to "let compassion and kindness guide them through encountering and dealing with gender concerns."

TV Guide called Kipo a "wildly imaginative story" with diverse characters. Petrana Radulovic of Polygon said that Kipo is like Steven Universe, the protagonist of the series of the same name, in that she wants peace, wanting everyone to "set aside their differences and talk through their problems" and called it a "celebration of differences." Shannon Miller of The A.V. Club said that it better to think of the series akin to a "lengthy film split into three hearty acts." Beth Elderkin of Gizmodo called the relationship between Benson and Troy "perfect." Shamus Kelley of Den of Geek praised the "charmingly cute romance" between Benson and Troy and said they were delighted both were still "together in the five-year time skip." GLAAD praised the series as being "LGBTQ-inclusive" and said that Benson's story "reflected the full diversity of the community."

=== Influence ===
In June 2020, Bill Wolkoff, co-screenwriter of Kipo and the Age of Wonderbeasts, said that they were lucky and glad the studio empowered this, wanting to have a "young, 16-ish year old kid" who was gay and was not ashamed of it. He also said he hoped for a season 3, but couldn't confirm it would happen. Adding to this, Shannon Miller wrote a review praising the show, specifically calling Benson the "joyful culmination of a long battle for intentional queer representation in Westernized youth animation," which has made progress from 2010 to 2020, while noting shows like Steven Universe, Adventure Time, and She-Ra and the Princesses of Power paved the way for Kipo. Miller further noted how ND Stevenson and Rebecca Sugar "faced immense challenges while dealing with merely the visual component of queerness."

In October 2020, The A.V. Club published an interview with Rad Sechrist and Bill Wolkoff of Kipo. In the interview, Wolkoff said that they did not face roadblocks in presenting Benson and Troy, crediting creators like ND Stevenson, Rebecca Sugar, and others for fighting "difficult battles before Kipo came along." He also noted how he fought for gay representation in the show, Once Upon A Time, saying they treated it "like a coming-of-age story," and said he is glad that the Season 1 episode "Ratland" meant a lot to young gay people, especially young Black people. Sechrist added that when they sold the show to DreamWorks, Peter Gal, then the head of development, stated that the character has to say "I'm gay" in an explicit way.

The same month, Fukuhara, who also voices Glimmer in She-Ra, said that it would be cool if She-Ra moved into "feature-length storytelling," with a movie focused on Bow and how he grew up with Glimmer. She also hinted that a crossover between She-Ra and Kipo could happen because although they are stories on different worlds, they could cross paths if the She-Ra crew came to Earth, helping Kipo defeat a "greater evil," leading them to band together and fight.

=== Accolades ===
Year	Award	Category	Nominee	Result	Ref.
2020	Autostraddle Gay Emmys	Outstanding Animated Series	Kipo and the Age of Wonderbeasts	Nominated	
2021	GLAAD Media Awards	Outstanding Kids & Family Programming	Kipo and the Age of Wonderbeasts	Nominated	
2021	Ursa Major Awards	Best Dramatic Series	Kipo and the Age of Wonderbeasts	Nominated	
2021	Daytime Emmy Awards	Outstanding Children's Animated Series	Kipo and the Age of Wonderbeasts	Nominated	
