= Adult animation in the United States =

Animation genre

In the United States, before the enforcement of the Hays Code, some cartoon shorts contained humor that was aimed at adult audience members rather than children. Following the introduction of the Motion Picture Association of America film rating system, independent animation producers attempted to establish an alternative to mainstream animation, as such led to the most successful work is Ralph Bakshi's Fritz the Cat.

Initially, few animation studios in the United States attempted to produce animation for adult audiences, but later examples of animation produced for adults would gain mainstream attention and success. Some of the most prominent animations with these mature/adult themes include Aqua Teen Hunger Force, BoJack Horseman, South Park, Family Guy, Moral Orel, American Dad!, Mission Hill, and Archer, along with other adult animated television series, feature films, and animation in other forms which helped the genre expand over the years, beyond animated sitcoms.

== Pre-Code animation ==
The earliest cartoon series were based upon popular comic strips, and were directed at family audiences. Most animation produced during the silent film era was not intended to be shown to any specific age group, but occasionally contained humor that was directed at adult audience members. Writer Michael Tisserand argued that all animations were "adult swims in the early days of American animation," with shapes which were hand-drawn, frolicking and not behaving "correctly" before audience members who "reacted with shock". Some scholars, like Jason Mittel, stated that the assumed audience of these early cartoons, particularly Looney Tunes, has alternated from their initial unspecific audience, to children, and back to general audiences. The earliest known instance of censorship in animation occurred when the censorship board of Pennsylvania requested that references to bootlegging be removed from Walt Disney's 1925 short Alice Solves a Puzzle. One of the earliest animated pornographic films was Eveready Harton in Buried Treasure, produced circa 1928, possibly produced for a private party in honor of Winsor McCay. According to Karl F. Cohen's 1998 book, Forbidden Animation: Censored Cartoons and Blacklisted Animators in America, rumor held that the film was developed in Cuba years after it was completed, because no lab in New York City would process the film.

The Motion Picture Association of America, then known as the Motion Pictures Producers and Distributors Association, was established in 1922 as the result of public objection to adult content in films, and a series of guidelines were established. Until the Hays Code was enforced, many animated shorts featured suggestive content, including sexual innuendo, references to alcohol and drug use, and mild profanity. In the 1920s and 1930s, X-rated cartoons were produced and shown, building upon the "small non-theatrical industry" which had developed "around pornographic films before WWI."

Yehudi the Chameleon, the star of Camouflage (1944)

The latter cartoons came at time when the U.S. military began to commission animated films to train recruits. This morphed into the U.S. Army's First Motion Picture Unit, which existed from 1942 to 1945, located at Hal Roach Studios in Culver City, California. The unit included filmmakers like Frank Capra, Looney Tunes creator Rudolf Ising, animator Frank Thomas, and cartoonist Dr. Seuss. It produced hundreds of animated "training films on a continuous schedule." Animation was integral in these films, helping pilots fly airplanes, soldiers learn the fine points of military camouflage, or train others how to correctly use hand-held weapons.

In addition, the Betty Boop series was known for its use of jokes that would eventually be considered taboo following the enforcement of the Hays Code, including the use of nudity. This included the short Bamboo Isle, which contains a sequence in which Betty dances the hula topless, wearing only a lei over her breasts and a grass skirt. According to animator Shamus Culhane, Fleischer Studios and Paramount Pictures were shocked by the sequence, but because it was a major sequence, it could not be cut out of the film. Culhane also states that he does not remember any instance in which the film was censored. Betty's hula animation was reused for a cameo appearance with Popeye the Sailor in his self-titled animated debut short of the same name. Following the enforcement of the Hays Code, Betty's clothing was redesigned, and all future shorts portrayed her with a longer dress which did not emphasize her physique and sexuality.

== After the Hays Code ==
By 1968, the Hays Office had been eliminated, and the former guidelines were replaced by the Motion Picture Association of America film rating system. The lifting of the Code meant that animated features from other countries could be distributed without censorship, and that censorship would not be required for American productions. Some underground cartoon features from the late 1960s were also aimed at an adult audience, such as Bambi Meets Godzilla (1968), and the anti-war films Escalation (1968), and Mickey Mouse in Vietnam (1969). Escalation in particular is interesting because it was made by Disney animator Ward Kimball, independently from the Disney Studios. Film producer John Magnuson completed an animated short based upon an audio recording of a comedy routine by Lenny Bruce titled Thank You Mask Man (1971), in which The Lone Ranger shocks the residents of the town he saves when he tells them that he wants to have sex with Tonto. The short was made by San Francisco-based company Imagination, Inc. and directed by Jeff Hale, a former member of the National Film Board of Canada. The film was scheduled to premiere on the opening night of Z, as a supplement preceding the main feature, but was not shown. According to a former staff member of the festival, Magnuson ran up the aisle and shouted, "They crucified Lenny when he was alive and now that he is dead they are screwing him again!" The festival's director told Magnuson that the producer of Z did not want any short shown that night. Rumors suggested that the wife of one of the festival's financiers hated Bruce, and threatened to withdraw her husband's money if the short was screened. Thank You Mask Man was later shown in art house screenings, and gained a following, but screenings did not perform well enough financially for Magnuson to profit from the film.

Aeon Flux, which aired from 1991 to 1995, was an American avant-garde science fiction animated television series that aired on MTV. Liana Satenstein called it "cutting edge, bizarrely sexy, and certainly not for daytime television," which has a cult-following, while Peter Chung, the director of the animated show, stated he was inspired by the "very naked images of the late Helmut Newton." Some argued that dramatic series such as Aeon Flux and Invasion America are less common, and still rarely successful.

Space Ghost: Coast to Coast ran on Cartoon Network from 1994 to 2001, then on Adult Swim from 2001 to 2004, and on GameTap from 2006 to 2008. The first two seasons of this adult animated parody talk show were presented as a serious talk show with subdued jokes, while the later seasons relied more on surrealism, non-sequitur, and tabloid. Reportedly the first original series fully produced by Cartoon Network, it had two spinoff series in the form of Cartoon Planet and The Brak Show, while inspiring series such as Sealab 2021; Aqua Teen Hunger Force; Harvey Birdman, Attorney at Law; Perfect Hair Forever; and The Eric Andre Show.

Many of the adult animated series on broadcast television have featured LGBTQ characters. Fox's The Simpsons has included gay characters, some of which were one-offs, an on-and-off-again gay couple, and lesbian characters. Additionally, gay characters appeared in Family Guy, King of the Hill Duncanville, have done the same. Additionally, bisexual characters appeared in Sit Down, Shut Up, which aired from April to November 2009, while gay characters headlined the short-lived show, Allen Gregory. The FOX adult animated sitcom, The Great North, which began airing in January 2021, included gay characters, as did the late 2006 series Freak Show, Brickleberry, which aired from 2012 to 2015, featured lesbian characters while South Park included gay and lesbian characters, as did Drawn Together.

Some depictions of LGBTQ people were criticized, like those in Family Guy and Bob's Burgers, as stereotypical, when it came to trans people In the case of Bob's Burgers, in June 2020, series creator Loren Bouchard committed to recasting a trans female sex worker character so she is voiced by a Black actor rather than a White male actor, currently David Herman. LGBTQ characters also headlined the series Rick & Steve: The Happiest Gay Couple in All the World, which aired on Logo TV from 2007 to 2009, including gay and lesbian couples as characters. and gay characters appeared in Chozen. Lesbian characters also appeared in The Goode Family,

=== Programming blocks ===
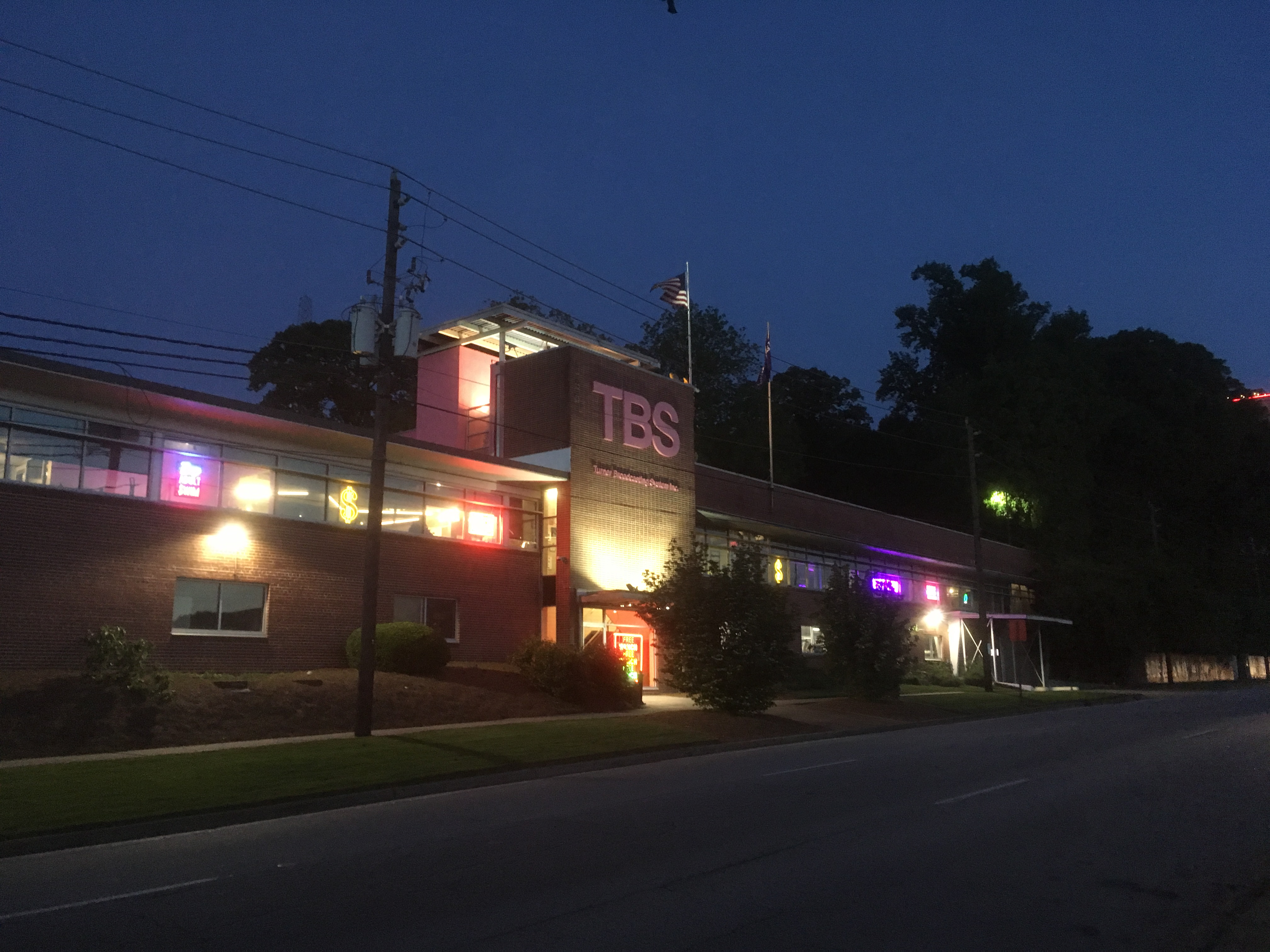
Adult Swim Headquarters on Williams Street in Atlanta, GA in late April 2019

There are various programming blocks for broadcast television which cater to adult animation. This includes Adult Swim, a programming block on Cartoon Network, which was founded in 2001, with a schedule which includes original programs such as Rick and Morty and The Venture Bros., as well as more "experimental" shows such as Aqua Teen Hunger Force and Squidbillies. Some said that the programming block was inspired by shows like Beavis and Butt-Head and Aeon Flux." Other animation blocs include FXX's Animation Domination High-Def, Syfy's TZGZ which includes various animated series and Fox's Animation Domination.

In the Adult Swim programming block, many of the animated series have featured LGBTQ characters. This includes gay characters in Space Ghost Coast to Coast, Mission Hill Braceface and Clone High. Also The Venture Bros. and Moral Orel featured lesbian and bisexual characters. In addition the series The Oblongs featured a trans character while Archer included gay, and bisexual characters. bro'Town included a protagonist who is fa'afafine, a Samoan concept for a third gender person, and Superjail! included a gay couple. The Boondocks featured gay characters, as did Rick and Morty. Rick and Morty also confirmed other characters as queer in the show's fifth season. In addition, Final Space, which aired on Adult Swim and HBO Max, included bisexual, genderless, and lesbian characters. Magical Girl Friendship Squad: Origins and Magical Girl Friendship Squad, on SYFY's TZGZ bloc, included queer characters.

== Streaming services ==
Some critics have argued that the streaming platforms are in a "war" with one another, during which adult animation is growing, as the genre changes, demand increases, and companies participate in production of these series. Companies such as Paramount Global, Hulu, Netflix, Apple TV+, Paramount+, Max, Disney+, and Crunchyroll have worked to expand their adult animation slates and offerings, There were even panels hosted on the topic, noting the companies producing adult animations. This competition has led some to argue that the adult animation field is in a "golden age" and that there is a post-pandemic boom.

In the 2020s, HBO Max, Hulu, Comedy Central, and Disney+, competed to grow the number of adult animations on their streaming services in order to grow their subscriber bases. This included the launch of a hub within the Disney+ streaming service, Star, for television and film content intended for an adult audience, the creation of a channel known as Comedy Central Animation for Pluto TV, ramping up "adult animation programming" on Paramount+, and HBO Max expanding their "adult animation slate" beyond South Park to gain exclusive streaming rights of various series.

In early July 2020, Hulu hosted the first ever Hilarious Animated Hulu Awards (HAHA) which is meant to celebrate "adult cartoons, characters, and moments" from those animations streaming on the streaming site. Viewers were allowed to vote on the winners, with awards for the Most Epic Battle Scene, Best Hangover Performance, Best New Show, Best Dance Performance, Best Talking Pet, Most Awkward Moment, Most Insulting Insult, Best Catchphrase, Breakout Star of the Year, and even Best Fart Performance. In later July, the HAHA winners were announced, with characters from Family Guy, Bob's Burgers, Futurama, American Dad!, Archer, Cake, and Solar Opposites winning awards.

== Cancellations ==
Many adult animations have been cancelled over the years, often when these series were either in development or before they received a second season. In 2017, Adult Swim cancelled a cartoon about Rick Moranis as a demon slayer titled The Gatekeeper, saying they were concerned about their "target audiences."

== Animated feature films ==
=== Ralph Bakshi ===
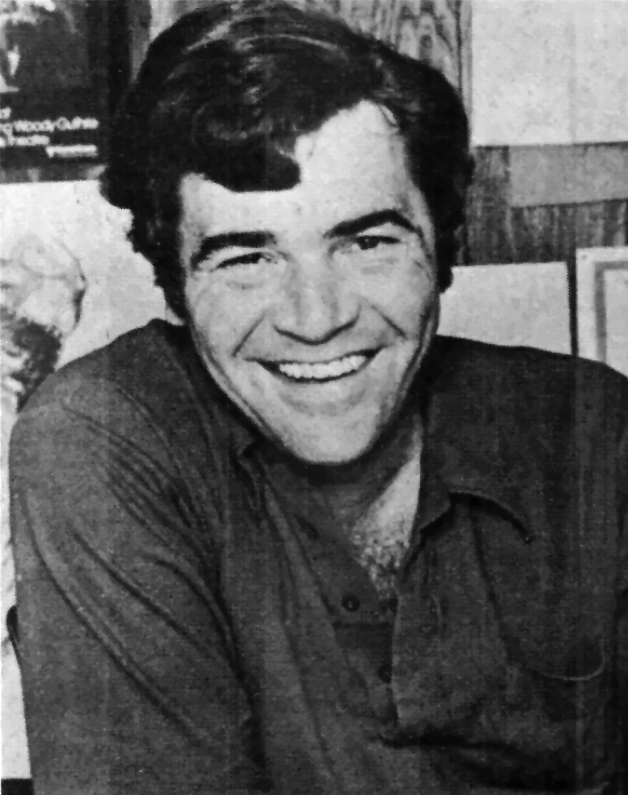
Ralph Bakshi (pictured in 1979) made his film debut as the director of Fritz the Cat (1972), which made his attempt to establish the animation as an alternative medium.

By the late-1960s, animator Ralph Bakshi felt that he could not continue to produce the same kind of animation as he had in the past. He said in 1971 that the idea of "grown men sitting in cubicles drawing butterflies floating over a field of flowers, while American planes are dropping bombs in Vietnam and kids are marching in the streets, is ludicrous." With producer Steve Krantz, Bakshi founded his own studio, Bakshi Productions, establishing the studio as an alternative to mainstream animation by producing animation his own way and accelerating the advancement of female and minority animators. He also paid his employees a higher salary than any other studio at that time. In 1969, Ralph's Spot was founded as a division of Bakshi Productions to produce commercials for Coca-Cola and Max, the 2000-Year-Old Mouse. However, Bakshi was uninterested in the kind of animation he was producing, and wanted to produce something personal, so he developed Heavy Traffic, a tale of inner-city street life. However, Krantz told Bakshi that studio executives would be unwilling to fund the film because of its content and Bakshi's lack of film experience. While browsing the East Side Book Store on St. Mark's Place, Bakshi came across a copy of Robert Crumb's Fritz the Cat. Impressed by Crumb's sharp satire, Bakshi purchased the book and suggested to Krantz that it would work as a film.

Fritz the Cat was the first animated film to receive an X rating from the MPAA, and the highest grossing independent animated film of all time. While the film is widely noted in its innovation, the film also offered commercial potential for alternative and independent animated films in the United States. Bakshi has been credited for playing an important role in establishing animation as a medium where any story can be told, rather than a medium for children. Because of the perception that Fritz the Cat was pornographic, Krantz attempted to appeal the film's rating, but the MPAA refused to hear the appeal. Praise from Rolling Stone and The New York Times, and the film's acceptance into the 1972 Cannes Film Festival cleared up previous misconceptions. Bakshi then simultaneously directed a number of animated films, starting with Heavy Traffic. Thanks to Heavy Traffic, Bakshi became the first person in the animation industry since Walt Disney to have two financially successful films released back-to-back. Although the film was critically praised, it was banned by the film censorship board in the province of Alberta, Canada when it was originally released.

Bakshi's next film, Coonskin was produced by Albert S. Ruddy. The film, culled from Bakshi's interest in African-American history in America, was an attack on racism and racist stereotypes. Bakshi hired several African-American animators to work on Coonskin and another feature, Hey Good Lookin', including Brenda Banks, the first African-American female animator. After the release was stalled by protests from the Congress of Racial Equality, which accused both the film and Bakshi himself of being racist, the film was given limited distribution, and soon disappeared from theaters. Bakshi avoided controversy by producing fantasy films, including Wizards, The Lord of the Rings and Fire and Ice. Bakshi did not produce another animated feature film after the 1992 release of Cool World.

=== Other animated features ===
Although some adult-oriented animated films achieved success, very few animation studios in the United States produced explicitly adult animation during the 1970s, and much of the adult-oriented animation produced in the 1980s and 1990s was critically and commercially unsuccessful. Krantz produced The Nine Lives of Fritz the Cat without Bakshi's involvement, and it was released in June 1974 to negative reviews. Charles Swenson developed Down and Dirty Duck as a project for Flo and Eddie (Howard Kaylan and Mark Volman, formerly of The Turtles and The Mothers of Invention) under the title Cheap! The film, produced by Roger Corman, was released on 13 June 1977 under the title Dirty Duck, and received negative reviews.

Animated films portraying serious stories began to regain notice from mainstream audiences in the beginning of the 21st century. Persepolis, a 2007 adaptation of Marjane Satrapi's autobiographical graphic novel, won the Jury Prize at the 2007 Cannes Film Festival, and was later nominated for an Academy Award for Best Animated Feature. In 2007, the then world-famous adult animated show The Simpsons generated a feature film produced by 20th Century Fox. Unlike previous films such as South Park: Bigger, Longer, & Uncut, The Simpsons Movie was rated PG-13 for 'some irreverent humor throughout'. The movie was received with positive reviews by critics as well as teens and adults and grossed $536.4 million at the box office.

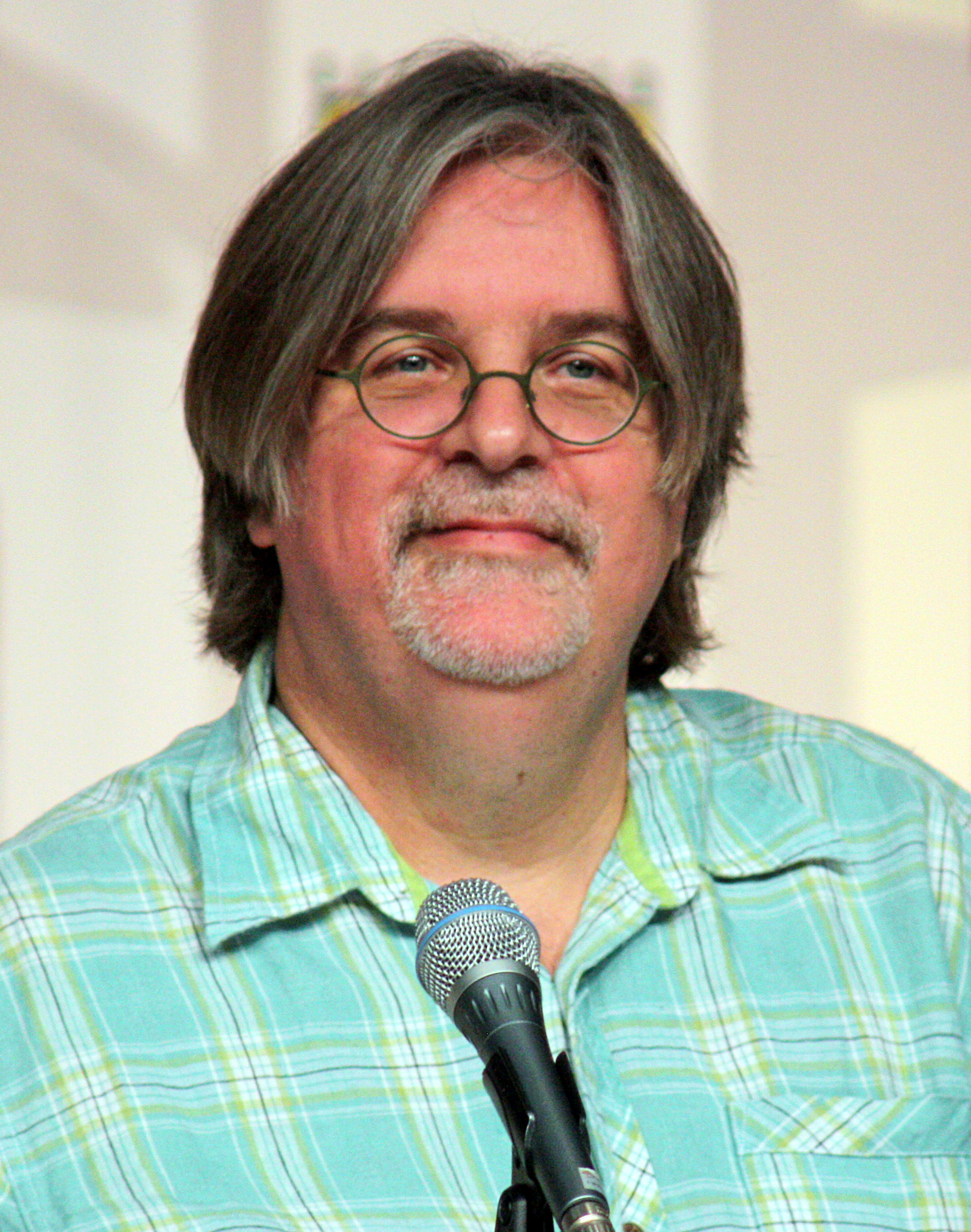
Matt Groening, who created Futurama and The Simpsons, at the 2009 Comic Con in San Diego.

Some years later, in December 2015, Anomalisa, an American stop-motion psychological comedy-drama film was released. It was later nominated for an Academy Award for Best Animated Feature, a Golden Globe Award for Best Animated Feature Film, and five Annie Awards. Some critics called it a meditation on "loneliness and mental disturbance" and reviewed it positively despite only getting less than $4 million at the box office in the U.S., saying it indicates how rare it is for "non-Hollywood animated features" to become a success in the U.S.

The 2016 film The Killing Joke was the first film in the DC Universe Animated Original Movies series, and the first animated Batman film to receive an R rating from the MPAA, with Warner Bros. Animation president Sam Register explaining, "From the start of production, we encouraged producer Bruce Timm and our team at Warner Bros. Animation to remain faithful to the original story—regardless of the eventual MPAA rating .... We felt it was our responsibility to present our core audience—the comics-loving community—with an animated film that authentically represented the tale they know all too well." The film was released in a limited theatrical screening on 25 July 2016. In 2019, Sony Pictures Animation announced the creation of an "Alternative Animation Initiative" dedicated to producing films aimed at more mature audiences. The adult animation film Cryptozoo by Dash Shaw was released at the 2021 Sundance Film Festival. Some reviewers described it as "gloriously colorful" and praised the animated film.

== Festivals ==
In 1988, San Francisco exhibitor Expanded Cinema screened a compilation of adult-oriented animated shorts under the title "Outrageous Animation". Advertising the package as containing "the wildest cartoons ever", the screenings contained shorts produced outside the United States, as well as independently produced American shorts. Reviews of the festival were mixed. San Francisco Chronicle writer Mick LaSalle hated almost everything screened at the festival, with the exception of Bill Plympton's One of Those Days. In The San Francisco Examiner, David Armstrong gave the show a three-star review and described the films screened as having "some of the rude vitality of the great old Warner Bros. cartoons —and a good deal of the sexual explicitness denied those old favorites from a more cautious age."

In 1990, Mellow Manor Productions began screening films under the title Spike and Mike's Sick and Twisted Festival of Animation. Founders Craig "Spike" Decker and Mike Gribble promoted their festival by handing out flyers on the streets rather than with traditional promotional techniques. In 1991, Decker and Gribble screened their first "All Sick and Twisted Festival of Animation", promising "wild and zany films that could never be shown to our 'normal audience'". The festival screened newer independent shorts, as well as older shorts such as Bambi Meets Godzilla, and Thank You Mask Man. Although the festival promoted works by animators who would later gain mainstream success, such as Bill Plympton, Mike Judge, Trey Parker and Don Hertzfeldt, many reviewers dismissed the bulk of the programming as shock value.

In 2003, Judge and Hertzfeldt created a new touring festival of animation marketed towards adults and college students. The Animation Show brought animated shorts into more North American theaters than any previous commercial festival.

== Young adult animation ==
For years, young adult animation, known as YA animation for short, has been discussed by executives and creators, especially those in the United States. In 2000, Tom Freston, the CEO of MTV, said that his network was at the cutting-edge of young adult animation. A few years later, a H2VEntertainment, a Montreal-based animation company, financed three animated features aimed "at the teen and young adult market" which would premiere in spring 2004.

Fast forward to the 2010s, when more critics and companies would begin talking about young adult animation. In 2015, one critic stated that the executives in the animation industry in the United States weren't on board with the idea of young adult animation, leading some to do Indiegogo projects instead. Others wrote about animation for young adults among anime in Japan, a theme which continued in later years.

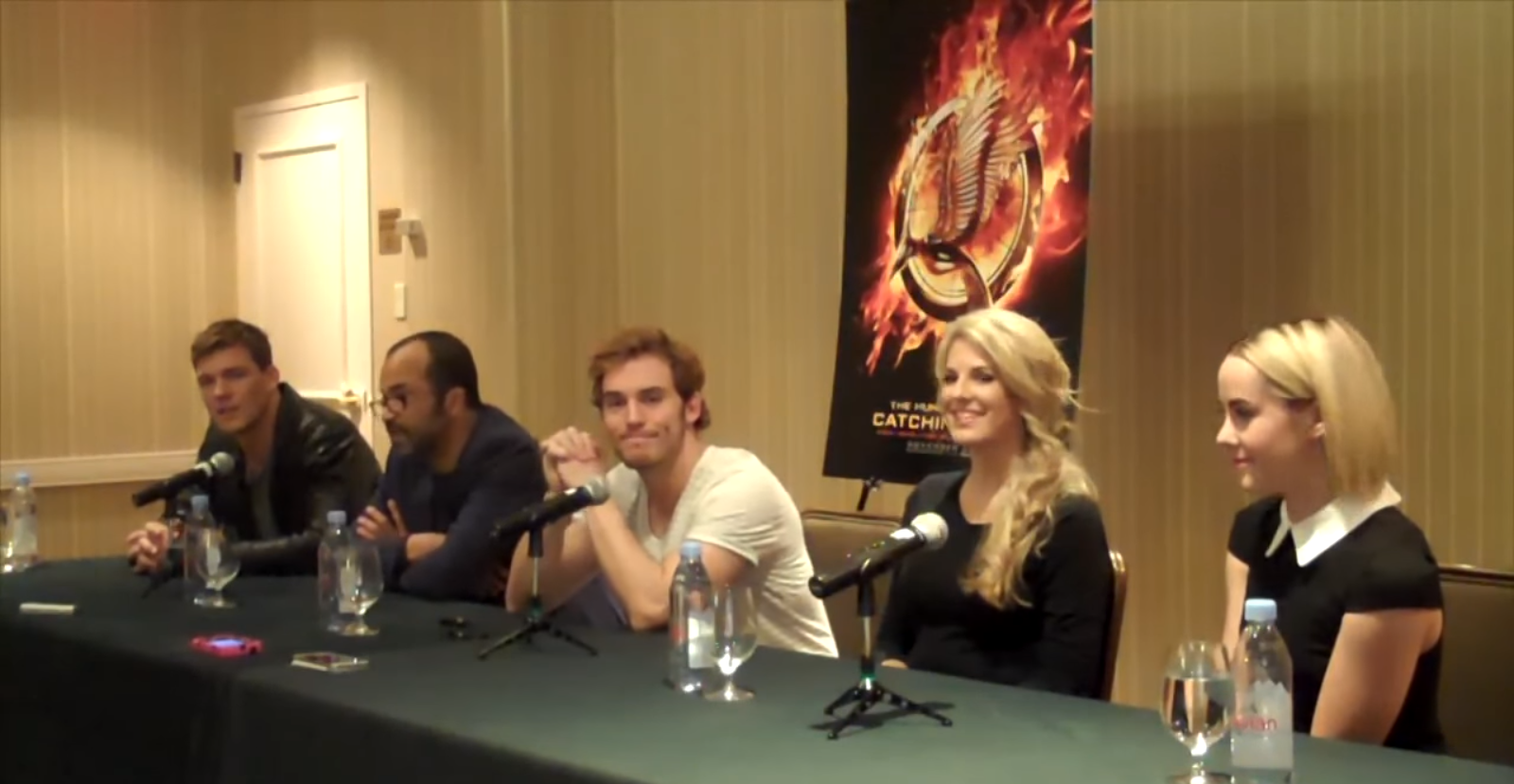
A small press conference for The Hunger Games: Catching Fire in November 2013, attended by fans, along with those on the panel (Alan Ritchson, Jeffrey Wright, Sam Claflin, Stephanie Leigh Schlund, and Jena Malone); The Hunger Games was cited as an example of YA fiction by Kipo's creator, Rad Sechrist.

In 2020, young adult animation came to the forefront once more. HBO Max was said to have a lot of material "oriented towards young adults" in contrast with Disney+. At the same time, some reviewers described The Dragon Prince as a young adult animation and the NATAS gave out various Emmys for young adult programs, like Tangled, differentiating them from children's animation and preschool animation. 2020 was the first year that NATAS gave a Daytime Emmy for young adult programs, which includes shows "targeting a tween and teen audience." Fans of Disney Channel's shows like Amphibia and The Owl House create a huge fandom due to the creators, Matt Braly and Dana Terrence stated those shows, "Targeted to young adults". On October 22, Radford "Rad" Sechrist, the series creator of Kipo and the Age of Wonderbeasts floated the idea of a streaming service creating "a dedicated YA animation division," stating that it would have shows like Kipo, along with a "dedicated YA team to target that audience."

In later October 2020, it was announced that WarnerMedia would be changing its "oversight of kids and family programming for HBO Max" from a group led by the latter to one led by Tom Ascheim, a person who formerly worked at Disney and became the president of Global Kids, Young Adults and Classics section at WarnerMedia in June. It was also stated that Casey Bloys of HBO would continue to "oversee young adult content and adult animation" for HBO Max, while Ascheim would focus on "kid-specific originals" with a priority to "develop preschool centric programming."

On December 8, 2020, Sechrist still expressed support for HBO Max creating "a section for YA animation." When the upcoming animated movie for a Diary of a Wimpy Kid was announced, the latter was described as a "young adult series." In January 2021, HBO Max debuted an animation page, which included adult animation, older cartoons, and "animation dedicated to teens and young adults."

In August 2021, Animation World Network and Deadline described the upcoming Adventure Time: Fionna and Cake series as a "young adult animated show." In October 2021, a reviewer for The Geekiary argued that High Guardian Spice was a young adult animation.

In 2022, Hugh Laurie and Emilia Clarke are set to lead the cast in an animated film titled The Amazing Maurice based on Terry Pratchett's 2001 novel, The Amazing Maurice and His Educated Rodents. It is said that this film is specifically targeted toward the young adult audience.

In July 2022, Hamish Steele, creator of Dead End: Paranormal Park, agreed with an interviewer from The Hollywood Reporter and called the series a young adult animation. He noted that even cartoon shows like Infinity Train had to pitch to a younger audience and declared that Dead End is "a YA kids' show."

== Series in development ==
In the 2020s, it was announced that Netflix, Comedy Central, Disney, and HBO Max were developing adult animated series. This included development of a Game of Thrones animated series by HBO Max, based on the live-action Game of Thrones TV series, along with eight other adult animated series: Scavengers Reign, Creature Commandos Noonan's, Fired on Mars, a revival of Clone High, Hello Paul by musician Sean Solomon, Obi by Michael B. Jordan's Outlier Society, Uncanny Valley by Brendan Walter and Greg Yagolnitzer, and Cover by Brian Michael Bendis and David Mack. In December 2020, it was reported that a new series by Disney/Pixar, Light Year will focus on Buzz Lightyear in Toy Story but have a "more adult sci-fi imprint". In 2020, it was noted that Netflix had series such as Blue Eye Samurai and Mulligan, among other original programming.

In 2020 and 2021, it was reported that Seth MacFarlane, Idris Elba and Sabrina Dhowre, and Dan Harmon were working on adult animations. It was also reported that a comic, Sweet Paprika by Mirka Andolfo, would be developed into an adult animation with DreamWorks Animation veteran Gabriele Pennacchioli, and production of new animated series by Jorge Gutiérrez and Mexopolis, his production company, including preschool animations, all-ages animations, and adult animations.

In addition, Amazon Studios was noted as producing an animated series titled Oaklandia, starring the rapper Snoop Dogg and actor Vince Vaughn, with producers including Daniel Dominguez who worked on Gen:Lock. Other articles noted that the creator of Star Trek: Lower Decks, Mike McMahan had inked a deal with CBS Studios to "produce all television content created and developed" by him going forward and that Hulu was developing an animated comedy series entitled Standing By. Additionally, it was said that Paramount+ began production of a Everybody Still Hates Chris animated reboot centering on Chris Rock, which would air on Paramount+ and Comedy Central.

== See also ==
- Animation in the United States during the silent era
- Animation in the United States in the television era
- Modern animation in the United States
- List of adult animated films
- List of adult animated television series
- List of adult animated internet series
