= Jake Parker =

Illustrator

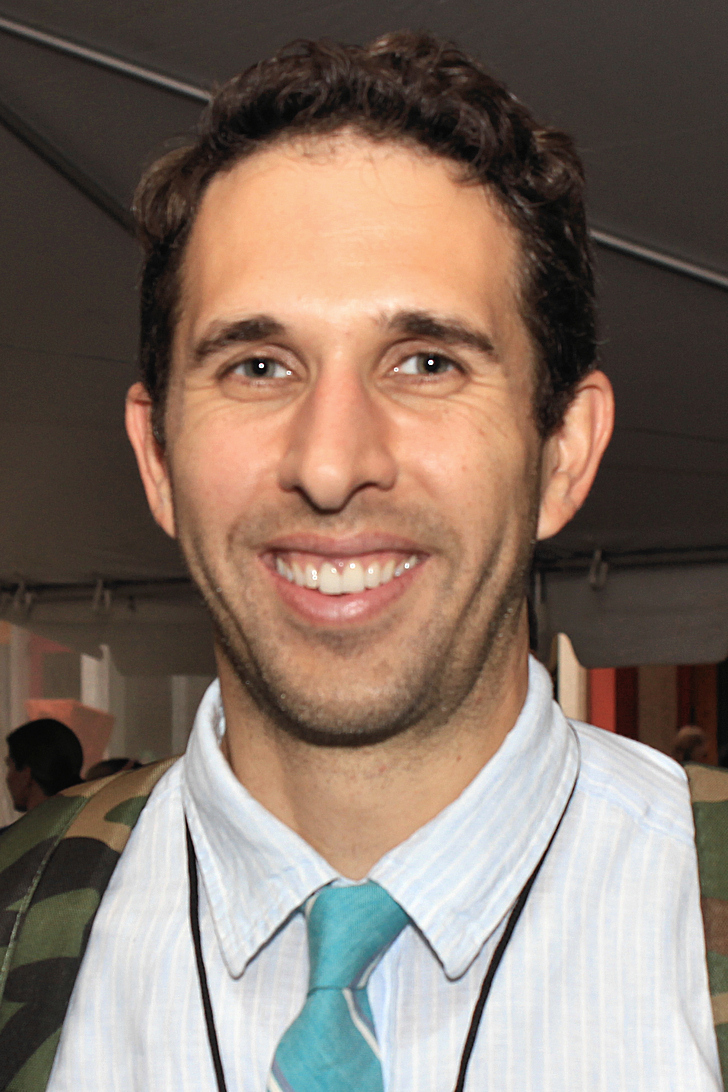
- Parker in 2016
- Occupations: Illustration, animator
- Known for: Inktober
- Notable work: Horton Hears a Who

Jake Parker is an American comics short-story creator, concept artist, illustrator, and animator. Parker worked as a set designer for Blue Sky Studios where he contributed to the animated films Horton Hears a Who, Rio and Epic. Parker is a children's book illustrator; his work includes the 2015 New York Times bestseller The Little Snowplow. In 2016, he wrote and illustrated his first children's book Little Bot and Sparrow which was inspired by his "Robot and Sparrow" comic. He is the creator of Inktober, a popular annual ink drawing celebration during October.

== Life and career ==
Jake Parker grew up in Mesa, Arizona. He developed an interest in drawing at a young age, influenced by cartoonists Bill Watterson, Jim Lee, and Mike Mignola. After dropping out of community college, Parker worked as an assistant to animators at Fox Animations Studios in Phoenix, Arizona and contributed to the movie Titan A.E.. After the animation studio closed, Parker worked in graphic design, museum exhibit design, and video game design. He moved to Connecticut to work as a set designer at Blue Sky Studios where he contributed to the animated films Horton Hears a Who, Rio and Epic. Parker moved with his wife and five children to Provo, Utah to teach illustration at Brigham Young University (BYU).

Parker is also the co-founder and contributor to the illustration education website, Society of Visual Storytelling, a series of live online classes which now offers subscriptions to recorded classes. He contributed stories for three of the volumes of Flight. His comic "Robot and the Sparrow" was influenced by Calvin and Hobbes. Parker has illustrated children's books such as the 2015 New York Times bestseller The Little Snowplow, The Tooth Fairy Wars, and The 12 Sleighs of Christmas. He wrote and illustrated his first book, a children's book called Little Bot and Sparrow based on his "Robot and Sparrow" comic.

Parker and his wife have five children and live in Richmond, Virginia. One of his sons, Tate Parker, also draws comics.

== Inktober ==
In 2009, Parker started Inktober, a popular annual celebration of ink drawing (only in fountain pen) during the month of October. The announcement was made on his blog. Inktober is a challenge to create one ink drawing every day for each day of October and post them on social media; Parker originally started the challenge to motivate himself to improve his own inking skills. Since about 2016, Parker has posted a list of "prompts" for each day's artwork. Artists are also known to plot out series of drawings on the same theme as part of the celebration. Participants have approached the challenge as an opportunity to practice and share their art, drawing in various art styles, and using a variety of media. In October 2015, over 1 million Inktober drawings were posted on Instagram.

Parker also started an "Art Drop Day", which occurs on the first Tuesday of September, to encourage artists to connect with others in a physical way.

Parker registered "Inktober" as a trademark in 2019, following which some participating artists received cease and desist notices for selling work created during the challenge. Parker later clarified that using the word "Inktober" was permitted in a subtitle, but use of the logo was not. Prior to his clarification, people took to Twitter to boycott Inktober, stating that it had become popular because of the artworks of smaller artists, who were now being penalised for selling the works inspired by it. Others also expressed a concern over providing free advertising for Inktober as a brand.

=== Plagiarism allegations ===
Just ahead of the expected 2020 release date of Parker's newest book, Inktober All Year Round: Your Indispensable Guide to Drawing With Ink, author Alphonso Dunn used his YouTube channel to provide a detailed comparison of his own work and parts of Parker's new book, alleging plagiarism by Parker.

== Published work ==
- Out of Picture 2: Art from the Outside Looking In Villard (June 3, 2008)
- Missile Mouse: Rescue on Tankium3 GRAPHIX (2011)
- Missile Mouse: The Star Crusher GRAPHIX (2010)
- The Astonishing Secret of Awesome Man Balzer + Bray (September 6, 2011)
- The Antler Boy and Other Stories Jake Parker Productions (2012)
- Apples A to Z Scholastic Press (August 1, 2012)
- Nuthin' But Mech Design Studio Press (August 15, 2012)
- The Girl Who Wouldn't Brush Her Hair Schwartz & Wade (September 10, 2013)
- Explorer: The Lost Islands Amulet Books (October 15, 2013)
- Nuthin' but Mech, Volume Two Design Studio Press (June 15, 2014)
- The Tooth Fairy Wars Atheneum Books for Young Readers (July 15, 2014)
- Rocket Raccoon Issues 5-6 and 9–11. 2014-2015
- The Little Snowplow Candlewick (October 13, 2015)
- Who's the Grossest of Them All? (2016)
- Little Bot and Sparrow (September 27, 2016)
- The 12 Sleighs of Christmas (October 2017)
- SkyHeart Book One: The Search for the Star Seed (2018)
- Goldilocks for Dinner: A Funny Book About Manners (July 2019)
- The Little Snowplow Wishes for Snow (October 2019)
- (Pre-Order) Inktober All Year Round: Your Indispensable Guide to Drawing With Ink

=== Flight ===
- "The Robot and the Sparrow." Flight, Volume Two Villard (April 10, 2007)
- "Hugo Earhart." Flight, Volume One Villard (April 10, 2007)
- "Missile Mouse: The Guardian Prophecy." Flight Explorer Villard (March 25, 2008)
- Flight, Volume Eight Villard (June 28, 2011)

=== Film work ===
- Titan A.E. – Fox Animation Studios (2000)
- Horton Hears a Who! – Blue Sky Studios (2008)
- Ice Age: Dawn of the Dinosaurs – Blue Sky Studios (2009)
- Rio – Blue Sky Studios (2011)
- Epic – Blue Sky Studios (2013)
