= Radford Sechrist =

American story artist (born 1990)

- Citizenship: United States
- Education: University of California, Santa Barbara (BS)
- Occupations: Animator; director; producer; storyboard artist; educator
- Years active: 2006–present
- Known for: Kipo and the Age of Wonderbeasts
- Spouse: Maggie Kang
- Children: 1

Radford Sechrist, also known as Rad Sechrist, is an American animator, director, producer, storyboard artist, and educator. He is best known as the creator, showrunner, and executive producer of the animated series Kipo and the Age of Wonderbeasts (2020) for DreamWorks Animation Television and Netflix.

== Early life and education ==
Sechrist attended the University of California, Santa Barbara, where he earned a Bachelor of Science degree in mechanical engineering. During college, he began drawing comics for fun, initially unaware that animation could be a viable career path. Sechrist would later say he had started drawing comics before he started animation and later continued "doing them on the side or at night."

In 2025, the third volume of Flight, a comics anthology, was reissued, for which Sechrist had drawn in June 2006.

== Career ==
=== Early career and feature animation ===
Sechrist who begin his professional animation career by working at DreamWorks Animation in 2006 as a storyboarder. He began as a story trainee on Bee Movie. He subsequently worked as a story artist and additional storyboard artist on numerous animated feature films. This started with serving as a story artist on Megamind in 2010. He would later be a story artist on Kung Fu Panda 2 in 2011 and additional story artist on Madagascar 3: Europe's Most Wanted in 2012 and on Turbo in 2013.

In 2014, he was a story artist on How to Train Your Dragon 2. The same year, he was a story artist on Penguins of Madagascar. He would come up with the idea for Kipo, beginning it as a webcomic, while working as a story artist on How to Train Your Dragon 2 and noted his inspiration from The Walking Dead and Game of Thrones.

In 2021, he served as Head of Story for the Sony Pictures Animation film Wish Dragon.

=== Kipo and the Age of Wonderbeasts ===
Sechrist created the animated series Kipo and the Age of Wonderbeasts, which premiered on Netflix in January 2020. The series originated from his webcomic Kipo, which he self-published online in 2015. Peter Gal, a DreamWorks Animation Television executive, noted that the company found the online comic while looking for original developments, "fell in love with it," responded to it on a "gut level" and then contacted Sechrist, who they learned worked at DreamWorks, then later pitched to Netflix as "part of its ongoing multi-year agreement". Sechrist developed the pitch of the series as "The Walking Dead, but everything that's trying to kill you is adorable," aiming to blend post-apocalyptic stakes with vibrant, optimistic storytelling. When the series was pitched, Sechrist, and Bill Wolkoff, the series executive producer, knew that the series would feature a gay character, with Sechrist saying the romance between Benson and Troy was the result of our the show's entire crew. Sechrist was also described by series composer Daniel Rojas as always listening to music while designing the characters, and world, even with "specific musical styles or artists in mind" when certain characters were designed, and reflected in how some characters present or dress.

As showrunner and executive producer, Sechrist oversaw all three seasons of the series, which concluded in October 2021. The show received widespread critical praise for its innovative animation style, diverse cast, complex worldbuilding, and themes of empathy and community. It was particularly noted for its positive LGBTQ+ representation, featuring an openly gay main character, Benson, which earned the series a GLAAD Media Award nomination in 2021. The series was also nominated for a Daytime Emmy Award for Outstanding Children's Animated Series. Sechrist later stated that Netflix was clear the series would only have 30 episodes and there was no opportunity for more episodes in a fourth season and she said that he would like to do a story of Wolf when she is age 15. He also expressed interest in possible films to continue the story.

=== Teaching and entrepreneurship ===
Parallel to his production work, Sechrist has maintained a career as an educator. He has taught storyboarding and animation at several institutions, including the California Institute of the Arts (CalArts), Academy of Art University, George Washington University, SCAD, and the Los Angeles Academy of Figurative Art While at CalArts he taught a class entitled Life Drawing for Animators which applied "life drawing techniques to animation."

In 2021, he co-founded Project City with animators Ethan Becker, Chase Conley, and Coran Kizer Stone. Described as an "animation incubator," the venture focuses on developing independent animated projects and providing educational resources for artists. He also ran online platform named Rad How-To School, offering instructional content on drawing and storyboarding. He would later present about Project City, with Ethan Becker and Chase Conley, at Anime Expo in June 2022.

=== Other work ===
Sechrist also ran a skateboard company named Plastic Walrus, where he met Andra Gunter, in 2014 or 2015, with Gunter working on Kipo as a music composer and vocal contributor, and known as Oz the Originator in the show.

In 2020, Sechrist said he was in "development at DreamWorks features" in a non-Kipo-related project.

Sechrist was a story artist for the film KPop Demon Hunters, in which he designed the character Derpy Tiger. Sechrist based the character's design 90% on minhwa and the rest on his cat named "Yumyan," which was named after a cat character from Kipo named Yumyan Hammerpaw, and he was said to have designed characters and written "a lot of the scenes" for the film. He talked about the film on social media, noting why he felt that the film had been such a hit compared to The Bad Guys 2 and Elio.

== Personal life ==
Sechrist is married to animation director and story artist Maggie Kang. He gave her the idea for merging Korean mythology and K-pop, which became the film K-Pop Demon Hunters. According to Kang, she and Sechrist thought up the concept for the animation film, which was bought by Sony, and began development, a week after it was pitched over lunch in 2018. Their daughter voiced the protagonist as a child, while Sechrist designed the character Derpy Tiger in the film, basing it upon minhwa and his cat Yumyan. Before this, in 2020, Sechrist stated that a standout part of the third season of Kipo were the K-pop narwhals, adding that since Kang would take him to BTS concerts, the genre was close to his heart.

Sechrist has autism and attention deficit hyperactivity disorder.

== Filmography ==
=== Feature films ===
Year	Title	Role	Notes	Ref
2007	Bee Movie	Storyboard Artist	First job in animation industry	
2010	Megamind	Story Artist		
2011	Kung Fu Panda 2	Story Artist		
2012	Madagascar 3: Europe's Most Wanted	Additional Story Artist		
2013	Turbo	Additional Story Artist		
2014	Mr. Peabody & Sherman	Additional Story Artist		
2014	How to Train Your Dragon 2	Story Artist		
2014	Penguins of Madagascar	Story Artist		
2017	The Lego Ninjago Movie	Additional Storyboard Artist		
2021	Wish Dragon	Head of Story		
2025	KPop Demon Hunters	Story Artist	Designed Derpy Tiger	

=== Television ===
Year	Title	Role	Notes	Ref
2012	Ultimate Spider-Man	Storyboard Artist	1 episode	
2016	Kung Fu Panda: Secrets of the Scroll	Storyboard Artist	Television special	
2020	Kipo and the Age of Wonderbeasts	Creator, Showrunner, Executive Producer	30 episodes, based on webcomic	
