= List of adult animated television series of the 2000s =

This is a list of adult animated television series of the 2000s (including streaming television series); that is, animated programs targeted towards audiences aged 18 and over in mind. Works in this medium could be considered adult for any number of reasons, which include the incorporation of explicit or suggestive sexual content, graphic violence, profane language, dark humour, or other thematic elements inappropriate for children. Works in this genre may explore philosophical, political, or social issues. Some productions are noted for their complex and/or experimental storytelling and animation techniques. Adult animation is typically defined as animation which skews toward adults. It is also described as something that "formative youths should stay far, far away from" or has adult humor and comes in various styles, but especially sitcoms and comedies. These animations can also "appeal to wide swaths of viewers," including those aged 18–34. AdWeek called adult animation "animated projects aimed at grown-ups, not kids."

In North America, there is children's animation, adult animation, and young adult animation, with various mature animations in the United States, especially in television series. This page mainly includes series in North America and Europe, on programming blocks such as Adult Swim, Animation Domination, Adult Swim (in Canada), and others, with other mature animations, including web series and animated films covered on other pages. These series should not be confused with cartoon pornography.

== List ==
=== United States ===
| Title | Genre | Seasons/episodes | Show creator(s) | Original release | Network | Studio | Age rating | Technique | Source |
|---|---|---|---|---|---|---|---|---|---|
| Queer Duck | Satire | 1 season, 20 episodes | Mike Reiss | 2000 – 2004 | Showtime | Icebox | TV-14 | Flash | |
| Queer Duck | Ribaldry | 1 season, 20 episodes | Mike Reiss | 2000 – 2004 | Showtime | Icebox | TV-14 | Flash | |
| God, the Devil and Bob | Sitcom | 1 season, 13 episodes | Matthew Carlson | March 9, 2000 – March 26, 2011 | NBC | Vanity Logo Productions | TV-14 | Traditional | |
| God, the Devil and Bob | Sitcom | 1 season, 13 episodes | Matthew Carlson | March 9, 2000 – March 26, 2011 | Adult Swim | NBC Studios | TV-14 | Traditional | |
| God, the Devil and Bob | Sitcom | 1 season, 13 episodes | Matthew Carlson | March 9, 2000 – March 26, 2011 | Adult Swim | Carsey-Werner Productions | TV-14 | Traditional | |
| Exposure | Science fiction | 1 season, 13 episodes | | April 5, 2000 – 2002 | NBC | Vanity Logo Productions | | | |
| Clerks: The Animated Series | Sitcom | 1 season, 6 episodes | Kevin Smith | May 31, 2000 – December 14, 2002 | ABC | Miramax Television | TV-MA | Flash | |
| Clerks: The Animated Series | Sitcom | 1 season, 6 episodes | Kevin Smith | May 31, 2000 – December 14, 2002 | ABC | Miramax Television | TV-MA | Traditional | |
| Clerks: The Animated Series | Sitcom | 1 season, 6 episodes | Kevin Smith | May 31, 2000 – December 14, 2002 | Comedy Central | View Askew Productions | TV-MA | Traditional | |
| Clerks: The Animated Series | Sitcom | 1 season, 6 episodes | Kevin Smith | May 31, 2000 – December 14, 2002 | Comedy Central | Touchstone Television | TV-MA | Traditional | |
| Clerks: The Animated Series | Sitcom | 1 season, 6 episodes | Kevin Smith | May 31, 2000 – December 14, 2002 | Comedy Central | Walt Disney Television Animation (uncredited) | TV-MA | Traditional | |
| Spy Groove | Dark comedy | 1 season, 13 episodes | Michael Gans | June 26, 2000 – July 13, 2002 | MTV | MTV Animation | TV-14 | Flash | |
| Spy Groove | Dark comedy | 1 season, 13 episodes | Richard Register | June 26, 2000 – July 13, 2002 | MTV | MTV Animation | TV-14 | Flash | |
| Spy Groove | Dark comedy | 1 season, 13 episodes | Kevin Thomsen | June 26, 2000 – July 13, 2002 | MTV | MTV Animation | TV-14 | Flash | |
| Baby Blues | Sitcom | 2 seasons, 26 episodes (the 2nd 13-episode season never aired) | based on the comic strip created by Jerry Scott and Rick Kirkman | July 28, 2000 – March 10, 2002 | The WB | Split the Difference Productions | TV-PG | Traditional | |
| Baby Blues | Sitcom | 2 seasons, 26 episodes (the 2nd 13-episode season never aired) | based on the comic strip created by Jerry Scott and Rick Kirkman | July 28, 2000 – March 10, 2002 | Adult Swim | King Features Entertainment | TV-PG | Traditional | |
| Baby Blues | Sitcom | 2 seasons, 26 episodes (the 2nd 13-episode season never aired) | based on the comic strip created by Jerry Scott and Rick Kirkman | July 28, 2000 – March 10, 2002 | Adult Swim | Warner Bros. Animation | TV-PG | Traditional | |
| Baby Blues | Sitcom | 2 seasons, 26 episodes (the 2nd 13-episode season never aired) | based on the comic strip created by Jerry Scott and Rick Kirkman | July 28, 2000 – March 10, 2002 | Adult Swim | Warner Bros. Television | TV-PG | Traditional | |
| Sammy | Comedy | 1 season, 2 episodes | David Spade | August 8, 2000 – August 15, 2000 | NBC | Brad Grey Television | TV-PG | Traditional | |
| Sammy | Comedy | 1 season, 2 episodes | Drake Sather | August 8, 2000 – August 15, 2000 | NBC | Desert Rat Productions | TV-PG | Traditional | |
| Sammy | Comedy | 1 season, 2 episodes | Drake Sather | August 8, 2000 – August 15, 2000 | NBC | Adelaide Productions | TV-PG | Traditional | |
| Sammy | Comedy | 1 season, 2 episodes | Drake Sather | August 8, 2000 – August 15, 2000 | NBC | Columbia TriStar Television | TV-PG | Traditional | |
| Playboy's Dark Justice | Softcore pornography | 1 season, 26 episodes | Michael Ninn | September 3, 2000 – 2001 | Playboy TV | Hope Ranch | —N/a | CGI | |
| TV Funhouse | Comedy | 1 season, 8 episodes | • Robert Smigel • Dana Carvey | December 6, 2000 – January 24, 2001 | Comedy Central | —N/a | TV-MA | ? | |
| The Brak Show | Sitcom | 3 seasons, 28 episodes | Jim Fortier | December 21, 2000 – December 31, 2003 | Adult Swim | Wild Hare Studios | TV-PG | Traditional | |
| The Brak Show | Surreal humour | 3 seasons, 28 episodes | Andy Merrill | December 21, 2000 – December 31, 2003 | Adult Swim | Turner Studios | TV-14 (Note: some episodes) | Traditional | |
| The Brak Show | Surreal humour | 3 seasons, 28 episodes | Pete Smith | December 21, 2000 – December 31, 2003 | Adult Swim | Williams Street | TV-14 | Traditional | |
| Sealab 2021 | Science fiction comedy | 4 seasons, 52 episodes | Adam Reed | December 21, 2000 – April 24, 2005 | Adult Swim | Williams Street | TV-14 | Flash | |
| Sealab 2021 | Science fiction comedy | 4 seasons, 52 episodes | Matt Thompson | December 21, 2000 – April 24, 2005 | Adult Swim | TV-PG (Note: some episodes) | 70/30 Productions | Flash | |
| Sealab 2021 | Science fiction comedy | 4 seasons, 52 episodes | Matt Thompson | December 21, 2000 – April 24, 2005 | Adult Swim | TV-PG | Radical Axis | Flash | |
| Sealab 2021 | Science fiction comedy | 4 seasons, 52 episodes | Matt Thompson | December 21, 2000 – April 24, 2005 | Adult Swim | TV-PG | Hanna-Barbera (Note: original footage) | Flash | |
| Aqua Teen Hunger Force | Sitcom | 11 seasons, 139 episodes | Dave Willis | December 30, 2000 – August 30, 2015 | Adult Swim | Williams Street | TV-14 | Flash | |
| Aqua Teen Hunger Force | Surreal humour | 11 seasons, 139 episodes | Matt Maiellaro | December 30, 2000 – August 30, 2015 | Adult Swim | Williams Street | TV-MA (Note: some episodes) | | |
| Aqua Teen Hunger Force | Surreal humour | 11 seasons, 139 episodes | Matt Maiellaro | December 30, 2000 – August 30, 2015 | Adult Swim | Williams Street | TV-PG (Note: Least episodes) | | |
| Harvey Birdman, Attorney at Law | Sitcom | 4 seasons, 39 episodes | Michael Ouweleen | December 30, 2000 –July 22, 2007 | Adult Swim | J. J. Sedelmaier Productions, Inc. (Note: Pilot) | TV-14 | Traditional (Note: season 1) | |
| Harvey Birdman, Attorney at Law | Sitcom | 4 seasons, 39 episodes | Erik Richter | December 30, 2000 –July 22, 2007 | Adult Swim | Allied Art & Science (Note: S01, E02–04) | TV-PG (Note: some episodes) | Flash (Note: season 2-4) | |
| Harvey Birdman, Attorney at Law | Sitcom | 4 seasons, 39 episodes | Erik Richter | December 30, 2000 –July 22, 2007 | Adult Swim | Cartoon Network Studios (Note: S01, E02–09) | TV-PG | Flash | |
| Harvey Birdman, Attorney at Law | Sitcom | 4 seasons, 39 episodes | Erik Richter | December 30, 2000 –July 22, 2007 | Adult Swim | Turner Studios (Note: Season 2–4) | TV-PG | Flash | |
| Harvey Birdman, Attorney at Law | Sitcom | 4 seasons, 39 episodes | Erik Richter | December 30, 2000 –July 22, 2007 | Adult Swim | Williams Street | TV-PG | Flash | |
| Gary & Mike | Sitcom | 1 season, 13 episodes | Fax Bahr | January 12, 2001 – April 13, 2001 | UPN | Bahr-Small Productions | TV-14 | Stop-motion | |
| Gary & Mike | Sitcom | 1 season, 13 episodes | Adam Small | January 12, 2001 – April 13, 2001 | UPN | Will Vinton Studios | TV-14 | Stop-motion | |
| Gary & Mike | Sitcom | 1 season, 13 episodes | Adam Small | January 12, 2001 – April 13, 2001 | UPN | Big Ticket Television | TV-14 | Stop-motion | |
| The Oblongs | Sitcom | 1 season, 13 episodes | Angus Oblong | April 1, 2001 – October 20, 2002 | The WB | Mohawk Productions | TV-14 | Traditional | |
| The Oblongs | Black comedy | 1 season, 13 episodes | Jace Richdale | April 1, 2001 – October 20, 2002 | Adult Swim | Jobsite Productions | TV-PG (Note: some episodes) | Traditional | |
| The Oblongs | Black comedy | 1 season, 13 episodes | Jace Richdale | April 1, 2001 – October 20, 2002 | Adult Swim | Film Roman | TV-PG | Traditional | |
| The Oblongs | Black comedy | 1 season, 13 episodes | Jace Richdale | April 1, 2001 – October 20, 2002 | Adult Swim | Warner Bros. Television | TV-PG | Traditional | |
| Eye Drops | Animation showcase | 1 season, 13 episodes | —N/a | May 16, 2002 – August 8, 2002 | TechTV | Tech TV | —N/a | Traditional | |
| Clone High | Sitcom | 3 seasons, 33 episodes | Phil Lord | November 2, 2002 – February 1, 2024 | MTV | Touchstone Television (Note: season 1) | TV-14 (Note: season 1) | Traditional (Note: season 1) | |
| Clone High | Comedy drama | 3 seasons, 33 episodes | Christopher Miller | November 2, 2002 – February 1, 2024 | Teletoon at Night | Lord Miller Productions | TV-14 | Traditional | |
| Clone High | Satire | 3 seasons, 33 episodes | Christopher Miller | November 2, 2002 – February 1, 2024 | Max (Note: Season 2) | Doozer | TV-14 | Traditional | |
| Clone High | Satire | 3 seasons, 33 episodes | Christopher Miller | November 2, 2002 – February 1, 2024 | Max | Nelvana (Note: season 1) | TV-14 | Traditional | |
| Clone High | Satire | 3 seasons, 33 episodes | Bill Lawrence | November 2, 2002 – February 1, 2024 | Max | MTV Animation (Note: season 1) | TV-14 | Traditional | |
| Clone High | Satire | 3 seasons, 33 episodes | Bill Lawrence | November 2, 2002 – February 1, 2024 | Max | ShadowMachine (Note: Season 2) | TV-MA (Note: Season 2) | Flash (Note: Season 2) | |
| Clone High | Science fiction | 3 seasons, 33 episodes | Bill Lawrence | November 2, 2002 – February 1, 2024 | Max | MTV Entertainment Studios (Note: Season 2) | TV-MA | Flash | |
| 3-South | Comedy | 1 season, 13 episodes | Mark Hentemann | November 7, 2002 – January 21, 2003 | MTV | Warner Bros. Animation | TV-14 | Traditional | |
| 3-South | Comedy | 1 season, 13 episodes | Mark Hentemann | November 7, 2002 – January 21, 2003 | MTV | MTV Animation | TV-14 | Traditional | |
| Hey Monie! | Black sitcom | 3 seasons, 25 episodes | Dorothea Gillim | March 4, 2003 – April 15, 2003 | BET | Soup2Nuts | —N/a | Flash | |
| Hey Monie! | Black sitcom | 3 seasons, 25 episodes | Dorothea Gillim | March 4, 2003 – April 15, 2003 | Oxygen | Soup2Nuts | —N/a | Flash | |
| Hey Joel | Comedy | 1 season, 10 episodes | Joel Stein | June 3, 2003 – June 17, 2003 | VH1 | • Curious Pictures • Six Point Harness | —N/a | Flash | |
| Gary the Rat | Sitcom | 1 season, 13 episodes | Mark Cullen | June 26, 2003 – December 11, 2003 | Spike | Grammnet Productions | TV-14 | Flash | |
| Gary the Rat | Sitcom | 1 season, 13 episodes | Robb Cullen | June 26, 2003 – December 11, 2003 | Spike | Cheyenne Enterprises | TV-14 | Flash | |
| Gary the Rat | Sitcom | 1 season, 13 episodes | Robb Cullen | June 26, 2003 – December 11, 2003 | Spike | Spike Animation Studios | TV-14 | Flash | |
| Stripperella | Superhero | 1 season, 13 episodes | Stan Lee | June 26, 2003 – April 1, 2004 | Spike | The Firm | TV-MA | Traditional | |
| Stripperella | Comedy | 1 season, 13 episodes | Stan Lee | June 26, 2003 – April 1, 2004 | Spike | Network Enterprises | TV-MA | Traditional | |
| Stripperella | Comedy | 1 season, 13 episodes | Stan Lee | June 26, 2003 – April 1, 2004 | Spike | Spike Animation Studios | TV-MA | Traditional | |
| Ren & Stimpy "Adult Party Cartoon" | Comedy | 1 season, 6 episodes | John Kricfalusi | June 26, 2003 – July 24, 2003 | Spike | Spümcø | TV-MA | Traditional | |
| Ren & Stimpy "Adult Party Cartoon" | Comedy | 1 season, 6 episodes | John Kricfalusi | June 26, 2003 – July 24, 2003 | Spike | Spike Animation Studio | TV-MA | Traditional | |
| Ren & Stimpy "Adult Party Cartoon" | Comedy | 1 season, 6 episodes | John Kricfalusi | June 26, 2003 – July 24, 2003 | Spike | Carbunkle Cartoons | TV-MA | Traditional | |
| Ren & Stimpy "Adult Party Cartoon" | Comedy | 1 season, 6 episodes | John Kricfalusi | June 26, 2003 – July 24, 2003 | Spike | Big Star Enterprises | TV-MA | Traditional | |
| Ren & Stimpy "Adult Party Cartoon" | Comedy | 1 season, 6 episodes | John Kricfalusi | June 26, 2003 – July 24, 2003 | Spike | PiP Animation Services | TV-MA | Traditional | |
| Free for All | Sitcom | 1 season, 7 episodes | Brett Merhar | July 11, 2003 – September 12, 2003 | Showtime | Film Roman | TV-MA | Traditional | |
| Spider-Man: The New Animated Series | Superhero | 1 season, 13 episodes | Brian Michael Bendis | July 11, 2003 – September 12, 2003 | MTV | Mainframe Entertainment | TV-PG | CGI | |
| Spider-Man: The New Animated Series | Superhero | 1 season, 13 episodes | Morgan Gendel | July 11, 2003 – September 12, 2003 | MTV | Marvel Entertainment | TV-PG | CGI | |
| Spider-Man: The New Animated Series | Superhero | 1 season, 13 episodes | Marsha Griffin | July 11, 2003 – September 12, 2003 | MTV | Adelaide Productions | TV-PG | CGI | |
| Spider-Man: The New Animated Series | Superhero | 1 season, 13 episodes | Marsha Griffin | July 11, 2003 – September 12, 2003 | MTV | Sony Pictures Television | TV-PG | CGI | |
| VH1 ILL-ustrated | Satire | 2 season, 13 episodes | Bob Cesca | October 17, 2003 – June 25, 2004 | VH1 | Camp Chaos Productions | —N/a | Traditional | |
| VH1 ILL-ustrated | Sketch comedy | 2 season, 13 episodes | Bob Cesca | October 17, 2003 – June 25, 2004 | VH1 | Camp Chaos Productions | —N/a | Traditional | |
| Kid Notorious | Sitcom | 1 season, 9 episodes | Brett Morgen | October 22, 2003 – December 17, 2003 | Comedy Central | Alan & Alan Productions | TV-14 | Traditional | |
| Kid Notorious | Sitcom | 1 season, 9 episodes | Robert Evans | October 22, 2003 – December 17, 2003 | Comedy Central | Six Point Harness | TV-14 | Traditional | |
| Kid Notorious | Sitcom | 1 season, 9 episodes | Alan R. Cohen | October 22, 2003 – December 17, 2003 | Comedy Central | Six Point Harness | TV-14 | Traditional | |
| Kid Notorious | Sitcom | 1 season, 9 episodes | Alan Freedland | October 22, 2003 – December 17, 2003 | Comedy Central | Six Point Harness | TV-14 | Traditional | |
| Decisive Battles | Animated documentary | 1 season, 13 episodes | | 2004 | History Channel | | | | |
| This Just In! | Sitcom | 1 season, 4 episodes | Steve Marmel | March 4 – March 25, 2004 | Spike | Spike Animation Studio | —N/a | Flash | |
| This Just In! | Sitcom | 1 season, 4 episodes | Kevin Kay | March 4 – March 25, 2004 | Spike | Spike Animation Studio | —N/a | Flash | |
| Tripping the Rift | Science fiction | 3 seasons, 39 episodes | Chris Moeller | March 4, 2004 – December 13, 2007 | SyFy | CineGroupe | TV-MA | CGI | |
| Tripping the Rift | Comedy | 3 seasons, 39 episodes | Chuck Austen | March 4, 2004 – December 13, 2007 | Teletoon at Night | Film Roman | TV-MA | CGI | |
| Game Over | Sitcom | 1 season, 6 episodes | David Sacks | March 10, 2004 – April 2, 2004 | UPN | Never Give Up Productions | TV-14 | CGI | |
| Game Over | Sitcom | 1 season, 6 episodes | David Sacks | March 10, 2004 – April 2, 2004 | UPN | Carsey-Werner Productions | TV-14 | CGI | |
| Game Over | Sitcom | 1 season, 6 episodes | David Sacks | March 10, 2004 – April 2, 2004 | UPN | DKP Studios | TV-14 | CGI | |
| Shorties Watchin' Shorties | Comedy | 1 season, 13 episodes | Jim Serpico | April 28, 2004 – December 16, 2004 | Comedy Central | World Famous Pictures | TV-14 | Flash | |
| Shorties Watchin' Shorties | Comedy | 1 season, 13 episodes | Eric Brown | April 28, 2004 – December 16, 2004 | Comedy Central | Augenblick Studios | TV-14 | Flash | |
| Shorties Watchin' Shorties | Comedy | 1 season, 13 episodes | Tom Sellitti | April 28, 2004 – December 16, 2004 | Comedy Central | Augenblick Studios | TV-14 | Flash | |
| Fatherhood | Sitcom | 2 seasons, 26 episodes | Bill Cosby | June 20, 2004 – November 27, 2005 | Nick at Nite | Smiley, Inc. | TV-G | Flash | |
| Fatherhood | Sitcom | 2 seasons, 26 episodes | Charles Kipps | June 20, 2004 – November 27, 2005 | Nick at Nite | Smiley, Inc. | TV-G | Flash | |
| O'Grady | Comedy | 2 seasons, 19 episodes | • Tom Snyder • Carl W. Adams | July 30, 2004 – April 24, 2006 | The N | Soup2Nuts | TV-PG | Flash | |
| Stroker and Hoop | Action | 1 season, 13 episodes | Casper Kelly | August 1, 2004 – December 25, 2005 | Adult Swim | Williams Street | TV-MA | Flash | |
| Stroker and Hoop | Comedy | 1 season, 13 episodes | Jeffrey G. Olsen | August 1, 2004 – December 25, 2005 | Adult Swim | Turner Studios | TV-14 (Note: some episodes) | Flash | |
| Stroker and Hoop | Studio B Productions | | Jeffrey G. Olsen | | | Turner Studios | TV-14 | Flash | |
| The Venture Bros. | Action-Adventure | 7 seasons, 81 episodes | Jackson Publick | August 7, 2004 – October 7, 2018 | Adult Swim | NoodleSoup Productions (Note: 2003–04) | TV-14 | Traditional | |
| The Venture Bros. | Comedy drama | 7 seasons, 81 episodes | Jackson Publick | August 7, 2004 – October 7, 2018 | Adult Swim | World Leaders Entertainment (Note: 2006–10) | TV-MA (Note: some episodes) | Traditional | |
| The Venture Bros. | Comedy drama | 7 seasons, 81 episodes | Jackson Publick | August 7, 2004 – October 7, 2018 | Adult Swim | Titmouse, Inc. (Note: 2011–18) | TV-MA | Traditional | |
| The Venture Bros. | Comedy drama | 7 seasons, 81 episodes | Jackson Publick | August 7, 2004 – October 7, 2018 | Adult Swim | Astro Base GO! | TV-MA | Traditional | |
| The Venture Bros. | Comedy drama | 7 seasons, 81 episodes | Jackson Publick | August 7, 2004 – October 7, 2018 | Adult Swim | Williams Street | TV-MA | Traditional | |
| Father of the Pride | Sitcom | 1 season, 13 episodes | Jeffrey Katzenberg | August 31, 2004 – May 27, 2005 | NBC | DreamWorks Animation | TV-14 | CGI | |
| Video Mods | Music show | 2 seasons, 6 episodes | Tony Shiff | September 16, 2004 – July 22, 2005 | MTV2 | • Big Bear Entertainment • IBC Entertainment | —N/a | CGI | |
| Drawn Together | Sitcom | 3 seasons, 36 episodes | Dave Jeser | October 27, 2004 – November 14, 2007 | Comedy Central | Double Hemm Productions | TV-MA | Traditional | |
| Drawn Together | Satire | 3 seasons, 36 episodes | Matt Silverstein | October 27, 2004 – November 14, 2007 | Comedy Central | Rough Draft Studios | TV-MA | Traditional | |
| Drawn Together | Parody | 3 seasons, 36 episodes | Matt Silverstein | October 27, 2004 – November 14, 2007 | Comedy Central | Rough Draft Studios | TV-MA | Traditional | |
| Perfect Hair Forever | Surreal humour | 3 seasons, 9 episodes | Mike Lazzo | November 7, 2004 – March 31, 2007 | Adult Swim | Williams Street | TV-14 | Flash/Traditional | |
| Perfect Hair Forever | Surreal humour | 3 seasons, 9 episodes | Matt Harrigan | November 7, 2004 – March 31, 2007 | Adult Swim | Radical Axis (Note: episodes 1-7) | TV-MA (Note: one episode) | Flash/Traditional | |
| Perfect Hair Forever | Surreal humour | 3 seasons, 9 episodes | Matt Maiellaro | November 7, 2004 – March 31, 2007 | Adult Swim | Bento Box Animation Studios Atlanta (Note: episode 8 & 9) | TV-MA | Flash/Traditional | |
| Tom Goes to the Mayor | Comedy | 2 seasons, 30 episodes | Tim Heidecker | November 14, 2004 – September 25, 2006 | Adult Swim | Dipshot Films (Note: 2004-2005) | TV-14 | Traditional/Stop-motion | |
| Tom Goes to the Mayor | Comedy | 2 seasons, 30 episodes | Eric Wareheim | November 14, 2004 – September 25, 2006 | Adult Swim | Abso Lutely Productions (Note: 2006) | TV-PG (Note: some episodes) | Traditional/Stop-motion | |
| Tom Goes to the Mayor | Comedy | 2 seasons, 30 episodes | Eric Wareheim | November 14, 2004 – September 25, 2006 | Adult Swim | Williams Street | TV-MA (Note: some episodes) | Traditional/Stop-motion | |
| American Dad! | Animated sitcom | 21 seasons, 388 episodes | Seth MacFarlane | February 6, 2005 – present | Fox (Note: Seasons 1-11) | Fuzzy Door Productions | TV-14 | Traditional (Note: season 1-3) | |
| American Dad! | Animated sitcom | 21 seasons, 388 episodes | Mike Barker | February 6, 2005 – present | TBS (Note: Season 12-onwards) | Underdog Productions | TV-PG (Note: one episode) | | |
| American Dad! | Animated sitcom | 21 seasons, 388 episodes | Matt Weitzman | February 6, 2005 – present | TBS | 20th Television Animation | TV-PG | | |
| American Dad! | Animated sitcom | 21 seasons, 388 episodes | Matt Weitzman | February 6, 2005 – present | TBS | 20th Television | TV-PG | | |
| Robot Chicken | Sketch comedy | 10 seasons, 200 episodes | Seth Green | February 20, 2005 – April 11, 2022 | Adult Swim | ShadowMachine (Note: 2005–12) | TV-MA | Stop-motion | |
| Robot Chicken | Sketch comedy | 10 seasons, 200 episodes | Matthew Senreich | February 20, 2005 – April 11, 2022 | Adult Swim | Stoopid Monkey | TV-14 (Note: some episodes) | Stop-motion | |
| Robot Chicken | Sketch comedy | 10 seasons, 200 episodes | Matthew Senreich | February 20, 2005 – April 11, 2022 | Adult Swim | Stoopid Buddy Stoodios (Note: 2012–present) | TV-14 | Stop-motion | |
| Robot Chicken | Sketch comedy | 10 seasons, 200 episodes | Matthew Senreich | February 20, 2005 – April 11, 2022 | Adult Swim | Sony Pictures Digital (Note: 2005–12) | TV-14 | Stop-motion | |
| Robot Chicken | Sketch comedy | 10 seasons, 200 episodes | Matthew Senreich | February 20, 2005 – April 11, 2022 | Adult Swim | Sony Pictures Television (Note: 2012–present) | TV-14 | Stop-motion | |
| Robot Chicken | Sketch comedy | 10 seasons, 200 episodes | Matthew Senreich | February 20, 2005 – April 11, 2022 | Adult Swim | Williams Street | TV-14 | Stop-motion | |
| Wonder Showzen | Sketch comedy | 2 seasons, 16 episodes | John Lee | March 11, 2005 – May 19, 2006 | MTV2 | Augenblick Studios | TV-MA | Flash/Traditional | |
| Wonder Showzen | Sketch comedy | 2 seasons, 16 episodes | Vernon Chatman | March 11, 2005 – May 19, 2006 | MTV2 | PFFR | TV-MA | Flash/Traditional | |
| 12 oz. Mouse | Psychological thriller | 3 seasons, 31 episodes | Matt Maiellaro | Original series: June 19, 2005 – December 17, 2006 | Adult Swim | Williams Street | TV-14 | Flash | |
| 12 oz. Mouse | Surreal humour | 3 seasons, 31 episodes | Matt Maiellaro | Revival series: July 20, 2020 – July 31, 2020 | Adult Swim | Radical Axis | TV-MA (Note: some episodes) | Flash | |
| Hopeless Pictures | Comedy | 1 season, 9 episodes | Eric Gilliland | August 19, 2005 – October 14, 2005 | IFC | Noodlesoup Productions | —N/a | Flash | |
| Hopeless Pictures | Comedy | 1 season, 9 episodes | Eric Gilliland | August 19, 2005 – October 14, 2005 | IFC | World Leaders Entertainment | —N/a | Flash | |
| Hopeless Pictures | Comedy | 1 season, 9 episodes | Eric Gilliland | August 19, 2005 – October 14, 2005 | IFC | Worlds Away Productions | —N/a | Flash | |
| SuperNews! | Satire | 3 seasons, 67 episodes | Josh Faure-Brac | August 19, 2005 – January 28, 2010 | Current TV | Current TV | TV-14 | Flash | |
| SuperNews! | Political satire | 3 seasons, 67 episodes | Josh Faure-Brac | August 19, 2005 – January 28, 2010 | Current TV | Current TV | TV-14 | Flash | |
| G4's Late Night Peepshow | | 1 season, 34 episodes | | September 1, 2005 – December 25, 2006 | G4 | | TV-MA; TV-14 (some episodes) | | |
| Sunday Pants | Anthology | 1 season, 5 episodes | Craig "Sven" Gordon | October 2, 2005 – October 30, 2005 | Cartoon Network | Spitfire Studios | TV-PG | CGI/Flash/Traditional | |
| Sunday Pants | Anthology | 1 season, 5 episodes | Stuart Hill | October 2, 2005 – October 30, 2005 | Cartoon Network | WeFail | TV-PG | CGI/Flash/Traditional | |
| Squidbillies | Black comedy | 12 seasons, 123 episodes | Jim Fortier | October 16, 2005 – December 13, 2021 | Adult Swim | Williams Street | TV-14 | Flash | |
| Squidbillies | Surreal humour | 12 seasons, 123 episodes | Dave Willis | October 16, 2005 – December 13, 2021 | Adult Swim | Williams Street | TV-MA (Note: some episodes) | Flash | |
| The Boondocks | Black sitcom | 4 seasons, 55 episodes | Aaron McGruder | November 6, 2005 – June 23, 2014 | Adult Swim | Rebel Base Productions | TV-MA | Traditional | |
| The Boondocks | Black sitcom | 4 seasons, 55 episodes | Aaron McGruder | November 6, 2005 – June 23, 2014 | Adult Swim | Adelaide Productions | TV-14 (Note: one episode) | Traditional | |
| The Boondocks | Black sitcom | 4 seasons, 55 episodes | Aaron McGruder | November 6, 2005 – June 23, 2014 | Adult Swim | Sony Pictures Television | TV-14 | Traditional | |
| The Boondocks | Black sitcom | 4 seasons, 55 episodes | Aaron McGruder | November 6, 2005 – June 23, 2014 | Adult Swim | Dong Woo Animation (Note: Season 2) | TV-14 | Traditional | |
| The Boondocks | Black sitcom | 4 seasons, 55 episodes | Aaron McGruder | November 6, 2005 – June 23, 2014 | Adult Swim | MOI Animation (Note: Season 3) | TV-14 | Traditional | |
| The Boondocks | Black sitcom | 4 seasons, 55 episodes | Aaron McGruder | November 6, 2005 – June 23, 2014 | Adult Swim | Studio Mir (Note: Season 4) | TV-14 | Traditional | |
| Moral Orel | Comedy drama | 3 seasons, 44 episodes | Dino Stamatopoulos | December 13, 2005 – December 18, 2008 | Adult Swim | ShadowMachine | TV-MA | Stop-motion | |
| Moral Orel | Comedy drama | 3 seasons, 44 episodes | Dino Stamatopoulos | December 13, 2005 – December 18, 2008 | Adult Swim | Fragical Productions | TV-14 (Note: one episode) | Stop-motion | |
| Moral Orel | Comedy drama | 3 seasons, 44 episodes | Dino Stamatopoulos | December 13, 2005 – December 18, 2008 | Adult Swim | Williams Street | TV-14 | Stop-motion | |
| Minoriteam | Superhero | 1 season, 19 episodes | Adam de la Peña | March 20, 2006 – July 24, 2006 | Adult Swim | Funny Garbage | TV-MA | Flash | |
| Minoriteam | Black comedy | 1 season, 19 episodes | Peter Girardi | March 20, 2006 – July 24, 2006 | Adult Swim | Reas International | TV-MA | Flash | |
| Minoriteam | Black comedy | 1 season, 19 episodes | Todd James | March 20, 2006 – July 24, 2006 | Adult Swim | Monkey Wrangler Productions | TV-MA | Flash | |
| Minoriteam | Black comedy | 1 season, 19 episodes | Todd James | March 20, 2006 – July 24, 2006 | Adult Swim | Williams Street | TV-MA | Flash | |
| The Adventures of Chico and Guapo | Comedy | 1 season, 5 episodes | Paul D'Acri | June 10, 2006 – July 29, 2006 | MTV2 | MTV/Remote Productions | TV-14 | Flash | |
| The Adventures of Chico and Guapo | Comedy | 1 season, 5 episodes | P. J. Pesce | June 10, 2006 – July 29, 2006 | MTV2 | One Red Room | TV-14 | Flash | |
| The Adventures of Chico and Guapo | Comedy | 1 season, 5 episodes | Orlando Jones | June 10, 2006 – July 29, 2006 | MTV2 | One Red Room | TV-14 | Flash | |
| Where My Dogs At? | Comedy | 1 season, 8 episodes | Aaron Matthew Lee | June 10, 2006 – July 29, 2006 | MTV2 | Enough With The Bread Already Productions | TV-PG | Flash | |
| Where My Dogs At? | Comedy | 1 season, 8 episodes | Jeff Ross | June 10, 2006 – July 29, 2006 | MTV2 | MTV Animation | TV-14 (Note: one episode) | Flash | |
| Where My Dogs At? | Comedy | 1 season, 8 episodes | Jeff Ross | June 10, 2006 – July 29, 2006 | MTV2 | Six Point Harness | TV-14 | Flash | |
| Metalocalypse | Black comedy | 4 seasons, 61 episodes | Brendon Small | August 6, 2006 – October 27, 2013 | Adult Swim | Titmouse, Inc. | TV-MA | Flash | |
| Metalocalypse | Black comedy | 4 seasons, 61 episodes | Tommy Blacha | August 6, 2006 – October 27, 2013 | Adult Swim | Williams Street | TV-MA | Flash | |
| Happy Tree Friends | Dark Comedy | 1 season, 13 episodes | Aubrey Ankrum | September 25, 2006 – December 25, 2006 | G4 | Mondo Media | TV-MA | Flash | |
| Happy Tree Friends | Splatter | 1 season, 13 episodes | Rhode Montijo | September 25, 2006 – December 25, 2006 | G4 | Mondo Media | TV-MA (Note: some episodes) | Flash | |
| Happy Tree Friends | Splatter | 1 season, 13 episodes | Kenn Navarro | September 25, 2006 – December 25, 2006 | G4 | Mondo Media | 18+ (Note: Netflix) | Flash | |
| Freak Show | Comedy | 1 season, 7 episodes | • David Cross • H. Jon Benjamin | October 4, 2006 – November 16, 2006 | Comedy Central | Radical Axis | TV-MA | Flash | |
| Frisky Dingo | Action | 2 seasons, 25 episodes | Adam Reed | October 16, 2006 – March 23, 2008 | Adult Swim | 70/30 Productions | TV-MA | Flash | |
| Frisky Dingo | Comedy | 2 seasons, 25 episodes | Matt Thompson | October 16, 2006 – March 23, 2008 | Adult Swim | Williams Street | TV-14 (Note: some episodes) | Flash | |
| Assy McGee | Sitcom | 2 seasons, 20 episodes | Matt Harrigan | November 26, 2006 – July 6, 2008 | Adult Swim | Williams Street | TV-MA | Flash | |
| Assy McGee | Sitcom | 2 seasons, 20 episodes | Carl W. Adams | November 26, 2006 – July 6, 2008 | Adult Swim | Soup2Nuts | TV-MA | Flash | |
| Starveillance | Satire | 1 season, 6 episodes | Eric Fogel | January 5, 2007 – February 9, 2007 | E! | Cuppa Coffee Studios | TV-14 | Stop-motion | |
| The Nutshack | Sitcom | 2 seasons, 16 episodes | Ramon Lopez | April 25, 2007 – May 31, 2011 | Myx TV | ABS-CBN International | TV-MA | Flash | |
| The Nutshack | Sitcom | 2 seasons, 16 episodes | Jesse Hernandez | April 25, 2007 – May 31, 2011 | Myx TV | ABS-CBN International | TV-MA | Flash | |
| Lil' Bush | Satire | 2 seasons, 17 episodes | Donick Cary | June 13, 2007 – May 15, 2008 | Comedy Central | Sugarlab Studios | TV-14 | Flash | |
| Friday: The Animated Series | Comedy | 1 season, 8 episodes | Ice Cube | June 24, 2007 – July 8, 2007 | MTV2 | New Line Television; Cubevision; MTV Animation | TV-14 | Flash | |
| Rick & Steve: The Happiest Gay Couple in All the World | Sitcom | 2 seasons, 14 episodes | Q. Allan Brocka | July 10, 2007 – January 27, 2009 | Logo TV | Cuppa Coffee Studios | TV-MA | Stop-motion | |
| Rick & Steve: The Happiest Gay Couple in All the World | Sitcom | 2 seasons, 14 episodes | Q. Allan Brocka | July 10, 2007 – January 27, 2009 | Teletoon at Night | Cuppa Coffee Studios | TV-MA | Stop-motion | |
| Code Monkeys | Black comedy | 2 seasons, 26 episodes | Adam de la Peña | July 11, 2007 – August 17, 2008 | G4 | Monkey Wrangler Productions | TV-14 | Flash | |
| Slacker Cats | Comedy | 1 season, 6 episodes | Andy Riley | August 13, 2007 – January 23, 2009 | ABC Family | Film Roman | TV-14 | Flash | |
| Slacker Cats | Comedy | 1 season, 6 episodes | Kevin Cecil | August 13, 2007 – January 23, 2009 | ABC Family | Will Vinton Productions | TV-14 | Flash | |
| Slacker Cats | Comedy | 1 season, 6 episodes | Kevin Cecil | August 13, 2007 – January 23, 2009 | ABC Family | Laika | TV-14 | Flash | |
| Lucy, the Daughter of the Devil | Horror | 1 season, 11 episodes | Loren Bouchard | September 9, 2007 – November 11, 2007 | Adult Swim | Fluid Anination | TV-MA | CGI | |
| Lucy, the Daughter of the Devil | Comedy | 1 season, 11 episodes | Loren Bouchard | September 9, 2007 – November 11, 2007 | Adult Swim | Williams Street | TV-MA | CGI | |
| Xavier: Renegade Angel | Dark comedy | 2 seasons, 20 episodes | John Lee | November 4, 2007 – April 16, 2009 | Adult Swim | PFFR | TV-MA | CGI | |
| Xavier: Renegade Angel | Dark fantasy | 2 seasons, 20 episodes | Vernon Chatman | November 4, 2007 – April 16, 2009 | Adult Swim | Cinematico | TV-MA | CGI | |
| Xavier: Renegade Angel | Dark fantasy | 2 seasons, 20 episodes | Vernon Chatman | November 4, 2007 – April 16, 2009 | Adult Swim | Williams Street | TV-MA | CGI | |
| Ceasar and Chuy | Comedy | 1 season, 26 episodes | • Alfonso Amey • Keu Reyes | November 6, 2007 | LATV | • Artistic Warfare • Overman Productions | TV-MA | Flash | |
| Click and Clack's As the Wrench Turns | Sitcom | 1 season, 10 episodes | Howard Grossman | July 9, 2008 – August 13, 2008 | PBS | PBS | TV-G | Flash | |
| Click and Clack's As the Wrench Turns | Sitcom | 1 season, 10 episodes | Doug Berman | July 9, 2008 – August 13, 2008 | PBS | PBS | TV-G | Flash | |
| The Life & Times of Tim | Sitcom | 3 seasons, 30 episodes | Steve Dildarian | September 28, 2008 – February 17, 2012 | HBO | Media Rights Capital | TV-MA | Flash | |
| The Life & Times of Tim | Sitcom | 3 seasons, 30 episodes | Steve Dildarian | September 28, 2008 – February 17, 2012 | HBO | Warner Bros. Television | TV-MA | Flash | |
| Superjail! | Comedy | 4 seasons, 36 episodes | Christy Karacas | September 28, 2008 – July 20, 2014 | Adult Swim | Williams Street | TV-MA | Flash | |
| Superjail! | Comedy | 4 seasons, 36 episodes | Stephen Warbrick | September 28, 2008 – July 20, 2014 | Adult Swim | Augenblick Studios (Note: Season 1) | TV-MA | Flash | |
| Superjail! | Comedy | 4 seasons, 36 episodes | Ben Gruber | September 28, 2008 – July 20, 2014 | Adult Swim | Titmouse, Inc. (Note: Season 2-4) | TV-MA | Flash | |
| The Xtacles | Comedy; Science fiction | 1 season, 2 episodes | Matt Thompson | November 9, 2008 | Adult Swim | 70/30 Productions; Williams Street | TV-MA | Flash | |
| Spaceballs: The Animated Series | Science fiction Parody | 1 season, 13 episodes | Mel Brooks, Thomas Meehan | November 21, 2008 – March 1, 2009 | G4 | Berliner Film Companie; Brooksfilms; Fantasy Prone Interactive; G4 Media; MGM Television | TV-14 | Flash | |
| The Drinky Crow Show | Black comedy | 1 season, 10 episodes | Tony Millionaire; Eric Kaplan | November 23, 2008 – January 25, 2009 | Adult Swim | Mirari Films; Williams Street | TV-MA | CGI | |
| G.I. Joe: Resolute | Superhero | 1 season, 11 episodes | Warren Ellis | April 17–25, 2009 | Adult Swim | Hasbro Studios | TV-14 | | |
| G.I. Joe: Resolute | Superhero | 1 season, 11 episodes | Warren Ellis | April 17–25, 2009 | Adult Swim | Titmouse, Inc. | TV-14 | | |
| Sit Down, Shut Up | Satire | 1 season, 13 episodes | Mitchell Hurwitz | April 19, 2009 – November 21, 2009 | Fox | Tantamount Studios | TV-14 | Traditional | |
| Sit Down, Shut Up | Ribaldry | 1 season, 13 episodes | Mitchell Hurwitz | April 19, 2009 – November 21, 2009 | Fox | ITV Studios | TV-14 | Traditional | |
| Sit Down, Shut Up | Ribaldry | 1 season, 13 episodes | Mitchell Hurwitz | April 19, 2009 – November 21, 2009 | Fox | Adelaide Productions | TV-14 | Traditional | |
| Sit Down, Shut Up | Ribaldry | 1 season, 13 episodes | Mitchell Hurwitz | April 19, 2009 – November 21, 2009 | Fox | 20th Television | TV-14 | Traditional | |
| Sit Down, Shut Up | Ribaldry | 1 season, 13 episodes | Mitchell Hurwitz | April 19, 2009 – November 21, 2009 | Fox | Sony Pictures Television | TV-14 | Traditional | |
| The Goode Family | Comedy | 1 season, 13 episodes | Mike Judge | May 27, 2009 – August 7, 2009 | ABC | Ternion Pictures | TV-PG | Traditional | |
| The Goode Family | Comedy | 1 season, 13 episodes | John Altschuler | May 27, 2009 – August 7, 2009 | ABC | 3 Arts Entertainment | TV-PG | Traditional | |
| The Goode Family | Comedy | 1 season, 13 episodes | Dave Krinsky | May 27, 2009 – August 7, 2009 | ABC | Media Rights Capital | TV-PG | Traditional | |
| DJ & the Fro | Comedy | 1 season, 12 episodes | Dave Jeser | June 15, 2009 – July 2, 2009 | MTV | MTV Animation | TV-14 | Flash | |
| DJ & the Fro | Comedy | 1 season, 12 episodes | Matt Silverstein | June 15, 2009 – July 2, 2009 | MTV | MTV Animation | TV-14 | Flash | |
| Glenn Martin, DDS | Sitcom | 2 seasons, 40 episodes | Michael Eisner | August 17, 2009 – November 7, 2011 | Nick at Nite | Cuppa Coffee Studios | TV-PG | Stop-motion | |
| Glenn Martin, DDS | Sitcom | 2 seasons, 40 episodes | Eric Fogel | August 17, 2009 – November 7, 2011 | Nick at Nite | Tornante Animation | TV-14 (Note: some episodes) | Stop-motion | |
| Glenn Martin, DDS | Sitcom | 2 seasons, 40 episodes | Alex Berger | August 17, 2009 – November 7, 2011 | Nick at Nite | Tornante Animation | TV-14 | Stop-motion | |
| Archer | Sitcom | 10 seasons, 110 episodes | Adam Reed | September 17, 2009 – December 17, 2023 | FX (Note: Seasons 1-7) | Floyd County Productions | TV-MA | Flash | |
| Archer | Action | 10 seasons, 110 episodes | Adam Reed | September 17, 2009 – December 17, 2023 | FXX (Note: Seasons 8-present) | Radical Axis | TV-MA | Flash | |
| Archer | Action | 10 seasons, 110 episodes | Adam Reed | September 17, 2009 – December 17, 2023 | FXX | FX Productions | TV-MA | Flash | |
| The Cleveland Show | Sitcom | 4 seasons, 88 episodes | Seth MacFarlane | September 27, 2009 – May 19, 2013 | Fox | Person Unknown Productions | TV-14 | Traditional | |
| The Cleveland Show | Sitcom | 4 seasons, 88 episodes | Richard Appel | September 27, 2009 – May 19, 2013 | Fox | Happy Jack Productions | TV-14 | Traditional | |
| The Cleveland Show | Sitcom | 4 seasons, 88 episodes | Mike Henry | September 27, 2009 – May 19, 2013 | Fox | Fuzzy Door Productions | TV-14 | Traditional | |
| The Cleveland Show | Sitcom | 4 seasons, 88 episodes | Mike Henry | September 27, 2009 – May 19, 2013 | Fox | Fox Television Animation | TV-14 | Traditional | |
| The Cleveland Show | Sitcom | 4 seasons, 88 episodes | Mike Henry | September 27, 2009 – May 19, 2013 | Fox | 20th Television | TV-14 | Traditional | |
| Titan Maximum | Black comedy | 1 season, 9 episodes | Tom Root | September 27, 2009 – November 22, 2009 | Adult Swim | Williams Street | TV-14 | Stop-motion | |
| Titan Maximum | Parody | 1 season, 9 episodes | Matthew Senreich | September 27, 2009 – November 22, 2009 | Adult Swim | ShadowMachine | TV-MA (Note: one episode) | Stop-motion | |
| Titan Maximum | Parody | 1 season, 9 episodes | Matthew Senreich | September 27, 2009 – November 22, 2009 | Adult Swim | Stoopid Monkey | TV-MA | Stop-motion | |
| Titan Maximum | Parody | 1 season, 9 episodes | Matthew Senreich | September 27, 2009 – November 22, 2009 | Adult Swim | Tom Is Awesome | TV-MA | Stop-motion | |
| Popzilla | Sketch comedy | 1 season, 12 episodes | R.J. Fried | September 27, 2009 – October 16, 2009 | MTV | Animax Entertainment | TV-14 | Flash | |
| Popzilla | Sketch comedy | 1 season, 12 episodes | Tim Hedrick | September 27, 2009 – October 16, 2009 | MTV | MTV Animation | TV-14 | Flash | |
| Popzilla | Sketch comedy | 1 season, 12 episodes | Jared Miller | September 27, 2009 – October 16, 2009 | MTV | MTV Animation | TV-14 | Flash | |
| Popzilla | Sketch comedy | 1 season, 12 episodes | Kevin Pedersen | September 27, 2009 – October 16, 2009 | MTV | MTV Animation | TV-14 | Flash | |
| Popzilla | Sketch comedy | 1 season, 12 episodes | Dave Thomas | September 27, 2009 – October 16, 2009 | MTV | MTV Animation | TV-14 | Flash | |

=== United Kingdom ===
| Title | Genre | Seasons/episodes | Show creator(s) | Original release | Network | Studio | Source |
|---|---|---|---|---|---|---|---|
| House of Rock | Satire | 2 series, 25 episodes | Richard Preddy; Gary Howe | April 5, 2000 – February 6, 2002 | Channel 4 | Fireside Favourites | |
| 2DTV | Satire | 5 seasons, 28 episodes | Giles Pilbrow | October 14, 2001 – December 23, 2004 | ITV | 2DTV Limited | |
| 2DTV | Satire | 5 seasons, 28 episodes | Georgia Pritchett | October 14, 2001 – December 23, 2004 | ITV | 2DTV Limited | |
| Aaagh! It's the Mr. Hell Show! | Comedy | 1 season, 13 episodes | David Freedman | October 28, 2001 – February 18, 2002 | BBC Two | Peafur Productions | |
| Aaagh! It's the Mr. Hell Show! | Comedy | 1 season, 13 episodes | Alan Gilbey | October 28, 2001 – February 18, 2002 | BBC Two | Sextant Productions | |
| The Booo Krooo | Sitcom | 2 seasons, 9 episodes | Matt Mason; Vector Meldrew; Julian Johnson | 2002 – 2004 | Channel U | DAZZLE SHIP | |
| Monkey Dust | Black comedy | 3 seasons, 18 episodes | Harry Thompson | February 9, 2003 – February 8, 2005 | BBC Three | Talkback Thames | |
| Monkey Dust | Black comedy | 3 seasons, 18 episodes | Shaun Pye | February 9, 2003 – February 8, 2005 | BBC Three | Talkback Thames | |
| Empire Square | Comedy | 1 season, 12 episodes | Matt Morgan | 2004 – 2006 | Channel 4 | Coolie | |
| I Am Not an Animal | Black comedy | 1 season, 6 episodes | Peter Baynham | May 10, 2004 – June 14, 2004 | BBC Two | Baby Cow Productions | |
| Popetown | Sitcom | 1 series, 10 episodes | Isabelle Dubernet; Eric Fuhrer; Phil Ox | June 8, 2005 (on C4) | BBC Three | Hong Ying Animation; Armada TMT | |
| Modern Toss | Sketch comedy | 2 seasons, 13 episodes | Jon Link | July 11, 2006 – February 27, 2008 | Channel 4 | Channel X | |
| Modern Toss | Live action/animation hybrid | 2 seasons, 13 episodes | Mick Bunnage | July 11, 2006 – February 27, 2008 | Channel 4 | Modern Toss Productions | |
| Headcases | Satire | 1 season, 8 episodes | Henry Naylor | April 6, 2008 – June 15, 2008 | ITV | UK Visual Effects | |
| Headcases | Satire | 1 season, 8 episodes | Henry Naylor | April 6, 2008 – June 15, 2008 | ITV | Red Vision | |

=== Canada ===
| Title | Genre | Seasons/episodes | Show creator(s) | Original release | Network | Studio | Technique | Source |
|---|---|---|---|---|---|---|---|---|
| Committed | Sitcom | 1 season, 13 episodes | Michael Fry; Mary Feller | March 3, 2001 – June 8, 2001 | CTV | Nelvana; Philippines Animation Studios | Traditional | |
| Undergrads | Sitcom | 1 season, 13 episodes | Pete Williams | April 1, 2001 – August 12, 2001 | Teletoon at Night | MTV Animation | Flash | |
| Undergrads | Sitcom | 1 season, 13 episodes | Pete Williams | April 1, 2001 – August 12, 2001 | MTV | Click Productions | Flash | |
| Undergrads | Sitcom | 1 season, 13 episodes | Pete Williams | April 1, 2001 – August 12, 2001 | MTV | Decode Entertainment | Flash | |
| Undergrads | Sitcom | 1 season, 13 episodes | Pete Williams | April 1, 2001 – August 12, 2001 | MTV | Helix Animation | Flash | |
| Daft Planet | Black comedy | 1 season, 13 episodes | Brent Donnelly | September 2, 2002 – December 23, 2002 | Teletoon at Night | CinéGroupe | Flash | |
| Daft Planet | Black comedy | 1 season, 13 episodes | Derry Smith | September 2, 2002 – December 23, 2002 | Teletoon at Night | CinéGroupe | Flash | |
| Odd Job Jack | Sitcom | 4 seasons, 52 episodes | Adrian Carter | March 5, 2003 – October 14, 2007 | CTV Comedy Channel | Smiley Guy Studios | Flash | |
| Odd Job Jack | Sitcom | 4 seasons, 52 episodes | Denny Silverthorne Jr. | March 5, 2003 – October 14, 2007 | CTV Comedy Channel | Smiley Guy Studios | Flash | |
| Chilly Beach | Comedy | 3 seasons, 65 episodes | Daniel Hawes; Doug Sinclair | September 3, 2003 – 2006 | CBC Television | March Entertainment | Flash | |
| The Wrong Coast | Comedy | 1 season, 13 episodes | Adam Shaheen | December 3, 2003 – June 30, 2004 | The Movie Network | Curious Pictures | Stop-motion | |
| The Wrong Coast | Comedy | 1 season, 13 episodes | Adam Shaheen | December 3, 2003 – June 30, 2004 | The Movie Network | Cuppa Coffee Studios | Stop-motion | |
| The Wrong Coast | Comedy | 1 season, 13 episodes | Adam Shaheen | December 3, 2003 – June 30, 2004 | The Movie Network | Blueprint Entertainment | Stop-motion | |
| Et Dieu créa... Laflaque | Satire | 439 episodes | Serge Chapleau | June 2004 – 2019 | Ici Radio-Canada Télé | Vox Populi inc. | ? | |
| Zeroman | Superhero | 1 season, 13 episodes | Michael Fry; Mary Feller | September 11 – December 5, 2004 | Teletoon | Amberwood Entertainment | Traditional | |
| 6teen | Sitcom; Comedy; Slice-of-life | 4 seasons, 93 episodes | Jennifer Pertsch; Tom McGillis | November 7, 2004 – February 11, 2010 | Teletoon (Canada); Cartoon Network (United States) | Fresh TV; Nelvana | Flash | |
| Acadieman | Superhero | 3 seasons, 16 episodes | Daniel "Dano" Leblanc | 2005 – 2008 | Rogers TV | —N/a | ? | |
| Sons of Butcher | Black comedy Sketch comedy | 2 seasons, 26 episodes | Dave Dunham; Trevor Ziebarth; Jay Ziebarth | August 5, 2005 – January 12, 2007 | Teletoon at Night | S&S Productions | Flash | |
| Station X | – | 1 season, 13 episodes | Didier Loubat | August 12, 2005 – November 20, 2005 | Teletoon at Night | Cité-Amérique | Traditional | |
| What It's Like Being Alone | Black comedy | 1 season, 13 episodes | Brad Peyton | June 26, 2006 – September 18, 2006 | CBC Television | —N/a | Stop-motion | |
| Weird Years | Sitcom | 1 season, 26 episodes | Jason Hopley | November 6, 2006 – June 11, 2007 | YTV | Lenz Entertainment | Flash | |
| Weird Years | Sitcom | 1 season, 26 episodes | Jamie Shannon | November 6, 2006 – June 11, 2007 | YTV | Mercury Filmworks | Flash | |
| Total Drama | Animated sitcom | 6 seasons, 119 episodes | Jennifer Pertsch | July 8, 2007 – November 20, 2014 | Teletoon (Canada) | Fresh TV | Flash | |
| Total Drama | Satire | 6 seasons, 119 episodes | Tom McGillis | July 8, 2007 – November 20, 2014 | Cartoon Network (United States) | Fresh TV | Flash | |
| Total Drama | Parody | 6 seasons, 119 episodes | Tom McGillis | July 8, 2007 – November 20, 2014 | Cartoon Network (United States) | Fresh TV | Flash | |
| Punch! | Comedy; Parody | 1 season, 20 episodes | —N/a | January 11, 2008 – 2008 | Teletoon at Night | —N/a | Traditional | |
| Life's a Zoo | Sitcom | 2 seasons, 20 episodes | Adam Shaheen | September 1, 2008 – November 8, 2009 | Teletoon at Night | Cuppa Coffee Studios | Stop-motion | |
| Life's a Zoo | Sitcom | 2 seasons, 20 episodes | Andrew Horne | September 1, 2008 – November 8, 2009 | Teletoon at Night | Cuppa Coffee Studios | Stop-motion | |
| By the Rapids | Comedy | 4 seasons, 27 episodes | Joseph Lazare | November 20, 2008 – October 20, 2012 | APTN | Big Soul Productions | ? | |
| Bob & Doug | Sitcom | 2 seasons, 15 episodes | Dave Thomas | April 19, 2009 – June 9, 2011 | Global | Animax Entertainment | Flash | |
| Bob & Doug | Sitcom | 2 seasons, 15 episodes | Rick Moranis | April 19, 2009 – June 9, 2011 | Global | Animax Entertainment | Flash | |
| Stoked | Sitcom; Comedy | 2 seasons, 52 episodes | Jennifer Pertsch; Tom McGillis | June 25, 2009 – January 26, 2013 | Teletoon (Canada); Cartoon Network (United States, season 1 only) | Fresh TV | Flash | |

=== Latin America and Brazil ===
| Title | Country | Genre | Seasons/episodes | Show creator(s) | Original release | Network | Studio | Source |
|---|---|---|---|---|---|---|---|---|
| Megaliga MTV de VJs Paladinos | Brazil | Comedy, Sitcom | 3 seasons, 56 episodes | Marco Pavão | October 7, 2003 – August 3, 2007 | MTV Brasil | Estricnina Desenhos Animados | |
| Fudêncio e Seus Amigos | Brazil | Comedy, Sitcom | 6 seasons, 179 episodes | Thiago Martins | August 23, 2005 – August 25, 2011 | MTV Brasil (Note: Seasons 1-2) | Estricnina Desenhos Animados | |
| Fudêncio e Seus Amigos | Brazil | Black comedy | 6 seasons, 179 episodes | Marco Pavão | August 23, 2005 – August 25, 2011 | Comedy Central Latin America (Note: Seasons 3-6) | Estricnina Desenhos Animados | |
| Fudêncio e Seus Amigos | Brazil | Black comedy | 6 seasons, 179 episodes | Flávia Boggio | August 23, 2005 – August 25, 2011 | Comedy Central Latin America | Estricnina Desenhos Animados | |
| Alejo & Valentina | Argentina | Sitcom | 4 seasons, 53 episodes | Alejandro Szykula | October 26, 2006 – February 20, 2010 | MTV Latin America | LoCoARTS | |
| Alejo & Valentina | Argentina | Surreal humour | 4 seasons, 53 episodes | Alejandro Szykula | October 26, 2006 – February 20, 2010 | MTV Latin America | LoCoARTS | |
| City Hunters | Argentina | Drama | 1 season, 9 episodes | Gastón Gorali; Alberto Stagnaro | October 23, 2006 – December 18, 2006 | Fox Channel | Fox Factory; Axe Attractions | |
| Rockstar Ghost | Brazil | Comedy, Sitcom | 1 season, 9 episodes | Marco Pavão | September 4, 2007 – September 20, 2007 | MTV Brasil | Estricnina Desenhos Animados | |
| Rockstar Ghost | Brazil | Mystery | 1 season, 9 episodes | Marco Pavão | September 4, 2007 – September 20, 2007 | MTV Brasil | Estricnina Desenhos Animados | |
| The Jorges | Brazil | Comedy, Sitcom | 2 seasons, 9 episodes | Marco Pavão | September 4, 2007 – September 17, 2008 | MTV Brasil | Estricnina Desenhos Animados | |
| The Jorges | Brazil | Musical | 2 seasons, 9 episodes | Thiago Martins | September 4, 2007 – September 17, 2008 | MTV Brasil | Estricnina Desenhos Animados | |
| Nada que Ver | Venezuela; Argentina | Sketch Comedy; Black Comedy | 1 Season, 12 Episodes | Juan Andrés Ravell; Oswaldo Graziani | June 12, 2007 - June 26, 2007; August 14, 2007 | Sony Entertainment Television Latin America | Plop TV; Encuadre | |

=== Spain ===
| Title | Genre | Seasons/episodes | Show creator(s) | Original release | Network | Studio | Source |
|---|---|---|---|---|---|---|---|
| Arròs covat | Drama | 3 seasons, 36 episodes | Juanjo Sáez | September 29, 2009 – December 15, 2012 | El 33 | Cinema and Audiovisual School of Catalonia | |
| Arròs covat | Drama | 3 seasons, 36 episodes | Juanjo Sáez | September 29, 2009 – December 15, 2012 | El 33 | Televisió de Catalunya | |

=== France ===
| Title | Genre | Seasons/episodes | Show creator(s) | Original release | Network | Studio | Source |
|---|---|---|---|---|---|---|---|
| Mr. Baby | Slapstick | 1 season, 48 episodes | Marc du Pontavice | May 3, 2009 – August 10, 2010 | France 3 | Xilam | |
| Mr. Baby | Black comedy | 1 season, 48 episodes | Carol-Ann Willering | May 3, 2009 – August 10, 2010 | France 3 | Xilam | |

=== New Zealand ===
| Title | Genre | Seasons/episodes | Show creator(s) | Original release | Network | Studio | Source |
|---|---|---|---|---|---|---|---|
| bro'Town | Sitcom | 5 seasons, 32 episodes | Elizabeth Mitchell | September 22, 2004 – May 24, 2009 | Three | Firehorse Films | |
| bro'Town | Sitcom | 5 seasons, 32 episodes | Elizabeth Mitchell | September 22, 2004 – May 24, 2009 | Three | Naked Samoans | |
| bro'Town | Sitcom | 5 seasons, 32 episodes | Elizabeth Mitchell | September 22, 2004 – May 24, 2009 | Three | NZ on Air | |
| bro'Town | Sitcom | 5 seasons, 32 episodes | Elizabeth Mitchell | September 22, 2004 – May 24, 2009 | Three | DQ Entertainment | |
| bro'Town | Sitcom | 5 seasons, 32 episodes | Elizabeth Mitchell | September 22, 2004 – May 24, 2009 | Three | Toon City Animation | |

=== Poland ===
| Title | Genre | Seasons/episodes | Show creator(s) | Original release | Network | Studio | Source |
|---|---|---|---|---|---|---|---|
| Włatcy móch | Comedy | 9 seasons, 127 episodes | Bartosz Kędzierski | November 14, 2006 – December 4, 2011 | TV4 | RMG | |

=== Georgia ===
| Title | Genre | Seasons/episodes | Show creator(s) | Original release | Network | Studio | Source |
|---|---|---|---|---|---|---|---|
| The Samsonadzes | Sitcom | 1 season, 18 episodes | Shalva Ramishvili | November 2009 – June 2010 | Imedi TV | —N/a | |

=== Israel ===
| Title | Genre | Seasons/episodes | Show creator(s) | Original release | Network | Studio | Source |
|---|---|---|---|---|---|---|---|
| M.K. 22 | Sitcom | 1 season, 10 episodes | Yaron Niski; Doron Tzur; Assaf Harel; Ohad Elimelech (Character design) | 21 March 2004 – 2004 | Bip | Shortcut Design Post Production | |

=== Sweden ===
| Title | Genre | Seasons/episodes | Show creator(s) | Original release | Network | Studio | Source |
|---|---|---|---|---|---|---|---|
| Da Möb | Adult animation | 1 season, 14 episodes | Magnus Carlsson | 3 November 2001 – 9 March 2002 | ABC Family/SpikeTV (USA); Sveriges Television (Sweden) | Happy Life Animation; Wavery Entertainment B.V. Millimages | |

=== Co-productions ===
| Title | Country | Genre | Seasons/episodes | Show creator(s) | Original release | Network | Studio | Technique | Source | |
|---|---|---|---|---|---|---|---|---|---|---|
| John Callahan's Quads! | Canada | Comedy | 1 season, 26 episodes | John Callahan | February 2, 2001 – October 19, 2002 | Teletoon at Night | SBS independent | Flash | | |
| John Callahan's Quads! | Australia | Comedy | 1 season, 26 episodes | John Callahan | February 2, 2001 – October 19, 2002 | SBS | Animation Works | Flash | | |
| John Callahan's Quads! | Australia | Comedy | 1 season, 26 episodes | John Callahan | February 2, 2001 – October 19, 2002 | SBS | Media World Features | Flash | | |
| John Callahan's Quads! | Australia | Comedy | 1 season, 26 episodes | John Callahan | February 2, 2001 – October 19, 2002 | SBS | Film Victoria | Flash | | |
| John Callahan's Quads! | Australia | Comedy | 1 season, 26 episodes | John Callahan | February 2, 2001 – October 19, 2002 | SBS | ScreenWest | Flash | | |
| John Callahan's Quads! | Australia | Comedy | 1 season, 26 episodes | John Callahan | February 2, 2001 – October 19, 2002 | SBS | Nelvana | Flash | | |
| Delta State | Australia | France | Science fiction | 1 season, 26 episodes | Brent Donnelly | SBS | September 11, 2004 – February 27, 2005 | France 2 | Nelvana | Flash |
| Delta State | Canada | Derry Smith | Science fiction | 1 season, 26 episodes | Canal+ | Deltanim Productions | September 11, 2004 – February 27, 2005 | | | Flash |
| Delta State | Canada | Derry Smith | Science fiction | 1 season, 26 episodes | Teletoon at Night | Gaumont Animation | September 11, 2004 – February 27, 2005 | | | Flash |
| Bromwell High | United Kingdom | Comedy | 1 season, 13 episodes | Anil Gupta | February 1, 2005 – April 26, 2005 | Channel 4 | Hat Trick Productions | Flash | | |
| Bromwell High | Canada | Comedy | 1 season, 13 episodes | Richard Osman | February 1, 2005 – April 26, 2005 | Teletoon at Night | Decode Entertainment | Flash | | |
| Bromwell High | Canada | Comedy | 1 season, 13 episodes | Richard Pinto | February 1, 2005 – April 26, 2005 | Teletoon at Night | Decode Entertainment | Flash | | |
| Producing Parker | Canada | Sitcom | 2 seasons, 26 episodes | Kevin Gillis | May 4, 2009 – July 8, 2011 | Global | Breakthrough Entertainment | Flash | | |
| Producing Parker | Philippines | Sitcom | 2 seasons, 26 episodes | Kevin Gillis | May 4, 2009 – July 8, 2011 | TVtropolis | Breakthrough Entertainment | Flash | | |

=== Pilots ===
| Title | Genre | Show creator(s) | Original release | Network | Studio | Source |
|---|---|---|---|---|---|---|
| Welcome to Eltingville | Comedy | Evan Dorkin | March 3, 2002 | Adult Swim | Cartoon Network Studios | |
| Saddle Rash | Western | Loren Bouchard | March 24, 2002 | Adult Swim | Flickerlab | |
| Saddle Rash | Comedy | Loren Bouchard | March 24, 2002 | Adult Swim | Ka-Plunk Productions | |
| Saddle Rash | Comedy | Loren Bouchard | March 24, 2002 | Adult Swim | Loren Bouchard Productions | |
| The Groovenians | Comedy | Kenny Scharf | November 10, 2002 | Adult Swim | Cartoon Network Studios | |
| Korgoth of Barbaria | Action | Aaron Springer | June 3, 2006 | Adult Swim | Cartoon Network Studios | |
| Korgoth of Barbaria | Action | Aaron Springer | June 3, 2006 | Adult Swim | Williams Street | |
| Neon Knome | Surreal comedy | Ben Jones | 2008 | Adult Swim | Cartoon Network Studios | |
| Neon Knome | Surreal comedy | Ben Jones | 2008 | Adult Swim | Williams Street | |
| Neon Knome | Surreal comedy | Ben Jones | 2008 | Adult Swim | Mirari Films | |
| Snake 'n' Bacon | Comedy | Michael Kupperman | May 10, 2009 | Adult Swim | Fayettenam Records Corp. | |
| Snake 'n' Bacon | Comedy | Michael Kupperman | May 10, 2009 | Adult Swim | Williams Street | |

=== Unaired ===
| Title | Genre | Seasons/episodes | Show creator(s) | Original release | Network | Studio | Source |
|---|---|---|---|---|---|---|---|
| Immigrants (Note: Made into a direct-to-video film in 2008) | Comedy | 1 season, 6 episodes | Gábor Csupó | August 12, 2004 | Spike | Klasky Csupo | |

== See also ==
- List of adult animated television series
  - List of adult animated television series of the 2010s
  - List of adult animated television series of the 2020s
- LGBT representation in adult animation
- Modern animation in the United States
- Lists of animated feature films
- Independent animation
- Animation in the United States in the television era
- Cartoon violence
