= Joseph Lazare =

Mohawk filmmaker (1984–2025)

Joseph Tekaroniake Lazare
- Born: June 19, 1984
- Died: January 18, 2025 (aged 40)

Joseph Tekaroniake Lazare (June 19, 1984 – January 18, 2025) was a Mohawk director, producer, writer and actor. He was a member of the Wolf Clan.

== Early life ==
Lazare grew up in Kahnawake, a Mohawk reserve south of the Saint Lawrence River and across from Montreal, Quebec, Canada. He began filmmaking at 12 years old through Teioiaks, a local summertime film production program. After attending Kahnawake’s local high school, Lazare left a collegiate film and television production program to intern at Aboriginal owned and operated Big Soul Productions in Toronto, Ontario.

== Career ==
Lazare’s films To the Rescue and Mervin were each selected to screen at the Toronto International Teen Movie Festival (now The YoungCuts Film Festival). After gaining attention from Bird Runningwater (Mescalero Apachi/Cheyenne), Associate Director of Native American and Indigenous Programs for the Sundance Institute, Lazare's Might of the Star Chaser premiered at the 2004 Sundance Film Festival. Might of the Star Chaser is a multi-platform animation that tells the story of a young space officer trying to save his planet from being destroyed by an evil lizard bent on repopulating its species. The same year, Lazare participated in CyberPowWow, an interactive visual art exhibition web-hosted by Oboro Gallery in Montreal. In 2007, along with Big Soul Productions, Lazare produced By the Rapids, a Mohawk-language children's animated series. The show was picked up by APTN and ran for 4 seasons, making it the first prime time Aboriginal animated series. By the Rapids is the story of Cory Littlehorn, a pampered urban teen, and his parents as they adjust to life with their extended family members and eccentric neighbours in a quirky Mohawk community.

He died on January 18, 2025.

== Filmography ==
Title	Year	Role
Bat Kidd	1999	Director, writer, actor
To the Rescue	2000	Director, writer, actor
Mervin	2001	Director, writer, actor
Might of the Star Chaser	2002	Director, writer, actor
Good Looking	2004	Director, writer
By the Rapids (4 seasons)	2006-2010	Creator, director, writer, producer, actor
DYS	2014	Actor
Mohawk Girls	2014–present	Actor
