= Maude Michaud =

Canadian filmmaker and actress (born 1983)

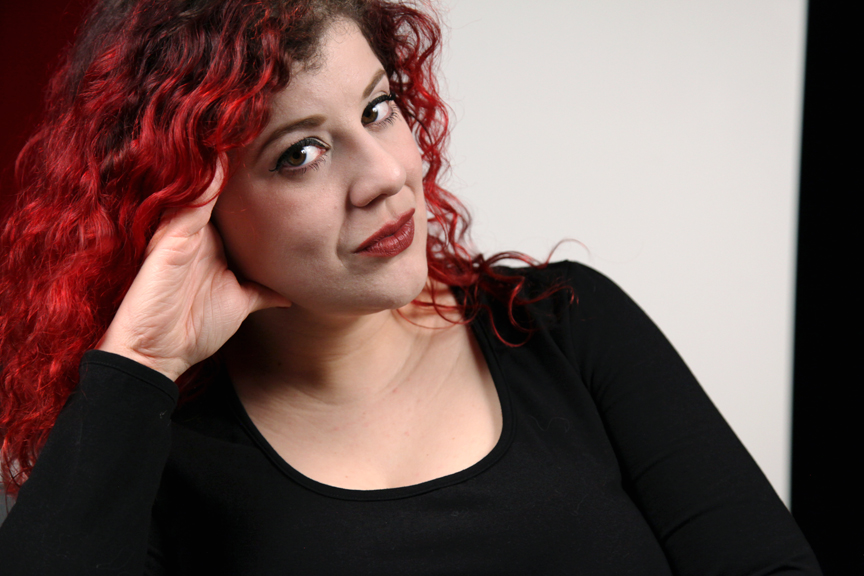
- Born: December 23, 1983 (age 42)
- Education: Concordia University
- Occupations: Actress; filmmaker; screenwriter
- Known for: Dys-

Maude Michaud (born December 23, 1983) is a Canadian screenwriter, filmmaker and actress. She is best known for her first feature-length film Dys- (2014), which she wrote, directed, produced and edited.

== Early life ==
Maude Michaud is from Greenfield Park, Quebec. She began drama lessons when she was nine years old. By the age of sixteen, she made her first short film, Finding Hope, which was chosen for the official selection in Toronto's International Teen Movie Festival. By seventeen, her second short film, Spirits, which was her first work in the horror genre, was also screened at this festival.

== Education ==
Michaud did all of her post-collegiate studies at Montreal's Concordia University, where she obtained her bachelor's degree in communication studies and film production with a minor in project management. She has since graduated with a master's degree in media studies.

Her master's thesis titled "Horror Grrrls: Resistance and Agency within the Interpretive Community of Women Horror Filmmakers" focuses primarily on women in the horror genre. It consisted of a written element as well as a documentary web series titled Bloody Breasts, which examined women's role in the horror film industry and tackled certain prepossessed notions about women's relation to this genre.

== Career ==
By day, Michaud works for an organization which creates media content. Her position within the organization requires her to accommodate various events and projects. In 2001, Michaud founded her own Montreal-based film production company, Quirk Films. Through her production company, she has released various audio-visual works as well as some films, including her first feature-length film, Dys-.

=== Dys- ===
In 2014 Dys-, premiered at Montreal's International Fantasia Film Festival. The film chronicles a couple who quarantine themselves inside their condo when the news of a viral outbreak surfaces. The two main characters, whose marriage is in shambles, must face the mysterious pandemic while the proximity to one another only serves to pull them apart even further. Together, Eva and Sam are forced to confront their innermost demons.

== Filmography ==
Film	Year	Type	Credits
Complex Model	2006	Short	Director, writer, producer
Recessed	2007	Short	Director, writer, producer, editor, art director
Complex Model	2007	Short	Director, writer, producer, editor, cinematographer, actress
The Portrait	2008	Short	Director, writer, producer
Frankenstein Unlimited ("Reflection" segment)	2009	Short	Director, writer, producer, editor, actress
Reflection	2009	Short	Director, writer, co-producer
Hollywood Skin	2010	Short	Director, writer, producer, editor
Snuff	2010	Short	Director, writer, producer, editor, cinematographer
Bloody Breasts	2011	Web Series	Director, producer, editor, cinematographer
Red	2011	Short	Director, writer, producer, editor
T is for Toothpick	2011	Short	Director, writer, producer
World of Death	2014	Short	Director
Dys-	2014	Feature	Director, writer, producer, editor
