= Michael Fry =

Michael Fry may refer to:

- Michael Fry (cartoonist), American cartoonist, online media entrepreneur, and screenwriter
- Michael Fry (comedian), Irish comedian, actor and musician
- Mike L. Fry, American serial entrepreneur, entertainer, trainer and marketing expert
