= By the Rapids =

Canadian animated television show

By the Rapids is Mohawk-language animated television show that originally aired on the Aboriginal Peoples Television Network (APTN) from 2008 to 2012. Along with the stop-motion series Wapos Bay, it was among the first Indigenous animated television series in Canada.

The series centers on Cory Littlehorn, a teenager whose family moves from the urban setting of Toronto to the small Native community where his parents grew up and the humor of day-to-day life in a small town. It was created by Joseph Lazare who drew from his experience of moving when he was a teenager from Kahnawake, a Mohawk reserve outside of Montreal, to Toronto. Lazare has stated that it was his intent to create a show that "was special to our community but wasn't neglecting people from the outside." Additionally, he wanted to show that his culture was filled with a variety of types of people with different lifestyles.

== Characters ==
Joseph Lazare:

- Cory
- Regis, Cory's uncle
- Kim
- Ado Darho

Kaniehtiio Horn:

- Karen, Cory's cousin
- Oneida

Others:

- Waneek Horn Miller
- A1T2

Mighty 5 Nations (M5N):

- Mohawk, guy who curls a dumbbell. His totem is Eagle.
- Oneida, girl with brown hair, 3 feathers, no purple shawl, heels
- Onondaga, guy
- Seneca, girl with black hair, 1 feather, glasses, purple headband, shoots arrows. She initiates Super Mighty Warrior.
- Kayuga, guy
- Tuscarora the uncounted towel boy with glasses, Sene is afraid he will be hurt. His totem is Rock which he can become as the SMW head. Becomes dispatcher after secretly helping.

Injusticers:

- Ado Darho
- Father Fauhder
- Bucky, the most evil buck tooth beaver. He gets enlarged.
- Queen Vexin, commands army of robot bees. She gets shrunk.
- Firewater Man

== Episodes ==
"Mighty 5 Nations in: Invasion of Turtle Island" in TV guides is actually listed onscreen as "BY THE RAPIDS PRESENTS THE MIGHTY 5 NATIONS IN INVASION AT TURTLE ISLAND".

=== Season 1 ===
| No. overall | No. in season | Title | Directed by | Written by | Original release date |
|---|---|---|---|---|---|
| 1 | 1 | "Here We Are" | Joseph Lazare | Joseph Lazare | 2008 |
Cory is pulled away from his big-city life and forced to move to his parents' hometown.
| 2 | 2 | "Can You Feel the Spirit" | Joseph Lazare | Joseph Lazare | 2008 |
n/a
| 3 | 3 | "Grip the Stick" | Joseph Lazare | Joseph Lazare | 2008 |
n/a
| 4 | 4 | "Indian Princesses Are Lame" | Joseph Lazare | Joseph Lazare | 2008 |
Cory helps Karen look her best for a beauty pageant.
| 5 | 5 | "Tent in His Shorts" | Joseph Lazare | Joseph Lazare | 2008 |
Cory is forced to go camping.
| 6 | 6 | "Cigs" | Joseph Lazare | Joseph Lazare | 2008 |
Cory and Karen decide to take jobs at a local smoke shop.
| 7 | 7 | "Yes, No, Maybe So" | Joseph Lazare | Joseph Lazare | 2008 |
A bully orders Cory out of town!

=== Season 3 ===
APTN hosts this.
