= Alejo & Valentina =

Argentine flash animated sitcom

- Genre: Animated sitcom
- Created by: Alejandro Szykula
- Directed by: Alejandro Szykula; Adrian Peralta
- Voices of: Alejandro Szykula; Nelson Galatto Salomon
- Music by: Leo Blumberg; Andres Cáceres(Audio mix)
- Opening theme: Tema Oficial de Alejo y Valentina
- Country of origin: Argentina
- Original language: Spanish
- No. of seasons: 4

Production
- Producers: Pablo Zimmerman; Alejo Zylberman; Mauro Leggieri; Josh Greenburg; Jacqueline Cantore; German Groba
- Animators: Alejandro Szykula; Damian Jara; Julian Castro; Camilo Rodriguez Salomon; Alejandro Pereyra; Alberto Fanigliulo; Marcos de Cousandier; Facundo Hidalgo; Adrian Peralta; Diego Murgia
- Editors: Alejandro Szgkula; Martin Urquijo
- Production companies: LoCo ARTS; Producciones Caimán co.

Original release
- Network: MTV Latin America
- Release: 2002 – 2022

Alejo & Valentina is an Argentine flash animated sitcom by Alejandro Szykula of LoCoARTS, created in 2002, aimed at teens. The show ran for 52 episodes on MTV Latin America. The animation style is very simplistic and the storylines are filled with nonsense humor, running gags and a absurdist comedy tone.

== Characters ==
The characters as shown from left to right: El Viejo, Alejo, Valentina and Carlitox. Above Carlitox is El pajarito

=== Main ===
==== Alejo ====
Alejo is a 22-year-old man married to Valentina. His favorite football team is River Plate. He is based on Alejandro Szykula, the series' creator.

Alejo always wears a purple shirt and black pants. He has white skin and short black hair. He is patient and inexpressive, always speaking with the same tone and facial expressions. He thinks that he and Valentina have to have sex with their clothes on, unless they are in the bath. When he grows up he wants to be a Playmobil.

Sometimes, he becomes aggressive and violent. This happens in the episodes Volver al futurox (Back to the Futurex), Locura extraordinaria (Extraordinary Madness) - where he transforms into a beast resembling The Incredible Hulk- and Volver al futurox EXTENDED (Back to the Futurex EXTENDED). Sometimes, this happens when he eats ketchup. He also is capable of vast reality warping powers, being able to alter or reverse past events to create bizarre and surreal situations. He is very skilled with lightsaber swordfighting, during his trip to a Parallel Universe he met his alter-ego. This version possessed high-level telekinesis.

According to a story El Viejo told in Episode 1, La vida misma (Life as it is, or Life Itself), a stork which was going to deliver the baby Alejo was struck by lightning, causing him to fall into a river and over a waterfall. He ended up on a beach where he met Valentina, also a baby at the time. It is never revealed if this story is true or not as in Episode 15 Darth Baston (Darth Cane) and the TV episode Darth Baston EXTENDED (Darth Cane EXTENDED), El Viejo claims that he is Alejo's father. (parodying the scene where Darth Vader tells Luke Skywalker he is his father).

Catch Phrases

- ¿Y si vamos a comer comida? (How about we go to eat food?)
- La quiero con mayonesa, sin ketchup y con mostaza. (I want it with mayonnaise, no ketchup and with mustard.)
- ¿Y cómo hay que hacer? (And how is it done?)
- ¡Que vengan todos los putos, loco! (Literally: Let all 'em fags come at me, man! Although a more accurate translation would be: "bring it on, motherfuckers!")
- ¿Vos Sos Dios? (Are you God?)
- Mira la Vieja. (Look the Crone.)
- ¿Te haces el malo, gil? (Playing tough, punk?)
- ¡Recatate, gil, ¿eh?! (Wise up punk, huh?!)
- ¡Che, Valentinaaaa! (Hey Valentina!)
- Me parece una propuesta diferente y buenísima. (I think it's a different and awesome proposal.)
- Me pica el culo. (My ass itches.)

==== Valentina ====
Valentina is a 22-year-old woman married to Alejo. She is 1.75 meters tall (5'9''). Her favorite football team is Boca Juniors. Valentina is based on Alejandro Szykula's ex-girlfriend.

She has white skin, long dark hair, and an inexpressive demeanor, speaking in the same tone no matter the situation. She is incredibly strong, skilled in martial arts, and proficient with the katana. She would like to be a dancer when she is older.

According to a story El Viejo told in Episode 1, La vida misma (Life as it is, or Life Itself), a stork which was meant to deliver the baby Valentina was abducted by aliens, leaving Valentina to fall out of the sky and into a rubbish lorry in Papapipa. As the lorry crosses a bridge, a helicopter crashes, destroying both the lorry and the bridge. Valentina falls into a sewer and is carried to the beach where she meets the baby Alejo. It is never revealed if this story is true or not as in Episode 15 Darth Baston (Darth Cane) and the TV episode Darth Baston EXTENDED (Darth Cane EXTENDED), El Viejo claims that he is Alejo's father.

Catch Phrases

- Yo quiero un sánguche. (I want a sandwich.)
- Hay que tener sexo. (We gotta have sex.)
- Me tocaron el culo. (Somebody touched my ass.)
- ¡Alejo!

==== Carlitox ====
Carlitox is a short 19-year-old with messy green hair. His favorite football team is Rosario Central. He's about 1.55 meters (5'2") tall. He has the ability to float magically. This is later explained in a parody with the Clown from the movie "It" (based on the book by Stephen King) who tells him "Everybody floats...". During the trip to the Parallel Universe, he discovers his alter-ego, a tall, serious, muscular man with red hair, who is capable of high-level pyrokinesis and producing energy blasts.

He stores several things in his garage, including a UFO, which he later exchanged for a X-Wing ship from Star Wars, martial arts weapons, costumes, a time-travelling DeLorean, a machine that allows his to revisit previous episodes, a helicopter, a battery-compass, as well as numerous objects he has never used (see his catchphrases, below). Due to the lack of space he parks his car outside a TV studio garage.

He always wears a blue tank top and black trousers. Usually, he enters people's houses without permission and introduces himself by saying "Hola, vengo a flotar" (Hello, I've come to float). Carlitox is impatient and hyperactive, and most of the time he is up to something. Whenever he has something new and interesting, he likes to show it off.

Carlitox's father supposedly fought in the Malvinas War with El Viejo, and died when he saved El Viejo's life. Carlitox lives with his mother and has a blue-haired twin brother.

Catch Phrases

- Houla, vengo a flotar. (Heullo, I've come to float.)
- Houla, vengo a (...). (Heullo, I've come to (...) )
- Houla, vengo a revolear las patas. (Heullo, I've come to swing my legs around.)
- Houla, vengo a romper las bolas (Heullo, I've come to annoy.)
- Bueno, chau. (Well, bye.)
- Mirá, mirá, tengo (...), mirá. (Look, look, I've got (...), look.)
- ¡Jo-joo-jo! (Carlitox's trademark laughter.)
- Ehm, me parece una muy buena idea, pero... (Ehm, I think it's a very good idea, but...)
- ¿Qué hacemos? (What are we going to do?)
- Tengo un (...) en el garaje, nunca lo use. (I have a (...) in my garage, never used it.)
- Pisé una banana y me fui a la mierda, y después apareció un payaso y me dijo... no me acuerdo lo que me dijo. (I stepped on a banana and got messed up, then a clown appeared and told me... I do not remember what I said.)

==== El Viejo ====
The charismatic Viejo, often called El Viejo del Bastón (The Old Man With the Cane), is an old man who spends a lot of time with Alejo, Valentina and Carlitox. His favorite football team is Chacarita Juniors.

El Viejo wears a grey robe. He often appears spontaneously, and acts wise even though he is not smart and his advice is useless. He is known for his Paraguayan accent, ending almost every sentence with 'viteh' (y'see), a word derived from 'viste' (you see). He seems to have a crush on an older lady named La Vieja, and often impersonates Hattori Hanzō or Pai Mei from Kill Bill. He also claims to know Victor Sueiro personally.

He is able to teleport. He is skilled in magic. He is in great physical condition, and is as muscular as a bodybuilder.

Catch Phrases

- ...,viteh. (...,y'see.)
- Hola, viteh. (Hi, y'see.)
- Tengo chaleco, viteh. (I've got (bulletproof) vest, y'see.)
- Pero, ¡¿vos sos loco, viteh?! (But, are you crazy, y'see?!)
- Lo que hagas puede tener repercusiones en eventos futuros, viteh. (Anything you do may affect future events, y'see.)
- Vamo' a matar a los bichos, viteh. (We're gonna kill all them bugs, y'see)

==== Gregory ====
He is 20 years old and wears a blue shirt and darker pants. He is a friend of most of the characters in the series, and is the fall-guy of many pranks from the other characters. He speaks with the Argentinian "Cheto" accent (posh or snobby accent). His power is superhuman speed. He owns a bar and is very shy around women. He likes Pop music and often sings in the episodes. He's a fan of River Plate. His role has increased as the series has progressed as he and Matias became more important in the show; he appeared in every episode of the second season as a main character. He is Matias' best friend, despite Matias' often condescending attitude towards Gregory because of his superficial nature.

Catch Phrases

- Uuuy, que divertido. (Ohhh, how fun.)
- Me tocaron el culo. (Someone touched my ass.)
- Uuuy, bueno ya, dale. (Ohhh, OK, let's do it.)
- Che, pónganle algo de onda. (Hey, be a little more cool.)
- ¡Paren las rotativas! ¡Paren las rotativas! (Stop the presses! Stop the presses!)

==== Matias ====
He is the sarcastic and cynical main prankster of the series and often accompanies Gregory. He once dated Gregory's sister, much to his companion's annoyance. He has an anger management problem and often starts shooting indiscriminately with his Uzi submachine gun when angry and uses very rude language towards everyone, always ending his phrases with "boludo" (dumbass). The word "boludo" is also used a term of endearment in Argentina when speaking with close friends. Before the series, Matías tried to cast in several films but could not participate in the production of many because of its obscene language, such as Inspector Gadget which originally had a part for him. He wears a red shirt and blue trousers.

Catch Phrases

- Me chupa la pija vo' y (...) boludo! (You and (...) can suck my dick you dumbass!)
- Boludo! (dumbass!)
- ¿Entendé' como e', boludo? (You got that, dumbass?)

=== Recurring ===
- Ricardo: A guy in a gray shirt and blue pants. 1.80 m. He is a caricature of Argentine singer Ricardo Montaner. He wears a mask to hide his face, his skin is pale yellow in color, has red eyes and has curlers in his head. He often acts as the main antagonist of the series (although in some episodes acts as a minor character) and people are not loyal to deal with him. It has a mouse named El Ratón that always tricks him and he has a laugh very similar to Muttley's laugh. He works for an unseen villain (sometidos rumored to be Dr. Claw from Inspector Gadget).
- El Ratón: A mouse who never stays true to dealings with Ricardo, which calls first and instead of making the agreement runs away with Ricardo's money. Seems to be hyperactive or nervous. His dress is white and muscular, wears blue shorts, and brown shoes.
- The Wilkinson Twins (Charles & Mike): Two American twins, both porn actors. They both speak resembling Latin American-dubbed Spanish.
- El Negro: A stereotypical tramp, representing Argentina's low classes. He has eight brothers, all from different fathers. He is always begging for pennies for the bus, despite the fact that he owns a Ferrari Testarossa.
- Carlos el pibe del noticiero: A reporter who appears in most episodes, reporting tragedies or strange occurrences such as alien invasions and massacres in a calm and uncaring way as if they were everyday occurrences.
- El Chino del restaurante: a man with a Chinese accent who works in a Chinese food restaurant. He is constantly annoyed by Alejo's random phone calls to place ambiguous orders.
- El Pato Bonavides The owner of the "Super TV channel". He appears offering the main characters parts in his TV shows, often giving them contracts to sign. He constantly tries to scam whomever he hires to work on his TV shows.
- El Pelado: Or El Pelado Del Samba and El Pelado De La Calesita, varies according to his job. He is a bald man with bad luck. Whenever he operates a ride at Parque Park, something knocks him out or injures him, causing the ride he operates to go out of control and kill the people riding it and people nearby. Those accidents clearly make a reference to the ones that happened in the former Italpark of Buenos Aires, that forced that classic park of the 1990s to stop operating due to the death of one girl after something apparently failed in the "Matterhorn".
- El pajarito: Is a blue talking bird who appears in the opening of all the episodes. He lives with his wife Negra and his sons and daughter Palito, Bombon and Helado in the tree in front of Alejo's house.
- El Gobernator: Actually Arnold Schwarzenegger. In the show he is portrayed in his role as The Terminator, but he is at the same time the governor of the Provincia de Buenos Aires. He is often charged with protecting a member of the gang from different threats, such as Aliens and Robert Patrick. In every episode he is featured, a skeptical, innocent bystander asks what he is doing in Argentina if he is the governor of California; Schwarzenegger will immediately reply by shooting them and telling them to shut up.

=== Minor and guests ===
- Cara de Cocou: a metafictional character that often appears in "Cara de Cocou & Pirín", a show-within-a-show.
- Pirín: Cara de Cocou's friend in "Cara de Cocou & Pirín".
- Urna: Cara de Cocou's girlfriend in "Cara de Cocou & Pirín".
- Cacho: A friend of Alejo and Valentina. He is an impatient salesman. He never seems to lose his cool ("How many zombies can there be...one, two, three zombies...we kill them all, man").
- Satan: He is portrayed as a stereotypical nerd, but when angry he will generate a huge cloud of smoke around himself and turn into a huge red demon. Gregory accidentally kills him in the Halloween episode when he and Matias are sent to hell.
- El Paraguayo Alternatonto: Appears in the episode "Expreso a Pilar" and in the episode "Behind the Flash" saying "¡Qué drogadicto que sos!" (You're such a junkie!)" .
- Kabronero: a parody of one of Alejandro Szykula's friends.
- Dumloco: a parody of one of the creator's friends.
- Doctor Socolinski: Alejo and Valentina's doctor, based on a TV celebrity by the same name.
- Peronemlins (also Menemlins and Alfonsinemlins): They are Gremlins with famous Argentine politicians heads: Juan Domingo Perón, Carlos Menem and Raúl Alfonsín.
- Panchita: A girl with blue hair who acts as a recurring love interest to Gregory.
- El Reverendo Hijo De Puta: A reverend whose name is a pun on the Argentine insult "reverendo hijo de puta" (roughly translated to "freaking son of a bitch" in English). He lives in the church near Alejo's house and constantly asks God to do him favors that he'll "pay back to him...some day...OK, never".
- Rafutín: A creature that appears in several episodes as an extra but never has had a major role.
- Sebastián: Appears in the episode Recatate Soldado Brian.
- Andrés: Appears in the episode Recatate Soldado Brian as Sebastián's lost brother.
- Rogelio: A friend of el Negro, his catchphrase is saying the word "re-cajetilla" ("extra cool") for example: "re-cajetilla este (...) loco!"

== Episodes ==
=== Online ===
There are currently 22 online episodes, divided into three seasons, plus the episodes that are being aired on TV.

==== Season 1 (2002–03) ====
- 1-01 - Life Itself
- 1-02 - Mc King
- 1-03 - Alien Invasion
- 1-04 - Horror Special
- 1-05 - The Party
- 1-06 - The Matris
- 1-07 - Office 77
- 1-08 - Back to the futurex
- 1-09 - Extraordinary Madness
- 1-10 - Dinning with Carlitox

==== Season 2 (2004–05) ====
- 2-11 - La vieja y la piedra (The Crone and the Stone)
- 2-12 - Kill Rick (a parody of Kill Bill, part 2 of La vieja y la piedra)
- 2-13 - La Pesadilla de Carlitox (Carlitox' Nightmare mocking "Nightmare on Elm Street")
- 2-14 - La Isla de lo' mono' (The Island o' Monkey, mocking the Monkey Island series. "Mono" is Spanish for "Monkey").
- 2-15 - Behind The True Celebrities Stories Uncensored Flash (a pun on E! True Hollywood Story and Celebrities Uncensored, episode about the truth behind the show and the lives behind the characters)
- 2-16 - Darth Baston (Darth Cane, mocking Episodes IV, V and VI of the Star Wars saga)
- 2-17 - Fundación Guillermo Francella (Guillermo Francella Foundation, a special episode about AIDS)

==== Season 3 (2012–17) ====
- 3-18 - Alejo y Valentina Regresan de la Luna (Alejo and Valentina come back from the Moon)
- 3-19 - Que es esa luz?! (What is that light ?!, part 2 of Alejo y Valentina Regresan de la luna)
- 3-20 - La Edad del Corazón (Parte 1) (The Age of the Heart (Part 1))
- 3-21 - La Edad del Corazón (Parte 2) (The Age of the Heart (Part 2))
- 3-22 - El Mago con Dientes (The Wizard with Teeth)

=== Television series ===
==== Season 1 (2006–07) ====
- 1 - "Alejo y Valentina contra los muertos vivos" ("Alejo and Valentina Vs. the Undead")
- 2 - "Volver al futurox EXTENDED" ("Back to the Futurex EXTENDED")
- 3 - "Kill Rick EXTENDED"
- 4 - "Expreso a Pilar" ("Pilar Express"- mocking The Polar Express)
- 5 - "The Matris EXTENDED"
- 6 - "Termineitor D.O.S" (a parody of the film Terminator and the famous operating system, also "dos" means two in Spanish)
- 7 - "Salgamos afuera" ("Let's go outside")
- 8 - "Recatate soldado Brian" (a parody of the film Saving Private Ryan)
- 9 - "El día de Colorín" ("Colorin's Day")
- 10 - "Liberen a Carlitox" ("Free Carlitox")
- 11 - "Darth Baston EXTENDED" ("Darth Cane EXTENDED")
- 12 - "El día que Alejo conoció a Maradona" ("The Day Alejo Met Maradona")
- 13 - "El Cumple del Viejo" ("The Old Man's Birthday")

==== Season 2 (2007–08) ====
- 14 - "El bar de Gregory" ("Gregory's café")
- 15 - "La carrera loca" ("The crazy race" - mocking Wacky Races)
- 16 - "Volver al Futurox contra los indios" ("Back to the Futurex vs. the Indians")
- 17 - "Parquepark"
- 18 - "El día que las vacas no vuelan más" ("The day the cows don't fly anymore")
- 19 - "El X-Orxixta viteh" ("The X-Orxixt y' see")
- 20 - "Alejo vs. Mario Baracus" ("Alejo vs. B. A. Baracus")
- 21 - "El regreso del cometa Halley" ("The return of Halley's Comet")
- 22 - "Las redes nueivas" ("The new fishnets" - a parody of the film "Nine Queens")
- 23 - "Un día re-torcido" ("A Crazy Day")
- 24 - "Pinocho" ("Pinocchio" - a parody of Walt Disney Pictures' film "Pinocchio")
- 25 - "Raíces" ("Roots")
- 26 - "Viaje al fondo de las casas" ("Trip to the bottom of the houses")

==== Season 3 (2008–09) ====
- 27 - "Dr. Viejaux" ("Dr. Oddhoux")
- 28 - "Colorin Colorado"
- 29 - "Un safari re cajetilla" ("A Really Cool Safari")
- 30 - "Alejo y Valentina contra Los Dinosaurios" ("Alejo and Valentina VS. the Dinosaurs")
- 31 - "La Maldición del Topo Chicho" ("The Curse of Topo Chicho")
- 32 - "Cantalindo" ("Singnice")
- 33 - "Ladry Potter y El Prisionero de Batán" ("Ladry Potter and the Prisoner of Batán" - a parody of "Harry Potter and the Prisoner of Azkaban")
- 34 - "¿Que saltás, loco?" ("Why are you jumping, nut case?")
- 35 - "Locademia de SuperHeroes" ("Crazyademy of SuperHeroes")
- 36 - "Jo Jo Jo Feliz Navidad" ("Ho Ho Ho Merry Christmas")
- 37 - "Titanix"
- 38 - "Es top model viteh" ("It's top model y'see")
- 39 - "La Fabrica de CuchoMate" ("The Factory of CuchoMate")

==== Season 4 (2009–10) ====
- 40 - "Ghrek" (a parody of the "Shrek" film series)
- 41 - "La verdad de la Milanga" ("The truth of the Milanese")
- 42 - "El Efecto Mariposón" ("The Mariposón Effect")
- 43 - "Eso e' todo verso" ("That's all bull")
- 44 - "Alejo presidente del Mundo" ("Alejo, President of the World")
- 45 - "$3,00" (a parody of the film 300)
- 46 - "Hay que tener Sexo" ("Keep Sex")
- 47 - "Mission Ma-Jodida" ("Ma-Fuckin Mission" - a parody of the Spy-themed films)
- 48 - "Pesadillas Cajetillas" ("Really Cool Nightmares")
- 49 - "Carlitox Big Brother" (parody of "Big Brother")
- 50 - "Floggerfield" (the title is a parody of the film "Cloverfield", the episode itself is a parody of [•REC])
- 51 - "Garron Ball Z" (a parody of "Dragon Ball Z")
- 52 - "V de tu Vieja" ("V for Yo Mama" - a parody of the film "V for Vendetta")
- 53 - "Recuerdos con Punch" ("Memories with Punch")

==== Season 5 (2020) ====
- 54 - Alguien es el octavo pasajero (Somebody is the Eight Passenger)
- 55 - La maldición del Italpark (The Italpark's Curse)
- 56 - Los Recontravengers (The HyperMegavengers)
- 57 - Alejo y Valentina contra los Tomates Perita (Alejo & Valentina vs. the Cherry Tomatoes)
- 58 - Valenticia en el País Recajetilla (Valentice in the Extra-Cool Country)
- 59 - IT, el Yosapa Comepibes (I.T. The Kid-Eating Clown)
- 60 - El Bar de Gregory 2 (Gregory's Cafe 2)
- 61 - Breaking Viteh
- 62 - Breaking Viteh 2
- 63 - Greg-Man
- 64 - La Historia con Fin (The Story with an Ending)
- 65 - Cuestión de Obeso (A Matter of Fat People)
- 66 - Alejo y Valentina contra los Illuminati (Alejo & Valentina vs. the Illuminati)
- 67 - Alejo y Valentina contra los Illuminati 2 (Alejo & Valentina vs. the Illuminati 2)

==== Season 6 (2022) ====
- 68 - Jojoker
- 69 - Vamos pal Bailongo (Let's go Dancing)
- 70 - Cuentos de la Crota (Tales of the Old Lady)
- 71 - Cuentos de la Crota 2 (Tales of the Old Lady 2)
- 72 - Vitehlyus
- 73 - Entremos Adentro (Let's get Inside)
- 74 - Gilboy
- 75 - Mingo y Anibal (Mingo & Anibal)
- 76 - Karate Gil
- 77 - La casa de Papanoel (The House of Papanoel)
- 78 - Behind the Flash 3 (Part 1)
- 79 - Behind the Flash 3 (Part 2)

==== Season 7 (2026) ====
- 80 - Cositas Raras (Weird Little Things)

==== Especiales ====
- Especial Pennywise de Alejo y Valentina IT El Payaso Plim Plim y V de Tu Vieja
- Masters of the Universe: Alejo y Valentina Edición Especial 2026
- Especial Viernes 13: "La Maldicion Del Ital Park" Alejo y Valentina (1080p)
