= The YoungCuts Film Festival =

Film festival

- Location: Toronto (2001–2006); Montreal (2007–2015); Vancouver (2016–present)
- Established: 2001
- Hosted by: The YoungCuts Film Festival Group
- No. of films: 100
- Website: http://www.youngcuts.com/

The YoungCuts Film Festival is an international film festival based in Vancouver, British Columbia, Canada, whose mandate is to advance the careers of young filmmakers. Originally established in Toronto in 2001, the festival was created to identify and help talented young people begin their film and television careers by providing exposure and recognition of their works. In 2007, the festival moved to Montreal. The annual event selects the best 100 films of the year from more than 1,000 submissions by filmmakers 29 years old and under. In 2016, the festival moved from Montreal to Vancouver.

== History ==
Originally launched in Toronto as the Toronto International Teen Movie Festival in 2001, the event was re-organized and re-launched as the YoungCuts Film Festival in 2005. In August 2006, the festival added Montreal as a venue and became bilingual, featuring 50 films including English and French titles. The festival began to receive more submissions from around the world, eventually reaching over 1,000.

In 2007, the festival made Montreal its new official home. The festival also set a goal to increase the quantity and quality of films submitted to the festival. As a result, the festival expanded from four days to eight and the number of films presented expanded from 50 to 100. The festival has grown significantly since its inception, and has been actively supported by a number of television and film professionals including Tom Sizemore, Lalaine, Chris Potter, Maxim Roy, and Frédérick De Grandpré.

The festival has received the support of a number of major companies. Its sponsors have included Pepsi, Nokia, Astral Media, High Fidelity HDTV, Avid Technology, Quebecor, Tribute Magazine, and the City of Montreal. Louise Kierans is president of the festival and Harvard MBA graduate Jay Moulton has been chairman of the festival since 2005.

In 2009, more than one thousand films from twenty countries were submitted to the festival. In 2010, entries were received from 30 countries. In 2011, more than 1,200 films were evaluated leading up to the festival's 10th anniversary celebration in September 2011. In 2012, the festival expanded to include filmmakers ages 25 to 29. In late 2016, the festival moved to its new home in Vancouver.
